= 2023 Birmingham Legion FC season =

Birmingham Legion FC
2023 season
- President and general manager: Jay Heaps
- Head coach: Tom Soehn
- Stadium: Protective Stadium
- USL Championship: 7th
- Playoffs: Conference Semifinals
- U.S. Open Cup: Quarter-finals
- Top goalscorer: Enzo Martínez (11 goals)
colors	Away colors	Third colors

The 2023 Birmingham Legion season was the fifth season of play in the club's history in the USL Championship.

== Squad information ==
=== Roster ===
As of March 9, 2023

No.	Pos.	Nation	Player
1	GK	USA	Matt Van Oekel
2	DF	USA	Ben Reveno (on loan from New England Revolution)
3	DF	COD	Phanuel Kavita
4	DF	USA	Collin Smith (on loan from FC Dallas)
5	MF	USA	Mikey Lopez
6	MF	GHA	Anderson Asiedu
7	FW	NGR	Diba Nwegbo
9	FW	USA	Juan Agudelo
10	FW	GHA	Prosper Kasim
11	FW	JAM	Neco Brett
13	MF	USA	Jake Rufe
15	FW	CAN	Tyler Pasher
16	DF	BRA	Gabriel Alves
17	MF	USA	Matthew Corcoran
18	GK	USA	Trevor Spangenberg
19	MF	URU	Enzo Martínez
21	DF	USA	Alex Crognale
23	MF	USA	Grayson Dupont
30	GK	USA	Seth Torman
33	DF	GHA	Moses Mensah

1. USL Academy contract

== Competitions ==
=== Preseason ===
18 February 2023	Charlotte FC	3–2	Birmingham Legion FC	Charlotte, North Carolina
	Jóźwiak 11'; Świderski 26'; Copetti 34'	Report		Stadium: Bank of America Stadium

=== USL Championship ===
==== Eastern Conference ====
Pos	Team	Pld	W	L	T	GF	GA	GD	Pts	Qualification
5	Louisville City FC	34	14	12	8	41	44	−3	50	Playoffs
6	Indy Eleven	34	13	11	10	46	38	+8	49	Playoffs
7	Birmingham Legion FC	34	14	16	4	44	53	−9	46	Playoffs
8	Detroit City FC	34	11	15	8	30	39	−9	41	Playoffs
9	Miami FC	34	11	15	8	43	44	−1	41	

Source: USL Championship Standings
Rules for classification: 1) head-to-head points; 2) head-to-head goal differential; 3) points-per game within conference; 4) total wins; 5) total goal differential; 6) total goals scored; 7) points earned against top four Conference finishers; 8) disciplinary points; 9) coin toss or drawing of lots

==== Regular season ====
All times in Eastern Time Zone.

11 March 2023 1	Birmingham Legion	1–1	Pittsburgh Riverhounds SC	Birmingham, Alabama
6:30 p.m.	Crognale (yellow card) 6', (goal) 28'; Asiedu (yellow card) 23'	Report	Forbes (yellow card) 41'; Mertz 72'	Stadium: Protective Stadium; Attendance: 6,722; Referee: Sergii Demianchuk

17 March 2023 2	Birmingham Legion	3–2	FC Tulsa	Birmingham, Alabama
7:00 p.m.	Pasher 4', 83'; Gabriel Alves (yellow card) 51'; Crognale (yellow card) 65'; Asiedu (yellow card) 75'; Brett 90+2'	Report	da Costa 49'; Corrales (yellow card) 45+1'; Epps 54'; Fernandez (yellow card) 82'	Stadium: Protective Stadium; Attendance: 4,077; Referee: Elvis Osmanovic

25 March 2023 3	Hartford Athletic	0–1	Birmingham Legion	Hartford, Connecticut
1:00 p.m.	Kibato (yellow card) 42'; Merrill (yellow card) 70'; Logue (yellow card) 90+2'	Report	Gabriel Alves 24'; Agudelo (yellow card) 45+5'	Stadium: Trinity Health Stadium; Attendance: 3,106; Referee: DeShun Beard

1 April 2023 4	Tampa Bay Rowdies	0–2	Birmingham Legion	St. Petersburg, Florida
6:30 p.m.	Lasso (yellow card) 59'; Guillen (yellow card) 90+1'; Dennis (yellow card) 90+5'	Report	Brett 45+5', 83'; Smith (yellow card) 50'; Kavita (yellow card) 76'; Agudelo (yellow card) 78'; Gabriel Alves (yellow card) 89'	Stadium: Al Lang Stadium; Attendance: 6,397; Referee: Thomas Snyder

9 April 2023 5	Birmingham Legion	1–2	Phoenix Rising FC	Birmingham, Alabama
4:30 p.m.	Agudelo (yellow card) 56'; Gabriel Alves 59'; Martínez (yellow card) 59'	Report	Lambert (yellow card) 34'; Cuello (yellow card) 39'; Krutzen (yellow card) 45+2'; Arteaga (yellow card) 56'; Trejo 58', (yellow card) 90'; Harvey 66', (yellow card) 87'; Zambrano (yellow card) 67'; Njie (yellow card) 77'; Fuenmayor (yellow card) 89'	Stadium: Protective Stadium; Attendance: 4,750; Referee: John Griggs

15 April 2023 6	Loudoun United FC	3–0	Birmingham Legion	Leesburg, Virginia
5:00 p.m.	Leggett 32'; ElMedkhar 42'; Houssou (yellow card) 50'; Ryan 69', (yellow card) 90+4'	Report	Rufe (yellow card) 54'	Stadium: Segra Field; Attendance: 2,505; Referee: Luis Arroyo

22 April 2023 7	Orange County SC	1–2	Birmingham Legion	Irvine, California
9:00 p.m.	Nielsen 30'; Scott (yellow card) 55'; Partida (yellow card) 57'	Report	Agudelo 33'; Kavita (yellow card) 40'; Crognale (yellow card) 53'; Martínez 59', (yellow card) 64'	Stadium: Championship Soccer Stadium; Attendance: 4,114; Referee: Elvis Osmanovic

30 April 2023 8	Birmingham Legion	3–2	Hartford Athletic	Birmingham, Alabama
4:00 p.m.	Asiedu (yellow card) 45'; Martínez (yellow card) 64', (goal) 65', 76'; Crognale 90+3'	Report	Cedeno 38', (yellow card) 60'; Lewis (yellow card) 45+4'; Edwards 67'; Sánchez (yellow card) 89'	Stadium: Protective Stadium; Attendance: 4,813; Referee: Greg Dopka

3 May 2023 9	Miami FC	3–1	Birmingham Legion	Miami
6:00 p.m.	Sorto 2', (yellow card) 56'; Crognale 16' (o.g.); Repetto (yellow card) 49'; Dowouna 71'	Report	Corcoran (yellow card) 34'; Martínez 36'; Asiedu (yellow card) 81'; Gabriel Alves (yellow card) 90+4'	Stadium: Riccardo Silva Stadium; Attendance: 1,070; Referee: Sergii Demianchuk

6 May 2023 10	Birmingham Legion	1–4	Oakland Roots SC	Birmingham, Alabama
6:30 p.m.	Lopez (yellow card) 6'; Kavita (yellow card) 35' (yellow-red card); Martínez 48', (yellow card) 82'; Gabriel Alves (yellow card) 62'; Van Oekel (yellow card) 77'	Report	Formella 45+3' (pen.); Wright (yellow card) 47'; Mfeka 64', (yellow card) 67'; Reid 71'; Rito (yellow card) 83'; Diaz (yellow card) 87'; Rodriguez 88'	Stadium: Protective Stadium; Attendance: 4,186; Referee: Sergii Boiko

13 May 2023 11	Pittsburgh Riverhounds SC	2–1	Birmingham Legion	Pittsburgh
6:00 p.m.	Dikwa 11', 70'; Dossantos (yellow card) 53'	Report	Corcoran 35', (yellow card) 64'; Mensah (yellow card) 69'; Gabriel Alves (yellow card) 83'; Reveno (yellow card) 90+3'	Stadium: Highmark Stadium; Attendance: 5,123; Referee: Adam Kilpatrick

20 May 2023 12	Birmingham Legion	1–2	El Paso Locomotive FC	Birmingham, Alabama
6:30 p.m.	Agudelo 17'; Asiedu (yellow card) 55'	Report	Solignac 19'; Rose 58'	Stadium: Protective Stadium; Attendance: 4,636; Referee: Matthew Thompson

27 May 2023 13	Detroit City FC	1–0	Birmingham Legion	Hamtramck, Michigan
3:00 p.m.	Rodriguez 29'; Williams (yellow card) 68'; Matthews (yellow card) 82'; Amoo-Mensah (yellow card) 90+3'	Report	Mensah (yellow card) 28'; Lopez (yellow card) 35'; Smith (yellow card) 44'; Dupont (yellow card) 90'	Stadium: Keyworth Stadium; Attendance: 6,164; Referee: Melvin Rivas

17 June 2023 14	Birmingham Legion	2–1	Indy Eleven	Birmingham, Alabama
6:30 p.m.	Gabriel Alves (yellow card) 21'; Nwegbo 55'; Crognale (yellow card) 62'; Asiedu (yellow card) 64'; Martínez 89'	Report	Boudadi (yellow card) 8'; Vázquez (yellow card) 24'; Guenzatti 56'	Stadium: Protective Stadium; Attendance: 5,453; Referee: Olvin Oliva

21 June 2023 15	Birmingham Legion	2–0	Loudoun United FC	Birmingham, Alabama
7:00 p.m.	Nwegbo 34'; Agudelo (yellow card) 58'; Gabriel Alves (yellow card) 75'; Brett 83'	Report		Stadium: Protective Stadium; Attendance: 4,572; Referee: Lorenzo Hernandez

1 July 2023 16	San Antonio FC	3–1	Birmingham Legion	San Antonio
8:00 p.m.	Hernandez 10'; Azócar (yellow card) 29'; Oluwaseyi 62'; Bailone (yellow card) 86'; Dhillon 90+1'	Report	Gabriel Alves (yellow card) 53'; Crognale (yellow card) 66'; Martínez (yellow card) 70'; Pasher 81'; Asiedu (yellow card) 89'	Stadium: Toyota Field; Attendance: 8,266; Referee: Natalie Simon

8 July 2023 17	Las Vegas Lights FC	3–3	Birmingham Legion	Las Vegas
9:30 p.m.	Preston 60'; Carleton 67'; Botello Faz 90+3'	Report	Agudelo 31'; Pasher 45'; Martínez 81'; Kavita (yellow card) 90+5'	Stadium: Cashman Field; Attendance: 1,856; Referee: Brad Jensen

15 July 2023 18	Birmingham Legion	1–0	Tampa Bay Rowdies	Birmingham, Alabama
6:30 p.m.	Martínez 49', (yellow card) 83'; Asiedu (yellow card) 53'; Smith (yellow card) 83'	Report	Guillén (yellow card) 89'	Stadium: Protective Stadium; Attendance: 6,034; Referee: Brandon Stevis

22 July 2023 19	Louisville City FC	1–2	Birmingham Legion	Louisville, Kentucky
7:00 p.m.	Mares 34', (yellow card) 70'; McCabe (yellow card) 58'; Ownby (yellow card) 67'	Report	Smith (yellow card) 14'; Crognale (yellow card) 19', (goal) 90+2'; Agudelo 55'; Rufe (yellow card) 77'	Stadium: Lynn Family Stadium; Attendance: 9,584; Referee: Abdou Ndiaye

29 July 2023 20	Birmingham Legion	1–2	Charleston Battery	Birmingham, Alabama
6:30 p.m.	Crognale (yellow card) 25'; Gabriel Alves (yellow card) 38'; Kasim 43'; Mensah (yellow card) 68'	Report	Markanich (yellow card) 18'; Palma (yellow card) 48'; Trager 82'; Dodson 90+1'	Stadium: Protective Stadium; Attendance: 5,212; Referee: Matt Thompson

4 August 2023 21	Colorado Springs Switchbacks FC	2–1	Birmingham Legion	Colorado Springs, Colorado
8:00 p.m.	Beckford 11'; Tejada 84'	Report	Brett 58'; Nwegbo (yellow card) 90+5'	Stadium: Weidner Field; Attendance: 8,023; Referee: Natalie Simon

9 August 2023 22	Indy Eleven	4–0	Birmingham Legion	Indianapolis
6:00 p.m.	Guenzatti 24', 63'; Martínez (yellow card) 41', (goal) 65'; Molina 89'	Report	Martínez (yellow card) 48'; Nwegbo (yellow card) 49'; Brett (yellow card) 61'; Smith (yellow card) 90+1'	Stadium: Michael A. Carroll Stadium; Attendance: 7,194; Referee: Adam Kilpatrick

12 August 2023 23	Birmingham Legion	1–1	Sacramento Republic FC	Birmingham, Alabama
6:30 p.m.	Corcoran (yellow card) 34'; Mensah (yellow card) 48'; Smith 64'; Crognale (yellow card) 75'	Report	Archimède 83'; Donovan (yellow card) 89'; López (yellow card) 90+5'	Stadium: Protective Stadium; Attendance: 4,756; Referee: Gerald Flores

19 August 2023 24	Birmingham Legion	2–0	Louisville City FC	Birmingham, Alabama
5:30 p.m.	Martínez 5'; Brett 24' (pen.); Crognale (yellow card) 46'; Mensah (yellow card) 81'	Report	Jimenez (yellow card) 45+4'; Lancaster (yellow card) 59'; Charpie (yellow card) 90+6'	Stadium: Protective Stadium; Attendance: 4,306; Referee: Matthew Corrigan

23 August 2023 25	FC Tulsa	1–3	Birmingham Legion	Tulsa, Oklahoma
7:00 p.m.	Goodrum 14', (yellow card) 53'; Nelson (yellow card) 18'	Report	Brett 19' (pen.), 21', 33'; Agudelo (yellow card) 89'	Stadium: Oneok Field; Attendance: 3,927; Referee: Calin Radosav

27 August 2023 26	Birmingham Legion	2–3	Detroit City FC	Birmingham, Alabama
4:00 p.m.	Brett 29' (pen.); Martínez 38' (pen.); Mensah (yellow card) 48'; Lopez (yellow card) 66'	Report	Morris 31', 44'; Kavita 45' (o.g.)	Stadium: Protective Stadium; Attendance: 3,250; Referee: Greg Dopka

3 September 2023 27	San Diego Loyal SC	3–0	Birmingham Legion	San Diego
5:00 p.m.	Bodily 18'; Moshobane 39'; Martin (yellow card) 69', (goal) 84'	Report	Nwegbo (yellow card) 20'; Mensah (yellow card) 70'	Stadium: Torero Stadium; Attendance: 4,224; Referee: Joshua Encarnación

10 September 2023 28	Birmingham Legion	1–0	New Mexico United	Birmingham, Alabama
4:00 p.m.	Mensah (yellow card) 46'; Brett 73'	Report		Stadium: Protective Stadium; Attendance: 4,518; Referee: Jeremy Scheer

17 September 2023 29	Rio Grande Valley FC Toros	1–0	Birmingham Legion	Edinburg, Texas
7:00 p.m.	Cerro (yellow card) 22'; López 49'	Report	Lopez (yellow card) 34'; Corcoran (yellow card) 42'; Kasim (yellow card) 71'; Mensah (yellow card) 89'	Stadium: H-E-B Park; Attendance: 3,705; Referee: Alexis Da Silva

20 September 2023 30	Birmingham Legion	1–1	Memphis 901 FC	Birmingham, Alabama
7:00 p.m.	Kasim 48'; Crognale (yellow card) 55'; Agudelo (yellow card) 90'	Report	McFadden 52'; Peters (yellow card) 71'	Stadium: Protective Stadium; Attendance: 4,776; Referee: Matthew Corrigan

24 September 2023 31	Birmingham Legion	0–2	Miami FC	Birmingham, Alabama
5:30 p.m.	Lopez (yellow card) 19'	Report	Valot (yellow card) 22'; Ofeimu 35', (yellow card) 41'; Telfer (yellow card) 77'; Murphy 84'	Stadium: Protective Stadium; Attendance: 5,975; Referee: Abdou Ndiaye

30 September 2023 32	Memphis 901 FC	1–2	Birmingham Legion	Memphis, Tennessee
7:00 p.m.	Molloy (yellow card) 13'; Ward (yellow card) 28'; Rodrigo 40' (pen.)	Report	Nwegbo 46'; Brett 51'; Martínez (yellow card) 57'; Agudelo (yellow card) 90+8'	Stadium: AutoZone Park; Attendance: 3,237; Referee: Alejo Calume

8 October 2023 33	Birmingham Legion	2–0	Monterey Bay FC	Birmingham, Alabama
4:00 p.m.	Martínez (yellow card) 24'; Tabortetaka (yellow card) 28'; Agudelo (yellow card) 46', (goal) 60'; Crognale (yellow card) 52'; Kasim (yellow card) 73'; Smith 80'	Report	Okoli (yellow card) 36'	Stadium: Protective Stadium; Attendance: 6,329; Referee: Elvis Osmanovic

14 October 2023 34	Charleston Battery	1–0	Birmingham Legion	Mount Pleasant, South Carolina
4:00 p.m.	Markanich 33'; Segbers (yellow card) 64'; Rodríguez (yellow card) 67'; Muse (yellow card) 86'	Report	Pasher (yellow card) 60'; Kavita (yellow card) 64'; Rufe (yellow card) 64'	Stadium: Patriots Point Soccer Complex; Attendance: 3,265; Referee: Austin Saini

==== Playoffs ====
===== Conference Quarter-finals =====
October 21, 2023	Birmingham Legion	3–0	Tampa Bay Rowdies	St. Petersburg, Florida
7:30 PM EDT	Martínez (yellow card) 9'; Preston 41'; Nwegbo 57'; Kasim 77'	Report	Lasso (yellow card) 39'; Jennings (yellow card) 45+1'	Stadium: Al Lang Stadium; Attendance: 5,249; Referee: Matthew Thompson

===== Conference Semifinals =====
October 28, 2023	Charleston Battery	2–1	Birmingham Legion	Mount Pleasant, South Carolina
7:00 PM EDT	Ycaza 17'; Dodson 68'	Report	Kasim 41'; Agudelo (yellow card) 61'; Rufe (yellow card) 70'; Lopez (yellow card) 86'	Stadium: Patriots Point Soccer Complex; Attendance: 2,762; Referee: Elton Garcia

=== U.S. Open Cup ===
==== Second round ====
5 April 2023	Chattanooga Red Wolves SC (Tennessee)	1–4	(Alabama) Birmingham Legion	East Ridge, Tennessee
7:30 p.m. EDT	Lombardi 79'	Report	Agudelo 45+1', 63'; Smith 47'; Nwegbo 87'	Stadium: CHI Memorial Stadium; Attendance: 500; Referee: Benjamin Meyer

==== Third round ====
26 April 2023	Birmingham Legion (Alabama)	1–1 (a.e.t.) (4–3 p)	(Tennessee) Chattanooga FC	Tuscaloosa, Alabama
7:00 p.m. CDT	Kasim 31'	Report	Naglestad 68' (pen.)	Stadium: University of Alabama Soccer Stadium; Attendance: 150; Referee: Abdou Ndiaye
	Penalties
	Pasher (penalty scored); Agudelo (penalty missed); Gabriel Alves (penalty scored); Rufe (penalty scored); Martínez (penalty scored)		(penalty scored) Naglestad; (penalty missed) Dixon; (penalty scored) Prepeliță; (penalty scored) Mwape; (penalty missed) Alvarenga

==== Round of 32 ====
10 May 2023	Birmingham Legion (Alabama)	3–0	(Tennessee) Memphis 901 FC	Birmingham, Alabama
7:00 p.m. CDT	Agudelo 20'; Martínez 39'; Pasher 64'	Report		Stadium: Protective Stadium; Attendance: 3,150; Referee: Lorenzo Hernandez

==== Round of 16 ====
24 May 2023	Birmingham Legion (Alabama)	1–0	(North Carolina) Charlotte FC	Birmingham, Alabama
7:00 p.m. CDT	Kasim 60'	Report	Malanda (yellow card) 28' (yellow-red card) 51'	Stadium: Protective Stadium; Attendance: 12,722; Referee: Guido Gonzales Jr.

==== Quarter-finals ====
7 June 2023	Birmingham Legion (Alabama)	0–1	(Florida) Inter Miami CF	Birmingham, Alabama
7:00 p.m. CDT		Report	Stefanelli 56'	Stadium: Protective Stadium; Attendance: 18,418; Referee: Sergii Demianchuk
