= 2024 Birmingham Legion FC season =

American soccer club season

Birmingham Legion FC
2024 season
- General Manager: Jay Heaps
- Head Coach: Tom Soehn
- Stadium: Protective Stadium
- USL Championship: Eastern Conference: 9th
- Playoffs: DNQ
- U.S. Open Cup: Round of 32
- Top goalscorer: League: Stefano Pinho (10 goals); All: Stefano Pinho (13 goals)
Home colors	Away colors

The 2024 Birmingham Legion season was the sixth season of play in the club's history in the USL Championship, the second tier of American soccer.

== Squad Information ==
=== Roster ===
As of July 24, 2024

Note: Flags indicate national team as defined under FIFA eligibility rules; some limited exceptions apply. Players may hold more than one non-FIFA nationality.

No.	Pos.	Nation	Player
1	GK	(United States) USA	Matt Van Oekel
3	DF	(Democratic Republic of the Congo) COD	Phanuel Kavita
4	DF	(United States) USA	Ramiz Hamouda
5	MF	(United States) USA	Mikey Lopez
7	FW	(Nigeria) NGA	Diba Nwegbo
8	MF	(United States) USA	Kobe Hernandez-Foster
10	FW	(Ghana) GHA	Prosper Kasim
11	DF	(United States) USA	Dawson McCartney
13	DF	(United States) USA	Jake Rufe
14	DF	(United States) USA	Derek Dodson
15	FW	(Canada) CAN	Tyler Pasher
17	MF	(United States) USA	Matthew Corcoran

No.	Pos.	Nation	Player
18	GK	(United States) USA	Trevor Spangenberg
19	MF	(Uruguay) URU	Enzo Martínez
20	DF	(Grenada) GRN	A. J. Paterson
21	DF	(United States) USA	Alex Crognale
23	FW	(Cameroon) CMR	Tabort Etaka Preston
28	MF	(United States) USA	Miguel Perez (On loan from St. Louis City SC)
29	FW	(Brazil) BRA	Stéfano Pinho
30	GK	(United States) USA	Brock Marlow
33	DF	(Ghana) GHA	Moses Mensah
47	MF	(United States) USA	Finn Calloway
75	GK	(United States) USA	Owen Jack
77	FW	(Sierra Leone) SLE	Mohamed Buya Turay

== Competitions ==
=== Preseason ===
In preparation for the start of league play, the Birmingham Legion played in a preseason match against Chattanooga FC, a team in the third division league MLS Next Pro, away.

All times in Eastern Time Zone.

March 2, 2024	Chattanooga FC	0–3	Birmingham Legion	Chattanooga, Tennessee
2:00 p.m.		Report	Preston 18' 46'; Pasher 26' (pen.)	Stadium: Finley Stadium

=== USL Championship ===
==== Standings ====
Pos	Team	Pld	W	L	T	GF	GA	GD	Pts	Qualification
7	Pittsburgh Riverhounds SC	34	12	10	12	41	28	+13	48	Playoffs
8	North Carolina FC	34	13	12	9	54	43	+11	48	Playoffs
9	Birmingham Legion FC	34	13	15	6	44	51	−7	45	
10	Hartford Athletic	34	12	14	8	39	52	−13	44	
11	Loudoun United FC	34	11	14	9	44	39	+5	42	

Source: USL Championship Standings
Rules for classification: 1) head-to-head points; 2) head-to-head goal differential; 3) points-per game within conference; 4) total wins; 5) total goal differential; 6) total goals scored; 7) points earned against top four Conference finishers; 8) disciplinary points; 9) coin toss or drawing of lots

==== Match results ====
On December 18, 2023, the USL Championship released the regular season schedule for all 24 teams.

All times in Eastern Time Zone.

March 9, 2024 1	Phoenix Rising FC	0–1	Birmingham Legion	Phoenix, Arizona
9:30 pm	Formella (yellow card) 53'; Rito (yellow card) 71'	Report	Martínez (yellow card) 45'; Scearce 67' (o.g.); Crognale (yellow card) 73'; Nwegbo (yellow card) 76'; Hernandez-Foster (yellow card) 76'	Stadium: Phoenix Rising Soccer Stadium; Attendance: 8,187; Referee: Elvis Osmanovic

March 23, 2024 2	Hartford Athletic	1–0	Birmingham Legion	Hartford, Connecticut
2:00 pm	Ngalina 23'; Asiedu (yellow card) 60'	Report		Stadium: Trinity Health Stadium; Attendance: 2,969; Referee: Greg Dopka

March 30, 2024 3	Louisville City FC	5–0	Birmingham Legion	Louisville, Kentucky
4:00 pm	Morris 13'; Wilson (yellow card) 17'; Harris 35', 66'; Wynder (yellow card) 68'; Davila (yellow card) 70', (goal) 73'; Serrano 82'	Report	Pasher (yellow card) 61'; Crognale (yellow card) 64'; Paterson (yellow card) 76'; Kavita (yellow card) 78'	Stadium: Lynn Family Stadium; Attendance: 8,973; Referee: Calin Radosav; Assistant referees: Mike Nickerson; Eric Burton; Fourth official: Shawn Westerfield

April 7, 2024 4	Birmingham Legion	3–1	Loudoun United FC	Birmingham, Alabama
6:30 pm	Mensah (yellow card) 45'; Leerman 67' (o.g.); Pasher 74'; Murana 90'+6'	Report	McCabe (yellow card) 22'; Aboukoura 48'; Erlandson (yellow card) 60'	Stadium: Protective Stadium; Attendance: 2,112; Referee: Melvin Rivas

April 14, 2024 5	North Carolina FC	1–1	Birmingham Legion	Cary, North Carolina
5:00 pm	da Costa 2' (pen.)	Report	Martinez 23' (yellow card) 58'; Paterson (yellow card) 31'; Perez (yellow card) 90'+5'	Stadium: WakeMed Soccer Park; Attendance: 1,807; Referee: Velimir Stefanovic

April 20, 2024 6	Miami FC	0–1	Birmingham Legion	Miami, Florida
7:00 pm	Molina (yellow card) 51'; Luis Pedro (yellow card) 82'; Cardona (yellow card) 88'	Report	Mensah (yellow card) 60'; Stefano Pinho 62'; Hernandez-Foster (yellow card) 70'; Martínez (yellow card) 89'	Stadium: Riccardo Silva Stadium; Attendance: 1,092; Referee: (United States) Lorenzo Hernandez

April 27, 2024 7	Birmingham Legion	0–3	Memphis 901 FC	Birmingham, Alabama
7:30 pm	Kavita (yellow card) 72'; Hernandez-Foster (yellow card) 90'+4'	Report	Lapa 4', 54'; Turci 17'; Fernando (yellow card) 45'+3'; Ward (yellow card) 81'	Stadium: Protective Stadium; Attendance: 2,541; Referee: Alejo Calume

May 4, 2024 8	Birmingham Legion	2–2	FC Tulsa	Birmingham, Alabama
7:30 pm	Martínez 71'; Pinho 90+4'	Report	Goodrum 21'; Stojanovic 57'	Stadium: Protective Stadium; Attendance: 2,541; Referee: Nabil Bensalah

May 11, 2024 9	Tampa Bay Rowdies	0–1	Birmingham Legion	St. Petersburg, Florida
7:30 pm	Guillen (yellow card) 80'	Report	Kavita (yellow card) 9'; Murana (yellow card) 32'; Hernandez-Foster (yellow card) 37'; Martínez 67'; Pasher (yellow card) 90'+1'	Stadium: Al Lang Stadium; Attendance: 5,433; Referee: Elton García

May 15, 2024 10	Birmingham Legion	0–1	Charleston Battery	Birmingham, Alabama
8:00 pm	Martínez (yellow card) 46'; Crognale (yellow card) 74'; Tabortetaka (yellow card) 86'	Report	Ycaza 61'; Molloy (yellow card) 69'; Conway (yellow card) 88'	Stadium: Protective Stadium; Attendance: 3,937; Referee: Jeremy Scheer

May 25, 2024 11	Sacramento Republic FC	0–0	Birmingham Legion	Sacramento, California
10:00 pm	Timmer (yellow card) 13'; Nick Ross (yellow card) 22'; Gurr (yellow card) 89'; Herrera (red card) 89'	Report	Rufe (yellow card) 88'; Kavita (yellow card) 90'	Stadium: Heart Health Park; Attendance: 10,188; Referee: Brandon Stevis

June 1, 2024 12	El Paso Locomotive FC	1–3	Birmingham Legion	El Paso, Texas
8:00 pm	Craig (yellow card) 29'; Dhillon 44'	Report	McCartney 26'; Pasher (yellow card) 34'; Prosper 45'+3'; McCartney (yellow card) 45'+7'; Pasher 64'	Stadium: Southwest University Park; Attendance: 5,707; Referee: John Matto

June 9, 2024 13	Birmingham Legion	0–1	Indy Eleven	Birmingham, Alabama
7:00 pm		Report	Blake pen' (34)	Stadium: Protective Stadium; Attendance: 5,147; Referee: Natalie Simon

June 19, 2024 14	Birmingham Legion	3–0	San Antonio FC	Birmingham, Alabama
8:00 pm	Rufe (yellow card) 16'; Crognale 51'; Tabort Etaka 55'; Pasher 87'	Report	Gomez (yellow card) 51'; Taintor (yellow card) 65'	Stadium: Protective Stadium; Attendance: 1,996; Referee: Elvis Osmanovic

June 25, 2024 15	Detroit City FC	1–2	Birmingham Legion	Hamtramack, Michigan
7:00 pm	Rh. Williams 39'	Report	Pasher (yellow card) 64'; Dodson 82'; Kavita (yellow card) 86', (goal) 88'	Stadium: Keyworth Stadium; Attendance: 6,244; Referee: Abdou Ndiaye

June 29, 2024 16	Birmingham Legion	1–4	Louisville City FC	Birmingham, Alabama
7:30 pm	Tabort Etaka 82'	Report	Charpie (yellow card) 17'; Gonzalez (yellow card) 41'; Ordoñez (yellow card) 45+4'; Gleadle 51'; Harris 58'; Serrano 80'; Showunmi 87'	Stadium: Protective Stadium; Attendance: 5,011; Referee: Joshua Encarnacion; Assistant referees: Nicholas Balcer; Sarah Gaddes; Fourth official: Joshua Belk

July 6, 2024 17	Charleston Battery	2–0	Birmingham Legion	Mount Pleasant, South Carolina
7:00 pm	Markanich 43' (pen.) 70'	Report	Prosper (yellow card) 21'; Crognale (yellow card) 40'; Kavita (yellow card) 54'; Perez (yellow card) 90'	Stadium: Patriots Point Soccer Complex; Attendance: 3,396; Referee: Lorenzo Hernandez

July 13, 2024 18	Birmingham Legion	2–1	Colorado Springs Switchbacks FC	Birmingham, Alabama
8:30 pm	McCartney 45'+1'; Paterson (yellow card) 69'; Pinho 85'	Report	Zandi 11'	Stadium: Protective Stadium; Attendance: 1,704; Referee: Adam Kilpatrick

July 17, 2024 19	Birmingham Legion	1–3	Rhode Island FC	Birmingham, Alabama
8:00 pm	Crognale (yellow card) 31'; Kasim 50'; Paterson (yellow card) 78'	Report	Fuson 1'; Dikwa (yellow card) 7'; Ybarra (yellow card) 13'; Herivaux 68', 77'	Stadium: Protective Stadium; Attendance: 4,136; Referee: Benjamin Meyer

July 20, 2024 20	New Mexico United	1–1	Birmingham Legion	Albuquerque, New Mexico
9:00 pm	Rivas 60'; Bailey (yellow card) 65'; Maples (yellow card) 66'; Tabakis (yellow card) 81'	Report	Hamouda (yellow card) 15'; Paterson 81'	Stadium: Isotopes Park; Attendance: 9,096; Referee: Luis Arroyo

July 27, 2024 21	Birmingham Legion	3–0	Orange County SC	Birmingham, Alabama
7:30 pm	Pinho 51', 89'; Martínez (yellow card) 85'; Pasher 90'+5'	Report	Flood (yellow card) 3'; Nakkim (yellow card) 10'; Scott (yellow card) 10'; Lambe (yellow card) 86'	Stadium: Protective Stadium; Attendance: 4,023; Referee: Matthew Thompson

August 3, 2024 22	Birmingham Legion FC	2–2	Hartford Athletic	Birmingham, Alabama
7:30 pm	Martínez 32'; McCartney 38'; Paterson (yellow card) 47'	Report	Mamadou 72'; Ngalina 87' (pen.)	Stadium: Protective Stadium; Attendance: 4,017; Referee: Corbyn May

August 10, 2024 23	Monterey Bay FC	1–2	Birmingham Legion	Seaside, California
10:00 pm	Rebollar (yellow card) 16'; Fehr (yellow card) 54'; Trager 60'	Report	Hernandez-Foster 33' (yellow card) 45'; Pinho 48'; Crognale (red card) 71'	Stadium: Cardinale Stadium; Attendance: 4,009; Referee: Muhammad Hassan

August 16, 2024 24	Birmingham Legion FC	0–1	Detroit City FC	Birmingham, Alabama
8:00 pm	Pinho (yellow card) 90+3'	Report	Levis 32'; Sheldon (yellow card) 75'	Stadium: Protective Stadium; Attendance: 4,123; Referee: Calin Radosav

August 24, 2024 25	Birmingham Legion FC	0–3	Pittsburgh Riverhounds SC	Birmingham, AL
7:00 pm	Zouhir (yellow card) 27'; McCartney (yellow card) 43'; Dodson (yellow card) 83'; Hernandez-Foster (yellow card) 90'+4'	Report	Kizza 34', 39'; Biasi (yellow card) 79'; Johnson 84'	Stadium: Protective Stadium; Attendance: 3,945; Referee: Gerald Flores

August 31, 2024 26	Rhode Island FC	2–0	Birmingham Legion	Smithfield, Rhode Island
4:00 pm	Duggan (yellow card) 19'; Turnbull 71' (yellow card) 72'; Kwizera (yellow card) 89'; Williams 90'; Brito (yellow card) 90+3'	Report	Crognale (yellow card) 30'; Paterson (yellow card) 90+3'	Stadium: Beirne Stadium; Attendance: 3,713; Referee: Greg Dopka

September 11, 2024 27	Birmingham Legion FC	2–0	Tampa Bay Rowdies	Birmingham, Alabama
7:00 pm	Hernandez-Foster (yellow card) 13', (goal) 86'; Pinho (yellow card) 32', (goal) 36'; Mensah (yellow card) 43'; Dodson (yellow card) 48'; Nwegbo (yellow card) 58'	Report	Kleemann (yellow card) 55'; Crisostomo (yellow card) 71'	Stadium: Protective Stadium; Attendance: 5,058; Referee: Lorenzo Hernandez

September 14, 2024 28	Loudoun United FC	4–2	Birmingham Legion	Leesburg, Virginia
7:00 pm	Hughes (yellow card) 36'; Erlandson 48'; Johnston 56'; Ryan 69'; Williamson 78'; Valot 90'	Report	Crognale 15'; Martínez (yellow card) 19'; McCartney (yellow card) 62'; Nwegbo 63'	Stadium: Segra Field; Attendance: 3,120; Referee: Muhammad Hassan

September 22, 2024 29	Birmingham Legion	1–0	Miami FC	Birmingham, Alabama
5:00 pm	Zouhir (yellow card) 39'; Martínez (yellow card) 90'; Matheus 90'+4'	Report		Stadium: Protective Stadium; Attendance: 4,279; Referee: Benjamin Meyer

September 28, 2024 30	Pittsburgh Riverhounds SC	1–1	Birmingham Legion	Pittsburgh, Pennsylvania
7:00 pm	Kizza 22'; Hogan (yellow card) 72'; Johnson (yellow card) 90'+4'	Report	McCartney (yellow card) 25'; Nwegbo (yellow card) 33'; Pinho 79'	Stadium: Highmark Stadium; Attendance: 5,537; Referee: Elvis Osmanovic

October 6, 2024 31	Birmingham Legion	2–3	North Carolina FC	Birmingham, Alabama
6:00 pm	Martínez 32'; Rufe (yellow card) 45'+3'; Hernandez-Foster (yellow card) 46'; Zouhir (yellow card) 80' (goal) 89'	Report	Armstrong 8', 65'; Anderson 59'	Stadium: Protective Stadium; Attendance: 3,012; Referee: Alejo Calume

October 13, 2023 32	Birmingham Legion	0–3	Las Vegas Lights FC	Birmingham, Alabama
7:00 pm	Hernandez-Foster (yellow card) 5'; Rufe (yellow card) 45'; Tabortetaka (yellow card) 64'	Report	Gyau 18'; Bennett (yellow card) 73'; Gannon 87'; Pinzon 90'+3'	Stadium: Protective Stadium; Attendance: 4,761; Referee: Ricardo Fierro

October 19, 2024 33	Indy Eleven	3–2	Birmingham Legion	Indianapolis, Indiana
7:00 pm	Kavita 14' (o.g.); Blake 15'; A. Williams (yellow card) 79'; Wootton 86'	Report	Pinho 54'; Zouhir 90'	Stadium: IU Michael A. Carroll Track & Soccer Stadium; Attendance: 10,540; Referee: Matthew Corrigan

October 14, 2023 34	Oakland Roots SC	0–5	Birmingham Legion	Hayward, California
10:00 pm	Hackshaw (yellow card) 24'	Report	Tabortetaka 21', 40'; Pinho 31'; Nwegbo 35'; Martínez 87' (yellow card) 69' (yellow-red card) 90'+1'	Stadium: Pioneer Stadium; Attendance: 4,995; Referee: Elton García

=== U.S. Open Cup ===
As a member of the USL Championship, the Birmingham Legion were matched up against the Chattanooga Red Wolves SC, a fellow team governed by the United Soccer League in the third division USL League One, at home. After winning in added extra time 4-2 after forward Stefano Pinho scored four goals, the Legion were matched up against fellow USL Championship club Tampa Bay Rowdies away, where they would come back and force added extra time after being down by four goals in regular time, before eventually losing 6-4.

April 17 Third Round	Birmingham Legion FC (USLC) (Alabama)	4–2 (a.e.t.)	(Tennessee) Chattanooga Red Wolves SC (USL1)	Montevallo, Alabama
	Rufe (yellow card) 13'; Martínez (yellow card) 34'; Pinho 48', 80', 105+1', 107'; Tabortetaka (yellow card) 57'; Van Oekel (yellow card) 75'	Report	Folla 12' (yellow card) 82'; Ruiz 76' (pen.); Fernandes (red card) 90'+1'	Stadium: University of Montevallo; Attendance: 300; Referee: Kyle Johnston

May 8 Round of 32	Tampa Bay Rowdies (Florida)	6–4 (a.e.t.)	(Alabama) Birmingham Legion FC	St. Petersburg, Florida
19:30	Dennis (yellow card) 23'; Rivera 25'; Jennings 33', 45+6', 79'; Munjoma (yellow card) 82'; Arteaga 101', 109' (yellow card) 90'+3' (yellow-red card) 120'+3'	Report	Mensah (yellow card) 42'; Paterson (yellow card) 50'; Martínez 82'; Hernandez-Foster 89'; Pasher 90+3', 90+6' (pen.); Crognale (yellow card) 91'; Rufe (yellow card) 120'	Stadium: Al Lang Stadium; Attendance: 2,195; Referee: Alyssa Nichols
