= List of Birmingham Legion FC seasons =

The American soccer club Birmingham Legion FC has competed in the USL Championship since 2019, following the club's founding in 2017. The following list includes each season of the club's existence, documenting its performance in all competitive competitions.

== Key ==
Key to competitions

- USL Championship (USLC) – The second division of soccer in the United States, established in 2010 and previously known as USL and USL Pro. The Championship was the third division of American soccer from its founding until its elevation to second division status in 2017.
- U.S. Open Cup (USOC) – The premier knockout cup competition in US soccer, first contested in 1914.
- CONCACAF Champions League (CCL) – The premier competition in North American soccer since 1962. It went by the name of Champions' Cup until 2008.

Key to colors and symbols

1st or W	Winners
2nd or RU	Runners-up
Last	Wooden Spoon
♦	League Golden Boot
	Highest average attendance

Key to league record

- Season = The year and article of the season
- Div = Level on pyramid
- League = League name
- Pld = Games played
- W = Games won
- L = Games lost
- D = Games drawn
- GF = Goals scored
- GA = Goals against
- Pts = Points
- PPG = Points per game
- Conf = Conference position
- Overall = League position

Key to cup record

- DNE = Did not enter
- DNQ = Did not qualify
- NH = Competition not held or canceled
- QR = Qualifying round
- PR = Preliminary round
- GS = Group stage
- R1 = First round
- R2 = Second round
- R3 = Third round
- R4 = Fourth round
- R5 = Fifth round
- QF = Quarterfinals
- SF = Semifinals
- RU = Runners-up
- W = Winners

== Seasons ==
Season	League											Position		Playoffs	USOC	Continental / Other	Average attendance	Top goalscorer(s)	
Season	Div	League	Pld	W	L	D	GF	GA	GD	Pts	PPG	Conf.	Overall	Playoffs	USOC	Continental / Other	Average attendance	Name	Goals
2019	2	USLC	34	12	15	7	35	51	-16	43	1.26	10th	21st	QF	R3	DNQ	3,307	(Ghana) Prosper Kasim (United States) JJ Williams	7
2020	2	USLC	16	7	4	5	29	19	10	25	1.56	7th	14th	QF	NH	DNQ	1,250	(Jamaica) Neco Brett	7
2021	2	USLC	32	18	8	6	51	31	+20	60	1.63	3nd	5th	SF	NH	DNQ	4,389	(Jamaica) Neco Brett	18♦
2022	2	USLC	34	17	10	7	56	37	+19	58	1.71	4th	6th	QF	R3	DNQ	5,405	(Uruguay) Enzo Martínez	15
2023	2	USLC	34	14	16	4	44	53	-9	46	1.35	7th	15th	SF	QF	DNQ	5,091	(Jamaica) Neco Brett	12
2024	2	USLC	34	13	15	6	44	51	-7	45	1.32	9th	15th	DNQ	R32	DNQ	3,708	(Brazil) Stefano Pinho	10
2025	2	USLC	30	5	13	12	36	50	-14	27	0.90	12th	23rd	DNQ	R1	DNQ	4,470	(Haiti) Ronaldo Damus	11
Total	–	–	214	86	81	47	295	292	+3	304	-	–	–	–	–	–	–	(Jamaica) Neco Brett	39

1. Avg. attendance only includes statistics from regular season matches.
2. Top goalscorer(s) includes all goals scored in the regular season, playoffs, U.S. Open Cup, and other competitive matches.
