= 2022 Birmingham Legion FC season =

Birmingham Legion FC
2022 season
- President and general manager: Jay Heaps
- Head coach: Tom Soehn
- Stadium: Protective Stadium
- USL Championship: Eastern Conference: 4th
- Playoffs: Conference Semifinals
- U.S. Open Cup: Quarter-finals
colors	Away colors	Third colors

The 2022 Birmingham Legion season was the fourth season of play in the club's history in the USL Championship, the second division of American soccer.

== Squad information ==
=== Roster ===
As of July 8, 2022

No.	Pos.	Player	Nation
1	GK	USA	Matt Van Oekel
3	DF	COD	Phanuel Kavita
4	DF	USA	Freddy Kleemann (on loan from Austin FC)
5	MF	USA	Mikey Lopez
6	MF	GHA	Anderson Asiedu
7	DF	CAN	Ryan James
8	MF	BRA	Bruno Lapa
9	FW	CRO	Edi Horvat
10	FW	GHA	Prosper Kasim
11	FW	BRA	Marlon
13	MF	USA	Jake Rufe
17	MF	USA	Matthew Corcoran
18	GK	USA	Trevor Spangenberg
19	MF	URU	Enzo Martínez
20	MF	HAI	Zachary Herivaux
21	DF	USA	Alex Crognale
23	MF	USA	Grayson Dupont
24	DF	USA	Jonny Dean
29	FW	ENG	Sadik Balarabe
47	FW	CAN	Mataeo Bunbury
99	FW	USA	Juan Agudelo

1. USL Academy Contract

== Competitions ==
=== USL Championship ===
==== Eastern Conference ====
Pos	Team	Pld	W	L	T	GF	GA	GD	Pts	Qualification
2	Memphis 901 FC	34	21	8	5	67	33	+34	68	Playoffs
3	Tampa Bay Rowdies	34	20	7	7	73	33	+40	67	Playoffs
4	Birmingham Legion FC	34	17	10	7	56	37	+19	58	Playoffs
5	Pittsburgh Riverhounds SC	34	16	9	9	50	38	+12	57	Playoffs
6	Miami FC	34	15	9	10	47	32	+15	55	Playoffs

Source: USL Championship Standings
Rules for classification: 1) head-to-head points; 2) head-to-head goal differential; 3) points-per game within conference; 4) total wins; 5) total goal differential; 6) total goals scored; 7) points earned against top four Conference finishers; 8) disciplinary points; 9) coin toss or drawing of lots

==== Regular season ====
On January 12, 2022, the Legion released the schedule for their 2022 season.

All times in Central Time Zone.

March 13, 2022 1	Birmingham Legion	1–1	Tampa Bay Rowdies	Birmingham, Alabama
6:00 p.m.	Marlon 86'	Report	Dalgaard 34'	Stadium: Protective Stadium; Attendance: 9,277

March 19, 2022 2	FC Tulsa	3–1	Birmingham Legion	Tulsa, Oklahoma
7:30 p.m.	da Costa 12'; Rivas 45+4' (pen.); Arauz 90+5'	Report	Crognale (yellow card) 10' (yellow-red card) 78'; Prosper 41'	Stadium: ONEOK Field; Attendance: 4,531; Referee: DeShun Beard

March 26, 2022 3	Birmingham Legion	0–2	Colorado Springs Switchbacks FC	Birmingham, Alabama
6:30 p.m.		Report	Ngalina 70'; Mines 89'	Stadium: Protective Stadium; Attendance: 5,122; Referee: Izlen Peksenar

April 2, 2022 4	Birmingham Legion	0–0	Louisville City FC	Birmingham, Alabama
7:30 p.m.		Report	Matsoso (red card) 42'	Stadium: Protective Stadium; Attendance: 5,075; Referee: Elton García

April 10, 2022 5	Birmingham Legion	2–1	Hartford Athletic	Birmingham, Alabama
6:00 p.m.	Agudelo 37' (pen.); Asiedu 90+3'	Report	Apollon 43'	Stadium: Protective Stadium; Attendance: 4,207; Referee: Sergii Demianchuk

April 15, 2022 6	Detroit City FC	1–0	Birmingham Legion	Hamtramck, Michigan
8:00 p.m.	Hoppenot 63'	Report		Stadium: Keyworth Stadium; Attendance: 4,505; Referee: Matthew Franz

April 24, 2022 7	Loudoun United FC	1–2	Birmingham Legion	Leesburg, Virginia
3:00 p.m.	Sargis (red card) 71'; Zanne 80'	Report	Martinez 62'; Diop 79'	Stadium: Segra Field; Attendance: 1,523; Referee: Elvis Osmanovic

April 27, 2022 8	Birmingham Legion	2–1	Charleston Battery	Birmingham, Alabama
7:00 p.m.	Prosper 11', 72'; Asiedu (yellow card) 23'	Report	Apodaca 83'	Stadium: Protective Stadium; Referee: Jeremy Scheer

May 4, 2022 9	Birmingham Legion	0–0	Miami FC	Birmingham, Alabama
7:00 p.m.		Report		Stadium: Protective Stadium; Referee: Adam Kilpatrick

May 7, 2022 10	Pittsburgh Riverhounds SC	1–0	Birmingham Legion	Pittsburgh, Pennsylvania
12:00 p.m.	Griffin 4'	Report		Stadium: Highmark Stadium; Attendance: 3,479; Referee: Joshua Encarnación

May 18, 2022 11	Birmingham Legion	0–0	Las Vegas Lights FC	Birmingham, Alabama
7:00 p.m.		Report		Stadium: Protective Stadium; Referee: Benjamin Meyer

May 27, 2022 12	New York Red Bulls II	1–2	Birmingham Legion	Montclair, New Jersey
6:00 p.m.	Adebayo-Smith 25'	Report	Martinez 12'; Lopes 81'	Stadium: MSU Soccer Park; Attendance: 246; Referee: Jose Carlos Rivero

June 4, 2022 13	Phoenix Rising FC	0–1	Birmingham Legion	Chandler, Arizona
9:30 p.m.		Report	Prosper 58'	Stadium: Phoenix Rising Soccer Complex at Wild Horse Pass; Referee: Gerald Flores

June 8, 2022 14	Birmingham Legion	1–0	Memphis 901 FC	Birmingham, Alabama
7:00 p.m.	Asiedu 90'	Report		Stadium: Protective Stadium; Referee: Abdou Ndiaye

June 25, 2022 15	New Mexico United	0–2	Birmingham Legion	Albuquerque, New Mexico
6:00 p.m.		Report	Agudelo 21'; Martinez 30'	Stadium: Isotopes Park; Attendance: 12,527; Referee: Melvin Rivas

July 2, 2022 16	Louisville City FC	2–1	Birmingham Legion	Louisville, Kentucky
7:00 p.m.	Wynder 32'; Totsch 83' (pen.)	Report	Martinez 52'; Lopez (yellow card) 57' (yellow-red card) 65'	Stadium: Lynn Family Stadium; Attendance: 9,627; Referee: John Griggs

July 6, 2022 17	Atlanta United 2	3–3	Birmingham Legion	Kennesaw, Georgia
6:30 p.m.	Brennan 65'; Trager 67'; Firmino 90+2'	Report	Martinez 9'; Lapa 49'; Herivaux 74'	Stadium: Fifth Third Bank Stadium; Attendance: 551; Referee: DeShun Beard

July 9, 2022 18	Charleston Battery	0–3	Birmingham Legion	Mount Pleasant, South Carolina
8:00 p.m.		Report	Dean 22'; Martinez 48'; James 71'	Stadium: Patriots Point Soccer Complex; Attendance: 2,214; Referee: Alex Billeter

July 16, 2022 19	Sacramento Republic FC	0–1	Birmingham Legion	Sacramento, California
10:00 p.m.		Report	Agudelo 2'	Stadium: Heart Health Park; Attendance: 9,161; Referee: Corbyn May

July 23, 2022 20	Birmingham Legion	0–2	FC Tulsa	Birmingham, Alabama
6:30 p.m.	James (yellow card) 40' (yellow-red card) 59'	Report	Moloto 16'; Williams 90+2'	Stadium: Protective Stadium; Attendance: 6,722; Referee: Sergii Demianchuk

July 27, 2022 21	Birmingham Legion	6–1	Loudoun United FC	Birmingham, Alabama
7:00 p.m.	Lapa 22', 43', 49' (pen.); Prosper 31' (pen.); Bunbury 88' (pen.); Dupont 90+3'	Report	Landry (red card) 48'; Fletcher 54'	Stadium: Protective Stadium; Referee: Sergii Demianchuk

July 30, 2022 22	Hartford Athletic	0–1	Birmingham Legion	Hartford, Connecticut
8:00 p.m.		Report	Martinez 90+1'	Stadium: Trinity Health Stadium; Attendance: 4,676; Referee: Christian Centeno

August 6, 2022 23	Birmingham Legion	6–0	Atlanta United 2	Birmingham, Alabama
7:00 p.m.	Martinez 2', 74'; Prosper 37' (pen.); Lopes 39'; Agudelo 43'; Balarabe 87'	Report		Stadium: Protective Stadium; Referee: Jervis Atagana

August 13, 2022 24	Birmingham Legion	1–0	San Diego Loyal SC	Birmingham, Alabama
6:30 p.m.	Agudelo 20'	Report		Stadium: Protective Stadium; Referee: Gerald Flores

August 17, 2023 25	Birmingham Legion	1–2	Detroit City FC	Birmingham, Alabama
6:30 p.m.	Prosper 68'	Report	Rutz 66'; Lewis 82'	Stadium: Protective Stadium; Attendance: 6,722; Referee: Elvis Osmanovic

August 20, 2022 26	Memphis 901 FC	2–4	Birmingham Legion	Memphis, Tennessee
7:30 p.m.	Fernando 18'; Kelly 61'	Report	Agudelo 28' (pen.); Crognale 44'; Lopes 59'; Martínez 70'	Stadium: AutoZone Park; Attendance: 3,759; Referee: Matthew Franz

August 28, 2022 27	Birmingham Legion	3–1	New York Red Bulls II	Birmingham, Alabama
4:00 p.m.	Dean 38'; Agudelo 49' (pen.); Martinez 74'	Report	Adebayo-Smith 25' (pen.)	Stadium: Protective Stadium; Referee: John Matto

September 3, 2022 28	Miami FC	1–1	Birmingham Legion	Miami, Florida
6:00 p.m.	Walker 32'	Report	Lapa 69'	Stadium: FIU Stadium; Attendance: 953; Referee: Elijio Arreguin

September 10, 2022 29	Indy Eleven	4–3	Birmingham Legion	Indianapolis, Indiana
6:00 p.m.	Hackshaw 11', 16'; Tejada 31'; Pinho 78'	Report	Martínez 35'; Lopes 62', 71'	Stadium: Michael A. Carroll Stadium; Attendance: 10,104; Referee: Jeremy Scheer

September 14, 2022 30	Birmingham Legion	2–1	Pittsburgh Riverhounds SC	Birmingham, Alabama
7:00 p.m.	Martinez 50'; Balarabe 67'	Report	Lega 38'; Peters (yellow card) 74' (yellow-red card) 90+1'	Stadium: Protective Stadium; Referee: Greg Dopka

September 23, 2022 31	Tampa Bay Rowdies	1–1	Birmingham Legion	St. Petersburg, Florida
6:30 p.m.	Fernandes 17'	Report	Lopes 10'	Stadium: Al Lang Stadium; Attendance: 5,150; Referee: Adam Kilpatrick

October 1, 2022 32	Oakland Roots SC	2–1	Birmingham Legion	Oakland, California
1:00 p.m.	Karlsson 24'; Azócar 84'	Report	Martínez 21'	Stadium: Laney College Football Stadium; Attendance: 5,509; Referee: Matthew Corrigan

October 9, 2022 33	Birmingham Legion	1–2	San Antonio FC	Birmingham, Alabama
6:30 p.m.	Lopes 19' (pen.)	Report	Bailone 41'; Patino 84'	Stadium: Protective Stadium; Attendance: 6,722; Referee: Sergii Demianchuk

October 12, 2022 34	Birmingham Legion	3–1	Indy Eleven	Birmingham, Alabama
7:00 p.m.	Martínez 25'; Prosper 29'; Lopes 61' (pen.)	Report	Hackshaw (yellow card) 45+1' (yellow-red card); Pinho 83'	Stadium: Protective Stadium; Referee: John Griggs

==== Playoffs ====
===== Conference Quarter-finals =====
October 23 East Quarterfinals	Birmingham Legion FC	2–2 (a.e.t.) (7–8 p)	Pittsburgh Riverhounds SC	Birmingham, Alabama
6:00 PM EDT	Kasim 72'; Lapa 99' (yellow card) 100'	Report	Wiedt (yellow card) 57'; Kizza 90', 116' (yellow card) 120+9'	Stadium: Protective Stadium; Attendance: 10,227; Referee: Eric Tattersall
	Penalties
	Crognale (penalty missed); Lapa (penalty missed); Dean (penalty scored); James (penalty scored); Martinez (penalty scored); Balarabe (penalty scored); Rufe (penalty scored); Lopez (penalty scored); Kavita (penalty scored); Dupont (penalty missed)		(penalty scored) Sims; (penalty scored) Griffin; (penalty scored) Dikwa; (penalty missed) Cicerone; (penalty missed) Eyang; (penalty scored) Ybarra; (penalty scored) Ordoñez; (penalty scored) Kelly; (penalty scored) Peters; (penalty scored) Kizza

=== U.S. Open Cup ===
As a member of the USL Championship, the Legion entered the U.S. Open Cup in the second round, drawn against amateur club Southern States SC of the NPSL. After winning comfortably 3–1, the Legion were match up against third division side South Georgia Tormenta FC of the USL League One, where they would lose at home 0–2.

April 7 Second round	Birmingham Legion FC (USLC) (Alabama)	3–1	(Mississippi) Southern States SC (NPSL)	Tuscaloosa, Alabama
7:00 pm CDT	Kasim 48'; Lapa 62'; Marlon 63'		Mason Walsh 73'	Stadium: Alabama Soccer Stadium; Referee: Benjamin Meyer

April 19 Third round	Birmingham Legion FC (USLC) (Alabama)	0–2	(Georgia (U.S. state)) South Georgia Tormenta FC (USL1)	Tuscaloosa, Alabama
7:00 pm CDT		Report	Thorn 33'; Dengler 45'	Stadium: Alabama Soccer Stadium; Referee: Sergii Demianchuk
