= 2021 Birmingham Legion FC season =

Birmingham Legion FC
2021 season
- Owners: List: Jack Bryant Billy Harbert John Harbert Jeff Logan James Outland Jim Rein Lee Styslinger III
- Head coach: Tom Soehn
- Stadium: BBVA Field
- USL Championship: Central Div.: 2nd
- USL Championship Playoffs: Conf. Semifinals
- Biggest win: BIR 6–0 SKC (10/24)
- Biggest defeat: LOU 2–0 BIR (6/16); TUL 3–1 BIR (8/17)
Home colors	Away colors	Third colors

The 2021 Birmingham Legion FC season was the club's third season of existence and their third in the USL Championship, the second tier of American soccer.

== Roster ==
As of May 17, 2021

No.	Pos.	Nation	Player
0	GK	USA	Ford Parker
1	GK	USA	Matt Van Oekel
2	MF	USA	Marcos Ugarte
3	DF	COD	Phanuel Kavita
4	DF	USA	Freddy Kleemann (on loan from Austin FC)
5	MF	USA	Mikey Lopez
6	MF	GHA	Anderson Asiedu
7	DF	CAN	Ryan James
8	MF	BRA	Bruno Lapa
10	FW	GHA	Prosper Kasim
11	FW	JAM	Neco Brett
12	MF	USA	Eli Crognale
13	DF	USA	Jake Rufe
16	MF	JPN	Daigo Kobayashi
17	MF	PUR	Jaden Servania
18	GK	USA	Trevor Spangenberg
20	MF	HAI	Zach Herivaux
21	DF	USA	Alex Crognale
22	DF	USA	Ben Ofeimu
23	FW	USA	JJ Williams
24	DF	USA	Jonathan Dean
25	MF	USA	Jackson Wrobel
77	FW	JAM	Junior Flemmings

1. USL Academy Contract

== Competitions ==
=== Exhibitions ===
March 13 Preseason 1	Birmingham Legion	2–0	Chattanooga FC
		Report

March 28 Preseason 2	Birmingham Legion	0–0	Atlanta United FC	Birmingham, AL
11:30 AM CDT		Report		Stadium: BBVA Field

March 28 Preseason 3	Birmingham Legion	0–1	Atlanta United FC	Birmingham, AL
02:00 PM CDT		Report	Walkes 33'	Stadium: BBVA Field

April 9 Preseason 4	Birmingham Legion	Cancelled	Nashville SC
		Report

April 17 Preseason 5	Birmingham Legion	4–1	Chattanooga Red Wolves SC	Birmingham, AL
10:30 AM CDT		Report		Stadium: BBVA Field

=== USL Championship ===
==== Standings — Central Division ====
Pos	Team	Pld	W	L	T	GF	GA	GD	Pts	Qualification
1	Louisville City FC	32	18	7	7	61	37	+24	61	Advance to USL Championship Playoffs
2	Birmingham Legion FC	32	18	8	6	51	31	+20	60	Advance to USL Championship Playoffs
3	Memphis 901 FC	32	14	10	8	47	42	+5	50	Advance to USL Championship Playoffs
4	FC Tulsa	32	14	13	5	49	48	+1	47	Advance to USL Championship Playoffs
5	OKC Energy FC	32	8	11	13	30	38	−8	37	

Source: USL

==== Results summary ====
Overall								Home						Away					
Pld	W	D	L	GF	GA	GD	Pts	W	D	L	GF	GA	GD	W	D	L	GF	GA	GD
9	5	1	3	9	8	+1	16	3	0	1	4	2	+2	2	1	2	5	6	−1

Source: USLC Standings

==== Results by round ====
Round	1	2	3	4	5	6	7	8	9	10	11	12	13	14	15	16	17	18	19	20	21	22	23	24	25	26	27	28	29	30	31	32
Stadium	H	A	H	A	H	A	H	A	A	H	A	H	A	H	A	A	H	A	H	A	H	H	A	A	H	A	H	A	H	A	H	H
Result	L	D	W	L	W	W	W	W	L																							

Source: Schedule
A = Away; H = Home; W = Win; D = Draw; L = Loss

==== Match results ====
Birmingham's schedule was announced on March 30 featuring 32 matches, 28 of which were contested against Central Division opponents.

May 1 1	Birmingham Legion	0–1	Indy Eleven	Birmingham, AL
6:30 PM CDT	Asiedu (yellow card) 61'; Williams (red card) 87'	Report	Arteaga 28'; Hamilton (yellow card) 90+5'	Stadium: BBVA Field; Attendance: 0 Referee: Greg Dopka

May 8 2	Louisville City	1–1	Birmingham Legion	Louisville, KY
6:30 PM CDT	McMahon 3' (yellow card) 58'; Hubbard (yellow card) 60'; DelPiccolo (yellow card) 60'; Souahy (yellow card) 74'; Gómez (yellow card) 90'	Report	Brett 60' (pen.)	Stadium: Lynn Family Stadium; Attendance: 7,652; Referee: Joshua Encarnación

May 15 3	Birmingham Legion	1–0	Memphis 901	Birmingham, AL
3:30 PM CDT	Asiedu (yellow card) 10'; Rufe (yellow card) 53'; Brett 60'	Report	Carroll (yellow card) 20'; Oduro (yellow card) 57'	Stadium: Legion Field; Attendance: 10,177; Referee: Kyle Johnston

May 22 4	San Antonio	2–1	Birmingham Legion	San Antonio, TX
7:30 PM CDT	Patiño 1' (yellow card) 18'; Varela (yellow card) 25'; Cuello (yellow card) 60'; Fogaça (yellow card) 74'; Lindley (yellow card) 81'; Perruzza 81'	Report	Kavita (yellow card) 18'; Brett 90+4'	Stadium: Toyota Field; Attendance: 3,845; Referee: Sergii Demianchuk

May 26 5	Birmingham Legion	1–0	OKC Energy	Birmingham, AL
7:00 PM CDT	Lapa 49'; Kleemann (yellow card) 51'	Report	Brown (yellow card) 18'	Stadium: BBVA Field; Attendance: ? Referee: Matthew Thompson

May 30 6	Atlanta United 2	0–1	Birmingham Legion	Kennesaw, GA
2:30 PM CDT	Mertz (yellow card) 49'; Allan (yellow card) 73'	Report	Herivaux (yellow card) 89'; Lapa 90+3' (pen.)	Stadium: Fifth Third Bank Stadium; Referee: Thomas Snyder

June 6 7	Birmingham Legion	2–1	FC Tulsa	Birmingham, AL
4:00 PM CDT	Brett 30', 75'; James (yellow card) 43'	Report	Folla (yellow card) 47'; Suarez 83'	Stadium: BBVA Field; Referee: Elvis Osmanovic

June 12 8	OKC Energy	1–2	Birmingham Legion	Oklahoma City, OK
7:30 PM CDT	Bijev (yellow card) 50', (goal) 73' (pen.)	Report	Brett 3'; Asiedu (yellow card) 37'; James (yellow card) 66'; Oekel (yellow card) 73'; Williams 83'	Stadium: Taft Stadium; Attendance: 2,049; Referee: Mark Allatin

June 16 9	Louisville City	2–0	Birmingham Legion	Louisville, KY
6:30 PM CDT	McCabe (yellow card) 24'; Lancaster 25' (pen.); Matsoso 48'	Report	A. Crognale (yellow card) 90'	Stadium: Lynn Family Stadium; Referee: Lukasz Szpala

June 19 10	Birmingham Legion	P–P	Austin Bold	Birmingham, AL
6:30 PM CDT				Stadium: BBVA Field; Referee: Jonathan Bilinski
Note: Match postponed due to inclement weather.

June 23 11	Miami FC	0–1	Birmingham Legion	Miami, FL
7:00 PM CDT	Ballard (yellow card) 19'; Akinyode (yellow card) 67'; Martínez (yellow card) 89'	Report	Williams (yellow card) 4'; A. Crognale (yellow card) 40'; Asiedu (yellow card) 70'; Herivaux (yellow card) 79'; Brett 82'; Lopez (yellow card) 89'	Stadium: FIU Soccer Stadium; Referee: John Griggs

June 30 12	Birmingham Legion	A–A	Atlanta United 2	Birmingham, AL
7:00 PM CDT	James (yellow card) 24'; Brett 41'	Report	McFadden 13'; Kamdem Fewo (yellow card) 19'; Washington (yellow card) 30'	Stadium: BBVA Field; Referee: Matthew Corrigan
Note: Match abandoned at half-time due to weather with score tied at 1–1

July 3 13	Indy Eleven	0–1	Birmingham Legion	Indianapolis, IN
7:00 PM CDT	Ouimette (yellow card) 7'; Ayoze (yellow card) 76'	Report	Brett 8' (pen.); Lapa (yellow card) 29'; Servania (yellow card) 65'	Stadium: Michael A. Carroll Stadium; Attendance: 6,999; Referee: Jervis Atagana

July 10 14	Birmingham Legion	0–1	Memphis 901 FC	Birmingham, AL
6:30 PM CDT	James (yellow card) 62'	Report	Salazar (yellow card) 27'; Oduro (yellow card) 45+2'; Murphy 53'	Stadium: BBVA Field; Referee: Joshua Encarnación

July 24 15	Indy Eleven	1–2	Birmingham Legion	Indianapolis, IN
6:00 PM CDT	Kavita 77' (o.g.)	Report	Servania (yellow card) 45+1'; Kasim 54'; A. Crognale (yellow card) 64'; Dean 90+1'	Stadium: Michael A. Carroll Stadium; Attendance: 5,999; Referee: Kevin Fikar

July 31 16	Birmingham Legion	2–2	Atlanta United 2	Birmingham, AL
8:00 PM	Lopez (yellow card) 52'; Brett 66' (pen.); Flemmings 69'; Dean (yellow card) 80'; A. Crognale (yellow card) 90+1'	Report	McFadden 35'; Fortune (yellow card) 56'; Kamdem Fewo (yellow card) 65'; Mertz (yellow card) 86'; Matheus 90+6'	Stadium: BBVA Field; Referee: John Matto

August 4 12	Birmingham Legion	3–1	Atlanta United 2	Birmingham, AL
8:00 PM	Williams 11'; Lopez 49'; Flemmings 51'; Dean (yellow card) 81'; E. Crognale (yellow card) 89'	Report	Goodrum 9'; McFadden (yellow card) 40'; Bauer (yellow card) 62'; Fortune (yellow card) 90+3'	Stadium: BBVA Field; Referee: Ben Meyer
Note: Re-schedule of abandoned June 30 match.

August 7 17	FC Tulsa	3–1	Birmingham Legion	Tulsa, OK
7:00 PM CDT	Jadama (yellow card) 71'; Sheldon 25'; Marlon 88', (yellow card) 89'; Kibato 90+1'; Ayagwa (yellow card) 80'	Report	Brett (yellow card) 45+1', (goal) 66' (pen.); Vancaeyezeele (yellow card) 77'; Rufe (yellow card) 84'	Stadium: ONEOK Field; Attendance: 3,389; Referee: Jeremy Scheer

August 11 18	Birmingham Legion	4–2	Sporting Kansas City II	Birmingham, AL
7:00 PM	Brett 7'; Williams 70'; Flemmings 81'; Asiedu 90+1'	Report	Čuić 4'; Duke (yellow card) 68'; Roberts 74'; Barbir (yellow card) 90+3'	Stadium: BBVA Field; Referee: John Griggs

August 14 19	Memphis 901 FC	1–1	Birmingham Legion	Birmingham, AL
7:30 PM CDT	Murphy 58'	Report	Flemmings 37'	Stadium: AutoZone Park; Attendance: 4,864; Referee: Gabriele Giusti

August 22 20	Birmingham Legion	1–2	FC Tulsa	Birmingham, AL
4:00 PM CDT	Flemmings 68'	Report	Johnson 8'; Suárez 56'	Stadium: BBVA Field; Referee: Sergii Demianchuk

August 28 21	Birmingham Legion	2–1	Louisville City FC	Birmingham, AL
6:30 PM CDT	Dean (yellow card) 16'; Lopez (yellow card) 44'; Brett 51'; Williams 78'	Report	Watts (yellow card) 50'; DelPiccolo 62'	Stadium: BBVA Field; Referee: Brad Jensen

September 1 22	Sporting Kansas City II	0–1	Birmingham Legion	Kansas City, KS
7:00 PM CDT		Report	Kasim 42'; Lopez (yellow card) 63'; Williams (yellow card) 69'	Stadium: Children's Mercy Park; Referee: Brandon Stevis

September 4 23	Memphis 901 FC	3–2	Birmingham Legion	Memphis, TN
7:00 PM CDT	Kissiedou 45+2'; Lamah 90+3'; Gonzalez 90+6'	Report	Kasim 42'; Vancaeyezeele (yellow card) 43'; Dean (yellow card) 70'; A. Crognale 79'; E. Crognale (yellow card) 83'; Lopez (yellow card) 87'	Stadium: AutoZone Park; Attendance: 3,162; Referee: Luis Guardia

September 11 24	FC Tulsa	1–1	Birmingham Legion	Tulsa, OK
7pm CDT	Da Costa (yellow card) 12'; Suárez 29' (pen.); Coutinho (yellow card) 88'	Report	Kasim (yellow card) 53'; Lopez (yellow card) 65'; Williams 80'	Stadium: ONEOK Field; Attendance: 3,439; Referee: Natalie Simon

September 18 25	Birmingham Legion	1–1	OKC Energy	Birmingham, AL
6:30 PM CDT	Flemmings (yellow card) 47'; Lopez 55'	Report	Kurimoto (yellow card) 35'; Bijev 39'; Batista (yellow card) 65'; Ellis-Hayden (yellow card) 81'	Stadium: BBVA Field; Referee: Matthew Franz

September 22 26	Atlanta United 2	0–4	Birmingham Legion	Kennesaw, GA
7:30 PM	Conway (yellow card) 47'; Matheus (yellow card) 56'; Kamdem Fewo (yellow card) 88'	Report	Vancaeyezeele 17'; Servania (yellow card) 71'; Brett 78', 90+3'; Kasim 82'	Stadium: Fifth Third Bank Stadium; Attendance: 717; Referee: Luis Arroyo

September 26 27	Birmingham Legion	2–1	Charlotte Independence	Birmingham, AL
4:00 PM CDT	Asiedu (yellow card) 21'; Brett 25'; Williams (yellow card) 41'; Lopez (yellow card) 66'; E. Crognale 70'; Herivaux (yellow card) 85'	Report	Fuchs 16'; Armour (yellow card) 82'	Stadium: BBVA Field; Referee: Gerald Flores

October 1 28	Sporting Kansas City II	0–1	Birmingham Legion	Kansas City, KS
7:00 PM CDT	Davis (yellow card) 56'	Report	A. Crognale 10'; Lopez (yellow card) 52'	Stadium: Children's Mercy Park; Referee: DeShun Beard

October 10 29	Birmingham Legion	3–1	Indy Eleven	Birmingham, AL
4:00 PM CDT	Brett 8'; Kavita (yellow card) 45'; Vancaeyezeele (yellow card) 54'; E. Crognale 74'; Rufe 90+4', (yellow card) 90+4'	Report	Law 42'	Stadium: BBVA Field; Referee: Sergii Demianchuk

October 13 10	Birmingham Legion	3–1	Austin Bold	Birmingham, AL
7:00 PM CDT	Taylor 15' (o.g.); Brett 75'; Lapa 82'; Kavita (yellow card) 90+3'	Report	Adaptation 23', (yellow card) 61'; Báez (yellow card) 26'; Rissi (yellow card) 88'; Guadarrama (yellow card) 90+3'	Stadium: BBVA Field; Referee: John Griggs
Note: Re-schedule of postponed June 19th match.

October 17 30	OKC Energy FC	0–0	Birmingham Legion	Oklahoma City, OK
5:00 PM CDT	Osmond (yellow card) 90+3'; Chavez (yellow card) 90+5'	Report	A. Crognale (yellow card) 52'; Asiedu (yellow card) 88'; Lopez (yellow card) 90+2'; Kavita (yellow card) 90+4'	Stadium: Taft Stadium; Attendance: 3,246; Referee: Jeremy Scheer

October 24 31	Birmingham Legion	6–0	Sporting Kansas City II	Birmingham, AL
4:00 PM	Herivaux 4', (yellow card) 63'; Lapa 18', 39'; Brett 31'; Kavita (yellow card) 40'; Asiedu (yellow card) 45'; Flemmings 70'; Kasim 76'	Report	Lenis (yellow card) 86'	Stadium: BBVA Field; Referee: Greg Dopka

October 30 32	Birmingham Legion	0–1	Louisville City FC	Birmingham, AL
6:30 PM CDT	Asiedu (yellow card) 34'; James (yellow card) 87'	Report	Jimenez (yellow card) 38'; Gomez (yellow card) 55'; Gonzalez (yellow card) 75'; Hoppenot 82'	Stadium: BBVA Field; Referee: Matthew Thompson

==== USL Cup Playoffs ====
November 7 Conf. QF	Birmingham Legion	w/o	Pittsburgh Riverhounds SC	Birmingham, AL
4:00 PM CST		Report		Stadium: BBVA Field
Note: Match canceled after multiple Pittsburgh Riverhounds SC players tested positive for COVID-19.

November 13 Conf. SF	Tampa Bay Rowdies	1–0	Birmingham Legion	St. Petersburg, FL
6:00 CST	Ekra 57'; Scarlett (yellow card) 90+4'	Report	A. Crognale (yellow card) 39'; Kasim (yellow card) 46'; E. Crognale (yellow card) 89'; Williams (yellow card) 90+3'	Stadium: Al Lang Stadium; Attendance: 5,949; Referee: Elton García

== Statistics ==
=== Appearances and goals ===
No.	Pos.	Name	USL		Total	
No.	Pos.	Name	Apps	Goals	Apps	Goals
1	GK	(United States) Matt Van Oekel	9	0	9	0
2	MF	(United States) Marcos Ugarte	1	0	1	0
3	DF	(Democratic Republic of the Congo) Phanuel Kavita	9	0	9	0
4	DF	(United States) Freddy Kleemann	2	0	2	0
5	MF	(United States) Mikey Lopez	4	0	4	0
6	MF	(Ghana) Anderson Asiedu	9	0	9	0
7	DF	(Canada) Ryan James	9	0	9	0
8	MF	(Brazil) Bruno Lapa	9	2	9	2
10	FW	(Ghana) Prosper Kasim	3	0	3	0
11	FW	(Jamaica) Neco Brett	9	6	9	6
12	MF	(United States) Eli Crognale	9	0	9	0
13	DF	(United States) Jake Rufe	3	0	3	0
16	MF	(Japan) Daigo Kobayashi	6	0	6	0
17	MF	(Puerto Rico) Jaden Servania	8	0	8	0
20	MF	(Haiti) Zachary Herivaux	6	0	6	0
21	DF	(United States) Alex Crognale	5	0	5	0
22	DF	(United States) Ben Ofeimu	7	0	7	0
23	FW	(United States) JJ Williams	8	1	8	1
24	DF	(United States) Jonathan Dean	8	0	8	0
77	FW	(Jamaica) Junior Flemmings	6	0	6	0

Source: Stats

=== Disciplinary record ===
No.	Pos.	Name	USL		Total	
No.	Pos.	Name	Yellow card	Red card	Yellow card	Red card
1	GK	(United States) Matt Van Oekel	1	0	1	0
3	DF	(Democratic Republic of the Congo) Phanuel Kavita	1	0	1	0
4	DF	(United States) Freddy Kleemann	1	0	1	0
6	MF	(Ghana) Anderson Asiedu	3	0	3	0
7	DF	(Canada) Ryan James	2	0	2	0
13	DF	(United States) Jake Rufe	1	0	1	0
20	MF	(Haiti) Zachary Herivaux	1	0	1	0
21	DF	(United States) Alex Crognale	1	0	1	0
23	FW	(United States) JJ Williams	0	1	0	1

Source: Stats

=== Clean sheets ===
No.	Name	USL	Total	Games Played		
No.	Name	0	(United States) Ford Parker	0	0	0
1	(United States) Matt Van Oekel	3	3	9		
18	(United States) Trevor Spangenberg	0	0	0		

Source: Stats

== See also ==
- Birmingham Legion FC
- 2021 in American soccer
- 2021 USL Championship season
