= 2022 USL Championship playoffs =

Tournament details
- Country: United States
- Teams: 14

Final positions
- Champions: San Antonio FC
- Runners-up: Louisville City FC

Tournament statistics
- Matches played: 13
- Goals scored: 38 (2.92 per match)
- Attendance: 104,695 (8,053 per match)
- Top goal scorer(s): (Colombia) Santiago Patiño (5 goals)
- All statistics correct as of November 13, 2022.

The 2022 USL Championship playoffs (branded as the 2022 USL Championship Playoffs presented by Hisense for sponsorship reasons) is the post-season championship of the 2022 USL Championship. It is the twelfth edition of the USL Championship playoffs. The playoffs began October 22, and concluded with the USL Championship Final on November 13.

San Antonio FC won the regular season. Defending title holders Orange County SC did not qualify for the playoffs.

== Format ==
The top seven teams in each conference qualify for the playoffs; the top team from each conference earned a bye to the conference semifinals. After the opening round the tournament will be reseeded to ensure that the top team from each conference plays the lowest seeded team and hosting rights will be determined by regular season record. All playoff matches will be streamed live on ESPN+ except the Championship final on ESPN2, ESPN Deportes, and SiriusXM FC.

== Conference standings ==
Eastern Conference

Pos	Team	Pld	Pts
1	Louisville City FC	34	72
2	Memphis 901 FC	34	68
3	Tampa Bay Rowdies	34	67
4	Birmingham Legion FC	34	58
5	Pittsburgh Riverhounds SC	34	57
6	Miami FC	34	55
7	Detroit City FC	34	54
8	FC Tulsa	34	42
9	Indy Eleven	34	41
10	Hartford Athletic	34	36
11	Loudoun United FC	34	28
12	Charleston Battery	34	25
13	Atlanta United 2	34	23
14	New York Red Bulls II	34	15

Source: USL Championship Standings

Western Conference

Pos	Team	Pld	Pts
1	San Antonio FC (C, X)	34	77
2	San Diego Loyal SC	34	60
3	Colorado Springs Switchbacks	34	55
4	Sacramento Republic	34	53
5	New Mexico United	34	51
6	Rio Grande Valley Toros	34	49
7	Oakland Roots SC	34	46
8	El Paso Locomotive FC	34	46
9	Las Vegas Lights FC	34	45
10	Phoenix Rising FC	34	42
11	LA Galaxy II	34	40
12	Monterey Bay FC	34	40
13	Orange County SC	34	34

Source: USL Championship Standings
(C) Champions; (X) Regular Season League Champion

== Bracket ==
Conference Quarterfinals; October 22–23	Conference Semifinals; October 28–30
E1	Louisville City FC (p)	2 (5)
E5	Pittsburgh Riverhounds SC	2 (3)
E4	Birmingham Legion FC	2 (7)
E5	Pittsburgh Riverhounds SC (p)	2 (8)
Eastern Conference
E2	Memphis 901 FC	3
E7	Detroit City FC	1
E2	Memphis 901 FC	0
E3	Tampa Bay Rowdies	1
E3	Tampa Bay Rowdies	3
E6	Miami FC	1
W1	San Antonio FC	3
W7	Oakland Roots SC	0
W2	San Diego Loyal SC	0
W7	Oakland Roots SC	3
Western Conference
W3	Colorado Springs Switchbacks FC	3
W6	Rio Grande Valley FC	0
W3	Colorado Springs Switchbacks FC (a.e.t.)	2
W4	Sacramento Republic FC	1
W4	Sacramento Republic FC	2
W5	New Mexico United	0

Conference Finals; November 5–6
E1	Louisville City FC (a.e.t.)	1
E3	Tampa Bay Rowdies	0
W1	San Antonio FC	2
W3	Colorado Springs Switchbacks FC	0

USL Championship Final; November 13
E1	Louisville City FC	1
W1	San Antonio FC	3

== Schedule ==
=== Conference Quarterfinals ===
October 22 East	Tampa Bay Rowdies	3–1	Miami FC	St. Petersburg, Florida
7:30 PM EDT	Antley (yellow card) 30'; Guenzatti 50', 70'; Law 59'	Report	Chapman-Page (yellow card) 39'; Rivas 55'; Ballard (yellow card) 84'	Stadium: Al Lang Stadium; Attendance: 5,937; Referee: Calin Radosav

October 22 East	Memphis 901 FC	3–1	Detroit City FC	Memphis, Tennessee
8:00 PM CDT	Buckmaster (yellow card) 51'; Allan 72'; Smith 88'; Goodrum 90+4' (yellow card) 90+5'	Report	Rodriguez (yellow card) 10'; Bryant (yellow card) 75'; Matthews 77'; Lewis (yellow card) 85'	Stadium: AutoZone Park; Attendance: 6,010; Referee: Elijio Arreguin

October 22 West	Colorado Springs Switchbacks FC	3–0	Rio Grande Valley FC	Colorado Springs, Colorado
6:30 PM MDT	Amoh (yellow card) 29'; Henríquez 84'; Wheeler 90', 90+4'	Report	Ricketts (yellow card) 23'	Stadium: Weidner Field; Attendance: 7,036; Referee: Mark Allatin

October 22 West	Sacramento Republic FC	2–0	New Mexico United	Sacramento, California
7:00 PM PDT	López (yellow card) 27'; Foster 47'; Keko 74'	Report	Yearwood (yellow card) 16'; Moreno (yellow card) 42'	Stadium: Heart Health Park; Attendance: 11,569; Referee: Elvis Osmanovic

October 23 East	Birmingham Legion FC	2–2 (a.e.t.) (7–8 p)	Pittsburgh Riverhounds SC	Birmingham, Alabama
6:00 PM EDT	Kasim 72'; Lapa 99' (yellow card) 100'	Report	Wiedt (yellow card) 57'; Kizza 90', 116' (yellow card) 120+9'	Stadium: Protective Stadium; Attendance: 10,227; Referee: Eric Tattersall
	Penalties
	Crognale (penalty missed); Lapa (penalty missed); Dean (penalty scored); James (penalty scored); Martinez (penalty scored); Balarabe (penalty scored); Rufe (penalty scored); Lopez (penalty scored); Kavita (penalty scored); Dupont (penalty missed)		(penalty scored) Sims; (penalty scored) Griffin; (penalty scored) Dikwa; (penalty missed) Cicerone; (penalty missed) Eyang; (penalty scored) Ybarra; (penalty scored) Ordoñez; (penalty scored) Kelly; (penalty scored) Peters; (penalty scored) Kizza

October 23 West	San Diego Loyal SC	0–3	Oakland Roots SC	San Diego, California
5:30 PM PDT	Guido (yellow card) 6' (yellow-red card) 79'; Amang (yellow card) 76' (yellow-red card) 76'; Stoneman (yellow card) 84' (yellow-red card) 88'; Fissore (yellow card) 86'	Report	Nane (yellow card) 15'; Martin (yellow card) 26'; Dennis 36'; Mfeka 53'; Hernández (yellow card) 76'; Barbir (yellow card) 78'; Fissore 90+1'; Klimenta (yellow card) 87'	Stadium: Torero Stadium; Attendance: 5,719; Referee: Elton Garcia

=== Conference Semifinals ===
October 28 West	San Antonio FC	3–0	Oakland Roots SC	San Antonio, Texas
7:30 PM CDT	Adeniran 2'; Khmiri (yellow card) 20'; Garcia (yellow card) 56'; Patiño 75', 90'	Report	Barbir (yellow card) 52'; Rodriguez (yellow card) 76'; Rito (yellow card) 89'; Hernández (yellow card) 89'	Stadium: Toyota Field; Attendance: 8,208; Referee: Elvis Osmanovic

October 29 East	Louisville City FC	2–2 (a.e.t.) (5–3 p)	Pittsburgh Riverhounds SC	Louisville, Kentucky
7:30 PM EDT	Wynder (yellow card) 62'; Perez 83' (yellow card) 88'; Lancaster 85' (pen.); Dia (yellow card) 115'	Report	Cicerone 14', 47' (yellow card) 103'; Rovira (yellow card) 45+2'; Williams (yellow card) 54'; Wiedt (yellow card) 84'; Dikwa (yellow card) 90+4'	Stadium: Lynn Family Stadium; Attendance: 8,509; Referee: Elijio Arreguin
	Penalties
	Totsch (penalty scored); Wynder (penalty scored); Jimenez (penalty scored); Matsoso (penalty scored); Moguel (penalty scored)		(penalty missed) Griffin; (penalty scored) Forbes; (penalty scored) Sims; (penalty scored) Dikwa

October 29 West	Colorado Springs Switchbacks FC	2–1 (a.e.t.)	Sacramento Republic FC	Colorado Springs, Colorado
6:00 PM MDT	Ngalina 37', 96'; Wheeler (yellow card) 106'; Caldwell (yellow card) 114'; Anderson (yellow card) 120+2'	Report	Lopez 18'; LaGrassa (yellow card) 39'; Gurr (yellow card) 45+2'; Casey (yellow card) 65'; Martínez (yellow card) 66'; Archimède (yellow card) 120+2'	Stadium: Weidner Field; Attendance: 7,075; Referee: Sergii Demianchuk

October 30 East	Memphis 901 FC	0–1	Tampa Bay Rowdies	Memphis, Tennessee
3:00 PM CDT	Goodrum (yellow card) 51'; Kiddiedou (yellow card) 90+7'; Paul (yellow card) 90+10'	Report	Guillén (yellow card) 29'; Dalgaard (yellow card) 74'; Guenzatti (yellow card) 80'; Scarlett (yellow card) 90+3'; Hilton (yellow card) 90+8'; Fernandes 90+9' (pen.)	Stadium: AutoZone Park; Attendance: 6,063; Referee: Elton Garcia
Note: Match rescheduled from October 29 due to weather.

=== Conference Finals ===
November 5 East	Louisville City FC	1–0 (a.e.t.)	Tampa Bay Rowdies	Louisville, Kentucky
7:30 PM EDT	Totsch (yellow card) 48'; Bone (red card) 82'; Charpie (yellow card) 100'; Wynder 108'	Report	Hilton (yellow card) 84'; Harris (yellow card) 90+3'; Dos Santos (yellow card) 106'	Stadium: Lynn Family Stadium; Attendance: 11,563; Referee: Mark Allatin

November 6 West	San Antonio FC	2–0	Colorado Springs Switchbacks FC	San Antonio, Texas
7:30 PM CST	Maloney 23'; Parano (yellow card) 66'; Adeniran (yellow card) 75'; Patiño (yellow card) 90+2' (goal) 90+11'	Report	Ngalina (yellow card) 10'; Hodge (yellow card) 49'; Henriquez (yellow card) 54'; Wheeler (yellow card) 78'; Herrera (yellow card) 87'; Mahoney (yellow card) 89'	Stadium: Toyota Field; Attendance: 8,245; Referee: Kevin Broadley

=== USL Championship Final ===
Similar to the 2022 MLS playoffs, the final featured the top seeds in the Eastern and Western Conferences, Louisville City FC and San Antonio FC, who were their conferences' regular-season and play-off champions. As overall regular-season champion, San Antonio FC had home-field advantage for the final.

For Louisville City, 2022 marks the fourth Championship final in five seasons, having won two of their previous three in 2017 and 2018. For San Antonio FC, this is a first USL Championship final.

November 13	San Antonio FC	3–1	Louisville City FC	San Antonio, Texas
7:30 PM CST	Patiño 45+3' (pen.), 70'; Garcia (yellow card) 47'; Delem (yellow card) 62'; Adeniran 64'	Report	Lancaster (yellow card) 44'; Faundez (yellow card) 61'; Ownby 78'; Mushagalusa (yellow card) 80'	Stadium: Toyota Field; Attendance: 8,534; Referee: Lukasz Szpala

Championship Game MVP: (Colombia) Santiago Patiño (SAN)

== Top goalscorers ==
Rank	Player	Club	Goals
1	(Colombia) Santiago Patiño	San Antonio FC	5
2	(United States) Samuel Adeniran	San Antonio FC	2
2	(United States) Russell Cicerone	Pittsburgh Riverhounds SC	2
2	(Uruguay) Sebastián Guenzatti	Tampa Bay Rowdies	2
2	(Uganda) Edward Kizza	Pittsburgh Riverhounds SC	2
2	(Democratic Republic of the Congo) Michee Ngalina	Colorado Springs Switchbacks	2
2	(United States) Aaron Wheeler	Colorado Springs Switchbacks	2

== Awards ==
- Goal of the Playoffs: (England) Charlie Dennis (OAK)
- Save of the Playoffs: (United States) Jordan Farr (SAN)
