= Gabriel Alves =

Brazilian footballer (born 2000)

Personal information
- Full name: Gabriel Alcides Alves
- Date of birth: 10 February 2000 (age 26)
- Place of birth: São Paulo, Brazil
- Height: 6 ft 1 in (1.85 m)
- Positions: Defender; midfielder

Team information
- Current team: Brooklyn FC
- Number: 3

College career
Years	Team	Apps	(Gls)
2020–2022	Marshall Thundering Herd	52	(2)

Senior career*
Years	Team	Apps	(Gls)
2022	Tormenta FC 2	0	(0)
2023	Birmingham Legion	13	(2)
2024	Rhode Island FC	16	(0)
2025	Tormenta FC	29	(1)
2026–	Brooklyn FC	28	(0)
- * Club domestic league appearances and goals as of 1 November 2026

Gabriel Alcides Alves (born 10 February 2000) is a Brazilian professional footballer who plays as a defender and midfielder who plays for USL Championship club Brooklyn FC.

== College career ==
Born in São Paulo, Brazil, Alves moved to the United States and played college soccer for Marshall University from 2020 until 2022. He made a total of 52 appearances and scored two goals over three seasons for the Thundering Herd, being a part of the team that won both the 2020 Conference USA Regular Season and the 2020 NCAA College Cup, with the latter trophy being Marshall's first-ever men's soccer national title, as well as Conference USA's first-ever national championship in any team sport. In the same year, he was named to the Conference USA's All-Conference Freshman Team.

Having captained the Herd throughout the 2022 season, the team's first campaign in the Sun Belt Conference, Alves was invited to the 2023 MLS Showcase.

== Club career ==
=== Birmingham Legion ===
On 26 January 2023, Alves signed his first professional contract with Birmingham Legion in the USL Championship.

On 11 March, he made his professional debut, being subbed on for Diba Nwegbo in the 77th minute of the Legion's season opener against the Pittsburgh Riverhounds, which ended in a 1–1 draw. He then scored his first professional goal on 25 March, giving the club a 1–0 league win over Hartford Athletic.

=== Rhode Island FC ===
On 11 December 2023, Alves signed with Rhode Island FC ahead of their inaugural USL Championship season. He was released by Rhode Island following the 2024 season.

=== Tormenta FC ===
Alves signed for USL League One side Tormenta FC on 8 January 2025.

== Honours ==
Marshall Thundering Herd

- Conference USA regular season: 2020
- NCAA National Championship: 2020

=== Individual ===
- Conference USA All-Conference Freshman Team: 2020
