= Samuel Shashoua =

English footballer (born 1999)

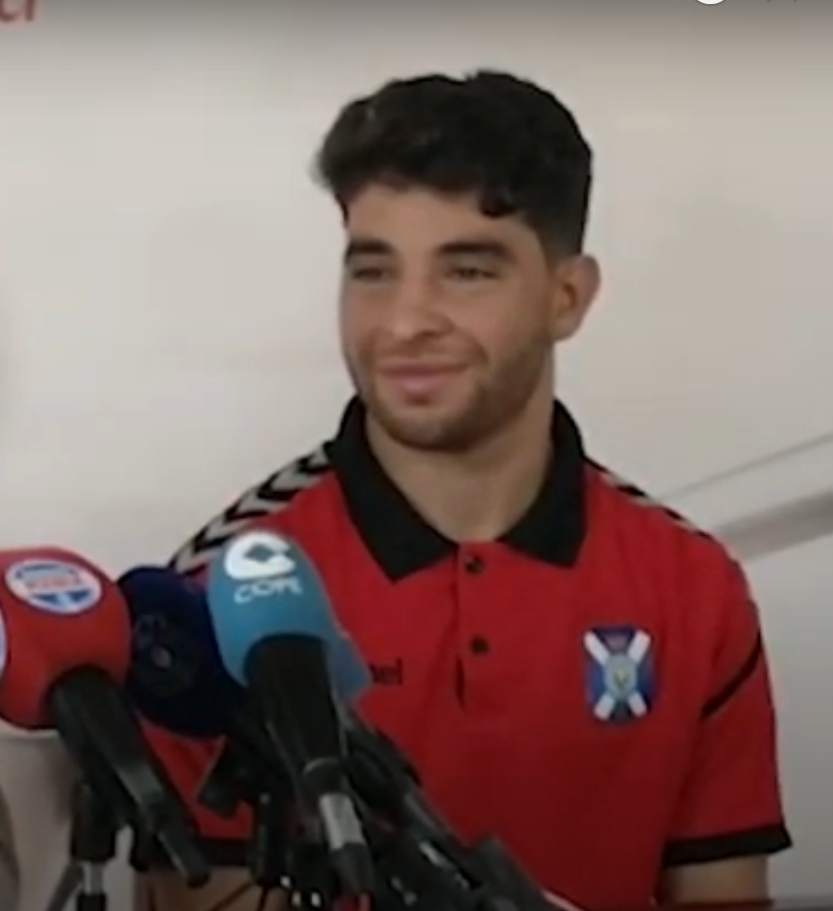
- Shashoua with Tenerife in 2019

Personal information
- Full name: Samuel Shashoua
- Date of birth: 13 May 1999 (age 27)
- Place of birth: Chelsea, London, England
- Height: 1.70 m (5 ft 7 in)
- Position: Attacking midfielder

Team information
- Current team: Birmingham Legion
- Number: 14

Youth career
- 2015–2018: Tottenham Hotspur

Senior career*
Years	Team	Apps	(Gls)
2018–2019	Tottenham Hotspur	0	(0)
2018–2019	→ Atlético Baleares (loan)	38	(6)
2019–2023	Tenerife	78	(10)
2020	→ Atlético Baleares (loan)	5	(0)
2023–2024	Albacete	17	(0)
2024–2025	Minnesota United	8	(0)
2024–2025	→ Minnesota United 2 (loan)	5	(3)
2025	→ Birmingham Legion (loan)	8	(0)
2026–	Birmingham Legion	24	(2)

International career
2015–2016	England U17	13	(4)
2017	England U18	3	(0)
- * Club domestic league appearances and goals as of 23:41, 3 November 2026 (UTC)

Samuel Shashoua (born 13 May 1999) is an English professional footballer who plays as an attacking midfielder for USL Championship club Birmingham Legion.

== Club career ==
Shashoua was born in Chelsea, London. There he attended Harrow School before signing with Tottenham Hotspur in 2015. On 26 August 2018, he moved to Spanish Segunda División B side CD Atlético Baleares on a one-year loan deal.

Shashoua made his senior debut on 9 September 2018, playing the last 18 minutes of a 2–1 away loss against SD Ejea. He scored his first goal late in the month by netting the opener in a 2–1 home defeat of UB Conquense, and finished the campaign with six goals in 33 appearances as his side missed out promotion in the play-offs.

On 23 August 2019, Shashoua was sold to CD Tenerife in Segunda División, and signed a three-year contract with the club. The following 14 January, after failing to make an appearance due to an injury, Shashoua was again loaned to Atlético Baleares for the remainder of the season. He only recovered in March, and played in three matches for ATB as the club missed out promotion in the play-offs for a second consecutive year.

Shashoua made his professional debut on 19 September 2020, replacing Bruno Wilson late into a 0–2 away loss against AD Alcorcón. On 29 November, again from the bench, he scored his first goal in a 2–0 win at Albacete Balompié.

Shashoua spent most of the 2022–23 season struggling with injuries, and left the club in June 2023 after his contract expired. On 24 July, he signed a two-year deal with Albacete also in the second division.

On 5 June 2024, Shashoua joined Major League Soccer side Minnesota United on a six-month deal until the end of the season. Shashoua was loaned to second-tier USL Championship side Birmingham Legion FC on 19 July 2025. He was released by Minnesota following the 2025 season.

On 24 December 2025, Birmingham Legion FC announced that they had signed Shashoua to a new contract.

== Personal life ==
Born in England, Shashoua is of Venezuelan, Spanish and Iraqi-Jewish descent. His mother is half-Spanish. Shashoua said that he would apply for a Spanish passport at the end of the 2020–21 season.

Shashoua's younger brother Armando is also a footballer and a midfielder; both played together for Atlético Baleares in 2020.

== Career statistics ==
=== Club ===
As of match played 10 October 2025

Appearances and goals by club, season and competition
Club	Season	League			National cup (Note: Includes Copa del Rey and U.S. Open Cup)		Continental		Other		Total	
Club	Season	Division	Apps	Goals	Apps	Goals	Apps	Goals	Apps	Goals	Apps	Goals
Tottenham Hotspur	2016–17	Premier League	0	0	—		—		—		0	0
Tottenham Hotspur	2017–18	Premier League	0	0	0	0	0	0	0	0	0	0
Tottenham Hotspur	Total		0	0	0	0	0	0	0	0	0	0
Tottenham Hotspur U21	2017–18	—			—		—		3 (Note: Appearance(s) in EFL Trophy)	1	3	1
Atlético Baleares (loan)	2018–19	Segunda División B	38	6	—		—		—		38	6
Tenerife	2019–20	Segunda División	0	0	0	0	—		—		0	0
Tenerife	2020–21	Segunda División	33	3	1	1	—		—		34	4
Tenerife	2021–22	Segunda División	33	6	1	0	—		—		34	6
Tenerife	2022–23	Segunda División	13	1	1	0	—		—		14	1
Tenerife	Total		79	10	3	1	—		—		82	11
Atlético Baleares (loan)	2019–20	Segunda División B	3	0	—		—		—		3	0
Albacete	2023–24	Segunda División	17	0	1	0	—		—		18	0
Minnesota United	2024	Major League Soccer	3	0	—		—		1 (Note: Appearance in Leagues Cup)	0	4	0
Minnesota United	2025	Major League Soccer	5	0	1	0	—		—		6	0
Minnesota United	Total		8	0	—		—		—		10	0
Minnesota United 2 (loan)	2024	MLS Next Pro	3	2	—		—		—		3	2
Minnesota United 2 (loan)	2025	MLS Next Pro	2	1	—		—		—		2	1
Minnesota United 2 (loan)	Total		5	3	—		—		—		5	3
Birmingham Legion FC (loan)	2025	USL Championship	8	0	—		—		2 (Note: Appearances in USL Cup)	0	10	0
Birmingham Legion FC	2026	USL Championship	0	0	0	0	—		0	0	0	0
Birmingham Legion FC	Total		8	0	0	0	—		2	0	10	0
Career Total			143	18	4	1	1	0	3	1	151	20
