= Moses Mensah (footballer, born 1998) =

Ghanaian footballer (born 1998)

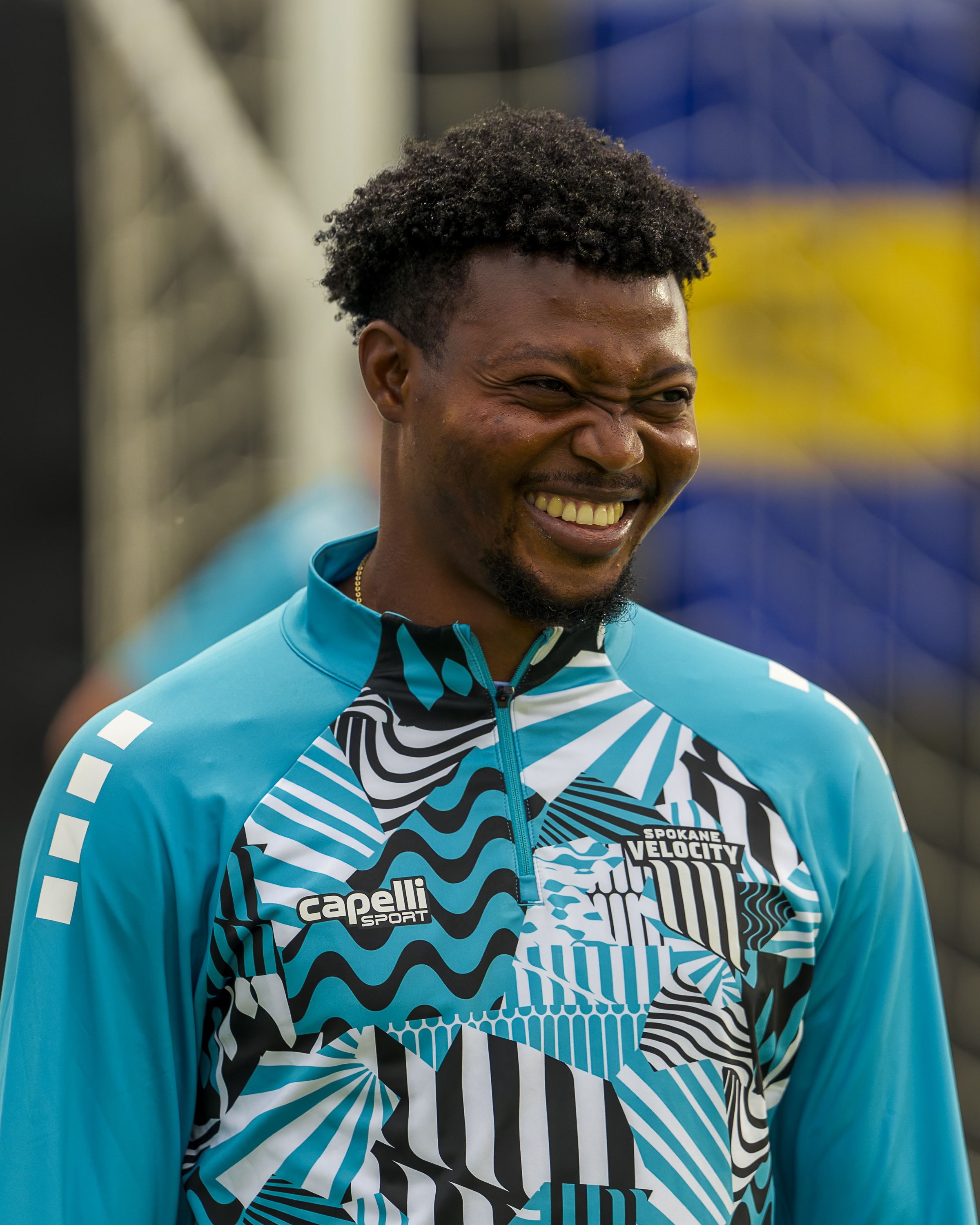
- Mensha with Spokane Velocity in 2026

Personal information
- Full name: Moses Nyarko-Fenyi Mensah
- Date of birth: 15 August 1998 (age 28)
- Place of birth: Cape Coast, Ghana
- Height: 1.88 m (6 ft 2 in)
- Position: Left back

Team information
- Current team: Spokane Velocity
- Number: 33

Youth career
- Wa All Stars

College career
Years	Team	Apps	(Gls)
2019–2022	Campbell Fighting Camels	73	(1)

Senior career*
Years	Team	Apps	(Gls)
2015–2018	Wa All Stars		
2021	Des Moines Menace	8	(0)
2022	One Knoxville	5	(0)
2023–2025	Birmingham Legion	73	(0)
2026–	Spokane Velocity	29	(0)

International career
- Ghana U18
- * Club domestic league appearances and goals as of 31 October 2026

Moses Mensah (born 15 August 1998) is a Ghanaian footballer who plays as a left back for USL League One side Spokane Velocity.

== Career ==
=== Early career ===
Mensah played with Ghana Premier League side WA All Stars, helping the team win the league title in the 2016 season. In 2019, he attended Campbell University in North Carolina to play college soccer. In four seasons with the Fighting Camels, Mensah made 73 appearances, scoring one goal and tallying 13 assists. During his time at Campbell, Mensah was Big South Freshman Player of the Year and was named to the All-Conference First Team four years in a row. Mensah was also the first Campbell player in the university's 60-year history to be named to the All-South Region teams four times.

While at college, Mensah also appeared in the USL League Two with Des Moines Menace in 2021, where he made nine appearances on the way to winning the USL League Two title. In 2022, he moved to One Knoxville during their inaugural season.

Following college, Mensah entered the 2023 MLS SuperDraft and was selected 74th overall by Real Salt Lake.

=== Birmingham Legion ===
On 8 February 2023, Mensah signed with USL Championship side Birmingham Legion. He was released by Birmingham following their 2025 season.

=== Spokane Velocity ===
On 10 March 2026, Mensah joined USL League One side Spokane Velocity.

== Honors ==
Des Moines Menace

- USL League Two: 2021
