= Diba Nwegbo =

Nigerian footballer

Personal information
- Full name: Patrick Nwegbo
- Date of birth: 1 January 2002 (age 24)
- Place of birth: Acworth, Georgia, United States
- Height: 1.80 m (5 ft 11 in)
- Positions: Winger; forward

Youth career
- 2017–2018: Smyrna Soccer Club
- 2018–2019: Alabama FC

College career
Years	Team	Apps	(Gls)
2019–2022	William & Mary Tribe	57	(9)

Senior career*
Years	Team	Apps	(Gls)
2021	Southern Soccer Academy Kings	9	(0)
2022	Vermont Green	10	(9)
2023–2024	Birmingham Legion	54	(5)

International career
2018–2019	Nigeria U17		
- * Club domestic league appearances and goals as of October 27, 2024

Patrick "Diba" Nwegbo (born 1 January 2002) is a footballer who plays as a forward. Born in the United States, he has represented Nigeria at youth level.

== Career ==
=== Youth and college ===
Nwegbo was born in the Acworth, Georgia to Nigerian parents. He attended North Cobb High School, where he was named to the Region 3-AAAAA Team of the Year in 2018 after scoring 21 goals and tallying six assists, making him the top goal scorer in the region. He also played club soccer with Smyrna Soccer Club between 2017 and 2018, then Alabama FC in 2018 to 2019. Nwegbo was invited to 2018 ECNL National Training Camp as well as with receiving a call up to the Nigeria national under-17 football team.

In 2019, Nwegbo attended the College of William & Mary to play college soccer. In four seasons with the Tribe, Nwegbo made 57 appearances, scoring nine goals and adding 17 assists. In 2021, he was named Second Team All-CAA and Second Team VaSID All-State.

While at college, Nwegbo competed in the USL League Two. He spent 2021 with Southern Soccer Academy Kings, and 2022 with Vermont Green, where he scored nine goals in 12 appearances.

Following college, Nwegbo entered the 2023 MLS SuperDraft, but went undrafted.

=== Birmingham Legion ===
On 9 March 2023, Nwegbo signed with USL Championship side Birmingham Legion. He made his professional debut on 11 March 2023, starting in a 1–1 draw with Pittsburgh Riverhounds. He left Birmingham following their 2024 season.
