= Alex Crognale =

American soccer player (born 1994)

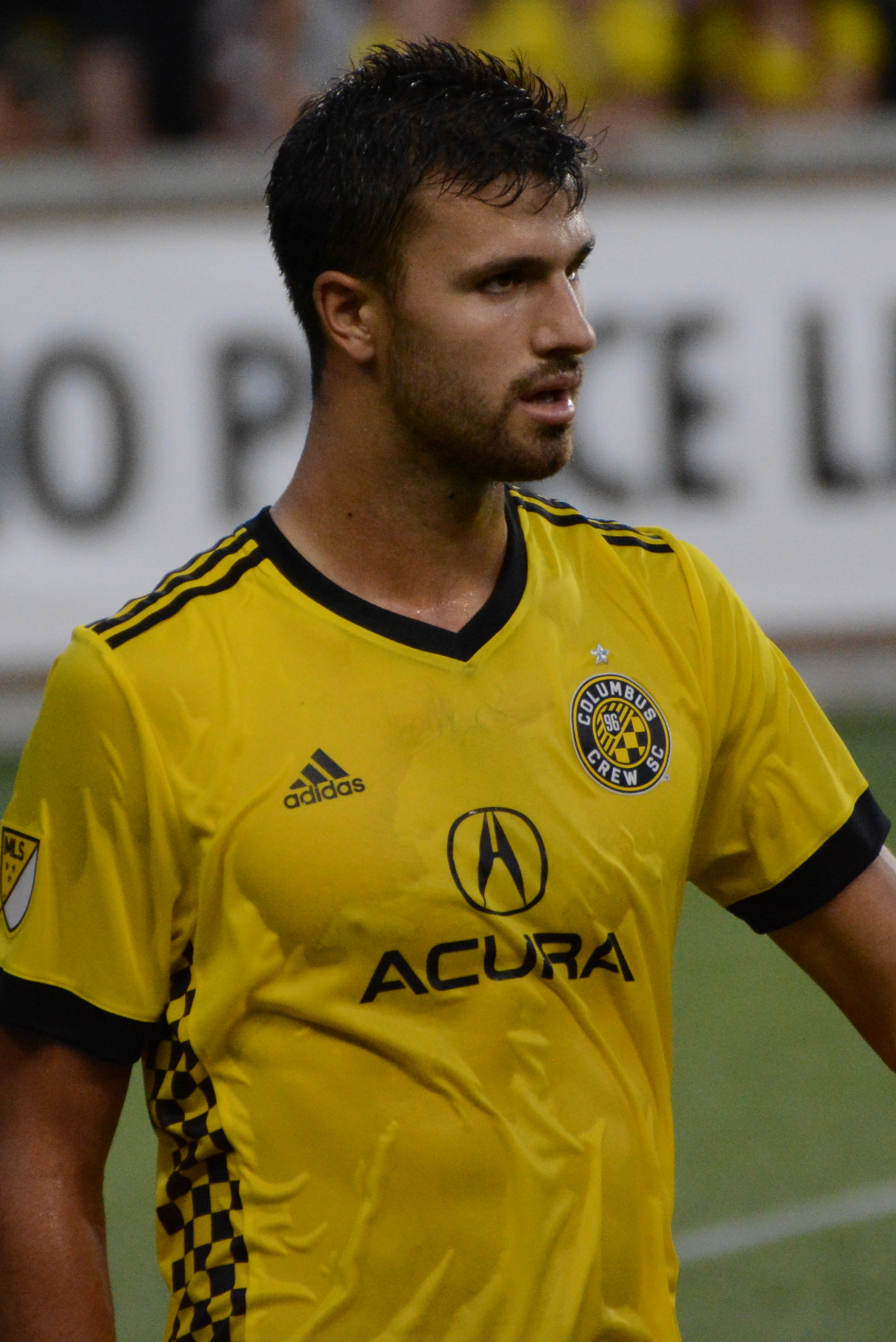
- Crognale in 2017

Personal information
- Full name: Alexander Crognale
- Date of birth: August 27, 1994 (age 32)
- Place of birth: Columbus, Ohio, United States
- Height: 6 ft 5 in (1.96 m)
- Position: Defender

Team information
- Current team: San Antonio FC
- Number: 21

Youth career
- 2010–2013: Columbus Crew SC

College career
Years	Team	Apps	(Gls)
2013–2016	Maryland Terrapins	73	(11)

Senior career*
Years	Team	Apps	(Gls)
2017–2019	Columbus Crew SC	34	(1)
2018	→ Orange County SC (loan)	23	(4)
2019	→ Indy Eleven (loan)	6	(0)
2020–2024	Birmingham Legion	135	(11)
2025–	San Antonio FC	46	(6)
- * Club domestic league appearances and goals as of November 10, 2026

Alex Crognale (born August 27, 1994) is an American professional soccer player who plays as a defender for USL Championship club San Antonio FC.

== Career ==
=== Youth and college ===
Born in Columbus, Ohio, Crognale is a product of the youth academy of Columbus Crew SC, before playing four years of college soccer at the University of Maryland between 2013 and 2016. In 2016, Crognale captained the Terrapins to a third straight Big Ten tourney title, and was named Big Ten Defensive Player of the Year. He was also chosen for the First-Team All-American in 2016

=== Columbus Crew SC ===
On December 13, 2016, it was announced that Crognale had signed a homegrown contract with Columbus Crew SC of Major League Soccer.

He made his professional debut on March 18, 2017, against D.C. United.

=== Orange County SC ===
On March 15, 2018, Crognale joined Orange County SC on loan from Columbus Crew SC on a game-by-game basis. He made his debut on March 17, 2018, in a 1–1 draw against Phoenix Rising FC, coming on as a substitute and scoring the equalizing goal in the 90th minute.

=== Indy Eleven ===
On March 15, 2019, Crognale joined Indy Eleven on loan from Columbus Crew SC.

=== Birmingham Legion ===
On December 23, 2019, Crognale signed a multi-year contract with Birmingham Legion FC. On October 21, 2020, Crognale was named Legion FC Defensive Player of the Year for the 2020 season. Crognale led the team in minutes, clearances and blocks, and started every match of the season for Birmingham in 2020. Crognale left Birmingham following their 2024 season.

=== San Antonio FC ===
Crognale joined San Antonio FC on December 30, 2024.

== Personal life ==
Crognale was born in the United States, and is of Italian descent.

Alex is the brother of fellow professional soccer player Eli Crognale, who also played for Birmingham Legion.

== Career statistics ==
As of 10 June 2022

Club	Season	League			Playoffs		Cup		Continental		Total	
Club	Season	Division	Apps	Goals	Apps	Goals	Apps	Goals	Apps	Goals	Apps	Goals
Columbus Crew SC	2017	MLS	17	0	0	0	1	0	–		18	0
Columbus Crew SC	2018	MLS	5	1	0	0	1	0	–		6	1
Columbus Crew SC	2019	MLS	12	0	–		2	0	–		14	0
Columbus Crew SC	Total		34	1	0	0	4	0	0	0	38	1
Orange County SC (loan)	2018	USL	23	4	3	0	0	0	–		26	4
Indy Eleven (loan)	2019	USL Championship	6	0	0	0	0	0	–		6	0
Birmingham Legion	2020	USL Championship	16	3	1	0	0	0	–		17	3
Birmingham Legion	2021	USL Championship	26	2	1	0	0	0	–		27	2
Birmingham Legion	2022	USL Championship	12	0	0	0	2	0	–		14	0
Birmingham Legion	Total		54	5	2	0	2	0	0	0	58	5
Total			117	10	5	0	6	0	0	0	128	10
