= Matt Van Oekel =

American soccer player (born 1986)

Personal information
- Full name: James Matthew Van Oekel
- Date of birth: September 20, 1986 (age 40)
- Place of birth: Chesapeake, Virginia, United States
- Height: 6 ft 4 in (1.93 m)
- Position: Goalkeeper

College career
Years	Team	Apps	(Gls)
2004	Longwood Lancers	17	(0)
2005–2007	Rutgers Scarlet Knights	47	(0)

Senior career*
Years	Team	Apps	(Gls)
2008–2009	Minnesota Thunder	1	(0)
2010–2014	Minnesota United	71	(0)
2015–2016	FC Edmonton	54	(0)
2017	Real Salt Lake	7	(0)
2017	→ Real Monarchs (loan)	1	(0)
2018	Oklahoma City Energy	18	(0)
2019–2025	Birmingham Legion	150	(0)
- * Club domestic league appearances and goals as of October 26, 2025

James Matthew "Matt" Van Oekel (born September 20, 1986) is an American professional soccer player who plays as a goalkeeper.

== Career ==
=== Youth and college ===
Van Oekel played one year of college soccer at Longwood University before transferring to Rutgers in his sophomore year. With Rutgers, he played in 47 games and earned 20 wins.

=== Professional ===
Van Oekel signed with Minnesota out of college in 2008, after impressing staff at the Thunder combine in February 2008.

He made his professional debut on September 13, 2009, in 1–1 draw with Montreal Impact, and was released at the end of the season when the Thunder failed, before being picked up by their successor NSC Minnesota Stars, in April 2010.

Minnesota United FC, now playing in the North American Soccer League, re-signed Van Oekel for the 2011 season on March 11, 2011. Minnesota announced in December 2011 that Van Oekel would return for the 2012 season.

Van Oekel signed with Major League Soccer side Real Salt Lake on December 22, 2016. On March 25, 2017, Van Oekel made his first MLS start with RSL, tallying three saves against New York Red Bulls.

Van Oekel signed with USL side Oklahoma City Energy FC on January 5, 2018.

Van Oekel was acquired by Birmingham Legion FC on December 12, 2018. He was released by Birmingham following their 2025 season.
