= Stefano Pinho =

Brazilian footballer (born 1991)

Stéfano Pinho
Personal information
- Full name: Stéfano Souza Pinho
- Date of birth: 12 January 1991 (age 35)
- Place of birth: São João Nepomuceno, Brazil
- Height: 1.84 m (6 ft 1/2 in)
- Position: Forward

Youth career
- 2004-2008: Friburguense
- 2008–2012: Fluminense

Senior career*
Years	Team	Apps	(Gls)
2012–2015	Fluminense	0	(0)
2012	→ Guaratinguetá (loan)	8	(0)
2013	→ Madureira (loan)	6	(1)
2014	→ MyPa (loan)	25	(11)
2015	→ Fort Lauderdale Strikers (loan)	29	(16)
2016	Minnesota United	25	(5)
2017	Miami FC	31	(21)
2018	Orlando City	25	(3)
2019	Xinjiang Tianshan Leopard	21	(10)
2020–2021	Al-Washm	11	(8)
2021	Austin Bold	25	(1)
2022	Indy Eleven	32	(13)
2023	Paysandu	4	(1)
2023	Indy Eleven	18	(0)
2024	Birmingham Legion	30	(14)
2025	Aparecidense	15	(2)
2025	Union Omaha	17	(3)
2026	Nacional	0	(0)
- * Club domestic league appearances and goals as of 21:59, 13 June 2026 (UTC)

Stéfano Souza Pinho (born 12 January 1991) is a Brazilian professional footballer who plays as a forward.

== Club career ==
Pinho was top scorer at the 2013 MLS Combine. He was drafted in round two of the 2013 MLS Supplemental Draft by Colorado Rapids but was not signed by the club.

In 2014, Pinho joined MyPa of the Finnish top flight on loan from Fluminense FC.

On 17 March 2015, Fort Lauderdale Strikers of the North American Soccer League announced that Pinho had joined the club for the 2015 season on loan from Fluminense FC, along with teammate Marlon Freitas and Corinthians defender PC. During the 2015 season, Pinho helped Fort Lauderdale reach the NASL Championship semi finals and won the NASL Golden Ball award for being the league MVP and Golden Boot as top scorer.

On 3 December 2015, it was announced that Pinho signed with Minnesota United FC for the 2016 NASL season.

In 2017 Pinho spent a third successive season in NASL, again with a different team. This time he guided Miami FC to a Spring season and Fall season championship double and once again collected the NASL Golden Ball and Golden Boot awards.

Pinho signed with Orlando City SC of MLS on 18 December 2017. He made his debut as a substitute at home to D.C. United in the season opener on 3 March 2018 and scored a stoppage time equalizer. After one season with the club, Pinho was waived by Orlando on 16 January 2019.

On 22 January 2019, he signed with Thai League 1 side PT Prachuap. On 1 March 2019, Pinho transferred to the China League One side Xinjiang Tianshan Leopard.

On 26 February 2021, Pinho joined USL Championship side Austin Bold FC.

Pinho moved to USL Championship side Indy Eleven on 31 January 2022.

On 30 November 2023, Indy Eleven announced Pinho's departure upon the expiration of his contract. On 6 February 2024, Pinho signed with Birmingham Legion for their upcoming 2024 season. He left Birmingham following their 2024 season.

In July 2025, Pinho joined USL League One reigning champions Union Omaha following a short spell back in his native Brazil with Aparecidense.

== Career statistics ==
=== Club ===
As of 3 November 2019

Club	Season	League			Cup		League Cup		Continental		Total	
Club	Season	Division	Apps	Goals	Apps	Goals	Apps	Goals	Apps	Goals	Apps	Goals
Fluminense	2012	Série A	0	0	0	0	–		0	0	0	0
Guaratinguetá (loan)	2012	Série B	8	0	0	0	–		–		8	0
MyPa (loan)	2014	Veikkausliiga	21	7	1	2	3	2	0	0	25	11
Club	Season	League			Cup		Playoffs		Continental		Total	
Club	Season	Division	Apps	Goals	Apps	Goals	Apps	Goals	Apps	Goals	Apps	Goals
Fort Lauderdale (loan)	2015	NASL	27	16	0	0	1	0	–		27	16
Minnesota United	2016	NASL	25	5	2	0	–		–		27	5
Miami FC	2017	NASL	27	17	3	4	1	0	–		31	21
Orlando City	2018	MLS	23	2	3	1	–		–		26	3
Xinjiang Tianshan Leopard	2019	CLO	21	10	0	0	–		–		21	10
Career totals			152	57	10	8	5	2	0	0	167	67

== Personal ==
Pinho holds a U.S. green card which qualifies him as a domestic player for MLS roster purposes.

== Honours ==
=== Individual ===
- NASL MVP (2) : 2015, 2017
- NASL Golden Boot (2): 2015, 2017
