= Neco Brett =

Jamaican footballer (born 1992)

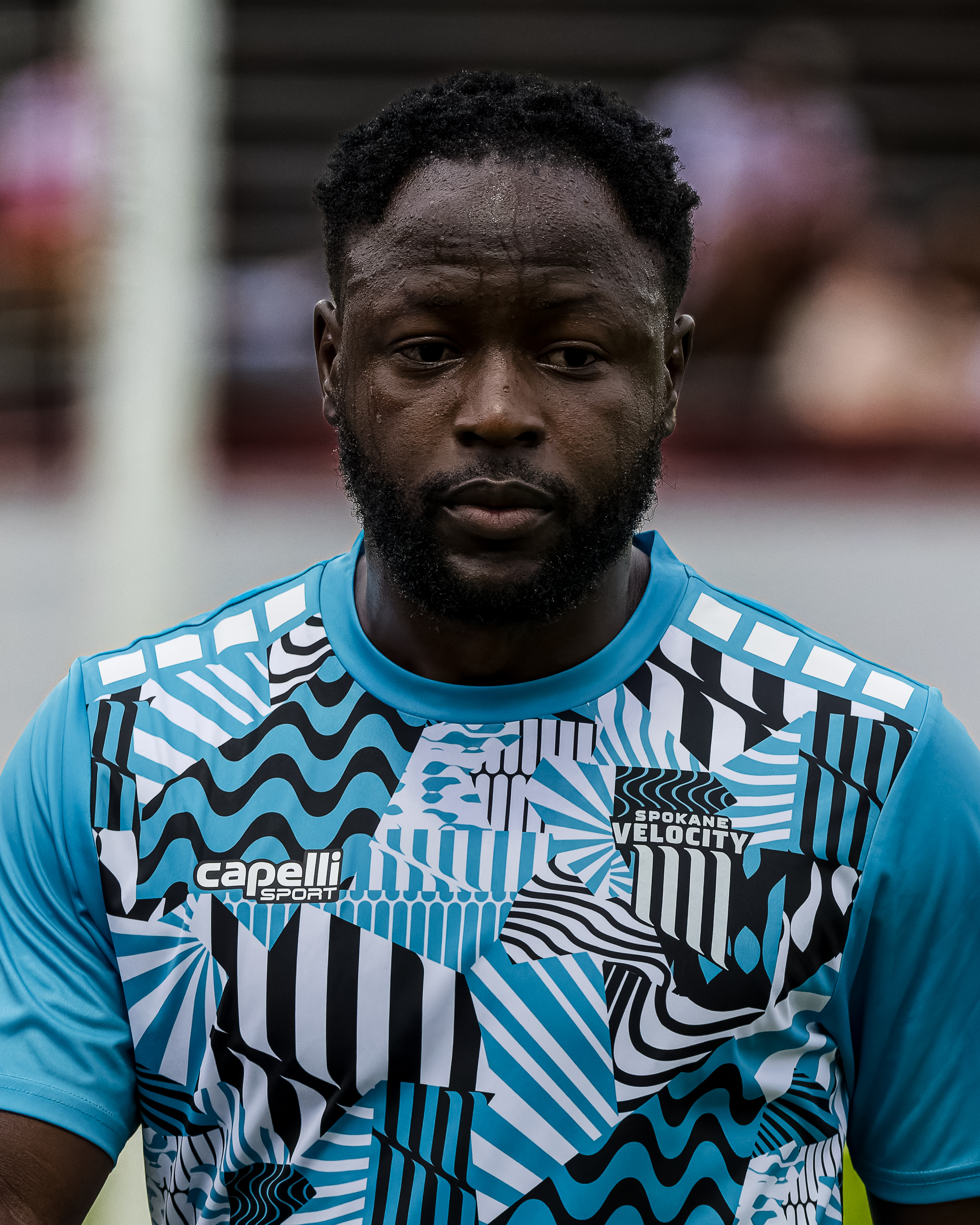
- Brett with Spokane Velocity in 2026

Personal information
- Full name: Neco Jeborie Brett
- Date of birth: 22 March 1992 (age 34)
- Place of birth: Kingston, Jamaica
- Height: 1.72 m (5 ft 8 in)
- Position: Forward

Team information
- Current team: Spokane Velocity
- Number: 9

College career
Years	Team	Apps	(Gls)
2012–2015	Robert Morris Colonials	67	(32)

Senior career*
Years	Team	Apps	(Gls)
2011–2012	Harbour View	2	(1)
2011–2012	→ Portmore United (loan)	5	(0)
2014	Fort Pitt Regiment		
2015	Reading United	8	(4)
2016	Portland Timbers	1	(0)
2016	→ Portland Timbers 2 (loan)	28	(8)
2017	Portland Timbers 2	7	(0)
2018–2019	Pittsburgh Riverhounds	67	(32)
2020–2021	Birmingham Legion	48	(27)
2022	New Mexico United	23	(7)
2023	Birmingham Legion	30	(12)
2024	Memphis 901	4	(0)
2025–	Spokane Velocity	51	(12)

International career
- Jamaica U17
2011	Jamaica U20	5	(4)
2022–	Jamaica	1	(0)
- * Club domestic league appearances and goals as of 12:58, 2 November 2026 (UTC)

Neco Jeborie Brett (born 22 March 1992) is a Jamaican footballer who plays as a forward for USL League One club Spokane Velocity.

== Club career ==
Brett began his career in Jamaica with Harbour View and Portmore United before moving to the United States to play college soccer at Robert Morris University.

=== Portland Timbers ===
On 14 January 2016, Brett was selected in the second round (40th overall) of the 2016 MLS SuperDraft by Portland Timbers. He made his MLS debut as a late sub in a 4–2 win against Vancouver Whitecaps FC on 22 May 2016.

=== Pittsburgh Riverhounds ===
In 2018, Brett signed with the Pittsburgh Riverhounds. On 26 October 2019, he tied a Riverhounds record with four goals in a 7–0 win over Birmingham Legion FC in the Eastern Conference quarterfinals of the USL Championship playoffs.

=== Birmingham Legion ===
On 17 December 2019, Brett joined Birmingham Legion FC. Brett made his debut for Birmingham on 15 July 2020 during a 3–0 victory over Memphis 901 FC. Brett would go on to score his first and second goals for Birmingham on 5 August 2020 during a 4–1 victory over Charlotte Independence. Brett would finish the 2020 season as Birmingham's leading scorer with 9 goals. On 28 September 2021, Brett was named USL Championship Player of the Week for Week 23 of the 2021 season for his hat trick against Atlanta United 2. Brett earned the Legion FC golden boot award for a second consecutive season with 18 goals in 2021.

=== New Mexico United ===
Brett signed a contract for the 2022 season with USL Championship side New Mexico United on 31 December 2021. Brett scored in his debut on 13 March 2022 during a 2–0 victory over Las Vegas Lights FC. On 11 April 2022, Brett was awarded the USL Championship Goal of the Month award for his chipped finish in a 2–1 victory over El Paso Locomotive FC on 20 March 2022.

=== Return to Birmingham Legion ===
On 20 January 2023, Nett re-joined his previous club Birmingham Legion.

=== Memphis 901 ===
Brett signed a multi-year contract with Memphis 901 on 25 January 2024.

=== Spokane Velocity ===
Following Memphis 901 folding after the 2024 season, Brett later joined USL League One club Spokane Velocity on 25 February 2025.

== International career ==
In 2011, Brett played for the Jamaica u20 national team in Mexico. He was called up to represent the Jamaica national team in May 2022. He made his debut in a 6–0 friendly defeat to Catalonia on 25 May.

== Career statistics ==
As of 21 October 2022

Club	Season	League			National Cup		League Cup		Continental		Total	
Club	Season	Division	Apps	Goals	Apps	Goals	Apps	Goals	Apps	Goals	Apps	Goals
Harbour View	2011-12	National Premier League	2	1	—		—		—		2	1
Harbour View	Total		2	1	—		—		—		2	1
Portland Timbers	2016	MLS	1	0	1 (Note: Appearance(s) and goal(s) in the U.S. Open Cup)	0	—				2	0
Portland Timbers	Total		1	0	1	0	—		—		2	0
Portland Timbers II (loan)	2016	USL	28	8	—		—		—		28	8
Portland Timbers II	2017	USL	7	0	—		—		—		7	0
Portland Timbers II	Total		7	0	—		—		—		7	0
Pittsburgh Riverhounds SC	2018	USL	34	15	2	0	—		—		36	15
Pittsburgh Riverhounds SC	2019	USL Championship	33	17	2	2	—		—		35	19
Pittsburgh Riverhounds SC	Total		67	32	4	2	—		—		71	34
Birmingham Legion	2020	USL Championship	17	9	—		—		—		17	9
Birmingham Legion	2021	USL Championship	31	18	—		—		—		31	18
Birmingham Legion	Total		48	27	—		—		—		48	27
New Mexico United	2022	USL Championship	23	7	1	1	—		—		24	8
Career total			176	75	6	3	—		—		182	78
