= Anderson Asiedu =

Ghanaian footballer

Personal information
- Full name: Anderson Kumi Asiedu
- Date of birth: 12 June 1996 (age 30)
- Place of birth: Dormaa Ahenkro, Bono Region, Ghana
- Height: 1.68 m (5 ft 6 in)
- Position: Midfielder

Team information
- Current team: FC Motown
- Number: 21

Youth career
- 2013–2015: Players Development Academy

College career
Years	Team	Apps	(Gls)
2015–2016	Monmouth Hawks	37	(2)
2017–2018	UCLA Bruins	34	(3)

Senior career*
Years	Team	Apps	(Gls)
2016–2017	New York Red Bulls U-23	20	(0)
2018	FC Golden State Force	3	(0)
2019	Atlanta United	0	(0)
2019	→ Atlanta United 2 (loan)	10	(0)
2019–2023	Birmingham Legion	114	(3)
2024	Hartford Athletic	24	(0)
2025	FC Motown	0	(0)
2025–	Virginia Dream	0	(0)
- * Club domestic league appearances and goals as of 20 March 2025

Anderson Asiedu (born 12 June 1996) is a Ghanaian footballer who plays as a midfielder for FC Motown.

== Early life ==
Asiedu was born in Dormaa Ahenkro, Ghana. Following his mother's death and a short stint living with his grandmother, he lived in an orphanage. At 16, he was discovered by Sylvers Owusu, a native Ghanaian who was in the country looking for players for the soccer team he coached at a high school in New Jersey. Shortly thereafter, he enrolled at St. Benedict's Prep in Newark, New Jersey on a soccer scholarship. He won a state and national championship with St. Benedict's in 2014, as well as the 2013-2014 USSDA U17/18 national championship with Players Development Academy.

== College career ==
Asiedu started his college career at Monmouth, where he started 37 games for the Hawks in two seasons, scoring two goals and adding five assists. As a freshman, he was named to the All-Northeast Region and All-MAAC first teams, as well as the All-MAAC rookie team. As a sophomore, he was named to the All-MAAC second team.

Following his sophomore year, he transferred to UCLA to play for the Bruins. He started 34 games over two seasons, scoring three goals and adding four assists. He was named to the All-Pac-12 second team in both seasons and was named to the Pac-12 All-Academic team as a senior.

== Professional career ==
Following a successful college career, Asiedu was drafted with the last pick of the first round of the 2019 MLS SuperDraft by defending MLS Cup champions Atlanta United. On 1 March 2019 he signed with the club ahead of the 2019 Major League Soccer season, and began the season on loan with the club's reserve team, Atlanta United 2. After making 10 appearances for Atlanta United 2, Asiedu was waived by the club on 31 May.

On 15 July 2019, Asiedu signed with USL Championship side Birmingham Legion. He left Birmingham following their 2023 season after five seasons with the club.

Asiedu joined Hartford Athletic on 14 December 2023. He left Hartford following their 2024 season.

Asiedu joined FC Motown in 2025 for the club's appearance in the 2025 U.S. Open Cup. Asiedu then appear for NPSL side Virginia Dream in their cup fixture against Loudoun United on 3 April 2025.
