= Jake Rufe =

American soccer player (born 1996)

Personal information
- Full name: Jacob Rufe
- Date of birth: January 22, 1996 (age 30)
- Place of birth: Huntsville, Alabama, United States
- Height: 1.86 m (6 ft 1 in)
- Positions: Defender; midfielder

College career
Years	Team	Apps	(Gls)
2014–2015	Indiana Hoosiers	0	(0)
2016–2018	Western Michigan Broncos	55	(2)

Senior career*
Years	Team	Apps	(Gls)
2016–2017	AFC Ann Arbor		
2018	Michigan Bucks	9	(0)
2019	AFC Ann Arbor	12	(0)
2019	Stumptown Athletic	1	(0)
2020–2025	Birmingham Legion	119	(3)
- * Club domestic league appearances and goals as of October 25, 2025

Jacob Rufe (born January 22, 1996) is an American soccer player who most recently played as a defender for Birmingham Legion FC.

== Career ==
=== High School ===
Ruff played for Virgil I Grissom High School located in Huntsville, Alabama.

=== College and amateur ===
Rufe began playing college soccer at Indiana University in 2014, but didn't make an appearances for the Hoosiers during his two seasons due to injury. In 2016, Rufe transferred to Western Michigan University, where he played for three seasons, scoring 2 goals and tallying 4 assists in 55 appearances.

During college, Rufe also played with NPSL side AFC Ann Arbor in both 2016 and 2017. In 2018, Rufe played in the USL PDL with Michigan Bucks.

After college, Rufe returned to play with AFC Ann Arbor during their 2019 season.

=== Professional ===
In September 2019, Rufe signed for NISA side Stumptown Athletic ahead of the league's inaugural season.

In May 2020, Rufe moved to USL Championship side Birmingham Legion. He was released by Birmingham following their 2025 season.
