= Phanuel Kavita =

Rwandan footballer

Personal information
- Full name: Phanuel Kavita Mabaya
- Date of birth: 9 March 1993 (age 33)
- Place of birth: Lubumbashi, Zaire
- Height: 1.85 m (6 ft 1 in)
- Position: Defender

Team information
- Current team: Birmingham Legion
- Number: 3

Youth career
- 2010–2011: Real Salt Lake AZ

College career
| Years | Team | Apps | (Gls) |
| 2011–2014 | Clemson Tigers | | |

Senior career*
| Years | Team | Apps | (Gls) |
| 2015–2016 | Real Salt Lake | 3 | (0) |
| 2015–2016 | → Real Monarchs (loan) | 38 | (1) |
| 2017 | Puerto Rico FC | 27 | (1) |
| 2018–2020 | Saint Louis FC | 79 | (3) |
| 2021– | Birmingham Legion | 159 | (3) |

International career^{‡}
| 2025– | Rwanda | 11 | (1) |
- * Club domestic league appearances and goals as of 31 October 2026 ‡ National team caps and goals as of 13 November 2026

Phanuel Kavita Mabaya (born 9 March 1993) is a professional footballer who plays as a defender for Birmingham Legion in the USL Championship also captaining the team. Born in the DR Congo, he plays for the Rwanda national team.

== Career ==
=== College ===
Kavita spent his entire college career at Clemson University. He started all 81 games during his four-year career with the Tigers and led them to an ACC Tournament title in his senior year.

=== Professional ===
On 17 January 2015, Kavita signed a homegrown contract with Real Salt Lake. On 22 March, he made his professional debut with USL affiliate club Real Monarchs SLC in a 0–0 draw against LA Galaxy II.

On 28 April 2017, Puerto Rico FC announced the signing of Kavita.

On 12 December 2017, Kavita signed with USL side Saint Louis FC.

Following the dissolution of Saint Louis FC, Kavita joined Birmingham Legion on 8 December 2020.

== Personal life ==
Kavita was born to a Congolese father and a Rwandan mother.

== International career ==
He debuted with the Rwanda national team in a friendly 2–0 loss to Algeria on 5 June 2025.

=== International goals ===
As of match played 13 November 2026

Appearances and goals by national team and year
| National team | Year | Apps | Goals |
|---|---|---|---|
| Rwanda | 2025 | 5 | 0 |
| Rwanda | 2026 | 5 | 1 |
| Total | | 10 | 1 |

As of match played 13 November 2026
Scores and results list Rwanda's goal tally first, score column indicates score after each Kavita goal.

List of international goals scored by Phanuel Kavita
| No. | Date | Venue | Opponent | Score | Result | Competition |
|---|---|---|---|---|---|---|
| 1 | 13 November 2026 | 26 March Stadium, Bamako, Mali | Mali | 2–1 | 2–3 | 2027 Africa Cup of Nations qualification |
