= Enzo Martínez (footballer, born 1990) =

Uruguayan footballer (born 1990)

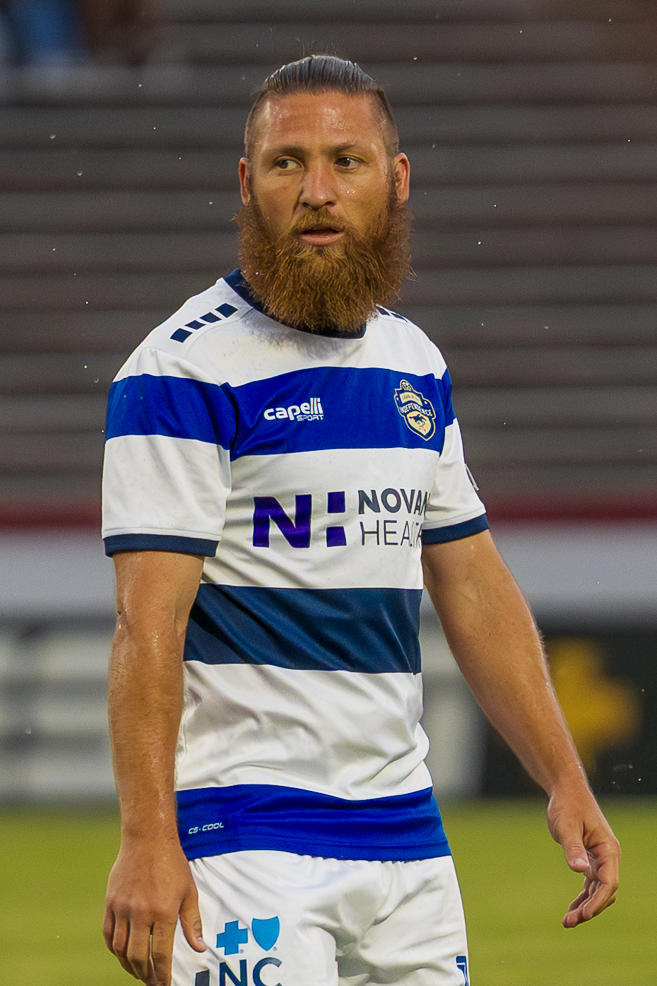
- Martinez with Charlotte Independence in 2026

Personal information
- Full name: Enzo Agustín Martínez Beltrán
- Date of birth: September 29, 1990 (age 36)
- Place of birth: Montevideo, Uruguay
- Height: 5 ft 7 in (1.70 m)
- Position: Attacking midfielder

Team information
- Current team: Charlotte Independence
- Number: 19

Youth career
- 2006–2009: Discoveries SC

College career
Years	Team	Apps	(Gls)
2009–2011	North Carolina Tar Heels	72	(22)

Senior career*
Years	Team	Apps	(Gls)
2012–2013	Real Salt Lake	0	(0)
2013	→ Carolina RailHawks (loan)	15	(3)
2014	Carolina RailHawks	21	(6)
2015–2017	Charlotte Independence	79	(29)
2018	Colorado Rapids	22	(0)
2019–2021	Charlotte Independence	70	(16)
2022–2025	Birmingham Legion	130	(34)
2026–	Charlotte Independence	19	(3)
- * Club domestic league appearances and goals as of October 28, 2026

Enzo Agustín Martínez Beltrán (born September 29, 1990) is a Uruguayan footballer who plays for USL League One club Charlotte Independence.

== Career ==
=== Youth and college ===
Martínez grew up in Rock Hill, South Carolina where he starred for Discoveries Soccer Club and Northwestern High School, winning a national championship at both levels. ESPN later named Martínez as the ESPN Rise High School Boys' Soccer Player of the Decade after finishing his career with three state championships, one FAB 50 national title and 182 goals.

He then played for the North Carolina Tar Heels, appearing in 72 matches and scoring 22 goals.

=== Professional ===
On January 12, 2012, Martínez was selected 17th overall by Real Salt Lake in the first round of the 2012 MLS SuperDraft.

After not seeing any playing time in 2012, Martínez was sent on a short-term loan to NASL club Carolina RailHawks on April 30, 2013. Four days later, he made his debut for the RailHawks and netted the equalizing goal in the club's 2–2 draw on the road at Minnesota United FC.

Martínez was not retained by Real Salt Lake after the season and rejoined Carolina on a permanent basis.

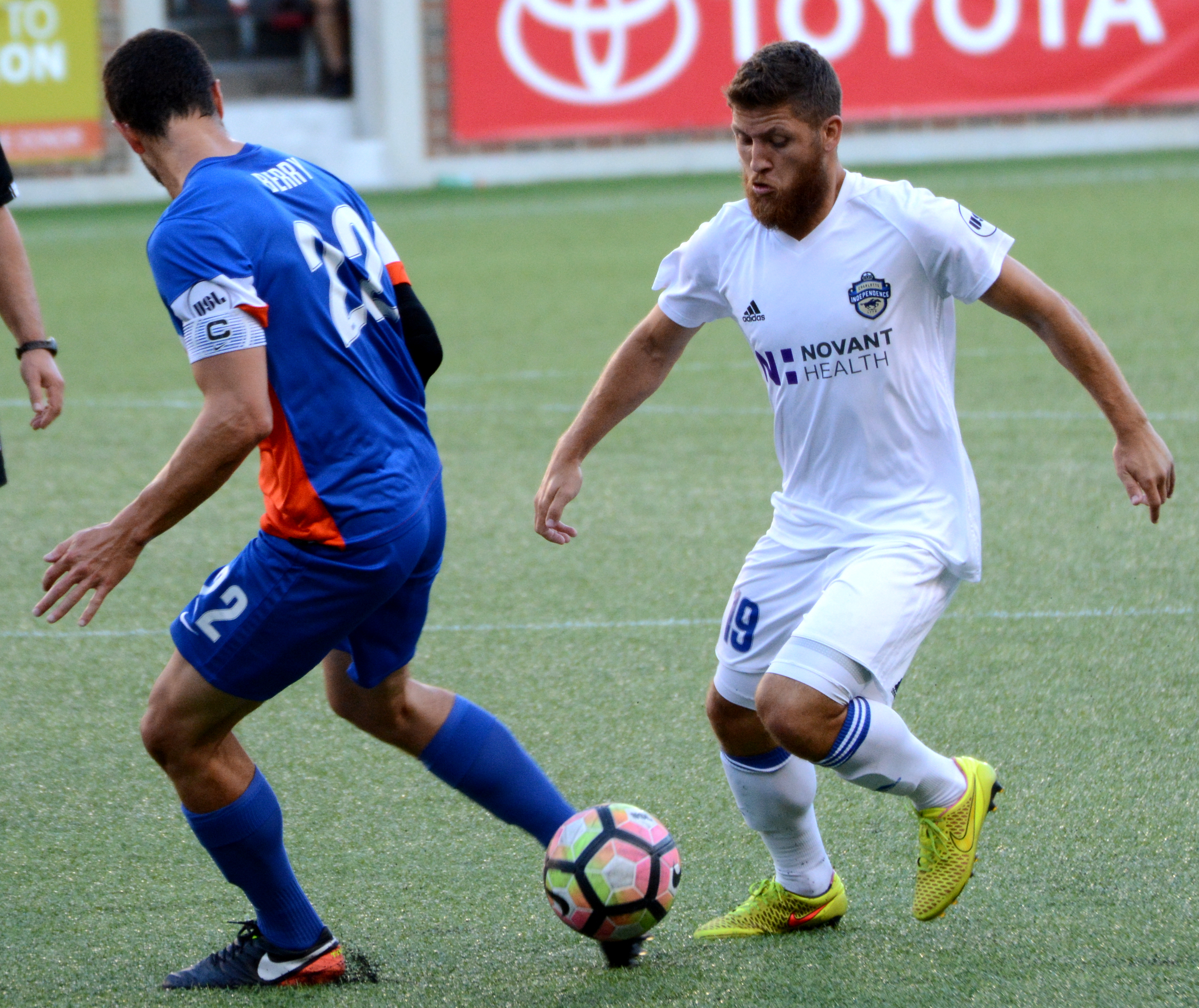
Martínez (right) with Charlotte Independence in 2017

Martínez signed with Charlotte Independence of the United Soccer League in March 2015.

On February 19, 2018, Martínez returned to MLS when he signed with Colorado Rapids. The Rapids sent a fourth-round pick in the 2021 MLS SuperDraft to acquire his rights from Real Salt Lake. Martínez was released by Colorado at the end of their 2018 season.

Martínez moved to USL Championship side Birmingham Legion on January 7, 2022. He was released by Birmingham following their 2025 season.

== Honors ==
Individual

- USL Championship All League First Team (3): 2016, 2017, 2022

== Personal life ==
He is the older brother of Alex Martínez, who played for Charlotte Independence.
