= Birmingham Legion FC =

American professional soccer club

- Full name: Birmingham Legion FC
- Founded: August 9, 2017; 9 years ago
- Stadium: Protective Stadium
- Capacity: 47,100
- Owners: Jack Bryant; Neilinho Colesco; John Harbert; Jeff Logan; James Outland; Jim Rein; Lee Styslinger III; Enrique Cerezo; Chris Richards
- President and general manager: Jay Heaps
- Head coach: Jay Heaps
- League: USL Championship
- 2025: 12th, Eastern Conference; Playoffs: DNQ
- Website: bhmlegion.com
Home colors	Away colors

Birmingham Legion FC is an American professional soccer club based in Birmingham, Alabama, that competes in the USL Championship, the second division of American soccer. The team was established in August 2013 and played under the name Birmingham Hammers until 2018 and began their first professional season as Legion FC on March 10, 2019.

== History ==
On August 9, 2017, the United Soccer League (now known as USL Championship), the Division II sanctioned league by the United States Soccer Federation, granted a team for Birmingham to begin play in the 2019 season. On January 17, 2018, the team name was revealed as Birmingham Legion FC, a reference to the historic Legion Field that opened in 1927. However, the team instead played at BBVA Field, the home of the UAB Blazers soccer program.

Oak Mountain High School graduate and Real Monarchs' star forward Chandler Hoffman signed on as the team's first player in July 2018. In August the team announced that Tom Soehn would be the first head coach of Birmingham Legion FC.

Their first professional game resulted in a 2–0 defeat against Bethlehem Steel FC on March 10, 2019.

During the 2023 U.S. Open Cup, Birmingham Legion FC defeated a Major League Soccer (MLS) side for the first time, with a 1-0 win over Charlotte FC in the round of 16. The game was played at Protective Stadium before a record home crowd of 12,722. Legion FC's U.S. Open Cup run was cut short by MLS team Inter Miami CF after a 0-1 loss at Protective Stadium in the quarter-final of the U.S. Open Cup, setting yet another record attendance of 18,418 spectators.

== Stadium ==
Legion FC played its home matches at Protective Stadium, which also serves as the Blazers' home field, which began in the 2021-22 season.

On March 15, 2021, Legion FC was forced to move its scheduled match against rival Memphis 901 to historic Legion Field because of unplayable pitch conditions at PNC Field, caused by heavy rains in the previous days. The match, dubbed "Legion at Legion," drew a club-record crowd of 10,177, which the club said was also the largest crowd ever to attend a professional soccer match in Alabama. (Legion Field's largest soccer crowd ever was a 1996 Summer Olympics match between the United States and Argentina, which also set the stadium's all-time attendance record with 83,810 fans.) Inclement weather also forced delays or cancellations in other matches.

In November 2021, the club and the University of Alabama System Board of Trustees agreed to terminate Legion FC's eight-year lease early. No reason was announced through official channels. On December 7, 2021, the club announced the Legion would play their home games at Protective Stadium starting with their 2022 season.

== Club culture ==
=== Rivalries ===
Birmingham competed in the Southern Harm derby against rivals Memphis 901.

=== Supporters ===
The Magic City Brigade and The Puentas 12 are the supporters of the team.

== Sponsorship ==
Period	Kit manufacturer	Shirt sponsor
2019–2021	Nike	Red Diamond
2022–2023	Nike	Coca-Cola; BODYARMOR
2024–present	Hummel	Coca-Cola; BODYARMOR

== Players and staff ==
=== Roster ===
As of November 8, 2026

Note: Flags indicate national team as defined under FIFA eligibility rules; some limited exceptions apply. Players may hold more than one non-FIFA nationality.

No.	Pos.	Nation	Player
1	GK	CZE	Jassem Koleilat
3	DF	RWA	Phanuel Kavita
6	MF	AUS	Sam McIllhatton
8	MF	NCA	Kadeem Cole
9	FW	HAI	Ronaldo Damus
11	DF	USA	Dawson McCartney
12	GK	USA	Trevor McMullen
14	MF	ENG	Samuel Shashoua
15	FW	CAN	Tyler Pasher
16	MF	JAM	Peter-Lee Vassell

No.	Pos.	Nation	Player
17	FW	JAM	Romario Williams
18	MF	GHA	Seth Antwi
19	MF	USA	Gevork Diarbian
20	DF	GRN	A. J. Paterson
21	FW	URU	Sebastian Tregarthen
23	FW	USA	Sebastian Saucedo
26	DF	ANT	Amir Daley
27	DF	USA	Bryce Washington
32	DF	SEN	Hamady Diop
77	DF	JAM	Nico Brown

=== Team management ===
Front office
Owners	Jack Bryant; Billy Harbert; John Harbert; Jeff Logan; James Outland; Jim Rein; Lee Styslinger III; Chris Richards
Chief Executive Officer	Jay Heaps
President	Jonathan Nelson
Vice President of Operations	Jason Coleman
Senior Director of Marketing	David Koonce
Director of Partnerships	Nick Weldon
Coaching staff
Head coach	Jay Heaps
First team assistant coach	Eric Avila

Last updated: JAugust 7, 2026}

== Team records ==
=== Year-by-year ===
As of December 19, 2025

This is a partial list of the last five seasons completed by the club. For the full season-by-season history, see List of Birmingham Legion FC seasons.

Season	USL Championship								Play-offs	U.S. Open Cup	Top scorer ^{1}		Head coach	Avg. attendance
Season	P	W	L	D	GF	GA	Pts	Pos	Play-offs	U.S. Open Cup	Player	Goals	Head coach	Avg. attendance
2021	32	18	8	6	51	31	61	2nd, Central	Conference semifinals	Canceled	(Jamaica) Neco Brett	18	(United States) Tom Soehn	4,389
2022	34	17	10	7	56	37	58	4th, Eastern	Conference quarterfinals	3rd Round	(Uruguay) Enzo Martínez	15	(United States) Tom Soehn	5,405
2023	34	14	16	4	44	53	46	7th, Eastern	Conference semifinals	Quarter Final	(Jamaica) Neco Brett	11	(United States) Tom Soehn	5,091
2024	34	13	15	6	44	51	45	9th, Eastern	Did not qualify	Ro32	(Brazil) Stéfano Pinho	14	(United States) Tom Soehn	3,708
2025	30	5	13	12	36	50	27	12th, Eastern	Did not qualify	R1	(Haiti) Ronaldo Damus	11	(England) Mark Briggs	4,490

1. Top scorer includes statistics from league matches only.

=== Head coaches ===
- Includes USLC regular season, USLC playoffs, U.S. Open Cup. Excludes friendlies.

Coach	Nationality	Start	End	Games	Win	Loss	Draw	Win %
Tom Soehn	United States	August 16, 2018	April 9, 2025	167	77	61	29	46.11
Mark Briggs	United Kingdom	April 30, 2025		0	0	0	0	—
