= 2016 PDL season =

USL Premier Development League
- Season: 2016
- Champion: Michigan Bucks (3rd Title)
- Regular Season Champions: Michigan Bucks (5th Title)
- Matches: 469
- Goals: 1,472 (3.14 per match)
- Best player: (Jamaica) Chevaughn Walsh Ocean City Nor'easters
- Top goalscorer: (Jamaica) Chevaughn Walsh Ocean City Nor'easters (14 Goals)
- Best goalkeeper: (United States) Ryan Cretens Carolina Dynamo
- Biggest home win: DSM 9, WSA 0 (June 25); MCH 9, PIT 0 (July 16)
- Biggest away win: KWU 7, TFC 0 (May 17)
- Highest scoring: DSM 9, WSA 0 (June 25); MCH 9, PIT 0 (July 16)
- Longest winning run: 7, Fresno Fuego (May 19 - June 18)
- Longest unbeaten run: 13, San Diego Zest FC (May 14 - end of season)
- Longest winless run: 12, Cinc. Dutch Lions (May 28 - end of season)
- Longest losing run: 8, LA Laguna FC (May 8 - June 21); OC Blues U-23 (June 12 - end of season)
- All statistics correct as of July 19, 2016.

The 2016 USL Premier Development League season was the 22nd season of the PDL. The regular season began on May 6 and ended on July 17, consisting of 67 teams playing across 10 divisions. The Michigan Bucks were the playoff champions.

== Conferences ==
Western Conference	Southern Conference	Central Conference	Eastern Conference
Northwest Division: Alberta; British Columbia; Oregon; Washington; Central Pacific Division: California; Nevada; Utah; Southwest Division: California; Arizona	Midsouth Division: Missouri; Mississippi; New Mexico; Oklahoma; Texas; Southeast Division: Florida	Great Lakes Division: Kentucky; Michigan; Ohio; Ontario; Pennsylvania; Heartland Division: Illinois; Indiana; Iowa; Manitoba; Missouri; Ontario	South Atlantic Division: Georgia; North Carolina; South Carolina; Tennessee; West Virginia; Mid Atlantic Division: Maryland; New Jersey; Pennsylvania; Virginia; Northeast Division: Connecticut; Maine; Massachusetts; New Hampshire; New York

== Changes From 2015 ==
=== New/Returning teams ===
Team name	Metro Area	Location	Previous Affiliation
(Indiana) Kokomo Mantis FC	Kokomo Metro Area	Kokomo, Indiana	Expansion Team
Oklahoma City Energy U23	Oklahoma City	Oklahoma City, Oklahoma	Expansion Team
(Georgia (U.S. state)) Tormenta FC	Bulloch County, Georgia	Statesboro, Georgia	Expansion Team
(California) San Francisco City FC	San Francisco Bay Area	San Francisco, California	US Club Soccer
(Georgia (U.S. state)) Peachtree City MOBA	Metro Atlanta	Peachtree City, Georgia	Expansion Team
(California) San Diego Zest FC	San Diego–Tijuana	San Diego, California	Expansion Team
(Florida) The Villages SC	Sumter County, Florida	The Villages, Florida	Expansion Team
(California) FC Golden State Force	Los Angeles County	Pasadena, California	Expansion Team
South Florida Surf	Treasure Coast	Port St. Lucie, Florida	Expansion Team
(Tennessee) Tri-Cities Otters	Tri-Cities, Tennessee	Johnson City, Tennessee	Expansion Team
(Massachusetts) FC Boston		Boston, Massachusetts	Expansion Team
(Virginia) Evergreen FC	Washington DC	Leesburg, Virginia	Expansion Team
(British Columbia) Victoria Highlanders	Greater Victoria	Victoria, British Columbia	PDL (2009–14); Returns from Pacific Coast Soccer League

=== Name Changes ===
- Golden State Misioneros became LA Laguna FC.
- Springfield Synergy became Saint Louis FC U23.

=== Folding/Moving ===
- Forest City London – moved to League1 Ontario
- Houston Dutch Lions – moved to National Premier Soccer League
- Puget Sound Gunners FC – Folded
- Boston Rams – Folded
- Real Colorado Foxes – Folded
- D.C. United U-23 – Folded its PDL team
- Orlando City U-23 – Folded its PDL team
- Ocala Stampede – Folded

=== On Hiatus ===
- Laredo Heat

== Standings ==
=== Tiebreakers ===
1. Head-to-head results
2. Goal differential
3. Goals scored

=== Eastern Conference ===
==== Northeast Division ====
Pos	Team	Pld	W	L	T	GF	GA	GD	Pts	Qualification
1	GPS Portland Phoenix	14	9	3	2	36	20	+16	29	Advance to Eastern Conference Divisional Qualifiers
2	Western Mass Pioneers	14	7	3	4	27	23	+4	25	Advance to Eastern Conference Divisional Qualifiers
3	Long Island Rough Riders	14	6	5	3	26	24	+2	21	
4	FC Boston	14	6	6	2	22	24	−2	20	
5	Seacoast United Phantoms	14	5	5	4	20	22	−2	19	
6	AC Connecticut	14	5	6	3	26	25	+1	18	
7	Westchester Flames	14	4	8	2	15	21	−6	14	
8	F.A. Euro	14	2	8	4	13	26	−13	10	

Source: Premier Development League
Rules for classification: Tiebreakers

==== Mid Atlantic Division ====
Pos	Team	Pld	W	L	T	GF	GA	GD	Pts	Qualification
1	Reading United AC	14	10	3	1	35	12	+23	31	Advance to Eastern Conference Divisional Qualifiers
2	Ocean City Nor'easters	14	9	5	0	36	21	+15	27	Advance to Eastern Conference Divisional Qualifiers
3	Baltimore Bohemians	14	7	5	2	26	21	+5	23	
4	New York Red Bulls U-23	14	6	4	4	23	20	+3	22	
5	Jersey Express S.C.	14	5	7	2	24	28	−4	17	
6	Lehigh Valley United Sonic	14	3	10	1	8	24	−16	10	
7	Evergreen FC	14	2	8	4	16	42	−26	10	

Source: Premier Development League
Rules for classification: Tiebreakers

==== South Atlantic Division ====
Pos	Team	Pld	W	L	T	GF	GA	GD	Pts	Qualification
1	Charlotte Eagles	14	11	2	1	34	8	+26	34	Advance to Eastern Conference Championship
2	Carolina Dynamo	14	10	3	1	27	8	+19	31	Advance to Eastern Conference Divisional Qualifiers
3	SC United Bantams	14	7	4	3	20	18	+2	24	Advance to Eastern Conference Divisional Qualifiers
4	King's Warriors	14	7	5	2	16	14	+2	23	
5	South Georgia Tormenta FC	14	6	5	3	22	18	+4	21	
6	Peachtree City MOBA	14	3	9	2	15	29	−14	11	
7	West Virginia Chaos	14	3	9	2	13	32	−19	11	
8	Tri-Cities Otters	14	1	10	3	14	32	−18	6	

Source: Premier Development League
Rules for classification: Tiebreakers

=== Central Conference ===
==== Great Lakes Division ====
Pos	Team	Pld	W	L	T	GF	GA	GD	Pts	Qualification
1	Michigan Bucks (R)	14	12	2	0	45	7	+38	36	Advance to Central Conference Championship
2	K-W United FC	14	11	2	1	37	18	+19	34	Advance to Central Conference Championship
3	Derby City Rovers	14	7	5	2	31	25	+6	23	
4	Dayton Dutch Lions	14	4	5	5	23	30	−7	17	
5	Pittsburgh Riverhounds U23	14	2	8	4	14	30	−16	10	
6	TFC Academy	14	2	8	4	14	36	−22	10	
7	Cincinnati Dutch Lions	14	1	10	3	11	31	−20	6	

Source: Premier Development League
Rules for classification: Tiebreakers
(R) Regular Season Champions

==== Heartland Division ====
Pos	Team	Pld	W	L	T	GF	GA	GD	Pts	Qualification
1	Des Moines Menace	14	10	2	2	37	7	+30	32	Advance to Central Conference Championship
2	Thunder Bay Chill	14	7	2	5	33	19	+14	26	Advance to Central Conference Championship
3	Chicago Fire U-23	14	8	4	2	28	18	+10	26	
4	Kokomo Mantis FC	14	4	6	4	23	25	−2	16	
5	St. Louis Lions	14	2	8	4	19	28	−9	10	
6	WSA Winnipeg	14	1	11	2	7	51	−44	5	

Source: Premier Development League
Rules for classification: Tiebreakers

=== Southern Conference ===
==== Southeast Division ====
Pos	Team	Pld	W	L	T	GF	GA	GD	Pts	Qualification
1	The Villages SC	14	9	3	2	37	18	+19	29	Advance to Southern Conference Championship
2	South Florida Surf	14	8	2	4	28	15	+13	28	Advance to Southern Conference Championship
3	FC Miami City	14	6	4	4	31	22	+9	22	
4	Floridians FC	14	6	5	3	20	16	+4	21	
5	SW Florida Adrenaline	14	5	8	1	16	32	−16	16	
6	IMG Academy Bradenton	14	4	9	1	14	25	−11	13	
7	Palm Beach Suns FC	14	2	9	3	12	30	−18	9	

Source: Premier Development League
Rules for classification: Tiebreakers

==== Mid South Division ====
Pos	Team	Pld	W	L	T	GF	GA	GD	Pts	Qualification
1	OKC Energy FC U23	14	10	3	1	33	15	+18	31	Advance to Southern Conference Championship
2	Midland/Odessa Sockers	14	8	3	3	20	14	+6	27	Advance to Southern Conference Championship
3	Mississippi Brilla	14	4	6	4	14	20	−6	16	
4	Saint Louis FC U23	14	3	8	3	17	29	−12	12	
5	Albuquerque Sol FC	14	3	9	2	11	23	−12	11	

Source: Premier Development League
Rules for classification: Tiebreakers

=== Western Conference ===
==== Northwest Division ====
Pos	Team	Pld	W	L	T	GF	GA	GD	Pts	Qualification
1	Calgary Foothills FC	14	8	3	3	22	12	+10	27	Advance to Western Conference Divisional Qualifiers
2	Seattle Sounders FC U-23	14	8	6	0	21	16	+5	24	Advance to Western Conference Divisional Qualifiers
3	Washington Crossfire	14	5	4	5	16	14	+2	20	
4	Kitsap Pumas (Note: Kitsap Pumas had three points deducted for using an illegal player against Victoria Highlanders.)	14	5	4	5	12	15	−3	17	
5	Victoria Highlanders	14	3	5	6	17	19	−2	15	
6	Lane United FC	14	3	5	6	13	16	−3	15	
7	Portland Timbers U23s	14	2	7	5	14	23	−9	11	

Source: Premier Development League
Rules for classification: Tiebreakers

==== Central Pacific Division ====
Pos	Team	Pld	W	L	T	GF	GA	GD	Pts	Qualification
1	Fresno Fuego (Note: Fresno Fuego deducted one point for illegal substitution against San Francisco City FC.)	14	10	3	1	23	11	+12	30	Advance to Western Conference Divisional Qualifiers
2	Burlingame Dragons FC	14	7	5	2	28	19	+9	23	Advance to Western Conference Divisional Qualifiers
3	San Francisco City FC	14	6	6	2	19	16	+3	20	
4	BYU Cougars	14	4	6	4	12	18	−6	16	
5	Las Vegas Mobsters	14	3	8	3	13	26	−13	12	

Source: Premier Development League
Rules for classification: Tiebreakers

==== Southwest Division ====
Pos	Team	Pld	W	L	T	GF	GA	GD	Pts	Qualification
1	FC Tucson	14	11	1	2	38	12	+26	35	Advance to Western Conference Championship
2	San Diego Zest FC	14	8	1	5	27	12	+15	29	Advance to Western Conference Divisional Qualifiers
3	FC Golden State Force	14	8	4	2	38	23	+15	26	Advance to Western Conference Divisional Qualifiers
4	Ventura County Fusion	14	7	4	3	24	18	+6	24	
5	Southern California Seahorses	14	2	9	3	17	24	−7	9	
6	Orange County Blues U-23	14	2	10	2	13	38	−25	8	
7	LA Laguna FC (Note: LA Laguna FC had three points deducted for not having a proper venue.)	14	2	11	1	17	44	−27	4	

Source: Premier Development League
Rules for classification: Tiebreakers

== Playoffs ==
Divisional Qualification	Conference Semifinals
SA1	Charlotte Eagles	0
MA2	Ocean City Nor'easters	1
NE1	GPS Portland Phoenix	1
MA2	Ocean City Nor'easters	3
Eastern Conference
MA1	Reading United AC	3
NE2	Western Mass Pioneers	1
MA1	Reading United AC	2
SA2	Carolina Dynamo	1
SA2	Carolina Dynamo	4
SA3	SC United Bantams	1
SW1	FC Tucson	3
CP2	Burlingame Dragons FC	2
CP1	Fresno Fuego	2
CP2	Burlingame Dragons FC	3*
Western Conference
NW1	Calgary Foothills FC	3*
NW2	Seattle Sounders FC U-23	1
NW1	Calgary Foothills FC	1
SW3	FC Golden State Force	0
SW2	San Diego Zest FC	2
SW3	FC Golden State Force	3*
GL1	Michigan Bucks	3
HL2	Thunder Bay Chill	0
Central Conference
HL1	Des Moines Menace	5
GL2	K-W United FC	1
MS1	Oklahoma City Energy U23	2
SE2	South Florida Surf	1
Southern Conference
SE1	The Villages SC	1
MS2	Midland/Odessa Sockers	2

Conference Finals
MA2	Ocean City Nor'easters	4
MA1	Reading United AC	1
SW1	FC Tucson	1
NW1	Calgary Foothills FC	2
GL1	Michigan Bucks	2
HL1	Des Moines Menace	0
MS1	Oklahoma City Energy U23	0 (1)
MS2	Midland/Odessa Sockers	0 (2)*

Semifinals
MA2	Ocean City Nor'easters	0
NW1	Calgary Foothills FC	3
GL1	Michigan Bucks	3
MS2	Midland/Odessa Sockers	0

Championship
NW1	Calgary Foothills FC	2
GL1	Michigan Bucks	3

- After extra time

=== Conference Championships ===
The PDL Conference Championships were held on the weekend of July 22–24, with the four conference champions advancing to the PDL Semifinals.

=== Eastern Conference ===
July 19, 2016 South Atlantic Division Play-in Game	(North Carolina) Carolina Dynamo	4–1	(South Carolina) SC United Bantams	Greensboro College; Greensboro, North Carolina
5:45 PM EDT	Ramsell 29'; Nyepon 32'; Elliot 88'; Anunga 90'	Report	Bradley 15'

July 19, 2016 InterDivision Play-in Game	(Pennsylvania) Reading United AC	3–1	(Massachusetts) Western Mass Pioneers	Don Thomas Stadium; Reading, Pennsylvania
7:00 PM EDT	Boukemia 40'; Pierrot 69'; Noumansana 70'; Antic (yellow card)	Report	Viera 23' (yellow card); Ruiz (yellow card); Burokas (yellow card)

July 19, 2016 InterDivision Play-in Game	(Maine) GPS Portland Phoenix	1–3	(New Jersey) Ocean City Nor'easters	New England College; Portland, Maine
8:00 PM EDT	Ekern 69'; Pappalardo (yellow card); Vazquez (yellow card); Melville (red card) 35'; Havey (yellow card); Hall (yellow card)	Report	Walsh 14'; Regis 16'; Mwape 46'; Umar (yellow card); Jaime (yellow card)

July 23, 2016 Conference Semifinal	(North Carolina) Charlotte Eagles	0–1	(New Jersey) Ocean City Nor'easters	Don Thomas Stadium; Reading, Pennsylvania
5:00 PM EDT	Micaletto (yellow card); Denton (yellow card)	Report	Walsh 42'

July 23, 2016 Conference Semifinal	(Pennsylvania) Reading United AC	2–1	(North Carolina) Carolina Dynamo	Don Thomas Stadium; Reading, Pennsylvania
7:30 PM EDT	Reedy 46'; Waso 63'; Curran (yellow card)	Report	Anunga 16'; Punyed (yellow card); Wahlfeldt (yellow card)

July 24, 2016 Conference Final	(Pennsylvania) Reading United AC	1–4	(New Jersey) Ocean City Nor'easters	Don Thomas Stadium; Reading, Pennsylvania
7:00 PM EDT	Molloy 22' (yellow card); Conde (yellow card); Boukemia (yellow card)	Report	Mwape 53'; Regis 76', 90'; Jaime 89'; Nimmo (yellow card); Walsh (yellow card)

=== Southern Conference ===
July 22, 2016 Conference Semifinal	(Florida) The Villages SC	1–2	(Texas) Midland/Odessa Sockers	Taft Stadium; Oklahoma City, Oklahoma
6:00 PM CDT	DaCosta 77'; Wi. Pereira (yellow card); We. Pereira (yellow card)	Report	Mesias 7'; Henrique 55'; Sanchez (yellow card); Ruiz (yellow card)

July 22, 2016 Conference Semifinal	(Oklahoma) OKC Energy U23	2–1	(Florida) South Florida Surf	Taft Stadium; Oklahoma City, Oklahoma
9:00 PM CDT	Keats 2'; Conway 20'; Prost (yellow card); Hoskins (yellow card); Taylor (red card) 90'	Report	Marriott 64'; O'Sullivan (yellow card); Gonzalez (yellow card); Decker (yellow card)

July 23, 2016 Conference Final	(Oklahoma) OKC Energy U23	0–0 (1–2 p)	(Texas) Midland/Odessa Sockers	Taft Stadium; Oklahoma City, Oklahoma
4:00 PM CDT		Report
	Penalties
	Keats (penalty missed); Conway (penalty scored); Dennis (penalty missed); McLaughlin (penalty missed)		(penalty scored) Machado; (penalty missed) Masson; (penalty scored) Sanchez; (penalty missed) Markovic

=== Central Conference ===
July 22, 2016 Conference Semifinal	(Iowa) Des Moines Menace	5–1	(Ontario) K-W United FC	Ultimate Soccer Arena; Pontiac, Michigan
5:00 PM EDT	Heath-Preston 6', 37', 58'; Wypych 26'; McCrary 65'; Hoek (yellow card) 84'	Report	Miller (yellow card) 31'; Reynolds (yellow card) 57'; Camargo 77'

July 22, 2016 Conference Semifinal	Michigan Bucks	3–0	(Ontario) Thunder Bay Chill	Ultimate Soccer Arena; Pontiac, Michigan
7:30 PM EDT	Fitzpatrick 60' (yellow card); Najem 69'; Owens 81'; Wysong (yellow card)	Report	Leyrielton (yellow card); Stojcevski (yellow card)

July 23, 2016 Conference Final	Michigan Bucks	2–0	(Iowa) Des Moines Menace	Ultimate Soccer Arena; Pontiac, Michigan
7:30 PM EDT	Cicerone 68', 89'	Report	Brotherton (yellow card); Heath-Preston (yellow card); Ibisevic (yellow card); Wypych (yellow card)

=== Western Conference ===
July 19, 2016 Northwest Division Play-in Game	(Alberta) Calgary Foothills FC	3–1 (a.e.t.)	(Washington (state)) Seattle Sounders FC U-23	Broadview Field; Calgary, Alberta
9::30 PM MDT	Russo 36' (yellow card); Sarkaria 104'; Fakunle 112'; Adekugbe (yellow card)	Report	Teupen 48' (yellow card); Bjornethun (yellow card); Crisler (yellow card); Aguinaga (yellow card)

July 19, 2016 Central Pacific Division Play-in Game	(California) Fresno Fuego	2–3 (a.e.t.)	(California) Burlingame Dragons FC	Chukchansi Park; Fresno, California
10:00 PM PDT	Chaney 30'; Da Rosa 88'; Campos (yellow card); Nogales (yellow card)	Report	Baird 37'; Arramdani 41'; Thierjung 100' (yellow card); Ramos (yellow card); Somera (yellow card); Smith (yellow card); Cox (yellow card)	Attendance: 4,972

July 19, 2016 Southwest Division Play-in Game	(California) San Diego Zest FC	2–3 (a.e.t.)	(California) FC Golden State Force	James Madison High School; San Diego, California
10:00 PM PDT	Hurlow-Paonessa 16', 90'; Camara (yellow card); Hoeckendorff (yellow card) (yellow-red card); Reyes (yellow card); Núñez (yellow card)	Report	Carrera-García 52'; Verso 71'; Gordon 110'; Turner (yellow card); Hernández (yellow card)

July 22, 2016 Conference Semifinal	(Alberta) Calgary Foothills FC	1–0	(California) FC Golden State Force	Kino Sports Complex; Tucson, Arizona
9:00 PM MDT	Russo 71'	Report	Carrera-García (yellow card); Turner (yellow card)	Attendance: 1,052

July 22, 2016 Conference Semifinal	(Arizona) FC Tucson	3–2	(California) Burlingame Dragons FC	Kino Sports Complex; Tucson, Arizona
11:00 PM MDT	Espindola 29'; Turner 37'; Ramos 83' (yellow card); Papa (yellow card); Waldrep (yellow card)	Report	Arramdani 61'; Thierjung 79'; Ramos (yellow card)	Attendance: 1,052

July 23, 2016 Conference Final	(Arizona) FC Tucson	1–2	(Alberta) Calgary Foothills FC	Kino Sports Complex; Tucson, Arizona
10:30 PM MDT	Papa (red card) 8'; Adams 65'; Scott (yellow card); Herrera (yellow card); Ramos (yellow card)	Report	Russo 45'; Zator 80'; Northover (yellow card); Adekugbe (yellow card)	Attendance: 1,121

=== PDL Championship ===
The PDL Championship semi-finals are to be held on the week of July 24–31. The 2016 PDL Championship Game will be held on the weekend of August 5–7.

=== Semifinals ===
July 30, 2016 National Semifinal	(New Jersey) Ocean City Nor'easters	0–3	(Alberta) Calgary Foothills FC	Tennessee Avenue Soccer Complex; Ocean City, New Jersey
5:00 PM EDT	Nimmo (yellow card); Howe (yellow card); Jaime (yellow card); Walsh (yellow card); Umar (yellow card)	Report	Sarkaria 53'; Jones 69'; Pasquotti 86'; Hyams (yellow card)

July 30, 2016 National Semifinal	Michigan Bucks	3–0	(Texas) Midland/Odessa Sockers	Ultimate Soccer Arenas; Pontiac, Michigan
7:30 PM EDT	Landell 18', 60'; Vries 65'; Abubakar (yellow card); Ramon (yellow card)	Report

=== Championship Game ===
August 6, 2016 National Final	Michigan Bucks	3–2	(Alberta) Calgary Foothills FC	Ultimate Soccer Arenas; Pontiac, Michigan
7:30 PM EDT	Cicerone 23', 87'; Goldsmith 74'	Report	Pasquotti 38'; Russo 60'; Adekugbe (yellow card); Jones (yellow card); Wheeldon (yellow card)	Attendance: 1,486

Championship MVP: (United States) Russell Cicerone (MIB)

== Awards ==
- Most Valuable Player: (Jamaica) Chevaughn Walsh (OCN)
- Young (U21) Player of the Year: (Germany) Sven Koenig (KWU)
- Coach of the Year: (United States) Demir Muftari, (MIB)
- Defender of the Year: (Ghana) Alhassan Abubakar (MIB)
- Goalkeeper of the Year: (United States) Ryan Cretens (CAR)
- Creative Player of the Year: (Afghanistan) Adam Najem (MIB)

=== Weekly Awards ===
Player of the Week
Week	Player	Club	Position	Reason	Ref.
1	(United States) Jamael Cox	Burlingame Dragons FC	Forward	2 goals in 2 wins against Fresno Fuego and LA Laguna FC	
2	(United States) Michael Yantz	SW Florida Adrenaline	Goalkeeper	8 Saves in team's first win vs FC Miami City	
3	(United States) Christian Chaney	Fresno Fuego	Forward	5 goals in 2 games against Las Vegas Mobsters	
4	(England) Jay Wheeldon	Calgary Foothills FC	Defender	playing a key role in helping record two wins over Northwest Division rivals the Portland Timbers U23s	
5	(United States) AJ Sheta	Evergreen FC	Midfielder	hat-trick in comeback win against Jersey Express	
6	(Germany) Sven Koenig	K-W United FC	Forward	hat trick against Derby City Rovers	
7	(Sweden) Anton Widen	South Georgia Tormenta FC	Goalkeeper	15 total saves in shutout wins against Charlotte Eagles and Carolina Dynamo	
8	(Argentina) Juan Correa	Jersey Express SC	Midfielder	2 goals, 3 assists in 2 wins over Baltimore Bohemians, and Lehigh Valley United Sonic	
9	(United States) Mark Verso	FC Golden State Force	Forward	hat trick in 6–0 win over Orange County Blues U-23	
10	(Brazil) Sullivan Silva	Thunder Bay Chill	Forward	5 goals, 1 assists in 4 games	
11	(Brazil) Afonso Pinheiro	FC Tucson	Forward	4 goals, 1 assist in 3 games vs BYU Cougars twice, and Colorado Rapids U-23	

Team of the Week
Week	Goalkeeper	Defenders	Midfielders	Forwards	Honorable Mentions	Ref.
1	(Spain) Angoitia (TUC)	(England) Wharf (LIR) (United States) Stadler (LNU) (United States) J. Smith (BUR)	(Austria) Binder (LNU) (United States) Sanchez (KIT) (United States) Roswess (WMP) (France) Le Nours (MIA)	(United States) Cox (BUR) (United States) Collins (SFS) (United States) Vu (TUC)	(Puerto Rico) Ramos (KIT) (United States) Botte (LIR) (Colombia) Ruiz (SFS)	
2	(United States) Yantz (SWF)	(Canada) Russo (CGY) (United States) Aune (WAS) (England) Ryan (SUP) (United States) Stalboerger (SDZ)	(United States) G. Blanco (OCB) (Brazil) Cruz (MIS) (United States) Schmitt (TUC) (United States) M. Blanco (FRE)	(United States) Graham (OKC) (Jamaica) Bennett (REA)	(United States) Ekern (GPP) (United States) Merriam (BAL) (Italy) Micaletto (CHE) (United States) Cole (SWV) (Colombia) Ruiz (SFS) (United States) Willis (LNU)	
3	(United States) Ihn (KOK)	(Canada) Montgomery (VIC) (Republic of Ireland) McCabe (SFC) (Scotland) Nimmo (OCN) (Germany) Hezel (MIA)	(United States) Kenawy (BOS) (France) Marie (REA) (United States) Stark (WAS)	(United States) Cicerone (MIB) (United States) Chaney (FRE) (Canada) Ricci (KWU)	(Colombia) Perea (MIA) (United States) Fitzpatrick (MIB) (United States) Taylor (MIO) (United States) Sanchez (KIT) (United States) Collister (IMG) (United States) Hunter (BYU) (United States) Taylor (WMP) (England) Greenway-Tambini (ACC) (France) Guégan (WVC) (United States) Miezan (SUP) (Scotland) Cousin (DDL) (United States) Thielfoldt (SLL)	
4	(Jamaica) Campbell (DMM)	(Australia) Phelps (SWV) (England) Wheeldon (CGY) (United States) Jiménez (CHI)	(Cyprus) Charalambous (MIB) (United States) Karcz (JER) (England) Keats (OKC) (Germany) Baus (SFC)	(Democratic Republic of the Congo) Mbuyu (CHE) (Guinea) Kourouma (MIA) (United States) Dokaj (KOK)	(United States) German (TUC) (Peru) Arce (FLO) (United States) Brew (FLO) (Chile) Medina (FLO) (United States) Shepherd (MIB) (United States) Smythe (CIN) (United States) Lara (OCB)	
5	(Brazil) Pinto (DDL)	(England) Hoskins (OKC) (United States) Barnathan (POR) (United States) Kilwien (SFS)	(United States) Sheta (EVG) (United States) Zandi (REA) (Canada) Dhillon (VIC) (England) Marshall (LIR)	(Serbia) Markovic (MIO) (Brazil) da Silva (TRI) (United States) Devivo (WES)	(Venezuela) Cichero (OKC) (United States) Morton (LVU) (United States) Polley (LVU) (United States) Cox (BUR) (Nigeria) Achara (GPP) (Chile) Medina (FLO) (Brazil) Dias (VIL) (Philippines) de Vera (POR) (United States) Chapin (BAL) (United States) Bryan (SCU) (United States) Martin (NYR)	
6	(United States) Velleca (ACC)	(United States) Castellan (SCU) (United States) Botes (CHE) (United States) Barksdale (SCS) (Ivory Coast) N'guessan (JER)	(Brazil) Coutinho (SFS) (France) Marie (REA) (England) Veidman (DMM)	(United States) Henry (MIS) (North Macedonia) Musovski (BUR) (Germany) Koenig (KWU)	(United States) Chaney (FRE) (Netherlands) Tuithof (DDL) (Argentina) Correa (JER) (United States) Klabough (MIO) (Afghanistan) Najem (MIB) (Brazil) Junior (SUP) (United States) Kenawy (BOS)	
7	(Sweden) Widen (SGT)	(United States) Browne (SCU) (Guatemala) Herrera (TUC) (United States) Wheeler-Omiunu (SEA) (United States) Meyer (BYU)	(Finland) Pahkasalo (DER) (United States) Lynch (DDL) (England) Holland (VCF)	(Brazil) Araujo (VIL) (Bermuda) Brangman (WMP) (United States) Hurlow-Paonessa (SDZ)	(Canada) Cain (KWU) (Brazil) Silva (TBC) (England) Veidman (DMM); Jimenez (MIS) (United States) Lema (NYR) (Nigeria) Achara (GPP) (England) Keats (OKC) (Chile) Medina (FLO) (United States) Chaney (FRE) (Canada) Russo (CGY) (Canada) Bauche (CGY)	
8	(Italy) Guerra (SGT)	(Canada) Zator (CGY) (Saint Kitts and Nevis) Springer (KWU) (Brazil) Machado (MIO)	(United States) De Lima (VIL) (Spain) Aguinaga (SEA) (United States) Miezan (SUP) (Argentina) Correa (JER)	(Jamaica) Walsh (OCN) (United States) Contreras (SCS) (England) Veidman (DMM)	(United States) Brew (FLO) (England) Landell (MIB) (Trinidad and Tobago) Regis (OCN) (United States) Barlow (DMM) (United States) Coons (MIO) (United States) G. Mobley (MIO) (United States) T. Mobley (MIO) (Germany) Koenig (KWU) (United States) Basuljevic (NYR) (United States) Rey (FRE) (United States) Millard (SCU) (Ivory Coast) N'guessan (JER) (United States) Cox (BUR) (England) Hoskins (OKC)	
9	(United States) Putna (CHI)	(England) McGuinness (IMG) (United States) Eronemo (KIT) (United States) Miele (ABU)	(England) Keats (OKC) (United States) Cicerone (MIB) (Spain) Nogales (FRE) (United States) Schmitt (TUC)	(United States) Verso (GSF) (Brazil) Araujo (VIL) (England) Greenway-Tambini (ACC)	(United States) Browne (SCU) (Jamaica) Walsh (OCN) (United States) German (TUC) (United States) Rey (FRE) (United States) Thomas (SWF) (Germany) Teupen (SEA) (United States) Milne (GPP)	
10	(United States) Cretens (CAR)	(United States) Pineda (CHI) (United States) Markey (WAS) (United States) Howe (OCN) (England) Lamb (WMP)	(Brazil) Leme (GPP) (France) Boukemia (REA) (United States) Lynch (DDL)	(Brazil) Silva (TBC) (United States) Arramdani (BUR) (Colombia) Perea (MIA)	(United States) Basuljevic (NYR) (United States) Barlow (DMM) (United States) Hurlow-Paonessa (SDZ) (United States) Allmaras (SDZ) (United States) Verso (GSF) (United States) Lightbourne (STL) (Spain) Moar (CHE) (Kenya) Omondi (CHE) (England) Keats (OKC) (Canada) Mills (KWU) (England) Blackman (SWV) (United States) Santana (PBS) (United States) Swartz (BOS)	
11	(United States) Shepherd (MIB)	(Sweden) James (CAR) (United States) Moro (ACC) (Canada) Davidson (KIT) (Colombia) Pineda (TUC)	(Canada) Danto (WSA) (England) Kirkland (SFC) (United States) Englis (IMG)	(Canada) Rollocks (TFC) (Brazil) Pinheiro (TUC) (United States) Verso (GSF)	(Canada) Hyrich-Krueger (WSA) (Germany) Koenig (KWU) (United States) Basuljevic (NYR) (United States) Cicerone (MIB) (Brazil) Camargo (KOK) (Brazil) Veira (PIT) (United States) Fidler (PCM) (United States) Milne (GPP) (Canada) Dupont (CIN) (United States) G. Blanco (OCB) (Brazil) Troccoli (PBS)	

== All-League and All-Conference Teams ==
=== Eastern Conference ===
F: (Trinidad and Tobago) Nathan Regis (OCN), (Spain) Santi Moar (CHE), (Jamaica) Chevaughn Walsh (OCN) *
M: (United States) Arun Basuljevic (NYR) *, (Italy) Marco Micaletto (CHE), (France) Paul Marie (REA)
D: (United States) Cameron Botes (CHE), (Spain) Juan Sanchez (CHE), (United States) Marquez Fernandez (BAL) *, (United States) Peyton Ericson (TRM)
G: (United States) Ryan Cretens (CAR) *

=== Central Conference ===
F: (Germany) Sven Koenig (KWU), (Brazil) Sullivan Silva (TBC), (United States) Russell Cicerone (MIB)
M: (Finland) Aleksi Pahkasalo (DRC), (United States) Anthony Putrus (TBC), (Canada) Sergio Camargo (KWU)
D: (Ghana) Alhassan Abubakar (MIB) *, (England) Tom Owens (MIB) *, (United States) Austin Ledbetter (DMM), (Senegal) Moustapha Fofana (DRC)
G: (Jamaica) Nico Campbell (DMM)

=== Western Conference ===
F: (United States) Mark Verso (GSF), (United States) Christian Chaney (FRE) *, (Canada) Dominic Russo (CGY) *
M: (United States) Michael Turner (TUC), (United States) Erik Holt (SDZ), (Mexico) Jose Hernandez (GSF)
D: (United States) Josh Smith (BUR), (Philippines) Niko de Vera (POR), (Canada) Gordon Hall (TUC), (United States) Nathan Aune (WAS)
G: (United States) Augustin Rey (FRE)

=== Southern Conference ===
F: (United States) Carlos Araujo (VIL), (Brazil) Bruno Henrique (MIO), (Guinea) Mohamed Kourouma (MIA)
M: (England) Tosan Popo (SWF), (Brazil) Lucas Coutinho (SFS) *, (England) Noah Keats (OKC) *
D: (Kenya) Kimathi Kaumbutho (SWF), (Brazil) Fernando Machado (MIO), (Colombia) Sebastian Pineda (OKC), (England) Josh Taylor (OKC) *
G: (Brazil) Paulo Pita (VIL)

* denotes All-League player

=== All-League Team ===
F: (Canada) Dominic Russo (CGY), (United States) Christian Chaney (FRE), (Jamaica) Chevaughn Walsh (OCN)
M: (United States) Arun Basuljevic (NYR), (Brazil) Lucas Coutinho (SFS), (England) Noah Keats (OKC)
D: (United States) Marquez Fernandez (BAL), (England) Tom Owens (MIB), (England) Josh Taylor (OKC), (Ghana) Alhassan Abubakar (MIB)
G: (United States) Ryan Cretens (CAR)

=== All-Playoff Team ===
F: (United States) Russell Cicerone (MIB) (Championship Game MVP), (Canada) Dominic Russo (CGY), (Canada) Ajeej Sarkaria (CGY)
M: (Canada) Kyle Jones (CGY), (England) Elijah Adekugbe (CGY), (South Africa) Jade Mesias (MIO)
D: (Canada) Dominick Zator (CGY), (Ghana) Alhassan Abubakar (MIB), (Brazil) Fernando Machado (MIO), (New Zealand) Francis de Vries (MIB)
G: (Canada) Dylon Powley (CGY)

== Attendance ==
Teams with an average home attendance of at least 1,000:

Team	Home average
Fresno Fuego	3,441
Des Moines Menace	2,856
Burlingame Dragons	2,357
FC Tucson	1,379
Albuquerque Sol	1,121
