= Sánchez =

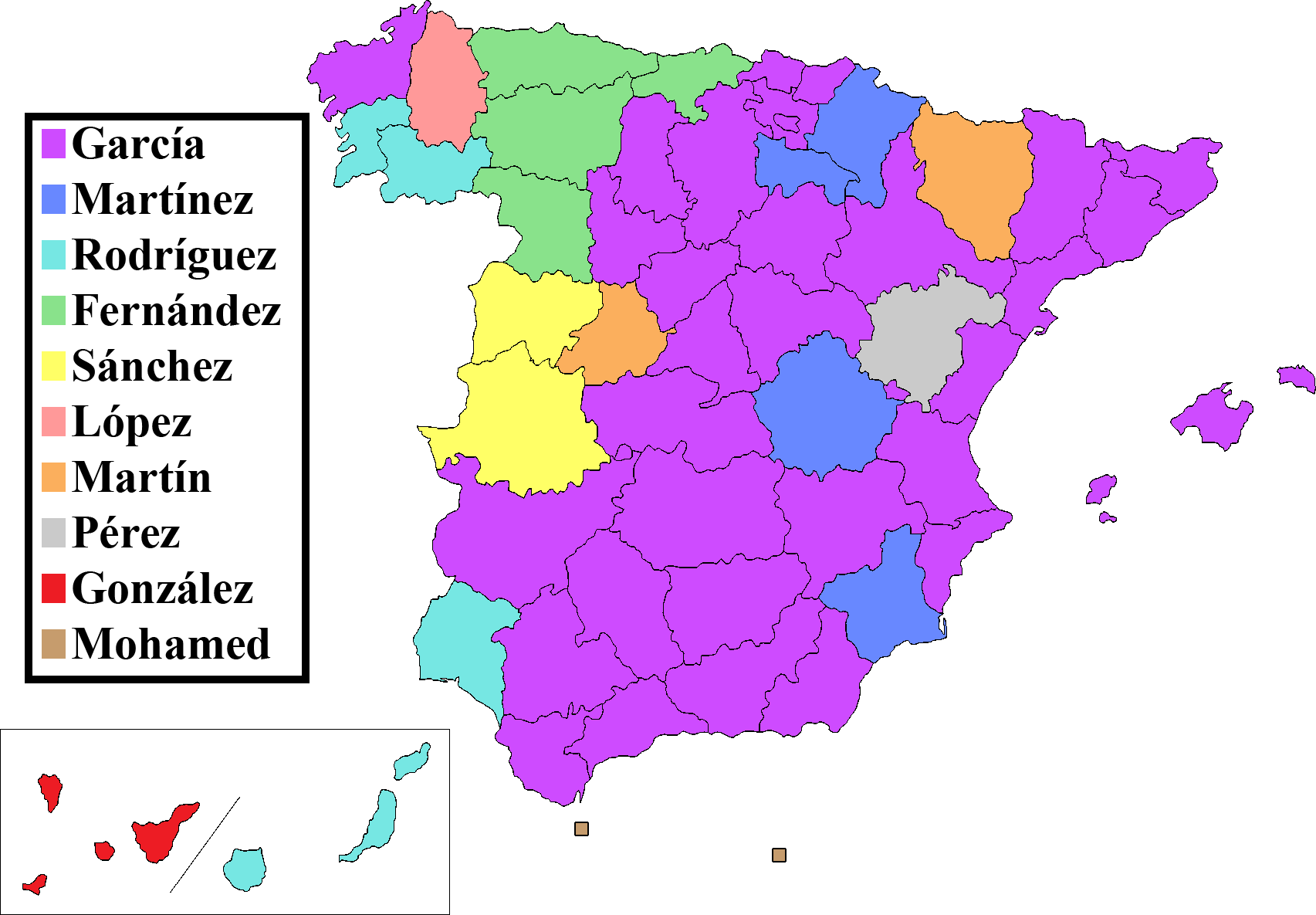
- Sánchez is the most common surname in the Spanish provinces of Cáceres and Salamanca
- Pronunciation: Spanish: [ˈsantʃeθ], Latin American Spanish: [ˈsantʃes]

Origin
- Meaning: "Son of Sancho" (Latin: sanctus 'holy')
- Region of origin: Spain

Other names
- Variant forms: Sanches, Sanchiz, Sanguez, Saez, Sanz, Sanzio (Ital. vers.)

Sánchez is a Spanish family name.

== Historical origins ==
"The illustrious Sanchez Family... is descended from one of a number of Gothic knights (caballeros) who in the year 714 escaped from the ‘barbara furia’ of the Mohammedan invasion and took up their residence in the hills of Leon, Galicia, Asturia, Burgos, and the Pyrenees. They took part under the Gothic king of the Asturias Pelayo (Pelagius), in the battle of Covadonga (730?) against the Mohammedans, and then returned to the Pyrenees where they elected as their leader Don Garcia Ximenez. From here they passed down into Navarre and Aragon..."

In the 8th century, Duke Lupus Sanchez assisted the first Holy Roman Emperor, Charlemagne, in capturing the fortress city of Barcelona from the Muslims. Duke Lupus Sanchez commanded military assets comparable to or greater than those of Alfred the Great of Wessex (England) and was able to mobilize a militia of 27,000 or more to garrison the fortress cities of Gascony.

There were several kings named Sancho in the Christian Kingdoms of Spain, between the 8th and 15th centuries. Their children took on the surname Sanchez. For example Sancho III Garces "The Great", King of Pamplona (980–1035), fathered Garcia III (IV) Sanchez, King of Navarra (1015–1054); Ramiro I Sanchez, King of Aragon (1010–1063); Fernando I Sanchez "The Great," King of Castile and Emperor of Leon (1020–1063); Gonzalo Sanchez, King of Huesca (1022–1054; and Urraca Sanchez, Infanta (Crown Princess).

Interestingly, Garcia III Sanchez, the King of Navarra, had an illegitimate son, whose grandson married the daughter of Rodrigo Diaz de Vivar ("El Cid"). Their son, Garcia Ramirez "The Restorer" became King of Navarre (Navarra).

The origins of the name Sanchez lie in the ancient Christian Kingdoms of northern Spain and southern France (the name is more than 1,300 years old), the Spanish Conquistadors carried it to the New World. During the 1500s to the 1700s, colonists with the name Sánchez settled in areas that are now part of the southwestern United States (arriving in what is now New Mexico in the 1598 Juan de Oñate Expedition), Mexico, and South America, so there are numerous people in these areas with the surname of Sanchez. In addition, the name is found in nearly every western European country, as well as other parts of the world.

The ancestors of individuals with the surname of Sanchez may include those who invaded and/or settled in Spain during its long history. Such as the Celts, Vikings, Phoenicians, Iberians, Romans, Visigoths, Mohammedans, and Sephardic Jews. In addition, those who moved to the New World may also, to varying degrees, share other European, Native American, African, or other ancestries.

There are, literally, dozens of coats of arms for the name Sanchez, dating from ancient to more recent times. Generally, coats of arms were given to individuals with the name Sanchez, who then passed them down to descendants, usually through the male line. However, coats of arms for large groups of Sanchezes in certain geographical regions may exist. The most widespread coat of arms features a crowned gold eagle on a field of azure (royal blue).

== Popularity ==
Sanchez is the fifth most common surname in Spain.

Sanchez in Spain, by area
Province	Rank
Salamanca	1st most common (12,420 people)
Cáceres	2nd most common (5,956 people)
Cádiz	3rd most common (19,396 people)
Granada	3rd most common (13,268 people)
Toledo	3rd most common (6,308 people)

Sanchez ranking in other parts of the world
Country	Rank
Argentina	ranked 10th out of 100
France	ranked 52nd out of 1,000
Netherlands	ranked 9,489th out of 9,980
Philippines	ranked 21st out of 1,000 (Note: See also: Appendix:Filipino_surnames_(1-1000))
United States	ranked 26th out of 162,253

== People with the surname ==
- Aarón Sanchez (born 1976), American celebrity chef
- Araceli Sánchez Urquijo (1920 – 2010), Niños de Rusia child evacuee in Spanish Civil War and the first woman to work as a civil engineer in Spain
- Carlos Sánchez, multiple people
- Cristian Sanchez (born 1972), Chilean Journalist/Presenter
- Enrique Sánchez, multiple people
- Felipe Sánchez Román y Gallifa (1893–1956), Spanish jurist
- Francisco Sánchez Chamuscado (1512–1582), Spanish conquistador and Captain of the Chamuscado and Rodríguez Expedition of 1581-1582
- Graciela Sanchez (born 1960), American social justice activist
- Ilich Ramírez Sánchez (born 1949), Venezuelan terrorist also known as Carlos the Jackal
- Javier Sánchez, multiple people
- Jesús Sánchez, multiple people
- Jose Tomas Sanchez (1920–2012), Filipino Prefect emeritus of the Congregation for the Clergy, Roman Curia
- Luis Sánchez (disambiguation), multiple people
- Manuel Sánchez (born 1950), Mexican economist
- Manuela Cornejo Sanchez (1854–1902), Argentine composer
- Ricardo Sanchez (born 1953), retired American Army Lieutenant General
- Rick Sanchez (born 1958), Journalist-MSNBC & CNN
- Robert Fortune Sanchez (1934–2012), American Roman Catholic archbishop
- Roselyn Sánchez (born 1973), Puerto Rican singer, model and actress
- Susan M. Sanchez (born 1959), American applied statistician and operations researcher
- Tatiana Sanchez (born 1991), British newsreader

=== Arts ===
==== General ====
- Abel Sanchez (also known as Oqwa Pi), San Ildefonso Pueblo painter, muralist, and politician
- Aldo Sambrell (1931–2010), a European actor also known as "Alfredo Sanchez Brell"
- Eduardo Sánchez (born 1968), Cuban-American filmmaker
- Encarna Sánchez (1935–1996), Spanish television show host
- Jorge Luis Sánchez (1960–2025), Cuban film director
- Jorge Noceda Sánchez (1925–1987), Dominican surrealist painter
- Julio Sánchez Cristo (born 1959), Colombian radio personality
- Kiele Sanchez (born 1977), American actress
- Korina Sanchez (born 1964), Filipino news anchor and host
- Lauren Sanchez (born 1969), American celebrity
- Lucia Sanchez (born 1969), French actress
- M. Jenea Sanchez (born 1985), Mexican-American artist
- Mario Ernesto Sánchez (died 2025), Cuban actor and theater founder
- Nancy Friedemann-Sánchez (born 1961), Colombian-American visual artist, based in Lincoln, Nebraska
- Nia Sanchez, Miss USA 2014
- Rick Sanchez (born 1958), Cuban-American TV news anchor
- Sylvia Sanchez (born 1971, real name: Josette Campo), Filipina actress
- Zilia Sánchez Domínguez (1928–2024), Cuban-born Puerto Rico artist
- Lorenzo Sanchez-Diamond (1978–Present) Puerto Rican-American Marine Colonel, attorney, and scholar.

==== Musical artists ====
- Adán Sánchez (1984–2004), Mexican-American singer
- Chalino Sánchez (1960–1992), Mexican singer and songwriter
- Claudio Sanchez (born 1978), American rock singer and guitarist of the band 'Coheed and Cambria'
- Lourdes Sánchez (born 1986), Argentine singer, dancer, model, TV host and actress
- Magdalena Sánchez (1915–2005), Venezuelan singer
- Marta Sánchez (born 1966), Spanish female vocalist
- Mike Sanchez (born 1964), English Rhythm and Blues pianist/vocalist
- Stephen Sanchez (born 2002), American singer-songwriter
- Gabriel Sanchez (born 1976), American song recorder

==== Writers ====
- Adolfo Sánchez Vázquez (1915–2011), Mexican writer and professor
- Alex Sanchez (born 1957), American author of teen stories
- Erika L. Sánchez, poet and writer
- Luis Rafael Sánchez (born 1936), Puerto Rican playwright and author
- Sergio G. Sánchez (born 1973), Spanish director and screenwriter

=== Politicians ===
- Alicia Sánchez-Camacho (born 1967), Spanish politician
- Arman Sanchez (1952–2010), Filipino politician, former Governor of the province of Batangas
- Augusto Martínez Sánchez (1923–2013), Cuban politician
- Edna Sanchez, Filipino politician
- Felipe Sánchez Román (1850–1916), Spanish lawyer and politician
- Francisco Sánchez (American politician) (1805–1862), Eighth Alcade of San Francisco
- Francisco del Rosario Sánchez (1817–1861), founding father of the Dominican Republic
- Gonzalo Sánchez de Lozada (born 1930), Bolivian president
- Iris Sanchez, American politician
- Linda Sánchez (born 1969), American member of Congress
- Loretta Sanchez (born 1960), American member of Congress
- María Isabel Sánchez Torregrosa (born 1979), Spanish member of Congress
- Milaxy Yanet Sánchez Armas (born 1972), Cuban politician
- Óscar Arias Sánchez (born 1940), Costa Rican president and Nobel Peace Prize winner
- Pedro Sánchez (born 1972), Prime Minister of Spain
- Pedro C. Sanchez (1925–1987), Guamanian politician
- Roberto Sánchez Vilella (1913–1997), former Governor of Puerto Rico

=== Sports ===
==== General ====
- Alicia Sánchez (born 1948), Peruvian volleyball player
- Anahí Ester Sánchez (born 1991), Argentine boxer
- Angélica Sánchez (born 1975), Mexican long-distance runner
- Bertha Sánchez (born 1978), Colombian long-distance runner
- Clara Sanchez (cyclist) (born 1983), French professional track cyclist
- Cristhian Cruz Sánchez (born 1992), Peruvian chess grandmaster
- Dani Sánchez (billiards player) (born 1974), Catalan carom billiards player
- Diego Sanchez (born 1981), American mixed martial artist
- Félix Sánchez (born 1977), Dominican-American athlete
- Fernando Fernández Sánchez (born 1990), Peruvian chess master
- Francisco Camino Sánchez (1940–2024), Spanish bullfighter
- Jorge Sánchez (basketball) (born 1991), American wheelchair basketball player
- Laura Sánchez (diver) (born 1985), Mexican diver
- Mark Sanchez (born 1986), NFL Quarterback
- Melitón Sánchez Rivas (1934–2026), Panamanian finance manager and sports official
- Michael Sánchez (born 1986), Cuban volleyball player
- Nick Sanchez (born 2001), American NASCAR driver
- Pepe Sánchez (born 1977), Argentine professional basketball player
- Philippe Sanchez (born 1969), French cross country skier
- Ricardo Sánchez (born 1971), Spanish water polo player
- Rosario Sánchez (born 1973), Mexican race walker
- Samuel Sánchez (born 1978), Spanish road bicycle racer
- Sara Sánchez (born 1997), Spanish motorcycle racer
- Santiago Martín Sánchez (born 1938), "El Viti", Spanish bullfighter
- Yadier Sánchez (born 1987), Cuban volleyball player

==== Baseball ====
- Ali Sánchez (born 1997), Venezuelan professional baseball player
- Aníbal Sánchez (born 1984), Venezuelan professional baseball player
- Cristopher Sánchez (born 1996), Dominican professional baseball player
- Freddy Sanchez (born 1977), American former professional baseball player
- Gaby Sánchez (born 1983), American former professional baseball player
- Gary Sanchez (born 1992), Dominican professional baseball player
- Héctor Sánchez (baseball) (born 1989), Venezuelan professional baseball player
- Joel Sanchez (baseball), American college baseball coach
- Jonathan Sánchez (born 1982), Puerto Rican professional baseball player
- Rómulo Sánchez (born 1984), Venezuelan former professional baseball player
- Sixto Sánchez (born 1998), Dominican professional baseball player

==== Association football (soccer) ====
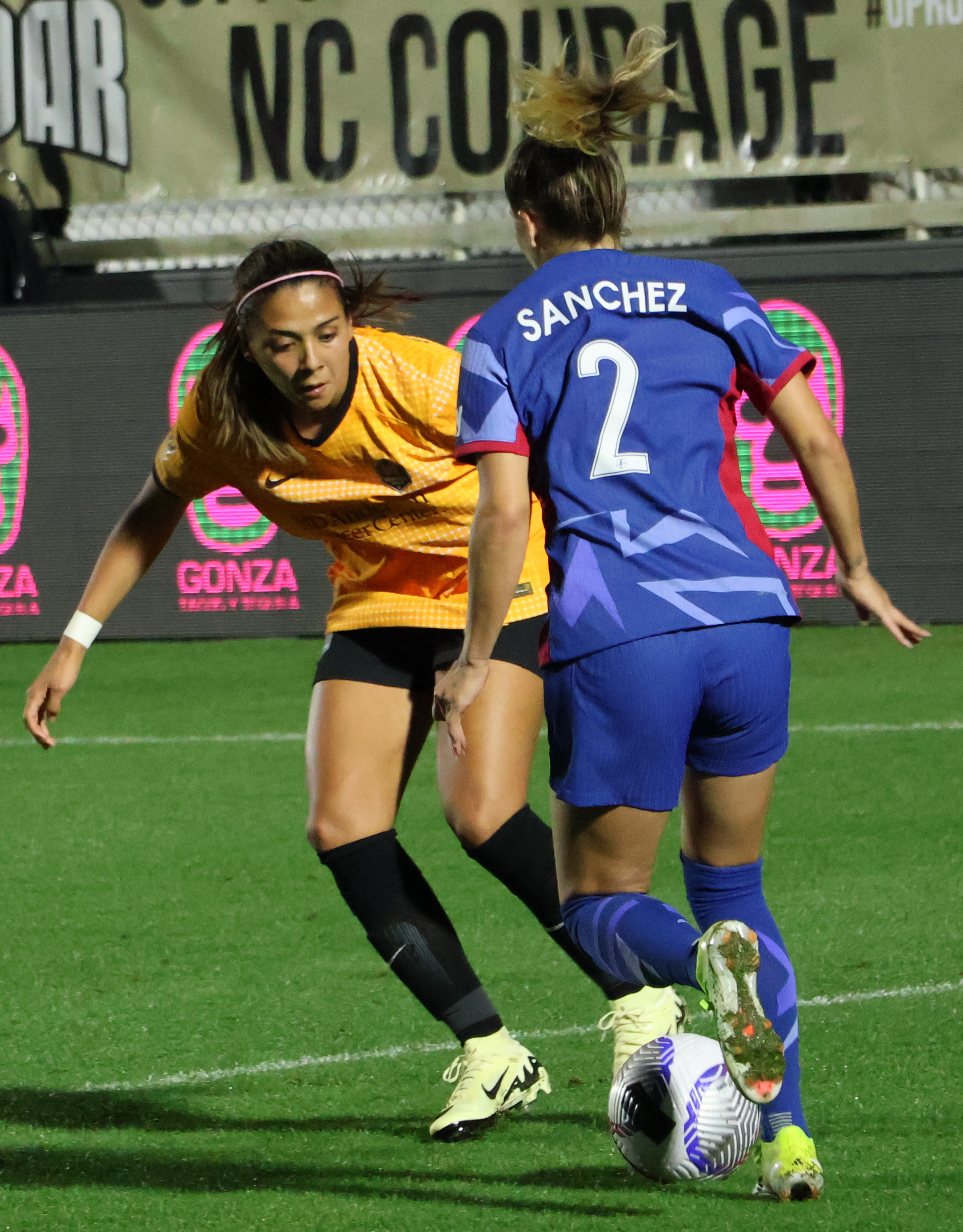
Professional footballers María Sánchez and Ashley Sanchez

- Alexis Sánchez (born 1988), Chilean footballer for Inter Milan and Chile national football team
- Ángel Sánchez (referee) (born 1957), Argentine football referee
- Ashley Sanchez (born 1999), American soccer player
- Christophe Sanchez (born 1972), French football player
- Cooper Sanchez (born 2008), American soccer player
- Daniel Sanchez (born 1953), French former football striker
- Davinson Sánchez (born 1996), Colombian footballer
- Dennis Sanchez, American soccer coach
- Eustorgio Sánchez (born 1959), Venezuelan footballer
- Hugo Sánchez (born 1958), Mexican football player
- Jorge Sánchez (born 1997), Mexican football player
- Lawrie Sanchez (born 1959), British football manager and former player
- Lupe Sanchez (1961–2025), American football player
- María Sánchez (footballer) (born 1996), Mexican footballer
- Onésimo Sánchez (born 1968), Spanish football player and manager
- Oscar Enrique Sánchez (1955–2019), Guatemalan soccer player
- Oswaldo Sánchez (born 1973), Mexican soccer player
- Ricard Sánchez (born 2000), Spanish footballer
- Ricardo Sánchez (footballer) (born 1982), Mexican footballer
- Robert Sánchez (born 1997), Spanish footballer
- Roberto Sánchez (footballer) (born 1989), Spanish footballer
- Víctor Sánchez (footballer, born 1976), Spanish footballer and manager
- Víctor Sánchez (footballer, born 1987), Spanish footballer
- Victoriano Sánchez Arminio (1942–2023), Spanish football referee
- Wellington Sánchez (born 1974), Ecuadorian football player

==== Gridiron football ====
- Davis Sanchez (born 1974), American football player
- Devin Sanchez (born 2006), American football player
- Mark Sanchez (born 1986), American football player
- Rigoberto Sanchez (born 1994), American football player
- Zack Sanchez (born 1993), American football player

==== Tennis ====
- A set of Spanish siblings who became prominent professional players:
  - Emilio Sánchez (born 1965), older brother
  - Javier Sánchez (born 1968), younger brother
  - Arantxa Sánchez Vicario (born 1972), younger sister and the most prominent of the group
- José Antonio Sánchez-de Luna (born 1984), Spanish tennis player
- Manuel Sánchez (born 1991), Mexican tennis player
- María José Martínez Sánchez (born 1982), Spanish tennis player
- María Sánchez Lorenzo (born 1977), Spanish tennis player
- Nicolás Almagro Sanchez Rolle (born 1985), Spanish tennis player
- Olivia Sanchez (born 1982), French tennis player

=== Catholics Named Sanchez ===
==== Saints Named Sanchez ====
Sanchez is derived from Latin sanctus (“holy”) and ez (“of”/“son”).

- Sancius, Sanctius, Sancho Lay Catholic Martyred in 851
- Saint Teresa of Avila
- José Sánchez del Río
- Jenaro Sánchez Delgadillo

==== Clergy Named Sanchez ====
- Paul Robert Sanchez (born 1946), Auxiliary Bishop of Brooklyn, and the Titular Bishop of Coeliana

=== Other people ===
- Josefa Joaquina Sánchez, Venezuelan embroiderer and independence heroine (1765-1813)
- Melissa E. Sanchez, scholar of English literature
- Miguel Dongil y Sánchez (born 1987), Spanish historian
- Victoriano Sánchez Barcáiztegui (1826–1875), Spanish naval officer and hero
- Shyyell Diamond Sanchez-McCray (died 2026), American drag performer and activist

=== Fictional characters ===
- Franz Sanchez, main criminal in the James Bond movie Licence to Kill
- Rick Sanchez, titular character of Rick and Morty
- Paulina Sanchez, a recurring character from Danny Phantom
- Shakey Sanchez, a character from The Muppets
- Manalo Sánchez, main protagonist from the movie The Book of Life
- Todd Sanchez, secondary character from the series "BoJack Horseman"

It may also appear as a second (maternal) surname in Spanish speaking countries:

- Penélope Cruz, full name Penélope Cruz Sánchez, Spanish actress
- Claudio Suárez, full name Claudio Suárez Sánchez, Mexican former footballer
