= Octavio Milego =

Spanish referee and sports leader

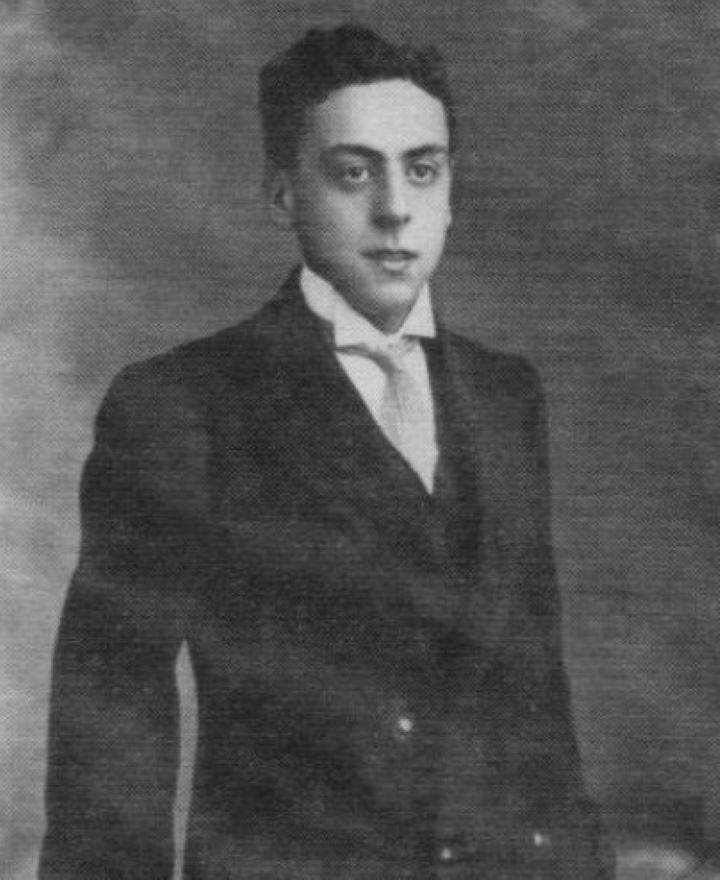
- Milego in the mid-1910s

Personal information
- Birth name: Octavio Augusto Milego Díaz
- Date of birth: 17 April 1893
- Place of birth: Toledo, Spain
- Date of death: 24 December 1982 (aged 89)
- Place of death: Valencia, Spain
- Position: Forward

Senior career*
Years	Team	Apps	(Gls)
1912–1919	Club Deportivo Español		
1st President of Valencia CF
In office 18 March 1919 – March 1922
Succeeded by	Alfredo Aigües
1st President of Valencian College of Football Referees
Incumbent
Assumed office March 1922
Vice-president of Valencia CF
In office 1973–1975
- * Club domestic league appearances and goals

Octavio Augusto Milego Díaz (17 April 1893 – 24 December 1982) was a Spanish referee and sports leader who served as the 1st president of Valencia CF between 1919 and 1922.

== Sporting career ==
=== Early career ===
Born in Toledo on 17 April 1893, Octavio Augusto Milego lived in Valencia from the age of five. He was introduced to the sport of football during the Regional Exhibition that took place in Valencia between 22 May and 31 July 1909, which included the first major football tournament in the city, contested by the likes of FC Barcelona, Sociedad Gimnástica, and Club Valencia. After the exhibition, the 16-year-old began playing the sport, which was embraced by some local clubs, such as Gimnástico and Levante, and a few years later he founded Club Deportivo Español, where he played as a forward. This club was dissolved in 1919 following the death of one of its players, the 21-year-old Luis Bonora, who suffered a severe leg fracture during a collision with an opponent in a friendly match in Elche. The injury became complicated on his return journey to Valencia, and he died shortly after reaching home.

The death of his teammate deeply affected Milego, who gave up football and went to Madrid to take the exams for a literature professorship at the School of Commerce. There, his passion for football was reignited when he attended a match between Real Madrid and Sociedad Gimnástica. Upon returning to Valencia with his newly earned position, he gathered six former teammates from his old club Español, as well as players from other short-lived Valencia clubs, Sagunto and Rat Penat, and began a series of meetings at the now-iconic Bar Torino, located on what is today Calle Barcelonina, near Plaza del Ayuntamiento. There he founded a new football club that would carry the city's name: Valencia Football Club, whose founding act took place on 5 March 1919.

=== Presidency of Valencia CF ===
Two weeks later, on 18 March, the club's board was elected, with Milego being named as the club's first-ever president after winning a coin toss against Gonzalo Medina. In its first years, Valencia lacked a playing field, so its early matches took place on a vacant plot of land in the Algirós neighborhood, positioned between the Aragón station and the Guardia Civil barracks. Eventually, the club secured a lease for this area, renting it for one hundred pesetas, with the contract being signed by Milego and Medina, both of whom poured immense effort into making the project a reality, sacrificing not only financial resources from their own pocket, but also their free time, work obligations, and even family commitments, with Medina contributing as far as 25,000 pesetas, which he had originally saved for his future wedding. The official inauguration of the stadium took place on 7 December 1919, with a match against Castalia from Castellón, which ended in a scoreless draw, so a rematch was held two days later, in which Valencia claimed a 1–0 victory thanks to a goal from Eduardo Cubells, who was making his debut, and who went on to become one of the club's greats.

Throughout its first season, Milego concentrated on increasing the club's membership and expanding its fan base, succeeding in doing so partly thanks to Cubells and Montes, who further cemented the team's growing reputation and popularity at the regional level. Initially, the club operated at Bar Torino, where the board of directors was restructured on 16 October 1919, but in the following year, its headquarters were relocated to 7 Calle Barcelonina, not too far from Bar Torino.

=== Refereeing career ===
Milego' later became a referee, officiating several matches in the Valencia Regional Championship, including from his own club. In March 1922, he decided to step down from the presidency of Valencia in order to, together with Medina and Ramón Leonarte, establish the Valencian College of Football Referees, serving as its first president. Under his leadership, Valencia played a total of 89 matches, winning 52, drawing 12, and losing 25. He was a referee in the 1928 Copa del Rey.

Despite leaving the club, his devotion to Valencia FC never wavered, witnessing its move to the Mestalla Stadium as well as its rise to prominence on both national and European stages. After retiring from refereeing, he remained involved with the club, serving as vice president under Francisco Ros Casares from 1973 to 1975.

== Death and legacy ==
Milego died in Valencia on 24 December 1982 at the age of 89, in his home on Joaquín Costa Street.

In March 2019, Valencia held a tribute to the founders of the club, which involved the son and great-granddaughter of Milego.
