= Enrique Molina =

Enrique Molina may refer to:

- Enrique Molina (footballer) (1904–1943), Spanish footballer
- Enrique Molina (actor) (1943–2021), Cuban actor
- Enrique Molina (cyclist), Argentine Olympic cyclist
- Enrique Molina (runner) (born 1968), Spanish middle and long distance runner
- Enrique Molina Pico (1938–2025), Argentine naval officer
