= Enrique Molina (footballer) =

Spanish footballer

Personal information
- Full name: Enrique Molina Soler
- Date of birth: 4 May 1904
- Place of birth: Russafa, Valencia, Spain
- Date of death: 15 July 1943 (aged 39)
- Place of death: Kommunar, Leningrad, Russia
- Position: Midfielder

Senior career*
Years	Team	Apps	(Gls)
1920–1922	Unión Levantina		
1922–1924	Gimnástico FC		
1925–1927	Valencia CF		

International career
1923	Valencian Community	1	(0)
1933	Spain B	1	(0)
- * Club domestic league appearances and goals

Enrique Molina Soler (4 May 1904 – 15 July 1943) was a Spanish footballer who played as a midfielder for Valencia CF. Apart from football, he also played Basque pelota in Valencia, and was one of the organizers of the Volta a Peu del Mercantil Valenciano.

== Early life ==
Enrique Molina was born on 4 May 1904 in the Russafa neighborhood, which at that time had just been annexed to the city of Valencia, into a conservative and deeply Catholic family. It was a small district surrounded by orchards, in which his family worked and in which he began to play football, a sport that was starting to enjoy some success in the city of Valencia.

== Club career ==
=== Early career ===
From a very young age he stood out as an athlete and for his physical form, so at the age of 16, he joined the ranks of the now-extinct Unión Levantina. He remained there for two seasons, until 1922, when he joined Gimnástico FC, where he played alongside the likes of Silvino and Alfredo Arróniz. While there, he became the most notable midfielder in the city, standing out for his bravery on the field of play and his extraordinary ability to recover balls in the center of the field, pushing the team towards the attack with an energy never seen in those times.

=== Valencia CF ===
In the summer of 1924, Molina was signed by Valencia CF, which meant greatly weakening its eternal rival, and in fact, they won the following three Regional Championships, with Molina playing a crucial role in those titles. In his first year, however, his performances were heavily affected by an illness, but he was at his best in the next nine, displaying great pride and consistency that was only interrupted in 1931 due to a knee injury and the enormous impact caused by the death of his wife, whom he had married only a year before. Molina became one of the first great players in the club's history, as he remained in the team for ten seasons, experiencing the first years of the club's professionalization in 1926, the debut in both the Copa del Rey and La Liga in its inaugural season in 1929, and the first promotion to the First Division in 1931, retiring in 1934, shortly before the outbreak of the Spanish Civil War in 1936. Together with Cirilo Amorós and Enrique Salvador, Molina formed what was known as the "glorious media", which achieved the first feats in national football. In 1929, with an economic crisis at the club, he agreed to reduce the fee and calmed down an attempted rebellion by the footballers against the coach.

Molina was a very temperamental man; for instance, during his time as a referee, he assaulted a Correspondencia journalist. On another occasion, during a match in Torrero against Iberia, he was attacked with an umbrella by a spectator, so Molina, without flinching, snatched his own from a spectator and replied in the same way, throwing the fan out of the stadium. He once even drove his car into the Mestalla Stadium to rescue a referee who was being threatened by the stands. He was also selfless enough to accept a salary reduction from his board.

Admired by critics and caricaturists, Molina received thunderous ovations not only at Mestalla, but also in rival stadiums, notably in his farewell match in a League fixture in Vitoria-Gasteiz, when the entire audience at the Mendizorrotza stood up and paid a resounding tribute to him. In total, he played 323 games with the Valencia club.

== International career ==
As a Valencia player, Molina was eligible to play for the Valencian national team, and together with Eduardo Cubells, Montes, and Rino Costa, he was a member of the squad that participated in the 1923–24 Prince of Asturias Cup, an inter-regional competition organized by the RFEF, being knocked out in the quarter-finals by Andalusia (2–3).

Molina was the subject of a tribute match between Valencia and the Spain national team in the Mestalla Stadium on 30 April 1933, a team that he was permanently called up to but never made his debut. His only international cap came with the Spain B team, in a 29 May 1927 friendly match against Portugal A side held at the Metropolitano, assisting in a 2–0 win.

== Later life and death ==
When he retired, Molina used his player savings to start a small industrial business.

He was Falangist before the outbreak of the Civil War, three of his priestly ordained brothers were shot by alleged communist militiamen. This fueled his resentment as part of a parapolice group that pursued communists during the last months of the War and especially after the conflict ended; some accused him of "having washed the blood of his brothers with more blood in the rearguard". Filled with hatred towards Bolshevik socialism, he enrolled in the Blue Division as a volunteer, a militia that moved from Spain to provide support to the Army of Nazi Germany in the fight against the Soviet Union during the Second World War. He died after being attacked on 15 July 1943 by cannon fire while transporting two Nazi Germany drivers on a motorcycle with a sidecar during the Siege of Leningrad. The chronicles of the time relate that "he was hit by a shell and the shrapnel shattered his skull". He was interred in the Mestelevo cemetery.

Molina was not the only professional Spanish football player who joined the Blue Division and fought for Germany in the Soviet Union: Ramón Herrera (Sporting de Gijón and Atlético Madrid). Herrera returned to Spain.

== Honours ==
Valencia CF

Valencia Championship:

- Winners (7) 1925, 1926, 1927, 1931, 1932, 1933, and 1924
