= Joel Sánchez =

Joel Sánchez is the name of:

- Joel Sánchez (racewalker)
- Joel Sánchez (Mexican footballer)
- Joel Sánchez (Peruvian footballer)
- Joel Sanchez (baseball), American college baseball coach
