= Gonzalo Medina =

Spanish referee and sports leader

- Born: Gonzalo Medina Pernás; Spain
- Citizenship: Spanish
- Occupation(s): Football referee and Sportsperson
- Known for: Founder of Valencia CF

Gonzalo Medina Pernás was a Spanish football referee. Although little has been recorded of his life, he was one of the most important footballers in the amateur beginnings of Valencia CF, being among the founders of the club in 1919, and although he lost the honor of being its first president on a coin toss, he then served as one of its first patrons, playing a crucial role in helping Valencia get its first stadium Campo de Algirós.

== Sporting career ==
=== Valencia CF ===
Little is known about his life; on 26 February 1919, Medina wrote the first known document in the history of Valencia CF, which was published in the now defunct local newspaper La Correspondencia de Valencia under the pseudonym Back, where he simply stated that "a new club is being formed, which will bear the name Valencia FBC". A few days later, on 1 March, Medina, together with Octavio Milego, Julio Gascó, and a few others, founded Valencia Football Club at the now-iconic Bar Torino, located on what is today Calle Barcelonina, near Plaza del Ayuntamiento. The founding team then drew up the club's first statutes, which were delivered to the Civil Government and the Registry of Companies on 5 March, and while waiting for its approval, a constituent commission was appointed, presided by Medina. Two weeks later, on 18 March, the statutes were approved and the club's board was subsequently elected, and the honor of being its first president came down to a coin toss between Milego and Medina, which was won by the former, while the latter went on to head the department of the festivities commission.

A few months later, in late 1919, Valencia secured a lease for a vacant plot of land in the Algirós neighborhood, renting it for one hundred pesetas, with the contract being signed by Milego and Medina, both of whom poured immense effort into making the project a reality, sacrificing not only financial resources from their own pocket, but also their free time, work obligations, and even family commitments, with Medina even contributing 25,000 pesetas, which he had originally saved for his future wedding, to fence off the stadium. The official inauguration of the stadium took place on 7 December 1919, with a match against Castalia from Castellón, which ended in a scoreless draw, so a rematch was held two days later, in which Valencia claimed a 1–0 victory thanks to a goal from debutant Eduardo Cubells, who went on to become one of the club's greats.

Throughout its first season, Milego concentrated on increasing the club's membership and expanding its fan base, succeeding in doing so partly thanks to Cubells and Montes, who further cemented the team's growing reputation and popularity at the regional level. Initially, the club operated at Bar Torino, where the board of directors was restructured on 16 October 1919, but in the following year, its headquarters were relocated to 7 Calle Barcelonina, not too far from Bar Torino.

=== Refereeing career ===
Just like Milego, Medina went on to become a referee, officiating several matches in the Valencia Regional Championship in the mid-1920s, including from his own club. In March 1922, he decided to step down from Valencia's board in order to, together with Milego and Ramón Leonarte, establish the Valencian College of Football Referees.

== Legacy ==
On 18 March 2017, on the 98th anniversary of the club's foundation, the VCF Foundation brought together three of his descendants: his grandson Guillermo Medina, his great-grandson Jacinto García, and his great-great-grandson of the same name.
