= Alfredo Arróniz =

Spanish footballer (1902–1976)

Personal information
- Full name: Alfredo Arróniz Vidal
- Date of birth: 15 September 1902
- Place of birth: Murcia, Spain
- Date of death: 15 May 1976 (aged 73)
- Height: 1.81 m (5 ft 11 in)
- Positions: Forward; midfielder

Youth career
- 1915–1919: Gimnástico

Senior career*
Years	Team	Apps	(Gls)
1919–1924	Gimnástico		
1924–1925	Espanyol		
1925–1926	Valencia		
1926–1928	Gimnástico		
1928–1932	Castellón		
1932–1939	Gimnástico		
1934–1935	Sport Club de La Plana		
- * Club domestic league appearances and goals

Alfredo Arróniz Vidal (15 September 1902 – 15 May 1976) was a Spanish footballer who played as a Forward and midfielder for Valencia CF and CD Castellón.

== Playing career ==
Alfredo Arróniz was born on 15 September 1902 in Murcia, but lived most of his life in Valencia, where he began playing football in the youth ranks of Gimnástico FC in 1915, aged 13. Initially, he played as a forward, becoming one of the best scorers in the region. Arróniz was also noted for his versatility, since he often played in various positions, either because of "the specific needs of each match", or simply to cover emergencies, doing so always remarkably. Together with Silvino and Enrique Molina, Arróniz played a crucial role in the Gimnástico team that won the 1923–24 Valencia Championship, which earned a move to Espanyol, where he played in the 1924–25 season.

His good performance eventually drew the attention of Valencia CF, who signed him in the summer of 1925, making his debut on 19 July against Natación de Alicante. In his first season at the club, he played 32 games, scored 3 goals and won his second Valencia Championship, which he won again in his second and last campaign with the club. While at Valencia, he showed himself as a player of determination and courage, sometimes more concerned with the fight with the opponent than with finishing the plays. The presence of Arturo Montesinos moved him to the right wing, where he had to play as a winger without being able to show off his best qualities. On 1 May 1926, he played a friendly match against Real Madrid, scoring once to help his side to an epic 4–3 victory.

In the summer of 1926, after only one season at Valencia, he returned to Gimnástico; on his first visit to Mestalla Stadium on 8 December 1927, he provided a spectacular assist to Silvino for his side's second goal in an eventual 2–4 loss, but at the end of the match he was sent off along with Francisco Reyes because he "had harassed Lluch in a bad way, who had fallen to the ground; the referee finally put the matter to rest by inviting them to end the discussion off the field". Then he went to Castellón de la Plana, where he settled permanently and married in December 1929, becoming one of the most important players of the club, winning two Regional Championships in 1929 and 1930. He returned to Mestalla on several occasions, always starring in great and controversial performances.

In late 1931, he returned to Gimnástico, staying loyal to the club for eight years, until the outbreak of the Spanish Civil War in 1939. During this period, he played 3 matches for Sport Club de La Plana in the 1934–35 season.

== Death ==
Arróniz died on 15 May 1976, at the age of 73.

== Honours ==
Gimnástico

- Valencia Championship:
  - Champions (1):: 1924

Valencia

- Valencia Championship:
  - Champions (2): 1926 and 1927

Castellón

- Valencia Championship:
  - Champions (2): 1929 and 1930
