= Bruno Henrique =

Bruno Henrique may refer to:

- Bruno Henrique (footballer, born 1988) (Bruno Henrique da Silva Souza), a Brazilian footballer who plays as a central defender
- Bruno Henrique (footballer, born 1989) (Bruno Henrique Corsini), a Brazilian footballer who plays as a central midfielder
- Bruno Henrique (footballer, born 1990) (Bruno Henrique Pinto), a Brazilian footballer who plays as a forward
- Bruno Henrique (footballer, born 1992) (Bruno Henrique de Sousa), a Brazilian footballer who plays as a forward
- Bruno Henrique Fortunato Aguiar (born 1986), a Brazilian footballer who plays as a central defender
- Bruno Henrique Lopes (born 1995), a Brazilian footballer who plays as a forward
- Bruno Henrique Marques Torres (born 1999), a Brazilian footballer who plays as a forward
- Bruno Henrique Turco (born 1991), a Brazilian footballer who plays as a defensive midfielder
