= J. T. Dorsey =

American soccer player

J.T. Dorsey
Personal information
- Full name: Julian Dorsey
- Date of birth: August 29, 1975 (age 51)
- Place of birth: Coatesville, Pennsylvania, United States
- Height: 6 ft 1 in (1.85 m)
- Position: Defender

Youth career
- 1993–1996: Loyola Greyhounds

Senior career*
Years	Team	Apps	(Gls)
1997	Delaware Wizards		
1998	Hershey Wildcats	16	(0)
2001	Hershey Wildcats	2	(0)
2001–2002	Reading Rage	25	(2)
2002	Connecticut Wolves	6	(0)
2003	Reading Rage	1	(0)
2004–2006	Harrisburg City Islanders	46	(12)
- * Club domestic league appearances and goals as of December 5, 2006

Julian "J.T." Dorsey, born August 29, 1975, in Coatesville, Pennsylvania, is a U.S. soccer defender who last played for the USL Second Division side Harrisburg City Islanders.

Dorsey attended Loyola University Maryland. On May 4, 2004, he signed with the Harrisburg City Islanders.

He currently runs the J.T. Dorsey foundation.
