= Eric Puls =

American soccer player and coach

Personal information
- Date of birth: July 4, 1971 (age 55)
- Place of birth: United States
- Height: 6 ft 0 in (1.83 m)
- Position: Midfielder

College career
Years	Team	Apps	(Gls)
1989–1992	Syracuse Orange		

Senior career*
Years	Team	Apps	(Gls)
1992	SV Darmstadt		
1992–1994	Rot-Weiss Waldorf		
1995	St. Louis Knights		
1996–2003	Reading Rage		(24)

Managerial career
- 2001–2002: Reading Rage
- 2013–2014: Pennsylvania Roar
- * Club domestic league appearances and goals

Eric Puls (born July 4, 1971) is an American retired soccer midfielder who played two seasons in the German third division and nine in the USISL. He was the head coach of the Reading Rage in 2001 and 2002.

== Youth ==
Puls grew up in St. Louis, Missouri where he was a member of the 1988 Christian Brothers College High School Missouri State championship soccer team. That year, he was also selected as an All State soccer player. He then attended Syracuse University, playing on the men's soccer team from 1989 to 1992. Puls holds the all-time record for most points as a freshman. In addition to his school teams, Puls also played club soccer with the Busch Soccer Club until his graduation from High School. He then played for the Scott Gallagher cup.

== Professional ==
Following college, Puls moved to Germany to pursue a professional career. He signed with SV Darmstadt 98 in the second Bundesliga before moving to Rot-Weiß Waldorf of the Regionalliga where he played from 1992 to 1994. In 1995, he returned to St. Louis and signed with the St. Louis Knights in the USISL. In February 1996, the Colorado Rapids selected Puls in the 12th round (112th overall) of the 1996 MLS Inaugural Player Draft. On March 25, 1996, the Rapids released Puls during a pre-season roster reduction. He then moved to the Reading Rage where he played from 1996 to 2003. He was 1999, 2000 and 2003 All League.

== Coaching ==
In 2001, Puls became a player-coach with the Reading Rage. He held this position through the 2002 season. In 2003, he founded F.C. Revolution, a youth club in Wyomissing, Pennsylvania. He played with the F.C. Reading Revolution men's team in the NPSL until 2011 in which he retired from playing soccer. Now, he spends his time as a coach and club president for Reading Rage. He has "revolutionized" soccer by introducing the "Funnel Offense". The Funnel Offense is a variation of the 4–3–3. The layout is shaped like a triangle where the 3 forwards form a point at the head of the offense. This revelatory game strategy has taken teams to a nationally ranked status.
