= Pedro Díaz =

Pedro Díaz may refer to:

- Pedro Díaz de Tenorio (died 1399), archbishop of Toledo
- Pedro Díaz (missionary) (1546–1618), Spanish missionary
- Pedro Díaz de Durana (ca. 1658 – ca. 1718), Roman Catholic prelate, bishop of Paraguay
- Pedro Díaz de Vivar y González de Buendía (1740–1820), Spanish soldier and colonial official
- Pedro Díaz Colodrero (1787–1859), Argentine politician, participated in drafting the Argentine Constitution of 1853
- Pedro Díaz Molina (1850–1924), Cuban army general
- Pedro Antonio Díaz (1852–1919), acting president of Panama in 1918
- Pedro Díaz (baseball), (born 1910), Cuban professional baseball player
- Pedro Diaz (boxing) (born 1962), boxing trainer
- Pedro Díaz Lobato (born 1973), Spanish cyclist
- Pedro Díaz (footballer, born 1977), Spanish footballer and manager
- Pedro Díaz (footballer, born 1998), Spanish footballer

== See also ==
- Pedro Dias (disambiguation)
