= Javier Sánchez =

Javier Sánchez may refer to:

- Javier Sánchez (architect) (fl. 1990s–2000s), Mexican architect and developer
- Javier Sánchez (footballer, born 1947) (1947–2025), Mexican football defender
- Javier Sánchez (tennis) (born 1968), former professional tennis player from Spain
- Javier Sánchez (water polo) (born 1975), Spanish water polo player
- Javier Sánchez Broto (born 1971), former professional footballer from Spain
- Javier Sánchez Serna (born 1985), Spanish politician
- Javi Sánchez (footballer) (born 1997), Spanish footballer
- Javi Sánchez (futsal player) (born 1971), Spanish futsal player

== See also ==
- Sánchez (surname)
