= Campo de Algirós =

Football stadium in Valencia (1919–1923)

- Interactive map of Campo de Algirós
- Location: Valencia, Spain
- Capacity: 5.000

Construction
- Opened: 7 December 1919
- Demolished: 1923

Tenant
- Valencia CF (1919–1923)

The Campo de Algirós was a football stadium in the city of Valencia, Spain, located in the neighborhood of Algirós. It served as the first home ground of Valencia CF between 1919 and 1923.

== History ==
=== Origins ===
In its first years, Valencia lacked a playing field, so the club played its first matches on a vacant plot of land in the Algirós neighborhood, positioned between the Aragón station and the Guardia Civil barracks of the Algirós road (now non-existent), which measures 91 x 47 meters and which was not fenced and whose earth only lightly covered the gravel. Eventually, Octavio Milego, the first president of the club, and Gonzalo Medina, secured a lease for this area from its owner, Eugenio Miquel, for 100 pesetas per month.

Once leased, however, the Valencian Football Federation did not allow matches to be played there until it was fenced, so Medina made an anonymous donation worth 25,000 pesetas, an amount that he had originally saved for his wedding that he had to postpone, and this donation was then used to prepare and fence the land as well as build the lockers and other maintenance issues. Its first stands could accommodate a maximum of 5,000 fans, but it soon became too small and was expanded to 8,000.

=== Golden years ===
The official inauguration of the stadium took place on 7 December 1919, with a match against Castalia from Castellón, which ended in a scoreless draw, so a rematch was held two days later, in which Valencia claimed a 1–0 victory thanks to a goal from Eduardo Cubells, who was making his debut, and who went on to become one of the club's greats. Little by little, the local population began going to Algirós and gathering on the stadium to watch this curious sport, which soon gained followers among the local youth, with tickets costing 25 cents, and its proceedings soon became enough to cover the expenses. Algirós thus played a crucial role in helping Valencia establish itself as the most dominant team in its region within just a few years of its foundation.

On 19 November 1922, the Algirós hosted the official debut of the Valencian football team, which came against the South in the quarter-finals of the 1922–23 Prince of Asturias Cup, an official tournament organised by RFEF; Valencia lost 1–2, with Cubells being the author of the first goal in the history of the team.

In 1923, Valencia won its first regional championship, which qualified them for the 1923 Copa del Rey for the first time, and thus, on 25 march of that year, Algirós hosted its first Copa del Rey match in the quarterfinals between Valencia and Sporting Gijón, which ended in a 1–0 local victory thanks to a late goal from Montes; however, Algirós was unable to repeat the feat in the semifinals because Valencia then lost to Gijón 6–1 in the second leg.

=== Decline and collapse ===
Algirós kept hosting the club's matches until 1923, when the club started playing at the Mestalla Stadium.

== Legacy ==
At the initiative of the group Últimes Vesprades a Mestalla, a plaque was placed on the site where Algirós stood between 1919 and 1923, with Guillermo Medina, grandson of Gonzalo Medina, dedicating some emotional words at the event.
