= Enrique Sanchez =

Enrique Sanchez or Enrique Sánchez may refer to:

- Enrique Sánchez (athlete) (1909–?), Mexican sprinter
- Enrique Sánchez (boxer) (born 1972), Mexican boxer
- Enrique Sanchez (politician) (born 1996), American politician from Rhode Island
- Enrique Sánchez Abulí (born 1945), Spanish comics author
- Enrique Sánchez Carrasco (1928–2001), Spanish politician and teacher
- Quique Sánchez Flores (Enrique Sánchez Flores, born 1965), Spanish football manager and former player
- Enrique Sánchez-Guijo, Spanish paralympic athlete
- Enrique Sánchez Lansch (born 1963), Spanish-German film director and screenwriter
- Enrique Sánchez de León (1934–2025), Spanish politician
- Enrique Sánchez Martínez (born 1960), Mexican clergyman
