= Luis Sánchez =

Luis Sánchez may refer to:

- Luis Sánchez (alpine skier) (born 1940), Spanish Olympic skier
- Luis Sánchez (baseball) (1953–2005), baseball player
- Luis Sánchez (basketball), Peruvian Olympic basketball player
- Luis Sánchez Betances (born 1947), Dominican attorney in Puerto Rico
- Luis Sánchez (Cuban footballer) (born 1952), Cuban footballer
- Luis Sánchez (Colombian footballer) (born 2000)
- Luis Sánchez Duque (born 1956), Spanish football manager
- Luis Sánchez Jiménez (born 1962), Mexican politician
- Luis Sánchez (Mexican footballer) (born 1988), Mexican footballer
- Luis Sánchez Morales (1867–1934), Puerto Rican politician
- Luis Sánchez Ossa (born 1988), Chilean politician
- Luis Sánchez de Tagle, 1st Marquis of Altamira (1642–1710), Spanish aristocrat
- Luis Alberto Sánchez (1900–1994), Peruvian lawyer
- Luis Ángel Sánchez (born 1993), Guatemalan racewalker
- Luis Augusto Sánchez (1917–1981), Colombian chess player
- Luis León Sánchez (born 1983), Spanish cyclist
- Luis Miguel Sánchez Cerro (1889–1933), Peruvian army officer
- Luis Rafael Sánchez (born 1936), Puerto Rican playwright
