= Carlos Sánchez =

Carlos Sánchez may refer to:

== Arts and religion ==
- Carlos Alberto Sánchez (born 1963), Roman Catholic Archbishop of Tucumán, Argentina
- Carlos Sanchez-Gutierrez (born 1964), Mexican composer and music teacher
- Carlos Sánchez (comedian) (1952–2021), Argentine comedian, actor and singer
- Carlos Sánchez (Colombian actor) (1935–2018), portrayed coffee-grower Juan Valdez

== Politics and law ==
- Carlos Sánchez Barrios (born 1957), Mexican politician from the state of Guerrero
- Carlos Sánchez Mejías (fl. 1930s), Chilean politician
- Carlos Sánchez Romero (1970–2025), Mexican politician from the state of Puebla
- Carlos Sánchez Mato (born 1970), Spanish politician and economist
- Carlos Sánchez Viamonte (1892–1972), Argentine jurist and politician, vice-presidential candidate in the 1958 Argentine general election
- Carlos Sánchez, Argentine Army sergeant convicted in 1996 of concealing evidence in the investigation into the 1994 murder of Omar Carrasco

== Science and technology ==
- Carlos Sánchez Magro (1944–1985), Spanish astrophysicist for whom the Telescopio Carlos Sánchez was named

== Sports ==
=== Association football (soccer) ===
- Carlos Sánchez (footballer, born 1978), Spanish football goalkeeper
- Carlos Sánchez (footballer, born 1980), Mexican football defender
- Carlos Sánchez (footballer, born 1984), Uruguayan football attacking midfielder for Peñarol
- Carlos Sánchez (footballer, born 1986), Colombian football defensive midfielder for San Lorenzo de Almagro
- Carlos Sánchez (football manager) (born 1989), Spanish football coach and scout
- Carlos Sánchez (footballer, born 1990), Honduran football defender for C.D.S. Vida
- Carlos Sánchez (footballer, born 2001), Spanish football right-back for Cartagena
- Carlos Sánchez (footballer, born 2002), Mexican football full-back for Pachuca

=== Other sports ===
- Carlos Silva Sánchez (born 1944), Chilean chess master
- Carlos Sánchez (water polo) (born 1952), Cuban Olympic water polo player
- Cárlos Sanchez (born 1984), ring name of professional wrestler Alex Koslov or Alex Sherman
- Carlos Sánchez (boxer) (born 1988), Ecuadorian boxer
- Carlos Sánchez (baseball) (born 1992), Venezuelan baseball player, better known as Yolmer Sánchez

== Fictional characters ==
- Carlos Sánchez, from the U.S. television series The Glades
