= SW Florida Adrenaline =

SWFL Adrenaline
- Full name: Southwest Florida Adrenaline
- Founded: 2012
- Dissolved: 2017
- Ground: Estero High School; Estero, Florida
- Capacity: 1,000
- Owner: Jeff Butzke
- League: Premier Development League
- 2016: 5th, Southeast Division; Playoffs: DNQ

SWFL Adrenaline was an American soccer club that competed in the Premier Development League, the fourth division of American soccer. The team represented the Naples–Marco Island metro area of Florida.

== History ==
The Adrenaline won their inaugural match 5–1 against Floridians FC on May 11, 2013. Xavier Silva, who also plays for the nearby Florida Gulf Coast University soccer team, scored the team's first-ever goal.

On May 21, 2013, head coach Mick Whitewood was forced to step down and was quickly replaced by John Robinson. The Adrenaline finished in seventh place of the Southeast division in its inaugural season.

In Jan 2015, Chris Cousins was hired as General Manager to the team, in a dual position that also meant he overlooked the college recruitment of the academy players. Cousins was the founder of the world's leading U.S. College Soccer Recruitment Service, Sports Recruiting USA, who were official partners with the club.

== Seasons ==
Year	Division	League	Reg. season	Playoffs	Open Cup
2013	4	USL PDL	7th, Southeast	Did not qualify	Did not qualify
2014	4	USL PDL	2nd, Southeast	Conference Semifinals	Did not qualify
2015	4	USL PDL	3rd, Southeast	Did not qualify	1st Round
2016	4	USL PDL	5th, Southeast	Did not qualify	Did not qualify
