= Dawyne Smith =

Jamaican footballer (born 1988)

Personal information
- Full name: Dawyne Ricky Smith
- Date of birth: 7 March 1988 (age 38)
- Place of birth: Kingston, Jamaica
- Height: 1.85 m (6 ft 1 in)
- Position: Forward

Team information
- Current team: UWI

Youth career
- 2008–2011: Bethel Wildcats

Senior career*
Years	Team	Apps	(Gls)
2009	Reading Rage	13	(3)
2012	Pittsburgh Riverhounds	10	(1)
2013	NJ-LUSO Rangers FC	2	(0)
2013	Tivoli Gardens		

International career
- Jamaica U17
- Jamaica U20
- * Club domestic league appearances and goals as of 21 July 2013

Dawyne Ricky Smith (born 7 March 1988) is a Jamaican footballer.

== Career ==
=== College and amateur ===
Smith spent all four years of his college career at Bethel University. In his four years at Bethel, Smith made 77 appearances and finished with 59 goals and 39 assists and was named to the All-American Team in 2011.

Smith also spent time with the Reading Rage during the 2009 season while a student at Bethel and Arantes Football Club in New York as well as the New York Cosmos U23 Team.

For his commitment, Smith was added to the line up for the Paul Scholes testimonial match against Manchester United and the New York Cosmos.

Smith, in his final semester of completing his master's was drafted by the New England Revolution with the 3rd pick in the Supplemental draft to become the first soccer athlete in Bethel's History to have been drafted by an MLS club. Still in school, Smith finished his master's and was signed by the Pittsburgh Riverhounds 2011 where he spent 2 seasons.

Following his move to Europe, Smith has plied his trade in Germany and in Asia before settling in life at UWI FC in the 2017/2018 RSPL season.

=== Professional ===
On 17 January 2012, Smith was drafted third overall in the 2012 MLS Supplemental Draft by the New England Revolution.

Smith joined USL Pro club Pittsburgh Riverhounds. On 18 May 2012, Smith made his debut for the Riverhounds and scored his first professional goal in a 1–1 draw against the Richmond Kickers. Smith was named to the USL Pro team of the week that same week.

Smith has been instrumental in the CopaNYC tournament for his team NYCJamaica and was named the tournament's top scorer in its inaugural year 2010 and then named the tournaments most outstanding player a year later. Smiths impressive form for the COPANYC led to his selection to play against Manchester City in 2010. Smith repaid his selection with a goal to level the game 1–1.

Seattle Sounders FC picked up Smith's MLS rights in the 2012 MLS Waiver Draft on 6 June 2012 as one of the brighter college prospects to fill a void the Sounders needed.

In 2013, Smith returned to Jamaica with Tivoli Gardens F.C. where they were placed second in the Flow Champions cup and then later won the Jackie Bell Knockout competition after a disappointing 5th-placed finish in the Red stripe premier league.
