= Reading United AC =

Reading United
- Full name: Reading United Athletic Club
- Founded: 1995; 31 years ago as Reading Rage
- Stadium: Alvernia University
- Owner: Berks Professional Sports
- Head coach: Casey Moore
- League: USL League Two
- 2024: 2nd, Mid Atlantic Division; Playoffs: DNQ
- Website: readingunitedac.com
Home colors

Reading United AC is an American soccer team based in Reading, Pennsylvania. Founded in 1995, the team plays in USL League Two, the fourth tier of the American Soccer Pyramid.

The club plays its home games at Alvernia University. The club's colors are white, black, gold, and navy blue. United formerly fielded a team in the Super-20 League, a league for players seventeen to twenty years of age under the United Soccer Leagues umbrella.

Prior to the 2010 season, the team was known as the Reading Rage. On December 21, 2009, the Rage organization announced its agreement with Major League Soccer's Philadelphia Union to become their official minor league affiliate, and re-branded as Reading United A.C. with immediate effect.

Reading United is one of only three teams in USL League Two history to reach consecutive league finals - reaching in 2018 and 2019.

More than 130 former players have progressed to professional soccer, earned international caps for their national teams, or been drafted by MLS clubs.

== History ==
The Reading-American Soccer Club was established in the early 1900s under the name of Germania Soccer Club by a group of German immigrant soccer players and soccer enthusiasts. On April 26, 1926 Germania merged with the Reading Liederkranz (Reading's German-American club), and the Sport Club legally became the Sports Division of the Reading Liederkranz.

Later, under the direction of Germania and Liederkranz members Werner Kraheck and Peter Weiss, the Reading Berks Junior Soccer League was born, providing a foundation for local youth soccer clubs to flourish. The Germania teams were the precursor to the now common “premier” teams. After the Germania program ended in the late 1970s/early 1980s, the premier teams became the Reading Berks Select program whereby each club could send several of their “top players” to participate in tournaments and training but then return them to their club teams. After several iterations, the Reading Berks Select teams became known as Reading Berks United, later RBU, and finally Berks Soccer Academy aka B.S.A. Rage.

Many people in the greater Reading area are surprised to learn that the Reading United A.C. (formerly Reading Rage) is the 2nd longest tenured minor league team in the area (behind the R-Phils). Berks Professional Sports introduced the Reading Rage minor league team 15 years ago with a squad that featured a great blend of local talent and “imported” stars. The Reading Rage would not have begun without the efforts of former Penn State All-American Archie Moylan. Archie was playing professional soccer and featured as a player and General Manager for the Philadelphia Freedom. Archie worked tirelessly to recruit an ownership team and staff. In 1996 his dream took the field. While a lot of the players, staff and even owners of the original team moved on, Archie's dream stayed alive. The Rage teams of the 1990s did well, with Archie leading the team to the playoffs in their 2nd season, and capturing a D3 Pro League (precursor to today's USL2) Mid-Atlantic Division Crown in 1997. Archie Moylan continued to build the Rage brand, and the team was rewarded for his management efforts by being named Franchise of the Year. In 1998 Archie further expanded his roles as he took over as head coach of the 3rd year program. The Rage teams of the 1990s featured a lot of local talent including former Wilson H.S. stars Ed Sep, Matt Wolf, Chris Arthur, and Drew Kauffman; Weiser stars Tom Auchenbach and Steve Thomas; and of course Fleetwood greats Keith Schlegel and former US Men's National Team member Troy Snyder. The team played at Fleetwood H.S. for two years prior to transitioning to Central Catholic Stadium in St. Lawrence, where they played for a number of years before moving to Albright College and finally at Exeter's Don Thomas Stadium.

Tragically, Archie was diagnosed with cancer and died in 2000. In recognition of Archie's efforts and accomplishments, the United Soccer Leagues has established The Archie Moylan Award to honor a member of the USL family who has exhibited outstanding humanitarian qualities or overcome extraordinary adversity in hopes to give back to the soccer community through their actions and deeds. Past winners include executive Marcie Laumann with the Hampton Roads Piranhas (W-League), player Todd Elkins for the Southern California Seahorses (PDL), and player, coach, and USL staff member, Stuart Bracher. Each of these individuals has exemplified the ability to not only overcome adversity but transform it into an opportunity to effectuate positive change by serving as an inspiration to others. This year's honoree was Betsy McAdams. McAdams died in June of brain cancer. She was an original employee of the Charleston Battery since its inception in 1993 and went on to serve in a number of roles including Director of Operations and Director of Finance & Business Administration. She was named Chief Operating Officer in May 2008. USL renamed the Key Grip Award to the Betsy McAdams award because she defined the behind the scenes employee.

Due to the loss of Archie, a string of losing years, and decreasing fan attendance, in 2004 the team transitioned from the Pro Soccer League (USL2) to the rapidly growing PDL. The pro-am PDL allowed focus on younger players and generally less overhead and costs for franchise operations. After some internal shuffling and under the stewardship of owner and general manager Jerry Wojton, the team regained in strength, with Jerry eventually landing seasoned English Club Crystal Palace's Academy Director Derek Broadley to coach the team in 2005. Derek brought his passion for player development and quickly reignited local interest in the team and league with his attractive style of play and confidence in his coaching methodologies. While Derek's team's hovered around .500, he returned the Rage teams to the winning side of things, posting a 7–5–4 2007 record. One of the players Derek introduced to the Reading Rage in 2007 was a central defender from Boston College, Brendan Burke. Derek left the Reading Rage in the fall of 2007 to take over the Bermuda National team position.

On January 13, 2011, Reading United saw four former players, including three from the 2010 roster, drafted at the 2011 MLS SuperDraft in Baltimore, Maryland. 2011 MLS Rookie of the Year C. J. Sapong was selected 10th overall by Sporting Kansas City, followed by Corey Hertzog who was selected 13th overall by New York Red Bulls. Levi Houapeu was selected in the third round by Philadelphia Union with the 41st pick overall. Former Reading Rage player, Zarek Valentin, was selected 4th overall by Chivas USA.

In 2012, three more alumni were selected in the 2012 MLS SuperDraft, held in Kansas City, MO. Andrew Wenger became the United's first alumnus to be selected with the #1 overall pick by the Montreal Impact. Defender Matt Hedges was selected soon after by FC Dallas with the #11 overall pick. For the second straight year, the Philadelphia Union picked a United alum, picking Raymon Gaddis in the 2nd round of the draft. Probable Generation Adidas signings Billy Schuler and Brian "Cobi" Span were likely first round picks, but chose to sign overseas rather than enter the MLS SuperDraft.

Four other former players were also selected during the 2012 MLS Supplemental Draft, including Dawyne Smith (#3 by the New England Revolution), Brian Ownby (#7 by the Houston Dynamo), Evans Frimpong (#9 by the Chicago Fire), and Christian Barreiro (#50 by the New York Red Bulls).

Just over a week after the Supplemental Draft (January 25, 2012), former keeper Jeremy Vuolo signed a professional contract with the New York Red Bulls, after spending his first professional season abroad with Finland's AC Oulu.

On December 28, 2013, Reading United announced that David Castellanos was chosen as the club's head coach for the 2014 season.

== Name, colors, and badge ==
The primary colors of Reading United A.C. are black, gold, and navy blue. The black and gold derive from Reading's civic seal and to the colors of the Germania Liederkranz, one of the area's original soccer clubs. Navy and gold represent the traditional state colors of Pennsylvania.

The logo for Reading United A.C. includes a stylized train that alludes to the famous Reading Railroad, which was one of the first railroads in the United States. The train depiction contains a soccer ball encircled by 11 bolts, symbolizing the 11 players on a soccer field. The shamrocks are a tribute to an Irishman named Paul "Archie" Moylan, the Reading Rage's former team captain, general manager, and coach, who died of cancer in 2000.

The secondary logo features a keystone, a symbol used officially by the Commonwealth of Pennsylvania alluding to its colonial designation as the "Keystone State."

"United" is a common soccer appellation used in the British Isles and represents its relationship to the Philadelphia Union. The initials A.C. stand for "Athletic Club", which indicates the team's goal of expanding its business to incorporate other sports and fitness programs.

== Notable former players ==
This list of notable former players comprises players who went on to play professional soccer after playing for the team in the Premier Development League, or those who previously played professionally before joining the team.

- (United States) Christian Barreiro
- (United States) Will Bates
- (United States) Alex Bono
- (France) Rayane Boukemia
- (Jamaica) Deshorn Brown
- (Bermuda) Tyrell Burgess
- (United States) Ian Christianson
- (United States) Adam Clay
- (United States) Greg Cochrane
- (United States) Joey Dezart
- (United States) Alex Dixon
- (United States) J. T. Dorsey
- (Brazil) Leo Fernandes
- (United States) Ryan Finley
- (United States) Mark Forrest
- (Ghana) Evans Frimpong
- (United States) Ray Gaddis
- (United States) Adam Gazda
- (United States) Matt Hedges
- (Republic of Ireland) Ian Hennessy
- (United States) Corey Hertzog
- (United States) David Horst
- (Ivory Coast) Levi Houapeu
- (United States) Scott Krotee
- (France) Simon Lefebvre
- (Jamaica) Damion Lowe
- (United States) Connor Maloney
- (England) Mo Adams
- (United States) JJ Williams
- (France) Paul Marie
- (Lesotho) Napo Matsoso
- (United States) John McCarthy
- (England) Luke Mulholland
- (United States) Steve Neumann
- (United States) Jimmy Ockford
- (Ghana) Stephen Okai
- (United States) Brian Ownby
- (United States) Jelani Peters
- (Haiti) Frantzdy Pierrot
- (United States) Jeremy Rafanello
- (United States) Pierre Reedy
- (Brazil) Pedro Ribeiro
- (United States) C. J. Sapong
- (United States) Chad Severs
- (United States) Billy Schuler
- (Jamaica) Dawyne Smith
- (United States) Brian Span
- (United States) Sheldon Sullivan
- (United States) Ben Sweat
- (Puerto Rico) Zarek Valentin
- (United States) Jeremy Vuolo
- (United States) Andrew Wenger
- (United States) Aaron Wheeler
- (United States) Jason Yeisley
- (United States) Zach Zandi
- (Canada) Kamal Miller
- (Germany) Ben Lundt
- (Israel) (United States) Irad Young

== Year-by-year ==
Year	Division	League	Regular season	Playoffs	Open Cup
Reading Rage
1996	3	USISL Pro League	4th, Northeast	Conference Semi-Finals	did not qualify
1997	3	USISL D-3 Pro League	1st, Mid Atlantic	Division Semi-Finals	did not qualify
1998	3	USISL D-3 Pro League	2nd, Mid Atlantic	Division Finals	did not qualify
1999	3	USL D-3 Pro League	5th, Northern	Conference Semi-Finals	did not qualify
2000	3	USL D-3 Pro League	4th, Northern	Conference Semi-Finals	did not qualify
2001	3	USL D-3 Pro League	4th, Northern	Conference Semi-Finals	2nd Round
2002	3	USL D-3 Pro League	5th, Atlantic	did not qualify	did not qualify
2003	3	USL Pro Select League	4th, Atlantic	did not qualify	2nd Round
2004	4	USL PDL	5th, Northeast	did not qualify	did not qualify
2005	4	USL PDL	6th, Northeast	did not qualify	did not qualify
2006	4	USL PDL	3rd, Northeast	did not qualify	did not qualify
2007	4	USL PDL	4th, Mid Atlantic	did not qualify	did not qualify
2008	4	USL PDL	1st, Mid Atlantic	National Semi-Finals	did not qualify
2009	4	USL PDL	1st, Mid Atlantic	Divisional Finals	1st Round
Reading United AC
2010	4	USL PDL	1st, Mid Atlantic	National Semi-Finals	1st Round
2011	4	USL PDL	2nd, Mid Atlantic	Conference Quarter-Finals	1st Round
2012	4	USL PDL	2nd, Mid Atlantic	Conference Semi-Finals	2nd Round
2013	4	USL PDL	3rd, Mid Atlantic	Conference Semi-Finals	3rd Round
2014	4	USL PDL	2nd, Mid Atlantic	Conference Playoffs	3rd Round
2015	4	USL PDL	4th, Mid Atlantic	did not qualify	2nd Round
2016	4	USL PDL	1st, Mid Atlantic	Conference Finals	2nd Round
2017	4	USL PDL	2nd, Mid Atlantic	Divisional Playoff	3rd Round
2018	4	USL PDL	1st, Mid Atlantic	Championship Final	2nd Round
2019	4	USL League Two	1st, Mid Atlantic	Championship Final	2nd Round
2020	4	USL League Two	DNP, Mid Atlantic	Season canceled due to COVID-19	DNP
2021	4	USL League Two	5th, Mid Atlantic	did not qualify	did not qualify
2022	4	USL League Two	4th, Mid Atlantic	did not qualify	did not qualify
2023	4	USL League Two	3rd, Mid Atlantic	did not qualify	did not qualify
2024	4	USL League Two	2nd, Mid Atlantic	did not qualify	did not qualify
2025	4	USL League Two	3rd, Mid Atlantic	did not qualify	did not qualify
2026	4	USL League Two	3rd, Mid Atlantic	did not qualify	did not qualify

== Honors ==
1997

- D3Pro Mid Atlantic Division Champions
- Franchise of the Year

2008

- PDL Mid-Atlantic Division Champions
- PDL Eastern Conference Regular Season Champions
- PDL National Semifinalists
- All-League: Adam Gazda

2009

- PDL Mid-Atlantic Division Champions
- PDL Regular Season National Champions
- PDL Player of the Year: Aaron Wheeler
- All-PDL: Aaron Wheeler
- All-Eastern Conference: Aaron Wheeler, Adam Gazda
- All-PDL: Aaron Wheeler
- USL Marketing Award

2010

- PDL Mid-Atlantic Division Champions
- PDL Eastern Conference Champions
- PDL National Semifinalists
- All-PDL: Matt Hedges
- PDL Defender of the Year Finalist: Matt Hedges
- PDL Coach of the Year Finalist: Brendan Burke
- All-Eastern Conference: CJ Sapong, Luke Mulholland, Matt Hedges

2011

- PDL Rookie of the Year Finalist: Brian Holt
- All-Eastern Conference: Stephen Okai, Matthew Baker, Brian Holt
- PDL Communication Award

2012

- PDL Top Goalscorer: Deshorn Brown (13 goals)
- 2012 All-PDL: Deshorn Brown
- 2012 All-Eastern Conference: Deshorn Brown, Stephen Okai, Greg Cochrane

2013

- All-Eastern Conference: Jason Plumhoff, Damion Lowe
- All-PDL: Jason Plumhoff, Damion Lowe
- PDL Communication Award

2014

- All-Eastern Conference: Alex Bono
- PDL Goalkeeper of the Year Finalist: Alex Bono

2016

- Mid-Atlantic Division Champions
- All-Eastern Conference: Paul Marie

2017

- All-Eastern Conference: Aaron Molloy
- All-Eastern Conference Honorable Mention: Alexandre Bouillennec, Lamine Conte, Frantzdy Pierrot
- All-PDL: Aaron Molloy
- Young Player of the Year: Aaron Molloy

2018

- PDL Mid Atlantic Division Champions
- PDL Eastern Conference Champions
- PDL Finalist
- All-PDL: Aaron Molloy
- All-Eastern Conference: Aaron Molloy, Khori Bennett, Kamal Miller, Bennett Strutz
- PDL Franchise of the Year
- PDL Coach of the Year: Alan McCann
- PDL Volunteer of the Year: Jeff Blankenbiller

2019

- USL League Two Mid Atlantic Division Champions
- USL League Two Eastern Conference Champions
- USL League Two Finalist
- USL League Two Defender of the Year: Lamine Conte
- All-USL League Two: Lamine Conte, Felipe Hideki
- All-Eastern Conference: Lamine Conte, Felipe Hideki
- Playoffs: 1996, 1997, 1998, 1999, 2000, 2001, 2004, 2008, 2009, 2010, 2011, 2012, 2013, 2014, 2016, 2017, 2018, 2019
- Division Champions: 1997, 2008, 2009, 2010, 2016, 2018, 2019
- National Semifinalists: 2008, 2010
- National Finalists: 2018, 2019
- Eastern Conference Runner-up: 2016
- US Open Cup Qualifiers: 2001, 2003, 2009, 2010, 2011, 2012, 2013, 2014, 2015, 2016, 2017, 2018, 2019

== Coaches ==
- (United States) Mike Moyer (1996–1997)
- (Republic of Ireland) Archie Moylan (1998–2000)
- (United States) Eric Puls (2001–2002)
- (Republic of Ireland) Seamus O'Connor (2003–2004)
- (England) Derek Broadley (2005–2007)
- (United States) Brendan Burke (2008–2013)
- (United States) David Castellanos (2014–2015)
- (Republic of Ireland) Stephen Hogan (2016–2017)
- (Republic of Ireland) Alan McCann (2018–2020)
- (United States) Casey Moore (2021–2025)
- (United States) Richard Kessler (2026-Present)

== Stadia ==
- Stadium at Fleetwood High School; Fleetwood, Pennsylvania (1996-1997, 2003)
- St. Lawrence Stadium at Central Catholic High School; Reading, Pennsylvania (1998-2002)
- Gene L. Shirk Stadium at Albright College; Reading, Pennsylvania (2004, 2012)
- Don Thomas Stadium at Exeter Township Senior High School; Reading, Pennsylvania (2005–2011, 2013, 2015–2017, 2021)
- Stadium at Oley Valley High School; Oley Valley, Pennsylvania 2 games (2011, 2013)
- Gurski Stadium at Wilson High School; Reading, Pennsylvania (2014, 2018–2019)
- Stadium at Alvernia University; Reading, Pennsylvania (2022-pres)

== Attendances ==
Attendance stats are calculated by averaging each team's self-reported home attendances from Kenn.com https://kenn.com/blog/soccer/all-time-usl-third-division-attendance/

https://kenn.com/blog/soccer/all-time-usl-league-two-attendance/

Reading Rage

- 1996: 1,516
- 1997: 1,351 Playoffs: NA
- 1998: 816 Playoffs: 2,016 Overall: 925
- 1999: 799
- 2000: 751
- 2001: 776
- 2002: 617
- 2003: 626
- 2004: 506 (14th in PDL)
- 2005: 349 (25th in PDL)
- 2006: 275 (34th in PDL)
- 2007: 241 (42nd in PDL)
- 2008: 233 (42nd in PDL) Playoffs: 584 Overall: 303
- 2009: 374 (28th in PDL) Playoffs: 518 Overall: 390

Reading United AC

- 2010: 229 (39th in PDL)
- 2011: 337 (27th in PDL) Playoffs: 300 Overall: 333
- 2012: 299 (33rd in PDL) Playoffs: 316 Overall: 301
- 2013: 386 (26th in PDL)
- 2014: 364 (27th in PDL) Playoffs: 311 Overall: 370
- 2015: 261 (30th in PDL)
- 2016: NA Playoffs:NA
- 2017: NA
- 2018: NA Playoffs: 2,278
- 2019: NA Playoffs:NA
- 2021: NA
- 2022: NA
- 2023: NA
- 2024: NA
- 2025: NA
