= Chevaughn Walsh =

Jamaican footballer (born 1995)

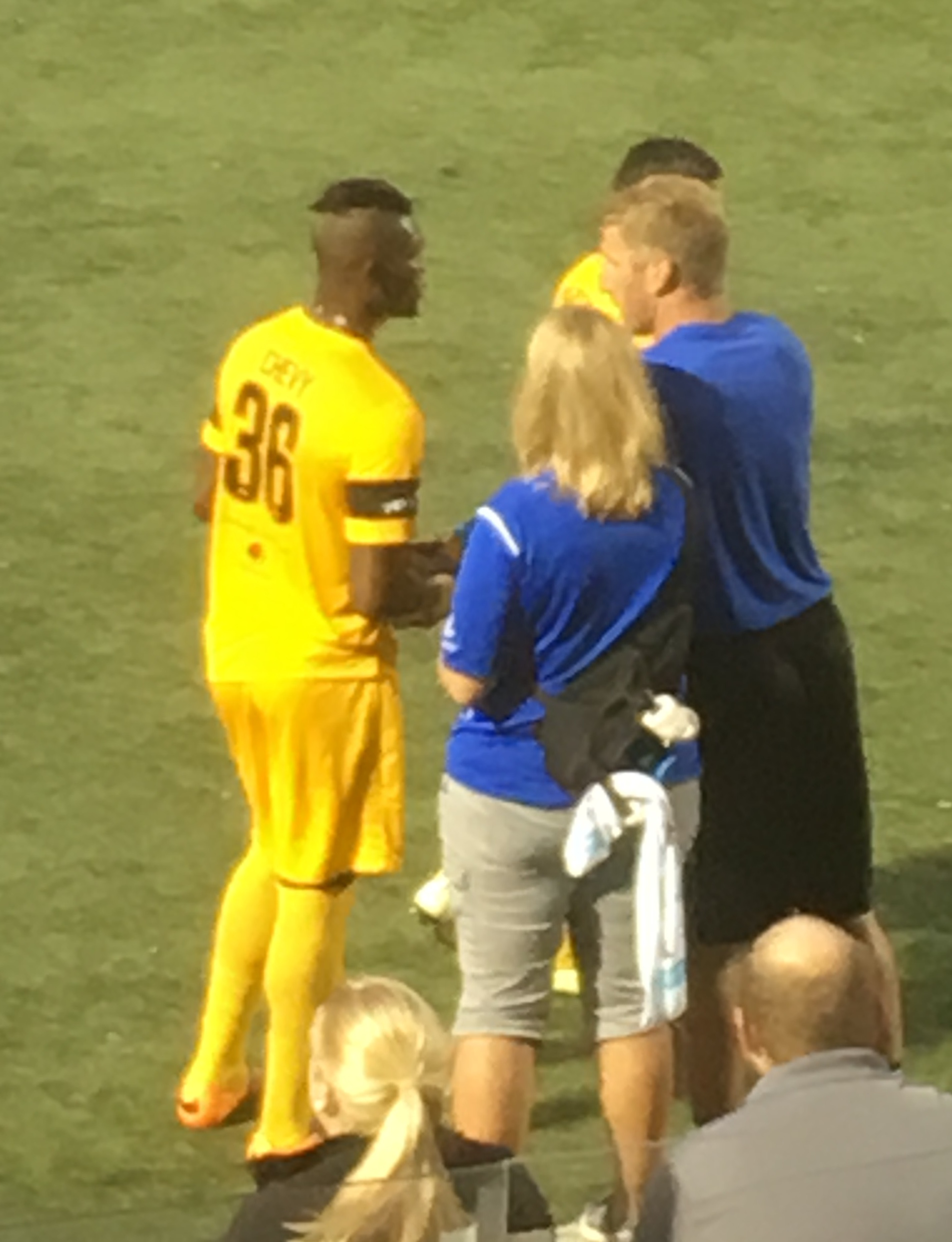
- Walsh with Pittsburgh Riverhounds in 2016

Personal information
- Full name: Chevaughn Junior Hugh Walsh
- Date of birth: 14 May 1995 (age 31)
- Place of birth: Spanish Town, Jamaica
- Height: 1.86 m (6 ft 1 in)
- Position: Forward

Team information
- Current team: Mount Pleasant
- Number: 8

College career
Years	Team	Apps	(Gls)
2014–2015	Jefferson College	40	(39)

Senior career*
Years	Team	Apps	(Gls)
2016	Ocean City Nor'easters	14	(14)
2016–2017	Pittsburgh Riverhounds	27	(6)
2018	Club Atletico Saint Louis	6	(5)
2019–2020	Hoang Anh Gia Lai	33	(19)
2020–2021	Dong A Thanh Hoa	2	(0)
2021–2022	Hong Linh Ha Tinh	9	(4)
2022	PSIS Semarang	10	(1)
2022	Al-Ansar	0	(0)
2023–2024	Portmore United	31	(17)
2025–	Mount Pleasant	12	(2)
- * Club domestic league appearances and goals as of 12 October 2025

Chevaughn Junior Hugh Walsh (born 14 May 1995) is a Jamaican footballer who plays as a forward for National Premier League club Mount Pleasant.

== Career ==
=== Youth ===
In Jamaica Walsh played for local team Willodwale before transferring to Spanish Town Police in July 2012.

=== College and semi-professional ===
Walsh played two seasons of college soccer for the Vikings of Jefferson College in 2015 & 2016. During the two seasons, he tallied 39 goals and 20 assists in 40 matches and was named a NJCAA All-American.

For the 2016 PDL season, Walsh signed for the Ocean City Nor'easters of the Premier Development League. During the season, he scored 14 goals in 14 matches and won the league golden boot (top scorer) award. Following the season, he was named to the 2016 All-PDL team. His 14 goals set a new team record in that category as he tied the existing team record of 31 points for the season. He was then named #2 on PDL's list of top prospects behind only Christian Chaney and the winner of the PDL MVP award.

For the 2018 NPSL season, Walsh returned to his former college coach, Ricardo Garza, to play for Club Atletico Saint Louis of the National Premier Soccer League. During the season, he scored 5 goals in 6 matches and lead his team to the Heartland Conference Semi-Final. Following the season, Chevy was signed with HAGL in Vietnam.

=== Professional ===
On 19 August 2016 it was announced that Walsh had signed a 3-year deal for the Pittsburgh Riverhounds of the United Soccer League. He made his professional debut on 27 August 2016 as a substitute in a 1–1 draw with the Harrisburg City Islanders. On 3 September 2016 he made his first start for the club and scored his first professional goal as Pittsburgh defeated Orlando City B 2–0 in only his second appearance for the Riverhounds.

== Honours ==
Mount Pleasant Academy FA

• Caribbean Cup: 2025

Portmore United

- Lynk Cup: 2023

Individual

- Premier Development League MVP: 2016
- Premier Development League All-PDL Team: 2016
- Premier Development League top scorer: 2016
