= Luis Sánchez Jiménez =

Mexican politician

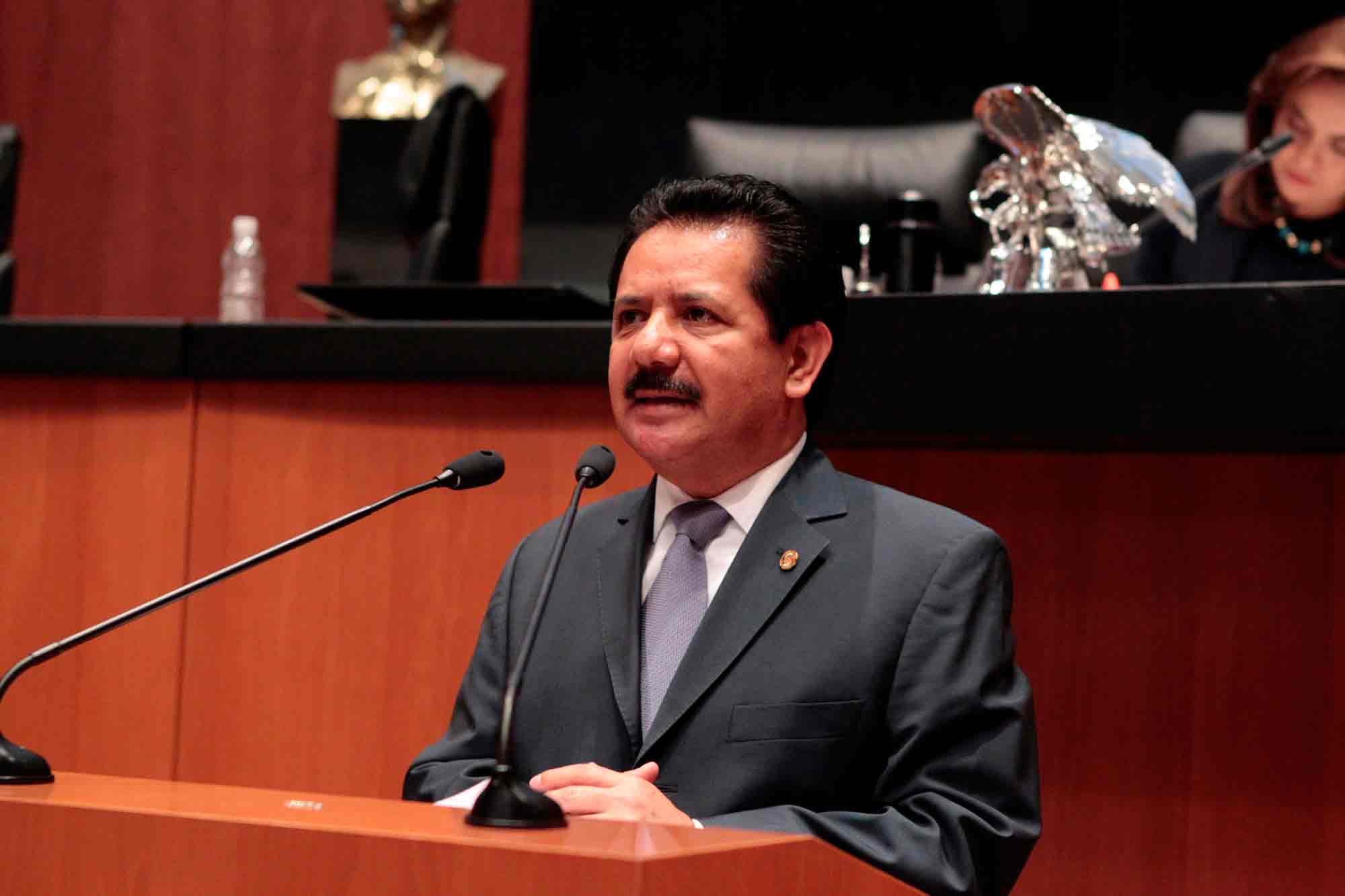
- 2013
- Born: 18 May 1962 (age 64); State of Mexico, Mexico
- Occupation: Politician
- Political party: PRD

Venancio Luis Sánchez Jiménez (Note: In this Mexican name, the surname is Sánchez and the second or maternal family name is Jiménez.) (born 18 May 1962) is a Mexican politician affiliated with the Party of the Democratic Revolution (PRD).

Sánchez Jiménez is a native of the State of Mexico. From 2003 to 2006, he was the municipal president of Nezahualcóyotl, State of Mexico. In the 2006 general election, he was elected to a plurinominal seat the in Chamber of Deputies for the duration of the 60th Congress.

He later served as a national-list senator during the 62nd and 63rd Congresses (2012–2018). In 2016, along with Senator Fernando Mayans Canabal, he faced an internal party investigation after an open-microphone incident in the Senate chamber caught them joking about the victims of human trafficking.
