= Enrique Sánchez Carrasco =

Spanish politician (1928–2021)

Mayor of Huesca
- In office 1983–1995
- Preceded by: José Antonio Llanas Almudévar
- Succeeded by: Luis Acín Boned

Personal details
- Born: 28 March 1928 Almodóvar del Pinar, Spain
- Died: 19 August 2021 (aged 93) Huesca, Spain
- Party: PSOE

Enrique Sánchez Carrasco (28 March 1928 – 19 August 2021) was a Spanish politician and teacher. A member of the Spanish Socialist Workers' Party (PSOE), he served as Mayor of Huesca from 1983 to 1995.

== Biography ==
After earning a law degree from the University of Valencia, Carrasco worked as a secondary school teacher in Tarragona, Valencia, Córdoba, and Huesca.

In 1979, Carrasco was elected to serve on the Municipal Council of Huesca and acted as a spokesman for the PSOE within the city. In 1983, he was elected Mayor and was re-elected in 1987 and 1991.

Enrique Sánchez Carrasco died in Huesca on 19 August 2021 at the age of 93.
