= Russ Klabough =

American soccer player

Personal information
- Full name: Russell Klabough
- Date of birth: May 11, 1990 (age 36)
- Place of birth: Sierra Vista, Arizona, United States
- Height: 1.96 m (6 ft 5 in)
- Position: Goalkeeper

Team information
- Current team: FC Arizona

College career
Years	Team	Apps	(Gls)
2014–2015	Stanislaus State Warriors	28	(0)

Senior career*
Years	Team	Apps	(Gls)
2016	Burlingame Dragons	0	(0)
2016	Midland/Odessa Sockers	4	(0)
2017–2018	Reno 1868	1	(0)
2019–	FC Arizona	0	(0)
- * Club domestic league appearances and goals as of 14:14, 16 October 2018 (UTC)

Russ Klabough (born May 11, 1990) is an American soccer player who currently plays for FC Arizona.

== Career ==
=== College and amateur ===
Klabough played two years of college soccer at California State University, Stanislaus between 2014 and 2015. In 2016, Klabough played with Premier Development League sides Burlingame Dragons and Midland/Odessa Sockers FC.

=== Professional ===
On February 17, 2017, Klabough signed a professional contract with USL club Reno 1868. Klabough was released by Reno on December 3, 2018.

On 14 December 2018, Klabough signed with FC Arizona.
