= Mohammed Moro =

Ghanaian politician

Member of Parliament for Asokwa East
- In office 7 January 1993 – 6 January 1997
- President: Jerry John Rawlings
- Preceded by: Constituency merged
- Succeeded by: Ahmed Musa

Personal details
- Born: 14 April 1952 (age 74)
- Occupation: Storekeeper

Mohammed Moro (14 April 1952) is a Ghanaian politician and member of the first parliament of the fourth republic of Ghana representing Asokwa East Constituency under the membership of the National Democratic Congress.

== Early life and education ==
Mohammed was born on 14 April 1952. He attended Asanteman Secondary School, and Transworld Tutorial College where he obtained his Diploma degree in Sales management and Marketing.

== Career ==
He worked as a storekeeper before going into politics.

== Politics ==
Mohammed began his political career in 1992 when he became the parliamentary candidate for the National Democratic Congress (NDC) to represent Asokwa East constituency prior to the commencement of the 1992 Ghanaian parliamentary election. He was assumed office as a member of the first parliament of the fourth republic of Ghana on 7 January 1993 after being pronounced winner at the 1992 Ghanaian election held on 29 December 1992. He was succeeded by Ahmed Musa of the same party.

== Personal life ==
He is a Muslim.
