= Rayane Boukemia =

French footballer (born 1992)

Personal information
- Date of birth: October 11, 1992 (age 34)
- Place of birth: Strasbourg, France
- Height: 1.85 m (6 ft 1 in)
- Position: Forward

Team information
- Current team: USM Annaba
- Number: 9

Youth career
- 2006–2012: SC Schiltigheim

College career
Years	Team	Apps	(Gls)
2015–2016	SNHU Penmen	30	(18)

Senior career*
Years	Team	Apps	(Gls)
2012–2015	SC Schiltigheim	46	(6)
2016	Reading United	9	(4)
2017	Rochester Rhinos	7	(0)
2018–2019	Bahlinger SC	9	(1)
2019–	USM Annaba		
- * Club domestic league appearances and goals as of 21 July 2019 (UTC)

Rayane Boukemia (born 11 October 1992) is a French footballer who currently plays for USM Annaba in the Algerian Ligue Professionnelle 2.

== Career ==
After nine years in France with SC Schiltigheim and having graduated from the University of Strasbourg in 2015, Boukemia moved to the United States to attend Southern New Hampshire University.

While playing at SNHU, Boukemia played with Premier Development League side Reading United AC in 2016.

Boukemia signed with United Soccer League side Rochester Rhinos on 16 February 2017.
