= Bruno Henrique (footballer, born 1988) =

Brazilian footballer

Personal information
- Full name: Bruno Henrique da Silva Souza
- Date of birth: 10 September 1988 (age 38)
- Place of birth: Londrina, Brazil
- Height: 1.86 m (6 ft 1 in)
- Position: Centre back

Youth career
- 2002–2007: Paraná

Senior career*
Years	Team	Apps	(Gls)
2007–2010	Paraná		
2010–2011	Avaí	1	(0)
2011	Cambé		
2012	Paranavaí		
- * Club domestic league appearances and goals

Bruno Henrique da Silva Souza (born 10 September 1988 in Londrina), known as Bruno Henrique, is a Brazilian footballer who plays as a central defender.
