= Andrés Ruiz =

Colombian athlete

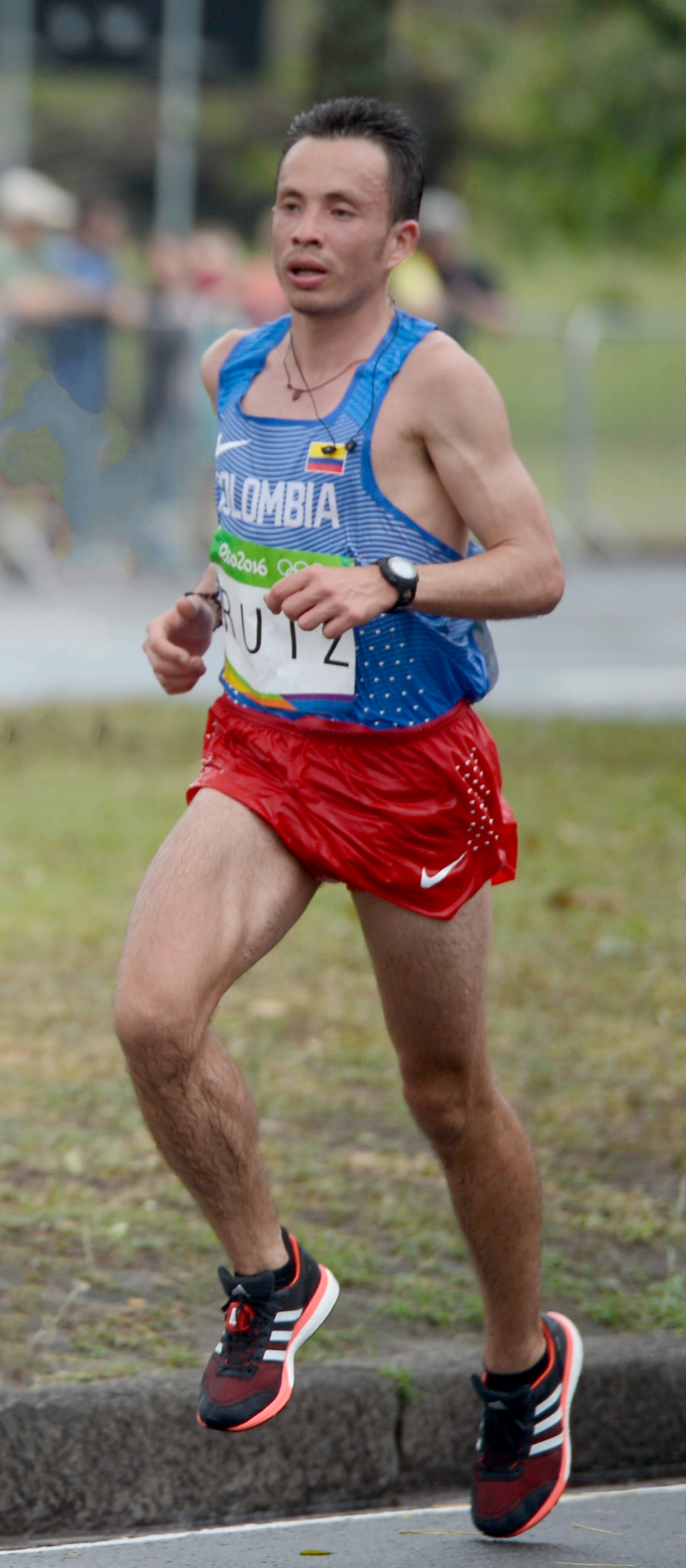
- Ruiz at the 2016 Olympics

Personal information
- Born: 16 July 1988 (age 37) Bogotá, Colombia
- Height: 164 cm (5 ft 5 in)
- Weight: 64 kg (141 lb)

Sport
- Sport: Track and field
- Event: Marathon
- Coached by: Libardo Hoyos (national)

Achievements and titles
- Personal best: 2:17:39 (2016)

Andrés Ruiz (born 16 July 1988) is a Colombian long-distance runner. He finished 79th in the marathon at the 2016 Summer Olympics.

Ruiz is married to Patricia Mojica, they have a daughter Juana Lucia (born 2013). His wife is also a long-distance runner, and competes in the same team at the national level. Ruiz initially wanted to become a cyclist, but could not afford buying a racing bicycle, and eventually changed to running at the age of 16–18. Between 2009 and 2015 he had no sports funding and no personal coach, and hence worked in the family business, and also as a courier and accounting assistant. He received state funding in November 2015.
