= Pedro Dias =

Pedro Dias may refer to:

- Pedro Dias (footballer, born 1973), Portuguese football manager and former forward
- Pedro Dias (judoka) (born 1982), Portuguese judoka
- Pedro Dias (footballer, born 1992), Brazilian football forward

== See also ==
- Pedro Díaz (disambiguation)
