= Carlos Sánchez (comedian) =

Argentine comedian (1952–2021)

- Born: 19 July 1952; Bahía Blanca, Argentina
- Died: 2 March 2021 (aged 68); Buenos Aires, Argentina
- Occupation(s): Comedian; Actor

Carlos Sánchez (19 July 1952 – 2 March 2021) was an Argentine comedian, actor, and singer.

== Biography ==
Sánchez began his career in the theatre, acting in Villa Carlos Paz and Mar del Plata. He appeared on television programs such as Moria Banana, Videomatch, Cantando por un Sueño, and Susana Giménez. He was also summoned to appear on El humor de Café Fashion. He acted in the 1997 film La herencia del tío Pepe, directed by Hugo Sofovich.

Carlos Sánchez died of kidney cancer in Buenos Aires on 2 March 2021 at the age of 68.

== Filmography ==
=== Cinema ===
- La herencia del tío Pepe (1997)

=== Television ===
- Moria Banana (1995)
- Hola Susana (1995–2000)
- Petardos (1998)
- Videomatch (1998–2000)
- Café Fashion (1999–2000)
- Sábado bus (2001)
- La Peluquería de Don Mateo (2005)
- Cantando por un Sueño (2012)
- Sábado Show (2012)
- Argentina, tierra de amor y venganza (2019)
