= Bruno Turco =

Brazilian footballer (born 1991)

Personal information
- Full name: Bruno Henrique Turco
- Date of birth: 30 July 1991 (age 35)
- Place of birth: Piracicaba, Brazil
- Height: 1.81 m (5 ft 11 in)
- Position: Defensive midfielder

Team information
- Current team: ABC (on loan from Deportivo Maldonado)

Youth career
- Palmeiras

Senior career*
Years	Team	Apps	(Gls)
2010–2011	Palmeiras	3	(0)
2011	Palmeiras B	6	(0)
2012–2013	Macaé	0	(0)
2012–2013	→ Vitória Setúbal (loan)	5	(0)
2013–2014	Deportivo Maldonado	37	(0)
2015	Ermis	14	(1)
2015–2016	Nacional Asunción	20	(0)
2016–	Deportivo Maldonado	52	(1)
2019–	→ ABC (loan)	0	(0)
- * Club domestic league appearances and goals as of 11:58, 1 July 2019 (UTC)

Bruno Henrique Turco (born 30 July 1991) is a Brazilian footballer who plays as a defensive midfielder for ABC on loan from Deportivo Maldonado. He played for the Cyprus side Ermis Aradippou.
