= Jesús Sánchez =

Jesús Sánchez may refer to:

- Jesús Sánchez (pitcher) (born 1974), Dominican baseball pitcher
- Jesús Sánchez (outfielder) (born 1997), Dominican baseball outfielder
- Jesús Sánchez (boxer), Dominican Republic boxer
- Jesús Sánchez (fencer), Mexican fencer
- Jesús Sánchez (volleyball) (born 1968), Spanish former volleyball player
- Jesús Rivera Sánchez, Secretary of the Puerto Rico Department of Education, 2010–2011
- Jesús Sánchez (footballer, born 1984), Mexican footballer
- Jesús Sánchez (footballer, born 1989), Mexican footballer
- Jesús Sánchez (racewalker) (born 1976), Mexican race walker
