= Jesús Sánchez (volleyball) =

Spanish volleyball player (born 1968)

Personal information
- Full name: Jesús Sánchez Jover
- Nationality: Spanish
- Born: March 18, 1968 (age 58); Murcia, Spain

Volleyball information
- Number: 7

National team
1991-1996	Spain

Jesús Sánchez (born 18 March 1968) is a Spanish former volleyball player who competed in the 1992 Summer Olympics.
