= Joel Sanchez (baseball) =

Current position
- Title: Pitching coach
- Team: Jackson State
- Conference: SWAC

Playing career
- 1994–1995: NMJC
- 1996–1997: New Mexico State
- Positions: P, SS

Coaching career (HC unless noted)
- 2001–2008: Bethune-Cookman (P)
- 2009: Vermont Lake Monsters (P)
- 2010: GCL Nationals (P)
- 2011: Daytona State (P)
- 2012–2014: North Carolina A&T
- 2015–2019: Daytona State (P)
- 2020–present: Jackson State (P)

Head coaching record
- Overall: 53–106
- Tournaments: MEAC: 3–4

Joel Sanchez is an American college baseball coach and former pitcher and shortstop. He is the pitching coach at Jackson State University. Sanchez played two seasons at NMJC, followed by two seasons at New Mexico State. He then played three seasons with Ciudad Juárez of the Mexican League. In 2001, he became an assistant coach with Bethune-Cookman. He spent eight seasons with the Wildcats, during which they won seven Mid-Eastern Athletic Conference championships and made seven NCAA Regional appearances. Sanchez served as recruiting coordinator and pitching coach, and saw fifteen of his players (plus three more than he recruited) drafted. He then spent one season each as pitching coach with the Vermont Lake Monsters and Gulf Coast League Nationals of the Washington Nationals organization. Sanchez next spent one season as an assistant with NJCAA Daytona State. Before moving to North Carolina A&T. He was named head coach at North Carolina A&T prior to the 2012 season.

== Head coaching record ==
Record table
| Season | Team | Overall | Conference | Standing | Postseason |
|---|---|---|---|---|---|
North Carolina A&T Aggies (Mid-Eastern Athletic Conference) (2012–2014)
| 2012 | North Carolina A&T | 20–36 | 12–12 | 3rd South | MEAC Tournament (Note: The top four teams of the MEAC South Division's five teams qualified for the tournament in 2012.) |
| 2013 | North Carolina A&T | 16–38 | 8–16 | 4th South | MEAC Tournament (Note: The top four teams of the MEAC South Division's five teams qualified for the tournament in 2013.) |
| 2014 | North Carolina A&T | 17–32 | 9–15 | 5th South | |
| North Carolina A&T: | | 53–106 | 27–43 | | |
| Total: | | 53–106 | | | |
National champion Postseason invitational champion Conference regular season champion Conference regular season and conference tournament champion Division regular season champion Division regular season and conference tournament champion Conference tournament champion
