= Eduardo Cubells =

Spanish footballer and manager

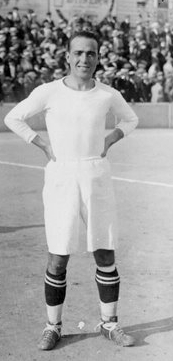

Personal information
- Full name: Eduardo Cubells Ridaura
- Date of birth: 17 January 1900
- Place of birth: Valencia, Spain
- Date of death: 13 March 1964 (aged 64)
- Position: Midfielder

Senior career*
Years	Team	Apps	(Gls)
1919–1932	Valencia	299	(279)
Total		299	(279)

International career
1925	Spain	5	(1)
1922–1923	Valencian Community	2	(3)

Managerial career
- 1943–1946: Valencia
- * Club domestic league appearances and goals

Eduardo Cubells Ridaura (17 January 1900 – 13 March 1964) was a Spanish football player and manager.

== Club career ==
Born in Valencia, Cubells began to play football in some of the first teams that have already disappeared in Valencia, such as Deportivo Español, before moving on to Valencia when it was founded, playing as a midfielder for 13 years.

He became one of the first Mestalla idols along with Arturo "Montes" Montesinos with whom he had a great friendship, although the fans were divided into "cubellistas" or "montistas".

== International career ==
He became the first Valencia player to play for the Spain national team when he made his debut on 17 May 1925 in a match against Portugal. He was capped 5 games and scored only once, in a 1–0 win over Austria on 27 September 1925.

Being a Valencia player, he was eligible to play for the Valencian national team, and he was part of the team's first-ever line-up on 19 November 1922, in the quarter-finals of the 1922-23 Prince of Asturias Cup against an Andalusia XI, who were also making their international with the likes of Kinké, and although they lost 1–2, Cubells scored the consolation goal, thus becoming the author of the first goal in the history of the team. In the following edition they faced Andalusia in the quarter-finals again, and again they lost this time 2–3, with Cubells being once again the scorer of Valencia's consolation goals. Despite never going further than the quarter-finals, he is among the all-time top goal scorer in the competition's history with three goals.

== Managerial career ==
He managed Valencia.

=== International goals ===
==== Goals for Spain ====
Spain score listed first, score column indicates score after each Cubells goal.

List of international goals scored by Eduardo Cubells
No.	Date	Venue	Opponent	Score	Result	Competition
1	27 September 1925	Hohe Warte Stadium, Vienna, Austria	Austria	1–0	1–0	Friendly

==== Goals for Valencian Community ====
Valencia score listed first, score column indicates score after each Cubells goal.

List of international goals scored by Eduardo Cubells
No.	Date	Venue	Opponent	Score	Result	Competition
1	19 November 1922	Campo de Algirós, Valencia, Spain	Andalusia		1–2	1922-23 Prince of Asturias Cup quarter-finals
2	11 November 1923	Mestalla Stadium, Valencia, Spain	Andalusia	1–2	2–3	1923-24 Prince of Asturias Cup quarter-finals
3	11 November 1923	Mestalla Stadium, Valencia, Spain	Andalusia	2–2	2–3	1923-24 Prince of Asturias Cup quarter-finals
