= Arturo Montesinos =

Spanish footballer and manager

Montes
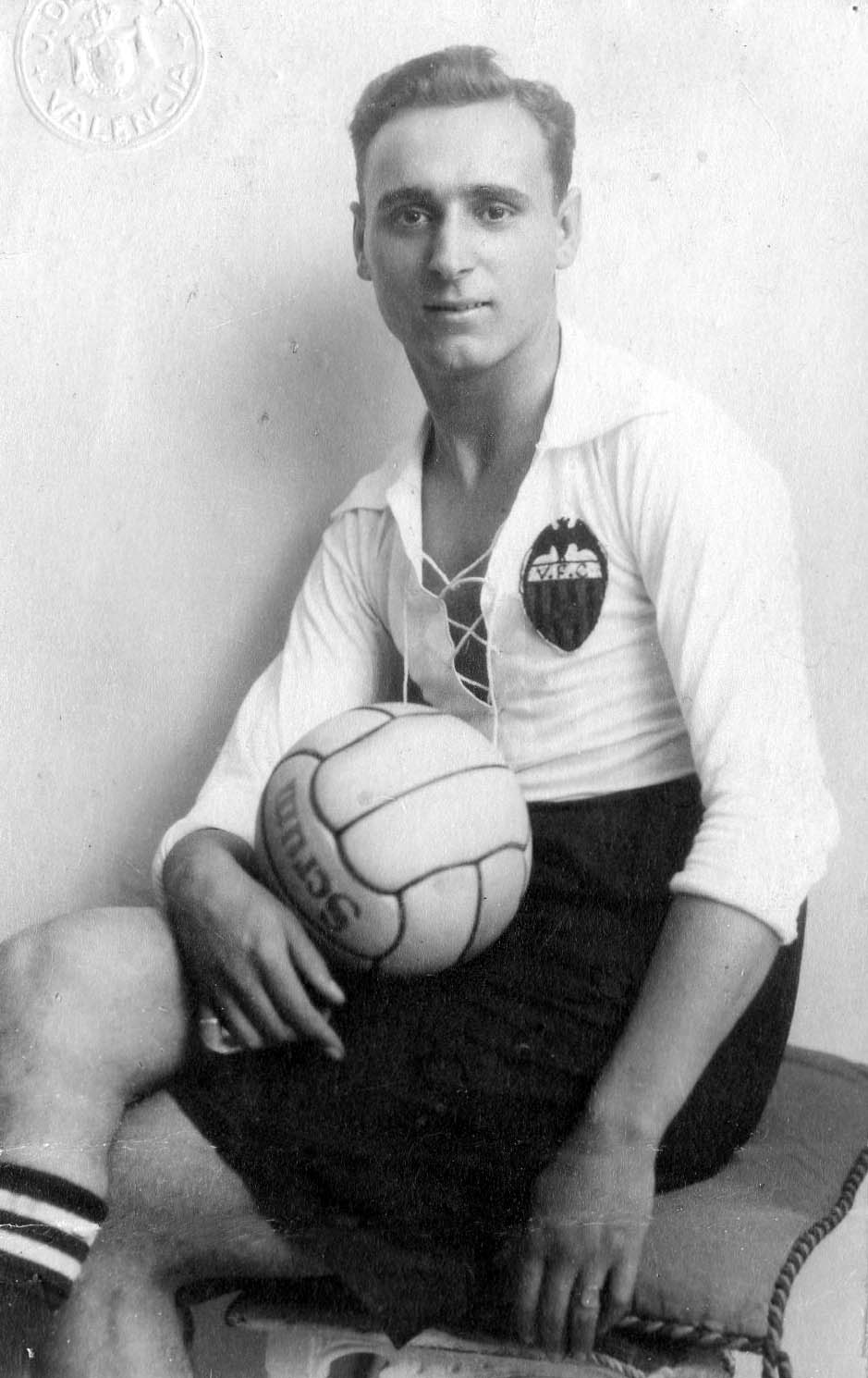
- Arturo Montesinos in 1920

Personal information
- Full name: Arturo Montesinos Cebrián
- Date of birth: 12 July 1900
- Place of birth: Valencia, Spain
- Date of death: 15 August 1982 (aged 82)
- Height: 1.85 m (6 ft 1 in)
- Position: Forward

Senior career*
Years	Team	Apps	(Gls)
1920–1928	Valencia		
1928–1929	Gimnástico FC		
1929–	Alicante CF		

International career
1922–1923	Valencian Community	2	(0)
- * Club domestic league appearances and goals

Arturo Montesinos Cebrián (12 July 1900 – 15 August 1982), nickname Montes, was a Spanish football player who played as a forward. He was one of the first idols of the newly created Valencia CF, since he was a crucial player in the difficult beginnings of the club, contributing decisively to take Valencia to the top of Spanish football. At Mestalla, he scored 262 goals in 266 games (including friendlies and unofficial matches), making him one of the most prolific scorers in the club's history, having a ratio of almost one goal per game.

== Club career ==
Born in Valencia on 12 July 1900, Montes began to play football at the Salesian College of Valencia, before joining Valencia almost casually. Accompanying a friend to a test at the Algirós, the enormous precision with which he returned the balls that left the field made the scouts notice him and incorporate him into the team, and thus Valencia found, almost unwittingly, one of the best Spanish goal scorers of that time. He made his debut on 27 June 1920 against Gimnástico FC.

He became one of the first Mestalla idols along with Eduardo Cubells, with whom he had a great friendship, although the fans were divided into "montistas" and "cubellistas". History seems to have blurred the legend of Montes in favor of Cubells, reducing him to a great poacher in the face of Cubells' technique and quality in the midfield, however, Montes was as good a dribbler as Cubells. He played a pivotal role in Valencia's first-ever piece of silverware, the 1923 Levante Championship, and he was then also crucial in the club's three back-to-back Championships between 1925 and 1927.

His and Cubells's dismissal in 1928, closed a beautiful chapter in Valencia's history. After leaving Valencia, he played for Gimnástico FC and later, for Alicante CF.

== International career ==
He was called up to the Spain national team to play against Austria on 21 December 1924, but despite outperforming his rivals for the place, he was excluded from the starting eleven and named a substitute, something he, with great dignity, refused. As a result of this, he never again in international play.

Being a Valencia player, he was eligible to play for the Valencian national team, and he was one of the eleven footballers that played in the team's first-ever game on 19 November 1922, which ended in a 1–2 loss to a Andalusia XI in the quarter-finals of the 1922–23 Prince of Asturias Cup, with Cubells being the author of the team's first-ever goal. In the following edition they faced Andalusia in the quarter-finals again, and again they lost this time 2-3, with Cubells being once again the scorer of Valencia's consolation goals, although he is listed in some sources as the scorer of the second goal.

== Honours ==
=== Club ===
Valencia CF

Levante Championship:

- Winners (4) 1923, 1925, 1926 and 1927
