= 2020 Birmingham Legion FC season =

Birmingham Legion FC
2020 season
- Owners: List: Jack Bryant Billy Harbert John Harbert Jeff Logan James Outland Jim Rein Lee Styslinger III
- Head coach: Tom Soehn
- USL Championship: Conference: 7th Group G: 2nd
- USLC Playoffs: Conference Quarterfinals
- 2020 U.S. Open Cup: Cancelled
- Biggest win: MIA 0–4 BHM (September 16)
- Biggest defeat: BHM 1–3 CLT (September 12); MEM 3–1 BHM (October 3); TBR 4–2 BHM (October 10)
Home colors	Away colors	Third colors

The 2020 Birmingham Legion FC season was the club's second season of existence and their second in the USL Championship, the second tier of American soccer. This article covers the period from November 18, 2019, the day after the 2019 USLC Playoff Final, to the conclusion of the 2020 USLC Playoff Final, scheduled for November 12–16, 2020.

== Roster ==
As of January 22, 2020

No.	Name	Nationality	Position(s)	Date of birth (age)	Signed in	Previous club	Apps.	Goals
Goalkeepers
0	Joe Nasco	(United States)	GK	June 18, 1984 (age 42)	2019	(United States) Fort Lauderdale Strikers	0	0
1	Matt Van Oekel	(United States)	GK	September 20, 1986 (age 39)	2019	(United States) OKC Energy	0	0
18	Trevor Spangenberg	(United States)	GK	April 21, 1991 (age 35)	2019	(United States) Richmond Kickers	0	0
Defenders
3	Kyle Fisher	(United States)	DF	June 19, 1994 (age 32)	2019	(Canada) Montreal Impact	0	0
12	Eric Avila	(United States)	DF	November 24, 1987 (age 38)	2019	(United States) Las Vegas Lights	0	0
15	Akeem Ward	(United States)	DF	January 6, 1996 (age 30)	2019	(United States) D.C. United	0	0
17	Gael Mabiala	(France)	DF	June 7, 1994 (age 32)	2019	(United States) UAB Blazers	0	0
22	Mathieu Laurent	(Canada)	DF	February 28, 1996 (age 30)	2019	(United States) UAB Blazers	0	0
23	Benjamin Kucera	(United States)	DF	August 10, 1994 (age 32)	2019	(United States) Birmingham Hammers	0	0
30	Razak Cromwell	(Ghana)	DF	October 3, 1994 (age 31)	2019	(Ghana) Dreams FC (loan)	0	0
33	Kyle Culbertson	(United States)	DF	November 3, 1992 (age 33)	2019	(United States) Saint Louis FC	0	0
Midfielders
2	Marcos Ugarte	(United States)	MF	December 2, 1992 (age 33)	2019	(Denmark) Ringkøbing	0	0
5	Mikey Lopez	(United States)	MF	February 20, 1993 (age 33)	2019	(United States) San Antonio FC	0	0
6	Anderson Asiedu	(Ghana)	MF	June 12, 1996 (age 30)	2019	(United States) Atlanta United FC	0	0
8	Joe Holland	(England)	MF	April 21, 1993 (age 33)	2019	(United States) Pittsburgh Riverhounds SC	0	0
14	Daniel Johnson	(United States)	MF	September 8, 1995 (age 31)	2019	(United States) Chicago Fire	0	0
16	Daigo Kobayashi	(Japan)	MF	February 19, 1983 (age 43)	2019	(United States) Las Vegas Lights	0	0
21	Zachary Herivaux	(Haiti)	MF	February 1, 1996 (age 30)	2019	(United States) New England Revolution (loan)	0	0
Forwards
7	Brian Wright	(Canada)	FW	March 24, 1995 (age 31)	2019	(United States) New England Revolution (loan)	0	0
9	Chandler Hoffman	(United States)	FW	August 17, 1990 (age 36)	2019	(United States) Real Monarchs	0	0
10	Prosper Kasim	(Ghana)	FW	December 15, 1996 (age 29)	2019	(Sweden) IFK Göteborg	0	0
11	JJ Williams	(United States)	FW	January 4, 1998 (age 28)	2019	(United States) Columbus Crew SC (loan)	0	0
13	Tyler Savitsky	(United States)	FW	July 5, 1996 (age 30)	2019	(Denmark) Næstved	0	0
27	Edward Opoku	(Ghana)	FW	August 1, 1996 (age 30)	2019	(United States) Columbus Crew SC (loan)	0	0
88	Femi Hollinger-Janzen	(Benin)	FW	December 14, 1993 (age 32)	2019	(United States) New England Revolution	0	0

== Competitions ==
=== Exhibitions ===
February 8 Preseason 1	Birmingham Legion	2–3	Atlanta United FC	Birmingham, AL
3:30PM CDT	Brett 48' (pen.); Mensah 80'	BIR report ATL report	Barco 44'; Mulraney (yellow card) 51'; Jahn 67' (pen.); Rossetto 90+2'	Stadium: BBVA Field; Attendance: 6,722

February 16 Preseason 2	Birmingham Legion	v	TBD	Birmingham, AL
CDT				Stadium: BBVA Field; Attendance: Closed

February 19 Preseason 3	Birmingham Legion	3–0	Forward Madison FC	Hoover, AL
1:00 PM CST	Bergmann 27'; Servania 40'; Hoffman 50'	Report		Stadium: Hoover Metropolitan Complex; Attendance: Closed
Note: 70 minute scrimmage

February 22 Preseason 4	Birmingham Legion	v	Atlanta United 2	Marietta, GA
CDT				Stadium: Atlanta United Training Facility

February 22 Preseason 5	Antigua GFC (Guatemala)	v	(United States) Birmingham Legion	Antigua, Guatemala
12:45PM CDT

=== USL Championship ===
==== Standings — Group G ====
Pos	Team	Pld	W	D	L	GF	GA	GD	Pts	PPG	Qualification
1	Charlotte Independence	16	8	4	4	24	22	+2	28	1.75	Advance to USL Championship Playoffs
2	Birmingham Legion FC	16	7	4	5	29	19	+10	25	1.56	Advance to USL Championship Playoffs
3	North Carolina FC	15	6	1	8	17	21	−4	19	1.27	
4	Memphis 901 FC	15	4	4	7	24	31	−7	16	1.07	

Source: USL

==== Match results ====
In the preparations for the resumption of league play following the shutdown prompted by the COVID-19 pandemic, Birmingham's schedule was announced on July 7.

July 15 1	Birmingham Legion	3–0	Memphis 901 FC	Birmingham, AL
7:00 PM CDT	Lapa 22', 41'; Servania (yellow card) 30'; Wright 31'; A. Crognale (yellow card) 52'	Report	da Silva (yellow card) 27'; Carroll (red card) 58'	Stadium: BBVA Field; Referee: Matthew Thompson
Note: Televised live on ESPN2

July 19 2	Charleston Battery	1–2	Birmingham Legion	Charleston, SC
6:00 PM CDT	Lewis 29'; Daley (yellow card) 51'	Report	Wright 12'; A. Crognale (yellow card) 40'; Rufe (yellow card) 45+1'; Cromwell (yellow card) 48'; Lapa 54'; Akinyode (yellow card) 82'; Servania	Stadium: MUSC Health Stadium; Referee: Kevin Broadley

July 25 3	Birmingham Legion	1–1	Tampa Bay Rowdies	Birmingham, AL
7:30 PM CDT	A. Crognale 16'; Akinyode (yellow card) 45+1'; Asiedu (yellow card) 66'	Report	Lasso (yellow card) 13'; Guenzatti 51'	Stadium: BBVA Field; Referee: Chris Ruska

August 1 4	North Carolina FC	1–0	Birmingham Legion	Cary, NC
6:00 PM CDT	Donovan (yellow card) 29'; Fortune 51', (yellow card) 90+2'; Kristo (yellow card) 87'	Report	Akinyode (red card) 33'; Brett (yellow card) 45'	Stadium: WakeMed Soccer Park; Referee: Kevin Broadley

August 5 5	Birmingham Legion	4–1	Charlotte Independence	Birmingham, AL
7:00 PM CDT	Dean 5'; Brett 11', 66'; Lapa 52'	Report	Vadalá (yellow card) 29'; Martínez 76' (pen.)	Stadium: BBVA Field; Referee: Matthew Thompson

August 8 6	Birmingham Legion	1–0	Atlanta United 2	Birmingham, AL
6:30 PM CDT	A. Crognale (yellow card) 27'; Kasim 45+1'	Report	Jadama (yellow card) 36'	Stadium: BBVA Field; Referee: Muhammad Hassan

August 12 7	North Carolina FC	1–1	Birmingham Legion	Matthews, NC
6:00 PM CDT	Etou (yellow card) 52'; Kelly 82'	Report	Lopez (yellow card) 3', (goal) 90+3'; E. Crognale (yellow card) 47'; Kasim (yellow card) 56'; Asiedu (yellow card) 68' (yellow-red card) 80'	Stadium: Sportsplex at Matthews; Referee: John Matto

August 15 8	North Carolina FC	0–2	Birmingham Legion	Cary, NC
7:30 PM CDT	Donovan (yellow card) 48'	Report	Servania 18'; Brett 21' (pen.); A. Crognale (yellow card) 42'; Akinyode (yellow card) 46'; Van Oekel (yellow card) 59'; Lopez (yellow card) 60'	Stadium: WakeMed Soccer Park; Referee: Matthew Franz

August 22 9	Birmingham Legion	2–2	Memphis 901 FC	Birmingham, AL
6:30 PM CDT	Lapa 12'; Asiedu (yellow card) 24'; Akinyode (yellow card) 28'; Brett 90+8' (pen.)	Report	Mentzingen 18', (yellow card) 90+4'; Marsh-Brown 29' (pen.), (yellow card) 52'; Gonzalez (yellow card) 45'; Hague (yellow card) 90+2'	Stadium: BBVA Field; Referee: Muhammad Hassan

August 29 10	Charlotte Independence	1–4	Birmingham Legion	Matthews, NC
6:00 PM CDT	Etou (yellow card) 82'; Kelly 86'	Report	A. Crognale (yellow card) 24'; Servania 26'; Brett 33', 49'; E. Crognale (yellow card) 42' (yellow-red card) 58'; Asiedu (yellow card) 63'; Wright 83', (yellow card) 90+1'	Stadium: Sportsplex at Matthews; Referee: Sergii Demianchuk

September 2 11	Birmingham Legion	1–2	North Carolina FC	Birmingham, AL
7:00 PM CDT	Kobayashi (yellow card) 45+1'; Kasim 59'; Brett (penalty missed) 90'	Report	Albadawi 24'; Fortune 62' (pen.)	Stadium: BBVA Field; Referee: Lukasz Szpala

September 5 12	Memphis 901	1–1	Birmingham Legion	Memphis, TN
7:00 PM CDT	Baxter (yellow card) 25'; Marsh-Brown 28'; Metzger (yellow card) 61' (yellow-red card) 73'	Report	E. Crognale (yellow card) 43'; Lapa 48' (pen.), (yellow card) 89'	Stadium: AutoZone Park; Referee: Jervis Atagana

September 12 13	Birmingham Legion	1–3	Charlotte Independence	Birmingham, AL
6:30 PM CDT	Brett 34'; Asiedu (yellow card) 48' (yellow-red card) 60'	Report	Kelly 17', (yellow card) 30', (goal) 45'; Etou (yellow card) 23'; Lacroix (yellow card) 81'; Gebhard 86'; Johnson (yellow card) 88' (yellow-red card) 90'	Stadium: BBVA Field; Referee: Matthew Thompson

September 16 14	Miami FC	0–4	Birmingham Legion	Miami, FL
6:30 PM CDT	Rozeboom (yellow card) 52'	Report	Brett 35', 55'; Dean (yellow card) 38'; A. Crognale 42', 45+1'	Stadium: Riccardo Silva Stadium; Referee: Alyssa Nichols

September 26 15	Birmingham Legion	1–2	North Carolina FC	Birmingham, AL
6:30 PM CDT	Cromwell (yellow card) 23'; Servania 67'; Williams (yellow card) 87'	Report	Perez 7', (yellow card) 37'; Fortune 26'; Kristo (yellow card) 90+6'	Stadium: BBVA Field; Referee: Jonathan Bilinski

October 3 16	Memphis 901	3–1	Birmingham Legion	Memphis, TN
7:00 PM CDT	Jennings 36', 54', 86'; Muckette (yellow card) 43'; Marsh-Brown (yellow card) 79'	Report	A. Crognale (yellow card) 23'; Lopez (yellow card) 33'; Lapa 41'; Williams (yellow card) 66'	Stadium: AutoZone Park; Attendance: 901; Referee: Ben Meyer

==== USL Cup Playoffs ====
October 10 Conf. Quarterfinals	Tampa Bay Rowdies	4–2	Birmingham Legion	St. Petersburg, FL
6:30 PM CDT	Doherty 8'; Guenzatti 38'; Mkosana 78'; Fernandes 80'	Report	Crognale (yellow card) 10'; Lopez (yellow card) 20'; Williams (yellow card) 42'; Kasim 57'; Lapa 63'; Cromwell (yellow card) 85'	Stadium: Al Lang Stadium; Attendance: 1,098; Referee: Eric Tattersall

=== U.S. Open Cup ===
As a USL Championship club, Birmingham will enter the competition in the Second Round, to be played April 7–9.

April 7 2nd Round	Chattanooga Red Wolves SC (Tennessee)	P–P	(Alabama) Birmingham Legion	Chattanooga, TN
7:00 PM CDT				Stadium: Chattanooga Christian School
Note: Match postponed due to the COVID-19 pandemic
