= 2019 Birmingham Legion FC season =

Birmingham Legion FC
2019 season
- Owners: List: Jack Bryant Billy Harbert John Harbert Jeff Logan James Outland Jim Rein Lee Styslinger III
- Head coach: Tom Soehn
- USL Championship: Conference: 10th (current)
- USLC Playoffs: Conference Quarterfinals
- U.S. Open Cup: Third round (knocked out by Louisville City)
- Top goalscorer: League: JJ Williams (7); All: Prosper Kasim, JJ Williams (7)
- Highest home attendance: 5,807 (March 10 vs. Bethlehem)
- Lowest home attendance: 3,307 (May 15 vs. West Chester, USOC)
- Average home league attendance: 4,562
- Biggest win: 5–0 (September 4 at Atlanta)
- Biggest defeat: 0–7 (October 26 at Pittsburgh)
Home colors	Away colors

The 2019 Birmingham Legion FC season was the club's inaugural season and their first in the USL Championship, the second tier of American soccer. The season covers the period from the founding of the club to the start of the 2020 USL Championship season.

== Roster ==
As of match played October 5, 2019

No.	Name	Nationality	Position(s)	Date of birth (age)	Signed in	Previous club	Apps.	Goals
Goalkeepers
0	Joe Nasco	(United States)	GK	June 18, 1984 (age 41)	2019	(United States) Fort Lauderdale Strikers	0	0
1	Matt Van Oekel	(United States)	GK	September 20, 1986 (age 39)	2019	(United States) OKC Energy	27	0
18	Trevor Spangenberg	(United States)	GK	April 21, 1991 (age 34)	2019	(United States) Richmond Kickers	6	0
Defenders
3	Kyle Fisher	(United States)	DF	June 19, 1994 (age 31)	2019	(Canada) Montreal Impact	21	0
12	Eric Avila	(United States)	DF	November 24, 1987 (age 38)	2019	(United States) Las Vegas Lights	29	0
15	Akeem Ward	(United States)	DF	January 6, 1996 (age 30)	2019	(United States) D.C. United	10	0
17	Gael Mabiala	(France)	DF	June 7, 1994 (age 31)	2019	(United States) UAB Blazers	11	0
22	Mathieu Laurent	(Canada)	DF	February 28, 1996 (age 29)	2019	(United States) UAB Blazers	27	2
23	Benjamin Kucera	(United States)	DF	August 10, 1994 (age 31)	2019	(United States) Birmingham Hammers	4	0
30	Razak Cromwell	(Ghana)	DF	October 3, 1994 (age 31)	2019	(Ghana) Dreams FC (loan)	19	0
33	Kyle Culbertson	(United States)	DF	November 3, 1992 (age 33)	2019	(United States) Saint Louis FC	29	1
Midfielders
2	Marcos Ugarte	(United States)	MF	December 2, 1992 (age 33)	2019	(Denmark) Ringkøbing	7	0
5	Mikey Lopez	(United States)	MF	February 20, 1993 (age 32)	2019	(United States) San Antonio FC	26	3
6	Anderson Asiedu	(Ghana)	MF	June 12, 1996 (age 29)	2019	(United States) Atlanta United FC	12	0
8	Joe Holland	(England)	MF	April 21, 1993 (age 32)	2019	(United States) Pittsburgh Riverhounds SC	15	0
14	Daniel Johnson	(United States)	MF	September 8, 1995 (age 30)	2019	(United States) Chicago Fire	31	4
16	Daigo Kobayashi	(Japan)	MF	February 19, 1983 (age 42)	2019	(United States) Las Vegas Lights	19	0
21	Zachary Herivaux	(Haiti)	MF	February 1, 1996 (age 30)	2019	(United States) New England Revolution (loan)	19	0
Forwards
7	Brian Wright	(Canada)	FW	March 24, 1995 (age 30)	2019	(United States) New England Revolution (loan)	23	5
9	Chandler Hoffman	(United States)	FW	August 17, 1990 (age 35)	2019	(United States) Real Monarchs	19	5
10	Prosper Kasim	(Ghana)	FW	December 15, 1996 (age 29)	2019	(Sweden) IFK Göteborg	32	7
11	JJ Williams	(United States)	FW	January 4, 1998 (age 28)	2019	(United States) Columbus Crew SC (loan)	18	7
13	Tyler Savitsky	(United States)	FW	July 5, 1996 (age 29)	2019	(Denmark) Næstved	0	0
27	Edward Opoku	(Ghana)	FW	August 1, 1996 (age 29)	2019	(United States) Columbus Crew SC (loan)	18	2
88	Femi Hollinger-Janzen	(Benin)	FW	December 14, 1993 (age 32)	2019	(United States) New England Revolution	20	1

== Non-competitive ==
=== Preseason ===
Although Legion FC officially announced just one preseason game, the matchup against Nashville SC on February 16, the club wound up playing a four-game preseason schedule ahead of its inaugural season. Two of the four games were against fellow USL Championship clubs, with one fixture against a team from Major League Soccer and one against a USL League One opponent. The first two preseason matches saw Birmingham as the road team, with Legion FC hosting the final two games at BBVA Field.

February 2 Friendly	Tampa Bay Rowdies	1–0	Birmingham Legion	St. Petersburg, FL
	Allen	Report		Stadium: Al Lang Stadium; Attendance: 0

February 6 Friendly	Philadelphia Union	3–1	Birmingham Legion	Clearwater, FL
6:00 PM CST	Ilsinho 14'; Przybyłko 72'; Accam 85'	Report	Hoffman 7'; (yellow card) 79'	Stadium: Joe DiMaggio Sports Complex

February 13 Friendly	Birmingham Legion	3–1	Chattanooga Red Wolves	Birmingham, AL
3:00 PM CST	Hoffman; Kasim; Salazar	Report	Zayed	Stadium: BBVA Field

February 16 Friendly	Birmingham Legion	0–3	Nashville SC	Birmingham, AL
4:00 PM CST	(yellow card) 38'	Report	Lancaster 31'; Hume 60'; Davis (yellow card) 82'; Mensah 86'	Stadium: BBVA Field

== Competitive ==
=== USL Championship ===
==== Standings ====
Pos	Team	Pld	W	D	L	GF	GA	GD	Pts	Qualification
8	Ottawa Fury FC	34	14	10	10	50	43	+7	52	Play-In Round
9	Charleston Battery	34	11	13	10	44	44	0	46	Play-In Round
10	Birmingham Legion FC	34	12	7	15	35	51	−16	43	Play-In Round
11	Saint Louis FC	34	11	9	14	40	41	−1	42	
12	Loudoun United FC	34	11	6	17	59	65	−6	39	

Source: USL Championship Standings
Rules for classification: 1) total wins; 2) total goal differential; 3) total goals scored; 4) points earned against top four Conference finishers; 5) disciplinary points; 6) coin toss or drawing of lots

==== Results by round ====
Round	1	2	3	5	6	7	8	9	10	11	12	13	14	15	16	17	18	19	20	21	22	23	24	25	26	27	28	29	30	31	32	33	4	34
Stadium	H	H	A	A	H	H	A	A	H	A	H	H	A	A	H	A	A	H	H	H	A	A	H	A	A	A	H	A	H	A	H	A	H	H
Result	L	L	W	W	D	W	L	D	L	D	L	L	L	L	D	L	L	W	W	W	D	W	W	W	D	W	L	L	W	L	D		P	

Source: Birmingham schedule
A = Away; H = Home; W = Win; D = Draw; L = Loss

==== Match results ====
The league announced home openers for every club on December 14, 2018. Legion FC were initially set to play the inaugural match in club history on March 9, facing Bethlehem Steel FC at BBVA Field; the game would later be postponed to March 10 due to inclement weather.

The full Birmingham schedule was released on December 19. Legion FC's inaugural season will consist of 34 matches, with home and away games against every Eastern Conference opponent. The club will be one of six new teams in the Eastern Conference: Hartford Athletic, Loudoun United, and Memphis 901 are also joining as expansion clubs, while Saint Louis FC and Swope Park Rangers move over from the Western Conference.

March 10 1	Birmingham Legion	0–2	Bethlehem Steel FC	Birmingham, AL
4:00 PM CDT	Lopez (yellow card) 42'; Hollinger-Janzen (yellow card) 71'; Avila (yellow card) 90+5'	Report	Przybyłko 53'; Zandi 68'; Díaz (yellow card) 76'	Stadium: BBVA Field; Attendance: 5,807; Referee: Amin Hadzic
Note: The game was initially scheduled for March 9 but was postponed due to inclement weather.

March 16 2	Birmingham Legion	0–1	Ottawa Fury FC	Birmingham, AL
7:00 PM CDT	Lopez (yellow card) 38'; Culbertson (yellow card) 78'	Report	Haworth 16', (yellow card) 79'	Stadium: BBVA Field; Attendance: 4,234; Referee: Thomas Snyder

March 31 3	Louisville City	2–3	Birmingham Legion	Louisville, KY
9:00 AM CDT	Rasmussen 30'; Craig (yellow card) 47'; Laurent 81' (o.g.)	Report	Laurent (yellow card) 21'; Kasim 31'; Hoffman 36'; Wright 87'	Stadium: Louisville Slugger Field; Attendance: 6,811; Referee: Mike Lavergne
Note: The game was initially scheduled for March 30 but was postponed due to inclement weather.

April 6 4	Birmingham Legion	Postponed	New York Red Bulls II	Birmingham, AL
7:00 PM CDT		Report		Stadium: BBVA Field; Referee: Eric Tattersall
Note: The game was abandoned in the 17th minute due to inclement weather. NYRBII were leading, 1–0, on a goal in the 8th minute from Tom Barlow. The match was replayed in full on the rescheduled date.

April 13 5	Saint Louis FC	2–3	Birmingham Legion	Fenton, MO
7:30 PM CDT	Abend (yellow card) 37'; Rivas 63'; Fink 88' (pen.)	Report	Lopez (yellow card) 14'; Laurent 38'; Williams 75', 81'; Fisher (yellow card) 78'; Opoku (yellow card) 87'	Stadium: Toyota Stadium; Attendance: 3,635; Referee: Jervis Atagana

April 20 6	Birmingham Legion	0–0	Swope Park Rangers	Birmingham, AL
4:00 PM CDT	Fisher (yellow card) 38'; Culbertson (yellow card) 53'; Laurent (yellow card) 57'; Herivaux (yellow card) 72'	Report	Hernandez (yellow card) 44'	Stadium: BBVA Field; Attendance: 4,872; Referee: Elvis Osmanovic

April 27 7	Birmingham Legion	1–0	Loudoun United	Birmingham, AL
7:00 PM CDT	Johnson (yellow card) 19'; Herivaux (yellow card) 59'; Kasim 90+4', (yellow card) 90+4'	Report		Stadium: BBVA Field; Attendance: 4,713; Referee: Sergii Demianchuk

May 1 8	New York Red Bulls II	5–0	Birmingham Legion	Montclair, NJ
6:00 PM CDT	Etienne 23'; Nealis 55'; Jørgenson 57', 81'; Koffi (yellow card) 65'; Barlow 90'	Report	Culbertson (yellow card) 79'	Stadium: MSU Soccer Park at Pittser Field; Attendance: 467; Referee: Thomas Snyder

May 4 9	Memphis 901	2–2	Birmingham Legion	Memphis, TN
3:00 PM CDT	Metzger (yellow card) 27'; Lindley (yellow card) 34', (goal) 40'; Dally (yellow card) 60'; Muckette 86'; Burch (yellow card) 90+3'	Report	Avila (yellow card) 31'; Culbertson (yellow card) 59'; Johnson 84'; Hoffman 90+2' (pen.)	Stadium: AutoZone Park; Attendance: 4,563; Referee: Eric Tattersall

May 11 10	Birmingham Legion	0–3	Louisville City	Birmingham, AL
7:00 PM CDT		Report	Rasmussen 6'; Mkosana 24'; Spencer 53'	Stadium: BBVA Field; Attendance: 3,877; Referee: Matt Franz

May 18 11	North Carolina FC	0–0	Birmingham Legion	Cary, NC
6:00 PM CDT	Brotherton (yellow card) 89'	Report	Hollinger-Janzen (yellow card) 45'; Herivaux (yellow card) 88' (yellow-red card) 90+2'	Stadium: Sahlen's Stadium; Attendance: 5,448; Referee: Adam Kilpatrick

May 22 12	Birmingham Legion	0–1	Nashville SC	Birmingham, AL
7:00 PM CDT	Williams (yellow card) 58'	Report	Ríos 63' (pen.)	Stadium: BBVA Field; Attendance: 5,314; Referee: Elvis Osmanovic

June 1 13	Birmingham Legion	0–2	Tampa Bay Rowdies	Birmingham, AL
7:00 PM CDT	Lopez (yellow card) 28'; Kasim (yellow card) 69'	Report	Johnson (yellow card) 20'; Guenzatti 28'; Tinari 44'; Richards (yellow card) 71'	Stadium: BBVA Field; Attendance: 4,102; Referee: Matthew Thompson

June 8 14	Charleston Battery	3–1	Birmingham Legion	Charleston, SC
6:30 PM CDT	Piggott 25'; Daley (yellow card) 66'; Bosua 75' (pen.); Rittmeyer (yellow card) 81'; Paterson 90+3'	Report	Lopez 44'; Johnson (yellow card) 56'; Appiah (yellow card) 65'	Stadium: MUSC Health Stadium; Attendance: 3,456; Referee: Daniel Gutierrez

June 15 15	Charlotte Independence	4–1	Birmingham Legion	Matthews, NC
6:00 PM CDT	Gutman 7'; E. Martínez 48'; Herrera 60' (pen.), (yellow card) 70'; Mansally 65'	Report	Avila (yellow card) 12'; Kasim 26'; Culbertson (yellow card) 28'; Laurent (yellow card) 59'	Stadium: Sportsplex at Matthews; Attendance: 3,544; Referee: Gabriele Giusti

June 22 16	Birmingham Legion	2–2	Hartford Athletic	Birmingham, AL
7:00 PM CDT	Kobayashi (yellow card) 26'; Hoffman 31'; Fisher (yellow card) 42'; Lopez 52'; Turner (yellow card) 77'	Report	Swartz 14'; Gdula 43'; Jørgensen (yellow card) 62'; Rasmussen (yellow card) 89'; Curinga (yellow card) 90+7'	Stadium: BBVA Field; Attendance: 4,609; Referee: Eric Tattersall

June 26 17	Indy Eleven	3–0	Birmingham Legion	Indianapolis, IN
6:00 PM CDT	Pasher 7'; Osmond (yellow card) 32'; Laurent 44' (o.g.); Enevoldsen (yellow card) 82', (goal) 90+1'	Report	Mabiala (yellow card) 25'	Stadium: Lucas Oil Stadium; Attendance: 9,248; Referee: Ismir Pekmic

June 29 18	Pittsburgh Riverhounds SC	4–1	Birmingham Legion	Pittsburgh, PA
6:00 PM CDT	Dos Santos 13'; Mertz 25', 39'; Volesky 75'	Report	Avila (yellow card) 79'; Hoffman 83'	Stadium: Highmark Stadium; Attendance: 3,866; Referee: Thomas Snyder

July 13 19	Birmingham Legion	1–0	North Carolina FC	Birmingham, AL
7:00 PM CDT	Williams (yellow card) 45+1'; Wright 79', (yellow card) 90+4'	Report	Chester (yellow card) 52'; Fortune (yellow card) 54'	Stadium: BBVA Field; Attendance: 4,277; Referee: Luis Guardia

July 20 20	Birmingham Legion	4–0	Atlanta United 2	Birmingham, AL
7:00 PM CDT	Wright 5'; Laurent 39'; Johnson 89'; Kasim 90+5' (pen.)	Report		Stadium: BBVA Field; Attendance: 4,756; Referee: Elton García

July 27 21	Birmingham Legion	1–0	Charlotte Independence	Birmingham, AL
7:00 PM CDT	Williams 28'; Asiedu (yellow card) 45+2'; Lopez (yellow card) 90'; Opoku (yellow card) 90+2'	Report	George (yellow card) 90+1'	Stadium: BBVA Field; Attendance: 4,433; Referee: Lorant Varga

August 2 22	Ottawa Fury FC	0–0	Birmingham Legion	Ottawa, ON
6:00 PM CDT		Report	Lopez (yellow card) 74' (yellow-red card) 78'; Van Oekel (yellow card) 87'; Asiedu (yellow card) 90+3'	Stadium: TD Place Stadium; Attendance: 4,015; Referee: Mathieu Souaré

August 10 23	Tampa Bay Rowdies	0–1	Birmingham Legion	St. Petersburg, FL
6:30 PM CDT	Diakité (yellow card) 83'	Report	Opoku 49'; Wright (yellow card) 66'; Williams (yellow card) 70'; Culbertson (yellow card) 88'	Stadium: Al Lang Stadium; Attendance: 4,949; Referee: Dejan Susak

August 17 24	Birmingham Legion	1–0	Memphis 901	Birmingham, AL
7:00 PM CDT	Holland (yellow card) 37'; Ward (yellow card) 40'; Avila (yellow card) 68'; Johnson 90', (yellow card) 90+5'	Report	Metzger (yellow card) 5'	Stadium: BBVA Field; Attendance: 5,219; Referee: Matthew Franz

August 25 25	Bethlehem Steel FC	2–3	Birmingham Legion	Chester, PA
5:00 PM CDT	Zandi (yellow card) 42'; Santos (red card) 42'; Real (yellow card) 53'; Turner (yellow card) 56'; Ngalina 69'; Mbaizo 74' (pen.); Faris (red card) 77'	Report	Kasim 20'; Lopez (yellow card) 36', (goal) 76'; Herivaux (red card) 42'; Avila (yellow card) 54'; Williams 67'; Cromwell (yellow card) 73' (yellow-red card) 83'	Stadium: Talen Energy Stadium; Attendance: 357; Referee: Elijio Arreguin

August 28 26	Loudoun United	1–1	Birmingham Legion	Leesburg, VA
6:30 PM CDT	Murphy 47'; Alvarez (yellow card) 57'; Amoh (yellow card) 73'	Report	Williams 32', (yellow card) 69'	Stadium: Segra Field; Attendance: 1,007; Referee: Tori Penso

September 4 27	Atlanta United 2	0–5	Birmingham Legion	Kennesaw, GA
6:30 PM CDT	Reilly (yellow card) 37'; Okonkwo (yellow card) 84'	Report	Wright 3'; Williams 43'; Johnson 51'; Asiedu (yellow card) 76'; Kasim 81' (pen.); Culbertson 88'	Stadium: Fifth Third Bank Stadium; Attendance: 1,223; Referee: John Griggs

September 13 28	Birmingham Legion	0–2	Saint Louis FC	Birmingham, AL
7:00 PM CDT	Ward (yellow card) 38'; Asiedu (yellow card) 74'; Lopez (yellow card) 78'	Report	Bahner (yellow card) 22'; Blackwood 42', 72'; Kavita (yellow card) 62'; Greig (yellow card) 75'	Stadium: BBVA Field; Attendance: 4,412; Referee: Adam Kilpatrick

September 17 29	Nashville SC	1–0	Birmingham Legion	Nashville, TN
7:00 PM CDT	Tribbett (yellow card) 2'; King (yellow card) 45+2'; Ward 90+3' (o.g.)	Report	Williams (yellow card) 36'	Stadium: First Tennessee Park; Attendance: 5,702; Referee: Matthew Thompson

September 20 30	Birmingham Legion	1–0	Indy Eleven	Birmingham, AL
7:00 PM CDT	Wright 39'; Asiedu (yellow card) 77'	Report	Conner (red card) 53'; Ayoze (yellow card) 83'	Stadium: BBVA Field; Attendance: 4,062; Referee: Greg Dopka

September 30 31	Swope Park Rangers	3–1	Birmingham Legion	Kansas City, KS
7:00 PM CDT	Harris 7'; Allach 28' (pen.), (yellow card) 65'; Lepley (yellow card) 77'; Zé Pedro 79'; Dick (yellow card) 90'	Report	Williams 45'; Culbertson (yellow card) 62'; Wright (red card) 76'; Asiedu (yellow card) 80'	Stadium: Children's Mercy Park; Attendance: 369; Referee: Lorant Varga

October 5 32	Birmingham Legion	0–0	Charleston Battery	Birmingham, AL
7:00 PM CDT	Herivaux (yellow card) 60'; Ugarte (yellow card) 70'; Culbertson (yellow card) 90+1'; Fisher (yellow card) 90+3'	Report	Guerra (yellow card) 53' (yellow-red card) 59'; Paterson (yellow card) 67'	Stadium: BBVA Field; Referee: Mark Allatin

October 9 33	Hartford Athletic	4–0	Birmingham Legion	Hartford, CT
7:00 PM CDT	Angulo 56'; Bedoya 62' de Wit (yellow card) 74'; Barrera 81'; Wojcik 86'	Report	Lopez (yellow card) 70'	Stadium: Dillon Stadium; Attendance: 2,746; Referee: Ismir Pekmic

October 16 4	Birmingham Legion	2–1	New York Red Bulls II	Birmingham, AL
7:00 PM CDT	Wright 10'; Williams (yellow card) 28'; Culbertson (red card) 42'; Kasim (yellow card) 45+2', (goal) 46'; Johnson (yellow card) 80'	Report	Koffi (yellow card) 45+5'; Fisher 68' (o.g.); Kilwien (yellow card) 87'	Stadium: BBVA Field; Attendance: 3,824; Referee: Elton García
Note: The game was abandoned in the 17th minute due to inclement weather. NYRBII were leading, 1–0, on a goal in the 8th minute from Tom Barlow. The match was replayed in full on the rescheduled date.

October 20 34	Birmingham Legion	0–1	Pittsburgh Riverhounds SC	Birmingham, AL
3:30 PM CDT	Ugarte (yellow card) 56'	Report	Greenspan (yellow card) 71'; Forrest 90'	Stadium: BBVA Field; Referee: Kevin Broadley

==== USL Cup Playoffs ====
October 23 Play-In	North Carolina FC	2–3	Birmingham Legion FC	Cary, NC
19:00 EDT	Albadawi 19', (yellow card) 40'; Fortune 59', (yellow card) 61'	Report	Hollinger-Janzen 35'; Herivaux 66'; Williams 90+3'	Stadium: Sahlen's Stadium at WakeMed Soccer Park; Attendance: 3,675; Referee: Tim Ford

October 26 Conference Quarterfinals	Pittsburgh Riverhounds SC	7–0	Birmingham Legion FC	Pittsburgh, PA
7:00 PM EDT	Brett 13', 27', 34' (pen.), 71'; Fisher 17' (o.g.); Dover 45+1'; Mertz 62' (pen.); Adewole (yellow card) 77'	Report	Culbertson (yellow card) 31'; Lopez (yellow card) 41'; Herivaux (red card) 61'	Stadium: Highmark Stadium; Referee: Mark Allatin

=== U.S. Open Cup ===
As a member of the USL Championship, Birmingham Legion will enter the tournament in the second round, to be played May 15, 2019.

May 15 Second round	Birmingham Legion (Alabama)	4–1	(Pennsylvania) West Chester United	Birmingham, AL
7:00 PM CDT	Hoffman 22' (pen.); Hollinger-Janzen 38'; Kasim 51'; Opoku 89'	Report	Wilson 61'	Stadium: BBVA Field; Attendance: 3,307; Referee: Sergii Demianchuk

May 29 Third round	Louisville City (Kentucky)	1–0	(Alabama) Birmingham Legion	Louisville, KY
6:00 PM CDT	Totsch 90' (pen.); Francis (yellow card) 90+5'	Report	Hollinger-Janzen (yellow card) 21'; Culbertson (yellow card) 82'; Van Oekel (yellow card) 89'	Stadium: Dr. Mark & Cindy Lynn Stadium; Attendance: 1,403; Referee: Kevin Fikar

== Statistics ==
=== Appearances and goals ===
No.	Pos	Nat	Player	Total		USLC		U.S. Open Cup	
No.	Pos	Nat	Player	Apps	Goals	Apps	Goals	Apps	Goals
0	GK	(United States) USA	Joe Nasco	0	0	0	0	0	0
1	GK	(United States) USA	Matt Van Oekel	27	0	26	0	1	0
2	MF	(United States) USA	Marcos Ugarte	7	0	1+4	0	2	0
3	DF	(United States) USA	Kyle Fisher	21	0	18+3	0	0	0
5	MF	(United States) USA	Mikey Lopez	26	3	24+2	3	0	0
6	MF	(Ghana) GHA	Anderson Asiedu	12	0	11+1	0	0	0
7	FW	(Canada) CAN	Brian Wright	23	5	20+3	5	0	0
8	MF	(England) ENG	Joe Holland	15	0	3+10	0	1+1	0
9	FW	(United States) USA	Chandler Hoffman	19	5	15+2	4	2	1
10	FW	(Ghana) GHA	Prosper Kasim	32	7	29+1	6	2	1
11	FW	(United States) USA	JJ Williams	18	7	16+2	7	0	0
12	DF	(United States) USA	Eric Avila	29	0	23+4	0	1+1	0
13	FW	(United States) USA	Tyler Savitsky	0	0	0	0	0	0
14	MF	(United States) USA	Daniel Johnson	31	4	24+5	4	0+2	0
15	DF	(United States) USA	Akeem Ward	10	0	9+1	0	0	0
16	MF	(Japan) JPN	Daigo Kobayashi	19	0	11+7	0	1	0
17	DF	(France) FRA	Gael Mabiala	11	0	3+7	0	1	0
18	GK	(United States) USA	Trevor Spangenberg	6	0	5	0	1	0
21	MF	(Haiti) HAI	Zachary Herivaux	19	0	18+1	0	0	0
22	DF	(Canada) CAN	Mathieu Laurent	27	2	24+1	2	1+1	0
23	DF	(United States) USA	Benjamin Kucera	4	0	0+3	0	1	0
27	FW	(Ghana) GHA	Edward Opoku	18	2	5+12	1	1	1
30	DF	(Ghana) GHA	Razak Cromwell	19	0	12+5	0	2	0
33	DF	(United States) USA	Kyle Culbertson	29	1	23+4	1	1+1	0
88	FW	(Benin) BEN	Femi Hollinger-Janzen	20	1	11+7	0	2	1
Players who left Birmingham during the season:
4	DF	(Germany) GER	Marcel Appiah	3	0	3	0	0	0
96	DF	(United States) USA	Tyler Turner	14	0	7+5	0	2	0

Source: Birmingham stats

=== Disciplinary record ===
No.	Pos.	Name	USLC		U.S. Open Cup		Total	
No.	Pos.	Name	Booked	Sent off (straight red)	Booked	Sent off (straight red)	Booked	Sent off (straight red)
1	GK	(United States) Matt Van Oekel	1	0	1	0	2	0
2	MF	(United States) Marcos Ugarte	1	0	0	0	1	0
3	DF	(United States) Kyle Fisher	4	0	0	0	4	0
5	MF	(United States) Mikey Lopez	7	1	0	0	7	1
6	MF	(Ghana) Anderson Asiedu	6	0	0	0	6	0
7	FW	(Canada) Brian Wright	2	1	0	0	2	1
8	MF	(England) Joe Holland	1	0	0	0	1	0
10	FW	(Ghana) Prosper Kasim	2	0	0	0	2	0
11	FW	(United States) JJ Williams	5	0	0	0	5	0
12	DF	(United States) Eric Avila	6	0	0	0	6	0
14	MF	(United States) Daniel Johnson	3	0	0	0	3	0
15	DF	(United States) Akeem Ward	2	0	0	0	2	0
16	MF	(Japan) Daigo Kobayashi	1	0	0	0	1	0
17	DF	(France) Gael Mabiala	1	0	0	0	1	0
21	MF	(Haiti) Zachary Herivaux	3	2	0	0	3	2
22	DF	(Canada) Mathieu Laurent	3	0	0	0	3	0
27	FW	(Ghana) Edward Opoku	2	0	0	0	2	0
30	DF	(Ghana) Razak Cromwell	0	1	0	0	0	1
33	DF	(United States) Kyle Culbertson	8	0	1	0	9	0
88	FW	(Benin) Femi Hollinger-Janzen	2	0	1	0	3	0
Players who left Birmingham during the season:
4	DF	(Germany) Marcel Appiah	1	0	0	0	1	0
96	DF	(United States) Tyler Turner	1	0	0	0	1	0

Source: Birmingham stats

=== Clean sheets ===
No.	Name	USLC	U.S. Open Cup	Total	Games Played		
No.	Name	0	(United States) Joe Nasco	0	0	0	0
1	(United States) Matt Van Oekel	11	0	11	27		
18	(United States) Trevor Spangenberg	1	0	1	6		

Source: Birmingham stats

== Transfers ==
=== In ===
Pos.	Player	Transferred from	Fee/notes	Date	Source
FW	(United States) Chandler Hoffman	(United States) Real Monarchs	Signed to a multi-year pre-contract, effective Jan 1, 2019.	Jul 30, 2018	
MF	(United States) Mikey Lopez	(United States) San Antonio FC	Signed to a multi-year contract.	Nov 13, 2018	
MF	(England) Joe Holland	(United States) Pittsburgh Riverhounds SC	Terms of the contract were undisclosed.	Nov 20, 2018	
GK	(United States) Matt Van Oekel	(United States) OKC Energy	OKC receives an undisclosed fee. Signed to a multi-year contract.	Dec 12, 2018	
MF	(United States) Marcos Ugarte	(Denmark) Ringkøbing	Terms of the contract were undisclosed.	Dec 19, 2018	
DF	(United States) Eric Avila	(United States) Las Vegas Lights	Terms of the contract were undisclosed.	Dec 21, 2018	
FW	(Ghana) Prosper Kasim	(Sweden) IFK Göteborg	Signed to a multi-year contract.	Jan 2, 2019	
FW	(Benin) Femi Hollinger-Janzen	(United States) New England Revolution	Signed to a multi-year contract.	Jan 7, 2019	
DF	(Germany) Marcel Appiah	(Germany) VfL Osnabrück	Signed to a multi-year contract.	Jan 9, 2019	
DF	(United States) Kyle Fisher	(Canada) Montreal Impact	Signed to a multi-year contract.	Jan 17, 2019	
MF	(Japan) Daigo Kobayashi	(United States) Las Vegas Lights	Terms of the contract were undisclosed.	Jan 21, 2019	
DF	(Canada) Mathieu Laurent	(United States) UAB Blazers	Terms of the contract were undisclosed.	Jan 28, 2019	
DF	(France) Gael Mabiala	(United States) UAB Blazers	Terms of the contract were undisclosed.	Jan 28, 2019	
MF	(United States) Daniel Johnson	(United States) Chicago Fire	Signed to a multi-year contract.	Feb 15, 2019	
DF	(United States) Tyler Turner	(United States) Orlando SeaWolves	Signed to a multi-year contract.	Feb 20, 2019	
GK	(United States) Trevor Spangenberg	(United States) Richmond Kickers	Signed to a multi-year contract.	Feb 21, 2019	
DF	(United States) Benjamin Kucera	(United States) Birmingham Hammers	Terms of the contract were undisclosed.	Feb 27, 2019	
FW	(United States) Tyler Savitsky	(Denmark) Næstved	Terms of the contract were undisclosed.	Feb 27, 2019	
DF	(United States) Kyle Culbertson	(United States) Saint Louis FC	Signed to a multi-year contract.	Mar 7, 2019	
GK	(United States) Joe Nasco	(United States) Fort Lauderdale Strikers	Terms of the contract were undisclosed.		
MF	(Ghana) Anderson Asiedu	(United States) Atlanta United FC	Terms of the contract were undisclosed.	Jul 15, 2019	
DF	(United States) Akeem Ward	(United States) D.C. United	Terms of the contract were undisclosed.	Jul 30, 2019	

=== Loan in ===
Pos.	Player	Parent club	Length/Notes	Beginning	End	Source
DF	(Ghana) Razak Cromwell	(Ghana) Dreams FC	Duration of the 2019 USL Championship season, with an option to buy.	Nov 27, 2018		
MF	(Haiti) Zachary Herivaux	(United States) New England Revolution	On a match-by-match basis.	Mar 14, 2019	May 25, 2019	
MF	(Haiti) Zachary Herivaux	(United States) New England Revolution	On a match-by-match basis.	Jul 13, 2019		
FW	(Canada) Brian Wright	(United States) New England Revolution	On a match-by-match basis.	Mar 14, 2019	Apr 18, 2019	
FW	(Canada) Brian Wright	(United States) New England Revolution	On a match-by-match basis.	May 18, 2019		
FW	(Ghana) Edward Opoku	(United States) Columbus Crew SC	Duration of the 2019 USL Championship season.	Mar 22, 2019		
FW	(United States) JJ Williams	(United States) Columbus Crew SC	On a match-by-match basis.	Apr 12, 2019	Apr 20, 2019	
FW	(United States) JJ Williams	(United States) Columbus Crew SC	On a match-by-match basis.	May 9, 2019	Jun 23, 2019	
FW	(United States) JJ Williams	(United States) Columbus Crew SC	On a match-by-match basis.	Jul 13, 2019		

=== Out ===
Pos.	Player	Transferred to	Fee/notes	Date	Source
DF	(Germany) Marcel Appiah	(Germany) VfR Aalen	No longer listed on roster. Signed for Aalen on Jul 30, 2019.	Jul 22, 2019	
DF	(United States) Tyler Turner		Contract terminated by mutual consent.	Aug 14, 2019	

== Awards ==
USLC Team of the Week
Week	Starters	Bench	Opponent(s)	Link
4	(Canada) Brian Wright	(United States) Eric Avila	Louisville City	
6	(United States) JJ Williams	(United States) Kyle Culbertson	Saint Louis FC	
9	(United States) Daniel Johnson		New York Red Bulls II; Memphis 901	
16		(United States) Mikey Lopez	Hartford Athletic	
19	(Canada) Brian Wright		North Carolina FC	
20	(Canada) Mathieu Laurent		Atlanta United 2	
21	(United States) Mikey Lopez		Charlotte Independence	
23	(Ghana) Edward Opoku	(United States) Matt Van Oekel	Tampa Bay Rowdies	
24	(United States) Daniel Johnson		Memphis 901	
25		(Ghana) Prosper Kasim	Bethlehem Steel FC	
27	(United States) Eric Avila (United States) Mikey Lopez	(Ghana) Prosper Kasim	Atlanta United 2	
29		(Ghana) Prosper Kasim	Nashville SC; Indy Eleven	

USLC Goal of the Month
Month	Player	Opponent	Link
June	(United States) Chandler Hoffman	Hartford Athletic	

USLC Coach of the Month
Month	Coach	Link
July	(United States) Tom Soehn	

USLC Goal of the Week
Week	Player	Opponent	Link
16	(United States) Chandler Hoffman	Hartford Athletic	

== Kits ==
Home	Away

Type	Shirt	Shorts	Socks	First appearance / Record
Home	Black	Black	Black	Match 1 vs. Bethlehem / 6–2–8
Away	White	White	White	Match 3 vs. Louisville / 6–5–6

== See also ==
- Birmingham Legion FC
- 2019 in American soccer
- 2019 USL Championship season
