= JJ Williams (soccer) =

American soccer player (born 1998)

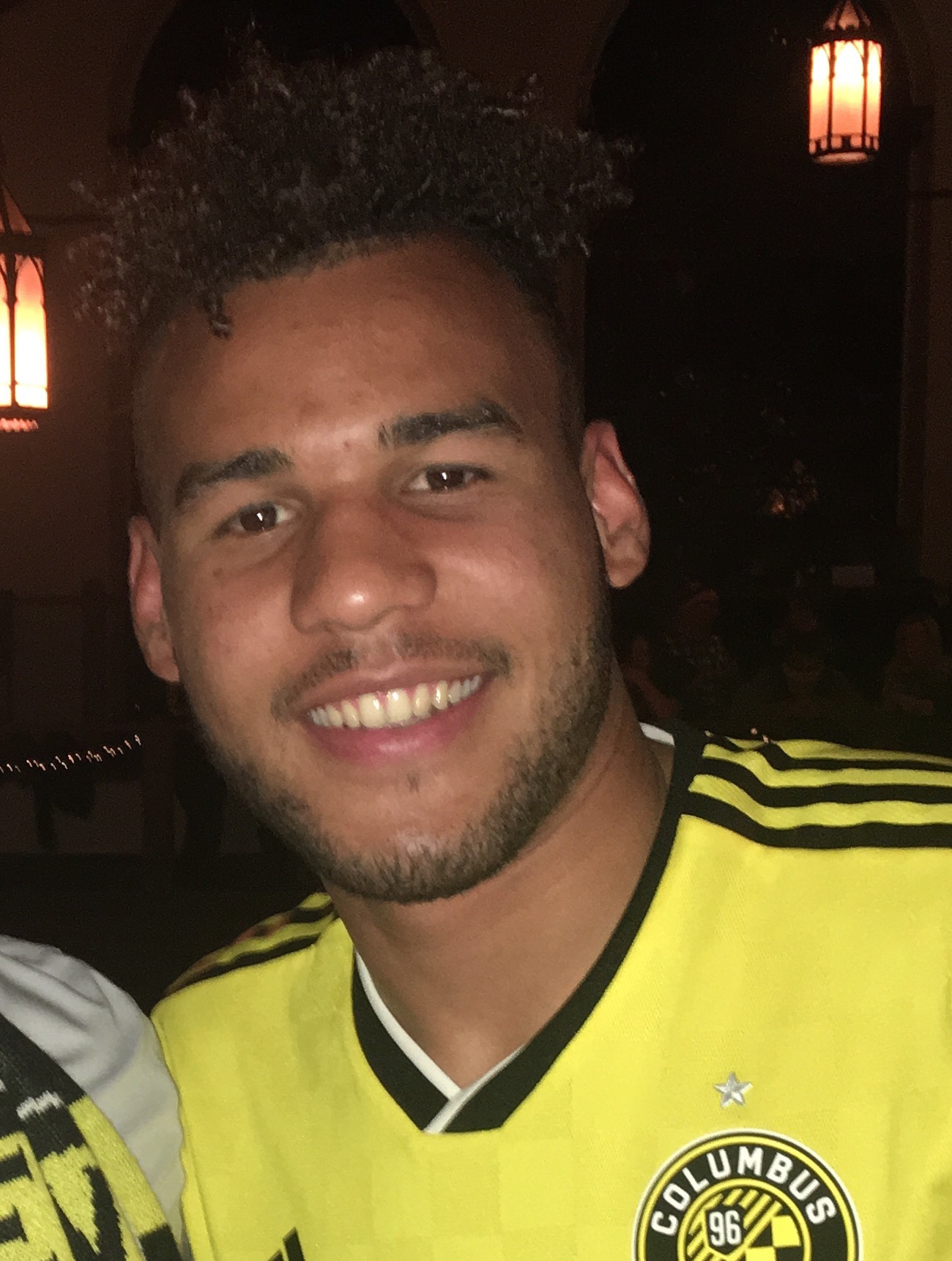
- Williams at a Columbus Crew SC event in 2019

Personal information
- Full name: Jerome Williams Jr.
- Date of birth: January 4, 1998 (age 28)
- Place of birth: Clovis, New Mexico, U.S.
- Height: 6 ft 4 in (1.93 m)
- Position: Forward

Team information
- Current team: Heart of Midlothian
- Number: 9

Youth career
- 2007–20??: Capital City Streaks
- –2016: Vestavia Hills SC

College career
Years	Team	Apps	(Gls)
2016–2018	Kentucky Wildcats	57	(24)

Senior career*
Years	Team	Apps	(Gls)
2016	Birmingham Hammers	5	(0)
2017	Reading United	7	(1)
2018	Dayton Dutch Lions	12	(7)
2019	Columbus Crew	7	(0)
2019	→ Birmingham Legion (loan)	21	(7)
2020	Atlanta United	1	(0)
2020	Atlanta United 2	1	(0)
2020	→ Birmingham Legion (loan)	4	(0)
2021	Birmingham Legion	27	(5)
2022	FC Tulsa	22	(9)
2022	Phoenix Rising	13	(3)
2023	Tampa Bay Rowdies	31	(12)
2024–2026	Rhode Island FC	45	(13)
2026–	Heart of Midlothian	8	(0)
- * Club domestic league appearances and goals as of 22 November 2026

Jerome Williams Jr. (born January 4, 1998), known as JJ Williams, is an American professional soccer player who plays for Scottish Premiership side Heart of Midlothian, as a forward. He previously appeared at the semi-professional level for Birmingham Hammers, Reading United, and Dayton Dutch Lions and as a professional with Columbus Crew, Atlanta United, Atlanta United 2, Birmingham Legion, FC Tulsa, Phoenix Rising, Tampa Bay Rowdies and Rhode Island.

Although he was born in Clovis, New Mexico, Williams grew up in Montgomery, Alabama, and attended Alabama Christian Academy. After scoring 122 goals while in high school, he spent three years playing at the University of Kentucky. Williams was a first team all-American and the C-USA Men's Soccer Player of the Year in 2018. He also spent time during the collegiate offseason with Birmingham Hammers, Reading United, and Dayton Dutch Lions. Williams signed a Generation Adidas contract with Major League Soccer ahead of the 2019 MLS SuperDraft and was selected in the first round by Columbus Crew. He spent most of his rookie year on loan to Birmingham Legion before being waived by the Crew ahead of the 2020 season, eventually finding his way to Atlanta United.

== Early life ==
Born in Clovis, New Mexico, Williams moved to Alabama as a child and grew up in Montgomery. He began playing soccer at the age of nine, joining the Capital City Streaks youth club and playing for regional Olympic Development Program teams. Williams attended Alabama Christian Academy, playing three years on varsity for the Eagles. He combined for 57 goals across his sophomore and junior seasons before breaking out as a senior with 65 goals and 20 assists. Williams was a two-time All-Metro player of the year in Montgomery and was named as the 2016 AHSAA Boys Soccer Player of the Year.

At club level, Williams appeared for Vestavia Hills Soccer Club, winning three State Cup championships. He committed to play college soccer at the University of Kentucky, one of seven members of the 2016 class for the Wildcats.

=== Birmingham Hammers ===
Following his high school graduation, and before joining the team at Kentucky, Williams spent time in the National Premier Soccer League with expansion club Birmingham Hammers. He was not initially on the roster, but was added midway through the 2016 season and made his debut on June 12 against Nashville FC. In his second match for the Hammers, Williams was sent off in the 72nd minute of a 2–0 defeat against Chattanooga FC after a collision with Chattanooga goalkeeper Greg Hartley. He finished the season with five appearances for Birmingham.

== College and amateur ==
On August 26, 2016, Williams came off the bench to make his Kentucky debut in a 4–0 victory against Marquette. He made 18 appearances on the season, tallying three goals and three assists while primarily coming off the bench. Williams scored his first collegiate goal on October 5, a 73rd-minute strike in a 3–1 victory over Evansville. He added his first NCAA tournament goal on November 20, albeit in a 3–2 loss to Creighton in the second round. At the end of the season, he was named to the Conference USA All-Freshman Team. As a sophomore, Williams tied for the team lead in goals, with three, and added four assists in 17 appearances. He started just once on the season, but scored a penalty kick as part of a 1–1 draw with nationally ranked Xavier on September 20, 2017. Although the Wildcats were eliminated in the first round of the 2017 Conference USA Men's Soccer Tournament, Williams was named Third Team All-CUSA.

Williams broke out as a junior to become "perhaps the nation's top attacking threat", tallying 18 goals and eight assists in 22 matches. He scored two goals in a match four times, notably against Louisville on September 4, 2018, and against Portland in the second round of the NCAA Tournament. The goals against Portland capped off a stretch of nine goals in nine games for Williams. In leading the Wildcats to the C-USA regular season and tournament titles, he was named as the C-USA Player of the Year, Offensive MVP, and Tournament MVP. His 18 goals were third-most in the nation and a Kentucky single-season record. He was named as a finalist for the Hermann Trophy but lost out on the award to Andrew Gutman of Indiana. Williams departed Kentucky following the season, ending his collegiate career with 24 goals and 15 assists from 57 appearances.

=== Reading United ===
Ahead of his sophomore season at Kentucky, Williams joined Premier Development League club Reading United. He made his debut on May 13, 2017, playing nine minutes in a 3–1 victory over Lehigh Valley United. Williams scored his first Reading goal on May 20, a tally two minutes into second half stoppage time in a 3–2 defeat against New York Red Bulls U-23. He primarily appeared off the bench during the remainder of the season, closing his time with Reading with one goal from seven appearances.

=== Dayton Dutch Lions ===
Williams returned to the Premier Development League ahead of his junior collegiate season, joining up with Dayton Dutch Lions. He debuted for the club on May 18, 2018, playing the full 90 minutes in a 1–1 draw against West Virginia Alliance. On his fifth appearance, he scored his first goal for the Dutch Lions, a 19th-minute tally in a 3–1 defeat to Lansing United on June 9. After scoring just once in his first eight games for the club, Williams pounded in seven goals in his last five appearances. Beginning with a two-goal game against Derby City Rovers on June 27, he added a goal against Cincinnati Dutch Lions on July 3 and scored a hat trick against Cincinnati on July 13. He added a goal in the playoffs against Chicago FC United, although Dayton fell by a 5–3 scoreline. Williams scored eight times in 13 appearances during his lone season with the Dutch Lions.

== Professional career ==
=== Columbus and loan to Birmingham ===
Ahead of the 2019 MLS Combine, Williams signed a Generation Adidas (GA) contract with Major League Soccer (MLS). He was selected by Columbus Crew with the 18th overall pick in the 2019 MLS SuperDraft. Williams made his professional and Crew debut on March 23, coming off the bench against Philadelphia Union. He received praise for bringing "some energy to the field" in his 35 minutes of action.

In order to get game minutes throughout the season, Williams spent multiple spells on loan with USL Championship expansion club Birmingham Legion FC. The first of those loan spells was announced on April 12, with Williams making his debut for the Legion the next day. He replaced Chandler Hoffman in the 52nd minute against Saint Louis FC, going on to score his first two professional goals in a six-minute span to help Birmingham earn a 3–2 victory. After a two-week spell back in Columbus, Williams rejoined the Legion on May 9. He again returned to the Crew in late June, playing in four straight games as Gyasi Zardes was on international duty. On July 13, the Crew confirmed that Williams would be sent back to Birmingham for a third stint. He spent the remainder of the 2019 season with the Legion, helping the club qualify for the 2019 USL Championship Playoffs. In the Eastern Conference play-in match against North Carolina FC, Williams provided the winning goal: his strike three minutes into stoppage time handed Birmingham a 3–2 victory in their first-ever playoff game.

On the season, Williams made nine appearances in Columbus and tallied eight goals from 23 matches with Birmingham. He was waived by the Crew on February 20, 2020. A lack of potential playing time, with Williams sitting fourth on the depth chart at the forward position, was cited by the club as the reason behind the move.

=== Atlanta United and loan spells ===
Although Williams had been waived by the Crew, his rights were still owned by Major League Soccer for another year, owing to his Generation Adidas contract. After passing through the league's waiver system on February 27, it was announced that he would return to Birmingham Legion for the 2020 season, officially on a loan from MLS. The league retained the ability to recall Williams at any time if an MLS club had committed to signing him, and they exercised that right exactly one week later. On March 5, he instead joined Atlanta United, arriving as a replacement for the injured Josef Martínez. Williams made his lone appearance for the club on July 16 in the MLS is Back Tournament, receiving a red card in second-half stoppage time in a 1–0 loss against FC Cincinnati.

After playing once while on loan at Atlanta United 2, a 45-minute spell in a victory against Philadelphia Union II, Williams returned on loan to Birmingham Legion for the remainder of the 2020 season. He made his second debut for the club on September 12, appearing off the bench in a 3–1 defeat against Charlotte Independence. Williams finished the pandemic-shortened season with one appearance for Atlanta United, one for Atlanta United 2, and five appearances while in Birmingham. He was left out of Atlanta's preliminary squad for the resumption of the 2020 CONCACAF Champions League and subsequently had his contract option declined on November 24.

=== Birmingham Legion ===
After two previous loan spells in Birmingham, Williams signed permanently for the Legion on January 19, 2021. In the announcement press release, he expressed his excitement "to give [his] full focus to one team." On his third debut for the club, Williams picked up a red card in the season opener against Indy Eleven. He tallied five goals and four assists from 28 appearances in all competitions, helping Birmingham qualify for the 2021 USL Championship Playoffs. Those stats featured a pair of goal-and-assist games, including as part of a 3–1 victory against Atlanta United 2, his former club, on August 4. Following the season, Williams had his contract option declined by Birmingham.

=== FC Tulsa ===
On January 27, 2022, Williams signed elsewhere in the Championship with FC Tulsa.

=== Phoenix Rising ===
On July 27, 2022, Williams was traded to fellow Championship club Phoenix Rising FC in exchange for Marcus Epps. In the press release announcing the move, Rising head coach Rick Schantz said that Williams was "a player we’ve watched for a long time...He will help us immediately."

=== Tampa Bay Rowdies ===
Williams signed with the Tampa Bay Rowdies on January 11, 2023.

=== Rhode Island FC ===
Williams was unveiled as the first forward on Rhode Island FC's inaugural squad on December 4, 2023. Williams missed the beginning of the 2024 season due to injury, and debuted on May 11 against Sacramento Republic FC. Williams' importance to the team increased over the course of the season, and he finished with 6 regular-season goals and 6 assists. Williams scored a first-half hat trick in Rhode Island's 8–1 season finale win against Miami FC, and followed up by scoring all three team goals in their first playoff game at Indy Eleven. With two additional playoff goals, Williams tied for the team lead with eleven goals across all competitions, and helped lead the team to the 2024 USL Eastern Conference Championship. He was named USL Championship Player of the Month for October 2024.

Williams again tied for the team lead in goals scored in all competitions in 2025, with a team-lead 6 in the regular season and 8 overall. Had his goal against Miami FC not been wiped out due to a Miami forfeit, he would have led the team in total goals scored in all competitions. Williams appeared in 18 regular-season games including the forfeit, missing time in the mid-season due to injury.

In a highlight of his 2026 season, Williams scored a tying goal in late in second-half stoppage time in a U.S. Open Cup match against the New England Revolution, sending the game to extra time and penalties. In August, he was reported as a potential transfer target for Heart of Midlothian F.C., and was subsequently transferred for a "club-record transfer fee" on August 25. At point of his departure, he was leading the team with 11 goals in all competitions, across 23 total competitive matches. Williams ranked first in Rhode Island FC history with 30 goals and two hat tricks across all competitions, and second with 13 assists. He also led the club with 11 selections to the USL Championship Team of the Week.

=== Heart of Midlothian ===
Williams' transfer was announced by Heart of Midlothian on August 25, 2026, and he made his team debut in the 71st minute in Hearts' derby game with Hibernian FC on September 3, 2026. He scored his first goal for Hearts against Stenhousemuir in the League Cup.

== Personal life ==
Williams is the youngest of four siblings. He is married to Hailey Williams, a former gymnast at Kentucky. The couple has two sons, Jerome Williams III and Rhodes Guy Williams.

While in high school, Williams also played basketball and was on the bass fishing team at Alabama Christian. He additionally played American football as a child before committing to soccer.

== Career statistics ==
As of 22 November 2026

Appearances and goals by club, season and competition
Club	Season	League			Cup (Note: All appearances in the U.S. Open Cup)		Continental		Other		Total	
Club	Season	Division	Apps	Goals	Apps	Goals	Apps	Goals	Apps	Goals	Apps	Goals
Birmingham Hammers	2016	NPSL	5	0	—		—		—		5	0
Reading United	2017	PDL	7	1	0	0	—		0	0	7	1
Dayton Dutch Lions	2018	PDL	12	7	—		—		1 (Note: Appearance in the PDL playoffs)	1	13	8
Columbus Crew	2019	Major League Soccer	7	0	2	0	—		—		9	0
Birmingham Legion (loan)	2019	USL Championship	21	7	0	0	—		2 (Note: Appearance(s) in the USL Championship playoffs)	1	23	8
Atlanta United	2020	Major League Soccer	1	0	—		0	0	—		1	0
Atlanta United 2 (loan)	2020	USL Championship	1	0	—		—		—		1	0
Birmingham Legion (loan)	2020	USL Championship	4	0	—		—		1	0	5	0
Birmingham Legion	2021	USL Championship	27	5	—		—		1	0	28	5
Birmingham Legion	Total		31	5	0	0	0	0	2	0	33	5
FC Tulsa	2022	USL Championship	22	9	2	0	—		—		24	9
Phoenix Rising	2022	USL Championship	13	3	0	0	—		—		13	3
Tampa Bay Rowdies	2023	USL Championship	31	12	2	1	—		1	0	34	13
Rhode Island FC	2024	USL Championship	26	6					3	5	29	11
Rhode Island FC	2025	USL Championship	18	7	1	0			3	0	22	7
Heart of Midlothian	2026–2027	Scottish Premiership	8	0	1	1	3	0	0	0	12	1
Career total			203	57	8	2	3	0	12	7	226	66

== Honors ==
Kentucky

- Conference USA (regular season): 2018
- Conference USA Men's Soccer Tournament: 2018

Dayton Dutch Lions

- Great Lakes Division: 2018

Individual

- C-USA All-Freshman Team: 2016
- Third Team All-CUSA: 2017
- First team All-America: 2018
- Conference USA Men's Soccer Player of the Year: 2018
- C-USA Offensive Player of the Year: 2018
- C-USA Tournament MVP: 2018
