= Gerry Williams =

Gerry Williams may refer to:

- Gerry Williams (artist) (1926–2014), American ceramist and magazine co-founder and publisher
- Gerry Williams (footballer) (1877–1901), Australian rules footballer for St Kilda
- Gerry Williams, see List of Tales of the Unexpected episodes

== See also ==
- Jerry Williams (disambiguation)
- Gerard Williams (disambiguation)
- Jeremy Williams (disambiguation)
- Jerome Williams (disambiguation)
