= Jerry Williams =

Jerry Williams may refer to:

== Music ==
- Jerry Lynn Williams (1948–2005), guitarist and songwriter
- Jerry Williams, Jr. or Swamp Dogg (born 1942), American R&B singer, songwriter and producer
- Jerry Williams (singer) (1942–2018), Swedish singer and actor
- Jerry Williams (radio) (1923–2003), American radio host
- Jerry Williams, founder of American band Harvest in 1977
- Jerry Williams (English singer) (born 1995), English singer-songwriter

== Sports ==
- Jerry Williams (footballer) (born 1960), English professional footballer
- Jerry Williams (American football) (1923–1998), American footballer
- Jerry Williams (basketball) (born 1979), American basketballer

== Other people ==
- Jerry Williams (born 1985), Nollywood actor
- Jerry Williams (politician) (active since 2001), American politician in Kansas
- Jerry Michael Williams (1969–2000), American murder victim

== See also ==
- Jerry Coleby-Williams, Australian conservationist, horticulturalist and plant curator, since 1999 TV-presenter
- Gerard Williams (disambiguation)
- Gerry Williams (disambiguation)
- Jeremy Williams (disambiguation)
- Jerome Williams (disambiguation)
