= Gerald Williams =

Gerald Williams may refer to:

- Gerald Williams (baseball) (1966–2022), former American Major League Baseball outfielder
- Gerald Williams (American football) (born 1963), former American football defensive lineman
- Gerald Williams (politician) (1903–1989), British politician
- Gerald Williams (rugby league) (born 1969), South African international
- Gerald Williams (rugby union) (born 1954), Welsh rugby union player
- Gerald Evan Williams (1907–1949), American Air Force officer
- Gerald Williams (tennis commentator) (1929–2016), British sports commentator
- Gerald Williams (artist), American artist

== See also ==
- Gerry Williams (disambiguation)
- Gerard Williams (disambiguation)
