= Edward Opoku =

Association football player (born 1997)

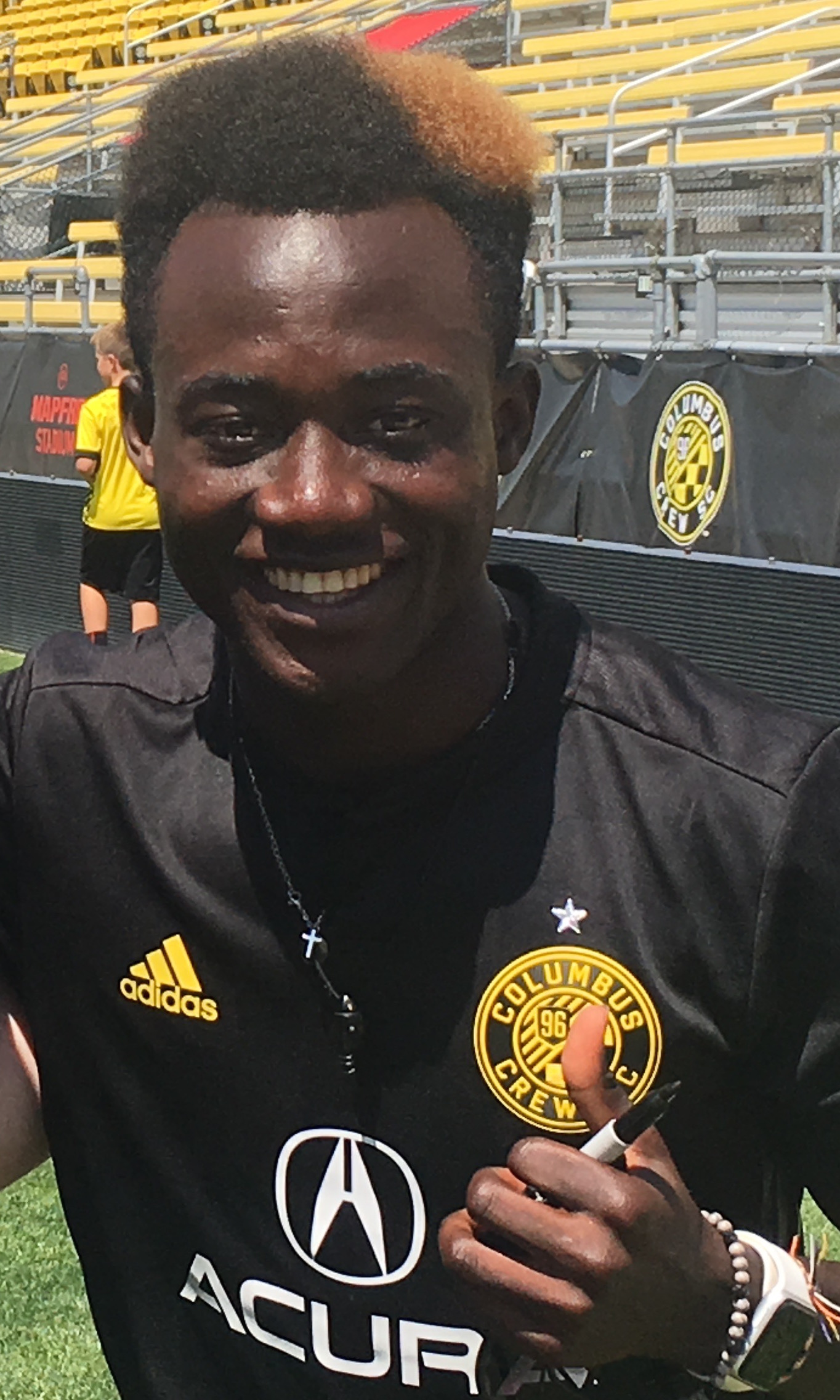
- Opoku with Columbus in 2018

Personal information
- Full name: Edward Opoku Yeboah Alexander
- Date of birth: 1 August 1997 (age 29)
- Place of birth: Konongo, Ghana
- Height: 1.70 m (5 ft 7 in)
- Position: Winger

Youth career
- 2006–2011: Right to Dream Academy

College career
Years	Team	Apps	(Gls)
2015–2017	Virginia Cavaliers	56	(16)

Senior career*
Years	Team	Apps	(Gls)
2016–2017	AC Connecticut	8	(6)
2018–2019	Columbus Crew SC	5	(0)
2018	→ Saint Louis FC (loan)	2	(0)
2019	→ Birmingham Legion (loan)	17	(1)
- * Club domestic league appearances and goals as of 21 October 2019

Edward Opoku Yeboah Alexander (born 1 August 1997) is a Ghanaian professional footballer who plays as a winger. He previously appeared at the senior level with AC Connecticut, Columbus Crew SC, Saint Louis FC, and Birmingham Legion.

Opoku came to the United States through the Right to Dream Academy at the age of 15, attending the Millbrook School and winning three state championships. He played collegiately for three seasons at Virginia, earning all-conference honors during each season, and spent time with AC Connecticut during the college offseason. Opoku signed a Generation Adidas contract with Major League Soccer ahead of the 2018 MLS SuperDraft and was selected by Columbus Crew SC in the second round. He made his professional debut while on loan to Saint Louis FC and later spent time on loan at Birmingham Legion during his two years with the Crew. Opoku is eligible to play for the national teams of Ghana and the United States and is a citizen of both countries.

== Early life ==
Born in Konongo, Ghana, Opoku began playing street football at the age of five, barefoot and using rocks as goalposts. When he was seven years old, he left home to play for a club in a nearby town that helped to support his family. At the age of 10, he took part in a tryout for the Right to Dream Academy, eventually becoming the only child from Konongo to earn a spot in the program. Opoku came to the United States through the academy at the age of 15, earning a scholarship to attend the Millbrook School. He helped the Mustangs win three NEPSAC Class C state titles, was a Western New England Prep School All-Select honoree in all four years of high school, and was named as the co-most valuable player of the 2014 High School All-America Game. Opoku set school records with 85 goals and 115 total points in his four years at Millbrook.

Opoku was ranked as the ninth-best player in the high school class of 2015 by College Soccer News. He committed to play college soccer at Virginia. He was ranked above the likes of Jack Harrison, and Kyle Duncan in the recruiting chart.

== College and amateur ==
"He’s one of the best character guys we have. His appreciation level for the smallest little things that most of us take for granted are incredible, which makes him hardworking, humble. I can’t begin to say enough about his character."

— Virginia head coach George Gelnovatch, speaking about Opoku in November 2015.

Opoku made his Virginia debut on 29 August 2015, coming off the bench in a victory over Charlotte. He went on to appear in all 18 matches, one of just three Cavaliers to do so, and started 15 times, primarily playing as a forward. His first collegiate goal came on 5 October, helping Virginia to a 3–2 victory against Portland. Opoku was named Third Team All-Atlantic Coast Conference (ACC) and to the ACC All-Freshman Team after finishing the season with two goals and three assists. He was one of just two freshmen to be named to an all-ACC team, the other being Jack Harrison. As a sophomore, Opoku netted six goals in 18 appearances for the Cavaliers. Five of those six goals were game-winners, a mark that ranked 13th nationally and second in the conference. His only goal that was not a game-winner came on 5 September 2016 against James Madison but was accompanied by an assist for the first multi-point game of his collegiate career. Opoku was named to the All-ACC Second Team at season's end.

As a junior, Opoku tallied multiple career-highs: eight goals and four assists in 20 appearances. He scored five times through the first six matches of the year, punctuating that stretch with two goals in a victory over Virginia Tech on 15 September 2017. Opoku added a golden goal in a victory over Portland on 2 October, the eighth game-winning goal of his career. He capped the season with his third consecutive all-conference honour, earning a spot on the All-ACC Second Team. Opoku departed Virginia following the year, ending his collegiate career with 16 goals in 56 appearances for the Cavaliers.

=== AC Connecticut ===
Following his freshman season at Virginia, Opoku joined AC Connecticut of the Premier Development League (PDL). He made his club debut three games into the campaign, entering as a substitute in a 2–2 draw against Westchester Flames on 28 May 2016. Opoku appeared in four matches during the year, tallying just a shot and a yellow card in his time on the pitch.

Opoku returned to AC Connecticut following his sophomore year of college, joining the club for the 2017 PDL season. He scored his first goal for the club on 21 May 2017, although Connecticut was defeated 2–1 by Seacoast United Phantoms. Opoku scored six in four total appearances on the year, and concluded his two seasons with the club having played eight times and scored six goals.

== Club career ==
=== Columbus Crew SC ===
==== 2018: Loan to Saint Louis ====
Ahead of the 2018 MLS Combine, Opoku signed a Generation Adidas contract with Major League Soccer (MLS), making him the seventh member of the Generation Adidas class. He was selected by Columbus Crew SC with the 32nd overall pick in the 2018 MLS SuperDraft, the first Generation Adidas player drafted by Columbus since Dilly Duka in 2010. In a bid to find playing time, Opoku was sent on loan to United Soccer League (USL) club Saint Louis FC on 27 April. He made his club and professional debut one day later, replacing Joey Calistri in the 78th minute of a 1–1 draw with Swope Park Rangers. Opoku made just one more appearance for Saint Louis before being recalled by Columbus on 18 May. He went on to make his Crew debut on 6 June, replacing Niko Hansen in the second half of a 2018 U.S. Open Cup match against Chicago Fire. He converted his kick in the penalty shootout as the Crew were eliminated on penalties. Opoku played his first MLS game on 21 July, beginning a stretch in which he appeared in four consecutive matches, and concluded the season with eight appearances in all competitions: six with Columbus and two with Saint Louis.

==== 2019: Loan to Birmingham ====
On 22 March 2019, Opoku was loaned to USL Championship expansion club Birmingham Legion for the duration of the 2019 USL Championship season. He made his debut for the Legion against Louisville City on 31 March, helping the club earn its first-ever victory. Opoku replaced Prosper Kasim in the 69th minute of an eventual 3–2 win for Birmingham. Later in the season, Opoku tallied his first professional goal, doing so in the second round of the 2019 U.S. Open Cup. Against West Chester United, he scored in the 89th minute, notched two assists, and drew a foul that led to a Legion penalty kick. He added a goal in league play against Tampa Bay Rowdies on 10 August, but then suffered a foot injury one week later in a fixture against Memphis 901. Opoku missed the rest of the season due to the injury, finishing his year with two goals from 18 appearances in all competitions. Following the end of the season in Columbus, Opoku had his contract option declined by the Crew, ending his time with the club after two seasons.

== Personal life ==
Opoku is the youngest of eight children to his mother, Regina Nkansah. His father was never involved in his life and refused to acknowledge Opoku as his son. Two of his siblings are deceased; one brother died at the age of 26 from a respiratory disease. Opoku grew up speaking Twi before learning English while at Right to Dream. When he turned professional in 2018, his mother had yet to see him play a match in person.

In 2018, Opoku started the clothing brand BeHappy, inspired by and named after his lifelong motto. The goal behind the brand was "to highlight the happy moments in average days, as people around the world do the same in their varied situations." Profits from the company were donated to the Fifi Soccer Foundation, a program founded by fellow Ghanaian and former Crew SC player Fifi Baiden. Through BeHappy, Opoku has hosted an annual football tournament for children in Konongo and has organized donation drives for shoes, clothes, and soccer equipment.

Opoku is friends with Mamadi Diakite, a native of Guinea who played basketball at Virginia. The two met while living in the same dormitory during their freshman year.

== Career statistics ==
As of 17 August 2019

Appearances and goals by club, season and competition
Club	Season	League			Cup (Note: All appearances in the U.S. Open Cup)		Continental		Other		Total	
Club	Season	Division	Apps	Goals	Apps	Goals	Apps	Goals	Apps	Goals	Apps	Goals
AC Connecticut	2016	PDL	4	0	–		–		–		4	0
AC Connecticut	2017	PDL	4	1	–		–		–		4	1
AC Connecticut	Total		8	1	0	0	0	0	0	0	8	1
Columbus Crew SC	2018	Major League Soccer	8	0	2	0	–		0	0	10	0
Columbus Crew SC	2019	Major League Soccer	0	0	0	0	–		–		0	0
Columbus Crew SC	Total		5	0	1	0	0	0	0	0	6	0
Saint Louis FC (loan)	2018	USL	2	0	0	0	–		0	0	2	0
Birmingham Legion (loan)	2019	USL Championship	17	2	1	1	–		0	0	19	2
Career total			32	2	2	1	0	0	0	0	34	3

== Honors ==
Individual

- Atlantic Coast Conference All-Freshman Team: 2015
- Third Team All-ACC: 2015
- NSCAA Second Team All-America: 2016
- NSCAA First Team All-South Region: 2016
- VaSID Award: 2016
- Second Team All-ACC: 2016, 2017
- United Soccer Coaches Second Team All-South Region: 2017

== See also ==
- All-time Columbus Crew roster
- List of foreign MLS players
- List of foreign USL Championship players
