= Jerome Williams =

Jerome Williams may refer to:

- Jerome Williams (basketball) (born 1973)
- Jerome Williams (baseball) (born 1981)
- Jerome Binnom-Williams (born 1995), footballer
- JJ Williams (soccer) (born 1998)

== See also ==
- Jerry Williams (disambiguation)
- Gerome Williams (born 1973), American football player
