= Sicard Hollow Athletic Complex =

Sports complex in Vestavia Hills, Alabama

- The SHAC
- Interactive map of Sicard Hollow Athletic Complex
- Location: 4700 Sicard Hollow Road; Vestavia Hills, AL 35242
- Coordinates: 33°28′34.4″N 86°40′18.1″W
- Owner: City of Vestavia Hills
- Capacity: 1,500

Construction
- Opened: 2011
- Cost: $5.5 million

Tenants
- Vestavia Hills Soccer Club (Youth) (2011–present); Birmingham Hammers (NPSL) (2015–2018)

The Sicard Hollow Athletic Complex is a multi-purpose sports complex in Vestavia Hills, Alabama, a suburb of Birmingham. The facility hosts the Vestavia Hills Soccer Club, a youth soccer program for the community, and used to host the Birmingham Hammers, a National Premier Soccer League club, until they were dissolved in 2018 to make way for Birmingham Legion FC, a USL Championship team. The main stadium seats 1,500 spectators.
