= Brian Wright (Canadian soccer) =

Canadian soccer player (born 1995)

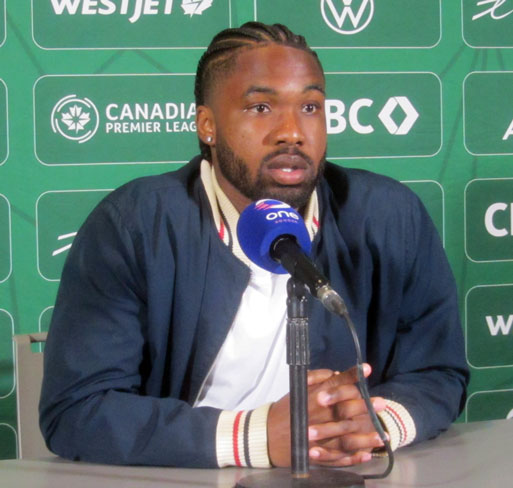
- Wright in 2024

Personal information
- Date of birth: March 23, 1995 (age 31)
- Place of birth: Toronto, Ontario, Canada
- Height: 1.84 m (6 ft 0 in)
- Position: Forward

Team information
- Current team: Forge FC
- Number: 9

Youth career
- Ajax SC

College career
Years	Team	Apps	(Gls)
2013–2016	Vermont Catamounts	80	(39)

Senior career*
Years	Team	Apps	(Gls)
2016	Burlingame Dragons	7	(2)
2017–2019	New England Revolution	14	(1)
2017	→ Tulsa Roughnecks (loan)	3	(0)
2019	→ Birmingham Legion (loan)	26	(6)
2020	Birmingham Legion	16	(3)
2021–2022	Atlético Ottawa	48	(13)
2023–2024	York United	49	(11)
2025–2026	Forge FC	45	(16)
- * Club domestic league appearances and goals as of October 25, 2026

Brian Wright (born March 23, 1995) is a Canadian professional soccer player who plays as a forward for Forge FC in the Canadian Premier League.

== Early life ==
Wright was born in Toronto and moved to Ajax with his family at age four. He played most of his youth soccer with local club Ajax SC.

== Club career ==
=== Early career ===
Wright spent his entire college career at the University of Vermont playing for its men's soccer team between 2013 and 2016. While at Vermont, Wright scored 39 goals and tallied 25 assists in 80 appearances while leading the Catamounts to back-to-back NCAA Tournament appearances in 2015 and 2016. He racked up numerous accolades including America East Conference Rookie of the Year in 2013, and was a three-time America East first team all-conference selection from his sophomore to senior years. Wright was also a multiple time NSCAA all-region selection, as well as a second team All-America selection in 2016 and was named a Hermann Trophy semifinalist. Wright finished his UVM career second all-time in points with 103, second all-time in goals, and third all-time in games played while also setting the single season record for points with 40.

While at Vermont, Wright appeared for USL PDL side Burlingame Dragons during their 2016 season.

=== New England Revolution ===
On January 13, 2017, Wright was selected in the first round (20th overall) of the 2017 MLS SuperDraft by New England Revolution. On March 30, 2017, Wright was sent on loan to United Soccer League side Tulsa Roughnecks. He made his professional debut on April 1, 2017 as a 60th-minute substitute during a 1-0 win against Rio Grande Valley FC Toros. Wright made his Revolution debut in the 2017 Lamar Hunt U.S. Open Cup fourth round with a start against the Rochester Rhinos in a 3-0 victory. In the following US Open Cup fifth round matchup against D.C. United, Wright scored his first professional goal helping the Revolution to a 2-1 win in the competition. On July 2, 2017, Wright made his MLS debut as a substitute in the 53rd minute in a 3-0 loss to the Philadelphia Union. Upon conclusion of the 2017 season, the Revolution would announce they would not exercise Wright's contract option for the 2018 season. However, he re-signed with the club on December 15, 2017.

On March 15, 2019, Wright was loaned to USL Championship side Birmingham Legion FC. The loan is open-ended and allows the Revolution to recall Wright at any time. Wright would have his option for the 2020 season declined by New England, ending his time with the club after three seasons.

=== Birmingham Legion ===
Following his release from New England, Wright signed a permanent multi-year deal with Birmingham Legion. He left Birmingham following the 2020 season.

=== Atlético Ottawa ===
On April 27, 2021, Wright signed with Canadian Premier League side Atlético Ottawa. In his first season with the club he was the second-highest scorer on the team, scoring six goals, but Ottawa finished the season in last place. Wright stayed with the club for the 2022 season, with higher expectations, and scored Ottawa's first goal of the year, a late penalty in the club's 1-0 home opener victory against Cavalry FC.

=== York United ===
In January 2023, York United announced they had signed Wright to a two-year deal. At the end of the 2024 season, he was named the 2024 CPL Players’ Player of the Year.

=== Forge FC ===
In January 2025, he signed with Forge FC.

== Honours ==
=== Atlético Ottawa ===
- Canadian Premier League
  - Regular Season: 2022

== Career statistics ==
As of match played November 3, 2025

Appearances and goals by club, season and competition
Club	Season	League			Playoffs		National Cup (Note: Includes US Open Cup and Canadian Championship)		Continental		Total	
Club	Season	Division	Apps	Goals	Apps	Goals	Apps	Goals	Apps	Goals		
New England Revolution	2017	Major League Soccer	2	0	—		3	1	—		5	1
New England Revolution	2018	Major League Soccer	10	1	—		1	0	—		11	1
New England Revolution	2019	Major League Soccer	2	0	0	0	0	0	—		2	0
New England Revolution	Total		14	1	0	0	4	1	0	0	18	2
Tulsa Roughnecks (loan)	2017	USL	3	0	0	0	0	0	—		3	0
Birmingham Legion (loan)	2019	USL Championship	26	6	2	0	0	0	—		28	6
Birmingham Legion	2020	USL Championship	16	3	0	0	—		—		16	3
Birmingham Legion	Total		42	9	2	0	0	0	0	0	44	9
Atlético Ottawa	2021	Canadian Premier League	23	6	—		1	1	—		24	7
Atlético Ottawa	2022	Canadian Premier League	25	7	3	0	1	0	—		29	7
Atlético Ottawa	Total		48	13	3	0	2	1	0	0	53	14
York United FC	2023	Canadian Premier League	26	2	1	0	2	0	—		29	2
York United FC	2024	Canadian Premier League	23	9	1	0	1	0	—		25	9
York United FC	Total		49	11	2	0	3	0	0	0	54	11
Forge FC	2025	Canadian Premier League	26	12	2	0	5	2	2	0	35	14
Career total			182	46	9	0	14	5	2	0	207	51
