= Jeremy Williams =

Jeremy Williams may refer to:

- Jeremy Huw Williams (born 1969), Welsh baritone opera singer
- Jeremy Francis Williams (born 1970), English guitarist and songwriter
- Jeremy Williams (boxer) (born 1972), American boxer and mixed martial artist
- Jeremy Williams (cricketer) (born 1979), English cricketer
- Jeremy Williams (ice hockey) (born 1984), Canadian ice hockey centre
- Jeremy Williams (Canadian football) (born 1991), American player of Canadian football
- Jeremy Williams (rugby union) (born 2000), Australian rugby union player
- Jeremy Tremaine Williams, American convicted murderer

== See also ==
- Jerry Williams (disambiguation)
