= Joe Nasco =

American soccer player (born 1984)

Personal information
- Full name: Joseph Nasco
- Date of birth: June 18, 1984 (age 42)
- Place of birth: Kissimmee, Florida, United States
- Height: 1.90 m (6 ft 3 in)
- Position: Goalkeeper

College career
Years	Team	Apps	(Gls)
2003–2004	Andrew Fighting Tigers		
2005–2007	Birmingham–Southern Panthers		

Senior career*
Years	Team	Apps	(Gls)
2008	Panama City Pirates	8	(0)
2012–2013	Atlanta Silverbacks	22	(0)
2014	Colorado Rapids	4	(0)
2014	→ Atlanta Silverbacks (loan)	4	(0)
2015	Fort Lauderdale Strikers	1	(0)
2019	Birmingham Legion	0	(0)

Managerial career
- 2016–2021: Birmingham–Southern Panthers (assistant)
- 2021–2022: Chattanooga Red Wolves (goalkeeping)
- 2023: UAB Blazers (goalkeeping)
- * Club domestic league appearances and goals as of March 10, 2019

Joseph Nasco (born June 18, 1984) is an American professional soccer player.

== Career ==
After spending time in Andrew College and Birmingham–Southern College, Nasco made eight appearances for Panama City Pirates in the USL Premier Development League. However, he left the game shortly after battling injury and took a job as a police officer for the Gordon County Sheriff's Department in Calhoun, Georgia.

In 2012, Nasco caught an eye of the Atlanta Silverbacks coaching staff at the team's first open combine and on March 21, Nasco signed a professional contract with the Silverbacks. On May 16, Nasco made his professional debut in a 3–0 loss to the Puerto Rico Islanders.

On February 12, 2014, Nasco signed with Major League Soccer club Colorado Rapids. On September 5, against the Los Angeles Galaxy, he set the MLS record for the fastest red card in a game with a foul against Alan Gordon a mere 34 seconds into the match.
