= Benjamin Kucera =

American association football player

Personal information
- Full name: Benjamin Joseph Kucera
- Date of birth: August 10, 1994 (age 32)
- Place of birth: Berwyn, Illinois, U.S.
- Height: 6 ft 3 in (1.91 m)
- Position: Defender

Youth career
- 2009–2012: Chicago Fire

College career
Years	Team	Apps	(Gls)
2012–2013	Creighton Bluejays	0	(0)
2014–2016	Santa Clara Broncos	38	(1)

Senior career*
Years	Team	Apps	(Gls)
2016–2017	Slovácko	0	(0)
2016–2017	Slovácko B	8	(0)
2018	Birmingham Hammers	12	(0)
2019	Birmingham Legion	4	(0)
- * Club domestic league appearances and goals as of October 21, 2019

Benjamin Joseph Kucera (born August 10, 1994) is an American former soccer player who played as a defender, most recently for USL Championship club Birmingham Legion.

== Career ==
=== College ===
Kucera began playing college soccer at Creighton University, but redshirted his first year and transferred to the University of Santa Clara in 2014.

=== Professional ===
In 2016, Kucera signed for Czech First League side Slovácko. However, he only appeared for the club's B team who competed in the Moravian–Silesian Football League.

Kucera returned to the United States in 2018, playing with USL PDL side Birmingham Hammers.

On February 27, 2019, Kucera signed for USL Championship side Birmingham Legion ahead of their inaugural season. He made his professional debut on August 17, 2019, appearing as an injury time substitute in a 1–0 win over Memphis 901.
