= Chandler Hoffman =

Retired American professional soccer player (born 1990)

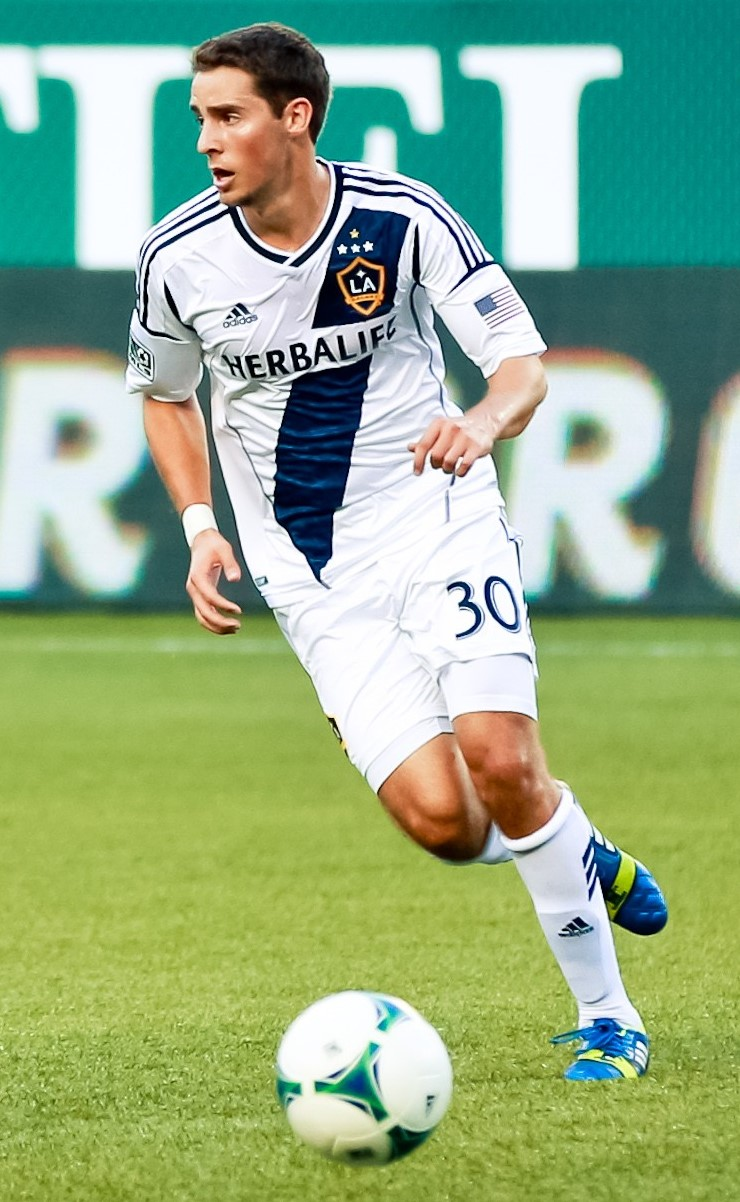
- Hoffman with the Galaxy in July 2013

Personal information
- Full name: Jon Chandler Hoffman
- Date of birth: August 17, 1990 (age 36)
- Place of birth: Birmingham, Alabama, U.S.
- Height: 6 ft 0 in (1.83 m)
- Position: Forward

College career
Years	Team	Apps	(Gls)
2009–2011	UCLA Bruins	54	(29)

Senior career*
Years	Team	Apps	(Gls)
2009	Panama City Pirates	7	(0)
2010–2011	Orange County Blue Star	25	(15)
2012	Philadelphia Union	7	(0)
2012	→ Harrisburg City Islanders (loan)	2	(0)
2013–2014	LA Galaxy	8	(0)
2014	→ LA Galaxy II (loan)	17	(13)
2015	Houston Dynamo	5	(0)
2015	→ Colorado Springs Switchbacks (loan)	10	(4)
2016	Louisville City	28	(14)
2017–2018	Real Monarchs	65	(28)
2019–2020	Birmingham Legion	17	(4)
2020	→ Orange County SC (loan)	9	(3)
2021–2022	Los Angeles Force	20	(3)
- * Club domestic league appearances and goals as of 1 May 2024

Jon Chandler Hoffman (born August 17, 1990) is an American former professional soccer player who plays as a forward.

== Career ==
=== College and amateur ===
After leading Oak Mountain High School to two state championships (2007, 2008), Hoffman played college soccer at UCLA between 2009 and 2011. During his time at UCLA, Hoffman was a Hermann Trophy semifinalist, NSCAA Third-team All-American, First-team NSCAA All-Far West selection, First-team All-Pac-12 honoree, Second-team CoSIDA Academic All-American, First-team Academic All-District and Pac-12 All-Academic.

Hoffman also played in the Premier Development League for Panama City Pirates in 2009 and Orange County Blue Star in both 2010 and 2011.

=== Professional ===
After his junior season at UCLA, Hoffman was offered a Generation Adidas contract by Major League Soccer which he accepted. He attended the MLS Player Combine, January 6–10, 2012 in Fort Lauderdale, Florida. He then headed to Kansas City, Missouri for the 2012 MLS SuperDraft where he was selected in the 1st Round (13th overall pick) by Philadelphia Union, becoming the first player from Alabama ever selected in the 1st Round of the MLS SuperDraft.

Hoffman made his professional debut on March 31, 2012, when he started for Philadelphia Union in a regular season home game at PPL Park against the Vancouver Whitecaps.

Hoffman was loaned to USL Pro club Harrisburg City Islanders for two matches on April 20–21, 2012.

Hoffman scored the game-winning goal in a friendly on May 9, 2012, vs. the popular European club, FC Schalke 04.

On the eve of the 2013 season, Hoffman was traded to Los Angeles Galaxy for a conditional 2014 MLS SuperDraft pick.

On December 18, 2014, Hoffman was selected by Houston Dynamo in stage two of the 2014 MLS Re-Entry Draft. He signed with the club eight days later.

After his release from Houston, Hoffman joined United Soccer League side Louisville City on December 28, 2015. In 2016, he led Louisville City in both goals and points.

Hoffman left Louisville at the end of the 2016 USL season.

On November 17, 2016, Hoffman signed with United Soccer League side Real Monarchs.

On July 3, 2020, Hoffman joined Orange County SC on loan for the 2020 season.

On February 19, 2021, Hoffman was signed by the Los Angeles Force of the National Independent Soccer Association.

Hoffman retired from play in 2025, and was appointed as commissioner of the NISA on July 23, 2025.

== Career statistics ==
=== Club ===
As of October 9, 2020

Club	Season	League			Playoffs (Note: All appearances in the USL Cup Playoffs)		Cup		Continental		Total	
Club	Season	Division	Apps	Goals	Apps	Goals	Apps	Goals	Apps	Goals	Apps	Goals
Panama City Pirates	2009	PDL	7	0	–		–		–		7	0
Orange County Blue Star	2010	PDL	12	2	–		–		–		12	2
Orange County Blue Star	2011	PDL	13	13	–		–		–		13	13
Orange County Blue Star	Total		25	15	0	0	0	0	0	0	25	15
Philadelphia Union	2012	MLS	7	0	–		2	0	–		9	0
Harrisburg City Islanders (loan)	2012	USL Pro	2	0	0	0	0	0	–		2	0
LA Galaxy	2013	MLS	0	0	0	0	1	0	3	1	4	1
LA Galaxy	2014	MLS	8	0	0	0	1	0	0	0	9	0
LA Galaxy	Total		8	0	0	0	2	0	3	1	13	1
LA Galaxy II (loan)	2014	USL Pro	17	13	2	1	0	0	–		19	14
Houston Dynamo	2015	MLS	5	0	–		2	0	–		7	0
Colorado Springs Switchbacks (loan)	2015	USL	10	4	2	0	0	0	–		12	4
Louisville City	2016	USL	28	14	3	1	2	1	–		33	16
Real Monarchs	2017	USL	32	16	1	1	–		–		33	17
Real Monarchs	2018	USL	33	12	1	0	–		–		34	12
Real Monarchs	Total		65	28	2	1	0	0	0	0	67	29
Birmingham Legion	2019	USL Championship	17	4	0	0	2	1	–		19	5
Orange County (loan)	2020	USL Championship	9	3	0	0	0	0	–		9	3
Career total			200	81	9	3	10	2	3	1	222	87

== Honors ==
- MLS Cup: 2014
- 2017 USL Regular Season Champions: 2017

=== Individual ===
- Pac-12 Conference:
  - First-team: 2010, 2011
- NSCAA Far West Region:
  - First-team: 2011
- NCAA All-American:
  - Third-team: 2011
- Soccer America All-American:
  - First-team: 2011
- College Soccer News All-American:
  - Second-team: 2011
- USL Premier Development League:
  - All League First Team: 2011
  - All Western Conference Team: 2011
- USL Pro:
  - All League First Team: 2014, 2017
