= Gerard Williams =

Gerard Williams may refer to:

- Gerard Williams (American football) (1952–2026), American football cornerback
- Gerard Williams (footballer) (born 1988), Saint Kitts and Nevis footballer
- Gerard Williams (baseball), Negro leagues baseball player

== See also ==
- Gerry Williams (disambiguation)
- Gerald Williams (disambiguation)
