= Alabama Christian Academy =

Location
- 4700 Wares Ferry Road; Montgomery, Alabama 36109; United States
- 32°23′18″N 86°13′6″W

Information
- Type: Private
- Established: 1942 (84 years ago)
- CEEB code: 011869
- Head of school: Greg Glenn
- Teaching staff: 63.6 (on a FTE basis)
- Grades: K-12
- Enrollment: 935 (plus 22 preschoolers) (2013-14)
- Student to teacher ratio: 14.7
- Campus size: 25 acres (10 ha)
- Campus type: Urban
- Colors: Maroon and white
- Nickname: Eagles
- Affiliation: Church of Christ
- Website: www.alabamachristian.org

Alabama Christian Academy (ACA) is a private Protestant school in Montgomery, Alabama. ACA is a coeducational, college preparatory school and is affiliated with the Churches of Christ. As of the 2013–2014 school year, Alabama Christian Academy had 957 students enrolled in Pre-K through the 12th grade. It is accredited by the Southern Association of Colleges and Schools. Alabama Christian is also a member of the National Christian Schools Association (NCSA) and the Alabama High School Athletic Association (AHSAA).

== History ==
Alabama Christian Academy was founded in 1942. The founders of the school wanted to provide families of central Alabama a place where students could receive a Bible-based education. Alabama Christian relocated to its current site on Wares Ferry Road in 1985. Along with the move, the school began an extensive building plan which increased the number of elementary and high school classrooms and renovated the football stadium.

== Demographics ==
The demographic breakdown of the 935 K-12 students enrolled in 2013-14 was:

- Native American/Alaskan - 0%
- Asian/Pacific islanders - 5.0%
- Black - 10.2%
- Hispanic - 0%
- White - 84.8%
- Multiracial - 0%

== Athletics ==
Alabama Christian Academy has middle school and high school teams for baseball, basketball, cheerleading, cross country, football, golf, soccer, softball, track and field, and volleyball. The baseball team won the state championship in 1995 and 2000. The softball team has won the state championship ten times, in 1995, 1998, 1999, 2002, 2003, 2004, 2006, 2007, 2009, and 2019. Also, the school's volleyball team won the state championship in 2002 and 2003.

== Notable alumni ==
- Sylvia Swayne, the first openly transgender person to run for public office in Alabama.
