= Mathieu Laurent =

Canadian soccer player (born 1996)

Personal information
- Full name: Mathieu Simon Laurent
- Date of birth: February 28, 1996 (age 30)
- Place of birth: Markham, Ontario, Canada
- Height: 1.88 m (6 ft 2 in)
- Position: Defender

Team information
- Current team: Vaughan Azzurri

Youth career
- Unionville Milliken SC
- Markham SC
- Mississauga SC

College career
Years	Team	Apps	(Gls)
2014–2018	UAB Blazers	66	(2)

Senior career*
Years	Team	Apps	(Gls)
2014–2015	Vaughan Azzurri		
2016–2017	K–W United	17	(1)
2018	Birmingham Hammers	12	(3)
2019–2020	Birmingham Legion	25	(2)
2024–	Vaughan Azzurri	20	(4)

International career
2013	Canada U17	1	(0)
- * Club domestic league appearances and goals as of August 29, 2025

Mathieu Simon Laurent (born February 28, 1996) is a Canadian soccer player who plays as a defender for Vaughan Azzurri in League1 Ontario.

== Early life ==
He began playing youth soccer at age five with Unionville Milliken SC. HE later played youth soccer with Markham SC and Mississauga SC. He played with Team Ontario at the 2013 Canada Summer Games, winning a bronze medal and being named to the tournament all-star team.

== College career ==
In 2014, he began attending the University of Alabama at Birmingham, where he played for the men's soccer team. After his freshman season, he was named to the All-Conference USA Freshman Team, He redshirted his sophomore season due to injury. In 2016, he was named team captain and was named to an NSCAA Division I Scholar All-South Region Team. He scored his first collegiate goal on October 3, 2017 against the Georgia State Panthers. On October 21, 2017, he scored the game-winning goal against the Florida Atlantic Owls. After the season, he was named a Conference USA Second Team All-Star. In 2018, he was named to the Preseason All-Conference USA Team, a Scholar First Team Scholar All-South Region selection, Third Team Scholar All-American, and was once again named a Conference USA Second Team All-Star.

== Club career ==
In 2014 and 2015, he played with Vaughan Azzurri in League1 Ontario.

In 2016 and 2017, he played with K-W United in the Premier Development League, scoring one goal over the course of two seasons.

In 2018, he played with the Birmingham Hammers in the PDL.

In January 2019, he attended an open combine with USL Championship side Birmingham Legion ahead of their inaugural season, after which he signed a professional contract with the club. In September 2019, he tore his ACL and would miss the remainder of the season. Following the 2019 season, he was named the team Newcomer of the Year and signed an extension with the club for the 2020 season. In August 2020, it was announced that Laurent had torn his ACL again and would miss the remainder of the season.

In 2024, he played with Vaughan Azzurri in League1 Ontario and was named a league First Team All-Star.

== International career ==
He made his debut in the Canadian program, attending a camp with the Canada U17 team in November 2012. He won a bronze medal at the 2013 CONCACAF U-17 Championship, featuring in one match, while also being named to the roster for the 2013 FIFA U-17 World Cup.
