= Gerry Williams (artist) =

American ceramics artist and magazine publisher

- Born: Frederick Gerald Williams; 1926; Asanol, Bengal, India
- Died: August 25, 2014 (aged 87–88); New Hampshire, United States
- Education: Woodstock School, Cornell College
- Spouse: Julie Williams

Gerry Williams (1926 – 2014) was an American potter. He was also a co-founder of Studio Potter magazine.

== Biography ==
He was born Frederick Gerald Williams in Asansol, Bengal, India, in 1926, during the era of the British Raj. His parents were American missionaries in Bengal, having founded a school for Indian school children.

He attended Woodstock School in Mussoorie in Uttarakhand from 1937 until 1942. He returned to the United States and he attended Cornell College in Iowa. He was a conscientious objector during World War II and missed several years of college due to the war. In the 1940s, Williams discovered pottery while living in Maine.

In 1949, Williams moved to Concord, New Hampshire, and started his own pottery business. In the early 1950s he took ceramic classes at the League of New Hampshire Craftsmen. In 1953 he built his own studio and home in Dunbarton, New Hampshire, where he remained for many years with his wife Julie. In 1972, Williams founded Studio Potter magazine with Julie.

Gerry Williams died on August 25, 2014, in New Hampshire from Parkinson's disease. His work is included in various public museum collections, including at the Museum of Fine Arts, Boston, the Currier Museum of Art, the Museum of Contemporary Crafts, the Fleming Museum of Art, and others. He is featured in the award-winning documentary short An American Potter (1976), produced and directed by Charles Musser.
