= Jeremy Williams (cricketer) =

English cricketer

Jeremy Williams (born 19 January 1979) is a former English cricketer. He was a right-handed batsman and wicket-keeper who played for Devon. He was born in Plymouth.

Williams, who played in the Minor Counties Championship for the team between 1998 and 2003, made two List A appearances in 2001 and 2002. Williams made a top score of 40 runs on his List A debut against Bedfordshire.

Williams made appearances for Plympton in the Devon Cricket League between 2002 and 2023.
