= Marcel Appiah =

German footballer (born 1988)

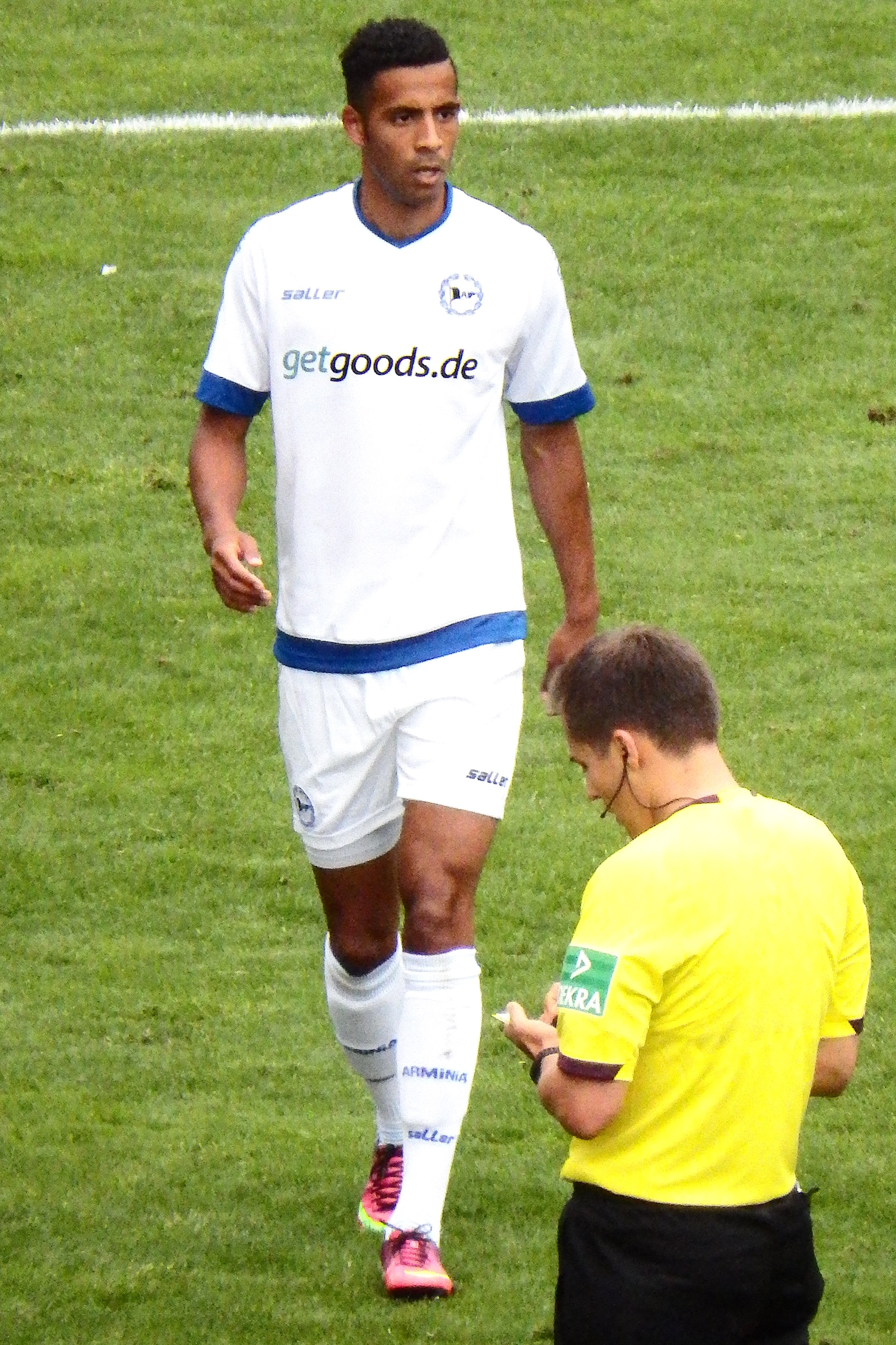
- Appiah in 2013

Personal information
- Date of birth: 26 March 1988 (age 38)
- Place of birth: Schwelm, West Germany
- Height: 1.89 m (6 ft 2 in)
- Positions: Centre-back; right back

Youth career
- 1994–1999: TuS Ennepetal
- 1999–2004: Schalke 04
- 2004: TSG Sprockhövel
- 2005: VfL Bochum
- 2005–2007: Wattenscheid 09

Senior career*
Years	Team	Apps	(Gls)
2007–2008	TSG Sprockhövel	19	(1)
2008–2011	Arminia Bielefeld II	64	(1)
2010–2014	Arminia Bielefeld	106	(5)
2014–2016	NEC	50	(0)
2016–2018	VfL Osnabrück	61	(0)
2019	Birmingham Legion	3	(0)
2019–2021	VfR Aalen	44	(0)
2021–2024	VfB Oldenburg	77	(1)
- * Club domestic league appearances and goals as of 15:30, 4 July 2024 (UTC)

Marcel Appiah (born 26 March 1988) is a German professional footballer who most recently played as a centre-back or right-back for VfB Oldenburg. He previously played for Eredivisie club NEC, Arminia Bielefeld, VfL Osnabrück, Birmingham Legion, and VfR Aalen.

== Early life ==
Appiah was born to a Ghanaian father and an Italian mother in Schwelm and grew up in Ennepetal.

== Career ==
Appiah played in the youth for TuS Ennepetal, FC Schalke 04, TSG Sprockhövel, VfL Bochum and SG Wattenscheid. He made his professional debut in the 2. Bundesliga on 24 April 2010 against 1. FC Kaiserslautern.

== Personal life ==
His uncle is the former Italian footballer and current German SPD politician Giuseppe Bianco.

== Honours ==
NEC

- Eerste Divisie: 2014–15
