= Lee Styslinger III =

American businessman

Lee Styslinger
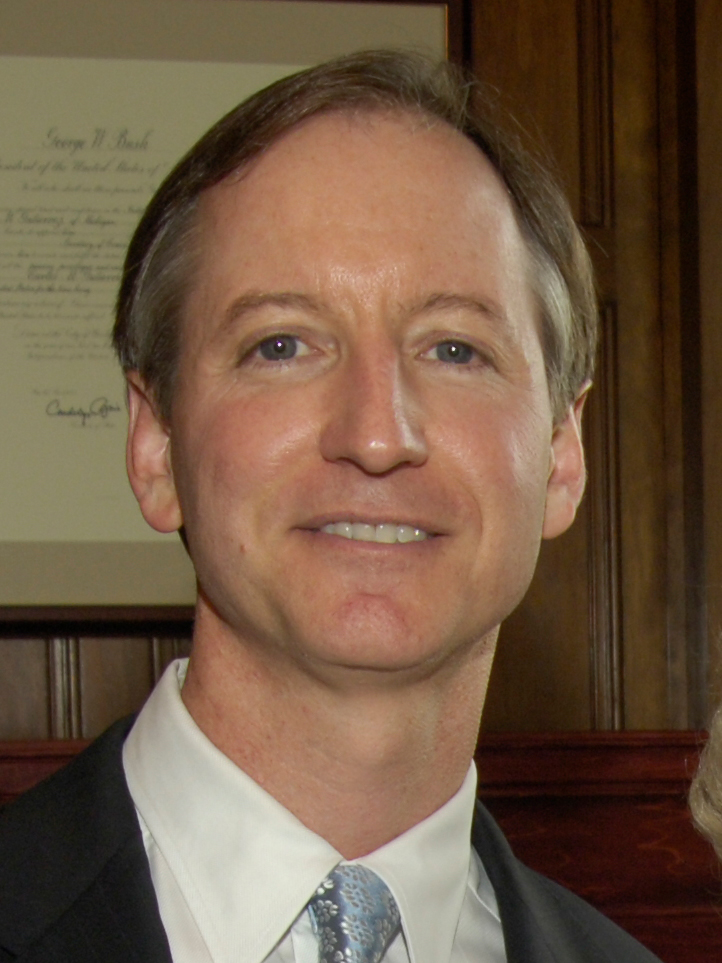
- Styslinger in 2006
- Born: Lee Joseph Styslinger III c. 1961 (age 64–65); Birmingham, Alabama, United States
- Education: Northwestern University (BA), Harvard University (MBA)
- Occupation: Businessman
- Known for: Co-Owner of Altec

Lee J. Styslinger III is an American businessman, philanthropist, and policy advisor. He is co-owner of Altec, Inc., and has previously served as its chairman, chief executive officer, and/or President since 1994. Altec designs, produces, and markets "for the electric and telecommunications industries" in around 100 countries. Styslinger serves on various boards and committees.

== Early life and education ==
Styslinger was born in Birmingham, Alabama. He earned an undergraduate degree from Northwestern University in 1983 and an MBA from Harvard University in 1988.

== Business career ==
In 1983, Styslinger started his career at Altec, Inc.—a company his grandfather founded in 1929. He became president in 1994 and was named CEO in 1997, and now serves as co-owner of Altec, Inc., the Holding Company for Altec Industries, Capital Services, National Equipment Company, Altec Worldwide, Global Rental, and Altec Ventures. In 2012, Styslinger was named one of the most influential people in Birmingham by the Birmingham Business Journal.

He is on the board of directors of Workday, Regions Financial Corporation (RF), and Vulcan Materials Company (VM). He is a member of The Business Roundtable and The Business Council. He serves on the dean’s board of advisers for Harvard Business School and on the board of advisors for Northwestern University. Styslinger is also a trustee and board member for the Children’s Hospital of Alabama and for the Brookings Institution.

== Public policy ==
From 2006 to 2008, Styslinger served as an appointee on the President’s Export Council, where he advised then-President George W. Bush on trade policy. He became a member of President Donald Trump’s Manufacturing Council in February 2017, focused on Workforce Policy, Deregulation, and Infrastructure. He is also on the Council on Foreign Relations, where he is part of the independent task force behind a report on workforce changes, and on the Advisory Committee for Trade and Negotiations of the Office of the United States Trade Representative.

In April 2020, Styslinger was selected to be part of the Great American Economic Revival Advisory Council assembled by President Trump. This council was established to lead the reopening of the US economy in the wake of the COVID-19 pandemic.

== Sports ==
In 2006, Styslinger became one of thirty trustees for the United States Ski and Snowboard Association, and, in September 2014, he joined the board of the International Tennis Hall of Fame. A member of the Augusta National Golf Club in Georgia, he is also a part of the Masters Tournament committee and involved with events such as the Latin America Amateur Championship. In early February 2014, he was paired with Steven Bowditch at the AT&T Pebble Beach National Pro-Am. He is part of the ownership team behind the newly formed professional soccer team Birmingham Legion FC (United Soccer League) for Birmingham, Alabama. The team became active in 2019.

== Philanthropy ==
Styslinger serves on the board for the Altec/Styslinger Foundation. The Foundation is focused on supporting education and health care initiatives and has gifted funds to the University of Alabama at Birmingham for the development of a renovated Genomic Medicine and Data Sciences Building. He also serves as the Fundraising Co-Chair for Birmingham Promise, a program established to create academic and economic opportunities for graduating students in the community, and on the board of the Hoover Institution. In 2021, Styslinger was named the recipient of the Outstanding Philanthropist Award by the Alabama Chapter of the Association of Fundraising Professionals.

In 2025, the University of Alabama renamed its College of Engineering in honor of Styslinger's father, Lee J. Styslinger Jr., following a gift commitment from the Styslinger family.

== Personal life ==
As of 2017, Styslinger lives in Birmingham, Alabama.
