= Femi Hollinger-Janzen =

Beninese former footballer (born 1993)

Personal information
- Full name: Oluwafemi Hollinger-Janzen
- Date of birth: 14 December 1993 (age 32)
- Place of birth: Cotonou, Benin
- Height: 1.83 m (6 ft 0 in)
- Position: Forward

College career
Years	Team	Apps	(Gls)
2012–2015	Indiana Hoosiers	88	(22)

Senior career*
Years	Team	Apps	(Gls)
2016–2018	New England Revolution	32	(2)
2018	→ Tulsa Roughnecks (loan)	1	(0)
2019	Birmingham Legion	21	(1)
- * Club domestic league appearances and goals as of 21 October 2019

Oluwafemi Hollinger-Janzen (born 14 December 1993) is a Beninese former footballer.

== Early life ==
Hollinger-Janzen was born on 14 December 1993 in Cotonou, Benin. A mission worker named Lynda Hollinger-Janzen was working in a church-based health care center in Benin, in the maternity department. Women would arrive well into labor, pay $3 to have their babies’ umbilical cords cut with sterile instruments, then leave a few hours later. A maternity doctor burst in the room with an abandoned child... one with a deformed leg. That child was Femi. After a few attempts of connecting the birth mother to him, it failed. When Femi was 6, the birth father signed off on him being adopted, and the birth mother was considered legally incapable of caring for her child. A family court judge then granted Femi's adoption into the Hollinger-Janzen family. He was officially adopted in 1999.

== Career ==
=== High school ===
Femi Hollinger-Janzen attended high school at Bethany Christian Schools in Goshen, Indiana. Femi was named Northern Indiana Soccer Conference Player of the Year, Gatorade All-American, Gatorade Indiana Player of the Year and Indiana Soccer Coaches Association Player of the Year in 2011. Femi had a total of 67 goals and 23 assists during his high school career.

=== College ===
Hollinger-Janzen spent his entire college career at Indiana University. In his four years with the Hoosiers, he made a total of 88 appearances and tallied 22 goals and eight assists and was part of the team that won the 2012 College Cup.

=== Professional ===
On 19 January 2016, Hollinger-Janzen was selected in the third round (51st overall) of the 2016 MLS SuperDraft by the New England Revolution. He signed a professional contract with the club on March 16 and made his professional debut four days later in a 3–0 defeat to the Philadelphia Union. Hollinger-Janzen scored his first professional goal in a 2–0 win over Chicago Fire on 14 May 2016.

In the 2016 MLS Expansion Draft, Femi was selected by Minnesota United FC with the 10th pick.

In 2017, the New England Revolution and Minnesota United FC completed a trade deal which included a player swap. Minnesota received New England Revolution goalkeeper Bobby Shuttleworth, and Revs received Hollinger-Janzen.

New England declined Hollinger-Janzen's contract at the end of their 2018 season.

On 7 January 2019, Hollinger-Janzen joined USL Championship club Birmingham Legion ahead of their inaugural season. Following his release at the end of the 2019 season, Hollinger-Janzen announced his retirement.
