= MLS Combine =

MLS Player Combine
- Region: United States and Canada
- Teams: 4
- Website: http://www.mlssoccer.com

The Major League Soccer Player Combine was a four-day annual showcase, that occurred every January until its discontinuation in 2020.

== Format ==
The present Player Combine features four teams composed of invitees, usually who play on youth national teams or were standout players on premier college soccer teams.

== 2018 Combine Teams ==
- Team Tango (blue)
- Team Predator (red)
- Team X (white)
- Team Nemeziz (black)

== Caribbean expansion ==
In November 2013, the Caribbean Football Union and Major League Soccer came to an agreement where all 31 CFU members could put forward player candidates between the age of 18 and 22 to be entered into the combine. The Caribbean candidates would be vetted at a Caribbean combine event taking place in Antigua in January 2014.

== See also ==
- MLS SuperDraft
- MLS Supplemental Draft
- College soccer
