= Razak Cromwell =

Ghanaian footballer (born 1994)

Abdul Razak Cromwell
Personal information
- Full name: Abdul Razak Cromwell
- Date of birth: 3 October 1994 (age 32)
- Place of birth: Ghana
- Position: Defender

Senior career*
Years	Team	Apps	(Gls)
2016–2017	Proud United		
2017–2020	Dreams F.C.	7	(0)
2019–2020	→ Birmingham Legion FC (loan)	28	(0)
2023–2024	Central Valley Fuego FC	33	(0)
- * Club domestic league appearances and goals as of 22 November 2024

Abdul Razak Cromwell (born 3 October 1994) is a Ghanaian professional footballer who plays as a defender.

== Career ==
=== Dreams FC ===
Cromwell joined Dreams F.C. from Ghanaian Division One Zone II side Proud United FC in November 2017 and signed a contract until 2021. Cromwell made his debut in the Ghana Premier League on 20 March 2018 against Elmina Sharks F.C. Cromwell is left footed and had played seven times for Dreams in the Ghana Premier League as a left-back before agreeing to the move to Alabama.

=== Birmingham Legion ===
He was personally scouted in Ghana by Jay Heaps and Tom Soehn for Legion after impressing in a pre-season competition. The loan move has an option to make the deal permanent.

=== Central Valley Fuego FC ===
On 7 January 2023, Cromwell joined USL League One side Central Valley Fuego FC ahead of the 2023 season.

== Coaching career ==
Cromwell signed with Athletes Untapped as a private soccer coach on February 12, 2025.
