= PNC Field (Birmingham, Alabama) =

Soccer stadium in Birmingham, Alabama, US

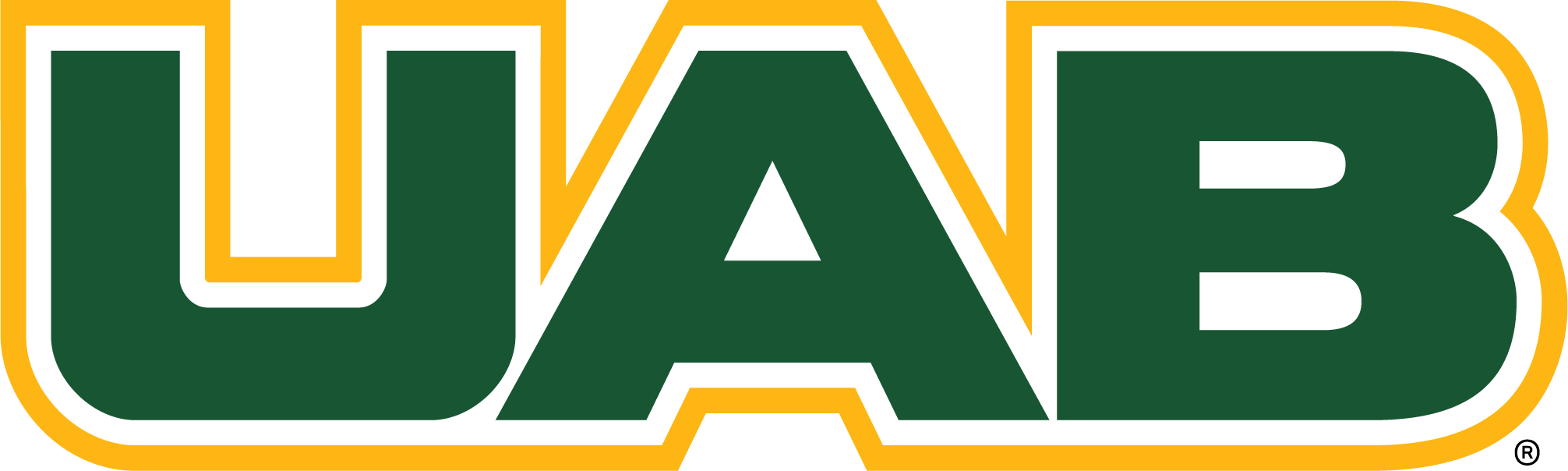
- Interactive map of PNC Field
- Former names: BBVA Field
- Address: 800 11th Street South; Birmingham, Alabama; United States
- Coordinates: 33°29′53″N 86°48′45″W
- Owner: University of Alabama at Birmingham
- Operator: UAB Athletics Dept.
- Capacity: 5,000
- Surface: Grass
- Current use: College soccer

Construction
- Opened: October 2015; 10 years ago
- Expanded: 2018–2019

Tenants
- UAB Blazers (NCAA) teams: men's and women's soccer (2015–present); Professional teams: Birmingham Legion (USLC) (2019–21)

Website
- uabsports.com/pnc-field

PNC Field (formerly BBVA Field) is a soccer-specific stadium located in Birmingham, Alabama, United States, on the campus of the University of Alabama at Birmingham (UAB) that has served as the home field for both the UAB Blazers men's and women's soccer teams since its opening in October 2015 as the replacement for West Campus Field. Development of the stadium was facilitated after BBVA USA made a $1.5 million donation to the university for its construction in November 2014.

In February 2018, the Board of Trustees approved a $7.3 million expansion of the facility from 2,500 to 5,000 seats. The expansion was financed in part by the Birmingham Legion FC, which agreed to an eight-year lease to play at the stadium starting in 2019 for $350,000 annually.

Originally named for corporate sponsor BBVA USA, the name was changed in late 2021 to reflect the purchase of BBVA United States banking operations by PNC.

In November 2021, Legion FC terminated its lease early with the University of Alabama Board of Trustees, effective when the team's run in the USL Championship playoffs ended. Legion FC had experienced problems with pitch conditions during the 2021 season, causing a match against Memphis 901 to be moved to Legion Field on short notice.
