= Marcos Ugarte =

American soccer player (born 1992)

Personal information
- Date of birth: December 2, 1992 (age 33)
- Place of birth: Madrid, Spain
- Height: 5 ft 8 in (1.73 m)
- Position: Midfielder

College career
Years	Team	Apps	(Gls)
2011–2012	Providence Friars	35	(8)
2013–2014	Michigan Wolverines	30	(3)

Senior career*
Years	Team	Apps	(Gls)
2013–2014	Michigan Bucks	9	(0)
2015–2016	Rochester Rhinos	34	(0)
2018	Ringkøbing	12	(0)
2019–2021	Birmingham Legion	14	(0)

International career
- United States U17
- United States U18

Managerial career
- 2017: Michigan Wolverines (volunteer asst.)
- 2022-2023: Michigan Wolverines (assistant)
- 2024-: Rhode Island FC (assistant)
- * Club domestic league appearances and goals as of November 5, 2021

Marcos Ugarte (born December 2, 1992) is an American former soccer player who played as a midfielder, and currently serves as an assistant coach for USL Championship club Rhode Island FC.

== Career ==
=== Youth and college ===
Ugarte played high school soccer at the Providence Country Day School and then went off to college soccer at Providence College and the University of Michigan between 2011 and 2014.

Ugarte also appeared for Premier Development League club Michigan Bucks between 2013 and 2014.

=== Professional ===
Ugarte signed with United Soccer League club Rochester Rhinos on March 26, 2015.

Ugarte missed 2017 due to injury, before joining Danish side Ringkøbing IF in 2018. On December 19, 2018, Ugarte joined Birmingham Legion FC after attending an open tryout for the club.
