= Prosper Kasim =

Ghanaian footballer (born 1996)

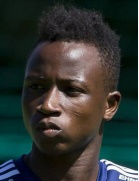

Personal information
- Date of birth: 15 December 1996 (age 29)
- Place of birth: Accra, Ghana
- Height: 1.76 m (5 ft 9 in)
- Positions: Winger; forward

Youth career
- –2013: International Allies

Senior career*
Years	Team	Apps	(Gls)
2013–2015	International Allies	16+	(6+)
2015–2018	IFK Göteborg	1	(0)
2017	→ Norrby IF (loan)	21	(3)
2018	→ Mjällby AIF (loan)	27	(10)
2019–2024	Birmingham Legion	160	(26)
2025–2026	Union Omaha	22	(4)

International career^{‡}
2015	Ghana U20	7	(0)
- * Club domestic league appearances and goals as of 31 October 2025 ‡ National team caps and goals as of 5 June 2015

Prosper Kasim (born 15 December 1996), often written as Kasim Prosper, is a Ghanaian professional footballer who plays as a forward.

== Career statistics ==
As of 5 October 2019

Club	Season	League			Cup (Note: Includes the Svenska Cupen and U.S. Open Cup)		Continental		Other		Total	
Club	Season	Division	Apps	Goals	Apps	Goals	Apps	Goals	Apps	Goals	Apps	Goals
IFK Göteborg	2015	Allsvenskan	0	0	1	0	0	0	1 (Note: Appearance in the Svenska Supercupen)	0	2	0
IFK Göteborg	2016	Allsvenskan	1	0	1	0	0	0	–		2	0
IFK Göteborg	2017	Allsvenskan	0	0	0	0	–		–		0	0
IFK Göteborg	2018	Allsvenskan	0	0	0	0	–		–		0	0
IFK Göteborg	Total		1	0	2	0	0	0	1	0	4	0
Norrby IF (loan)	2017	Superettan	21	3	0	0	–		–		21	3
Mjällby AIF (loan)	2018	Division 1	27	10	0	0	–		–		27	10
Birmingham Legion	2019	USL Championship	30	6	2	1	–		0	0	32	7
Career total			79	19	4	1	0	0	1	0	84	20
