= Panama City Beach Pirates =

- Full name: Panama City Beach Pirates
- Nickname: The Pirates
- Founded: 2007 (as Panama City Pirates)
- Dissolved: 2015
- Ground: Mike Gavlak Stadium; Panama City Beach, Florida
- Capacity: 3,500
- Owner: Eehab Kenawy
- Head Coach: Greg Devito
- League: Premier Developmental League
- 2014: 4th, Southeast; Playoffs: DNQ
Home colors	Away colors

The Panama City Beach Pirates were an American soccer team that played in the Southeast Division of the USL Premier Development League (PDL), the fourth tier of the American soccer pyramid. The club was founded in 2007 as the Panama City Pirates and played in the PDL in 2008 and 2009, before folding due to financial constraints. However, the club was revived in 2011 under new ownership to begin play again in the PDL in 2012. After the 2014 season the Pirates again ended their program.

The team played its home games in Panama City Beach, Florida at Mike Gavlak Stadium on the campus of Arnold High School, where it had played since 2008. The team's colors were black, white and red.

== History ==
=== Early days ===
The Panama City Pirates were founded in 2007 to begin play in the USL Premier Development League, the fourth tier of the American soccer pyramid. The team received a great deal of local fanfare and publicity, but found the early going tough in competitive terms, losing their opening two games, both to Central Florida Kraze on consecutive dates. Despite a couple of battling ties, the Pirates didn't pick up their first victory until the first weekend of June, with a 3–2 win at home over Nashville Metros. The Palm Beach Pumas were defeated 6–0, 7–0 and 5–0 in their three games in June. C.D. Harris and Bruno Conceição scored 12 of the Pirates' 18 goals against the Pumas between them, and helped the team enjoy a seven-game unbeaten streak which included a 1–0 win over Bradenton Academics, and an unexpected 3–0 victory over the Central Florida Kraze. In the latter game they playing with 10 men for over half an hour. Their late-season charge wasn't enough for them to make the playoffs, and their last-day defeat to Bradenton left them in 5th place in the Southeast in their first year. C.D. Harris and Bruno Conceição were the season's top scorers, with 10 and 7 goals respectively.

The team folded in April 2010, just weeks before the start of the 2010 PDL season, when owners Laird and Nanette Hitchcock informed the league there were no financial resources with which to continue running the club.

Original Panama City Pirates logo 2008–2010

=== 2012 season ===
In November 2011, the club was resurrected as the Panama City Beach Pirates under the new ownership of Eehab Kenawy, Jill Holt, and Amy Dalton to once again play in the USL PDL in 2012.

The Pirates played in the Southeast Division of the Southern Conference of the PDL, along with the Ocala Stampede, Orlando City U-23, IMG Bradenton Academics, VSI Tampa Bay, Mississippi Brilla, Fort Lauderdale Schulz Academy, and FC Jax Destroyers.

The Pirates finished the season in 6th place, with 16 points in the regular season and a 4–3–1 home record, and 6–7–3 overall.

=== 2013 season ===
The Pirates held open tryouts for the 2013 PDL season on January 12–13 and February 9–10 at Pete Edwards Field in Panama City Beach, with the season set to begin on May 2, 2013.

The Pirates clinched a playoff spot after defeating Ft. Lauderdale Schulz Academy 2–0 at home on July 13, 2013; Tyler Fabian scoring both goals. This marked the first time the Pirates made it to the post-season.

The season came to an end in Austin, Texas, in a loss to the home-town Aztex 0–4 in the Southern Conference semi-finals to end the season with a 10–4–1 record.

=== Colors and badge ===
The Pirates use black Adidas Tiro 11 jerseys at home and red as visitors, with official USL numbers. The Front sponsor for the 2012 & 2013 jersey is the Panama City Beach Visitor Bureau.

== Stadium ==
- Mike Gavlak Stadium; Panama City Beach, Florida (2008–2009, 2012–2015)
- Pete Edwards Field; Panama City Beach, Florida (2012–2015, Practice Facility)

=== Average attendance ===
- 2008: 270
- 2009: 357
- 2012: 450
- 2013: 457

== Club culture ==
=== Mascot ===
Captain Jack the pirate was the official mascot of the Panama City Beach Pirates after the team was reestablished during the 2012 season.

== Head coaches ==
- (United States) Bill Elliott (2008–2009)
- (United States) Greg DeVito (2012–2015)

== Year-by-year ==
Year	Division	League	Regular season	Playoffs	Open Cup
2008	4	USL PDL	5th, Southeast	Did not qualify	Did not qualify
2009	4	USL PDL	4th, Southeast	Did not qualify	Did not qualify
2010	On Hiatus				
2011	On Hiatus				
2012	4	USL PDL	6th, Southeast	Did not qualify	Did not qualify
2013	4	USL PDL	2nd, Southeast	Conference Semi-finals	Did not qualify
2014	4	USL PDL	4th, Southeast	Did not qualify	2nd Round

Season	Games played	Wins	Losses	Ties	Home Wins	Home Losses	Home Ties	Away Wins	Away Losses	Away Ties	Goal Differential
2012	16	6	7	3	4	3	1	2	4	2	0
2013	15	10	4	1	6	1	0	4	3	1	9
2014	14	4	6	4	2	2	3	2	4	1	(4)
