= Daniel Johnson (soccer) =

American soccer player

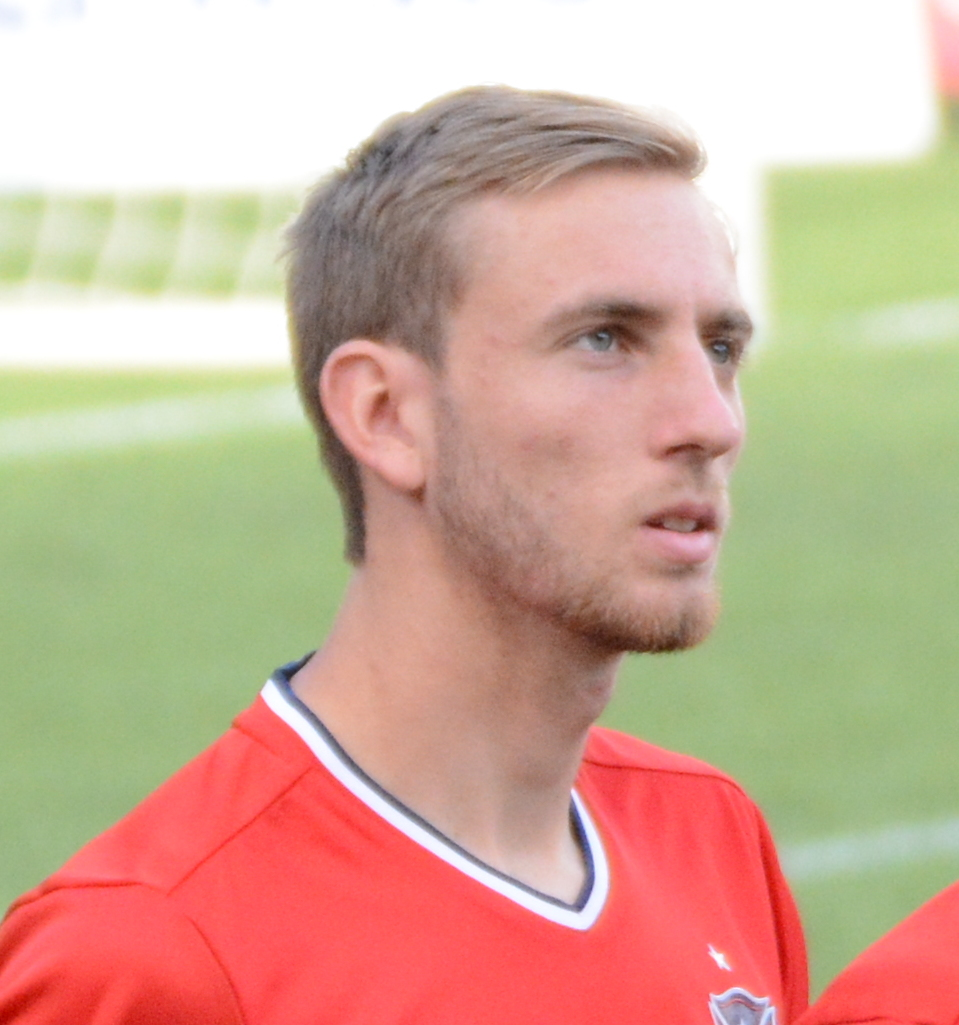
- Johnson with Chicago Fire in 2017

Personal information
- Full name: Daniel Gibson Johnson
- Date of birth: September 8, 1995 (age 31)
- Place of birth: Duluth, Georgia, United States
- Height: 1.75 m (5 ft 9 in)
- Position: Winger

Youth career
- 2009–2012: West Ham United

College career
| Years | Team | Apps | (Gls) |
| 2013–2014 | Maryland Terrapins | 23 | (0) |
| 2015–2016 | Louisville Cardinals | 41 | (7) |

Senior career*
| Years | Team | Apps | (Gls) |
| 2014 | Orlando City U-23 | 8 | (0) |
| 2015 | Des Moines Menace | 1 | (0) |
| 2016 | Portland Timbers U23s | 6 | (1) |
| 2017–2018 | Chicago Fire | 15 | (0) |
| 2019 | Birmingham Legion | 32 | (4) |
| Total | | 62 | (8) |
- * Club domestic league appearances and goals

Daniel Gibson Johnson (born September 8, 1995) is an American former soccer player who played as a midfielder.

== Career ==
=== Youth and college ===
Johnson played for West Ham United's youth academy from 2009 to 2012. After that, he played for the Louisville Cardinals in the NCAA.

=== Professional ===
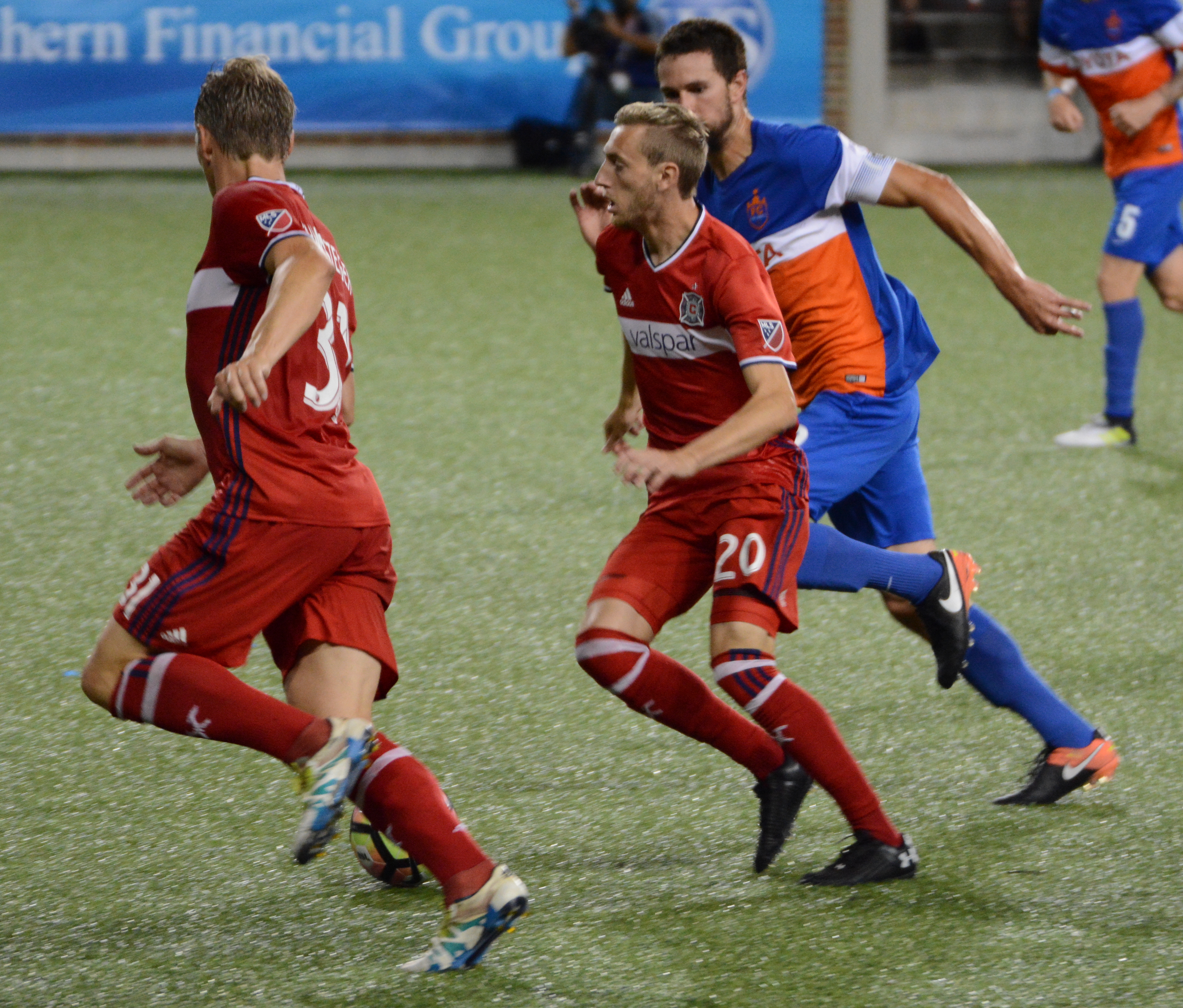
Johnson playing for Chicago Fire in a 2017 U.S. Open Cup match against FC Cincinnati

Johnson was drafted 11th overall by the Chicago Fire in the 2017 MLS SuperDraft. He played his first game on April 1, coming on as a substitute in a 2–2 draw against Montreal Impact.

Johnson was released by Chicago at the end of their 2018 season.

On February 15, 2019, Johnson signed with Birmingham Legion FC of the USL Championship.
