= Birmingham Hammers =

- Full name: Birmingham Hammers
- Nickname: Hammers
- Founded: July 10, 2013; 12 years ago
- Dissolved: November 30, 2018; 7 years ago
- Ground: Sicard Hollow Athletic Complex
- Capacity: 1,500
- League: USL League Two
- 2018: 4th, Deep South Division; Playoffs: DNQ
- Website: http://www.birminghamhammers.com

The Birmingham Hammers were an American soccer club based in Birmingham, Alabama (although they played in nearby Vestavia Hills). They competed in the fourth-division USL League Two. The Hammers played in the fourth-division National Premier Soccer League from 2016 to 2017.

== History ==
The club was founded as a grassroots effort in early-to-mid 2013 by Birmingham residents, Morgan Copes and John Killian. The two formed the club after they graduated from college in the hope to garner interest from the region's soccer scene. Later founders included Evon Noyes, Eric Lopez and Wade Honeycutt. Upon ongoing outreach, the group was able to form a formal club throughout 2014, and in 2015, the Hammers fielded their first ever team, who played independent friendlies during the spring and summer of 2015.

On October 1, 2015, it was announced that the Hammers would join the fourth division NPSL.

Year	Conference	Position	Played	Won	Loss	Tie	Goals for	Goals against	Goal difference	Points
2016 NPSL	Southeast Conference	6th	10	2	7	1	10	19	−9	7
2017 NPSL	Southeast Conference - Southeast West Division	5th	12	1	9	2	11	34	−23	5
2018 PDL	Southern Conference - Deep South Division	4th	14	5	5	4	25	28	−3	19
