= 2017 New England Revolution season =

New England Revolution
2017 season
- Owner: Robert Kraft
- Head coach: Jay Heaps (until September 18); Tom Soehn (interim) (from September 18)
- Stadium: Gillette Stadium; Foxborough, Massachusetts
- MLS: Conference: 7th Overall: 15th
- MLS Cup Playoffs: Did not qualify
- U.S. Open Cup: Quarterfinals
- Top goalscorer: League: Kei Kamara (12 goals); All: Kei Kamara (12 goals)
- Highest home attendance: League/All: 33,767 (Oct. 15 vs. New York City FC)
- Lowest home attendance: League: 10,487 (Apr. 19 vs. San Jose Earthquakes); All: 2,331 (Jul. 13 vs. New York Red Bulls)
- Average home league attendance: League: 19,367; All: 16,789
- Biggest win: 4 goals: NER 4–0 RSL (May 13); NER 4–0 ORL (Sep. 2)
- Biggest defeat: 7 goals: ATL 7–0 NER (Sep. 30)
Home colors	Away colors

The 2017 New England Revolution season was the club's 22nd season of existence, and their 22nd season in Major League Soccer, the top-flight of American soccer.

== Current squad ==
As of September 14, 2017. Source: New England Revolution Roster

No.	Name	Nationality	Position	Date of birth (age)	Previous club
Goalkeepers
1	Cody Cropper	(United States)	GK	February 16, 1993 (age 33)	(England) Milton Keynes Dons
18	Brad Knighton	(United States)	GK	February 6, 1985 (age 41)	(Canada) Vancouver Whitecaps FC
30	Matt Turner	(United States)	GK	June 24, 1994 (age 32)	(United States) Fairfield University
Defenders
2	Andrew Farrell	(United States)	CB	April 2, 1992 (age 34)	(United States) University of Louisville
4	Benjamin Angoua	(Ivory Coast)	LB	November 28, 1986 (age 39)	(France) Guingamp
8	Chris Tierney	(United States)	LB	January 9, 1986 (age 40)	(United States) University of Virginia
15	Je-Vaughn Watson	(Jamaica)	DF	October 22, 1983 (age 42)	(United States) F.C. Dallas
19	Antonio Delamea Mlinar	(Slovenia)	DF	June 10, 1991 (age 35)	(Slovenia) Olimpija Ljubljana
27	Joshua Smith	(United States)	DF	March 10, 1992 (age 34)	(United States) Burlingame Dragons FC
28	London Woodberry	(United States)	CB	May 28, 1991 (age 35)	(United States) Arizona United
Midfielders
5	Gershon Koffie	(Ghana)	MF	August 25, 1991 (age 35)	(Sweden) Hammarby Fotboll
6	Scott Caldwell	(United States)	M	March 15, 1991 (age 35)	(United States) University of Akron
11	Kelyn Rowe	(United States)	M	December 25, 1991 (age 34)	(United States) University of California, Los Angeles
12	Xavier Kouassi	(Ivory Coast)	M	December 28, 1989 (age 36)	(Switzerland) FC Sion
14	Diego Fagundez	(Uruguay)	M	February 14, 1995 (age 31)	(United States) New England Revolution Academy
16	Daigo Kobayashi	(Japan)	M	February 19, 1983 (age 43)	(Canada) Vancouver Whitecaps FC
21	Zachary Herivaux	(Haiti)	M	February 1, 1996 (age 30)	(United States) New England Revolution Academy
24	Lee Nguyen	(United States)	M	October 7, 1986 (age 39)	(Vietnam) Becamex Binh Duong
33	Donnie Smith	(United States)	M	December 7, 1990 (age 35)	(United States) Carolina Dynamo
Forwards
7	Brian Wright	(Canada)	F	March 24, 1995 (age 31)	(United States) Burlingame Dragons
9	Krisztián Németh	(Hungary)	F	January 5, 1989 (age 37)	(Qatar) Al-Gharafa
10	Teal Bunbury	(United States)	F	February 27, 1990 (age 36)	(United States) Sporting Kansas City
17	Juan Agudelo	(United States)	F	November 23, 1992 (age 33)	(Netherlands) FC Utrecht
23	Kei Kamara	(Sierra Leone)	F	September 1, 1984 (age 42)	(United States) Columbus Crew SC
88	Femi Hollinger-Janzen	(Benin)	F	December 14, 1993 (age 32)	(United States) Indiana University

=== Technical staff ===
Position	Staff
Head Coach	(United States) Jay Heaps
First Assistant Coach	(United States) Tom Soehn
Goalkeeping Coach	(Canada) Remi Roy
Strength and Conditioning Coach	(United States) Nick Downing
Technical Director	(United States) Ross Duncan
Soccer Operations Manager	(United States) Jason Gove
Soccer Operations Analyst	(United States) Tim Crawford
Equipment Manager	(United States) Scott Emmens
Head Athletic Trainer	(United States) Evan Allen
Assistant Athletic Trainer	(United States) Phil Madore
Massage Therapist	(United States) Glenn O'Connor
Head Team Physician	(United States) Scott Martin, M.D.

Last updated: May 12, 2016
Source: Club Staff

== Matches and results ==
=== Preseason ===
January 31, 2017 Desert Friendlies	Minnesota United FC	1–1	New England Revolution	Casa Grande, Arizona
12:30 EDT	Starikov 39'	Report	Kamara 78'	Stadium: Grande Sports World

February 3, 2017 Desert Friendlies	New York Red Bulls	0–2	New England Revolution	Casa Grande, Arizona
13:30 EDT		Report	Kamara 25'; Wright 88'	Stadium: Grande Sports World

February 5, 2017 Desert Friendlies	New England Revolution	1–0	NK Istra 1961	Casa Grande, Arizona
EDT	Bowen	Report		Stadium: Grande Sports World
Note: 60-minute scrimmage

February 7, 2017 Desert Friendlies	Sporting Kansas City	1–2	New England Revolution	Tucson, Arizona
13:00 EDT	Selbol 81'	Report	Smith 22'; Kamara 44'	Stadium: Kino Sports Complex

February 15, 2017 DDC	Houston Dynamo	2–0	New England Revolution	Tucson, Arizona
13:00 EDT				Stadium: Kino Sports Complex

February 18, 2017 DDC	Colorado Rapids	3–1	New England Revolution	Tucson, Arizona
15:00 EDT				Stadium: Kino Sports Complex

February 22, 2017 DDC	Sporting Kansas City	2–6	New England Revolution	Tucson, Arizona
13:00 EDT				Stadium: Kino Sports Complex

February 25, 2017 DDC	New York Red Bulls	0–2	New England Revolution	Tucson, Arizona
TBDEDT				Stadium: Kino Sports Complex

=== MLS regular season ===
==== Eastern Conference table ====
Pos	Team	Pld	W	L	T	GF	GA	GD	Pts	Qualification
5	Columbus Crew	34	16	12	6	53	49	+4	54	MLS Cup Knockout Round
6	New York Red Bulls	34	14	12	8	53	47	+6	50	MLS Cup Knockout Round
7	New England Revolution	34	13	15	6	53	61	−8	45	
8	Philadelphia Union	34	11	14	9	50	47	+3	42	
9	Montreal Impact	34	11	17	6	52	58	−6	39	

Source: MLS

==== Overall standings ====
Pos	Team	Pld	W	L	T	GF	GA	GD	Pts
13	FC Dallas	34	11	10	13	48	48	0	46
14	Real Salt Lake	34	13	15	6	49	55	−6	45
15	New England Revolution	34	13	15	6	53	61	−8	45
16	Philadelphia Union	34	11	14	9	50	47	+3	42
17	Montreal Impact	34	11	17	6	52	58	−6	39

Source: MLS
Rules for classification: 1) points; 2) total wins; 3) total goal differential; 4) total goals scored; 5) disciplinary points; 6) away goals scored; 7) away goal differential; 8) coin toss or drawing of lots

==== Matches ====
March 4, 2017 1	Colorado Rapids	1–0	New England Revolution	Commerce City, Colorado
18:00 EDT	Badji 52'; Calvert (yellow card) 68'; Powers (yellow card) 69'; Cronin (yellow card) 75'	Report	Tierney (yellow card) 14'; Kamara (yellow card) 79'	Stadium: Dick's Sporting Goods Park; Attendance: 16,126; Referee: Jose Carlos Rivero

March 18, 2017 2	FC Dallas	2–1	New England Revolution	Frisco, Texas
20:00 EDT	Lamah (yellow card) 37'; Figueroa (yellow card) 54'; Urruti 71', 77'; Barrios (yellow card) 89'	Report	Nguyen 10' (pen.); Agudelo (yellow card) 73'	Stadium: Toyota Stadium; Attendance: 16,150; Referee: Alan Kelly

March 25, 2017 3	New England Revolution	5–2	Minnesota United FC	Foxborough, Massachusetts
14:00 EDT	Agudelo 4', 41'; Kamara 21'; Nguyen 32' (pen.); Tierney 53' (pen.)	Report	Warner 15'; Kallman 49'	Stadium: Gillette Stadium; Attendance: 11,571; Referee: Ricardo Salazar

April 2, 2017 4	Portland Timbers	1–1	New England Revolution	Portland, Oregon
21:00 EDT	Valeri 14'	Report	Kouassi (yellow card) 44'; Rowe (yellow card) 47'; Nguyen 84'	Stadium: Providence Park; Attendance: 21,144; Referee: Kevin Stott

April 8, 2017 5	New England Revolution	2–0	Houston Dynamo	Foxborough, Massachusetts
14:00 EDT	Kamara 52'; Agudelo 72'	Report	Clark (yellow card) 16'	Stadium: Gillette Stadium; Attendance: 14,725; Referee: Silviu Petrescu

April 15, 2017 6	Chicago Fire	3–0	New England Revolution	Bridgeview, Illinois
17:00 EDT	Schweinsteiger 45'; Nikolić 47', 73'; Kappelhof (yellow card) 77'	Report	Watson (yellow card) 21' (yellow-red card) 27'	Stadium: Toyota Park; Attendance: 16,914; Referee: Ted Unkel

April 19, 2017 7	New England Revolution	0–0	San Jose Earthquakes	Foxborough, Massachusetts
19:30 EDT		Report	Godoy (yellow card) 27'; Bingham (yellow card) 85'	Stadium: Gillette Stadium; Attendance: 10,487; Referee: Hilario Grajeda

April 22, 2017 8	New England Revolution	2–2	D.C. United	Foxborough, Massachusetts
19:30 EDT	Nguyen 5'; Delamea (yellow card) 39'; Agudelo 48'; Kouassi (yellow card) 89'	Report	Jeffrey 26'; Le Toux (yellow card) 27' (goal) 28'	Stadium: Gillette Stadium; Attendance: 16,591; Referee: Jose Carlos Rivero

April 29, 2017 9	Seattle Sounders FC	3–3	New England Revolution	Seattle, Washington
22:00 EDT	Alfaro (yellow card) 44'; Lodiero 75'; Bruin (yellow card) 80' (goal) 85'; Alonso 88'	Report	Kobayashi 15'; Agudelo 26', 54'	Stadium: CenturyLink Field; Attendance: 43,230; Referee: Allen Chapman

May 6, 2017 10	Columbus Crew	2–0	New England Revolution	Columbus, Ohio
19:30 EDT	Kamara 13'; Mensah (yellow card) 15'; Higuain 53'; Naess (yellow card) 69'	Report	Watson (yellow card) 77'; Delamea (yellow card) 81'	Stadium: Mapfre Stadium; Attendance: 13,340; Referee: Mark Geiger

May 13, 2017 11	New England Revolution	4–0	Real Salt Lake	Foxborough, Massachusetts
19:30 EDT	Caldwell 4' (yellow card) 29'; Kamara 18'; Fagúndez 34'; Nguyen 41'; Farrell (yellow card) 79'	Report	Holness (yellow card) 35'; Velazco (yellow card) 44'; Hernández (yellow card) 80'; Silva (yellow card) 84'	Stadium: Gillette Stadium; Attendance: 21,096; Referee: Hilario Grajeda

May 21, 2017 12	New England Revolution	2–1	Columbus Crew	Foxborough, Massachusetts
14:30 EDT	Fagúndez 24', 34'; Farrell (red card) 90+3'	Report	Kamara 20'; Trapp (yellow card) 55'; Jahn (yellow card) 90+1'	Stadium: Gillette Stadium; Attendance: 18,651; Referee: Alan Kelly

May 27, 2017 13	New York Red Bulls	2–1	New England Revolution	Harrison, New Jersey
19:30 EDT	Wright-Phillips 47'; Royer 74'; Felipe (yellow card) 78'; Muyl (yellow card) 88'	Report	Nguyen 9'; Watson (yellow card) 39'; Kouassi (yellow card) 90+4'; Bunbury (yellow card) 90+5'	Stadium: Red Bull Arena; Attendance: 20,905; Referee: Ismail Elfath

May 31, 2017 14	New York City FC	2–2	New England Revolution	New York, New York
19:30 EDT	Harrison 17'; Camargo 64'; Villa (yellow card) 81'; Lopez (yellow card) 90'	Report	Kamara 24'; Koffie (yellow card) 29'; Kouassi 86'; Rowe (yellow card) 87'	Stadium: Yankee Stadium; Attendance: 20,193; Referee: Christopher Penso

June 3, 2017 15	New England Revolution	3–0	Toronto FC	Foxborough, Massachusetts
19:30 EDT	Angoua 17' (yellow card) 27'; Fagúndez 66'; Farrell (yellow card) 71'; Agudelo 85'	Report	Cooper (yellow card) 26'	Stadium: Gillette Stadium; Attendance: 21,764; Referee: Armando Villarreal

June 17, 2017 16	New England Revolution	1–2	Chicago Fire	Foxborough, Massachusetts
19:30 EDT	Rowe (yellow card) 21'; Delamea Mlinar 70'	Report	Nikolić 18'; Solignac 61' (de Leeuw)	Stadium: Gillette Stadium; Attendance: 21,548; Referee: Kevin Stott

June 23, 2017 17	Toronto FC	2–0	New England Revolution	Toronto, Ontario, Canada
20:00 EDT	Moor; Giovinco (yellow card) 22' (goal) 90+6' (Vázquez); Altidore (yellow card) 52'	Report	Delamea (yellow card) 50'	Stadium: BMO Field; Attendance: 27,261; Referee: Hilario Grajeda

July 2, 2017 18	Philadelphia Union	3–0	New England Revolution	Chester, Pennsylvania
17:00 EDT	Sapong 4' (pen.); Ilsinho; Alberg 78' (Medunjanin)	Report	Watson (yellow card) 45+3'; Angoua (yellow card) 68'	Stadium: Talen Energy Stadium; Attendance: 16,143; Referee: Chris Penso

July 5, 2017 19	New England Revolution	2–3	New York Red Bulls	Foxborough, Massachusetts
19:30 EDT	Bunbury 21' (Fagundez); Nguyen 26'; Angoua (yellow card) 55'; Delamea (yellow card) 77'	Report	Wright-Phillips 23' (yellow card) 78'; Royer (yellow card) 44' (goal) 55' (pen.); Zizzo (yellow card) 47'; Davis (yellow card) 76'; Verón 90' (Felipe)	Stadium: Gillette Stadium; Attendance: 13,924; Referee: Silviu Petrescu

July 22, 2017 20	New England Revolution	4–3	LA Galaxy	Foxborough, Massachusetts
19:30 EDT	Nguyen 16' (Fagundez); Kamara 34' (Fagundez); Farrell (yellow card) 38'; Delamea (yellow card) 56'; Tierney (yellow card) 66'; Fagundez (yellow card) 69'; Bunbury	Report	Steres; Jones (yellow card) 24'; Diallo (yellow card) 42'; McBean (yellow card) 44'; Lassiter 79'	Stadium: Gillette Stadium; Attendance: 27,441; Referee: Jorge Gonzalez

July 29, 2017 21	New England Revolution	3–0	Philadelphia Union	Foxborough, Massachusetts
19:30 EDT	Koffie (yellow card) 34'; Kamara; Agudelo	Report	Onyewu (yellow card) 29'; Wijnaldum (yellow card) 76'	Stadium: Gillette Stadium; Attendance: 18,584; Referee: Nima Saghafi

August 5, 2017 22	Chicago Fire	4–1	New England Revolution	Bridgeview, Illinois
20:30 EDT	Polster 8' (João Meira); Juninho 39' (Doody); Accam (yellow card) 45+1' de Leeuw 49' (Doody) (yellow card) 64'; Campbell (yellow card) 80'; Solignac 90+2' (Doody)	Report	Kamara 24' (Nguyen); Angoua (yellow card) 44'	Stadium: Toyota Park; Attendance: 20,214; Referee: Silviu Petrescu

August 12, 2017 23	New England Revolution	1–0	Vancouver Whitecaps FC	Foxborough, Massachusetts
20:00 EDT	Nguyen (yellow card) 45+3'; Bunbury 53' (Rowe); Kamara (yellow card) 63'; Watson (yellow card) 69'	Report	Jacobson (yellow card) 41'	Stadium: Gillette Stadium; Attendance: 19,911; Referee: Ismail Elfath

August 20, 2017 24	New York City FC	2–1	New England Revolution	New York, New York
18:00 EDT	Brillant (yellow card) 59'; Allen (yellow card) 75'; Villa 77'; Herrera (yellow card) 89'	Report	Angoua (yellow card) 53'; Bunbury 57'	Stadium: Yankee Stadium; Attendance: 22,415; Referee: Mark Geiger

August 26, 2017 25	D.C. United	1–0	New England Revolution	Washington, D.C.
19:00 EDT	Canouse (yellow card) 26'; Acosta; Sarvas (yellow card) 81'	Report	Dielna (yellow card) 63'; Kamara (yellow card) 65'	Stadium: RFK Stadium; Attendance: 13,539; Referee: Jose Carlos Rivero

September 2, 2017 26	New England Revolution	4–0	Orlando City SC	Foxborough, Massachusetts
19:00 EDT	Kamara; Agudelo (yellow card) 68'; Bunbury	Report	Pereira (yellow card) 56'; Aja (yellow card) 66' (yellow-red card) 80'; Rocha (yellow card) 86'	Stadium: Gillette Stadium; Attendance: 17,865; Referee: Robert Sibiga
Note: Kei Kamara's first career hat trick

September 9, 2017 27	New England Revolution	1–0	Montreal Impact	Foxborough, Massachusetts
19:30 EDT	Nguyen 68' (Bunbury) (yellow card) 90+1'	Report	Beland-Goyette (yellow card) 35'	Stadium: Gillette Stadium; Attendance: 20,080; Referee: Armando Villarreal

September 13, 2017 28	Atlanta United FC	7–0	New England Revolution	Atlanta, Georgia
19:00 EDT	Martínez 2' (Almirón), 31' (pen.), 39' (pen.); Pirez (yellow card) 23'; Walkes 45' (Garza); Kratz 70'; Asad 74'; Villalba 90'	Report	Farrell (yellow card) 6'; Koffie (yellow card) 8'; Kouassi (red card) 16'; Mlinar (red card) 38'	Stadium: Mercedes-Benz Stadium; Attendance: 42,511; Referee: Baldomero Toledo
Note: New England became the first team in MLS history to record zero shots in a match.

September 16, 2017 29	Sporting Kansas City	3–1	New England Revolution	Kansas City, Kansas
20:30 EDT	Gerso 16'; Diego Rubio (yellow card) 23'; Medranda (yellow card) 26'		Bunbury 4'; Németh (red card) 11'; Fagúndez (yellow card) 90+2'	Stadium: Children's Mercy Park; Attendance: 19,089; Referee: Jorge González

September 23, 2017 30	New England Revolution	2–1	Toronto FC	Foxborough, Massachusetts
17:00 EDT	Nguyen 82' (Tierney); Kamara (yellow card) 90+3'	Report	Vázquez (yellow card) 61'; Hasler 84' (Bradley)	Stadium: Gillette Stadium; Attendance: 19,303; Referee: Alan Kelly

September 27, 2017 31	Orlando City SC	6–1	New England Revolution	Orlando, Florida
19:30 EDT	Nocerino 22' (Yotún); Hines 32' (Yotún) (yellow card) 45'; Kaká (yellow card) 28' (goal) 43' (Dwyer), 77' (Dwyer); Pereira (yellow card) 33'; Dwyer 84' (Larin); Yotún 90' (Laryea)	Report	Kouassi (red card) 11'; Dielna (yellow card) 21'; Caldwell (yellow card) 29'; Nguyen 45+1' (yellow card) 90+4'; Delamea (yellow card) 57'; Angoua (yellow card) 86'	Stadium: Orlando City Stadium; Attendance: 23,018; Referee: Silviu Petrescu

September 30, 2017 32	New England Revolution	0–0	Atlanta United FC	Foxborough, Massachusetts
19:30 EDT		Report	González Pirez (yellow card) 21'	Stadium: Gillette Stadium; Attendance: 21,925; Referee: Dave Gantar

October 15, 2017 33	New England Revolution	2–1	New York City FC	Foxborough, Massachusetts
17:00 EDT	Dielna (yellow card) 49'; Fagundez 51' (Farrell) 90+2'; Farrell (yellow card) 78'; Agudelo (yellow card) 90+4'	Report	Harrison (yellow card) 26'; Herrera (yellow card) 44'; Matarrita (yellow card) 49'; Shelton 90+3' (Ring)	Stadium: Gillette Stadium; Attendance: 33,767; Referee: Nima Saghafi

October 22, 2017 34	Montreal Impact	2–3	New England Revolution	Montreal, Quebec, Canada
16:00 EDT	Fagundez 19'; Angoua (yellow card) 45+3'; Németh 46' (Fagundez); Tierney (yellow card) 84'; Rowe 90+6' (Kamara)	Report	Ciman (yellow card) 43'; Bernier 45+3' (pen.); Romero (yellow card) 51'; Dzemaili (yellow card) 62'; Mancosu 90' (Tabla)	Stadium: Saputo Stadium; Attendance: 20,681; Referee: Rubiel Vasquez

=== U.S. Open Cup ===
June 14, 2017 Fourth Round	New England Revolution	3–0	Rochester Rhinos	Providence, Rhode Island
19:30 EDT	Bunbury 44' (pen.); Smith 50' (Kobayashi); Herivaux 51'; Woodberry (yellow card) 62'	Report	Farrell (yellow card) 24' (yellow-red card) 40'	Stadium: Anderson Stadium; Attendance: 1,663; Referee: Henrik Karlsson

June 28, 2017 Fifth Round	New England Revolution	2–1	D.C. United	Boston, Massachusetts
19:30 EDT	Fagundez 44'; Woodberry (yellow card) 37'; Wright 48'; Smith (yellow card) 57'	Report	Ortiz 7' (Harkes); Jeffrey (yellow card) 10'; Korb (yellow card) 90+4'	Stadium: Jordan Field; Attendance: 2,572; Referee: Mark Kadlecik

July 13, 2017 Quarterfinal	New England Revolution	0–1	New York Red Bulls	Boston, Massachusetts
19:30 EDT	Delamea (yellow card) 14' (yellow-red card) FT; Tierney (yellow card) 67'; Angoua (red card) 75'; Farrell (yellow card) 89'	Report	Long (yellow card) 22'; Wright-Phillips 87' (Felipe); Felipe (yellow card) 90+3'; Kljestan (yellow card) 90+5'	Stadium: Jordan Field; Attendance: 2,331; Referee: Jorge Gonzalez

== Transfers ==
=== In ===
Per Major League Soccer and club policies terms of the deals do not get disclosed.

No.	Pos.	Nat.	Name	Age	Moving from	Type	Transfer window	Ends	Transfer fee	Source
7	FW	(Canada)	Brian Wright	22	Vermont Catamounts	Drafted	Pre-season	Undisclosed	SuperDraft	
19	DF	(Slovenia)	Antonio Mlinar Delamea	26	Olimpija Ljubljana	Transfer	Pre-season	Undisclosed		
4	DF	(Ivory Coast)	Benjamin Angoua	30	Guingamp	On Loan	Pre-season	Undisclosed		
88	FW	(Benin)	Femi Hollinger-Janzen	23	Minnesota United FC	Trade	Pre-season	Undisclosed		
27	DF	(United States)	Joshua Smith	25	Burlingame Dragons FC	Drafted	Pre-season	Undisclosed	SuperDraft	
5	MF	(Ghana)	Gershon Koffie	26	Hammarby Fotboll	On Loan	Mid-season	Undisclosed		
	DF	(France)	Claude Dielna	29	Sheffield Wednesday F.C.	Free	Mid-season	Undisclosed		
9		(Hungary)	Krisztián Németh	28	Al-Gharafa	Trade from Columbus Crew	Mid-season	Undisclosed		

==== Draft picks ====
Round	Selection	Pos.	Name	College
1	20	FW	(Canada) Brian Wright	Vermont
2	31	MF	(Lesotho) Napo Matsoso	Kentucky
4	75	DF	(United States) Joshua Smith	San Francisco

=== Out ===
No.	Pos.	Nat.	Name	Age	Moving to	Type	Transfer window	Transfer fee	Source
3	DF	(United States)	Jordan McCrary	24	Toronto FC II (United States)	Option Declined	Pre-season		
88	FW	(Benin)	Femi Hollinger-Janzen	23	Minnesota United FC (United States)	Drafted	Pre-season	Exp. Draft	
40	DF	(Guinea-Bissau)	Sambinha	24	Sporting B (Portugal)	Loan return	Pre-season	Free	
7	MF	(Ghana)	Gershon Koffie	25	Hammarby (Sweden)	Transfer	Pre-season	Free	.
22	GK	(United States)	Bobby Shuttleworth	30	Minnesota United FC	Trade	Pre-season		

== Player statistics ==
=== Top scorers ===
Place	Position	Number	Name	MLS	MLS Cup	Open Cup	Total
1	FW	23	(Sierra Leone) Kei Kamara	11	0	0	11
2	MF	24	(United States) Lee Nguyen	9	0	0	9
3	FW	17	(United States) Juan Agudelo	8	0	0	8
3	FW	10	(United States) Teal Bunbury	7	0	1	8
4	FW	14	(Uruguay) Diego Fagúndez	4	0	1	5
5	DF	4	(Ivory Coast) Benjamin Angoua	1	0	0	1
5	MF	6	(United States) Scott Caldwell	1	0	0	1
5	FW	7	(Canada) Brian Wright	0	0	1	1
5	DF	8	(United States) Chris Tierney	1	0	0	1
5	MF	12	(Ivory Coast) Xavier Kouassi	1	0	0	1
5	MF	16	(Japan) Daigo Kobayashi	1	0	0	1
5	DF	19	(Slovenia) Antonio Delamea Mlinar	1	0	0	1
5	MF	21	(Haiti) Zachary Herivaux	0	0	1	1
5	MF	33	(United States) Donnie Smith	0	0	1	1
Total				45	0	5	50

As of September 16, 2017.

== Awards ==
- Team Most Valuable Player: Antonio Delamea
- Team Golden Boot: Kei Kamara (12 G, 5 A)
- Team Defender of the Year: Antonio Delamea
- Team Humanitarian of the Year: Kelyn Rowe (4-time winner)
- Players' Player of the Year: Teal Bunbury
- UnitedHealthcare Youth Player of the Year: Joe Brito
- MLS Player of the Week: Juan Agudelo (Week 4), Kei Kamara (Week 26)
