= 2022 Bay Cities FC season =

American soccer team season

Bay Cities FC
2022 season
- Owner: Anders Perez
- Sporting director: Eric Bucchere
- Head coach: Anders Perez
- Stadium: Sequoia High School Stadium; Redwood City, California
- NISA: (Note: The club was 5th in the league overall, and 3rd in the Western Conference at the time of them suspending their season.)
- Playoffs: (Note: The club suspended their season before the playoffs were held.)
- U.S. Open Cup: Third round

The 2022 Bay Cities FC season was the club's first professional season and its first in the National Independent Soccer Association, one of the two third divisions in American soccer. The club's first match was on February 22, and on March 26 was the club's first competitive game. The club played in NISA until August 26, when financial difficulties forced the club to prematurely end the season.

== Background ==
Bay Cities FC announced its intention to play in the National Independent Soccer Association in April 2021. Following participation in the league's 2021 Independent Cup, finishing with a record of 0-1-1, the team was officially accepted into NISA for the 2022 season.

The team's first home game at Sequoia High School Stadium was a preseason friendly against Liga MX side Club Tijuana' Under-23 team. After trailing by two goals, Josiah Romero scored twice in the second half with the game ending in a draw, 2–2, in front of over 1,000 spectators.

== Season Squad ==
Squad No.	Name	Nationality	Position(s)	Date of birth (age)
Goalkeepers
0	Alonso Lara	(Mexico)	GK	October 10, 1991 (age 33)
1	Ian McGrane	(United States)	GK	November 22, 1995 (age 29)
99	Alan Cruz-Gomez	(United States)	GK	July 21, 1998 (age 27)
Defenders
2	Malik Shaheed	(United States)	DF	January 9, 1998 (age 27)
3	David Kinnear	(United States)	DF	January 9, 1999 (age 26)
4	Danny Turgeon	(United States)	DF	July 16, 1997 (age 28)
5	Jacob Penner	(United States)	DF	August 16, 1998 (age 27)
6	Jacob Goyen	(United States)	DF	April 9, 1999 (age 26)
8	Christian Dean	(United States)	CB	March 14, 1993 (age 32)
20	Jonathan Partida	(United States)	DF	September 18, 1997 (age 27)
21	Victor Romero Jr.	(United States)	DF	August 12, 1999 (age 26)
31	Mumbi Kwesele	(United States)	DF	February 26, 1995 (age 30)
Midfielders
12	Carlos Gomez-Zavala	(United States)	MF	July 20, 1999 (age 26)
14	Iván Valencia	(Mexico)	MF	January 23, 1999 (age 26)
18	Andres Jimenez	(United States)	MF	October 10, 1997 (age 27)
19	Gabriel Silveira	(United States)	MF	April 28, 1992 (age 33)
23	Antonio Jimenez	(United States)	MF	February 6, 1997 (age 28)
24	Andrew Paoli	(United States)	MF	January 6, 1999 (age 26)
Forwards
7	Marco Silveira	(Brazil)	FW	June 7, 1998 (age 27)
9	Anthony Orendain	(United States)	FW	March 10, 1998 (age 27)
10	Edson Cardona	(United States)	FW	December 8, 1998 (age 26)
11	Adolfo Trujillo	(United States)	FW	September 19, 1999 (age 25)
15	Kevin Salto Aguilar	(United States)	FW	October 11, 1999 (age 25)
17	Josiah Romero	(United States)	FW	September 5, 1997 (age 27)
77	Rei Dorwart	(United States)	FW	March 22, 1998 (age 27)

Last updated: 15 September 2022.
Source: Bay Cities F.C., NISA

== Transfers ==
=== Transfers out ===
Date	Pos.	Player	To	Details	Ref.
April 30, 2022	GK	(United States) Ian McGrane	(United States) St. Louis City SC 2	Undisclosed fee	
June 11, 2022	DF	(United States) Christian Dean	(United States) Forward Madison FC	Undisclosed fee	
September 6, 2022	FW	(United States) Josiah Romero	(United States) FC Tucson		
September 29, 2022	DF	(United States) Jonathan Partida	(United States) Northern Colorado Hailstorm FC		

== Friendlies ==
February 22 Preseason	Sacramento Republic FC	3–0	Bay Cities FC	Sacramento, California
4:00 p.m. PST	Jauregui; López	Report		Stadium: Cosumnes River College
Note: Played behind Closed-doors

February 26 Preseason	Napa Valley 1839 FC	3–0	Bay Cities FC	Napa, California
4:00 p.m. PST	Alcarria 36'; Ortiz 40'; Manzo 45'	Report		Stadium: Dodd Stadium

March 5 Preseason	Pacific Tigers	3–1	Bay Cities FC	Stockton, California
2:00 p.m. PST	Goal	Report	Romero 60'	Stadium: Knoles Field

March 9 Preseason	San Jose Earthquakes II	3–1	Bay Cities FC	San Jose, California
11:00 a.m. PST	Goal	Report	Dean 11'	Stadium: CEFCU Stadium

March 12 Preseason	Bay Cities FC	4–1	Menlo Oaks	Redwood City, California
2:00 p.m. PST	Dean 26'; Turgeon 30'; Cardona 38'; Romero 66'	Report	Goal	Stadium: Cañada College

March 19 Preseason	Bay Cities FC (United States)	2–2	(Mexico) Club Tijuana U-23	Redwood City, California
7:00 p.m. PDT	Romero 60', 78'	Report	Goal	Stadium: Sequoia High School Stadium; Attendance: 1,000

May 18 Preseason	Stanford Cardinal	6–0	Bay Cities FC	Palo Alto, California
6:00 p.m. PST	Kiil 13'; Cilley 31'; Adnan 43'; Purchase 65', 84'; Tingey 70'	Report		Stadium: Maloney Field at Laird Q. Cagan Stadium; Attendance: 500

August 3 Friendly	Bay Cities FC (United States)	0–1	Guatemala U-20	Redwood City, California
7:30 p.m. PDT		Report	29'	Stadium: Sequoia High School; Attendance: 3,500

== Competitions ==
=== National Independent Soccer Association ===
==== Standings — West Division ====
Pos	Team	Pld	W	D	L	GF	GA	GD	Pts	Qualification
1	California United Strikers FC	14	11	2	1	24	6	+18	35	Qualification for the semi-finals
2	Albion San Diego	10	4	4	2	14	12	+2	16	Qualification for the play-offs
3	Bay Cities FC	12	4	3	5	18	18	0	15	Qualification for the play-offs
4	Los Angeles Force	11	2	4	5	7	14	−7	10	
5	Valley United FC (Note: Valley United FC withdrew from the league and their playing record of P9 W1 D1 L7 GF4 GA21 was expunged.)	0	0	0	0	0	0	0	0	Withdrew from the league

Updated to match(es) played on August 20, 2022. Source: nisasoccer.com

==== Results summary ====
Overall								Home						Away					
Pld	W	D	L	GF	GA	GD	Pts	W	D	L	GF	GA	GD	W	D	L	GF	GA	GD
4	0	2	2	3	6	−3	2	0	0	1	0	2	−2	0	2	1	3	4	−1

Last updated: April 24, 2022.
Source: Match reports

==== Match results ====
March 26 1	Los Angeles Force	0–0	Bay Cities FC	Pomona, California
7:00 PM PDT	Ramos (yellow card) 52'; O'Brien (yellow card) 61'; Goñi (yellow card) 89'	Report; Broadcast	Penner (yellow card) 50'; Valencia (yellow card) 66'	Stadium: Garey High School Stadium

April 2 2	California United Strikers FC	0–0	Bay Cities FC	Irvine, California
7:00 PM PDT	Hogbin (yellow card) 9'; Treinen (yellow card) 25'; Medina (yellow card) 27'; Liborio (yellow card) 87'	Report	Aguilar (yellow card) 16'; Orendain (yellow card) 55'	Stadium: Championship Soccer Stadium

April 9 3	Bay Cities FC	0–2	Valley United FC	Redwood City, California
7:00 PM PDT	Kinnear (yellow card) 35'; Romero (yellow card) 45' (yellow-red card) 82'	Report	Otoo 1'; Lafarge (yellow card) 11'; Troncoso 59'	Stadium: Sequoia High School Stadium; Attendance: 0

April 23 4	California United Strikers FC	4–3	Bay Cities FC	Irvine, California
7:00 PM PDT	Lopez 7'; Nuño 39', 90'; Contreras 75'	Report	Penner (yellow card) 11'; Orendain 29', 79'; Valencia 45'; Dean (yellow card) 64'	Stadium: Championship Soccer Stadium; Attendance: 1,445

April 30 5	Bay Cities FC	v	Albion San Diego	Redwood City, California
7:00 PM PDT		Report		Stadium: Sequoia High School Stadium

May 7 6	Los Angeles Force	v	Bay Cities FC	TBD
7:00 PM PDT		Report		Stadium: TBD

May 14 7	Bay Cities FC	v	California United Strikers FC	Redwood City, California
7:00 PM PDT		Report		Stadium: Sequoia High School Stadium

May 21 8	Maryland Bobcats FC	v	Bay Cities FC	Germantown, Maryland
7:00 PM EDT		Report		Stadium: Maryland SoccerPlex

May 25 9	Michigan Stars FC	v	Bay Cities FC	Romeo, Michigan
7:00 PM EDT		Report		Stadium: Romeo High School Stadium

May 28 10	Chattanooga FC	v	Bay Cities FC	Chattanooga, Tennessee
7:30 PM EDT		Report		Stadium: Finley Stadium

June 1 11	Bay Cities FC	v	Flower City Union	Redwood City, California
7:00 PM PDT		Report		Stadium: Sequoia High School Stadium

June 5 12	Albion San Diego	v	Bay Cities FC	San Diego, California
3:00 PM PDT		Report		Stadium: Canyon Crest Academy Stadium

June 18 13	Bay Cities FC	v	Chattanooga FC	Redwood City, California
7:00 PM PDT		Report		Stadium: Sequoia High School Stadium

July 1 14	Bay Cities FC	v	Valley United FC	TBD
7:00 PM MST		Report		Stadium: TBD

July 9 15	Bay Cities FC	v	Los Angeles Force	Redwood City, California
7:00 PM PDT		Report		Stadium: Sequoia High School Stadium

August 10 16	Bay Cities FC	v	AC Syracuse Pulse	Redwood City, California
7:00 PM PDT		Report		Stadium: Sequoia High School Stadium

August 13 17	Valley United FC	v	Bay Cities	TBD
7:00 PM MST		Report		Stadium: TBD

August 20 18	Bay Cities FC	v	Maryland Bobcats FC	Redwood City, California
7:00 PM PDT		Report		Stadium: Sequoia High School Stadium

August 27 19	Bay Cities FC	—	California United Strikers FC	Redwood City, California
7:00 PM PDT		Report		Stadium: Sequoia High School Stadium
Note: Match canceled following Bay Cities FC suspending operations.

September 4 20	AC Syracuse Pulse	—	Bay Cities FC	Syracuse, New York
7:00 PM EDT		Report		Stadium: Lazer Stadium
Note: Match canceled following Bay Cities FC suspending operations.

September 7 21	Flower City Union	—	Bay Cities FC	Rochester, New York
8:30 PM EDT		Report		Stadium: Marina Auto Stadium
Note: Match canceled following Bay Cities FC suspending operations.

September 14 22	Bay Cities FC	—	Michigan Stars FC	Redwood City, California
7:00 PM PDT		Report		Stadium: Sequoia High School Stadium
Note: Match canceled following Bay Cities FC suspending operations.

September 17 23	Bay Cities FC	—	Valley United FC	Redwood City, California
7:00 PM PDT		Report		Stadium: Sequoia High School Stadium
Note: Match canceled following Bay Cities FC suspending operations.

September 24 24	Albion San Diego	—	Bay Cities FC	San Diego, California
6:00 PM PDT		Report		Stadium: Canyon Crest Academy Stadium
Note: Match canceled following Bay Cities FC suspending operations.

October 1 25	Bay Cities FC	—	Los Angeles Force	Redwood City, California
7:00 PM PDT		Report		Stadium: Sequoia High School Stadium
Note: Match canceled following Bay Cities FC suspending operations.

October 15 26	Bay Cities FC	—	Albion San Diego	Redwood City, California
7:00 PM PDT		Report		Stadium: Sequoia High School Stadium
Note: Match canceled following Bay Cities FC suspending operations.

=== U.S. Open Cup ===
As a National Independent Soccer Association club, Bay Cities FC made its Open Cup debut in the Second Round.

April 6 Second Round	Bay Cities FC (NISA) (California)	2–1	(California) Monterey Bay FC (USLC)	San Jose, California
7:30 pm PDT	Rei Dorwart 55'; Edson Cardona 90+1'	Report	Crawford 87'	Stadium: PayPal Park; Attendance: 1,754; Referee: Turan Özdemir

19 April Third round	San Jose Earthquakes (MLS) (California)	5–0	(California) Bay Cities FC (NISA)	San Jose, California
7:30 pm PDT	Skahan 25'; Marie 36'; Cowell 59' (pen.); Taskiris 83'; Bouda 88'	Report	Turgeon (yellow card) 16'	Stadium: PayPal Park; Attendance: 6,598; Referee: Malik Badawi
