= San Francisco Glens =

American soccer club

- Full name: San Francisco Glens SC
- Nicknames: The Glens; Green and White; Blanco y Verde
- Short name: SFG
- Founded: 1961; 65 years ago
- Stadium: San Francisco Glens Stadium (Treasure Island, San Francisco)
- Capacity: TBD
- Coach: Liam Guest (men) / Jessica Hewins (women)
- League: USL League Two / USL W League
- 2024: League Two: 3rd, NorCal Division; Playoffs: None W League: 3rd, NorCal Division; Playoffs: None
- Website: sfglens.com
Home colours

San Francisco Glens Soccer Club, commonly known as SF Glens, is an American soccer club based in San Francisco that was founded in 1961. Their men's first team currently competes in USL League Two and their women's first team in the USL W League, both in the fourth tier of the American soccer pyramid.

Before establishing a USL League Two franchise in 2018, the Glens had been a longtime member of the San Francisco Soccer Football League (SFSFL) and were once affiliated with the San Francisco Seals' PDL team, which is now defunct. The Glens continue to field three SFSFL teams, but the USL League Two franchise is now the club's official first team.

Since the hiring of Executive Director Mike McNeill, who also doubles as General Manager of the USL2 first team, the club has grown from two local youth teams to the largest soccer club in San Francisco. The Glens' nationally renowned academy program is the only one in the city with all age groups for MLS Next, that begins at Under-13 level and runs concurrently through the Under-19 level. In 2022, The U19 team became the first San Francisco team to advance to the MLS NEXT Cup final, where they were edged by the New England Revolution 1-0.

Combined as one entity (USL League Two and USL W League first teams, SFSFL second, third, and fourth teams, and SF Glens Academy youth teams), the Glens field over 90 teams and over 1,300 active players.

The Glens also have ties abroad as the official North American partner of 2. Bundesliga club Holstein Kiel. In addition to having the MLS NEXT full pathway, they are the only youth club in San Francisco with membership in the USL Academy.

They also have an official partnership with the San Jose Earthquakes of Major League Soccer. Recent examples of that arrangement is current U.S. Youth National Team midfielder Cruz Medina, who played with the Glens Academy before joining the Earthquakes, as well as the Glens hosting MLS Next Pro games for the Quakes in San Francisco.

== History ==
=== Beginnings ===
The Glens were founded on January 28, 1961 by Dr. Michael McFadden as one of a number of Irish American amateur sides that had emerged in the SFSFL during the 1960s. The emergence of the Glens during this period was based on the coaching of Irishman Neil Hagan coupled with a talented crop of young players like Tom and Steve Ryan, Jim Boyle, and Tom and Tim Harvey, among others.

It was also during these early years when the club struck up a friendship with Celtic F.C. that still endures today, when the European giants visited San Francisco in 1966 to play two friendly matches at Kezar Stadium and provided the Glens with their spare strips and they became the Glens first team kits for a number of years.

=== National Amateur Success ===
The result of Hagan's leadership was promotion to the SFSFL's Premier division by the end of the decade. The Glens went on to national prominence by advancing all the way to the National Amateur Cup final in 1979 where they lost 1–0 to Atlanta Datagraphic. Their national success also spilled over into qualification for the prestigious U.S. Open Cup three times in a five-year stretch from 1978 to 1982.

=== SFSFL Title Teams ===
The untimely death of Hagan in 1981, who died on the field while coaching the Glens, left a void that might have been the end of other amateur clubs. However, Sean Shannon stepped into the spotlight and quietly remolded the team into a championship-winning outfit by bringing in players such as Paul Mitchell and Mal Roche. By 1984, the Glens captured their first SFSFL championship in 1984—the first by an Irish side. In 1990, they returned to the National Amateur Cup final that season. Unfortunately, they were on the wrong side of another 1–0 result, this time to the St. Petersburg Kickers. Three years later under Shannon, the Glens captured their second SFSFL title.

=== Return to the SFSFL ===
After a brief hiatus, the SF Glens returned to the SFSFL in 2015 with a Premier Division and reserve team open to all comers. Three years later behind coach Bill Chu, the SFSFL Glens earned a berth in the California Soccer Association North (CSAN) State Cup Final, falling to Club Marin in extra time, 4–2.

=== A New Era in USL League Two ===
In 2018, the Glens announced the establishment of a new franchise in the USL Premier Development League with dual intentions: to create a top of the pyramid for their SF Glens Academy youth program and SFSFL teams, and also to set a foundation to enter the professional ranks in the future. J. Ramon Estevez was hired as the PDL franchise's inaugural team president/general manager and Javier Ayala-Hil as head coach. Mike McNeill, executive director of football for the youth side, doubled as a member of the PDL front office as well.

Though the Glens missed the playoffs in their first PDL season, they closed the campaign on a four-game unbeaten streak and were one of only two teams to take points from eventual Southwest Division champion FC Golden State Force.

In September 2018, the club announced that U.S. World Cup veteran and MLS Cup champion Jimmy Conrad had agreed to become their new technical director and associate head coach. In December 2018, Mike McNeill took on the reins of the team presidency. One month later, the Glens had four players selected in the 2019 MLS SuperDraft and two (Sam Junqua and Roy Boateng) in the first round—a first for any San Francisco club and the third-most among all clubs in the PDL, now rebranded as USL League Two.

The Glens entered an official partnership with 2. Bundesliga club Holstein Kiel in 2019, as San Francisco and Kiel are sister cities. The team had a tough USL League Two season on the field, but Nabilai Kibunguchy stood out as a midfielder on the Western Conference Team of the Year.

In February 2020, the club announced that Ayala-Hil would step down as head coach and McNeill named Conrad his successor. However, the 2020 USL League Two season was canceled due to safety concerns stemming from the COVID-19 pandemic.

In March 2021, the club announced the future construction of a soccer-specific facility at Treasure Island, a first for a local club in the 120-year history of soccer in San Francisco. Meanwhile, coaches Bill Chu and Cameron Chu led a banner year for the Glens' SFSFL teams, as the Second Team qualified for the Premier Division playoffs, the Third Team finished in the top four of the Majors Division, and the Under-23 Fourth Team won the First Division.

The 2022 USL League Two season saw changes to the staff, with Conrad returning to his original role as technical director and Gabe Saucedo elevating from head associate coach to head coach, as well as Ryan Maquiñana taking on the USL General Manager role. The result was a finish in the top four of the Southwest Division and a national playoff berth for the first time in club history. In the Western Conference Quarterfinals, the Glens traveled to Seattle to upset top-seeded Capital FC (the rebranded Portland Timbers U23) 3-2, but fell by the same score in extra time in the semifinals to host Ballard FC. Max Chrétien led the team with nine goals and five assists, while Academy product Diego Grande added eight scores of his own. Kevyn Lo was named to the Western Conference Team of the Year.

The SFSFL teams enjoyed another successful season in 2022, with the Second Team qualifying for the playoffs for the second consecutive season, the Third Team winning the Majors Division, and the Under-23 Fourth Team finishing runners-up in the third tier. The SFSFL also held their 120th Anniversary Open Cup in August of that year for all divisions in the league and it resulted in an all-Glens final, with the Under-23 team defeating the Second Team 2-1 to take home the trophy.

On September 7, 2022, the Glens broke ground on their new facility at Treasure Island with Mayor London Breed one of the guest speakers. Two days later, they hosted the San Jose Earthquakes' second team at Negoesco Stadium and ran operations for their MLS Next Pro game against Real Monarchs. A sellout crowd was on hand to watch the first professional soccer game in the city since the now-defunct San Francisco Deltas won the NASL championship game at Kezar Stadium in 2017.

The 2023 campaign saw original USL League Two coach Javier Ayala-Hil return to the staff, now as Saucedo's head associate coach. The team challenged for the new NorCal Division title all season as they set club records for regular-season wins (9), points (28), and table position (second). They also swept crosstown rival SF City FC in the derby for the first time. Chrétien repeated as leading scorer with 10 goals and was named NorCal Division Player of the Year. Once again, the Glens advanced to the national playoffs, where they upset top-seeded Redlands FC on the road 2-1 to advance to the Western Conference Semifinals for the second consecutive season. However, the run concluded with a loss on the road to former divisional rival Ventura County Fusion.

Former Glens defender Liam Guest was elevated from assistant to head coach for the 2024 USL League Two season and the team started strong, shooting to the top of the NorCal Division table after sweeping defending champ Monterey Bay FC 2 and blowing out Oakland Roots Project 51O, 6-0. However, a late swoon pushed the Green and White to a third-place finish and prevented them from making their third consecutive playoff appearance.

On the SFSFL side, Chu led the second team to one of their best starts in 20 years, going 9-1-5 to place third in the Premier Division table at the halfway point of the campaign.

=== Glens add Women's First Team ===
In December 2022, the club announced the addition of a women's first team in the new NorCal Division of the USL W League, with Mike Sharabi announced as head coach and Heath Piper as lead assistant. Their first signing was Stanford National Freshman of the Year and U.S. Under-20 defender Elise Evans. The team started out strong, racing out to a 9-0-0 record and earning the No. 1 national ranking in the USL W League five weeks in a row. Ultimately the Glens won the NorCal Division Championship and Western Conference Championship, blasting Oakland Soul SC 5-1 in the semifinals and outlasting California Storm 2-1. The Girls in Green saw their magical run end in the closing seconds of regulation in the National Semifinal to eventual USL W League champions Indy Eleven, 3-2. Nádia Gomes was named USL W National Player of the Year and USL W NorCal Division Player of the Year after notching 16 goals and 9 assists. Defender Elle Piper joined Gomes on the USL W National Team of the Year, and Ryan Maquiñana was named USL W National Executive of the Year.

Jessica Hewins took over as head coach for the 2024 USL W season, with forwards Gomes, Miri O'Donnell and Amy Sayer signing pro contracts with the NWSL's Chicago Stars, Sweden's Kristianstads DFF, and Portugal's Sporting C.P. respectively. Maquiñana also departed for a front-office position with the San Jose Earthquakes. Despite the changes, the majority of the roster remained intact. The Glens led the NorCal Division for most of the season, rising to as high as No. 10 in the national rankings, before two late setbacks pushed them into third and out of postseason contention. Forward Karlie Lema later signed a pro contract with NWSL club Bay FC, who ironically announced their new training facility on Treasure Island would neighbor the Glens' stadium.

== Supporters ==
The SF Glens supporters' group is known as the SF Glens Brigade, or Briogáid Ghleann (as it is known in Irish Gaelic as a nod to the club's Irish roots). They currently meet at Skyline College for matches and travel on the road to support the club.

== Kit sponsors ==
The SF Glens made history when they announced that global brand Carlsberg would be the presenting sponsor for their inaugural season kit, as Liverpool F.C., Wimbledon F.C., and F.C. Copenhagen are the only other club teams in association soccer to ever don the renowned beer company's logo on the front of their jerseys. The Glens' other kit sponsors were Soccerloco, Rubica, and Thomas Quinn Law. In addition, the club entered a contract with Casa Sanchez Foods to feature the iconic Jimmy the Cornman logo on their coaches' apparel. In 2019, Powerade became the club's training kit sponsor. Ahead of the 2024 USL League Two and USL W League seasons, the Glens announced a multi-year front-of-kit partnership with Guinness.

Period	Kit manufacturer	Main shirt sponsor	Training gear sponsor
2018	Nike	Carlsberg	Casa Sanchez
2019	Nike	Carlsberg, Speakeasy	Carlsberg
2020	Nike	Carlsberg, Speakeasy	Powerade
2021	(No season)	(No season)	(No season)
2022	Condor Soccer	Carlsberg	Powerade
2023	Condor Soccer	Carlsberg	None
2024	Lexa	Guinness	Guinness
2025	Lexa	Guinness	Guinness
2026	Aretyn	Guinness	Guinness

== Squad ==
=== Current USL League Two squad ===
The following 18 players were named in the squad for the USL League Two regular season game against Davis Legacy on June 16, 2023.

Note: Flags indicate national team as defined under FIFA eligibility rules; some limited exceptions apply. Players may hold more than one non-FIFA nationality.

No.	Pos.	Nation	Player
2	DF	CAN	Nathan Simeon
4	DF	USA	Matthew Duggan
5	DF	USA	Dennis Sánchez
6	MF	USA	Dominic Valdivia
7	FW	USA	Diego Grande
8	MF	NED	Max Hamelink
9	FW	NZL	Max Chrétien
10	MF	USA	Gabriel Bracken Serra
11	MF	NED	Joep Wouters

No.	Pos.	Nation	Player
13	MF	USA	Kian Jones
15	MF	USA	Adrian Medina
16	DF	USA	Shayan Charalaghi
18	DF	USA	Jack Singer
19	FW	USA	Nonso Adimabua
30	GK	USA	Kevin Box
32	MF	USA	Angel Iñiguez
33	FW	USA	Lorenzo Hernández

=== Current USL W League squad ===
The following 18 players were named in the squad for the USL W League Away Game against The Olympic Club on June 18, 2023.

Note: Flags indicate national team as defined under FIFA eligibility rules; some limited exceptions apply. Players may hold more than one non-FIFA nationality.

No.	Pos.	Nation	Player
1	GK	USA	Bianca Dominguez
2	DF	USA	Gianna Yslava
3	FW	USA	Jessie Halladay
4	FW	USA	Maia Beltrán
5	FW	USA	Maddy Samilo
6	DF	USA	Amaya Bautista
7	FW	POR	Nádia Gomes
8	DF	USA	Elle Piper
9	MF	USA	Peyton Marcisz

No.	Pos.	Nation	Player
10	MF	USA	Yuna McCormack
11	DF	USA	Camryn Penn
12	MF	USA	Kaylee Kim
13	FW	USA	Jasmine Aikey
14	DF	USA	Emmie Ennis
18	DF	USA	Elise Evans
20	DF	USA	Jennie Immethun
21	DF	USA	Kathryn Kelly
25	MF	USA	Thy Tran

== Record ==
=== SFSFL (top team only) ===
Year	Division	League	Regular season	Playoffs
2000	2	SFSFL Majors	6th	
2001	2	SFSFL Majors	1st	
2002	1	SFSFL Premier	9th	
2003	1	SFSFL Premier	7th	
2004	1	SFSFL Premier	5th	
2005	1	CPSA	1st	
2006	1	CPSA	3rd	
2007	1	CPSA		
2008	1	CPSA	5th	
2015	1	SFSFL Premier	3rd	Semifinals
2016	1	SFSFL Premier	9th	
2017	1	SFSFL Premier	6th	
2018	1	SFSFL Premier	8th	
2019	1	SFSFL Premier	5th	
2020	1	SFSFL Premier	No season due to COVID-19 pandemic	
2021	1	SFSFL Premier	4th	Semifinals
2022	1	SFSFL Premier	6th	
2023	1	SFSFL Premier	5th	
2024	1	SFSFL Premier	3rd	Semifinals
2025	1	SFSFL Premier	6th	

=== USL League Two ===
Year	Division	League	Regular season	Playoffs	Open Cup
2018	4	USL PDL	7th, Southwest	did not qualify	did not qualify
2019	4	USL League Two	8th, Southwest	did not qualify	did not qualify
2020	4	USL League Two	Season canceled due to COVID-19 pandemic	N/A	N/A
2021	4	USL League Two	Did not play due to COVID-19 pandemic	N/A	N/A
2022	4	USL League Two	4th, Southwest	Western Conference Semifinals	did not qualify
2023	4	USL League Two	2nd, NorCal	Western Conference Semifinals	did not qualify
2024	4	USL League Two	3rd, NorCal	did not qualify	did not qualify
2025	4	USL League Two	3rd, NorCal	did not qualify	did not qualify
2026	4	USL League Two	4th, NorCal	did not qualify	did not qualify

=== USL W League ===
Year	Division	League	Regular season	Conference Playoffs	National Playoffs
2023	4	USL W League	1st, NorCal	Western Conference Champions	National Semifinals
2024	4	USL W League	3rd, NorCal	did not qualify	did not qualify
2025	4	USL W League	8th, NorCal	did not qualify	did not qualify

== Former Glens who moved on to pro soccer (by club of entry) ==
The following players have signed with or were drafted by a professional football club after playing in SF Glens SC's USL, SFSFL or Academy teams (as of July 12, 2026).

=== Men (44) ===
- (United States) Steve Ryan - 1970s - signed by San Jose Earthquakes, 1979
- (United States) Derek Evans - 1970s - signed by Edmonton Drillers, 1979
- (United States) Sam Junqua - 2018 - selected in 2019 MLS SuperDraft by Houston Dynamo (1st round, 8th overall)
- (Ghana) Roy Boateng - 2018 - selected in 2019 MLS SuperDraft by New York Red Bulls (1st round, 16th overall)
- (Japan) Shinya Kadono - 2018 - selected in 2019 MLS SuperDraft by D.C. United (3rd round, 72nd overall)
- (United States) Sam Ebstein - 2018 - selected in 2019 MLS SuperDraft by FC Dallas (4th round, 87th overall)
- (Eritrea) Yohannes Harish - 2018-19 - signed by Oakland Roots SC, 2019
- (United States) Luke Dennison - 2018 - signed by Longford Town FC, 2019
- (United States) Aydan Bowers - 2019 - signed by FC Helsingor, 2019
- (United States) Amir Bashti - 2019 - signed by Atlanta United 2, 2019
- (United States) Salifu Jatta - 2019 - signed by Oakland Roots SC, 2019
- (United States) Drake Callender - 2019^ - signed by Inter Miami CF, 2019
- (United States) Isaiah Dargan - 2018-19 - signed by Chattanooga Red Wolves, 2020
- (United States) Simon Lekressner - 2019^ - selected in 2020 MLS SuperDraft by New England Revolution (2nd round, 30th overall)
- (United States) Andrew Konstantino - 2018-19 - signed by Reno 1868 FC, 2020
- (United States) Jonathan Orozco - 2019 - signed by Oakland Roots SC, 2020
- (United States) Josiah Romero - 2019 - signed by Oakland Roots SC, 2020
- (United States) Arda Bulut - 2018-19 - signed by Louisville City FC, 2020
- (United States) Nabilai Kibunguchy - 2019 - selected in 2021 MLS SuperDraft by Minnesota United FC (1st round, 18th overall)
- (United States) Roberto Llamas - 2019 - signed by Michigan Stars FC, 2020
- (United States) Tyler Moss - 2019 - signed by FC Tucson, 2022
- (United States) Zach Ryan - 2019 - signed by New York Red Bulls, 2022
- (United States) Rei Dorwart - 2018-19 - signed by Bay Cities FC, 2022
- (United States) Andrew Paoli - 2018 - signed by Bay Cities FC, 2022
- (United States) Gabe Silveira - 2018 - signed by Bay Cities FC, 2022
- (United States) C.J. Grey - 2018 - signed by San Jose Earthquakes II, 2022
- (United States) Cruz Medina - 2017-19^^ - signed by San Jose Earthquakes, 2022
- (United States) Corey Lundeen - 2022 - signed by Albion San Diego, 2023
- (United States) Kyle Colonna - 2019 - signed by New Mexico United, 2023
- (United States) Roka Tsunehara - 2017-19^^^ - signed by San Jose Earthquakes II, 2023
- (United States) Ryan Dieter - 2021-22 - signed by Monterey Bay FC, 2024
- (United States) Sean Bilter - 2022-23 - signed by The Town FC, 2024
- (France) Junior Mailly - 2022-23 - signed by Maharlika F.C., 2024
- (United States) Shayan Charalaghi - 2018-24 - signed by Stallion Laguna F.C., 2024
- (United States) Fahmi Ibrahim - 2023-24 - signed by Stallion Laguna F.C., 2024
- (United States) Jack Singer - 2022, 2024 - signed by Las Vegas Lights FC, 2025
- (United States) Nonso Adimabua - 2023-24 - signed by The Town FC, 2025
- (United States) Diogo Baptista - 2024 - signed by The Town FC, 2025
- (United States) Adrian Guzman - 2019-22, 2025 - signed by A.D. Ovarense, 2025
- (United States) Andrew Samuels - 2025 - selected in 2026 MLS SuperDraft by St. Louis City SC (2nd round, 37th overall)
- (El Salvador) Diego Grande - 2015-25 - signed by C.D. FAS, 2026
- (United States) Angel Iñiguez - 2017-24 - signed by Huntsville City FC, 2026
- (United States) Gabriel Bracken Serra - 2023-24 - signed by San Jose Earthquakes II, 2026

=== Women (13) ===
- (Australia) Amy Sayer - 2023 - signed by Kristianstads DFF, 2023
- (Portugal) Nádia Gomes - 2023 - signed by Chicago Red Stars, 2024
- (United States) Miri O'Donnell - 2023 - signed by Sporting Clube de Portugal Femenino, 2024
- (United States) Karlie Lema - 2024 - signed by Bay FC, 2024
- (Philippines) Madison Samilo - 2023 - signed by Stallion Laguna F.C., 2025
- (United States) Carina Lageyre - 2023 - signed by Angel City FC, 2026
- (United States) Andrea Kitahata - 2023-24 - signed by Gotham FC, 2026
- (United States) Jasmine Aikey - 2023 - signed by Denver Summit FC, 2026
- (United States) Yuna McCormack - 2023 - signed by Denver Summit FC, 2026
- (United States) Elise Evans - 2023-24 - signed by Chicago Stars FC, 2026
- (United States) Mia Fontana - 2023-24 - signed by AFC Toronto, 2026
- (United States) Jennie Immethun - 2023-24 - signed by Portland Thorns, 2026
- (United States) Jessie Halladay - 2023-24 - signed by Racing Power FC, 2026

^signed with Glens but did not play in an official game
^^played for SF Glens Academy only
^^^played for SF Glens Academy; signed amateur MLS NEXT Pro contract only

== Club honors ==
USL W League

- Western Conference: 2023
- NorCal Division: 2023

SFSFL

- Premier Division: 1983–84, 1989–90
- Division II: 1978–79, 2001, 2022^
- Division III: 1977–78, 2021^^
- Division IV: 1976–77

^won by SF Glens Third Team
^^won by SF Glens Under-23 Fourth Team

National Amateur Cup

- California North: 1978–79, 1979–80, 1982–83
- National Finalists: 1979, 1990

U.S. Open Cup

- California North: 1977–78, 1979–80, 1980–81

California State Cup

- Champions: 1983–84
- Finalists: 2018

California State Intermediate Cup (1): 1968–69

Carlsberg Cup

- S.F. Champions: 2001
- National Finalists: 2001

SFSFL 120th Anniversary Cup

- Champions: 2022^^^
- Finalists: 2022^^^

^^^SF Glens Under-23 Fourth Team defeated SF Glens Third Team 2-1 in final

== Major individual honors ==
USL W League National Player of the Year

- Nádia Gomes: 2023

USL W League National Team of the Year

- Nádia Gomes: 2023
- Elle Piper: 2023

USL W League National Executive of the Year

- Ryan Maquiñana: 2023

USL W League NorCal Division Player of the Year

- Nádia Gomes: 2023

USL League Two Western Conference Team of the Year

- Nabilai Kibunguchy: 2019
- Kevyn Lo: 2022
- Adrian Guzman: 2025

USL League Two NorCal Division Player of the Year

- Max Chrétien: 2023
- Adrian Guzman: 2025

MLS NEXT All-Star Game Selection

- Kevin Rodriguez: 2022
- Antonio Medina (coach): 2022
