= Robert Moewes =

German footballer

Personal information
- Full name: Robert Cem Moewes
- Date of birth: 27 February 1993 (age 33)
- Place of birth: Dortmund, Germany
- Height: 1.94 m (6 ft 4 in)
- Position: Goalkeeper

Youth career
- 2003–2008: Borussia Dortmund
- → Schalke 04 (loan)

Senior career*
Years	Team	Apps	(Gls)
2008–2013	Borussia Dortmund	0	(0)
2011–2012	→ Rot-Weiss Essen (loan)	1	(0)
2012–2013	→ TuS Ennepetal (loan)		
2013–2016	Binghamton Bearcats	37	(0)
2017	Duke Blue Devils	17	(0)
2017	Westfalia Herne		
2018–2022	Barnechea	68	(0)
- * Club domestic league appearances and goals as of 00:48, 4 July 2024 (UTC)

Robert Cem Moewes (born 27 February 1993) is a German professional footballer who most recently played as a goalkeeper for Chilean club Barnechea.

From 2013 to 2017, he played at United States' university football whereas he was doing his BA in business administration at Binghamton University (2013–2016).

He speaks five languages: German, English, French, Italian and Spanish.

== Club career ==
=== Early career ===
Moewes began his football career at his hometown's club Borussia Dortmund joining there to its youth set-up where he was teammate of players like Mario Götze. Then —into youth system— he was loaned to Schalke 04, being this time teammate of another important German player: the midfielder Julian Draxler.

In mid-2008, Moewes was finally promoted to Dortmund's first-adult team to face the team's 2008–09 season. Nevertheless, he didn't play any games neither in that season nor the next two (2009–10 and 2010–11). In the end of the last of these three seasons, he was loaned to Rot-Weiss Essen from Regionalliga (fourth division) debuting in a 0–0 draw against Idar-Oberstein, which was his only one match in all the 2011–12 tournament.

=== US University football ===
His last loan spell was TuS Ennepetal from German fifth division. He played there during 2012–13 season. After finishing his participation with TuS, he also ended his link with Borussia Dortmund after deciding being released for study in United States at Binghamton University.

During early 2017, he was selected by Toronto FC in the MLS SuperDraft.

=== Barnechea ===
On 18 January 2018, it was reported that Moewes was hired by A.C. Barnechea from Primera B de Chile (second tier) with the goal to replace in the future to Jorge Manduca, Chilean–Argentine first goalkeeper and club's idol. In the Chilean press —specifically La Tercera— was remarked that he became the fifth one German player to play in Chile after footballers like Hans Lamour, Hans Joachim Schellberg y Ralf Berger. In his arrival he also declared that he would like to play in Colo-Colo, Chilean powerhouse club.

He debuted on 28 April 2018 in a 1–0 away victory against Deportes La Serena in La Portada Stadium, where he replaced Miguel Orellana in 60th minute to cover first-choice keeper Jorge Manduca, who was sent off by the referee. That match allowed him to alternate with Manduca until achieve the goalkeeper post, who earned it in mid-season. Likewise, his performances in 2018 Copa Chile knockout stage consecrated his situation.

On 8 September 2018, he and his teammates Claudio Meneses and Cristián Muñoz were praised by La Tercera newspaper for their performance on having reached the Copa Chile semifinals against Primera División de Chile club Audax Italiano (first division). Nevertheless, on 12 October, the team was defeated in the second leg match with the only one goal of Renato Tarifeño, young striker who netted a header score in 78th minute. On the other hand, Barnechea finished Primera B championship in the 9th place.

The 2019 Primera B tournament for him and Barnechea was very positive because of the team's fourth place in the annual table until 2019–20 Chilean protests and its then total value in €3 million. In that season, Moewes was indisputable in the starting lineup. Nevertheless, on 11 January, they were eliminated in the promotion playoffs' quarterfinals against Deportes Copiapó.

Despite their good performance in 2019, the 2020 season for Barnechea was complex by both its bad results —they ended 13th— and due to 2020 COVID-19 pandemic that affected to the Chilean football. Thereby, on 22 February, they began the Primera B tournament with a 4–1 away defeat with San Luis de Quillota at Lucio Fariña Fernández Municipal Stadium (with Moewes as a starter). The next matchday —that is to say, the second week— they were again defeated, now by Santiago Morning for a 1–3 home defeat at Barnechea Municipal Stadium on 2 March. However, the team slightly recovered on 9 March 2020 in a 2–2 home draw against Cobreloa. There, Moewes saved a penalty to Uruguayan player Pablo Caballero Sebastiani, who caused controversy once he rebuked Moewes (as a result of his impotence) whereas the German goalkeeper reacted by shouting his failure in his face. That game against Cobreloa was the last of Barnechea in five and half months when they returned on 31 August and played newly the fifth matchday after drawing 1–1 with Magallanes. Then, on 14 September 2020, he saved his second penalty of the season in a 2–2 home draw with Deportes Valdivia at San Carlos de Apoquindo Stadium when his team was losing 2–0 at 60th minute.

== Style of play ==
Moewes has said that his referent is German international Manuel Neuer and that he admires Claudio Bravo.
