= Andrew Paoli =

American soccer player (born 1999)

Personal information
- Full name: Andrew Riordan Paoli
- Date of birth: January 6, 1999 (age 27)
- Place of birth: Mountain View, California, United States
- Height: 1.72 m (5 ft 8 in)
- Position: Defensive midfielder

Youth career
- –2015: De Anza Force
- 2015–2017: San Jose Earthquakes

College career
Years	Team	Apps	(Gls)
2017–2021	UCLA Bruins	63	(0)

Senior career*
Years	Team	Apps	(Gls)
2019	FC Florida U23	3	(0)
2022	Bay Cities FC	7	(1)
2023	Chattanooga Red Wolves	19	(1)

International career^{‡}
2017	United States U18	3	(1)
- * Club domestic league appearances and goals as of October 15, 2023 ‡ National team caps and goals as of April 28, 2023

Andrew Riordan Paoli (born January 6, 1999) is an American soccer player who plays as a midfielder.

== Career ==
=== Youth, college and amateur ===
Paoli attended Leigh High School in San Jose, California. He played club soccer with De Anza Force and the San Jose Earthquakes academy between 2015 and 2017.

In 2017, Paoli attended the University of California, Los Angeles to play college soccer. Between 2017 and 2021, Paoli made 63 appearances for the Bruins, where he finished with four career assists. In 2017, he played for the Burlingame Dragons before moving to the San Francisco Glens, where he was voted Team MVP the following year in their inaugural USL League Two campaign. In 2019, he spent a single season in the USL League Two with FC Florida U23, making three appearances.

=== Professional ===
In 2022, Paoli played with National Independent Soccer Association side Bay Cities FC, where he made seven appearances and scored a single goal.

On March 15, 2023, Paoli signed with USL League One side Chattanooga Red Wolves ahead of their upcoming season.

== International ==
In 2017, Paoli was part of the United States under-18 side. He helped the team to win the 23rd International Vaclaz Jezej Tournament in the Czech Republic.
