= 2016 West Coast Conference men's soccer season =

- League: NCAA Division I
- Sport: Soccer
- Duration: August, 2016 – November, 2016
- Teams: 10

2017 MLS SuperDraft
- Top draft pick: Joshua Smith, San Francisco
- Picked by: New England Revolution, 75th overall

Regular season
- Season champions: Portland
- Runners-up: Pacific

West Coast Conference men's soccer seasons
- ← 2015 2017 →

2016 West Coast Conference men's soccer standings
	Conf.					Overall
Team	W		L		T	W		L		T
Portland ‡	6	–	1	–	0	12	–	5	–	2
Pacific +	4	–	1	–	2	13	–	4	–	2
Loyola Marymount	4	–	3	–	0	10	–	8	–	0
Saint Mary's	4	–	3	–	0	8	–	8	–	3
San Francisco	3	–	4	–	0	7	–	9	–	0
San Diego	3	–	4	–	0	6	–	9	–	3
Gonzaga	2	–	4	–	1	8	–	8	–	2
Santa Clara	0	–	6	–	1	5	–	10	–	1
‡-Conference champion + - Invited to the NCAA Division I Men's Soccer Championship; As of 21 November 2016; Rankings from NSCAA

The 2016 West Coast Conference men's soccer season is the 29th season of men's varsity soccer in the conference.

The defending champions are the Santa Clara Broncos who won the regular season last year (the conference does not host a tournament).

== Changes from 2015 ==
- None

== Teams ==
=== Stadiums and locations ===
Team	Location	Stadium	Capacity
Gonzaga Bulldogs	Spokane, Washington	Gonzaga Soccer Field	1,500
Loyola Marymount Lions	Los Angeles, California	Sullivan Field	2,000
Portland Pilots	Portland, Oregon	Merlo Field	5,120
Saint Mary's Gaels	Moraga, California	Saint Mary's Stadium	4,500
San Diego Toreros	San Diego, California	Torero Stadium	6,000
San Francisco Dons	San Francisco, California	Negoesco Stadium	3,000
Santa Clara Broncos	Santa Clara, California	Buck Shaw Stadium	10,300

== Regular season ==
=== Rankings ===
==== NSCAA national ====
Legend
Increase in ranking
Decrease in ranking
Not ranked previous week

		Pre	Wk 1	Wk 2	Wk 3	Wk 4	Wk 5	Wk 6	Wk 7	Wk 8	Wk 9	Wk 10	Wk 11	Wk 12	Final
Gonzaga	C			RV	20	NR									
Loyola Marymount	C														
Pacific	C						RV	RV	RV	RV	RV	RV	RV	RV	RV
Portland	C				RV	NR				RV	RV	RV	RV	RV	RV
Saint Mary's	C														
San Diego	C		RV												
San Francisco	C														
Santa Clara	C	RV													

==== NSCAA Far West regional ====
Legend
Increase in ranking
Decrease in ranking
Not ranked previous week

		Wk 1	Wk 2	Wk 3	Wk 4	Wk 5	Wk 6	Wk 7	Wk 8	Wk 9	Wk 10	Wk 11	Wk 12
Gonzaga	C		4	4	9	NR			8	8	10	NR	
Loyola Marymount	C					9	9	6	NR	10	9	10	9
Pacific	C				7	3	5	7	4	5	6	3	5
Portland	C		9	5	NR	7	7	5	3	4	4	5	4
Saint Mary's	C	7	NR									7	8
San Diego	C			9	NR								
San Francisco	C		10	NR									
Santa Clara	C				10	10	8	NR					

=== Results ===
Team/opponent	GON	LMU	POR	SMC	USD	USF	SCU
Gonzaga Bulldogs							
Loyola Marymount Lions							
Portland Pilots							
Saint Mary's Gaels							
San Diego Toreros							
San Francisco Dons							
Santa Clara Broncos							

== Postseason ==
=== NCAA tournament ===
Seed	Region	School	1st round	2nd round	3rd round	Quarterfinals	Semifinals	Championship
—N/a	2	Pacific	W, 1–0 vs. CSUN – (Northridge)	L 0–2 vs. Stanford – (Stanford)				
—N/a	3	Portland	T, 0–0 (L, 5–6 pen.) vs. New Mexico – (Albuquerque)					

== All-WCC awards and teams ==
2016 WCC men's soccer individual awards
Award	Recipient(s)
Player of the Year	Eddie Sanchez, Portland
Defensive Player of the Year	Connor Johnson, Loyola Marymount
Goalkeeper of the Year	Paul Christensen, Portland
Co-Coaches of the Year	Ryan Jorden, Pacific; Nick Carlin-Voigt, Portland
Freshman of the Year	Benji Michel, Portland

2016 WCC men's soccer all-conference teams
First team	Second team	Freshman team
Tristan Blackmon, Jr., DF, PAC; Julio Cervantes, Sr., FW, PAC; Jalen Crisler, Jr., DF, ZAGA; Jakob Granlund, Sr., FW, ZAGA; Connor Johnson, Jr., DF, LMU; Benji Michel, Fr., FW, POR; Kris Reaves, Jr., DF, POR; Eddie Sanchez, Sr., FW, POR; Rafael Sanchez, Sr., MF, SMC; Leon Schwarzer, Jr., MF, USF; Michael Turner, Sr., MF, USD	Valdemar Andersen, Jr., DF, SCU; Ben Braman, Jr., DF, SMC; Brennan Castro, Sr., DF, SCU; Paul Christensen, Jr., GK, POR; David Garrett, Sr., FW, USF; Curtis Goldsmith, Jr., GK, PAC; Aaron Lombardi, Jr., MF, USF; Adrien Perez, Sr., FW, LMU; Josh Smith, Jr., DF, USF; Jakub Svehlik, Fr., MF, SMC; Wouter Verstraaten, So., DF, PAC	Garrett Amador, DF, LMU; Jalani Ambrose, DF, SCU; Davis Behnke, DF, ZAGA; Miguel Berrym FW, USD; Andreas Charalambous, MF, PAC; Gio Magana-Rivera, MF, POR; Benji Michel, FW, POR; Anthony Orendain, FW, PAC; Matt Orr, DF, USF; Jake Rudel, DF, SMC; Jakub Svehlik, MF, SMC

== See also ==
- 2016 NCAA Division I men's soccer season
- 2016 West Coast Conference women's soccer season
