= Pablo Caballero =

Pablo Caballero may refer to:

- Pablo Caballero (footballer, born 1972), Paraguayan football striker and manager
- Pablo Caballero (footballer, born 1986), Argentine football forward for Messina
- Pablo Caballero (footballer, born January 1987), Uruguayan football forward
- Pablo Caballero (footballer, born November 1987), Uruguayan football midfielder for Sud America

== See also ==
- Pablo Cavallero (born 1974), Argentine football goalkeeper
