= 2017 MLS SuperDraft =

College draft for soccer teams

General information
- Sport: Soccer
- Date: January 13, 2017
- Time: 3:00 p.m. ET
- Location: Los Angeles, California
- Network: MLSSoccer.com

Overview
- 81 total selections
- First selection: Abu Danladi

The 2017 MLS SuperDraft was the eighteenth SuperDraft conducted by Major League Soccer. The SuperDraft is held each year in conjunction with the annual National Soccer Coaches Association of America convention. The first two rounds of the 2017 SuperDraft were held in Los Angeles, California on January 13, 2017, as part of the NSCAA 2017 convention. Rounds three and four were held via conference call on January 17, 2017.

== Format ==
The SuperDraft format has remained constant throughout its history and closely resembles that of the NFL draft:

1. Any expansion teams receive the first picks. MLS has announced that Atlanta United FC and Minnesota United FC will begin play in 2017. As determined by a "Priority Draft" conducted on October 16, 2016, Minnesota received the first overall selection and Atlanta picked second.
2. Non-playoff clubs received the next picks in reverse order of prior season finish.
3. Teams that made the MLS Cup Playoffs were then ordered by which round of the playoffs they were eliminated.
4. The winners of the MLS Cup were given the last selection, and the losers the penultimate selection.

== Player selection ==
*	Denotes player who has been selected for an MLS Best XI team

=== Round 1 ===
Any player marked with a * is part of the Generation Adidas program.

Pick #	MLS team	Player	Position	College	PDL or NPSL affiliation	Signed
1	Minnesota United FC	(Ghana) Abu Danladi*	Forward	UCLA	Ventura County Fusion	(United States) Minnesota United FC
2	Atlanta United FC	(United States) Miles Robinson*	Defender	Syracuse	FC Boston	(United States) Atlanta United FC
3	New York City FC (Note: #3: Chicago Fire → New York City FC. January 13, 2017: New York City FC acquired a first-round selection in the 2017 SuperDraft from Chicago Fire in exchange for $250,000 of general allocation money.)	(United States) Jonathan Lewis*	Forward	Akron		(United States) New York City FC
4	Portland Timbers (Note: #4: Houston Dynamo → Portland Timbers. January 13, 2017: Portland Timbers acquired the #4 selection in the 2017 SuperDraft from Houston Dynamo in exchange for the #10 selection in the 2017 SuperDraft, an international roster slot for the 2017 season, and $100,000 in general allocation money.)	(United States) Jeremy Ebobisse*	Forward	Duke	D.C. United U-23	(United States) Portland Timbers
5	Columbus Crew SC	(Ghana) Lalas Abubakar	Defender	Dayton	Michigan Bucks	(United States) Columbus Crew SC
6	San Jose Earthquakes	(United States) Jackson Yueill*	Midfielder	UCLA		(United States) San Jose Earthquakes
7	Vancouver Whitecaps FC	(United States) Jake Nerwinski	Defender	Connecticut		(Canada) Vancouver Whitecaps FC
8	Atlanta United FC (Note: #8: Orlando City → Atlanta United. December 13, 2016: Atlanta United FC acquired a first-round selection in the 2017 SuperDraft from Orlando City SC in exchange for defender Donny Toia.)	(Germany) Julian Gressel	Midfielder	Providence		(United States) Atlanta United FC
9	Columbus Crew SC (Note: #9: New England Revolution → Columbus Crew. May 12, 2016: Columbus Crew SC acquired a first-round selection in the 2017 SuperDraft, a second-round selection in the 2018 MLS SuperDraft, an international roster slot for the 2016 season, general allocation money, and targeted allocation money from New England Revolution in exchange for forward Kei Kamara. The traded draft picks are to be New England's highest selections in those respective rounds. Additionally, Columbus will receive a percentage of any fee received should New England transfer Kamara to a club outside of MLS.)	(Denmark) Niko Hansen	Forward	New Mexico	Seattle Sounders U-23	(United States) Columbus Crew SC
10	Houston Dynamo (Note: #10: Portland Timbers → Houston Dynamo. January 13, 2017: Houston Dynamo acquired the #10 selection in the 2017 SuperDraft, an international roster slot for the 2017 season, and $100,000 in general allocation money from Portland Timbers in exchange for the #4 selection in the 2017 SuperDraft.)	(England) Joe Holland	Midfielder	Hofstra	Ventura County Fusion	(United States) Houston Dynamo
11	Chicago Fire (Note: #11: Philadelphia Union → Chicago Fire. August 3, 2016: Chicago Fire acquired a first-round selection in the 2017 SuperDraft, general allocation money, targeted allocation money, discovery rights to an unnamed player, and the #2 ranking in the MLS Allocation Order from Philadelphia Union in exchange for the #1 ranking in the MLS Allocation Order. Philadelphia used the #1 allocation ranking to acquire midfielder Alejandro Bedoya.)	(United States) Daniel Johnson	Midfielder	Louisville	Portland Timbers U23s	(United States) Chicago Fire
12	D.C. United	(United States) Chris Odoi-Atsem	Defender	Maryland		(United States) D.C. United
13	Real Salt Lake	(United States) Reagan Dunk	Defender	Denver		(United States) Real Salt Lake
14	Sporting Kansas City	(United States) Colton Storm	Defender	North Carolina	Portland Timbers U23s	(United States) Sporting Kansas City
15	Colorado Rapids (Note: #15: LA Galaxy → Colorado Rapids. December 13, 2016: Colorado Rapids acquired a first-round selection in the 2017 SuperDraft and a conditional second-round selection in the 2018 MLS SuperDraft from LA Galaxy in exchange for midfielder Jermaine Jones.)	(United States) Sam Hamilton	Midfielder	Denver		(United States) Colorado Rapids
16	New York City FC (Note: #16: New York City FC → Seattle Sounders FC → New York City FC. January 13, 2017: New York City FC acquired a first-round selection in the 2017 SuperDraft from Seattle Sounders FC in exchange for $75,000 in general allocation money. On January 23, 2015, Seattle had acquired this pick, originally a conditional selection in the 2017 SuperDraft, from New York City in exchange for the MLS rights to midfielder Kwadwo Poku.)	(Canada) Kwame Awuah	Midfielder	Connecticut	Sigma FC	(United States) New York City FC
17	New York Red Bulls	(Bermuda) Zeiko Lewis	Midfielder	Boston College	Real Boston Rams	(United States) New York Red Bulls
18	FC Dallas	(United States) Jacori Hayes	Midfielder	Wake Forest	Portland Timbers U23s	(United States) FC Dallas
19	Montreal Impact	(United States) Nick DePuy	Forward	UC Santa Barbara	Ventura County Fusion	(Canada) Montreal Impact
20	New England Revolution (Note: #20: Colorado Rapids → New England Revolution. March 4, 2016: New England Revolution acquired a first-round selection in the 2017 SuperDraft and general allocation money from Colorado Rapids in exchange for midfielder Jermaine Jones.)	(Canada) Brian Wright	Forward	Vermont	Burlingame Dragons	(United States) New England Revolution
21	Toronto FC	(United States) Brandon Aubrey	Defender	Notre Dame		(Canada) Toronto FC
22	Seattle Sounders FC	(United States) Brian Nana-Sinkam	Defender	Stanford	Burlingame Dragons	(United States) Seattle Sounders FC 2

=== Round 2 ===
Any player marked with a * is part of the Generation Adidas program.

Pick #	MLS team	Player	Position	College	PDL or NPSL affiliation	Signed
23	Minnesota United FC	(United States) Alec Ferrell	Goalkeeper	Wake Forest	Carolina Dynamo	Unsigned
24	Colorado Rapids (Note: #24: Atlanta United → Colorado Rapids. December 11, 2016: Colorado Rapids acquired a second-round selection in the 2017 SuperDraft in exchange for an international roster slot to be used in the 2017 and 2018 seasons.)	(United States) Liam Callahan	Defender	Syracuse	K-W United	(United States) New York Cosmos B
25	Philadelphia Union (Note: #25: Chicago Fire → Minnesota United → Philadelphia Union . January 13, 2017: Philadelphia Union acquired a second-round selection (#25) in the 2017 SuperDraft from Minnesota United FC in exchange for a second-round selection (#42) in the 2017 SuperDraft and $50,000 in 2018 general allocation money. (Note: "MNUFC Coaching Staff 'Over The Moon' Following Club's Historic First MLS SuperDraft" (Press release). Minnesota United FC. January 13, 2017.) On December 23, 2016, Minnesota had acquired a second-round selection in the 2017 SuperDraft, the #3 ranking in the MLS Allocation Order, and general allocation money from Chicago Fire in exchange for the #2 ranking in the MLS Allocation Order. Chicago used its allocation ranking to acquire midfielder Juninho.)	(United States) Marcus Epps	Midfielder	South Florida	Chicago Fire U-23	(United States) Philadelphia Union
26	Chicago Fire (Note: #26: Houston Dynamo → Toronto FC → Chicago Fire. January 13, 2017: Chicago Fire acquired the #26 and #27 selections in the 2017 SuperDraft from Toronto FC in exchange for $75,000 in targeted allocation money. On March 2, 2016, Toronto had acquired a conditional second-round selection in the 2017 SuperDraft from Houston Dynamo in exchange for midfielder Collen Warner.)	(United States) Stefan Cleveland	Goalkeeper	Louisville	Dayton Dutch Lions	(United States) Chicago Fire
27	Chicago Fire (Note: #27: Columbus Crew → Montreal Impact → Toronto FC → Chicago Fire. January 13, 2017: Chicago Fire acquired the #27 and #26 selections in the 2017 SuperDraft from Toronto FC in exchange for $75,000 in targeted allocation money. On July 20, 2016, Toronto had acquired a second-round selection in the 2017 SuperDraft from Montreal Impact in exchange for an international roster slot through the end of the 2016 season. The traded draft pick is to be Montreal's highest second-round selection. On June 20, 2016, Montreal had acquired this second-round selection in the 2017 SuperDraft, general allocation money, and targeted allocation money from Columbus Crew SC in exchange for midfielder Dilly Duka.)	(Spain) Guillermo Delgado	Forward	Delaware	Seattle Sounders U-23	(United States) RGVFC Toros
28	San Jose Earthquakes	(South Africa) Lindo Mfeka	Midfielder	South Florida	Reading United	(United States) San Jose Earthquakes
29	Vancouver Whitecaps FC	(New Zealand) Francis de Vries	Defender	Saint Francis (PA)	Michigan Bucks	(Canada) Whitecaps FC 2
30	Houston Dynamo (Note: #30: Orlando City → Houston Dynamo. July 14, 2015: Houston Dynamo acquired a second-round selection in the 2017 SuperDraft and allocation money from Orlando City SC in exchange for defender Corey Ashe.)	(United States) Jake McGuire	Goalkeeper	Tulsa	Portland Timbers U23s	(United States) Philadelphia Union
31	New England Revolution	(Lesotho) Napo Matsoso	Midfielder	Kentucky	Derby City Rovers	(United States) Louisville City FC
32	Portland Timbers	(United States) Michael Amick	Defender	UCLA	FC Golden State Force	(United States) Portland Timbers 2
33	Philadelphia Union	(England) Aaron Jones	Defender	Clemson	Carolina Dynamo	(United States) Philadelphia Union
34	D.C. United	(United States) Eric Klenofsky	Goalkeeper	Monmouth	New York Red Bulls U-23	(United States) D.C. United
35	Real Salt Lake	(United States) Justin Schmidt	Defender	Washington	Washington Crossfire	(United States) Real Salt Lake
36	Houston Dynamo (Note: #36: Sporting Kansas City → Houston Dynamo. January 7, 2016: Houston Dynamo acquired a second-round selection in the 2017 SuperDraft, a third-round selection in the 2018 MLS SuperDraft, and future considerations from Sporting Kansas City in exchange for midfielder Brad Davis.)	(United States) Danilo Radjen	Defender	Akron	West Virginia Chaos	(United States) New York Cosmos B
37	FC Dallas (Note: #37: LA Galaxy → FC Dallas. December 15, 2015: FC Dallas acquired second-round and third-round selections in the 2017 SuperDraft from LA Galaxy in exchange for goalkeeper Dan Kennedy.)	(United States) Walker Hume	Defender	North Carolina	Portland Timbers U23s	(United States) FC Dallas
38	New York City FC	(United States) Jalen Brown	Forward	Xavier	Des Moines Menace	(United States) Rochester Rhinos
39	New York Red Bulls	(United States) Ethan Kutler	Forward	Colgate	Michigan Bucks	(United States) New York Red Bulls II
40	FC Dallas	(Canada) Adonijah Reid*	Forward		ANB Futbol	(United States) FC Dallas
41	Montreal Impact	(Canada) Shamit Shome*	Midfielder		FC Edmonton	(Canada) Montreal Impact
42	Minnesota United FC (Note: #42: Colorado Rapids → Philadelphia Union → Minnesota United. January 13, 2017: Minnesota United FC acquired a second-round selection (#42) in the 2017 SuperDraft and $50,000 in 2018 general allocation money from Philadelphia Union in exchange for a second-round selection (#25) in the 2017 SuperDraft. On December 11, 2015, Philadelphia had acquired a second-round selection in the 2017 SuperDraft from Colorado Rapids in exchange for goalkeeper Zac MacMath.)	(France) Thomas de Villardi	Defender	Delaware	New York Red Bulls U-23	(United States) Minnesota United FC
43	D.C. United (Note: #43: Toronto FC → Portland Timbers → D.C. United. December 12, 2016: D.C. United acquired a second-round selection in the 2017 SuperDraft from Portland Timbers in exchange for the rights to Kennedy Igboananike and an international roster slot. On December 18, 2015, Portland had acquired this pick, originally a conditional second-round selection, and targeted allocation money from Toronto FC in exchange for midfielder Will Johnson.)	(Norway) Jo Vetle Rimstad	Defender	Radford		(Norway) Gran IL
44	Seattle Sounders FC	(Ghana) Dominic Oduro	Defender		FC Nordsjælland	(United States) FC Golden State Force

=== Round 3 ===
Any player marked with a * is part of the Generation Adidas program.

Pick #	MLS team	Player	Position	College	PDL or NPSL affiliation	Signed
45	Colorado Rapids (Note: #45: Minnesota United → Colorado Rapids. December 11, 2016: Colorado Rapids acquired a third-round selection in the 2017 SuperDraft from Minnesota United FC in exchange for defender Joseph Greenspan.)	(Jordan) Jaime Siaj	Forward	Pfeiffer	Charlotte Eagles	(United States) Charlotte Independence
46	Atlanta United FC	(United States) Andrew Wheeler-Omiunu	Midfielder	Harvard	Seattle Sounders FC U-23	(United States) Atlanta United FC
47	Chicago Fire	(United States) Brandt Bronico	Midfielder	Charlotte	Carolina Dynamo	(United States) Chicago Fire
48	Real Salt Lake (Note: #48: Houston Dynamo → Real Salt Lake. February 18, 2016: Real Salt Lake acquired a conditional third-round selection in the 2017 SuperDraft from Houston Dynamo in exchange for defender Abdoulie Mansally.)	(United States) Andrew Putna	Goalkeeper	UIC	Chicago Fire U-23	(United States) Real Monarchs
49	Columbus Crew SC	(United States) Connor Maloney	Defender	Penn State	Reading United	(United States) Columbus Crew SC
50	San Jose Earthquakes	(United States) Christian Thierjung	Forward	California	Burlingame Dragons	(United States) New York Cosmos B
51	Vancouver Whitecaps FC	(Spain) Jorge Gómez	Midfielder	Temple		(Spain) Puerta Bonita
52	Toronto FC (Note: #52: Orlando City → Toronto FC. December 21, 2015: Toronto FC acquired this pick, originally a conditional fourth-round selection in the 2017 SuperDraft, from Orlando City SC in exchange for goalkeeper Joe Bendik. This became a third-round selection when Bendik started 75% of Orlando's games in the 2016 MLS season.)	(Germany) Robert Moewes	Goalkeeper	Duke	IMG Academy Bradenton	(Germany) SC Westfalia Herne
53	FC Dallas (Note: #53: New England Revolution → FC Dallas. March 4, 2016: FC Dallas acquired a third-round selection in the 2017 SuperDraft from New England Revolution in exchange for defender Je-Vaughn Watson.)	(United States) Austin Ledbetter	Defender	SIU Edwardsville	Des Moines Menace	(United States) Saint Louis FC
54	New York City FC (Note: #54: Portland Timbers → New York City FC. August 2, 2016: New York City FC acquired a conditional third-round selection in the 2017 SuperDraft and targeted allocation money from Portland Timbers in exchange for the MLS rights to defender Gbenga Arokoyo.)	(Norway) Chris Wingate	Midfielder	New Hampshire	Seattle Sounders U-23	(United States) Bethlehem Steel
55	Philadelphia Union	(Canada) Chris Nanco	Forward	Syracuse	Sigma FC	(United States) Bethlehem Steel
56	Seattle Sounders FC (Note: #56: D.C. United → Seattle Sounders FC. August 7, 2014: Seattle Sounders FC acquired a third-round selection in the 2017 SuperDraft from D.C. United in exchange for midfielder David Estrada.)	(United States) Bakie Goodman	Midfielder	Georgetown	IMG Academy Bradenton	(United States) Detroit City FC
57	Real Salt Lake	PASS				
58	Sporting Kansas City	(United States) David Greczek	Goalkeeper	Rutgers	Jersey Express	(United States) Swope Park Rangers
59	FC Dallas (Note: #59: LA Galaxy → FC Dallas. December 15, 2015: FC Dallas acquired third-round and second-round selections in the 2017 SuperDraft from LA Galaxy in exchange for goalkeeper Dan Kennedy.)	(United States) Dakota Barnathan	Midfielder	VCU	Portland Timbers U23s	(United States) Swope Park Rangers
60	New York City FC	(United States) Michael DeGraffenriedt	Defender	Louisville	Baltimore Bohemians	(United States) Nashville SC
61	New York Red Bulls	(Jamaica) Jordan Scarlett	Defender	Iona	Lehigh Valley United	(United States) New York Red Bulls II
62	FC Dallas	(Cape Verde) Wuilito Fernandes	Forward	UMass Lowell		(United States) Orange County SC
63	Montreal Impact	PASS				
64	Orlando City SC (Note: #64: Colorado Rapids → D.C. United → New York Red Bulls → Orlando City. April 29, 2016: Orlando City SC acquired this pick, originally a conditional fourth-round selection in the 2017 SuperDraft, from New York Red Bulls in exchange for defender Aurélien Collin. On February 15, 2016, New York had acquired this pick, originally a conditional selection in the 2017 SuperDraft, from D.C. United in exchange for the MLS rights to midfielder Luciano Acosta. On February 9, 2016, D.C. United had acquired a third-round selection in the 2017 SuperDraft from Colorado Rapids in exchange for forward Conor Doyle.)	(England) Danny Deakin	Midfielder	South Carolina	Detroit City FC	(United States) Orlando City SC
65	Toronto FC	(Norway) Øyvind Alseth	Midfielder	Syracuse	K-W United	(Canada) Toronto FC
66	Seattle Sounders FC	(United States) Jake Stovall	Defender	Wright State	Cincinnati Dutch Lions	Puerto Rico FC

=== Round 4 ===
Any player marked with a * is part of the Generation Adidas program.

Pick #	MLS team	Player	Position	College	PDL or NPSL affiliation	Signed
67	Minnesota United FC	(United States) Tanner Thompson	Midfielder	Indiana		(United States) Indy Eleven
68	Atlanta United FC	(United States) Alex Kapp	Goalkeeper	Creighton		(United States) Minnesota United FC
69	Chicago Fire	(Croatia) Matej Dekovic	Defender	Charlotte		(United States) Chicago Fire
70	Houston Dynamo	(United States) Robby Sagel	Defender	Penn State	Reading United	(United States) RGVFC Toros
71	Columbus Crew SC	(United States) Logan Ketterer	Goalkeeper	Bradley	Ocean City Nor'easters	(United States) Columbus Crew SC
72	San Jose Earthquakes	(United States) Auden Schilder	Goalkeeper	Washington	Washington Crossfire	Unsigned
73	Vancouver Whitecaps FC	(South Africa) Nazeem Bartman	Forward	South Florida	Michigan Bucks	(Canada) Whitecaps FC 2
74	Real Salt Lake (Note: #74: Orlando City → Real Salt Lake. January 22, 2014, Real Salt Lake acquired a fourth-round selection in the 2017 SuperDraft from Orlando City SC in exchange for midfielder Yordany Álvarez.)	PASS				
75	New England Revolution	(United States) Joshua Smith	Defender	San Francisco	Burlingame Dragons	(United States) New England Revolution
76	Portland Timbers	(United States) Russell Cicerone	Midfielder	Buffalo	Michigan Bucks	(United States) Portland Timbers 2
77	Philadelphia Union	(England) Jack Elliott	Defender	West Virginia	South Florida Surf	(United States) Philadelphia Union
78	D.C. United	PASS				
79	Real Salt Lake	PASS				
80	Portland Timbers (Note: #80: Sporting Kansas City → Portland Timbers. January 9, 2017: Portland Timbers acquired a fourth-round selection in the 2017 SuperDraft from Sporting Kansas City in exchange for forward Christian Volesky.)	(El Salvador) Romilio Hernandez	Midfielder	Louisville	Portland Timbers U23s	(United States) Phoenix Rising
81	LA Galaxy	PASS				
82	Philadelphia Union (Note: #82: New York City FC → Philadelphia Union. December 10, 2015: Philadelphia Union acquired a fourth-round selection in the 2017 SuperDraft from New York City FC in exchange for defender Ethan White.)	(Spain) Santi Moar	Forward	Pfeiffer	Charlotte Eagles	(United States) Bethlehem Steel
83	Toronto FC (Note: #83: New York Red Bulls → Toronto FC. January 27, 2014: Toronto FC acquired a fourth-round selection in the 2017 SuperDraft from New York Red Bulls in exchange for defender Richard Eckersley.)	(United States) Lars Eckenrode	Defender	Michigan	D.C. United U-23	(Canada) Toronto FC II
84	FC Dallas	(United States) Marco Carrizales	Midfielder	Furman		Unsigned
85	Montreal Impact	PASS				
86	Colorado Rapids	(Cameroon) Peguy Ngatcha	Forward	Wright State		(United States) Cincinnati Dutch Lions
87	Toronto FC	(United States) Juan Pablo Saavedra	Defender	Virginia Tech		Unsigned
88	Seattle Sounders FC	(United States) Kyle Bjornethun	Defender	Seattle	Seattle Sounders FC U-23	(United States) Portland Timbers 2

=== Other 2017 SuperDraft Trade Notes ===
- On January 18, 2016, Colorado Rapids acquired a conditional first-round selection in the 2017 SuperDraft, a third-round selection in the 2016 MLS SuperDraft, and targeted allocation money from Toronto FC in exchange for goalkeeper Clint Irwin. Through January 5, 2017, the MLSSoccer.com 2017 SuperDraft page stated that Colorado had acquired the first-round pick from Toronto. Effective January 6, 2017, the MLSSoccer.com website stated that Toronto maintained this pick. No explanation was provided for the change.
- On May 4, 2016, Columbus Crew SC acquired a second-round selection in the 2017 SuperDraft from Chicago Fire in exchange for the MLS rights to midfielder Khaly Thiam. However, trade terms stated that should Thiam start 12 or more MLS regular-season games in 2016 the SuperDraft pick would be converted to General Allocation Money. Thiam met this threshold and Columbus received General Allocation Money.

== Notable undrafted players ==
=== Homegrown players ===
Original MLS team	Player	Position	College	Conference	Notes
Colorado Rapids	Kortne Ford	Defender	Denver	Summit	
Colorado Rapids	Ricardo Perez	Midfielder	Creighton	Big East	
Columbus Crew	Alex Crognale	Defender	Maryland	Big Ten	
D.C. United	Ian Harkes	Midfielder	Wake Forest	ACC	2016 Hermann Trophy winner
FC Dallas	Reggie Cannon	Defender	UCLA	Pac-12	
New York Red Bulls	Arun Basuljevic	Midfielder	Georgetown	Big East	
New York Red Bulls	Evan Louro	Goalkeeper	Michigan	Big Ten	
Real Salt Lake	José Hernández	Midfielder	UCLA	Pac-12	2016 Pac-12 Player of the Year
San Jose Earthquakes	Nick Lima	Defender	California	Pac-12	
Seattle Sounders FC	Seyi Adekoya	Forward	UCLA	Pac-12	
Seattle Sounders FC	Henry Wingo	Midfielder	Washington	Pac-12	
Toronto FC	Sergio Camargo	Midfielder	Syracuse	ACC	

=== Players who signed outside of MLS ===
Player	Position	College	Conference	Team	League	Notes
Sam Brotherton	Defender	Wisconsin	Big Ten	Sunderland	Premier League	

== Summary ==
=== Selections by college athletic conference ===
Conference	Round 1	Round 2	Round 3	Round 4	Total
NCAA Division I conferences
America East	1	0	2	0	3
The American	2	3	1	1	7
ACC	7	5	4	2	18
Atlantic 10	1	0	1	0	2
Big East	3	1	1	1	6
Big South	0	1	0	0	1
Big Ten	1	0	2	3	6
West Coast	1	0	0	0	1
CAA	1	2	0	0	3
Conference USA	1	1	2	1	5
Horizon	0	0	2	1	3
Ivy	0	0	1	0	1
Mid-American	1	1	0	2	4
MAAC	0	1	1	0	2
MVC	0	0	1	1	2
Northeast	0	1	0	0	1
Pac-12	3	2	1	1	7
Patriot	0	1	0	0	1
SoCon	0	0	0	1	1
Summit	2	0	0	0	2
WAC	0	0	0	1	1
West Coast	0	0	0	1	1
Non-Division I conferences
Conference Carolinas	0	0	1	1	2
Non-NCAA
Non-College Selections
Danish Superliga	0	1	0	0	1
L10	0	1	0	0	1
NASL	0	1	0	0	1
Pass	0	0	2	4	6

=== Schools with multiple draft selections ===
Selections	Schools
4	Louisville, Syracuse
3	UCLA, South Florida
2	Akron, Connecticut, Delaware, Denver, Duke, Penn State, Pfeiffer, Wake Forest, Washington, Wright State
