= Miri O'Donnell =

American soccer player (born 2006)

Personal information
- Full name: Miri Angel O'Donnell
- Date of birth: August 1, 2006 (age 20)
- Place of birth: Japan
- Height: 5 ft 5 in (1.65 m)
- Position: Forward

Team information
- Current team: Sporting CP
- Number: 78

Youth career
- 2022–2024: FC Bay Area Surf
- 2024: MVLA

Senior career*
Years	Team	Apps	(Gls)
2023	San Francisco Glens	4	(4)
2024–	Sporting CP	16	(3)

International career^{‡}
2023	United States U-17		
2023–2025	United States U-19		
- * Club domestic league appearances and goals as of September 18, 2026 ‡ National team caps and goals as of June 3, 2024

Miri Angel O'Donnell (born August 1, 2006) is an American professional soccer player who plays as a forward for Campeonato Nacional Feminino club Sporting CP.

== Early life ==
O'Donnell, who is of partial Japanese descent, was born in Japan while her father was stationed there with the United States Armed Forces. She began playing soccer at age four, following her older siblings into the sport. Moving frequently due to her father's job, the family eventually settled in San Ramon, California, where she attended Dougherty Valley High School. She played club soccer there for Mustang FC, FC Bay Area Surf, and MVLA Soccer Club. She tore the anterior cruciate ligament (ACL) in her right knee when she was 15 years old. She also played USL W League soccer for the San Francisco Glens. Before going pro, she committed to play college soccer for Wake Forest during her senior year.

== Club career ==
Portuguese club Sporting CP announced on August 14, 2024, that they had signed O'Donnell to her first professional contract on a three-year deal. She made her professional debut on October 13, coming on as a late substitute in a 1–0 league win over Damaiense. On November 16, she made her first start and scored her first professional goal to conclude a 8–0 rout against Albergaria. She finished her debut season with 3 goals from 20 appearances in all competitions as Sporting were league runners-up to Benfica. The season ended sourly, however, when she suffered a partial ACL tear in her left knee during the league finale against Marítimo on May 11, 2025.

O'Donnell resumed training after more than a year away. On September 18, 2026, nearly 500 days after her ACL injury, she made her return off the bench against Marítimo.

== International career ==
O'Donnell was an alternate for the United States under-19 squad that won bronze at the 2023 Pan American Games.

== Honors ==
Sporting CP

- Supertaça de Portugal Feminina: 2024
