= Robby Sagel =

American soccer player

Personal information
- Full name: Robert Spencer Sagel
- Date of birth: February 11, 1995 (age 31)
- Place of birth: Las Vegas, Nevada, United States
- Height: 1.90 m (6 ft 3 in)
- Position: Defender

College career
Years	Team	Apps	(Gls)
2013–2014	Temple Owls	36	(3)
2015–2016	Penn State Nittany Lions	32	(2)

Senior career*
Years	Team	Apps	(Gls)
2014–2015	Reading United	10	(1)
2016	Lehigh Valley United	6	(0)
2016	Reading United	2	(0)
2017	Rio Grande Valley FC	12	(0)
- * Club domestic league appearances and goals as of 16:44, 21 October 2017 (UTC)

Robert "Robby" Spencer Sagel (born February 11, 1995) is an American soccer player.

== Career ==
=== Amateur & College ===
Sagel spent four years playing college soccer. Two years at Temple University, before transferring to Penn State University in 2015.

Sagel also appeared for USL PDL sides Reading United and Lehigh Valley United.

=== Professional ===
On January 17, 2017, Sagel was selected in the fourth round, 70th overall, of the 2017 MLS SuperDraft by Houston Dynamo.

Sagel signed with United Soccer League side Rio Grande Valley FC in March 2017.
