= Nabilai Kibunguchy =

Kenyan footballer (born 1998)

Personal information
- Full name: Nabilai Absolom Kibunguchy
- Date of birth: 5 January 1998 (age 28)
- Place of birth: Elk Grove, California, U.S.
- Height: 1.91 m (6 ft 3 in)
- Position: Centre-back

Team information
- Current team: Indy Eleven
- Number: 36

Youth career
- 2015–2016: Sacramento Republic

College career
Years	Team	Apps	(Gls)
2016–2019	UC Davis Aggies	52	(3)

Senior career*
Years	Team	Apps	(Gls)
2019	San Francisco Glens	11	(0)
2021–2022	Minnesota United	2	(0)
2021	→ Sacramento Republic (loan)	16	(1)
2022	Minnesota United 2	16	(4)
2023–2024	Orlando City B	53	(4)
2025-2026	Hougang United	24	(3)
2026–	Indy Eleven	14	(0)

International career^{‡}
2016	United States U19	2	(0)
2023–	Kenya	1	(0)
- * Club domestic league appearances and goals as of 7 November 2026 ‡ National team caps and goals as of 8 November 2021

Nabilai Absolom Kibunguchy (born 5 January 1998), better known as just Nabi, is a professional footballer who plays primarily as a centre-back for Indy Eleven in the USL Championship. Primarily a centre-back, he is also capable of playing either as a right-back, defensive-midfielder and occasionally as a striker. Born in the United States, he has represented the Kenya national team.

== College career ==
=== Youth ===
Kibunguchy was born and raised in Elk Grove, California. He was part of the Sacramento Republic from 2015 to 2016, where he made 30 appearances and scored a single goal.

=== College ===
Kibunguchy played college soccer at the University of California, Davis from 2016 to 2019. During his time with the Aggies, Kibunguchy made 52 appearances, scoring 3 goals and tallying 2 assists. Kibunguchy redshirted his freshman season following a season-ending injury and the Big West Conference was cancelled in 2020 due to the COVID-19 pandemic. During his college career, Kibunguchy was named All-Big West Conference First Team, Big West All-Freshman Team and Big West Conference All-Academic Team in 2017, and United Soccer Coaches All-Far West Region Second Team and All-Big West Conference First Team in 2019.

== Club career ==
In 2019, Kibunguchy appeared in the USL League Two with San Francisco Glens, where he earned a spot on the Western Conference All-Star Team.

On 21 January 2021, Kibunguchy was selected 18th overall in 2021 MLS SuperDraft by Minnesota United. He officially signed with the team on 3 April. On 27 May, Kibunguchy moved on loan to USL Championship side Sacramento Republic for the remainder of the 2021 season.

Following the 2022 season, his contract option was declined by Minnesota. Kibunguchy subsequently signed with Orlando City B in MLS Next Pro for the 2023 season. At the end of the 2024 season, Kibunguchy was not included in the 2025 roster.

=== Hougang United ===
On 31 August 2025, Kibunguchy signed with Singapore Premier League club Hougang United. He made his debut for the club on 19 September against Geylang International. On 22 November, he scored his first goal for the cheetahs in a 3–0 win against rivals Geylang International in the Singapore Cup 2025 group stage .

=== Indy Eleven ===
On 14 July 2026, Kibunguchy signed with Indy Eleven of the USL Championship.

== International career ==
Born in the United States, both of Kibunguchy's parents are from Kenya. He is a former youth international for the United States, having played for the United States U19s in 2016.

Kibunguchy was called up to the Kenya national team for a set of 2026 FIFA World Cup qualification matches in November 2023 where he make his debut on 20 November against Seychelles.
