= San Jose Earthquakes U23 =

Soccer team

San Jose Earthquakes
- Full name: San Jose Earthquakes U-23
- Nickname: Quakes
- Founded: 2013
- Dissolved: 2014
- Stadium: Warrior Stadium, Turlock, California
- Owner: Earthquakes Soccer, LLC
- Manager: Dana Taylor
- League: USL Premier Development League
- 2014: 3rd Southwest Division; Playoffs: DNQ
Home colors	Away colors

The San Jose Earthquakes U23, were an American soccer team based in Turlock, California. They were the development team for the MLS San Jose Earthquakes. The team played in the USL Premier Development League (PDL), the fourth tier of the American Soccer Pyramid, in the Southwest Division of the Western Conference.

In their only season in 2014, the U23 Earthquakes finished with 7 wins, 4 losses and 3 ties. They were 6–0–1 in their last seven games, but just missed the playoffs. Defender Ramon Martin Del Campo was named to the All-League and All-Conference teams.

On December 9, 2014, the parent club announced that the new Burlingame Dragons FC would be the Earthquakes official PDL affiliate starting in 2015, replacing the U23 team.

== Year-by-year ==
Year	Division	League	Regular season	Playoffs	Open Cup
2014	4	USL PDL	3rd, Southwest	Did not qualify	Did not qualify
