= Casa Sanchez Foods =

American Mexican-style food snack company

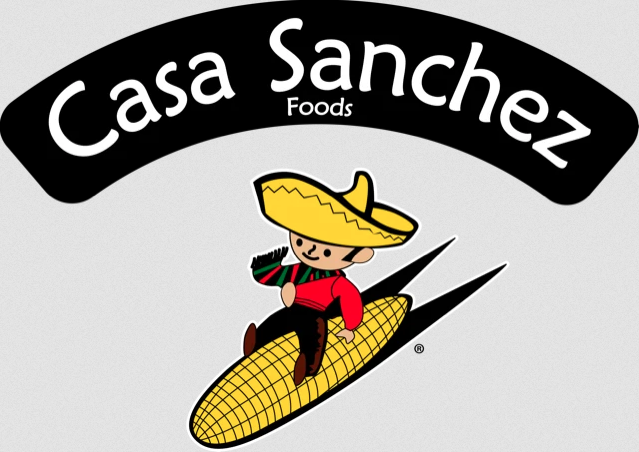

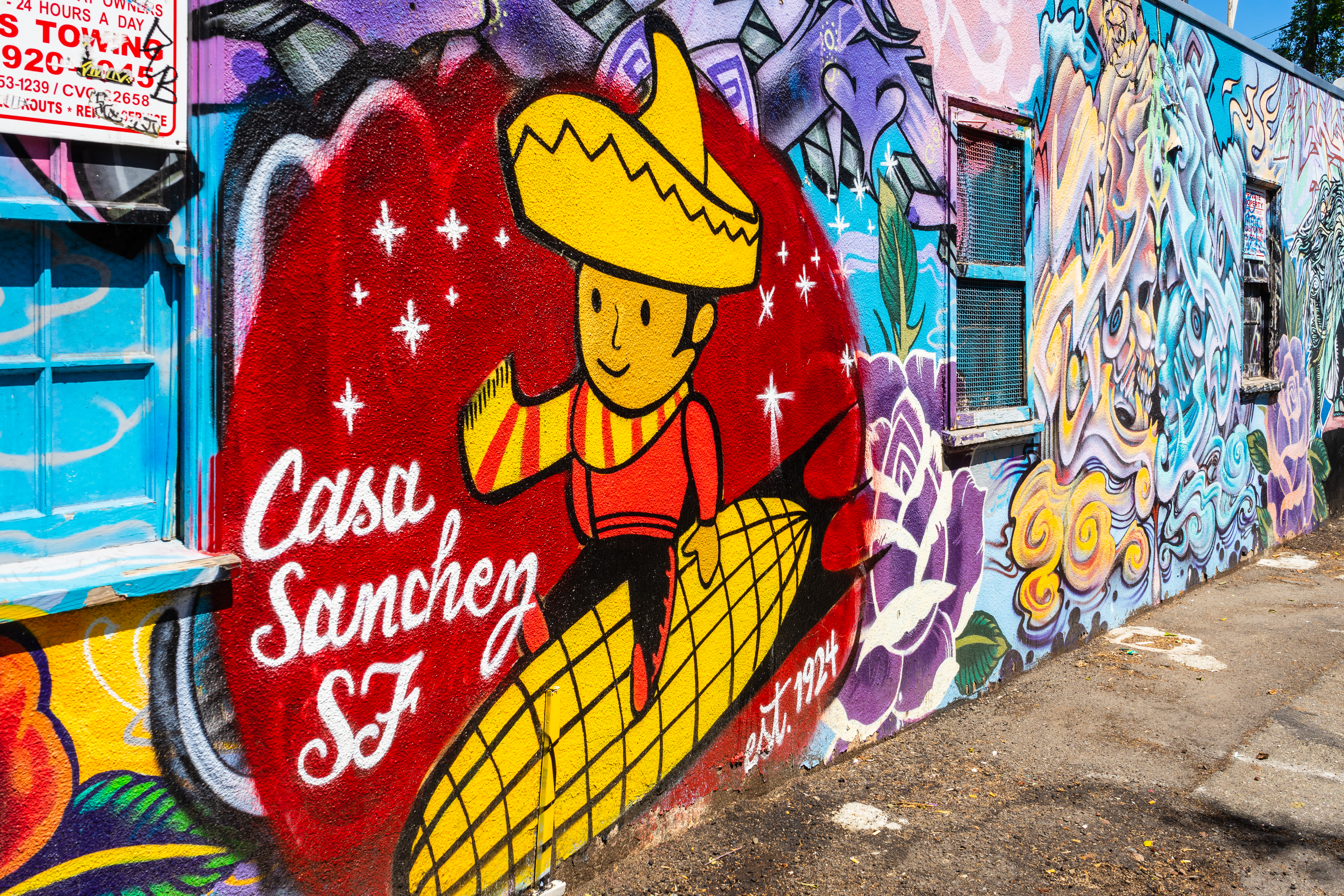
- Casa Sanchez
- Company type: Private
- Industry: Food
- Predecessor: R. Sanchez & Co.
- Founded: 1924; 102 years ago in San Francisco, California
- Founder: Robert Sanchez, Sr.
- Headquarters: Hayward, California, U.S.
- Key people: Robert C. Sanchez
- Products: Mexican-style sauces and tortilla chips
- Owner: Robert C Sanchez
- Website: CasaSanchezfoods.com

Casa Sanchez Foods is an American Mexican-style food snack company, based in the San Francisco Bay Area, best known for producing authentic salsas and tortilla chips. Beginning in the 1920s as a tortilla manufacturer in San Francisco, the company soon evolved to producing salsas, guacamoles, tamales, pupusas, and coffee beans.

The Casa Sanchez Building at 2778 24th Street in the Mission District has been listed as a San Francisco Designated Landmark (no. 296) by the city since February 11, 2022.

== Corporate history ==
=== R. Sanchez & Co. ===
Roberto and Isabel Sanchez immigrated from Zacatecas, Mexico to San Francisco, California, in 1923 and established R. Sanchez & Co., a tortilla factory in Northern California. Tortillas were traditionally sold by the pound and wrapped in paper and string just like in Mexico. After Roberto's death, his widow and three young children took over the family business.

R. Sanchez & Co. began in the Fillmore district of San Francisco, a predominantly Hispanic area at the time. In 1968, the company moved to the Mission district as the Mission was experiencing an influx of Latino residents. Soon after, Robert Jr. and Martha Sanchez decided to manufacture fresh-packaged salsas to differentiate themselves from the many competing tortilla factories.

=== The Cornman ===
Casa Sanchez is one of the highest-selling salsas in California based on Neilson reports and is widely known as a San Francisco staple. The company's logo, "The Cornman", a cartoon depiction of a boy wearing a sombrero while riding an ear of corn like a rocket, was inspired by the landing of the first man on the moon, hence the company's slogan: "flavor out of this world".

=== Casa Sanchez ===
As of today, the company continues to be family operated into the fourth generation—contributing to the further development of the brand's legacy. Casa Sanchez has continued to develop an extensive line of over a dozen Mexican food products and have expanded to the entire west coast as a leader in co-marketing fresh salsas and tortilla chips. Aside from being heavily involved in the community by regularly sponsoring Latino events throughout the Bay Area, Casa Sanchez has also contributed over $100,000 to charity.

In 1999 Casa Sanchez attracted national attention, including that of Forbes magazine, when it unveiled its new marketing campaign: get a tattoo of "The Cornman" and get free lunch at the Casa Sanchez restaurant for life. The promotion returned in March 2010 to much praise. The restaurant closed in 2012.
