= Joshua Smith (soccer) =

American soccer player

Personal information
- Date of birth: March 10, 1992 (age 34)
- Place of birth: Fort Polk, Louisiana, United States
- Height: 1.92 m (6 ft 4 in)
- Position: Centre back

Youth career
- 1. FC Kaiserslautern
- 2009–2011: Karlsruher SC

College career
Years	Team	Apps	(Gls)
2013–2016	San Francisco Dons	71	(5)

Senior career*
Years	Team	Apps	(Gls)
2011–2012	SC Idar-Oberstein	11	(0)
2014	San Jose Earthquakes U23	11	(2)
2015–2016	Burlingame Dragons	23	(1)
2017	New England Revolution	6	(0)
2018–2019	SC Hessen Dreieich	0	(0)
2019	Finn Harps	5	(1)
2020	Galway United	2	(0)

International career
2009	United States U17	1	(0)
- * Club domestic league appearances and goals as of 16:21, 14 November 2020 (UTC)

Joshua Smith (born March 10, 1992) is a retired American soccer player who most recently played for Irish club Galway United in the League of Ireland First Division.

== Career ==
After spending time with SC Idar-Oberstein in 2011 and 2012, Smith returned to the United States to play college soccer at the University of San Francisco between 2013 and 2016. While at San Francisco, Smith made 71 appearances and scored 5 goals.

While at San Francisco, Smith appeared for USL PDL sides San Jose Earthquakes U23 and Burlingame Dragons.

=== Professional ===
On January 17, 2017, Smith was selected in the fourth round (75th overall) of the 2017 MLS SuperDraft by New England Revolution. He signed with the club on March 1, 2017. He was released on November 27, 2017.

Smith officially signed for SC Hessen Dreieich in Germany on 12 February 2018.

After leaving Germany, Smith signed for Finn Harps in the League of Ireland Premier Division in July 2019, scoring his first goal for the club in a 1–0 win over Waterford in October.

On 17 December 2019, Smith signed for League of Ireland First Division side Galway United for their 2020 season. That season the league was delayed as a result of the COVID-19 pandemic, Smith did not reappear with Galway United after the league restarted in July.
