= Jorge Manduca =

Argentine footballer

Personal information
- Full name: Jorge Ignacio Manduca Aglieri
- Date of birth: 27 October 1979 (age 47)
- Place of birth: Santa Fe, Argentina
- Height: 1.85 m (6 ft 1 in)
- Position: Goalkeeper

Youth career
- Boca Juniors
- Unión Santa Fe

Senior career*
Years	Team	Apps	(Gls)
2002–2003	Unión Santa Fe	9	(0)
2004–2005	Sarmiento Junín	1	(0)
2005	Mitre SdE	7	(0)
2006	Centenario	12	(1)
2008–2009	San Marcos	69	(0)
2010	Deportes Copiapó	22	(0)
2011	Coquimbo Unido	26	(1)
2012–2018	Barnechea	192	(0)
2021–2022	Ciudad de Nieva	6	(0)
- * Club domestic league appearances and goals

Jorge Ignacio Manduca Aglieri (born 27 October 1979) is an Argentine retired footballer as goalkeeper.

== Teams ==
- (Argentina) Unión de Santa Fe 2002–2003
- (Argentina) Sarmiento de Junín 2004–2005
- (Argentina) Mitre 2005
- (Argentina) Centenario 2006
- (Chile) San Marcos de Arica 2008–2009
- (Chile) Deportes Copiapó 2010
- (Chile) Coquimbo Unido 2011
- (Chile) Barnechea 2012–2018
- (Argentina) Ciudad de Nieva 2021–2022

== Post-retirement ==
Manduca married a Chilean and settled in Quilicura, Santiago de Chile. He started a transport services company for passengers.
