= Burlingame Dragons FC =

- Full name: Burlingame Dragons Football Club
- Founded: 2014; 11 years ago
- Dissolved: 2017
- Stadium: Burlingame High School; Burlingame, California
- Capacity: 4,000
- Owners: David Ebersman; Nick Swinmurn
- Head Coach: Joe Cannon
- League: Premier Development League
- 2017: 5th, Southwest Division; Playoffs: DNQ
- Website: http://www.burlingamedragons.com/
Home colors	Away colors

Burlingame Dragons FC was an American soccer club based in Burlingame, California. Founded in 2014, the team played in the Premier Development League (PDL). The team was owned by Nick Swinmurn, founder of Zappos.com and a minority investor in the NBA's Golden State Warriors, and David Ebersman, former CFO of Facebook and Genentech. The team played its home games at Burlingame High School stadium. They were the developmental affiliate of the San Jose Earthquakes of Major League Soccer.

== History ==
Burlingame Dragons FC (BDFC) signed an affiliation agreement with the San Jose Earthquakes of Major League Soccer to be their official U23 team on December 9, 2014. The Dragons replaced the San Jose Earthquakes U23 squad that played in the PDL in 2014. Dana Taylor, former Earthquakes U23 and Cal State Stanislaus coach, was hired as the Dragons first head coach on January 27, 2015.

Burlingame Dragons FC's inaugural season in the PDL was capped by its first ever division title, a playoff win and an appearance in the Western Conference Final Four.

In their debut season, the Dragons started strong with wins over the Fresno Fuego and the Golden State Misioneros. On May 29, they suffered their only loss of the season with a 3–0 loss to Ventura County; however, they finished the season strong going 8–0–2 to take the Southwest Division title. In the Western Conference championships, they avenged their only loss by defeating the Fusion in the first round (1–0) but then lost in the semi-finals to the Seattle Sounders FC U-23 1–0.

The Dragons also played in the 2015 Lamar Hunt U.S. Open Cup by inheriting the spot earned by the San Jose Earthquakes U23 team. They lost in overtime 2–1 to Sonoma County Sol in the first round.

The following season, Eric Bucchere replaced Taylor as head coach in 2016. After the Dragons advanced to the Western Conference semi-finals for the second consecutive year, Bucchere was promoted to an assistant coaching position with Reno 1868 FC of the United Soccer League (USL). Bucchere was then replaced by Joe Cannon.

In 2017, the Dragons won their first Open Cup game over El Farolito and even led future NASL champion San Francisco Deltas in the second round before falling 2–1. Matt Wiesenfarth finished second in the entire PDL with 13 goals in just 11 games, and the Dragons were the only team all season that the eventual Western Conference champion FC Golden State Force failed to defeat in two tries (0–0, 1–1).

Founder Nick Swinmurn had made a bid to obtain a USL team following the 2017 season but ultimately withdrew it. At the same time, he announced he would also cease operations of the Dragons.

== Year-by-year ==
Year	Division	League	Regular season	Playoffs	Open Cup	Avg. attendance
2015	4	PDL	1st, Southwest	Conference Semi-finals	1st round	1,700
2016	4	PDL	2nd, Central Pacific	Conference Semi-finals	1st round	2,357
2017	4	PDL	5th, Southwest	Did not qualify	2nd round	—

== Honors ==
Premier Development League

- Southwest Division champions: 2015

== Head coaches ==
- (United States) Dana Taylor (2015)
- (United States) Eric Bucchere (2016)
- (United States) Joe Cannon (2017)

== Players signed/drafted by Major League Soccer clubs ==
- (United States) Ty Thompson (2016, San Jose Earthquakes) ^
- (United States) Josh Cohen (2016, Orange County SC)
- (United States) Nick Lima (2017, San Jose Earthquakes) ‡
- (United States) Brian Nana-Sinkam (2017, Seattle Sounders FC) ^
- (United States) Josh Smith (2017, New England Revolution) ^
- (United States) Christian Thierjung (2017, San Jose Earthquakes) ^
- (Canada) Brian Wright (2017, New England Revolution) ^
- (United States) Tristan Blackmon (2018, LAFC) ^
- (United States) Corey Baird (2018, Real Salt Lake) ‡
- (United States) Tomas Hilliard-Arce (2018, LA Galaxy) ^
- (United States) JT Marcinkowski (2018, San Jose Earthquakes) ‡
- (United States) Josh Morton (2018, Chicago Fire) ^
- (United States) Danny Musovski (2018, San Jose Earthquakes) ^
- (United States) Kevin Partida (2018, San Jose Earthquakes) ^
- (United States) Drew Skundrich (2018, LA Galaxy) ^
- (United States) Amir Bashti (2019, Atlanta United FC) ^
- (United States) Camden Riley (2019, Sporting KC) ^
- (United States) Robbie Mertz (2019, Colorado Rapids) ^
- (United States) Tanner Beason (2020, San Jose Earthquakes) ^
- (United States) Remi Prieur (2020, Columbus Crew) ^
- (United States) Rei Dorwart (2022, Bay Cities FC)
- (United States) Andrew Paoli (2022, Bay Cities FC)
- (United States) Gabe Silveira (2022, Bay Cities FC)
- (United States) C.J. Grey (2022, San Jose Earthquakes II)

‡ Homegrown Signing

^ Selected in MLS SuperDraft
