= Pablo Caballero (footballer, born November 1987) =

Uruguayan association football player

Personal information
- Full name: Pablo Eduardo Caballero Sebastiani
- Date of birth: 21 November 1987 (age 38)
- Place of birth: Montevideo, Uruguay
- Height: 1.80 m (5 ft 11 in)
- Position: Midfielder

Team information
- Current team: Progreso
- Number: 16

Senior career*
Years	Team	Apps	(Gls)
2006–2016	Cerro	178	(25)
2011–2012	→ Defensor (loan)	5	(0)
2013	→ Reggina (loan)	4	(0)
2016	→ Independiente del Valle (loan)	36	(8)
2016	→ Racing de Montevideo (loan)	12	(2)
2017–2018	Murciélagos	26	(2)
2018–2019	Liverpool Montevideo	35	(1)
2020–2021	Cobreloa	27	(2)
2021	Sud América	27	(3)
2022	Central Español	21	(1)
2023–	Progreso	30	(3)
- * Club domestic league appearances and goals as of 14 September 2024

Pablo Eduardo Caballero Sebastiani (born 21 November 1987) is a Uruguayan professional footballer who plays as a midfielder for Progreso.

== Club career ==
In 2013, Caballero played for Reggina.

=== Cobreloa ===
On 22 December 2019, it was reported that Primera B de Chile side Cobreloa hired to Caballero. He made his debut on 13 January 2020 in a 2–0 home loss against Deportes Temuco. On 1 March, he scored his first goal in a 3–1 win to San Marcos de Arica.

On 9 March 2020, Caballero failed a penalty against A.C. Barnechea once his shoot was saved by German keeper Robert Moewes in a 2–2 away draw played in Barnechea Municipal Stadium. Then, Caballero rebuked Moewes as a result of his impotence whilst the German goalkeeper shouted him his failure in his face.

He netted his second goal on 6 January 2021 in a 6–0 home thrash over Deportes Valdivia, being his score the first one of the game.
