= Speakeasy Ales and Lagers =

Speakeasy Ales & Lagers
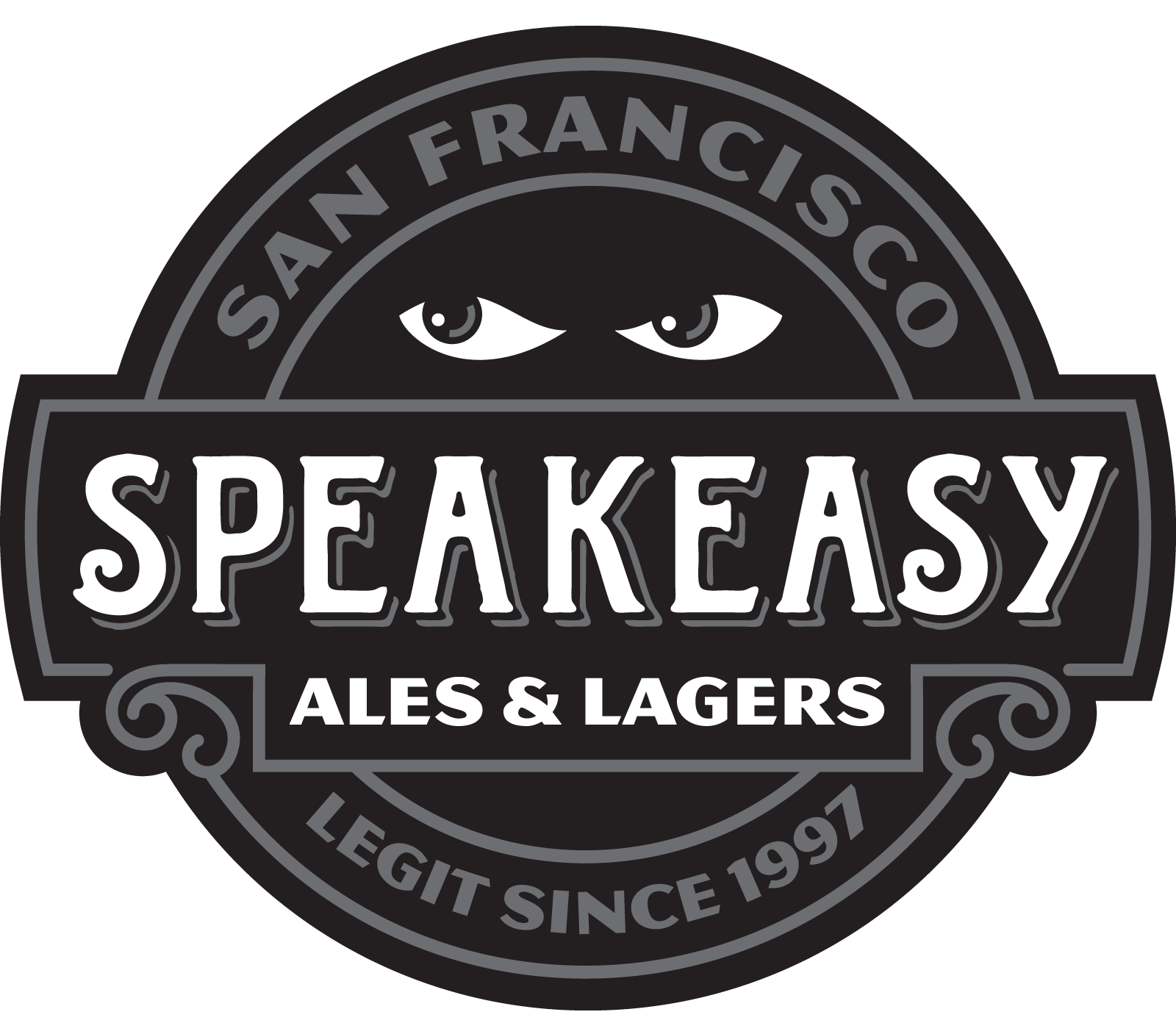
- Industry: Alcoholic beverage
- Founded: 1997
- Founder: Forest Gray / Steve Bruce
- Headquarters: San Francisco, California; United States,
- Products: Beer
- Owner: Hunters Point Brewery / Ces Butner

Speakeasy Ales & Lagers is a craft brewery that was founded in 1997 by Steve Bruce and Forest Gray in the Hunters Point neighborhood of San Francisco, California, USA. The company brands its beers with references to 1930s prohibition-era mobsters and organized crime. Prohibition Ale (an amber ale), the first beer the company produced, and Big Daddy IPA (an India Pale Ale), are two of the brewery's most popular beers. Speakeasy beer is primarily available in California, but has been distributed to over thirteen U.S. states and internationally. Speakeasy opened a tap room at the brewery in 2013, which is located at 1195 Evans Ave in San Francisco, CA, USA.

On March 10, 2017, Speakeasy announced that it had ceased operations for an indefinite period after struggling financially following a 2015 expansion for which they borrowed money from Union Bank. As a result, the company was placed into court ordered receivership and the brewery owner, Forest Gray, was forced out. Two months later Speakeasy Ales & Lagers was sold to Hunters Point Brewery, a holding company owned by Ces Butner, who is a former beer distributor based in Oakland, CA.

== Products ==
Speakeasy Ales & Lagers has produced a large variety of unique beers and are organized into distinct series.

The Usual Suspects

- Prohibition Ale - Gold Medal Winner at the 2013 Great American Beer Festival in the amber/red category
- Big Daddy IPA
- Double Daddy Imperial IPA
- Payback Porter
- Metropolis Lager
- Scarlett Red Rye Ale
- Tallulah Extra Pale Ale
- Payback Coffee Porter
- Blood Orange Double Daddy Imperial IPA

Session Series

- Baby Daddy Session IPA
- Pop Gun Pilsner
- Suds Session Ale

The Limited Series

- Black Hand Chocolate Milk Stout
- Vendetta India Pale Ale
- Untouchable Pale Ale
- Betrayal Imperial Red Ale

Infamous Series

- Blind Tiger Imperial IPA
- Old Godfather Barleywine
- Barrel-aged Old Godfather Barleywine
- Scarface Imperial Stout
- Barrel-aged Scarface Imperial Stout
- Fixed Fight Barrel-aged Old Ale

Syndicate Series: a blend of vintage strong ales aged in bourbon barrels no less than a year

- Syndicate Series No. 01
- Syndicate Series No. 02
- Syndicate Series No. 03
- Syndicate Series No. 04

== Official Website ==
- GoodBeer.com

== See also ==
- California breweries
- Barrel-aged beer
