= Iván Valencia =

Mexican footballer (born 1999)

Personal information
- Date of birth: 23 January 1999 (age 27)
- Place of birth: Guadalajara, Mexico
- Height: 1.78 m (5 ft 10 in)
- Position: Defensive midfielder

Team information
- Current team: California United Strikers
- Number: 14

Youth career
- 2015–2018: San Jose Earthquakes

Senior career*
| Years | Team | Apps | (Gls) |
| 2018–2020 | Reno 1868 | 1 | (0) |
| 2019–2020 | California United Strikers | 4 | (1) |
- * Club domestic league appearances and goals as of 23 April 2022

Iván Valencia (born 23 January 1999) is a Mexican footballer who plays as a midfielder for the California United Strikers FC in the National Independent Soccer Association.

== Career ==
After playing with the San Jose Earthquakes academy since 2015, Valencia signed his first professional contract with USL Championship side Reno 1868 on 21 May 2018. Valencia was released by Reno at the end of the season, but continued to train with the club. He re-signed for Reno on 14 September 2019.

He made his professional debut on 15 September 2019, appearing as an 80th-minute substitute in a 2–1 win over Austin Bold.

Reno folded their team on November 6, 2020, due to the financial impact of the COVID-19 pandemic.

Ahead of the 2022 NISA season, Valencia signed with California United Strikers.
