= Bay Cities FC =

- Full name: Bay Cities Football Club
- Founded: 2021
- Stadium: Terremere Field
- Capacity: 3,500
- President: Anders Perez
- Sporting director: Eric Bucchere
- Head coach: Anders Perez
- League: National Independent Soccer Association
- Website: https://www.baycitiesfc.com/

Bay Cities FC was an American professional soccer team based in Redwood City, California that began play in 2022 to play in the National Independent Soccer Association, in the third tier of the US soccer pyramid. The club played in NISA until August 26, when financial difficulties forced the club to prematurely end the season.

== History ==
Bay Cities Football Club was founded in 2021 in Redwood City, California by the co-owners Anders Perez, Ivan Martinez and K.C. Watson. During 2021 BCFC took part at the 2021 NISA Independent Cup, where they finished 3rd of the Pacific Region, just behind PDX FC and Space United FC. Later that year the club announced Eric Bucchere as sporting director and National Independent Soccer Association accepted Bay Cities' application for the 2022 season. Bay Cities FC will become the sixth professional soccer club of Northern California after San Jose Earthquakes, Sacramento Republic FC, Oakland Roots, Monterey Bay FC and Central Valley Fuego FC.

On April 6, 2022, they defeated USL Championship side Monterey Bay FC 2–1 at PayPal Park, San Jose, in the US Open Cup. Bay Cities FC were defeated by the San Jose Earthquakes 5-0 to end their US Open Cup run at the same venue they previously won at.

On July 23rd, 2022, Bay Cities FC took part in the 2022 NISA Independent Cup. Bay Cities FC were defeated by Wenatchee All-Stars FC 1-0 which ended their run. Unfortunately, soon after the team paused operations due to financial difficulties forced the club to prematurely end the season.

== Bay Cities FC (Women's Team) ==
On April 27th, 2022, Bay Cities FC formally announced their participation in UPSL.

== Colors, motto and supporters ==
BCFC colors are gold and black, the colors of the 'Golden State' and their motto is Bridge the Bay; in fact the club's major goal is to take a professional soccer team to the 700,000 soccer fans that live in the western Bay Area, that haven't had a pro club since the San Francisco Deltas folded in 2017.

Bay Cities FC supporters group is the 'Legion del oro'.

== Ground ==
Bay Cities FC played their home games at Terremere Field in Redwood City, California.

== Roster ==
As of September 29, 2022

No.	Position	Nation	Player
—	MF	USA	Edson Cardona
—	DF	USA	Alan Cruz
—	MF	USA	Rei Dorwart
—	DF	USA	Jacob Goyen
—	DF	USA	Andrés Jiménez
—	FW	MEX	Tony Jimenez
—	DF	USA	David Kinnear
—	MF	USA	Mumbi Kwesele
—	GK	USA	Alonso Lara
—	FW	USA	Anthony Orendain
—	DF	USA	Jacob Penner
—	MF	USA	Victor Romero
—	FW	USA	Kevin Salto
—	FW	USA	Malik Shaheed
—	MF	USA	Gabe Silveira
—	FW	BRA	Marco Silveira
—	MF	USA	Adolfo Trujillo
—	DF	USA	Danny Turgeon
—	MF	MEX	Iván Valencia
—	MF	USA	Carlos Gomez-Zavala
