= Eric Bucchere =

American soccer coach

Eric Bucchere is the co-founder and current CEO and Sporting Director of Path2Pro Soccer.

Prior to joining Path2Pro Bucchere was an American soccer coach who most recently an assistant coach with Reno 1868 FC in the United Soccer League.

Prior to his role with Reno 1868 FC, Bucchere was the head coach of Burlingame Dragons FC of the Premier Development League in 2016. Bucchere led the team to a PDL Western Conference Final Four appearance in his first season as head coach. Several Burlingame Dragons FC players signed professional contracts into Major League Soccer after the 2016 season, including Nick Lima of the San Jose Earthquakes.

In addition to his time coaching in the PDL and USL, Bucchere also coached college soccer for 12 years, most recently as the head coach of men's soccer program at Menlo College. In four seasons in charge from 2013–2016, Bucchere accumulated a 43-23-9 record at Menlo, including a program-best ever record of 15-5-1 in 2016. In 2016, Bucchere led Menlo to the first ever Golden State Athletic Conference championship in men's soccer and Menlo College history.

Bucchere also served an assistant coach of men's soccer for the UC Santa Cruz Banana Slugs from 2006–2008, and UC San Diego Tritons from 2008-2013.

Bucchere also has experience coaching in the U.S. Soccer Development Academy, working with the U16-U18 teams for the San Diego Surf (soccer) from 2008–2013, and also with the San Jose Earthquakes from 2013-2015.
