= USL W-League =

USL W-League may refer to:

- USL W League
- USL W-League (1995–2015)
