= 2024 USL W League season =

USL W League
- Season: 2024
- Dates: May 4 - June 30 (regular season); July 5 - July 20 (playoffs)
- Champions: North Carolina Courage U23 (1st Title)
- Regular Season title: Florida Elite SA (1st Title)
- Matches: 478
- Goals: 2,162 (4.52 per match)
- Best player: (United States) Anna Haddock Tennessee SC
- Top goalscorer: (United States) Luciana Setteducate Long Island Rough Riders (18 Goals)
- Best goalkeeper: (United States) Gabrielle Schriver Detroit City FC
- Biggest home win: Tennessee SC 15–0 Athens United (5/24)
- Biggest away win: CISA 0–14 Colorado Storm (6/01) AC Connecticut 0–14 Morris Elite SC (6/08) RKC Soccer Club 0–14 Minnesota Aurora FC (6/29)
- Highest scoring: Tennessee SC 15–0 Athens United (5/24)
- Longest winning run: North Carolina Courage U23 (14 games)
- Longest unbeaten run: North Carolina Courage U23 (16 games)
- Longest winless run: Fayetteville Fury, Patuxent Football Athletics, CISA (12 games)
- Longest losing run: Fayetteville Fury, Patuxent Football Athletics, CISA (12 games)
- All statistics correct as of 13:36, July 22, 2024 (UTC).

The 2024 USL W League season was the 3rd season for the league. The regular season began on May 4 and ended on June 30. 80 teams participated, playing in 4 conferences with 12 divisions total.

== Team changes ==
=== New teams ===
- AC Houston Sur (Houston, TX)
- AHFC Royals (Houston, TX)
- Albion SC Colorado (Lafayette, CO)
- Athens United (Athens, GA)
- Brevard SC Riptide (Melbourne, FL)
- Brooke House FC (Maitland, FL)
- Carolina Ascent FC (Charlotte, NC)
- Challenge SC Women (Tomball, TX)
- Charlotte Eagles (Charlotte, NC)
- Charlottesville Blues FC (Charlottesville, VA)
- CISA (Colorado International Soccer Academy)
- Colorado Storm (Denver, CO)
- Fayetteville Fury (Fayetteville, NC)
- Flatirons FC (Arvada, CO)
- Lancaster Inferno FC (Lancaster, PA)
- Lonestar SC Women (Austin, TX)
- Michiana FC (South Bend, IN)
- Northern Colorado Rain FC (Windsor)
- Richmond Ivy SC (Richmond, VA)
- River Light FC (Aurora, IL)
- San Antonio Athenians SC
- Tacoma Galaxy
- TLH Reckoning (Tallahassee, FL)

=== Departing teams ===
- Charlotte Independence
- FA Euro New York
- FC Carolinas
- FC Miami City
- Green Bay Glory (moved to Women's Premier Soccer League)
- McLean Soccer women (moved to Women's Premier Soccer League)
- North Alabama SC
- PDX FC

=== Renamed Teams ===
- Oly Town FC to FC Olympia

== Standings ==
=== Eastern Conference ===
==== Metropolitan Division ====
Pos	Team	Pld	W	D	L	GF	GA	GD	Pts	PPG	Qualification
1	Long Island Rough Riders (Q)	12	10	2	0	69	9	+60	32	2.67	Advance to USL W League Playoffs
2	Morris Elite SC	12	8	2	2	69	11	+58	26	2.17	
3	Paisley Athletic FC	12	6	2	4	44	37	+7	20	1.67	
4	Cedar Stars	12	6	2	4	35	19	+16	20	1.67	
5	Westchester Flames	12	3	2	7	13	43	−30	11	0.92	
6	Manhattan SC	12	2	2	8	17	53	−36	8	0.67	
7	AC Connecticut	12	1	0	11	12	87	−75	3	0.25	

Source: USL
(Q) Qualified for the phase indicated

==== Mid Atlantic Division ====
Pos	Team	Pld	W	D	L	GF	GA	GD	Pts	PPG	Qualification
1	Eagle FC (Q)	12	10	1	1	38	7	+31	31	2.58	Advance to USL W League Playoffs
2	Lancaster Inferno FC (Q)	12	10	1	1	50	7	+43	31	2.58	Advance to USL W League Playoffs
3	Virginia Marauders FC	12	8	0	4	32	17	+15	24	2.00	
4	Richmond Ivy SC	12	6	1	5	24	18	+6	19	1.58	
5	Christos FC	12	5	3	4	29	21	+8	18	1.50	
6	Northern Virginia FC	12	4	0	8	28	21	+7	12	1.00	
7	Charlottesville Blues FC	12	2	0	10	11	34	−23	6	0.50	
8	Patuxent Football Athletics	12	0	0	12	5	92	−87	0	0.00	

Source: USL
(Q) Qualified for the phase indicated

==== South Atlantic Division ====
Pos	Team	Pld	W	D	L	GF	GA	GD	Pts	PPG	Qualification
1	North Carolina Courage U23 (Q)	12	11	1	0	56	6	+50	34	2.83	Advance to USL W League Playoffs
2	Tormenta FC	12	9	2	1	36	10	+26	29	2.42	
3	Carolina Ascent FC	12	7	1	4	36	10	+26	22	1.83	
4	North Carolina Fusion	12	7	0	5	23	16	+7	21	1.75	
5	Wake FC	12	6	1	5	16	20	−4	19	1.58	
6	South Carolina United FC	12	4	1	7	18	33	−15	13	1.08	
7	Charlotte Eagles	12	1	0	11	5	41	−36	3	0.25	
8	Fayetteville Fury	12	0	0	12	1	55	−54	0	0.00	

Source: USL
(Q) Qualified for the phase indicated

=== Central Conference ===
==== Great Lakes Division ====
Pos	Team	Pld	W	D	L	GF	GA	GD	Pts	PPG	Qualification
1	Detroit City FC (Q)	12	10	2	0	24	5	+19	32	2.67	Advance to USL W League Playoffs
2	Kalamazoo FC	12	7	2	3	26	9	+17	23	1.92	
3	Midwest United FC	12	7	0	5	22	14	+8	21	1.75	
4	Cleveland Force SC	12	5	1	6	22	18	+4	16	1.33	
5	AFC Ann Arbor	12	5	1	6	21	19	+2	16	1.33	
6	Flint City AFC	12	4	0	8	18	28	−10	12	1.00	
7	Michiana Lions FC	12	1	0	11	12	52	−40	3	0.25	

Source: USL
(Q) Qualified for the phase indicated

==== Heartland Division ====
Pos	Team	Pld	W	D	L	GF	GA	GD	Pts	PPG	Qualification
1	Minnesota Aurora FC (Q)	12	10	2	0	61	6	+55	32	2.67	Advance to USL W League Playoffs
2	River Light FC (Q)	12	8	1	3	49	11	+38	25	2.08	Advance to USL W League Playoffs
3	Chicago City SC	12	6	1	5	29	22	+7	19	1.58	
4	Bavarian United SC	12	6	1	5	28	33	−5	19	1.58	
5	Rochester FC	12	4	0	8	22	34	−12	12	1.00	
6	Chicago Dutch Lions	12	3	0	9	11	45	−34	9	0.75	
7	RKC Soccer Club	12	2	1	9	13	62	−49	7	0.58	

First match(es) will be played: complete. Source: USL
(Q) Qualified for the phase indicated

==== Valley Division ====
Pos	Team	Pld	W	D	L	GF	GA	GD	Pts	PPG	Qualification
1	Indy Eleven (Q)	10	7	2	1	38	13	+25	23	2.30	Advance to USL W League Playoffs
2	Kings Hammer FC	10	6	2	2	28	15	+13	20	2.00	
3	Lexington SC	10	4	2	4	23	13	+10	14	1.40	
4	Racing Louisville FC	10	4	2	4	32	17	+15	14	1.40	
5	St. Charles FC	10	0	0	10	2	65	−63	0	0.00	

Source: USL
(Q) Qualified for the phase indicated

=== Southern Conference ===
==== South Central Division ====
Pos	Team	Pld	W	D	L	GF	GA	GD	Pts	PPG	Qualification
1	Tennessee SC (Q)	12	9	2	1	49	12	+37	29	2.42	Advance to USL W League Playoffs
2	Asheville City SC (Q)	12	8	2	2	28	13	+15	26	2.17	Advance to USL W League Playoffs
3	Chattanooga Red Wolves SC	12	5	3	4	26	13	+13	18	1.50	
4	Southern Soccer Academy	12	4	4	4	25	17	+8	16	1.33	
5	Greenville Liberty SC	12	5	1	6	17	13	+4	16	1.33	
6	Birmingham Legion WFC	12	4	1	7	14	24	−10	13	1.08	
7	Athens United	12	0	1	11	4	71	−67	1	0.08	

Source: USL
(Q) Qualified for the phase indicated

==== Southeast Division ====
Pos	Team	Pld	W	D	L	GF	GA	GD	Pts	PPG	Qualification
1	Florida Elite SA (Q)	12	12	0	0	73	6	+67	36	3.00	Advance to USL W League Playoffs
2	Tampa Bay United	11	8	1	2	45	10	+35	25	2.27	
3	Palm City Americanas	11	7	1	3	36	21	+15	22	2.00	
4	Miami AC	11	6	1	4	42	19	+23	19	1.73	
5	TLH Reckoning	12	3	2	7	16	60	−44	11	0.92	
6	Brooke House FC	12	2	2	8	10	46	−36	8	0.67	
7	Brevard SC	11	2	1	8	9	47	−38	7	0.64	
8	Swan City SC	12	2	0	10	17	39	−22	6	0.50	

Source: USL
(Q) Qualified for the phase indicated

==== Lone Star Division ====
Pos	Team	Pld	W	D	L	GF	GA	GD	Pts	PPG	Qualification
1	AHFC Royals (Q)	10	10	0	0	43	4	+39	30	3.00	Advance to USL W League Playoffs
2	Challenge SC	10	5	1	4	24	16	+8	16	1.60	
3	Lonestar SC	10	4	2	4	27	17	+10	14	1.40	
4	San Antonio Athenians SC	10	4	1	5	23	21	+2	13	1.30	
5	AC Houston Sur	10	0	0	10	0	59	−59	0	0.00	

Source: USL
(Q) Qualified for the phase indicated

=== Western Conference ===
==== Northwest Division ====
Pos	Team	Pld	W	D	L	GF	GA	GD	Pts	PPG	Qualification
1	FC Olympia (Q)	10	9	1	0	45	4	+41	28	2.80	Advance to USL W League Playoffs
2	United PDX	10	7	2	1	28	9	+19	23	2.30	
3	Tacoma Galaxy	10	3	1	6	11	22	−11	10	1.00	
4	Capital FC Atletica	10	2	0	8	9	35	−26	6	0.60	
5	Lane United FC	10	1	2	7	6	29	−23	5	0.50	

Source: USL
(Q) Qualified for the phase indicated

==== Nor Cal Division ====
Pos	Team	Pld	W	D	L	GF	GA	GD	Pts	PPG	Qualification
1	California Storm (Q)	12	9	3	0	38	5	+33	30	2.50	Advance to USL W League Playoffs
2	Oakland Soul SC (Q)	12	9	3	0	34	12	+22	30	2.50	Advance to USL W League Playoffs
3	San Francisco Glens	12	8	2	2	36	14	+22	26	2.17	
4	Stockton Cargo SC	12	7	2	3	32	13	+19	23	1.92	
5	Olympic Club SC	12	3	1	8	9	41	−32	10	0.83	
6	Academica SC	12	3	0	9	23	44	−21	9	0.75	
7	Pleasanton RAGE	12	1	3	8	16	36	−20	6	0.50	
8	Marin FC Siren	12	1	0	11	10	33	−23	3	0.25	

Source: USL
(Q) Qualified for the phase indicated

==== Mountain Division ====
Pos	Team	Pld	W	D	L	GF	GA	GD	Pts	PPG	Qualification
1	Colorado Storm (Q)	12	10	1	1	56	4	+52	31	2.58	Advance to USL W League Playoffs
2	Northern Colorado Rain FC	12	8	1	3	43	13	+30	25	2.08	
3	Albion SC Colorado	12	8	0	4	24	15	+9	24	2.00	
4	Flatirons SC	12	3	0	9	20	23	−3	9	0.75	
5	CISA	12	0	0	12	3	91	−88	0	0.00	

Source: USL
(Q) Qualified for the phase indicated

== Playoffs ==
=== Bracket ===
Conference Semifinals
NC Courage U23	4
Lancaster Inferno FC	0
Eastern Conference
Long Island Rough Riders	2
Eagle FC*	1
Florida Elite SA	1
Asheville City SC*	2
Southern Conference
AHFC Royals	0
Tennessee SC	1
Minnesota Aurora FC	1
Indy Eleven	2
Central Conference
Detroit City FC*	3
River Light FC	0
FC Olympia	2
Oakland Soul SC*	1
Western Conference
Colorado Storm	3
California Storm*	0

Conference Finals
NC Courage U23	3
Long Island Rough Riders	0
Asheville City SC*	0
Tennessee SC	1
Indy Eleven	1
Detroit City FC*	3
FC Olympia	0
Colorado Storm	1

Semifinals
NC Courage U23*	2
Tennessee SC	1
Detroit City FC*	1
Colorado Storm	2

Final
NC Courage U23*	3
Colorado Storm	2

(*) Host cities for Conference Semifinals and Finals; National Semis

=== Conference semifinals ===
July 5	NC Courage U23	4–0	Lancaster Inferno FC	Mechanicsburg, Pennsylvania
3:00 PM EDT	Kennedy 7'; Garner 11'; Jibril 40', 78'; Brown (yellow card) 87'	Report	Rook (yellow card) 32'	Stadium: Mountain View Middle School; Referee: Elena Dauphinais

July 5	Minnesota Aurora FC	1–2	Indy Eleven	Hamtramck, Michigan
4:00 PM EDT	Duong 66'; Rapp (yellow card) 74'	Report	Cherry 3'; Mitchell 83'	Stadium: Keyworth Stadium

July 5	AHFC Royals	0–1	Tennessee SC	Asheville, North Carolina
4:00 PM EDT	O'Brien (yellow card) 52'	Report	Makanjuola (yellow card) 3'; Molenaar 17' (yellow card) 40'	Stadium: Greenwood Field; Referee: Amy Balbier

July 5	Detroit City FC	3–0	River Light FC	Hamtramck, Michigan
7:00 PM EDT	Bosley 6'; Jeakle 68'; Pagett 80'	Report		Stadium: Keyworth Stadium; Referee: JEREN GHOUJEGHI

July 5	Eagle FC	1–2	Long Island Rough Riders	Mechanicsburg, Pennsylvania
7:00 PM EDT	Fazackerley (yellow card) 60'; Butlion (yellow card) 64'; Baruwa 69'	Report	Davies 13'; Howard 39'; DeMasi (yellow card) 40'	Stadium: Mountain View Middle School; Referee: Elena Dauphinais

July 5	Asheville City SC	2–1	Florida Elite Soccer Academy	Asheville, North Carolina
7:30 PM EDT	Viera (yellow card) 17'; Bench (yellow card) 61'; DeMarco 73'; Dew 82'	Report	Hernandez 57'	Stadium: Greenwood Field; Referee: Justin Hughes

July 5	Oakland Soul SC	1–2 (a.e.t.)	FC Olympia	Hayward, California
10:00 PM EDT	Geis 65'		Martinez 59'; Raffensperger 96'	Stadium: Pioneer Stadium; Referee: Jose Leon Amparan

July 5	California Storm	0–3	Colorado Storm	Davis, California
10:00 PM EDT	Levoy (yellow card) 87'	Report	Crockett (yellow card) 39'; Cheesman 45'; McDermott 55'; Dean 90'	Stadium: Davis Legacy Field; Referee: ADRIANA CONTRERAS

=== Conference Finals ===
July 7	Detroit City FC	3–1	Indy Eleven	Hamtramck, Michigan
1:00 PM EDT	Pagett 20'; Romine 45+1'; Addison 75'	Report	Whitsett 7'	Stadium: Keyworth Stadium; Referee: JARIN HARRELL

July 7	FC Olympia	0–1	Colorado Storm	Davis, California
2:00 PM EDT	Hussen (yellow card) 67'	Report	Goodrich 19'; Fernandez (yellow card) 70'; Gallegos (yellow card) 84'	Stadium: Davis Legacy Field; Referee: PEDRO VASQUEZ-LUNA

July 7	NC Courage U23	3–0	Long Island Rough Riders	Mechanicsburg, Pennsylvania
5:30 PM EDT	Strickland 21'; Garner 29'; Jibril 90'	Report		Stadium: Mountain View Middle School; Referee: Emma Elwell

July 7	Asheville City SC	0–1	Tennessee SC	Asheville, North Carolina
7:30 PM EDT	Wells (yellow card) 62'	Report	Mitchell 75'	Stadium: Greenwood Field; Referee: John Andres

=== Semifinals ===
July 13	NC Courage U23	2–1 (a.e.t.)	Tennessee SC	Cary, North Carolina
6:00 PM EDT	Herr 59'; O'Neill (yellow card) 77'; Davis 108'	Report	Molenaar (yellow card) 85'; Haddock 90' (pen.); Fisher (yellow card) 90'	Stadium: WakeMed Soccer Park Field 2

July 13	Detroit City FC	1–2	Colorado Storm	Hamtramck, Michigan
7:00 PM EDT	Peters 11' (yellow card) 71'; Murphy (yellow card) 35' (yellow-red card) 90'; Pagett (yellow card) 62'	Report	McDermott 36', 90'; Smith (yellow card) 67'	Stadium: Keyworth Stadium

=== Final ===
July 20
6:00 PM EDT

NC Courage U23	3–2	Colorado Storm
Jibril 7'; Bader 66'; Geigle 71'	Report	Cheesman 4'; Whitehouse 85'

WRAL Soccer Park, Raleigh, North Carolina
Referee: Amy Balbier

NC Courage U23	Colorado Storm

GK	1	(United States) Emily Edwards
LB	2	(United States) Aven Alvarez
CB	20	(United States) Kayleigh Herr
CB	22	(United States) Taylor Chism
RB	21	(United States) Kendall Holt
LM	4	(United States) Bailey Goldthwaite		(substituted off) 64'
CM	29	(United States) Amelia Brown	(yellow card) 63'	(substituted off) 78'
RM	5	(United States) Phoebe Goldthwaite
LW	16	(United States) Ivy Garner		(substituted off) 78'
FW	6	(United States) Hannah Jibril		(substituted off) 64'
RW	15	(United States) Mia Oliaro
Substitutes:
FW	3	(United States) Mackenzie Geigle		(substituted on) 64'
FW	8	(United States) Leah Kuklick
FW	11	(United States) Alexis Strickland		(substituted on) 78'
MF	14	(United States) Cazzi Norgren		(substituted on) 78'
FW	17	(United States) Macey Bader		(substituted on) 64'
DF	25	(United States) Lindsey Hailey
MF	26	(United States) Syrianna Davis
Manager:
(United States) Willie Davis Jr.

GK	1	(United States) Addie Todd
LB	12	(United States) Sydney Cheesman
CB	39	(United States) Avery Vander Ven		(substituted off) 71'
CB	38	(United States) Hannah Gallegos
RB	40	(United States) Caley Swierenga		(substituted off) 45'
LM	10	(United States) Lexi Meyer	(yellow card) 45'	(substituted off) 52'
CM	37	(United States) Makayla Merlo		(substituted off) 52'
RM	9	(United States) Reagan Kotschau
LW	11	(El Salvador) Makenna Dominguez		(substituted off) 71'
FW	15	(United States) Amy Smith		(substituted off) 45'
RW	19	(United States) Reese McDermott
Substitutes:
GK	0	(United States) Ashlyn Bartley
MF	2	(United States) Riley Baker		(substituted on) 71'
MF	5	(United States) Jadyn Goodrich		(substituted on) 52'
MF	20	(United States) Adeleine Walick		(substituted on) 52'
DF	23	(United States) Jordan Crockett		(substituted on) 45'
FW	32	(United States) Addie Whitehouse		(substituted on) 45'
DF	33	(United States) Ashlyn Fernandez	(yellow card) 90'	(substituted on) 71'
Manager:
(United States) Sebastian Giraldo				(yellow card) 90'

Most Valuable Player:
(United States) Macey Bader

Match rules

- 90 minutes.
- 30 minutes of extra time if necessary.
- Penalty shootout if scores still level.
- Maximum of seven substitutions.

== Awards ==
=== Individual awards ===
Award	Winner	Team	Reason	Ref.
Player of the Year	(United States) Anna Haddock	Tennessee SC	22 goal contributions (11 goals, 11 assists)	
Golden Boot	(United States) Luciana Setteducate	Long Island Rough Riders	18 goals	
Golden Glove	(United States) Gabrielle Schriver	Detroit City FC	8 clean sheets, 0.294 goal against average	
Defender of the Year	(Scotland) Georgia Brown	Florida Elite Soccer Academy	Defense only allowed 6 goals	
Young (U20) Player of the Year	(United States) Abby Droner	Paisley Athletic FC	12 goals, 1 assist	
Coach of the Year	(United States) Stephanie Cleaves	Lancaster Inferno	10-1-1 record, 2nd place, 50 goals	

=== Monthly Awards ===
Month	Player of the Month				References
Month	Player	Club	Position	Reason	References
May	(Scotland) Georgia Brown	Florida Elite SA	Defender	6 goals in 5 games	
May	(United States) Katie Duong	Minnesota Aurora FC	Midfielder	8 goals in 7 straight games	

Team of the Month
Month	Goalkeeper	Defenders	Midfielders	Forwards	Bench	Ref.
May	(United States) Gabrielle Schriver (DET)	(United States) Tessa Dellarose (RCL) (United States) Camryn Lancaster (CAL) (Scotland) Georgia Brown (FLE) (England) Lucy Fazackerley (EFC)	(United States) Alexis Meyer (COL) (United States) Anna Haddock (TEN)	(United States) Amelia White (IND) (United States) Luciana Setteducate (LIR) (United States) Lauren Geczik (ROY) (United States) Mariah Nguyen (MNA)	(United States) Katelyn Fishnick (LEX) (United States) Sam Tran (OAK) (United States) Grace Ivey (FLE) (Japan) Momo Nakao (TRM) (United States) Julie Mackin (GVL) (United States) Paige Churchill (TLH) (United States) Alyssa Glover (COL)	
June	(United States) Jenna Moran (TOR)	(United States) Ryelle Shuey (LNC) (United States) Ella Offer (DET) (United States) Alyssa Bourgeois (CAL)	(United States) Katie Duong (MNA) (United States) Reagan Kotschau (COL) (United States) Anna Haddock (TEN) (Jamaica) Nikayla Small (EFC) (United States) Ella Rogers (IND)	(United States) McKenna Martinez (OLY) (United States) Shae Murison (OAK)	(United States) Elle Piper (SFG) (Bulgaria) Viky Adrianova (FLE) (United States) Jenna Butler (CAR) (United States) Margo Matula (ROY) (Colombia) Ilana Izquierdo (ASH) (United States) Gianna Paul (LIR) (United States) Mackenzie Anthony (RVL)	

=== All-league teams ===
First team
Goalkeeper	Defenders	Midfielders	Forwards
(United States) Gabby Schriver (DET)	(United States) Ryelle Shuey (LAN) (Scotland) Georgia Brown (FLE) (United States) Ella Offer (DET) (United States) Kayleigh Herr (NCC)	(United States) Katie Duong (MNA) (United States) Alexis Meyer (COL) (United States) Anna Haddock (TEN) (United States) Zoe Main (AHFC)	(United States) Luciana Setteducate (LIR) (United States) Ivy Garner (NCC)

Second team
Goalkeeper	Defenders	Midfielders	Forwards
(United States) Adelyn Todd (COL)	(England) Lucy Fazackerley (EAG) (United States) Alyssa Bourgeois (CAL) (United States) Jenna Butler (CAR)	(United States) Macey Bader (NCC) (United States) Sam Tran (OAK) (United States) Ella Rogers (IND) (Colombia) Ilana Izquierdo (ASH)	(United States) Shaelan Murison (OAK) (United States) McKenna Martinez (OLY) (United States) Abby Droner (PAA)

Divisional Players of the Year
Division	Player	Team
Great Lakes	(United States) Gabby Schriver	Detroit City FC
Heartland	(United States) Katie Duong	Minnesota Aurora FC
Lone Star	(United States) Zoe Main	AHFC Royals
Metropolitan	(United States) Lucianna Setteducate	Long Island Rough Riders
Mid Atlantic	(United States) Ryelle Shuey	Lancaster Inferno
Mountain	(United States) Alexis Meyer	Colorado Storm
NorCal	(United States) Alyssa Bourgeois	California Storm
Northwest	(United States) McKenna Martinez	FC Olympia
Southeast	(Scotland) Georgia Brown	Florida Elite Soccer Academy
South Atlantic	(United States) Kayleigh Herr	North Carolina Courage U23
South Central	(United States) Anna Haddock	Tennessee SC
Valley	(United States) Ella Roger	Indy Eleven
