= 2018 WPSL season =

WPSL
- Season: 2018

The 2018 WPSL season is the 21st season of the Women's Premier Soccer League. The Central Conference consists of 4 sections.

== Standings ==
=== Central Region ===
==== Northern Conference ====
Pos	Team	Pld	W	L	T	GF	GA	GD	Pts
1	Chicago Red Stars Reserves	10	9	0	1	47	3	+44	28
2	Fire SC 98	10	6	2	2	26	13	+13	20
3	Milwaukee Torrent	10	3	1	6	20	13	+7	15
4	Chicago City SC	10	3	5	2	20	21	−1	11
5	Maplebrook Fury	10	2	6	2	9	34	−25	8
6	Dakota Fusion FC	10	0	9	1	8	46	−38	1

Source: 2018 WPSL Northern Conference standings

==== Heartland Conference ====
Pos	Team	Pld	W	L	T	GF	GA	GD	Pts
1	Fire & Ice SC	8	5	0	3	23	4	+19	18
2	Des Moines Menace Women	8	4	3	1	13	10	+3	13
3	Kansas City Athletics	8	3	2	3	16	9	+7	12
4	St. Louis Lions	8	2	2	4	11	10	+1	10
5	KC Courage	8	0	7	1	2	32	−30	1

Source: 2018 WPSL Heartland Conference standings

==== Red River Conference ====
Pos	Team	Pld	W	L	T	GF	GA	GD	Pts
1	FC Dallas	9	8	0	1	39	9	+30	25
2	Oklahoma City FC	10	5	4	1	16	17	−1	16
3	Fortuna Tulsa	10	4	2	4	17	11	+6	16
4	FC Wichita	9	4	4	1	19	13	+6	13
5	Texas Spurs FC	10	3	6	1	18	21	−3	10
6	Little Rock Rangers	10	0	8	2	7	45	−38	2

Source: 2018 WPSL Red River Conference standings

==== Mountain Conference ====
Pos	Team	Pld	W	L	T	GF	GA	GD	Pts
1	TTi Bluebonnets	8	7	1	0	18	8	+10	21
2	AHFC Royals	8	5	2	1	16	9	+7	16
3	Lonestar SC	8	5	3	0	17	8	+9	15
4	San Antonio Blossoms	8	2	5	1	11	18	−7	7
5	Texas Titans	8	0	8	0	7	26	−19	0

Source: 2018 WPSL Mountain Conference standings

=== East Region ===
==== Midwest Conference ====
Pos	Team	Pld	W	L	T	GF	GA	GD	Pts
1	Washington Spirit Reserves	3	1	0	2	8	2	+6	5
2	Legacy W76	3	1	0	2	5	0	+5	5
3	Virginia Beach City FC	2	0	0	2	2	2	0	2
4	Old Dominion Cesena USA	2	0	2	0	0	11	−11	0

Source: 2018 WPSL Midwest Conference standings
Rules for classification: 1) points; 2) head-to-head; 3) goal differential in head-to-head results; 4) wins; 5) total goal differential; 6) fewest losses; 7) coin toss

==== Metropolitan Conference ====
Pos	Team	Pld	W	L	T	GF	GA	GD	Pts
1	SUSA FC	8	7	1	0	28	7	+21	21
2	New York Athletic Club	8	6	2	0	28	8	+20	18
3	Rhode Island Rogues	8	3	4	1	12	15	−3	10
4	PSA Wildcats	8	2	6	0	13	19	−6	6
5	Long Island Fury	8	1	6	1	5	37	−32	4

Source: 2018 WPSL Metropolitan Conference standings

==== Mid-Atlantic Conference ====
Pos	Team	Pld	W	L	T	GF	GA	GD	Pts
1	Penn Fusion SA	8	6	2	0	31	9	+22	18
2	Torch FC	8	5	2	1	12	5	+7	16
3	Philly Fever	8	4	2	2	11	10	+1	14
4	Lehigh Valley Tempest	8	2	6	0	6	18	−12	6
5	Hershey FC	8	1	6	1	7	25	−18	4

Source: 2018 WPSL Mid-Atlantic Conference standings

==== Ohio Valley Conference ====
Pos	Team	Pld	W	L	T	GF	GA	GD	Pts
1	Cleveland Ambassadors	8	7	0	1	32	9	+23	22
2	Columbus Eagles FC	8	5	1	2	19	7	+12	17
3	Motor City FC	8	5	2	1	28	5	+23	16
4	Cincinnati Sirens FC	8	5	3	0	26	18	+8	15
5	FC Pride	8	4	2	2	19	17	+2	14
6	Steel City FC	8	2	5	1	13	22	−9	7
7	Indy Saints FC	8	2	6	0	11	31	−20	6
8	Empire Revs	8	1	6	1	7	31	−24	4
9	AAFC Lumberjills	8	1	7	0	9	24	−15	3

Source: 2018 WPSL Ohio Valley Conference standings

=== South Region ===
==== Carolinas Conference ====
Pos	Team	Pld	W	L	T	GF	GA	GD	Pts
1	Carolina Rapids	10	9	1	0	32	12	+20	27
2	Asheville City SC	10	8	1	1	38	7	+31	25
3	Oak City United	10	5	4	1	19	19	0	16
4	Beaufort County FC	10	4	4	2	14	13	+1	14
5	Charleston Fleet FC	9	4	4	1	17	10	+7	13
6	Lake Norman Eclipse	9	3	4	2	14	22	−8	11
7	North Carolina Fusion U-23	10	1	6	3	7	27	−20	6
8	Discoveries FC	10	0	10	0	5	36	−31	0

Source: 2018 WPSL Carolinas Conference standings

==== Sunshine Conference ====
Pos	Team	Pld	W	L	T	GF	GA	GD	Pts
1	Tampa Bay United	7	5	1	1	16	6	+10	16
2	Florida Gulf Coast Dutch Lions	7	5	1	1	14	3	+11	16
3	FC Surge	7	4	1	2	21	7	+14	14
4	Florida Krush	7	4	2	1	30	5	+25	13
5	Florida Sol FC	7	3	3	1	11	13	−2	10
6	Team Boca Blast	7	2	4	1	12	13	−1	7
7	Florida Tropics SC	7	1	5	1	4	19	−15	4
8	Puerto Rico Pride FC	7	0	7	0	6	48	−42	0

Source: 2018 WPSL Sunshine Conference standings

==== Southeast Conference ====
Pos	Team	Pld	W	L	T	GF	GA	GD	Pts
1	Chattanooga FC	8	7	1	0	16	6	+10	21
2	Memphis Lobos	8	4	4	0	14	12	+2	12
3	Nashville Rhythm	8	3	3	2	18	13	+5	11
4	Peachtree City MOBA	8	2	4	2	15	13	+2	8
5	Emerald Force	8	2	6	0	7	26	−19	6

Source: 2018 WPSL Southeast Conference standings

==== Gulf Conference ====
Pos	Team	Pld	W	L	T	GF	GA	GD	Pts
1	Pensacola FC	7	6	0	1	19	4	+15	19
2	Baton Rouge United	8	5	2	1	27	12	+15	16
3	Alabama FC	7	4	2	1	19	8	+11	13
4	Rangers Ladies FC	8	1	6	1	8	31	−23	4
5	MS Blues SC	8	1	7	0	7	25	−18	3

Source: 2018 WPSL Gulf Conference standings

=== West Region ===
==== Northwest Conference ====
Pos	Team	Pld	W	L	T	GF	GA	GD	Pts
1	Seattle Sounders Women	7	6	0	1	35	6	+29	19
2	OSA XF	7	5	1	1	18	8	+10	16
3	Vancouver TSS Rovers	7	3	2	2	17	19	−2	11
4	ISC Gunners FC	7	3	3	1	15	19	−4	10
5	Westside Timbers	7	2	4	1	7	15	−8	7
6	Eugene Timbers FC Azul	7	1	4	2	9	17	−8	5
7	THUSC Diamonds	6	0	6	0	6	23	−17	0

Source: 2018 WPSL Northwest Conference standings

==== Pac North Conference – Bay Area ====
Pos	Team	Pld	W	L	T	GF	GA	GD	Pts
1	Fresno FC Ladies	8	6	0	2	24	8	+16	20
2	San Francisco Nighthawks	8	6	2	0	25	10	+15	18
3	California Storm	8	5	1	2	20	10	+10	17
4	MVLA Wolves	8	5	2	1	19	12	+7	16
5	San Ramon FC	8	3	4	1	16	15	+1	10
6	Pleasanton RAGE	8	1	4	3	9	18	−9	6
7	Marin FC Alliance	8	0	6	2	7	25	−18	2
8	Primero de Mayo	8	0	7	1	5	27	−22	1

Source: 2018 WPSL Pac North Conference standings

==== Desert Division ====
Pos	Team	Pld	W	L	T	GF	GA	GD	Pts
1	Utah Red Devils	8	8	0	0	27	4	+23	24
2	Utah Arrows SC	8	5	2	1	19	11	+8	16
3	Players North Soccer Club	8	3	5	0	12	17	−5	9
4	Players SC	8	2	5	1	10	15	−5	7
5	Las Vegas Q11	8	0	6	2	7	28	−21	2

Source: 2018 WPSL Desert Division standings

==== Coastal Conference ====
Pos	Team	Pld	W	L	T	GF	GA	GD	Pts
1	Beach Futbol Club	10	6	1	3	12	8	+4	21
2	SoCal FC	10	5	1	4	19	11	+8	19
3	LA Villa	9	4	0	5	19	10	+9	17
4	Legends FC	10	4	3	3	15	11	+4	15
5	So Cal Union FC	10	4	3	3	16	10	+6	15
6	Pateadores	9	3	4	2	11	9	+2	11
7	LA Premier FC	10	2	7	1	12	21	−9	7
8	Fram Ajax	10	0	9	1	7	31	−24	1

Source: 2018 WPSL Coastal Conference standings

==== Pac South Conference ====
Pos	Team	Pld	W	L	T	GF	GA	GD	Pts
1	FC Tucson	8	5	2	1	11	7	+4	16
2	LA Galaxy San Diego	8	4	1	3	17	8	+9	15
3	Phoenix Del Sol	8	3	4	1	8	14	−6	10
4	San Diego Parceiro Ladies	8	2	5	1	10	15	−5	7
5	San Diego SeaLions	8	1	3	4	11	13	−2	7

Source: 2018 WPSL Pac South Conference standings
