= St. Charles FC =

- Full name: St. Charles Football Club
- Founded: 2020; 6 years ago
- Stadium: Lutheran High School St. Charles Football Field; St. Charles, Missouri
- Capacity: 2,000
- Head Coach: Tim Mosby (USL League Two); Deno Merrick (USL W League)
- League: USL League Two; USL W League
- 2023: ?
- Website: stc2020fc.com
Home colors	Away colors

St. Charles Football Club is an American soccer club based in St. Charles, Missouri. Beginning in the 2023 season, they compete in both USL W League and USL League Two.

== Roster ==
Note: Flags indicate national team as defined under FIFA eligibility rules; some limited exceptions apply. Players may hold more than one non-FIFA nationality.

No.	Pos.	Nation	Player
—	MF	USA	Matteo Boasso
—	DF	USA	Cameron Caldwell
—	DF	USA	Kyle Genenbacher
—	MF	GUY	Ryan Khedoo
—	MF	MAS	Wan Kuzri
—	MF	USA	Braden Seel

== Seasons ==
=== USL W League ===
As of July 21, 2024

Season	League	Division	Regular season									Playoffs	Topscorer	Ref.
Season	League	Division	P	W	D	L	GF	GA	GD	Pts.	Pos.	Playoffs	Topscorer	Ref.
2023	USL W	Valley	10	1	2	7	5	56	-51	5	5th	DNQ		
2024	USL W	Valley	10	0	0	10	2	65	-63	0	5th	DNQ		
