= Anna Haddock =

American soccer player (born 2001)

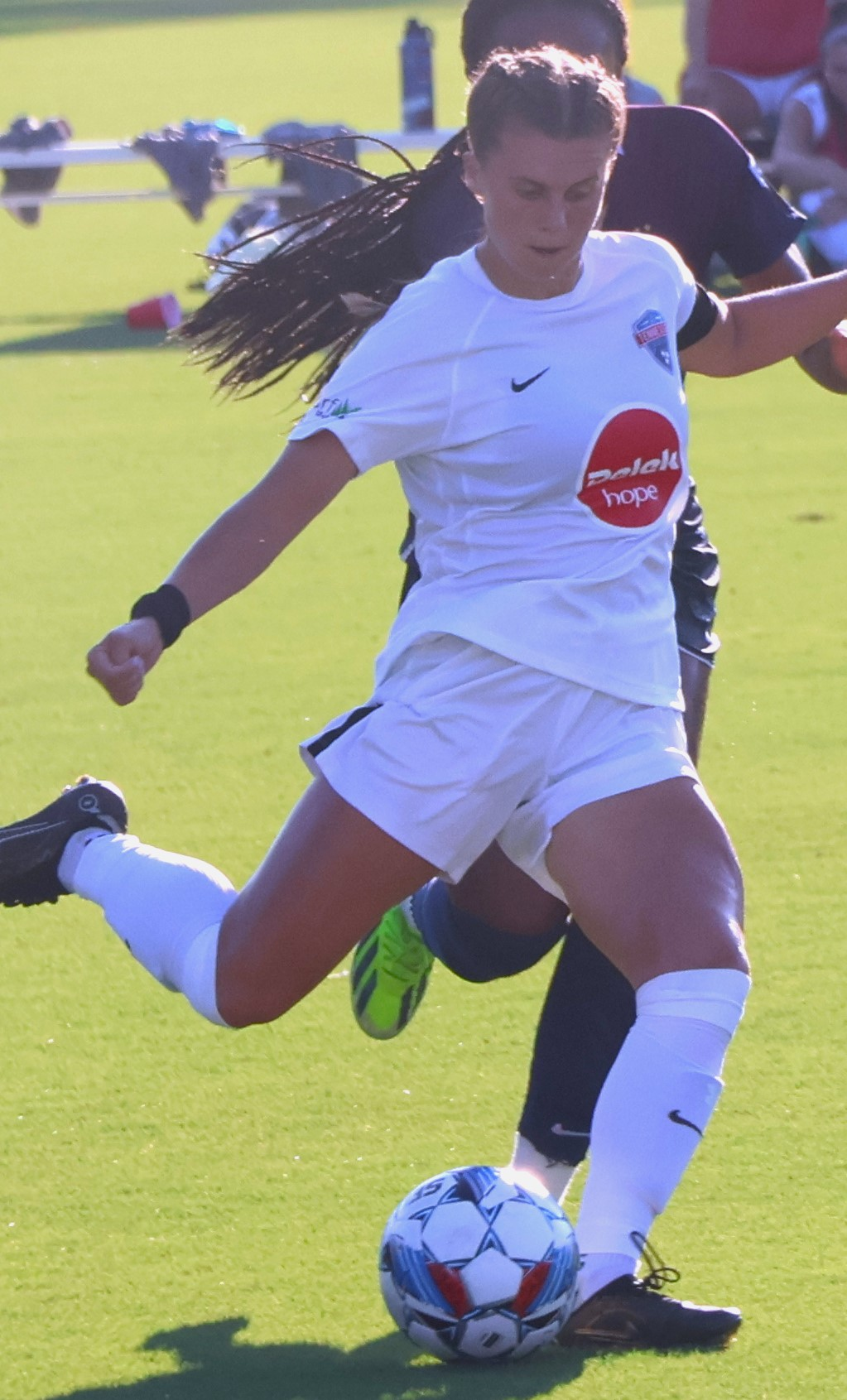
- Haddock with Tennessee SC in 2024

Personal information
- Date of birth: December 23, 2001 (age 24)
- Height: 5 ft 5 in (1.65 m)
- Position: Midfielder

Team information
- Current team: Vittsjö GIK
- Number: 4

College career
Years	Team	Apps	(Gls)
2020–2024	Auburn Tigers	97	(23)

Senior career*
Years	Team	Apps	(Gls)
2023–2024	Tennessee SC	18	(18)
2025–	Vittsjö GIK	26	(6)
- * Club domestic league appearances and goals as of November 16, 2025

Anna Haddock (born December 23, 2001) is an American professional soccer player who plays as a midfielder for Damallsvenskan club Vittsjö GIK. She played college soccer for the Auburn Tigers, setting the program record for career assists and earning second-team All-American honors in 2024.

== Early life ==
Haddock grew up in Nashville, Tennessee, one of two children born to Haynes and Dana Haddock. She began playing soccer at age three. When she was about 12, her family moved to Bowling Green, Kentucky, but she kept playing with her hometown club Tennessee SC, earning ECNL All-American honors in 2018. She attended Greenwood High School in Bowling Green, where she set school records for career goals (150) and assists (85). She was named first-team all-state four times and the Kentucky Gatorade Player of the Year twice. In her senior season, she scored 54 goals with 24 assists in 27 games as she led Greenwood to its first state championship.

== College career ==
Haddock started every game for the Auburn Tigers for five seasons from 2020 to 2024. In her freshman season, which occurred during the COVID-19 pandemic, she scored her first college goal and assisted twice in a 4–3 loss to Arkansas in the quarterfinals of the SEC tournament. She finished her freshman season with 2 goals and led the Southeastern Conference with 10 assists, being named to the SEC all-freshman team and TopDrawerSoccer second-team freshman Best XI. She played a further attacking role in her sophomore season, leading the team with 9 goals and 8 assists and being named first-team All-SEC. She assisted in a 2–1 win against South Carolina in the SEC tournament, helping reach the semifinals. Auburn qualified for the NCAA tournament but lost in the first round. In her junior season, she scored 3 goals with 6 assists in a down season for Auburn, who missed the SEC tournament for the first time in twenty years.

Haddock became one of Auburn's captains in her senior season. Out of both attacking or defensive roles, she scored 4 goals and led the team with 7 assists, earning second-team All-SEC honors. Auburn advanced to the SEC tournament quarterfinals. She returned to use her fifth year of eligibility granted by the NCAA due to the pandemic. In her graduate season, she scored 5 goals and ranked second in the nation with 13 assists, being named first-team All-SEC and second-team All-American by United Soccer Coaches. She assisted in a 4–1 first-round win against FIU in the NCAA tournament before falling to Ohio State in the second round. She left Auburn as the program's career assist record holder with 44 assists in 97 games.

While in college, Haddock also played during the summers with the WPSL's Nashville Rhythm FC in 2021 and the USL W League's Tennessee SC in 2023 and 2024. In the 2024 season, she scored 11 goals with 11 assists as she led Tennessee FC to the national semifinals and was named the USL W League Player of the Year.

== Club career ==
On January 3, 2025, Damallsvenskan club Vittsjö GIK announced that they had signed Haddock to her first professional contract on a one-year deal. She made her professional debut on March 3, starting and playing the entire match in a 7–1 loss to BK Häcken in the Swedish Cup group stage. On April 26, she scored her first professional goal to conclude a 2–2 league draw with Växjö. She made her first professional assist to Sandra Lynn, then scored the late winning goal, in a 3–2 victory over Malmö on May 24. She finished her rookie season as Vittsjö's joint top scorer with 6 goals in 26 league games and played over 2,100 minutes which was fourth on the team.

== International career ==
Haddock was called up to the United States national under-23 team to scrimmage with National Women's Soccer League teams in the 2022 preseason.

== Honors and awards ==
Individual

- Second-team All-American: 2024
- First-team All-SEC: 2021, 2024
- Second-team All-SEC: 2023
- SEC all-freshman team: 2020
- USL W League Player of the Year: 2024
