= Rochester FC =

Soccer club in Minnesota, US

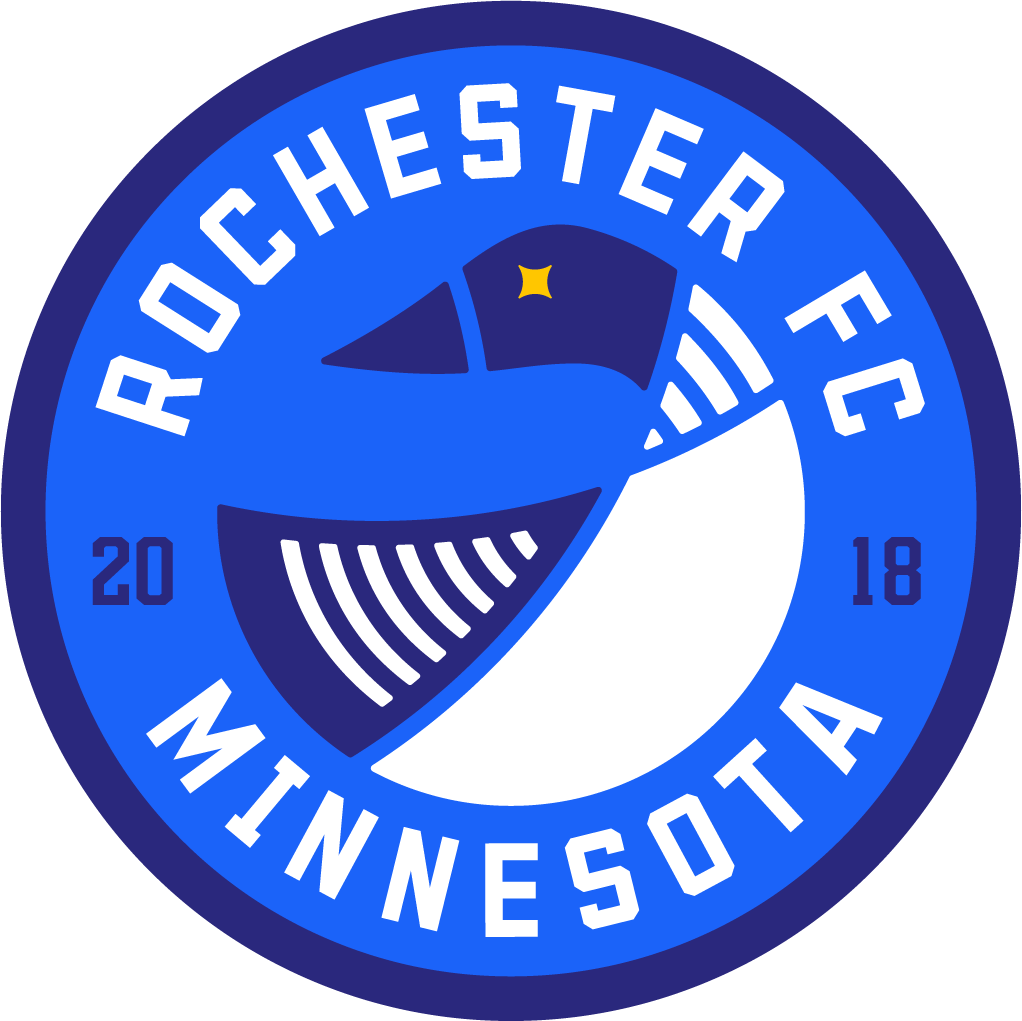
- Full name: Rochester Football Club
- Nicknames: Loons, "Big Blue"
- Founded: 2018; 8 years ago
- Stadium: Rochester Regional Stadium
- Capacity: 5,000
- Owner: Mujic, Dedic, Sierra
- President: Midhat Mujic
- Sporting Director: Muharem Dedic
- League: USL League Two, USL W League
- 2023 (Men) 2023 (Women): 5th, Deep North Division; Playoffs: DNQ 7th, Heartland Division; Playoffs: DNQ
- Website: rochester-fc.com
Home colors	Away colors

Rochester FC is a soccer club based in Rochester, Minnesota. Its men's team competes in the USL League Two Heartland Division, and its women's team competes in the USL W League Heartland Division. Rochester FC's colors are Royal Blue. Rochester FC has an Elite Development youth academy for boys and girls; the academy competes in the USL.

== History ==
Rochester FC was founded in 2018 by Midhat Mujic and Muharem Dedic. Rochester FC began competing in both USL's Deep North Conference as well as the USL W League Heartland Division as expansion teams in 2023.

== Year-by-year ==
=== Men's Team ===
Season	League											Position		
Season	Div	League	Pld	W	L	D	GF	GA	GD	Pts	PPG	Div	Playoffs	Open Cup
2023	4	USL League Two	12	4	6	2	15	25	-10	14	1.17	5th, Deep North	DNQ	did not enter
2024	4	USL League Two	12	2	1	9	9	29	-20	7	0.58	6th, Deep North	DNQ	did not enter
2025	4	USL League Two	12	7	0	5	24	16	+8	21	1.75	4th, Deep North	DNQ	did not enter
2026	4	USL League Two	12	2	0	10	8	43	-35	6	0.50	9th, Deep North	DNQ	did not enter

=== Women's Team ===
Season	League											Position	
Season	Div	League	Pld	W	L	D	GF	GA	GD	Pts	PPG	Div	Playoffs
2023	4	USL W League	12	1	11	0	6	31	-25	3	.25	7th, Heartland	DNQ
2024	4	USL W League	12	4	0	8	22	34	-12	12	1.00	5th, Heartland	DNQ
2025	4	USL W League	12	3	1	8	12	19	-7	10	0.83	4th, Heartland	DNQ
2026	4	USL W League	12	2	0	10	5	33	-28	6	0.50	8th, Heartland	DNQ

== Staff ==
- (Bosnia and Herzegovina) Midhat Mujic– President
- (Bosnia and Herzegovina) Muharem Dedic– Sporting Director
- (Bosnia and Herzegovina) Mirnes Dedic– Technical Director
- (Colombia) Rafael Sierra– Director of Public Relations
- (United States) Eric Feil– Youth Director.
- (United States) Amber Billings– Operations Manager.
- (Colombia) Sebastian Narvaez– USL 2 Head Coach
- (Somalia) Abdul Noor– UPSL Head Coach
- (Bosnia and Herzegovina) Sanel Begic– Director of Media.
- (United States) Arnav Pokhrel– Assistant Media Director.
- (Bosnia and Herzegovina) Sanel Krivdic– Assistant Youth Director.
- (Bosnia and Herzegovina) Adelisa Heldovac– Director of Merchandise.
