= AHFC Royals =

American soccer club

- Full name: Albion Hurricanes Football Club Royals
- Founded: 2017; 9 years ago
- Stadium: CRSP, Campbell Road Sports Park Houston, Texas
- Head Coach: James Clarkson USL League Two, Steve Williams USL W
- League: USL League Two & USL W League
- 2026: 3rd, Lone Star Division; Playoffs: did not qualify
- Website: ahfcroyals.com
Home colours

The AHFC Royals are an American soccer club competing in the USL League Two which is based in Houston, Texas. The Royals also field a team in the USL W League.

== Year-by-year ==
=== Men ===
Year	Division	League	Regular season	Playoffs	Open Cup
2018	4	USL PDL	3rd, Mid South	did not qualify	did not enter
2019	4	USL League Two	4th, Mid South	did not qualify	did not qualify
2020	4	USL League Two	Season cancelled due to COVID-19 pandemic		
2021	4	USL League Two	4th, Mid South	did not qualify	did not qualify
2022	4	USL League Two	5th, Lone Star	did not qualify	did not qualify
2023	4	USL League Two	1st, Lone Star	Conference Quarterfinals	did not qualify
2024	4	USL League Two	2nd, Lone Star	Conference Quarterfinals	did not qualify
2025	4	USL League Two	3rd, Lone Star	did not qualify	did not qualify
2026	4	USL League Two	3rd, Lone Star	did not qualify	did not qualify

=== Women ===
Year	Division	League	Regular season	Playoffs	Championship
2018	4	WSPL	2nd Red River South	did not qualify	did not qualify
2019	4	WSPL	1st Red River South	Runner Up Red River Conference	did not qualify
2020	4	WSPL	Season cancelled due to COVID-19 pandemic		
2021	4	WSPL	1st Red River South	no advancements due to COVID-19	
2022	4	WSPL	1st Red River South	Region Finals	did not qualify
2023	4	WSPL	1st, Texas Triangle	Regional Semifinals	did not qualify
2024	4	USLW	1st, Lone Star	Conference Semifinals	did not qualify
2025	4	USLW	2nd, Lone Star	did not qualify	did not qualify
2026	4	USLW	2nd, Lone Star	did not qualify	did not qualify

== Honors ==
Division Championships

- Men`s
  - USL League Two (1): 2023
- Women`s
  - WPSL (3): 2021, 2022, 2023
  - USLW (1): 2024
