= 2023 USL League Two season =

USL League Two
- Season: 2023
- Dates: May 6 – July 18 (Regular season)
- Champions: Ballard FC (1st Title)
- Regular Season Champions: Chicago City SC (1st Title)
- Matches: 758
- Goals: 2,708 (3.57 per match)
- Best Player: (United States) Logan Farrington Ventura County Fusion
- Top goalscorer: (United States) Logan Farrington Ventura County Fusion, (Spain) Sergio Ors Navarro Texas United (13 Goals Each)
- Best goalkeeper: (Puerto Rico) Aurie Briscoe Fort Wayne FC
- Biggest home win: TEX 22, BLG 0 (July 8)
- Biggest away win: BLG 0, TEX 11 (June 10)
- Highest scoring: TEX 22, BLG 0 (July 8)
- Longest winning run: 11 matches Chicago City SC
- Longest unbeaten run: 13 matches Ocean City Nor'easters
- Longest winless run: 14 matches Boston City FC
- Longest losing run: 11 matches Boston City FC
- All statistics correct as of July 18, 2023.

The 2023 USL League Two season was the 28th season of USL League Two, a semi-professional soccer league in the United States and Canada.

The regular season began on May 6 and ended on July 18. 122 teams participated in this season. Two additional divisions were added to the league this season, Nor Cal and South Florida, bringing the total to 18.

== Team changes ==
=== New teams ===
- Academica SC (Turlock, CA)
- Arizona Arsenal SC (Mesa, AZ)
- Bavarian United SC (Milwaukee, WI)
- Boulder County United (Lafayette, CO)
- Brevard SC (Melbourne, FL)
- Capo FC (San Juan Capistrano, CA)
- FC Buffalo
- FC Carolinas (Waxhaws, NC)
- Ironbound SC (Newark, NJ)
- Monterey Bay FC 2 (Salinas, CA)
- North Alabama SC (Huntsville, AL)
- Redlands FC (Redlands, CA)
- RKC Third Coast (Racine & Kenosha, WI)
- Rochester FC (Rochester, MN)
- St. Charles FC (St. Charles, MO)
- Sarasota Paradise (Sarasota, FL)
- St. Petersburg FC (St. Petersburg, FL)
- United PDX (Portland, OR)
- Virginia Marauders FC (Winchester, VA)

=== Departing teams ===
- Caledonia SC
- Central Valley Fuego FC 2
- Chicago FC United
- Commonwealth Cardinals FC
- FC Florida U23
- FC Golden State Force
- Kaw Valley FC
- One Knoxville SC (to USL League One)
- OVF Alliance
- Peachtree City MOBA
- St. Louis Lions
- Tri-Cities Otters

=== Returning teams ===
- FC Tucson (from USL League One)

=== Name changes ===
- Blackwatch Rush to Albany Rush
- East Atlanta FC to East Atlanta Dutch Lions FC
- Florida Tropics SC to Swan City SC
- Brazos Valley Cavalry FC to Twin City Toucans FC

=== On hiatus ===
- South Georgia Tormenta FC 2

=== Map ===
Locations of teams who participated in the 2023 season.
- Eastern Conference
- Central Conference
- Southern Conference
- Western Conference
- Multiple Teams

Metro areas with multiple teams:

- Boston: Boston Bolts, Boston City FC
- Charlotte: FC Carolinas, Charlotte Eagles, Charlotte Independence 2
- Denver: Colorado International Soccer Academy (CISA), Flatirons Rush SC
- Houston: AC Houston Sur, AHFC Royals, Houston FC
- Miami: FC Miami City, Miami AC, Weston FC
- New York: Cedar Stars Rush, F.A. Euro, FC Motown, Ironbound SC, Long Island Rough Riders, Manhattan SC, Morris Elite SC, New Jersey Copa SC, Westchester Flames
- Philadelphia: Philadelphia Lone Star FC, West Chester United SC
- Portland: PDX FC, United PDX
- Raleigh: North Carolina FC U23, Wake FC
- San Francisco Bay Area: Marin FC Legends, Project 51O, San Francisco City FC, San Francisco Glens SC
- Tampa: St. Petersburg FC, Tampa Bay United SC

== Standings ==
=== Eastern Conference ===
==== Northeast Division ====
Pos	Team	Pld	W	D	L	GF	GA	GD	Pts	PPG	Qualification
1	Seacoast United Phantoms	14	11	1	2	34	18	+16	34	2.43	Advance to USL League Two Playoffs
2	Western Mass Pioneers	14	10	3	1	36	9	+27	33	2.36	Advance to USL League Two Playoffs
3	Vermont Green FC	14	10	1	3	38	12	+26	31	2.21	
4	Pathfinder FC	14	5	4	5	20	23	−3	19	1.36	
5	Boston Bolts	14	3	6	5	21	20	+1	15 (Note: Boston Bolts wins the tiebreaker over Albany Rush & AC Connecticut on head-to-head record.)	1.07	
6	Albany Rush	14	4	3	7	22	29	−7	15 (Note: Albany Rush wins the tiebreaker over AC Connecticut on goal differential.)	1.07	
7	AC Connecticut	14	4	3	7	19	29	−10	15	1.07	
8	Black Rock FC	14	3	4	7	12	18	−6	13	0.93	
9	Boston City FC	14	0	1	13	8	52	−44	1	0.07	

Source: USL

==== Mid Atlantic Division ====
Pos	Team	Pld	W	D	L	GF	GA	GD	Pts	PPG	Qualification
1	Ocean City Nor'easters	14	8	5	1	28	15	+13	29	2.07	Advance to USL League Two Playoffs
2	West Chester United SC	14	8	4	2	37	21	+16	28	2.00	
3	Reading United AC	14	5	7	2	26	19	+7	22	1.57	
4	Real Central New Jersey	14	4	5	5	23	20	+3	17	1.21	
5	Philadelphia Lone Star FC	14	3	2	9	21	33	−12	11	0.79	
6	Lehigh Valley United	14	1	3	10	10	37	−27	6	0.43	

Source: USL

==== Metropolitan Division ====
Pos	Team	Pld	W	D	L	GF	GA	GD	Pts	PPG	Qualification
1	Long Island Rough Riders	14	12	1	1	44	9	+35	37	2.64	Advance to USL League Two Playoffs
2	Hudson Valley Hammers	14	10	1	3	37	18	+19	31	2.21	Advance to USL League Two Playoffs
3	Manhattan SC	14	8	3	3	29	25	+4	27	1.93	
4	New Jersey Copa FC	14	8	2	4	32	22	+10	26	1.86	
5	Cedar Stars Rush	14	7	1	6	29	22	+7	22	1.57	
6	FC Motown	14	5	4	5	41	33	+8	19	1.36	
7	Westchester Flames	14	4	4	6	25	29	−4	16	1.14	
8	Morris Elite SC	14	3	2	9	16	37	−21	11	0.79	
9	F.A. Euro	14	2	2	10	12	32	−20	8	0.57	
10	Ironbound SC	14	1	0	13	10	48	−38	3	0.21	

Source: USL

==== Chesapeake Division ====
Pos	Team	Pld	W	D	L	GF	GA	GD	Pts	PPG	Qualification
1	Lionsbridge FC	12	9	1	2	31	10	+21	28	2.33	Advance to USL League Two Playoffs
2	Northern Virginia FC	12	7	2	3	23	19	+4	23	1.92	
3	Christos FC	12	6	3	3	33	20	+13	21	1.75	
4	Virginia Beach United	12	6	1	5	13	19	−6	19	1.58	
5	Patuxent Football Athletics	12	1	3	8	10	19	−9	6	0.50	
6	Virginia Marauders FC	12	1	2	9	10	33	−23	5	0.42	

Source: USL

==== South Atlantic Division ====
Pos	Team	Pld	W	D	L	GF	GA	GD	Pts	PPG	Qualification
1	North Carolina Fusion U23	14	10	2	2	32	12	+20	32	2.29	Advance to USL League Two Playoffs
2	Charlotte Eagles	14	9	3	2	38	21	+17	30	2.14	Advance to USL League Two Playoffs
3	FC Carolinas	14	5	4	5	25	22	+3	19 (Note: FC Carolinas wins the tiebreaker over West Virginia United on goal differential.)	1.36	
4	West Virginia United	14	4	7	3	25	26	−1	19	1.36	
5	Wake FC	14	5	3	6	27	25	+2	18	1.29	
6	Tobacco Road FC	14	5	2	7	27	28	−1	17 (Note: Tobacco Road FC wins the tiebreaker over North Carolina FC U23 on head-to-head record.)	1.21	
7	North Carolina FC U23	14	5	2	7	22	29	−7	17	1.21	
8	Charlotte Independence 2	14	1	1	12	15	48	−33	4	0.29	

Source: USL

=== Central Conference ===
==== Great Lakes Division ====
Pos	Team	Pld	W	D	L	GF	GA	GD	Pts	PPG	Qualification
1	Flint City Bucks	12	10	1	1	29	9	+20	31	2.58	Advance to USL League Two Playoffs
2	AFC Ann Arbor	12	6	1	5	24	15	+9	19	1.58	Advance to USL League Two Playoffs
3	Oakland County FC	12	5	3	4	23	22	+1	18	1.50	
4	Lansing City Football	12	4	4	4	15	21	−6	16	1.33	
5	Midwest United FC	12	4	3	5	22	18	+4	15 (Note: Midwest United FC wins the tiebreaker over Kalamazoo FC on head-to-head record.)	1.25	
6	Kalamazoo FC	12	4	3	5	26	29	−3	15	1.25	
7	South Bend Lions	12	0	3	9	8	33	−25	3	0.25	

Source: USL

==== Heartland Division ====
Pos	Team	Pld	W	D	L	GF	GA	GD	Pts	PPG	Qualification
1	Chicago City SC (R)	12	11	0	1	36	9	+27	33	2.75	Advance to USL League Two Playoffs
2	Des Moines Menace	12	10	0	2	42	11	+31	30	2.50	Advance to USL League Two Playoffs
3	Peoria City	12	6	0	6	27	17	+10	18 (Note: Peoria City wins the tiebreaker over St. Charles FC on goal differential.)	1.50	
4	St. Charles FC	12	6	0	6	23	31	−8	18	1.50	
5	FC Wichita	12	4	0	8	22	28	−6	12	1.00	
6	Chicago Dutch Lions	12	3	0	9	12	35	−23	9	0.75	
7	Springfield Athletic SC	12	2	0	10	9	40	−31	6	0.50	

Source: USL
(R) Regular Season Champions

==== Valley Division ====
Pos	Team	Pld	W	D	L	GF	GA	GD	Pts	PPG	Qualification
1	Fort Wayne FC	12	10	2	0	31	3	+28	32	2.67	Advance to USL League Two Playoffs
2	Cleveland Force SC	12	5	4	3	27	18	+9	19 (Note: Cleveland Force SC wins the tiebreaker over Toledo Villa FC on goal differential.)	1.58	Advance to USL League Two Playoffs
3	Toledo Villa FC	12	5	4	3	21	19	+2	19	1.58	
4	Kings Hammer FC	11	2	4	5	12	17	−5	10	0.91	
5	Dayton Dutch Lions	12	2	3	7	11	24	−13	9	0.75	
6	FC Buffalo	11	1	3	7	11	32	−21	6	0.55	

Source: USL

==== Deep North Division ====
Pos	Team	Pld	W	D	L	GF	GA	GD	Pts	PPG	Qualification
1	Thunder Bay Chill	12	9	2	1	29	9	+20	29	2.42	Advance to USL League Two Playoffs
2	RKC Third Coast	12	8	1	3	35	20	+15	25	2.08	Advance to USL League Two Playoffs
3	FC Manitoba	12	5	3	4	22	16	+6	18	1.50	
4	St. Croix SC	12	5	1	6	16	22	−6	16	1.33	
5	Rochester FC	12	4	2	6	15	25	−10	14	1.17	
6	Minneapolis City SC	12	3	3	6	17	26	−9	12	1.00	
7	Bavarian United SC	12	1	2	9	14	30	−16	5	0.42	

Source: USL

=== Southern Conference ===
==== South Central Division ====
Pos	Team	Pld	W	D	L	GF	GA	GD	Pts	PPG	Qualification
1	Asheville City SC	12	10	1	1	36	9	+27	31 (Note: Asheville City SC wins the tiebreaker over SC United Bantams on goal differential.)	2.58	Advance to USL League Two Playoffs
2	SC United Bantams	12	10	1	1	27	8	+19	31	2.58	Advance to USL League Two Playoffs
3	East Atlanta Dutch Lions	12	6	2	4	19	15	+4	20	1.67	
4	Dalton Red Wolves	12	4	1	7	18	14	+4	13 (Note: Dalton Red Wolves wins the tiebreaker over Tennessee SC on head-to-head record.)	1.08	
5	Tennessee SC	12	3	4	5	14	16	−2	13	1.08	
6	Southern Soccer Academy Kings	12	4	0	8	17	19	−2	12	1.00	
7	North Alabama SC	12	0	1	11	4	54	−50	1	0.08	

Source: USL

==== Southeast Division ====
Pos	Team	Pld	W	D	L	GF	GA	GD	Pts	PPG	Qualification
1	The Villages SC	12	8	3	1	24	7	+17	27	2.25	Advance to USL League Two Playoffs
2	NONA FC	12	8	2	2	30	7	+23	26	2.17	Advance to USL League Two Playoffs
3	Florida Elite SA	12	6	3	3	19	10	+9	21	1.75	
4	Tampa Bay United	12	3	2	7	14	19	−5	11 (Note: Tampa Bay United wins the tiebreaker over Brevard SC on goal differential.)	0.92	
5	Brevard SC	12	3	2	7	17	32	−15	11	0.92	
6	Swan City SC	12	1	2	9	9	38	−29	5	0.42	

Source: USL

==== South Florida Division ====
Pos	Team	Pld	W	D	L	GF	GA	GD	Pts	PPG	Qualification
1	Weston FC	12	7	2	3	14	11	+3	23	1.92	Advance to USL League Two Playoffs
2	Miami AC	12	6	3	3	17	9	+8	21	1.75	
3	FC Miami City	12	5	4	3	16	13	+3	19	1.58	
4	Sarasota Paradise	12	5	2	5	18	14	+4	17	1.42	
5	St. Petersburg FC	12	4	3	5	22	21	+1	15	1.25	
6	Altitude Rush	12	1	2	9	13	32	−19	5	0.42	

Source: USL

==== Mid South Division ====
Pos	Team	Pld	W	D	L	GF	GA	GD	Pts	PPG	Qualification
1	Texas United	12	10	2	0	72	5	+67	32	2.67	Advance to USL League Two Playoffs
2	Little Rock Rangers	12	8	2	2	42	7	+35	26	2.17	Advance to USL League Two Playoffs
3	Louisiana Krewe FC	12	6	1	5	26	15	+11	19	1.58	
4	Mississippi Brilla	12	5	2	5	20	27	−7	17	1.42	
5	LA Parish AC	12	2	0	10	10	33	−23	6	0.50	
6	Blue Goose SC	12	1	1	10	4	87	−83	4	0.33	

Source: USL

==== Lone Star Division ====
Pos	Team	Pld	W	D	L	GF	GA	GD	Pts	PPG	Qualification
1	AHFC Royals	12	10	1	1	33	11	+22	31	2.58	Advance to USL League Two Playoffs
2	Twin City Toucans FC	12	7	3	2	37	12	+25	24	2.00	
3	Corpus Christi FC	12	5	3	4	30	21	+9	18	1.50	
4	AC Houston Sur	12	4	1	7	14	18	−4	13	1.08	
5	Houston FC	12	3	3	6	13	21	−8	12	1.00	
6	Round Rock SC	12	1	1	10	7	51	−44	4	0.33	

Source: USL

=== Western Conference ===
==== Mountain Division ====
Pos	Team	Pld	W	D	L	GF	GA	GD	Pts	PPG	Qualification
1	Park City Red Wolves	10	7	3	0	18	7	+11	24	2.40	Advance to USL League Two Playoffs
2	New Mexico United U23	10	6	0	4	17	14	+3	18	1.80	Advance to USL League Two Playoffs
3	Boulder County United	10	4	3	3	17	18	−1	15	1.50	
4	Salt City SC	10	3	3	4	18	15	+3	12 (Note: Salt City SC wins the tiebreaker over Flatirons Rush SC on goal differential.)	1.20	
5	Flatirons Rush SC	10	4	0	6	15	13	+2	12	1.20	
6	CISA	10	1	1	8	6	24	−18	4	0.40	

Source: USL

==== Northwest Division ====
Pos	Team	Pld	W	D	L	GF	GA	GD	Pts	PPG	Qualification
1	Ballard FC	12	10	1	1	41	13	+28	31	2.58	Advance to USL League Two Playoffs
2	Oly Town FC	12	6	2	4	23	24	−1	20	1.67	Advance to USL League Two Playoffs
3	United PDX	12	5	1	6	26	26	0	16 (Note: United PDX wins the tiebreaker over Capital FC Atletico on goal differential.)	1.33	
4	Capital FC Atletico	12	5	1	6	21	28	−7	16	1.33	
5	Lane United FC	12	3	4	5	21	19	+2	13	1.08	
6	PDX FC	12	1	3	8	12	34	−22	6	0.50	

Source: USL

==== Nor Cal Division ====
Pos	Team	Pld	W	D	L	GF	GA	GD	Pts	PPG	Qualification
1	Monterey Bay FC 2	12	10	1	1	32	12	+20	31	2.58	Advance to USL League Two Playoffs
2	San Francisco Glens SC	12	9	1	2	25	11	+14	28	2.33	Advance to USL League Two Playoffs
3	Project 51O	12	5	0	7	19	23	−4	15 (Note: Project 51O wins the tiebreaker over Marin FC Legends on total wins.)	1.25	
4	Marin FC Legends	12	4	3	5	20	24	−4	15	1.25	
5	San Francisco City FC	12	4	2	6	18	19	−1	14	1.17	
6	Academica SC	12	4	1	7	21	26	−5	13	1.08	
7	Davis Legacy SC	12	1	2	9	15	35	−20	5	0.42	

Source: USL

==== Southwest Division ====
Pos	Team	Pld	W	D	L	GF	GA	GD	Pts	PPG	Qualification
1	Redlands FC	12	8	2	2	22	13	+9	26	2.17	Advance to USL League Two Playoffs
2	Ventura County Fusion	12	8	1	3	33	14	+19	25 (Note: Ventura County Fusion wins the tiebreaker over FC Tucson on head-to-head record.)	2.08	Advance to USL League Two Playoffs
3	FC Tucson	12	7	4	1	30	14	+16	25	2.08	
4	Southern California Seahorses	12	4	1	7	19	21	−2	13	1.08	
5	Arizona Arsenal SC	12	2	2	8	14	28	−14	8	0.67	
6	Capo FC	12	1	2	9	12	40	−28	5	0.42	

Source: USL

== Playoffs ==
=== Bracket ===
Conference Quarterfinals	Conference Semifinals
North Carolina Fusion U23	2
Western Mass Pioneers	1
North Carolina Fusion U23	1
Lionsbridge FC	3
Lionsbridge FC	1
Charlotte Eagles	0
Eastern Conference
Seacoast United Phantoms	1
Hudson Valley Hammers	2
Hudson Valley Hammers	1
Ocean City Nor'easters	2
Long Island Rough Riders	1
Ocean City Nor'easters	2
The Villages SC	2
SC United Bantams	1
The Villages SC	1
Asheville City SC	0
Asheville City SC	4
Weston FC	1
Southern Conference
Texas United (p)	1 (9)
NONA FC	1 (8)
Texas United	0
Little Rock Rangers	2
Little Rock Rangers	2
AHFC Royals	0
Thunder Bay Chill (a.e.t.)	5
AFC Ann Arbor	3
Thunder Bay Chill	2
Des Moines Menace (a.e.t.)	3
Des Moines Menace	3
RKC Third Coast	1
Central Conference
Chicago City SC	5
Cleveland Force SC	1
Chicago City SC	0
Flint City Bucks	2
Fort Wayne FC	2
Flint City Bucks (a.e.t.)	3
Park City Red Wolves	0
Oly Town FC	4
Oly Town FC	0
Ballard FC	3
Ballard FC	3
New Mexico United U23	0
Western Conference
Redlands FC	1
San Francisco Glens	2
San Francisco Glens	1
Ventura County Fusion	4
Ventura County Fusion	1
Monterey Bay FC 2	0

Conference Finals
Lionsbridge FC (a.e.t.)	4
Ocean City Nor'easters	2
The Villages SC (p)	1 (5)
Little Rock Rangers	1 (3)
Des Moines Menace	0
Flint City Bucks	2
Ballard FC (a.e.t.)	4
Ventura County Fusion	3

National Semifinals
Lionsbridge FC (p)	1 (5)
The Villages SC	1 (3)
Flint City Bucks	0
Ballard FC	1

National Final
Lionsbridge FC	1
Ballard FC	2

=== Eastern Conference ===
July 21, 2023 Conference Quarterfinals	Seacoast United Phantoms	1–2	Hudson Valley Hammers	Mitchel Athletic Complex; Uniondale, New York
4:00 PM EDT	Barry (yellow card) 44'; Musu 62'	Report	Epitime 11'; Rojek (yellow card) 30'; Zakowski 58'; Heanue (yellow card) 74'	Referee: Genti Holovic

July 21, 2023 Conference Quarterfinals	North Carolina Fusion U23	2–1	Western Mass Pioneers	TowneBank Stadium; Newport News, Virginia
5:00 PM EDT	Santos 2'; Layton (yellow card) 23'; Forster (yellow card) 37'; Estencio 45+5'; Cases (yellow card) 77'	Report	Pacheco (yellow card) 43'; Albo (yellow card) 45'; (yellow card) 65'; Hughes 76'; Rose (yellow card) 63' (yellow-red card) 85'; Molinari (yellow card) 90'	Referee: David Elliott

July 21, 2023 Conference Quarterfinals	Long Island Rough Riders	1–2	Ocean City Nor'easters	Mitchel Athletic Complex; Uniondale, New York
7:00 PM EDT	Sharifi 21'; Bowen (yellow card) 78'; Fitzgerald (yellow card) 81'; Dang (yellow card) 90'; Kocevski (yellow card) 90'	Report	Jones 4' (yellow card) 47'; Flynn (yellow card) 42'; Kawahara (yellow card) 55'; Becher (yellow card) 79'; Sarkos 83'; Camerlengo (yellow card) 86'; Arlotti (yellow card) 90'	Referee: Kevin Jessup Jr

July 21, 2023 Conference Quarterfinals	Lionsbridge FC	1–0	Charlotte Eagles	TowneBank Stadium; Newport News, Virginia
7:30 PM EDT	Materazzi (yellow card) 50'; Chisolm 52'; Hogan (yellow card) 61'; Rowe (yellow card) 77'	Report	John (yellow card) 69'	Referee: Otto Leon

July 23, 2023 Conference Semifinal	Ocean City Nor'easters	2–1	Hudson Valley Hammers	Mitchel Athletic Complex; Uniondale, New York
2:00 PM EDT	Russell (yellow card) 27'; Pariano 42' (pen.), 90+2' (pen.); Davis (yellow card) 74'; Veltri (yellow card) 87'	Report	Zielonka 54'; Wyant II (yellow card) 88'; Epitime (yellow card) 90'	Referee: Sean Lyons

July 23, 2023 Conference Semifinal	Lionsbridge FC	3–1	North Carolina Fusion U23	TowneBank Stadium; Newport News, Virginia
7:00 PM EDT	Bennett 5' (yellow card) 32'; Hatley 11', 22'; Chisolm (yellow card) 41' (yellow-red card) 56'; Rowe (yellow card) 84'; Fay (yellow card) 90+5'	Report	O'Gara 45+4'; Layton (red card) 56'; Williams (yellow card) 69'	Referee: Izzy Campos

July 28, 2023 Conference Final	Lionsbridge FC	4–2 (a.e.t.)	Ocean City Nor'easters	TowneBank Stadium; Newport News, Virginia
11:00 PM EDT	Materazzi (yellow card) 17'; Kirkwood 31' (yellow card) 61'; Hatley 34'; Chisolm (yellow card) 70'; Hall 95'; Blondel 111'		Veltri 6'; Pariano 17'; Kawahara (yellow card) 52'; Russell (yellow card) 98'	Referee: Nick Karnovsky

=== Southern Conference ===
July 21, 2023 Conference Quarterfinals	The Villages SC	2–1	SC United Bantams	Greenwood Field; Asheville, North Carolina
4:00 PM EDT	Mauro 27', 57'; Ferreira (yellow card) 74'	Report	Sumner (yellow card) 29'; Dymond (yellow card) 30'; Jenkinson (yellow card) 74'; Kushima 90+1'	Referee: Joshua Lampkins

July 21, 2023 Conference Quarterfinals	Texas United	1–1 (a.e.t.) (9–8 p)	NONA FC	War Memorial Stadium; Little Rock, Arkansas
4:00 PM CDT	Medina 15'; Estrada-Avila (red card) 101'	Report	Junior (yellow card) 8'; Barbosa (yellow card) 11'; Rodrigues (yellow card) 75'; Soares (yellow card) 34' (yellow-red card) 75'; Fernandes (yellow card) 77'; Pannholzer 55'	Referee: Andrew Musashe
	Penalties
	Navarro (penalty scored); Boneau (penalty missed); Coste (penalty scored); Renteria (penalty scored); Kurija (penalty scored); Voelker (penalty scored); Badawiya (penalty scored); Dyson (penalty scored); Ka (penalty scored); Singh (penalty scored)		(penalty scored) Pereira; (penalty scored) Sangwa; (penalty missed) Koliniatis; (penalty scored) Nygaard; (penalty scored) Ramos; (penalty scored) Drey; (penalty scored) Pannholzer; (penalty scored) Camacho; (penalty scored) Lopez; (penalty missed) Hunter

July 21, 2023 Conference Quarterfinals	Asheville City SC	4–1	Weston FC	Greenwood Field; Asheville, North Carolina
7:30 PM EDT	Carlson 10', 84' (pen.); Vatne 37'; Richards (yellow card) 68' (goal) 79'	Report	Fajardo (yellow card) 42'; Cates 45+1'; Han (yellow card) 75'	Attendance: 1,137; Referee: Josiah Parke

July 21, 2023 Conference Quarterfinals	Little Rock Rangers	2–0	AHFC Royals	War Memorial Stadium; Little Rock, Arkansas
7:30 PM CDT	Corvino 14'; Pisaneschi (yellow card) 17'; Phillip 33'; Panfino (yellow card) 50'; Garvey (yellow card) 89'; Wroblewski (yellow card) 90'	Report	Bernard-Le (yellow card) 55'	Attendance: 7,101; Referee: Albert Kyei-Mensah

July 23, 2023 Conference Semifinal	Asheville City SC	0–1	The Villages SC	Greenwood Field; Asheville, North Carolina
7:30 PM EDT	Carlson (yellow card) 59'; Lavenant (yellow card) 65'; Gonzalez (yellow card) 71' (yellow-red card) 90+'; Huerman (yellow card) 76'; Ledoux (yellow card) 85'; Dotte (yellow card) 90+'	Report	Luro (yellow card) 43'; Ferreira 50'; Arrude (yellow card) 57'; Mauro (yellow card) 69'; Andrade (yellow card) 83'; Adrian (yellow card) 90'	Referee: Tyler Buchman

July 23, 2023 Conference Semifinal	Little Rock Rangers	2–0	Texas United	War Memorial Stadium; Little Rock, Arkansas
7:00 PM CDT	Juarista 19'; Beltran (yellow card) 28'; Campisi 42'; Candal (yellow card) 56'; Wróblewski (yellow card) 77'; Hardin (yellow card) 90'	Report	Reyes (red card) 90'	Attendance: 7,723; Referee: Jose Lara

July 28, 2023 Conference Final	The Villages SC	1–1 (a.e.t.) (5–3 p)	Little Rock Rangers	TowneBank Stadium; Newport News, Virginia
4:00 PM CDT	Luro (yellow card) 45'; Ferreira 76'; Muench (yellow card) 90'; Ribeiro (yellow card) 100'; Lopes (yellow card) 105'	Report	Blake 90+7'	Referee: Andrew Strasberg
	Penalties
	Mauro (penalty scored); Muench (penalty scored); Lukasik (penalty scored); Santos (penalty scored); Andrade (penalty scored)		(penalty missed) Sibanda; (penalty scored) Campisi; (penalty scored) Zwane; (penalty scored) Uneo

=== Central Conference ===
July 21, 2023 Conference Quarterfinals	Chicago City SC	5–1	Cleveland Force SC	Bishop John M. D'Arcy Stadium; Fort Wayne, Indiana
4:00 PM EDT	Franklin 11', 51' (yellow card) 90+3'; Suddeth (yellow card) 38'; Warden 69'; Cisneros (yellow card) 83'; Anamoo 86', 90+3'	Report	Csiszar (yellow card) 85'; Valentic 87'	Referee: Ryan Birdsall

July 21, 2023 Conference Quarterfinals	Thunder Bay Chill	5–3 (a.e.t.)	AFC Ann Arbor	Valley Stadium; West Des Moines, Iowa
4:00 PM CDT	Wynn 9', 56'; Lurot (yellow card) 45'; Avellaneda 50' (pen.); Rolli (yellow card) 76'; Silva (yellow card) 90+10'; Lehr (yellow card) 105'; Kafeero 120+3'; Ananias 120+5' (pen.)	Report	Sowerby (yellow card) 34'; Hannosh 72', 90' (yellow card) 105'; Kodjo 86'	Referee: Noah Brenny

July 21, 2023 Conference Quarterfinals	Fort Wayne FC	2–3 (a.e.t.)	Flint City Bucks	Bishop John M. D'Arcy Stadium; Fort Wayne, Indiana
7:00 PM EDT	Hovius 32'; Dias (yellow card) 37'; Mihov (yellow card) 45+5'; Kumwenda (yellow card) 45+6'; Karani 65'; Parafita (yellow card) 90'; Wilson (yellow card) 120+3'	Report	Skokalook 12'; Robinson 45+2'; Ault (yellow card) 86'; Osei-Tutu (yellow card) 89'; Fock 120+3'	Referee: Shane Richards

July 21, 2023 Conference Quarterfinals	Des Moines Menace	3–1	RKC Third Coast	Valley Stadium; West Des Moines, Iowa
7:00 PM CDT	Garcia 12' (yellow card) 78'; Sagardoy (yellow card) 33'; Cupid (yellow card) 54'; Goldthorp 58' (yellow card) 90+5'; Kay (yellow card) 68'; Johnson (yellow card) 86'; Nedic (yellow card) 87'; Enzugusi 90+4'; Gameiro (yellow card) 90+5'	Report	Jimenez 80'; Reilly (yellow card) 90+2'	Attendance: 4,043; Referee: Kyle Armstrong

July 23, 2023 Conference Semifinal	Chicago City SC	0–2	Flint City Bucks	Bishop John M. D'Arcy Stadium; Fort Wayne, Indiana
6:00 PM EDT	Cisneros (yellow card) 36'; D'argento (yellow card) 90+2'	Report	Shannon (yellow card) 16'; Pickett 21'; Bacharach 45+1'; Fock (yellow card) 86'	Referee: Jarin Harrell

July 23, 2023 Conference Semifinal	Des Moines Menace	3–2 (a.e.t.)	Thunder Bay Chill	Valley Stadium; West Des Moines, Iowa
7:00 PM CDT	Pearson (yellow card) 58'; Sewell (yellow card) 59'; Nedic (yellow card) 81'; Kunga 90+1', 115' (yellow card) 115'; Enzugusi 103'; Morgan (yellow card) 108'	Report	Cutts 45+1' (yellow card) 45+2'; Tempestilli (yellow card) 61'; Sallah (yellow card) 85'; Lehr (yellow card) 90+7'; Wynne 120+3'	Attendance: 3,845; Referee: Nathan Colling

July 28, 2023 Conference Final	Flint City Bucks	2–0	Des Moines Menace	Atwood Stadium; Flint, Michigan
7:30 PM EDT	Adedokun 11'; Bacharach (yellow card) 26'; Creek 46' (o.g.)	Report	Cupid (yellow card) 11'; Kay (yellow card) 17'; Garcia (yellow card) 67'; Valor-Martinez (yellow card) 90'	Attendance: 3,500; Referee: Justin Janulewicz

=== Western Conference ===
July 21, 2023 Conference Quarterfinals	Park City Red Wolves	0–4	Oly Town FC	Interbay Stadium; Seattle, Washington
2:00 PM PDT	Lott (yellow card) 39'; Miles (yellow card) 58'	Report	Famuditimi (yellow card) 37' (goal) 39'; Miller 44'; La Luz 46'; Brunell 69'	Referee: Hanif Zarrabi-Kashani

July 21, 2023 Conference Quarterfinals	Redlands FC	1–2	San Francisco Glens SC	Dodge Stadium; Redlands, California
7:00 PM PDT	Yehya 58' (pen.) (yellow card) 90'; Mogharei (yellow card) 89'; Kibrom (red card) 90'	Report	Medina 21'; Hernandez (yellow card) 61'; Valdivia (yellow card) 80'; Johnsen (red card) 90'; Ibrahim 90+8'	Referee: Juan Hernandez

July 21, 2023 Conference Quarterfinals	Ventura County Fusion	1–0	Monterey Bay FC 2	Ventura College Sportsplex; Ventura, California
7:00 PM PDT	Alvarez (yellow card) 32'; Farrington 52'; Apolinar (yellow card) 71'	Report	Vargos-Rios (yellow card) 36'; Madrigal (yellow card) 45'; Lomeli (yellow card) 84'	Referee: Ivan De Cristofaro

July 21, 2023 Conference Quarterfinals	Ballard FC	3–0	New Mexico United U23	Interbay Stadium; Seattle, Washington
7:30 PM PDT	Korzeniowski 16', 90+5'; Robles 47'	Report		Attendance: 1,500; Referee: Jaclyn Metz

July 23, 2023 Conference Semifinal	Ballard FC	3–0	Oly Town FC	Interbay Stadium; Seattle, Washington
2:00 PM PDT	Thetsane 29'; Brisco (yellow card) 55'; Korzeniowski 72' (pen.); McGlynn 81'	Report	Russo (yellow card) 53'; Famuditimi (yellow card) 66'	Attendance: 1,500; Referee: Jordan Price

July 23, 2023 Conference Semifinal	Ventura County Fusion	4–1	San Francisco Glens SC	Ventura College Sportsplex; Ventura, California
3:00 PM PDT	Farrington 7', 63', 84' (yellow card) 85'; Alvarez (yellow card) 55'; Apolinar 88'	Report	Ibrahim (yellow card) 67'; Charalaghi (yellow card) 70'; Lo 74'; Pigott (yellow card) 81'	Referee: Juan Notario

July 28, 2023 Conference Final	Ballard FC	4–3 (a.e.t.)	Ventura County Fusion	Atwood Stadium; Flint, Michigan
3:00 PM EDT	Robles (yellow card) 47'; Burney (yellow card) 48'; Korzeniowski 82', 90' (pen.), 93'; Gaffney 102'	Report	Fofanah 7'; Cekrezi (yellow card) 42'; Ricketts (yellow card) 45+1'; Alvarez 60'; Kadono (yellow card) 89'; Lopez (yellow card) 99' (goal) 105'; Farrington (yellow card) 106'	Referee: Ryan Homik

=== National Semifinals ===
July 30, 2023	Flint City Bucks	0–1	Ballard FC	Atwood Stadium; Flint, Michigan
6:00 PM CDT	Bacharach (yellow card) 49'; Creek (yellow card) 54'; Ault (yellow card) 84'	Report	Onodera 9'; Brisco (yellow card) 25' (yellow-red card) 90+3'; Lagos (yellow card) 83'; Letherman (yellow card) 85'	Referee: Jason Cross

July 30, 2023	Lionsbridge FC	1–1 (a.e.t.) (5–3 p)	The Villages SC	TowneBank Stadium; Newport News, Virginia
7:15 PM EDT	Kirkwood (yellow card) 51'; Rowe (yellow card) 53'; Baker 68'; Hall (yellow card) 74'; Bennett (yellow card) 90+1'	Report	Ferreira (yellow card) 36'; Carrera 46'; Luro (yellow card) 61'	Referee: Adam Mitchell
	Penalties
	Materazzi (penalty scored); Fay (penalty scored); Hall (penalty scored); Bennett (penalty scored); Jennings (penalty scored)		(penalty missed) Mauro; (penalty scored) Muench; (penalty scored) Ferreira; (penalty scored) Lukasik; (penalty missed) Santos

=== USL League Two Championship Game ===
August 5, 2023
7:00 PM PDT

Ballard FC	2–1	Lionsbridge FC
Korzeniowski (yellow card) 19' (yellow-red card) 83' (goal) 23'; Letherman (yellow card) 54'; Burney (yellow card) 65'; Martin (yellow card) 79' (goal) 90+4'	Report	Kirkwood (yellow card) 28' (yellow-red card) 37'; Whalley (yellow card) 38'; Wyatt (yellow card) 45+4'; Materazzi (yellow card) 45+4'; Baker 80'

Starfire Stadium, Tukwila, Washington
Attendance: 3,416
Referee: Christopher Calderon

Championship MVP: (United States) Peter Kingston (BAL)

== Awards ==
=== Individual Awards ===
Award	Winner	Team	Reason	Ref.
Golden Boot	(United States) Logan Farrington	Ventura County Fusion	13 Goals in 11 games	
Golden Boot	(Spain) Sergio Ors Navarro	Texas United	13 Goals in 10 games	
Golden Glove	(Puerto Rico) Aurie Briscoe	Fort Wayne FC	0.43 Goals Against Average; 10 Shutouts	
Young (U20) Player of the Year	(United States) Aidan Morrison	Charlotte Independence 2	3 Goals in 4 games	
Defender of the Year	(Spain) Hugo Bacharach	Flint City Bucks	Helped with 7 shutouts	
Player of the Year	(United States) Logan Farrington	Ventura County Fusion	13 goals	
Goal of the Year	(France) Alexandre Frank	Fort Wayne FC	vs Kings Hammer FC	
Save of the Year	(Brazil) Mathias Tieppo	The Villages SC	vs Swan City SC	

Team of the Year
Player	Team	Position
(United States) Jason Smith	Park City Red Wolves	Goalkeeper
(Japan) Hosei Kijima	Sarasota Paradise	Right Back
(Spain) Hugo Bacharach	Flint City Bucks	Center Back
(United States) Reid Sproat	Fort Wayne FC	Center Back
(Lesotho) Lesia Thetsane	Ballard FC	Left Back
(United States) Nick Pariano	Ocean City Nor'easters	Midfielder
(Spain) Marc Torrellas	Chicago City SC	Midfielder
(United States) Jeorgio Kocevski	Long Island Rough Riders	Midfielder
(Portugal) Bernardo dos Santos Monteiro	Charlotte Eagles	Left Wing
(England) Eliot Goldthorp	Des Moines Menace	Right Wing
(United States) Logan Farrington	Ventura County Fusion	Striker

Divisional Players of the Year
Division	Player	Team
Eastern Conference
Chesapeake	(United States) Taylor Calheira	Christos FC
Metropolitan	(United States) Jeorgio Kocevski	Long Island Rough Riders
Mid-Atlantic	(United States) Nick Pariano	Ocean City Nor'easters
Northeast	(United States) Taig Healy	Seacoast United Phantoms
South Atlantic	(Portugal) Bernardo Dos Santos Monteiro	Charlotte Eagles
Central Conference
Deep North	(United States) Bradley Sample	Thunder Bay Chill
Great Lakes	(Spain) Hugo Bacharach	Flint City Bucks
Heartland	(England) Eliot Goldthorp	Des Moines Menace
Valley	(Ghana) Seth Antwi	Fort Wayne FC
Southern Conference
Lone Star	(United States) Jack Clarkson	AHFC Royals
Mid South	(Spain) Sergio Ors Navarro	Texas United
South Central	(France) Quentin Huerman	Asheville City SC
South Florida	(Japan) Hosei Kijima	Sarasota Paradise
Southeast	(Ecuador) Alvaro Carrero	The Villages SC
Western Conference
Mountain	(United States) Jason Smith	Park City Red Wolves
Nor Cal	(New Zealand) Max Chretien	San Francisco Glens SC
Northwest	(United States) Stas Korzeniowski	Ballard FC
Southwest	(United States) Logan Farrington	Ventura County Fusion

Notes

1. Replaces the conference all-star teams of previous seasons.

=== Team of the Month ===
Team of the Month
Month	Goalkeeper	Defenders	Midfielders	Forwards	Ref.
May	(United States) Hogan (LBR)	(England) Langan (LIR) (Germany) Weimann (NCF) (Germany) Riecke (OCN)	(Lesotho) Thetsane (BAL) (United States) Jordan (TEX) (England) Goldthorp (DMM) (Ghana) Boadi (WMP)	(United States) Yehya (RED) (United States) Farrington (VCF) (United States) Diarbian (VER)	
June	(United States) Troutman (DMM)	(United States) Miller (ASH) (United States) Sproat (FW) (Spain) Bacharach (FCB)	(Italy) Calzola (TBC) (Republic of the Congo) Banzouzi (SCU) (United States) Lopez (VCF) (Spain) Torrellas (CCS)	(United States) Linhares (STA) (United States) Korzeniowski (BAL) (Portugal) Monteiro (CHE)	

=== Weekly Awards ===
Goal of the Week
Week	Player	Club	Opponent	Ref.
1	(Spain) Pol Mur	Louisiana Krewe FC	Blue Goose SC	
2	(France) Alexandre Frank	Fort Wayne FC	Kings Hammer FC	
3	(United States) Nicholas Cenek	RKC Third Coast	Minneapolis City SC	
4	(China) Tycho Collins	Miami AC	St. Petersburg FC	
5	(Australia) Malcolm Ward	Asheville City SC	East Atlanta Dutch Lions FC	
6	(Uruguay) David Silva	Lansing City Football	Midwest United FC	
7	(Ghana) Forster Ajago	Tobacco Road FC	North Carolina FC U23	
8	(Spain) Hugo Bacharach	Flint City Bucks	Oakland County FC	
9	(Lebanon) Ali Nasser	Toledo Villa FC	FC Buffalo	
10	(United States) Sebastian Garcia Duarte	West Virginia United	Tobacco Road FC	
11	(United States) Carlos Armindariz	FC Tucson	Arizona Arsenal	

Save of the Week
1	(Spain) Johan Garibay	Davis Legacy SC	Project 51O
2	(Portugal) Arthur Hill	FC Buffalo	Cleveland Force SC
3	(United States) Karl Vernet	West Virginia United	Charlotte Eagles
4	(United States) Matheus Franca	Ironbound SC	Westchester Flames
5	(United States) Jordaine Jaeger	Toledo Villa FC	Kings Hammer FC
6	(United States) Nathan Jones	Lionsbridge FC	Christos FC
7	(United States) Jason Smith	Park City Red Wolves	Salt City SC
8	(United States) Matheus Franca	Ironbound SC	Manhattan SC
9	(Canada) Evan Barker	FC Manitoba	Rochester FC
10	(United States) Nathan Schnur	Vermont Green FC	Western Mass Pioneers
11	(United States) Willem Ficek	Lane United FC	United PDX
