= Asheville City SC =

American amateur soccer team

Asheville City
- Full name: Asheville City Soccer Club
- Founded: November 14, 2016; 9 years ago
- Stadium: Greenwood Field, UNC Asheville; Asheville, North Carolina
- Capacity: 3,000
- Chairman: Jimmy Wheeler
- Head Coach: Scott Wells (Men) & Maxi Viera (Women)
- League: USL League Two (Men); USL W League (Women)
- 2026 2026: 2nd, South Atlantic Division; Playoffs: Conference Semifinals (Men); 1st, South Central Division; Playoffs: National Semifinals (Women)
- Website: ashevillecitysc.com
Home colors	Away colors

Asheville City Soccer Club is an American amateur soccer club based in Asheville, North Carolina. Founded in 2016, the men's team plays in USL League Two, the fourth tier of the American Soccer Pyramid. The women's team was founded in 2017 and played in the Women's Premier Soccer League until joining the newly formed USL W League for the 2022 season. The team colors are blue and white.

== History ==
Asheville City SC was announced as a National Premier Soccer League expansion team on November 14, 2016. On the day of the announcement, the ownership group was announced: Chairman/CFO Jimmy Wheeler, President Ryan Kelley, General Manager Allen Bradley, Director of Revenue Management Jordan Vance, Director of Community Outreach Josh Yoakum, and Director of Communications Andrew Hunter. All members of the ownership group are Western North Carolina natives.

The same day of the announcement City SC announced that Gary Hamel was going to serve as the club's head coach. Hamel served as the head coach of the nearby Mars Hill University's men's soccer program. Hamel additionally served as an assistant coach for the Oregon State Beavers men's soccer program.

Asheville City SC also announced on its foundation date, that the club will play its home matches at Memorial Stadium in Downtown Asheville. Asheville City SC currently plays home matches at Greenwood Field on the UNC Asheville campus.

On December 5, 2016 the club announced it would compete in the East division of the Southeast Conference. On May 6, 2017, Asheville City won its first ever match in NPSL play.

On October 16, 2019 the club announced it would join USL League Two.

== Colors and badge ==
The crest was designed with four elements in minds in order to represent the city of Asheville, North Carolina. The colors in the crest a "blue haze" and white. The blue haze color represents the blue haze seen in the nearby Smoky Mountains, while the color white is the color of all colors, alluding to the spirit of inclusion of Asheville. The silhouette in the crest is of Asheville City Hall, which serves as a homage to the club's downtown location. The "AC" monogram in the logo is a reference to the sport of soccer's tradition in emblems over the last century. The "AC" stands for 'Asheville City' as well as used to recognize the city's love for the game.

== Stadium ==
Asheville City plays at Greenwood Field on the UNC Asheville campus.

== Year-by-year ==
=== Men's Team ===
Year	Division	League	Regular season	Playoffs	Open Cup
2017	4	NPSL	3rd, Southeast East Division	Conference Quarterfinals	Ineligible
2018	4	NPSL	5th, Southeast Conference	Conference Semifinals	did not qualify
2019	4	NPSL	3rd, Southeast Conference	Conference Final	did not qualify
2020	4	USL League Two	Season cancelled due to COVID-19 pandemic		
2021	4	USL League Two	4th, Deep South Division	did not qualify	did not qualify
2022	4	USL League Two	2nd, South Central Division	Conference Semifinals	did not qualify
2023	4	USL League Two	1st, South Central Division	Conference Semifinals	did not qualify
2024	4	USL League Two	1st, South Central Division	National Semifinals	1st Round: Lost 2-0 vs One Knoxville SC
2025	4	USL League Two	1st, South Central Division	Conference Quarterfinals	1st Round: Lost 0-0 vs Greenville Triumph SC in Penalties 4–3
2026	4	USL League Two	2nd, South Athlantic Division	Conference Finals	2nd Round: Lost 1–1 vs One Knoxville SC in Penalites 3–2

=== Women's Team ===
As of July 11, 2026

Year	Division	League	GP	W	L	T	GF	GA	GD	Pts	Reg. season	Playoffs	Championship
2018	4	WPSL	10	8	1	1	38	7	31	25	2nd of 8	did not qualify	did not qualify
2019	4	WPSL	8	4	4	0	18	10	8	12	2nd of 8	did not qualify	did not qualify
2020	4	WPSL	Season cancelled due to COVID-19										
2021	4	WPSL	8	7	0	1	16	5	11	22	2nd of 8	did not qualify	did not qualify
2022	4	USLW	12	3	3	6	20	18	2	15	5th of 6	did not qualify	did not qualify
2023	4	USLW	12	7	4	1	21	16	5	22	2nd of 7	did not qualify	did not qualify
2024	4	USLW	12	8	2	2	28	13	15	26	2nd of 7	Conference Finals	did not qualify
2025	4	USLW	12	11	0	1	30	9	21	34	1st of 7	Semifinals	did not qualify
2026	4	USLW	10	8	1	1	24	4	20	25	1st of 5	Semifinals	did not qualify

== 2022 Men's Roster ==
As of July 6, 2022

Note: Flags indicate national team as defined under FIFA eligibility rules; some limited exceptions apply. Players may hold more than one non-FIFA nationality.

No.	Pos.	Nation	Player
1	GK	ARG	Ryan Bilichuk
2	DF	AUS	Malcolm Ward
3	DF	USA	Caden Lawrence
4	DF	CTA	Bissafi Dotte
5	DF	NED	Dave Neijenhuis
6	DF	USA	Makel Rasheed
7	FW	FRA	Kemy Amiche
8	MF	GER	Oskar Lenz
9	DF	USA	Lucas Gonzalez
10	MF	FRA	Quentin Huerman
11	FW	AUS	Finn Ballard McBride
12	MF	SEN	Bachir Ndiaye
14	DF	USA	Steven James

No.	Pos.	Nation	Player
15	FW	GER	Luca Erhardt
16	MF	USA	Asa Blake
17	MF	USA	Clay Obara
18	DF	USA	Josiah Blanton
19	DF	USA	Lorenz Hoover
20	MF	USA	Mason Cookus
21	FW	ESP	Daniel Cerezo
22	MF	USA	Aidan O'Brien
23	MF	USA	Ryan Baer
24	GK	USA	Sean Green
25	GK	USA	Will Watson
26	MF	JPN	Kyoji Hata
27	MF	JPN	Hayuki Yamazaki
28	DF	USA	Jason Gun

== 2023 Women's Roster ==
As of October 12, 2023

Note: Flags indicate national team as defined under FIFA eligibility rules; some limited exceptions apply. Players may hold more than one non-FIFA nationality.

No.	Pos.	Nation	Player
0	GK	USA	Lexi Dooley
1	GK	USA	Sophie Hefner
2	DF	AUS	Jasmine Barry
3	MF	USA	Estella Gajarsky-Prado
4	MF	USA	Barrett Eidson
5	DF	USA	Anna Doane
7	DF	USA	Sage Branch
8	MF	USA	Azalea Mihailovich
10	FW	USA	Taylor Gardner
11	DF	GER	Sina Anger
13	MF	USA	Addie Cooper
14	MF	USA	Daysha Chaney
15	DF	GER	Julia Hüsch

No.	Pos.	Nation	Player
16	DF	USA	Ashley Macfarlane
17	DF	USA	Shae Hassig
18	MF	USA	Lizzie Ball
19	FW	USA	Kendall Powell
20	DF	USA	Emilee Nooney
21	MF	USA	Ava Bjorkman-Tracy
22	DF	USA	Jordan Schaetzly
23	MF	USA	Kaiya Boyd
24	MF	USA	Kylie Kroese
25	FW	USA	Karlee Benz
27	MF	JPN	Nao Kawasaki
28	MF	USA	Lillian Morrison
32	GK	USA	Gracie Murray

== Rivalries ==
Asheville City competes with Chattanooga FC for the "Blue Ridge Derby". Asheville City also competes in the "Carolina Clasico" with Greenville FC. Asheville City also had a brief rivalry with former South Central Division foe SC United Bantams.

== Staff ==
Position	Staff
Chairman/CFO	(United States) Jimmy Wheeler
President	(United States) Ryan Kelley
General Manager	(United States) Tim Blekicki
Director of Revenue Management	(United States) Jordan Vance
Director of Community Outreach	(United States) Allen Bradley
Director of Communications	(United States) Kristy Kepley-Steward
Head Coach	(United Kingdom) Scott Wells
Assistant Coach	(United Kingdom) Joe Barber
Assistant Coach	(United Kingdom) Matthew McArthur
Assistant Coach	(United States) Guy Campbell

Last updated: July 6, 2017
Source: Asheville City SC
