= Oakland Soul SC =

American professional soccer team

Oakland Soul
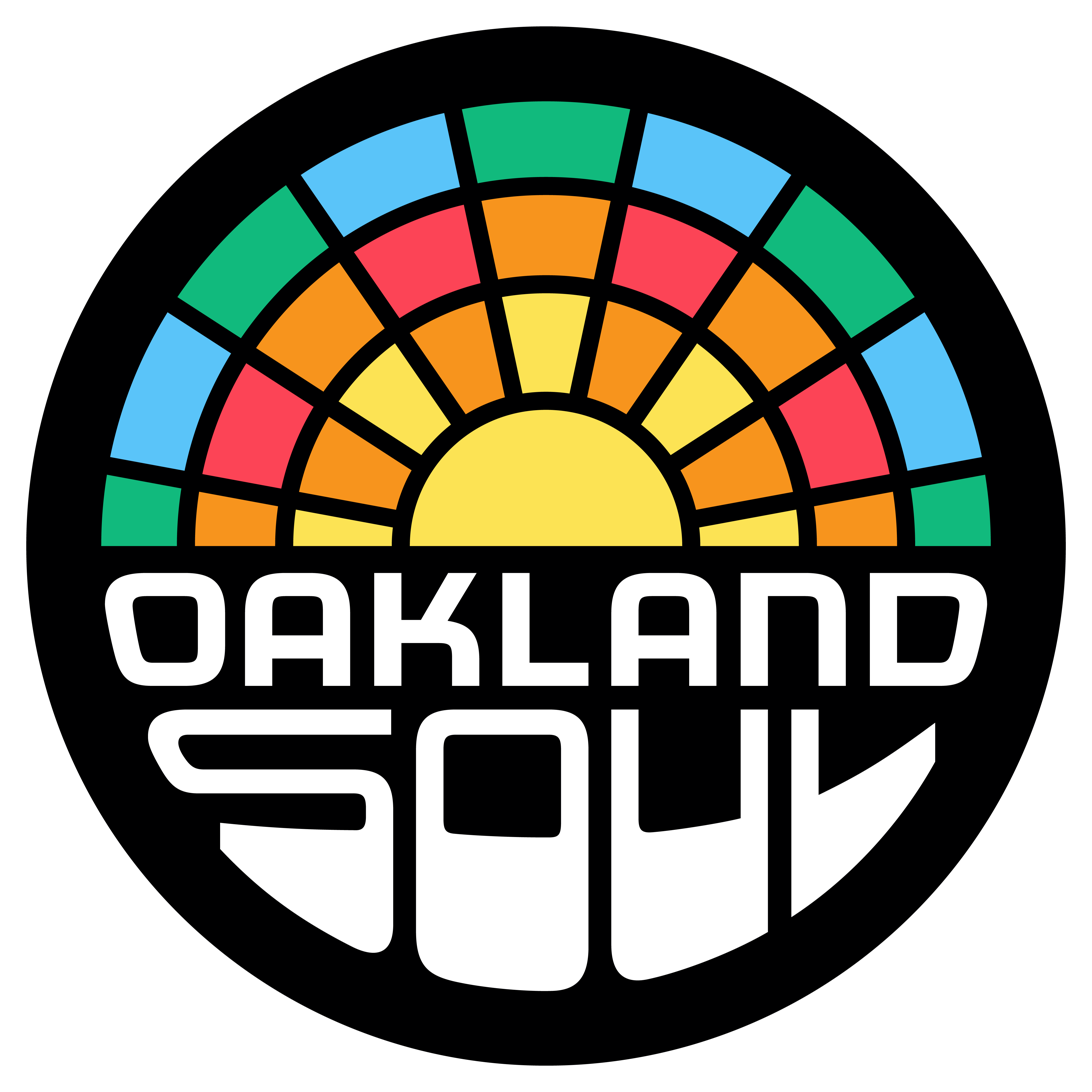
- Full name: Oakland Soul Sports Club
- Founded: May 24, 2022; 4 years ago
- Stadium: Merritt College Soccer Stadium
- Capacity: 3,451
- Owner: List: Marshawn Lynch Billie Joe Armstrong G-Eazy Jason Kidd Sway Calloway Jwalt Ruthie Bolton Alexis Gray-Lawson Antonio Davis Tyson Ross Calen Carr Josh Johnson Gary Payton II Keak da Sneak Community ownership
- Head coach: Jessica Clinton
- League: USL W League
- 2023: 2nd, Nor Cal Division; Playoffs: eliminated in Conference Semifinals
- Website: http://www.oaklandsoulsc.com/
Home colors	Away colors

Oakland Soul Sports Club is an American professional soccer team based in Oakland, California. The club was formed in 2024 as the women's team of Oakland Roots SC, and began play in the USL W League in the summer of 2023.

== History ==
On May 24, 2022, the Oakland Roots announced the formation of a women's team to play in the USL W League.

The team unveiled its crest and brand on June 23, 2023, the 50th anniversary of gender equality legislation Title IX. They finished the season 10-0-2, good for second place in the Nor Cal Division before being eliminated in the Conference Semifinals by San Francisco Glens SC.

The club plans to join the first-division USL Super League, pending construction of its new home stadium.

=== Retired Numbers ===
- 24 – Rickey Henderson - Oakland Sports Legend

== Stadium ==
The Soul plays their home matches at Merritt College in Oakland.

Along with the Roots, they plan to build a soccer-specific stadium in a parking lot on the Coliseum site.

== Seasons ==
Year	Division	League	GP	W	L	T	GF	GA	GD	Pts	Reg. season	Playoffs	Championship
2023	4	USLW	12	10	2	0	37	13	24	30	2nd of 8, NorCal Division	Conference Semifinals	did not qualify
2024	4	USLW	12	9	0	3	34	12	22	30	2nd of 8, NorCal Division	Conference Semifinals	did not qualify
2025	4	USLW	12	8	2	2	41	13	28	26	2nd of 9, NorCal Division	did not qualify	did not qualify
2026	4	USLW	10	5	2	3	19	11	8	17	3rd of 7, NorCal Division	did not qualify	did not qualify
