= Monterey Bay Sirens =

American amateur soccer team

- Full name: Monterey Bay Sirens
- Founded: January 27, 2026; 8 months ago
- Stadium: Cardinale Stadium; Seaside, California
- Capacity: 6,000
- Owner: Ray Beshoff
- President: Mike DiGiulio
- Head Coach: Laura VanWart
- League: USL W League
- 2026: 1st, Nor Cal Division; Playoffs: Conference Semi-finals
- Website: mbfcsirens.com
Home colors	Away colors	Third colors

Monterey Bay Sirens is an American women's soccer team based in Monterey County, California. The club was established on January 27, 2026, and is a member of the USL W League, a pre-professional soccer league in the American soccer league system. The Sirens began playing in 2026 as a member of the USL W League's Nor Cal division. The Sirens is the sister team of Monterey Bay FC, a professional second division men's team in the USL Championship.

== History ==
Monterey Bay FC announced the creation of an amateur women's team on January 27, 2026. Laura VanWart, the head coach of CSUMB's women's soccer team, was announced to be the club's first coach. The club began play in the USL W League in the 2026 season as a member of the NorCal division. The Sirens finished their inaugural regular season with an 8-1-1 record, clinching the NorCal division and a spot in the W League playoffs.

== Stadium ==
=== Cardinale Stadium ===
The Sirens play their games at what was Freeman Stadium on the campus of California State University, Monterey Bay. The stadium was renovated with private funds and holds 6,000 fans. Ground breaking for the stadium renovations took place on September 16, 2021, and the stadium opened on May 7, 2022. Cardinale Stadium is currently home to Monterey Bay FC affiliated teams, as well as CSU Monterey Bay's soccer teams.

== Colors & badge ==
The Sirens share the same official colors as their brother club Monterey Bay FC: Crisp Blue, Kelp Blue, Dune Yellow and White.

Announced originally under the name "Monterey Bay FC W" while branding was worked on, the team name was officially unveiled on March 28, 2026, as the Monterey Bay Sirens, named after the Greek mythological sea creature. The team's crest is unique from the men's team, featuring a siren in the badge, but uses the same colors as the men's team. The badge prominently features a siren, as well as "Monterey Bay" at the top of the shield-shaped crest.

=== Sponsorship ===
Seasons	Kit manufacturer	Shirt sponsor	Sleeve sponsor
2026–present	(Germany) Adidas	Montage Health	BLVD Residential

== Roster ==
=== Current roster ===
As of July 29, 2026

Note: Flags indicate national team as defined under FIFA eligibility rules; some limited exceptions apply. Players may hold more than one non-FIFA nationality.

No.	Pos.	Nation	Player
0	GK	USA	Alexa Malaspina
1	GK	USA	Anneliese Braun
2	FW	USA	Emma Hoang
3	MF	USA	Meredith Manley
4	MF	USA	Alexa Castaneda
5	MF	USA	Jennifer Montes
6	MF	USA	Monserrat Hernandez
7	MF	USA	Brenda Uribe
8	FW	USA	Nayeli Sandoval Gallo
9	MF	USA	Emma Yolinsky
10	MF	USA	Delilah Vega
11	MF	USA	Brianna Castleberry
12	MF	USA	Mimi Yamamoto

No.	Pos.	Nation	Player
13	MF	USA	Cynthia Ramirez
14	MF	USA	Luz Arreaga
16	FW	USA	Isabella Bertolucci
18	DF	USA	Katherine Truitt
19	DF	USA	Chloe Miller
20	DF	USA	Zoe McCabe
21	MF	USA	Cadence Walters
22	DF	USA	Audrey Reyna
24	MF	USA	Natalia Leroux
28	DF	USA	Kate Nunes
31	FW	USA	Amelia McManus
37	DF	USA	Gianna Koss
40	GK	USA	Jessica Zavale

USL Academy player
25-day contract

== Staff ==
As of July 29, 2026

Front office
Owner	Ray Beshoff
Chairman and Chief Soccer Officer	Oliver Wyss
Chief executive officer	Mike Sheehan
Vice-President, Corporate Partnerships	Carly Eggers

As of July 29, 2026

Technical staff
Head coach	Laura Vanwart
Head of Goalkeeping	Cristian Materazzi

== Record ==
Women's USL W Season records
Year	Division	League	Regular season	Playoffs
2026	4	USL W League	1st, Nor Cal	Conference semi-finals
