= Chicago City SC =

Chicago City
- Full name: Chicago City Soccer Club
- Founded: 2013; 13 years ago
- Ground: Clark Park and others
- League: USL League Two; USL W League; Midwest Premier League
- 2025: n/a
- Website: chicagocitysoccerclub.com
Home colours

Chicago City Soccer Club is an American professional youth soccer club based out of Chicago. The club is focus in youth development, with the men's team playing in USL League Two as a member of the Heartland Division and the women's team playing in the USL W League as a member of the Heartland Division. City also fields a team in the Midwest Premier League.

The club uses several venues across Chicagoland for training and home games, such as Clark Park, Bridgeview Sports Complex, Wells High School, River Park, Comed Rec Center, Montrose & Wilson, and Rauner YMCA.

== Men's team ==
=== History ===
In May 2021, USL League Two announced CITY as its newest team for the 2022 season. The team was the third from Illinois to compete in the league's Heartland Division. In early 2022 CITY also joined the Midwest Premier League, part of the United States Adult Soccer Association.

The team's second season in USL saw CITY win the Heartland Division championship for the first time with a regular season record of 11 wins and one loss. As the team with the best record that season CITY was also named the 2023 USL League Two regular season champion. In the playoffs CITY won its opening match but lost to Flint City Bucks in the conference semifinals.

CITY qualified for its first U.S. Open Cup in 2024 based on its league results from the previous season.

=== Year-by-year ===
USL League Two history
Year	Record (WDL)	Regular season	Playoffs	U.S. Open Cup
2022	7–3–4	3rd, Heartland Division	did not qualify	ineligible
2023	11–0–1	1st, Heartland Division	Conference Semifinals	did not qualify

== Women's team ==
=== History ===
CITY joined the Women's Premier Soccer League (WPSL) for the 2018 season. It remained their until the end of the end of the 2021 season.

Five months after joining League Two, CITY joined the USL W League ahead of the league's inaugural season. Like the men's team had done in USL2, the women joined USL W's Heartland Division.

=== Year-by-year ===
Year	Division	League	Record (WDL)	Regular season	Playoffs
2018	"4"	WPSL	3–2–5	4th, Northern Conference	did not qualify
2019	"4"	WPSL	4–2–3	2nd, Midwest Conference	did not qualify
2020	"4"	WPSL	Season cancelled due to COVID-19 pandemic		
2021	"4"	WPSL	1–3–6	6th, Lake Michigan Conference	no playoffs
2022	"4"	USL W League	6–1–5	4th, Heartland Division	did not qualify
2023	"4"	USL W League	8–1–3	2nd, Heartland Division	Conference Semifinals
2024	"4"	USL W League	6–1–5	3rd, Heartland Division	did not qualify

== Honors ==
=== USL League Two ===
- Regular Season
  - Champions: 2023
- Heartland Division
  - Champions: 2023
