= St. Petersburg FC =

American soccer team

- Full name: St. Petersburg Football Club
- Founded: 1 April 2023; 2 years ago
- Stadium: Johnson Field & St. Petersburg High School and Sawgrass Elementary School fields.
- League: USL League Two
- 2023: 5th, South Florida Division
- Website: https://register.stpetefootballclub.com/stpetefootballclub

St. Petersburg Football Club is a soccer club from St. Petersburg, Florida that plays in USL League Two.

== History ==
The club was founded in 2023 to play in USL League Two.

== Colors ==
The club's logo was designed to pay homage to the city of St. Petersburg and Pinellas County, featuring the colors pink to represent the Don CeSar hotel, blue to represent the Gulf of Mexico, and yellow for the sand found on many of the area's beaches. It was designed by Matthew Wolff.

== Year-by-year ==
Year	Tier	League	Regular season	Playoffs	U.S. Open Cup
2023	4	USL League Two	5th, South Florida	did not qualify	did not qualify
