= Virginia Beach City FC (women) =

- Full name: Virginia Beach City FC
- Nickname: VB City FC
- Founded: 2015; 11 years ago
- Stadium: Virginia Beach Sportsplex; Virginia Beach, VA
- Capacity: 6,000
- Owner: Steven Wagoner
- Head Coach: Kevin Smith
- League: Women's Premier Soccer League
- Website: http://www.vbcityfc.com/
Home colors	Away colors

Virginia Beach City Football Club (Women) is an American semi-professional women's soccer club based in Norfolk, Virginia playing in the Women's Premier Soccer League (WPSL) in the Colonial Conference of the East Region.

It held its inaugural season in 2015. The Women's club has been put on hiatus since 2019.

== Current roster ==
Note: Flags indicate national team as defined under FIFA eligibility rules; some limited exceptions apply. Players may hold more than one non-FIFA nationality.

No.	Pos.	Nation	Player
—			Alix Allen
—			Haley Best
—			Ysabella Bettilyon
—			Caitlin Dorsch
—			Alana Ellis
—			Kayla Emond
—			Savyon Hammond
—			Elizabeth Lillie
—			Taylor Mertz

No.	Pos.	Nation	Player
—			Grace Milligan
—			Sophie Mitchell
—			Hannah Parker
—			Sophie Reynolds
—			Emily Santana
—			Sarah Smith
—			Michelle Washburn
—			Rebecca Washburn
—			Katrina Conners

Source: 2018 Virginia Beach City FC Women's Roster

== Stadium ==
The team plays at the Virginia Beach Sportsplex which is a soccer-specific stadium built in 1999 and seats 6,000. It was the first soccer-specific stadiums built in the U.S.

== Year by Year ==
Year	League	Region	Conference	Pld	W	L	D	Pts	Pos	Playoffs
2015	WPSL	—	South Atlantic	8	4	3	1	13	3rd	-
2016	WPSL	—	Colonial	10	2	6	2	8	4th	-
2017	WPSL	East	Colonial	10	1	7	2	5	6th	-
2018	WPSL	East	Colonial	6	1	3	2	5	3rd	-

_{Source}

== Jersey Sponsors ==
Period	Kit manufacturer	Shirt sponsor
2015 – 2017	Adidas	—
2017 – present	Adidas	Nexus Street, LLC

On February 21, 2018, Virginia Beach City FC and Adidas announced an extension to their long-term partnership through 2021 making Adidas the official supplier for the club.

== See also ==
- Virginia Beach City FC
