= Tennessee SC =

American soccer team

- Full name: Tennessee Soccer Club
- Founded: 2012
- Head Coach: Andy Robertson
- League: USL League Two
- 2023: 5th, South Central Division; Playoffs: DNQ
- Website: https://www.tscusl.com/

Tennessee Soccer Club is a soccer club from Franklin, Tennessee with its men's team competing in USL League Two and the women's team competing in the USL W League.

== History ==
The club was founded in 2012 through the merger of TN Football Club and Brentwood Soccer Club and operates teams in various locations throughout the state. In 2022, the club added semi-professional teams in USL League Two and the USL W League for their senior men and women's teams respectively.

In 2023, the women's team won the USL W League South Central Division Championship.

== Year-by-year ==
=== Men ===
| Year | Level | League | Reg. season | Playoffs | U.S. Open Cup |
|---|---|---|---|---|---|
| 2022 | 4 | USL League Two | 5th, South Central | did not qualify | did not qualify |
| 2023 | 4 | USL League Two | 5th, South Central | did not qualify | did not qualify |

=== Women ===
| Year | Level | League | Reg. season | Playoffs |
|---|---|---|---|---|
| 2022 | 4 | USL W League | 5th, South Central | did not qualify |
| 2023 | 4 | USL W League | 1st, South Central | Conference Semifinals |
| 2024 | 4 | USL W League | 1st, South Central | National Semifinals |
| 2025 | 4 | USL W League | 5th, South Central | did not qualify |
