= Sporting JAX Soccer Academy =

Soccer club in St. Johns, Florida

Sporting JAX
- Full name: Sporting JAX Soccer Academy
- Founded: 2014; 12 years ago as "Florida Elite Soccer Academy"
- Stadium: Mandarin High School; Jacksonville, Florida
- League: USL League Two
- 2023: 3rd, Southeast Division; Playoffs: DNQ
- Website: sportingjaxacademy.com
| Home colors | Away colors |

Sporting JAX Soccer Academy is a soccer club headquartered in St. Johns, Florida, competing in the Southeast Division of USL League Two and USL W League.

Founded in 2014 through a merger, led by Steven Mail, of two northeastern clubs in Florida, "Florida Elite Soccer Academy" launched as a youth program. In 2018, they announced a partnership with English Premier League club Tottenham Hotspur.

They were announced as an expansion club for USL League Two to begin play in 2019. They started their debut season with a three match home winning streak. They finished their inaugural season in 4th place in the Southeast Division.

On November 25, 2024, they announced a partnership with United Soccer League club Sporting JAX.

== Year-by-year ==
| Year | Level | League | Reg. season | Playoffs | Open Cup |
|---|---|---|---|---|---|
| 2019 | 4 | USL League Two | 4th, Southeast | did not qualify | did not enter |
| 2020 | Season canceled due to COVID-19 pandemic | | | | |
| 2021 | 4 | USL League Two | 3rd, Southeast | did not qualify | did not qualify |
| 2022 | 4 | USL League Two | 4th, Southeast | did not qualify | did not qualify |
| 2023 | 4 | USL League Two | 3rd, Southeast | did not qualify | did not qualify |
