= USL W League =

Women's professional soccer league in the United States

- Organizing body: United Soccer League
- Founded: June 8, 2021; 5 years ago
- First season: 2022
- Country: United States
- Confederation: CONCACAF
- Divisions: 16 divisions in 4 conferences
- Number of clubs: 96
- Current champion(s): Salmon Bay FC (2026)
- Broadcasters: SportsEngine Play; YouTube
- Website: www.uslwleague.com
- Current: 2026 USL W League season

The USL W League (USLW) is a women's soccer league in the United States. It began play in May 2022 and follows the USL W-League, a similar league that existed from 1995 to 2015. It is currently not sanctioned by the US Soccer Federation, meaning that it does not have a position in the US soccer pyramid. As of the 2026 season, the current champions are Salmon Bay FC.

== History ==
The league was originally announced in 2021 by the United Soccer League with eight clubs, six of which would be women's sides for existing men's USL teams, and two of which would be entirely new franchises. At launch, the USL said the inaugural season would include at least 30 teams. The inaugural season began on May 6, 2022 with 44 teams across 20 states. By the 2023 season the league had grown to 65 teams, and by 2026 it had 96 teams. The growth of the league resulted in the development of a four-conference system, which was most recently (2026) divided into 15 divisions.

== Format ==
In the regular season of 10-12 games, teams play other teams within their division. Divisional standings are ordered by points won, with three points for a win, one point for a draw, and no points for a loss; if two teams are tied on points, these tiebreakers are used:

1. Head-to-head record based on total points in league games. (If more than two tied teams have played each other an unequal number of times, this tiebreaker is skipped.)
2. Total points per game (PPG) in league games.
3. Goal difference in league games. If the number of games is unequal, the average goal difference is used.
4. Goals scored in league games.
5. Total points within division. If the number of games is unequal, then point percentages (points won divided by points possible) are used.
6. Point percentage outside division in league games.
7. FIFA Fair Play – team with fewest disciplinary points per game in league games.
8. Lottery.

At the end of the regular season, the top team in each division, along with possible wild-card teams, enter the playoffs. These comprise a straightforward bracket, currently having 16 teams, with seeding based on PPG and possible adjustment made to avoid divisional rivals facing each other in early rounds. The playoffs are a single-elimination tournament culminating in the USL W Final, which determines the season's champion.

== Teams ==
=== Current teams ===
Overview of USL W League teams
| Conference | Division | Team | City | Stadium | Capacity | Founded | Joining | Head coach | Affiliate team |
|---|---|---|---|---|---|---|---|---|---|
| Eastern Conference | Chesapeake Division | Annapolis Blues FC | Annapolis, Maryland | Navy-Marine Corps Memorial Stadium | 34,000 | 2024 | 2025 | Ashly Kennedy | Annapolis Blues FC (USL2) |
| Eastern Conference | Chesapeake Division | Charlottesville Blues FC | Charlottesville, Virginia | Theodose Stadium | 5,000 | 2023 | 2024 | (England) Nick Regan | Charlottesville Blues FC (USL2) |
| Eastern Conference | Chesapeake Division | Richmond Ivy SC | Richmond, Virginia | City Stadium | 6,000 | 2023 | 2024 | (United States) Rob Ukrop | Richmond Kickers (USL1) |
| Eastern Conference | Chesapeake Division | Virginia Atlantic FC | Norfolk, Virginia | Powhatan Stadium | 2,800 | 2025 | 2025 | Zach Hanson | Virginia Beach City FC (NPSL) |
| Eastern Conference | Chesapeake Division | Virginia Beach United FC | Virginia Beach, Virginia | Virginia Beach Sportsplex | 6,000 | 2019 | 2025 | Chris Mills | Virginia Beach United FC (USL2) |
| Eastern Conference | Chesapeake Division | Virginia Development Academy | Woodbridge, Virginia | Howison Park | | 2015 | 2026 | | |
| Eastern Conference | Metropolitan Division | Cedar Stars Academy women | Teaneck, New Jersey | Capelli Sport Complex | 500 | 2021 | 2022 | vacant | Cedar Stars Rush (USL 2) |
| Eastern Conference | Metropolitan Division | Long Island Rough Riders women | Uniondale, New York | Mitchel Athletic Complex | 1,000 | 1995 | 2022 | (England) Matt Lannon | Long Island Rough Riders (USL 2) |
| Eastern Conference | Metropolitan Division | Manhattan SC women | New York, New York | Icahn Stadium | 5,000 | 2021 | 2022 | vacant | Manhattan SC (USL 2) |
| Eastern Conference | Metropolitan Division | Morris Elite SC women | Union, New Jersey | Roosevelt Stadium | 2,500 | 2021 | 2022 | (United States) Stephanie Savino | Morris Elite SC (USL 2) |
| Eastern Conference | Metropolitan Division | New Jersey Copa FC | Metuchen, New Jersey | Falcon Field | 1,500 | 2004 | 2025 | TBD | New Jersey Copa FC (USL 2) |
| Eastern Conference | Metropolitan Division | Paisley Athletic FC | Kearny, New Jersey | Harvey Field Complex | | 2021 | 2023 | vacant | |
| Eastern Conference | Mid Atlantic Division | Eagle FC women | Mechanicsburg, Pennsylvania | Mountain View High School | | 1976 | 2022 | vacant | Eagle FC |
| Eastern Conference | Mid Atlantic Division | Lancaster Inferno | Lancaster, Pennsylvania | Pucillo Field | 700 | 2008 | 2024 | Stephanie Cleaves | |
| Eastern Conference | Mid Atlantic Division | Loudoun United FC | Leesburg, Virginia | Segra Field | 5,000 | 2026 | 2026 | vacant | Loudoun United FC (USL Championship) |
| Eastern Conference | Mid Atlantic Division | Northern Virginia FC women | Leesburg, Virginia | Evergreen Sportsplex | 1,500 | 2021 | 2022 | Vacant | Northern Virginia FC (USL 2) |
| Eastern Conference | Mid Atlantic Division | Patuxent Football Athletics women | Patuxent, Maryland | Calverton School | | 2018 | 2022 | vacant | Patuxent Football Athletics (USL 2) |
| Eastern Conference | Northeast Division | AC Connecticut women | Hartford, Connecticut | Trinity Health Stadium | 5,500 | 2011 | 2022 | vacant | AC Connecticut (USL 2); Hartford Athletic (USL Championship) |
| Eastern Conference | Northeast Division | Hartford Athletic women | Hartford, Connecticut | Trinity Health Stadium | 5,500 | 2025 | 2026 | vacant | Hartford Athletic (USL Championship) |
| Eastern Conference | Northeast Division | Hudson Valley Crusaders | Newburgh, New York | Kaplan Field | 1,000 | 2021 | 2025 | Mitchell Kazanjian | |
| Eastern Conference | Northeast Division | New England Mutiny | Ludlow, Massachusetts | Lusitano Stadium | 3,000 | 1999 | 2026 | Federico Molinari | |
| Eastern Conference | Northeast Division | Vermont Green FC | Burlington, Vermont | Virtue Field | 2,500 | 2025 | 2026 | vacant | Vermont Green FC (USL League Two) |
| Central Conference | Great Forest Division | FC Buffalo | Buffalo, New York | Coyer Field | 3,000 | 2021 | 2025 | Greg Margolis | FC Buffalo (USL2) |
| Central Conference | Great Forest Division | Cleveland Force SC women | Cleveland, Ohio | DiSanto Field | 2,400 | 2018 | 2023 | vacant | Cleveland Force SC (USL 2) |
| Central Conference | Great Forest Division | Erie Sport Center | Erie, Pennsylvania | Erie Sports Center | | 2025 | 2025 | TBD | Erie (USL2) |
| Central Conference | Great Forest Division | Flower City 1872 | Rochester, New York | Rochester Community Sports Complex Stadium | 13,768 | 2023 | 2025 | Antonio La Gamba | Flower City Union (NPSL) |
| Central Conference | Great Forest Division | Pittsburgh Riveters SC | Pittsburgh, Pennsylvania | Highmark Stadium | 5,000 | 2024 | 2025 | | Pittsburgh Riverhounds SC (USL Championship) |
| Central Conference | Great Forest Division | Steel City FC | Cheswick, Pennsylvania | Founders Field | 1,500 | 2014 | 2025 | Tom 'Tommo' Ovenden | Steel City FC (USL2) |
| Central Conference | Great Lakes Division | AFC Ann Arbor women | Ann Arbor, Michigan | Hollway Field | 1,300 | 2014 | 2022 | vacant | AFC Ann Arbor (USL 2) |
| Central Conference | Great Lakes Division | Detroit City FC women | Hamtramck, Michigan | Keyworth Stadium | 7,933 | 2012 | 2022 | (United States) David Dwaihy | Detroit City FC (USL Championship) |
| Central Conference | Great Lakes Division | Kalamazoo FC women | Kalamazoo, Michigan | Soisson-Rapacz Clason Field | 2,200 | 2016 | 2022 | vacant | Kalamazoo FC (USL 2) |
| Central Conference | Great Lakes Division | Midwest United FC women | Grand Rapids, Michigan | Aquinas College | 1,500 | 2016 | 2022 | vacant | Midwest United FC (USL 2) |
| Central Conference | Great Lakes Division | Union FC Macomb | Utica, Michigan | Barnabo Field | 5,000 | 2024 | 2025 | TBD | Union FC Macomb (USL2) |
| Central Conference | Heartland Division | Edgewater Castle FC | Chicago, Illinois | Winnemac Stadium | 4,500 | 2017 | 2026 | vacant | Edgewater Castle FC (USL League Two) |
| Central Conference | Heartland Division | Minnesota Aurora FC | Eagan, Minnesota | TCO Stadium | 5,600 | 2021 | 2022 | vacant | |
| Central Conference | Heartland Division | Rally Madison FC | Madison, Wisconsin | Breese Stevens Field | 5,000 | 2025 | 2026 | Giuliano Oliviero | Forward Madison (USL League One) |
| Central Conference | Heartland Division | River Light FC women | Aurora, Illinois | Spartan Stadium | 1,150 | 2020 | 2024 | TBD | River Light FC (USL 2) |
| Central Conference | Heartland Division | RKC Third Coast women | Racine, Wisconsin | Pritchard Park Multi-Purpose Field | 1,534 | 2023 | 2023 | (United States) John Burke | RKC Third Coast (USL 2) |
| Central Conference | Heartland Division | Rochester FC women | Rochester, Minnesota | Rochester Regional Stadium | 5,000 | 2018 | 2023 | vacant | Rochester FC (USL 2) |
| Central Conference | Heartland Division | Rockford Raptors FC | Rockford, Illinois | Wedgbury Stadium | 2,500 | 1994 | 2026 | Vacant | Rockford Raptors FC (USL League Two) |
| Central Conference | Heartland Division | Sioux Falls City FC | Sioux Falls, South Dakota | Bob Young Field | 5,000 | 2022 | 2025 | TBD | |
| Central Conference | Valley Division | Dayton Dutch Lions FC | Dayton, Ohio | DOC Stadium | 3,500 | 2009 | 2025 | TBD | Dayton Dutch Lions FC (USL2) |
| Central Conference | Valley Division | Indy Eleven women | Indianapolis, Indiana | Grand Park | 1,000 | 2021 | 2022 | (United States) Paul Dolinsky | Indy Eleven (USL Championship) |
| Central Conference | Valley Division | Racing Louisville FC Academy | Louisville, Kentucky | Lynn Family Sports Vision & Training Center | | 2020 | 2022 | vacant | Racing Louisville FC (NWSL) |
| Central Conference | Valley Division | Toledo Villa FC | Toledo, Ohio | Paul Hotmer Field | 575 | 2024 | 2025 | TBD | Toledo Villa FC (USL2) |
| Southern Conference | Lone Star Division | AHFC Royals women | Houston, Texas | Campbell Road Sports Park | 1,000 | 2017 | 2024 | vacant | AHFC Royals (USL2) |
| Southern Conference | Lone Star Division | Challenge SC women | Tomball, Texas | The Woodlands Christian Academy | | 1987 | 2024 | vacant | |
| Southern Conference | Lone Star Division | Hill Country Linces | San Marcos, Texas | San Marcos Baptist Academy | | 1996 | 2026 | Vacant | Hill Country Lobos (USL League Two) |
| Southern Conference | Lone Star Division | Lonestar SC women | Austin, Texas | Beck Stadium Round Rock Multipurpose Complex | | 2004 | 2024 | vacant | Lonestar SC (USL2) |
| Southern Conference | Lone Star Division | Lonestar San Antonio | San Antonio, Texas | Benson Stadium | 6,000 | 2025 | 2025 | TBD | Lonestar SC (USL2) |
| Southern Conference | South Central Division | Asheville City SC women | Asheville, North Carolina | Greenwood Field | 3,000 | 2021 | 2022 | vacant | Asheville City SC (USL 2) |
| Southern Conference | South Central Division | Birmingham Legion WFC | Birmingham, Alabama | Dunnavant Valley Fields – Field Four | | 2023 | 2023 | vacant | Birmingham Legion FC (USL Championship) |
| Southern Conference | South Central Division | Chattanooga Red Wolves SC women | Chattanooga, Tennessee | CHI Memorial Stadium | 5,500 | 2019 | 2022 | (United States) Luke Winter | Chattanooga Red Wolves SC (USL 1) |
| Southern Conference | South Central Division | Swarm FC | Marietta, Georgia | Marathon Soccer Park | 1,000 | 2021 | 2022 | vacant | Southern Soccer Academy (USL 2) |
| Southern Conference | South Central Division | One Knoxville SC women | Knoxville, Tennessee | Covenant Health Park | 7,000 | | 2025 | | One Knoxville SC (USL 1) |
| Southern Conference | Southeast Division | Brevard SC Riptide | Melbourne, Florida | Melbourne Central Catholic High School | | 2023 | 2024 | Christofer Felber | Brevard SC (USL2) |
| Southern Conference | Southeast Division | Brooke House FC | Winter Park, Florida | Showalter Field | | 2022 | 2024 | (England) Lawrie Dudfield | Brooke House FC (USL2) |
| Southern Conference | Southeast Division | FC Miami City | Miami, Florida | Central Broward Park | 25,000 | | 2025 | | FC Miami City (USL2) |
| Southern Conference | Southeast Division | Fort Lauderdale United FC | Fort Lauderdale, Florida | Beyond Bancard Field at NSU Florida | 7,000 | 2023 | 2025 | TBD | Fort Lauderdale United FC (USL Super League) |
| Southern Conference | Southeast Division | Miami AC women | Miami, Florida | Miami Dade College | | 2021 | 2022 | vacant | Miami AC |
| Southern Conference | Southeast Division | Sporting JAX | Jacksonville, Florida | Hodges Stadium | 12,000 | | 2025 | | Sporting JAX (USL2) |
| Southern Conference | Southeast Division | TLH Reckoning | Tallahassee, Florida | Gene Cox Stadium | 5,500 | 2023 | 2024 | TBD | None |
| Southern Conference | South Atlantic Division | Carolina Ascent FC (W League) | Charlotte, North Carolina | American Legion Memorial Stadium | 10,500 | 2023 | 2024 | TBD | Carolina Ascent FC (USL Super League) |
| Southern Conference | South Atlantic Division | Charlotte Eagles women | Charlotte, North Carolina | Matthews Sportsplex | 5,000 | 2000 | 2024 | vacant | Charlotte Eagles (USL 2) |
| Southern Conference | South Atlantic Division | North Carolina Courage U23 | Cary, North Carolina | WakeMed Soccer Park | | 2022 | 2022 | vacant | North Carolina Courage (NWSL) |
| Southern Conference | South Atlantic Division | North Carolina Fusion U23 women | Browns Summit, North Carolina | Macpherson Stadium | 3,000 | 2018 | 2022 | vacant | Salem City FC (USL 2) |
| Southern Conference | South Atlantic Division | South Carolina United Bantams women | Columbia, South Carolina | Southeastern Freight Lines Soccer Center | 2,000 | 2012 | 2022 | (United States) Sandy Burris | South Carolina United Bantams (USL 2) |
| Southern Conference | South Atlantic Division | South Georgia Tormenta FC | Statesboro, Georgia | Optim Sports Medicine Field | 5,300 | 2021 | 2022 | (United States) Jim Robbins | Tormenta FC (USL 1) |
| Southern Conference | South Atlantic Division | Wake FC women | Holly Springs, North Carolina | Ting Stadium | 1,800 | 2021 | 2022 | vacant | Wake FC (USL 2) |
| Southern Conference | South Atlantic Division | Port City FC | Wilmington, North Carolina | Legion Stadium | 6,000 | 2024 | 2026 | | Port City FC (NPSL) |
| Western Conference | Mountain Division | Albion SC Colorado | Lafayette, Colorado | Peak to Peak Stadium | | 2021 | 2024 | vacant | Albion SC Boulder County (USL2) |
| Western Conference | Mountain Division | Colorado International Soccer Academy | Parker, Colorado | Penn Stadium | 5,000 | 2012 | 2024 | vacant | Colorado International Soccer Academy (USL2) |
| Western Conference | Mountain Division | Colorado Storm | Denver, Colorado | | | 1967 | 2024 | TBD | |
| Western Conference | Mountain Division | Flatirons Rush | Arvada, Colorado | Stermole Stadium | | 2019 | 2024 | vacant | Flatirons Rush (USL2) |
| Western Conference | Mountain Division | Real Colorado | Centennial, Colorado | Real Colorado Soccer Complex | | 1986 | 2026 | Vacant | Real Colorado (USL League Two) |
| Western Conference | Mountain Division | Utah United | Orem, Utah | Clyde Field | 3,000 | 2022 | 2025 | TBD | Utah United (USL2) |
| Western Conference | Nor Cal Division | California Storm (W League) | Sacramento, California | Davis Legacy Soccer Club | TBA | 2022 | 2023 | vacant | California Storm (WPSL) |
| Western Conference | Nor Cal Division | Marin FC Siren | Greenbrae, California | San Rafael High School | TBA | 2022 | 2023 | vacant | Marin FC (USL2) |
| Western Conference | Nor Cal Division | Monterey Bay Sirens | Seaside, California | Cardinale Stadium | 6,000 | 2026 | 2026 | (United States) Laura VanWart | Monterey Bay FC (USL Championship) |
| Western Conference | Nor Cal Division | Oakland Soul SC | Oakland, California | Merritt College | 3,451 | 2022 | 2023 | (United States) Jessica Clinton | Oakland Roots SC (USL Championship) |
| Western Conference | Nor Cal Division | Pleasanton RAGE | Pleasanton, California | Stanford Medicine Sports Complex | | 2022 | 2023 | vacant | |
| Western Conference | Nor Cal Division | San Juan SC | Rancho Cordova, California | Folsom Lake College | | 1978 | 2025 | TBD | San Juan SC (USL League Two) |
| Western Conference | Nor Cal Division | Stockton Cargo SC | Stockton, California | St. Mary's High School | | 2021 | 2023 | vacant | |
| Western Conference | Northwest Division | Bigfoot FC | Maple Valley, Washington | Tahoma High School | | 2024 | 2025 | TBD | Bigfoot FC (USL League Two) |
| Western Conference | Northwest Division | FC Olympia women | Olympia, Washington | Well 80 Pitch | 300 | 2021 | 2023 | vacant | FC Olympia (USL2) |
| Western Conference | Northwest Division | Portland Cherry Bombs FC | Portland, Oregon | Lents Park | | 2025 | 2026 | | Portland Bangers (USL League Two) |
| Western Conference | Northwest Division | Salmon Bay FC | Seattle, Washington | Interbay Stadium | | 2024 | 2025 | Malia Arrant | Ballard FC (USL2) |
| Western Conference | Northwest Division | Snohomish United | Snohomish, Washington | Stocker Fields | | 1989 | 2026 | | Snohomish United (USL League Two) |
| Western Conference | Northwest Division | Tacoma Galaxy | Tacoma, Washington | Bellarmine Preparatory School | | 2024 | 2024 | TBD | Tacoma Stars (USL2) |
| Western Conference | Northwest Division | West Seattle Rhodies FC | Seattle, Washington | Nino Cantu Southwest Athletic Complex | | 2024 | 2025 | | West Seattle Junction FC (USL2) |
| Western Conference | SoCal Division | AMSG FC | Huntington Beach, California | Boswell Stadium | | 2021 | 2025 | TBD | AMSG FC (USL2) |
| Western Conference | SoCal Division | Capo FC | San Juan Capistrano, California | JSerra Catholic High School | | | 2025 | TBD | Capo FC (USL2) |
| Western Conference | SoCal Division | Los Angeles SC | La Cañada Flintridge, California | Spartan Stadium | | 2019 | 2026 | | |
| Western Conference | SoCal Division | SoCal Reds FC | Irvine, California | Championship Soccer Stadium | 5,500 | 2019 | 2026 | TBD | |
| Western Conference | SoCal Division | Santa Clarita Blue Heat | Santa Clarita, California | Reese Field | | 2010 | 2025 | Carlos Marroquin | |
| Western Conference | SoCal Division | Southern California Dutch Lions FC | Carlsbad, California | La Costa Canyon High School | | 2021 | 2025 | TBD | |

=== Location map ===
USL W League clubs
Chesapeake Division; Metropolitan Division; Mid-Atlantic Division; South Atlantic Division; Great Forest Division; Great Lakes Division; Heartland Division; Valley Division; Lone Star Division; South Central Division; Southeast Division; Mountain Division; Northeast Division; Northwest Division; Nor Cal Division; SoCal Division

=== Future clubs ===
| Team | City | Stadium | Founded | Joining | Head coach | Affiliate |
|---|---|---|---|---|---|---|
| Austin Rise FC | Austin, Texas | House Park | 2022 | 2027 | TBD | |
| Fredericksburg City SC | Fredericksburg, Virginia | TBD | 2026 | 2027 | TBD | Fredericksburg City SC (USL2) |
| Maine Wildness | Portland, Maine | Fitzpatrick Stadium | 2026 | 2027 | TBD | Portland Hearts of Pine (USL1) |
| City SC San Marcos | San Marcos, California | TBD | 2011 | 2027 | TBD | |

=== Former teams ===
| Team | City | Stadium | Capacity | Founded | Joining | Last season | Affiliate | Fate |
|---|---|---|---|---|---|---|---|---|
| AC Houston Sur women | Houston, Texas | The Village School | | 2021 | 2024 | 2024 | AC Houston Sur (USL2) | |
| Academica SC women | Turlock, California | Academica Field | 600 | 2022 | 2023 | 2026 | Academica SC (USL2) | |
| Athens FC | Athens, Georgia | TBD | | 1972 | 2024 | 2024 | Athens FC (USL2) | |
| Bavarian United SC women | Milwaukee, Wisconsin | Heartland Value Fund Stadium | 2,000 | 2011 | 2023 | 2024 | Bavarian United SC (USL 2) | WPSL |
| Capital FC Atletica | Salem, Oregon | John Chambers Field | 500 | 2017 | 2023 | 2024 | Capital FC | |
| Chicago City SC women | Chicago, Illinois | ITW David Speer Academy | | 2013 | 2022 | 2024 | Chicago City SC (USL 2) | |
| Chicago Dutch Lions FC women | Lisle, Illinois | Benedictine University Stadium | 3,000 | 2020 | 2022 | 2025 | Chicago Dutch Lions FC (USL 2) | |
| Christos FC women | Baltimore, Maryland | Moose Athletic Club | | 1997 | 2022 | 2024 | Christos FC (USL 2) | |
| Fayetteville Fury | Fayetteville, North Carolina | TBD | | 2021 | 2024 | 2024 | Fayetteville Fury (NISL) | |
| Flint City AFC | Flint, Michigan | Atwood Stadium | 11,000 | 2022 | 2022 | 2024 | Flint City Bucks (USL 2) | UWS |
| Florida Elite Soccer Academy women | St. Johns, Florida | Mandarin High School Stadium | 1,000 | 2014 | 2022 | 2024 | Florida Elite Soccer Academy | |
| Green Bay Glory | Ashwaubenon, Wisconsin | Capital Credit Union Park | 3,359 | 2019 | 2022 | 2023 | | WPSL |
| Greenville Liberty SC | Greenville, South Carolina | Paladin Stadium | 10,000 | 2021 | 2022 | 2025 | Greenville Triumph SC (USL 1) | |
| Kings Hammer FC women | Cincinnati, Ohio | Bishop Brossart High School | | 2021 | 2022 | 2025 | Kings Hammer FC (USL 2) | |
| Kings Hammer FC Sun City | Sun City, Florida | | | | 2025 | 2025 | Kings Hammer FC Sun City (USL2) | |
| Lane United FC women | Eugene, Oregon | New Civic Stadium | 2,500 | 2013 | 2023 | 2025 | Lane United FC (USL2) | |
| Lexington SC women | Lexington, Kentucky | Bell Soccer Complex | 3,370 | 2022 | 2023 | 2025 | Lexington SC (USL Championship) | USLS |
| Michiana FC Lionesses | Granger, Indiana | TBD | | 2019 | 2024 | 2024 | Michiana FC Lions (USL 2) | |
| Northern Colorado Rain FC | Windsor, Colorado | TicketSmarter Stadium | 6,000 | 2023 | 2024 | 2024 | Northern Colorado Hailstorm FC (USL1) | WPSL |
| OC Sporting FC | Irvine, California | University High School | | 2025 | 2025 | 2025 | | |
| Olympic Club SC women | San Francisco, California | | | 2022 | 2023 | 2025 | Olympic Club | |
| Palm City Americanas | Palm City, Florida | Football Farm | | 2022 | 2023 | 2024 | | |
| San Antonio Athenians SC | San Antonio, Texas | Soccer Central | | 2016 | 2024 | 2025 | | |
| San Francisco Glens women | San Francisco, California | Skyline College | 1,000 | 2022 | 2023 | 2025 | San Francisco Glens (USL2) | WPSL |
| St. Charles FC women | St. Charles, Missouri | Lutheran High School | | 2020 | 2023 | 2024 | St. Charles FC (USL 2) | |
| Swan City SC women | Lakeland, Florida | Lake Myrtle Sports Complex | 1,500 | 2016 | 2023 | 2024 | Swan City SC | |
| Tampa Bay United SC women | Tampa, Florida | Tournament Sportsplex of Tampa Bay | 300 | 2011 | 2022 | 2024 | Tampa Bay United SC | |
| Tennessee SC women | Brentwood, Tennessee | Ravenwood High School | | 2012 | 2022 | 2025 | Tennessee SC (USL 2) | |
| United PDX women | Portland, Oregon | Westside Christian High School | | 2018 | 2023 | 2024 | United PDX | |
| Virginia Marauders FC women | Winchester, Virginia | Winchester Sportsplex | | 2023 | 2023 | 2026 | Virginia Marauders FC (USL 2) | |
| Westchester Flames women | New Rochelle, New York | City Park Stadium | 1,845 | 1999 | 2022 | 2024 | Westchester Flames (USL 2) | |

== Champions ==
Overview of USL W League champions
| Season | Playoff champions | Regular Season champions |
|---|---|---|
| 2022 | South Georgia Tormenta FC | Minnesota Aurora FC |
| 2023 | Indy Eleven | Minnesota Aurora FC |
| 2024 | North Carolina Courage U23 | Florida Elite SA |
| 2025 | Utah United | Sporting JAX |
| 2026 | Salmon Bay FC | Minnesota Aurora FC |

=== Finals ===
Overview of USL W League finals
| Year | Winner | Score | Runner-up | Venue | Attendance |
|---|---|---|---|---|---|
| 2022 | South Georgia Tormenta FC | 2–1 (a.e.t.) | Minnesota Aurora FC | TCO Stadium | 6,489 |
| 2023 | Indy Eleven | 2–1 (a.e.t.) | North Carolina Courage U23 | IU Michael A. Carroll Track & Soccer Stadium | 5,419 |
| 2024 | North Carolina Courage U23 | 3–2 | Colorado Storm | WRAL Soccer Park | |
| 2025 | Utah United | 4–0 | North Carolina Courage U23 | South Field - BYU | |
| 2026 | Salmon Bay FC | 1-1 (a.e.t.) (5-4 p) | Vermont Green FC | Interbay Stadium | 2,096 |

== Awards ==
| Season | MVP | Golden Boot | Golden Glove | Assist Champion | Coach of the Year | Young Player of the Year | Defensive Player of the Year |
|---|---|---|---|---|---|---|---|
| 2022 | (England) Amy Andrews (Tormenta FC) | (England) Amy Andrews (Tormenta FC) | (Puerto Rico) Sydney Martinez (Tormenta FC) | (United States) Treva Aycock (Southern Soccer Academy) | (United States) Nicole Lukic (Minnesota Aurora FC) | (Trinidad and Tobago) Christian Brathwaite (Greenville Liberty SC) | |
| 2023 | (Portugal) Nádia Gomes (San Francisco Glens SC) | (United States) Baylee DeSmit (Christos FC) | (United States) Bailey Herfurth (Tampa Bay United) | (United States) Katie Shea Collins (Tennessee SC) | (United States) Michele Krzisnik (Flint City AFC) | (United States) Mia Oliaro (North Carolina Courage U23) | |
| 2024 | (United States) Anna Haddock (Tennessee SC) | (United States) Luciana Setteducate (Long Island Rough Riders) | (United States) Gabrielle Schriver (Detroit City FC) | | (United States) Stephanie Cleaves (Lancaster Inferno) | (United States) Abby Droner (Paisley Athletic FC) | (Scotland) Georgia Brown (Florida Elite Soccer Academy) |
| 2025 | (United States) Seven Castain (Utah United) | (United States) Seven Castain (Utah United) | (United States) Olivia Geller (Sporting Club Jacksonville) | | (United States) Ashly Kennedy (Annapolis Blues FC) | (United States) Addison Halpern (Paisley Athletic FC) | (United States) Charley Boone (Minnesota Aurora FC) |
| 2026 | (United States) Ameera Hussen (Salmon Bay FC) | (United States) Kayleigh Goodrich (Long Island Rough Riders) | (United States) Taylor Fox (Minnesota Aurora FC) | | | | |

== See also ==
- Women's soccer in the United States
- National Women's Soccer League
- USL Super League
