= 2025–26 Spokane Zephyr FC season =

Spokane Zephyr FC's second season

Spokane Zephyr FC
2025–26 season
- Head coach: Josh McAllister (until Oct 7); Nicole Lukic (since Oct 7)
- Stadium: One Spokane Stadium
Home colors	Away colors

The 2025–26 Spokane Zephyr FC season was the team's second season as a professional women's soccer team in the USL Super League (USLS), one of two leagues to be in the top tier of women's soccer in the United States.

== Background ==
In the 2024–25 season, the Spokane Zephyr was one of eight clubs competing in the inaugural campaign of the USL Super League. The team had a difficult start to the season, only winning two games in the first half of the year, before finding positive results in the spring. Despite their late resurgence, the Zephyr finished the season in fifth place, missing the playoffs by one spot.

=== Offseason changes ===
Inaugural head coach Jo Johnson stepped down from her post at the end of Spokane's first season, instead opting to prioritize her family life and to pursue a collegiate coaching career. Josh McAllister, the technical director of USL Spokane, was chosen to lead the team as an interim head coach on June 19, 2025. Nicole Lukic was later named permanent head coach after four months of McAllister's regime.

During the offseason, multiple players departed from Spokane, including reigning USL Super League MVP Emina Ekić, who was sold to Lexington SC for a league-record transfer fee.

On May 20, 2026, USL Spokane announced that Zephyr FC would cease operations as a professional football team.. Spokane Zephyr FC had the longest travel distances of any team, with their nearest opponents being Dallas Trinity FC.

== Team ==
=== Coaching staff ===
As of 16 December, 2025

Spokane Zephyr FC staff
President, USL Spokane	Katie Harnetiaux
Head coach	Nicole Lukic

=== Current squad ===
As of October 9, 2025

Note: Flags indicate national team as defined under FIFA eligibility rules; some limited exceptions apply. Players may hold more than one non-FIFA nationality.

No.	Pos.	Nation	Player
0	GK	USA	Hope Hisey
1	GK	USA	Izzy Nino
2	DF	USA	Reese Tappan
3	MF	USA	Emma Jaskaniec
5	DF	USA	Sarah McCoy
6	FW	ECU	Kaira Houser
7	DF	USA	Kelsey Oyler
8	FW	USA	Lena Silano
9	MF	USA	Cameron Tucker
11	DF	USA	Shea Collins
12	MF	USA	Aryssa Mahrt (on loan from Orlando Pride)
13	MF	ARG	Sophia Braun

No.	Pos.	Nation	Player
15	DF	USA	Natalie Viggiano
16	MF	USA	Felicia Knox
17	DF	USA	Madelyn Desiano
18	DF	USA	Haley Thomas
19	FW	USA	Tori Waldeck Zierenberg
22	DF	USA	Charley Boone
23	DF	USA	Ginger Fontenot
26	MF	USA	Katie Murray
30	FW	BRA	Thais Reiss
31	GK	USA	Hailey Coll
32	MF	USA	Maggie Johnston
33	FW	USA	Ally Cook

==== Academy players ====
Note: Flags indicate national team as defined under FIFA eligibility rules; some limited exceptions apply. Players may hold more than one non-FIFA nationality.

No.	Pos.	Nation	Player
27	GK	FIJ	Aliana Vakaloloma

== Competitions ==
=== Regular season standings ===
Pos	Team	Pld	W	L	T	GF	GA	GD	Pts	Qualification
3	Carolina Ascent (Q)	28	15	7	6	39	27	+12	51	Playoffs
4	Dallas Trinity (Q)	28	11	10	7	36	40	−4	40	Playoffs
5	Spokane Zephyr (E)	28	10	9	9	34	28	+6	39	
6	DC Power (E)	28	8	11	9	34	32	+2	33	
7	Brooklyn (E)	28	6	14	8	31	44	−13	26	

Updated to match(es) played on May 16, 2026. Source: Gainbridge Super League
Rules for classification: 1) head-to-head points; 2) total goal differential; 3) total goals scored; 4) disciplinary points; 5) drawing of lots.
(E) Eliminated from Playoff contention; (Q) Qualified for Playoffs

August 23, 2025 1	Dallas Trinity FC	2–1	Spokane Zephyr FC	Dallas, Texas
	Wisner (yellow card) 45+1'; Balata 48'; Hintzen (yellow card) 56'; Thornton 70'	Report	Braun (yellow card) 13'; Cook 21'; Tucker (yellow card) 40'	Stadium: Cotton Bowl; Attendance: 2,763; Referee: Rachel Swett

August 30, 2025 2	DC Power FC	2–2	Spokane Zephyr FC	Washington, D.C.
	Colton 25'; Cummings 76'	Report	Silano 44', 45+2'	Stadium: Audi Field; Attendance: 4,842; Referee: Iryna Petrunok

September 3, 2025 3	Brooklyn FC	1–1	Spokane Zephyr FC	Brooklyn, New York
	Loving 56'; Freitas (yellow card) 86'	Report	Jaskaniec (yellow card) 84' (goal) 90+1'	Stadium: Maimonides Park; Attendance: 1,502; Referee: Danielle Chesky

September 6, 2025 4	Spokane Zephyr FC	0–1	Fort Lauderdale United FC	Spokane, Washington
	McCoy (yellow card) 44'	Report	Smith (yellow card) 3' (red card) 90+4'; Nyamekye (yellow card) 18'; Simpson 62'; Ansbrow (yellow card) 90+7'	Stadium: One Spokane Stadium; Attendance: 2,186; Referee: Shawn Tehini

September 12, 2025 5	Spokane Zephyr FC	2–0	Tampa Bay Sun FC	Spokane, Washington
	Silano 24' (yellow card) 71'; Cook 45+1'	Report	Shimkin (red card) 48'	Stadium: One Spokane Stadium; Attendance: 1,903; Referee: Kelsey Harms

September 20, 2025 6	Lexington SC	0–0	Spokane Zephyr FC	Lexington, Kentucky
	Ekić (yellow card) 12'	Report	Cook (yellow card) 17'; Knox (yellow card) 32'	Stadium: Lexington SC Stadium; Attendance: 2,003; Referee: Stephanie McFarland

September 24, 2025 7	Carolina Ascent FC	0–1	Spokane Zephyr FC	Charlotte, North Carolina
	Corbin (yellow card) 33'; Studer (yellow card) 53'; Nally (yellow card) 79'; Butler (red card) 90+2'	Report	Zierenberg 35'; Oyler (yellow card) 85'	Stadium: American Legion Memorial Stadium; Attendance: 1,836; Referee: Kaitlyn Trowbrdige

October 4, 2025 8	Spokane Zephyr FC	0–0	Lexington SC	Spokane, Washington
	Tappan (yellow card) 63'	Report	Barry (yellow card) 11'; Bourgeois (yellow card) 29'; Ekić (yellow card) 55'; Pantuso (yellow card) 60'	Stadium: One Spokane Stadium; Attendance: 1,624; Referee: Iryna Petrunok

October 12, 2025 9	Spokane Zephyr FC	2–0	Dallas Trinity FC	Spokane, Washington
	Zierenberg 60'; McCutcheon 67' (o.g.)	Report	Davison (yellow card) 70'; Wisner (yellow card) 81'	Stadium: One Spokane Stadium; Attendance: 1,373; Referee: Marie Durr

October 19, 2025 10	DC Power FC	1–1	Spokane Zephyr FC	Washington, D.C.
	Gourley 90+5'	Report	Cook 52' (pen.); Tucker (yellow card) 82'	Stadium: Audi Field; Attendance: 510; Referee: Patricia McCracken

October 30, 2025 11	Spokane Zephyr FC	1–2	Carolina Ascent FC	Washington, D.C.
	Cook 81' (pen.)	Report	Baisden 59', 68'; Harding (yellow card) 76'	Stadium: One Spokane Stadium; Attendance: 1,179; Referee: Thomas Snyder

November 9, 2025 12	Spokane Zephyr FC	0–1	Tampa Bay Sun FC	Spokane, Washington
	Fontenot (yellow card) 2'	Report	Bessette 19'; Gaillard (yellow card) 65'	Stadium: One Spokane Stadium; Attendance: 1,311; Referee: Brad Jensen

November 15, 2025 13	Spokane Zephyr FC	0–2	Dallas Trinity FC	Spokane, Washington
		Report	Strawn 29'; Ubogagu (yellow card) 59'; Moore 90+3'	Stadium: One Spokane Stadium; Attendance: 1,463; Referee: Mark Verso

November 22, 2025 14	Brooklyn FC	1–0	Spokane Zephyr FC	Brooklyn, New York
	Garziano (yellow card) 19'; Cudjoe (yellow card) 32'; Freitas (yellow card) 72'; Lewis 74'	Report		Stadium: Maimonides Park; Attendance: 923; Referee: Atahan Yaya

December 6, 2025 15	Lexington SC	1–1	Spokane Zephyr FC	Lexington, Kentucky
	McCain 89' (pen.)	Report	Jaskaniec 61'; Braun (yellow card) 77'	Stadium: Lexington SC Stadium; Attendance: 1,911; Referee: Elvis Osmanovic

December 20, 2025 16	Fort Lauderdale United FC	1–3	Spokane Zephyr FC	Fort Lauderdale, Florida
	Ansbrow (yellow card) 26'; Ademiluyi (yellow card) 36'; Van Treeck (yellow card) 45+3'; Rogers (yellow card) 55'; Locklear 74'	Report	Tucker 5'; Knox 44' (yellow card) 60'; Fontenot (yellow card) 63' (red card) 69'; Silano 67'	Stadium: Beyond Bancard Field; Attendance: 1,236; Referee: Danielle Chesky

February 1, 2026 17	Tampa Bay Sun FC	2–2	Spokane Zephyr FC	Suncoast Credit Union Field
	Nasello 27'; Parsons 71'; Chism (yellow card) 76'	Report	Silano 15'; Knox 53'	Attendance: 1,631; Referee: Richonne Clark

February 11, 2026 18	Sporting JAX	3–0	Spokane Zephyr FC	Jacksonville, Florida
7:00 PM ET	DeSmit 9'; Kenton 31'; Brown 39'	Report	Oyler (yellow card) 24'; Tappan (yellow card) 29'; Tucker (yellow card) 56'	Stadium: Hodges Stadium; Attendance: 8,377; Referee: Muhammad Hassan

February 14, 2026 19	Carolina Ascent FC	0–2	Spokane Zephyr FC	American Legion Memorial Stadium
	Porter (yellow card) 83'	Report	Jaskaniec (yellow card) 20'; Fontenot 26'; Silano 33'; Tucker (yellow card) 86'	Attendance: 2,064; Referee: Jaclyn Metz

March 14, 2026 20	Spokane Zephyr FC	3–0	Brooklyn FC	One Spokane Stadium
	Tappan 36'; Waldeck 41'; Ginger Fontenot 61'	Report		Attendance: 825; Referee: Laura Rodriguez

March 22, 2026 21	Spokane Zephyr FC	0–2	DC Power FC	One Spokane Stadium
		Report	Walker 46'; Torbert 55'	Attendance: 1,332; Referee: Kaitlyn Trowbridge

March 28, 2026 22	Sporting JAX	1–1	Spokane Zephyr FC	Jacksonville, Florida
7:30 PM ET	Boman 22'	Report	Knox 18'; Jaskaniec (yellow card) 64'; Thomas (yellow card) 72'	Stadium: Hodges Stadium; Attendance: 1,120; Referee: Jamie Padilla

April 4, 2026 23	Dallas Trinity FC	3–1	Spokane Zephyr FC	Cotton Bowl
	Oyler 15' (o.g.); Wisner 48' (pen.); Danielsson 90+1'	Report	Rapp 88'	Attendance: 2,979; Referee: Drew Klemp

April 20, 2026 24	Spokane Zephyr FC	2–1	Sporting JAX	One Spokane Stadium
	Waldeck 12'; Jaskaniec 69'	Report	Boman 36'	Attendance: 1,916; Referee: Kelsey Harms

April 27, 2026 25	Spokane Zephyr FC	3–1	Fort Lauderdale United FC	One Spokane Stadium
	Rapp 26'; Hansen 60' (pen.); Cook 89'	Report	Locklear 64'	Attendance: 1,594; Referee: Patricia McCracken

May 3, 2026 26	Spokane Zephyr FC	0–0	Lexington SC	One Spokane Stadium
		Report		Attendance: 1,742; Referee: Justin St.Pierre

May 10, 2026 28	Spokane Zephyr FC	1–0	DC Power FC	One Spokane Stadium
	Jaskaniec 69'	Report		Attendance: 1,436; Referee: Elton García

May 17, 2026 28	Spokane Zephyr FC	4–0	Brooklyn FC	One Spokane Stadium
	Marković 2' (o.g.); Knox 36'; Reiss 82'; Silano 88'	Report		Attendance: 2,017; Referee: Dion Coxe-Trieger

== Statistics ==
As of May 18, 2026

=== Appearances and goals ===
Starting appearances are listed first, followed by substitute appearances after the + symbol where applicable.

No.	Pos	Nat	Player	Total		USL	
No.	Pos	Nat	Player	Apps	Goals	Apps	Goals
Goalkeepers
0	GK	(United States) USA	Hope Hisey	28	0	28	0
1	GK	(United States) USA	Izzy Nino	0	0	0	0
27	GK	(Fiji) FIJ	Aliana Vakaloloma	0	0	0	0
31	GK	(United States) USA	Hailey Coll	0	0	0	0
Defenders
2	DF	(United States) USA	Reese Tappan	28	1	28	1
5	DF	(United States) USA	Sarah McCoy	24	0	22+2	0
7	DF	(United States) USA	Kelsey Oyler	27	0	22+5	0
11	DF	(United States) USA	Shea Collins	11	0	0+11	0
15	DF	(United States) USA	Natalie Viggiano	0	0	0	0
17	DF	(United States) USA	Madelyn Desiano	11	0	0+11	0
18	DF	(United States) USA	Haley Thomas	24	0	22+2	0
22	DF	(United States) USA	Charley Boone	20	0	10+10	0
23	DF	(United States) USA	Ginger Fontenot	24	2	19+5	2
Midfielders
3	MF	(United States) USA	Emma Jaskaniec	28	4	26+2	4
9	MF	(United States) USA	Cameron Tucker	19	1	16+3	1
13	MF	(Argentina) ARG	Sophia Braun	24	0	19+5	0
16	MF	(United States) USA	Felicia Knox	24	4	18+6	4
25	MF	(United States) USA	Catherine Rapp	9	2	6+3	2
26	MF	(United States) USA	Katie Murray	8	0	5+3	0
32	MF	(United States) USA	Maggie Johnston	12	0	3+9	0
Forwards
6	FW	(Ecuador) ECU	Kaira Houser	3	0	0+3	0
8	FW	(United States) USA	Lena Silano	28	7	21+7	7
14	FW	(United States) USA	Maya Hansen	10	1	5+5	1
19	FW	(United States) USA	Tori Waldeck Zierenberg	20	4	15+5	4
30	FW	(Brazil) BRA	Thais Reiss	5	1	0+5	1
33	FW	(United States) USA	Ally Cook	19	5	11+8	5
Players who left the club during the season:
4	MF	(England) ENG	Mollie Rouse	2	0	1+1	0
12	MF	(United States) USA	Aryssa Mahrt	15	0	9+6	0
21	MF	(United States) USA	Olivia van der Jagt	4	0	2+2	0
Own goals for:
—	—		Maya McCutcheon (10/12 v. DAL)	0	1	0	1

== Transactions ==
=== Loans in ===
Date	Player	Pos.	Loaned from	Fee/notes	Ref.
July 16, 2025	(United States) Olivia Van der Jagt	MF	(United States) Seattle Reign FC	Loaned through January 2026.	
July 16, 2025	(United States) Aryssa Mahrt	MF	(United States) Orlando Pride	Loaned through January 2026.	

=== Transfers in ===
Date	Player	Pos.	Previous club	Fee/notes	Ref.
July 1, 2025	(United States) Cameron Tucker	FW	(Spain) Levante UD	Free agent	
July 9, 2025	(United States) Kelsey Oyler	DF	(United States) Arkansas Razorbacks	Rookie	
July 10, 2025	(United States) Maggie Johnston	MF	(United States) Iowa Hawkeyes	Rookie	
July 10, 2025	(United States) Shea Collins	DF	(United States) James Madison Dukes	Rookie	
July 15, 2025	(United States) Tori Waldeck Zierenberg	FW	(United States) Pepperdine Waves	Rookie	
July 21, 2025	(United States) Madelyn Desiano	DF	(Denmark) Odense Boldklub Q	Free agent	
July 22, 2025	(United States) Lena Silano	FW	(Spain) UD Tenerife	Free agent	
July 23, 2025	(United States) Ginger Fontenot	DF	(United States) Brooklyn FC	Free agent	
August 14, 2025	(United States) Charley Boone	DF	(United States) Minnesota Aurora FC	Free agent	
August 21, 2025	(Ecuador) Kaira Houser	FW	(United States) KC Courage	Free agent	
September 5, 2025	(United States) Felicia Knox	MF	(United States) Fort Lauderdale United FC	Free agent	
December 19, 2025	(Fiji) Aliana Vakaloloma	GK	(United States) Spokane Shadow Academy	Academy signing	
December 22, 2025	(United States) Maya Hansen	FW	(Iceland) FH	Free agent	
January 6, 2026	(United States) Catherine Rapp	MF	(United States) Kentucky Wildcats	Rookie	
February 18, 2026	(United States) Cece Villa	GK	(United States) Nebraska Cornhuskers	Rookie	

=== Transfers out ===
Date	Player	Pos.	Destination club	Fee/notes	Ref.
June 27, 2025	(Guyana) Sydney Cummings	DF	(United States) DC Power FC	Out of contract	
June 30, 2025	(United States) Alyssa Bourgeois	DF	(United States) Lexington SC	Out of contract	
June 30, 2025	(United States) Marley Canales	MF		Out of contract	
June 30, 2025	(United States) Taryn Ries	FW		Out of contract	
June 30, 2025	(United States) Jenny Vetter	FW	(Finland) Åland United	Out of contract	
June 30, 2025	(United States) McKenzie Weinert	FW	(United States) Lexington SC	Out of contract	
July 2, 2025	(United States) Taylor Aylmer	MF	(United States) Lexington SC	Out of contract	
July 7, 2025	(United States) Alyssa Walker	FW	(United States) Carolina Ascent FC	Out of contract	
July 13, 2025	(Canada) Wayny Balata	MF	(United States) Dallas Trinity FC	Out of contract	
July 18, 2025	(Bosnia and Herzegovina) Emina Ekić	MF	(United States) Lexington SC	Transfer	
July 30, 2025	(Canada) Julianne Vallerand	DF	(Canada) Halifax Tides FC	Out of contract	
August 15, 2025	(United States) Jodi Ülkekul	FW	(Australia) Sydney FC	Out of contract	
September 5, 2025	(England) Mollie Rouse	MF	(England) Sheffield United	Transfer	
