= 2023 USL W League season =

USL W League
- Season: 2023
- Dates: May 6 - July 2 (regular season); July 6 - July 22 (playoffs)
- Champions: Indy Eleven (1st Title)
- Regular Season Champions: Minnesota Aurora FC (2nd Title)
- Matches: 375
- Goals: 1,464 (3.9 per match)
- Best player: (Portugal) Nádia Gomes (San Francisco Glens SC)
- Top goalscorer: (United States) Baylee DeSmit (Christos FC) (21 goals)
- Best goalkeeper: (United States) Bailey Herfurth (Tampa Bay United)
- Biggest home win: IND 16, STC 0 (June 30)
- Biggest away win: PFA 0, CHR 9 (May 21)
- Highest scoring: IND 16, STC 0 (June 30)
- Longest winning run: 12 games Minnesota Aurora FC; Tampa Bay United
- Longest unbeaten run: 12 games Minnesota Aurora FC; North Carolina Courage U23; Flint City AFC; Tampa Bay United
- Longest winless run: 11 games Patuxent Football Athletics
- Longest losing run: 11 games Patuxent Football Athletics
- All statistics correct as of July 2, 2023.

The 2023 USL W League season is the 2nd season for the league. The regular season began on May 6 and ended on July 2. 16 teams qualified for the league playoffs, which began on July 6.

== Team changes ==
=== New teams ===
- Academica SC (Turlock, CA)
- Bavarian United SC (Milwaukee, WI)
- Birmingham Legion WFC
- California Storm (Sacramento, CA)
- Capital FC Atletica (Salem, OR)
- Cleveland Force SC
- FC Carolinas (Waxhaws, NC)
- Lane United FC (Eugene, OR)
- Lexington SC
- Marin FC Siren (Greenbrae, CA)
- North Alabama SC (Huntsville, AL)
- Oakland Soul SC
- Olympic Club SC (San Francisco, CA)
- Oly Town FC (Olympia, WA)
- Paisley Athletic FC (Kearny, NJ)
- Palm City Americanas (Palm City, FL)
- PDX FC (Portland, OR)
- Pleasanton RAGE (Pleasanton, CA)
- RKC Third Coast (Racine & Kenosha, WI)
- Rochester FC (Rochester, MN)
- St. Charles FC (St. Charles, MO)
- San Francisco Glens
- Stockton Cargo SC (Stockton, CA)
- Swan City SC (Lakeland, FL)
- United PDX (Portland, OR)
- Virginia Marauders FC (Winchester, VA)

=== Departing teams ===
- Caledonia SC
- Kaw Valley FC
- Peachtree City MOBA
- Queensboro FC
- St. Louis Lions

== Standings ==
=== Eastern Conference ===
==== Metropolitan Division ====
Pos	Team	Pld	W	D	L	GF	GA	GD	Pts	PPG	Qualification
1	Morris Elite SC	12	10	1	1	54	5	+49	31 (Note: Morris Elite SC wins the tiebreaker over Long Island Rough Riders on goal differential.)	2.58	Advance to USL W League Playoffs
2	Long Island Rough Riders	12	10	1	1	43	13	+30	31	2.58	Advance to USL W League Playoffs
3	Cedar Stars	12	8	2	2	29	17	+12	26	2.17	
4	F.A. Euro	11	5	2	4	24	19	+5	17	1.55	
5	Manhattan SC	11	3	2	6	13	25	−12	11	1.00	
6	Paisley Athletic FC	12	1	5	6	11	28	−17	8	0.67	
7	Westchester Flames	12	2	0	10	7	45	−38	6	0.50	
8	AC Connecticut	12	1	1	10	9	38	−29	4	0.33	

Source: USL

==== Mid Atlantic Division ====
Pos	Team	Pld	W	D	L	GF	GA	GD	Pts	PPG	Qualification
1	Eagle FC	12	11	0	1	40	10	+30	33	2.75	Advance to USL W League Playoffs
2	Christos FC	12	9	0	3	42	17	+25	27	2.25	Advance to USL W League Playoffs
3	Northern Virginia FC	11	6	0	5	21	24	−3	18	1.64	
4	McLean Soccer	11	5	0	6	42	16	+26	15	1.36	
5	Virginia Marauders FC	11	3	0	8	11	31	−20	9	0.82	
6	Patuxent Football Athletics	11	0	0	11	7	65	−58	0	0.00	

Source: USL

=== Central Conference ===
==== Great Lakes Division ====
Pos	Team	Pld	W	D	L	GF	GA	GD	Pts	PPG	Qualification
1	Flint City AFC	12	9	3	0	38	14	+24	30	2.50	Advance to USL W League Playoffs
2	Kalamazoo FC	12	5	4	3	23	19	+4	19	1.58	
3	Detroit City FC	12	5	3	4	19	17	+2	18	1.50	
4	Midwest United FC	12	5	2	5	15	16	−1	17	1.42	
5	AFC Ann Arbor	12	4	2	6	14	31	−17	14	1.17	
6	Cleveland Force SC	12	1	0	11	7	19	−12	3	0.25	

Source: USL

==== Heartland Division ====
Pos	Team	Pld	W	D	L	GF	GA	GD	Pts	PPG	Qualification
1	Minnesota Aurora FC	12	12	0	0	60	4	+56	36	3.00	Advance to USL W League Playoffs
2	Chicago City SC	12	8	1	3	26	16	+10	25	2.08	Advance to USL W League Playoffs
3	Chicago Dutch Lions	11	7	0	4	24	19	+5	21	1.91	
4	Bavarian United SC	11	5	1	5	20	18	+2	16	1.45	
5	RKC Third Coast	11	3	0	8	10	43	−33	9 (Note: RKC Third Coast wins the tiebreaker over Green Bay Glory on head-to-head record.)	0.82	
6	Green Bay Glory	11	3	0	8	12	27	−15	9	0.82	
7	Rochester FC	12	1	0	11	6	31	−25	3	0.25	

Source: USL

==== Valley Division ====
Pos	Team	Pld	W	D	L	GF	GA	GD	Pts	PPG	Qualification
1	Indy Eleven	10	8	1	1	40	3	+37	25 (Note: Indy Eleven wins the tiebreaker over Racing Louisville FC on head-to-head record.)	2.50	Advance to USL W League Playoffs
2	Racing Louisville FC	10	8	1	1	42	4	+38	25	2.50	
3	Lexington SC	10	3	1	6	10	17	−7	10	1.00	
4	Kings Hammer FC	10	2	1	7	5	25	−20	7	0.70	
5	St. Charles FC	10	1	2	7	5	53	−48	5	0.50	

Source: USL

=== Southern Conference ===
==== South Atlantic Division ====
Pos	Team	Pld	W	D	L	GF	GA	GD	Pts	PPG	Qualification
1	North Carolina Courage U23	12	11	1	0	46	7	+39	34	2.83	Advance to USL W League Playoffs
2	Asheville City SC	12	7	1	4	21	16	+5	22	1.83	
3	Wake FC	12	6	2	4	21	17	+4	20	1.67	
4	North Carolina Fusion	12	5	1	6	18	31	−13	16	1.33	
5	Charlotte Independence	12	4	1	7	12	17	−5	13	1.08	
6	Greenville Liberty SC	12	3	0	9	16	27	−11	9	0.75	
7	FC Carolinas	12	3	0	9	5	24	−19	9	0.75	

Source: USL

==== South Central Division ====
Pos	Team	Pld	W	D	L	GF	GA	GD	Pts	PPG	Qualification
1	Tennessee SC	12	8	2	2	30	8	+22	26	2.17	Advance to USL W League Playoffs
2	Chattanooga Red Wolves SC	12	8	1	3	26	8	+18	25	2.08	
3	Tormenta FC	12	6	3	3	20	9	+11	21	1.75	
4	Birmingham Legion WFC	12	5	3	4	23	20	+3	18	1.50	
5	Southern Soccer Academy	12	4	2	6	20	18	+2	14	1.17	
6	South Carolina United FC	12	3	2	7	15	19	−4	11	0.92	
7	North Alabama SC	12	1	1	10	5	57	−52	4	0.33	

Source: USL

==== Southeast Division ====
Pos	Team	Pld	W	D	L	GF	GA	GD	Pts	PPG	Qualification
1	Tampa Bay United	12	12	0	0	43	1	+42	36	3.00	Advance to USL W League Playoffs
2	FC Miami City	12	9	1	2	28	10	+18	28	2.33	Advance to USL W League Playoffs
3	Florida Elite SA	12	6	1	5	23	16	+7	19	1.58	
4	Palm City Americanas	12	3	2	7	22	21	+1	11	0.92	
5	Swan City SC	12	1	2	9	24	44	−20	5 (Note: Swan City SC wins the tiebreaker over Miami AC on goal differential.)	0.42	
6	Miami AC	12	1	2	9	8	56	−48	5 (Note: Florida Elite match was forfeited 3–0 in favor of Florida Elite)	0.42	

Source: USL

=== Western Conference ===
==== Northwest Division ====
Pos	Team	Pld	W	D	L	GF	GA	GD	Pts	PPG	Qualification
1	Oly Town FC	10	8	2	0	34	6	+28	26	2.60	Advance to USL W League Playoffs
2	United PDX	10	7	2	1	36	9	+27	23	2.30	
3	Lane United FC	10	2	2	6	11	23	−12	8 (Note: Lane United FC wins the tiebreaker over PDX FC on goal differential.)	0.80	
4	PDX FC	10	2	2	6	14	39	−25	8	0.80	
5	Capital FC Atletica	10	1	2	7	9	27	−18	5	0.50	

Source: USL

==== Nor Cal Division ====
Pos	Team	Pld	W	D	L	GF	GA	GD	Pts	PPG	Qualification
1	San Francisco Glens	12	10	1	1	44	12	+32	31	2.58	Advance to USL W League Playoffs
2	Oakland Soul SC	12	10	0	2	37	13	+24	30	2.50	Advance to USL W League Playoffs
3	California Storm	12	9	1	2	46	12	+34	28	2.33	Advance to USL W League Playoffs
4	Stockton Cargo SC	12	7	0	5	29	23	+6	21	1.75	
5	Olympic Club SC	12	3	1	8	9	38	−29	10	0.83	
6	Pleasanton RAGE	12	2	2	8	9	32	−23	8	0.67	
7	Academica SC	12	2	1	9	15	47	−32	7	0.58	
8	Marin FC Sirens	12	1	2	9	16	28	−12	5	0.42	

Source: USL

== Playoffs ==
=== Bracket ===
Conference semifinals
Long Island Rough Riders	2
Morris Elite SC	3
Eastern Conference
Eagle FC	2
Christos FC	1
Tampa Bay United	3
Tennessee SC	2
Southern Conference
North Carolina Courage U23	3
FC Miami City	0
Minnesota Aurora FC	1
Chicago City SC	0
Central Conference
Flint City AFC	0
Indy Eleven	3
San Francisco Glens SC	5
Oakland Soul SC	1
Western Conference
California Storm	1
Oly Town FC	0

Conference finals
Morris Elite SC	0
Eagle FC	6
Tampa Bay United	0
North Carolina Courage U23	3
Minnesota Aurora FC	0
Indy Eleven	1
San Francisco Glens SC	2
California Storm	1

Semifinals
Eagle FC	1
North Carolina Courage U23	4
Indy Eleven	3
San Francisco Glens SC	2

Final
North Carolina Courage U23	1
Indy Eleven (a.e.t.)	2

=== Conference semifinals ===
July 6	Minnesota Aurora FC	1–0	Chicago City SC	Atwood Stadium; Flint, Michigan
3:00 PM EDT	Del Moral 23' (pen.); Ostrem (yellow card) 67'; Rapp (yellow card) 90'	Report	Jamie (yellow card) 76' (yellow-red card) 78'	Referee: Taylor Heemstra

July 6	Tampa Bay United	3–2	Tennessee SC	WakeMed Soccer Park Field 2 Cary, North Carolina
5:00 PM EDT	Nicholson 20'; Boeckmann 51'; Shackelford 79'	Report	Molenaar 32', 65'	Referee: Nicholas Strednak

July 6	Flint City AFC	0–3	Indy Eleven	Atwood Stadium; Flint, Michigan
7:00 PM EDT		Report	Bahr 14' (pen.); Dewey 42'; Schmidt (yellow card) 45'; Soderstrom 48'; Kugler (yellow card) 79'	Referee: Taylor Heemstra

July 6	North Carolina Courage U23	3–0	FC Miami City	WakeMed Soccer Park Field 2 Cary, North Carolina
7:00 PM EDT	Ansbrow (yellow card) 27'; Brown 40'; Geigle 67'; Oliaro (yellow card) 68'; Francher 83'	Report	Murillo (yellow card) 88'; Oppelland (yellow card) 90'	Referee: Achal Awasthi

July 7	San Francisco Glens SC	5–1	Oakland Soul SC	Skyline College; San Bruno, California
12:30 PM PDT	Gomes 4', 45+1', 80'; Lageyre 9'; Piper 47'	Report	Geis 87'	Referee: Devlin Creighton

July 7	Morris Elite SC	3–2	Long Island Rough Riders	Mountain View Middle School; Mechanicsburg, Pennsylvania
3:00 PM EDT	Manning 10', 75'; Denbleyker (yellow card) 15'; Cross 90'	Report	Gordon 13' (yellow card) 80'; Garziano 35'; Moore (yellow card) 84'

July 7	Eagle FC	2–1	Christos FC	Mountain View Middle School; Mechanicsburg, Pennsylvania
7:00 PM EDT	Christopher 24'; Tate 45+1'	Report	Desmit 39' (yellow card) 56'

July 7	California Storm	1–0	Oly Town FC	Davis Legacy Field; Davis, California
7:00 PM PDT	Tillett (yellow card) 30'; Smith 63'; Villa (yellow card) 78'	Report	Bunnell (yellow card) 90'

=== Conference finals ===
July 8	Indy Eleven	1–0	Minnesota Aurora FC	Atwood Stadium; Flint, Michigan
3:00 PM EDT	Chatterton (yellow card) 48'; Dewey 57'	Report

July 8	North Carolina Courage U23	3–0	Tampa Bay United	WakeMed Soccer Park Field 2 Cary, North Carolina
6:45 PM EDT	Moxely 30'; Alvarez 36'; Francher 49'	Report

July 9	San Francisco Glens SC	2–1	California Storm	Skyline College; San Bruno, California
12:30 PM PDT	Marcisz 45+1'; Bhuta (yellow card) 74'; Lageyre 87'	Report	Lancaster 2'; Hardeman (yellow card) 42'

July 9	Eagle FC	6–0	Morris Elite SC	Mountain View Middle School; Mechanicsburg, Pennsylvania
5:30 PM EDT	Butlion 45+3'; Descary 48'; Tate 54'; Christopher 64', 75'; Hollenbach 87'	Report

=== Semifinals ===
July 14	North Carolina Courage U23	4–1	Eagle FC	WakeMed Soccer Park Field 2 Cary, North Carolina
7:00 PM EDT	Oliaro 22'; Bader 26'; Geigle 45+2'; Ayscue (yellow card) 76'; Moxely 81' (pen.); Smith (yellow card) 90+4'	Report	Christopher 64'; Davis (yellow card) 80'

July 14	Indy Eleven	3–2	San Francisco Glens SC	Grand Park Soccer Complex; Westfield, Indiana
7:00 PM EDT	Chester 14' (yellow card) 87'; Williams 50'; Martin 90+1'	Report	Gomes 40'; Immethun (yellow card) 60'; Penn 64'

=== Final ===
July 22
2:00 EDT

Indy Eleven	2–1 (a.e.t.)	North Carolina Courage U23
Williams 64'; Martin 99'	Report	Martinho 75'

IU Michael A. Carroll Track & Soccer Stadium
Indianapolis, Indiana
Attendance: 5,419
Referee: Itzel Ochoa

Indy Eleven	NC Courage U23

GK	1	(United States) Nona Reason
LB	13	(United States) Jenna Chatterton	(substituted off) 81'
CB	5	(United States) Grace Bahr	(substituted off) 116'
CB	20	(United States) Annika Schmidt
RB	22	(Australia) Greta Kraszula	(substituted off) 67'
LM	21	(United States) Samantha Dewey	(substituted off) 67'
CM	15	(United States) Alia Martin
RM	16	(United States) Ella Rogers
LW	10	(United States) Addie Chester	(substituted off) 77'
FW	12	(United States) Madison Williams	(substituted off) 67'
RW	9	(United States) Katherine Soderstrom
Substitutes:
GK	0	(United States) Emily Edwards
MF	2	(United States) Emma Johnson	(substituted on) 67'
DF	14	(United States) Lizzie Sexton	(substituted on) 77'
DF	17	(United States) Rafferty Kugler	(substituted on) 67'
MF	18	(United States) Rhonda Ojongmboh	(substituted on) 116'
FW	19	(United States) Maisie Whitsett	(substituted on) 67'
MF	24	(United States) Susie Soderstrom	(substituted on) 81'
Manager:
(United States) Sebastian Giraldo			(yellow card) 90'

GK	1	(United States) Emmie Allen
LB	23	(United States) Brooklyn Holt		(substituted off) 105'
CB	16	(United States) Taylor Chism		(substituted off) 78'
CB	22	(United States) Bella Ayscue
RB	4	(United States) Aven Alvarez		(substituted off) 78'
LM	9	(United States) Lauren Martinho		(substituted off) 105'
CM	26	(United States) Katie Groff
RM	29	(United States) Maggie Graham		(substituted off) 60'
LW	20	(United States) Mia Oliaro
FW	5	(United States) Mackenzie Geigle	(yellow card) 47'	(substituted off) 60'
RW	15	(United States) Emily Moxley
Substitutes:
GK	13	(United States) MK Daly
MF	8	(United States) Phoebe Goldthwaite		(substituted on) 78'
DF	17	(United States) Hannah Jibril		(substituted on) 105'
MF	19	(United States) Gabrielle Ciocca		(substituted on) 105'
MF	21	(United States) Amelia Brown		(substituted on) 60'
FW	27	(United States) Isabella Brown		(substituted on) 60'
MF	28	(United States) Braelynn Francher		(substituted on) 78'
Manager:
(United States) Willie Davis Jr.

Championship MVP:
(United States) Alia Martin

Match rules

- 90 minutes.
- 30 minutes of extra time if necessary.
- Penalty shootout if scores still level.
- Maximum of seven substitutions.

Championship MVP: (United States) Alia Martin (IND)

== Awards ==
=== Individual awards ===
Award	Winner	Team	Reason	Ref.
Golden Boot	(United States) Baylee DeSmit	Christos FC	21 goals in 11 games	
Golden Glove	(United States) Bailey Herfurth	Tampa Bay United	.096 Goals Against Average; 11 Shutouts	
Defender of the Year	(Canada) Tianna Harris	Minnesota Aurora FC	4 goals; 2 assists	
Assists Champion	(United States) Katie Shea Collins	Tennessee SC	7 assists	
Young (U20) Player of the Year	(United States) Mia Oliaro	North Carolina Courage U23	5 goals; 5 assists	
Coach of the Year	(United States) Michele Krzisnik	Flint City AFC	undefeated regular season	
Player of the Year	(Portugal) Nádia Gomes	San Francisco Glens SC	16 goals, 8 assists	

=== Monthly Awards ===
Team of the Month
Month	Goalkeeper	Defenders	Midfielders	Forwards	Ref.
May	(United States) Bailey Herfurth (TBU)	(United States) Grace Pettet (RCL) (Canada) Tianna Harris (MNA) (United States) Elle Piper (SFG)	(United States) Meg Tate (EFC) (United States) Mackenzie Smith (CRW) (United States) Mia Oliaro (NCC) (United States) Isabella Gaetino (FCA)	(United States) Alexis Brewah (STC) (United States) Lia Howard (LIR) (United States) Baylee DeSmit (CHR)	
June	(United States) Taiana Tolleson (TEN)	(United States) Laurel Ansbrow (NCC) (Puerto Rico) Madison Cox (TBU) (United States) Juliana Ryan (MOR)	(Bermuda) Nia Christopher (EFC) (United States) Addie Chester (IND) (United States) Hannah Adler (MNA) (United States) Kennedy Berschel (CHI)	(United States) Baylee DeSmit (CHR) (Portugal) Nadia Gomes (SFG) (United States) Mariah Lee (OLY)	

=== All-League Teams ===
==== First Team ====
F: (United States) Samantha Dewey (IND), (United States) Baylee DeSmit (IND), (Portugal) Nádia Gomes (SFG)
M: (United States) Bella Gaetino (FCA), (United States) Mia Oliaro (NCC), (Bermuda) Nia Christopher (EFC), (United States) Katie Shea Collins (TEN)
D: (United States) Laurel Ansbrow (NCC), (Canada) Tianna Harris (MNA), (United States) Elle Piper (SFG)
G: (United States) Bailey Herfurth (TBU)

==== Second Team ====
F: (United States) Claire Manning (MOR), (United States) Mariah Lee (OLY), (United States) Giana Riley (CAL)
M: (United States) Hannah Adler (MNA), (United States) Kennedy Berschel (CHI), (United States) Alia Martin (IND), (United States) Lauren Martinho (NCC)
D: (Puerto Rico) Madison Cox (TBU), (United States) Carly Smith (EFC), (United States) Grace Bahr (IND)
G: (United States) Nona Reason (IND)

Divisional Players of the Year
Division	Player	Team
Great Lakes	(United States) Bailey Korhorn	Kalamazoo FC
Heartland	(United States) Maya Hansen	Minnesota Aurora FC
Metropolitan	(United States) Claire Manning	Morris Elite SC
Mid Atlantic	(United States) Baylee DeSmit	Christos FC
NorCal	(Portugal) Nádia Gomes	San Francisco Glens SC
Northwest	(United States) Mariah Lee	Oly Town FC
Southeast	(United States) Carissa Boeckmann	Tampa Bay United
South Atlantic	(United States) Mia Oliaro	North Carolina Courage U23
South Central	(United States) Katie Shea Collins	Tennessee SC
Valley	(United States) Samantha Dewey	Indy Eleven
