= North Carolina Courage U23 =

- Founded: January 27, 2022; 4 years ago
- Stadium: WakeMed Soccer Park; Cary, North Carolina, United States
- Head coach: Willie Davis
- League: USL W League
- 2024: 1st of 6 (South Atlantic div.); Champions (Southern Conf.); Finalists (National playoffs)
Home colors	Away colors

North Carolina Courage U23, also known as North Carolina Courage USL W, is an amateur women's soccer team that plays in the USL W League. It is affiliated and shares ownership with the professional team North Carolina Courage, which competes in the National Women's Soccer League (NWSL).

== History ==
In January 2022, NWSL club North Carolina Courage added an amateur team to compete in the newly formed W League, becoming the second NWSL club to do so after Racing Louisville FC earlier that month.

In the 2023 USL W League season, the Courage U23s went undefeated with an 11–0–1 record to win the South Atlantic division, then defeated FC Miami City and Tampa Bay United in consecutive 3–0 victories to win the Southern Conference championship and advance to the national championship semifinals. After defeating Eagle FC 4–1, the Courage U23s advanced to the national finals for the first time in club history, facing Indy Eleven, where they lost 2–1 in overtime. Former USWNT player Heather O'Reilly joined the team as a player and coach that season.

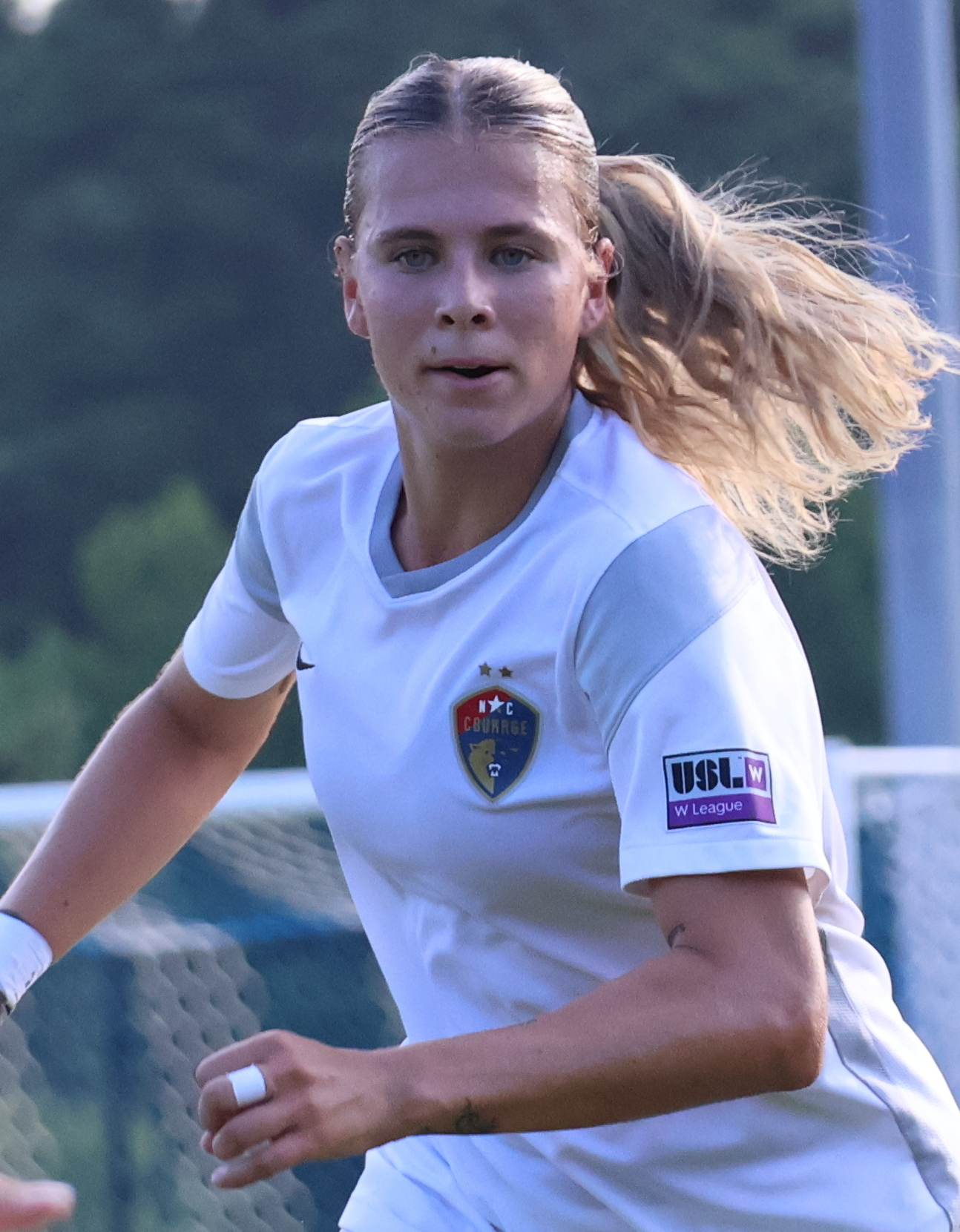
Macey Bader, the most valuable player of the 2024 USL W League final

The Courage U23s returned to the national final with a 14–0–1 in the 2024 season. They defeated the Colorado Storm in a 3–2 comeback victory at WRAL Soccer Park in Raleigh.

== Stadium ==
North Carolina Courage plays its W League matches at Field Two at WakeMed Soccer Park in Cary, North Carolina.

== Players ==
=== 2025 squad ===
As of May 18, 2025

Roster
Pos.	Name	College/club
DF	Aven Alvarez	North Carolina
MF	Julia Amireh	North Carolina Courage
MF	Aleigha Arndt	James Madison
FW	Macey Bader	Charlotte
MF	Anna Barber	Cincinnati
MF	Amelia Brown	Charlotte
MF	Amaris Bumba	North Carolina Courage
FW	Madison Casteen	North Carolina Courage
DF	Taylor Chism	Auburn
MF	Gabrielle Ciocca	Virginia Tech
DF	Carli Crews	Memphis
FW	Syrianna Davis	North Carolina Courage
GK	Franky Dunlap	North Carolina Courage
MF	Eva Forster	North Carolina Courage
FW	Ivy Garner	Liberty
FW	Mackenzie Geigle	Louisville
DF	Lindsey Hailey	North Carolina Courage
DF	Kayleigh Herr	Penn State
MF/FW	Lia Howard	Illinois
MF	Grace Ivey	Texas A&M
DF	Ella Kate Mueller	North Carolina Courage
GK	Mary Katherine Daly	Dartmouth
MF	Rylee Keeley	Pittsburgh
MF	Riley Kennedy	North Carolina Courage
FW	Leah Kuklick	North Carolina Courage
MF	Sarah Martinez	North Carolina Courage
MF	Peyton May	North Carolina Courage
FW	Mia Minestrella	Duke
MF	Lauren Montgomery	Ole Miss
DF	Brennan Moore	North Carolina Courage
MF	Maliyah Morrison	Ohio State
MF	Mana Nakata	NC State
MF	Cazzi Norgren	Missouri State
DF	Cali O'Neill	North Carolina Courage
MF	Gesare Omwenga	North Carolina Courage
GK	Olivia Pratapas	NC State
MF	Katie Richter	North Carolina Courage
FW	Julia Saunicheva	Duke
MF	Evelyn Shores	North Carolina

=== Notable former players ===
- Emmie Allen (2022–2023)
- Hannah Bebar (2024)
- Emerson Elgin (2024)
- Leah Freeman (2023)
- Maggie Graham (2022–2023)
- Emily Moxley (2022–2023)
- Mia Oliaro (2022–2024)
- Éabha O'Mahony (2022)
- Heather O'Reilly (2024)
- Lucy Roberts (2023)
- Bella Sember (2024)
- Olivia Thomas (2024)

== Staff ==
=== Coaching history ===
- 2022–: (United States) Willie Davis

== Year-by-year ==
As of July 7, 2026

Season	League	Division	Regular season									Playoffs	Top goalscorer	Ref.
Season	League	Division	P	W	D	L	GF	GA	GD	Pts.	Pos.	Playoffs	Top goalscorer	Ref.
2022	USL W	South Atlantic	12	6	2	4	24	14	+10	22	2nd	Did not qualify	Emily Sapienza (5)	
2023	USL W	South Atlantic	12	11	1	0	46	7	+39	34	1st	Finals	Izzy Brown (8)	
2024	USL W	South Atlantic	12	11	1	0	56	6	+50	34	1st	Champions	Mackenzie Geigle, Macey Bader (8)	
2025	USL W	South Atlantic	12	10	2	0	31	9	+22	32	1st	Finals	Grace Ivey, Ivy Garner, Mia Minastrella (5)	
2026	USL W	South Atlantic	10	9	0	1	33	8	+25	27	2nd	Did not qualify	Katie Richter (7)	

== See also ==
- North Carolina FC
- North Carolina Courage
- North Carolina FC U23
- North Carolina FC Youth
