= Cat Rapp =

American soccer player (born 2004)

Catherine Rapp
Personal information
- Full name: Catherine Rapp
- Date of birth: May 2, 2004 (age 22)
- Height: 5 ft 6 in (1.68 m)
- Position: Midfielder

Team information
- Current team: Sporting JAX
- Number: 15

College career
Years	Team	Apps	(Gls)
2022–2024	FIU Panthers	44	(8)
2025	Kentucky Wildcats	21	(7)

Senior career*
Years	Team	Apps	(Gls)
2022–2025	Minnesota Aurora	47	(24)
2026	Spokane Zephyr	9	(2)
2026–	Sporting JAX	3	(0)
- * Club domestic league appearances and goals as of 07:58, October 16, 2026 (UTC)

Catherine Rapp (born May 2, 2004) is an American professional soccer player who plays as a midfielder for USL Super League club Sporting JAX. She played college soccer for the FIU Panthers and the Kentucky Wildcats before starting her professional career with the Spokane Zephyr.

== Early life ==
Rapp started playing soccer at an early age in Arkansas before her family moved to Evergreen, Colorado when Rapp was a child. She went on to play for Evergreen High School alongside her two sisters, helping the team make it two regional championships. Rapp earned individual recognition as a two-time Jefferson County Athlete of the Year and a one-time conference MVP.

== College career ==
=== FIU Panthers ===
On August 18, 2022, Rapp made her collegiate debut for the FIU Panthers. Exactly one week later, she scored her first two college goals, helping FIU beat Stetson, 3–1. She went on to post 14 appearances in each of her first two collegiate seasons, including in a freshman campaign in which she was third on FIU in minutes played.

As a junior, Rapp started all 20 of the Panthers' games, recording six full 90-minute performances, and scored 4 goals. She was named to the All-CUSA second team after helping FIU reach a regular season conference championship. In the semifinals of the CUSA tournament, she scored the game-winning goal over Middle Tennessee to lift FIU to its first-ever CUSA championship game, which the Panthers would go on to win. The following match, Rapp played all 90 minutes in FIU's NCAA tournament first-round defeat to Auburn.

=== Kentucky Wildcats ===
Ahead of the 2025 season, Rapp transferred to the University of Kentucky. She posted career-high figures in her sole season with the Wildcats, registering 21 appearances, 7 goals (tied for first on the team), and 6 assists. Four of her goal contributions came in a single match, with Rapp scoring twice and assisting twice in a victory over Purdue Fort Wayne in August 2025. Rapp also scored on November 2, 2025, in a victory over Florida that helped Kentucky reach the second round of the SEC tournament (where they were then defeated by Georgia). In the Wildcats' NCAA tournament opener against Louisville, Rapp played a season-high 110 minutes as Kentucky lost the game on penalties.

== Club career ==
=== Minnesota Aurora ===
During the offseasons leading up to each of her four years of college, Rapp played for pre-professional team Minnesota Aurora FC in the USL W League. She spent her first stint with the Aurora right after graduating from high school, in the inaugural USL W League season. Playing alongside each of her two sisters, she was mostly a substitute throughout 2022 as the Aurora recorded an undefeated season. In the league championship match, however, Rapp played the entirety of the extra time defeat to Tormenta FC that finally snapped the Aurora's unbeaten streak.

After completing her first year at FIU, Rapp returned to Minnesota and helped the Aurora finish another regular season undefeated. Serving as dual attacking midfielders with Hannah Adler, Rapp thrived in counter-attacking situations and ended up tallying 9 goals and 6 assists across 13 games. Rapp would return to the Aurora again in both 2024 and 2025. At the end of her fourth season with the team, she set the Aurora team record for career goals, with 24.

=== Spokane Zephyr ===
On January 6, 2026, USL Super League club Spokane Zephyr FC announced that they had signed Rapp to her first professional contract ahead of the spring portion of the 2025–26 season. The move reunited Rapp with former Minnesota Aurora head coach Nicole Lukic, who had been hired in the same role for Spokane three months earlier. Rapp made her professional debut on February 11, 2026, starting and playing 65 minutes in a 3–0 loss to Sporting JAX. On April 4, she scored her first professional goal, finishing a cross from Madelyn Desiano in a defeat to the Dallas Trinity. The club folded after the season in May 2026.

=== Sporting JAX ===
In August 2026, two weeks into the 2026 USL Super League season, Rapp signed for Sporting Club Jacksonville. She made her club debut on August 29 against Dallas Trinity FC, entering the game in the 75th minute and assisting Sophia Boman's goal five minutes later.

== Personal life ==
Rapp is the middle triplet of three triplet sisters. Her youngest sister, Rami, played collegiately for the Oklahoma Sooners and the Coastal Carolina Chanticleers. Her older sister, Elizabeth, also played for Oklahoma before spending one season at FIU alongside Catherine; Elizabeth currently plays for the Portland Pilots. All three sisters played alongside one another in high school and for the Minnesota Aurora.

== Career statistics ==
=== Club ===
As of match played October 16, 2026

Club	Season	League			Cup		Playoffs		Total	
Club	Season	Division	Apps	Goals	Apps	Goals	Apps	Goals	Apps	Goals
Spokane Zephyr FC	2025–26	USL Super League	9	2	—		—		9	2
Sporting JAX	2026	USL Super League	3	0	—		—		3	0
Career total			12	2	—		—		12	2

== Honors and awards ==
FIU Panthers

- Conference USA: 2024
- Conference USA women's soccer tournament: 2024

Individual

- Second-team All-CUSA: 2024
