= Carissa Boeckmann =

American soccer player (born 2003)

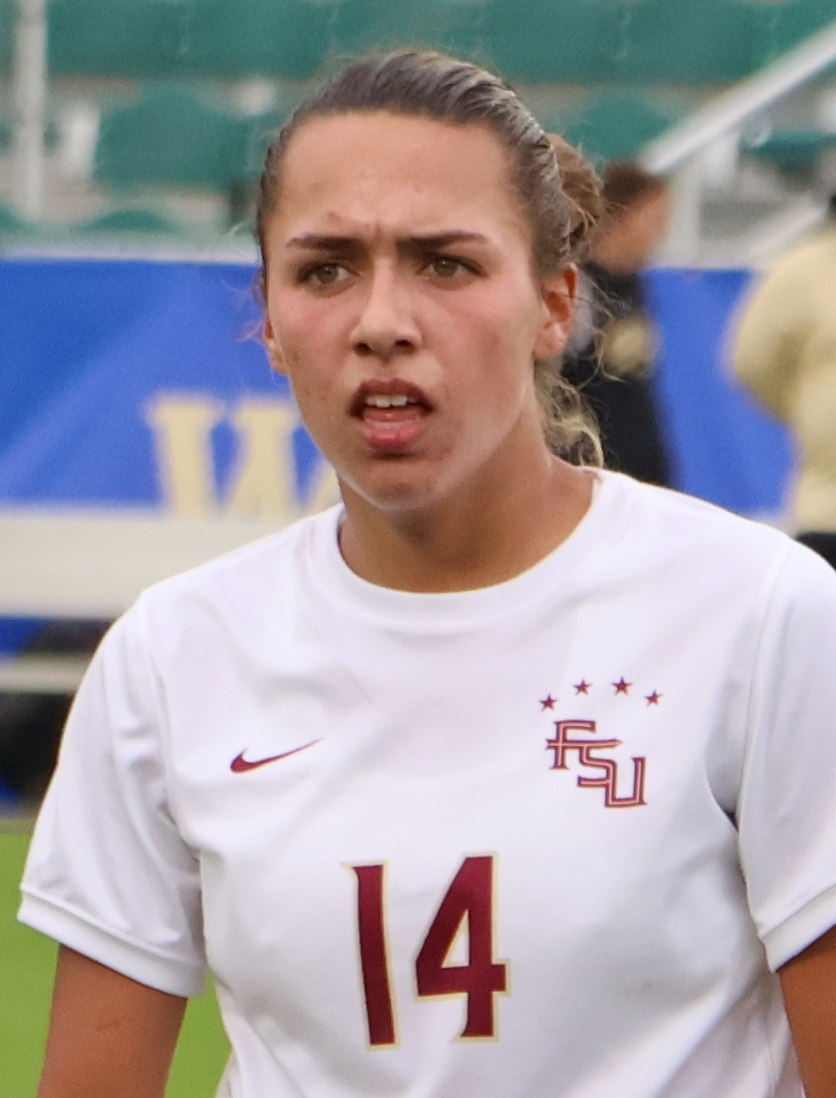
- Boeckmann with Florida State in 2024

Personal information
- Full name: Carissa Marie Boeckmann
- Date of birth: May 23, 2003 (age 23)
- Place of birth: San Antonio, Texas, U.S.
- Height: 5 ft 5 in (1.65 m)
- Position: Midfielder

Team information
- Current team: Dallas Trinity
- Number: 28

Youth career
- 2013–2021: Classics Elite SA

College career
Years	Team	Apps	(Gls)
2021–2023	Texas A&M Aggies	61	(6)
2024	Florida State Seminoles	21	(1)

Senior career*
Years	Team	Apps	(Gls)
2022–2023	Tampa Bay United	17	(12)
2025	Portland Thorns	0	(0)
2025–2026	Benfica	5	(1)
2026–	Dallas Trinity	1	(0)
- * Club domestic league appearances and goals as of August 15, 2026

Carissa Marie Boeckmann (born May 23, 2003) is an American professional soccer player who plays as a midfielder for USL Super League club Dallas Trinity. She played college soccer for the Texas A&M Aggies and the Florida State Seminoles.

== Early life ==
Boeckmann was born and raised in San Antonio, Texas. She has a twin brother and older sister and began playing soccer when she was about four. She attended Incarnate Word High School in San Antonio, before transferring to Antonian College Preparatory High School in Castle Hills, where she earned TAPPS first-team all-state honors twice. She club soccer for Classics Elite Soccer Academy and was named ECNL all-conference four times. She committed to Texas A&M before her junior year.

== College career ==
Boeckmann played in all 18 games, starting 4, and scored 2 goals for Texas A&M Aggies as a freshman in 2021. She played in all 21 games, starting 15, and scored 2 goals as a sophomore in 2022. In her junior year in 2023, she played in all 22 games, making 11 starts, and scored 2 goals. In 2023, the Aggies made the SEC tournament semifinals and the NCAA tournament second round. She also played for Tampa Bay United in the USL W League during the summer in 2023, leading the team with 10 goals in 11 games and being named the Southeast Division Player of the Year.

Boeckmann then transferred to the defending national champion Florida State Seminoles. She started all 21 games and scored 1 goal for the Seminoles in 2024. She helped the team win their fifth consecutive ACC tournament and earn a one seed in the NCAA tournament, but was one of two Florida State players whose penalty attempts were saved in their shootout loss in the second round.

== Club career ==
=== Portland Thorns ===
National Women's Soccer League (NWSL) club Portland Thorns announced on February 16, 2025, that they had signed Boeckmann to her first professional contract on a one-year deal. She was a depth piece behind midfielders such as Sam Coffey and Jessie Fleming. On May 24, she made her professional debut against Club América in the 3–0 win for third place at the CONCACAF W Champions Cup, starting and assisting the opening goal by Pietra Tordin.

=== Benfica ===
On September 6, 2025, Boeckmann was transferred to Portuguese champions Benfica, signing a two-year contract. She debuted for the club later that month in an 8–0 win against Damaiense, then made her UEFA Women's Champions League debut in a 2–1 loss to Juventus. The following month, she made her first start and scored her first professional goal in a 5–1 win over Marítimo in the Taça da Liga Feminina. She made five Champions League appearances, including one start in a 2–0 loss to Paris FC. She scored one league goal – the last in a 5–0 win over Racing Power – as Benfica won their sixth consecutive league championship.

=== Dallas Trinity ===
In July 2026, Boeckmann signed with USL Super League club Dallas Trinity, returning to her home state. She debuted for the club in the season opener on August 15, setting up Seven Castain's goal in a 1–1 draw with the Tampa Bay Sun.

== Honors and awards ==
Florida State Seminoles

- ACC women's soccer tournament: 2024

Benfica

- Campeonato Nacional Feminino: 2025–26
- Taça de Portugal Feminina: 2025–26

Individual

- USL W League Southeast Player of the Year: 2023
