= Maya Hansen =

Maya Hansen may refer to:

- Maya Hansen (character)
- Maya Hansen (soccer)
