= Mia Oliaro =

American soccer player (born 2005)

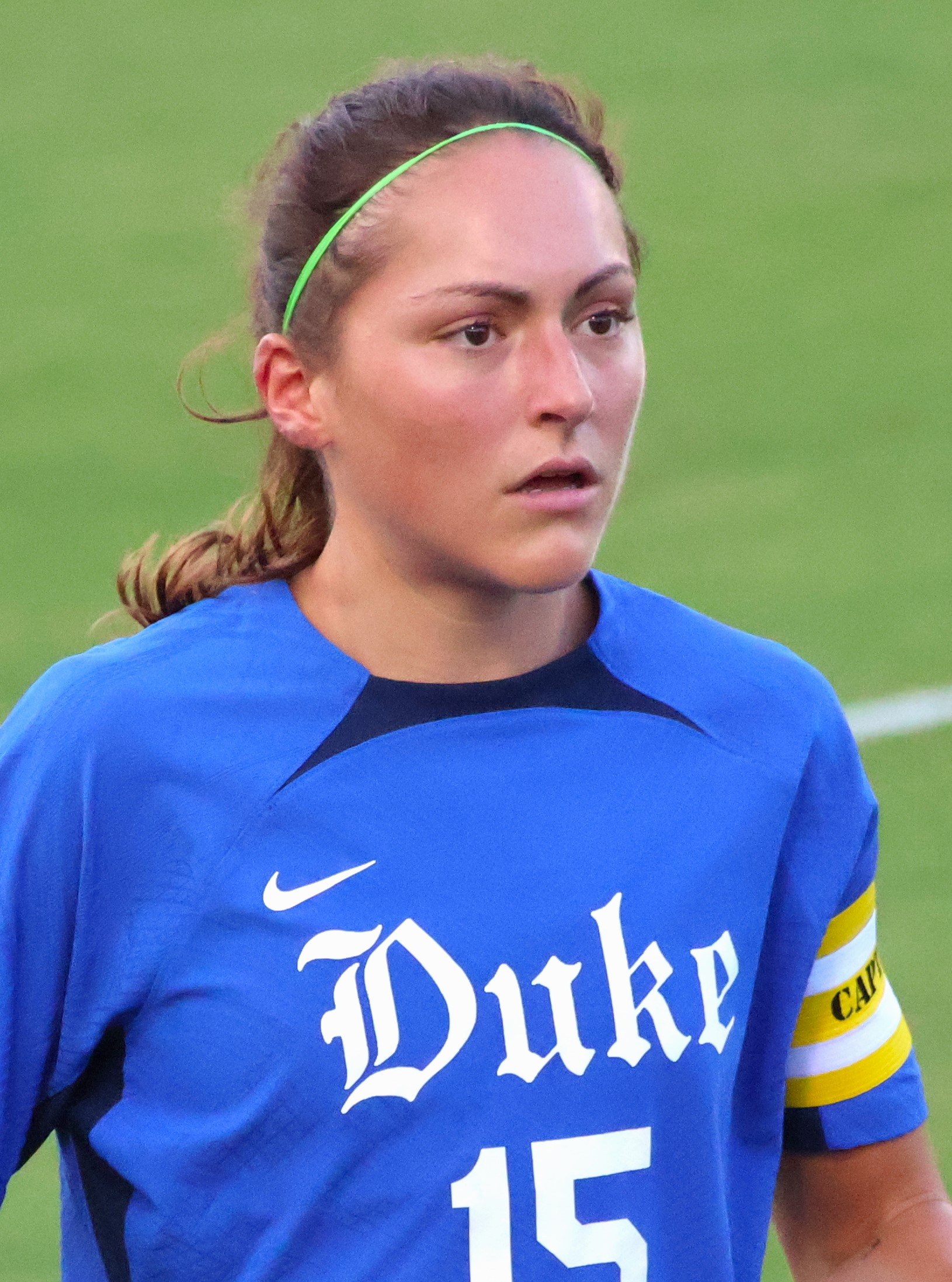
- Oliaro with Duke in 2025

Personal information
- Full name: Mia Katherine Oliaro
- Date of birth: June 27, 2005 (age 21)
- Place of birth: Chapel Hill, North Carolina, United States
- Height: 5 ft 9 in (1.75 m)
- Positions: Midfielder; wingback

Team information
- Current team: Duke Blue Devils
- Number: 15

Youth career
- North Carolina Courage

College career
Years	Team	Apps	(Gls)
2023	North Carolina Tar Heels	20	(1)
2024–	Duke Blue Devils	45	(10)

Senior career*
Years	Team	Apps	(Gls)
2023–2024	North Carolina Courage U23	19	(5)

International career^{‡}
2022	United States U-17	10	(3)
2024	United States U-19	1	(1)
- * Club domestic league appearances and goals as of December 6, 2024 ‡ National team caps and goals as of June 3, 2024

Mia Katherine Oliaro (born June 27, 2005) is an American college soccer player who plays as a midfielder or wingback for the Duke Blue Devils. She previously played for the North Carolina Tar Heels. She has represented the United States at the youth international level.

== Early life ==
Oliaro was born in Chapel Hill, North Carolina, to Scott and Jeri Oliaro, and has a younger brother. Her father, the associate director of sports medicine at the University of North Carolina, played college football at Cornell, and her mother played basketball at American. Oliaro began playing soccer at the YMCA at about age three. She also played other sports growing up, such as lacrosse, basketball, and swimming, in which she won a state championship at age ten. She played soccer two age groups up for Triangle United, where she was coached by her future Duke assistant coach Carla Overbeck.

Oliaro joined the North Carolina Courage Academy while attending Chapel Hill High School, twice receiving ECNL first-team all-conference honors. The summer before college, she played for the North Carolina Courage U23 in the 2023 USL W League season. Oliaro contributed five goals and a team-high six assists as the Courage went undefeated in the regular season and reached the national final, in which she assisted an equalizer in the overtime loss to Indy Eleven. Oliaro was named the league's Young Player of the Year, first-team Team of the Year, and the South Atlantic Division Player of the Year. The next summer, she helped the Courage U23 win the 2024 national title, starting in the final victory over the Colorado Storm.

== College career ==
=== North Carolina Tar Heels ===
Oliaro made 20 appearances as a substitute for the North Carolina Tar Heels as a freshman in 2023, scoring 1 goal with 1 assist. The team went to the NCAA tournament quarterfinals, losing to BYU. After the season, Oliaro entered the NCAA transfer portal, saying North Carolina "just wasn't the right fit for me".

=== Duke Blue Devils ===
Oliaro transferred to the state rival Duke Blue Devils. She started all 22 games for Duke as a sophomore in 2024, helping the team to the national No. 1 ranking and the Atlantic Coast Conference (ACC) regular-season title. She set a program record with goal contributions in nine consecutive games, including a brace against No. 2–ranked Wake Forest to secure the ACC title. Duke earned a one seed in the NCAA tournament and won four shutout wins before losing to the eventual champion Tar Heels in the semifinals. She had 8 goals and 13 assists (joint-second in the nation) and was named second-team All-ACC.

Oliaro became team captain heading into her junior season in 2025. She scored 2 goals and led the team with 12 assists (tied with Kat Rader) in 23 games. Duke again earned a one seed in the NCAA tournament and reached the semifinals, losing this time to Stanford.

== International career ==
Oliaro was first called into training camp with the United States national under-17 team in 2021. She played for the team at the 2022 CONCACAF Women's U-17 Championship, which they won to qualify for the 2022 FIFA U-17 Women's World Cup. Oliaro missed the World Cup due to injury. She trained with the combined under-18/under-19 teams in 2023.

== Honors and awards ==
Duke Blue Devils

- Atlantic Coast Conference: 2024

North Carolina Courage U23

- USL W League: 2024

Individual

- Second-team All-ACC: 2024
- USL W League Young Player of the Year: 2024
