= Charley Boone =

American soccer player (born 2002)

Personal information
- Date of birth: March 26, 2002 (age 24)
- Height: 5 ft 7 in (1.70 m)
- Positions: Defender; midfielder

Youth career
- Crossfire Premier SC

College career
Years	Team	Apps	(Gls)
2020–2021	Gonzaga Bulldogs	2	(0)
2021–2024	Montana Grizzlies	77	(2)

Senior career*
Years	Team	Apps	(Gls)
2025	Minnesota Aurora	11	(0)
2025–2026	Spokane Zephyr	20	(0)
- * Club domestic league appearances and goals as of 22:57, May 18, 2026 (UTC)

Charley Boone (born March 26, 2002) is an American professional soccer player who most recently played as a defender or midfielder for USL Super League club Spokane Zephyr. After spending the bulk of her college soccer career with the Montana Grizzlies, Boone played one season with Minnesota Aurora FC and was named the 2025 USL W League Defender of the Year.

== Early life ==
A native of Seattle, Washington, Boone was born to parents Jeff and Renee Boone. She has a sister, Georgia, with whom she ended up playing three seasons of college soccer at the University of Montana. Boone played club soccer for Crossfire Premier SC, where she was named to the 2019 Surf Cup All-Tournament team. The following year, Boone and Crossfire Premier would win the cup, becoming the second-highest ranked team in the United States. Boone attended Seattle Preparatory School, where, as a freshman, she was named first-team All-Metro. She then transferred to Roosevelt High School and received one conference MVP honor in her senior year.

== College career ==
=== Gonzaga Bulldogs ===
Boone played one season for the Gonzaga Bulldogs after leaving high school. She had difficulty breaking into Gonzaga's squad and ended up only playing 7 minutes in 2 appearances across the season. At the end of the campaign, Boone opted to enter the NCAA transfer portal in search of other opportunities.

=== Montana Grizzlies ===
Boone, who has multiple familial connections to the state of Montana, ultimately chose to transfer to the University of Montana ahead of the 2021 fall season. In her first season with the Lady Griz, she appeared in 19 matches, mostly as a substitute. Despite often finding herself on the bench, Boone still managed to make an impact on the team. In her second-ever career start, she scored the 87th-minute game-winner in the 2021 Big Sky semifinal match. The Grizzlies would go on to win the championship title and then advance to the NCAA tournament, where they were defeated by Washington State in the first round. Boone received the starting nod for both matches. At the end of her sophomore college season, Boone was named the Grizzlies' Newcomer of the Year and also earned a spot on the Big Sky All-Tournament team.

The following season, Boone cemented herself as a staple in Montana's squad. She started all 20 of the Grizzlies' matches at center back and played all but 44 minutes of the campaign. Boone reached greater heights as a senior, receiving recognition on the All-Big Sky First Team and as the Montana defensive MVP. She led the team in minutes as the Grizzlies posted the best defensive season in Big Sky history, conceding only 9 goals in 19 matches.

Boone returned to Montana for a fifth year of soccer as she simultaneously pursued a Master's degree in business. She ended up playing every minute of the season as the Grizzlies' team captain. For the second year in a row, she was named both team defensive MVP and first-team All-Big Sky. Near the end of the season, Boone recorded an assist in Montana's 3–0 win over Weber State that clinched a Big Sky season title for the Grizzlies. In total, she played in 77 matches and scored 2 goals across four seasons at Montana. Boone also found success in the classroom, graduating with Magna cum Laude honors and being named a Big Sky Scholar-Athlete midway through 2025.

== Club career ==
=== Minnesota Aurora ===
After leaving college, Boone joined pre-professional club Minnesota Aurora FC ahead of its 2025 USL W League campaign. In June 2025, she was named to the league's team of the month after strong performances. As the season progressed, Boone cemented her place in the Aurora's lineup, playing in 14 out of the club's 15 games (including all 3 playoff games). She helped the team secure first place in the Heartland Division before advancing to the USL W League semifinals, where the Aurora were defeated by Utah United. At the end of the season, Boone was named the league's Defender of the Year. Her performances with the rest of Minnesota's defensive unit had resulted in 10 total shutouts and only 4 goals conceded across the season.

=== Spokane Zephyr ===
On August 14, 2025, Boone signed her first professional contract with USL Super League club Spokane Zephyr FC. She made her pro debut on September 13, starting and playing 72 minutes in a 2–0 win over reigning champions Tampa Bay Sun FC. The club folded after the season in May 2026.

== Career statistics ==
=== Club ===
As of September 13, 2025

Appearances and goals by club, season and competition
Club	Season	League			Cup		Playoffs		Total	
Club	Season	Division	Apps	Goals	Apps	Goals	Apps	Goals	Apps	Goals
Minnesota Aurora FC	2025	USL W League	11	0	—		4	0	15	0
Spokane Zephyr FC	2025–26	USL Super League	1	0	—		—		1	0
Career total			12	0	0	0	4	0	16	0

== Honors ==
Montana Grizzlies

- Big Sky tournament: 2021
- Big Sky regular-season champions: 2023, 2024

Individual

- Big Sky tournament all-tournament team: 2021
- First-team All-Big Sky: 2023, 2024
- USL W League Defender of the Year: 2025
