= Kaira Houser =

Ecuadorian footballer (born 1997)

Personal information
- Full name: Kaira Joane Houser
- Date of birth: 27 April 1997 (age 29)
- Place of birth: Emporia, Kansas, United States
- Height: 1.65 m (5 ft 5 in)
- Position: Forward

Youth career
- Sporting Blue Valley

College career
Years	Team	Apps	(Gls)
2015–2018	Creighton Bluejays	70	(11)

Senior career*
Years	Team	Apps	(Gls)
2019	Club Ñañas		
2021–2022	ASA Tel Aviv		
2023–2025	KC Courage		
2025–2026	Spokane Zephyr	3	(0)

International career^{‡}
2024	Ecuador	2	(0)
- * Club domestic league appearances and goals as of 05:16, 19 May 2026 (UTC) ‡ National team caps and goals as of 05:16, 19 May 2026 (UTC)

Kaira Joane Houser (born 27 April 1997) is a professional footballer player who most recently played as a forward for USL Super League club Spokane Zephyr. Born in the United States, she represents Ecuador at the international level. She has played college soccer for the Creighton Bluejays.

== Early life ==
Born in Emporia, Kansas, as one of three children to Shane and Matilde Houser, Houser grew up in the town of Wakarusa. She played youth club soccer for Sporting Blue Valley in Kansas City, and also for Washburn Rural High School in Topeka. As a high school freshman, Houser quickly adjusted to becoming an offensive threat. She went on to score 76 career goals, setting a program record, and recorded 48 assists. Many of her goals came in bunches, with Houser logging hat-tricks in multiple years. She helped Washburn reach the semifinals of the Kansas state tournament in 2015, before contributing to a second-place state finish in the final year. Houser marked her career with all-region and first-team all-state honors.

== College career ==
Houser matriculated at Creighton University. As a freshman with the Bluejays in 2015, she registered 4 goals and 1 assist across 19 matches. The following year, she tallied a career-high 4 assists; one of her assists came in a 2–0 victory over St. John's on 9 October 2016, in which she also scored Creighton's other goal. As a junior, Houser participated in all 18 of the Bluejays' games. On 15 October 2017, she beat three defenders in a row to score the 89th-minute game-winner over Villanova. Houser made a career-high 14 starts in her senior season before departing from Creighton.

== Club career ==
In 2019, Houser joined Ecuadorian side Club Ñañas for the Superliga Femenina's first-ever professional season; she had previously played in Ecuador during a study abroad program in 2017, ahead of her junior season of college.

In February 2021, National Women's Soccer League expansion club Kansas City NWSL added Houser to the team's inaugural preseason squad as a trialist. Houer did not make Kansas City's final roster. Instead, she played in Israel for ASA Tel Aviv University for the 2021–22 Ligat Nashim season.

From 2023 to 2025, Houser played for the KC Courage in the pre-professional Women's Premier Soccer League. In her second year with the Courage, she earned All-Heartland Conference honors after finishing the season as the leading goalscorer for both the conference and her team.

USL Super League club Spokane Zephyr FC invited Houser as a preseason trialist ahead of the 2025–26 campaign. Houser made a positive impression on the Zephyr coaching staff in the first two weeks of her trial and was extended a contract offer. On 21 August 2025, Spokane officially announced Houser's signing. Two days later, Houser made her Super League debut, coming in as a second-half substitute for Lena Silano in the Zephyr's season-opening defeat to the Dallas Trinity. She went on to make two more appearances, both of which were as a late-game sub, in her only season with Spokane. The club folded after the season in May 2026.

== International career ==
Houser has been called up to compete for the Ecuador national team in 2021, 2022, and 2024. She made her international debut in February 2024, making a substitute cameo in a 2–0 friendly victory against Uruguay.

== Career statistics ==
=== International ===
As of 20 May 2026

Appearances and goals by national team and year
National team	Year	Apps	Goals
Ecuador	2024	2	0
Total		2	0
