= Madison Cox =

Puerto Rican footballer (born 1995)

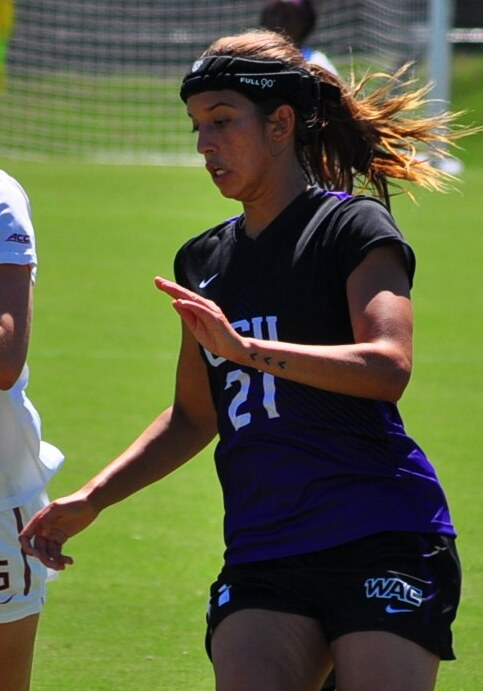
- Cox with Grand Canyon in 2015

Personal information
- Full name: Madison Taylor Cox
- Date of birth: October 24, 1995 (age 31)
- Place of birth: Tampa, Florida, U.S.
- Height: 1.80 m (5 ft 11 in)
- Position: Defender

Team information
- Current team: ZNK Osijek
- Number: 21

College career
Years	Team	Apps	(Gls)
2014	Tampa Spartans	19	(6)
2015–2017	Grand Canyon Antelopes	58	(11)

Senior career*
Years	Team	Apps	(Gls)
2018–	Tampa Bay United		
2022	Tampa Bay Strikers (indoor)		
2024	Lefkothea Latsion FC		(1)
2024–	ŽNK Osijek	14	(2)

International career^{‡}
2021–	Puerto Rico	9	(2)
- * Club domestic league appearances and goals ‡ National team caps and goals as of February 1, 2023

Madison Taylor Cox (born October 24, 1995) is a footballer who plays as a defender for Croatian club ŽNK Osijek. Born in the United States, she plays for the Puerto Rico national team.

== Club career ==
=== Tampa Bay United ===
In 2018, Cox joined Women's Premier Soccer League side Tampa Bay United.

=== Tampa Bay Strikers ===
In August 2022, Cox signed with the women's team of the Tampa Bay Strikers in the National Indoor Soccer League.

=== Lefkothea Latsion FC ===
In January 2024, Cox signed with Lefkothea Latsion FC of Cyprus’ first division.

== International career ==
In June 2021, Cox accepted a call-up to the Puerto Rican women's national football team. On 12 June, she made her debut in a 5–1 friendly loss to Uruguay. In October 2021, Cox scored her first goal for Puerto Rico in a 6–1 friendly victory over Guyana, netting in the 47th minute.

=== International goals ===
As of match played October 23, 2021. Scores and results list Puerto Rico's goal tally first, score column indicates score after each Cox goal.

List of international goals scored by Sophia Cox
No.	Date	Venue	Opponent	Score	Result	Competition
1	October 20, 2021	Juan Ramón Loubriel Stadium, Bayamón, Puerto Rico	Guyana	4–0	6–1	Friendly
2	February 24, 2024	Snapdragon Stadium, San Diego, United States	Panama	1–1	2–1	2024 CONCACAF W Gold Cup
