= 2024 Conference USA women's soccer tournament =

- Classification: Division I
- Teams: 6
- Matches: 5
- Attendance: 730
- Site: FIU Soccer Stadium; Miami, Florida
- Champions: Florida International (1st title)
- Winning coach: Jonathan Garbar (1st title)
- MVP: Noémi Paquin (Offensive); Delinda Sehlin (Defensive) (Florida International)
- Broadcast: ESPN+

2024 Conference USA women's soccer standings
	Conf.						Overall
Team	W		L		T	PCT	W		L		T	PCT
Florida International ‍†‍‡‍^{y}	6	–	1	–	2	.778	13	–	5	–	2	.700
Liberty ‍†‍‍	6	–	1	–	2	.778	15	–	2	–	4	.810
New Mexico St ‍‍‍	5	–	2	–	2	.667	11	–	5	–	3	.658
Sam Houston ‍‍‍	5	–	4	–	0	.556	8	–	8	–	2	.500
Middle Tennessee ‍‍‍	5	–	4	–	0	.556	9	–	10	–	0	.474
Jacksonville State ‍‍‍	3	–	4	–	2	.444	8	–	9	–	2	.474
Kennesaw State ‍‍‍	2	–	4	–	3	.389	3	–	10	–	4	.294
Western Kentucky ‍‍‍	1	–	3	–	5	.389	3	–	8	–	5	.344
UTEP ‍‍‍	2	–	5	–	2	.333	5	–	8	–	4	.412
Louisiana Tech ‍‍‍	0	–	7	–	2	.111	2	–	10	–	5	.265
† – Conference champion ‡ – 2024 C-USA Tournament champion y – Invited to the NCAA Tournament; As of December 10, 2024; Rankings from United Soccer Coaches Poll; Source:Conference USA

The 2024 Conference USA women's soccer tournament was the postseason women's soccer tournament for Conference USA (CUSA) held from November 6–10, 2024. The five-match tournament took place at FIU Soccer Stadium in Miami, Florida. The six-team single-elimination tournament consisted of three rounds based on seeding from regular season conference play. The defending champions, the Liberty Flames, despite being the second overall seed in the tournament. They reached the final where they fell to Florida International 1–0. The conference championship in FIU's first CUSA season was the third overall for the program, with two having been won in the Sun Belt. It was the first title for head coach Jonathan Garbar. As tournament champions, FIU earned CUSA's automatic berth into the 2024 NCAA Division I women's soccer tournament.

== Seeding ==
The top six C-USA teams from the regular season earned berths in the tournament. Teams were seeded by conference record. A tiebreaker was required to determine the first and second seed, which determined who hosted the tournament, as both Florida International and Liberty finished with identical 6–1–2 conference records. Florida International earned the right to host the tournament, and the first seed, by virtue of their 3–0 defeat of Liberty on September 27. Another tiebreaker was required for the fourth and fifth seeds as Middle Tennessee and Sam Houston finished with identical 5–4–0 conference records. The teams met on October 20, and Sam Houston won 2–1, therefore earning the fourth seed.

Seed	School	Conference Record	Points
1	Florida International	6–1–2	20
2	Liberty	6–1–2	20
3	New Mexico St	5–2–2	17
4	Sam Houston	5–4–0	15
5	Middle Tennessee	5–4–0	15
6	Jacksonville State	3–4–2	11

== Bracket ==
Quarterfinals; November 6
4	Sam Houston	0 (2)
5	Middle Tennessee (pen.)	0 (4)
3	New Mexico State	4
6	Jacksonville State	1

Semifinals; November 8
1	Florida International	2
5	Middle Tennessee	0
2	Liberty	1
3	New Mexico State	0

Championship; November 10
1	Florida International	1
2	Liberty	0

== Schedule ==
=== First Round ===
November 6, 2024	#3 New Mexico State	4–1	#6 Jacksonville State	Miami, FL
4:00 p.m. EST	Meredith Scott 20'; Loma McNeese 66', 68'; Shila Rasoul 89'	Report	(yellow card) 48' Alexis Castle; (yellow card) 53' Raylin Dixon; 78' Naroa Domenech	Stadium: FIU Soccer Stadium; Attendance: 40; Referee: Elvis Osmanovic; Assistant referees: Ivan Nobile; Fernando Iturriaga; Fourth official: Shane Butler

November 6, 2024	#4 Sam Houston	0–0 (a.e.t.) (2–4 p)	#5 Middle Tennessee	Miami, FL
7:00 p.m. EST	Solae Young (yellow card) 41'; Andrea Nugent (yellow card) 84'; Hannah Bolin (yellow card) 103'	Report	(yellow card) 35' Sadie Sterbenz; (yellow card) 88' Megan Carroll	Stadium: FIU Soccer Stadium; Attendance: 121; Referee: Tim Debysingh; Assistant referees: Lauren Aldrich; Rafael Sanots; Fourth official: Merrisa Vault
	Penalties
	Landri Townsend (penalty scored); Pam Murray (penalty missed); Kinsey Hill (penalty missed); Jasmine Marquez (penalty scored)		(penalty missed) Emma Brown; (penalty scored) Yana Yordanova; (penalty scored) Lauren Spaanstra; (penalty scored) Sascha Nielsen; (penalty scored) Manon Lebargy

=== Semifinals ===
November 8, 2024	#2 Liberty	1–0	#3 New Mexico State	Miami, FL
4:00 p.m. EST	Ivy Garner 61'	Report	(yellow card) 55' Kennedy Herrera	Stadium: FIU Soccer Stadium; Attendance: 121; Referee: Amin Hadzic; Assistant referees: Corbin Goodyear; Lauren Aldrich; Fourth official: Tim Debysingh

November 8, 2024	#1 Florida International	2–0	#5 Middle Tennessee	Miami, FL
7:00 p.m. EST	Catherine Rapp 24'; Noémi Paquin 76'	Report	(yellow card) 61' Emma Brown; (yellow card) 75' Team; (yellow card) 76' Sadie Sterbenz; (yellow card) 85' Hannah Murphy	Stadium: FIU Soccer Stadium; Attendance: 310; Referee: Servando Berna; Assistant referees: Jake Joyce; Corbin Goodyear; Fourth official: Amin Hadzic

=== Final ===
November 10, 2024	#1 Florida International	1–0	#2 Liberty	Miami, FL
2:00 p.m. EST	Deborah Bien-Aime 47' (pen.); Ashly Martinez (yellow card) 49'; Chinatsu Kaio (yellow card) 82'	Report	(yellow card) 84' Grace Workman	Stadium: FIU Soccer Stadium; Attendance: 438; Referee: Cory Rockwell; Assistant referees: David Nunes; Lauren Aldrich; Fourth official: Tim Debysingh

== Statistics ==
=== Goalscorers ===
There were 9 goals scored in 5 matches, for an average of 1.8 goals per match (as of November 10, 2024).

2 goals

- Loma McNeese – New Mexico State

1 goal

- Deborah Bien-Aime – Florida International
- Naroa Domenech – Jacksonville State
- Ivy Garner – Liberty
- Noémi Paquin – Florida International
- Catherine Rapp – Florida International
- Shila Rasoul – New Mexico State
- Meredith Scott – New Mexico State

== All-Tournament team ==
Player	Team
Deborah Bien-Aime	Florida International
Reagan Bridges	Florida International
Noémi Paquin*	Florida International
Delinda Sehlin^	Florida International
Ivy Garner	Liberty
Sabrina Marks	Liberty
Bri Myers	Liberty
Emma Brown	Middle Tennessee
Demi Gronauer	Middle Tennessee
Loma McNeese	New Mexico State
Meredith Scott	New Mexico State

* Offensive MVP
^ Defensive MVP
