= PDX FC =

American soccer club based in Portland, Oregon

- Full name: PDX Football Club
- Founded: February 13, 2017; 9 years ago
- Stadium: La Salle Catholic High School Stadium
- Coordinates: 45°26′6.8″N 122°35′17.6″W
- Owner: Footy Dreams Group
- Head coach: Jorge Villafaña
- League: Men: United Premier Soccer League; Women: Cascadia Premier League
- Men: 2023: Men: 6th, Northwest Division; Playoffs: DNQ
- Website: www.pdxfc.com
Home colors

PDX Football Club is an American soccer club from Portland, Oregon, United States. The men's club was established in 2017, currently plays in USL League Two, and previously played in the National Premier Soccer League's West Region, Northwest Conference. The women's club was established in 2023 and currently plays in USL W League.

== History ==
PDX FC was founded by Luke Babson, an assistant coach at Western Oregon University, and Max Babson, a media producer for BeIN Sports and the Pac-12 Network. The club was announced as a NPSL expansion team on February 13, 2017, joining the Northwest Conference for the 2017 season. During their inaugural season, the club missed a playoff position by only two points, finishing third in the table.

PDX currently has two championships under their belt, having won the Oregon Open Cup in 2020 and the NISA Independent Cup Pacific Region in 2021. The club also finished 2nd place during the 2021 USL League Two Season

In 2021, PDX joined USL League Two.

On February 13, 2023, USL W League announced PDX FC as an expansion club for the 2023 season. The side competes in the Northwest Division against Lane United FC, Capital FC Atletica, Oly Town FC, and United PDX.

== Club culture ==
=== Supporters ===
The Black Hearts Union supporters' group formed in 2019 to support the then-NPSL side PDX FC, and grew in 2021 when the club began playing in USL2 and became supporter-owned. Most of the supporters group's members are stakeholders in the club. Black Hearts Union joined the Independent Supporters' Council in 2022.

== Year-by-year ==
=== Men ===
Year	League	Regular season (W–L–T)	Playoffs	U.S. Open Cup	Notes
2017	NPSL	3rd, Northwest Conference (5–4–1)	did not qualify	Ineligible	
2018	NPSL	5th, Northwest Conference (2–8–2)	did not qualify	did not qualify	
2019	NPSL	5th, Northwest Conference (2–8–0)	did not qualify	did not qualify	
2020	NPSL	Season cancelled due to COVID-19 pandemic			
2021	USL2	2nd, Northwest Division (7–4–1)	did not qualify	did not qualify	
2022	USL2	6th, Northwest Division (3–8–1)	did not qualify	did not qualify	
2023	USL2	6th, Northwest Division (1–8–3)	did not qualify	did not qualify	

=== Women ===
Year	League	Regular season (W–L–T)	Playoffs	Notes
2023	USLW	4th, Northwest Division (2–6–2)	did not qualify	
