= Maia Tabion =

Personal information
- Full name: Maia Tabion
- Date of birth: April 28, 2004 (age 22)
- Place of birth: O'ahu, Hawaiian Islands
- Height: 5 ft 2 in (1.57 m)
- Position: Attacking midfielder

Team information
- Current team: Cerezo Osaka
- Number: 16

Youth career
- 2016–2022: Crossfire Premier

College career
Years	Team	Apps	(Gls)
2022—2026	Columbia Lions	64	(13)

Senior career*
Years	Team	Apps	(Gls)
2026	Minnesota Aurora	10	(3)
2026–	Cerezo Osaka	6	(0)

International career
2018	United States U14		
2018	United States U15		
2022	United States U18		
- * Club domestic league appearances and goals

Maia Tabion also known as Maia Takeuchi 武内 マイア(born April 24, 2004) is a Japanese-American professional soccer player who currently plays for Cerezo Osaka in the WE League, the top tier of women's football in Japan.

== Personal life ==
She was born in O'ahu to a Japanese mother and a Hawaiian father.

== Youth career ==
Tabion spent the majority of her youth career at Crossfire Premier soccer club in Washington. She is a regular youth international and All American.

In 2021 Tabion gained national recognition scoring a hat-trick in the final of The Dallas Cup at Toyota Stadium, picking up the MVP award live on ESPN.

== College ==
In 2021 she committed to play at Columbia University. She scored on her début, a 2–2 draw with St John's on August 27, 2022. The following week she was named Ivy League Rookie of the week, with goals against Stony Brook. and Fordham. After registering an assist against Cornell on September 25, Tabion was named Ivy League Rookie of the Week for the second time in three weeks. On November 2, Tabion was named in Top Drawer Soccer's Top 100 Freshmen for 2022.

== Senior career ==
Upon graduating from Columbia University, Tabion signed for Minnesota Aurora in the USLW. After a successful trial, it was announced on July 23, 2026, Tabion would sign a two-year contract with Cerezo Osaka in the WE League, the top division of women's football in Japan.

== International ==
In February 2018, she was called up to the United States U14 to a training camp in Norco, California, in May for the training camp in Chula Vista and July in Colorado. In 2018 she played a pivotal role at the CONCACAF Girls' Under-15 Championship, representing USA, making appearances against Jamaica, El Salvador, Portugal and Mexico respectively. In 2021 Tabion was called up to the United States U18 squad. She holds dual citizenship of United States and Japan.

== Career statistics ==
=== Club ===
As of match played November 3, 2026

Appearances and goals by club, season and competition
Club	Season	League			National Cup (Note: Includes appearances in the Empress's Cup)		Continental		Other (Note: Includes appearances in the WE League Cup)		Total	
Club	Season	Division	Apps	Goals	Apps	Goals	Apps	Goals	Apps	Goals	Apps	Goals
Minnesota Aurora	2026	USLW	10	3	0	0	0	0	0	0	10	3
Cerezo Osaka	2026–27	WE League	6	0	0	0	0	0	0	0	6	0
Career total			16	3	0	0	0	0	0	0	16	3

== Honours ==
Team

United States

- CONCACAF Girls' Under-15 Championship

Minnesota Aurora

- USLW 2026

Individual

- 2021 Dallas Cup MVP Award Girls' Invitational by Mary Kay.
- 2021 All American.
- NCAA Ivy League Rookie of the Week, 12 September 2022.
- NCAA Ivy League Rookie of the Week, 26 September 2022.
- Top Drawer Soccer Top 100 Freshmen, 2022.
- NCAA Ivy League Player of the Week, 28 September 2024.
- NCAA Ivy League Offensive Player of the Week, 20 October 2025.
