= Kelsey Oyler =

American soccer player (born 2003)

Personal information
- Full name: Kelsey Marie Oyler
- Date of birth: June 12, 2003 (age 23)
- Place of birth: Meridian, Idaho, U.S.
- Height: 5 ft 7 in (1.70 m)
- Position: Left back

Team information
- Current team: Fort Lauderdale United
- Number: 9

Youth career
- FC Nova

College career
Years	Team	Apps	(Gls)
2021–2023	Gonzaga Bulldogs	58	(6)
2024	Arkansas Razorbacks	20	(0)

Senior career*
Years	Team	Apps	(Gls)
2023	Utah Avalanche	1	(1)
2025–2026	Spokane Zephyr	27	(0)
2026–	Fort Lauderdale United	0	(0)
- * Club domestic league appearances and goals as of 23:01, May 18, 2026 (UTC)

Kelsey Marie Oyler (born June 12, 2003) is an American professional soccer player who plays as a left back for USL Super League club Fort Lauderdale United FC. She played college soccer for the Gonzaga Bulldogs and the Arkansas Razorbacks, setting the program assist record for the Bulldogs. She has previously played professionally for Spokane Zephyr FC.

== Early life ==
Oyler was born and raised in Meridian, Idaho. She participated in soccer, basketball, and track and field from an early age. At six years old, Oyler moved up an age group in soccer, but her lack of height led to declines in both her playing performance and mental health. Although she later returned to her original age group, Oyler's size resulted in her developing Osgood–Schlatter disease in middle school that plagued both of her knees for five years. The adversity caused her to consider not trying out for the Rocky Mountain High School soccer team.

With encouragement from her mother, Oyler eventually joined Rocky Mountain's squad and went on to have a successful high school career. She contributed to three state titles and won three state Player of the Year awards in as many seasons. She was twice recognized as Idaho's Gatorade Player of the Year and set Rocky Mountain program records with 66 career goals and 69 career assists. She also played youth soccer for ECNL club FC Nova.

== College career ==
=== Gonzaga Bulldogs ===
Oyler committed to Gonzaga University as a high school sophomore. She finished high school a semester early to train with the Bulldogs squad as a practice player for the spring 2021 college season. Once the fall rolled around, Oyler was moved to the active roster and found herself converted from forward to outside back. She had an auspicious start to her collegiate career, scoring in her Gonzaga debut in August 2021. One month later, she was named the West Coast Conference Offensive Player of the Week after netting a game-winning goal to produce a program-record eighth win in a row for the Bulldogs. Her 7 assists in 2021 tied Gonzaga's single-season program record. She was also named to the WCC all-freshman team.

As a sophomore, Oyler started every single of the Bulldogs' matches for the second year in a row; she would also go on to achieve the same feat in her third year at Gonzaga. Before the 2023 season started up, she played for the Utah Avalanche of the pre-professional Women's Premier Soccer League, where she scored a goal in her single regular season appearance.

In her junior year, Oyler posted 12 assists, breaking both Gonzaga's single-season and career assist records. Six of her 2023 assists came in a flurry, as she piled three onto Arizona on September 16 and then another three on San Diego two matches later. She was named a second-team All-American and contributed to Gonzaga's first-ever WCC title.

=== Arkansas Razorbacks ===
Oyler transferred to the University of Arkansas ahead of the 2024 season, where she started all but one of her 20 appearances for the Razorbacks. She tallied two assists in each of her third and fourth Arkansas games, including in a match against her former team, Gonzaga. She helped the Razorbacks reach the NCAA Tournament Sweet 16, where they were eliminated by Stanford.

== Club career ==
=== Spokane Zephyr ===
Oyler spent the 2025 NWSL preseason as a non-roster trialist for Portland Thorns FC, and later, Racing Louisville FC. She did not make either team's final squad.

On July 9, 2025, Oyler was announced to have signed her first professional contract with USL Super League club Spokane Zephyr FC. She made her pro debut on August 23, starting in the Zephyr's season-opening loss to the Dallas Trinity. On September 13, she recorded her first goal contribution for Spokane, assisting Lena Silano in a 2–1 victory over reigning champions Tampa Bay Sun FC. The club folded after the season in May 2026.

=== Fort Lauderdale United ===
In July 2026, Oyler joined fellow Super League side Fort Lauderdale United FC. She debuted for Fort Lauderdale on August 16, playing the entirety of the club's season-opening loss to Sporting Club Jacksonville. She was named to the August 2026 USL Super League Team of the Month after showing positive performances in her first two matches with Fort Lauderdale.

== Honors and awards ==
Gonzaga Bulldogs

- West Coast Conference regular-season champions: 2023

Individual

- Second-team All-American: 2023
- First-team all-WCC: 2023
- WCC all-freshman team: 2021
- All-WCC honorable mention: 2022
