= Samantha Dewey =

American soccer player

Personal information
- Date of birth: February 20, 1997 (age 29)
- Place of birth: Fairland, Indiana, United States
- Height: 1.67 m (5 ft 6 in)
- Position: Midfielder

Team information
- Current team: SC Heerenveen

College career
Years	Team	Apps	(Gls)
2015–2019	Xavier Musketeers	86	(40)

Senior career*
Years	Team	Apps	(Gls)
2019–2020	Real Betis	2	(0)
2021–	SC Heerenveen	10	(1)
- * Club domestic league appearances and goals

Samantha Dewey (born February 20, 1997) is an American soccer player who plays for SC Heerenveen.

== Early life and education ==
Dewey was born on February 20, 1997. She grew up in Fairland, Indiana and attended Triton Central High School. After graduating, she attended Xavier University.

== Career ==
While studying at Xavier University, Dewey played for the school soccer team. She became 2019 UWS Midwest Player of the Year after scoring 13 goals and providing six assists for the Midwest Conference champion Union. She got the most goals record (257).

After graduating from university, Dewey signed her first professional soccer contract with Spanish team Real Betis. After making only two appearances for Spanish side, Dewey transferred to the Dutch side SC Heerenveen.
