= Minnesota Aurora FC =

- Founded: 2021; 5 years ago
- Stadium: TCO Stadium; Eagan, Minnesota
- Capacity: 6,000
- Head coach: Jen Larrick
- League: USL W League
- 2023: 1st, Heartland Division; Playoffs: Conference Final
- Website: https://www.mnaurora.com/
Home colors	Away colors

Minnesota Aurora FC is an American women's soccer club based in Eagan, Minnesota that plays in the Heartland Division of the USL W League. The club began play in the league's inaugural 2022 season as a founding club. The club is community-owned by 3,080 individuals. The club plays its home games at TCO Stadium in Eagan, Minnesota, the same stadium the Minnesota Vikings use for practice.

== History ==
Minnesota Aurora FC officially sold out their ownership sales on December 15, 2021. The team introduced their coaching staff a few days later, naming Nicole Lukic as the head coach and ensuring the team would be women-led. The team held tryouts during the spring of 2022 and in May the team announced a partnership with local broadcaster WCCO to stream all home games for free. The team held their first game at TCO Stadium on May 26, 2022, against Green Bay Glory. The match resulted in a draw but the Minnesota team drew 5,219 fans. Their first win would be against Kaw Valley on June 2.

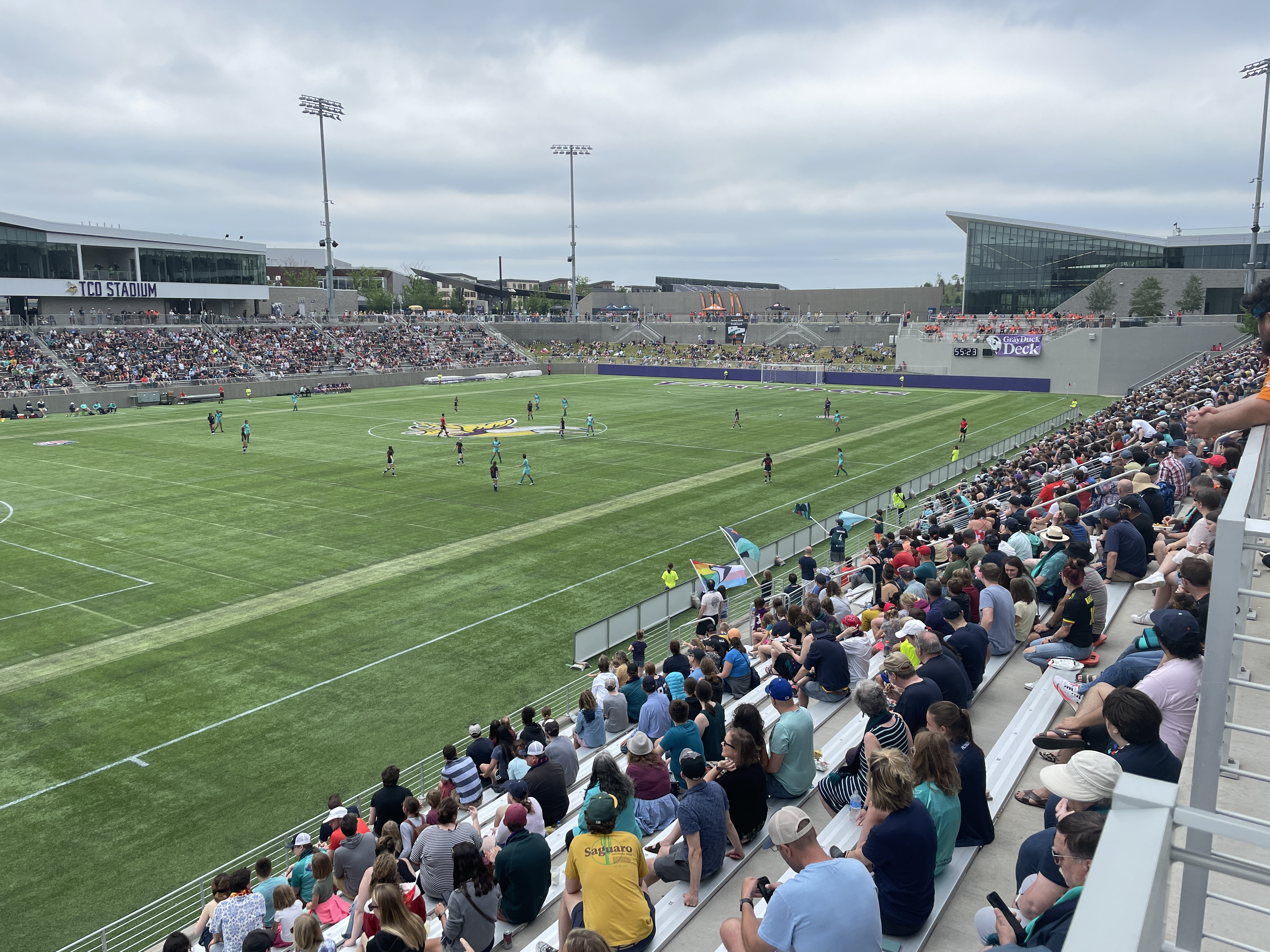
Minnesota Aurora game at TCO Stadium on June 12, 2022

On October 24, 2022, the club sent a letter to its community owners stating an intent to become a fully professional team. The Aurora would continue to play in the USL W League through the 2023 season, possibly moving to National Women's Soccer League (NWSL) or the USL Super League in 2024. The club announced their intent to submit an official expansion bid for the NWSL in November. The team notified its community owners on August 15, 2024, that it would be dropping out of the NWSL bid process due to "circumstances out of [their] control".

== Branding ==
The crest of Minnesota Aurora FC features a stylized Aurora swooping above a forest with a star hanging to the right. The inspiration for the design came from Minnesota's northern geographic identity and nickname of the North Star State. The crest was designed by local designer Nicole Meyer, along with help from colleagues Allie Reinke and Carla Zetina-Yglesias. The crest was originally one of three designs, all of which were voted on by the community members. Other names considered for the new team included Arctic Minnesota and Minnesota Foxfire FC, all designed by Meyer, Reinke, and Zetina-Yglesias.

The kit worn by MN Aurora FC was designed by Cassidy Sepnieski and was revealed on April 9, 2022. Manufactured by Hummel International, the home kit features a dark background with a borealis swirling in the center. The away kit is bright teal, with interlinking stars forming constellations. The goalkeeper kit is "flash red" and also sports the same constellation pattern as the away kit.

== Club culture ==
The club has one supporters' group, named Revontulet (Finnish for Northern Lights), which sits in a designated section at the stadium.

== Players and staff ==
Players who have gone Pro after playing for Minnesota Aurora
Name	Club
(United States) Taylor Kane	(Iceland) Breiðablik (2026–)
(United States) Makenzie Langdok	(Serbia) ŽFK Spartak Subotica (2023-24) (Sweden) Umeå IK (2024-25)
(United States) Sophie French	(United States) Portland Thorns (2022-23) (Denmark) Odense Boldklub Q (2024-25) (Czech Republic) Lokomotiva Brno H. H. (2026)
(United States) Morgan Stone	(Portugal) Damaiense (2024-25) (Portugal) Valadares Gaia (2025) (Portugal) Porto (2026–)
(United States) Arianna Del Moral	(Malta) Birkirkara (2023-24)
(United States) Abby Ostram	(Serbia) ŽFK Spartak Subotica (2023-24) (Finland) Åland United (2024-25)
(United States) Maya Hansen	(Iceland) FH (2025) (United States) Spokane Zephyr (2026–)
(United States) Tianna Harris	(France) FC Fleury 91 (2023-24) (Portugal) Damaiense (2024-25)
(United States) Morgan Turner	(Portugal) SCU Torrense (2022-23)
(United States) Kelsey Kaufusi	(United States) Portland Thorns (2024)
(United States) Ava Bjorkman-Tracy	(Australia) Grange Thistle FC (2025)
(United States) Evelyn Calhoon	(Australia) Queensland Lions FC (2026–)
(United States) Natalie Tavana	(Portugal) Gil Vicente F.C. (2025)
(United States) Cat Rapp	(United States) Spokane Zephyr (2026–)
(United States) Vienna Behnke	(Iceland) Knattspyrnufélagið Haukar (2017-2021) (Iceland) Fylkir WFC (2022) (Greece) Nees Atrimitou (2023-24)
(United States) Annie Williams	(United States) Brooklyn FC (2025–)
(United States) Katie Duong	[[Brooklyn FC (2024)| (United States) ]] DC Power (2024-25) (Iceland) Breiðablik (2026–)
(United States) Kelis Barton	(England) Rugby Borough (2024-25) (Republic of Ireland) Athlone Town (2026–)
(United States) Nadia Cooper	(United States) Houston Dash (2025)
(United States) Charley Boone	(United States) Spokane Zephyr (2025–)
(United States) Addy Weichers	(Canada) Halifax Tides (2025–)
(United States) Julia Sattler	(Croatia) ZNK Split (2024)
(United States) Stella Lawson	(New Zealand) Auckland United (2026–)
(United States) Gracie Dunaway	(Republic of Ireland) Sligo Rovers (2026–)
(United States) Olivia Rush	(Republic of Ireland) Sligo Rovers (2026–)
(United States) Haylee Mersereau	(Republic of Ireland) Sligo Rovers (2026–)
(United States) (Japan) Maia Tabion	(Japan) Cerezo Osaka (2026–)
(Canada) Flavie Dubé	(Czech Republic) Viktoria Plzeň (2026–)
(United States) Hannah Boughton	(Canada) Calgary Wild (2026–)

=== Management ===
Coaching staff

- Jen Larrick – head coach
- Melanie Thomas – assistant coach
- Lydia Ruppert – assistant coach
- Cody Cropper – goalkeeper coach

== Record ==
=== Year-by-year ===
As of June 29, 2026

Season	USL W League								Playoffs	Top Scorer		Head coach
Season	P	W	L	D	GF	GA	Pts	Pos	Playoffs	Player	Goals	Head coach
2022	12	11	0	1	35	8	34	1st, Heartland	League Final	(United States) Morgan Turner	6	(United States) Nicole Lukic
2023	12	12	0	0	60	4	36	1st, Heartland	Conference Final	(United States) Maya Hansen	12	(United States) Nicole Lukic
2024	12	10	0	2	61	6	32	1st, Heartland	First Round	(United States) Katie Duong	9	(United States) Colette Montgomery
2025	12	10	0	2	29	4	32	1st, Heartland	Semifinals	(United States) Natalie Tavana	7	(United States) Jennifer Larrick
2026	12	12	0	0	37	1	36	1st, Heartland	Semifinals	(Japan) Ai Kitagawa	11	(United States) Jennifer Larrick

=== Head coaches ===
- Includes Regular Season and Playoffs. Excludes friendlies.

As of June 29, 2026

Coach	Nationality	Start	End	Games	Win	Loss	Draw	Win %
Nicole Lukic	United States	October 16, 2021	April 7, 2024	29	26	2	1	89.66
Collette Montgomery	United States	April 8, 2024	January 6, 2025	13	10	1	2	76.92
Jen Larrick	United States	January 7, 2025	Present	29	26	1	2	89.66

== Honors ==
- USL W League
  - Regular Season Champions (3): 2022, 2023, 2026
  - Central Conference Champions (2): 2025, 2026
  - Heartland Division Champions (5): 2022, 2023, 2024, 2025, 2026

=== Player honors ===
Year	Player	Country	Position	Honor
2022	Kenzie Langdok	United States	Defender	Team of the Month-June
2022	Mariah Nguyen	United States	Midfielder	Team of the Month-June
2022	Kenzie Langdok	United States	Defender	All-League First Team
2022	Kelsey Kaufusi	United States	Defender	All-League Second Team
2022	Sarah Fuller	United States	Goalkeeper	All-League Second Team
2022	Addy Symonds	United States	Midfielder	Goal of the Year
2023	Tianna Harris	Canada	Defender	Team of the Month-May Captain
2023	Hannah Adler	United States	Midfielder	Team of the Month-June
2023	Tianna Harris	Canada	Defender	Defender of the Year
2023	Tianna Harris	Canada	Defender	All-League First Team
2023	Hannah Adler	United States	Midfielder	All-League Second Team
2023	Maya Hansen	United States	Forward	Divisional Player of the Year-Heartland
2024	Mariah Nguyen	United States	Midfielder	Team of the Month-May
2024	Katie Duong	United States	Midfielder	Team of the Month-June
2024	Katie Duong	United States	Midfielder	Player of the Month
2024	Katie Duong	United States	Midfielder	All-League First Team
2024	Katie Duong	United States	Midfielder	Divisional Player of the Year-Heartland
2025	Catherine Rapp	United States	Midfielder	Team of the Month-May
2025	Charley Boone	United States	Defender	Team of the Month-June
2025	Charley Boone	United States	Defender	Defender of the Year
2025	Charley Boone	United States	Defender	All-League First Team
2025	Catherine Rapp	United States	Midfielder	All-League Second Team
2025	Charley Boone	United States	Defender	Divisional Player of the Year-Heartland
