= Aliana Vakaloloma =

Fijian footballer (born 2008)

Personal information
- Full name: Aliana Amelia Ilse Vakaloloma
- Date of birth: 13 October 2008 (age 18)
- Place of birth: Spokane, Washington, United States
- Height: 1.70 m (5 ft 7 in)
- Position: Goalkeeper

Youth career
- Spokane Shadow

Senior career*
| Years | Team | Apps | (Gls) |
| 2025–2026 | Spokane Zephyr | 0 | (0) |
| 2026 | Spokane Shadow | – | (–) |

International career^{‡}
| 2024 | Fiji U20 | 5 | (0) |
| 2024 | Fiji U16 | 3 | (0) |
| 2025 | Fiji U19 | 3 | (0) |
| 2026– | Fiji | 1 | (0) |
- * Club domestic league appearances and goals as of 17:41, 14 February 2026 (UTC) ‡ National team caps and goals as of 17:41, 7 June 2026 (UTC)

Aliana Amelia Ilse Vakaloloma (born 13 October 2008) is a footballer who plays as a goalkeeper. Born in the United States, she plays for the Fiji national team. At age 15, she was the youngest player to play at the 2024 FIFA U-20 Women's World Cup. She is committed to play college soccer for the Seattle Redhawks.

== Early life ==
Born and raised in Spokane County, Washington, Vakaloloma started playing football at a young age and later joined local club team Spokane Shadow 08. As a freshman at Ridgeline High School, she recorded the best goals against average in the Greater Spokane League and was one of only two freshman to be named to the all-league second team at the end of the year. The following year, she helped Ridgeline capture a district title and advance to the Washington state tournament. Vakaloloma missed all but one match of her junior year due to international duty and commitments with the Spokane Zephyr, but returned in 2026 for her senior season.

== Club career ==
In the second half of 2025, Vakaloloma began training with local USL Super League team Spokane Zephyr FC. On 19 December 2025, the Zephyr announced that they had signed Vakaloloma to a USL academy contract, allowing her to retain her college eligibility. She became the first-ever under-18 player in Zephyr club history. The club folded after the season in May 2026. The following month, Vakaloloma announced her verbal commitment to play college soccer for the Seattle Redhawks.

Later in 2026, Vakaloloma competed for the Women's Premier Soccer League division of Spokane Shadow. She was named to the all-conference and all-region first teams, in addition to being named the Pac Northwest Conference's Goalkeeper of the Year.

== International career ==
=== Youth ===
Vakaloloma was monitored by Fiji under-20 national team coach Angeline Chua throughout 2024. In August 2024, Vakaloloma was called up to the squad for the first time. She made her U20 debut two weeks later, playing in a friendly match against Costa Rica at 15 years of age. She conceded two goals in the 2–0 loss, but also managed to make several saves. Vakaloloma also performed well in Fiji's following match, a friendly against Morocco. She then traveled with the U20s to the 2024 FIFA U-20 Women's World Cup, Fiji's first appearance at any age level in a FIFA women's tournament. Still age 15, Vakaloloma was the youngest player in the competition. She went on to start all three of Fiji's matches, conceding 29 goals as Fiji were soundly defeated in a series of lopsided scorelines. Still, Vakaloloma contributed multiple saves throughout the tournament to prevent her team from suffering harsher losses.

Later in 2024, Vakaloloma was one of three players from Fiji's U20 World Cup squad to play at the OFC U-16 Women's Championship. On 11 September, she helped Fiji record its first win of the tournament, a 2–0 victory over the Cook Islands. The following year, Vakaloloma competed for Fiji at the 2025 OFC U-19 Women's Championship, which Fiji finished in third place. In her team's final match of the tournament, a win against the Cook Islands on penalties, Vakaloloma played all 90 minutes of regulation time before being subbed out for Ka'iulani Scott ahead of the shootout.

=== Senior ===
Vakaloloma earned her first senior international cap with Fiji on 6 June 2026, by starting and playing the full 90 minutes in a friendly against Hong Kong.

== Personal life ==
Vakaloloma is the daughter of Isimeli and Tiffany Vakaloloma. She has Fijian ancestry through her father, who moved from Fiji to the United States in 1994. Her roots trace back to Buca Village in Fiji's Cakaudrove Province on Vanua Levu.
