= North Carolina FC Youth =

Youth soccer club in Raleigh, North Carolina

North Carolina FC Youth (NCFC Youth) is an American soccer club and eponymous league based in Raleigh, North Carolina, and serving the greater Research Triangle. It is the largest youth-to-professional soccer club in the country.

== Club ==
NCFC Youth was founded as Capital Area Soccer League (CASL) in 1974 as a not-for-profit organization and provides recreational and competitive programs for youth in the greater Raleigh-Durham-Chapel Hill metropolitan area. NCFC Youth offers teams in all divisions of North Carolina youth soccer including "classic" (first tier competitive teams in US regional and statewide leagues), "challenge" (second tier competitive teams locally), and recreational soccer. NCFC Youth "classic" teams compete at the highest level of competition in the nation including Elite Clubs National League, Region III Premier League, and U.S. Soccer Development Academy in partnership with the North Carolina FC. They utilize venues throughout the area including WakeMed Soccer Park in Cary, and the WRAL Soccer Center in Raleigh. NCFC Youth sends many players on to play collegiately each year, including NCAA Division I and local NCAA Division II and NCAA Division III schools.

=== Merger with North Carolina FC ===
On March 10, 2017, North Carolina FC announced that it would be merging CASL and TFC Alliance, two of the largest youth clubs in the Raleigh area, and they would become part of the NCFC family as North Carolina FC Youth soccer.

== League ==
In addition to recreational divisions which include only club teams, North Carolina FC Youth serves as a league organizer for competitive leagues in the Research Triangle area of North Carolina.

=== Professional alumni ===
Player	College	Professional and international teams
Nazmi Albadawi	NC State Wolfpack	North Carolina FC, FC Cincinnati
Joanna Boyles	North Carolina Tar Heels	Chicago Red Stars, Orlando Pride
Maycee Bell	North Carolina Tar Heels	NJ/NY Gotham FC, North Carolina Courage
Cameron Castleberry	North Carolina Tar Heels	Washington Spirit
Steven Curfman	Wake Forest Demon Deacons	Real Salt Lake, Carolina RailHawks, Wilmington Hammerheads FC
Christina Gibbons	Duke Blue Devils	FC Kansas City, Melbourne Victory FC, Sky Blue FC
Scott Goodwin	North Carolina Tar Heels	Carolina RailHawks, Louisville City FC
Tori Hansen	North Carolina Tar Heels	Orlando Pride, Melbourne Victory FC, Brooklyn FC
Michael Harrington	North Carolina Tar Heels	Sporting Kansas City, Portland Timbers, Colorado Rapids, Chicago Fire, North Carolina FC
Alexandra Kimball	North Carolina Tar Heels	Utah Royals FC
Forrest Lasso	Wofford Terriers	FC Cincinnati, Nashville SC, Tampa Bay Rowdies, GIF Sundsvall
Emily Moxley	North Carolina Tar Heels	Carolina Ascent FC
Casey Nogueira	North Carolina Tar Heels	Chicago Red Stars, Sky Blue FC, FC Kansas City, United States women's national team
Logan Pause	North Carolina Tar Heels	Chicago Fire
Brianna Pinto	North Carolina Tar Heels	NJ/NY Gotham FC, North Carolina Courage
Morgan Reid	Duke Blue Devils	North Carolina Courage, Orlando Pride
Alexis Shaffer	Virginia Cavaliers	FC Kansas City
Haleigh Stackpole	Ole Miss Rebels	North Carolina Courage, SK Slavia Prague
Claire Wagner	Clemson Tigers	North Carolina Courage

== See also ==
- North Carolina FC
- North Carolina Courage
- North Carolina FC U23
- North Carolina Courage U23
