= WRAL Soccer Center =

Soccer complex in Raleigh, North Carolina

- Interactive map of WRAL Soccer Center
- Location: Raleigh, North Carolina
- Coordinates: 35.884689°N 78.54818°W
- Operator: North Carolina FC
- Capacity: 3,200
- Surface: Artificial grassy turf

Construction
- Groundbreaking: 1980
- Opened: 1981

Tenants
- North Carolina FC Youth Teams; Del Sol FC (UPSL) (2018–present)

The WRAL Soccer Center is a soccer complex featuring a 3,200-seat, lighted soccer-specific stadium located on Perry Creek Road in Raleigh, North Carolina. It is situated between Capital Boulevard (US Route 1) and Louisburg Road (NC Route 401), and just north of Interstate 540. The complex features a total of 25 soccer pitches. Two of the 25 fields are configurable into smaller pitches and are composed of FieldTurf. The stadium is located in the middle of the park.

The site is the home field for the North Carolina FC Youth, which is one of the largest youth soccer organizations in North Carolina. The central stadium is home to the Wake Technical Community College soccer team. It is also the site for several large youth soccer tournaments, including four weekends in November and December every year when the North Carolina FC Youth Shootout and the North Carolina FC Yough Showcase events are hosted.
