= Hannah Adler =

American women's traditional and beach soccer player

Personal information
- Full name: Hannah Madison Adler
- Date of birth: January 23, 1998 (age 28)
- Place of birth: Oak Park, California, U.S.
- Height: 5 ft 5 in (1.65 m)
- Position: Forward

Team information
- Current team: Cali Beach Soccer Club

Youth career
- Real So Cal

College career
Years	Team	Apps	(Gls)
2017–2019	University of Denver	81	(25)

Senior career*
Years	Team	Apps	(Gls)
2020	Bnot Netanya		
2021	Aalborg BK		
2021	HB Køge		
2022	Racing Louisville FC	4	(0)
2023	Minnesota Aurora FC		
2023–	Cali BSC	60	(17)

International career
2023–	United States (beach soccer)	18	(14)
- * Club domestic league appearances and goals

Hannah Madison Adler (born January 23, 1998) is an American beach soccer and association football player who plays as a forward for Cali Beach Soccer Club and the United States women's national beach soccer team. She was named U.S. Women’s Beach Soccer Player of the Year in 2023 and 2024. Adler previously played professional grass soccer in the National Women's Soccer League (NWSL) for Racing Louisville FC, in Denmark for HB Køge and Aalborg BK, and in Israel for Hapoel Ra'anana. She co-founded Beyond the Baller, a women’s soccer lifestyle brand, with professional player Cheyenne Shorts.

== Early life ==
Hannah Adler was born on January 23, 1998, in Oak Park, California. She began playing soccer at age six, competing for Real So Cal (now LAFC So Cal) and Oak Park High School’s varsity team.

== College career ==
At the University of Denver, she played for the Pioneers from 2017 to 2019, serving as team captain and earning Summit League First Team honors in 2017, 2018, and 2019, as well as United Soccer Coaches All-West Region in 2018. Over four seasons, she scored 25 goals and recorded 18 assists, contributing to two NCAA Tournament appearances.

== Club career ==
=== Grass soccer ===
After college, Adler played professionally in Israel with Bnot Netanyah F.C. in 2020. In 2021, she joined Danish club Aalborg BK before moving to HB Køge, a UEFA Women’s Champions League participant. In 2022, she signed with Racing Louisville FC in the National Women's Soccer League (NWSL), making four appearances. In 2023, Adler played for Minnesota Aurora FC in the USL W League.

=== Beach soccer ===
Adler transitioned to beach soccer in 2023, joining Cali Beach Soccer Club as a defender, which was ranked third in the world in 2024. Cali BSC won the USGC/NBSL Fort Lauderdale Open as part of the National Beach soccer League women’s pro division. Adler won the Golden Toe Award and rising star as part of the competition.

== International career ==
Adler debuted for the United States women's national beach soccer team in 2023 as a forward, earning a training camp call-up in February. She played nine matches that year, scoring nine goals, including braces against Trinidad and Tobago and England during the ANOC World Beach Games Qualifying and Women’s Mundialito in Spain, respectively. Her performances earned her the 2023 U.S. Women’s Beach Soccer Player of the Year award with 40.5% of the weighted vote. In 2024, Adler scored five goals and recorded two assists in six appearances, contributing to a second-place finish at the Acapulco Cup and a title defense at the El Salvador Beach Soccer Cup. She was named Player of the Year again in 2024. She competed in the 2025 El Salvador Beach Soccer Cup against Switzerland, Costa Rica, and El Salvador.

== Personal life ==
Adler resides in Santa Barbara, California. In 2022, she co-founded Beyond the Baller, a women’s soccer lifestyle brand, with professional player Cheyenne Shorts, aiming to empower women through soccer. During a break from playing, she developed a passion for coaching, working with youth players.

== Honors ==
=== Beach soccer ===
- U.S. Women’s Beach Soccer Player of the Year: 2023, 2024
- El Salvador Beach Soccer Cup: 2024
- Rising Star: Hannah Adler (Cali BSC) NBSL.
- Golden Toe Award (6 goals): (Cali BSC)

=== Grass soccer ===
- Summit League First Team: 2017, 2018, 2019
- United Soccer Coaches All-West Region: 2018
