= Nicole Lukic =

American soccer coach

Personal information
- Date of birth: 1988 or 1989 (age 37–38)

Team information
- Current team: Chicago Stars (assistant coach)

College career
Years	Team	Apps	(Gls)
2007–2010	Milwaukee Panthers		

Managerial career
- 2013–2018: Wisconsin–La Crosse Eagles (assistant)
- 2022–2023: Minnesota Aurora
- 2025–2026: Spokane Zephyr
- 2026–: Chicago Stars (assistant)

Nicole Lukic is an American professional soccer coach who is an assistant coach for Chicago Stars FC of the National Women's Soccer League (NWSL). She has previously coached Minnesota Aurora FC, where she was named the 2022 USL W League coach of the year, and USL Super League club Spokane Zephyr.

== College career ==
Lukic played four years of college soccer for the Milwaukee Panthers, where she contributed to four consecutive Horizon League championships, three Horizon League tournament titles, and multiple NCAA Division I Tournament appearances. Lukic was unable to play soccer past college due to injuries.

== Coaching career ==
=== Wisconsin–La Crosse Eagles ===
Lukic picked up coaching experience in her youth by volunteering and also worked as an assistant coach for a high school team when she was a freshman at Milwaukee. Despite entering the business world post-college, Lukic was soon drawn back to coaching. In 2013, she became the first-ever full-time assistant coach for the Wisconsin–La Crosse Eagles women's soccer team. Two years later, she was one of fifteen female coaches across the United States named to the United Soccer Coaches 30 under 30 list. After helping the Eagles reach the quarterfinals of the 2017 NCAA tournament, Lukic and the rest of the Wisconsin–La Crosse coaches were named both the Wisconsin Intercollegiate Athletic Conference and the North Region coaching staff of the year. She spent a total of six seasons with the Eagles.

After her time at Wisconsin–La Crosse, Lukic joined Rush Soccer. She worked at Rush as the club's director of operations, managing player selection for over 80 clubs across the United States. Lukic's work also extended to roles on the Wisconsin Women's Soccer Advisory Council and on the boards of Twin Cities Rush, La Crosse Youth Soccer Parents, and the University of Wisconsin-La Crosse Athletic Fundraising.

=== Minnesota Aurora ===
In the summer of 2021, Lukic earned a USSF "A" license. She was subsequently named the inaugural head coach of USL W League club Minnesota Aurora FC. Lukic lead the Aurora to a highly successful first season in which the club went undefeated in the regular season, racking up a +27 goal differential and making it to the championship match of the playoffs. She was named the first-ever USL W League Coach of the Year.

The following season, Lukic juggled both coaching the Aurora's squad and working for the team as sporting director at the same time. Synergizing closely with her trio of assistant coaches, Lukic led the Aurora to yet another unbeaten season and deep playoff run. She was named to the Minneapolis/St. Paul Business Journal's 2024 40 under 40 list.

=== Spokane Zephyr ===
Lukic departed from the Aurora after two seasons. In between Minnesota and her next coaching job, she served for over a year as the United States Soccer Federation's Director of Talent Identification for youth national teams.

On October 7, 2025, Lukic was announced as the new head coach of USL Super League club Spokane Zephyr FC. Her appointment was a midseason hire, as USL Spokane technical director Josh McAllister had served as interim coach for the first eight games of the 2025–26 season while the Zephyr conducted a coaching search. Lukic's first game at the helm was a 2–0 victory against the Dallas Trinity. She then piloted the Zephyr through a six-game winless skid, which included four consecutive losses, before orchestrating a victory over Fort Lauderdale United FC that sent Spokane into the midseason break on a positive note. After the break Lukic hired her own technical staff (the only all female technical staff in the league) and was able to turn the team around. Zephyr ended 10-9-9 under Lukic. Lukic had a 5 game undefeated run at the end of the season and established a clear playing style. Zephyr even broke the club record for most goals scored in a game with a 4-0 victory over Brooklyn FC to end the year. The team missed playoffs by 1 point. The club folded after the season in May 2026.

=== Chicago Stars ===
In August 2026, Lukic was hired as an assistant coach for the Chicago Stars of the National Women's Soccer League, joining Karina Báez's interim staff following the firing of Martin Sjögren.

== Personal life ==
Lukic was raised in Brookfield, Wisconsin. She earned a bachelor's degree in communication and political science at the University of Wisconsin–Milwaukee. She then pursued higher education at Ohio University, obtaining a master's degree in athletic administration.
