= Madelyn Desiano =

American soccer player (born 2000)

Personal information
- Full name: Madelyn Marie Desiano
- Date of birth: February 18, 2000 (age 26)
- Place of birth: Mission Viejo, California
- Height: 5 ft 6 in (1.68 m)
- Position: Defender

Team information
- Current team: Pepperdine Waves (assistant coach)

Youth career
- So Cal Blues

College career
Years	Team	Apps	(Gls)
2018–2022	UCLA Bruins	53	(3)

Senior career*
Years	Team	Apps	(Gls)
2023–2024	Houston Dash	4	(0)
2024–2025	Odense Boldklub Q	21	(0)
2025–2026	Spokane Zephyr	11	(0)

International career
2014	United States U14		
2018	United States U18		
2017	United States U19		

Managerial career
- 2026–: Pepperdine Waves (assistant)
- * Club domestic league appearances and goals

Madelyn Marie Desiano (born February 18, 2000) is an American former professional soccer player who is an assistant coach for the Pepperdine Waves women's soccer team. She played college soccer for the UCLA Bruins, winning the 2022 national championship. She was selected by the Houston Dash with the final pick of the 2023 NWSL Draft. She also played for Danish club Odense Boldklub Q and USL Super League club Spokane Zephyr.

== Early life ==
Desiano was born in Mission Viejo, California and attended Aliso Niguel High School. She was a member of both the soccer and dance teams at Aliso Niguel. She played youth soccer for SoCal Blues, with which she won the 2015 ECNL U15 National Championship.

== College career ==
Desiano attended University of California, Los Angeles (UCLA) and played college soccer for the UCLA Bruins from 2018 to 2022. In 2018, she tore her anterior cruciate ligament (ACL), and underwent knee surgery. In 2019, she underwent a second knee surgery.

Desiano then made her college debut in February 2021. She scored her first collegiate goal on October 6, 2022, against Arizona State. UCLA won the 2022 NCAA Division I women's soccer tournament, as Desiano played all 110 minutes in the championship match.

== Club career ==
=== Houston Dash ===
In January 2023, Desiano was selected by the Houston Dash in the 2023 NWSL Draft. She scored her first professional goal on July 22, 2023, in a 2023 NWSL Challenge Cup match against Kansas City Current. Houston waived Desiano on April 12, 2024.

=== Odense Boldklub Q ===
On August 9, 2024, Desiano signed with Danish club Odense Boldklub Q. Her move to Denmark also reunited her with former UCLA teammate, My Hyland. Desiano made her first start and recorded her first assist for the club on August 31, 2024, against HB Køge, and was named to the Kvindeligaen Team of the Round. Desiano was named to the Kvindeligaen Team of the Month for September 2024. She played 21 league matches in her lone season with OB Q.

=== Spokane Zephyr ===
Desiano returned to the United States in July 2025, signing a contract with Spokane Zephyr FC ahead of the club's second season as a member of the USL Super League. She made her Zephyr debut on August 23, 2025, coming on as a second-half substitute in Spokane's season-opening loss to Dallas Trinity FC. On May 19, 2026, she announced her retirement from professional soccer.

== International career ==
Desiano attended training camp with the United States under-14 team in 2014.

In September 2017, Desiano competed with the United States under-19 team in the CFA International Women's Youth Football Tournament in China. In April 2018, she competed with the United States under-18 team in Switzerland.

== Coaching career ==
In July 2026, after retiring from her playing career, Desiano was hired as an assistant coach for the Pepperdine Waves.

== Personal life ==
Desiano was born to parents Tom, who played college basketball for San Jose State, and Ann-Marie, a competitive dancer who was a cheerleader for Long Beach State.

Desiano wrote a book about her experiences at UCLA; in June 2025, she self-published Bend Never Break, focusing on UCLA's 2022 National Championship.

== Career statistics ==
As of match played December 6, 2025

Appearances and goals by club, season and competition
Club	Season	League			Cup (Note: Includes the NWSL Challenge Cup and Danish Women's Cup)		Playoffs (Note: Includes NWSL Playoffs)		Total	
Club	Season	Division	Apps	Goals	Apps	Goals	Apps	Goals	Apps	Goals
Houston Dash	2023	NWSL	4	0	4	1	—		8	1
Houston Dash	2024	NWSL	0	0	—		—		0	0
Odense Boldklub Q	2024–25	Kvindeligaen	21	0	3	0	—		24	0
Spokane Zephyr FC	2025–26	USLS	10	0	—		—		10	0
Career total			35	0	7	1	0	0	42	1

== Honors ==
UCLA Bruins

- NCAA Division I women's soccer tournament: 2022

Individual

- Kvindeligaen Team of the Month: September 2024
