= Maya Hansen (soccer) =

American soccer player (born 2001)

Personal information
- Full name: Maya Lauren Hansen
- Date of birth: April 9, 2001 (age 25)
- Place of birth: Mundelein, Illinois, U.S.
- Height: 5 ft 4 in (1.63 m)
- Position: Forward

Youth career
- Burnsville Fire SC
- Maple Brook Premier

College career
Years	Team	Apps	(Gls)
2019–2023	South Dakota State Jackrabbits	102	(51)
2024	Iowa Hawkeyes	22	(5)

Senior career*
Years	Team	Apps	(Gls)
2022–2024	Minnesota Aurora	27	(16)
2025	FH	17	(8)
2026	Spokane Zephyr	10	(1)
- * Club domestic league appearances and goals as of 22:57, May 18, 2026 (UTC)

Maya Lauren Hansen (born April 9, 2001) is an American professional soccer player who most recently played as a forward for USL Super League club Spokane Zephyr. She played college soccer for the South Dakota State Jackrabbits, where she set the program record in career goals, and the Iowa Hawkeyes.

== Early life ==
Born in Mundelein, Illinois, Hansen grew up in Burnsville, Minnesota. She played youth soccer for Burnsville Fire SC and Maple Brook Premier. She played three seasons of varsity soccer at Burnsville High School, winning two all-state honors. As a senior, she was Minnesota's Class AA topscorer, her team MVP, and the Burnsville High female athlete of the year. Upon graduation, she had recorded 61 goals and 19 assists for the program.

== College career ==
=== South Dakota State Jackrabbits ===
Hansen committed to South Dakota State University in November of her senior year of high school. In her freshman season with the Jackrabbits, she scored 7 goals, 5 of which were game-winners. In the championship game of the Summit League tournament, she tallied an assist to help South Dakota State eventually clinch the title after a penalty shootout. She was named the Summit League's Freshman of the Year.

In the spring of 2021, Hansen scored 7 goals again, ranking first on her team and third in the Summit League. She registered her first career hat-trick in March 2021 and was subsequently named the league's offensive player of the week. She received her first All-Summit League First Team honor at the end of the season and would go on to repeat the feat in her following two seasons of college as well. Hansen kicked off her third campaign with the Jackrabbits on a positive note, scoring in six consecutive games to start the season. She was named to the All-West Region second team after recording a career-high 14 goals. One of her goals was the game-winner to secure another Summit League championship for her team.

Hansen was named the Summit League's Offensive Player of the Year in 2022. She led the league with 11 goals and also received a spot on the All-West Region first team. In South Dakota State's regular season finale, she tied the program's career goals record with a brace against North Dakota State. Hansen did not take long to break the record, as she scored in the first match of the following season to end any uncertainty. She ended up missing the majority of 2023 after picking up an ACL injury seven games into the season that would ultimately sideline her for approximately 11 months. She also left South Dakota State as third all-time in career assists.

=== Iowa Hawkeyes ===
Hansen transferred to the University of Iowa in 2024, where she played one season for the Hawkeyes as a graduate student. She started off the season in a substitute role before being called on to start the final 8 matches of the season. In the first round of the 2024 NCAA tournament, she scored the Hawkeyes' lone goal against Georgetown to secure a 1–0 victory and passage to the next round, where Iowa's tournament was ended by Virginia Tech. She registered 5 goals and 1 assist across 22 games.

== Club career ==
=== Minnesota Aurora ===
In the summer of 2022, Minnesota Aurora FC head coach Nicole Lukic approached Hansen via email to play for the pre-professional team in the first-ever USL W League season. Hansen accepted the offer and joined the team ahead of her fourth year of college. She started the season off on a positive note, scoring the game-winner that clinched the Aurora's first-ever win in franchise history. It would not be the team's last, as Hansen helped contribute to a season in which Minnesota went undefeated up until a loss to Tormenta FC in the championship match.

Hansen also spent the 2023 season with the Aurora. She led the team with 12 goals as the Aurora posted a perfect 12–0–0 regular season record, going unbeaten once again prior to the playoffs. She returned to Minnesota in 2024, but she was not able to participate in any games as she continued to recover from an injury sustained with South Dakota State the previous year. She made 27 appearances across her two years of active Aurora play.

=== FH ===
In March 2025, Hansen signed her first professional contract with Icelandic Besta deild kvenna club FH. She scored her first pro goal against Knattspyrnufélagið Fram, contributing to a 2–0 win on April 25. FH's reverse fixture against Fram was another successful one for Hansen, who tallied a brace and could have had a hat trick in the 3–1 victory. Her efforts helped FH stay in the title race for a good portion of the season until Breiðablik pulled ahead and clinched the top spot of the league with three rounds to spare. Still, FH fought until the very end, with Hansen scoring a goal in a 3–2 loss to Breiðablik in both teams' final match of the season. She made 26 appearances and scored 13 goals across all competitions in her sole season with FH.

=== Spokane Zephyr ===
On December 22, 2025, Hansen was announced to have signed a contract with Spokane Zephyr FC through the second half of the 2025–26 USL Super League season. The move reunited her with former Minnesota Aurora head coach Nicole Lukic, who had been hired as Zephyr FC head coach less than three months prior to Hansen's arrival. On January 31, 2026, Hansen made her Super League debut, coming on as an 89th-minute substitute in a draw with the Tampa Bay Sun to kick off the second half of Spokane's season. She scored her first goal for the Zephyr on April 25, converting a penalty kick to help Spokane beat Fort Lauderdale United FC. The club folded after the season in May 2026.

== Honors ==
South Dakota State Jackrabbits

- Summit League women's soccer tournament: 2019, 2021

Individual

- First-team All-Summit League: 2020, 2021, 2022
- Summit League Freshman of the Year: 2019
- Summit League Offensive Player of the Year: 2022
