= Lena Silano =

American soccer player (born 2000)

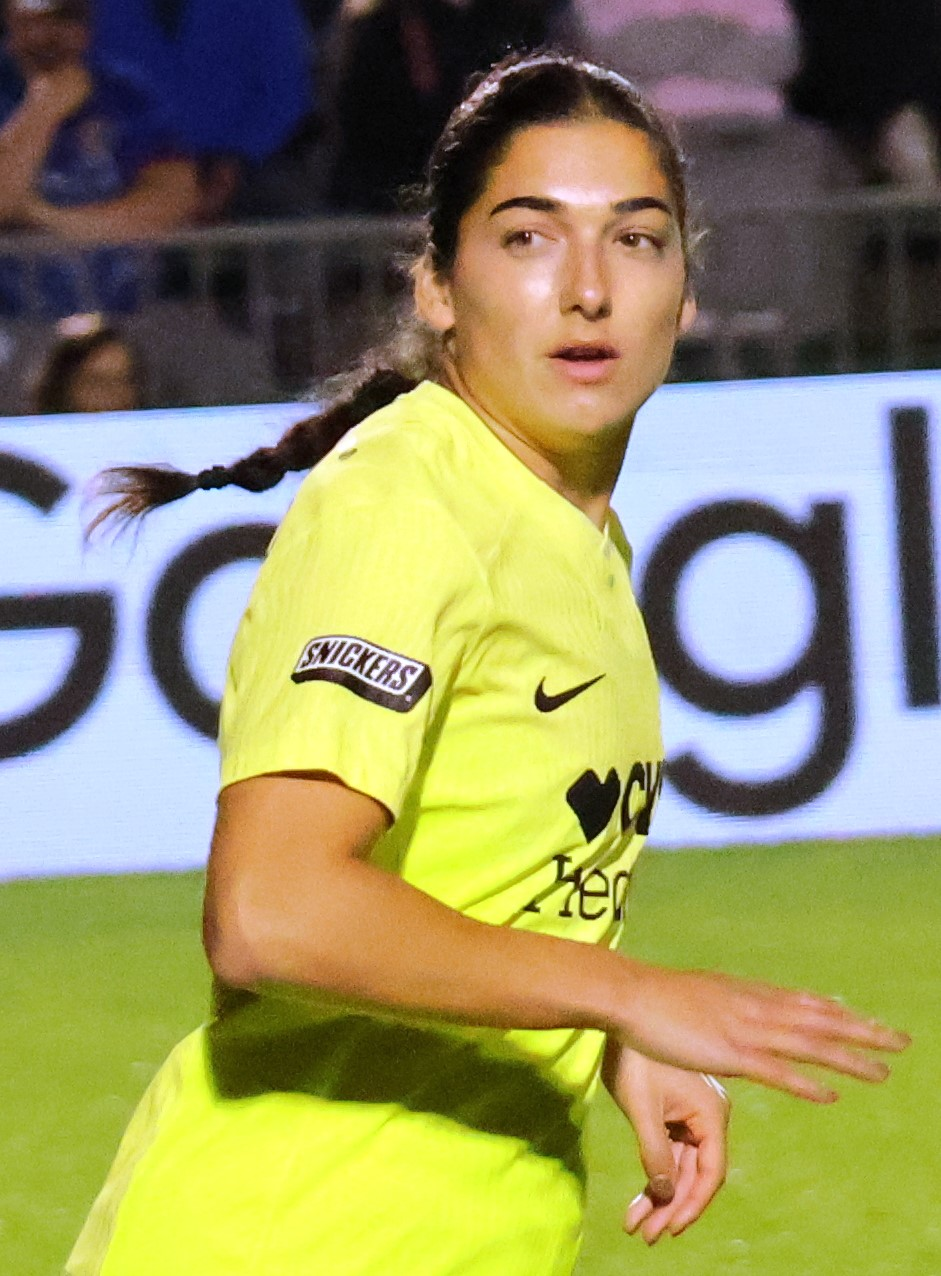
- Silano with the Washington Spirit in 2024

Personal information
- Full name: Lena Marie Silano
- Date of birth: February 28, 2000 (age 26)
- Height: 5 ft 7 in (1.70 m)
- Position: Forward

Team information
- Current team: AFC Toronto
- Number: 28

Youth career
- Real So Cal

College career
Years	Team	Apps	(Gls)
2018–2022	Long Beach State Beach	62	(27)

Senior career*
Years	Team	Apps	(Gls)
2023–2024	Washington Spirit	27	(2)
2025	UD Tenerife	9	(0)
2025–2026	Spokane Zephyr	28	(7)
2026–	AFC Toronto	13	(3)
- * Club domestic league appearances and goals as of October 28, 2026

Lena Marie Silano (born February 28, 2000) is an American professional soccer player who plays as a forward for Northern Super League club AFC Toronto. She played college soccer for the Long Beach State Beach and was drafted by the Washington Spirit in the third round of the 2023 NWSL Draft.

== College career ==
Silano appeared in six matches during her first season at Long Beach State in 2018 and played in all 17 matches in 2019. Her 2020 season was canceled due to the COVID-19 pandemic and she was granted an extra year of eligibility. She played a total 62 matches for Long Beach State and scored 27 goals and made 10 assists.

She was a two-time All-West Region selection, two-time All-Big West Conference selection, and the 2022 Big West Offensive Player of the Year.

In 2022, Silano's late-game bicycle kick to tie a match went viral with outlets like ESPN, Sports Illustrated, and CNN sharing the clip on social media.

== Club career ==
=== Washington Spirit ===
Silano was selected with the 34th pick by the Washington Spirit in the 2023 NWSL Draft and was just the second Long Beach State women's soccer alumni to appear in an NWSL game in the program's history. In her rookie season, Silano started in three regular season matches and six starts in the 2023 Challenge Cup, logging three assists and one goal.

On December 29, 2024, Silano announced her departure from the Spirit.

=== UD Tenerife ===
On January 13, 2025, Silano signed a contract with Spanish club UD Tenerife in Liga F. She made her club debut on March 15, 2025, entering the match against FC Barcelona in the 86th minute.

=== Spokane Zephyr ===
On July 22, 2025, Spokane Zephyr announced the signing of Silano before their second season in the USL Super League. She made her club debut in the season-opening 2–1 loss to the Dallas Trinity. The following week, making a return to Audi Field, she scored her first goals for the Zephyr with two headers in the span of three minutes in a 2–2 draw with DC Power FC. In her only season in Spokane, she played in all 28 games and led the team with 7 goals. In the club's final game, she came off the bench to score the last goal in a 4–0 win over Brooklyn FC as the Zephyr missed the playoffs by one point on the final day of the season. The club folded following the season.

=== AFC Toronto ===
In July 2026, Silano signed for Northern Super League club AFC Toronto ahead of the second half of the NSL season.
