= Tampa Bay United SC =

American soccer team

Tampa Bay United
- Full name: Tampa Bay United Rowdies Soccer Club
- Stadium: TBU North Campus at Ed Radice Complex
- Owner: Lester Bullock
- Chairman: Daryl Bullock
- 2023: 4th, Southeast Division; Playoffs: DNQ
- Website: tbusc.com
Home colors	Away colors

Tampa Bay United Soccer Club is a soccer club from Tampa, Florida whose men's team previously played in the Southeast Division in USL League Two as well as the women's team in the USL W League.

== History ==
The club was founded as a youth soccer club in Tampa, Florida, where they are the largest youth team in the city.

In 2017, they formed a partnership with professional club Tampa Bay Rowdies, who play in the second-tier USL Championship. As part of the affiliation, TBU rebranded as the Tampa Bay United Rowdies, adopting the Rowdies' green and gold hooped jerseys and wearing the Rowdies logo on their jerseys. As part of the partnership, they became the Rowdies official youth affiliate program.

In 2020, it was announced that they were joining the MLS Next youth development program for academy teams in the United States and Canada. In 2021, it was announced that the club was rejoining the Women's Premier Soccer League where they originally had a team known as the Tampa Bay Hellenic, which rebranded to the Tampa Bay United name in 2017, before departing the league in 2018.

In 2021, they joined USL League Two, the fourth tier of the U.S. soccer pyramid, replacing the Tampa Bay Rowdies U23 who had initially been set to rejoin the league in 2020, prior to that season's cancelation.

== Facilities ==
As of 2025, Tampa Bay United operates three main campuses:

- **TBU North Campus** – Ed Radice Sports Complex, Tampa, Florida
- **TBU South Campus** – Monroe Middle School, South Tampa, Florida
- **TBU Wesley Chapel Campus** – Wesley Chapel District Park, Wesley Chapel, Florida

=== Wesley Chapel campus ===
Tampa Bay United operates its Wesley Chapel campus at Wesley Chapel District Park (7727 Boyette Road, Wesley Chapel), a 144-acre county facility with multiple lighted soccer fields and other athletic amenities.

==== Partnership and programs ====
In 2023, the Wesley Chapel Athletic Association (WCAA) announced that its subsidiary Sporting Wesley Chapel had merged its soccer programming with Tampa Bay United; families were directed to TBU for all recreational and competitive soccer at Wesley Chapel District Park.

Since the merger, TBU has hosted competitive tryouts and clinics at the Wesley Chapel campus for youth players (U7–U19), and runs seasonal recreational leagues and camps at the site. The Tampa Area Recreational Scheduling Association (TARSA) also lists the TBU Wesley Chapel campus among the club’s locations.

==== Facilities ====
The park includes soccer fields, baseball and softball diamonds, basketball and tennis courts, a playground, a fitness trail, and picnic areas.

In August 2021, a new $4.8 million indoor recreation complex—a double gymnasium with event and activity rooms—was officially opened at the park, the first such facility in Pasco County in three decades.

==== Community events ====
In April 2025, the park held *Adaptive Sports Day*, part of All Abilities Month, which allowed individuals with physical disabilities to participate in sports such as boccia, archery, basketball, and handcycling.

In February 2025, it hosted the *Black Heritage Festival*, which featured cultural performances, vendors, and community activities celebrating Black history and heritage in Pasco County.

== Year-by-year ==
Year	Level	League	Reg. season	Playoffs	U.S. Open Cup
2021	4	USL League Two	2nd, Southeast	Conference Quarterfinals	Ineligible
2022	4	USL League Two	7th, Southeast	did not qualify	did not qualify
2023	4	USL League Two	4th, Southeast	did not qualify	did not qualify
2024	4	USL League Two	3rd, South Florida	did not qualify	did not qualify
