= Ben Willis (soccer) =

American soccer player (born 1996)

Personal information
- Full name: Benjamin Willis
- Date of birth: January 1, 1996 (age 30)
- Place of birth: Federal Way, Washington, United States
- Height: 6 ft 2 in (1.88 m)
- Position: Goalkeeper

College career
Years	Team	Apps	(Gls)
2014–2018	Gonzaga Bulldogs	56	(0)

Senior career*
Years	Team	Apps	(Gls)
2016–2017	Lane United	15	(0)
2018	Seattle Sounders FC U-23	9	(0)
2019–2020	Rio Grande Valley FC	4	(0)

Managerial career
- 2022–2023: Ballard FC (assistant)
- 2022–2024: Puget Sound Loggers (women's assistant/goalkeeping)
- 2024: Oly Town W League
- 2024–: Lexington SC Super League
- * Club domestic league appearances and goals as of October 26, 2019

Benjamin Willis (born January 1, 1996) is an American soccer player and coach who is currently an assistant coach for Lexington SC's USL Suoer League.

== Career ==
=== Youth and college ===
Willis played four years of college soccer at Gonzaga University between 2014 and 2018, including a red-shirted year in 2014, making 56 appearances.

While at college, Willis appeared for USL Premier Development League side Lane United in 2016 and 2017, and Seattle Sounders FC U-23 in 2018.

=== Professional ===
On February 8, 2019, Willis signed for USL Championship side Rio Grande Valley FC. Willis earned his first career win and shutout against Oklahoma City Energy on October 13. Willis won USL Save of the Week in Week 26 of the USL Championship Season. He finished second in voting for USL Championship Save of the Month in September. He was also a finalist for USL Championship Week 33 Save of the Week.

=== Coaching ===
After retiring from professional soccer, Willis began coaching for Bellevue College in the Northwest Athletic Conference. He began coaching for Ballard FC in the USL League Two in 2022, where he was the goalkeeping coach until 2023. During the college seasons, he is a current assistant coach and goalkeeper coach for the women's soccer team at University of Puget Sound.

In January 2024, Willis was named head coach of Oly Town FC's USL W League team.

On August 8, 2024, Willis joined the staff of Lexington SC's USL Super League side as an assistant and goalkeeping coach.
