= Ellie Walbruch =

American soccer player (born 2004)

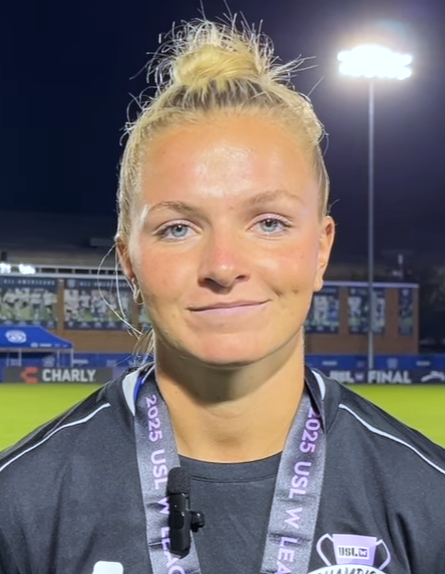
- Walbruch with Utah United in 2025

Personal information
- Full name: Ellie Louise Walbruch
- Date of birth: May 25, 2004 (age 22)
- Place of birth: Denver, Colorado, U.S.
- Height: 5 ft 10 in (1.78 m)
- Position: Forward

Team information
- Current team: BYU Cougars
- Number: 15

College career
| Years | Team | Apps | (Gls) |
| 2022 | UCLA Bruins | 13 | (1) |
| 2023– | BYU Cougars | 50 | (27) |

Senior career*
| Years | Team | Apps | (Gls) |
| 2025 | Utah United | 6 | (5) |
- * Club domestic league appearances and goals

Ellie Louise Walbruch (born May 25, 2004) is an American college soccer player who plays as a forward for the BYU Cougars. She previously played for the UCLA Bruins and was part of the team that won the 2022 national championship.

== Early life ==
Born in Denver, Colorado, Walbruch grew up in Highland, Utah. She began playing soccer as a four-year-old coached by her father. When she was ten, her family attended the 2014 FIFA World Cup in Brazil, leading her to want to pursue soccer as a career. She played for Utah Celtic before moving to the DA's La Roca. She committed to UCLA during her freshman year at American Fork High School over offers from BYU, Stanford, Texas, Notre Dame, Oregon, North Carolina, and others. She was named ECNL all-conference with both La Roca and Real Colorado. She was ranked by TopDrawerSoccer as the No. 16 prospect of the 2022 class, part of UCLA's second-ranked incoming class.

== College career ==
Walbruch enrolled early at the University of California, Los Angeles, in the spring of 2022. Under new head coach Margueritte Aozasa, she scored 1 goal in 13 appearances as a substitute during her freshman season. She was part of the UCLA Bruins team that won the program's second NCAA title, although she was unused in the NCAA tournament.

Walbruch then transferred to the BYU Cougars under Jennifer Rockwood for her sophomore season in 2023. She was BYU's third leading scorer with 11 goals and 4 assists in 26 games despite primarily playing off the bench. She was named second-team All-Big 12 and helped the team reach the NCAA tournament semifinals.

Walbruch suffered an anterior cruciate ligament injury during an exhibition game in the spring of 2024 and missed her entire junior season. She returned to action with Utah United in the USL W League in the summer of 2025. She was named the USL W final MVP award after setting up two goals against the North Carolina Courage U23 in the championship game.

Walbruch started all 24 games and led the Cougars with 16 goals as a redshirt junior in 2025, earning first-team All-Big 12 and second-team All-American honors. She scored five goals in three Big 12 tournament games to lead the eight seed Cougars to their first Big 12 tournament title and was named the tournament's offensive MVP. BYU reached the third round in the NCAA tournament.

== Personal life ==
Walbruch is the daughter of Matt and Emily Walbruch and has three siblings. Her parents met at the University of Denver, where her father played soccer and her mother played basketball.

== Honors and awards ==
UCLA Bruins

- NCAA Division I women's soccer tournament: 2022

BYU Cougars

- Big 12 Conference women's soccer tournament: 2025

Utah United

- USL W League: 2025

Individual

- Second-team All-American: 2025
- First-team All-Big 12: 2025
- Second-team All-Big 12: 2023
- Big 12 tournament Most Outstanding Offensive Player: 2025
- USL W League final MVP: 2025
