= Abi Hugh =

American soccer player (born 2002)

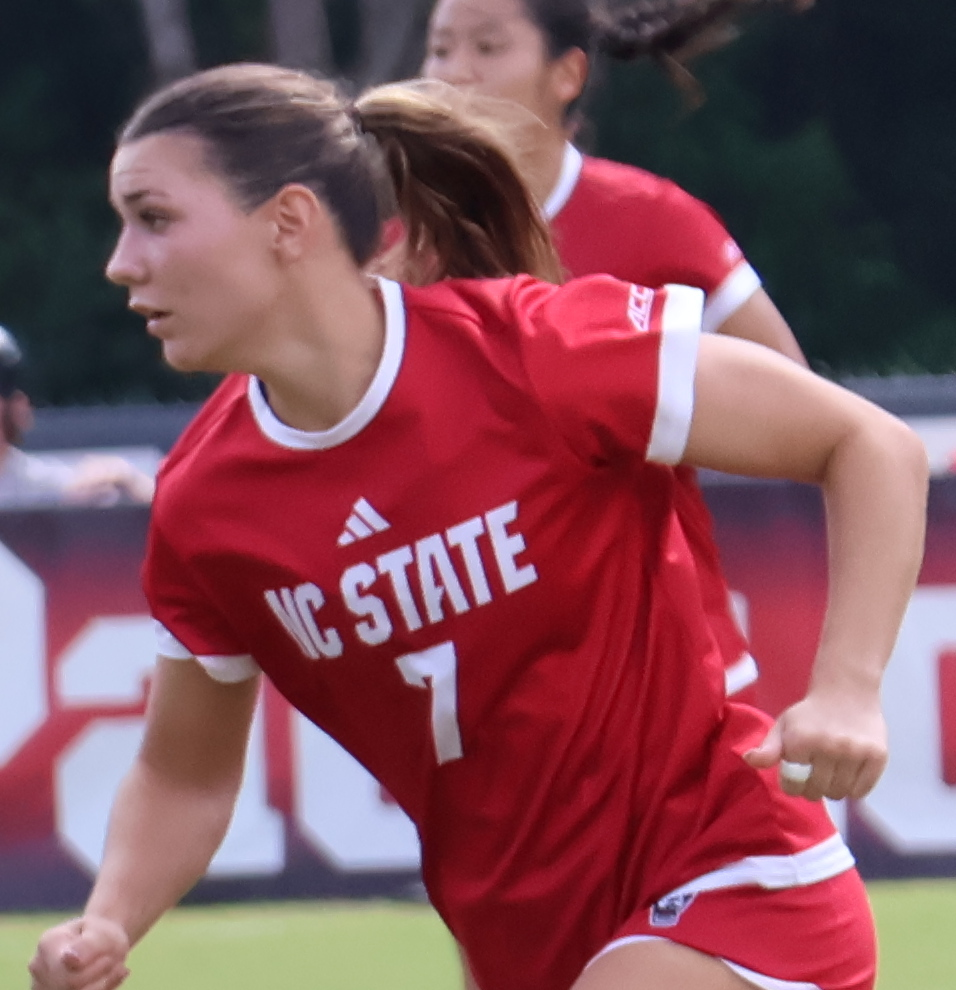
- Hugh with NC State in 2024

Personal information
- Full name: Abigail Lindsay Hugh
- Date of birth: August 17, 2002 (age 24)
- Height: 5 ft 4 in (1.63 m)
- Positions: Defender; winger

Team information
- Current team: Fort Lauderdale United
- Number: 16

Youth career
- West Virginia FC
- 2016–2019: St. Joseph Central Irish

College career
Years	Team	Apps	(Gls)
2020–2023	Marshall Thundering Herd	62	(10)
2024	NC State Wolfpack	17	(1)

Senior career*
Years	Team	Apps	(Gls)
2022	Florida Elite	8	(3)
2023	Kalamazoo FC	11	(3)
2024	Wake FC	7	(1)
2025	Pittsburgh Riveters	10	(0)
2025	Apollon	0	(0)
2026–	Fort Lauderdale United	13	(1)
- * Club domestic league appearances and goals as of 03:35, May 18, 2026 (UTC)

Abigail Lindsay Hugh (born August 17, 2002) is an American professional soccer player who plays as a defender or winger for USL Super League club Fort Lauderdale United. She played college soccer for the Marshall Thundering Herd and the NC State Wolfpack.

== Early life ==
Hugh grew up in Huntington, West Virginia, the daughter of Tammy and Chris Hugh, and has an older brother. She attended St. Joseph Central Catholic High School, where she was named all-state as a defender and midfielder in her junior and senior years. She played club soccer for West Virginia FC. She committed to play college soccer for her hometown Marshall University before her senior year.

== College career ==
Hugh played four seasons for the Marshall Thundering Herd, scoring 10 goals and tallying 9 assists in 62 games. In 2020, she was named the Conference USA Freshman of the Year after leading the league with 8 goals. In 2024, she transferred to the NC State Wolfpack to use her fifth year of eligibility granted due to the COVID-19 pandemic, scoring 1 goal in 17 games with 5 starts. During college, she also played in the summer for USL W League clubs Florida Elite, Kalamazoo FC, and Wake FC.

== Club career ==
After college, Hugh spent the summer with USL W League expansion club Pittsburgh Riveters, displaying her versatility at left back, center back, defensive midfielder, and even attacking midfielder. She led the Riveters to the division title and was named the divisional player of the year. In July 2025, she signed her first professional contract with Cypriot First Division champions Apollon on a three-month deal that would extend if the club progressed in the qualifying rounds for the UEFA Women's Champions League. On August 27, she made her professional debut as a 60th-minute substitute in a 1–0 qualifying loss to Young Boys. Three days later, she played the entire match as Apollon were beaten 3–2 by Hibernian, eliminating them from European competition.

In January 2026, Hugh signed with USL Super League club Fort Lauderdale United for the spring part of the season. She made her Super League debut on February 7, 2026, starting and playing 65 minutes of Fort Lauderdale's 4–0 loss to the Dallas Trinity. The following match, Hugh recorded her first goal and first assist for her new club as Fort Lauderdale fought to a 3–3 draw with Brooklyn FC.

== Honors and awards ==
Individual

- Conference USA Freshman of the Year: 2020
- Second-team All-USL W League: 2025
