= 2025 USL W League season =

USL W League
- Season: 2025
- Dates: May 4 - June 29 (regular season)
- Champions: Utah United (1st Title)
- Regular Season title: Sporting Club Jacksonville (1st Title)
- Matches: 491
- Goals: 1,893 (3.86 per match)
- Best player: (United States) Seven Castain Utah United
- Top goalscorer: (United States) Seven Castain Utah United (17 Goals)
- Best goalkeeper: (United States) Olivia Geller Sporting Club Jacksonville (0.185 Goals Against Average)
- Biggest home win: UTU 18–0 CIS (6/19)
- Biggest away win: DAY 0–15 KHF (5/24)
- Highest scoring: UTU 18–0 CIS (6/19)
- Longest winning run: 10 games Sporting Club Jacksonville (May 14 – June 24) Entire Season; Asheville City SC (May 24 – June 28)
- Longest unbeaten run: Minnesota Aurora FC (May 22 – Present); Stockton Cargo SC (May 3 – Present); Asheville City SC (May 10 – Present); NC Courage U23 (May 20 – June 29) 12 games Entire Season
- Longest winless run: Academica SC (12 games) (May 11 – Present) Entire Season
- Longest losing run: Academica SC (May 11 – Present) (12 games) Entire Season
- All statistics correct as of June 30, 2025.

The 2025 USL W League season was the 4th season for the league. The regular season began on May 4 and ended on June 29. A total 93 teams participated, playing in 4 conferences with 15 divisions total.

Sporting Club Jacksonville did the best in the regular season, winning all 10 of their games. Utah United were league (playoff) champions, triumphing 4-0 over North Carolina Courage U23 in the final.

== Team changes ==
=== New teams ===
- AMSG FC
- Annapolis Blues FC
- Bigfoot FC
- Capo FC
- Dayton Dutch Lions FC
- Erie Sport Center
- FC Buffalo
- FC Miami City
- Flower City 1872
- Fort Lauderdale United FC
- Hudson Valley Crusaders
- Kings Hammer FC Sun City
- Lonestar San Antonio
- New Jersey Copa FC
- OC Sporting FC
- Pittsburgh Riveters SC
- Salmon Bay FC
- San Juan SC
- Santa Clarita Blue Heat
- Sioux Falls City FC
- Sporting JAX
- Steel City FC
- Southern California Dutch Lions FC
- Toledo Villa FC
- Union FC Macomb
- USL Knoxville
- USL Norfolk
- Utah United
- Virginia Atlantic FC
- Virginia Beach United FC
- West Seattle Rhodies FC

=== Departing teams ===
- AC Houston Sur
- Athens United
- Bavarian United SC
- Capital FC Atletica
- Chicago City SC
- Christos FC
- Fayetteville Fury
- Flint City AFC
- Florida Elite SA
- Michiana Lions FC
- Palm City Americanas
- St. Charles FC
- Swan City SC
- United PDX
- Westchester Flames

=== Transferred divisions ===
- Charlottesville Blues FC (Chesapeake Division)
- Richmond Ivy SC (Chesapeake Division)
- Cleveland Force SC (Great Forest Division)

=== Map ===
USL W League clubs
Chesapeake Division; Metropolitan Division; Mid-Atlantic Division; South Atlantic Division; Great Forest Division; Great Lakes Division; Heartland Division; Valley Division; Lone Star Division; South Central Division; Southeast Division; Mountain Division; Northwest Division; Nor Cal Division; SoCal Division

== Standings ==
=== Eastern Conference ===
==== Chesapeake Division ====
Pos	Team	Pld	W	D	L	GF	GA	GD	Pts	PPG	Qualification
1	Annapolis Blues FC (Q)	10	9	1	0	34	5	+29	28	2.80	Advance to USL W League Playoffs
2	Virginia Beach United FC	10	6	0	4	20	12	+8	18	1.80	
3	Richmond Ivy SC	10	4	3	3	16	10	+6	15	1.50	
4	Charlottesville Blues FC	10	1	3	6	6	24	−18	6	0.60	
5	Virginia Atlantic FC	10	1	1	8	8	33	−25	4	0.40	

Updated to match(es) played on June 28, 2025. Source: USL
(Q) Qualified for the phase indicated

==== Metropolitan Division ====
Pos	Team	Pld	W	D	L	GF	GA	GD	Pts	PPG	Qualification
1	Long Island Rough Riders (Q)	10	7	0	3	22	10	+12	21	2.10	Advance to USL W League Playoffs
2	Paisley Athletic FC	10	6	1	3	28	14	+14	19	1.90	
3	Morris Elite SC	10	6	1	3	17	15	+2	19	1.90	
4	Cedar Stars	10	5	2	3	21	15	+6	17	1.70	
5	Hudson Valley Crusaders	10	5	1	4	24	25	−1	16	1.60	
6	AC Connecticut	10	3	1	6	21	22	−1	10	1.00	
7	New Jersey Copa FC	10	3	1	6	19	25	−6	10	1.00	
8	Manhattan SC	10	1	1	8	11	37	−26	4	0.40	

Updated to match(es) played on June 29, 2025. Source: USL
(Q) Qualified for the phase indicated

==== Mid Atlantic Division ====
Pos	Team	Pld	W	D	L	GF	GA	GD	Pts	PPG	Qualification
1	Eagle FC (Q)	10	7	1	2	25	12	+13	22	2.20	Advance to USL W League Playoffs
2	Northern Virginia FC	10	7	1	2	34	14	+20	22	2.20	
3	Virginia Marauders FC	10	4	2	4	14	15	−1	14	1.40	
4	Lancaster Inferno FC	10	4	1	5	20	17	+3	13	1.30	
5	Patuxent Football Athletics	10	0	1	9	4	39	−35	1	0.10	

Updated to match(es) played on June 28, 2025. Source: USL
(Q) Qualified for the phase indicated

==== South Atlantic Division ====
Pos	Team	Pld	W	D	L	GF	GA	GD	Pts	PPG	Qualification
1	North Carolina Courage U23 (Q)	12	10	2	0	31	9	+22	32	2.67	Advance to USL W League Playoffs
2	South Carolina United FC	12	7	0	5	22	12	+10	21	1.75	
3	Charlotte Eagles	12	6	3	3	21	15	+6	21	1.75	
4	Tormenta FC	11	6	1	4	25	14	+11	19	1.73	
5	Carolina Ascent FC	11	5	2	4	30	23	+7	17	1.55	
6	North Carolina Fusion	12	1	1	10	11	41	−30	4	0.33	
7	Wake FC	12	1	1	10	6	32	−26	4	0.33	

Updated to match(es) played on June 28, 2025. Source: USL
(Q) Qualified for the phase indicated

=== Central Conference ===
==== Great Forest Division ====
Pos	Team	Pld	W	D	L	GF	GA	GD	Pts	PPG	Qualification
1	Pittsburgh Riveters SC (Q)	10	6	3	1	24	9	+15	21	2.10	Advance to USL W League Playoffs
2	Cleveland Force SC	10	5	3	2	16	15	+1	18	1.80	
3	FC Buffalo	10	5	2	3	21	11	+10	17	1.70	
4	Steel City	10	3	4	3	15	15	0	13	1.30	
5	Flower City 1872	10	2	1	7	13	20	−7	7	0.70	
6	Erie Sport Center	10	1	3	6	8	27	−19	6	0.60	

Updated to match(es) played on June 29, 2025. Source: USL
(Q) Qualified for the phase indicated

==== Great Lakes Division ====
Pos	Team	Pld	W	D	L	GF	GA	GD	Pts	PPG	Qualification
1	Detroit City FC (Q)	10	7	1	2	18	6	+12	22	2.20	Advance to USL W League Playoffs
2	AFC Ann Arbor	10	6	2	2	17	12	+5	20	2.00	
3	Kalamazoo FC	10	5	1	4	21	13	+8	16	1.60	
4	Midwest United FC	10	2	4	4	11	14	−3	10	1.00	
5	Union FC Macomb	10	2	3	5	9	12	−3	9	0.90	
6	Toledo Villa FC	10	2	1	7	8	27	−19	7	0.70	

Updated to match(es) played on June 29, 2025. Source: USL
(Q) Qualified for the phase indicated

==== Heartland Division ====
Pos	Team	Pld	W	D	L	GF	GA	GD	Pts	PPG	Qualification
1	Minnesota Aurora FC (Q)	12	10	2	0	29	4	+25	32	2.67	Advance to USL W League Playoffs
2	Sioux Falls City FC	12	8	1	3	32	12	+20	25	2.08	
3	River Light FC	12	7	1	4	23	16	+7	22	1.83	
4	Rochester FC	12	3	1	8	12	19	−7	10	0.83	
5	Chicago Dutch Lions	12	2	2	8	11	33	−22	8	0.67	
6	RKC Soccer Club	12	2	1	9	9	32	−23	7	0.58	

Updated to match(es) played on June 29, 2025. Source: USL
(Q) Qualified for the phase indicated

==== Valley Division ====
Pos	Team	Pld	W	D	L	GF	GA	GD	Pts	PPG	Qualification
1	Kings Hammer FC Cincinnati (Q)	10	7	3	0	38	9	+29	24	2.40	Advance to USL W League Playoffs
2	Racing Louisville FC	10	6	2	2	31	8	+23	20	2.00	
3	Indy Eleven	10	5	0	5	22	12	+10	15	1.50	
4	Lexington SC	10	3	3	4	19	16	+3	12	1.20	
5	Dayton Dutch Lions FC	10	0	0	10	2	67	−65	0	0.00	

Updated to match(es) played on June 28, 2025. Source: USL
(Q) Qualified for the phase indicated

=== Southern Conference ===
==== Lone Star Division ====
Pos	Team	Pld	W	D	L	GF	GA	GD	Pts	PPG	Qualification
1	Lonestar SC (Q)	10	8	1	1	28	9	+19	25	2.50	Advance to USL W League Playoffs
2	AHFC Royals	10	7	0	3	26	11	+15	21	2.10	
3	Challenge SC	10	4	2	4	24	22	+2	14	1.40	
4	Lonestar San Antonio	10	3	0	7	16	24	−8	9	0.90	
5	San Antonio Athenians SC	10	1	1	8	15	43	−28	4	0.40	

Updated to match(es) played on June 28, 2025. Source: USL
(Q) Qualified for the phase indicated

==== South Central Division ====
Pos	Team	Pld	W	D	L	GF	GA	GD	Pts	PPG	Qualification
1	Asheville City SC (Q)	12	11	1	0	30	9	+21	34	2.83	Advance to USL W League Playoffs
2	Greenville Liberty SC	12	7	1	4	20	14	+6	22	1.83	
3	Southern Soccer Academy	12	5	2	5	19	19	0	17	1.42	
4	Chattanooga Red Wolves SC	11	3	3	5	17	20	−3	12	1.09	
5	Birmingham Legion WFC	12	4	1	7	14	19	−5	13	1.08	
6	Tennessee SC	11	3	1	7	14	25	−11	10	0.91	
7	One Knoxville SC	12	3	1	8	12	20	−8	10	0.83	

Updated to match(es) played on June 28, 2025. Source: USL
(Q) Qualified for the phase indicated

==== Southeast Division ====
Pos	Team	Pld	W	D	L	GF	GA	GD	Pts	PPG	Qualification
1	Sporting JAX (Q)	10	10	0	0	51	5	+46	30	3.00	Advance to USL W League Playoffs
2	TLH Reckoning (Q)	10	8	0	2	47	11	+36	24	2.40	Advance to USL W League Playoffs
3	Fort Lauderdale United	10	6	1	3	36	10	+26	19	1.90	
4	Kings Hammer FC Sun City	10	5	0	5	12	28	−16	15	1.50	
5	Brevard SC	10	3	1	6	12	24	−12	10	1.00	
6	FC Miami City	10	3	1	6	20	33	−13	10	1.00	
7	Brooke House FC	10	3	1	6	10	26	−16	10	1.00	
8	Miami AC	10	0	0	10	6	57	−51	0	0.00	

Updated to match(es) played on June 30, 2025. Source: USL
(Q) Qualified for the phase indicated

=== Western Conference ===
==== Mountain Division ====
Pos	Team	Pld	W	D	L	GF	GA	GD	Pts	PPG	Qualification
1	Utah United (C)	10	9	0	1	61	5	+56	27	2.70	Advance to USL W League Playoffs
2	Colorado Storm	10	8	0	2	35	10	+25	24	2.40	
3	Albion SC Colorado	10	4	1	5	17	17	0	13	1.30	
4	Flatirons SC	10	3	1	6	15	33	−18	10	1.00	
5	Colorado International Soccer Academy (CISA)	10	0	0	10	2	65	−63	0	0.00	

Updated to match(es) played on June 30, 2025. Source: USL
(C) Champions

==== Northwest Division ====
Pos	Team	Pld	W	D	L	GF	GA	GD	Pts	PPG	Qualification
1	FC Olympia (Q)	10	7	1	2	31	5	+26	22	2.20	Advance to USL W League Playoffs
2	West Seattle Rhodies	10	6	2	2	18	6	+12	20	2.00	
3	Salmon Bay	10	6	3	1	22	2	+20	21	2.10	
4	Lane United FC	10	2	3	5	11	21	−10	9	0.90	
5	Tacoma Galaxy	10	2	3	5	5	19	−14	9	0.90	
6	Bigfoot FC	10	1	0	9	3	37	−34	3	0.30	

Updated to match(es) played on June 29, 2025. Source: USL
(Q) Qualified for the phase indicated

==== Nor Cal Division ====
Pos	Team	Pld	W	D	L	GF	GA	GD	Pts	PPG	Qualification
1	Stockton Cargo SC (Q)	12	10	2	0	39	11	+28	32	2.67	Advance to USL W League Playoffs
2	Oakland Soul SC	12	8	2	2	41	13	+28	26	2.17	
3	San Juan SC	12	7	3	2	36	15	+21	24	2.00	
4	Pleasanton RAGE	12	6	1	5	16	16	0	19	1.58	
5	California Storm	12	5	3	4	29	15	+14	18	1.50	
6	Marin FC Siren	12	4	1	7	22	29	−7	13	1.08	
7	Olympic Club SC	12	4	0	8	18	43	−25	12	1.00	
8	San Francisco Glens	12	3	2	7	35	26	+9	11	0.92	
9	Academica SC	12	0	0	12	6	74	−68	0	0.00	

Updated to match(es) played on June 29, 2025. Source: USL
(Q) Qualified for the phase indicated

==== SoCal Division ====
Pos	Team	Pld	W	D	L	GF	GA	GD	Pts	PPG	Qualification
1	Santa Clarita Blue Heat (Q)	10	8	1	1	24	10	+14	25	2.50	Advance to USL W League Playoffs
2	Capo FC	10	8	0	2	29	7	+22	24	2.40	
3	Southern California Dutch Lions	10	3	3	4	25	27	−2	12	1.20	
4	OC Sporting FC	10	2	2	6	14	27	−13	8	0.80	
5	AMSG FC	10	0	2	8	10	31	−21	2	0.20	

Updated to match(es) played on June 28, 2025. Source: USL
(Q) Qualified for the phase indicated

== Playoffs ==
=== Bracket ===
Conference Semifinals
Annapolis Blues FC*	2
Long Island Rough Riders	0
Eastern Conference
North Carolina Courage U23	2
Eagle FC	1
Sporting JAX	0 (0)
Lonestar SC	0 (3)
Southern Conference
Asheville City SC*	3
TLH Reckoning	1
Minnesota Aurora FC	2
Pittsburgh Riveters SC*	0
Central Conference
Kings Hammer FC Cincinnati	2
Detroit City FC	1
Utah United	2
FC Olympia	1
Western Conference
Stockton Cargo SC*	2
Santa Clarita Blue Heat	1

Conference Finals
Annapolis Blues FC*	0 (3)
North Carolina Courage U23	0 (4)
Lonestar SC	1
Asheville City SC*	2
Minnesota Aurora FC	1
Kings Hammer FC Cincinnati	0
Utah United	2
Stockton Cargo SC*	0

Semifinals
North Carolina Courage U23	2
Asheville City SC	1
Minnesota Aurora FC*	0
Utah United	1

Final
North Carolina Courage U23	0
Utah United	4

(*) Host cities for Conference Semifinals and Finals; National Semis

=== Conference semifinals ===
July 3	NC Courage U23	2–1	Eagle FC	Annapolis, Maryland
5:00 PM EDT	Chism 45'; Garner 59'	Report	Tate 12'	Stadium: Navy–Marine Corps Memorial Stadium; Referee: Scarlet Agrawal

July 3	Annapolis Blues FC	2–0	Long Island Rough Riders	Annapolis, Maryland
7:30 PM EDT	Smith 23', 90+5'	Report		Stadium: Navy–Marine Corps Memorial Stadium; Attendance: 3,449; Referee: Abby Hood

July 4	Kings Hammer FC Cincinnati	2–1	Detroit City FC	Pittsburgh, Pennsylvania
10:30 AM EDT	Erbach 7', 17'	Report	Britain 80'	Stadium: Highmark Stadium; Referee: Trevor Hadick

July 4	Pittsburgh Riveters SC	0–2	Minnesota Aurora FC	Pittsburgh, Pennsylvania
1:00 PM EDT	Proviano (yellow card) 58'; Bryan (yellow card) 63'; Proviano (yellow card) 73'	Report	Wimes 43'; Tavana 73'	Stadium: Highmark Stadium; Attendance: 4,179; Referee: Zachary Chipperfield

July 4	Sporting JAX	0–0 (a.e.t.) (0–3 p)	Lonestar SC	Asheville, North Carolina
3:30 PM EDT	Darey (yellow card) 21'; Nelson (yellow card) 100'	Report	Bell (yellow card) 40'; Alormenu (yellow card) 90'	Stadium: Greenwood Field; Referee: Todd Adkison

July 4	Utah United	2–1	FC Olympia	Stockton, California
7:00 PM EDT	Castain 6', 86'; Evans-Tostado (yellow card) 50'	Report	Morrissey (yellow card) 36'; Lackey 55'	Stadium: Saint Mary's High School; Referee: Mohamed Abou-Alfotouh

July 4	Asheville City SC	3–1	TLH Reckoning	Asheville, North Carolina
7:30 PM EDT	Thrysøe 34'; Sheehan 37'; Bertrand 39' (pen.); Weeks (yellow card) 73'; Rodriguez (yellow card) 86'	Report	Hill 65'; Cotto (yellow card) 80'; Deguzman (yellow card) 84'; Sadberry (yellow card) 90+2'	Stadium: Greenwood Field; Referee: Justin Hughes

July 4	Stockton Cargo SC	2–1	Santa Clarita Blue Heat	Stockton, California
10:00 PM EDT	Penuna 89'; Tristan 90+1'	Report	Campbell 69' (pen.)	Stadium: Saint Mary's High School; Referee: Bernard Abousleiman

=== Conference Finals ===
July 6	Asheville City SC	2–1 (a.e.t.)	Lonestar SC	Asheville, North Carolina
6:30 PM EDT	Sheehan 90+2' (yellow card) 90+4'; Domenech 119'	Report	Wahle 19'; Fuss (yellow card) 86'; Schoenbeck (yellow card) 90'; Alormenu (yellow card) 111'	Stadium: Greenwood Field; Referee: Amy Balbier

July 6	Minnesota Aurora FC	1–0	Kings Hammer FC Cincinnati	Pittsburgh, Pennsylvania
7:00 PM EDT	Calhoon (yellow card) 76'; Wimes 88'	Report	Gambale (yellow card) 90'	Stadium: Highmark Stadium; Referee: Samuel Ference

July 6	Annapolis Blues FC	0–0 (a.e.t.) (3–4 p)	NC Courage U23	Annapolis, Maryland
7:30 PM EDT		Report	Omwenga (yellow card) 88'	Stadium: Navy–Marine Corps Memorial Stadium; Referee: Marie Durr
	Penalties
	Lathrop (penalty missed); Corcoran (penalty scored); Smith (penalty missed); Martin (penalty scored); Vidaurre (penalty scored)		(penalty missed) Garner; (penalty scored) Montgomery; (penalty scored) Howard; (penalty scored) Brown; (penalty scored) Keeley

July 6	Stockton Cargo SC	0–2	Utah United	Stockton, California
10:00 PM EDT	Tristan (yellow card) 51'; Albert (yellow card) 56' (yellow-red card) 56'; Penuna (yellow card) 81'	Report	Chambers 21'; Woods (yellow card) 40'; Castain 45'; Werts (yellow card) 88'	Stadium: Saint Mary's High School; Referee: Jessica Peralta

=== Semifinals ===
July 12	Asheville City SC	1–2	NC Courage U23	Asheville, North Carolina
7:00 PM EDT	Contreras (yellow card) 24' (red card) 90'; Khrystiuk (red card) 24'; Sheehan 37'; Thrysøe (yellow card) 51'; Viera (red card) 90'	Report	Minestrella 69'; Ivey 82'	Stadium: Greenwood Field; Attendance: 2,500; Referee: Amy Balbier

July 12	Minnesota Aurora FC	0–1	Utah United	Eagan, Minnesota
7:00 CDT		Report	Walbruch 45'	Stadium: TCO Stadium; Attendance: 5,607; Referee: Mikayla Bohner

=== Final ===
July 19
9:00 PM EDT

Utah United	4–0	NC Courage U23
Evans-Tostado 38'; Castain 54'; Blum 56'; Hladek 60'	Report

South Field, Provo, Utah
Referee: Melinda Homa Sopka

Utah United	NC Courage U23

GK	0	(United States) Taylor Rath
LB	6	(United States) Tylie Pratt	(substituted off) 46'
CB	29	(United States) Kaitlyn Richins
CB	24	(United States) Bella Woods	(substituted off) 46'
RB	14	(United States) McKenzie Evans-Tostado
MF	18	(United States) Sierra Pennock	(substituted off) 65'
MF	26	(United States) Lucy Kesler	(substituted off) 65'
MF	7	(United States) Seven Castain	(substituted off) 77'
LW	10	(United States) Ruby Hladek
FW	16	(United States) Ellie Walbruch	(substituted off) 77'
RW	20	(United States) Lily Hall	(substituted off) 46'
Substitutes:
GK	1	(United States) Sarah Mathis
MF	8	(United States) Lilliah Blum	(substituted on) 46'
MF	12	(United States) Brooklyn Blaylock	(substituted on) 46'
FW	17	(United States) Kelly Bullock	(substituted on) 77'
MF	22	(United States) Afton Perry	(substituted on) 65'
DF	23	(United States) Tess Livingston	(substituted on) 46'
FW	25	(United States) Lexi Nelson	(substituted on) 77'
MF	28	(United States) Devi Dudley	(substituted on) 65'
Manager:
(United States) Scott Halasz

GK	1	(United States) Lauren Zitt
LB	12	(United States) Gesare Omwenga
CB	22	(United States) Carli Crews
CB	25	(United States) Taylor Chism
RB	21	(United States) Hannah Jibril	(substituted off) 57'
MF	8	(United States) Lauren Montgomery
MF	9	(United States) Lia Howard	(substituted off) 77'
MF	26	(United States) Grace Ivey	(substituted off) 57'
LW	16	(Puerto Rico) Ivy Garner
FW	17	(United States) Mia Minestrella	(substituted off) 77'
RW	20	(United States) Mackenzie Geigle
Substitutes:
DF	0	(United States) Kayleigh Herr
MF	6	(Japan) Mana Nakata	(substituted on) 57'
MF	14	(United States) Taylor Shell	(substituted on) 77'
FW	15	(United States) Leah Kuklick	(substituted on) 57'
FW	28	(United States) Rylee Keeley	(substituted on) 77'
Manager:
(United States) Willie Davis Jr.

Most Valuable Player:
(United States) Ellie Walbruch

Match rules

- 90 minutes.
- 30 minutes of extra time if necessary.
- Penalty shootout if scores still level.
- Maximum of seven substitutions.

== Awards ==
=== Individual awards ===
Award	Winner	Team	Reason	Ref.
Player of the Year	(United States) Seven Castain	Utah United	10 starts, 12 appearances, 21 goals	
Golden Boot	(United States) Seven Castain	Utah United	17 goals	
Golden Glove	(United States) Olivia Geller	Sporting Club Jacksonville	0.185 GAA	
Defender of the Year	(United States) Charley Boone	Minnesota Aurora FC	9 starts, 11 appearances, no losses	
Young (U20) Player of the Year	(United States) Addison Halpern	Paisley Athletic FC	8 goals	
Coach of the Year	(United States) Ashly Kennedy	Annapolis Blues FC	Undefeated inaugural regular season	

=== Monthly Awards ===
Month	Player of the Month				References
Month	Player	Club	Position	Reason	References
May	(Canada) Aaliyah Faddoul	Sporting Club Jacksonville	Forward	7 goals in 4 games	
June	(United States) Seven Castain	Utah United	Forward	10 goals in the month	

Team of the Month
Month	Goalkeeper	Defenders	Midfielders	Forwards	Bench	Ref.
May	(United States) Jaddah Foos (SCU)	(United States) Julianna Hill (AAA) (United States) Kaitlyn Richins (UTU) (United States) Peyton Leonard (CAP)	(United States) Mika Sayfurhman (STO) (United States) Catherine Rapp (MNA) (United States) Grace Ivey (NCC) (United States) Kennedy Clark (KHC)	(England) Ginny Lackey (OLY) (Canada) Aaliyah Faddoul (JAX) (United States) Jolie Farmer (SJS)	(United States) Hannah Crum (DET) (United States) Sabba Haghgoo (ANN) (United States) Gabrielle Koluch (CDR) (United States) Bella Vozar (PIT) (United States) Ashley Henderson (EFC) (England) Phoebe Hollin (ASH)	
June	(United States) Caroline Duffy (ANN)	(United States) Megan Edelman (SCB) (United States) Charley Boone (MNA) (United States) Maia Soulis (DET) (United States) Abby Townsend (KHC)	(United States) Samantha DeGuzman (TLH) (United States) Sarah Gorham (ASH) (United States) Vanessa Penuna (STO) (United States) Lilliah Blum (UTU)	(United States) Kelsey Smith (ANN) (United States) Seven Castain (UTU)	(England) Ginny Lackey (OLY) (United States) Abi Hugh (PIT) (United States) Finley Schoenbeck (LON) (United States) Fiona Killian (LIR) (United States) Emily Banashefski (EFC) (Canada) Aaliyah Faddoul (JAX) (United States) Payton Nutzman (GVL)	

=== All-league teams ===
First team
Goalkeeper	Defenders	Midfielders	Forwards
(United States) Caroline Duffy (ANN)	(United States) Charley Boone (MNA) (United States) Maia Soulis (DET) (United States) Kaitlyn Richins (UTA)	(United States) Emily Banashefski (EAG) (United States) Lilliah Blum (UTA) (United States) Mika Sayfurahman (STO) (United States) Grace Ivey (NCC)	(United States) Seven Castain (UTA) (Canada) Aaliyah Faddoul (JAX) (United States) Kelsey Smith (ANN)

Second team
Goalkeeper	Defenders	Midfielders	Forwards
(United States) Taylor Rath (UTA)	(United States) Peyton Leonard (CAP) (United States) Abby Townsend (KHC) (United States) Abi Hugh (PIT) (United States) Taylor Chism (NCC)	(United States) Samantha DeGuzman (TLH) (United States) Catherine Rapp (MNA) (Ghana) Helen Alormenu (LON)	(United States) Addison Halpern (PAA) (England) Ginny Lackey (OLY) (United States) Emma Sheehan (ASH)

Divisional Players of the Year
Division	Player	Team
Chesapeake	(United States) Kelsey Smith	Annapolis Blues FC
Great Forest	(United States) Abi Hugh	Pittsburgh Riveters SC
Great Lakes	(United States) Maia Soulis	Detroit City FC
Heartland	(United States) Charley Boone	Minnesota Aurora FC
Lone Star	(Ghana) Helen Alormenu	Lonestar SC
Metropolitan	(United States) Addison Halpern	Paisley Athletic FC
Mid Atlantic	(United States) Emily Banashefski	Eagle FC
Mountain	(United States) Seven Castain	Utah United
NorCal	(United States) Mika Sayfurahman	Stockton Cargo SC
Northwest	(England) Ginny Lackey	FC Olympia
SoCal	(United States) Peyton Leonard	Capo FC
Southeast	(Canada) Aaliyah Faddoul	Sporting JAX
South Atlantic	(United States) Grace Ivey	NC Courage U23
South Central	(United States) Emma Sheehan	Asheville City SC
Valley	(United States) Abby Townsend	Kings Hammer FC Cincinnati
