= Vermont Green FC =

American soccer team

Vermont Green
- Full name: Vermont Green Football Club
- Nicknames: The Boys/Girls in Green, Les Verts
- Founded: 2021; 5 years ago
- Stadium: Virtue Field
- Capacity: 2,500
- Coordinates: 44.4681°N 73.1944°W
- Coach: Chris Taylor (men); Abby Carchio (women)
- League: USL League Two (men); USL W League (women)
- 2026 2026: 1st, Northeast Division; Playoffs: Champions (men); 1st, Northeast Division; Playoffs: Finalists (women)
- Website: vermontgreenfc.com
Home colors	Away colors

Vermont Green Football Club is an American soccer club based in Burlington, Vermont. Founded in 2021, the club fields a men's team in USL League Two and a women's team in the USL W League. The club mission is centered on environmental justice with the goal of becoming a net zero soccer club. They are also a member of One Percent for the Planet, donating 1% of the club's annual revenues to approved environmental partners.

VGFC's environmental mission has drawn coverage from The New York Times, BBC Sport, The Guardian, and the Men in Blazers podcast. The Green won back-to-back USL League Two national championships in 2025 and 2026, marking two consecutive undefeated seasons. The women's team made their debut in 2026.

== History ==
Prior to the Green, the Burlington, Vermont area was home to USL League Two club, Vermont Voltage, which played from 1997 until 2014.

The club was officially announced as USL League Two's newest team on October 12, 2021. One of the club's co-founders is Matthew Wolff, a graphic designer known for his work on soccer logos and jerseys. Wolff designed Vermont Green FC's logo, which was unveiled in February 2022. He continues to design all of the club's kits and apparel.

=== First seasons ===
The club played its first match on May 16, 2022, defeating Boston City FC 4–0. Norwegian Eythor Bjorgolfsson scored their first goal on a penalty late in the first half. On May 28, 2022, Vermont Green FC won in their home opener, in front of a crowd of 1,001 people. Portuguese midfielder Rodrigo Vaza scored his first goal for the club and the first home VGFC goal in history. On July 17, 2022, the Green defeated Western Mass Pioneers 1–0 in front of a capacity crowd of 2,500 to clinch a playoff spot in their first season of play. After upsetting hosts Lionsbridge FC in the opening round, VGFC were eliminated by eventual national runner up Long Island Roughriders.

Interest in Vermont Green continued to grow in the lead-up to their second season. In the spring of 2023, it was announced they had sold out of season tickets for the upcoming season, with a total of 1,250 sold. Five of the team's seven home league matches were sellouts. On the field, the Green won ten matches and finished 3rd in USL League Two's Northeast Division. The Green were eliminated from USL League Two playoff contention after a 1–1 draw at Pathfinder FC in their penultimate match, ultimately finishing two points behind Western Mass Pioneers for the final playoff spot. In addition to their league schedule, the team also played friendlies against CS Mont-Royal Outremont of Ligue1 Quebec, Kingston Stockade of the National Premier Soccer League, and local side Juba Star FC. After the season, the Green were recognized as the 2023 USL League Two Organization of the Year, chosen from the league’s 122 clubs across the US and Canada.

On December 11, 2023, it was announced that Vermont Green qualified for the U.S. Open Cup for the first time. Vermont Green won the first round match against USL League One team Lexington SC 4-3. In round two, VGFC hosted again. Despite leading early on a goal by Israeli forward Yaniv Bazini, they were eventually defeated 2-1 by MLS Next Pro side Carolina Core FC in front of sellout crowd.

In 2024, it was announced that the club would begin an annual match against the reigning champion of the Canadian Ligue1 Québec, to be known as the Maple Cup. In May, the club announced they would form a women's team. Coached by Sam Mewis, they hosted a friendly match against Ligue1 Québec side FC Laval on June 22, 2024 as a preview to the Maple Cup, winning the match on penalty kicks after a 1-1 draw in regulation.

On July 13, 2024, Vermont Green clinched its second-ever postseason berth after coming from behind in the second half to beat Western Mass Pioneers 3-1 in an away game. They finished the regular season with a 9-2-2 record, good enough for 3rd place in the Northeast Division.

=== Championship season (2025) ===
The Green were undefeated during the 2025 season, winning both the Northeast Division and the Eastern Conference. On August 2, the Green won their first-ever USL League Two national championship, defeating Ballard FC 2–1 after a Maximillian Kissel goal in stoppage time. The Green hosted all five of their playoff matches en route to winning the trophy with sellouts at each. An estimated 5,000 people watched the final, far above the official stadium capacity of 2,700.

=== 2026 season ===
The men's team successfully defended their USL League Two Northeast Division title, finishing the regular season undefeated with 13 wins and one draw. Early in the year, the Green made their second consecutive appearance in the U.S. Open Cup, securing a 1–0 first-round victory over Portland Hearts of Pine before losing on penalties (3 - 4) to Westchester SC in the second round following a 0–0 draw. In June, Virtue Field hosted the 2026 Hank Steinbrecher Cup, an annual tournament between the nation's top amateur champions. In front of a capacity crowd of 2,500, Vermont Green defeated USASA Amateur Cup Champions West Chester United SC 4–1 to claim the trophy. The men's squad then advanced to the USL League Two playoffs, hosting the early knockout rounds in Burlington. On August 1, 2026, Vermont Green defeated the Flint Michigan Bucks, 2-1, to claim the title of undefeated back to back National USL2 Champions.

The 2026 season also marked the inaugural USL W League campaign for the Vermont Green FC women's team. Led by head coach Abby Carchio, the team were undefeated in the regular season and clinched the Northeast Division title. In the postseason, the Green captured the Eastern Conference Championship with victories over the Long Island Rough Riders and Eagle FC. Continuing their run, they hosted the National Semifinal and defeated Asheville City SC, advancing to the USL W League Final against Salmon Bay FC. VGFC fell to Salmon Bay having lost their goalie in the second half to a dislocated shoulder, tied at 1-1 after 120 minutes, eventually losing 5-4 in the 6th round of PKs to end their inaugural season.

== Club culture ==
Vermont Green FC’s club culture is defined by a strong emphasis on social engagement, environmental sustainability, and progressive values. The organization promotes an identity that extends beyond sport, positioning itself as a community-focused institution that seeks to address wider social and ecological issues. The club has five formal goals it seeks to achieve:

1. Achieve net-zero emissions.
2. Fight systemic racism.
3. Donate 1% of annual sales to environmental non-profits.
4. Use recycled or upcycled materials in merchandise.
5. Promote education and awareness on influencing change.

Vermont Green FC integrates sustainability into its operations through carbon-conscious initiatives, eco-friendly merchandise, and campaigns highlighting the relationship between sport and climate action. This environmental focus is not presented as a marketing device but as a guiding principle shaping both club policy and supporter engagement.

The club’s supporters, including the Green Mountain Bhoys group, have cultivated a politically conscious fan culture. Matchdays feature banners and messages promoting social justice, anti-racism, and inclusivity, while the stands attract a diverse following, including many who were not previously interested in football. Support for the club is often framed as participation in a community project rather than traditional fandom, combining enthusiasm for the sport with civic and ethical commitment. Vermont Green’s model has attracted attention within US lower-league football as an example of a club seeking to redefine success in non-commercial and community-oriented terms. In the absence of promotion and relegation, growth is measured through its social reach and influence rather than league status.

Players and staff also adopt the club's values personally. Speaking in 2025, the team's co-captain Zachary Zengue spoke of how playing for Vermont Green encouraged him to live more sustainably, while defender Victor Akoum emphasised the need for athletes to engage with climate issues. Sam Mewis, the coach of the 2025 women's exhibition team, said of working at Vermont Green: "All my time through professional soccer, we were so wasteful with plastic bottles and not reusing things...To see the way [Vermont Green are] operating, and to see that it is possible to have that mission be a core part of a club, is so inspirational, and should be something that more clubs pick up on and feel inspired by".

== Stadium ==
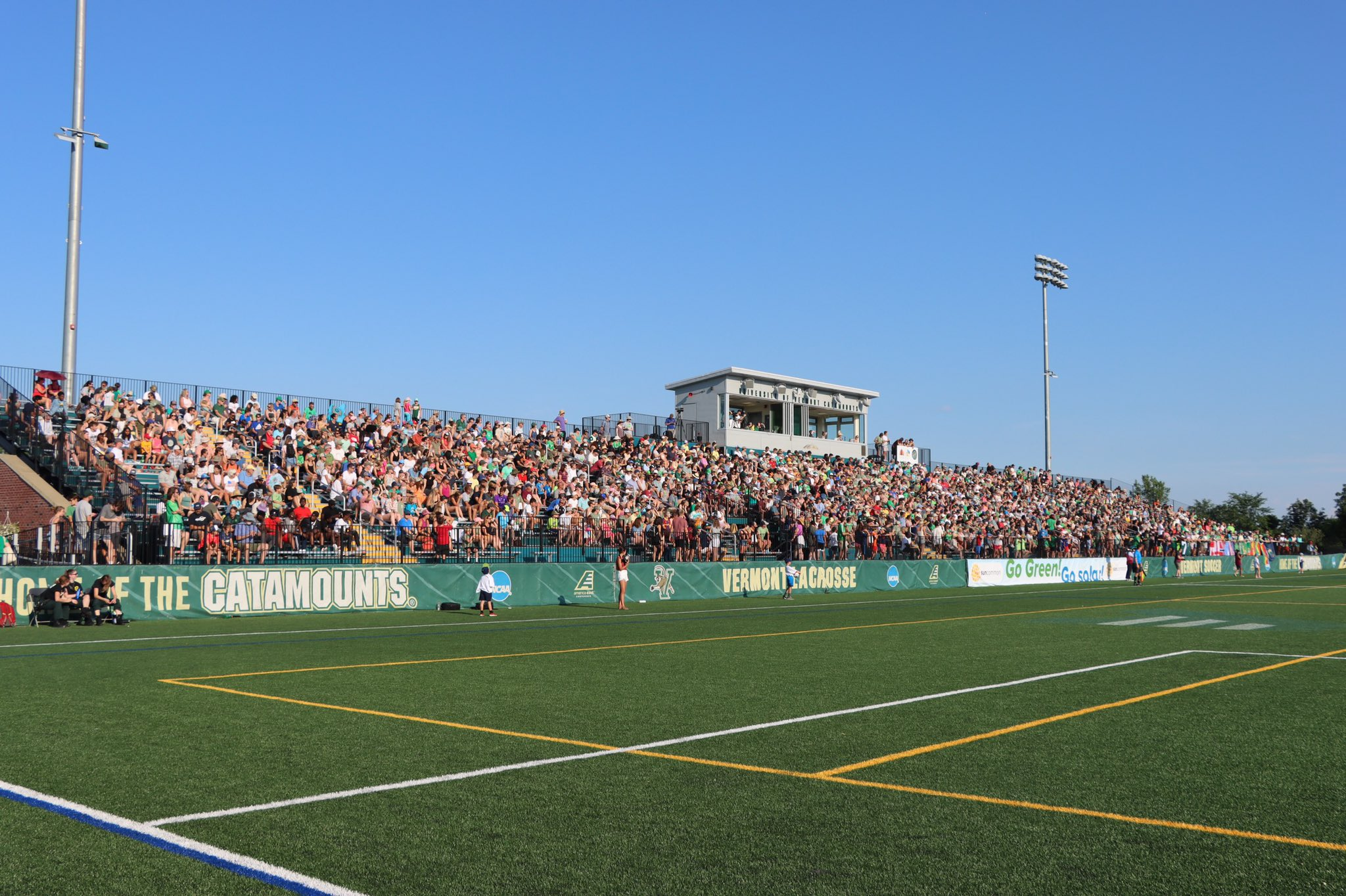
Virtue Field during a Vermont Green FC match in 2022

The club plays their home matches at Virtue Field, a 2,500-seat stadium on the campus of the University of Vermont. The stadium includes sorted recycling and portable toilets that collect waste for reuse as fertilizer. The club's founders have stated that their ultimate goal is to build their own dedicated stadium at some point in the future with more environmentally-friendly features, such as solar power and natural fibers for the pitch.

== Honors ==
=== League ===
- USL League Two Playoffs
  - Champions (2): 2025, 2026
- USL League Two Eastern Conference
  - Champions (2): 2025, 2026
- USL League Two Northeast Division
  - Champions (2): 2025, 2026
- USL W League Eastern Confernce
  - Champions (1): 2026
- USL W League Northeast Division
  - Champions (1): 2026

=== Cup ===
- Maple Cup
  - Champions (3): 2024, 2025, 2026
- Hank Steinbrecher Cup
  - Champions (1): 2026

=== Awards ===
- USL League Two Franchise of the Year: 2023, 2025
- USL W League New Franchise of the Year: 2026

== Players ==
As of July 16, 2026

USL LEAGUE 2

Note: Flags indicate national team as defined under FIFA eligibility rules; some limited exceptions apply. Players may hold more than one non-FIFA nationality.

No.	Pos.	Nation	Player
1	GK	GER	Niklas Herceg
2	DF	USA	Brandon Marshall
3	DF	CAN	Nikos Clarke-Tosczak
4	DF	USA	Egor Akulov
5	MF	NOR	Sebastian Pop
6	DF	ENG	Riley Moloney
7	MF	USA	Alexander Hall
8	MF	USA	Brendan Lambe
10	MF	ITA	Joseph Umberto Picotto
11	FW	CAN	David Ajagbe
12	DF	ENG	Tyler Caton
13	MF	USA	Aidan Godinho
14	FW	USA	Diego Rosas
16	MF	USA	Nash Barlow
18	FW	FRA	Jeremy Francou
19	DF	USA	Shakir Nixon
20	FW	CAN	Antoine Coupland
21	DF	USA	Marcos dos Santos
22	DF	NOR	Trym Linberg

No.	Pos.	Nation	Player
23	MF	NOR	Martin Bakken
24	MF	USA	Andrea Di Blasio
25	GK	USA	Ryan Carney
26	MF	USA	Andrew Millar
27	MF	USA	Ryan Zellefrow
28	GK	FRA	Jeremi Abbonel
29	MF	USA	Will Sawin
30	GK	USA	Seth Wilson
31	FW	USA	Samson Kpadeh
32	GK	ENG	Halim Bangura
33	GK	CAN	Leon Brady
34	GK	USA	Brio Levitt
35	MF	USA	Connor Miller
41	DF	USA	Nicholas McHenry
43	DF	CAN	Victor Akoum
44	DF	USA	Gabriel Fernandez
45	DF	USA	Karl Daly
77	FW	USA	Efe Aror
99	GK	ENG	Arnold Matshazi

USL W LEAGUE

Note: Flags indicate national team as defined under FIFA eligibility rules; some limited exceptions apply. Players may hold more than one non-FIFA nationality.

No.	Pos.	Nation	Player
1	GK	USA	Olivia Shippee
2	DF	CAN	Emma Warren
3	DF	USA	Chloe Gorman
4	FW	USA	Emily Mara
5	MF	USA	Maya Evans
6	DF	AUS	Meg Roden
7	DF	USA	Brooke Birtwistle
8	FW	USA	Sophie Reale
9	FW	ENG	Neve Renwick
10	MF	CAN	Sydney Remington
12	FW	USA	Lauren DeGroot
13	FW	CAN	Hosane Soukou
14	MF	USA	Olivia Grenda
15	DF	USA	Bridget Kennedy
16	MF	USA	Daisy Granholm
17	DF	USA	Caitlin Mara
19	DF	USA	Hannah Kroupa

No.	Pos.	Nation	Player
20	MF	USA	Tess Barrett
21	MF	USA	Georgina Clarke
22	MF	USA	Louisa Thomsen
23	MF	USA	Brenna Connell
24	MF	USA	Lily Gibbs
25	MF	USA	Isabel Smith
26	DF	USA	Violet Rademacher
27	GK	USA	Blythe Braun
28	MF	USA	Kat Thomsen
29	MF	USA	Ava Moore
30	GK	USA	Sydney Slusser
31	GK	USA	Maeve English
32	MF	CAN	Farrah Yaacoub
34	DF	USA	Olivia Lee
36	DF	USA	Elliot Forney
41	DF	USA	Emanuelly Ferreira
44	DF	USA	Abby Mills
66	FW	USA	Annie Gnidula
91	FW	CAN	Della Weir

=== Technical staff ===
- (United States) Adam Pfeifer – Sporting Director
- (England) Chris Taylor – Head Coach (Men)
- (United States) Abby Carchio – Head Coach (Women)
- (Northern Ireland) Lee Williamson – Assistant Coach (Men)
- (United States) Cait Fogel – Assistant Coach (Women)
- (United States) Jed Sass - Assistant Coach (Men)
- (United States) Rory Twomey - Assistant Coach (Women)
- (United States) Robert Emmett - Goalkeeper Coach (Men)
- (United States) Edgar Vargas - Goalkeeper Coach (women)
- (United States) Jett Barbic - Goalkeeper Coach (women)
- (United States) Matthew Wolff - Team Manager (women)
- (United States) Hannah Tremel – Athletic Trainer
- (United States) Sam Mewis – Women's exhibition team coach (2025)

=== Notable former players ===
- (Libya) Ayoub Lajhar – 2025
- (Israel) Yaniv Bazini – 2024
- (Costa Rica) Gerardo Castillo - 2024
- (United States) Reid Fisher - 2024
- (United States) Francesco Montali - 2024
- (United States) Nate Jones – 2023
- (Italy) Giorgio Probo – 2023
- (United States) Gevork Diarbian – 2023
- (Nigeria) Diba Nwegbo – 2022
- (Norway) Eythor Bjørgolfsson – 2022
- (United States) Owen O'Malley – 2022
- (United States) Nate Silveira – 2022
- (Ghana) Reuben Ayarna - 2022

== Year by year ==
Season	USL League Two Northeast Division										Playoffs	US Open Cup	Avg. Attendance
Season	P	W	D	L	GF	GA	GD	Pts	PPG	Pos.	Playoffs	US Open Cup	Avg. Attendance
2022	14	9	1	4	38	14	24	28	2.00	3rd	Round of 16	DNQ	1,405
2023	14	10	1	3	38	12	26	31	2.21	3rd	DNQ	DNQ	2,234
2024	13	9	2	2	31	9	22	29	2.23	3rd	Round of 16	2nd Round	2,431
2025	14	11	3	0	38	8	30	36	2.57	1st	National champions	DNQ	2,500+
2026	14	13	1	0	64	12	52	40	2.86	1st	National champions	2nd Round	2,614
Season	USL W League Northeast Division										Playoffs		Avg. Attendance
Season	P	W	D	L	GF	GA	GD	Pts	PPG	Pos.	Playoffs		Avg. Attendance
2026	10	6	4	0	29	6	23	22	2.20	1st	Runners–up	N/A	2,500
