= 2026 USL W League season =

USL W League
- Season: 2026
- Dates: May 9 - June 28 (regular season); July 3 – July 19 (playoffs)
- Champions: Salmon Bay FC (1st Title)
- Regular Season title: Minnesota Aurora FC (3rd Title)
- Matches: 477
- Goals: 1,891 (3.96 per match)
- Best player: (United States) Ameera Hassan (Salmon Bay FC)
- Top goalscorer: (United States) Kayleigh Goodrich ( Long Island Rough Riders) (17 Goals)
- Best goalkeeper: Taylor Fox (Minnesota Aurora FC)
- Biggest home win: Long Island Rough Riders 15–0 Paisley Athletic FC June 28
- Biggest away win: Patuxent Football Athletics 1–14 Loudoun United FC June 21
- Highest scoring: Patuxent Football Athletics 1–14 Loudoun United FC June 21; Long Island Rough Riders 15–0 Paisley Athletic FC June 28
- Longest winning run: Minnesota Aurora FC (May 21 – June 28); 12 games Entire Season
- Longest unbeaten run: Minnesota Aurora FC (May 21 – June 28); 12 games
- Longest winless run: Chattanooga Red Wolves SC (May 9 – June 23); Entire Season; North Carolina Fusion (May 16 – June 24) Entire Season; Patuxent Football Athletics (May 17 – June 28) Entire Season; SoCal Reds FC (May 10 – June 28); Entire Season; AC Connecticut (May 16 – June 28); Entire Season; 10 Games
- Longest losing run: North Carolina Fusion (May 16 – June 24); Patuxent Football Athletics (May 17 – June 28); Entire Season; 10 games
- All statistics correct as of June 28, 2026.

The 2026 USL W League season is the 5th season for the league. The regular season began on May 9 and ends on June 28. A total 96 teams are participating, playing in 4 conferences with 16 divisions total.

Utah United are the defending champions, triumphing 4–0 over North Carolina Courage U23 in the final.

== Team changes ==
=== New teams ===
- Edgewater Castle FC
- Hartford Athletic
- Los Angeles SC
- Loudoun United FC
- New England Mutiny
- SoCal Reds FC
- Port City FC
- Portland Cherry Bombs FC
- Rally Madison FC
- Real Colorado
- Rockford Raptors
- Snohomish United
- Monterey Bay Sirens https://www.montereybayfc.com/news/2026/03/28/monterey-bay-football-club-present-monterey-bay-sirens-as-their-new-usl-w-club/
- Vermont Green FC
- Virginia Development Academy

=== Name Changes ===
- RKC Soccer Club to RKC Third Coast
- Southern Soccer Academy to Swarm FC

=== Transferred divisions ===
- AC Connecticut (Northeast Division)
- Hudson Valley Crusaders (Northeast Division)
- Toledo Villa FC (Valley Division)

=== Departing teams ===
- Academica SC
- Chicago Dutch Lions
- San Francisco Glens
- Greenville Liberty SC
- Kings Hammer FC Cincinnati
- Kings Hammer FC Sun City
- Lane United FC
- Lexington SC
- OC Sporting FC
- Olympic Club SC
- San Antonio Athenians SC
- Tennessee SC
- Virginia Marauders FC

=== Map ===
USL W League clubs
Chesapeake Division; Metropolitan Division; Mid-Atlantic Division; Northeast Division; South Atlantic Division; Great Forest Division; Great Lakes Division; Heartland Division; Valley Division; Lone Star Division; South Central Division; Southeast Division; Mountain Division; Northwest Division; Nor Cal Division; SoCal Division

== Standings ==
=== Eastern Conference ===
==== Chesapeake Division ====
Pos	Team	Pld	W	D	L	GF	GA	GD	Pts	PPG	Qualification
1	Virginia Development Academy (Q)	10	9	0	1	24	8	+16	27	2.70	Advance to USL W League Playoffs
2	Virginia Beach United FC	10	6	1	3	13	9	+4	19	1.90	
3	Annapolis Blues FC	10	5	1	4	19	12	+7	16	1.60	
4	Richmond Ivy SC	10	4	3	3	17	13	+4	15	1.50	
5	Virginia Atlantic FC	10	1	2	7	10	21	−11	5	0.50	
6	Charlottesville Blues FC	10	1	1	8	7	27	−20	4	0.40	

Updated to match(es) played on June 27, 2026. Source: USL
(Q) Qualified for the phase indicated

==== Metropolitan Division ====
Pos	Team	Pld	W	D	L	GF	GA	GD	Pts	PPG	Qualification
1	Long Island Rough Riders (Q)	10	9	0	1	62	14	+48	27	2.70	Advance to USL W League Playoffs
2	Morris Elite SC	10	7	1	2	38	18	+20	22	2.20	
3	Paisley Athletic FC	10	5	1	4	30	38	−8	16	1.60	
4	Cedar Stars	10	4	0	6	33	31	+2	12	1.20	
5	New Jersey Copa FC	10	3	0	7	12	35	−23	9	0.90	
6	Manhattan SC	10	1	0	9	10	49	−39	3	0.30	

Updated to match(es) played on June 28, 2026. Source: USL
(Q) Qualified for the phase indicated

==== Mid Atlantic Division ====
Pos	Team	Pld	W	D	L	GF	GA	GD	Pts	PPG	Qualification
1	Eagle FC (Q)	10	9	0	1	48	6	+42	27	2.70	Advance to USL W League Playoffs
2	Lancaster Inferno FC	10	5	2	3	24	13	+11	17	1.70	
3	Northern Virginia FC	10	5	0	5	29	18	+11	15	1.50	
4	Loudoun United FC	10	4	2	4	25	22	+3	14	1.40	
5	Patuxent Football Athletics	10	0	0	10	4	71	−67	0	0.00	

Updated to match(es) played on June 28, 2026. Source: USL
(Q) Qualified for the phase indicated

==== Northeast Division ====
Pos	Team	Pld	W	D	L	GF	GA	GD	Pts	PPG	Qualification
1	Vermont Green FC (Q)	10	6	4	0	29	6	+23	22	2.20	Advance to USL W League Playoffs
2	Hudson Valley Crusaders	10	6	2	2	24	12	+12	20	2.00	
3	Hartford Athletic	10	5	3	2	25	8	+17	18	1.80	
4	New England Mutiny	10	2	2	6	15	17	−2	8	0.80	
5	AC Connecticut	10	0	1	9	4	54	−50	1	0.10	

Updated to match(es) played on June 28, 2026. Source: USL
(Q) Qualified for the phase indicated

=== Central Conference ===
==== Great Forest Division ====
Pos	Team	Pld	W	D	L	GF	GA	GD	Pts	PPG	Qualification
1	Pittsburgh Riveters SC (Q)	10	9	1	0	32	5	+27	28	2.80	Advance to USL W League Playoffs
2	Cleveland Force SC	10	5	0	5	20	19	+1	15	1.50	
3	Flower City 1872	10	4	3	3	20	22	−2	15	1.50	
4	Steel City	10	5	0	5	12	15	−3	15	1.50	
5	FC Buffalo	10	3	1	6	21	24	−3	10	1.00	
6	Erie Sport Center	10	1	1	8	10	30	−20	4	0.40	

Updated to match(es) played on June 27, 2026. Source: USL
(Q) Qualified for the phase indicated

==== Great Lakes Division ====
Pos	Team	Pld	W	D	L	GF	GA	GD	Pts	PPG	Qualification
1	Union FC Macomb (Q)	10	7	1	2	16	8	+8	22	2.20	Advance to USL W League Playoffs
2	Midwest United FC	10	4	3	3	16	14	+2	15	1.50	
3	Detroit City FC	10	4	2	4	18	15	+3	14	1.40	
4	AFC Ann Arbor	10	4	1	5	13	20	−7	13	1.30	
5	Kalamazoo FC	10	2	1	7	10	16	−6	7	0.70	

Updated to match(es) played on June 28, 2026. Source: USL
(Q) Qualified for the phase indicated

==== Heartland Division ====
Pos	Team	Pld	W	D	L	GF	GA	GD	Pts	PPG	Qualification
1	Minnesota Aurora FC (Q)	12	12	0	0	37	1	+36	36	3.00	Advance to USL W League Playoffs
2	River Light FC	12	7	1	4	23	20	+3	22	1.83	
3	Edgewater Castle FC	12	6	3	3	16	14	+2	21	1.75	
4	Sioux Falls City FC	12	5	2	5	20	16	+4	17	1.42	
5	Rockford Raptors	12	5	1	6	18	20	−2	16	1.33	
6	Rally Madison FC	12	4	1	7	21	27	−6	13	1.08	
7	RKC Third Coast	12	2	2	8	12	21	−9	8	0.67	
8	Rochester FC	12	2	0	10	5	33	−28	6	0.50	

Updated to match(es) played on June 28, 2026. Source: USL
(Q) Qualified for the phase indicated

==== Valley Division ====
Pos	Team	Pld	W	D	L	GF	GA	GD	Pts	PPG	Qualification
1	Racing Louisville FC (Q)	9	6	2	1	18	10	+8	20	2.22	Advance to USL W League Playoffs
2	Indy Eleven	9	6	1	2	29	6	+23	19	2.11	
3	Dayton Dutch Lions FC	9	4	1	4	16	21	−5	13	1.44	
4	Toledo Villa FC	9	0	0	9	4	30	−26	0	0.00	

Updated to match(es) played on June 26, 2026. Source: USL
(Q) Qualified for the phase indicated

=== Southern Conference ===
==== Lone Star Division ====
Pos	Team	Pld	W	D	L	GF	GA	GD	Pts	PPG	Qualification
1	Lonestar SC Austin (Q)	10	8	0	2	21	8	+13	24	2.40	Advance to USL W League Playoffs
2	AHFC Royals	10	7	0	3	34	8	+26	21	2.10	
3	Challenge SC	10	6	0	4	20	21	−1	18	1.80	
4	Hill Country Linces	10	2	0	8	8	33	−25	6	0.60	
5	Lonestar San Antonio	10	2	0	8	12	25	−13	6	0.60	

Updated to match(es) played on June 28, 2026. Source: USL
(Q) Qualified for the phase indicated

==== South Atlantic Division ====
Pos	Team	Pld	W	D	L	GF	GA	GD	Pts	PPG	Qualification
1	Charlotte Eagles (Q)	10	9	0	1	21	6	+15	27	2.70	Advance to USL W League Playoffs
2	North Carolina Courage U23	10	9	0	1	33	8	+25	27	2.70	
3	Port City FC	10	6	0	4	26	15	+11	18	1.80	
4	Carolina Ascent FC	10	4	1	5	15	19	−4	13	1.30	
5	Wake FC	10	4	0	6	12	27	−15	12	1.20	
6	South Carolina United FC	10	2	1	7	14	21	−7	7	0.70	
7	North Carolina Fusion	10	0	0	10	1	26	−25	0	0.00	
8	Tormenta FC	0	0	0	0	0	0	0	0	—	

Updated to match(es) played on June 27, 2026. Source: USL
(Q) Qualified for the phase indicated

==== South Central Division ====
Pos	Team	Pld	W	D	L	GF	GA	GD	Pts	PPG	Qualification
1	Asheville City SC (Q)	10	8	1	1	24	4	+20	25	2.50	Advance to USL W League Playoffs
2	Birmingham Legion WFC	10	6	1	3	17	12	+5	19	1.90	
3	Swarm FC	10	4	3	3	10	12	−2	15	1.50	
4	One Knoxville SC	10	2	3	5	11	13	−2	9	0.90	
5	Chattanooga Red Wolves SC	10	0	2	8	3	24	−21	2	0.20	

Updated to match(es) played on June 28, 2026. Source: USL
(Q) Qualified for the phase indicated

==== Southeast Division ====
Pos	Team	Pld	W	D	L	GF	GA	GD	Pts	PPG	Qualification
1	FC Miami City (Q)	10	5	5	0	17	8	+9	20	2.00	Advance to USL W League Playoffs
2	Brevard SC	10	6	1	3	19	9	+10	19	1.90	
3	TLH Reckoning	10	5	2	3	17	12	+5	17	1.70	
4	Sporting JAX	9	4	3	2	15	6	+9	15	1.67	
5	Brooke House FC	10	4	3	3	21	12	+9	15	1.50	
6	Fort Lauderdale United	10	2	2	6	21	16	+5	8	0.80	
7	Miami AC	9	0	0	9	1	48	−47	0	0.00	

Updated to match(es) played on June 28, 2026. Source: USL
(Q) Qualified for the phase indicated

=== Western Conference ===
==== Mountain Division ====
Pos	Team	Pld	W	D	L	GF	GA	GD	Pts	PPG	Qualification
1	Colorado Storm (Q)	10	9	0	1	56	5	+51	27	2.70	Advance to USL W League Playoffs
2	Real Colorado	10	9	0	1	49	1	+48	27	2.70	
3	Utah United	10	6	0	4	46	14	+32	18	1.80	
4	Albion SC Colorado	10	1	2	7	7	43	−36	5	0.50	
5	Flatirons SC	10	1	2	7	9	54	−45	5	0.50	
6	Colorado International Soccer Academy (CISA)	10	1	2	7	6	56	−50	5	0.50	

Updated to match(es) played on June 28, 2026. Source: USL
(Q) Qualified for the phase indicated

==== Nor Cal Division ====
Pos	Team	Pld	W	D	L	GF	GA	GD	Pts	PPG	Qualification
1	Monterey Bay Sirens (Q)	10	8	1	1	24	10	+14	25	2.50	Advance to USL W League Playoffs
2	California Storm	10	7	0	3	21	11	+10	21	2.10	
3	Oakland Soul SC	10	5	2	3	19	10	+9	17	1.70	
4	San Juan SC	10	4	2	4	21	17	+4	14	1.40	
5	Stockton Cargo SC	10	3	3	4	16	16	0	12	1.20	
6	Pleasanton RAGE	10	3	0	7	10	19	−9	9	0.90	
7	Marin FC Siren	10	1	0	9	9	37	−28	3	0.30	

Updated to match(es) played on June 27, 2026. Source: USL
(Q) Qualified for the phase indicated

==== Northwest Division ====
Pos	Team	Pld	W	D	L	GF	GA	GD	Pts	PPG	Qualification
1	Salmon Bay (Q)	12	9	2	1	38	11	+27	29	2.42	Advance to USL W League Playoffs
2	Snohomish United	12	8	2	2	45	14	+31	26	2.17	
3	West Seattle Rhodies	12	9	1	2	28	14	+14	28	2.33	
4	Portland Cherry Bombs FC	12	3	4	5	11	18	−7	13	1.08	
5	FC Olympia	12	3	1	8	9	28	−19	10	0.83	
6	Bigfoot FC	12	2	2	8	12	42	−30	8	0.67	
7	Tacoma Galaxy	12	1	2	9	12	28	−16	5	0.42	

Updated to match(es) played on June 28, 2026. Source: USL
(Q) Qualified for the phase indicated

==== SoCal Division ====
Pos	Team	Pld	W	D	L	GF	GA	GD	Pts	PPG	Qualification
1	Capo FC (Q)	10	8	2	0	30	8	+22	26	2.60	Advance to USL W League Playoffs
2	Santa Clarita Blue Heat	10	7	2	1	47	5	+42	23	2.30	
3	Los Angeles SC	10	4	3	3	23	21	+2	15	1.50	
4	Southern California Dutch Lions	10	2	4	4	12	25	−13	10	1.00	
5	AMSG FC	10	1	4	5	14	34	−20	7	0.70	
6	SoCal Reds FC	10	0	1	9	12	45	−33	1	0.10	

Updated to match(es) played on June 28, 2026. Source: USL
(Q) Qualified for the phase indicated

== Playoffs ==
=== Bracket ===
Conference Semifinals
Long Island Rough Riders	0
Vermont Green FC*	3
Eastern Conference
Eagle FC	1
Virginia Development Academy	0
Charlotte Eagles	1
FC Miami City	2
Southern Conference
Asheville City SC*	3
Lonestar SC	0
Minnesota Aurora FC	2
Union FC Macomb	0
Central Conference
Pittsburgh Riveters SC*	5
Racing Louisville FC	0
Colorado Storm	0 (4)
Salmon Bay FC*	0 (5)
Western Conference
Capo FC	2
Monterey Bay Sirens	1

Conference Finals
Vermont Green FC*	2
Eagle FC	0
FC Miami City	0 (3)
Asheville City SC*	0 (4)
Minnesota Aurora FC	2
Pittsburgh Riveters SC*	1
Salmon Bay FC*	3
Capo FC	0

Semifinals
Vermont Green FC*	1
Asheville City SC	0
Minnesota Aurora FC	1 (2)
Salmon Bay FC*	1 (3)

Final
Vermont Green FC	1(4)
Salmon Bay FC *	1(5)

(*) Host cities for Conference Semifinals and Finals; National Semis

=== Conference semifinals ===
July 3	Eagle FC	1–0	Virginia Development Academy	Burlington, Vermont
3:00 PM ET	Hawley 81'	Report		Stadium: Virtue Field; Referee: Sarah Knakal

July 3	Charlotte Eagles	1–2	FC Miami City	Asheville, North Carolina
3:30 PM ET	Viana 12'; Eslinger (yellow card) 90'	Report	McPherson 21'; Ozorio 58'	Stadium: Greenwood Field; Referee: Todd Adkison

July 3	Minnesota Aurora FC	2–0	Union FC Macomb	Pittsburgh, Pennsylvania
3:30 PM ET	Leach 39'; Zbiljic 87'	Report		Stadium: F.N.B. Stadium; Referee: Madeline Davis-Troller

July 3	Capo FC	2–1	Monterey Bay Sirens	Seattle, Washington
2:00 PM PT	Carrillo 34', 54'	Report	Halladay 65'; McCabe (yellow card) 75'	Stadium: Interbay Stadium; Referee: Vinh Bui

July 3	Vermont Green FC	3–0	Long Island Rough Riders	Burlington, Vermont
6:30 PM ET	Mara 53', 80'; Thomsen (yellow card) 74' (goal) 88'	Report 1 Report 2	Goodrich (yellow card) 90'	Stadium: Virtue Field; Attendance: 1,887; Referee: Katie Pinkus

July 3	Pittsburgh Riveters SC	5–0	Racing Louisville FC	Pittsburgh, Pennsylvania
7:00 PM ET	Korney 21', 51'; Laberge 45+1'; Bryan 52'; Bane	Report	Strange (yellow card) 45'	Stadium: F.N.B. Stadium; Attendance: 2,112; Referee: Mackenzie Muir

July 3	Asheville City SC	3–0	Lonestar SC Austin	Asheville, North Carolina
7:00 PM ET	Viera 13', 39'; Conroy 43'		Alormenu (yellow card) 30'	Stadium: Greenwood Field; Referee: John Andres

July 3	Salmon Bay FC	0–0 (a.e.t.) (5–4 p)	Colorado Storm	Seattle, Washington
7:00 PM PT	Menti (yellow card) 22'; Ward (yellow card) 105'	Report		Stadium: Interbay Stadium; Referee: Aidan Atkins
	Penalties
	Kaiihue (penalty scored); Hindson (penalty scored); Seelhoff (penalty scored); Barnes (penalty missed); Menti (penalty scored); Manalili (penalty scored)		(penalty missed) R. Kotschau; (penalty scored) Seidl; (penalty scored) M. Kotschau; (penalty scored) Beckman; (penalty scored) Thielbahr; (penalty missed) Tate

=== Conference Finals ===
July 5	Vermont Green FC	2–0	Eagle FC	Burlington, Vermont
7:00 PM ET	Rademacher 44'; Barrett 45'	Report	Garcia (yellow card) 73'	Stadium: Virtue Field; Attendance: 2,500; Referee: Corey Cenate

July 5	Asheville City SC	0–0 (a.e.t.) (4–3 p)	FC Miami City	Asheville, North Carolina
7:00 PM ET	Domenech (yellow card) 35'; Hollin (yellow card) 45'; Pearson (yellow card) 83'; Viera (yellow card) 113'	Report		Stadium: Greenwood Field; Referee: Daniel Cardenas
	Penalties
	Hollin (penalty scored); Mateo (penalty scored); Malbete (penalty scored); Gorham (penalty scored)		Penalty scored Penalty missed

July 5	Pittsburgh Riveters SC	1–2	Minnesota Aurora FC	Pittsburgh, Pennsylvania
8:00 PM ET	Molloy 37'	Report	Dubé 18'; Dunaway 90+2'	Stadium: F.N.B. Stadium; Attendance: 2,054; Referee: Alex Parent

July 5	Salmon Bay FC	3–0	Capo FC	Seattle, Washington
9:30 PM ET	Shell 36'; Hussen 42', 81'	Report		Stadium: Interbay Stadium; Referee: Matthew Connolly

=== Semifinals ===
July 11	Vermont Green FC	1–0	Asheville City SC	Burlington, Vermont
7:00 PM ET	Mara (yellow card) 52' (goal) 55'	Report	Chaves (yellow card) 35'	Stadium: Virtue Field; Attendance: 2,500; Referee: Danielle Cornetta

July 11	Salmon Bay FC	1–1 (a.e.t.) (3–2 p)	Minnesota Aurora FC	Seattle, Washington
7:30 PM PT	Shell (yellow card) 31'; Kaiihue 90+1' (pen.)	Report	Dube (yellow card) 20' (yellow-red card) 104'; Morisi (yellow card) 23'; Kitagawa 29' (pen.) (red card) 120'; Fox (yellow card) 89'; Brown (yellow card) 90'; Costa (red card) 120'	Stadium: Interbay Stadium; Attendance: 1,547; Referee: Rae Gerking
	Penalties
	Kaiihue (penalty scored); Reitz (penalty missed); Milam (penalty missed); Hussen (penalty scored); Menti (penalty scored)		(penalty missed) Albert; (penalty scored) Zbiljic; (penalty scored) Behnke; (penalty missed) Gutierrez; (penalty missed) Fox

=== USL W League Final ===
July 18
8:00 PM ET

Salmon Bay FC	1–1 (a.e.t.)	Vermont Green FC
Manalili 78'; Barker (yellow card) 119'	Report	Warren (yellow card) 45+1'; Carchio (yellow card) 68'; Mara (yellow card) 90'; Thomsen 90+4'; Renwick (yellow card) 95'
Penalties
Kaiihue (penalty scored); Courtenay (penalty missed); Hussen (penalty scored); Ulkekul (penalty scored); Manalili (penalty scored); Singh (penalty scored)	5–4	(penalty scored) Renwick; (penalty missed) Barrett; (penalty scored) Smith; (penalty scored) Grenda; (penalty scored) Gorman; (penalty missed) Gnidula

Interbay Stadium, Seattle, Washington
Attendance: 2,096
Referee: Alexis Magston

Most Valuable Player:
(United States) Ui Kaaihue (Salmon Bay FC)

== Awards ==
=== Individual awards ===
Award	Winner	Team	Reason	Ref.
Player of the Year	(United States) Ameera Hassan	Salmon Bay FC	in 16 games she scored 7 goals and 1 assist across 1,317 minutes of action	
Golden Boot	(United States) Kayleigh Goodrich	Long Island Rough Riders	17 goals	
Golden Glove	(United States) Taylor Fox	Minnesota Aurora FC	0.13 GAA, 1 Goal in 669 minutes	
Coaches of the Year	(England) Scott Gibson	Pittsburgh Riveters SC	9-0-1 record	
Coaches of the Year	(United States) Abby Carchio	Vermont Green FC	USL W League Final appearance in first ever season with a 6-0-4 record	
Coaches of the Year	(United States) Kelly Findley	Charlotte Eagles	9-1-0 record dethroning the NC Courage U23	
Coaches of the Year	(United States) Malia Arrant	Salmon Bay FC	USL W League Champions with a 9-2-1 record	
Executives of the Year	(United States) David Dwaihy	Detroit City FC	NA	
Executives of the Year	(United States) Tiffany Mallick	Salmon Bay FC	NA	
Executives of the Year	(United States) Hannah Esslie	Hudson Valley Crusaders	NA	
Executives of the Year	(United States) Mathes Mennell	Asheville City SC	NA	

=== Organizational awards ===
Award	Winner	Conference	Reason	Ref.
Organizations of the Year	Pittsburgh Riveters SC	Central	9-0-1 record	
Organizations of the Year	Salmon Bay FC	Western	USL W League Champions in second season	
Organizations of the Year	Eagle FC	Eastern	9-1-0 record	
Organizations of the Year	Asheville City SC	Southern	8-1-1 record	
New Organization of the Year	Vermont Green FC	Eastern	USL W League Final appearance in first season	
