= Matthew Wolff (designer) =

American graphic designer

- Born: 1990 (age 35–36); New York, New York, U.S.
- Occupation: Graphic designer
- Years active: 2010–present

Matthew Wolff is an American graphic designer known for his work designing sports logos and jerseys, particularly for association football teams. He is also a co-founder of Vermont Green FC, a USL League Two soccer club in Burlington, Vermont.

== Biography ==
Wolff was born in 1990 in New York City but raised in Minneapolis and London. He attended St. Paul Academy and Summit School in Saint Paul, Minnesota. He then matriculated to Skidmore College, where he played as a forward on the school's NCAA Division III soccer team.

Wolff received a Bachelor of Science in management and business from Skidmore College in 2012. He then studied at Parsons School of Design, receiving his Associate of Applied Science degree in Graphic Design in 2014.

After graduating from Parsons, he began work as a graphic designer for Upper 90 Soccer, a soccer equipment retailer in New York City. From January 2014 to September 2015, he worked at New York City FC as the in-house graphic designer.

He then went on to work for Nike, Inc. as a graphic designer in their global football apparel department. At Nike, he designed the 2018 FIFA World Cup kits for the national association football teams of Nigeria and France. The Nigeria kits were quickly sold out and broke pre-order records, and they were nominated for a Beazley Design of the Year award.

In 2021, Wolff co-founded Vermont Green FC, an amateur team based in Burlington, Vermont playing in USL League Two. He also designed the team's crest and branding, which was unveiled in February 2022. The team places an emphasis on environmental activism, and Wolff says he has been working with manufacturers to make the team's jerseys out of recycled and sustainable materials.

In 2022, Wolff designed the logos and uniforms for the Minnesota Twins of Major League Baseball. Wolff grew up a fan of the team.

== Designs ==
Crests designed by Matthew Wolff

Los Angeles FC
(2016)

Louisville City FC
(2020)

Chicago Fire FC
(2021)

Below is a list of some of the teams Wolff has designed crests for:

- Boston Legacy FC
- Brookhattan FC
- Carolina Core FC
- Central Coast United FC
- Charleston Battery
- Charlottesville Blues FC
- Chicago Fire FC
- Denver Summit FC
- Green Bay Voyageurs FC
- Internacional de Bogotá
- One Knoxville SC
- Los Angeles FC
- Racing Louisville FC
- Louisville City FC
- Minneapolis City SC
- NJ/NY Gotham FC
- Union Omaha
- Oakland County FC
- Oakland Roots SC
- OKC United
- Port St. Lucie SC
- Project 51O
- Salmon Bay FC
- San Diego Wave FC
- Sporting Club Jacksonville
- St. Petersburg FC
- Staten Island Athletic SC
- FC Tulsa
- Vermont Green FC
- Victoria Highlanders FC
- Virginia Beach City FC
