= FC Olympia =

Soccer team in Olympia, Washington

- Full name: Football Club Olympia
- Nickname: Artesians
- Founded: 2014; 12 years ago
- Stadium: Well 80 Pitch, RAC
- Owner: Ryan Perkins
- Coach: USL2: Luke Sandblom; USL W: Kellyn Green
- League: Men: USL League Two; Women: USL W League
- Men: 2025: Men: 7th. of Northwest Division
- Website: fcoly.com
USL (Home) colors	USL (Away) colors

Football Club Olympia, formerly Oly Town FC, is an American soccer club from Olympia, Washington. It has a men's outdoor team in USL League Two, a men's indoor team in the Western Indoor Soccer League, a women's outdoor side in the USL W League, and a women's indoor side in the Northwest Premier League.

== History ==
The club was founded by Ryan Perkins in 2014, after the indoor team, "Tumwater Pioneers" of the PASL, folded in 2013. Oly Town Artesians moved to USL League Two in 2022. In 2023, Oly Town Artesians FC founded a women's team to compete in the USL W League. The men's team hired former Sounders player and Olympia native Jason Dunn as their head coach in January 2024.

The team was renamed to FC Olympia prior to the 2024 season. In February 2026, the men's team hired Luke Sandblom as their head coach.

== Sponsorship ==
Period	Kit manufacturer	Shirt partner
2014-2018	Adidas	Lucky Dog Casino
2019–2022	Adidas	Well 80 Brewing
2022-2025	Puma	Well 80 Brewing
2025-	Puma	Taylor Shellfish Farms

== USL 2 Staff ==
Coaching staff
Head coach	Luke Sandblom
Assistant coach	Jay Smith
Goalkeeper coach	Mark Nowack

Last updated: May 2026
Source: FC Olympia

== USL W Staff ==
Coaching staff
Head coach	Kelly Green
Assistant coach	Miceala Castain
Goalkeeper coach	Ben Willis

Last updated: May 2025
Source: FC Olympia

=== Leagues ===
- 2014–2024: Men's indoor: Western Indoor Soccer League
- 2017–2022, 2024-present: Men's outdoor: Evergreen Premier League
- 2022–present: Men's outdoor: USL League Two
- 2023–present: Women's outdoor: USL W League
- 2022–2024: Women's indoor: Northwest Premier League (Indoor)

=== USL 2 roster ===
As of June 16, 2025

Note: Flags indicate national team as defined under FIFA eligibility rules; some limited exceptions apply. Players may hold more than one non-FIFA nationality.

No.	Pos.	Nation	Player
7	MF	USA	Alex Hall
32	MF	GER	Diego Righi

=== USL W roster ===
As of June 20, 2025

Note: Flags indicate national team as defined under FIFA eligibility rules; some limited exceptions apply. Players may hold more than one non-FIFA nationality.

No.	Pos.	Nation	Player
—	GK	USA	Izzy Lee
—	GK	USA	Phobe Carver
—	GK	USA	Kassidy Kirgan
—	GK	USA	Rory Murry
—	GK	JPN	Shu Ohba
—	DF	USA	Kayla Soderstrom
—	DF	USA	Ellie Geoffroy
—	DF	USA	Shea Collins
—	DF	USA	Grace Hurren
—	DF	USA	Sydnee Johnson
—	DF	USA	Izzy Thoma
—	DF	USA	Avery West
—	DF	USA	Jaelyn Byeman
—	DF	USA	Brooklyn Lee
—	DF	USA	Lexi Lerwick
—	DF	USA	Ellen Persson
—	DF	CAN	Kylen Grant

No.	Pos.	Nation	Player
—	MF	USA	Taylor Harrison
—	MF	CAN	Tejia Murray-Powell
—	MF	USA	Sarah Rodgers
—	MF	USA	Hailey Phillips
—	MF	USA	Carley Cormack
—	MF	USA	Piper Davidson
—	MF	FRA	Manon Lebargy
—	MF	USA	Lillie French
—	MF	USA	Hayden Colson
—	MF	ENG	Mille Elwood
—	MF	USA	Bailey Ayer
—	MF	USA	Sunshine Fontes
—	MF	JPN	Honaka Homano
—	MF	USA	Eleanor Morrissey
—	MF	USA	Kenzie Rolling
—	MF	USA	Claire Jones
—	MF	JPN	Momoka Kinoshita
—	MF	CAN	Maya Hindson

No.	Pos.	Nation	Player
—	FW	FIJ	Trina Davis
—	FW	USA	Sydney Chura
—	FW	USA	Kailee Wilson
—	FW	USA	Chelsea Wagner
—	FW	USA	Ashley Roni
—	FW	ENG	Ginny Lackley
—	FW	USA	Hannah Boughton
—	FW	ENG	Megan Sofield
—	FW	USA	Jada Moorman
—	FW	USA	Noel Blaine
—	FW	USA	Cameron Bourne
—	FW	USA	Viviene Spaulding

== Year-by-year ==
Men's USL 2 Season records for FC Olympia
Year	Division	League	Regular season	Playoffs	Open Cup
2022	4	USL League Two	4th, Northwest	Did not enter	
2023	4	USL League Two	2nd, Northwest	Conference Quarterfinals	Did not qualify
2024	4	USL League Two	7th, Northwest	did not qualify	did not qualify
2025	4	USL League Two	7th, Northwest	did not qualify	did not qualify
2026	4	USL League Two	7th, Northwest	did not qualify	did not qualify

Women's USL W Season records for FC Olympia
Year	Division	League	Regular season	Playoffs
2023	4	USL W League	1st, Northwest	Conference Semifinals
2024	4	USL W League	1st, Northwest	Conference Finals
2025	4	USL W League	1st, Northwest	Conference Semifinals
2026	4	USL W League	5th, Northwest	Did not qualify

=== Stadiums ===
- Black Hills High School, Tumwater (2013-2021) Capacity- 1000~
- South Sound Stadium ( North Thurston High School), Lacey (2022-2024) Capacity- 3000
- Well 80 Pitch, Regional Athletic Complex, Lacey (2025-2025) Capacity- 100 seated, 500 standing
- SPSCC Clipper Soccer Field, Olympia (2026-) Capacity- 500 seated, 250 standing
