= 2025 Big 12 Conference women's soccer tournament =

Collegiate women's soccer tournament

- Classification: Division I
- Teams: 8
- Matches: 7
- Site: Garvey-Rosenthal Soccer Stadium; Betty Lou Mays Soccer Field; Fort Worth, Texas; Waco, Texas
- Champions: BYU (1st title)
- Winning coach: Jennifer Rockwood (1st title)
- MVP: Ellie Walbruch (BYU)
- Broadcast: ESPN+

2025 Big 12 Conference women's soccer standings
	Conf.						Overall
Team	W		L		T	PCT	W		L		T	PCT
No. 4 TCU ‍†‍‍^{y}	9	–	1	–	1	.864	18	–	3	–	3	.813
No. 19 West Virginia ‍‍‍^{y}	8	–	0	–	3	.864	14	–	3	–	4	.762
No. 12 Colorado ‍‍‍^{y}	8	–	1	–	2	.818	17	–	4	–	3	.771
Texas Tech ‍‍‍^{y}	7	–	1	–	3	.773	14	–	2	–	5	.786
No. 15 Baylor ‍‍‍^{y}	7	–	3	–	1	.682	14	–	5	–	4	.696
UCF ‍‍‍^{y}	5	–	1	–	5	.682	12	–	4	–	5	.690
No. 13т Kansas ‍‍‍^{y}	6	–	4	–	1	.591	16	–	6	–	3	.700
No. 20 BYU ‍‍‡‍^{y}	4	–	5	–	2	.455	11	–	7	–	6	.583
Arizona State ‍‍‍	3	–	5	–	3	.409	10	–	5	–	4	.632
Houston ‍‍‍	2	–	4	–	5	.409	7	–	4	–	7	.583
Cincinnati ‍‍‍	3	–	6	–	2	.364	5	–	8	–	6	.421
Kansas State ‍‍‍	2	–	5	–	4	.364	7	–	6	–	5	.528
Utah ‍‍‍	2	–	7	–	2	.273	7	–	10	–	3	.425
Arizona ‍‍‍	2	–	8	–	1	.227	7	–	11	–	1	.395
Iowa State ‍‍‍	1	–	8	–	2	.182	4	–	9	–	4	.353
Oklahoma State ‍‍‍	0	–	10	–	1	.045	4	–	13	–	2	.263
† – Conference champion ‡ – 2025 Big 12 Tournament champion y – Invited to the NCAA Tournament; As of December 9, 2025; Rankings from United Soccer Coaches Poll; Source: The Big 12 Conference

The 2025 Big 12 Conference women's soccer tournament was the postseason women's soccer tournament for the Big 12 Conference held from November 3 to November 8, 2025. The conference announced the 7-match tournament would be held at Garvey-Rosenthal Soccer Stadium in Fort Worth, Texas with the Championship game at Betty Lou Mays Soccer Field in Waco, Texas.

== Seeding ==
The top eight teams in regular season play qualified for the single-elimination knockout tournament.

Seed	School	Conference Record	Points
1	TCU	9–1–1	28
2	West Virginia	8–0–3	27
3	Colorado	8–1–2	26
4	Texas Tech	7–1–3	24
5	Baylor	7–3–1	22
6	UCF	5–1–5	20
7	Kansas	6–4–1	19
8	BYU	4–5–2	14

== Bracket ==
Quarterfinals; Saturday, November 2
4	Texas Tech	1 (6)
5	Baylor (pen.)	1 (7)
1	TCU	2 (2)
8	BYU (pen.)	2 (4)
2	West Virginia	0
7	Kansas	4
3	Colorado	3
6	UCF	2

Semifinals; Wednesday, November 5
5	Baylor	0
8	BYU	4
7	Kansas	2
3	Colorado	1

Championship; Saturday, November 8
8	BYU	1
7	Kansas	0

== Schedule ==
=== Quarterfinals ===
November 3, 2025	No. 4 Texas Tech	1–1 (a.e.t.) (6–7 p)	No. 5 Baylor	Fort Worth, TX
11:30 a.m.	Sam Courtwright 3'	Report	Hannah Augustyn 55'	Stadium: Garvey-Rosenthal Soccer Stadium; Attendance: 1,022; Referee: Richonne Clark; Assistant referees: Jay Norris; Seun Yinka-Kehinde; Fourth official: Brandon Gardner
	Penalties
	(penalty scored) Macy Blackburn; (penalty scored) Peyton Parsons; (penalty scored) Sam Courtwright; (penalty missed) Skylar Haase; (penalty missed) Kate Leibel; (penalty scored) Raleigh Greason; (penalty scored) Millie Elwood; (penalty scored) Alana Harry; (penalty missed) Sophie Neves		(penalty missed) Tyler Isgrig; (penalty scored) Olivia Hess; (penalty scored) Callie Conrad; (penalty missed) Kai Hayes; (penalty scored) Aryanna Jimison; (penalty scored) Theresa McCullough; (penalty scored) Lauren Omholt; (penalty scored) Kaitlin Swann; (penalty scored) Ashlee Zirkel

November 3, 2025	No. 1 TCU	2–2 (a.e.t.) (2–4 p)	No. 8 BYU	Fort Worth, TX
2:00 p.m.	Sydney Becerra 47'; AJ Hennessey 70'	Report	Ellie Walbruch 27', 51'	Stadium: Garvey-Rosenthal Soccer Stadium; Attendance: 1,022; Referee: Danielle Chesky; Assistant referees: Albert Franklin; Kamil Sikora; Fourth official: Benjamin Meyer
	Penalties
	(penalty scored) Seven Castain; (penalty missed) Sydney Becerra; (penalty missed) Cameron Patton; (penalty scored) Kamdyn Fuller; (penalty missed) Katana Norman		(penalty scored) MacKenzee Vance; (penalty scored) Ellie Walbruch; (penalty scored) Izzo Stratton; (penalty scored) Lucy Kesler

November 3, 2025	No. 2 West Virginia	0–4	No. 7 Kansas	Fort Worth, TX
5:30 p.m.		Report	Jocelyn Herrema 33'; Kate Langfelder 77'; Mackenzie Hammontree 84'; Lexi Watts 85'	Stadium: Garvey-Rosenthal Soccer Stadium; Attendance: 1,022; Referee: Brandon Gardner; Assistant referees: Tiffini Turpin; Jay Norris; Fourth official: Richonne Clark

November 3, 2025	No. 3 Colorado	3–2	No. 6 UCF	Fort Worth, TX
8:00 p.m.	Hope Leyba 53', 65'; Jace Holley 57'	Report	Rajanah Reed 12'; Ella Holloran 30'	Stadium: Garvey-Rosenthal Soccer Stadium; Attendance: 1,022; Referee: Benjamin Meyer; Assistant referees: Kamil Sikora; Albert Franklin; Fourth official: Danielle Chesky

=== Semifinals ===
November 5, 2025	No. 5 Baylor	0–4	No. 8 BYU	Fort Worth, TX
4:30 p.m.		Report	Ellie Walbruch 30', 67'; Mattyn Summers-Oviatt 36'; Ella Labrum 78'	Stadium: Garvey-Rosenthal Soccer Stadium; Attendance: 848; Referee: Corey Rockwall; Assistant referees: William Gather III; Mark Novosel; Fourth official: Brook Weiss

November 5, 2025	No. 7 Kansas	2–1	No. 3 Colorado	Fort Worth, TX
7:00 p.m.	Saige Wimes 55'; Lydia Viets 74'	Report	Faith Leyba 27'	Stadium: Garvey-Rosenthal Soccer Stadium; Attendance: 848; Referee: Servando Berna; Assistant referees: Joshua Ell; Logan Reeves; Fourth official: Brook Weiss

=== Final ===
November 8, 2025	No. 8 BYU	1–0	No. 7 Kansas	Waco, TX
7:00 p.m.	Ellie Walbruch 21'	Report		Stadium: Betty Lou Mays Soccer Field; Attendance: 631; Referee: Amin Hadzic; Assistant referees: Carlos Morales-Lastra; Jarred Mosher; Fourth official: Habeeb Hooshmand

== Statistics ==
=== Goalscorers ===
There were 23 goals scored in 7 matches, for an average of 3.29 goals per match (as of November 5, 2025).

5 goals

- Ellie Walbruch – BYU

2 goals

- Hope Leyba – Colorado

1 goal

- Hannah Augustyn – Baylor
- Sydney Becerra – TCU
- Sam Courtwright – Texas Tech
- Mackenzie Hammontree – Kansas
- AJ Hennessey – TCU
- Jocelyn Herrema – Kansas
- Jace Holley – Colorado
- Ella Holloran – UCF
- Ella Labrum – BYU
- Kate Langfelder – Kansas
- Faith Leyba – Colorado
- Mattyn Summers-Oviatt – BYU
- Rajanah Reed – UCF
- Lydia Viets – Kansas
- Lexi Watts – Kansas
- Saige Wimes – Kansas

== All-Tournament team ==
Position	Player	Team
GK	Chelsea Peterson	BYU
DF	Hannah Augustyn	Baylor
DF	Izzi Stratton	BYU
DF	Faith Leyba	Colorado
DF	Caroline Castans	Kansas
MF	Tyler Isgrig	Baylor
MF	Lucy Kesler	BYU
MF	Ava Priest	Colorado
F	Ellie Walbruch	BYU
F	Emerson Layne	Colorado
F	Hope Leyba	Colorado

* Offensive MVP
^ Defensive MVP
