= Izzy Lee (soccer) =

American soccer player (born 2004)

Personal information
- Full name: Isabella Mary Lee
- Date of birth: July 7, 2004 (age 22)
- Height: 6 ft 0 in (1.83 m)
- Position: Goalkeeper

Youth career
- Eclipse Select

College career
Years	Team	Apps	(Gls)
2022–2026	Illinois Fighting Illini	59	(0)

Senior career*
Years	Team	Apps	(Gls)
2025	FC Olympia	2	(0)
2026	Racing Louisville (USL W)	6	(0)
- * Club domestic league appearances and goals

Isabella Mary Lee (born July 7, 2004) is an American soccer player who plays as a goalkeeper. She played college soccer for the Illinois Fighting Illini.

== Early life ==
Lee grew up in Western Springs, Illinois, a suburb of Chicago. Both her parents graduated from the University of Illinois; her mother practiced gymnastics and her father competed in track and field for the Fighting Illini. Lee graduated from Lyons Township High School, where was a standout in both soccer and basketball. She played club soccer for Eclipse Select SC. Between her sophomore and junior years, she grew eight inches (20 cm) to reach a height of 6 feet 0 inches (1.83 m). She then had an outstanding junior soccer season, being named second-team all-state after allowing zero goals during the regular season, and just four during the playoffs as Lyons were IHSA Class 3A state runners-up. Soon after, she committed to play college soccer for the Illinois Fighting Illini.

== College career ==
Lee spent her first two seasons with the Illinois Fighting Illini as the backup to starter Julia Cili. She became the starter in her junior year in 2024, starting all 18 games, keeping 4 clean sheets, and leading the Big Ten Conference with 97 saves. TopDrawerSoccer said that Lee "[looked] like the best shot stopper in the country" at the start of 2025. She started all 21 games that year and made a program record 123 saves as she kept 10 clean sheets. She was named second-team All-Big Ten and led the Illini to their first NCAA tournament appearance since 2013. She returned for her fifth season in 2026, starting all 18 games and keeping 8 clean sheets. She again led the conference with 88 saves and was named second-team All-Big Ten. She left Illinois ranked third in program history for career shutouts, second in career saves, and first in career save percentage.

== International career ==
Lee was called into training camp with the United States under-23 team in March 2025.

== Honors and awards ==
Individual

- Second-team All-Big Ten: 2025, 2026
