= Salmon Bay FC =

- Founded: July 9, 2024
- Stadium: Interbay Stadium; Seattle, Washington, U.S.
- Capacity: 900
- Owners: Lamar Neagle; Chris Kaimmer; Tiffany Mallick; Sam Zisette; Lauren Barnes
- Head coach: Malia Arrant
- League: USL W League
- 2026: 1st, Northwest Division; Playoffs: Champions
- Website: https://salmonbayfc.com
Home colors	Away colors	Third colors

Salmon Bay FC is an American women's soccer club based in the Ballard neighborhood of Seattle, Washington. They compete in the Northwest Division of the pre-professional USL W League starting in the 2025 season. The team plays their home matches at Interbay Stadium alongside their affiliated men's team, Ballard FC of USL League Two.

== History ==
Ballard FC announced the formation of a women's team on July 9, 2024, alongside a joint organization announcement of new vice president Tiffany Mallick. The team also announced several additions to its ownership group, including then-active Seattle Reign FC players Lauren Barnes, Jess Fishlock, and Olivia Van der Jagt, as well as former Reign player Sam Hiatt. The hiring of inaugural head coach Malia Arrant was announced on November 15, 2024.

In their second season, Salmon Bay FC won the USL W national championship, winning 5–4 in penalty kicks against Vermont Green after extra time ended with a tied score of 1–1 on July 18, 2026.

== Stadium ==
Salmon Bay FC plays home matches at Interbay Stadium, a 900-seat stadium in the Interbay neighborhood south of Ballard. The stadium was built in 1997 and is also used by Ballard FC and the Seattle Pacific Falcons collegiate soccer teams. The team has announced plans to play doubleheaders with Ballard FC.

== Club identity ==
The brand, colors, and crest were announced on October 10, 2024, at a team event. Both the crest and inaugural home jersey, a pink jersey with a wave pattern and dark green accents, were designed by Matthew Wolff. The team is named for Salmon Bay, the body of water between the Ballard neighborhood and the stadium in Interbay. The crest depicts a salmon-color sunset above the Olympic Mountains behind Salmon Bay and the Salmon Bay Bridge, which carries rail traffic in and out of Ballard.

2025–26 Home	2025 Away	2026– Away	2025 Third; Sarah Robbins	2026 Third; V Meléndez

== Players and staff ==
=== Current roster ===
As of May 18, 2025

Note: Flags indicate national team as defined under FIFA eligibility rules; some limited exceptions apply. Players may hold more than one non-FIFA nationality.

No.	Pos.	Nation	Player
0	GK	USA	Mercedes Cullen
1	GK	USA	Tanner Ijams
2	MF	USA	Anna Menti
3	DF	KOR	Alex Chang
4	DF	USA	Maya Loudd
5	DF	USA	Andie Miller
6	FW	USA	Maya Courtenay
7	FW	USA	Maia Tabion
8	MF	USA	Chloe Seelhoff
9	MF	USA	Carly Whalen
10	DF	USA	Ella Hatteberg
11	MF	USA	Ui Kaaihue
12	MF	USA	Kelsey Kwon
13	FW	USA	Samiah Shell
14	MF	USA	Amelia Severn
15	FW	USA	Alex Buck
16	DF	USA	Alana Lamb

No.	Pos.	Nation	Player
17	DF	PHI	Alicia Barker
18	MF	USA	Keeley Dockter
20	FW	ENG	Freya Jupp
21	DF	USA	Sophie Hanay
23	GK	USA	Elena Milam
24	MF	USA	Aliyah Dockter
25	MF	USA	Campbell Carroll
26	MF	USA	Milly Bray
27	MF	CAN	Sadie Sider-Echenberg
28	DF	PHI	Juju Barker
29	GK	USA	Hannah Dickinson
30	DF	USA	Kaya Hanson
31	FW	USA	Ameera Hussen
32	FW	USA	Hallie Bergford
35	MF	USA	Sakura Yoshida
36	DF	USA	Freya Spiekerkoetter
41	FW	USA	Jillian McBride

=== Technical staff ===
Technical staff of Salmon Bay FC
Position	Name
Head coach	(United States) Malia Arrant
Associate head coach	(Philippines) Chalise Baysa
Assistant coach	(United States) Brooke Reece
Assistant coach	(United States) Elliot Miller
Team doctor	(United States) Chris Peterson
Team doctor	(United States) Lauren Paladino
Team doctor	(United States) Kate Fahy

== Record ==
Women's USL W Season records
Year	Division	League	Regular season	Playoffs
2025	4	USL W League	3rd, Northwest	did not qualify
2026	4	USL W League	1st, Northwest	Champions
