= Lesia Thetsane =

Mosotho footballer (born 1997)

Personal information
- Date of birth: 24 May 1997 (age 29)
- Place of birth: Lesotho
- Positions: Defender; midfielder

Team information
- Current team: Kansas City Comets
- Number: 11

College career
Years	Team	Apps	(Gls)
2018–2019	Columbia Cougars	41	(8)

Senior career*
Years	Team	Apps	(Gls)
- Kick 4 Life
2021	Kaw Valley FC	8	(0)
2021–2023	Kansas City Comets (indoor)	33	(15)
2022–	Ballard FC	5	(1)
2023	Harrisburg Heat (indoor)	9	(4)
2024–	Kansas City Comets (indoor)	1	(1)

International career
2018–	Lesotho	8	(0)
- * Club domestic league appearances and goals as of November 30, 2024

Lesia Thetsane (born 24 May 1997) is a Mosotho footballer who plays as a defender or midfielder for Ballard FC of USL League Two and for the Kansas City Comets in the Major Arena Soccer League.

== Career ==
Before the 2018 season, Thetsane joined Columbia College Cougars in the United States. Thetsane signed a professional contract with the Major Arena Soccer League's Kansas City Comets on August 31, 2021. Before the 2022 season, he signed for American side Ballard FC.

In February 2023, Thetsane joined the Harrisburg Heat from the Comets along with Mike Da Silva and Richard Schmermund in a trade for Zach Reget.

Thetsane rejoined the Comets in November 2024.
