= Pittsburgh Riveters SC =

American soccer team

- Full name: Pittsburgh Riveters Soccer Club
- Founded: April 27, 2024; 2 years ago
- Stadium: F.N.B. Stadium; Pittsburgh, Pennsylvania
- Capacity: 5,000
- Owner: Tuffy Shallenberger
- Head coach: Scott Gibson
- League: USL W League
- Website: riveterssc.com
Home colors	Away colors

Pittsburgh Riveters SC is an American pre-professional soccer team based in Pittsburgh, Pennsylvania. Founded in 2024 and beginning play in 2025, the club currently plays in the USL W League, a pre-professional women's soccer league in the American soccer pyramid. The Riveters play their home games at the 5,000-seat F.N.B. Stadium, a soccer-specific stadium located in Station Square. The Riveters are the sister club to the Pittsburgh Riverhounds SC, a member of the USL Championship, the second tier of American soccer.

== History ==
=== Founding ===
The Riveters were first announced on April 27, 2024, by the Pittsburgh Riverhounds staff, without a name. A naming contest was held with public submissions accepted until June 21, when the top four names would end up in a run-off vote. Supporters selected the name "Riveters" in the final round of voting, with more than 50% of the nearly 10,000 total votes cast in its favor; other finalists included the "Renegades" and "Strikers".

Soon after its founding, the club announced it would debut in the 2025 USL W League season. On February 11, 2025, the Riveters were announced as members of the newly-formed Great Forest Division within USLW's Central Conference.

=== Inaugural Season ===
On May 16, 2025, the Riveters played their first game, a 0-0 draw against Cleveland Force SC, in front of a sellout crowd of 6,077. The club finished their inaugural season with a record of 6 wins, 1 loss, and 3 draws, clinching the Great Forest Division title and advancing to the Central Conference Playoffs. The Riveters lost their first playoff game to the Minnesota Aurora FC, 2-0.

=== 2020's ===
The Riveters finished the 2026 season with an unbeaten 9-0-1 record, winning their second-consecutive Great Forest Division title and finishing with the second-best record in the league. After clinching the divisional crown, the Riveters were also selected to host the Central Conference Playoffs at F.N.B. Stadium for the second-straight season.

=== Seasons ===
As of July 6, 2026

Season	League											Position		Playoffs
Season	League	Division	Pld	W	L	D	GF	GA	GD	Pts	PPG	Div.	Overall	Playoffs
Pittsburgh Riveters SC
2025	USLW	Great Forest	10	6	1	3	24	9	+15	21	2.10	1st	21st	R1
2026	USLW	Great Forest	10	9	0	1	32	5	+27	28	2.80	1st	2nd	Conference Finals
Total	–	–	20	15	1	4	56	14	+42	49	2.45	-	-	-

== Squad ==
Note: Flags indicate national team as defined under FIFA eligibility rules; some limited exceptions apply. Players may hold more than one non-FIFA nationality.

No.	Pos.	Nation	Player
1	GK	USA	Bailey Herfurth
2	MF	USA	Kennedy Neighbors
3	DF	USA	Sydney Lindeman
5	DF	USA	Hadley Murrell
6	MF	USA	Sierra Dupre
7	FW	USA	Sabrina Bryan
8	MF	USA	Taylor Green
9	FW	USA	Emily Hanrahan
10	MF	IRL	Ellen Molloy
11	FW	USA	Lucia Wells
12	DF	USA	Bella Vozar
13	DF	USA	Gabriella Lamparty
14	MF	USA	Tanum Nelson
15	FW	USA	Alexis Tylenda
16	MF	USA	Shannon Studer
17	DF	USA	Natalia Disora
18	FW	USA	Robin Reilly
20	MF	USA	Annamarie Williams
21	FW	USA	Lilly Bane
22	DF	USA	Piper Coffield
23	DF	TRI	Ariana Borneo
24	MF	USA	Emme Butera

No.	Pos.	Nation	Player
25	GK	USA	Lexi Grundler
27	DF	USA	Caroline Liptak
29	MF	USA	Brooke Fabri
30	FW	USA	Lola Abraham
32	MF	USA	Mia Deramo
33	FW	USA	Coley Sidloski
34	MF	USA	Kate Friday
36	MF	USA	Fiona Mahan
37	DF	USA	Brielle Laberge
40	MF	USA	Camryn Woods
43	MF	USA	Minah Syam
45	FW	USA	Annalyse Bauer
46	DF	USA	Ella Bulava
50	DF	USA	Lily De Jesus
58	GK	USA	Caitlyn Thompson
77	MF	SLV	Makenna Dominguez
88	MF	USA	Ashley Townsend
89	MF	USA	Azalea Mihailovich
91	MF	USA	Grace Bannon
94	FW	USA	Anna Korney
96	FW	USA	Gabby Beinecke

== Colors and badge ==
Unveiled on September 18, 2024, the Riveters have a color scheme of traditional Pittsburgh sports colors, black and gold. The badge features Rosie the Riveter, initially drawn by Pittsburgh artist J. Howard Miller was working for the Westinghouse Electric Corporation's War Production Coordinating Committee to create a series of posters for the war effort during World War II. The Riveters' badge was named the 2025 W League Best New Crest, winning 52% of the votes in the final round over Sioux Falls City FC.

=== Kits Sponsors ===
Period	Kit manufacturer	Shirt sponsor
2025	Charly	Breeze Airways
2026 - present	Hummel	SportsPITTSBURGH

== Stadium ==
Pittsburgh Riveters SC will play at F.N.B. Stadium, a 5,000-seat soccer-specific stadium in Station Square. The stadium is owned and operated by the Riverhounds organization.

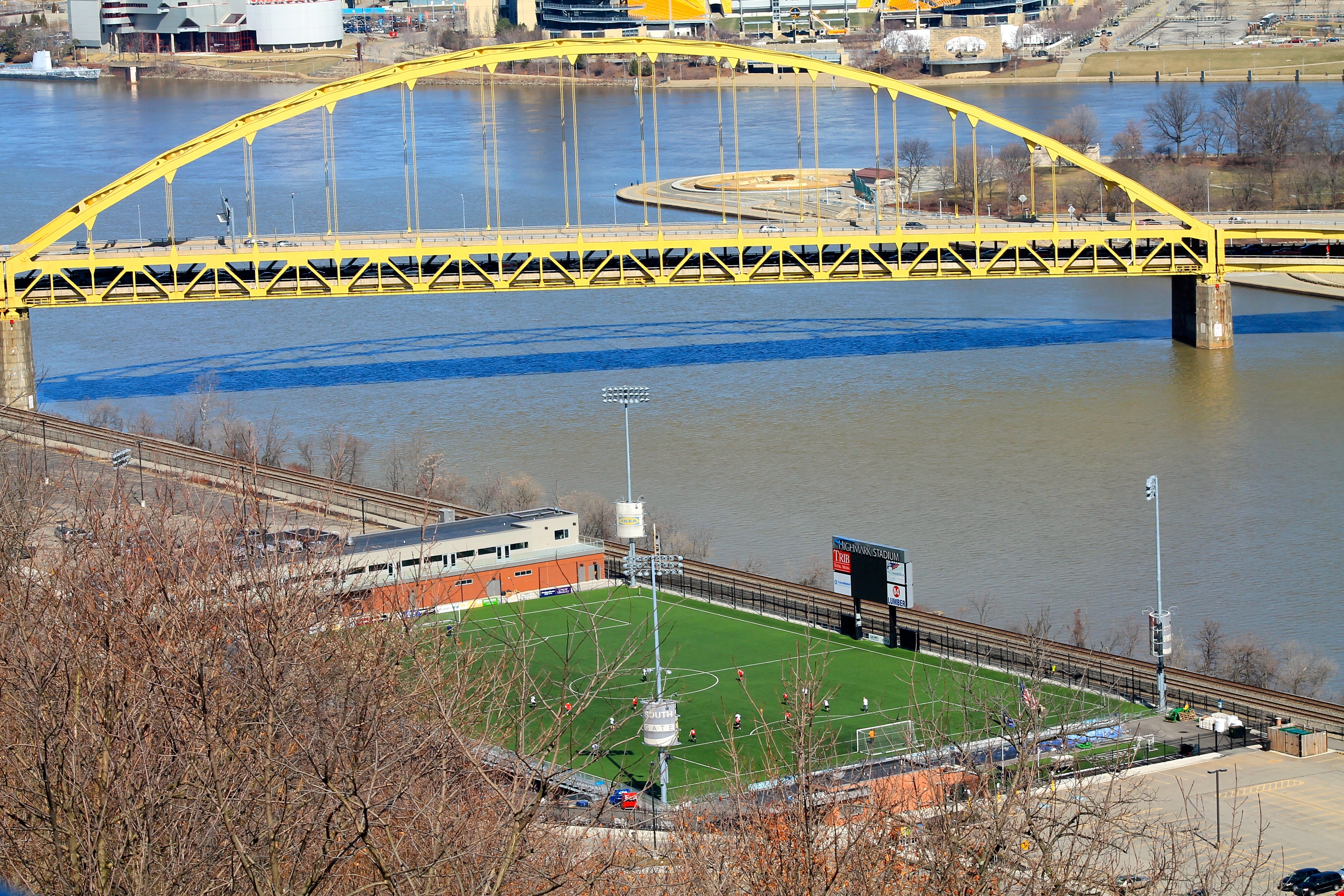
FNB Stadium as seen from Mount Washington

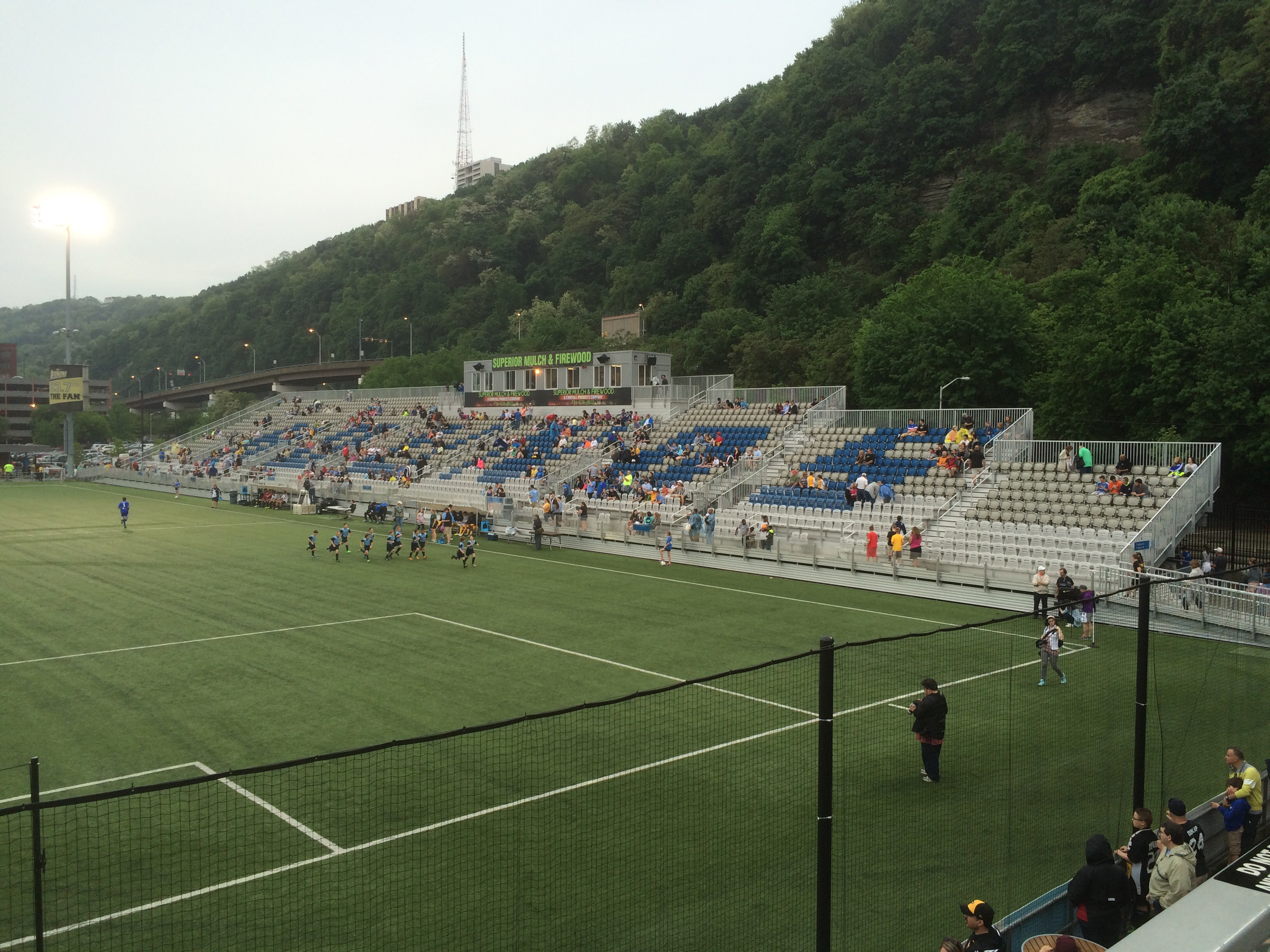
FNB Stadium main stand

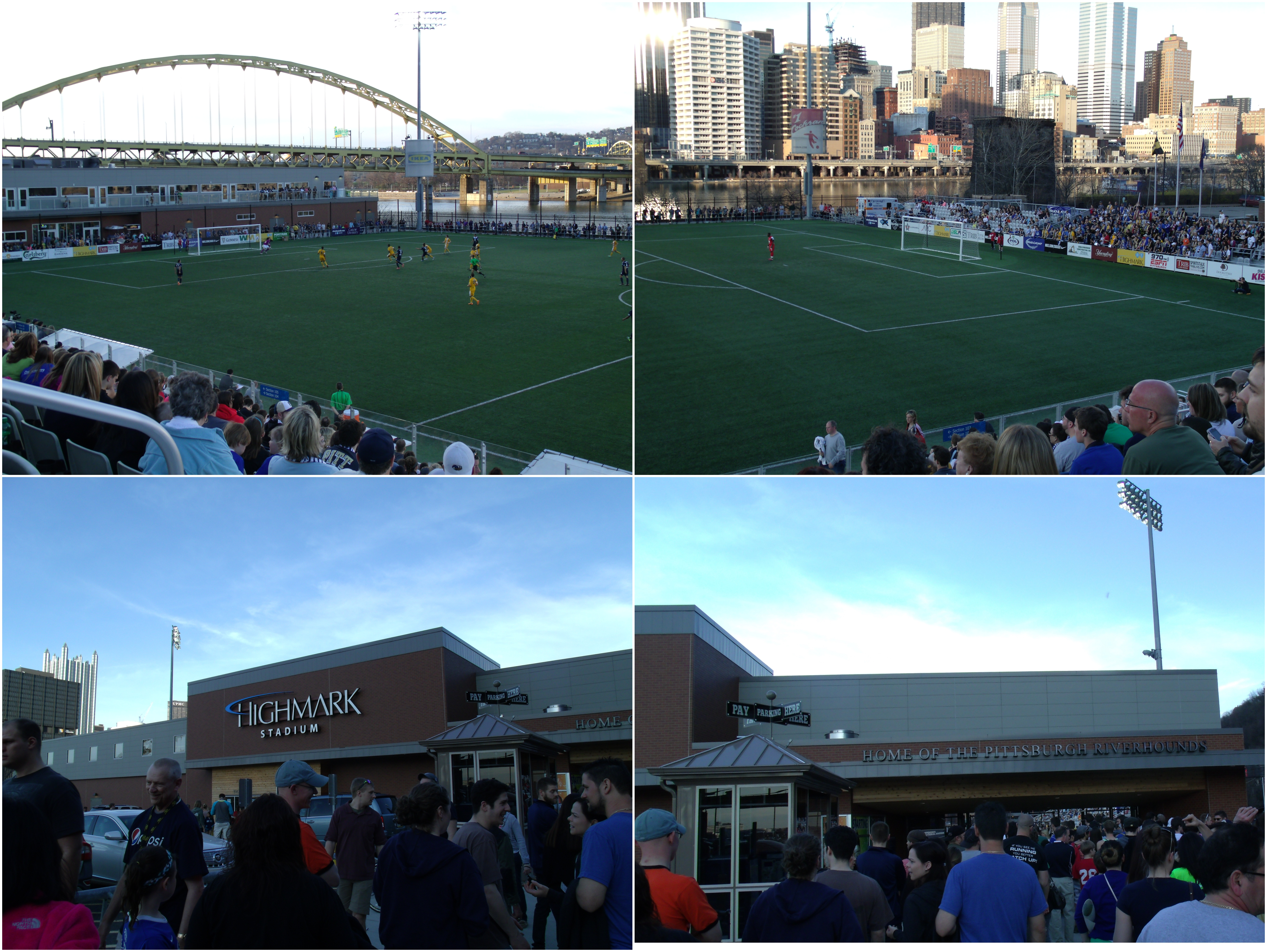
FNB Stadium

== Honors ==
=== Team ===
- USL W League
  - Great Forest Division (2): 2025, 2026

=== Players ===
Honor	Player Name	Season
Great Forest Divisional Player of the Year	Abi Hugh	2025
