= Ginny Lackey =

English footballer (born 2005)

Personal information
- Date of birth: 17 February 2005 (age 21)
- Height: 5 ft 11 in (1.80 m)
- Position: Forward

Team information
- Current team: James Madison Dukes
- Number: 27

Youth career
- 2012–2024: Manchester City

College career
Years	Team	Apps	(Gls)
2024–	James Madison Dukes	52	(38)

Senior career*
Years	Team	Apps	(Gls)
2022–2024	Manchester City	0	(0)
2023	→ AFC Fylde (loan)	11	(6)
2024	→ Burnley (loan)	7	(1)
- * Club domestic league appearances and goals

Ginny Lackey (born 17 February 2005) is an English college soccer player who plays as a forward for the James Madison Dukes.

== Early life ==
On 29 January 2022, Lackey made her first-team debut for Manchester City in their 8–0 win over Nottingham Forest in the Women's FA Cup. Soon later, she tore her anterior cruciate ligament (ACL).

== College career ==
Lackey moved to the United States to play college soccer for the James Madison Dukes of James Madison University in Harrisonburg, Virginia.

== Honors and awards ==
Individual

- Third-team All-American: 2024
- Fourth-team All-American: 2025
- Sun Belt Player of the Year: 2024, 2026
- Sun Belt Offensive Player of the Year: 2025
- Sun Belt Freshman of the Year: 2024
- First-team All-Sun Belt: 2024, 2025, 2026
