= Ryan Henry Ward =

Artist from Seattle, Washington

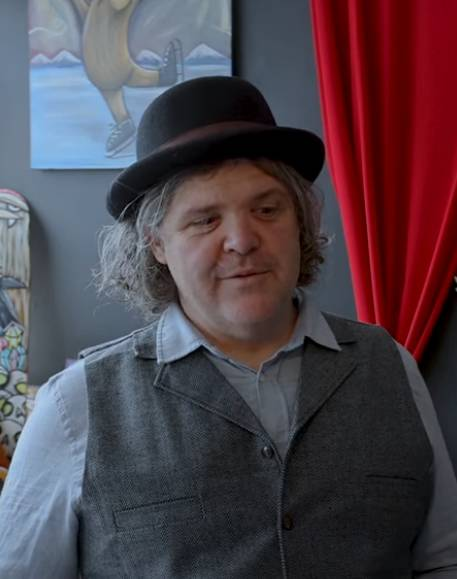
- Ward in 2022
- Born: Montana
- Occupations: Artist; Muralist
- Style: Mural art
- Website: ryanhenryward.com

Ryan Henry Ward, known as henry, is an American artist recognized as Seattle's most prolific muralist. Publicly active as an artist only since 2008, Ward has painted thousands of murals on building exteriors, school interiors, garages, and vehicles. In October 2025, "Henry" completed his "1,000 Sasquatches" campaign: Over 1,500 people signed-up to get one of his famous Sassy Sasquatches (along with some of his other characters) on their homes, garages, fences, or wherever was requested. Henry painted 1,000 Sasquatches, averaging 4.78 murals per day, for 7 months. These Sassies can now be found throughout Seattle and its surrounding cities, including his hometown of Enumclaw.

== Early life and education ==
Born on a farm in Montana to Don and Terri Anne Ward and later transplanted to the Pacific Northwest at the age of ten, Ward was raised in a variety of places in the region, though mainly Enumclaw, Washington. He attended Fairhaven College of Interdisciplinary Studies at Western Washington University in Bellingham, Washington. After his older brother Brandon died in 1999 of heart failure at the age of 25, Ward and his younger brother Andy traveled to India, Nepal, and Thailand.

== Career ==
Ward remained in Bellingham after graduation, where he worked as a social worker and incorporated art therapy into his practice. By 2005, Ward was no longer a social worker. He and his younger brother worked for two years as landscapers. In early 2007 Ward had an ATV accident in Moses Lake, Washington, permanently damaging his spine. Shortly thereafter he decided to paint full time. Although he lived in a bus during his early career as a Seattle artist, Ward now rents an apartment and maintains a studio in the Ballard neighborhood of Seattle.

Ward began creating public art with his first four murals painted during a 2007 trip to the Dominican Republic. These early works depicted scenes of family life and people playing instruments, in contrast to his later Seattle murals, which often feature animals and fantastical creatures.

In contrast to many other artists in Seattle's street art scene, Ward always executes his public pieces with the permission of the property owner.

== Critical reception ==
Ward's work has not received favorable reception from Seattle's art critics. Jonathan Walczak characterizes Ward's work as "whimsical", but sums up the critic's verdict on Ward's work as "gooey, meaningless, and annoyingly prevalent." Seattle Post-Intelligencer art critic Regina Hackett disparaged his "brain-dead cheer," stating that "a sense of whimsy is fine in toddlers, but by the age of reason, children are ready to move on to more substantial fare." Kevin McKouen, a former gallery owner who represented Ward's work for about a year before his gallery closed, describes it as "lighthearted… but it definitely also has a dark side."
