= Interbay Stadium =

Sports venue in Seattle, United States

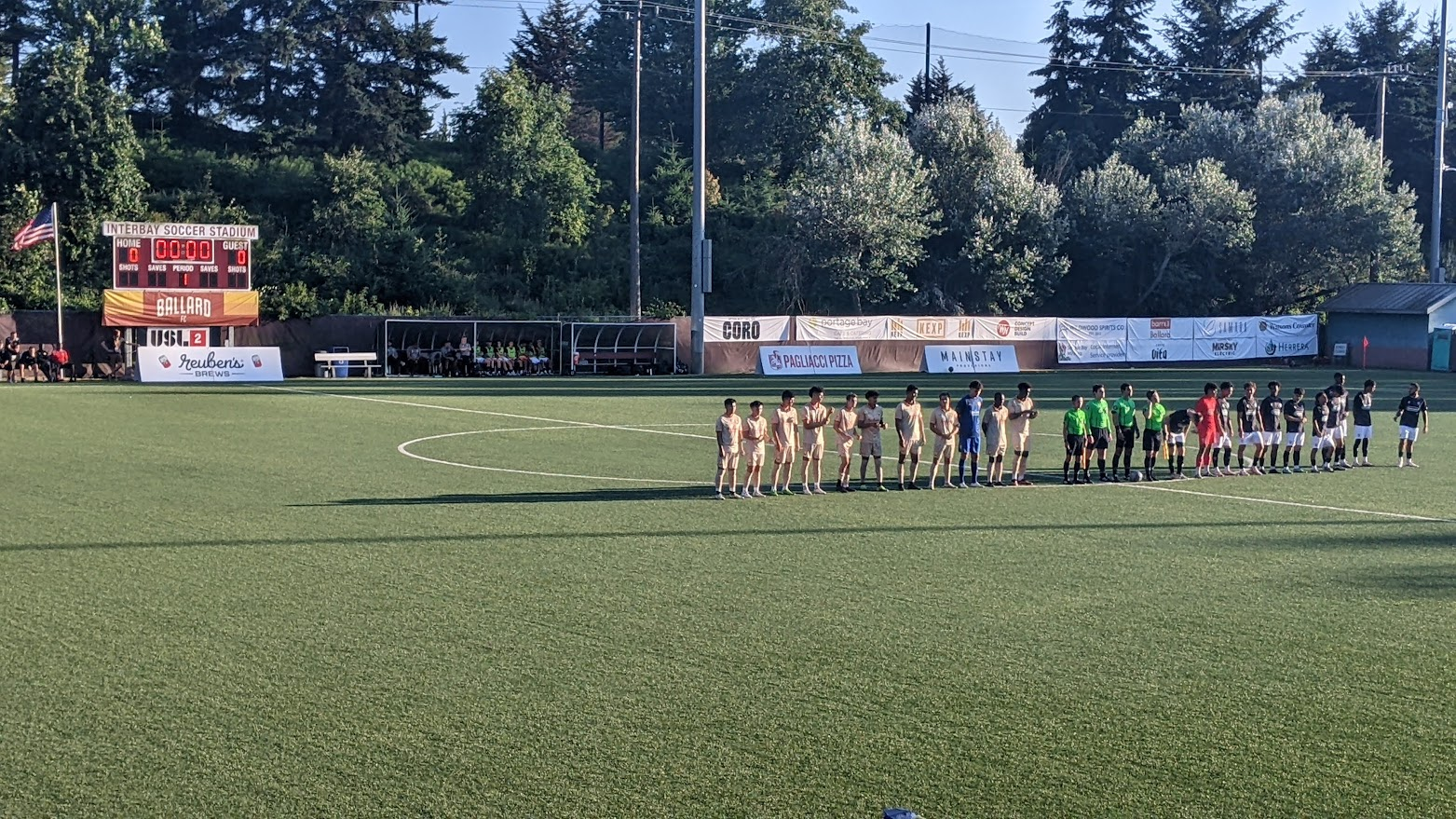
- View from stands during a 2024 Ballard FC game
- Interactive map of Interbay Stadium
- Address: 3027 17th Ave W, Seattle, WA 98119
- Location: Seattle, Washington
- Coordinates: 47.6468°N 122.3785°W
- Owner: Seattle Parks and Recreation
- Capacity: 1267 (2026–present); 900 (1997–2026)
- Surface: grass
- Record attendance: 2096 (Salmon Bay FC vs Vermont Green, July 18, 2026)
- Public transit: RapidRide D Line

Construction
- Opened: 1997
- Renovated: 2024
- Expanded: 2026

Tenants
- Seattle Pacific Falcons (1997–present); Seattle Sounders (A-League) (2002); Ballard FC (USL2) (2021–2023, 2024–present); Salmon Bay FC (USLW) (2025–present); Seattle Cascades (UFA) (2025–present); Seattle Tempest (WUL) (2025–present)

Interbay Stadium is a 900-seat soccer-specific stadium in the Interbay neighborhood in Seattle, Washington. The stadium was built in 1997 for the Seattle Pacific Falcons collegiate soccer teams and is also used by semi-professional soccer clubs Ballard FC of USL League Two and Salmon Bay FC of the USL W League. It has a grass pitch and a maximum capacity of 1,200 spectators when including standing areas. In 2023, Ballard FC signed a sponsorship agreement with Pagliacci Pizza, a local chain, to rename the pitch to the Pagliacci Pitch. During the ongoing demolition and reconstruction of the nearby Memorial Stadium, Interbay Stadium serves as the home venue for the Seattle Cascades and Seattle Tempest ultimate frisbee teams.

== History ==
In 2002, the Seattle Sounders of the second division A-League hosted multiple games at Interbay Stadium, including a 2002 U.S. Open Cup tie against the San José Earthquakes, before the opening of the team's new home at Seahawks Stadium. Ballard FC temporarily moved to Memorial Stadium at the Seattle Center for the 2024 regular season while renovations at Interbay Stadium were made to comply with accessibility requirements, returning to Interbay Stadium for the 2024 playoffs.

In March 2026, the club announced a privately-funded expansion project at Interbay Stadium, adding 267 seats along the southeast touchline ahead of the 2026 season. A future second phase is planned for 2027, contingent upon community support, and would increase capacity by an additional 267 seats while adding the stadium's first covered seating.
