= Utah United =

American soccer club based in Utah

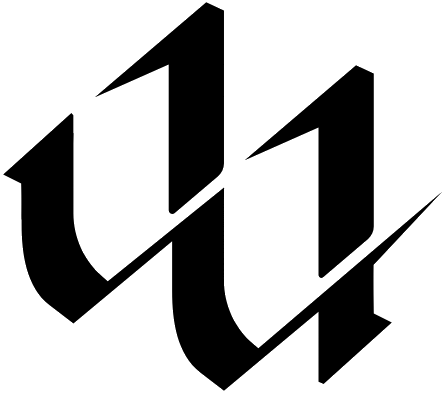
- Founded: 2023; 3 years ago
- Stadium: Clyde Field; Orem, Utah, U.S.
- Head coach: Mark Davis
- League: USL League Two
- 2026: 2nd, Mountain Division; Playoffs: Western Conf. Quarterfinals
- Website: utahunitedsoccer.com
Home colors

Utah United is an American soccer club based in Orem, Utah, competing in the Mountain Division of USL League Two (men) and USL W League (women). The men began play in the 2024 season and the women in 2025. The teams play their home matches at Clyde Field on the campus of Utah Valley University.

The club has also a U20 team.

== History ==
The club was founded in 2023 by Mark Davis and Travis Hill. It is based in Orem and plays matches at Clyde Field.

Utah United men made their league debut on May 23, 2024, defeating Colorado International Soccer Academy 3–0 on the road. The team finished third in the USL2 Mountain Division behind Boulder County United and Flatirons SC.

The men finished considerably better in the 2025 season, earning first place in the Mountain Division.

The women's team began play in the USL W League in the 2025 season. They did well, winning their division to qualify for the league playoffs, progressing through the playoffs, and ultimately winning the final to become 2025 USL W champions.

== Stadium ==
Utah United plays their home matches at Clyde Field in Orem, Utah. The stadium is primarily operated by the Utah Valley Wolverines collegiate soccer teams.

== Players and staff ==
=== Technical staff ===
Technical staff of Utah United
Position	Name
Head coach	(United States) Mark Davis
Director of Coaching	(United States) Travis Hill
Assistant coach	(United States) Anel Lilic
Assistant coach	(United States) Trentin Atkin

=== Roster ===
Utah United roster
Name	Number
(United States) Ethan Zamora	2
(United States) Alex Fritcher	7
(United States) Alejandro Silva	8
(United States) Daniel Tareke	16
(United States) Roark Looney	21
(United States) David Noguera	21
(United States) Joseph Umberto Picotto	21
(United States) Jordan Welker	21
(United States) Damian Arguello	34
(United States) Chase Radford	99

== Year-by-year ==
=== Men's team ===
Season records for Utah United
Year	Division	League	Regular season	Playoffs	Open Cup
2024	4	USL League Two	3rd, Mountain	Did not qualify	Did not qualify
2025	4	USL League Two	1st, Mountain	Conference Quarterfinals	Did not qualify
2026	4	USL League Two	2nd, Mountain	Conference Quarterfinals	Did not qualify

=== Women's team ===
Season records for Utah United
Year	Division	League	Regular season	Playoffs
2025	4	USL W League	1st, Mountain	Champions
2026	4	USL W League	3rd, Mountain	Did not qualify

== Honors ==
=== Men's team ===
==== League ====
- USL League Two Mountain Division
  - Champions (1): 2025

=== Women's team ===
==== League ====
- USL W League
  - Champions (1): 2025
- USL W League Mountain Division
  - Champions (1): 2025
