= Ballard FC =

American soccer club based in Seattle

- Full name: Ballard Football Club
- Nickname: The Bridges
- Founded: December 1, 2021; 4 years ago
- Stadium: Interbay Stadium; Seattle, Washington, U.S.
- Capacity: 900
- Owners: Lamar Neagle; Chris Kaimmer; Sam Zisette
- Head coach: Pedro Millan
- League: USL League Two
- 2026: 1st, Northwest Division; Playoffs: TBD
- Website: goballardfc.com
Home colors	Away colors	Third colors

Ballard FC is an American soccer club based in Seattle, Washington, competing in the Northwest Division of USL League Two. They began play in the 2022 season and won their first league championship in 2023. The team plays their home matches at Interbay Stadium alongside their women's affiliate, Salmon Bay FC. Their temporary home venue for the 2024 season was Memorial Stadium at the Seattle Center.

== History ==
The club was founded in 2021 and is owned by former Seattle Sounders FC player Lamar Neagle, Chris Kaimmer, and Sam Zisette. It is based in the Ballard neighborhood and would play home matches at the Interbay Stadium. The club's largest supporters' group is The Bridge Keepers.

Ballard FC made their league debut on May 21, 2022, defeating Lane United FC 6–1 in front of 1,200 spectators. The team finished second in the USL2 Northwest Division behind Oregon's Capital FC and qualified for the league playoffs. They advanced to the Western Conference Final in Des Moines, Iowa, where Ballard FC lost 2–1 to the eventual league champions Ventura County Fusion. Captain and defender Lesia Thetsane was a finalist for the USL2 Player of the Year Award and was one of 14 players to return for the club's second season in 2023.

Head coach Jason Farrell left the club in July 2023 after they had clinched a playoff berth and was replaced by Ethan O'Neill on an interim basis. Ballard FC secured their first Northwest Division title and hosted several playoff matches at Interbay Stadium. The club advanced to the USL League Two Championship, which they would host at Starfire Sports Stadium in Tukwila, Washington, against Lionsbridge FC on August 5, 2023. Ballard FC won their first championship 2–1 with a goal in stoppage time scored by Cameron Martin in front of a sellout crowd of 3,416. The club are the second from Washington to win the league's championship, after Kitsap Pumas in 2011, and earned qualification to the 2024 U.S. Open Cup.

On March 20, 2024, Ballard FC played their first U.S. Open Cup match at Memorial Stadium, their temporary home during year-long renovations to Interbay Soccer Field. The team lost 1–0 to Spokane Velocity FC, a new USL League One team based in the state. The two teams met again in the first round of the 2025 U.S. Open Cup and played to a scoreless draw in regulation time at Interbay Stadium in front of a record 1,508 spectators. Spokane won 1–0 in extra time.

== Stadium ==
Ballard FC plays their home matches at Interbay Stadium, a 900-seat soccer-specific stadium in the Interbay neighborhood south of Ballard. The stadium was built in 1997 for the Seattle Pacific Falcons collegiate soccer teams and is also used by Ballard's sister team Salmon Bay FC. It has a grass pitch and a maximum capacity of 1,200 spectators when including standing areas. In 2023, Ballard FC signed a sponsorship agreement with Pagliacci Pizza, a local chain, to rename the pitch to the Pagliacci Pitch.

The team temporarily moved to Memorial Stadium at the Seattle Center for the 2024 regular season while renovations at Interbay Stadium were made to comply with accessibility requirements, returning to Interbay Stadium for the 2024 playoffs.

In March 2026, the club announced a privately-funded expansion project at Interbay Stadium, adding 267 seats along the southeast touchline ahead of the 2026 season. A future second phase is planned for 2027, contingent upon community support, and would increase capacity by an additional 267 seats while adding the stadium's first covered seating.

== Club identity ==
The club crest, designed by a Ballard-based agency, was released alongside the founding announcement in December 2022. The crest depicts the Ballard Bridge over a sunset.

Ballard FC's primary jersey is cream-colored with red accents; the inaugural 2022–23 home jersey included a sublimated wave pattern derived the Flag of Seattle. The club collaborates with local artists for third jerseys each year, such as Seattle-based muralists Ryan Henry "henry" Ward, dozfy, and Stevie Shao. The 2025 and 2026 third kits in this artist series, created by Sarah Robbins and Victor Meléndez respectively, have been jointly worn by Ballard FC and Salmon Bay FC, with each club's crest applied lenticularly so as to both appear.

Home

2022	2023–24	2025–

Away

2022–23	2024–25	2026–

Third

2022 henry	2023 dozfy	2024; Stevie; Shao	2025; Sarah; Robbins	2026; Victor Meléndez

Goalkeeper

2026–

== Players and staff ==
=== Technical staff ===
Technical staff of Ballard FC
Position	Name
Head coach	(Venezuela) Pedro Millan
First assistant coach	(Zambia) Mutanda Kwesele
Assistant coach	(United States) Josh Chasan
Head of goalkeeping	(United States) Ben Dragavon
Assistant GK coach	(United States) Sean Rash
Head of strength & conditioning	(United States) Bo Pearson

=== Roster ===
Ballard FC roster
Position	Name	Number
Defender	(United States) Christian Engmann	2
Forward	(United States) Austin Brummett	5
Midfielder	(United States) Joe Dale	8
Forward	(United States) Richie Aman	11
Midfielder	(United States) Ray Mendez	15
Forward	(United States) Elliot Spatz	17
Defender	(United States) Isaac Ketcham	20
Midfielder	(United States) Sean Sent	23
Forward	(United States) Charlie Holmes	25
Midfielder	(United States) Rafi Otero	8
Midfielder	(Armenia) Andre Philibbosian	26
Midfielder	(United States) Cameron Cruz	27
Goalkeeper	(United States) Charlie Lanphier	30
Defender	(United States) Luke Hammond	33

== Year-by-year ==
Season records for Ballard FC
Year	Division	League	Regular season	Playoffs	U.S. Open Cup
2022	4	USL League Two	2nd, Northwest Division	Conference Finals	Did not enter
2023	4	USL League Two	1st, Northwest Division	Champions	Did not qualify
2024	4	USL League Two	1st, Northwest Division	Conference Quarterfinals	1st Round
2025	4	USL League Two	1st, Northwest Division	Runners-up	1st Round
2026	4	USL League Two	1st, Northwest Division	Conference Finals	4th Qualifying Round

== Honors ==
=== League ===
- USL League Two Playoffs
  - Champions (1): 2023
  - Runners-up (1): 2025
- USL League Two Western Conference
  - Champions (2): 2023, 2025
- USL League Two Northwest Division
  - Champions (4): 2023, 2024, 2025, 2026

=== Player ===
Honored players on Ballard FC
Year	Player	Country	Pos	Honor
2022	Ian Mejia	USA	FW	All-Western Conference Team
2022	Lesia Thetsane	LES	DF	All-Western Conference Team
2023	Lesia Thetsane	LES	DF	Team of the Year
2023	Stas Korzeniowski	USA	FW	Northwest Division Player of the Year
2024	Christian Engmann	USA	DF	Team of the Year
2025	Abeselom Zemenfes	ETH	MF	Western Conference Player of the Year

MLS SuperDraft selections
Draft	Round	Overall	Player	Team
2024	3	54	(United States) Stas Korzeniowski	Philadelphia Union
2025	2	58	(United States) Demian Alvarez	Seattle Sounders FC
2026	1	8	(United States) Richie Aman	D.C. United
2026	1	17	(United States) Zach Ramsey	Vancouver Whitecaps FC
2026	2	51	(United States) Joe Dale	Seattle Sounders FC
2026	3	78	(United States) Austin Brummett	Houston Dynamo FC
2026	3	81	(United States) Stockton Short	Seattle Sounders FC
