= List of professional sports teams in Oregon =

Oregon is the 27th most populated state in the United States and has a rich history of professional sports.

== Active teams ==
=== Major league teams ===
Oregon is home to two major professional sports teams. Both of the teams play in Portland.

Basketball
League	Team	City	Arena	Capacity
NBA	Portland Trail Blazers	Portland	Moda Center	19,393
Soccer
League	Team	City	Stadium	Capacity
MLS	Portland Timbers	Portland	Providence Park	25,218

=== Other professional sports teams ===
Arena football
League	Team	City	Arena	Capacity
AF1	Oregon Lightning	Redmond	First Interstate Bank Center	4,000
Baseball
League	Team	City	Stadium	Capacity
NWL (High-A)	Eugene Emeralds	Eugene	PK Park	4,000
NWL (High-A)	Hillsboro Hops	Hillsboro	Hillsboro Ballpark	3,534
Basketball
League	Team	City	Arena	Capacity
G-League	Rip City Remix	Portland	Chiles Center	4,852
WNBA	Portland Fire	Portland	Moda Center	19,393
Soccer
League	Team	City	Stadium	Capacity
MLSNP	Portland Timbers 2	Portland	Providence Park	25,218
USL1	Sporting Cascades FC	Eugene	Civic Stadium	3,500
NWSL	Portland Thorns FC	Portland	Providence Park	25,218
Ultimate
League	Team	City	Stadium	Capacity
UFA	Oregon Steel	Portland	Hilken Community Stadium	1,000

=== Map of cities with a professional sports team ===
Location with a professional sports team

== See also ==
- Sports in Oregon
