= Civic Park (Eugene, Oregon) =

Soccer stadium in Eugene, Oregon, United States

- Location in the United States Location in Oregon
- Interactive map of Civic Park
- Address: 2077 Willamette St, Eugene, OR 97405
- Coordinates: 44°2′1.605″N 123°5′27.502″W
- Owner: Eugene Civic Alliance
- Operator: Eugene Civic Alliance
- Capacity: 3,500
- Surface: Artificial Turf

Construction
- Groundbreaking: October 7, 2018
- Opened: June 6, 2020; 6 years ago
- Cost: $48 million (phases one & two)
- Architects: Robertson / Sherwood; Skylab Architect
- Builder: Chambers Construction

Tenant
- Sporting Cascades FC (USL1) (2027–future); Bushnell University Beacons (2024–present); Lane United FC (USL2) (2021–2025)

Website
- playcivicpark.com

Civic Park is a multi-use sports complex in the northwestern United States, located in Eugene, Oregon. It is the home to the professional soccer team Sporting Cascades FC of USL League One, as well as the Bushnell University soccer teams. Opened in June 2020, it succeeds Civic Stadium, the city's baseball and American football venue that burnt down in 2015.

== History ==
=== Background ===
Built in 1938 through a public-private partnership between the Eugene Area Chamber of Commerce, Eugene School District 4J, and the Works Progress Administration (WPA), Civic Stadium was continuously owned by the school district from its construction until spring 2015. Added to the National Register of Historic Places in 2008, the stadium formerly hosted football and baseball, and was the home of the Eugene Emeralds minor league baseball team from 1969 to 2009. Abandoned following Emeralds move, the stadium was destroyed in June 2015, when a fire set by four pre-pubescent boys.

=== Planning and construction (2015–2020) ===
Planning for reimagination on the site of Civic Stadium was already in the works as early as 2011, which included plans to incorporate the old stadium's main grandstand into the new stadium. These plans were picked up in spring 2015 when non-profit organization Eugene Civic Alliance bought the abandoned stadium from the school district, but following the stadium fire, the old grandstand was rendered unsalvageable.

New plans for both a smaller rectangular turf field made primary for soccer and a 44,000 square foot indoor gymnasium were eventually drafted. Architects were chosen to design the new complex that was imagined to be at the site. The cost of the first phase of the site costed $30 million, funded by donations from both organizations and private donators. A groundbreaking ceremony was hosted on October 7, 2018.

=== Opening and expansion (2020–present) ===
Although the park was ready by Spring 2020, due to the COVID-19 pandemic the grand opening of Civic Park was delayed until it was determined to be safe for the opening ceremony to be held. The grand opening was officially held on June 6, 2020, with the Kidsports Fieldhouse and the outdoor turf field opened for use. In August 2022, the first phase was fully funded, and the total $48 million to complete the two phases of Civic Park was finally reached in April 2026. The second phase included the construction of the grandstand for the outdoor turf field, an outdoor scoreboard, and live broadcasting facilities, amongst further improvements to the site.

== Facility ==
Civic Park has two main facilities: The Market of Choice Field and the Kidsports Fieldhouse.

=== Market of Choice Field ===
Market of Choice Field is the 3,500-seat outdoor stadium at Civic Park. The home of Bushnell University's soccer teams and the future home of third-division Sporting Cascades FC, the stadium cost around $42 to complete. The stadium is able to host various outdoor sports, including soccer, American football, and Ultimate Frisbee, amongst others. The soccer stadium has a 2,500-seat main grandstand, locker rooms, and a digital scoreboard.

The stadium is sponsored by Market of Choice, a supermarket chain based in Eugene. The company is a major contributor to funding the construction and expansion of Civic Park, having ran a funding campaign that doubled every dollar donated towards funding the stadium in 2020.

=== Kidsports Fieldhouse ===
Kidsports Fieldhouse is a 40,000 square-foot indoor sports facility. The fieldhouse has four indoor hardwood courts and two outdoor courts, which can be configured to fit basketball and volleyball, as well as other sports. Various events have been hosted inside the fieldhouse, from tournaments to sports camps.
