= Lane United FC =

American soccer club

Lane United
- Full name: Lane United Football Club
- Nickname: The Reds
- Founded: 2013; 13 years ago
- Dissolved: 2025
- Stadium: Civic Park
- Owner(s): Redside Sports, LLC
- Managing director: David J. Galas
- Head Coach: USL2: John Galas
- League: Men: USL League Two; Women: USL W League
- 2023: USL2: 5th, Northwest Division; Playoffs: DNQ
- Website: http://www.laneutd.com
Home colors	Away colors

Lane United FC was an American soccer club based in Eugene, Oregon, named for Lane County, where Eugene is located. Founded in 2013, the men's team last played in USL League Two, the fourth tier of the American soccer pyramid. The club organized an amateur women's team, which competed in the USL W League starting in 2023, and announced a professional women's team to compete in the first-tier USL Super League in 2024. In 2025 they announced that the club was disbanding to make way for Sporting Cascades FC in USL League One.

== History ==
=== 2013 ===
Lane United was admitted into the USL Premier Development League on July 18, 2013. To raise local interest in the club, a team was quickly assembled for two friendlies during the late summer of 2013. The first match, held at South Eugene High School on July 18 saw the Reds lose to the Portland Timbers U23s, 0–3. The club then went on to earn its first victory against Southern Oregon Fuego 4–0 at Sheldon High School on August 23, with midfielder Loren Hill notching the club's first-ever goal.

=== 2014 ===
In early 2014, the club entered into an agreement to use the Willamalane Center in Springfield, Oregon as a home field through 2016. Construction on a new playing surface and grandstand began soon after the announcement. Lane United also announced a three-year kit sponsorship with Oakshire Brewing, a local brewery based in the Whiteaker neighborhood of Eugene. The club slowly added commitments from college players and eventually finished out the 2014 roster with signings from open tryouts in April.

The season opened on May 16 against Seattle Sounders FC U-23, with Lane United earning its first league win on a goal from Connor Bevans. The Reds earned subsequent good home results against the Washington Crossfire and the Puget Sound Gunners before falling into a skid, losing all six games in the month of June. The club seemingly regained momentum with a late draw against Timbers U23s on July 1, but suffered narrow defeats against Vancouver Whitecaps U-23s, Victoria Highlanders, and Timbers in the final three games of the league season. Lane United finished off the season with a home exhibition match against Vancouver Victory of the Evergreen Premier League, which the Reds won comfortably, 2–0.

Lane United finished with eight points on the season, good for last place in the Northwest Division of the PDL.

In December, Lane United was awarded PDL Rookie Franchise of the Year at the United Soccer Leagues Annual General Meeting.

=== 2015 ===
Lane United began their 2015 season with a non-league home game against South Sound FC that ended in a 3–1 victory for LUFC. The Reds' early victory was followed by two losses against Portland Timbers U23s and Kitsap Pumas, a 3–3 tie versus Puget Sound Gunners FC and two losses to the Seattle Sounders FC U-23 and the Washington Crossfire. Midway through the season, Lane United reversed their early losing streak and went 3–1–1 with a tie against Calgary Foothills FC, wins over Vancouver Victory, Puget Sound Gunners FC, and Liga Unida XI, and a loss to Seattle Sounders FC U-23.

After a second loss to the Kitsap Pumas, LUFC went on a three-game winning streak versus the Portland Timbers U23s, the Washington Crossfire, and Bellingham United FC before ending the season with a loss to Calgary Foothills FC. The Reds ended the season 3–7–2 earning 5th place in the USL PDL Western Conference Northwest Division. Lane United FC forward Timmy Mueller was named to the USL PDL's All-League team for his outstanding season that included nine goals in eleven games.

=== 2016 ===
Lane United's 2016 season began with a win for the Reds when they defeated the Portland Timbers U23s 1–0, in their first game of the season at Tualatin Hills Athletic Center. They continued earning points at home and on the road with three consecutive ties vs Kitsap Pumas (0–0), Victoria Highlanders (0–0), and Portland Timbers U23s (3–3), before recording their first loss of the season to the Seattle Sounders FC U-23 (2–1).

The Reds rallied after that loss, earning a draw two days later against Washington Crossfire (0–0), and wins against South Sound FC (non-league friendly) (1–0), Seattle Sounders FC U-23 (3–1), and Calgary Foothills FC (1–0). The Reds lost a bit of momentum in the later half of the season, beginning with a loss at home to Calgary Foothills FC (1–0) and followed by a draw against non-league rival Club Jalisco (0–0), and a 1–0 loss at home to the Portland Timbers U23s.

The last four games of the season had a lot riding on them with a chance for Lane United to earn a spot in the Northwest Division Playoffs and the US Open Cup. Lane United kept their playoff hopes alive with a 1–1 tie against Washington Crossfire on the road but their dream was cut short by a 2–1 loss to the Kitsap Pumas four days later. The Reds ended the season with a 2–2 draw against the Victoria Highlanders and a 3–1 loss to the Washington Crossfire to finish sixth in the PDL Northwest Division.

=== 2020 ===
On March 26, 2020, came a day that left Reds' fans with nothing but disappointment. Lane United had hoped to open their new 2020 season at Civic Park, the new home pitch for the club that had created a lot of anticipation for the Reds. Ultimately—due to COVID-19—Lane United had to cancel the season for the ultimate health and safety of all the loyal Reds supporters, partners, players, and coaches. The remaining teams in the Northwest Division followed suit shortly thereafter with the league announcing the cancellation of the entire 2020 USL League Two season on April 30.

=== 2021 ===
Lane United FC opened up play at Civic Park on May 29, 2021. The opening match resulted in a 3-3 draw with Portland side International Portland Select FC in a non-league friendly.

After initially hiring Manny Martins to manage the team, Martins left prior to the start of the league season for the Head Coaching position with the Utah State Women's Team. Lane United brought on Jason Carney, also the Director of Coaching for the FC Portland Soccer Academy, to fill the void.

From there, the season was in full swing and was filled with many highs including The Reds first win at Civic Park on June 19 in a 3-0 win against OVF Alliance. The main highlight was the club winning the 2021 Oregon Open Cup, the first-ever piece of silverware for LUFC. After a 3-0 semi-final win against FC Swoosh that included a brace from Reds midfielder Henry Cromack, Lane United took down USL2 league foe OVF Alliance 4-2 in penalty kicks after the initial 90 minutes ended nil-nil. Goalkeeper Albert Escuin made several crucial saves during the game and stopped one of the penalties to earn Man of the Match honors.

Unfortunately for Lane, the league season in USL League Two did not have the same success as in the Oregon Open Cup, as the club finished fourth in the Northwest Division. The Reds, however, did have some standout players in the 2021 season including the team's leading goal-scorer from Spain, José Carlos González who finished the USL League Two season with 6 goals along with providing one assist. The Reds also saw the emergence of 17 year-old Canadian Henry Cromack, who was on target with 3 goals and 1 assist during league play, along with his two goals in the Oregon Open Cup semifinal. Albert Escuin was also another notable player for the Reds as he made a staggering 46 saves in 8 matches. All three players were named to the USL League Two Western Conference Team of the Year.

=== 2025 ===
In the summer of 2025 the club announced it was disbanding to make way for Sporting Cascades FC in USL League One. The ownership of the League One club stated that they could continue to use the branding for the women's team, and may revive the League Two side in the future.

== Crest and colors ==
Club Crest

The crest is a traditional circular badge design, with the club name wrapped around a central emblem. Inside the circle is the red image of a Dawn Redwood above the Mckenzie and Willamette rivers that run through the heart of Lane County. Underneath the imagery lies the number 2013, signifying the club's founding date.

The traditional home kit is a red shirt, shorts, and socks, the source of the club's nickname. On away days, the club's kits have varied, but most recently they've worn a teal shirt with gray shorts. Lane United wears a simplified version of the crest on its shirts, featuring the tree and three lines alone. The letters "LUFC" underline the emblem.

== Kit manufacturers and shirt sponsors ==
Period	Kit manufacturer	Shirt partner
2013	Adidas	Ninkasi Brewing Company
2014–2016	Adidas	Oakshire Brewing
2017–2018	Hummel	Oakshire Brewing
2019–2020	Hummel	Agate Alley
2021––2022	Hummel	SheerID

== Stadiums ==
After playing at two different high schools during the summer of 2013, the club entered into an agreement with Willamalane Parks and Recreation District to play at the Willamalane Center in Springfield through the 2016 season. The spartan facilities include a FieldTurf playing surface, metal grandstand with seating for approximately 1,000 spectators, and permanent outdoor field lighting.

Lane United played its 2019 season at Marist High School in northern Eugene.

Lane United is a member of the Eugene Civic Alliance, a consortium of local community groups and businesses that recently acquired Civic Stadium in south Eugene. Previously home to the Eugene Emeralds, the Civic Alliance aims to modernize the stadium for use by Lane United Football Club and construct a fieldhouse on the property for use by a local youth sports organization. Club officials have stated the need for a home venue with a higher attendance capacity in order to grow the club and eventually join the United Soccer League as a fully professional side.

Civic Stadium was destroyed in a fire on June 29, 2015. However, the Eugene Civic Alliance aims to reuse the site, erecting a multi-use stadium with Lane United as a primary tenant as well as other amenities. The rebuilt stadium will be known as Civic Park.

Lane United was scheduled to play its home games at the new Civic Park starting in the 2020 USL League Two season, but after that season was canceled due to COVID-19, the club played there until 2025, when the club ended.

== Support ==
By September 2013, an independent supporters group had formed, known as the Red Aces . The group achieved non-profit status and were subsequently granted a small ownership stake in the club itself. Aside from supporting the team during games, the Red Aces were advocates for the club's acquisition and renovation of Civic Stadium in Eugene.

On matchdays, the Red Aces could be found at the south end of the Willamalane Center grandstand, displaying tifo and encouraging a raucous atmosphere. They most recently occupied the southwest side at Civic Park.

== Ownership ==
The club was owned by Redside Sports, LLC, a limited liability company formed in the summer of 2013 to finance the franchise. The chief stakeholders in the group are: David G. Elmore (Elmore Sports Group), owner of the Eugene Emeralds and several other minor-league sports teams in the American West, and local businessmen Frank Nakatsuma and Joe Hawes. Several minority shareholders and the Red Aces supporters group also control the LLC.

== Players and staff ==
=== Technical staff ===
Position	Name

=== Current roster ===
Position	Name	Number

== Honors ==
- Oregon Open Cup: 2021

== Year-by-year ==
=== Men ===
Year	Division	League	Matches	W	L	T	Pts	Regular season	Playoffs	Open Cup
2014	4	USL PDL	14	2	10	2	8	8th of 8, Northwest	did not qualify	did not qualify
2015	4	USL PDL	12	3	7	2	11	5th of 7, Northwest	did not qualify	did not qualify
2016	4	USL PDL	14	3	5	6	15	6th of 7, Northwest	did not qualify	did not qualify
2017	4	USL PDL	14	3	6	5	14	5th of 6, Northwest	did not qualify	did not qualify
2018	4	USL PDL	14	5	4	5	20	3rd of 6, Northwest	did not qualify	did not qualify
2019	4	USL League Two	14	5	4	5	20	3rd of 6, Northwest	did not qualify	did not qualify
2020	4	USL League Two	0	0	0	0	0	Season cancelled due to COVID-19 pandemic		
2021	4	USL League Two	12	1	9	2	5	4th of 4, Northwest	did not qualify	did not qualify
2022	4	USL League Two	12	3	3	6	15	3rd of 6, Northwest	did not qualify	did not qualify
2023	4	USL League Two	12	3	5	4	13	5th of 6, Northwest	did not qualify	did not qualify
2024	4	USL League Two	14	4	7	3	15	6th of 8, Northwest	did not qualify	did not qualify
10 Seasons			132	32	60	40	1.03 PPG		0 Appearances	0 Appearances

=== Women ===
Year	League	Matches	W	L	T	Pts	Regular season	Playoffs
2023	USL W League	10	2	6	2	8	3rd of 5, Northwest	did not qualify
2024	USL W League	10	1	7	2	5	5th of 5, Northwest	did not qualify
2025	USL W League	10	2	5	3	9	4th of 6, Northwest	did not qualify
3 Seasons	–	30	8	18	7	0.80 PPG	–	0 Appearances
