= Civic Stadium =

Civic Stadium may refer to:

- Civic Stadium (Eugene, Oregon) in Eugene, Oregon

Other places formerly called Civic Stadium:

- Oshawa Civic Auditorium in Oshawa, Ontario
- Ivor Wynne Stadium in Hamilton, Ontario
- Providence Park in Portland, Oregon
- War Memorial Stadium (Buffalo, New York) in Buffalo, New York
