= John Galas =

American soccer coach (1972–2026)

Personal information
- Date of birth: March 25, 1972
- Place of birth: Walnut Creek, California, U.S.
- Date of death: March 16, 2026 (aged 53)

Managerial career
- Years: Team
- 2000–2003: Florida State Seminoles (assistant)
- 2003–2005: Oregon Ducks (assistant)
- 2006–2007: Portland Timbers (assistant)
- 2007–2011: Arizona Wildcats (assistant)
- 2011–2013: Real Salt Lake Academy AZ (director of goalkeeping)
- 2013: Portland Thorns (assistant)
- 2013–2019: Lane United
- 2016–2017: Villarreal B (assistant)
- 2019–2020: FC Tucson (assistant)
- 2020–2021: FC Tucson

John Galas (March 25, 1972 – March 16, 2026) was an American soccer coach.

== Early life ==
Galas was born in Walnut Creek, California; he moved to Switzerland with his family when he was six years old. When he returned to the United States four years later, Galas joined Los Angeles' youth soccer scene and later played in junior college. In 1997, he earned a Bachelor of Arts degree from the University of Oregon. In 1999, he earned a Master of Business Administration in Football Industries from the University of Liverpool.

== Coaching career ==
Prior to coaching in more prominent roles, Galas served as the head coach for the Boys Under-18 team at the Oregon United Soccer Academy, as the goalkeeper coach for the Region IV Olympic Development Program in Moscow, Idaho, and as the goalkeeping coach for Liverpool's Community Coaching Program.

In July 2000, Galas became assistant coach at Florida State University. After three seasons he was named assistant at the University of Oregon. Whilst in Oregon, Galas later served as an assistant coach with United Soccer League side Portland Timbers.

In 2007, Galas moved to the University of Arizona as an assistant, before been named associate head coach in 2009.

Following his spell at the University of Arizona, Galas became director of goalkeeping at Real Salt Lake's academy in Casa Grande, Arizona.

Galas made the move to NWSL side Portland Thorns as their assistant in 2013. Later that year, he was named the sporting director and head coach of USL PDL side Lane United. Whilst with Lane United, Galas spent the off season between 2016 and 2017 to become assistant coach with Segunda División B side Villarreal B.

On January 11, 2019, Galas became assistant to head coach Darren Sawatzky at USL League One side FC Tucson. He then took over the head coaching position in January 2020, following Sawatzky's dismissal at the end of their inaugural League One season.

On June 29, 2021, Galas and Tucson mutually agreed to terminate his position at the club.

On January 28, 2022, it was announced that Galas had returned to Lane United FC as their head coach ahead of the 2022 USL League Two season.

== Death ==
Galas died on March 16, 2026, at the age of 53, after being diagnosed with synovial sarcoma in 2023.
