= Price Chopper =

Price Chopper may refer to:

== United States ==
- Price Chopper (Northeastern United States), a supermarket chain based in Schenectady, New York, with stores in eastern United States
  - Price Chopper Tour Championship, a golf tournament in the Albany, New York, area that has operated until several different names
- Price Chopper (Midwestern United States), an association of supermarket chains based in Kansas City, Missouri, with stores in the central United States
  - Price Chopper 400, a stock car race in Kansas City, Kansas, that has operated until several different names
- Price Chopper (Oregon), a defunct supermarket chain based in Eugene, Oregon, previous name of the Market of Choice supermarket chain

== Elsewhere ==
- Price Chopper (Canada), a defunct supermarket chain in the Ontario area that operated from the 1990s to 2020, now operating as FreshCo
- Price Chopper (New Zealand), a defunct supermarket group that operated from 1987 to 2004, under the Woolworths brand

== See also ==
- Price Cutter Park, a baseball stadium in Christian County, Missouri
- Price Cutter Charity Championship, a golf tournament held in Springfield, Missouri
