= Sam Bond's Garage =

Music venue and pub in Whiteaker, Eugene

Coordinates: 44.055242°N 123.108752°W

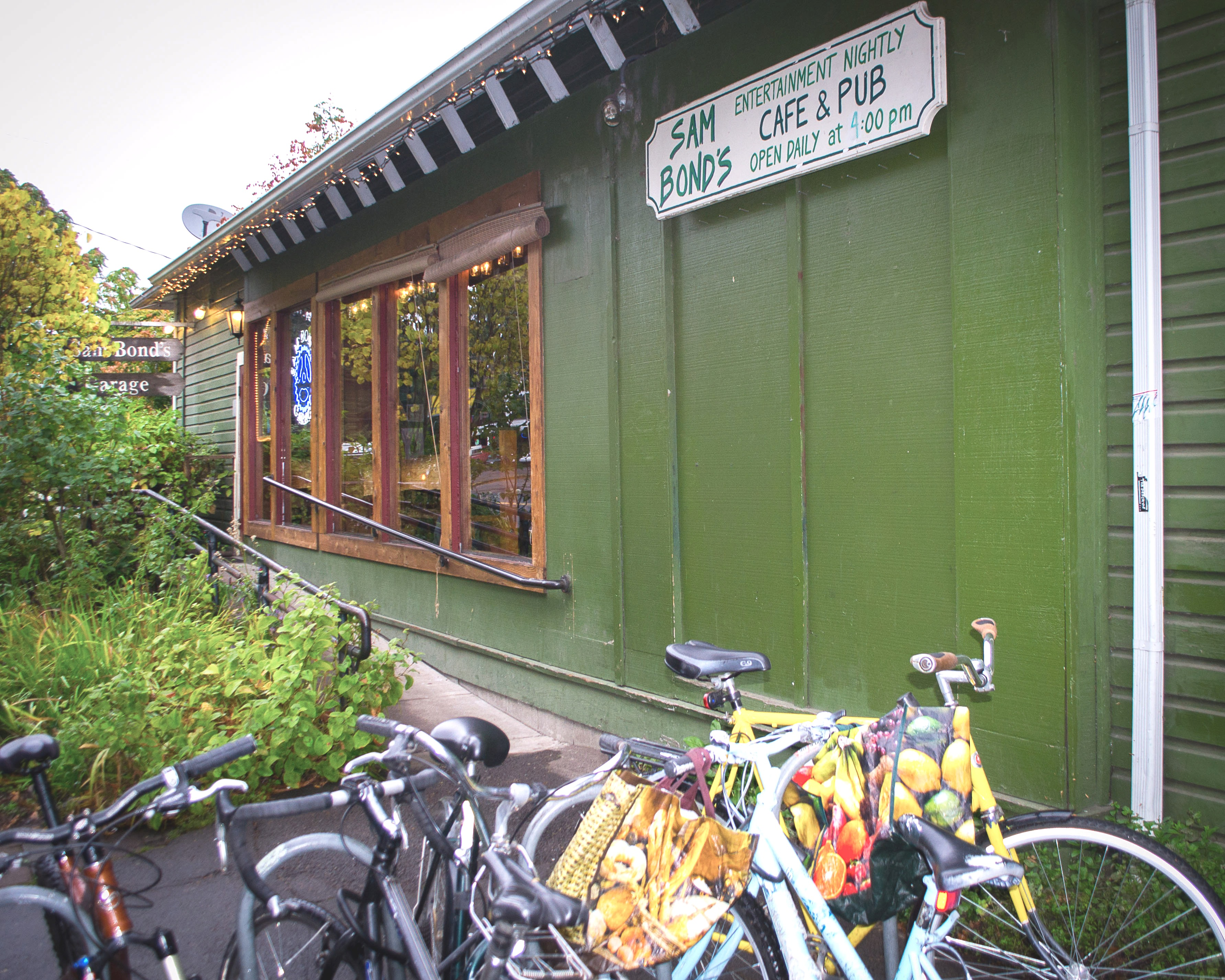
- Interactive map of Sam Bond's Garage
- Address: 407 Blair Blvd
- Location: Eugene, Oregon
- Owner: Mark Jaeger, Bart Caridio, Todd Davis
- Type: Restaurant and music venue
- Event: Bohemian

Website
- http://www.sambonds.com/

Sam Bonds Garage is a music venue and pub in the Whiteaker neighborhood of Eugene, Oregon, United States. It has been voted as one of America's best bars by Esquire.

== History ==
Sam C. Bond was the grandson of Eugene-area pioneers Allen and Rachel Bond, owners of a 320-acre donation land claim awarded in 1853 on the current site of the Eugene Airport. Bond operated a garage on Blair Street, constructed sometime between 1918 and 1923, although Bond purchased the property in 1926. Active in local politics, Bond served on the Eugene City Council from 1930 to 1942 and was credited in the site survey for the Eugene Blair Boulevard Commercial Area as having guided Eugene through the Great Depression. Bond retired from the garage in 1972.

The building became a Eugene night spot in 1995, when Sam Bond's Garage opened and began showcasing regional music talent.
