= Port St. Lucie SC =

Soccer club based in Port St. Lucie, Florida

Port St. Lucie
- Full name: Port St. Lucie Sports Club
- Founded: 2025; 1 year ago
- Ground: Walton & One Stadium; Port St. Lucie, Florida
- Capacity: 6,000
- Owners: Agostina Galimberti; Gustavo Suárez; Paulo Suárez
- League: USL League One (men's)
- Website: portstluciesc.com
Home colors

Port St. Lucie Sports Club is an American professional soccer club based in Port St. Lucie, Florida. Founded and co-owned by Agostina Galimberti, Gustavo Suárez, and Paulo Suárez, the club plans to field a team into USL League One, a men's Division 3 league in the United States league system, in the 2027 season. It also plans to field a women's team in the future. It will play its home games at the Walton & One Stadium.

The club was founded as an anchor tenant for the stadium, which serves as the centerpiece of a broader mixed-use real estate development project by the Port St. Lucie City Council. Its crest, a badge depicting an anchor, references the Treasure Coast.

== History ==
Port St. Lucie SC was founded by Argentine entrepreneurs Agostina Galimberti, Gustavo Suárez, and his son Paulo in 2025, with financial backing from a group of investors. It was established as the anchor tenant for a soccer-specific stadium at the Port St. Lucie City Council's Walton & One mixed-use real estate development project. Billed by the council as the project's centerpiece, the stadium's construction was procured through a public–private partnership with a consortium, Ebenezer Stadium LLC, who'll be reimbursed for half of its $55 million cost by the council's redevelopment agency for twenty years following its completion.

Satisfied by this arrangement, the United Soccer League (USL) granted USL League One franchise rights to Port St. Lucie SC in October 2025. At a special meeting of council at the MidFlorida Event Center that same month, the club's establishment and enfranchisement, along with the stadium plans, were simultaneously announced to the public. Port St. Lucie SC plans to commence play in USL League One in the 2027 season. A women's team is also being planned by the club to commence play afterwards.

== Identity ==
The club's full name is the Port St. Lucie Sports Club. Its branding uses aquamarine and black as its primary colors, with white and a shade of red referred to as "red marine" used as accents. The club's crest, designed by Matthew Wolff, depicting an anchor, pays homage to the maritime iconography of the Treasure Coast, where the club is situated.

== Organization ==
Port St. Lucie SC's ownership group is led by its co-founders, Agostina Galimberti, Gustavo Suárez, and Paulo Suárez; and includes an as yet unnamed group of investors.

== Stadium ==
Port St. Lucie SC will play its home games at the Walton & One Stadium, a planned 6,000-seat soccer-specific stadium to be situated in the namesake Walton & One complex, located on the corner of Walton Road and U.S. Route 1 (27°17′48″N 80°18′02″W). The total cost of the stadium is estimated to be ~$80 million, including $55 million for its construction.

The stadium is set to break ground on December 12, 2026.

== See also ==
- Sports teams in Florida
- List of soccer clubs in the United States
