= Cascades FC (USL) =

Soccer club in the U.S. state of Oregon

- Full name: Cascades Football Club
- Founded: April 18, 2024; 2 years ago
- Ground: Civic Park
- Capacity: 3,500
- Owner: Bill Cornog
- President: Dave Galas
- Head coach: Darren Sawatzky
- League: USL League One
- 2027: TBD
- Website: cascadesfc.com

Cascades Football Club is an upcoming professional soccer club based in Eugene, Oregon, United States. Founded in April 2024 to replace the pre-professional Lane United FC of USL League Two, the club is planning to make its USL League One debut in 2027.

== History ==
On April 18, 2024, USL League One announced that a franchise would be granted to Eugene, Oregon. The club was founded by the same group behind the pre-professional Lane United FC, who aimed to move towards the pro soccer world and leave behind the previous branding of Lane United, and the club was initially named Sporting Cascades FC. The team planned to play at Civic Park, at the former site of Civic Stadium which was rebuilt after a damaging fire in 2015, in Eugene for the 2025 USL League One season. The club's start date was later pushed back to the 2026 USL League One season, and then again to the 2027 season, in part due to announced head coach John Galas passing away from cancer. In May 2026, the club officially confirmed Civic Park as their home venue.

The first half of 2026 saw new life for the club in preparation for their inaugural season in 2027. An owner for the club was announced to be Bill Cornog, providing necessary funding for the club to afford to begin play. In June the club announced that outgoing Richmond Kickers coach, Darren Sawatzky will be the club's first head coach. The confirmation of Cascades FC beginning play was confirmed in a press release by the United Soccer League, which confirmed that Cascades FC will be a part of a group of four teams joining the USL League One in 2027.

In November 2026, the club rebranded, dropping the "Sporting" from the name and brown from the color scheme.

== Club identity and crest ==
Original logo of Sporting Cascades FC.

The club's Sporting Cascades FC branding was unveiled on August 22, 2025. The region identifier references the Cascades mountain range, the mountain range that spans from British Columbia to Northern California. In the crest, which is shaped like a shield, features the Three Sisters mountain peaks that are in Lane County, as well as the McKenzie and Willamette rivers. In November 2026, after consultations with supporters, the club announced that it would rebrand as Cascades Football Club ahead of the club's inaugural 2027 season, and revealed a redesigned and recolored crest.

== Stadium ==
Cascades FC will play their matches at Civic Park, a new soccer-specific stadium built on the footprint of the former Civic Stadium. Opened on May 1, 2025, at a cost of $30 million, the stadium features a main grandstand and a field house, with a phase two planned to add a scoreboard and a food court. The capacity of the stadium is around 3,500, and has a turf field.

== Players ==
=== Roster ===
As of November 17, 2026

Note: Flags indicate national team as defined under FIFA eligibility rules; some limited exceptions apply. Players may hold more than one non-FIFA nationality.

No.	Pos.	Nation	Player
—	DF	USA	Brecc Evans
—	DF	SOM	Mo Mohamed
—	DF	USA	Jonathan Robinson
—	MF	JPN	Gaku Nishimura
—	FW	FRA	Alexis Ledoux
—	FW	ITA	Fabian Straudi
—	FW	SEN	Mouhameth Thiam
