= Ninkasi Brewing Company =

Craft brewery in Oregon, U.S.

- Industry: Alcoholic beverage
- Founded: 2006
- Founder: Jamie Floyd
- Headquarters: Eugene, Oregon, U.S.
- Products: Beer
- Website: www.ninkasibrewing.com

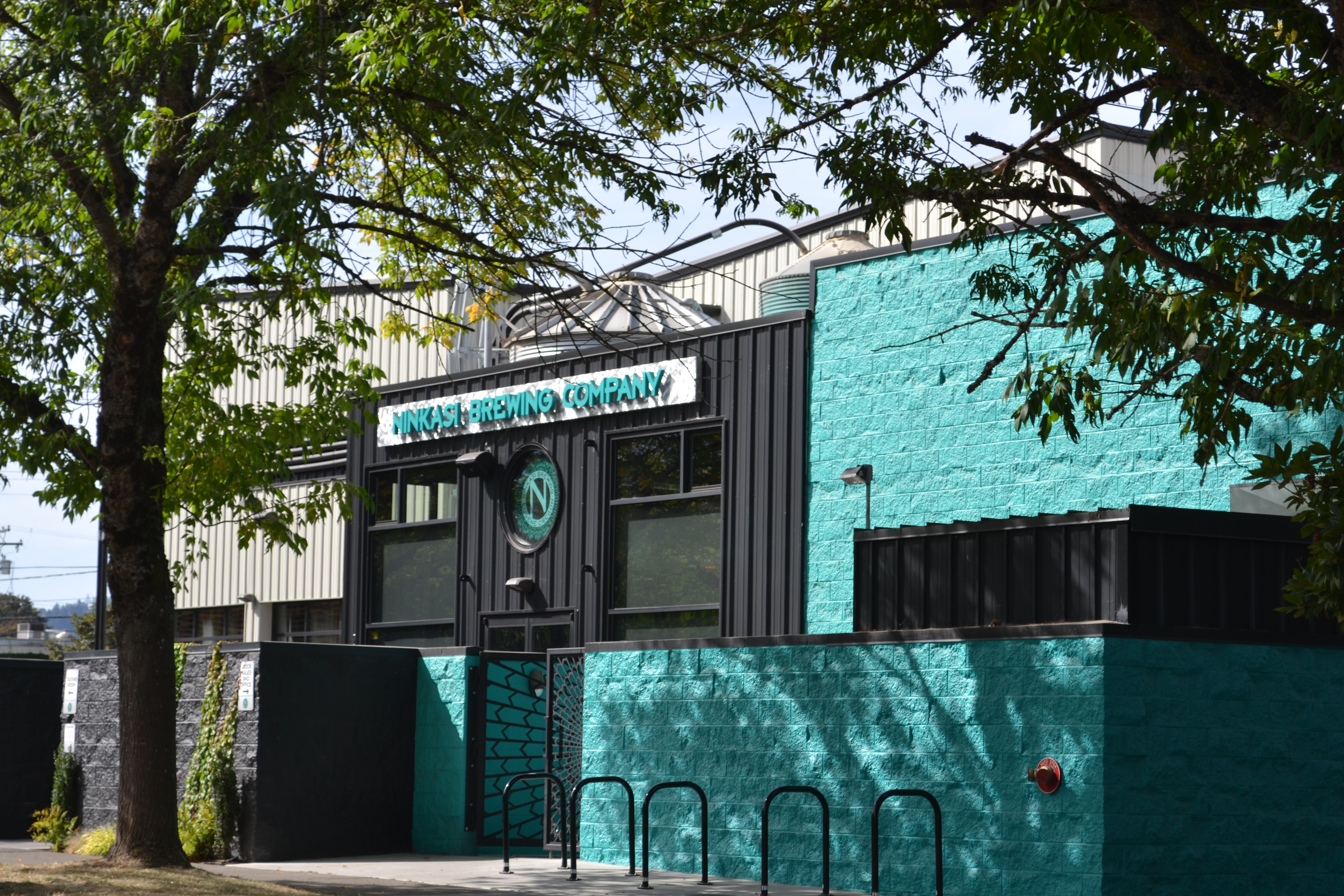
Ninkasi Brewing Company

Ninkasi Brewing Company is a microbrewery based in Eugene, Oregon, United States.

== History ==
Named after the Sumerian goddess of beer, Ninkasi was founded in 2006 by Jamie Floyd and Nikos Ridge. The first beer they produced was Total Domination IPA. Production reached 56,000 barrels in 2011 and by 2013 production had increased to 86,000.

The company's headquarters are in Eugene's Whiteaker neighborhood, which is also home to several other local breweries.

In 2020, Ninkasi opened the Ninkasi Better Living Room restaurant, which operated until its closure in October 2023.

Ninkasi merged with Legacy Breweries in April 2019, but dissolved the partnership a year later through a separation agreement. In 2023, the company merged with Wings & Arrow to form Great Frontier Holdings.

In September 2026, Buoy Beer Company of Astoria, Oregon, announced that it would merge with Great Frontier Holdings.

== Products ==
Beer varieties include Tricerahops Double IPA, Dawn of the Red IPA, Believer Double Red, and Oatis Oatmeal Stout. Their beers are available in Alaska, Alberta, British Columbia, Arizona, California, Colorado, Idaho, Nevada, Oregon, Utah, Washington, and Virginia. In 2010, Ninkasi produced over 32,000 barrels of beer.

- Dawn of the Red: Red IPA
- Far North x Northwest: Wheat Beer Made in Collaboration with 49th State Brewing Co
- Hazy Domination: Hazy IPA
- Oatis: Oatmeal Stout
- Prismatic: Juicy IPA
- Total Domination IPA: Northwest IPA
- Tricerahops Double IPA: Double IPA
- Ninkasi Gold Premium Lager

== See also ==
- Brewing in Oregon
- List of microbreweries
