= PK Park =

Baseball stadium

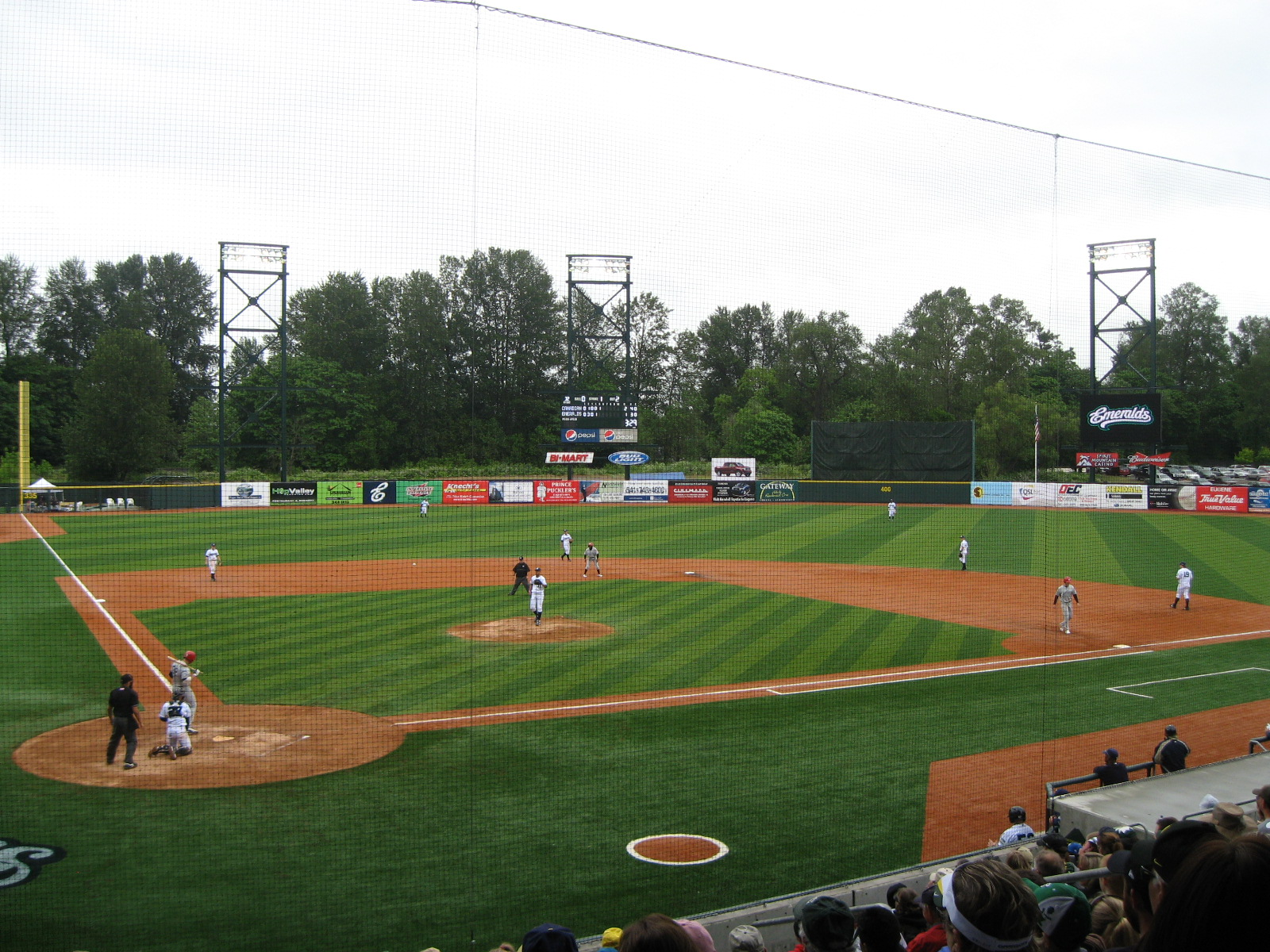
- PK Park in June 2010

- Location within Oregon Location within the United States
- Address: 2760 M.L. King Jr. Blvd.
- Location: Eugene, Oregon, U.S.
- Coordinates: 44.059°N 123.066°W
- Owner: University of Oregon
- Operator: University of Oregon
- Capacity: 4,000
- Surface: FieldTurf
- Record attendance: 5,097 (July 4, 2017)
- Field size: Left – 335 ft (102 m); Center – 400 ft (122 m); Right – 325 ft (99 m)

Construction
- Groundbreaking: August 15, 2008
- Opened: February 27, 2009 (temporary seating); March 2, 2010; 16 years ago
- Cost: $19.2 million ($28.8 million in 2025)
- Architect: DLR Group
- Structural engineer: KPFF Consulting Engineers
- General contractor: Lease Crutcher Lewis

Tenants
- Oregon Ducks (NCAA) (2009–present); Eugene Emeralds (NwL) (2010–present)

PK Park is a baseball stadium in the northwest United States, located in Eugene, Oregon. It is the home field of the University of Oregon Ducks of the Big Ten Conference and the MiLB Eugene Emeralds of the Northwest League. The Ducks' program was revived in 2009 after nearly three decades as a club sport.

PK Park is named after former Oregon athletic director Pat Kilkenny, whose donations helped to fund the stadium. Designed by sport architect DLR Group, PK Park has 3,000 fixed seats in the main seating bowl and a total capacity of 4,000 spectators. Fan amenities include a video board, landscaped areas for hospitality, a tiered party plaza called "Fowl Territory", a picnic plaza, and eight upper level suites. Located just east of Autzen Stadium, the baseball park was built on the northeast section of the football stadium's parking lot.

The Ducks' home field through 1981 was Howe Field, just south of McArthur Court. The on-campus venue has since been converted to Jane Sanders Stadium, the home of women's softball.

The elevation of the FieldTurf playing field at PK Park is approximately 420 feet (130 m) above sea level. It has an unorthodox alignment, oriented southeast by east (home plate to center field); the recommended alignment of a baseball diamond is east-northeast. The former home venues of Howe Field and Civic Stadium were similar, both aligned southeast.

== First seasons ==
Ground was broken for the facility on August 15, 2008, and the first phase involved construction of the FieldTurf playing field and temporary seating for the 2009 season. In their first game at PK Park on February 27, 2009, the Ducks beat Fresno State, the defending national champions, 1–0 on a walk-off single by senior Andrew Schmidt, witnessed by a sellout crowd of 2,777.

The second phase of the project was the permanent concrete grandstand, built between the 2009 and 2010 seasons. The first game in the completed stadium was on March 2, 2010, a 6–2 win over the Washington Huskies, with 2,609 in attendance.

== NCAA tournament ==
In 2012, the park hosted an NCAA Regional and Super Regional. Oregon won the Regional, but was defeated by Kent State in three games in the Super Regional.

In 2013, PK Park again hosted an NCAA Regional, as the Ducks entered the 64-team tournament as a #8 national seed. Oregon lost its second and fifth games, both to the Rice Owls, and were eliminated.

In 2021, PK Park hosted another regional, as the Ducks entered as the #14 national seed. Oregon fell short when they lost to LSU in the regional championship.

== Attendance ==
In 2013, the Ducks ranked 34th among Division I baseball programs in attendance, averaging 1,971 per home game.

The park hosted an Oregon Ducks baseball single-game record crowd of 4,825 on June 11, 2012, in game three of the Super Regional against Kent State; the Golden Flashes defeated the Ducks 3-2. To increase the stadium's capacity for postseason play, two temporary stands were erected beyond the left-center field wall.

The overall attendance record was set in 2017 when 5,097 fans attended a July 4 contest between the Eugene Emeralds and Boise Hawks. The game went on for 20 innings - the longest ever for any professional baseball game to be played on the July 4th Independence Day holiday.

Rank	Attendance	Opponent	Date	Notes
1	4,825	Kent State	June 11, 2012	NCAA Super Regional
2	4,177	Kent State	June 9, 2012	NCAA Super Regional
3	3,892	California*	April 28, 2012	post-Spring football game
3	3,892	Stanford*	April 27, 2013	post-Spring football game
3	3,892	Oregon State	May 18, 2013	Civil War rivalry
6	3,843	Kent State	June 10, 2012	NCAA Super Regional
7	3,820	Oregon State	May 17, 2013	Civil War rivalry
8	3,791	Washington State*	May 1, 2010	post-Spring football game
9	3,771	Austin Peay	June 1, 2012	NCAA Regional
10	3,762	Oregon State	May 19, 2013	Civil War rivalry

* Spring Football game played on the same day (no home baseball game after 2011 spring game).

== Previous venue ==
In the program's first period as a varsity sport (1936–1981), the Ducks played at Howe Field, which was converted to the women's softball venue in 1987 after the school eliminated baseball as a varsity sport in 1981. The minor league Eugene Emeralds had played at Civic Stadium from 1969 through 2009, and previously at Bethel Park, located at Roosevelt Boulevard and Maple Street (44.0644°N 123.1454°W); its outfield is now Lark City Park.

== See also ==
- List of NCAA Division I baseball venues
