= Darren Sawatzky =

American soccer player and coach

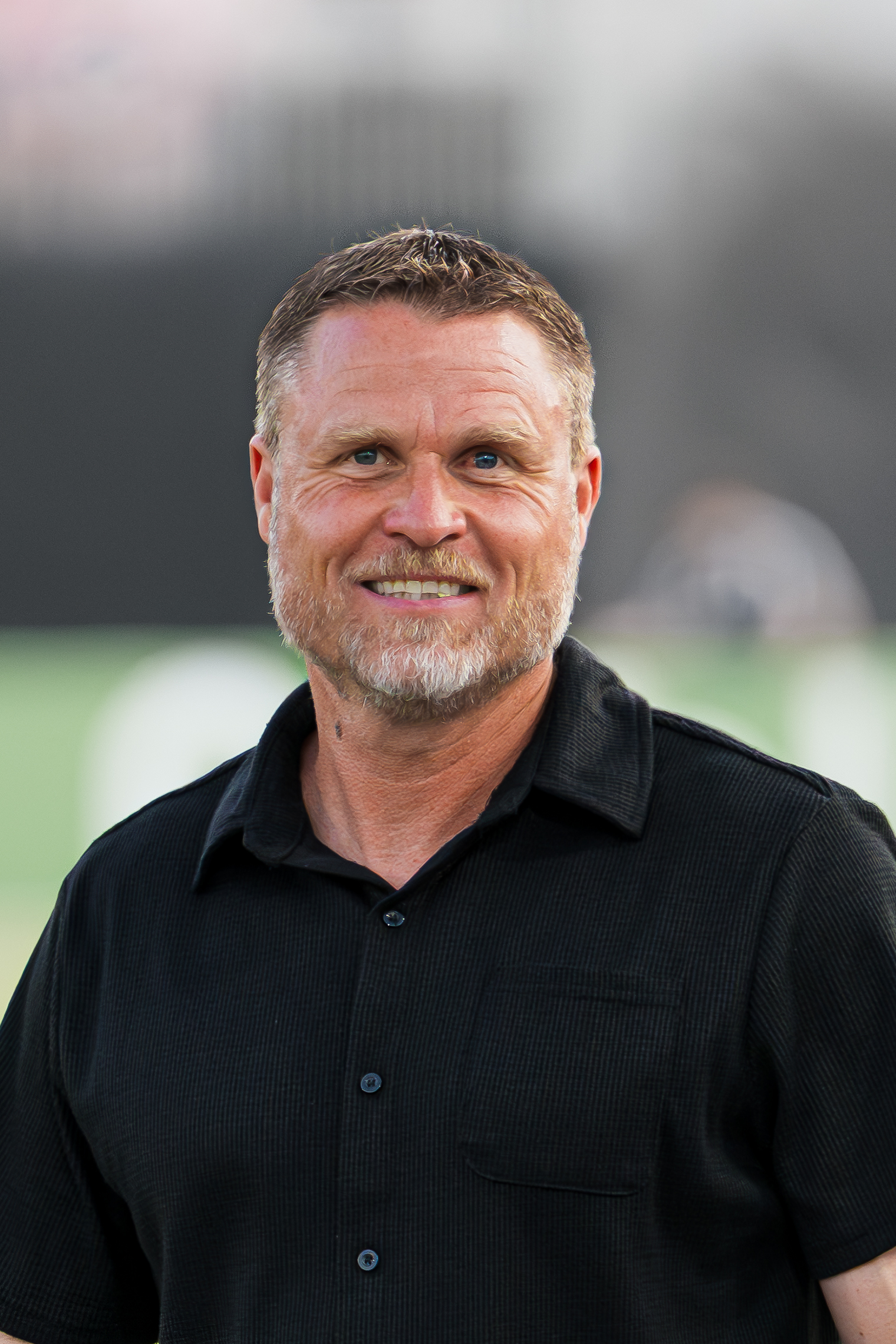
- Sawatzky with the Richmond Kickers in 2026

Personal information
- Date of birth: February 22, 1973 (age 53)
- Place of birth: Seattle, Washington, United States
- Height: 5 ft 10 in (1.78 m)
- Positions: Forward; midfielder

Team information
- Current team: Sporting Cascades FC (head coach)

College career
Years	Team	Apps	(Gls)
1991–1994	Portland Pilots		

Senior career*
Years	Team	Apps	(Gls)
1995	Oregon Surge	?	(18)
1996–1997	New England Revolution	24	(5)
1997	→ Worcester Wildfire (loan)	2	(1)
1997	→ Connecticut Wolves (loan)	2	(0)
1998	Dallas Burn	1	(0)
1998	→ New Orleans Storm (loan)	1	(0)
1998	→ Hershey Wildcats (loan)	5	(4)
1998	Charleston Battery	19	(4)
1999	Colorado Rapids	14	(1)
1999	→ MLS Pro 40 (loan)	14	(3)
2000	Seattle Sounders	28	(16)
2001	Portland Timbers	22	(5)
2001–2002	Kansas City Comets (indoor)	14	(2)
2002–2004	Seattle Sounders	67	(22)

Managerial career
- 2001: Central Catholic High School (assistant)
- 2002–2006: Jefferson High School
- 2004–2006: Washington Huskies (assistant)
- 2007–2008: Seattle Sounders (assistant)
- 2012–2018: Seattle Sounders FC U-23
- 2015–2018: Tacoma Stars
- 2016–2017: Guam
- 2018–2019: FC Tucson
- 2019–2026: Richmond Kickers
- 2027–: Sporting Cascades FC
- * Club domestic league appearances and goals

Darren Sawatzky (born February 22, 1973) is an American soccer coach and former player who is currently the head coach of Sporting Cascades FC, an upcoming expansion club in USL League One.

He spent four seasons in Major League Soccer, one season in the Major Indoor Soccer League, one in USISL and five in the United Soccer Leagues.

He currently holds several coaching positions at the high school, collegiate and professional levels and was the Director of Youth Development for Seattle Sounders FC of Major League Soccer. In January 2015, he was named head coach of the Tacoma Stars of the Major Arena Soccer League.

== Player ==
=== High school and college ===
Sawatzky grew up in the Seattle area, playing for the Highline club as a youth. He attended Thomas Jefferson High School in Federal Way, Washington. After graduating from high school, Sawatzky entered the University of Portland. He played for the University of Portland Pilots soccer team from 1991 to 1994, finishing his career tenth on the career scoring list. He graduated from Portland with a bachelor's degree in organizational communication.

=== Professional ===
In 1995, Sawatzky signed with the expansion Oregon Surge in USISL. He also had trials with Mexican clubs UNAM Pumas and Leon in 1995, but did not earn a contract with either team. In 1996, he went on trial with Leicester City, but was not signed. In February 1996, the New England Revolution of Major League Soccer (MLS) selected Sawatzky in the eighth round (75th overall) in the Inaugural MLS Draft. He played nineteen games, scoring four goals that season. In 1997, his playing time dropped to five games as the Revolution loaned him to both the Connecticut Wolves and Worcester Wildfire of the USISL A-League. The Revolution released Sawatzky on November 10, 1997. In 1998, the Dallas Burn of MLS selected Sawatzky in the third round (thirty-fourth overall) of the 1998 Supplemental Draft. However, he played only a total of three minutes for the Burn as they loaned him out first to the New Orleans Storm then the Hershey Wildcats before releasing him. Sawatzky then signed with the Charleston Battery, playing nineteen games in the 1998 season. In 1999, the Colorado Rapids of MLS took Sawatzky in the first round (eighth overall) of the 1999 Supplemental Draft. He played fourteen games for the Rapids in 1999, then was waived on November 24, 1999. In April 2000, the Seattle Sounders of the United Soccer Leagues (USL). He tied for third in the league with sixteen goals, earning first team All Star recognition. In 2001, he played a single season with the expansion Portland Timbers. On December 20, 2001, the Timbers released Sawatzky. He then moved to the Kansas City Comets of Major Indoor Soccer League. In February 2002, he rejoined the Sounders as a free agent. He saw declining minutes with the Sounders over the next two seasons and on July 23, 2004, he announced his intentions to retire at the end of the season to devote himself full-time to coaching.

== Coach ==
Sawatzky began coaching in 1991 with the Tualatin Hills Soccer Club. Over the years, he continued to coach with various youth clubs as his playing career allowed. In 2001, he became an assistant coach with Central Catholic High School in Portland, Oregon, while playing with the Timbers. When he moved to Seattle in 2002, he became the head coach at his alma mater, Jefferson High School. In 2005, he took Jefferson to the 4A Washington State Championship. In 2004, he became an assistant coach with the University of Washington. On February 21, 2007, Sawatzky joined the Seattle Sounders as an assistant coach. He also serves as the Director of Coaching for HPFC, a youth club in Washington State. He coached and helped almost every team for the HPFC boys and girls club teams, including HPFC Boys 94 blue and HPFC Girls 95 Blue.

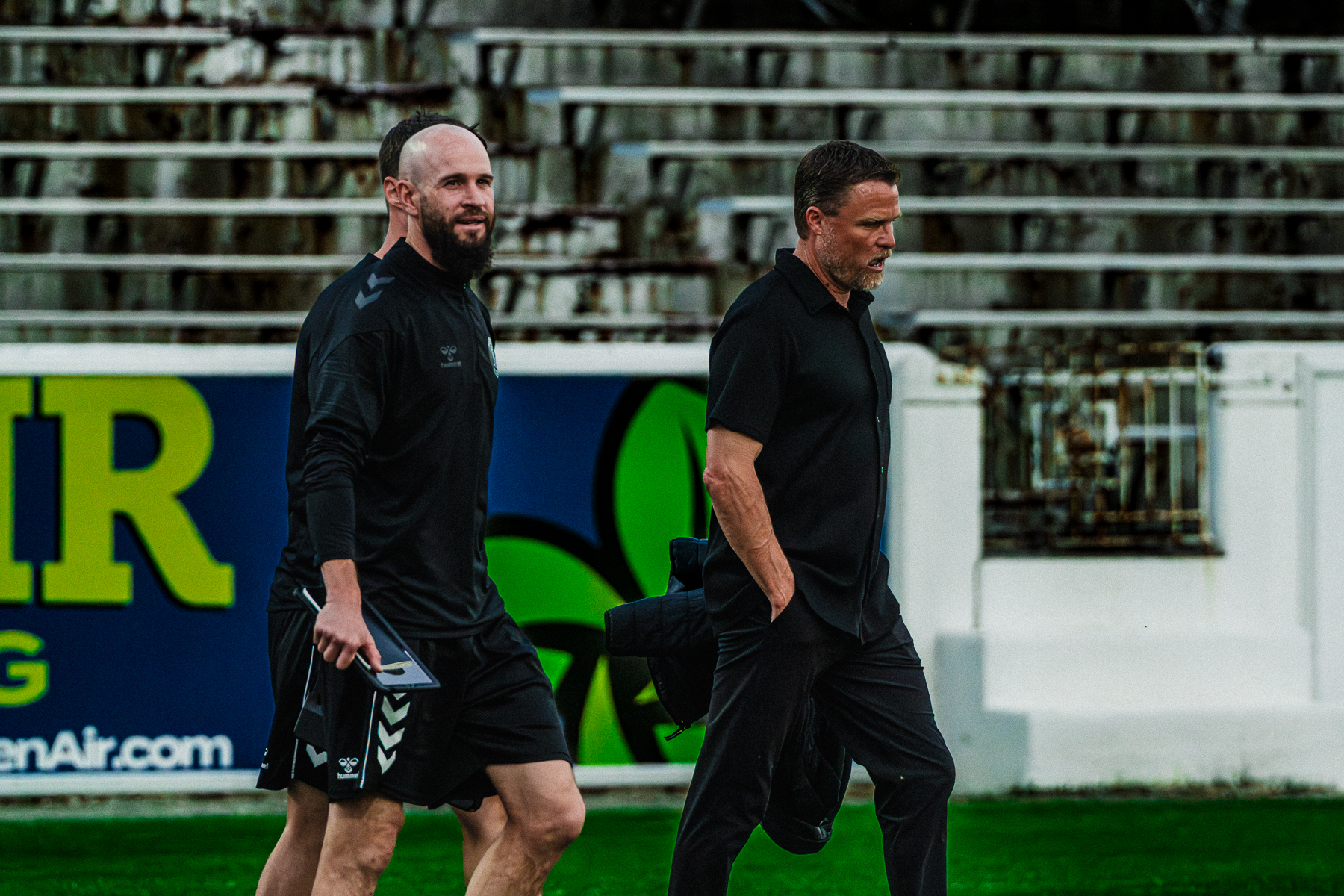
Sawatzky with assistant coach, Brian Ownby in the U.S. Open Cup match against Loudoun United

Since 2015, Sawatzky has coached the indoor Tacoma Stars.

On August 31, 2016, Sawatzky was hired as the interim head coach of the Guam national football team.

On December 12, 2018, Sawatzky was named the head coach of FC Tucson in USL League One.

On November 6, 2019, he was named the head coach and sporting director of the Richmond Kickers.

On 15 June 2026, he announced that he had parted ways with the Kickers after nearly seven seasons as head coach, and he will be appointed as head coach of USL League One expansion club Sporting Cascades FC after the club triggered his buyout clause from his contract at Richmond.
