= Whiteaker, Eugene, Oregon =

Neighborhood in Eugene, Oregon, United States

Coordinates: 44.058356°N 123.105326°W

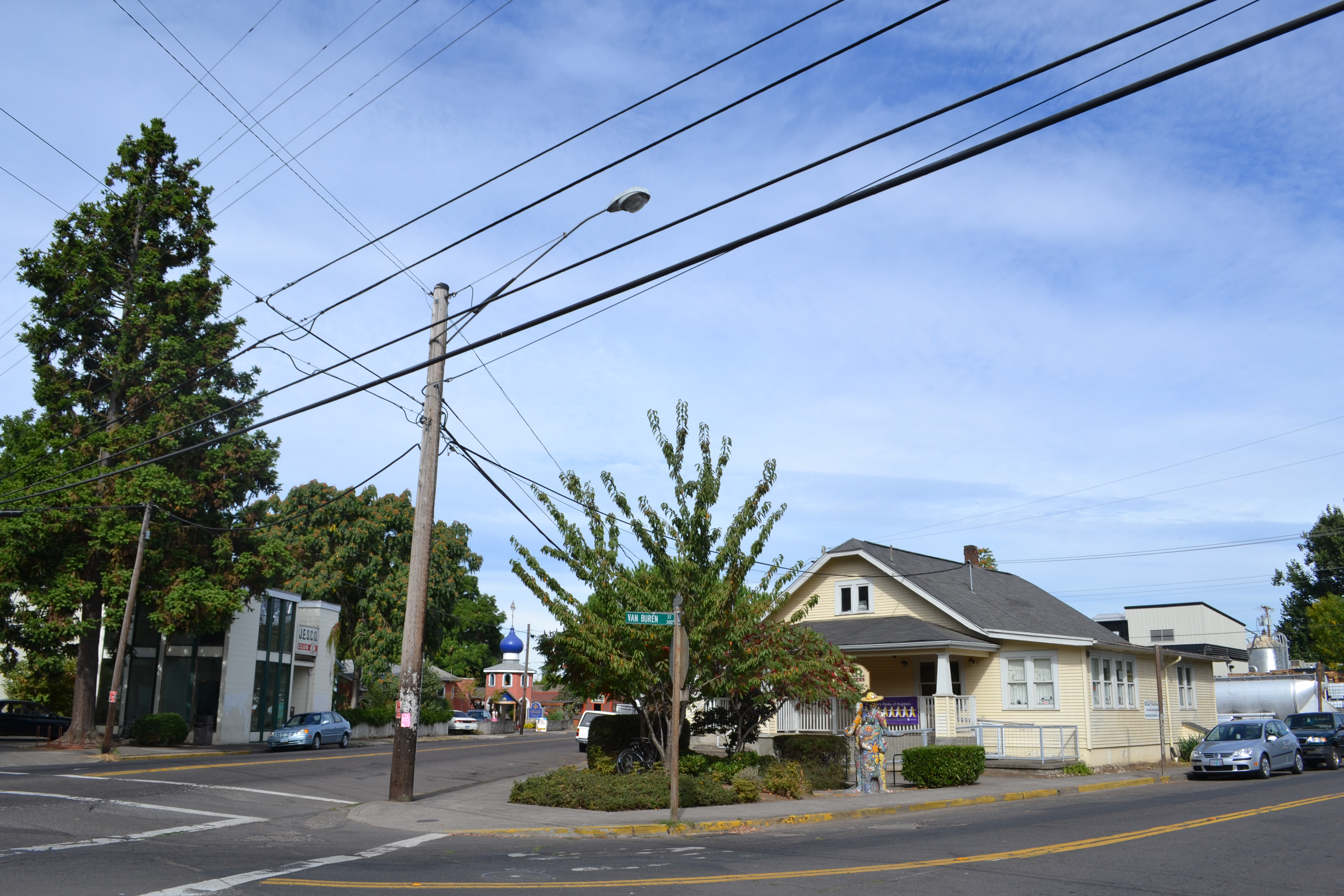
Whiteaker Neighborhood (Eugene, Oregon)

Whiteaker is a neighborhood in Eugene, Oregon, United States. It is located to the northwest of downtown Eugene, and is home to primarily working class residents. Though it has served as an agricultural and commercial district in the past, it has become a primarily residential area. It is known as a vibrant cultural hub, center of community and environmental activism, and home to alternative artists; it is increasingly also a nightlife district with many popular bars and restaurants.

== History ==
Whiteaker is named after Oregon's first governor, John Whiteaker, who purchased ten blocks there in 1890. A school in the neighborhood named after the governor lent its name to the neighborhood. Whiteaker is located northwest of downtown Eugene, along the Willamette River.

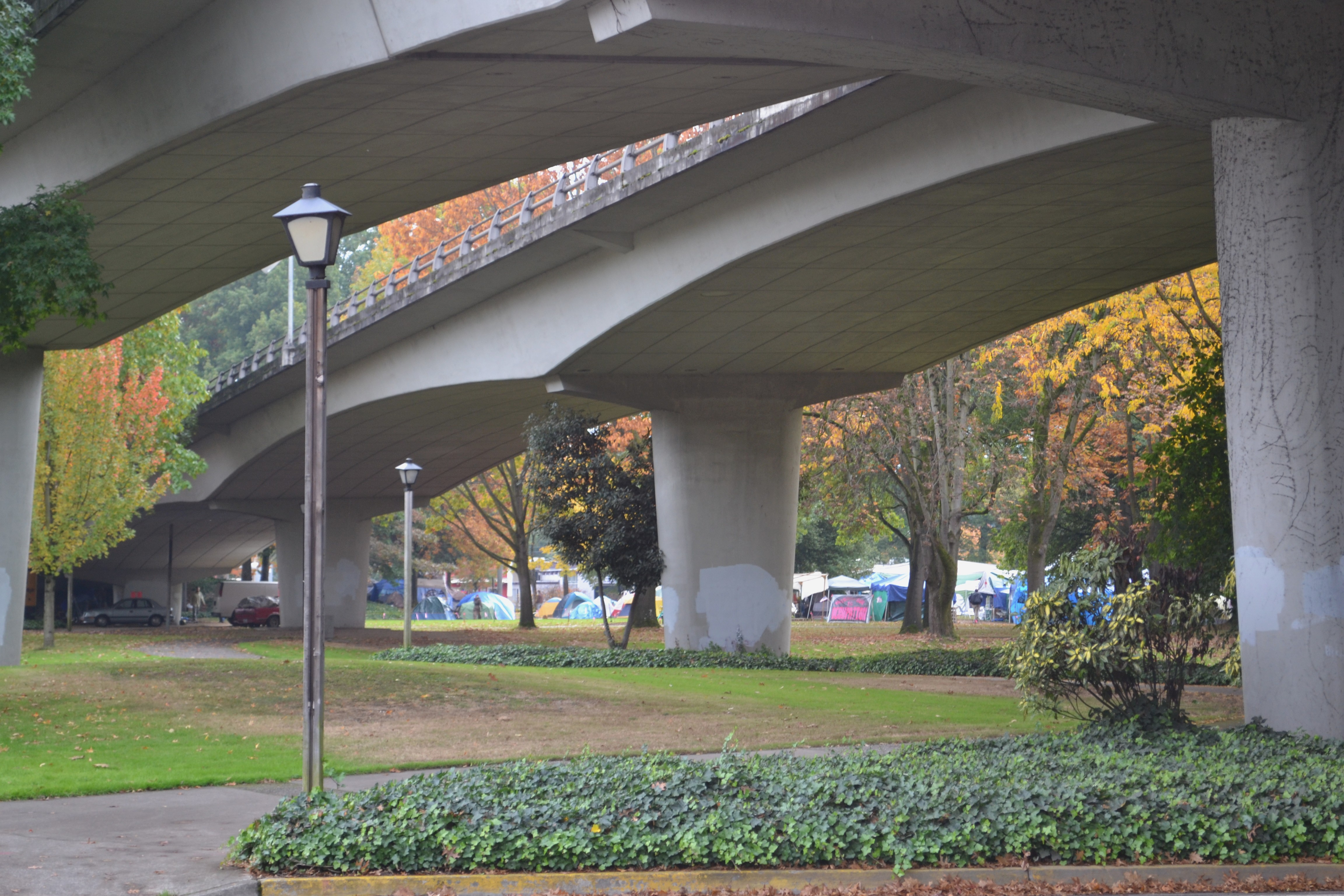
Washington Jefferson Park

U.S. Route 99 passed through Whiteaker until the 1930s, leading to the creation of a thriving commercial district in the neighborhood. Agriculture was a key part of Whiteaker's economy from the 1930s to the 1950s. Cows and other livestock were raised there by some residents. In the 1960s, the area became a popular destination for young counterculture individuals from outside the region. This migration led to the creation of several small businesses in Whiteaker, as well as increased drug use.

The 1970s saw an increase in community activism. Local activists stopped a proposed freeway and lobbied for the construction of the Washington Jefferson Park beneath the Washington-Jefferson Street Bridge. The Whiteaker Community Council soon formed as a result of these efforts.

In the early 1980s, Whiteaker saw an increase in the construction of apartment buildings and the destruction of single-family homes. There was also a swell in the area's homeless population. At the same time, the number of arrests for drug offenses and violent crimes increased. This caused the neighborhood to be perceived as a high-crime area by other residents of Eugene.

The Washington-Jefferson Street Bridge and the Chambers Connector pass through the neighborhood; as of 1990, they carried almost 100,000 cars a day.

== Demographics ==
In 1990, The Register-Guard reported that the Whiteaker neighborhood had 5,050 residents. The paper also reported that the neighborhood was 90% white, 7% Hispanic, and 3% black. As of 2000, the population of Whiteaker was 6,000. The neighborhood was roughly 80% white.

In the 1990s, the neighborhood saw an influx of young people from around the United States, drawn by its political climate. In the early to mid-1990s, there was also an influx of Hispanic families to the neighborhood. Whiteaker is served by the Eugene School District, which reported that 30% of its students spoke Spanish in 1995. Although the demographics have changed, the neighborhood has remained primarily working class.

In 2022, the Whiteaker Community Council verified with the City of Eugene that the Whiteaker neighborhood (known as The Whit) is composed of 2606 residential homes, 432 businesses, and has 11 parks.

== Politics ==
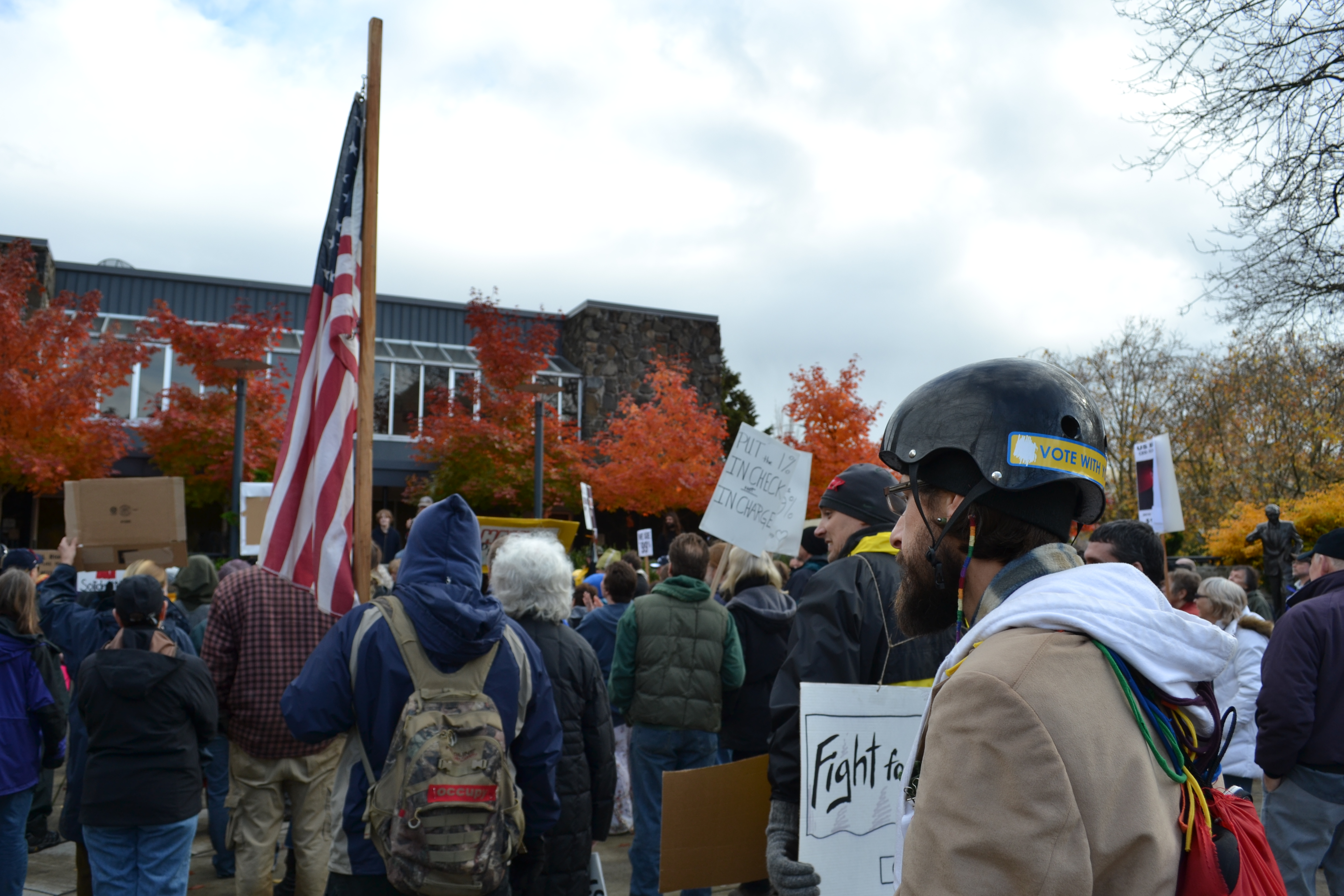
Occupy Eugene rally

The Whiteaker neighborhood is known for a large concentration of young, politically radical residents. In the late 1990s, local activists gained notoriety after organizing successful tree sitting demonstrations. In 1997, a tree-sitting demonstration in Eugene was responded to by local police with what was seen as overwhelming force, an event which further radicalized local activists but also helped shift public opinion in their favor. Local income inequality and lack of affordable housing have also been credited with the radicalization of activists.

In June 1999, a riot broke out in Whiteaker during an anti-globalization protest during which protesters vandalized and looted a Taco Bell and a 7-Eleven. After police responded with tear gas and pepper spray, protesters battled with police for several hours. Later that year, Whiteaker activists also played a key role in conjunction with other anarchists in organizing black bloc tactics during the World Trade Organization Ministerial Conference of 1999 protest activity. Eugene police subsequently claimed that local anarchists were responsible for other attacks on local police officers. Local activists in turn argued that in response, police needlessly harassed individuals wearing black clothing.

Animal rights groups also have a heavy presence in Whiteaker, and several vegan restaurants are located there. According to David Samuels, the Animal Liberation Front and the Earth Liberation Front have had an underground presence in the neighborhood. The neighborhood is home to several communal apartment buildings, which are often organized by anarchist or environmentalist groups. Local activists have also produced independent films and started art galleries, community gardens, and independent media outlets. Copwatch, Food Not Bombs, and Critical Mass are also active in the neighborhood.

In 2011, the Occupy Eugene protests relocated to Washington Jefferson Park in Whiteaker after initially forming at the downtown Eugene Park Blocks at 8th and Oak.

== Notable people ==
Well known residents of Whiteaker include the Green Anarchist writer John Zerzan and author Margaret Seltzer.

== Economy ==
Several structures along Blair Boulevard—one of the main streets through the neighborhood—and the surrounding area make up the Eugene Blair Boulevard Commercial Historic District.

Prominent local businesses include Sam Bond's Garage, a local tavern, the Ninkasi Brewing Company, Izakaya Meiji company, a Japanese tapas and whiskey bar, and the Whiteaker Community Market, a Sunday farmers and artists market.

The Orthodox Church of St John the Wonderworker has been in the neighborhood since 1997.

== Gallery ==
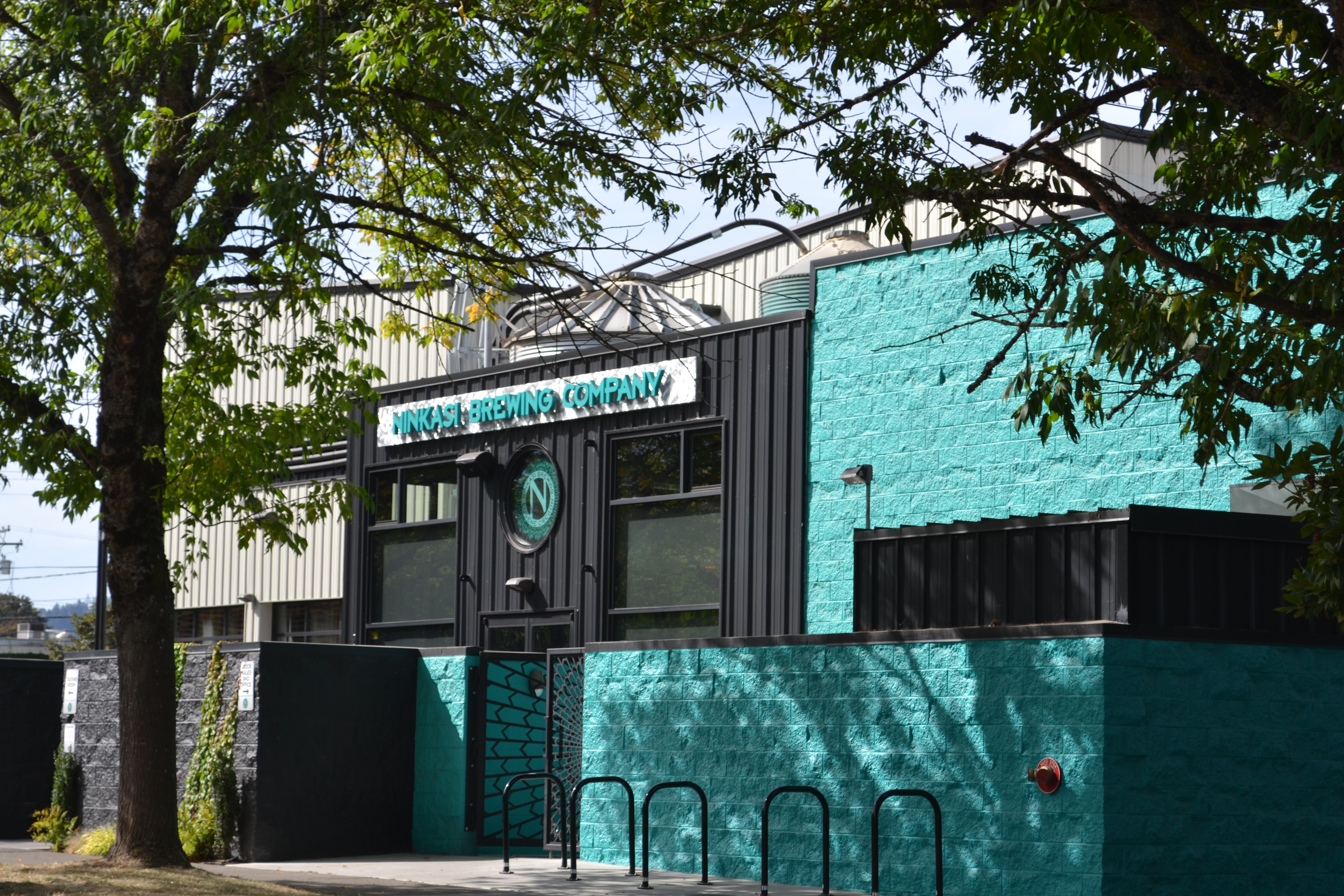
Ninkasi Brewing Company

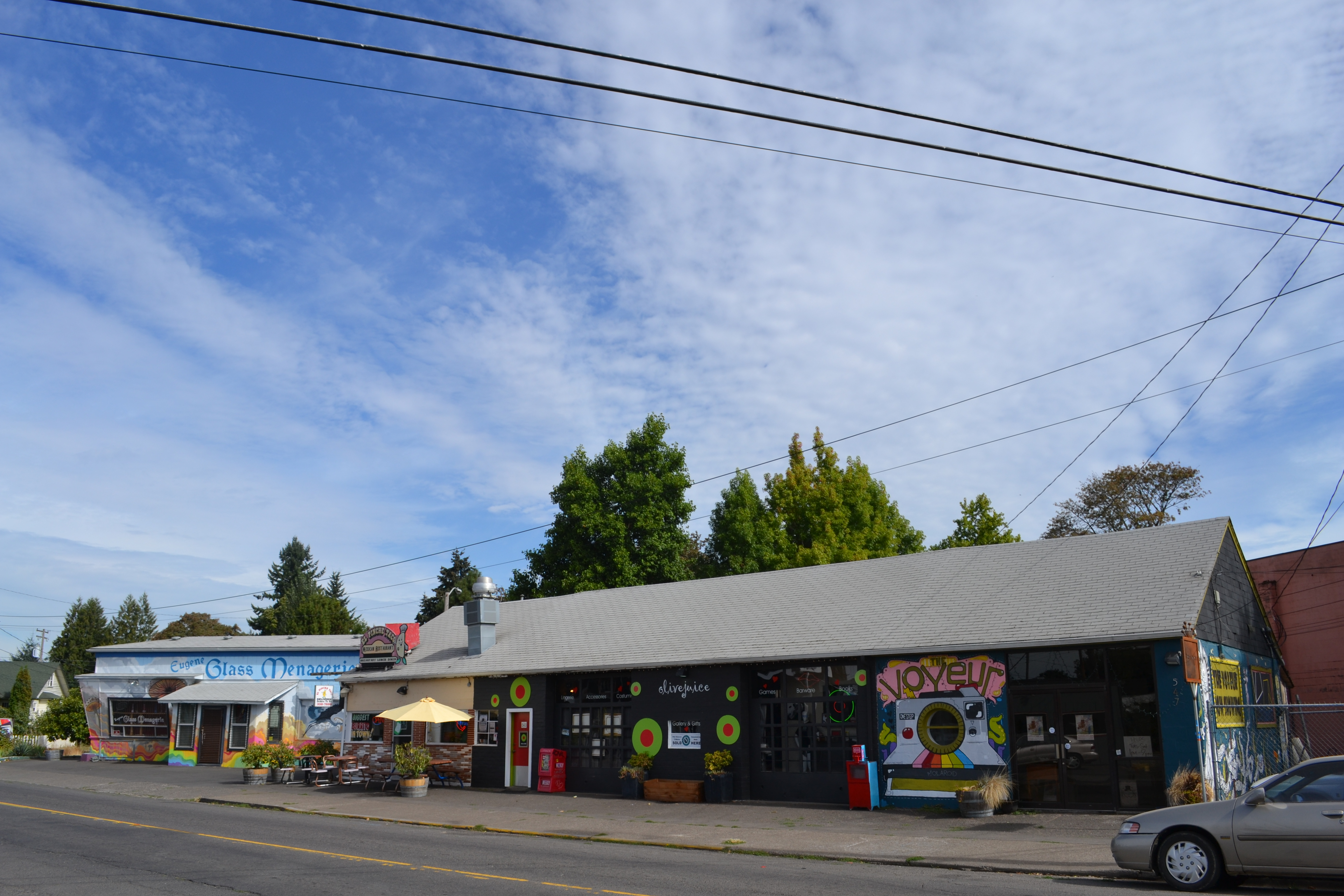
Storefronts

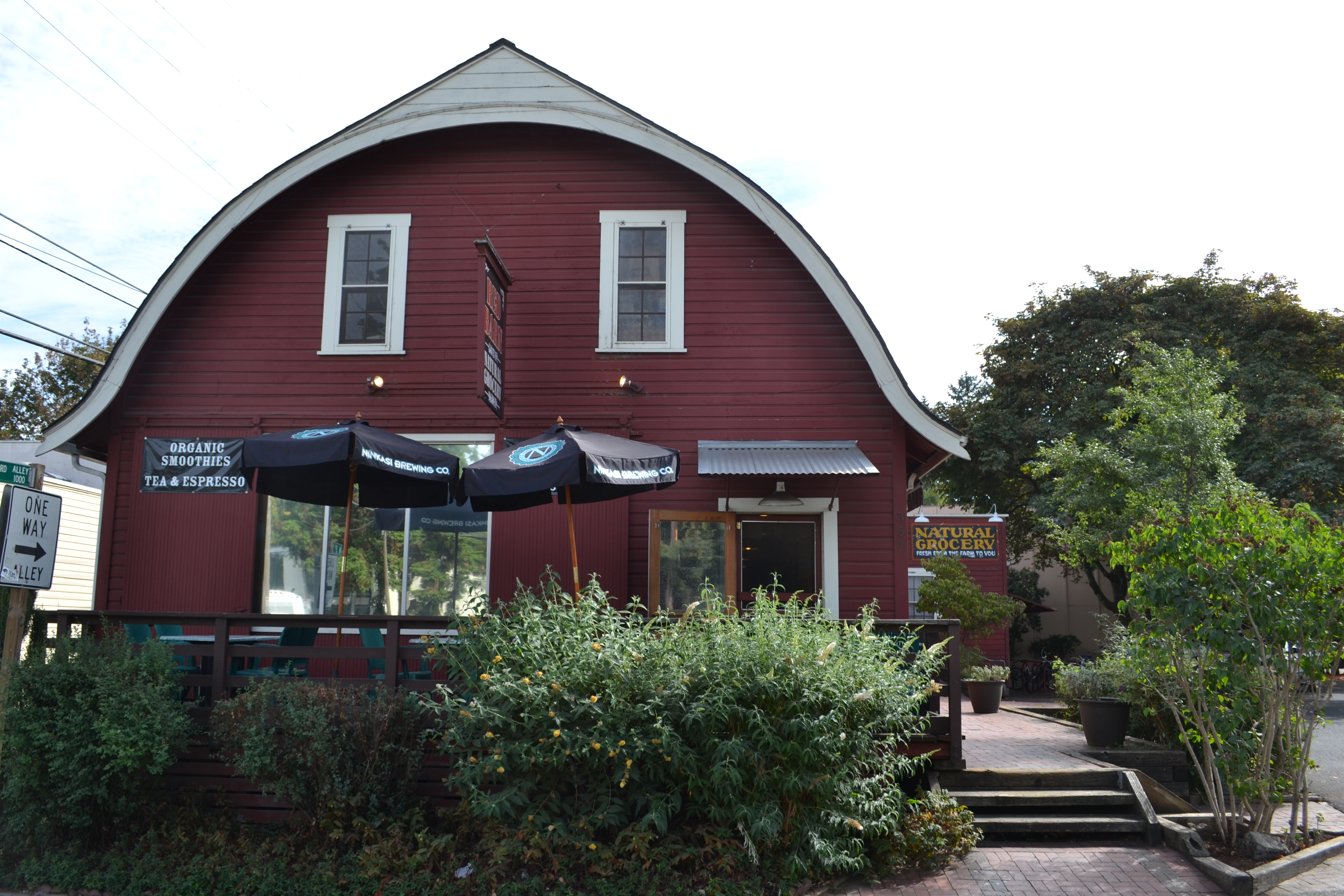
Red Barn Natural Grocery

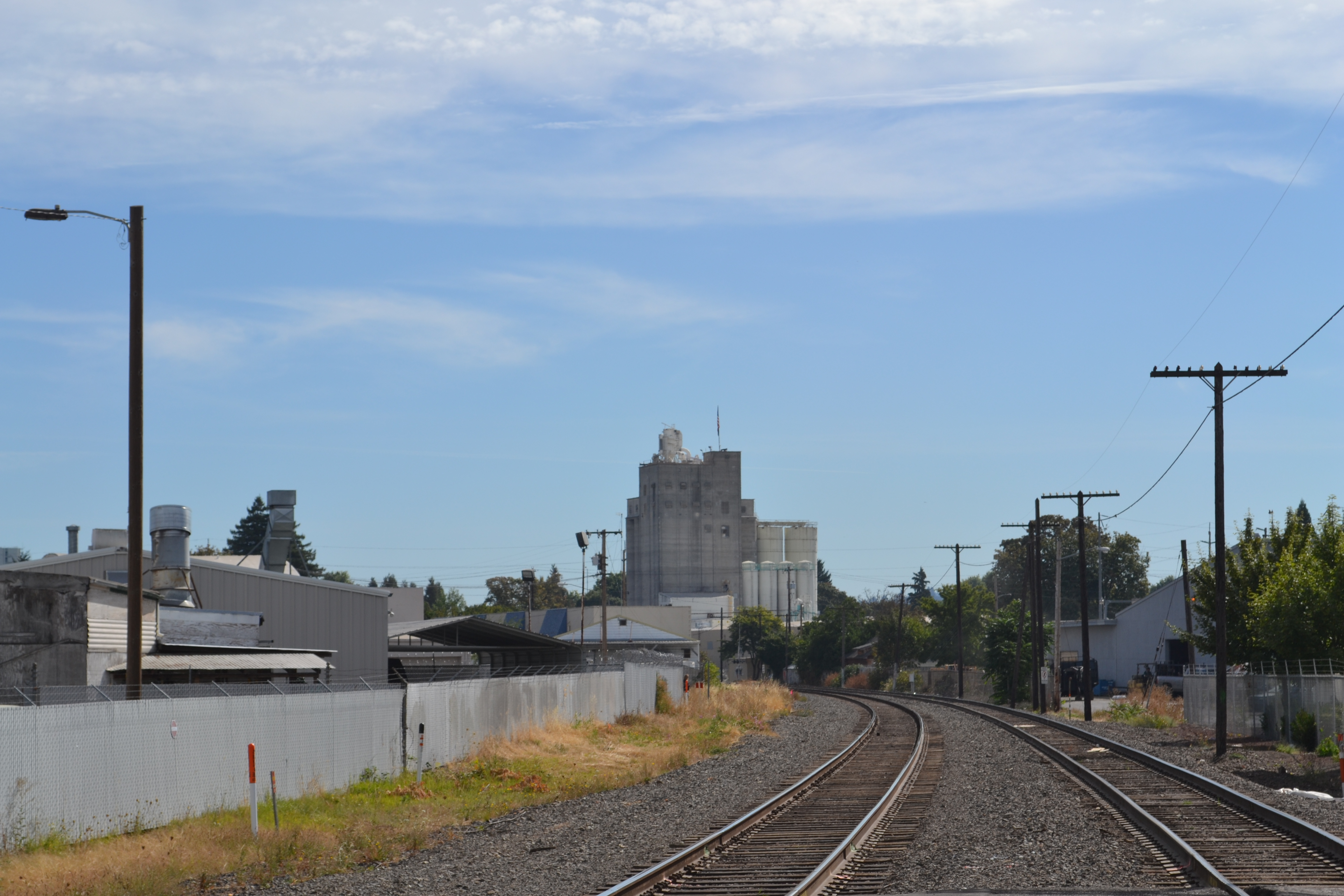
Railroad tracks
