= Civic Stadium (Eugene, Oregon) =

Outdoor athletic stadium

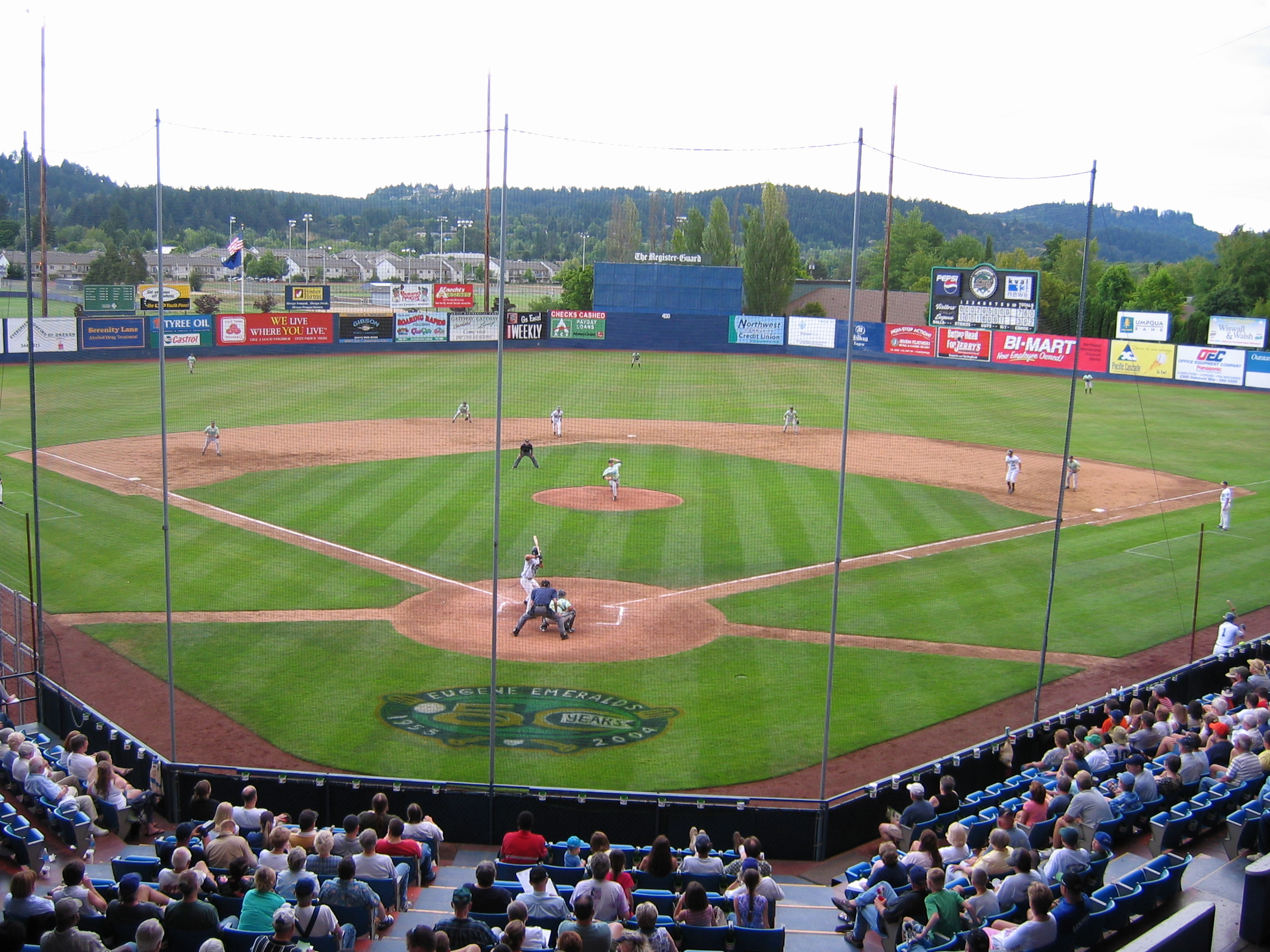
- Emeralds game in July 2004
- Interactive map of Civic Stadium
- Address: 2077 Willamette Street
- Location: Eugene, Oregon, U.S.
- Coordinates: 44.037°N 123.091°W
- Owner: Eugene School District (1938–2015); Eugene Civic Alliance (2015–present)
- Capacity: 6,800 (1938–2015); 3,500 (2024–present)
- Surface: Natural grass

Construction
- Opened: October 28, 1938; 87 years ago
- Renovated: 2020; 2024
- Closed: September 4, 2009
- Demolished: June 29, 2015 (fire)
- Cost: $18,000 ($411,702 in 2025)
- Builder: Works Progress Administration (WPA)

Tenants
- South Eugene High School; Eugene Emeralds; Pacific Coast League (AAA), 1969–1973; Northwest League (A), 1974–2009; Sporting Cascades FC (2026–present)
- Eugene Civic Stadium
- Formerly listed on the U.S. National Register of Historic Places
- Location: 2077 Willamette Street, Eugene, Oregon
- Built: 1938, 88 years ago
- Built by: Works Progress Administration
- Architect: Graham B. Smith
- NRHP reference No.: 08000183

Significant dates
- Added to NRHP: October 6, 2008
- Removed from NRHP: March 8, 2016

Civic Stadium was an outdoor athletic stadium in the Northwestern United States, located in Eugene, Oregon. For most of its history, it was owned by the Eugene School District. Opened in 1938, the stadium was destroyed by fire in 2015 on June 29.

The stadium was replaced by Civic Park, which was built in phases for $42 million. Completed in 2024, the facility features a soccer field, fieldhouse, locker rooms, and seating for 3,500 spectators.

== History ==
Civic Stadium, located south of East 20th Avenue and east of Willamette Street, adjacent to South Eugene High School, had a seating capacity of 6,800. Built in 1938 through a public-private partnership between the Eugene Area Chamber of Commerce, Eugene School District 4J, and the federal Works Progress Administration (WPA); the property had been owned by the school district from its construction until spring 2015. In October 2008, Civic Stadium was added to the National Register of Historic Places.

Originally built for high school football and baseball, in 1969 it became the home of the Eugene Emeralds minor league baseball team, which previously played at the privately owned Bethel Park, on the northwest corner of Roosevelt Boulevard and Maple Street (44.0644°N 123.1454°W). (Bethel Park's outfield is present-day Lark Park). The Emeralds moved up to the Pacific Coast League (AAA) in 1969 and needed a larger venue. After five seasons in the PCL, they returned to the Class A Northwest League in 1974 and played in the stadium through 2009. (High school football moved to the University of Oregon's Autzen Stadium in 1969, following the installation of artificial turf.) Before the departure of the Emeralds in 2009, Civic Stadium was one of the ten oldest active minor league baseball facilities in the United States.

The lighted playing field at Civic Stadium had an unorthodox alignment, oriented southeast (home plate to center field); the recommended alignment of a baseball diamond is east-northeast. The natural grass field was at an approximate elevation of 430 feet (130 m) above sea level.

== Emeralds relocate ==
In August 2009, the Emeralds announced their relocation to the University of Oregon's PK Park for the 2010 season. The Emeralds cited Civic Stadium's need for substantial renovations, major problems with irrigation and electrical systems, and broken seats, and estimated that modernization could cost as much as $15 million.

The Emeralds played their last game at Civic Stadium on Thursday, September 4, 2009, a 5–3 loss to the Salem-Keizer Volcanoes. Following the game, fans collected pieces of the outfield turf as souvenirs.

== Disuse and destruction ==
By 2009, the school district designated the stadium a surplus property, although they had not decided whether to sell it. As recently as 2007, the school district examined options to redevelop all or part of the property, most likely as medium-density residential units. A local group, Friends of Civic Stadium, started a grassroots campaign in support of restoring the historic venue while also attempting to find alternative tenants.

With the future of the stadium in flux, it was one of ten entries on Restore Oregon's Most Endangered Places in Oregon 2011 list.

In April 2015, the Eugene Civic Alliance raised $4.1 million to buy the stadium and 10 acres of surrounding property from the school district. Eugene Civic Alliance is a non-profit made up of community leaders, including Lane United FC managing director Dave Galas, and the executive director of the Eugene youth sports organization Kidsports, former Ducks basketball player Bev Smith.

On June 29, 2015, Civic Stadium was destroyed by fire. Two days later, officials charged four pre-teen boys in connection with the fire, although the cause had not yet been determined conclusively. It was delisted from the National Register of Historic Places on March 8, 2016.

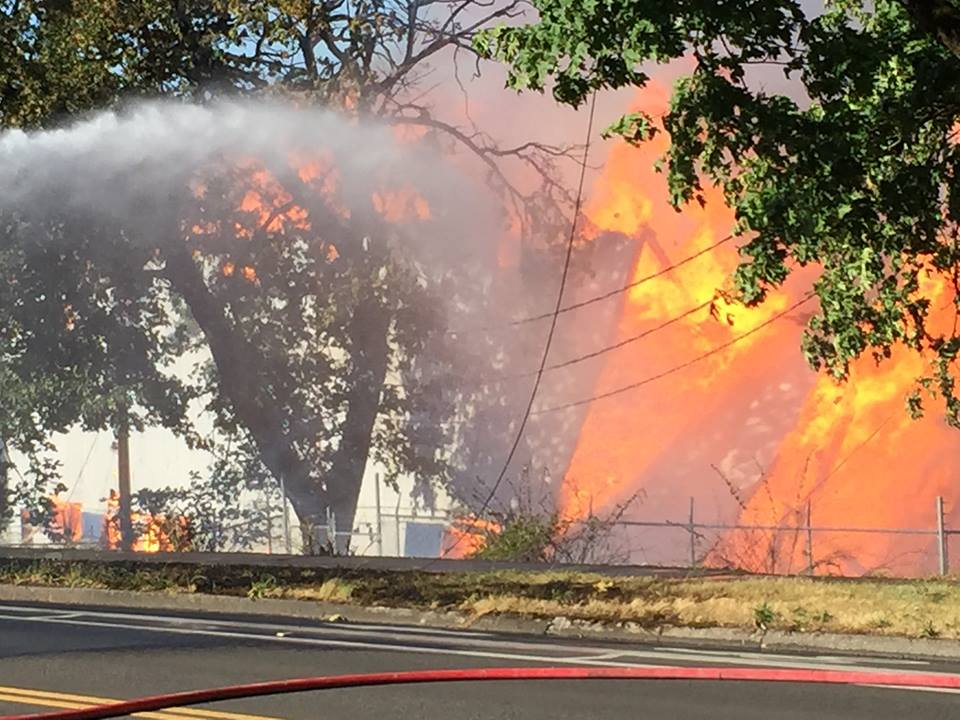
The stadium on fire

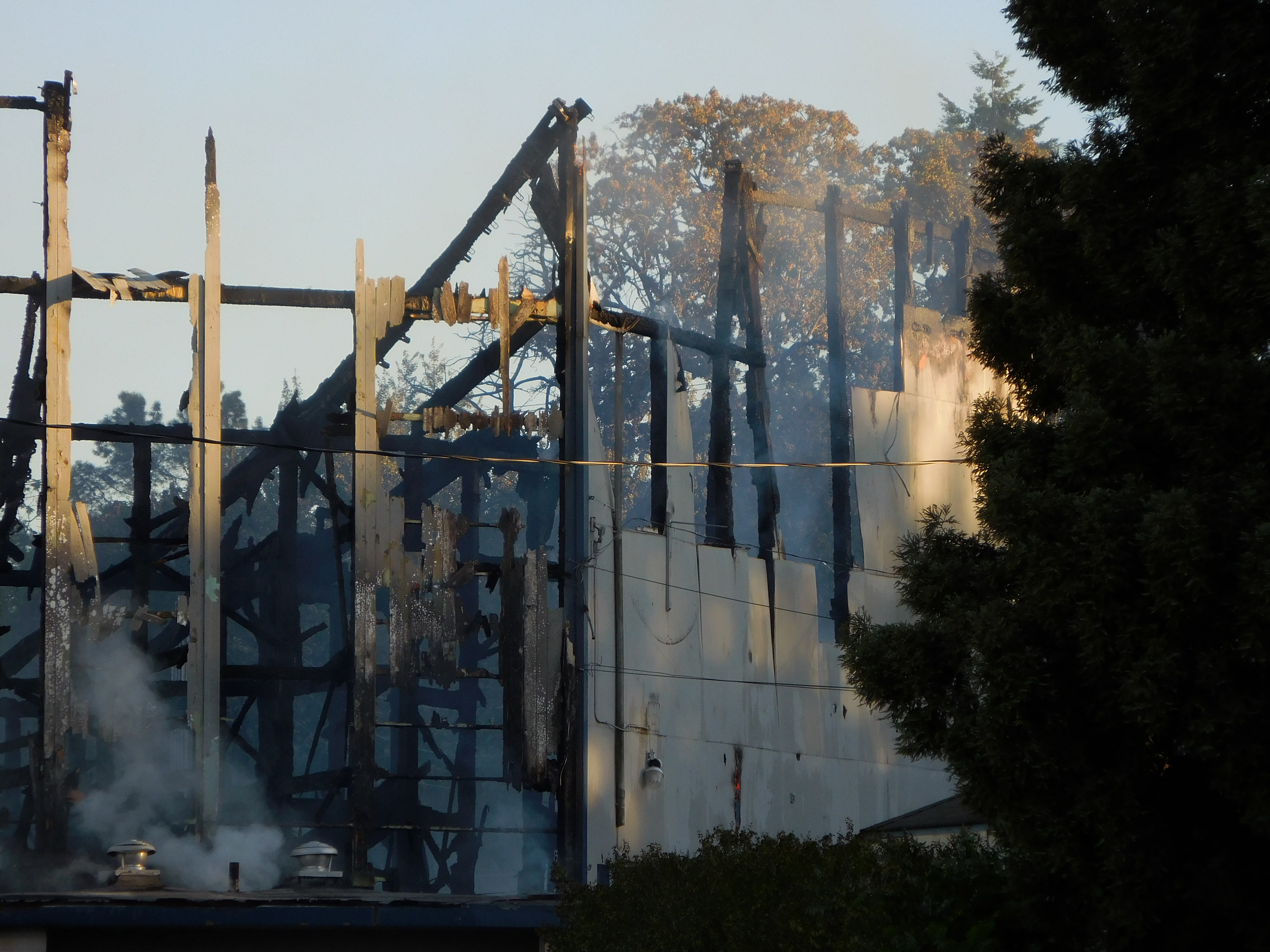
Grandstand, shortly after the fire

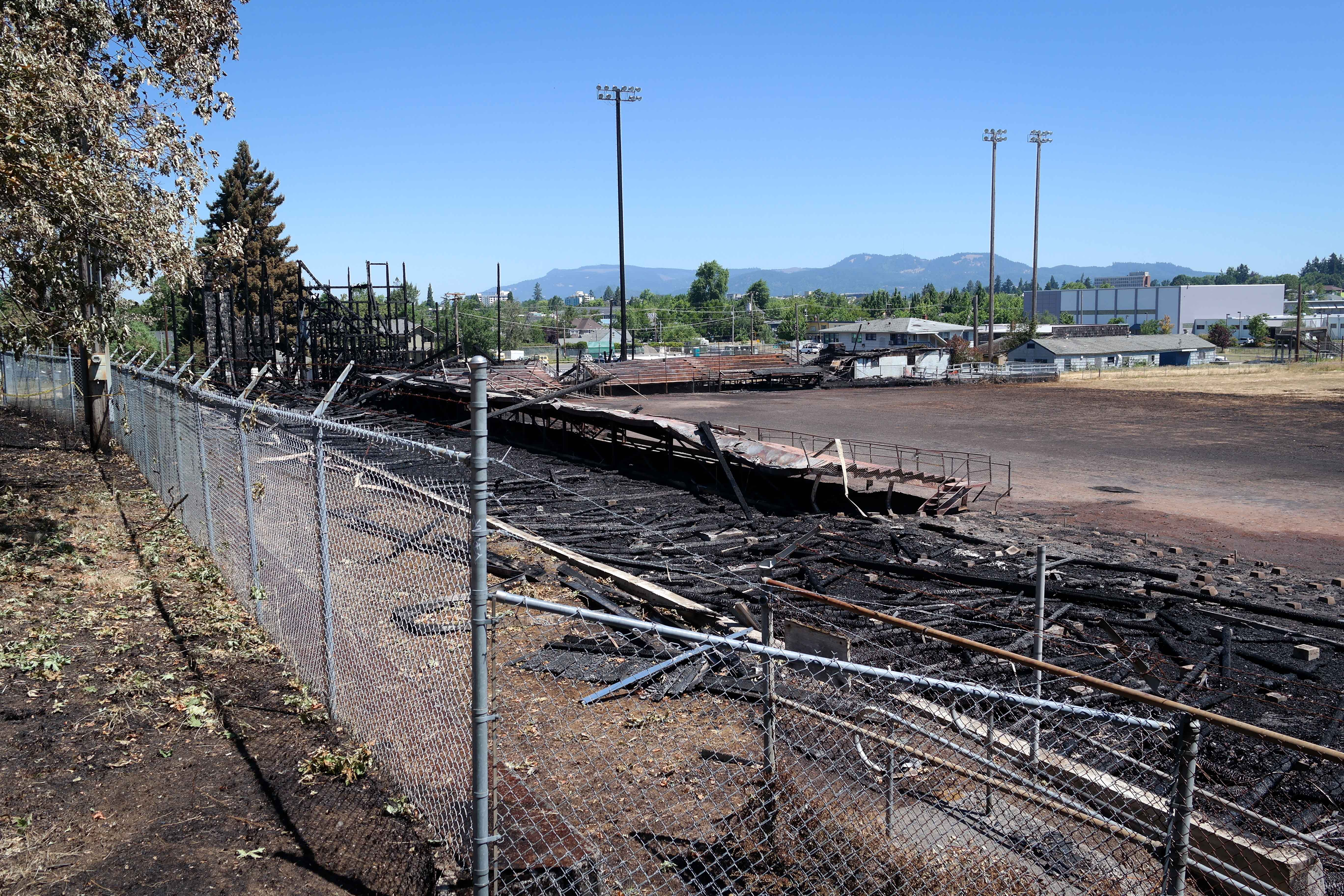
Former grandstand and field, July 2015

== New facility ==
In 2020, the stadium site was replaced with a youth sports facility, Civic Park, with a fieldhouse and an outdoor artificial turf soccer field. In 2024, locker rooms and seating for 3,500 spectators was added to complete the stadium project. The lower-league soccer club Sporting Cascades FC of third-division league USL League One was expected to play its home games at the stadium beginning in 2025, but was delayed until 2027. Currently, the Bushnell University soccer teams compete at Civic Park.

== See also ==
- List of Oregon's Most Endangered Places
- National Register of Historic Places listings in Lane County, Oregon
