= Market of Choice =

Supermarket chain

Market of Choice, Inc.

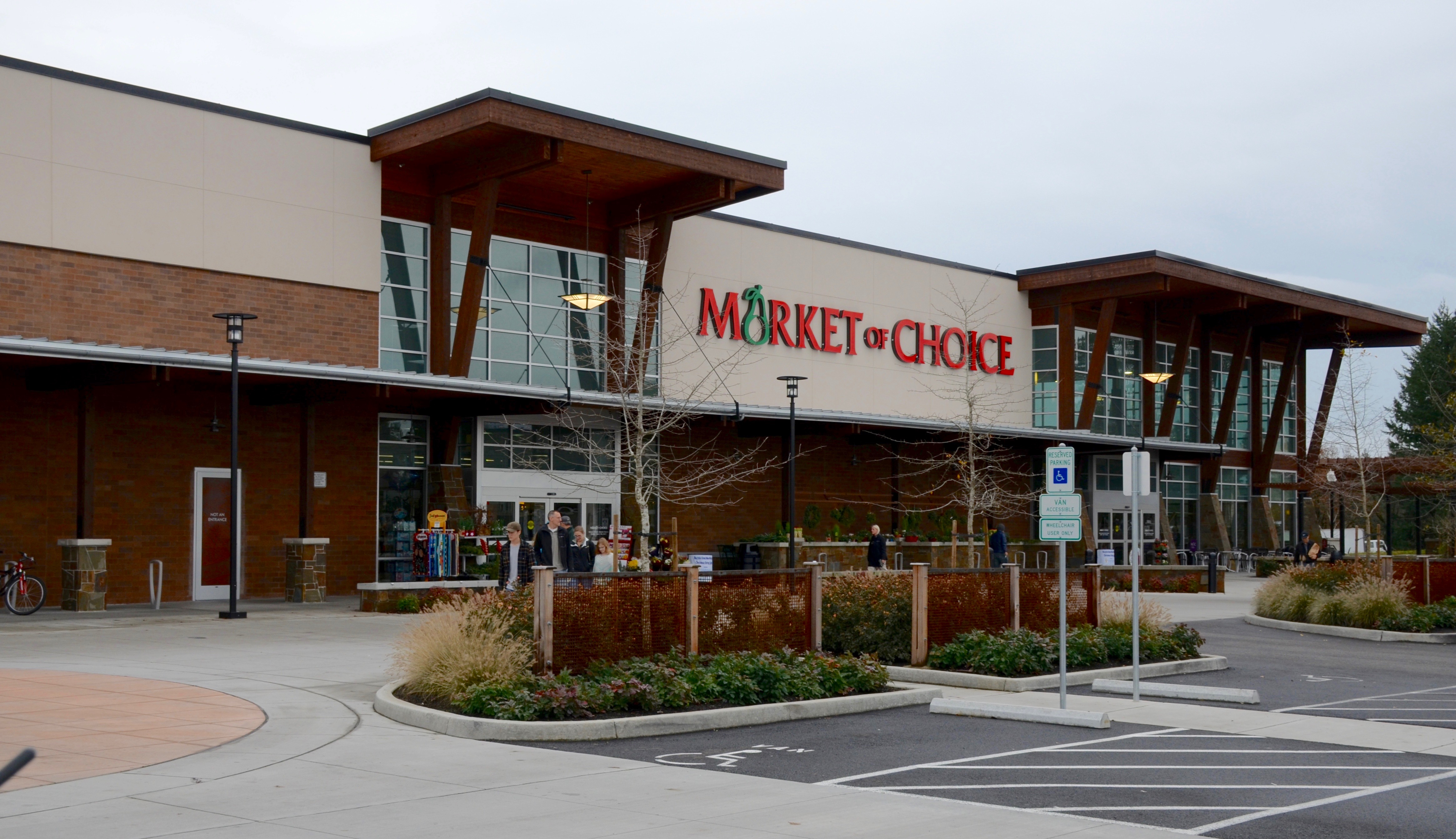
- Market of Choice in Cedar Mill, Oregon
- Type: Private
- Industry: Retail (grocery)
- Founded: 1979 (47 years ago) in Cottage Grove, Oregon
- Founder: Richard Wright Sr.
- Headquarters: Eugene, Oregon, U.S.
- Number of locations: 12
- Area served: Oregon
- Key people: Richard Wright Sr. (Founder, Chairman & CEO)
- Products: Bakery, delicatessen, dairy, grocery, frozen foods, organic foods, bulk foods, meat, produce, seafood, wine, beer, spirits, floral products, pet supplies, general merchandise, natural food, organic food, coffee
- Revenue: ▲US$235 million (FY 2021)
- Owner: Richard Wright
- Number of employees: 1,000 (FY 2021)
- Website: marketofchoice.com

Market of Choice is a supermarket chain based in Eugene, Oregon, United States. The store carries traditional grocery products, as well as those that are specifically natural and organic.

== History ==
The Market of Choice stores are owned by Market of Choice, Inc. The company began in 1979 with a single store owned by Richard Wright, Sr. in Cottage Grove, Oregon.

The company is now run by the founder's son, Rick Wright. Rick reorganized his father's company, which included Price Chopper and Thriftway stores, and created Market of Choice. As part of its rebranding, Price Chopper stores transitioned to the name PC Market and finally to Market of Choice.

By 2011, Market of Choice had seven stores, with four in Eugene and one in each of Ashland, Portland, West Linn and Corvallis. In June 2016, with the opening of a store in Bend, the total had risen to ten. The Belmont store is a retail anchor for the four-building Goat Blocks mixed-use development, which includes 347 residential units and approximately 97,000 square feet of retail space. The most recent addition was in 2020, with a store opening in Medford.

In 2014, chicken liver pâté prepared and sold by a Market of Choice store was linked to a campylobacter outbreak. The chicken liver was supplied raw from a processor and was prepared into pate by Market of Choice. Such incident is associated with undercooking during preparation.

In Portland, near SW Terwilliger Boulevard and Taylor's Ferry Boulevard, the first Market of Choice location outside the Eugene region was established in 2002 and later closed down in April 2019. Company leadership cited limited parking, increased traffic congestion, and space constraints as reasons for the closure.

The company's 50,000 square foot commercial production kitchen and food distribution facility in Eugene opened in 2012. Market of Choice, Inc. also operates Venue 252, a 20,000 square foot events facility opened in 2015 in Eugene.

== Local recognition ==
Market of Choice stores were said to have the best salad bars in Lane County, in The Register-Guard's Readers' Choice awards in 2010. The previous year, it won first place as Lane County's best grocery store as well as second place as its best store for natural food.

== Unlawful conduct ==
In 2022, KGW reported Market of Choice on Belmont street in Portland stopped accepting bottle returns in violation of the law. The store manager have acknowledged their requirement under law to accept them. The manager told the news "homeless people returning bottles have assaulted their staff" The store has opted to continue violating the law and risk fines rather than complying.

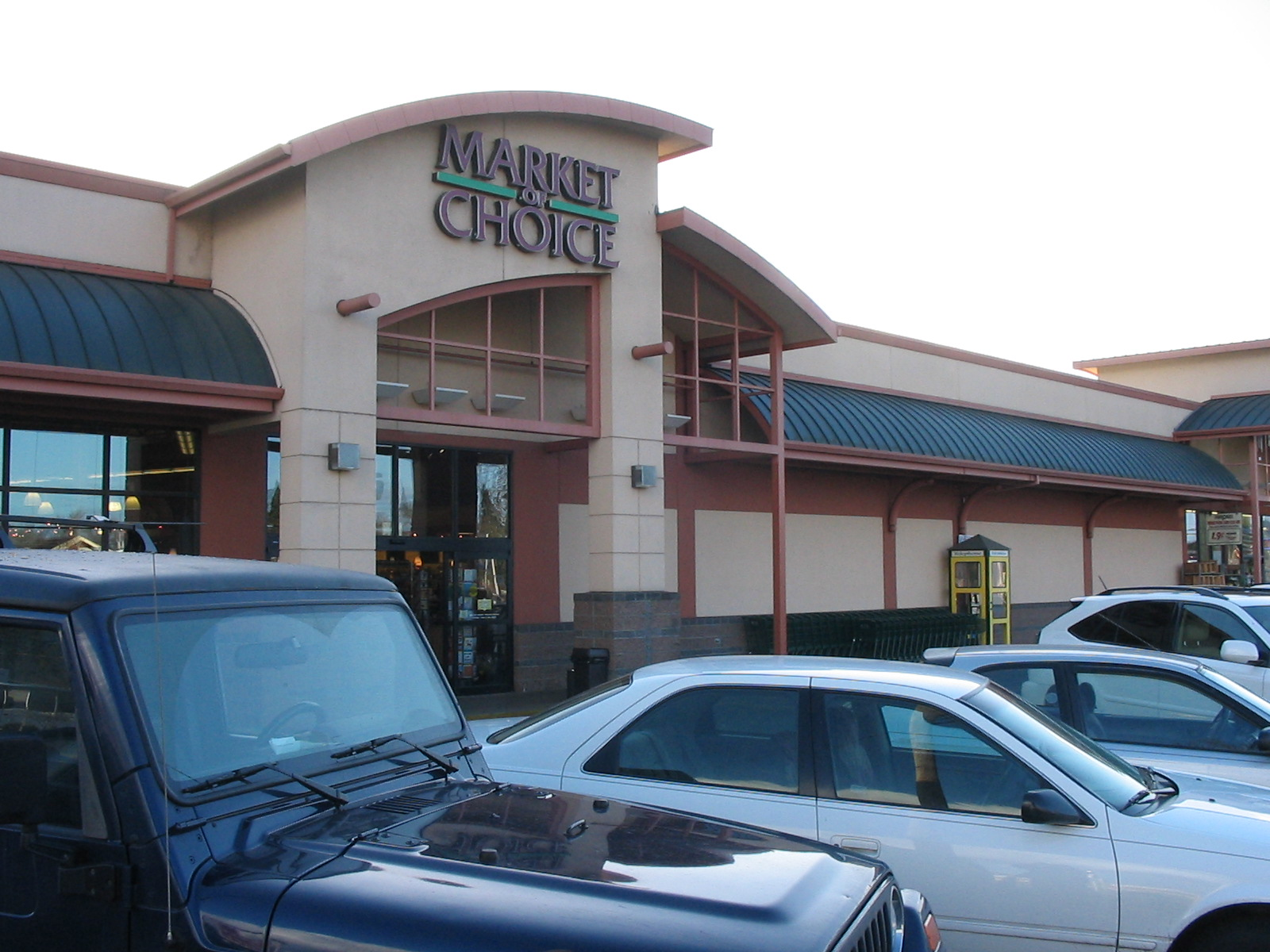
A Market of Choice store in Eugene
