= USL League One =

American professional soccer league

- Organizing body: United Soccer League
- Founded: April 2, 2017; 9 years ago
- First season: 2019
- Country: United States
- Confederation: CONCACAF
- Number of clubs: 17
- Level on pyramid: 3
- Promotion to: USL Championship (starting 2028)
- Domestic cup: U.S. Open Cup
- League cup: USL Cup
- Current champion(s): Charlotte Independence (2026)
- Current Players' Shield: Charlotte Independence (2026)
- Most championships: Union Omaha (2 titles)
- Most Players' Shields: Union Omaha (3 titles)
- Top scorer: Emiliano Terzaghi (58)
- Broadcasters: CBS; ESPN+; YouTube (international)
- Website: uslleagueone.com
- Current: 2026 season

USL League One (USL1) is a professional men's soccer league in the United States that had its inaugural season in 2019. The Division 3 league is operated by the United Soccer League, the same group that operates the men's Division 2 USL Championship, women's Division 1 league USL Super League, and other leagues. In 2026, the league had 17 teams play 32 regular-season games, followed by the playoffs. All teams also participate in the USL Cup, adding four games, followed by knockout rounds.

== History ==
=== Early years (2017–2020) ===
On April 2, 2017, the USL announced that it would launch a new third-division league in 2019, with a minimum of eight clubs and relaxed requirements compared to the second-division USL Championship. The new league had the temporary name USL Division III (USL D3). The league announced that they would target cities with a population of 150,000 to one million, mostly in cities currently without a professional team.

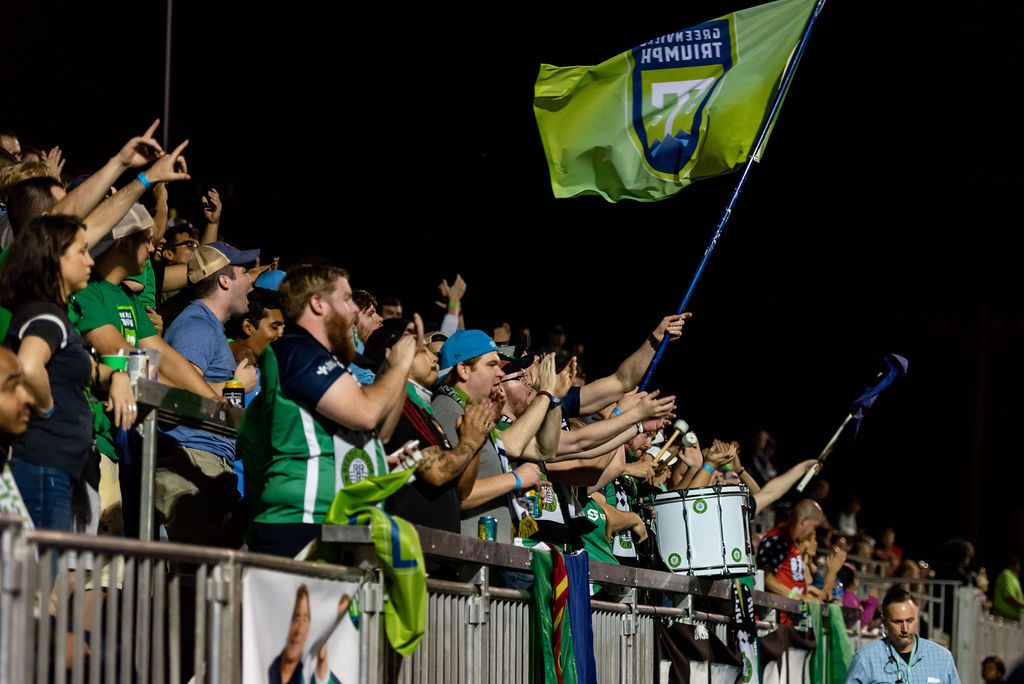
The Greenville Triumph SC (here pictured in 2019) was one of the ten founding members of the USL League One

South Georgia Tormenta FC was unveiled as the first founding member on January 25, 2018, followed by FC Tucson, Greenville Triumph SC, Madison, Wisconsin, Toronto FC II, Chattanooga, Tennessee, and the Richmond Kickers. The tenth and final founding member was the reserve team of FC Dallas, branded as North Texas SC.

The league filed for Division III status with the USSF on August 14, 2018. Ten founding teams were listed in the application. The USSF sanctioned League One as a Division III league ahead of its 2019 launch. The league shares Division III status with MLS Next Pro.

The first League One game was played on March 29, 2019, when Tormenta FC defeated Greenville Triumph SC 1–0. At the end of the season, Lansing Ignite FC folded.

=== Departure of MLS reserve teams and first wave of expansion (2020–2022) ===
For the 2020 season, Union Omaha joined the league. Additionally, the New England Revolution and Inter Miami CF placed reserve teams in the league, bringing the total number of teams to 12.

In June 2021, Major League Soccer announced the creation of a new professional soccer league, MLS Next Pro, which began play in 2022 and would host all of MLS's reserve teams along with some independent teams. Fort Lauderdale CF, New England Revolution II, North Texas SC and Toronto FC II all joined MLS Next Pro after the 2021 League One season. Former League One side Orlando City B joined MLS Next Pro for the inaugural 2022 season following a hiatus that began after the club completed the 2020 League One season.

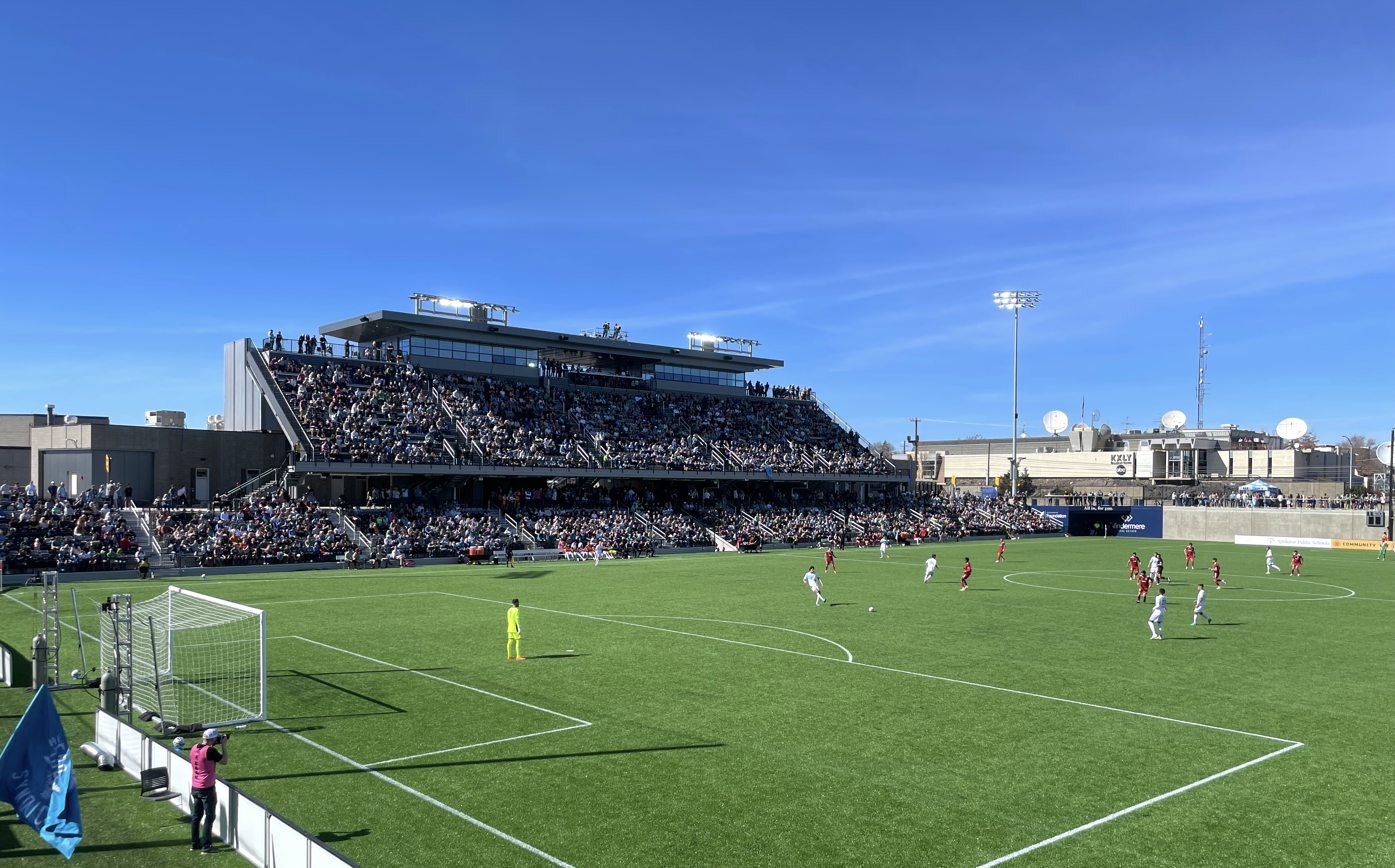
The Spokane Velocity (pictured) was one of the many expansion clubs that joined USL League One during its post-MLS reserve team departure expansion period

Central Valley Fuego FC, Charlotte Independence and Northern Colorado Hailstorm FC began play in 2022. Following the conclusion of the 2022 regular season, FC Tucson announced a self-relegation back to USL League Two. For 2023, Lexington SC entered as an expansion team, becoming League One's first club based in Kentucky, and One Knoxville SC turned professional after a successful debut season that saw it reach the USL League Two conference finals. Spokane Velocity, announced in October 2022, began play in 2024.

=== Second Wave of Expansion, & Contractions (2023–present) ===
Five expansion clubs began play in 2025. Portland Hearts of Pine, Texoma FC, and AV Alta FC had been announced in autumn 2023, and FC Naples and Westchester SC in 2024.

Lexington SC moved to the USL Championship for the 2025 season. In November 2024, the USL terminated Northern Colorado Hailstorm FC's franchise agreement and parted ways with Central Valley Fuego by mutual decision. Hailstorm and Fuego's U23 team later joined The League for Clubs.

Five clubs joined for the 2026 season. The league granted franchises to Corpus Christi FC and Athletic Club Boise in October 2024, and USL League Two clubs Sarasota Paradise and Fort Wayne FC went fully professional. The fifth, the New York Cosmos, play at Hinchliffe Stadium in Paterson, New Jersey. The club revived the name of the original Cosmos, which fielded Pelé in the original North American Soccer League. The name had previously been revived in 2010 for the relaunch of the NASL, but that club played only four professional matches after the league folded in 2017 and none since 2020.

Tormenta FC went on hiatus and did not compete in 2026. Texoma dropped to League Two after its inaugural season, with the intention of returning to League One. In September 2026, Boise announced it would move up to the USL Championship for 2027, alongside a stadium expansion.

Four more clubs are planned. Fort Lauderdale United FC, an organization with a women's club in the USL Super League, will add a men's team in 2027 after first targeting 2026. Port St. Lucie SC and Cascades FC, previously branded as Sporting Cascades FC when first announced, are also slated to begin play in 2027. Rodeo SC, started by Texoma's ownership group, is scheduled for 2028 after first targeting 2027..

== Teams ==
Locations of Current, Future, and Departing teams

For its 2026 season, seventeen teams competed in USL League One, including eight in the south and three each in the midwest, northeast, and west. The league operates under a franchise model, where the USL grants a club "franchise rights" to field a team into the league. The minimum salary for a player in the league is $2,200 per month, with no flex contracts like those in the USL Championship being offered.

Of the charter members of its inaugural 2019 season, four continue to play in the league: the Chattanooga Red Wolves SC, Forward Madison FC, Greenville Triumph SC, and Richmond Kickers. The Charlotte Independence and Kickers previously played in the USL Championship, while Corpus Christi FC, Fort Wayne FC, One Knoxville SC, Sarasota Paradise, and Tormenta moved from USL League Two. The rest of the league's membership are expansion clubs that commenced play in USL League One.

=== Current clubs ===
Member departing the league following the 2026 season.

Team	City	Stadium	Capacity	Founded	Joined	Head coach
Current teams
Athletic Club Boise	Garden City, Idaho	Stadium at Expo Idaho (Note: Soccer-specific stadium)	8,003	2024	2026	(United States) Nate Miller
AV Alta FC	Lancaster, California	Lancaster Municipal Stadium	5,300	2023	2025	(United States) Brian Kleiban
Charlotte Independence	Charlotte, North Carolina	American Legion Memorial Stadium	10,500	2014	2022	(United States) Mike Jeffries
Chattanooga Red Wolves SC	East Ridge, Tennessee	CHI Memorial Stadium	6,000	2018	2019	(England) Scott Mackenzie
Corpus Christi FC	Corpus Christi, Texas	Cabaniss Athletic Complex (Note: Shared facility)	8,000	2017	2026	(Libya) Éamon Zayed
Fort Wayne FC	Fort Wayne, Indiana	Ruoff Mortgage Stadium	9,200	2019	2026	(United States) Mike Avery
Forward Madison FC	Madison, Wisconsin	Breese Stevens Field	5,000	2018	2019	(United States) Matt Glaeser
Greenville Triumph SC	Mauldin, South Carolina	GE Vernova Park	6,300	2018	2019	(United States) Joel Tyson (interim)
FC Naples	Naples, Florida	Paradise Coast Sports Complex Stadium	5,000	2024	2025	Vacant
New York Cosmos	Paterson, New Jersey	Hinchliffe Stadium (Note: Baseball park)	10,000	2025	2026	(Italy) Davide Corti
One Knoxville SC	Knoxville, Tennessee	Covenant Health Park	6,355	2021	2023	(United States) Ian Fuller
Portland Hearts of Pine	Portland, Maine	Fitzpatrick Stadium	6,000	2023	2025	(United States) Bobby Murphy
Richmond Kickers	Richmond, Virginia	City Stadium	6,000	1993	2019	(United States) Brian Ownby
Sarasota Paradise	Lakewood Ranch, Florida	Premier Sports Campus	3,000	2022	2026	(Finland) Mika Elovaara
Spokane Velocity FC	Spokane, Washington	ONE Spokane Stadium	5,100	2021	2024	(England) Leigh Veidman
Union Omaha	Omaha, Nebraska	Morrison Stadium	9,023	2019	2020	(Colombia) Vincenzo Candela
Westchester SC	Mount Vernon, New York	The Stadium at Memorial Field	3,900	2024	2025	(United States) George Gjokaj

=== Future clubs ===
Team	City	Stadium	Capacity	Founded	Joining	Head coach
Planned expansion teams
Cascades FC	Eugene, Oregon	Civic Park (Note: Soccer-specific stadium)	3,500	2024	2027	(United States) Darren Sawatzky
Fort Lauderdale United FC	Fort Lauderdale, Florida	Amerant Bank Field	7,000	2025	2027	(United States) Marc Lue Young
Port St. Lucie SC	Port St. Lucie, Florida	Walton & One Stadium	6,000	2025	2027	TBD
Thousand Oaks Pro Soccer	Thousand Oaks, California	TBD	TBD	2026	2027	TBD
Rodeo SC	Celina, Texas	Bobcat Stadium	6,500	2025	2028	TBD
USL Long Island	Hempstead, New York	James M. Shuart Stadium	11,929	2026	2028	TBD

=== Former teams ===
Club	City	Stadium	Capacity	Joined	Final season	Fate	Ref.
Central Valley Fuego FC	Fresno, California	Fresno State Soccer Stadium (Note: Soccer-specific stadium)	1,000	2022	2024	Moved to The League for Clubs	
Fort Lauderdale CF	Fort Lauderdale, Florida	DRV PNK Stadium	18,000	2020	2021	Moved to MLS Next Pro	
Lansing Ignite FC	Lansing, Michigan	Cooley Law School Stadium (Note: Baseball park)	7,527	2019	2019	Folded	
Lexington SC	Lexington, Kentucky	Lexington SC Stadium	7,500	2023	2024	Moved to USL Championship	
New England Revolution II	Foxborough, Massachusetts	Gillette Stadium (Note: Shared facility)	20,000	2020	2021	Moved to MLS Next Pro	
North Carolina FC	Cary, North Carolina	WakeMed Soccer Park	10,000	2021	2023	Moved to USL Championship	
North Texas SC	Arlington, Texas	Choctaw Stadium	48,114	2019	2021	Moved to MLS Next Pro	
Northern Colorado Hailstorm FC	Windsor, Colorado	4Rivers Equipment Stadium	2,500	2022	2024	Moved to The League for Clubs	
Orlando City B	Kissimmee, Florida	Osceola County Stadium	5,400	2019	2020	Moved to MLS Next Pro	
South Georgia Tormenta FC	Statesboro, Georgia	Tormenta Stadium	5,300	2019	2025	Withdrew from 2026 USL League One season; no timeline for return	
Texoma FC	Sherman, Texas	Historic Bearcat Stadium	6,500	2025	2025	Moved to USL League Two	
Toronto FC II	Toronto, Ontario	BMO Training Ground	1,000	2019	2021	Moved to MLS Next Pro	
FC Tucson	Tucson, Arizona	Kino North Stadium	3,200	2019	2022	Moved to USL League Two	

== Champions ==
Teams that no longer participate in USL League One are in italics.

Season	Teams	Playoff champions	Players' Shield (Note: Known as "Regular season champions" from 2019 to 2022)
2019	10	North Texas SC	North Texas SC
2020	11	Greenville Triumph SC (Note: The 2020 Final was cancelled due to the COVID-19 pandemic. Greenville was awarded the championship based on points per game.)	Greenville Triumph SC
2021	12	Union Omaha	Union Omaha
2022	11	South Georgia Tormenta FC	Richmond Kickers
2023	12	North Carolina FC	Union Omaha
2024	12	Union Omaha	Union Omaha
2025	14	One Knoxville SC	One Knoxville SC
2026	17	Charlotte Independence	Charlotte Independence

=== USL League One Finals ===
Season	Champions	Score	Runners–up	Venue	Attendance	MVP	Ref.
2019	North Texas SC	1–0	Greenville Triumph SC	Toyota Stadium	3,245	(Mexico) Arturo Rodríguez (NTX)	
2020	Greenville Triumph SC	Cancelled	Union Omaha	Legacy Early College Field	N/A	N/A	
2021	Union Omaha	3–0	Greenville Triumph SC	Werner Park	5,221	(Spain) Damià Viader (OMA)	
2022	South Georgia Tormenta FC	2–1	Chattanooga Red Wolves SC	Optim Sports Medicine Field	3,045	(England) Kazaiah Sterling (TRM)	
2023	North Carolina FC	1–1 (5–4 PK)	Charlotte Independence	WakeMed Soccer Park	4,487	(Saint Kitts and Nevis) Raheem Somersall (NCA)	
2024	Union Omaha	3–0	Spokane Velocity FC	Werner Park	5,849	(United States) Joe Gallardo (OMA)	
2025	One Knoxville SC	2–0	Spokane Velocity FC	Covenant Health Park	7,500	(United States) Nico Rosamilia (KNX)	
2026	Charlotte Independence	4–2	Athletic Club Boise	Sportsplex at Matthews	3,326	(Cameroon) Souaibou Marou (CLT)	

== Attendance ==
Season	Teams	League avg.	Playoff avg.	Highest teams	Lowest teams	Ref
2019	10	1,911	3,217	4,292 (Madison); 3,468 (Richmond)	168 (Toronto); 203 (Orlando)	
2020	N/A	N/A	N/A	N/A	N/A	
2021	12	1,721	3,098	3,287 (Omaha); 2,761 (Madison)	151 (New England); 849 (North Texas)	
2022	11	2,203	2,865	4,759 (Madison); 3,551 (Richmond)	516 (Northern Colorado); 1,041 (South Georgia)	
2023	12	2,363	2,604	4,786 (Richmond); 4,310 (Madison)	735 (Central Valley); 1,322 (South Georgia)	
2024	12	2,329	3,262	4,672 (Richmond); 4,242 (Madison)	728 (Central Valley); 1,077 (Charlotte)	
2025	14	2,785	3,968	5,808 (Portland) 4,369 (Richmond)	719 (South Georgia) 773 (Charlotte)	

== See also ==
- Soccer in the United States
- Professional sports leagues in the United States
- USL Championship
- USL League Two
- USL W League
- USL Second Division
- National Independent Soccer Association
