= List of soccer clubs in the United States =

This is a list of soccer clubs in the United States. For clarity, teams based outside the United States that play in USSF-recognized leagues are also listed below with their home country noted.

Five professional leagues of men's soccer teams are sanctioned by the Professional Division of the United States Soccer Federation (USSF or U.S. Soccer). The top-level men's league is Major League Soccer (MLS) and the second level men's league is the USL Championship. The third level men's leagues are USL League One, the National Independent Soccer Association, and MLS Next Pro. At the semi-professional level, the USL League Two and the National Premier Soccer League have teams.

Two professional women's soccer leagues are sanctioned by U.S. Soccer, both at the top level— the National Women's Soccer League (NWSL), which has operated since 2013, and the USL Super League (USLS), which started play in the 2024–25 season. While the NWSL and all professional men's leagues (as of 2024) in the United States play in the summer, USLS plays in the winter, matching the international calendar. At the semi-professional level, the USL W League has teams.

== Major League Soccer ==
=== 2026 MLS clubs ===
Club	Founded	Home city	Stadium	Conference position last season	Season joined
Eastern Conference
Atlanta United FC	2014	Atlanta, Georgia	Mercedes-Benz Stadium	14th	2017
Charlotte FC	2019	Charlotte, North Carolina	Bank of America Stadium	4th	2022
Chicago Fire FC	1997	Chicago, Illinois	Soldier Field	8th	1998
FC Cincinnati	2015	Cincinnati, Ohio	TQL Stadium	2nd	2019
Columbus Crew	1994	Columbus, Ohio	ScottsMiracle-Gro Field	7th	1996
D.C. United	1994	Washington, D.C.	Audi Field	15th	1996
Inter Miami CF	2018	Miami, Florida	Nu Stadium	3rd	2020
CF Montréal (Note: Played as Montreal Impact until the end of the 2020 season)	1992	Montreal, Quebec (Note: Located in Canada)	Saputo Stadium	13th	2012
Nashville SC	2016	Nashville, Tennessee	Geodis Park	6th	2020
New England Revolution	1995	Foxborough, Massachusetts	Gillette Stadium	11th	1996
New York City FC	2013	New York City, New York	Yankee Stadium	5th	2015
New York Red Bulls (Note: Played as New York/New Jersey MetroStars until the end of the 2005 season)	1994	Harrison, New Jersey	Sports Illustrated Stadium	10th	1996
Orlando City SC	2010	Orlando, Florida	Inter.co Stadium	9th	2015
Philadelphia Union	2008	Chester, Pennsylvania	Subaru Park	1st	2010
Toronto FC	2005	Toronto, Ontario	BMO Field	12th	2007
Western Conference
Austin FC	2018	Austin, Texas	Q2 Stadium	6th	2021
Colorado Rapids	1995	Commerce City, Colorado	Dick's Sporting Goods Park	11th	1996
FC Dallas (Note: Played as Dallas Burn until the end of the 2004 season)	1995	Frisco, Texas	Toyota Stadium	7th	1996
Houston Dynamo FC	2005	Houston, Texas	Shell Energy Stadium	12th	2006
LA Galaxy	1994	Carson, California	Dignity Health Sports Park	14th	1996
Los Angeles FC	2014	Los Angeles, California	BMO Stadium	3rd	2018
Minnesota United FC	2015	Saint Paul, Minnesota	Allianz Field	4th	2017
Portland Timbers	2009	Portland, Oregon	Providence Park	8th	2011
Real Salt Lake	2004	Sandy, Utah	America First Field	9th	2005
San Diego FC	2023	San Diego, California	Snapdragon Stadium	1st	2025
San Jose Earthquakes (Note: Played as San Jose Clash until the end of the 2000 season)	1994	San Jose, California	PayPal Park	10th	1996
Seattle Sounders FC	2007	Seattle, Washington	Lumen Field	5th	2009
Sporting Kansas City (Note: Played as Kansas City Wizards until the end of the 2010 season)	1995	Kansas City, Kansas	Sporting Park	15th	1996
St. Louis City SC	2019	St. Louis, Missouri	Energizer Park	13th	2023
Vancouver Whitecaps FC	1974	Vancouver, British Columbia	BC Place	2nd	2011

== USL Championship ==
=== 2026 USLC clubs ===
Club	Founded	Home city	Stadium	Conference position last season	Season joined
Eastern Conference
Birmingham Legion FC	2017	Birmingham, Alabama	Protective Stadium	12th	2019
Brooklyn FC	2023	Brooklyn, New York	Maimonides Park	Debut season	2026
Charleston Battery	1993	Mount Pleasant, South Carolina	Patriots Point Soccer Complex	2nd	2011
Detroit City FC	2012	Hamtramck, Michigan	Keyworth Stadium	8th	2022
Hartford Athletic	2018	Hartford, Connecticut	Trinity Health Stadium	5th	2019
Indy Eleven	2013	Indianapolis, Indiana	IU Michael A. Carroll Track & Soccer Stadium	9th	2018
Loudoun United FC	2018	Leesburg, Virginia	Segra Field	6th	2019
Louisville City FC	2014	Louisville, Kentucky	Lynn Family Stadium	1st	2015
Miami FC	2015	Miami, Florida (Note: The stadium has a Miami mailing address, but is located in the unincorporated Miami-Dade County community of Westchester.)	Pitbull Stadium	11th	2020
Pittsburgh Riverhounds SC	1998	Pittsburgh, Pennsylvania	F.N.B. Stadium	4th	2011
Rhode Island FC	2019	Pawtucket, Rhode Island	Centreville Bank Stadium	7th	2024
Sporting Club Jacksonville	2022	Jacksonville, Florida	Hodges Stadium	Debut season	2026
Tampa Bay Rowdies	2008	St. Petersburg, Florida	Al Lang Stadium	10th	2017
Western Conference
Colorado Springs Switchbacks FC	2013	Colorado Springs, Colorado	Weidner Field	8th	2015
El Paso Locomotive FC	2018	El Paso, Texas	Southwest University Park	4th	2019
Las Vegas Lights FC	2017	Las Vegas, Nevada	Cashman Field	12th	2018
Lexington SC	2021	Lexington, Kentucky	Lexington SC Stadium	9th	2025
Monterey Bay FC	2021	Seaside, California	Cardinale Stadium	11th	2022
New Mexico United	2018	Albuquerque, New Mexico	Isotopes Park	3rd	2019
Oakland Roots SC	2018	Oakland, California	Oakland Coliseum	10th	2021
Orange County SC	1998	Irvine, California	Championship Soccer Stadium	7th	2011
Phoenix Rising FC	2014	Chandler, Arizona	Phoenix Rising Soccer Stadium	5th	2014
Sacramento Republic FC	2012	Sacramento, California	Heart Health Park	2nd	2014
San Antonio FC	2016	San Antonio, Texas	Toyota Field	6th	2016
FC Tulsa	2013	Tulsa, Oklahoma	ONEOK Field	1st	2015

== USL League One ==
=== 2026 USL2 clubs ===
Club	Founded	Home city	Stadium	Finishing position last season	Season joined
Athletic Club Boise	2024	Garden City, Idaho	Stadium at Expo Idaho	Debut season	2026
AV Alta FC	2023	Lancaster, California	The Hangar	9th	2025
Charlotte Independence	2014	Charlotte, North Carolina	American Legion Memorial Stadium	8th	2022
Chattanooga Red Wolves SC	2018	Chattanooga, Tennessee	CHI Memorial Stadium	2nd	2019
Corpus Christi FC	2017	Corpus Christi, Texas	Cabaniss Athletic Complex	Debut season	2026
Fort Wayne FC	2019	Fort Wayne, Indiana	Ruoff Mortgage Stadium	Debut season	2026
Forward Madison FC	2018	Madison, Wisconsin	Breese Stevens Field	10th	2019
Greenville Triumph SC	2018	Mauldin, South Carolina	GE Vernova Park	11th	2019
FC Naples	2024	Naples, Florida	Paradise Coast Sports Complex	4th	2025
New York Cosmos	2025	Paterson, New Jersey	Hinchliffe Stadium	Debut season	2026
One Knoxville SC	2021	Knoxville, Tennessee	Covenant Health Park	1st	2023
Portland Hearts of Pine	2023	Portland, Maine	Fitzpatrick Stadium	7th	2025
Richmond Kickers	1993	Richmond, Virginia	City Stadium	13th	2019
Sarasota Paradise	2022	Lakewood Ranch, Florida	Premier Sports Campus	Debut season	2026
Spokane Velocity	2022	Spokane, Washington	One Spokane Stadium	3rd	2024
Union Omaha	2019	Omaha, Nebraska	Morrison Stadium	5th	2020
Westchester SC	2024	Mount Vernon, New York	The Stadium at Memorial Field	14th	2025

== MLS Next Pro ==
=== 2026 MLS Next Pro clubs ===
Club	Founded	Home city	Stadium	Conference position last season	Season joined	MLS affiliate
Eastern Conference
Atlanta United 2	2017	Kennesaw, Georgia (Note: The stadium has a Kennesaw mailing address, but is in unincorporated Cobb County.)	Fifth Third Stadium	10th	2023	Atlanta United FC
Carolina Core FC	2022	High Point, North Carolina	Truist Point	8th	2024	Independent club
Chattanooga FC	2009	Chattanooga, Tennessee	Finley Stadium	4th	2024	Independent club
Chicago Fire FC II	2021	Bridgeview, Illinois	SeatGeek Stadium	6th	2022	Chicago Fire FC
FC Cincinnati 2	2021	Highland Heights, Kentucky	NKU Soccer Stadium	7th	2022	FC Cincinnati
Columbus Crew 2	2021	Columbus, Ohio	Historic Crew Stadium	15th	2022	Columbus Crew
Crown Legacy FC	2022	Matthews, North Carolina	Sportsplex at Matthews	13th	2023	Charlotte FC
CT United FC	2024	Bridgeport, Connecticut	Various	Debut season	2026	Independent club
Huntsville City FC	2022	Huntsville, Alabama	Joe W. Davis Stadium	5th	2023	Nashville SC
Inter Miami CF II	2019	Fort Lauderdale, Florida	Inter Miami CF Stadium	14th	2022	Inter Miami CF
New England Revolution II	2019	Smithfield, Rhode Island	Beirne Stadium	3rd	2022	New England Revolution
New York City FC II	2021	New York City, New York	Belson Stadium	12th	2022	New York City FC
New York Red Bulls II	2015	Montclair, New Jersey	MSU Soccer Park	1st	2023	New York Red Bulls
Orlando City B	2015	Kissimmee, Florida	Osceola County Stadium	11th	2022	Orlando City SC
Philadelphia Union II	2015	Chester, Pennsylvania	Subaru Park	2nd	2022	Philadelphia Union
Toronto FC II	2014	Toronto, Ontario	York Lions Stadium	9th	2022	Toronto FC
Western Conference
Austin FC II	2022	Austin, Texas	Parmer Field	9th	2023	Austin FC
Colorado Rapids 2	2021	Denver, Colorado	Denver Soccer Stadium	3rd	2022	Colorado Rapids
Houston Dynamo 2	2021	Houston, Texas	SaberCats Stadium	11th	2022	Houston Dynamo
Los Angeles FC 2	2022	Fullerton, California	Titan Stadium	13th	2023	Los Angeles FC
Minnesota United FC 2	2021	Blaine, Minnesota	National Sports Center	5th	2022	Minnesota United FC
North Texas SC	2018	Mansfield, Texas	Texas Health Mansfield Stadium	6th	2022	FC Dallas
Portland Timbers 2	2014	Portland, Oregon	Providence Park	10th	2022	Portland Timbers
Real Monarchs	2014	Herriman, Utah	Zions Bank Stadium	4th	2022	Real Salt Lake
San Jose Earthquakes II	2021	Moraga, California	Saint Mary's Stadium	2nd	2022	San Jose Earthquakes
Sporting Kansas City II	2015	Kansas City, Missouri	Swope Soccer Village	14th	2022	Sporting Kansas City
St. Louis City 2	2021	St. Louis, Missouri	Energizer Park	1st	2022	St. Louis City SC
Tacoma Defiance	2014	Tukwila, Washington	Starfire Sports	12th	2022	Seattle Sounders FC
Ventura County FC	2014	Thousand Oaks, California	William Rolland Stadium	8th	2023	LA Galaxy
Whitecaps FC 2	2014	Burnaby, British Columbia	Swangard Stadium	7th	2022	Vancouver Whitecaps FC

== USL League Two ==
=== 2026 USL2 teams ===
Club	Home city	Stadium	Founded	Season joined
Eastern Conference
Northeast Division
AC Connecticut (Note: Played as CFC Azul until the end of the 2014 season.)	Danbury, Connecticut	Westside Athletic Complex	2011	2012
Albany Rush (Note: Played as Blackwatch Rush until the end of the 2022 season.)	Schenectady, New York	Union College	2021	2022
Black Rock FC	Nashua, New Hampshire	Rivier University	2013	2018
Boston Bolts (Note: Played as FC Boston until the end of the 2018 season.)	Waltham, Massachusetts	Brandeis University	2015	2016
Boston City FC	Malden, Massachusetts	Malden Catholic High School	2015	2022
Connecticut Rush	Old Lyme, Connecticut	Lyme-Old Lyme High School	2012	2026
NEFC	Mendon, Massachusetts	Alumni Stadium	2009	2025
Seacoast United Phantoms (Note: Played as New Hampshire Phantoms until the end of the 2011 season.)	Epping, New Hampshire	Seacoast United Outdoor Complex	1996	2008
Vermont Green FC	Burlington, Vermont	Virtue Field	2021	2022
Western Mass Pioneers	Ludlow, Massachusetts	Lusitano Stadium	1998	2010
Mid Atlantic Division
Delaware FC	Wilmington, Delaware	Abessinio Stadium	1989	2025
Eagle FC	Mechanicsburg, Pennsylvania	Mountain View High School	1976	2026
Lehigh Valley United	Bethlehem, Pennsylvania	Rocco Calvo Field	2009	2015
Ocean City Nor'easters (Note: Played as South Jersey Barons until the end of the 2009 season.)	Ocean City, New Jersey	Carey Stadium	1996	2003
Pennsylvania Classics AC	Lancaster, Pennsylvania	Spooky Nook Sports Complex	2003	2026
Philadelphia Lone Star FC	Philadelphia, Pennsylvania	South Philadelphia Athletic Super Site	2001	2021
Reading United AC (Note: Played as Reading Rage until the end of the 2009 season.)	Reading, Pennsylvania	Don Thomas Stadium	1996	2004
Real Central New Jersey	Lawrence Township, New Jersey	Ben Cohen Field	2020	2021
West Chester United SC	West Chester, Pennsylvania	Kildare's Field	1976	2020
Metropolitan Division
Cedar Stars Rush	Teaneck, New Jersey	Fairleigh Dickinson University	2018	2019
Hudson Valley Hammers	Newburgh, New York	Mount Saint Mary College	2021	2022
Ironbound SC	Newark, New Jersey	Eddie Moraes Stadium	2006	2023
Long Island Rough Riders	Hempstead, New York	Hofstra University Soccer Stadium	1994	2007
Manhattan SC	New York City, New York	Gaelic Park	1997	2019
Morris Elite SC	Livingston, New Jersey	Livingston High School	2016	2021
FC Motown	Morristown, New Jersey	Ranger Stadium	2012	2021
New Jersey Copa FC	Metuchen, New Jersey	St. Joseph High School	2004	2021
Staten Island Athletic ASC (Note: Played as Springfield Athletic SC until the end of the 2023 season.)	Staten Island, New York	Lions for Hope Sports Complex	2021	2022
Westchester Flames	New Rochelle, New York	City Park Stadium	1999	2005 (Note: Originally joined in the 1999 season, but left the league after the 2001 season. Rejoined in 2005.)
Chesapeake Division
Annapolis Blues FC	Annapolis, Maryland	Navy–Marine Corps Memorial Stadium	2022	2025
Bethesda SC	Germantown, Maryland	Maryland SoccerPlex	1979	2026
Charlottesville Blues FC	Charlottesville, Virginia	St. Anne's-Belfield School	2023	2024
Christos FC	Baltimore, Maryland	Under Armour Stadium	1997	2022
Hill City FC	Lynchburg, Virginia	City Stadium	2025	2026
Lionsbridge FC	Newport News, Virginia	TowneBank Stadium	2017	2018
Loudoun United FC 2	Leesburg, Virginia	Segra Field	2018	2026
Northern Virginia FC (Note: Played as Northern Virginia Royals until the end of the 2014 season, then as D.C. United U-23 until the end of the 2015 season, and finally as Evergreen FC until the end of the 2020 season.)	Leesburg, Virginia	Segra Field	1998	2006
Patuxent Football Athletics	Leonardtown, Maryland	St. Mary's Ryken High School	2018	2022
Virginia Beach United FC	Virginia Beach, Virginia	Virginia Beach Sportsplex	2019	2019
Virginia Marauders FC	Winchester, Virginia	Winchester Sportsplex	2023	2023
South Atlantic Division
Appalachian FC	Boone, North Carolina	ASU Soccer Stadium	2020	2026
Asheville City SC	Asheville, North Carolina	University of North Carolina at Asheville	2016	2020
Charlotte Eagles	Matthews, North Carolina	Sportsplex at Matthews	1991	2015
Charlotte Independence II	Rock Hill, South Carolina	Manchester Meadows Soccer Complex	2019	2020
North Carolina FC U23 (Note: Played as Raleigh CASL Elite until the end of the 2006 season, then as Carolina RailHawks U23 until the end of the 2007 season, and finally as Cary Clarets until the end of the 2009 season.)	Cary, North Carolina	WakeMed Soccer Park	2017	2017 (Note: Originally joined in the 2002 season, but left the league after the 2009 season. Rejoined in 2017.)
Hickory FC	Hickory, North Carolina	Moretz Stadium	2023	2026
Salem City FC (Note: Played as Greensboro Dynamo until the end of the 2018 season, then as North Carolina Fusion U23 until the end of the 2023 season.)	Greensboro, North Carolina	Macpherson Stadium	1993	2003
Tobacco Road FC	Durham, North Carolina	Durham County Memorial Stadium	2013	2017
SC United Bantams (Note: Played as Palmetto FC Bantams until the end of the 2012 season.)	Columbia, South Carolina	Southeastern Freight Lines Soccer Complex	2012	2012
Wake FC	Holly Springs, North Carolina	Ting Park	2001	2019
Central Conference
Great Forest Division
Akron City FC	Akron, Ohio	St. Vincent–St. Mary High School	2021	2025
FC Buffalo	Buffalo, New York	Buffalo State University	2009	2023
Cleveland Force SC	Cleveland, Ohio	Krenzler Field	2011	2022
Erie Sports Center FC	Erie, Pennsylvania	Erie Sports Center	2025	2025
Lorain County Leviathan FC	Avon, Ohio	ForeFront Field	2025	2026
Pittsburgh Riverhounds 2	Pittsburgh, Pennsylvania	F.N.B. Stadium	2013	2026
Steel City FC	Cheswick, Pennsylvania	Founders Field	2019	2025
Great Lakes Division
AFC Ann Arbor	Ann Arbor, Michigan	Saline Hornet Stadium	2014	2016
Flint City Bucks (Note: Played as Mid-Michigan Bucks until the end of the 2003 season, then as Michigan Bucks until the end of the 2018 season.)	Flint, Michigan	Atwood Stadium	1995	1996
Kalamazoo FC	Kalamazoo, Michigan	Soisson-Rapacz-Clason Field	2015	2021
Lansing City Football	Lansing, Michigan	Cougar Stadium	2016	2022
Midwest United FC	Grand Rapids, Michigan	Aquinas College	1990	2022
Oakland County FC	Clawson, Michigan	Clawson Stadium	2015	2020
Union FC Macomb	Macomb County, Michigan	Romeo High School	2024	2024
Great Plains Division
Union FC Macomb	Macomb County, Michigan	Romeo High School	2024	2024
Des Moines Menace	West Des Moines, Iowa	Valley Stadium	1994	1995
Peoria City	Peoria, Illinois	Shea Stadium	2020	2022
Santafé Wanderers FC	Kansas City, Missouri	Durwood Soccer Stadium	1995	2025
Springfield FC	Springfield, Illinois	Sacred Heart-Griffin High School	2011	2025
St. Louis Ambush	Creve Coeur, Missouri	Missouri Baptist University	2013	2025
Sunflower State FC	Overland Park, Kansas	Blue Valley Northwest High School	2019	2025
Heartland Division
Chicago City Dutch Lions FC	River Forest, Illinois	Dominican University	2020	2025
Edgewater Castle FC	Chicago, Illinois	Winnemac Stadium	2017	2026
Minneapolis City SC	Minneapolis, Minnesota	Edor Nelson Field	2020	2022
River Light FC	Aurora, Illinois	Aurora University	2020	2024
Third Coast	Racine, Wisconsin	Pritchard Park Multi-Purpose Field	2023	2023
Rochester FC	Rochester, Minnesota	Rochester Community and Technical College	2018	2023
Rockford Raptors	Rockford, Illinois	Mercyhealth Sportscore Two	1994	2026
Saint Croix SC	Oak Park Heights, Minnesota	Stillwater Area High School	1984	2022
Sueño FC	Joliet, Illinois	Joliet Memorial Stadium	2023	2024
Valley Division
Dayton Dutch Lions	West Carrollton, Ohio	DOC Stadium	2009	2015 (Note: Originally joined in the 2010 season, but left the league in that same year. Rejoined in 2015.)
Kings Hammer FC Columbus	New Albany, Ohio	New Albany High School	2007	2025
Louisville City FC U-23	Louisville, Kentucky	Lynn Family Sports Vision & Training Center	2014	2026
Northern Indiana FC	South Bend, Indiana	Indiana Invaders Sports Complex	2023	2025
Toledo Villa FC	Toledo, Ohio	University of Toledo	2017	2021
West Virginia United (Note: Played as West Virginia Chaos until the end of the 2017 season, then as West Virginia Alliance until the end of the 2020 season.)	Dunbar, West Virginia	Shawnee Sports Complex	2003	2003
Southern Conference
South Central Division
Apotheos FC	Atlanta, Georgia	Atlanta Silverbacks Park	2021	2025
Birmingham Legion 2	Birmingham, Alabama	Spain Park High School	2024	2024
Columbus United FC	Columbus, Georgia	A. J. McClung Memorial Stadium	2023	2025
Dothan United Dragons	Dothan, Alabama	Rip Hewes Stadium	2024	2024
East Atlanta FC	Atlanta, Georgia	Friends Field	2019	2020
Montgomery United FC	Montgomery, Alabama	Emory Folmar YMCA Soccer Complex	2024	2025
Southern Soccer Academy	Dallas, Georgia	North Paulding High School	2012	2020
Southeast Division
Brave SC (Note: Played as The Villages SC until the end of the 2023 season.)	Summerfield, Florida	Brave Sporting Complex	2016	2016
Brooke House FC	Winter Park, Florida	Showalter Field	2022	2024
Inter Gainesville KF	Gainesville, Florida	University of Florida Southwest Recreation Center	2021	2024
NONA FC	Kissimmee, Florida	Austin-Tindall Regional Park	2021	2022
Shark Coast FC	New Smyrna Beach, Florida	New Smyrna Beach Sports Complex	2024	2026
Sporting Club Jacksonville	Jacksonville, Florida	Mandarin High School	2023	2025
South Florida Division
Brevard SC	Melbourne, Florida	Melbourne Central Catholic High School	2020	2023
Fort Lauderdale United FC	Davie, Florida	Beyond Bancard Field	2023	2025
Lakeland United FC	Lakeland, Florida	Bryant Stadium	2020	2026
Miami AC	Olympia Heights, Florida	Tropical Park Stadium	2021	2022
FC Miami City	Lauderhill, Florida	Central Broward Park	2014	2014
Weston FC	Weston, Florida	Weston Regional Park	1998	2017
Mid South Division
Hattiesburg FC	Hattiesburg, Mississippi	Tatum Park	1980	2024
Jackson Boom	Jackson, Tennessee	University School of Jackson	2022	2026
Little Rock Rangers	Little Rock, Arkansas	War Memorial Stadium	2016	2016
Louisiana Krewe FC	Lafayette, Louisiana	University of Louisiana at Lafayette	2019	2022
Memphis FC	Memphis, Tennessee	Mike Rose Soccer Complex	2025	2026
Mississippi Brilla FC	Clinton, Mississippi	Clinton High School	2006	2007
Red River Raiders FC	Bossier City, Louisiana	Airline High School	2025	2025
Lone Star Division
AHFC Royals	Houston, Texas	Campbell Road Sports Park	2017	2018
Global Football Innovation Academy	Spring, Texas	GFI Performance Center	2023	2025
Hill Country Lobos	Buda, Texas	Bob Shelton Stadium	1996	2024
Houston FC	Houston, Texas	Sorrels Field	2017	2017
AC Houston Sur	Houston, Texas	The Village School	2021	2022
Laredo Heat	Laredo, Texas	PEG Energy Stadium	2004	2025
Lonestar SC	Austin, Texas	St. Andrew's Episcopal School	2004	2025
San Antonio FC 2	San Antonio, Texas	Rico's STAR Soccer Complex	2026	2026
Twin City Toucans FC (Note: Played as Brazos Valley Cavalry FC until the end of the 2022 season.)	Bryan, Texas	Edible Field	2017	2017
Ranger Division
Denton Diablos FC	Denton, Texas	Mean Green Soccer Stadium	2018	2025
Fort Worth Vaqueros FC	Fort Worth, Texas	Doskocil Stadium	2013	2026
Lubbock Matadors SC	Lubbock, Texas	Lowery Field	2021	2026
McKinney Chupacabras FC	McKinney, Texas	Ron Poe Stadium	2024	2025
Texoma FC	Denison, Texas	Munson Stadium	2023	2026
West Texas FC	Midland, Texas	Astound Broadband Stadium	2008	2026
Western Conference
Mountain Division
Albion SC Colorado (Note: Played as Boulder County United until the end of the 2023 season.)	Boulder, Colorado	Fairview High School	2021	2023
Atlético Unión	Greeley, Colorado	District 6 Stadium	2025	2026
CISA	Aurora, Colorado	Englewood High School	2012	2022
Colorado Storm	Denver, Colorado	Regis University	1967	2025
Flatirons FC (Note: Played as Colorado Rush until the end of the 2021 season and then as Flatirons Rush SC until the end of the 2023 season.)	Arvada, Colorado	North Stadium	1998	2020
Real Colorado	Meridian, Colorado	Real Colorado Soccer Complex	1986	2026
Utah United	Orem, Utah	Utah Valley University	2023	2024
Northwest Division
Ballard FC	Seattle, Washington	Interbay Soccer Field	2021	2022
Bigfoot FC	Maple Valley, Washington	Tahoma High School	2024	2025
Midlakes United	Bellevue, Washington	Bellevue College	2023	2024
FC Olympia (Note: Played as Oly Town FC until the end of the 2023 season.)	Olympia, Washington	Well 80 Pitch	2014	2022
Portland Bangers FC	Portland, Oregon	Lents Park	2025	2025
Snohomish United	Snohomish, Washington	Stocker Fields	2024	2025
Tacoma Stars	Tacoma, Washington	Bellarmine Preparatory School	2003	2024
West Seattle Junction FC	Seattle, Washington	Nino Cantu Southwest Athletics Complex	2023	2024
NorCal Division
Academica SC	Turlock, California	Academica Field	1972	2023
Almaden FC	San Jose, California	Pioneer High School	1967	2024
Davis Legacy SC	Davis, California	Davis Legacy Stadium	1989	2022
Marin FC Legends	San Rafael, California	San Rafael High School	2004	2022
Project 51O	Oakland, California	UCSF Health Training Facility	2020	2021
San Francisco City FC	San Francisco, California	Kezar Stadium	2001	2016
San Francisco Glens	San Bruno, California	Skyline College	1961	2018
San Juan SC	Folsom, California	Folsom Lake College	1978	2025
Southwest Division
AMSG FC	Westminster, California	Westminster High School	2017	2024
Capo FC	San Juan Capistrano, California	JSerra Catholic High School	2006	2023
City SC	San Diego, California	Canyon Crest Academy	1981	2025
Redlands FC	Redlands, California	Redlands High School	2022	2023
Southern California Eagles	La Mirada, California	La Mirada High School	2001	2001
FC Tucson	Tucson, Arizona	Kino Sports Complex	2010	2023 (Note: Originally joined in the 2012 season, but left the league after the 2018 season. Rejoined in 2023.)
Stars FC	Glendale, Arizona	Arizona Christian University	2024	2025
Ventura County Fusion	Ventura, California	Ventura College	2006	2007

== See also ==
- United States soccer league system
- List of NCAA Division I men's soccer programs
- List of NCAA Division II men's soccer programs
- List of NCAA Division I women's soccer programs
