= 2026 MLS SuperDraft =

College draft for soccer teams

General information
- Sport: Soccer
- Date: December 18, 2025
- Network: MLS Season Pass

Overview
- 90 total selections in 3 rounds
- League: Major League Soccer
- Teams: 30
- First selection: Nikola Marković

The 2026 MLS SuperDraft was the 26th edition of the MLS SuperDraft, a sports draft to select amateur, usually collegiate, soccer players that are not affiliated with an MLS club, or college soccer players that had their homegrown player rights relinquished by their parent MLS club. The draft was held on December 18, 2025, marking the fourth year in a row that the draft was held in December. Despite the draft being held in 2025, the draft retained the 2026 branding.

== Format ==
Historically, the MLS SuperDraft has closely resembled that of the NFL draft:

1. Any expansion teams receive the first picks. There are no expansion teams this year, so the last-place MLS team will receive the first pick
2. Non-playoff clubs receive the next picks in reverse order of prior season finish.
3. Teams that made the MLS Cup playoffs are then ordered by which round of the playoffs they are eliminated.
4. The winners of the MLS Cup are given the last selection, and the losers the penultimate selection.

== Player selection ==
Player key
*	Denotes player who has been selected for an MLS Best XI team						
^	Member of 2026 Generation Adidas class						
†	Player who was named to an MLS Best XI and Generation Adidas						
Signed key
11	Denotes player who signed for a MLS team (Division I)						
3	Denotes player who signed for a USL Championship team (Division II)						
34	Denotes player who signed for a MLS Next Pro, USL League One or NISA team (Division III)						
0	Denotes player who signed for a team outside the United States soccer league system						
22	Denotes player who returned to college team						
Positions key
GK	Goalkeeper	DF	Defender	MF	Midfielder	FW	Forward

=== First round ===
P	MLS team	Player	Year	Pos.	College	Conference	Academy team(s)	Other team(s)	Signed
1	D.C. United	(Canada) Nikola Marković^	Sophomore	DF	NC State	ACC	FC Gatineau; CS des Collines; AS Gatineau; CF Montréal	Cedar Stars Rush	(United States) D.C. United
2	FC Dallas (Note: Atlanta United → FC Dallas. FC Dallas acquired Atlanta's pick.)	(Haiti) Ricky Louis^	Sophomore	FW	Georgia Southern	SBC	Florida West FC		(United States) FC Dallas
3	FC Dallas (Note: CF Montréal → FC Dallas. FC Dallas acquired the natural first-round pick and Toronto FC's natural third-round pick in the 2026 MLS SuperDraft from CF Montréal in exchange for FC Dallas' natural second-round pick in the 2026 MLS SuperDraft, $175,000 in 2026 GAM and $175,000 in 2027 GAM.)	(Jamaica) Nicholas Simmonds^	Freshman	FW	Virginia	ACC	Richmond Kickers		(United States) FC Dallas
4	Sporting Kansas City	(Ghana) Kwaku Agyabeng^	Freshman	MF	Clemson	ACC	Cedar Stars		(United States) Sporting Kansas City
5	Orlando City (Note: LA Galaxy → Orlando City. Orlando City acquired the natural first-round pick in the 2026 MLS SuperDraft and $200,000 in 2025 GAM from LA Galaxy in exchange for a 2025 international roster slot.)	(United States) Harvey Sarajian	Sophomore	MF	Wake Forest	ACC	Florida West FC	Inter City FC	(United States) Orlando City
6	Colorado Rapids (Note: Toronto FC → Colorado Rapids. Colorado Rapids acquired the natural first-round pick as compensation for Toronto FC hiring Neil Emblen and Jase Kim.)	(Senegal) Mamadou Billo Diop	Sophomore	FW	—N/a	—N/a	Colorado Rapids	Colorado Rapids 2	(United States) Colorado Rapids 2
7	St. Louis City	(United States) Zack Lillington	Senior	DF	UC Davis	Big West	Marin FC	Marin FC Legends	(United States) St. Louis City 2
8	D.C. United (Note: New England Revolution → D.C. United. D.C. United acquired New England's pick.)	(United States) Richie Aman	Senior	FW	Washington	Big Ten	Seacoast United	Crossfire Redmond; Ballard FC	(United States) D.C. United
9	Orlando City (Note: Houston Dynamo → Orlando City. Orlando City acquired the natural first-round pick in the 2026 MLS SuperDraft from Houston Dynamo FC in exchange for Michael Halliday.)	(United States) Nolan Miller	Senior	DF	Michigan	Big Ten	Columbus Crew; Vardar FC	Flint City Bucks	(United States) Orlando City
10	Colorado Rapids	(Indonesia) Mitchell Baker	Sophomore	FW	Georgetown	Big East	Melbourne Victory; Black Rock	Black Rock	Georgetown
11	Houston Dynamo FC (Note: San Jose Earthquakes → Houston Dynamo. Houston Dynamo FC acquired San Jose's pick.)	(United States) Joe Highfield	Sophomore	FW	Portland	WCC	Minnesota Thunder	Minneapolis City	Portland
12	Atlanta United FC (Note: Atlanta United → FC Dallas → New York Red Bulls. Atlanta United FC acquired New York Red Bulls' pick via FC Dallas.)	(France) Enzo Dovlo	Junior	FW	UNC Greensboro	SoCon	Moulins Yzeure	Vermont Green	(United States) Atlanta United 2
13	Real Salt Lake	(Iceland) Lúkas Magnason	Sophomore	DF	Clemson	ACC	Breiðablik; KR	KR	Clemson
14	Orlando City	(Trinidad and Tobago) Jaylen Yearwood	Senior	DF	North Florida	ASUN	Gwinnett Soccer Academy	East Atlanta FC	(United States) Orlando City B
15	Portland Timbers	(United States) Justin McLean	Senior	FW	NC State	ACC	Atlanta United FC	Long Island Rough Riders	(United States) Portland Timbers 2
16	FC Dallas	(Germany) Niklas Herceg	Sophomore	GK	Vermont	Am. East	VfL 08 Vichttal	Vermont Green	Vermont
17	Vancouver Whitecaps FC (Note: Austin FC → Vancouver Whitecaps. Vancouver Whitecaps FC acquired the natural first-round pick in the 2026 MLS SuperDraft from Austin FC.)	(United States) Zach Ramsey	Sophomore	MF	Washington	Big Ten	Crossfire Redmond	Ballard FC	Washington
18	Chicago Fire FC	(United States) Jack Sandmeyer	Graduate	DF	North Carolina	ACC	Albion SC	City SC	(United States) Chicago Fire FC II
19	Sporting Kansas City (Note: Columbus Crew → Colorado Rapids → Sporting KC. Colorado Rapids acquired the natural first-round pick in the 2026 MLS SuperDraft and $200,000 in 2025 GAM from Columbus Crew in exchange for a 2025 international roster slot.)	(Canada) Nikos Clarke-Tosczak	Junior	DF	Portland	WCC	Edmonton West Warriors; Lugano; Vancouver Whitecaps FC		Portland
20	Orlando City (Note: Nashville SC → Orlando City. Orlando City acquired the natural first-round pick in the 2026 MLS SuperDraft and up to $100,000 in conditional GAM from Nashville SC in exchange for Thomas Williams.)	(Ghana) Issah Haruna	Sophomore	MF	UNC Greensboro	SoCon	Ghana Angels Soccer Academy	Asheville City	(United States) Orlando City B
21	New York Red Bulls (Note: Seattle Sounders → FC Dallas → New York Red Bulls. FC Dallas acquired the natural first-round pick in the 2026 MLS SuperDraft and up to $300,000 in conditional GAM from Seattle Sounders FC in exchange for Paul Arriola.)	(United States) Tomas Hut	Graduate	GK	Syracuse	ACC	MatchFit Academy	FC Motown STA	(United States) New York Red Bulls II
22	Charlotte FC	(United States) Will Cleary	Senior	MF	Stanford	ACC	—N/a	Hartford City	(United States) Charlotte FC
23	Minnesota United FC	(United States) Jaylinn Mitchell	Junior	FW	SMU	ACC	Slammers FC	AMSG FC	SMU
24	Los Angeles FC	(United States) Giuliano Fravolini Whitchurch	Senior	DF	Princeton	Ivy	Capelli Sport USA; Albion SC	West Chester United	(United States) Los Angeles FC 2
25	Real Salt Lake (Note: FC Cincinnati → Real Salt Lake. Real Salt Lake acquired the natural first-round pick in the 2026 MLS SuperDraft from FC Cincinnati in exchange for a loan of Dominik Marczuk and a 2025 International Roster Spot.)	(United States) Dylan Kropp	Senior	DF	North Carolina	ACC	Columbus Crew; Soccer Field Academy; Indiana Fire; Indy Eleven	Asheville City	(United States) Real Monarchs
26	Colorado Rapids (Note: Philadelphia Union → Colorado Rapids. Colorado Rapids acquired the natural first and third-round picks in the 2025 MLS SuperDraft and the natural first, second and third round in the 2026 and 2027 MLS SuperDrafts from Philadelphia Union in exchange for $125,000 in 2025 GAM, $125,000 in 2026 GAM, $100,000 in 2027 GAM and $250,000 in conditional GAM.)	(Ghana) Wahabu Musah	Sophomore	FW	Clemson	ACC	SIMA		
27	New York City FC	(Ghana) Ransford Gyan	Sophomore	FW	Clemson	ACC	Cedar Stars		Clemson
28	San Diego FC	(United States) Martin Luala	Junior	MF	Grand Canyon	WAC	Spartans FC AZ		Grand Canyon
29	Vancouver Whitecaps FC	(United States) Daniel Lugo	Sophomore	FW	High Point	Big South	Tampa Bay United	Tampa Bay United	High Point
30	Inter Miami	(United States) Abdel Talabi	Graduate	DF	Bryant	America East	New England Revolution	Boston Bolts	(United States) Monterey Bay FC

=== Second round ===
P	MLS team	Player	Year	Pos.	College	Conference	Academy team(s)	Other team(s)	Signed
31	D.C. United	(United States) Isaac Emojong	Junior	MF	Utah Valley	WAC	Sacramento United; Davis Legacy SC; Sacramento Republic; Barça Residency Academy	Davis Legacy SC	Portland
32	Inter Miami (Note: Atlanta United → Inter Miami. Inter Miami CF acquired the natural second-round pick in the 2026 MLS SuperDraft from Atlanta United FC.)	(United States) Kenan Hot	Senior	MF	Duke	ACC	PDA; New York Red Bulls; FC Motown; Hartford Athletic	Hartford Athletic; New York City FC II; Ocean City Nor'easters; FC Motown STA; Jackson United	(United States) Austin FC II
33	Real Salt Lake (Note: CF Montréal → Real Salt Lake. Real Salt Lake acquired the natural second-round pick in the 2026 MLS SuperDraft and $200,000 in 2025 GAM from CF Montréal in exchange for Bode Hidalgo.)	(United States) Tre Wright	Junior	DF	UCLA	Big Ten	Capital City SC	Ocean City Nor'easters	UCLA
34	Sporting Kansas City	(Uganda) Sadam Masereka	Senior	FW	Maryland	Big Ten	Buddo SSS	Nyamityobora; BUL Jinja FC; SC Villa	(United States) Colorado Springs Switchbacks
35	LA Galaxy	(United States) Palmer Bank	Junior	DF	Stanford	ACC	Ventura County Fusion	Ventura County Fusion	(United States) Ventura County FC
36	Toronto FC	(United States) Jackson Gilman	Senior	DF	Pittsburgh	ACC	YSC Academy; Philadelphia Union	Philadelphia Union DS; Philadelphia Union II	(Canada) Toronto FC II
37	St. Louis City	(United States) Andrew Samuels	Junior	GK	Princeton	Ivy	San Jose Earthquakes; De Anza Force	San Francisco Glens; San Francisco City	Princeton
38	New England Revolution	(Haiti) Schinieder Mimy	Graduate	DF	UCLA	Big Ten	AST	Flint City Bucks	(United States) New England Revolution II
39	Houston Dynamo FC	(South Africa) Calem Tommy	Senior	DF	NC State	ACC	Ubuntu Cape Town; Black Rock	North Carolina FC U23	(United States) Portland Timbers 2
40	FC Dallas (Note: Colorado Rapids → FC Dallas. FC Dallas acquired the natural second-round pick in the 2026 MLS SuperDraft from Colorado Rapids.)	(Belgium) Edouard Nys	Junior	MF	UIC	MVC	KV Kortrijk; KVK Westhoek	Duluth FC; Asheville City	(United States) North Texas SC
41	San Jose Earthquakes	(United States) Jack Jasinski	Senior	DF	Princeton	Ivy	Charlotte Soccer Academy; TOVO Academy; Philadelphia Union	Philadelphia Union II; West Chester United	(United States) San Jose Earthquakes
42	Real Salt Lake (Note: New York Red Bulls → Real Salt Lake. Real Salt Lake acquired Elias Manoel, all three natural picks in the 2025 MLS SuperDraft and the 2026 MLS SuperDraft natural second-round pick from New York Red Bulls in exchange for $550,000 in 2025 GAM and $150,000 in 2026 GAM.)	(El Salvador) Jefferson Amaya	Senior	MF	High Point	Big South	Charlotte Independence	Charlotte Independence; Charlotte Independence 2	(United States) Charlotte Independence
43	St. Louis City (Note: Real Salt Lake → Orlando City → St. Louis City. Orlando City acquired the natural second-round pick in the 2026 MLS SuperDraft, $50,000 in 2025 GAM and up to $150,000 in conditional GAM from Real Salt Lake in exchange for Mason Stajduhar.)	(United States) Cooper Forcellini	Senior	MF	Xavier	Big East	Sporting Blue Valley	Sunflower State FC	(United States) St. Louis City 2
44	FC Dallas (Note: Colorado Rapids → Sporting KC → Orlando City → FC Dallas. FC Dallas acquired the natural second-round pick in the 2026 MLS SuperDraft from Orlando City SC.)	(Italy) Umberto Pelà	Senior	MF	Virginia	ACC	Como	Lane United FC	(United States) North Texas SC
45	Portland Timbers	(Barbados) Colin Griffith	Senior	FW	Maryland	Big Ten	PDA		(United States) Portland Timbers 2
46	CF Montréal (Note: FC Dallas → CF Montréal. See Round 1: CF Montréal → FC Dallas.)	(United States) Aidan Godinho	Junior	MF	Georgetown	Big East	Orlando City; Florida Kraze Krush	Brooke House FC	Georgetown
47	Austin FC	(United States) Stefan Dobrijevic	Senior	FW	Akron	Big East	Internationals Academy	Akron City FC	(United States) Austin FC II
48	Real Salt Lake (Note: 'Chicago Fire → Real Salt Lake. Real Salt Lake acquired the natural second-round pick in the 2026 MLS SuperDraft from Chicago Fire FC.)	(Switzerland) Niklas Sörensen	Senior	DF	Pittsburgh	ACC	FC Thalwil; FC Zürich; TSG Hoffenheim	TSG Hoffenheim II	Pittsburgh
49	Columbus Crew	(United States) Tarun Karumanchi	Senior	MF	UCLA	Big Ten	San Jose Earthquakes	Asheville City	(United States) Columbus Crew 2
50	Nashville SC	(United States) Max Miller	Senior	DF	Kentucky	SBC	Lexington FC; FC Cincinnati	FC Cincinnati 2 Asheville City	
51	Seattle Sounders FC	(United States) Joe Dale	Junior	MF	Washington	Big Ten	Seattle United	Ballard FC	(United States) Tacoma Defiance
52	Charlotte FC	(United States) Luke Adams	Sophomore	DF	Tulsa	The American	FC Dallas		
53	Minnesota United FC	(United States) Bardia Hormozi	Junior	FW	Princeton	Ivy	Bethesda SC	Alexandria Reds	Princeton
54	Inter Miami (Note: LAFC → Inter Miami. Inter Miami acquired the natural second-round pick in the 2026 MLS SuperDraft and $50,000 in 2025 GAM from Los Angeles FC in exchange for Miami's natural first-round pick in 2025.)	(United States) Mamadi Jiana	Senior	FW	Bryant	America East	Boston Bolts	Western Mass Pioneers	(United States) Houston Dynamo 2
55	FC Cincinnati	(Libya) Ayoub Lajhar	Senior	DF	UConn	Big East	FC Stars 04	Vermont Green	(United States) FC Cincinnati 2
56	Colorado Rapids (Note: Philadelphia Union → Colorado Rapids. See Round 1: Philadelphia Union → Colorado Rapids.)	(United States) Asher Hestad	Sophomore	DF	Washington	Big Ten	Seattle United; Seattle Sounders FC	West Seattle Junction	Washington
57	New York City FC	(United States) Kevin Pierre Jr.	Senior	MF	Georgia Southern	SBC	SC Surf	Georgia Storm; Dothan United	(United States) New York City FC
58	San Diego FC	(Canada) Remi Agunbiade	Sophomore	FW	Akron	Big East	Vaughan Azzurri	Vaughan Azzurri; HFX Wanderers; Akron City FC	Akron
59	Vancouver Whitecaps FC	(Colombia) Yeider Zuluaga	Senior	MF	Seattle	WCC	PacNW	Midlakes United	(United States) Whitecaps FC 2
60	Inter Miami	(United States) Alex Barger	Junior	DF	Indiana	Big Ten	Sockers FC; Evolution SC	Sueño FC	Indiana

=== Third round ===
P	MLS team	Player	Year	Pos.	College	Conference	Academy team(s)	Other team(s)	Signed
61	D.C. United	(Cameroon) Stephane Njike	Sophomore	FW	Maryland	Big Ten	Offenburger FV	Offenburger FV; FC Denzlingen; FCSR Haguenau; Vermont Green	Indiana
62	Atlanta United FC	(United States) Noah James	Junior	MF	San Diego	WCC	SDSC Surf	Capo FC	
63	CF Montréal	(United States) Tate Lorentz	Junior	MF	Wake Forest	ACC	NC Fusion	Salem City FC	
64	Sporting Kansas City	(United States) Blake D'Agostino	Sophomore	FW	California Baptist	WAC	Real Colorado	Colorado Storm	
65	LA Galaxy	(United States) Sebastian Conlon	Senior	GK	Kentucky	SBC	D.C. United	Loudoun United; Mississippi Brilla	(United States) Ventura County
66	FC Dallas (Note: Toronto FC → CF Montréal → FC Dallas. CF Montréal acquired the natural third-round pick in the 2026 MLS SuperDraft and $75,000 in conditionl GAM from Toronto FC in exchange for the MLS rights to Malik Henry. For the subsequent trade to FC Dallas see Round 1: CF Montréal → FC Dallas)	(United States) Olayinka Ogunleye	Sophomore	DF	Louisville	ACC	Sockers FC	Sueño FC	Portland
67	Minnesota United FC (Note: St. Louis City → Minnesota United. Minnesota United FC acquired the natural third-round pick in the 2026 MLS SuperDraft from St. Louis City in exchange for a loan of Devin Padelford.)	(United States) Aiden Bengard	Freshman	DF	CSUF	Big West	Legends FC	AMSG FC; Long Beach FC	
68	New England Revolution	(United States) Kyle McGowan	Junior	FW	Denver	Summit	Portland Timbers	Flatirons FC	
69	Houston Dynamo FC	(Argentina) Agustin Resch	Senior	DF	Seton Hall	Big East	Argentinos Juniors	Ocean City Nor'easters; Asheville City	(United States) Houston Dynamo 2
70	Colorado Rapids	(United States) Koven Johnson	Sophomore	MF	High Point	Big South	Barça Residency Academy	Shady Side Academy; Arsenal FC of Pittsburgh	High Point
71	New York City FC (Note: San Jose Earthquakes → New York City FC. New York City FC acquired the natural third-round pick in the 2026 MLS SuperDraft from San Jose Earthquakes in exchange for Alfredo Morales.)	(United States) Joey Mueller	Junior	MF	UCF	SBC	Florida Elite		
72	LA Galaxy (Note: New York Red Bulls → LA Galaxy. LA Galaxy acquired the natural third-round pick in the 2026 MLS SuperDraft and up to $150,000 in conditional GAM from New York Red Bulls in exchange for John McCarthy.)	(Spain) Jaime Amaro	Sophomore	MF	Bryant	America East	Alcobendas; Canillas; Real Madrid; Fuenlabrada; Alcorcón	CD Móstoles URJC; Alcorcón B	
73	Real Salt Lake	(United States) Brayden Beason	Sophomore	FW	San Francisco	WCC	Dallas Roma	McKinney Chupacabras	
74	Orlando City	(United States) Mitch Ferguson	Senior	DF	Notre Dame	ACC	St. Louis Scott Gallagher; Sporting Kansas City; Portland Timbers	Portland Timbers 2 St. Charles FC	(United States) Sporting Kansas City II
75	Portland Timbers	(United States) Lucas Fernandez-Kim	Graduate	MF	Oregon State	Pac-12	Marin FC; East Bay United Bay Oaks	Davis Legacy SC	(United States) Portland Timbers 2
76	San Diego FC (Note: FC Dallas → San Diego FC. San Diego FC acquired the natural third-round pick in the 2026 MLS SuperDraft from FC Dallas in exchange for Jacob Jackson.)	(Grenada) Kyle Durham	Sophomore	GK	UConn	Big East	Central Brooklyn; Met Oval Academy		
77	Austin FC	(United States) Patrick Cayelli	Senior	MF	Pennsylvania	Ivy	CESA	Greenville Triumph; Tampa Bay United	(United States) Austin FC II
78	Houston Dynamo FC (Note: Chicago Fire → Houston Dynamo. Houston Dynamo FC acquired the natural third-round pick in the 2026 MLS SuperDraft from Chicago Fire FC in exchange for Chase Gasper.)	(United States) Austin Brummett	Senior	FW	UConn	Big East	Seacoast United Phantoms; Seattle Sounders FC	Tacoma Defiance; New York Red Bulls II; Ballard FC	(United States) Houston Dynamo 2
79	Columbus Crew	(United States) Isaac Heffess	Junior	DF	NC State	ACC	New England FC; Valeo FC; New England Surf	New England FC	(United States) Columbus Crew 2
80	Nashville SC	(Canada) Charles-Emile Brunet	Junior	MF	SMU	ACC	CS Longueuil	CS Longueuil	(United States) Nashville SC
81	Seattle Sounders FC	(United States) Stockton Short	Senior	GK	Utah Tech	WAC	La Roca; Utah Avalanche	Salt City SC; Ballard FC	
82	Charlotte FC	(Trinidad and Tobago) Jahiem Wickham	Senior	GK	USF	The American	Toronto FC	Vermont Green	(United States) Crown Legacy FC
83	Minnesota United FC	(United States) Michał Mroz	Sophomore	GK	Evansville	MVC	FC United	Panathinaikos Chicago	
84	Los Angeles FC	(United States) Iain Wagner	Sophomore	MF	San Diego	WCC	SDSC Surf	Capo FC	
85	D.C. United (Note: FC Cincinnati → D.C. United. D.C. United acquired the natural second-round pick in the 2026 MLS SuperDraft from FC Cincinnati.)	(Germany) Lasse Kelp	Senior	DF	Maryland	Big Ten	FC Köln; FC Hennef 05; Fortuna Köln	Utah United	(United States) Pittsburgh Riverhounds SC
86	Colorado Rapids (Note: Philadelphia Union → Colorado Rapids. See Round 1: Philadelphia Union → Colorado Rapids)	(United States) Jabari De Coteau	Junior	DF	Xavier	Big East	Brooklyn Italians; BW Gottschee	Manhattan SC	(United States) Colorado Rapids 2
87	New York City FC	(Germany) Luca Nikolai	Junior	DF	North Carolina	ACC	Borussia Mönchengladbach; MSV Duisburg	SpVg Schonnebeck 1910	North Carolina
88	Houston Dynamo FC (Note: San Diego FC → Houston Dynamo San Diego FC → Houston Dynamo)	(United States) Gilberto Rivera	Junior	MF	San Jose State	WAC	San Jose Earthquakes; De Anza Force; Siliscon Valley SA		(United States) Houston Dynamo 2
89	Vancouver Whitecaps FC	(United States) Connor Lofy	Sophomore	MF	Washington	Big Ten	Crossfire Premier	Crossfire Redmond; FC Olympia; Snohomish United	Washington
90	Inter Miami	(Germany) Maximilian Kissel	Senior	FW	Vermont	America East	VfB Ginsheim	VfB Ginsheim; Vermont Green	(United States) Portland Timbers 2

== Notable undrafted players ==
=== Homegrown players ===
This is a list of players who were draft eligible, but previously played on the Academy team of an MLS side, and were signed directly to the first team roster prior to the SuperDraft.

Original MLS team	Player	Position	College	Conference	Notes	Ref.
Houston Dynamo FC	(United States) Logan Erb	GK	NC State	ACC		
Houston Dynamo FC	(United States) Reese Miller	DF	Virginia	ACC		
New York City FC	(United States) Kamran Acito	DF	Duke	ACC		

== Summary ==
=== Selections by college athletic conference ===
Conference	Round 1	Round 2	Round 3	Total
NCAA Division I conferences
ACC	13	6	6	25
America East	2	1	2	5
American	0	1	1	2
ASUN	1	0	0	1
Big East	1	5	4	10
Big South	1	1	1	3
Big Ten	3	8	3	14
Big West	1	0	1	2
Ivy	1	3	1	5
MVC	0	1	1	2
Pac-12	0	0	1	1
SoCon	2	0	0	2
Summit	0	0	1	1
SBC	1	2	2	5
WAC	1	1	3	5
WCC	2	1	3	6

=== Schools with multiple draft selections ===
Selections	Schools
5	Washington
4	Clemson, Maryland, North Carolina, NC State, Princeton
3	Bryant, High Point, UCLA, UConn
2	Akron, Denver, Georgetown, Georgia Southern, Ohio State, Pittsburgh, Portland, San Diego, SMU, Stanford, UNC Greensboro, Vermont, Virginia, Wake Forest, Xavier
