= 2026 USL League Two season =

USL League Two
- Season: 2026
- Dates: May 3 – July 12 (regular season); July 13 – August 1 (playoffs)
- Teams: 158
- Champion: Vermont Green FC (2nd Title)
- Regular Season Champions: Minneapolis City SC (1st Title)
- Matches: 1,005
- Goals: 3,773 (3.75 per match)
- Best player: (United States) Nathan Donovan (Minneapolis City SC)
- Top goalscorer: (United States) Diego Robles (West Texas FC) (United States) Nathan Donovan (Minneapolis City SC) (16 Goals Each)
- Best goalkeeper: (United States) Sep Habibi (Colorado Storm)
- Biggest home win: Vermont Green FC 9–0 Albany Rush May 22; Vermont Green FC 10–1 Boston City FC June 20
- Biggest away win: Fort Worth Vaqueros FC 0–7 Texoma FC May 19; Lansing City Football 0–7 Kalamazoo FC June 11
- Highest scoring: AC Houston Sur 3–8 GFI Woodlands June 16; Vermont Green FC 10–1 Boston City FC June 20
- Longest winning run: Ocean City Nor'easters (May 22 – July 1); 12 games
- Longest unbeaten run: Vermont Green FC (May 16 – Present); Ocean City Nor'easters (May 22 – Present); 14 games
- Longest winless run: Boston City FC (May 9 – Present) Entire Season; Patuxent Football Athletics (May 20 – Present) Entire Season; 14 games
- Longest losing run: Patuxent Football Athletics (May 20 – Present) Entire Season; 14 games
- All statistics correct as of 21:08, July 11, 2026 (UTC).

The 2026 USL League Two season was the ongoing 31st season of USL League Two (USL2), a semi-professional soccer league in the United States. The league had 158 teams that are organized into the Central, Eastern, Southern, and Western conferences. The Southern Conference added the newly established Ranger Division. The conferences were split into 20 total divisions, ranging from 4 to 6 divisions in each conference, with 6 to 11 teams in each division.

The regular season ran from May 3 to July 12, with 12-14 matches for each team depending on the division. The playoffs were played from July 13 to August 1.

All USL2 matches during the regular season were broadcast on SportsEngine Play, an online streaming service operated by NBC Sports Group.

Vermont Green FC entered the season as the reigning playoff champions, while FC Motown entered as the regular season champions.

On July 9, U.S. Soccer announced that the 2026 Champions and six additional teams would qualify directly for the 2027 U.S. Open Cup.

== Team changes ==
=== New teams ===
- Appalachian FC
- Atlético Union
- Bethesda FC
- Connecticut Rush
- Eagle FC
- Edgewater Castle FC
- Fort Worth Vaqueros FC
- Hickory FC
- Hill City FC
- Jackson Boom
- Lakeland United FC
- Lorain County Leviathan FC
- Loudoun United FC 2
- Louisville City FC U23
- Lubbock Matadors SC
- Memphis FC
- Pennsylvania Classics
- Philadelphia Lone Star FC
- Pittsburgh Riverhounds 2
- Port City FC
- Real Colorado
- Rockford Raptors FC
- San Antonio FC 2
- Shark Coast FC
- Texoma FC (from USL1)
- West Texas FC

=== Departing teams ===
- Athens United FC
- Coachella SC
- Corpus Christi FC (to USL1)
- Fort Wayne FC (to USL1)
- Kings Hammer FC
- Kings Hammer Sun City
- Lane United FC
- Lexington SC
- Monterey Bay FC 2
- Sarasota Paradise (to USL1)
- St. Petersburg FC
- Tennessee SC

=== Moves ===
Central (Great Forest) to Central (Valley)

- Toledo Villa FC

Central (Great Lakes) to Central (Valley)

- Northern Indiana FC

Southern (Mid South) to Southern (Ranger)

- Denton Diablos FC
- McKinney Chupacabras FC

Southern (South Central) to Eastern (South Atlantic)

- Asheville City SC

Southern (Southeast) to Southern (South Florida)

- Brevard SC

=== Map ===
Locations of USL League Two franchises who are participating in the 2026 season.

Eastern Conference: Northeast Division Mid Atlantic Division Metropolitan Division Chesapeake Division South Atlantic Division
Central Conference: Great Forest Division Valley Division Great Lakes Division Heartland Division Great Plains Division
Southern Conference: South Central Division Southeast Division South Florida Division Mid South Division Lone Star Division Ranger Division
Western Conference: Mountain Division Northwest Division NorCal Division Southwest Division

Metro areas with multiple teams:

- Atlanta: Apotheos FC, East Atlanta FC, Swarm FC
- Austin: Hill Country Lobos, Lonestar SC
- Baltimore: Annapolis Blues FC, Christos FC
- Boston: Boston Bolts, Boston City FC, NEFC, Seacoast United Phantoms
- Charlotte: Charlotte Eagles, Charlotte Independence 2
- Chicago: Chicago City Dutch Lions FC, Edgewater Castle FC, River Light FC, Sueño FC
- Cleveland: Cleveland Force SC, Lorain County Leviathan FC
- Dallas-Fort Worth: Denton Diablos FC, Fort Worth Vaqueros FC, McKinney Chupacabras FC
- Denver: Colorado International Soccer Academy (CISA), Colorado Storm, Flatirons Rush SC, Real Colorado
- Detroit: AFC Ann Arbor, Oakland County FC, Union FC Macomb
- Hampton Roads: Lionsbridge FC, Virginia Beach United
- Houston: AC Houston Sur, AHFC Royals, Houston FC, GFI Woodlands
- Kansas City: Santafé Wanderers FC, Sunflower State FC
- Los Angeles: AMSG FC, Capo FC, Southern California Eagles
- Miami: Miami AC, FC Miami City, Fort Lauderdale United FC, Weston FC
- Minneapolis–Saint Paul: Minneapolis City SC, St. Croix Legends
- New York: AC Connecticut, Cedar Stars Rush, FC Motown, Ironbound SC, Long Island Rough Riders, Manhattan SC, Morris Elite SC, New Jersey Copa FC, Staten Island ASC, Westchester Flames
- Orlando: Brave SC, Brooke House FC, Nona FC
- Philadelphia: Delaware FC, Philadelphia Lone Star FC, West Chester United SC
- Pittsburgh: Pittsburgh Riverhounds FC 2, Steel City FC
- Raleigh: North Carolina FC U23, Wake FC
- San Francisco: Almaden FC, Marin FC Legends, Project 51O, San Francisco City FC, San Francisco Glens SC
- Seattle: Ballard FC, Bigfoot FC, Midlakes United, Snohomish United, Tacoma Stars, West Seattle Junction FC
- Washington: Bethesda SC, Loudoun United FC 2, Northern Virginia FC

== Standings ==
=== Eastern Conference ===
==== Northeast Division ====
Pos	Team	Pld	W	D	L	GF	GA	GD	Pts	PPG	Qualification
1	Vermont Green FC (Q)	14	13	1	0	64	12	+52	40	2.86	Advance to USL League Two Playoffs
2	NEFC (Q)	14	12	0	2	32	21	+11	36	2.57	Advance to playoff qualifying round
3	Western Mass Pioneers	14	8	3	3	27	20	+7	27	1.93	
4	Black Rock FC	14	5	6	3	22	17	+5	21	1.50	
5	Albany Rush	14	6	1	7	22	35	−13	19	1.36	
6	Boston Bolts	14	4	3	7	19	27	−8	15	1.07	
7	Seacoast United Phantoms	14	4	2	8	25	29	−4	14	1.00	
8	Connecticut Rush	14	4	2	8	19	26	−7	14	1.00	
9	AC Connecticut	14	3	0	11	18	29	−11	9	0.64	
10	Boston City FC	14	0	4	10	18	50	−32	4	0.29	

Updated to match(es) played on July 11, 2026. Source: USL
(Q) Qualified for the phase indicated

==== Mid Atlantic Division ====
Pos	Team	Pld	W	D	L	GF	GA	GD	Pts	PPG	Qualification
1	Ocean City Nor'easters (Q)	14	13	1	0	41	7	+34	40	2.86	Advance to USL League Two Playoffs
2	Lehigh Valley United (Q)	14	10	2	2	32	19	+13	32	2.29	Advance to playoff qualifying round
3	Reading United AC	14	5	4	5	28	24	+4	19	1.36	
4	Delaware FC	14	5	3	6	29	24	+5	18	1.29	
5	Real Central New Jersey	14	5	3	6	21	24	−3	18	1.29	
6	West Chester United SC	14	5	2	7	18	22	−4	17	1.21	
7	Pennsylvania Classics	14	4	3	7	23	36	−13	15	1.07	
8	Philadelphia Lone Star FC	14	4	2	8	25	34	−9	14	1.00	
9	Eagle FC	14	1	2	11	10	37	−27	5	0.36	

Updated to match(es) played on July 11, 2026. Source: USL
(Q) Qualified for the phase indicated

==== Metropolitan Division ====
Pos	Team	Pld	W	D	L	GF	GA	GD	Pts	PPG	Qualification
1	FC Motown STA (Q)	12	10	1	1	44	9	+35	31	2.58	Advance to USL League Two Playoffs
2	Ironbound SC (Q)	12	8	4	0	27	14	+13	28	2.33	Advance to playoff qualifying round
3	Long Island Rough Riders	12	7	3	2	31	12	+19	24	2.00	
4	Cedar Stars Rush	12	5	4	3	19	18	+1	19	1.58	
5	Hudson Valley Hammers	12	5	3	4	27	27	0	18	1.50	
6	Manhattan SC	12	4	4	4	30	24	+6	16	1.33	
7	New Jersey Copa FC	12	3	1	8	16	32	−16	10	0.83	
8	Staten Island Athletic SC	12	2	2	8	16	31	−15	8	0.67	
9	Morris Elite SC	12	2	2	8	12	35	−23	8	0.67	
10	Westchester Flames	12	1	2	9	15	35	−20	5	0.42	

Updated to match(es) played on July 11, 2026. Source: USL
(Q) Qualified for the phase indicated

==== Chesapeake Division ====
Pos	Team	Pld	W	D	L	GF	GA	GD	Pts	PPG	Qualification
1	Lionsbridge FC (Q)	14	11	1	2	47	14	+33	34	2.43	Advance to USL League Two Playoffs
2	Virginia Beach United (Q)	14	8	3	3	32	17	+15	27	1.93	Advance to playoff qualifying round
3	Charlottesville Blues FC	14	8	2	4	25	14	+11	26	1.86	
4	Loudoun United FC 2	14	8	1	5	36	31	+5	25	1.79	
5	Annapolis Blues FC	14	7	2	5	36	20	+16	23	1.64	
6	Bethesda FC	14	7	2	5	31	31	0	23	1.64	
7	Christos FC	14	7	2	5	28	36	−8	23	1.64	
8	Hill City FC	14	7	0	7	33	27	+6	21	1.50	
9	Northern Virginia FC	14	5	3	6	40	27	+13	18	1.29	
10	Virginia Marauders FC	14	1	0	13	7	45	−38	3	0.21	
11	Patuxent Football Athletics	14	0	0	14	4	57	−53	0	0.00	

Updated to match(es) played on July 11, 2026. Source: USL
(Q) Qualified for the phase indicated

==== South Atlantic Division ====
Pos	Team	Pld	W	D	L	GF	GA	GD	Pts	PPG	Qualification
1	Charlotte Independence 2 (Q)	14	11	2	1	32	9	+23	35	2.50	Advance to USL League Two Playoffs
2	Asheville City SC (Q)	14	8	5	1	25	8	+17	29	2.07	Advance to playoff qualifying round
3	Appalachian FC (Q)	14	8	4	2	30	13	+17	28	2.00	Advance to playoff qualifying round
4	Hickory FC	14	9	1	4	28	15	+13	28	2.00	
5	SC United FC	14	5	3	6	23	27	−4	18	1.29	
6	Charlotte Eagles	14	5	3	6	22	24	−2	18	1.29	
7	Salem City FC	14	5	2	7	24	29	−5	17	1.21	
8	North Carolina FC U23	14	5	2	7	23	31	−8	17	1.21	
9	Tobacco Road FC	14	3	3	8	26	34	−8	12	0.86	
10	Wake FC	14	3	0	11	16	39	−23	9	0.64	
11	Port City FC	14	2	1	11	14	34	−20	7	0.50	

Updated to match(es) played on July 11, 2026. Source: USL
(Q) Qualified for the phase indicated

=== Central Conference ===
==== Great Forest Division ====
Pos	Team	Pld	W	D	L	GF	GA	GD	Pts	PPG	Qualification
1	Steel City FC (Q)	12	9	3	0	20	3	+17	30	2.50	Advance to USL League Two Playoffs
2	FC Buffalo (Q)	12	7	3	2	34	14	+20	24	2.00	Advance to USL League Two Playoffs
3	Pittsburgh Riverhounds 2	12	6	2	4	23	18	+5	20	1.67	
4	Akron City FC	12	6	1	5	28	17	+11	19	1.58	
5	Lorain County Leviathan FC	12	6	1	5	27	20	+7	19	1.58	
6	Cleveland Force SC	12	3	0	9	21	40	−19	9	0.75	
7	Erie Sports Center FC	12	0	0	12	7	48	−41	0	0.00	

Updated to match(es) played on July 11, 2026. Source: USL
(Q) Qualified for the phase indicated

==== Great Lakes Division ====
Pos	Team	Pld	W	D	L	GF	GA	GD	Pts	PPG	Qualification
1	Flint City Bucks (Q)	12	10	1	1	38	13	+25	31	2.58	Advance to USL League Two Playoffs
2	Oakland County FC	12	6	2	4	27	18	+9	20	1.67	
3	Midwest United FC	12	6	1	5	27	16	+11	19	1.58	
4	Kalamazoo FC	12	6	1	5	30	22	+8	19	1.58	
5	AFC Ann Arbor	12	6	1	5	23	27	−4	19	1.58	
6	Union FC Macomb	12	2	2	8	19	37	−18	8	0.67	
7	Lansing City Football	12	2	0	10	13	44	−31	6	0.50	

Updated to match(es) played on July 11, 2026. Source: USL
(Q) Qualified for the phase indicated

==== Great Plains Division ====
Pos	Team	Pld	W	D	L	GF	GA	GD	Pts	PPG	Qualification
1	Peoria City (Q)	12	10	1	1	32	13	+19	31	2.58	Advance to USL League Two Playoffs
2	Santafé Wanderers	12	7	2	3	31	16	+15	23	1.92	
3	Des Moines Menace	12	5	1	6	20	21	−1	16	1.33	
4	FC Ambush	12	4	2	6	17	20	−3	14	1.17	
5	Sunflower State FC	12	4	0	8	17	31	−14	12	1.00	
6	Springfield FC	12	2	2	8	20	36	−16	8	0.67	

Updated to match(es) played on July 11, 2026. Source: USL
(Q) Qualified for the phase indicated

==== Heartland Division ====
Pos	Team	Pld	W	D	L	GF	GA	GD	Pts	PPG	Qualification
1	Minneapolis City SC (Q, R)	12	12	0	0	46	6	+40	36	3.00	Advance to USL League Two Playoffs
2	Sueño FC (Q)	12	8	1	3	41	13	+28	25	2.08	Advance to USL League Two Playoffs
3	Chicago City Dutch Lions	12	6	1	5	25	25	0	19	1.58	
4	St. Croix Legends	12	6	0	6	26	25	+1	18	1.50	
5	Rockford Raptors FC	12	6	0	6	19	25	−6	18	1.50	
6	RKC Third Coast	12	5	1	6	19	19	0	16	1.33	
7	River Light FC	12	4	3	5	27	25	+2	15	1.25	
8	Edgewater Castle FC	12	2	0	10	15	45	−30	6	0.50	
9	Rochester FC	12	2	0	10	8	43	−35	6	0.50	

Updated to match(es) played on July 12, 2026. Source: USL
(Q) Qualified for the phase indicated; (R) Regular Season Champions

==== Valley Division ====
Pos	Team	Pld	W	D	L	GF	GA	GD	Pts	PPG	Qualification
1	West Virginia United (Q)	12	9	1	2	22	12	+10	28	2.33	Advance to USL League Two Playoffs
2	Northern Indiana FC (Q)	12	8	0	4	23	17	+6	24	2.00	Advance to USL League Two Playoffs
3	Louisville City FC U23	12	6	1	5	21	16	+5	19	1.58	
4	Kings Hammer FC Columbus	12	6	0	6	20	17	+3	18	1.50	
5	Dayton Dutch Lions	12	4	1	7	15	22	−7	13	1.08	
6	Toledo Villa FC	12	1	1	10	14	31	−17	4	0.33	

Updated to match(es) played on July 12, 2026. Source: USL
(Q) Qualified for the phase indicated

=== Southern Conference ===
==== South Central Division ====
Pos	Team	Pld	W	D	L	GF	GA	GD	Pts	PPG	Qualification
1	Dothan United Dragons (Q)	12	9	2	1	27	8	+19	29	2.42	Advance to USL League Two Playoffs
2	Swarm FC (Q)	12	7	5	0	34	14	+20	26	2.17	Advance to USL League Two Playoffs
3	Columbus United FC	12	4	6	2	19	20	−1	18	1.50	
4	Birmingham Legion 2	12	2	5	5	16	26	−10	11	0.92	
5	Montgomery United FC	12	2	4	6	18	24	−6	10	0.83	
6	East Atlanta Dutch Lions	12	2	3	7	20	29	−9	9	0.75	
7	Apotheos FC	12	2	3	7	11	24	−13	9	0.75	

Updated to match(es) played on July 11, 2026. Source: USL
(Q) Qualified for the phase indicated

==== Southeast Division ====
Pos	Team	Pld	W	D	L	GF	GA	GD	Pts	PPG	Qualification
1	Brave SC (Q)	12	7	4	1	27	13	+14	25	2.08	Advance to USL League Two Playoffs
2	Nona FC	12	4	5	3	22	14	+8	17	1.42	
3	Inter Gainesville KF	12	4	3	5	18	20	−2	15	1.25	
4	Brooke House FC	12	3	4	5	17	25	−8	13	1.08	
5	Shark Coast FC	12	2	6	4	19	25	−6	12	1.00	
6	Sporting Club Jacksonville	12	2	6	4	6	12	−6	12	1.00	

Updated to match(es) played on July 12, 2026. Source: USL
(Q) Qualified for the phase indicated

==== South Florida Division ====
Pos	Team	Pld	W	D	L	GF	GA	GD	Pts	PPG	Qualification
1	Fort Lauderdale United FC (Q)	12	10	1	1	22	4	+18	31	2.58	Advance to USL League Two Playoffs
2	Lakeland United FC	12	7	1	4	22	15	+7	22	1.83	
3	Miami AC	12	5	3	4	19	20	−1	18	1.50	
4	Weston FC	12	5	2	5	23	19	+4	17	1.42	
5	Brevard SC	12	2	2	8	22	33	−11	8	0.67	
6	FC Miami City	12	1	3	8	13	30	−17	6	0.50	

Updated to match(es) played on July 12, 2026. Source: USL
(Q) Qualified for the phase indicated

==== Mid South Division ====
Pos	Team	Pld	W	D	L	GF	GA	GD	Pts	PPG	Qualification
1	Little Rock Rangers (Q)	12	10	2	0	22	6	+16	32	2.67	Advance to USL League Two Playoffs
2	Louisiana Krewe FC	12	7	1	4	27	20	+7	22	1.83	
3	Mississippi Brilla	12	6	3	3	32	20	+12	21	1.75	
4	Hattiesburg FC	12	4	4	4	26	22	+4	16	1.33	
5	Red River FC	12	4	3	5	23	22	+1	15	1.25	
6	Memphis FC	12	3	3	6	18	24	−6	12	1.00	
7	Jackson Boom	12	0	0	12	4	38	−34	0	0.00	

Updated to match(es) played on July 11, 2026. Source: USL
(Q) Qualified for the phase indicated

==== Lone Star Division ====
Pos	Team	Pld	W	D	L	GF	GA	GD	Pts	PPG	Qualification
1	Laredo Heat (Q)	12	10	2	0	32	6	+26	32	2.67	Advance to USL League Two Playoffs
2	GFI Woodlands (Q)	12	7	3	2	33	20	+13	24	2.00	Advance to USL League Two Playoffs
3	AHFC Royals	12	5	5	2	31	16	+15	20	1.67	
4	Lonestar SC	12	5	5	2	25	22	+3	20	1.67	
5	San Antonio FC 2	12	5	3	4	24	26	−2	18	1.50	
6	Houston FC	12	4	4	4	27	27	0	16	1.33	
7	Hill Country Lobos	12	2	3	7	23	35	−12	9	0.75	
8	Twin City Toucans FC	12	2	2	8	14	24	−10	8	0.67	
9	AC Houston Sur	12	0	1	11	10	43	−33	1	0.08	

Updated to match(es) played on July 11, 2026. Source: USL
(Q) Qualified for the phase indicated

==== Ranger Division ====
Pos	Team	Pld	W	D	L	GF	GA	GD	Pts	PPG	Qualification
1	Texoma FC (Q)	12	9	0	3	28	12	+16	27	2.25	Advance to USL League Two Playoffs
2	Denton Diablos FC	12	8	1	3	26	18	+8	25	2.08	
3	McKinney Chupacabras FC	12	7	2	3	23	15	+8	23	1.92	
4	West Texas FC	12	5	3	4	26	19	+7	18	1.50	
5	Lubbock Matadors SC	12	3	2	7	14	16	−2	11	0.92	
6	Fort Worth Vaqueros FC	12	0	0	12	4	41	−37	0	0.00	

Updated to match(es) played on July 11, 2026. Source: USL
(Q) Qualified for the phase indicated

=== Western Conference ===
==== Mountain Division ====
Pos	Team	Pld	W	D	L	GF	GA	GD	Pts	PPG	Qualification
1	Colorado Storm (Q)	12	11	1	0	32	3	+29	34	2.83	Advance to USL League Two Playoffs
2	Utah United (Q)	12	8	3	1	32	10	+22	27	2.25	Advance to USL League Two Playoffs
3	Albion SC Colorado	12	7	2	3	26	20	+6	23	1.92	
4	Real Colorado	12	4	2	6	24	31	−7	14	1.17	
5	Atletico Union	12	3	3	6	19	21	−2	12	1.00	
6	CISA	12	1	3	8	20	47	−27	6	0.50	
7	Flatirons SC	12	0	2	10	13	34	−21	2	0.17	

Updated to match(es) played on July 11, 2026. Source: USL
(Q) Qualified for the phase indicated

==== Northwest Division ====
Pos	Team	Pld	W	D	L	GF	GA	GD	Pts	PPG	Qualification
1	Ballard FC (Q)	14	12	1	1	42	10	+32	37	2.64	Advance to USL League Two Playoffs
2	Snohomish United (Q)	14	11	1	2	39	18	+21	34	2.43	Advance to USL League Two Playoffs
3	Portland Bangers FC	14	9	0	5	22	20	+2	27	1.93	
4	Midlakes United	14	5	1	8	24	25	−1	16	1.14	
5	Tacoma Stars FC	14	4	3	7	25	34	−9	15	1.07	
6	West Seattle Junction FC	14	4	2	8	29	30	−1	14	1.00	
7	FC Olympia	14	3	1	10	18	37	−19	10	0.71	
8	Bigfoot FC	14	2	3	9	18	43	−25	9	0.64	

Updated to match(es) played on July 12, 2026. Source: USL
(Q) Qualified for the phase indicated

==== Nor Cal Division ====
Pos	Team	Pld	W	D	L	GF	GA	GD	Pts	PPG	Qualification
1	San Francisco City FC (Q)	14	12	1	1	43	17	+26	37	2.64	Advance to USL League Two Playoffs
2	Project 51O (Q)	14	10	1	3	38	18	+20	31	2.21	Advance to USL League Two Playoffs
3	Almaden FC	14	9	2	3	32	12	+20	29	2.07	
4	San Francisco Glens SC	14	5	2	7	14	19	−5	17	1.21	
5	Academica SC	14	4	3	7	28	36	−8	15	1.07	
6	San Juan SC	14	3	3	8	21	35	−14	12	0.86	
7	Davis Legacy SC	14	2	3	9	20	39	−19	9	0.64	
8	Marin FC Legends	14	2	3	9	25	45	−20	9	0.64	

Updated to match(es) played on July 12, 2026. Source: USL
(Q) Qualified for the phase indicated

==== Southwest Division ====
Pos	Team	Pld	W	D	L	GF	GA	GD	Pts	PPG	Qualification
1	Ventura County Fusion (Q)	12	8	4	0	34	10	+24	28	2.33	Advance to USL League Two Playoffs
2	FC Tucson (Q)	12	6	4	2	19	11	+8	22	1.83	Advance to USL League Two Playoffs
3	Redlands FC	12	6	4	2	25	14	+11	22	1.83	
4	Capo FC	12	5	3	4	28	27	+1	18	1.50	
5	Stars FC	12	4	4	4	22	22	0	16	1.33	
6	City SC	12	5	0	7	23	27	−4	15	1.25	
7	Southern California Eagles	12	3	2	7	16	28	−12	11	0.92	
8	AMSG FC	12	0	1	11	11	39	−28	1	0.08	

Updated to match(es) played on July 11, 2026. Source: USL
(Q) Qualified for the phase indicated

== Playoffs ==
The 2026 USL League Two Playoffs featured 35 teams: all 20 division winners and 15 additional teams that were runners-up or third-place teams from pre-selected divisions. The single-elimination tournament began on July 13, and the league final took place on August 1.

=== Bracket ===
Conference Quarterfinals	Conference Semifinals
Ocean City Nor'easters	2
FC Motown STA	0
Ocean City Nor'easters	0
Vermont Green FC*	4
Vermont Green FC*	4
Ironbound SC	0
Eastern Conference
Charlotte Independence 2	0
Appalachian FC	2
Appalachian FC	2
Asheville City SC	4
Lionsbridge FC*	2
Asheville City SC	3 (AET)
Fort Lauderdale United FC	4
Swarm FC	0
Fort Lauderdale United FC	3
Brave SC	0
Dothan United*	0
Brave SC	1
Southern Conference
Little Rock Rangers	1
GFI Academy	2
GFI Academy	1
Laredo Heat SC*	6
Laredo Heat SC*	2
Texoma FC	0
Minneapolis City SC	2
West Virginia United	0
Minneapolis City SC	0
Peoria City*	4
Peoria City*	3
Sueno FC	2
Central Conference
Steel City FC	1
Northern Indiana FC	0
Steel City FC	1
Flint City Bucks*	2
Flint City Bucks*	2
FC Buffalo	0
Colorado Storm	2
Snohomish United	1
Colorado Storm	3
Ballard FC*	4
Ballard FC*	1 (4)
Utah United	1 (2)
Western Conference
Ventura County Fusion	1
Project 51O	0
Ventura County Fusion	6
San Francisco City FC*	1
San Francisco City FC*	1
FC Tucson	0

Conference Finals
Vermont Green FC	4
Asheville City SC	0
Fort Lauderdale United FC	1 (2)
Laredo Heat SC*	1 (3)
Peoria City	0
Flint City Bucks*	4
Ballard FC	1
Ventura County Fusion	2

National Semifinals
Vermont Green FC	7
Laredo Heat SC*	1
Flint City Bucks*	1
Ventura County Fusion	0

National Final
Vermont Green FC	2
Flint City Bucks	1

=== Eastern Conference Qualifying Round ===
July 14 First Round	Asheville City SC	1–0	Virginia Beach United	Asheville, North Carolina
7:00 PM ET	Bilow 50' (pen.) (yellow card) 81'; Reynolds (yellow card) 58'	Report	Kilosho (yellow card) 33'; Moody (yellow card) 54' (yellow-red card) 81'; Mills (yellow card) 81'	Stadium: Greenwood Field; Referee: Todd Adkison

July 14 First Round	LVU Rush	0–1	Appalachian FC	Allentown, Pennsylvania
7:00 PM ET	Salivonchik (yellow card) 56'; Garces (yellow card) 68'	Report	Becerra (yellow card) 84'; Gerak 90+2'	Stadium: Scotty Wood Stadium; Referee: John Baldassari

July 14 First Round	NEFC	0–3	Ironbound SC	Lynnfield, Massachusetts
8:30 PM ET	Goglia (yellow card) 25'; Burkhardt (yellow card) 70'; Fernandez (yellow card) 80'	Report	Marciniak 6'; Tavares (yellow card) 45'; Agostinho 51' (yellow card) 85'; Rodrigues (yellow card) 66'; Grenha 70'; Davis (yellow card) 78'	Stadium: Lynnfield High School; Referee: Danielle Cornetta

=== Eastern Conference ===
July 17 Conference Quarterfinals	Charlotte Independence 2	0–2	Appalachian FC	Newport News, Virginia
12:00 PM ET	Bullard (yellow card) 45'; Roberts (yellow card) 90'	Report	Douglas 20'; Berko (yellow card) 30'; Becerra (yellow card) 71'; Honcoop 72'	Stadium: TowneBank Stadium; Referee: Killian Arnold

July 17 Conference Quarterfinals	Ocean City Nor'easters	2–0	FC Motown STA	Burlington, Vermont
4:00 PM ET	Hoffman 16'; Roskos 80'; Pompliano (yellow card) 85'	Report	Bray (yellow card) 81'; Ruiz (yellow card) 83'; Hope (yellow card) 90'; Vaubel (red card) 90'	Stadium: Virtue Field; Referee: Victor Borges

July 17 Conference Quarterfinals	Vermont Green FC	4–0	Ironbound SC	Burlington, Vermont
7:00 PM ET	Francou 8'; Millar 23'; Rosas 31'; Linberg (yellow card) 51'; Ajagbe 71'; Marshall (yellow card) 87'	Report	Tavares (yellow card) 55'; Wilk (yellow card) 85'	Stadium: Virtue Field; Attendance: 2,700; Referee: Fabio Cardoso

July 17 Conference Quarterfinals	Lionsbridge FC	2–3 (a.e.t.)	Asheville City SC	Newport News, Virginia
7:30 PM ET	Ortiz 30'; Hatley 31'; Hollenbach (yellow card) 65'; Matthews (yellow card) 90'; Baker (yellow card) 90+7'; Boomkens (yellow card) 118'		McDaid 8'; Jeffcott (yellow card) 41'; Picksley 53'; Renz (yellow card) 75'; Trimnal 120+' (yellow card) 120+'	Stadium: TowneBank Stadium; Referee: Muhammad (Mo) Coovadia

July 19 Conference Semifinals	Vermont Green FC	4–0	Ocean City Nor'easters	Burlington, Vermont
7:00 PM ET	Picotto 15'; O'Neil 43'; Zellefrow 45+1'; Rosas 57'; Miller (yellow card) 75'	Report	Hoffmann (yellow card) 28'; Holt (yellow card) 33'	Stadium: Virtue Field; Attendance: 2,700; Referee: Mukhtar Abdulahi

July 19 Conference Semifinals	Asheville City SC	4–2	Appalachian FC	Newport News, Virginia
7:30 PM ET	Picksley 11', 69'; Brizuela 32'; Carlson 41'; Mcdaid (yellow card) 45'; Diop (yellow card) 56'; Holtz (yellow card) 62'	Report	Haesler (yellow card) 22'; Douglas (yellow card) 39'; Becerra (yellow card) 44'; Honcoop 54'; Gerak 59'	Stadium: TowneBank Stadium; Referee: Cade Brashear

July 24 Conference Final	Vermont Green FC	4–0	Asheville City SC	Laredo, Texas
6:30 PM ET	Francou 3'; McHenry 8'; O'Neil 39'; Miller (yellow card) 45'; Clarke-Tosczak (yellow card) 66'; Di Blasio 88'	Report	Picksley (yellow card) 63'; Wicks (red card) 85'	Stadium: PEG Energy Stadium; Attendance: 100; Referee: Paul Clark

=== Southern Conference ===
July 16 Conference Quarterfinals	Fort Lauderdale United FC	4–0	Swarm FC	Dothan, Alabama
4:00 PM ET	Appiah 5'; Betina 53'; Barnett 68'; Lacey 90+3'	Report	Abdi (yellow card) 5'; Fensome (yellow card) 45'; Adewoju (yellow card) 50'; Muntane (yellow card) 68'; Orzechowski (yellow card) 84'; Yaxye (yellow card) 90+3'; Green (yellow card) 90+5'	Stadium: Rip Hewes Stadium; Referee: Ethan Wilson

July 16 Conference Quarterfinals	Little Rock Rangers	1–2	GFI Academy	Laredo, Texas
6:00 PM ET	Hardin 40' (yellow card) 84'; Losfablos (yellow card) 42'; Fagan (yellow card) 90+7'; Otero (yellow card) 90+7'	Report	Gedek 1', 24'; Ojeda (yellow card) 45+4'; Lopes (yellow card) 90+4'	Stadium: PEG Energy Stadium; Referee: Alfonso Jauregui

July 16 Conference Quarterfinals	Dothan United	0–1	Brave SC	Dothan, Alabama
8:30 PM ET	Clapier (yellow card) 43'; Hallenberger (yellow card) 68'; Ouedraogo Jr. (yellow card) 90'; Vallejo (yellow card) 90'; Darub (red card) 90'	Report	Ramos (yellow card) 16'; Silva (yellow card) 22'; Ribeiro (yellow card) 44'; Ishii 45+3'; Moumban (yellow card) 89'; Lopes (red card) 89'	Stadium: Rip Hewes Stadium; Referee: Dan Benson

July 16 Conference Quarterfinals	Laredo Heat SC	2–0	Texoma FC	Laredo, Texas
9:15 PM ET	Tavares (yellow card) 38'; Romero 52' (yellow card) 86'; Escobar 59'	Report	O'toole (yellow card) 43'	Stadium: PEG Energy Stadium; Attendance: 1,200; Referee: Mariano Magallanes

July 18 Conference Semifinals	Fort Lauderdale United FC	3–0	Brave SC	Dothan, Alabama
8:00 PM ET	Barnett 37'; Appiah 48', 55'	Report	Ocampos (yellow card) 27'; Ribeiro (yellow card) 32'	Stadium: Rip Hewes Stadium; Referee: Dorian Del Toro

July 18 Conference Semifinals	Laredo Heat SC	6–1	GFI Academy	Laredo, Texas
9:00 PM ET	Escobar 7' (pen.), 52', 63'; Endo 45+2'; Esquivel (yellow card) 45+2'; Sylejmani 79'; Munoz 89'; Madrid (yellow card) 90'	Report	Resano 25' (pen.) (yellow card) 71'; Moros (yellow card) 66'; Leza (yellow card) 71'; Garcia (red card) 77'; Carvalho (yellow card) 84'	Stadium: PEG Energy Stadium; Referee: Eric Aplis

July 24 Conference Final	Laredo Heat SC	1–1 (a.e.t.) (3–2 p)	Fort Lauderdale United FC	Laredo, Texas
9:00 PM ET	Tavares (yellow card) 50'; Knutson (yellow card) 88' (yellow-red card) 108' (goal) 108'; Romero (yellow card) 90'	Report	Boccuzzo (yellow card) 37'; Gargiulo (yellow card) 49'; Leyva (red card) 112'; Coronado 119'	Stadium: PEG Energy Stadium; Attendance: 1,200; Referee: Paul Clark
	Penalties
	Zamora (penalty scored); Romero (penalty scored); Jung (penalty missed); Escobar (penalty missed); Villanueva (penalty scored)		(penalty scored) Cubeddu; (penalty missed) Frame; (penalty missed) Belgrove; (penalty missed) Betina; (penalty scored) Lacey

=== Central Conference ===
July 16 Conference Quarterfinals	Minneapolis City SC	2–0	West Virginia United	Peoria, Illinois
3:00 PM ET	Morgan 37' (pen.); Donovan 41'; Obilo (yellow card) 45+1'; Moreno (yellow card) 56'; Nyembwe (yellow card) 85'	Report	Neto (yellow card) 90+6'	Stadium: Shea Stadium; Referee: Martin Dahlquist

July 16 Conference Quarterfinals	Peoria City	3–2	Sueno FC	Peoria, Illinois
7:30 PM ET	Rivera 20'; Koulai (yellow card) 32'; Kipnusu 63'; Sesay (yellow card) 76'; Onentia 85'; Gomez (yellow card) 87'; Aremeyaw (yellow card) 90'	Report	Vilet (yellow card) 24' (red card) 62'; Van Heukelum 33'; Norkett 50'; Bogard (yellow card) 66'; Zachemski (yellow card) 76'; Lindh (yellow card) 90'; Barger (yellow card) 90'	Stadium: Shea Stadium; Referee: Alireza Lotfi

July 17 Conference Quarterfinals	Steel City FC	1–0	Northern Indiana FC	Brighton, Michigan
4:00 PM ET	Territo (yellow card) 54'; Nissen-lie 63'	Report	Diaz (yellow card) 82'	Stadium: Legacy Sports Complex; Referee: Meghan Brasseur

July 17 Conference Quarterfinals	Flint City Bucks	2–0	FC Buffalo	Brighton, Michigan
7:30 PM ET	Agunbiade 43'; Zomeno 63'; Njike (yellow card) 86'	Report	Jansen (yellow card) 44'; Jell (yellow card) 59'; Leiva (yellow card) 65'; Dade (yellow card) 65'; Franke (red card) 86'	Stadium: Legacy Sports Complex; Attendance: 1,510; Referee: Logan Allio

July 18 Conference Semifinals	Peoria City	4–0	Minneapolis City SC	Peoria, Illinois
8:30 PM ET	Koulai 12', 42'; Arroyo (yellow card) 21'; Gomez (yellow card) 51' (goal) 67'; Kipnusu 90+4' (pen.)	Report	Banks (yellow card) 77'; Murray-Powell (red card) 88'	Stadium: Shea Stadium

July 19 Conference Semifinals	Flint City Bucks	2–1	Steel City FC	Flint, Michigan
7:30 PM ET	Moller-Jensen 30'; Paiva (yellow card) 41'; Lopez 76'; Foster (yellow card) 84'	Report	Prex 88'; Apostolides (yellow card) 90'	Stadium: Atwood Stadium; Referee: Scott Fleming

July 24 Conference Final	Flint City Bucks	4–0	Peoria City	Flint, Michigan
7:30 PM ET	Kasanzu 11' (o.g.); Roman (yellow card) 17'; Paiva (yellow card) 21'; Agunbiade 47'; Shillington 62'; Zomeño (yellow card) 77'; Njike (yellow card) 87'; Lopez 90+1'	Report	Karmbor (yellow card) 54'; Koulai (yellow card) 63'; Kipnusu (yellow card) 64'; El Yansli (yellow card) 82'; Saygbe (yellow card) 85'	Stadium: Atwood Stadium; Referee: Sriram Balaji

=== Western Conference ===
July 17 Conference Quarterfinals	Colorado Storm	2–1	Snohomish United	Seattle, Washington
5:00 PM ET	Michael 29'; Schoemehl (yellow card) 40'; Shepherd 62'	Report	Robins 10'; Rangel (yellow card) 41'; Silvetti (yellow card) 90'	Stadium: Interbay Stadium; Referee: Matthew Connolly

July 17 Conference Quarterfinals	Ventura County Fusion	1–0	Project 51O	San Francisco, California
7:30 PM ET	Lewis (yellow card) 45'; Thanhofer 78'	Report	Stone (yellow card) 72'; Vera (yellow card) 74'	Stadium: Kezar Stadium; Referee: Edson Angeles

July 17 Conference Quarterfinals	Ballard FC	1–1 (a.e.t.) (4–2 p)	Utah United	Seattle, Washington
10:00 PM ET	Schelb 120+1' (yellow card) 120+'	Report	Ulrich (yellow card) 53' (red card) 120+'; Golesis 120+6' (yellow card) 120+'; A. Fritcher (yellow card) 120+'; J. Fritcher (yellow card) 120+'; Pascual (yellow card) 120+'	Stadium: Interbay Stadium; Referee: Will Enger
	Penalties
	Schelb (penalty scored); Jeremiah (penalty scored); Rodriguez (penalty scored); Sent (penalty missed); Mendez (penalty scored)		(penalty missed) Lifferth; (penalty scored) Tita; (penalty scored) Guadarrama; (penalty missed) J. Fritcher

July 17 Conference Quarterfinals	San Francisco City FC	1–0	FC Tucson	San Francisco, California
10:30 PM ET	Rosas 49'	Report		Stadium: Kezar Stadium; Referee: Juan Aguirre

July 19 Conference Semifinals	San Francisco City FC	1–6	Ventura County Fusion	San Francisco, California
7:30 PM ET	Tsunehara (yellow card) 26'; Oppenheim (yellow card) 32'; Pendleton 35'; Lopez (yellow card) 62'; Guzman Jr. (yellow card) 90'	Report	Merritt (yellow card) 3' (goal) 60'; Thanhofer 48'; Torres 53', 88'; Lezzar 85'; Lewis 89'	Stadium: Kezar Stadium; Referee: Bhavik Dutt

July 19 Conference Semifinals	Ballard FC	4–3	Colorado Storm	Seattle, Washington
9:30 PM ET	Villanueva (yellow card) 27'; Schelb 33', 68' (pen.); Alvarez 71'; Veillard 90+3'	Report	Osifodunrin 37'; Murillo 60'; Richard 90+2'; Michael (yellow card) 90+3'; Sumner (yellow card) 90+3'	Stadium: Interbay Stadium; Referee: Aidan Atkins

July 24 Conference Final	Ballard FC	1–2	Ventura County Fusion	Flint, Michigan
3:00 PM ET	Hjalmarsson 10'; Veillard (yellow card) 81'	Report	Pierce 8'; Lopez 41' (yellow card) 78'	Stadium: Atwood Stadium; Referee: Corey Beecher

=== Semifinals ===
July 26 National Semifinal	Flint City Bucks	1–0	Ventura County Fusion	Flint, Michigan
7:00 PM ET	Kodua (yellow card) 69'; Moller–Jensen 90+8'; Jones (yellow card) 90+8'	Report	Torres (yellow card) 81'	Stadium: Atwood Stadium; Referee: Grace Barrett

July 26 National Semifinal	Laredo Heat SC	1–7	Vermont Green FC	Laredo, Texas
9:00 PM ET	Escobar (yellow card) 11'; Tavares 29'; Munoz (yellow card) 36'; Romero (yellow card) 68'; Kim (yellow card) 87'	Report	Ajagbe (yellow card) 12'; Zellefrow 19', 60', 62' (pen.); Aror 21'; Taylor (yellow card) 69'; Francou 72'; Miller (yellow card) 81'; Di Blasio 82'; Ventrella 89'	Stadium: PEG Energy Stadium; Attendance: 1,200; Referee: Edgar Garcia

=== USL League Two Final ===
August 1
7:30 PM ET

Flint City Bucks	1–2	Vermont Green FC
Zomeno (yellow card) 29'; Paiva 64'; Clark (yellow card) 75'	Report	Kpardeh (yellow card) 53'; Jones 62' (o.g.); Zellefrow 76' (pen.); Miller (yellow card) 79'

Atwood Stadium, Flint, Michigan
Attendance: 6,396
Referee: Viviana Diaz

Championship MVP: (United States) Ryan Zellefrow Vermont Green FC

== Awards ==
=== Monthly Awards ===
Month	Player of the Month				References
Month	Player	Club	Position	Reason	References
May	(United States) Seth Hammond	Hill City FC	Forward	6 goals in 4 games	
June	(United States) Aaron Leon	Snohomish United	Forward	9 goals in 5 games, including 4 game winners	

Team of the Month
Month	Goalkeeper	Defenders	Midfielders	Forwards	Ref.
May	(Wales) Mawer (WVU)	(Norway) Pop (VER) (United States) Palomino (PGF) (Senegal) Mané (FTL)	(United States) Alves (NEFC) (Brazil) Campos (DOT) (United States) Arce (OAK) (United States) Silva (UTU)	(Ghana) Adagani (PEO) (United States) Hammond (HCF) (United States) Okerayi (ROY)	
June	(France) Helias (OCN)	(United States) Jackson (IRN) (United States) Lezzar (VCF) (United States) Behrmann (CH2)	(Brazil) Ramos (BSC) (United States) Gonzalez (51O) (United States) Richards (CDL) (Yemen) Alomari (BUF)	(United States) Donovan (MCS) (United States) Faust (OCN) (United States) Leon (SNO)	

=== Yearly Awards ===
Award	Winner	Team	Reason	Ref.
Golden Boot	(United States) Nathan Donovan	Minneapolis City SC	16 Goals in 11 games	
Golden Boot	(United States) Diego Robles	West Texas FC	16 Goals in 12 games	
Golden Glove	(United States) Sep Habibi	Colorado Storm	0.25 Goals Against Average; 9 Cleansheets	
Defender of the Year	(United States) Brandon Marshall	Vermont Green FC	86% overall passing percentage and 91% passing accuracy in the middle-third across the regular season	
Young (U20) Player of the Year	NA	NA	NA	
Player of the Year	(United States) Nathan Donovan	Minneapolis City SC	16 Goals in 11 games	
Goal of the Year	NA	NA	NA	
Coach of the Year	NA	NA	NA	

Divisional Players of the Year
Division	Player	Team
Eastern Conference
Chesapeake	(Colombia) Santiago Hoyos	Lionsbridge FC
Metropolitan	(United States) Julian Lacher	FC Motown STA
Mid-Atlantic	(United States) Nicholas Bustos	LVU Rush
Northeast	(France) Jeremy Francou	Vermont Green FC
South Atlantic	(England) Russell Berko	Appalachian FC
Central Conference
Great Forest	(Yemen) Ali Alomari	FC Buffalo
Great Lakes	(France) Enzo Beatrix	Kalamazoo FC
Great Plains	(United States) Jony Muñoz	Santafé Wanderers FC
Heartland	(United States) Nathan Donovan	Minneapolis City SC
Valley	(Brazil) Gabriel Stevenato	West Virginia United
Southern Conference
Lone Star	(United States) Mere Escobar	Laredo Heat SC
Mid South	(Uganda) Abubaker Mayanja	Red River FC
Ranger	(United States) Diego Robles	West Texas FC
South Central	(United States) Ian Shaul	Swarm FC
South Florida	(United States) Lukas Cortes	Weston FC
Southeast	(Brazil) Caue Ramos	Brave SC
Western Conference
Mountain	(United States) Sep Habibi	Colorado Storm
Nor Cal	(United States) Dane Pendleton	San Francisco City FC
Northwest	(United States) Aaron Leon	Snohomish United
Southwest	(United States) Jose De La Torre	Redlands FC

== Conference Teams of the Year ==
=== Eastern Conference ===
F: (Colombia) Santiago Hoyos (LIO), (United States) Gabriel Faust (OCN), (England) Russell Berko (APP) *, (France) Jeremy Francou (VER)
M: (Norway) Jonas Sundli-Hardig (CLT), (United States) Ashton Bilow (ASH), (United States) Connor Miller (VER)
D: (United States) Brandon Marshall (VER) (Defender of the Year), (United States) Marcus Jackson (IRN), (United States) Nicholas Bustos (LVU)
G: (United States) Alan Rutkowski (STA)

=== Southern Conference ===
F: (United States) Parker Plaxco (TEX), (Uganda) Abubaker Mayanja (RR), (Spain) Julen Recalde (MIS), (United States) Diego Robles (WTX) (Co-Golden Boot) *
M: (Brazil) Caue Ramos (BRV), (United States) Mere Escobar (LAR), (United States) Ian Shaul (SWA)
D: (Spain) Daniel Losfablos (LRR), (United States) Joshua Hallenberger (DOT), (Portugal) Vasco Tavares (LAR)
G: (Netherlands) Nigel Van Haveren (FLU)

=== Central Conference ===
F: (Yemen) Ali Alomari (BUF), (United States) Hakeem Morgan (MCS), (United States) Oliver Moller-Jensen (FCB), (United States) Nathan Donovan (MCS) (Co-Golden Boot and Player of the Year) *
M: (Brazil) Theo Da Silva (WVU), (United States) Jony Muñoz (SFW), (France) Enzo Beatrix (KAL)
D: (Tanzania) Jackson Kasanzu (PEO), (United States) Alex Barger (SUE), (England) Kai Forsyth (MWU)
G: (England) Josh Lane (STC)

=== Western Conference ===
F: (United States) Dane Pendleton (SFC) *, (United States) Aaron Leon (SNO), (United States) Edgar Leon (SNO), (United States) Malcolm Zalayet (MAR)
M: (United States) Miles Merritt (VCF), (United States) Zach Ramsey (BAL), (United States) Roberto Gonzalez (51O)
D: (United States) Siddiq Lezzar (VCF), (England) Tate Richards (POR), (United States) Elijah Bishop (COL),
G: (United States) Sep Habibi (COL) (Golden Glove)

* denotes Player of the Conference
