= David Flaschen =

American soccer player

Personal information
- Full name: David J.S. Flaschen
- Place of birth: Summit, New Jersey, U.S.
- Position: Goalkeeper

College career
Years	Team	Apps	(Gls)
- Brown Bears

Senior career*
Years	Team	Apps	(Gls)
1977–1978	Chicago Sting	9	(0)
- * Club domestic league appearances and goals

David Flaschen is an American retired soccer goalkeeper who spent played professionally in the North American Soccer League. He is a partner with Castanea Partners, Inc.

== Soccer ==
Flaschen attended Brown University, playing on the men's soccer team. He graduated with a bachelor's degree in psychology and is a member of the Brown University Sports Hall of Fame. The Chicago Sting selected Flaschen in the first round of the 1977 North American Soccer League draft. He played two seasons with the Sting.

== Business ==
Flaschen earned a master's degree in entrepreneurial management from the Wharton School of Business. He was a founding member of the executive committee of the North American Soccer League (NASL) Players Association. After leaving soccer, Flaschen embarked on a career in the business world focusing on financial services. He spent ten years with Dun & Bradstreet and was the president of ACNielsen. From 1995 to 1997, he was the chairman and CEO of Donnelly Marketing. In 1997, Flaschen became the president and CEO of Thomson Financial. In 2000, he moved to Flagship Ventures as a managing director. In May 2005, he left Flagship Ventures to become a partner at Castanea Partners, Inc. He is on the board of directors for Paychex, Informa, Curinos and John Nagle Company.

== See also ==
- Football in the United States
- List of football clubs in the United States
