= Columbus United FC =

Semi-professional soccer team based in Columbus, Georgia

Columbus United
- Full name: Columbus United Football Club
- Founded: 2023; 3 years ago
- Ground: A. J. McClung Memorial Stadium
- Capacity: 10,000
- Owner: Columbus Soccer Ventures
- General Manager: Eleni Hitchcock
- Head Coach: Stewart Flaherty
- League: USL League Two
- Website: columbusunitedfc.com

Columbus United FC is an American soccer club based out of Columbus, Georgia. The club competes in the USL League Two as a member of the Eastern Conference - South Central Division.

== History ==
=== National Premier Soccer League ===
Columbus, Georgia was announced as the location of a National Premier Soccer League (NPSL) expansion team on August 15, 2023, with plans to play in the 2024 season. In its first season, Columbus United finished the regular season with a 4-3-3 record, advancing to the Gulf Coast Sunshine Conference playoffs and winning the conference championship on July 13, 2024 with a 3-1 victory over Jacksonville Armada U-23. The team's playoff run continued in the NPSL regional and national playoffs before ending with a 2-0 loss to FC Motown in the national semifinals on July 27, 2024.

=== USL League Two ===
After one season in the NPSL, Columbus United joined USL League Two for the 2025 season.

The club's inaugural head coach, Brett Teach, served in the role for two seasons before he was replaced by Stewart Flaherty ahead of the 2026 season.

In the 2026 season, Columbus United was one of the first teams selected for the USL2's new "Game of the Week" broadcast initiative, providing an enhanced broadcast experience for marquee games. The team lost that game, 2-0 against Dothan United Soccer Club, in a matchup dubbed the "Peanut and Cola Derby."

In November 2026, the Columbus City Council approved a $30 million plan to renovate Columbus United's home ground, A.J. McClung Memorial Stadium.

== Colors and badge ==
=== Crest ===
On October 20, 2023, Columbus United FC's name and crest were unveiled to the public after fans voted on five potential options. The team name pays homage to a youth club from the 1970s that has deep ties to the Columbus community. The crest "has a retro vibe with the vintage soccer ball riding on the river into the middle of the letter G in reference to Georgia," according to the club's branding document.

=== Colors ===
Columbus United's colors are United Blue, Cavalry Blue, Ranger Gold, Classics Red, and Chattahoochee Whitecap.

=== Sponsorship ===
Date	Primary sponsor	Kit manufacturer
2024–present	Hughston Clinic	Puma

== Year-by-year ==
Year	Division	League	Record (W-D-L)	Regular season	Playoffs	U.S. Open Cup
2024	4	NPSL	4-3-3	2nd, Southeast Conference Group B	National Semifinals	Did not qualify
2025	4	USL2	5-2-5	5th, South Central Division	Did not qualify	Did not qualify
2026	4	USL2	4-6-2	3rd, South Central Division	Did not qualify	Did not qualify

=== Grounds ===
- Kinnett Stadium at Shaw High School; Columbus, Georgia, (2024)
- A. J. McClung Memorial Stadium; Columbus, Georgia, (2025–present)

== Honors ==
Honor		Champions
National Premier Soccer League	Regional championship	2024
National Premier Soccer League	Conference championship	2024
