= Jony Muñoz =

American soccer player

Personal information
- Full name: Jony Muñoz
- Date of birth: November 8, 2001 (age 24)
- Place of birth: Olathe, Kansas
- Height: 5 ft 7 in (1.70 m)
- Position: Midfielder

Team information
- Current team: Santafé Wanderers
- Number: 10

Youth career
- 2015–2018: Sporting Kansas City
- 2018–2020: Toca FC
- 2018–2020: Olathe West Owls

College career
Years	Team	Apps	(Gls)
2020–2021	Liberty Flames	0	(0)
2021	Kansas City Roos	20	(8)
2022–2023	MidAmerica Nazarene Pioneers	39	(17)
2024	Grand Canyon Antelopes	18	(1)

Senior career*
Years	Team	Apps	(Gls)
2025–	Santafé Wanderers	4	(1)
- * Club domestic league appearances and goals as of April 30, 2024

Jony Muñoz (born November 8, 2001) is an American soccer player who currently plays for the Santafé Wanderers of USL League Two. Muñoz, the 2020 recipient of the Gatorade Boys' Soccer Player of the Year Award, played college soccer for Liberty University, the University of Missouri–Kansas City, MidAmerica Nazarene University, and Grand Canyon University.

Growing up, Muñoz played high school soccer for Olathe West High School and for the youth academy teams of Toca FC and Sporting Kansas City.

== Career ==
=== High school and academy ===
Muñoz played club soccer for Sporting Kansas City's Academy during his freshman and sophomore years of high school, before playing high school soccer for Olathe West during his junior and senior years. Muñoz, a devout Christian, said the choice was "a God-led decision", which helped him have a more balanced life. During his senior year of high school, Muñoz lead the Owls to a 20–1–0 record, and Kansas Class 6A State Championship, Olathe West's first ever state championship in a team sport. Muñoz played in all 21 matches, scoring 36 goals and dishing out 19 assists his senior year of high school. While in high school, Munoz also played club soccer for Toca FC in the Kansas City metropolitan area.

On June 17, 2020, Muñoz was awarded Gatorade Boys' Soccer Player of the Year Award for the top boys' soccer player in the country. He is the first soccer player from the state of Kansas to win the honor. He was also named the Gatorade Kansas Player of the Year (2020).

=== College ===
Pending developments of the COVID-19 pandemic, Muñoz was scheduled to begin playing college soccer for Liberty University ahead of the 2020 NCAA Division I men's soccer season. However, Muñoz transferred to University of Missouri–Kansas City (UMKC) ahead of the spring portion of the 2020 season. During his freshman year with UMKC, Muñoz made fourteen appearances, scoring six times, earning third team Freshman All-American honors by College Soccer News.

After a single season with UMKC, Muñoz transferred to NAIA school, MidAmerica Nazarene University for the 2022 and 2023 NAIA men's soccer seasons, winning the NAIA National Championship in 2023. At MidAmerica Nazarene, Muñoz made 39 appearances, tallying 17 goals.

Muñoz returned to NCAA Division I soccer ahead of the 2024 NCAA Division I men's soccer season, where he played for Grand Canyon University. There he made 18 appearances, 15 of which were starts, notching a goal and three assists.

== Personal life ==
Muñoz is a devout Christian and plays guitar in his church's worship band. With his church, he went on a week-long mission trip to Mexico.

== Honors ==
=== Individual ===
- Gatorade Boys' Soccer National Player of the Year Award: 2020
- Gatorade Kansas Player of the Year Award: 2020

=== Team ===
- Olathe West High School
  - Kansas 6A Boys State High School Soccer Champions: 2019
