= Montgomery United FC =

Montgomery United
- Full name: Montgomery United Football Club
- Nickname: The Storm
- Founded: 2024; 2 years ago
- Ground: Emory Folmar YMCA Soccer Complex Championship Stadium
- Capacity: 4,000
- League: USL League Two
- 2025: 7th. of Southern Conf.
- Website: montgomeryunitedfc.com
Home colors	Away colors

Montgomery United FC is an American soccer club based in Montgomery, Alabama. The team was founded in 2024 and currently competes in USL League Two, the fourth tier of the United States soccer league system.

== History ==
The club was founded in 2024, succeeding Alabama FC South, and announced in December of that year that it would be joining USL League Two. Their first home schedule was released in February 2025, consisting of seven home matches to be played in the 2025 USL League Two season.

Tate Dean was announced as the team's first head coach in January 2025. He stepped down in September.

== Year-by-year ==
Season records for Montgomery United FC
Year	Division	League	Regular season	Playoffs
2025	4	USL League Two	7th, South Central Division	Did not qualify
2026	4	USL League Two	5th, South Central Division	Did not qualify
