= West Seattle Junction FC =

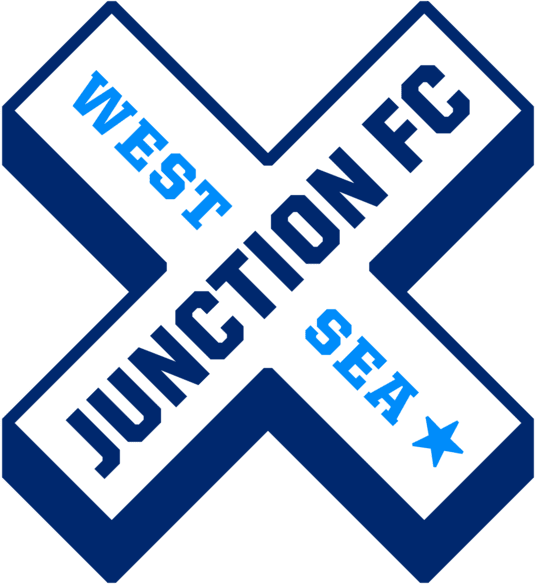
- Nickname: Blues
- Founded: December 2023; 2 years ago
- Stadium: Nino Cantu Southwest Athletics Complex
- Capacity: 4,000
- Owners: Jessica Pierce; Tim McMonigle; Cory Hintorn
- Head Coach: Mike Mata
- League: USL League Two
- 2026: 6th, Northwest Division; Playoffs: Did not qualify
- Website: wsjunctionfc.club
Home colors	Away colors

West Seattle Junction FC is an American soccer club based in Seattle, Washington. The club plays in the Northwest Division of USL League Two, a semi-professional summer league. Junction FC began play in the 2024 season, where they finished fifth in the division.

The team's home stadium is Nino Cantu Southwest Athletics Complex, on the campus of Chief Sealth International High School. A women's team, West Seattle Rhodies FC, was announced in October 2024 and debuted in the USL W League with the 2025 season.

== History ==
The club was founded in 2023 by Jessica Pierce ahead of the 2024 season. The team is based in the West Seattle neighborhood and would play its home matches in the Nino Cantu Southwest Athletics Complex.

West Seattle Junction FC played their first match on May 19, 2024, tying 2–2 versus Capital FC from Salem, Oregon. On their second-to-last match of the season, the team held Román Torres Foundation Night, where the former Seattle Sounders legend was in attendance, signing autographs and selling his book. The match ended in a 2–2 draw versus Midlakes United. West Seattle Junction FC finished their first season in 5th place in the Northwest Division and did not qualify for the playoffs.

The club started the 2025 season on a cold streak as they went winless throughout their first 10 matches. Despite the slow start, they won their last four matches of the season, which placed them 6th in the Northwest Division to end the 2025 season. The team held a community art event on their June 22 match versus Tacoma Stars FC to highlight local artists. They additionally had a merchandise line drop at the match, which included merch inspired by well-known West Seattle muralist Desmond Hansen. The match ended in a 0-0 draw. The club's final home match of the 2025 season was a thriller as West Seattle Junction FC came back from a 0–3 deficit at halftime to win 4–3 against Bigfoot FC.

Ahead of the start of the 2026 Season, Junction FC appointed 2-time UPSL PNW Championship-winning coach, Mike Mata, to be their head coach for the 2026 season. Junction FC opened their season with a dominant 4-0 win at home against Tacoma Stars FC. On June 21, Junction FC and Rhodies FC both whore their new "Red, White & Blues" third kit to honor the U.S. Men's National Team and to celebrate the 250th anniversary of the United States of America. Games in which Rhodies FC drew 1-1 to Portland Cherry Bombs FC and Junction FC lost 1-2 to Ballard FC. Rhodies FC finished 2nd in the Northwest Division, finishing a single point behind eventual USL W League National Champions Salmon Bay FC, missing out on a NW Division championship and a USL W League playoff berth. West Seattle Junction FC finished the season with their lowest season point total to date, ending up with 14 points which placed them 6th in the Northwest Division.

== Year-By-Year ==
=== West Seattle Junction FC ===
Season Records
Year	Division	League	Regular Season	Playoffs
2024	Northwest	USL League Two	5th (17 PTS)	did not qualify
2025	Northwest	USL League Two	6th (16 PTS)	did not qualify
2026	Northwest	USL League Two	6th (14 PTS)	did not qualify

=== West Seattle Rhodies FC ===
Season Records
Year	Division	League	Regular season	Playoffs
2025	4	USL W League	3rd, Northwest	did not qualify
2026	4	USL W League	2nd, Northwest	did not qualify
