= Cleveland Force SC =

American Soccer Club

Cleveland Force
- Full name: Cleveland Force Soccer Club
- Founded: 2018; 8 years ago
- Ground: Krenzler Field, Cleveland, Ohio
- Capacity: 1,680
- Head coach: Carl Nolan (men's); Rob Miller (women's)
- League: USL League Two; USL W League
- 2025: 5th, Great Forest Conference; 2nd, Great Forest Conference
- Website: clevelandforcesc.com
Home colours

Cleveland Force SC is an American pre-professional soccer club based in Cleveland, formed in 2018 after a merger of three of Cleveland's most prestigious Youth Soccer Clubs: CSA Impact, Cleveland United, and Internationals SC. The club has two senior teams, with the men's team playing in the USL League Two and the women's team playing in the USL W League, along with several youth teams competing at the national, regional, and local levels.

== Men's team history ==
On January 19, 2022, USL League Two announced Cleveland Force Soccer Club as a new club for the 2022 season, joining the newly-formed Valley Division. Ahead of the 2025 season, USL League Two announced a divisional realignment, with Cleveland Force SC moving to the new Great Forest Division.

=== Seasons ===
As of July 11, 2026

Season	League											Position		Playoffs	USOC
Season	League	Div	Pld	W	L	D	GF	GA	GD	Pts	PPG	Conf.	Overall	Playoffs	USOC
2022	USL2	Valley	14	1	4	9	15	36	-21	7	0.50	6th	102nd	DNQ	R2
2023	USL2	Valley	12	5	3	4	27	18	+9	19	1.58	2nd	39th	CQF	R2
2024	USL2	Valley	12	5	2	5	22	19	+3	20	1.67	2nd	52nd	CQF	DNQ
2025	USL2	Great Forest	12	3	8	1	15	23	-8	10	0.83	5th	111th	DNQ	DNQ
2026	USL2	Great Forest	12	3	0	9	21	40	-19	9	0.75	6th		DNQ	DNQ
Total	–	–	62	17	17	28	100	136	-36	65	1.05	-	-	-	

== Women's team history ==
Cleveland Force SC was announced as an expansion club for the USL W League on October 13, 2022, to begin play in the 2023 season as a member of the Great Lakes Division. Ahead of the 2025 season, the Force were moved to the newly-formed Great Forest Division as part of a divisional realignment.

=== Seasons ===
As of July 19, 2025

Season	League											Position		Playoffs
Season	League	Div	Pld	W	L	D	GF	GA	GD	Pts	PPG	Conf.	Overall	Playoffs
2023	USLW	Great Lakes	12	1	11	0	7	19	-12	3	0.25	6th	63rd	DNQ
2024	USLW	Great Lakes	12	5	1	6	22	18	+4	16	1.33	4th	66th	DNQ
2025	USLW	Great Forest	12	5	2	3	16	15	+1	18	1.80	2nd	34th	DNQ
Total	–	–	36	11	14	9	45	52	-7	37	1.03	-	-	-

== Name, Colors, and Badge ==
The club is the third team to use the Cleveland Force name, which was previously used by the Cleveland Force of the original Major Indoor Soccer League from 1978 to 1988, and was later revived by the Cleveland Crunch during their final four seasons (2001–2005). The name is a reference to the Force from the Star Wars film franchise, the first film of which was released the year prior to the original Force's inaugural season.

Like the original Force, the club's colors are blue and yellow.

== Stadium ==
Both the men's and women's first teams currently play their home games at Krenzler Field, a 1,680-seat soccer venue on the campus of Cleveland State University.

== See also ==
- Cleveland Force (1978–1988)- indoor soccer club, member of Major Indoor Soccer League and first user of the Force name
- Cleveland Crunch – indoor soccer club, member of Major League Indoor Soccer, known as Cleveland Force from 2001 to 2005
- Cleveland City Stars– previous professional soccer club in Cleveland (2006–2009)
- Cleveland SC- NPSL club established in 2018
- Cleveland Pro Soccer – upcoming MLS Next Pro club set to play in 2025
- List of Cleveland sports teams
- Sports in Cleveland
