= Albany Rush =

- Full name: Albany Rush Soccer
- Founded: 2021; 5 years ago
- League: USL League Two
- 2024: 6th, Northeast Division; Playoffs: DNQ
- Website: https://www.northeastrush.com
Home colours

Albany Rush is an American soccer club that plays in USL League Two. Albany Rush is a part of the Northeast Rush soccer organization. Northeast Rush is a leading youth soccer organization serving communities throughout New York, Connecticut, Massachusetts, and Rhode Island.

== History ==
Albany Rush is a part of the Rush Soccer organization. The club was signed to the USL2 league expansion in 2020. The club was originally known as the Blackwatch Rush in their inaugural season. The Albany Rush play their home matches on the campus of Union College at College Park Field in Schenectady, New York

== Year-by-year ==
| Year | Division | League | Regular season | Playoffs | U.S. Open Cup |
|---|---|---|---|---|---|
| 2022 | 4 | USL League Two | 8th, Northeast | did not qualify | did not qualify |
| 2023 | 4 | USL League Two | 6th, Northeast | did not qualify | did not qualify |
| 2024 | 4 | USL League Two | 6th, Northeast | did not qualify | did not qualify |
| 2025 | 4 | USL League Two | 8th, Northeast | did not qualify | did not qualify |
| 2026 | 4 | USL League Two | 5th, Northeast | did not qualify | did not qualify |
