= Rip Hewes Stadium =

Coordinates: 31°12′20.65″N 85°24′11.22″W

Rip Hewes Stadium is a 10,000-seat stadium located in Dothan, Alabama. It is primarily used as the home of the Dothan High School football and soccer teams, as well as other sporting and community events. It formerly shared home field with Dothan High School and Northview High School.

Evangelist Billy Graham once held an evangelistic campaign event here during his second trip through Dothan. His previous event was held at the First Baptist Church, Dothan. Due to the overwhelming crowds at the First Baptist Church, his evangelistic campaign was held at Rip Hewes Stadium on his second trip to the area. Although it was pouring rain, crowds poured into the stadium to hear the gospel message.

The stadium underwent a massive multi-phase 14 million dollar renovation beginning in 2021. and completing in 2023.

In November 2023 it was announced as the home stadium for the Dothan United Dragons.
