= Project 51O =

American soccer team

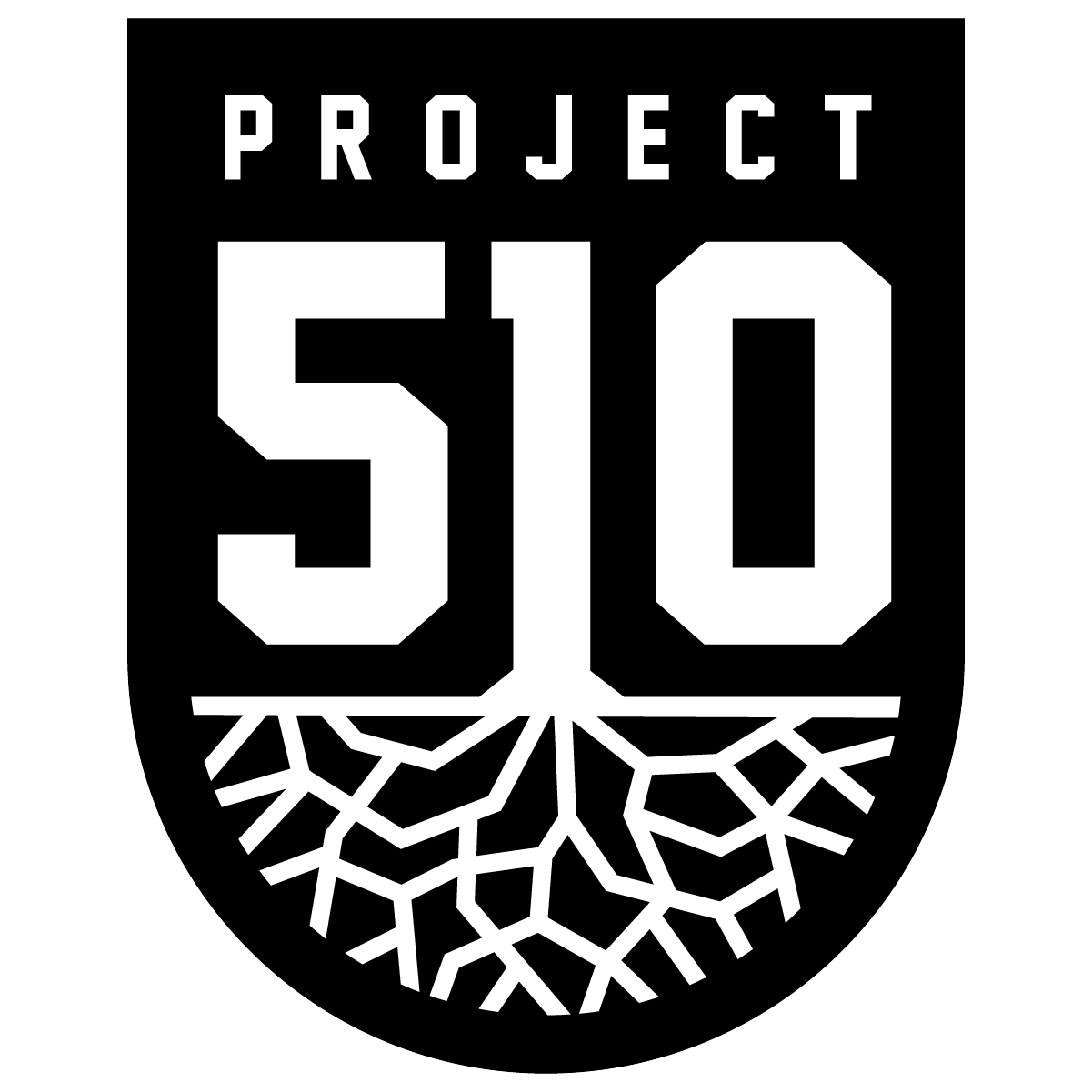
- Full name: Project 51O
- Founded: 2019; 7 years ago
- Stadium: UCSF Benioff Training Facility
- Head Coach: David Cordova
- League: USL League Two; UPSL
- 2025: 5th. of Nor Cal Division (no playoffs)
- Website: oaklandrootssc.com/project-510
Home colors

Project 51O is a soccer club from Oakland, California competing in USL League Two and United Premier Soccer League. They are the reserve club of USL Championship club Oakland Roots SC. The name 51O is partly inspired by Oakland's 510 area code, although features the letter O in place of the number 0 to stand for "Oakland".

== History ==
Oakland Roots SC launched their reserve club on December 9, 2019. The concept of Project 51O was based on Nike's Project 40, which ran from 1997 to 2005 and sought to develop the U.S. national team player pool. Project 51O will mirror parts of that development program, but with a community-based twist.

Originally set to compete in the National Premier Soccer League for the 2020 season, the team only played one match, a win over Napa Valley 1839 FC, before the season was halted and eventually cancelled due to the COVID-19 pandemic.

On September 17, 2020, the team announced it would compete in USL League Two beginning with the 2021 season. They later announced they would go on hiatus for that season along with the rest of the Southwest Division and begin League Two play in 2022. For the Fall 2021 season, they added a team in the United Premier Soccer League to allow for year-round development, while still remaining part of USL League Two.

== Players and staff ==
=== Current roster ===
2024

Note: Flags indicate national team as defined under FIFA eligibility rules; some limited exceptions apply. Players may hold more than one non-FIFA nationality.

No.	Pos.	Nation	Player
39	FW	USA	Javier Bedolla-Vera
46	MF	USA	Kieran Bracken
48	FW	USA	Luis Saldaña
50	DF	FRA	Thomas Camier
61	GK	USA	Edwin Rodriguez
88	DF	USA	Ilya Alekseev

== Year-by-year ==
Year	Division	League	Regular season	Playoffs	Open Cup
2020	4	NPSL	N/A, 1-0-0, Season cancelled to COVID-19 pandemic		
2021	4	USL2	Did not play due to COVID-19 pandemic		
2021 Fall	5	UPSL	3rd, 7-1-2, Wild West Conference	Round 1	N/A
2022	4	USL2	1st, 8-2-2, Southwest Division	Round 1	N/A
2022 Fall	5	UPSL	1st, 8-0-2, NorCal Conference	NorCal Finals	N/A
2023 Spring	5	UPSL	2nd, 7-2-1, NorCal South Conference	Round 1	N/A
2023	4	USL2	3rd, 5-0-7, NorCal Division	Did Not Qualify	Round 1
2023 Fall	5	UPSL	2nd, 7-2-1, NorCal South Conference	National Round of 32	N/A
2024 Spring	5	UPSL	4th, 6-1-3, NorCal South Conference	Round 2	N/A
2024	4	USL2	2nd, 9-1-4, NorCal Division	Conference Finals	N/A
2024 Fall	5	UPSL	1st, 9-1-0, NorCal South Conference	National Round of 32	N/A
2025 Spring	5	UPSL	4th, 3-4-3 NorCal South Conference	Round 1	N/A
2025	4	USL2	5th, 5-6-3 NorCal Division	Did Not Qualify	N/A
2025 Fall	5	UPSL	1st, 7-1-2 NorCal South Conference	Round 1	N/A
2026 Spring	5	UPSL	4th, 4-3-3 NorCal South Conference	Round 2	N/A
2026	4	USL2	2nd, 10-1-3 NorCal Division	Round 1	N/A

== Honors ==
=== League ===
- USL League Two
  - Southwest Division Champions: 2022
- UPSL
  - NorCal Regular Season Conference Champions: Fall 2022
  - NorCal South Regular Season Conference Champions: Fall 2024, Fall 2025
  - NorCal South Playoff Conference Champions: Fall 2023, Fall 2024

=== Cups ===
- Street Soccer USA
  - SSUSA Oakland Cup: Dia de los Muertos 2023, Dia de los Muertos 2025
