= Snohomish United =

- Full name: Snohomish United
- Founded: 2024; 2 years ago
- Stadium: Stocker Fields; Snohomish, Washington, U.S.
- Coordinates: 47°54′28″N 122°05′06″W
- Head coach: Hamza Haddadi
- League: Men's: USL League Two; Women's: USL W League
- 2025: 2nd, Northwest Division; Playoffs: Conference Semifinals
- Website: snohomishunited.org
Home colors

Snohomish United is an American soccer club based in Snohomish, Washington, in the Seattle metropolitan area. Their semi-professional men's team in the Northwest Division of USL League Two began play in 2025. A women's team in the USL W League is planned to begin play in 2026.

== History ==
Snohomish Youth Soccer was founded in the 1970s to organize youth soccer competitions in Snohomish County and began to field a premier boys' team named Snohomish United in 1989. The organization also hosts several annual soccer tournaments, including the Snohomish United Invitational, Kla Ha Ya Days Adult Tournament, and Bigfoot Tournament for hundreds of youth teams. Snohomish United later became affiliated with the Elite Clubs National League.

On November 7, 2024, USL announced that Snohomish United would field a USL League Two club beginning in the 2025 season. The men's team would play in the Northwest Division alongside other local clubs in Washington and Oregon. Snohomish United also announced plans to add bleacher seating at its existing youth soccer complex, Stocker Fields near downtown Snohomish. The bleacher seats were supplemented by picnic tables and other forms of sideline seating. Hamza Haddadi, who also coaches at Crossfire Premier SC, was named the team's first head coach.

In their inaugural season, Snohomish United finished second in the Northwest Division—with a record of eight wins, four losses, and two draws—and qualified for the playoffs alongside division leaders Ballard FC. The team defeated Utah United 2–0 in the Western Conference quarterfinals, but lost in the semifinals to Ballard FC at Interbay Stadium in Seattle. In November 2025, Snohomish United announced that they would field a women's team in the USL W League's Northwest Division beginning in 2026. The women's team will share Stocker Fields with the men's team. Bernie James was announced as the women's team's head coach in December 2025.

== Stadium ==
Snohomish United plays home games at Stocker Fields, a complex of soccer fields near downtown Snohomish. For the USL teams, two grass fields and a training field were designated; a set of bleachers were also installed.

== Year-by-year ==
=== Men's team ===
Men's season records for Snohomish United
Year	Division	League	Regular season	Playoffs	U.S. Open Cup
2025	4	USL League Two	2nd, Northwest Division	Conference Semifinals	Did not enter
2026	4	USL League Two	2nd, Northwest Division	Conference Quarterfinals	Did not enter
