= Midlakes United =

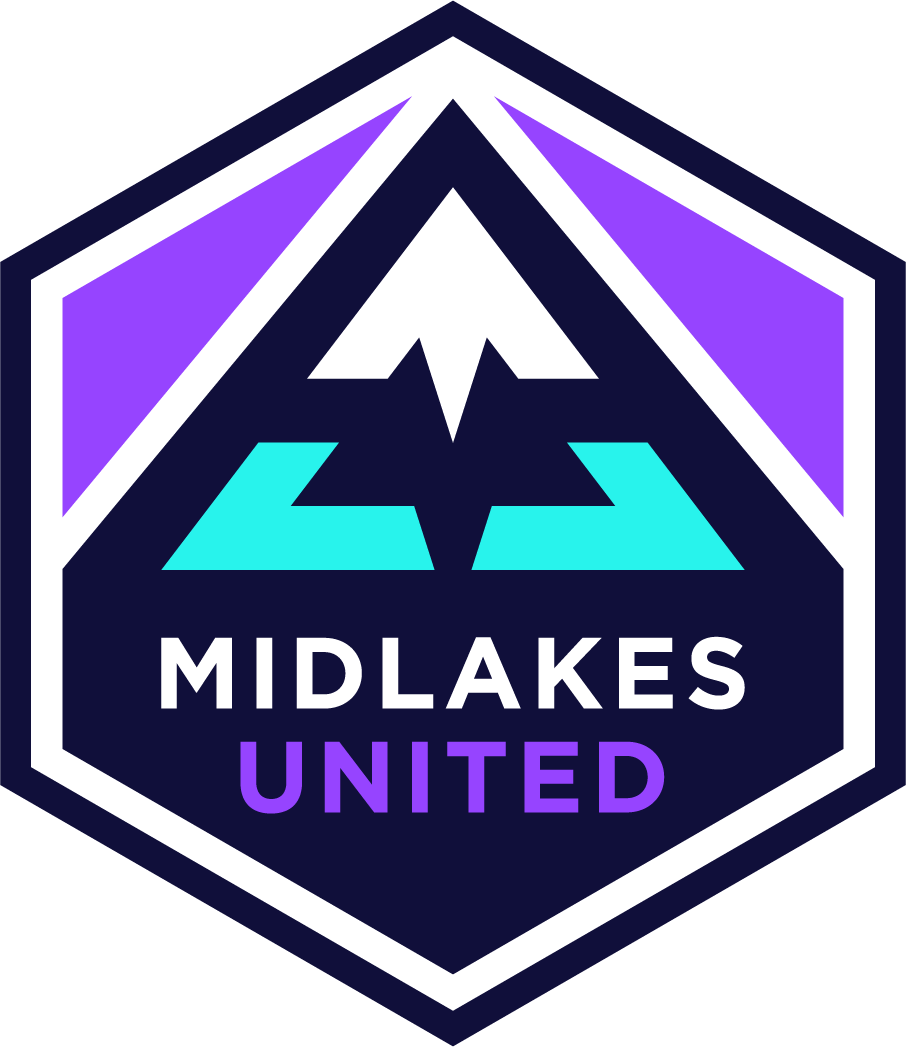
- Full name: Midlakes United
- Founded: December 26, 2023; 2 years ago
- Stadium: Bellevue College Soccer Field, Washington, U.S.
- Coordinates: 47°35′17.6″N 122°09′04.2″W
- Owner: Treencee Russell
- Head coach: Ryan Faithfull
- League: USL League Two
- 2025: 5th, Northwest Division
- Website: midlakesunited.com
Home colors	Away colors

Midlakes United is an American soccer club based in Bellevue, Washington, in the Seattle metropolitan area. They began play in the 2024 season. The team plays in the Northwest Division of USL League Two, a semi-professional national league.

== History ==
Midlakes United was founded in 2023 by owner and general manager Treencee Russell. Former USWNT player Justi Baumgardt was the team's first head coach.

Midlakes United made their league debut on May 19, 2024, with a loss at Lane United FC. The league home opener was played at the Bellevue College soccer pitch on May 31, 2024, with a win against United PDX. The team finished 4th in the USL2 Northwest Division at the conclusion of their first season.

For the 2025 season, Midlakes United hired head coach Felix Vu and a new coaching staff. Midlakes finished 5th in the USL2 Northwest Division at the conclusion of their second season.

On October 9, 2025, Midlakes United announced on Instagram that Ryan Faithfull will take the roll of head coach for the 2026 season.

== Players and staff ==
=== Technical staff ===
Position	Name
Head coach	(New Zealand) Ryan Faithfull
Lead assistant coach	(England) Shaun Spencer
Goalkeeper Coach	(United States) Elmer Rodriguez
Volunteer Assistant Coach	(United States) Sybren Russell

=== Roster ===
Position	Name	Number
Winger	(United States) Alex Notzka	23
Midfielder	(United States) Alexander Bazia	9
Midfielder	(United States) Allen Escalante	6
Center Back	(United States) Angel Martinez	13
Midfielder	(United States) Braden Ferreira	
Right Back	(Brazil) Bruno Fornes	25
Midfielder	(United States) Cameron Yriondo	
Midfielder	(United States) Chad Sovde	18
GK	(United States) Charlie Dyer	
Midfielder	(United States) Charlie Frink	
Left Back	(United States) Chase Larson	
Winger	(United States) Chris Soto	
Right Back	(United States) Connor Leber	2
Midfielder	(United States) Cooper Brunell	
Midfielder	(United States) Diego Zaldivar	
Right Back	(Japan) Eiji Hata	3
Forward	(United States) Emmett Layman	
Striker	(United States) Finn Reynolds	
Striker	(United States) Francisco Magaña	20
GK	(United States) Fred Reiter	30
Midfielder	(United States) Habib Barry	29
Midfielder	(Japan) Hayato Morimoto	
Defender	(United States) Jack Cameron	
Central Midfielder	(United States) Jack Ryan Jeremiah	8
Striker	(United States) James Lear	
Winger	(United States) Jason Buezo	7
Winger	(United States) JJ Diaz	
Right Back	(United States) Josh Hardin	5
Center Back	(United States) Krubelle Tesfaye	
GK	(United States) Levi Bieber	1
Midfielder	(United States) Lucas McAllister	
Midfielder	(United States) Lukas Shriner	
Striker	(United States) Michael Luande	
Center Back	(United States) Mikey Sherlock	12
Striker	(United States) Nick Walker	
Winger	(United States) Patrick Dormoh	22
Center Back	(United States) Philip Kleeman	34
Center Back	(Fiji) Richard Rokodi-Phelps	
Midfielder	(United States) Riley Cotton	
Winger	(United States) Smith Russell	
Midfielder	(Ethiopia) Surafel Abebe	
Left Back	(United States) Takashi Sasaki	
Center Back	(Italy) Tommaso Casadei	24
Midfielder	(England) Woody Brown	

== Year-by-year ==
Season records for Midlakes United
Year	League	Regular season	Playoffs
2024	USL League Two	4th, Northwest Division	Did not qualify
2025	USL League Two	5th, Northwest Division	Did not qualify
2026	USL League Two	4th, Northwest Division	Did not qualify
