= NEFC =

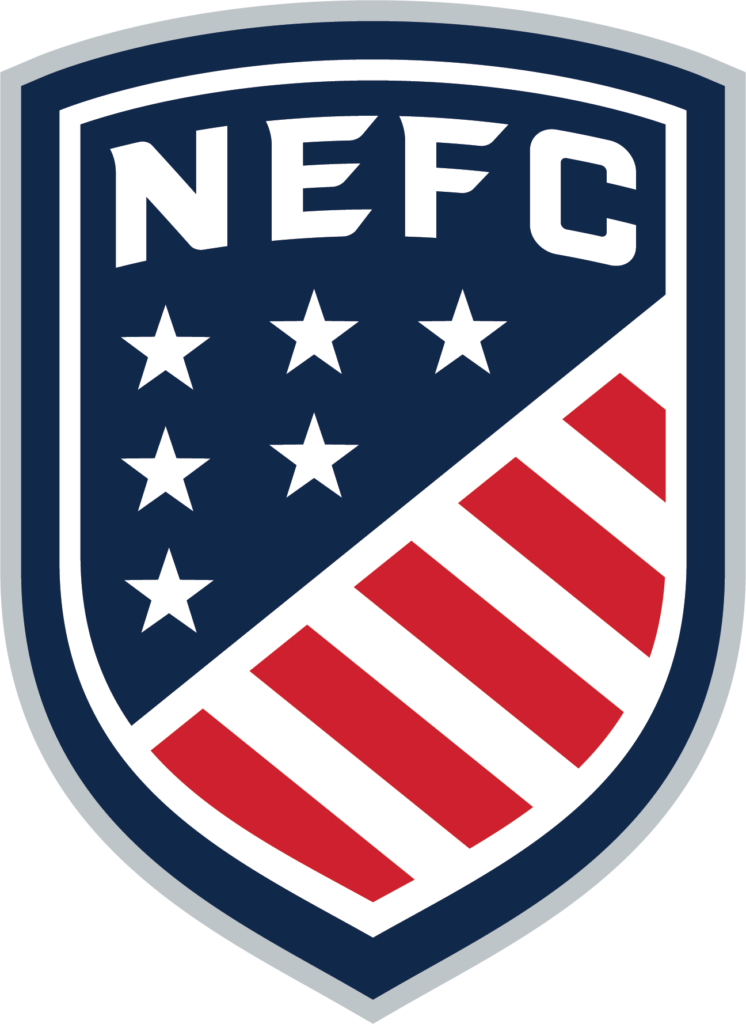
- Full name: New England Fútbol Club
- Short name: NEFC
- Founded: May 1, 2009; 17 years ago
- Stadium: WPI Alumni Stadium
- Capacity: 2,000
- President: Brian Mazar
- Director: Christian Battaglia
- Team Manager: Paul Baber
- Coach: Jake Beverlin
- League: USL League Two Girls academy MLS next Necsl Nepsl N1
- Website: nefc.us
Home colors	Away colors

NEFC, formally known as New England Fútbol Club, is an American semi-professional soccer club based in the Greater Boston, Massachusetts area. The club was originally founded in 2009 as a youth soccer training academy and now competes with its senior team in the Northeast Division of USL League Two, starting with the 2025 season.

The club was established on May 1, 2009, through the merger of two existing youth soccer clubs: the New England Eagles FC and FC PUMA. The organization later expanded its structure in May 2014 by merging with the Black Watch Premier Soccer Club, though it continued to operate under the NEFC name. NEFC is a not-for-profit entity focused on player development and college placement, training over 3,000 youth players across Massachusetts, New Hampshire, and Rhode Island. The club's colors are red, navy, and white.

NEFC announced its entry into USL League Two in late 2024, debuting for the 2025 season to provide a pre-professional pathway for its players. The club plays its home matches at Worcester Polytechnic Institute's Alumni Stadium.

== History ==
NEFC was founded in 2009 with the merger of the New England Eagles FC and FC PUMA. It was further expanded in 2014 when it absorbed Black Watch Premier Soccer Club, but continued to play under the NEFC name. In 2024 the club announced it was adding a new level to the club, starting play in USL2 for the 2025 season. Prior to joining USL2 NEFC boasted 10 national titles in lower competitions. The team plans to launch a USL W League team in 2026. Southeast Soccer Club in Connecticut is an official NEFC Partner Club

== Performance ==
=== Year-by-year ===
Year-by-year performance
Year	League	Reg. season	Playoffs
2025	USL League Two	5th, Northeast	Did not qualify
2026	USL League Two	2nd, Northeast	Eastern Conference Qualifying Round

=== Future Plans ===
The club has announced plans to launch a women's team to compete in the USL W League in 2026.
