= Dothan United Soccer Club =

American soccer team

Dothan United
- Full name: Dothan United Soccer Club
- Nickname: Dragons
- Founded: 2023; 3 years ago
- Stadium: Rip Hewes Stadium
- Capacity: 10,000
- Owner: Steve Donner
- President: Steve Donner
- Head Coach: Carl Reynolds
- League: USL League Two
- Website: dothanunitedsoccer.com
Home colors	Away colors

Dothan United Soccer Club is a soccer club from Dothan, Alabama competing in the South Central Division of USL League Two.

== History ==
The team was announced on November 7, 2023, during that day's Dothan City Commission with the placeholder name Dothan FC and its inaugural season to be part of the 2024 USL League Two season.

In December 2023 a name-the-team contest was held and the official club name was announced on January 23, 2024, during a public ceremony.

== Year-by-year ==
Year	Division	League	Regular season	Playoffs	U.S. Open Cup
2024	4	USL League Two	3rd, South Central Division	Did not qualify	Did not enter
2025	4	USL League Two	2nd, South Central Division	National Semifinals	Did not qualify
2026	4	USL League Two	1st, South Central Division	Conference Quarterfinals	Did not qualify
