= Santafé Wanderers FC =

Santafé Wanderers
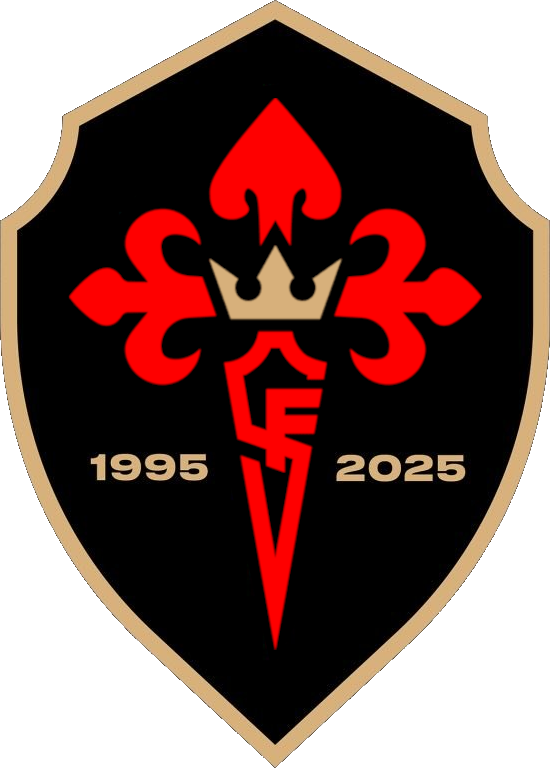
- Full name: Santafé Wanderers Football Club
- Founded: 1995; 31 years ago as Club de Fútbol Chihuahua
- Ground: Kansas City, Kansas
- Owner: Lorenzo Cadena Jr.
- League: USL League Two
- Website: santafewanderers.com
Home colours

Santafé Wanderers FC is a Kansas City, Kansas soccer club founded in 1995 to serve the local Hispanic and Latino community. The team has competed for decades in the Kansas City Kansas Adult Soccer League and later expanded into regional and pre-professional competitions. It runs youth programmes for local underrepresented communities and positions itself as a neighbourhood institution centred on opportunity and development. In 2025, it entered USL League Two, the lowest division of the United Soccer League.

== History ==
Santafé Wanderers FC were originally established in 1995 as Club de Fútbol Chihuahua by Lorenzo Cadena, Alonzo Cadena, Rosalio Contreras, and Eloy Flores. The club was founded to serve the local Hispanic and Latino immigrant community, providing both competitive adult soccer and opportunities for youth development. From its earliest days, the team competed in the Kansas City Kansas Adult Soccer League (KCKASL), the state's amateur men’s league, and since then has remained a consistent presence in local amateur soccer. The club’s early identity was closely tied to community and family traditions, combining weekend church attendance with soccer matches and fostering local social cohesion. The team name was eventually changed to Santafé Wanderers FC, a reference to the Santa Fe Trail. The trail connected Missouri to Santa Fe, New Mexico, and the name reflects the club’s local heritage and its cultural ties to Mexico.

Over time, the Wanderers became the oldest continuously operating amateur men’s team in Kansas City, winning multiple league championships and maintaining a rivalry with Quinto Elemento. The club gradually expanded its operations, adding youth programs for under-21 and high school-aged players from low-income and refugee communities. Several youth players have progressed to the senior team in the United Premier Soccer League (UPSL), where the club has competed regionally and won division titles while making Midwestern Conference playoff appearances. The club also participates in the Great Plains Premier League and other regional competitions.

In 2025, Santafé Wanderers FC joined USL League Two, marking the club’s entry into a semi-professional national competition. The team competes in the league’s Central Conference and plays its home matches in Kansas City, Kansas. In the club's inaugural USL League Two season, Santafé Wanderers garnered a record of 4 wins, 1 draw, and 7 losses (13 points), earning 4th place in the USL2 Great Plains Division. In 2026, the club took a strong step forward finishing second in the Great Plains division, winning 7 games, drawing 2, and losing 3 (23 points) narrowly missing the playoffs on average points.

== Team record: year-by-year ==
Year	Division	League	Regular season	Playoffs	Open Cup	Avg. attendance
2025	4	USL League Two	4th, Great Plains	did not qualify	did not qualify	—
2026	4	USL League Two	2nd, Great Plains	did not qualify	did not qualify	—

== Club culture and identity ==
=== Colors ===
The club's colors are red and black, inspired by the Brazilian club Flamengo.

=== Logo ===
The club's logo has gone through a number of redesigns over the years. A recent design originally incorporated a compass symbolising the Wanderers name and a Cross of Saint James referencing the founders’ faith, with white, navy, and golden wheat colours. The design is also a visual reference to the logo of RC Celta de Vigo. As of 2026, the logo has been redesigned in red and gold while retaining the cross motif. A crown replaced the compass, while the bottom of the cross incorporates the letters SF.
