= Davis Legacy SC =

Davis Legacy
- Full name: Davis Legacy Soccer Club
- Founded: 1992 (as Davis Youth Soccer League)
- Stadium: Tsakopoulos Family Soccer Complex
- Manager: Mark Torguson
- League: USL League Two
- 2025: 8th of NorCal Division (no playoffs)
- Website: davislegacysoccer.org
Home colours	Away colours

Davis Legacy Soccer Club is an American soccer club based in Davis, California, established in 1992, that began play in USL League Two in the 2022 season. As of 2023, they compete in the league's Nor Cal Division, in the Western Conference.

The club describes their mission as to "Provide the highest-levels of quality soccer training for players and enhance their social, emotional and physical health, in a positive and safe environment."

== History ==
Soccer prior to 1989 existed in Davis primarily at the recreational level, run by the Davis chapter of the American Youth Soccer Organization (AYSO). Teams that wished to compete competitively were required to apply to the California Youth Soccer Association (CYSA) under the umbrella of nearby Dixon due to a lack of teams in the Davis area. Finally, after a year of efforts by local parents and coaches, the Davis Youth Soccer League (DYSL) was formed in 1992 as a separate division of the CYSA.

Sometime between 2005 and 2010, the DYSL left the CYSA for upstart NorCal Premier Soccer and concurrently merged into one club, becoming Davis Legacy Soccer Club.

The club established its first semi-pro first team in 2019 in the United Premier Soccer League, and initially planned to compete beginning with the 2020 Spring Season.

On January 20, 2022, it was announced that the club would be joining USL League Two in the 2022 season. They played their first game on May 25, 2022, a 2–2 draw against San Francisco Glens SC at home.

== Stadium ==
The club plays their home matches on Field 7 at Tsakopoulos Family Soccer Complex (formerly known as Davis Legacy Soccer Complex), a 63-acre site which also hosts the club's youth development programs. The grounds were renamed in 2018 in recognition of the Tsakopoulos family's major land contributions.

== Technical staff ==
Position	Name
Head coach	Mark Torguson
Executive Director	(Scotland) David Robertson
Technical Advisor	Gordon Young
Director of Operations	Alex Park

== Year by year ==
Year	Level	League	Reg. season	Playoffs	U.S. Open Cup
2022	4	USL League Two	5th, Southwest	Did not qualify	Did not qualify
2023	4	USL League Two	7th, Nor Cal	Did not qualify	Did not qualify
2024	4	USL League Two	6th, Nor Cal	Did not qualify	Did not qualify
2025	4	USL League Two	8th, Nor Cal	Did not qualify	Did not qualify
2024	4	USL League Two	7th, Nor Cal	Did not qualify	Did not qualify
