= 1994 U.S. Interregional Soccer League (outdoor) season =

The 1994 United States Interregional Soccer League was an outdoor season run by the United States Interregional Soccer League.

== Regular season ==
=== Schedule ===
Each team had a 20-game schedule, with two games counting as Designated Makeup Games (DMGs). DMGs are plugged in for any game that was cancelled during the season.

=== Scoring ===
Teams in the Northeast and Midwest have points that reflect the addition of a 1-point corner kick bonus per game. The standings published by the USISL list only the wins, losses, goals scored, goals allowed and total points. They do not provide the number of wins or losses that came through shootouts. They also do not provide the number of bonus points coming from goals or corner kicks.

- Regulation win = 6 points
- Shootout win (SW) = 4 points
- Shootout loss (SL) = 2 points
- Regulation loss = 0 points
- Bonus points (BP): An additional one point per goal up to a maximum of three points per game.
- Northeast Division and Midwest Division teams received one point per corner kick each game.

=== Northeast Division ===
| Place | Team | GP | W | L | GF | GA | GD | Points |
|---|---|---|---|---|---|---|---|---|
| 1 | Long Island Rough Riders | 18 | 13 | 5 | 35 | 19 | +16 | 117 |
| 2 | Jersey Dragons | 18 | 12 | 6 | 39 | 23 | +16 | 110 (Note: Points deducted due to ineligible players.) |
| 3 | Cape Cod Crusaders | 18 | 10 | 8 | 39 | 25 | +14 | 98 |
| 4 | New Jersey Imperials | 18 | 10 | 8 | 28 | 25 | +3 | 98 |
| 5 | Delaware Wizards | 18 | 9 | 9 | 28 | 25 | +3 | 89 |
| 6 | New York Fever | 18 | 7 | 11 | 29 | 33 | -4 | 82 |
| 7 | Boston Storm | 18 | 5 | 13 | 24 | 47 | -23 | 65 |
| 8 | Connecticut Wolves | 18 | 6 | 12 | 14 | 32 | -18 | 59 |
| 9 | Philadelphia Freedom | 18 | 6 | 12 | 21 | 36 | -15 | 58 |

=== Atlantic Division ===
| Place | Team | GP | W | L | GF | GA | GD | Points |
|---|---|---|---|---|---|---|---|---|
| 1 | Greensboro Dynamo | 18 | 16 | 2 | 60 | 22 | +38 | 143 |
| 2 | Charleston Battery | 18 | 14 | 4 | 36 | 15 | +21 | 111 |
| 3 | Charlotte Eagles | 18 | 10 | 8 | 44 | 32 | +12 | 95 |
| 4 | Raleigh Flyers | 18 | 9 | 9 | 33 | 33 | 0 | 90 |
| 5 | Hampton Roads Hurricanes | 18 | 10 | 8 | 32 | 27 | +5 | 84 |
| 6 | Columbia Heat | 18 | 9 | 9 | 32 | 39 | -7 | 82 |
| 7 | Washington Mustangs | 18 | 11 | 7 | 33 | 29 | +4 | 80 (Note: Points deducted due to ineligible players.) |
| 8 | Baltimore Bays | 18 | 6 | 12 | 26 | 39 | -13 | 59 |
| 9 | Richmond Kickers | 18 | 4 | 14 | 21 | 43 | -22 | 44 |

=== Southeast Division ===
| Place | Team | GP | W | L | GF | GA | GD | Points |
|---|---|---|---|---|---|---|---|---|
| 1 | Cocoa Expos | 17 | 16 | 1 | 69 | 13 | +56 | 128 |
| 2 | Atlanta Magic | 17 | 11 | 6 | 44 | 36 | +8 | 104 |
| 3 | Florida Stars | 17 | 11 | 6 | 65 | 39 | +26 | 97 (Note: Points deducted due to ineligible players.) |
| 4 | Orlando Lions | 17 | 7 | 10 | 50 | 46 | +4 | 81 |
| 5 | Boca Raton Sabres | 18 | 6 | 12 | 37 | 48 | -11 | 73 (Note: Points deducted due to ineligible players.) |
| 6 | Fort Lauderdale Kicks | 17 | 5 | 12 | 25 | 53 | -28 | 53 |
| 7 | South Florida Flamingos | 17 | 3 | 14 | 19 | 80 | -61 | 37 |

=== Midwest Division ===
| Place | Team | GP | W | L | GF | GA | GD | Points |
|---|---|---|---|---|---|---|---|---|
| 1 | Minnesota Thunder | 18 | 18 | 0 | 61 | 14 | +47 | 170 |
| 2 | Milwaukee Rampage | 18 | 16 | 2 | 81 | 18 | +63 | 161 |
| 3 | Columbus Xoggz | 18 | 11 | 7 | 39 | 37 | +2 | 112 |
| 4 | St. Louis Knights | 18 | 11 | 7 | 46 | 37 | +9 | 108 |
| 5 | Detroit Wheels | 18 | 9 | 9 | 35 | 38 | -3 | 98 |
| 6 | Rockford Raptors | 18 | 10 | 8 | 36 | 34 | +2 | 98 |
| 7 | Des Moines Menace | 18 | 5 | 13 | 37 | 46 | -9 | 63 |
| 8 | Cincinnati Cheetas | 18 | 5 | 13 | 38 | 40 | -2 | 59 |
| 9 | Sioux City Breeze | 18 | 1 | 17 | 15 | 64 | -49 | 23 |

=== Midsouth Division ===
| Place | Team | GP | W | L | GF | GA | GD | Points |
|---|---|---|---|---|---|---|---|---|
| 1 | Louisville Thoroughbreds | 18 | 13 | 5 | 53 | 35 | +18 | 114 |
| 2 | New Orleans Riverboat Gamblers | 18 | 12 | 6 | 38 | 23 | +15 | 107 |
| 3 | Birmingham Grasshoppers | 18 | 13 | 5 | 36 | 19 | +17 | 104 |
| 4 | Lexington Bluegrass Bandits | 18 | 10 | 8 | 32 | 25 | +7 | 87 |
| 5 | Nashville Metros | 18 | 7 | 11 | 43 | 43 | 0 | 78 |
| 6 | Arkansas A's | 18 | 4 | 14 | 22 | 62 | -40 | 45 |
| 7 | Chattanooga Express | 18 | 5 | 13 | 16 | 45 | -29 | 36 |
| 8 | Memphis Jackals | 11 | 2 | 9 | 19 | 34 | -15 | 29 |

=== South Central Division ===
| Place | Team | GP | W | L | GF | GA | GD | Points |
|---|---|---|---|---|---|---|---|---|
| 1 | Tulsa Roughnecks | 18 | 16 | 2 | 52 | 18 | +44 | 132 |
| 2 | DFW Toros | 18 | 12 | 6 | 51 | 40 | +11 | 112 |
| 3 | San Antonio Pumas | 18 | 11 | 7 | 53 | 30 | +23 | 107 |
| 4 | Texas Lightning | 18 | 11 | 7 | 60 | 31 | +29 | 103 |
| 5 | Austin Lone Stars | 17 | 10 | 7 | 62 | 51 | +11 | 97 |
| 6 | Dallas Rockets | 18 | 9 | 9 | 39 | 48 | -9 | 86 |
| 7 | Oklahoma City Slickers | 18 | 4 | 14 | 28 | 57 | -29 | 46 |
| 8 | Wichita Blue Angels | 17 | 0 | 17 | 16 | 119 | -103 | 16 |

=== Southwest Division ===
| Place | Team | GP | W | L | GF | GA | GD | Points |
|---|---|---|---|---|---|---|---|---|
| 1 | East Los Angeles Cobras | 18 | 16 | 2 | 70 | 32 | +38 | 147 |
| 2 | El Paso Patriots | 18 | 13 | 5 | 57 | 28 | +29 | 120 (Note: Points deducted due to ineligible players.) |
| 3 | Valley Golden Eagles | 18 | 12 | 6 | 48 | 40 | +8 | 110 |
| 4 | Montclair Standard Falcons | 18 | 10 | 8 | 40 | 34 | +6 | 94 |
| 5 | Arizona Cotton | 18 | 7 | 11 | 49 | 33 | +16 | 79 |
| 6 | Tucson Amigos | 18 | 7 | 11 | 44 | 43 | +1 | 75 |
| 7 | New Mexico Chiles | 18 | 7 | 11 | 32 | 48 | -16 | 66 |
| 8 | Las Vegas Quicksilver | 18 | 3 | 15 | 31 | 84 | -53 | 48 |
| 9 | San Diego Top Guns | 9 | 4 | 5 | 16 | 19 | +3 | 37 |

=== Pacific Division ===
| Place | Team | GP | W | L | GF | GA | GD | Points |
|---|---|---|---|---|---|---|---|---|
| 1 | San Francisco United All-Blacks | 18 | 15 | 3 | 59 | 20 | +39 | 134 |
| 2 | North Bay Breakers | 18 | 14 | 4 | 55 | 29 | +26 | 125 |
| 3 | CCV Hydra | 18 | 13 | 5 | 62 | 31 | +31 | 122 |
| 4 | Chico Rooks | 18 | 12 | 6 | 43 | 30 | +13 | 108 |
| 5 | San Francisco Bay Diablos | 18 | 10 | 8 | 42 | 48 | -6 | 92 (Note: Points deducted due to ineligible players.) |
| 6 | Silicon Valley Firebirds | 18 | 9 | 9 | 42 | 28 | +14 | 85 |
| 7 | Reno Rattlers | 18 | 7 | 11 | 38 | 45 | -7 | 71 |
| 8 | Hawaii Tsunami | 18 | 3 | 15 | 24 | 77 | -53 | 40 |
| 9 | Santa Cruz Surf | 18 | 2 | 16 | 21 | 61 | -40 | 32 |
| 10 | Shasta Scorchers | 18 | 2 | 16 | 20 | 63 | -43 | 31 |

== Playoffs ==
=== Northeast Division ===
July 27, 1994

| Jersey Dragons (NJ) | 2-0 | Delaware Wizards (DE) |
|---|---|---|
| Manuel Archer 64'; Fred Butler 90' | Report |

John F Kennedy Stadium
Hoboken, New Jersey

July 30, 1994

| Long Island Rough Riders (NY) | 1-1 OT | Jersey Dragons (NJ) |
|---|---|---|
| Danny Mueller 66' | | 43' (yellow card) 109' Manuel Archer; (yellow card) 107' Junior Superbia |

Mitchell Park
Uniondale, New York
Attendance: 3,422

The game remained tied through two overtime periods. The Long Island Rough Riders advanced due to their 4–2 advantage in corner kicks.

July 31, 1994
`1:00 PM

| North Jersey Imperials (NJ) | 1-0 | Cape Cod Crusaders (MA) |
|---|---|---|
| Marek Sadowski 60' | Report |

Bruins Stadium, North Bergen, New Jersey
Attendance: 1,000

==== Final ====
August 5, 1994
7:30 PM

| North Jersey Imperials (NJ) | 2-3 | Long Island Rough Riders (NY) |
|---|---|---|
| Greg Bajek 64', 84' | Report | 43' Richard Nuttall; 51', 89' Giovanni Savarese |

Bruins Stadium, North Bergen, New Jersey

August 6, 1994

| Long Island Rough Riders (NY) | 1-0 | North Jersey Imperials (NJ) |
|---|---|---|
| Cordt Weinstein 90+2' | Report |

Mitchell Park
Uniondale, New York
Attendance: 4,463

The Long Island Rough Riders advanced.

=== Atlantic Division ===
July 30, 1994

| Charleston Battery (SC) | 4-1 | Hampton Roads Hurricanes (VA) |
|---|---|---|
| Andrew Coggins (23:55); Paul Young (31:20); Rich Hughes (45:55) | Report | (44:55) Byron Mitchell |

Stoney Field, Charleston, South Carolina
Attendance: 1,783
Referee: Sultan Dawood

July 30, 1994

| Charlotte Eagles (NC) | 2-0 | Raleigh Flyers (North Carolina) |
|---|---|---|
| Keith Dakin; Philibert Jones |

Charlotte Latin Stadium, Charlotte, North Carolina
Attendance: 1,000

==== Final ====
August 5, 1994
8:00 PM EST

| Charlotte Eagles (North Carolina) | 2-3 | Charleston Battery (South Carolina) |
|---|---|---|
| Graham West (35:34); Jean-Rene Tassy (59:48) | | 20' (pen.) 61:26' Paul Young (23:08) Andy Coggins |

Charlotte Latin Stadium, Charlotte, North Carolina
Attendance: 1,500

August 6, 1994
7:30 PM EST

| Charleston Battery (SC) | 3-1 | Charlotte Eagles (NC) |
|---|---|---|
| Paul Young (41:49); Mario Lone (59:59) | Report | (29:07) Phillipe Berthoud |

Stoney Field, Charleston, South Carolina
Attendance: 2,367 or 2,400
Referee: Clause Staefe

The Charleston Battery advanced.

=== Southeast Division ===
July 30, 1994

| Cocoa Expos (FL) | 7-1 | Orlando Lions (FL) |
|---|---|---|
| David Maury 10' (o.g.); Chris Payne 23'; Richard Sharpe 64', 73' Robin Chan Eric Leibin | Report | (yellow card) (yellow-red card) 62' Andy Restreop; 85' Del Smith |

Cocoa, Florida
Attendance: 2,119 or 500

July 30, 1994

| Atlanta Magic (GA) | 1-0 | Florida Stars (FL) |
|---|---|---|
| Caleb Suri 77' |

Old Roswell High Stadium, Roswell, Georgia

==== Final ====
August 3, 1994
8:00 PM EST

| Atlanta Magic (GA) | 1-0 | Cocoa Expos (FL) |
|---|---|---|
| Caleb Suri 76' |

Old Roswell High Stadium, Roswell, Georgia

August 7, 1994
7:30 PM EST

| Cocoa Expos (FL) | 2-0 | Atlanta Magic (GA) |
|---|---|---|
| Keiran Breslin; Chris Payne |

Varsity Field, Melbourne, Florida

- With the series tied at one game each, the Expos and Magic played a mini-game to determine who would advance.

August 7, 1994
10:00 PM EST

| Cocoa Expos (FL) | 5-1 | Atlanta Magic (GA) |
|---|---|---|
| Richard Sharpe (pen.) (pen.); Eddie Enders; Paul Robertson | | Vince Datillo |

Varsity Field, Melbourne, Florida

The Cocoa Expos advanced.

=== Midwest Division ===
July 30, 1994

| Minnesota Thunder (MN) | 3-2 | St. Louis Knights (MO) |
|---|---|---|
| Gerard Lagos (6:07); Pierre Morice (81:44) | | (49:02) Jeff Davis; (67:57) Tom Stone |

Macalester Stadium, Saint Paul, Minnesota
Attendance: 2,119

July 30, 1994
7:30 CST

| Milwaukee Rampage (WI) | 1-0 OT | Columbus Xoggz (OH) |
|---|---|---|
| Steve Kuntz (red card) 17'; Tony Sanneh (yellow card); Tony Sanneh (yellow card) 57' (red card); Steve Provan 120' | (Report) |

Brown Deer High School, Brown Deer, Wisconsin
Attendance: 1,385

==== Final ====
August 3, 1994
7:30 CST

| Milwaukee Rampage (WI) | 2-3 | Minnesota Thunder (MN) |
|---|---|---|
| Derek Bylsma; Tag Gambatese | Report | 8' Amos Magee; 10' Gerard Lagos 80' Tim Foster |

Brown Deer High School, Brown Deer, Wisconsin
Attendance: 611

August 6, 1994
7:30 CST

| Minnesota Thunder (MN) | 3-1 | Milwaukee Rampage (WI) |
|---|---|---|
| Don Gramenz; Amos Magee; Manny Lagos (79:46) | Report 1 Report 2 | Derek Bylsma |

National Sports Center, Blaine, Minnesota
Attendance: 2,230

The Minnesota Thunder advanced.

=== Midsouth Division ===
July 30, 1994

| Louisville Thoroughbreds (KY) | 1-4 | Lexington Bluegrass Bandits (KY) |
|---|---|---|
| John van Buskirk 42' (pen.) PK | Report | 22', 38' Shane Gibson; 41' Dexter Sandy; 58' Brian Jeffs |

Oldham County High School, Buckner, Kentucky
Attendance: 1,500

July 30, 1994

| New Orleans Riverboat Gamblers (LA) | 0-1 | Birmingham Grasshoppers (AL) |
|---|---|---|
| | | Phil Harden |

Pan American Stadium, New Orleans, Louisiana

==== Final ====
August 5, 1994
7:30 PM EST

| Lexington Bluegrass Bandits (KYLA) | 0-2 | Birmingham Grasshoppers (AL) |
|---|---|---|
| | | Billy Hughes; Jarg Baumgartner |

Woodford County Park
Versailles, Kentucky
Attendance: 1,100

August 7, 1994
5:00 PM EST

| Birmingham Grasshoppers (AL) | 2-1 | Lexington Bluegrass Bandits (KYLA) |
|---|---|---|
| Holder Schneidt; Billy Hughes 84' | Report 1 | Richard Mundy |

Birmingham-Southern College
Birmingham, Alabama
Attendance: 2,200

The Birmingham Grasshoppers advanced.

=== South Central Division ===
July 29, 1994

| Texas Lightning (TX) | 2-3 OT | Austin Lone Stars (TX) |
|---|---|---|
| Corey Hooper; Ron Baskin | | Chris Veselka; Steve Bailey; Lance Reed |

July 30, 1994

| Tulsa Roughnecks (OK) | 1-4 | Austin Lone Stars (TX) |
|---|---|---|
| Virgil Stevens | | Shahram Salami; Gabe Jones; Chris Veselka; JoJo Flemister |

Tulsa, Oklahoma
Attendance: 1,387

July 30, 1994

| San Antonio Pumas (TX) | 3-4 | DFW Toros (TX) |
|---|---|---|
| Marco Ferruzzi; J.D. Stark; Steve Schauer |

==== Final ====
August 5, 1994
8:00 PM CST

| Austin Lone Stars (TX) | 2-4 | DFW Toros (TX) |
|---|---|---|
| Gabe Jones 9'; Judd Willman 16' | Report | 45' Melecio Sanitbanez; 45+1', 54' Heriberto Garcia; 52' Nicolas Arturo Velez |

House Park, Austin, Texas

August 6, 1994
7:30 PM CST

| Austin Lone Stars (TX) | 0-2 | DFW Toros (TX) |
|---|---|---|
| | | Manuel Romero 40'; Nicolas Arturo Velez 80' |

House Park, Austin, Texas

The DFW Toros advanced.

=== Southwest Division ===
July 30, 1994

| El Paso Patriots (TX) | 2-5 | Valley Golden Eagles (CA) |
|---|---|---|
| Arturo Bautista; Steve Guardado | | Raul Haro; Carlos Acosta; Julio Umana |

El Paso, Texas
Attendance: 4,278

July 31, 1994

| East Los Angeles Cobras (CA) | 7-3 | Montclair Standard Falcons (CA) |
|---|---|---|
| Harut Karapetyan; Sean Henderson; Carlos Zavala; Juan Munoz; Sergio Suarez | | Garrett Torres; Eddie Soto; Jesus Artlaga |

Los Angeles

==== Final ====
August 5, 1994

| East Los Angeles Cobras (CA) | 0-6 | Valley Golden Eagles (CA) |
|---|---|---|
| | | Juan Andia; Emerson Mendez; Carlos Acosta; Jose Umana |

Los Angeles

August 7, 1994

| Valley Golden Eagles (CA) | 0-3 | East Los Angeles Cobras (CA) |
|---|---|---|
| | | Jose Vasquez; Harut Karapetyan |

Titan Stadium, Fullerton, California

- With the series tied at one game apiece, the Cobras and Valley Eagles played a minigame to determine who advanced.

August 7, 1994

| Valley Golden Eagles (CA) | 0-2 | East Los Angeles Cobras (CA) |

Titan Stadium, Fullerton, California

The East Los Angeles Cobras advanced.

=== Pacific Division ===
July 30, 1994

| San Francisco United All-Blacks (CA) | 0-1 | Chico Rooks (CA) |
|---|---|---|
| | | Scott Wulferdingen |

July 30, 1994

| North Bay Breakers (CA) | 3-2 | CCV Hydra (CA) |
|---|---|---|
| Craig Ruggels; Roman Ritz; Chris Ziemer | | Luis Berbari; Jose Romas |

==== Final ====
August 5, 1994

| North Bay Breakers (CA) | 2-1 | Chico Rooks (CA) |
|---|---|---|
| Roman Ritz; Chris Ziemer | | Mike Black |

Rohnert Park, California

August 6, 1994

| Chico Rooks (CA) | 2-1 | North Bay Breakers (CA) |
|---|---|---|
| Dean Freeman; Jeremy Gunn | | Roman Ritz |

Chico, California
Attendance: 1,750

- With the series tied at one game apiece, Chico and North Bay played a mini-game to determine who would advance.

August 6, 1994

| Chico Rooks (CA) | 1-0 | North Bay Breakers (CA) |

Chico, California
Attendance: 1,750

The Chico Rooks advanced.

== Sizzlin' Nine Championship ==
=== Greensboro Group ===
| Place | Team | W | L | GF | GA | GD |
|---|---|---|---|---|---|---|
| 1 | Greensboro Dynamo | 2 | 0 | 14 | 3 | +11 |
| 2 | DFW Toros | 1 | 1 | 6 | 9 | -3 |
| 3 | Birmingham Grasshoppers | 0 | 2 | 2 | 10 | -8 |

- Greensboro Dynamo defeated Birmingham Grasshoppers 6–1
- DFW Toros defeated Birmingham Grasshoppers 4–1
- Greensboro Dynamo defeated DFW Toros 8–2
August 10, 1994
6:00 PM EDT

| Greensboro Dynamo | 6–1 | Birmingham Grasshoppers |
|---|---|---|
| Mike Gailey (10:33); Kenny Gasser (28:35); Jason Haupt (31:32); Gabe Garcia (32:13) | Report 1 Report 2 | (30:23) Jorg Baumgartner |

Guilford College Soccer Field
Greensboro, North Carolina
Attendance: 1,041
August 10, 1994
6:00 PM EDT

| Dallas/Fort Worth Toros | 4–1 | Birmingham Grasshoppers |
|---|---|---|
| | Report | Jorg Baumgartner |

Guilford College Soccer Field
Greensboro, North Carolina
Attendance: 108
August 11, 1994
6:00 PM EDT

| Greensboro Dynamo | 8–2 | Dallas/Fort Worth Toros |
|---|---|---|
| Jason Haupt (6:07); Jimmy Glenn (25:33); Eddie Radwanski (34:00); Brian Japp (51:49); Gabe Garcia (53:08); Allen Higgins (55:03) | Report 1 | (16:08) Melesio Santibanez |

Guilford College Soccer Field
Greensboro, North Carolina
Attendance: 1,368

=== Charleston Group ===
| Place | Team | W | L | GF | GA | GD |
|---|---|---|---|---|---|---|
| 1 | Charleston Battery | 2 | 0 | 9 | 2 | +7 |
| 2 | Cocoa Expos | 1 | 1 | 8 | 4 | +4 |
| 3 | Chico Rooks | 0 | 2 | 0 | 11 | -11 |

- Charleston defeated Cocoa 4–2
- Charleston defeated Chico 5–0
- Cocoa defeated Chico 6–0
August 9, 1994
7:30 PM EDT

| Charleston Battery | 4–2 | Cocoa Expos |
|---|---|---|
| Paul Young (25:47); David Hoffman (48:25) | Report | (24:33) Richard Sharpe |

Stoney Field
Charleston, South Carolina
Attendance: 2,012
Referee: Eric Brown
August 10, 1994
7:30 PM EDT

| Charleston Battery | 5–0 | Chico Rooks |
|---|---|---|
| Andrew Coggins (5:05); Garth Pollonais (5:59); Paul Young (28:48); Mario Lone (52:04) | Report |

Stoney Field
Charleston, South Carolina
Attendance: 2,372
Referee: Eric Fink
August 11, 1994
7:30 PM EDT

| Cocoa Expos | 6–0 | Chico Rooks |
|---|---|---|
| Sharpe |

Stoney Field
Charleston, South Carolina

=== Raleigh Group ===
| Place | Team | W | L | GF | GA | GD |
|---|---|---|---|---|---|---|
| 1 | Long Island Rough Riders | 1 | 1 | 10 | 6 | +4 |
| 2 | Minnesota Thunder | 1 | 1 | 6 | 5 | +1 |
| 3 | East Los Angeles Cobras | 1 | 1 | 5 | 10 | -5 |

August 9, 1994

| Minnesota Thunder (MN) | 4-2 | Long Island Rough Riders (NY) |
|---|---|---|
| Pierre Morice 17' (pen.); Gerard Lagos 28' (29:15); Manuel Lagos 50' (pen.) | | 20' (pen.) Chris Armas; 36' Giovanni Savarese |

Broughton High School
Raleigh, North Carolina
Attendance: 175
August 10, 1994

| Minnesota Thunder | 2–3 (SO) (a.e.t.) | East Los Angeles Cobras |
|---|---|---|
| Manuel Lagos 17' (pen.); Gerard Lagos 56' (pen.) | Report 1 | 12' Juan Munoz; (pen.) Jose Vasquez |
Penalties
| Gerard Lagos (penalty scored) | 1–2 | (penalty scored) Rhett Hardy |

Broughton High School
Raleigh, North Carolina
August 11, 1994

| East Los Angeles Cobras | 2–8 | Long Island Rough Riders |
|---|---|---|
| Sean Henderson (26:26); Jose Vasquez | Report 1 Report 2 | 3' Richie Nuttall; 11' Giovanni Savarese; 17' Travis Rinker; 26' Mike Masters; 38' Jim Rooney; Cordt Weinstein |

Broughton High School
Raleigh, North Carolina
- East Los Angeles Cobras defeated Minnesota Thunder 3-2 (SO)
- Long Island Rough Riders defeated East Los Angeles Cobras 8–2

=== Semi-finals ===
August 13, 1994

| Greensboro Dynamo (NC) | 2-1 OT | Long Island Rough Riders (NY) |
|---|---|---|
| Aidan Murphy (28:23); Mike Gosselin 78:47' | Report | (17:16) Mike Masters; (red card) 56' Travis Rinker |

UNCG Soccer Stadium
Greensboro, North Carolina
Attendance: 2,800

August 13, 1994

| Charleston Battery (SC) | 0-5 | Minnesota Thunder (MN) |
|---|---|---|
| | Report | (12:39) Amos Magee (35:18)Manny Lagos (58:58) Mark Abboud |

Stoney Field, Charleston, South Carolina
Attendance: 4,058

== Final ==
August 15, 1994

| Greensboro Dynamo (NC) | 1-1 OT | Minnesota Thunder (MN) |
|---|---|---|
| Mike Gailey 10' | | 46' Gerard Lagos |
Penalties
| Brian Japp (penalty scored) | 2-1 |

UNCG Soccer Stadium, Greensboro, North Carolina
Attendance: 5,159

== Points leaders ==
| Rank | Scorer | Club | GP | Goals | Assists | Points |
|---|---|---|---|---|---|---|
| 1 | (United States) Chris Veselka | Austin Lone Stars | 13 | 30 | 14 | 74 |
| 2 | (England) Richard Sharpe | Cocoa Expos | 15 | 33 | 6 | 72 |
| 3 | (United States) Joey Kirk | Milwaukee Rampage | 18 | 24 | 11 | 59 |
| 4 | (United States) A. J. Jones | Texas Lightning | 14 | 22 | 9 | 53 |
| 4 | (United States) Brian McBride | Milwaukee Rampage | 15 | 18 | 17 | 53 |
| 6 | (United States) Manny Lagos | Minnesota Thunder | 17 | 18 | 9 | 45 |
| 7 | (United States) Tony Sanneh | Milwaukee Rampage | 17 | 14 | 14 | 42 |
| 7 | (Mexico) Salvador Mercado | El Paso Patriots | 18 | 20 | 2 | 42 |
| 8 | (United States) Sheikh N'Dure | Florida Stars | 18 | 17 | 7 | 41 |
| 9 | (United States) Jason Haupt | Greensboro Dynamo | 18 | 15 | 10 | 40 |
| 10 | (United States) Jeff Baicher | CCV Hydra | 16 | 17 | 2 | 36 |
| 11 | (Honduras) Leonel Suazo | Washington Mustangs | 12 | 17 | 0 | 34 |
| 11 | (United States) Mark Weidner | Birmingham Grasshoppers | 16 | | | 34 |
| 11 | (United States) Andrew Ziemer | North Bay Breakers | 16 | | | 34 |

== Honors ==
- MVP: (United States) Manny Lagos
- Points leader: (United States) Chris Veselka, Austin Lone Stars (74 points)
- Goals leader: (England) Richard Sharpe, Cocoa Expos (33 goals)
- Assist Leader: (United States) Wayne Lobring, Louisville Thoroughbreds (21 assists)
- Goalkeeper of the Year: (United States) Kyle Krpata
- Coach of the Year: (United States) Tim Hankinson
