= List of United Soccer League clubs =

Corporate logo of the United Soccer League (USL).

The United Soccer League (USL) has organized soccer (association football) competitions for clubs in the United States league system since 1989. It currently organizes its Championship, League One, and League Two for men, and its Super League and W League for women. It previously organized its SOSL / SISL / USISL (1989–1994), Pro League / Second Division (1995–2010), and Select League / A-League / First Division (1996–2010) for men, and its original W-League (1995–2015) for women. It also previously organized its I-League (1986–1998) and the Major Indoor Soccer League (2011–2014), for men's indoor soccer clubs. Over that time, many clubs have participated in USL competitions in professional, semi-professional, pro–am, and amateur capacities.

== Key ==
| † | Won a top-flight championship (Note: Men's outdoor soccer: USISL (1989–1994), USL Second Division (1995), USL First Division (1996–2010), USL Championship (2011–present); Men's indoor soccer: USISL I-League (1987–1998), Major Indoor Soccer League (2012–2014); Women's soccer: USL W-League (1995–2015), USL W League (2022–2024), USL Super League (2025–present).) | S | USL Super League |
| ‡ | Won a top-flight double (Note: Won both the top-flight championship and regular season championship in a single season.) | ★ | USL Championship |
| Name | Active club | 1 | USL League One |
| Name | Defunct club | 2 | USL League Two |
| | Club based in Antigua and Barbuda | W | USL W League |
| | Club based in Bermuda | | |
| | Club based in Canada | | |
| | Club based in Puerto Rico (Note: Soccer in Puerto Rico is governed by the Puerto Rican Football Federation (FPF), independently of U.S. Soccer.) | | |

== Current clubs ==
In the 2026 season, eight clubs fielded teams in the USL Super League, 25 in the USL Championship, 17 in USL League One, 158 in USL League Two, and 96 in the USL W League. The Charleston Battery, Charlotte Eagles, and Richmond Kickers are the longest-tenured clubs currently playing in the USL, first entering in the 1993 USISL outdoor season. The 92,000-capacity Cotton Bowl, the home ground of future Atlético Dallas and current Dallas Trinity FC, is the largest venue in the USL.

| Club | Location | Home ground | Cap. | League(s) | S | First |
|---|---|---|---|---|---|---|
| AC Connecticut (men) | Danbury, Connecticut | Westside Athletics Complex | 2,500 | 2 | 14 | 2012 |
| AC Connecticut (women) | Danbury, Connecticut | Westside Athletics Complex | 2,500 | W | 5 | 2022 |
| Academica SC | Turlock, California | Academica Soccer Field | 600 | 2 | 4 | 2023 |
| AFC Ann Arbor | Ann Arbor, Michigan | Hollway Field | 5,000 | 2 W | 5 | 2022 |
| AHFC Royals | Houston, Texas | Campbell Road Sports Park | 1,000 | 2 W | 8 | 2018 |
| Akron City FC | Akron, Ohio | Green Street Stadium | 3,000 | 2 | 2 | 2025 |
| Albany Rush | Schenectady, New York | College Park Field | — | 2 | 5 | 2022 |
| AMSG FC | Westminster, California | Boswell Field | 5,500 | 2 W | 3 | 2024 |
| Annapolis Blues FC | Annapolis, Maryland | Memorial Stadium | 34,000 | 2 W | 4 | 2023 |
| Apotheos FC | DeKalb County, Georgia | Atlanta Silverbacks Park | 5,000 | 2 | 2 | 2025 |
| Appalachian FC | Boone, North Carolina | ASU Soccer Stadium | 2,000 | 2 | 1 | 2026 |
| Asheville City SC | Asheville, North Carolina | Greenwood Soccer Field | 3,000 | 2 W | 6 | 2021 |
| Athletic Club Boise | Garden City, Idaho | Stadium at Expo Idaho | 6,225 | 1 (Note: Athletic Club Boise plans to field a team into the USL Super League in the 2027–28 season.) | 1 | 2026 |
| AV Alta FC | Lancaster, California | The Hangar | 5,300 | 1 | 2 | 2025 |
| Ballard FC | Seattle, Washington | Interbay Stadium | 900 | 2 | 5 | 2022 |
| Birmingham Legion FC | Birmingham, Alabama | Protective Stadium | 47,100 | ★ 2 W | 8 | 2019 |
| Black Rock FC | Nashua, New Hampshire | Joanne Merrill Field | — | 2 | 8 | 2018 |
| Boston Bolts | Waltham, Massachusetts | Gordon Field | 1,000 | 2 | 10 | 2016 |
| Boston City FC | Malden, Massachusetts | Brother Gilbert Stadium | 3,500 | 2 | 5 | 2022 |
| Brave SC | The Villages, Florida | H. G. Morse Stadium | 6,000 | 2 | 10 | 2016 |
| Brooklyn FC (men) | New York City, New York | Maimonides Park | 7,000 | ★ | 1 | 2026 |
| Brooklyn FC (women) | New York City, New York | Maimonides Park | 7,000 | S | 2 | 2025 |
| California Storm | Davis, California | Davis Legacy Stadium | — | W | 7 | 1995 |
| Capo FC | San Juan Capistrano, California | JSerra Catholic High School | — | 2 W | 4 | 2023 |
| Carolina Ascent FC | Charlotte, North Carolina | Memorial Stadium | 10,500 | S W | 3 | 2024 |
| Cedar Stars Rush | Teaneck, New Jersey | University Stadium | — | 2 W | 7 | 2019 |
| Charleston Battery † | Mount Pleasant, South Carolina | Patriots Point Soccer Complex | 3,900 | ★ | 34 | 1993 |
| Charlotte Eagles (men) | Matthews, North Carolina | Sportsplex at Matthews | 2,300 | 2 | 33 | 1993 |
| Charlotte Eagles (women) | Matthews, North Carolina | Sportsplex at Matthews | 2,300 | W | 19 | 2000 |
| Charlotte Independence | Charlotte, North Carolina | Memorial Stadium | 10,500 | 1 | 12 | 2015 |
| Charlotte Independence II | Rock Hill, South Carolina | Manchester Meadows | 750 | 2 | 6 | 2021 |
| Chattanooga Red Wolves SC | East Ridge, Tennessee | CHI Memorial Stadium | 2,500 | 1 W (Note: Chattanooga Red Wolves SC plans to field a team into the USL Super League.) | 8 | 2019 |
| Chicago City Dutch Lions | Bridgeview, Illinois | SeatGeek Stadium | 20,000 | 2 | 5 | 2022 |
| Christos FC | Baltimore, Maryland | The Stadium at The House | 1,400 | 2 | 5 | 2022 |
| Cleveland Force SC | Cleveland, Ohio | Krenzler Field | 1,680 | 2 W | 5 | 2022 |
| Colorado Springs Switchbacks FC † | Colorado Springs, Colorado | Weidner Field | 8,000 | ★ | 12 | 2015 |
| Corpus Christi FC | Corpus Christi, Texas | Cabaniss Field | 500 | 1 | 7 | 2018 |
| Dallas Trinity FC | Dallas, Texas | Cotton Bowl | 92,000 | S | 2 | 2025 |
| Davis Legacy SC | Davis, California | Davis Legacy Stadium | — | 2 | 5 | 2022 |
| Dayton Dutch Lions | West Carrollton, Ohio | Dayton Outpatient Center Stadium | 3,500 | 2 W | 17 | 2010 |
| DC Power FC | Washington, D.C. | Audi Field | 20,000 | S | 2 | 2025 |
| Denton Diablos FC | Denton, Texas | Pioneer Soccer Park | 1,200 | 2 | 2 | 2025 |
| Des Moines Menace | West Des Moines, Iowa | Valley Stadium | 14,557 | 2 | 31 | 1994 |
| Detroit City FC | Hamtramck, Michigan | Keyworth Stadium | 7,933 | ★ W | 5 | 2022 |
| Dothan United Soccer Club | Dothan, Alabama | Rip Hewes Stadium | 10,000 | 2 | 3 | 2024 |
| East Atlanta FC | Rockdale County, Georgia | RYSA Soccer Complex | — | 2 | 6 | 2021 |
| Edgewater Castle FC | Chicago, Illinois | Winnemac Stadium | — | 2 W | 1 | 2026 |
| El Paso Locomotive FC | El Paso, Texas | Southwest University Park | 7,500 | ★ | 8 | 2019 |
| FC Buffalo (men) | Buffalo, New York | All-High Stadium | 5,000 | 2 | 4 | 2023 |
| FC Buffalo (women) | Buffalo, New York | All-High Stadium | 5,000 | W | 2 | 2025 |
| FC Miami City | Lauderhill, Florida | Central Broward Park | 25,000 | 2 | 10 | 2015 |
| FC Motown STA | Madison, New Jersey | Ranger Stadium | 1,200 | 2 | 6 | 2021 |
| FC Naples | Naples, Florida | Paradise Coast Sports Complex | 5,000 | 1 | 2 | 2025 |
| FC Olympia | Lacey, Washington | South Sound Stadium | 1,800 | 2 W | 5 | 2022 |
| FC Tucson | Tucson, Arizona | Kino Sports Complex | 3,200 | 2 | 15 | 2012 |
| FC Tulsa | Tulsa, Oklahoma | Oneok Field | 7,833 | ★ | 12 | 2015 |
| Flatirons FC | Golden, Colorado | Stermole Stadium | 550 | 2 W | 6 | 2021 |
| Flint City Bucks | Flint, Michigan | Atwood Stadium | 11,000 | 2 | 30 | 1996 |
| Flower City 1872 | Rochester, New York | RCSC Stadium | 13,768 | W | 2 | 2025 |
| Fort Lauderdale United FC | Fort Lauderdale, Florida | Beyond Bancard Field | 5,000 | S 2 W (Note: Fort Lauderdale United FC plans to field a team into USL League One in the 2027 season.) | 2 | 2025 |
| Fort Wayne FC | Fort Wayne, Indiana | Fort Wayne FC Park | 9,200 | 1 | 6 | 2021 |
| Fort Worth Vaqueros FC | River Oaks, Texas | W.O. Barnes Stadium | 4,560 | 2 | 1 | 2026 |
| Forward Madison FC | Madison, Wisconsin | Breese Stevens Field | 5,000 | 1 | 8 | 2019 |
| Greenville Triumph SC | Greenville, South Carolina | Paladin Stadium | 16,000 | 1 | 8 | 2019 |
| Hartford Athletic | Hartford, Connecticut | Trinity Health Stadium | 5,500 | ★ W | 8 | 2019 |
| Hickory FC | Hickory, North Carolina | Moretz Stadium | 7,200 | 2 | 1 | 2026 |
| Hill Country Lobos | Mountain City, Texas | Bob Shelton Stadium | 8,800 | 2 W | 3 | 2024 |
| Houston FC | Houston, Texas | Westbury Christian School | 5,000 | 2 | 9 | 2017 |
| Indy Eleven † | Indianapolis, Indiana | Michael A. Carroll Stadium (Note: Indy Eleven's women's team plays their home games at the 1,000-capacity Grand Park in Indianapolis, Indiana.) | 12,111 | ★ W (Note: Indy Eleven plans to field a team into the USL Super League.) | 9 | 2018 |
| Kalamazoo FC | Kalamazoo, Michigan | Soisson-Rapacz-Clason Field | 2,200 | 2 W | 6 | 2021 |
| Lancaster Inferno FC | Lancaster, Pennsylvania | Tylus Field | 2,000 | W | 3 | 2024 |
| Laredo Heat | Laredo, Texas | PEG Energy Stadium | 1,200 | 2 | 2 | 2025 |
| Las Vegas Lights FC | Las Vegas, Nevada | Cashman Field | 9,334 | ★ | 9 | 2018 |
| Lehigh Valley United | Allentown, Pennsylvania | Scotty Wood Stadium | 3,000 | 2 | 11 | 2015 |
| Lexington SC (men) | Lexington, Kentucky | Lexington SC Stadium | 7,500 | ★ | 4 | 2023 |
| Lexington SC (women) † | Lexington, Kentucky | Lexington SC Stadium | 7,500 | S | 2 | 2025 |
| Lionsbridge FC | Newport News, Virginia | TowneBank Stadium | 4,200 | 2 | 8 | 2018 |
| Little Rock Rangers | Little Rock, Arkansas | War Memorial Stadium | 54,120 | 2 | 6 | 2021 |
| Long Island Rough Riders (men) † | Hempstead, New York | Hofstra University Soccer Stadium | 1,600 | 2 | 32 | 1994 |
| Long Island Rough Riders (women) ‡ | Uniondale, New York | Mitchel Athletic Complex | 1,600 | W | 26 | 1995 |
| Lorain County Leviathan FC | Avon, Ohio | ForeFront Field | 5,000 | 2 | 1 | 2026 |
| Los Angeles SC | Covina, California | Charter Oak High School | — | W | 1 | 2026 |
| Lubbock Matadors SC | Lubbock, Texas | Lowry Field | 8,500 | 2 | 1 | 2026 |
| Loudoun United FC | Leesburg, Virginia | Segra Field | 5,000 | ★ 2 W | 8 | 2019 |
| Louisiana Krewe FC | Lafayette, Louisiana | Home Bank Soccer/Track Facility | 5,000 | 2 | 5 | 2022 |
| Louisville City FC † | Louisville, Kentucky | Lynn Family Stadium | 15,304 | ★ | 12 | 2015 |
| Louisville City U-23 | Louisville, Kentucky | Lynn Family Training Center | — | 2 | 1 | 2026 |
| Manhattan SC | New York City, New York | Gaelic Park | 2,000 | 2 W | 7 | 2019 |
| Miami FC | Miami, Florida | Pitbull Stadium | 20,000 | ★ | 7 | 2020 |
| Midlakes United | Bellevue, Washington | Bellevue College Soccer Field | — | 2 | 3 | 2024 |
| Midwest United FC | Kentwood, Michigan | Midwest United FC Complex | — | 2 W | 5 | 2022 |
| Minneapolis City SC | Minneapolis, Minnesota | Edor Nelson Field | 1,400 | 2 | 5 | 2022 |
| Minnesota Aurora FC | Eagan, Minnesota | TCO Performance Center | 6,000 | W | 5 | 2022 |
| Mississippi Brilla FC | Clinton, Mississippi | Clinton Arrow Stadium | 4,000 | 2 | 19 | 2007 |
| Monterey Bay FC (Note: Monterey Bay FC played in Fresno, California as Fresno FC from 2018 to 2019.) | Seaside, California | Cardinale Stadium | 6,000 | ★ W | 7 | 2018 |
| Montgomery United FC | Montgomery, Alabama | Championship Stadium | 4,000 | 2 | 2 | 2025 |
| Morris Elite SC | Newark, New Jersey | Fredrick Douglass Field | — | 2 W | 6 | 2021 |
| NEFC | Worcester, Massachusetts | Alumni Stadium | 2,000 | 2 (Note: NEFC plans to field a team into the USL W League in the 2026 season.) | 2 | 2025 |
| New England Mutiny | Ludlow, Massachusetts | Lusitano Stadium | 3,000 | W | 4 | 1999 |
| New Jersey Copa FC | Metuchen, New Jersey | St. Joseph High School | — | 2 W | 6 | 2021 |
| New Mexico United | Albuquerque, New Mexico | Isotopes Park | 13,500 | ★ | 8 | 2019 |
| New York Cosmos | Paterson, New Jersey | Hinchliffe Stadium | 10,000 | 1 (Note: The New York Cosmos plan to field a team into the USL Super League in the 2027–28 season.) | 1 | 2026 |
| North Carolina Courage U23 † | Cary, North Carolina | WakeMed Soccer Park | 10,000 | W | 5 | 2022 |
| North Carolina FC (Note: North Carolina FC are on hiatus, and are planning to return in the 2028 season.) | Raleigh, North Carolina | TBD | — | ★ | 11 | 2018 |
| North Carolina FC U23 | Cary, North Carolina | WakeMed Soccer Park | 10,000 | 2 | 18 | 2002 |
| Northern Virginia FC | Leesburg, Virginia | Segra Field | 5,000 | 2 W | 27 | 1998 |
| Ocean City Nor'easters | Ocean City, New Jersey | Carey Stadium | 4,000 | 2 | 29 | 1997 |
| Oakland County FC | Royal Oak, Michigan | Royal Oak High School | 2,000 | 2 | 6 | 2021 |
| Oakland Roots SC | Oakland, California | Oakland Coliseum | 15,000 | ★ | 6 | 2021 |
| Oakland Soul SC | Oakland, California | Merritt College Soccer Stadium | 3,451 | W (Note: Oakland Soul SC plans to field a team into the USL Super League.) | 4 | 2023 |
| OKC for Soccer (Note: OKC for Soccer are planning to return in the 2027 season.) | Oklahoma City, Oklahoma | Oklahoma City Stadium | 10,000 | ★ (Note: OKC for Soccer plans to field a team into USL League Two in the 2027 season.) | 8 | 2014 |
| One Knoxville SC | Knoxville, Tennessee | Covenant Health Park | 7,000 | 1 W | 5 | 2022 |
| Orange County SC † | Irvine, California | Championship Soccer Stadium | 5,500 | ★ | 16 | 2011 |
| Peoria City | Peoria, Illinois | Shea Stadium | 3,800 | 2 | 5 | 2022 |
| Philadelphia Lone Star FC | Philadelphia, Pennsylvania | TBD | — | 2 | 5 | 2021 |
| Phoenix Rising FC † | Phoenix, Arizona | Phoenix Rising Soccer Stadium | 10,000 | ★ | 13 | 2014 |
| Pittsburgh Riverhounds SC † | Pittsburgh, Pennsylvania | Highmark Stadium | 5,000 | ★ | 27 | 1999 |
| Pittsburgh Riverhounds 2 | Pittsburgh, Pennsylvania | Highmark Stadium | 5,000 | 2 | 4 | 2014 |
| Pittsburgh Riveters SC | Pittsburgh, Pennsylvania | Highmark Stadium | 5,000 | W | 2 | 2025 |
| Port City FC | Wilmington, North Carolina | Legion Stadium | 6,000 | 2 W | 1 | 2026 |
| Portland Bangers FC | Portland, Oregon | Hilken Community Stadium | 1,000 | 2 | 2 | 2025 |
| Portland Cherry Bombs FC | Portland, Oregon | Hilken Community Stadium | 1,000 | W | 1 | 2026 |
| Portland Hearts of Pine | Portland, Maine | Fitzpatrick Stadium | 6,300 | 1 | 2 | 2025 |
| Project 51O | Alameda, California | UCSF Benioff Training Facility | — | 2 | 6 | 2021 |
| Racing Louisville FC | Louisville, Kentucky | Lynn Family Training Center | — | W | 5 | 2022 |
| Rally Madison FC | Madison, Wisconsin | Breese Stevens Field | 5,000 | W (Note: Rally Madison FC plans to field a team into the USL Super League.) | 1 | 2026 |
| Reading United AC | Reading, Pennsylvania | Alvernia University Turf Field | — | 2 | 30 | 1996 |
| Real Central New Jersey | Lawrence Township, New Jersey | Ben Cohen Field | 1,000 | 2 | 6 | 2021 |
| Real Colorado | Meridian, Colorado | Real Colorado Soccer Complex | — | 2 W | 16 | 2000 |
| Red River FC | Shreveport, Louisiana | Airline High School Stadium | 7,000 | 2 | 5 | 2022 |
| Redlands FC | Redlands, California | Dodge Stadium | 6,000 | 2 | 4 | 2023 |
| Rhode Island FC | Pawtucket, Rhode Island | Tidewater Landing Stadium | 10,500 | ★ | 3 | 2024 |
| Richmond Kickers | Richmond, Virginia | City Stadium | 6,000 | 1 | 34 | 1993 |
| Rochester FC | Rochester, Minnesota | Rochester Regional Stadium | 5,000 | 2 W | 4 | 2023 |
| Rockford Raptors | Winnebago County, Illinois | Mercyhealth Sportscore | — | 2 W | 8 | 1994 |
| Sacramento Republic FC † | Sacramento, California | Heart Health Park | 11,569 | ★ | 13 | 2014 |
| Salem City FC † | Bermuda Run, North Carolina | Truist Sports Park | 1,600 | 2 W | 32 | 1993 |
| Salmon Bay FC | Seattle, Washington | Interbay Stadium | 900 | W | 2 | 2025 |
| San Antonio FC ‡ | San Antonio, Texas | Toyota Field | 8,296 | ★ 2 | 11 | 2016 |
| San Francisco City FC | San Francisco, California | Kezar Stadium | 10,000 | 2 | 9 | 2016 |
| San Francisco Glens | San Francisco, California | Treasure Island Stadium | 1,500 | 2 | 7 | 2018 |
| Santa Clarita Blue Heat | Santa Clarita, California | Reese Field | — | W | 9 | 2008 |
| Santafé Wanderers FC | Kansas City, Missouri | Durwood Soccer Stadium | 850 | 2 | 2 | 2025 |
| Sarasota Paradise | Lakewood Ranch, Florida | Premier Sports Campus | — | 1 | 4 | 2023 |
| SC United Bantams | Columbia, South Carolina | SE Freight Lines Soccer Center | — | 2 W | 14 | 2012 |
| Seacoast United Phantoms | Epping, New Hampshire | Seacoast United Outdoor Complex | — | 2 | 30 | 1996 |
| Sioux Falls City FC | Sioux Falls, South Dakota | Bob Young Field | 5,000 | W | 2 | 2025 |
| Snohomish United | Snohomish, Washington | Stocker Fields | — | 2 W | 2 | 2025 |
| SoCal Reds FC | Irvine, California | TBD | — | W | 1 | 2026 |
| Southern California Eagles | Whittier, California | Whittier College Memorial Stadium | 7,000 | 2 | 24 | 2001 |
| Southern Soccer Academy | Mableton, Georgia | Marathon Park | 1,000 | 2 W | 6 | 2021 |
| Spokane Velocity | Spokane, Washington | One Spokane Stadium | 5,000 | 1 | 3 | 2024 |
| Sporting Club Jacksonville (men) | Jacksonville, Florida | Hodges Stadium | 12,000 | ★ | 1 | 2026 |
| Sporting Club Jacksonville (women) | Jacksonville, Florida | Hodges Stadium | 12,000 | S | 2 | 2025 |
| Sporting JAX Soccer Academy | Jacksonville, Florida | Mandarin High School | — | 2 W | 7 | 2019 |
| St. Louis Ambush | Creve Coeur, Missouri | Spartan Field | 1,000 | 2 | 2 | 2025 |
| Steel City FC | Cheswick, Pennsylvania | Founders Field | 1,500 | 2 W | 2 | 2025 |
| Sunflower State FC | Kansas City, Missouri | The Pembroke Hill School | 900 | 2 | 2 | 2025 |
| Tacoma Stars | Tacoma, Washington | Bellarmine Memorial Stadium | — | 2 W | 3 | 2024 |
| Tampa Bay Rowdies | St. Petersburg, Florida | Al Lang Stadium | 7,227 | ★ | 11 | 2017 |
| Tampa Bay Sun FC | Tampa, Florida | Riverfront Stadium | 5,000 | S | 2 | 2025 |
| Texoma FC | Sherman, Texas | Munson Stadium | 5,139 | 2 | 2 | 2025 |
| Tobacco Road FC | Durham, North Carolina | Durham County Memorial Stadium | 8,500 | 2 | 7 | 2019 |
| Toledo Villa FC | Toledo, Ohio | Paul Hotmer Field | — | 2 W | 6 | 2021 |
| Tormenta FC (men) (Note: Tormenta FC's men's team are currently on hiatus.) | Statesboro, Georgia | Tormenta Stadium | 3,500 | 1 | 10 | 2016 |
| Tormenta FC (women) † | Statesboro, Georgia | Tormenta Stadium | 3,500 | W | 5 | 2022 |
| Twin City Toucans FC | Bryan, Texas | Edible Field | 2,000 | 2 | 9 | 2017 |
| Union Omaha | Omaha, Nebraska | Morrison Stadium | 6,000 | 1 | 7 | 2020 |
| Utah United | Orem, Utah | Clyde Field | 3,000 | 2 W | 3 | 2024 |
| Ventura County Fusion | Ventura, California | Ventura College Sportsplex | 3,000 | 2 | 18 | 2007 |
| Vermont Green FC | Burlington, Vermont | Virtue Field | 2,600 | 2 W | 5 | 2022 |
| Virginia Beach United FC | Virginia Beach, Virginia | Virginia Beach Sportsplex | 6,000 | 2 W | 7 | 2019 |
| Wake FC | Holly Springs, North Carolina | Ting Stadium | 1,800 | 2 W | 7 | 2019 |
| West Chester United SC | King of Prussia, Pennsylvania | YSC Sports | — | 2 | 6 | 2021 |
| West Seattle Junction FC | Seattle, Washington | Nino Cantu Athletics Complex | 4,000 | 2 W | 3 | 2024 |
| West Texas FC | Midland, Texas | Astound Broadband Stadium | 18,000 | 2 | 9 | 2009 |
| West Virginia United | Charleston, West Virginia | Welch Athletic Complex | — | 2 | 23 | 2003 |
| Westchester Flames | New Rochelle, New York | City Park Stadium | 1,845 | 2 | 27 | 1999 |
| Westchester SC | Mount Vernon, New York | The Stadium at Memorial Field | 3,900 | 1 | 2 | 2025 |
| Western Mass Pioneers | Ludlow, Massachusetts | Lusitano Stadium | 3,000 | 2 | 28 | 1998 |
| Weston FC | Weston, Florida | Cypress Bay High School | — | 2 | 9 | 2017 |
| Club | Location | Home ground | Cap. | League(s) | S | First |

== Future clubs ==
| Club | Location | Home ground | Cap. | League(s) | First |
|---|---|---|---|---|---|
| Atlético Dallas | Dallas, Texas | Cotton Bowl | 92,000 | ★ | 2027 |
| Buffalo Pro Soccer | Buffalo, New York | TBD | — | S ★ | TBD |
| Ozark United FC | Rogers, Arkansas | Ozark United Stadium | 5,000 | S ★ | 2028 |
| Port St. Lucie SC | Port St. Lucie, Florida | Walton & One Stadium | 6,000 | 1 | 2027 |
| Reno Pro Soccer | Reno, Nevada | Reno Soccer Stadium | 6,000 | ★ | 2028 |
| Rodeo SC | Celina, Texas | Bearcat Stadium | 7,000 | 1 | 2028 |
| Sporting Cascades FC | Eugene, Oregon | Civic Park | 3,500 | 1 | 2027 |

== Past clubs ==
| Club | Location | Division(s) | | | | | S | First | Last | Fate |
| Club | Location | D1 | D2 | D3 | Am | In | S | First | Last | Fate |
|---|---|---|---|---|---|---|---|---|---|---|
| Antigua Barracuda FC (Antigua and Barbuda) | Osbourn, Antigua | | | ⚽️ | | | 3 | 2011 | 2013 | Folded |
| Arizona Sahuaros | El Mirage, Arizona | | | ⚽️ | ⚽️ | | 13 | 1990 | 2002 | Moved to NPSL |
| Arkansas Diamonds | Little Rock, Arkansas | | | ⚽️ | ⚽️ | ⚽️ | 5 | 1990 | 1995 | Folded |
| Atlanta Express | Lawrenceville, Georgia | | | | ⚽️ | ⚽️ | 2 | 1991 | 1992 | Folded |
| Atlanta Magic ‡ | Atlanta, Georgia | | | ⚽️ | ⚽️ | ⚽️ | 5 | 1992 | 1996 | Folded |
| Atlanta Silverbacks FC | DeKalb County, Georgia | | ⚽️ | | | | 12 | 1997 | 2008 | Moved to NASL |
| Atlanta United 2 | Kennesaw, Georgia | | ⚽️ | | | | 5 | 2018 | 2022 | Moved to MLSNP |
| Austin Bold FC (Note: Austin Bold FC played as the Austin Aztex from 2012 to 2015.) | Austin, Texas | | ⚽️ | | ⚽️ | | 7 | 2015 | 2021 | Folded |
| Austin Lone Stars | Austin, Texas | | | ⚽️ | ⚽️ | ⚽️ | 13 | 1988 | 2000 | Folded |
| Baltimore Bays ‡ | Baltimore, Maryland | | | ⚽️ | ⚽️ | ⚽️ | 7 | 1993 | 1999 | Folded |
| Baltimore Blast ‡ | Towson, Maryland | | | | | ⚽️ | 3 | 2012 | 2014 | Moved to MASL |
| Bermuda Hogges F.C. | Pembroke, Bermuda | | | ⚽️ | ⚽️ | | 6 | 2007 | 2012 | Folded |
| Boca Raton Sabres | Boca Raton, Florida | | | ⚽️ | ⚽️ | | 3 | 1992 | 1994 | Folded |
| Boston Bulldogs | Framingham, Massachusetts | | ⚽️ | ⚽️ | | ⚽️ | 6 | 1996 | 2001 | Folded |
| Calgary Mustangs (Canada) | Calgary, Alberta | | ⚽️ | | ⚽️ | | 4 | 2001 | 2004 | Folded |
| California Gold | San Francisco, California | | | ⚽️ | ⚽️ | | 5 | 2002 | 2006 | Folded |
| California Jaguars † | Salinas, California | | ⚽️ | ⚽️ | | | 5 | 1995 | 1999 | Folded |
| California Victory | San Francisco, California | | ⚽️ | | | | 1 | 2007 | 2007 | Folded |
| Cape Cod Crusaders | Buzzards Bay, Massachusetts | | ⚽️ | ⚽️ | ⚽️ | | 15 | 1994 | 2008 | Folded |
| Cascade Surge | Salem, Oregon | | | ⚽️ | ⚽️ | | 15 | 1995 | 2009 | Folded |
| Central California Valley Hydra | Stockton, California | | | ⚽️ | | | 3 | 1994 | 1996 | Folded |
| Central Valley Fuego FC | Fresno, California | | | ⚽️ | | | 3 | 2022 | 2024 | Independence |
| Chattanooga Express | Chattanooga, Tennessee | | | ⚽️ | ⚽️ | ⚽️ | 6 | 1992 | 1997 | Folded |
| Chicago Sockers | Schaumburg, Illinois | | ⚽️ | ⚽️ | ⚽️ | | 6 | 1995 | 2000 | Folded |
| Chicago Soul FC | Hoffman Estates, Illinois | | | | | ⚽️ | 1 | 2013 | 2013 | Folded |
| Chico Rooks | Chico, California | | | ⚽️ | ⚽️ | | 10 | 1993 | 2002 | Moved to NPSL |
| Cincinnati Cheetahs | Springfield, Ohio | | | ⚽️ | | | 2 | 1994 | 1995 | Folded |
| Cincinnati Kings | Wilder, Kentucky | | | ⚽️ | ⚽️ | | 8 | 2005 | 2012 | Folded |
| Cincinnati Riverhawks | Kings Mills, Ohio | | ⚽️ | | ⚽️ | | 7 | 1997 | 2003 | Folded |
| Cleveland City Stars | Bedford, Ohio | | ⚽️ | ⚽️ | | | 1 | 2009 | 2009 | Folded |
| Cocoa Expos | Cocoa, Florida | | | ⚽️ | ⚽️ | ⚽️ | 14 | 1994 | 2007 | Folded |
| Colorado Comets ‡ | Denver, Colorado | | | | ⚽️ | ⚽️ | 7 | 1989 | 2000 | Folded |
| Colorado Foxes | Commerce City, Colorado | | ⚽️ | | | | 5 | 1997 | 2001 | Folded |
| Columbia Heat | Columbia, South Carolina | | | ⚽️ | ⚽️ | | 3 | 1993 | 1995 | Folded |
| Columbus Xoggz | Dublin, Ohio | | ⚽️ | ⚽️ | | | 3 | 1994 | 1996 | Folded |
| Connecticut Wolves | New Britain, Connecticut | | ⚽️ | ⚽️ | ⚽️ | ⚽️ | 10 | 1993 | 2002 | Folded |
| Crystal Palace Baltimore | Towson, Maryland | | | ⚽️ | | | 3 | 2007 | 2009 | Moved to NASL |
| Dallas Lightning | Dallas, Texas | | | ⚽️ | ⚽️ | ⚽️ | 4 | 1993 | 1996 | Folded |
| Dallas Rockets † | Richardson, Texas | | | | ⚽️ | ⚽️ | 5 | 1990 | 1994 | Folded |
| Delaware Wizards | Wilmington, Delaware | | ⚽️ | ⚽️ | ⚽️ | ⚽️ | 8 | 1993 | 2000 | Folded |
| Detroit Wheels | Pontiac, Michigan | | | ⚽️ | ⚽️ | | 2 | 1994 | 1995 | Folded |
| DFW Tornados ‡ | Frisco, Texas | | | ⚽️ | ⚽️ | ⚽️ | 24 | 1987 | 2010 | Folded |
| East Bay Red Riders | Oakland, California | | | | ⚽️ | | 2 | 1992 | 1993 | Folded |
| East Los Angeles Cobras | East Los Angeles, California | | | ⚽️ | ⚽️ | | 3 | 1993 | 1995 | Folded |
| Edmonton Aviators (Canada) | Edmonton, Alberta | | ⚽️ | | | | 1 | 2004 | 2004 | Folded |
| El Paso Patriots | El Paso, Texas | | ⚽️ | ⚽️ | ⚽️ | ⚽️ | 24 | 1990 | 2013 | Folded |
| F.C. New York | New York City, New York | | | ⚽️ | | | 1 | 2011 | 2011 | Moved to NPSL |
| FC Cincinnati | Cincinnati, Ohio | | ⚽️ | ⚽️ | | | 3 | 2016 | 2018 | Moved to MLS |
| FC Montreal (Canada) | Montreal, Quebec | | | ⚽️ | | | 2 | 2014 | 2015 | Folded |
| Fort Lauderdale CF | Fort Lauderdale, Florida | | | ⚽️ | | | 2 | 2020 | 2021 | Moved to MLSNP |
| Greenville Lions | Greenville, South Carolina | | | ⚽️ | ⚽️ | | 3 | 2001 | 2003 | Folded |
| Harrisburg City Islanders | Harrisburg, Pennsylvania | | ⚽️ | ⚽️ | | | 15 | 2004 | 2018 | Folded |
| Hawaii Tsunami | Honolulu, Hawaii | | | ⚽️ | | | 4 | 1994 | 1997 | Folded |
| Hershey Wildcats | Hershey, Pennsylvania | | ⚽️ | | | | 5 | 1997 | 2001 | Folded |
| Houston Hurricanes | Houston, Texas | | | ⚽️ | | | 5 | 1996 | 2000 | Independence |
| Indiana Blast | Indianapolis, Indiana | | ⚽️ | ⚽️ | ⚽️ | | 8 | 1997 | 2004 | Folded |
| Jacksonville Cyclones | Jacksonville, Florida | | ⚽️ | ⚽️ | | | 5 | 1995 | 1999 | Folded |
| LA Galaxy II | Carson, California | | ⚽️ | ⚽️ | | | 9 | 2014 | 2022 | Moved to MLSNP |
| Lansing Ignite FC | Lansing, Michigan | | | ⚽️ | | | 1 | 2019 | 2019 | Folded |
| Lehigh Valley Steam | Lehigh Valley, Pennsylvania | | ⚽️ | | | | 1 | 1999 | 1999 | Expelled |
| Lexington Bluegrass Bandits | Lexington, Kentucky | | | ⚽️ | ⚽️ | | 6 | 1994 | 2000 | Folded |
| Maryland Mania | Catonsville, Maryland | | ⚽️ | | | | 1 | 1999 | 1999 | Folded |
| Memphis 901 FC | Memphis, Tennessee | | ⚽️ | | | | 6 | 2019 | 2024 | Folded |
| Memphis Jackals | Memphis, Tennessee | | | ⚽️ | ⚽️ | ⚽️ | 4 | 1991 | 1994 | Folded |
| Miami FC | Fort Lauderdale, Florida | | ⚽️ | | | | 4 | 2006 | 2009 | Moved to NASL |
| Milwaukee Rampage † | Milwaukee, Wisconsin | | ⚽️ | ⚽️ | | | 9 | 1994 | 2002 | Folded |
| Milwaukee Wave † | Milwaukee, Wisconsin | | | | | ⚽️ | 3 | 2012 | 2014 | Moved to MASL |
| Milwaukee Wave United | Milwaukee, Wisconsin | | ⚽️ | | | | 2 | 2003 | 2004 | Folded |
| Minnesota Thunder † | Blaine, Minnesota | | ⚽️ | ⚽️ | | | 16 | 1994 | 2009 | Folded |
| Missouri Comets † | Independence, Missouri | | | | | ⚽️ | 3 | 2012 | 2014 | Moved to MASL |
| MLS Project-40 | No home ground | | ⚽️ | | | | 3 | 1998 | 2000 | Folded |
| Montreal Impact (Canada) † | Montreal, Quebec | | ⚽️ | | | | 12 | 1997 | 2009 | Moved to NASL |
| Myrtle Beach Boyz | Myrtle Beach, South Carolina | | | ⚽️ | | | 1 | 1995 | 1995 | Folded |
| Myrtle Beach Seadawgs | Myrtle Beach, South Carolina | | | ⚽️ | | | 3 | 1997 | 1999 | Folded |
| Nashville Metros | Nashville, Tennessee | | ⚽️ | ⚽️ | ⚽️ | | 22 | 1991 | 2012 | Folded |
| Nashville SC | Nashville, Tennessee | | ⚽️ | | | | 2 | 2018 | 2019 | Moved to MLS |
| New England Revolution II | Foxborough, Massachusetts | | | ⚽️ | | | 2 | 2020 | 2021 | Moved to MLSNP |
| New Hampshire Ramblers | New Hampshire | | | ⚽️ | | | 1 | 1995 | 1995 | Folded |
| New Jersey Stallions | Wayne, New Jersey | | ⚽️ | ⚽️ | ⚽️ | | 9 | 1996 | 2004 | Folded |
| New Mexico Chiles | Albuquerque, New Mexico | | ⚽️ | ⚽️ | ⚽️ | ⚽️ | 10 | 1987 | 1996 | Folded |
| New Orleans Storm | New Orleans, Louisiana | | ⚽️ | ⚽️ | ⚽️ | | 7 | 1993 | 1999 | Folded |
| New York Fever | Valhalla, New York | | | ⚽️ | | | 2 | 1994 | 1995 | Merged |
| New York Red Bulls II ‡ | Montclair, New Jersey | | ⚽️ | ⚽️ | | | 8 | 2015 | 2022 | Moved to MLSNP |
| Norfolk SharX | Norfolk, Virginia | | | | | ⚽️ | 1 | 2012 | 2012 | Folded |
| North Bay Breakers | Santa Rosa, California | | | ⚽️ | ⚽️ | | 2 | 1994 | 1995 | Folded |
| North Jersey Imperials | Paramus, New Jersey | | | ⚽️ | ⚽️ | | 7 | 1994 | 2001 | Folded |
| North Texas SC | Arlington, Texas | | | ⚽️ | | | 3 | 2019 | 2021 | Moved to MSLNP |
| Northern Colorado Hailstorm FC | Windsor, Colorado | | | ⚽️ | | | 3 | 2022 | 2024 | Expelled |
| Northern Nevada Aces | Reno, Nevada | | | ⚽️ | | | 2 | 2001 | 2002 | Moved to NPSL |
| Oklahoma City Alliance | Oklahoma City, Oklahoma | | | | | ⚽️ | 2 | 1997 | 1998 | Folded |
| Oklahoma City Slickers | Oklahoma City, Oklahoma | | | ⚽️ | ⚽️ | ⚽️ | 3 | 1994 | 1996 | Folded |
| Oklahoma City Warriors ‡ | Oklahoma City, Oklahoma | | | | ⚽️ | ⚽️ | 7 | 1987 | 1993 | Merged |
| Orange County Blue Star | Irvine, California | | ⚽️ | | ⚽️ | | 16 | 1997 | 2012 | Folded |
| Orlando City B | Kissimmee, Florida | | ⚽️ | ⚽️ | | | 4 | 2016 | 2020 | Moved to MLSNP |
| Orlando City SC ‡ (Note: Orlando City SC played in Austin, Texas as Austin Aztex FC from 2008 to 2010.) | Orlando, Florida | | | ⚽️ | | | 6 | 2009 | 2014 | Moved to MLS |
| Orlando Lions | Orlando, Florida | | | ⚽️ | ⚽️ | ⚽️ | 5 | 1992 | 1996 | Folded |
| Orlando Nighthawks | Orlando, Florida | | | ⚽️ | ⚽️ | | 3 | 1997 | 1999 | Folded |
| Orlando Sundogs | Orlando, Florida | | ⚽️ | | | | 1 | 1997 | 1997 | Expelled |
| Ottawa Fury FC (Canada) | Ottawa, Ontario | | ⚽️ | | ⚽️ | | 12 | 2005 | 2019 | Folded |
| Pennsylvania Roar | Reading, Pennsylvania | | | | | ⚽️ | 1 | 2014 | 2014 | Folded |
| Pensacola Barracudas | Pensacola, Florida | | | ⚽️ | | | 1 | 1998 | 1998 | Folded |
| Philadelphia Freedom | Philadelphia, Pennsylvania | | | ⚽️ | | ⚽️ | 4 | 1994 | 1997 | Folded |
| Philadelphia Union II | Chester, Pennsylvania | | ⚽️ | ⚽️ | | | 5 | 2016 | 2020 | Moved to MLSNP |
| Phoenix FC | Tempe, Arizona | | | ⚽️ | | | 1 | 2013 | 2013 | Expelled |
| Portland Timbers | Portland, Oregon | | ⚽️ | | | | 10 | 2001 | 2010 | Moved to MLS |
| Portland Timbers 2 | Portland, Oregon | | ⚽️ | ⚽️ | | | 6 | 2015 | 2020 | Moved to MLSNP |
| Puerto Rico Islanders † | Bayamón, Puerto Rico | | ⚽️ | | | | 7 | 2004 | 2010 | Moved to NASL |
| Puerto Rico United | Aguada, Puerto Rico | | | ⚽️ | | | 1 | 2010 | 2010 | Expelled |
| Puget Sound Gunners FC (Note: Puget Sound Gunners FC played in Yakima, Washington as the Yakima Reds from 1995 to 2010.) | Issaquah, Washington | | | ⚽️ | ⚽️ | | 21 | 1995 | 2015 | Folded |
| Raleigh Express | Raleigh, North Carolina | | ⚽️ | ⚽️ | ⚽️ | | 8 | 1993 | 2000 | Folded |
| Real Maryland F.C. | Rockville, Maryland | | | ⚽️ | ⚽️ | | 5 | 2008 | 2012 | Folded |
| Real Monarchs † | Herriman, Utah | | ⚽️ | ⚽️ | | | 7 | 2015 | 2021 | Moved to MLSNP |
| Reno 1868 FC | Reno, Nevada | | ⚽️ | | | | 4 | 2017 | 2020 | Folded |
| Reno Rattlers | Reno, Nevada | | ⚽️ | ⚽️ | | | 5 | 1994 | 1998 | Folded |
| Rhode Island Stingrays | Providence, Rhode Island | | | ⚽️ | ⚽️ | ⚽️ | 15 | 1995 | 2009 | Folded |
| Rio Grande Valley FC Toros | Edinburg, Texas | | ⚽️ | ⚽️ | | | 8 | 2016 | 2023 | Folded |
| River Plate Puerto Rico | Fajardo, Puerto Rico | | | ⚽️ | | | 1 | 2010 | 2010 | Expelled |
| Riverside County Elite | Hemet, California | | | ⚽️ | | | 1 | 2000 | 2000 | Folded |
| Roanoke Wrath | Roanoke, Virginia | | | ⚽️ | | | 3 | 1998 | 2000 | Folded |
| Rochester Lancers | Rochester, New York | | | | | ⚽️ | 3 | 2012 | 2014 | Moved to MASL |
| Rochester Rhinos ‡ | Rochester, New York | | ⚽️ | | | | 22 | 1997 | 2017 | Moved to MLSNP |
| Sacramento Geckos | Sacramento, California | | ⚽️ | ⚽️ | | | 3 | 1997 | 1999 | Folded |
| Sacramento Scorpions | Sacramento, California | | ⚽️ | ⚽️ | | | 2 | 1996 | 1997 | Folded |
| Saint Louis FC | Fenton, Missouri | | ⚽️ | ⚽️ | | | 6 | 2015 | 2020 | Folded |
| San Antonio Pumas | San Antonio, Texas | | | ⚽️ | ⚽️ | ⚽️ | 10 | 1989 | 1998 | Folded |
| San Diego Gauchos | San Diego, California | | | ⚽️ | ⚽️ | | 5 | 2002 | 2006 | Folded |
| San Diego Loyal SC | San Diego, California | | ⚽️ | | | | 4 | 2020 | 2023 | Folded |
| San Diego Top Guns | San Diego, California | | | ⚽️ | ⚽️ | | 3 | 1994 | 1996 | Folded |
| San Francisco Bay Diablos | San Francisco, California | | | ⚽️ | ⚽️ | | 3 | 1993 | 1995 | Folded |
| San Francisco Seals | San Francisco, California | | ⚽️ | ⚽️ | ⚽️ | | 12 | 1992 | 2008 | Folded |
| San Jose Hawks | San Jose, California | | | | ⚽️ | | 1 | 1993 | 1993 | Folded |
| Santa Cruz Surf | Aptos, California | | | ⚽️ | ⚽️ | | 2 | 1993 | 1994 | Folded |
| Seattle BigFoot | Seattle, Washington | | | ⚽️ | ⚽️ | | 8 | 1995 | 2002 | Folded |
| Seattle Sounders FC ‡ | Seattle, Washington | | ⚽️ | | | | 12 | 1997 | 2008 | Moved to MLS |
| Sevilla FC Puerto Rico | Juncos, Puerto Rico | | | ⚽️ | | | 1 | 2010 | 2010 | Expelled |
| Sioux City Breeze | Sioux City, Iowa | | | ⚽️ | ⚽️ | | 6 | 1994 | 1999 | Folded |
| South Carolina Shamrocks | Greer, South Carolina | | ⚽️ | ⚽️ | | | 4 | 1996 | 1999 | Expelled |
| Southwest Florida Manatees | Cape Coral, Florida | | | ⚽️ | ⚽️ | | 2 | 1997 | 1998 | Folded |
| Spokane Zephyr FC | Spokane, Washington | ⚽️ | | | | | 2 | 2025 | 2026 | Folded |
| Sporting Kansas City II | Kansas City, Missouri | | ⚽️ | ⚽️ | | | 6 | 2016 | 2021 | Moved to MLSNP |
| St. Louis Knights | St. Louis, Missouri | | | ⚽️ | | | 2 | 1994 | 1995 | Folded |
| Staten Island Vipers | New York City, New York | | ⚽️ | | | | 2 | 1998 | 1999 | Folded |
| Syracuse Salty Dogs | Syracuse, New York | | ⚽️ | | | | 2 | 2003 | 2004 | Folded |
| Syracuse Silver Knights | Syracuse, New York | | | | | ⚽️ | 3 | 2012 | 2014 | Moved to MASL |
| Tacoma Defiance | Tacoma, Washington | | ⚽️ | ⚽️ | | | 4 | 2015 | 2021 | Moved to MLSNP |
| Tallahassee Tempest | Tallahassee, Florida | | | ⚽️ | | | 1 | 1998 | 1998 | Folded |
| Toronto FC II (Canada) | Toronto, Ontario | | ⚽️ | ⚽️ | | | 4 | 2015 | 2021 | Moved to MLSNP |
| Toronto Lynx (Canada) | Toronto, Ontario | | ⚽️ | | ⚽️ | | 18 | 1997 | 2014 | Merged |
| Tucson Amigos | Tucson, Arizona | | | ⚽️ | ⚽️ | ⚽️ | 9 | 1990 | 1999 | Folded |
| Tucson Fireballs | Tucson, Arizona | | | ⚽️ | | | 5 | 1997 | 2001 | Folded |
| Tulsa Renegades | Tulsa, Oklahoma | | | | ⚽️ | ⚽️ | 4 | 1989 | 1992 | Folded |
| Tulsa Roughnecks | Tulsa, Oklahoma | | | ⚽️ | ⚽️ | ⚽️ | 7 | 1993 | 1999 | Independence |
| Utah Blitzz | Salt Lake City, Utah | | | ⚽️ | | | 4 | 2000 | 2004 | Folded |
| Vancouver Whitecaps FC (Canada) † | Burnaby, British Columbia | | ⚽️ | | | | 13 | 1997 | 2009 | Moved to NASL |
| Vermont Voltage | St. Albans, Vermont | | | ⚽️ | ⚽️ | | 17 | 1997 | 2014 | Folded |
| Virginia Beach Mariners | Virginia Beach, Virginia | | ⚽️ | ⚽️ | | | 11 | 1994 | 2006 | Folded |
| VSI Tampa Bay FC | Plant City, Florida | | | ⚽️ | | | 1 | 2013 | 2013 | Folded |
| Waco Kickers | Waco, Texas | | | | ⚽️ | ⚽️ | 1 | 1990 | 1990 | Merged |
| Washington Mustangs | Washington, D.C. | | | ⚽️ | ⚽️ | ⚽️ | 3 | 1994 | 1996 | Folded |
| Whitecaps FC 2 (Canada) | Burnaby, British Columbia | | ⚽️ | ⚽️ | | | 3 | 2015 | 2017 | Folded |
| Wichita Blue Angels | Wichita, Kansas | | | ⚽️ | ⚽️ | | 4 | 1994 | 1999 | Folded |
| Wichita Tornado | Wichita, Kansas | | | | | ⚽️ | 1 | 1989 | 1989 | Folded |
| Wichita Wings | Park City, Kansas | | | | | ⚽️ | 2 | 2012 | 2013 | Folded |
| Willamette Valley Firebirds † | Corvallis, Oregon | | | ⚽️ | ⚽️ | | 7 | 1992 | 2000 | Folded |
| Wilmington Hammerheads FC | Wilmington, North Carolina | | | ⚽️ | ⚽️ | | 21 | 1996 | 2017 | Folded |
| Club | Location | D1 | D2 | D3 | Am | In | S | First | Last | Fate |
| Club | Location | Division(s) | | | | | S | First | Last | Fate |

== See also ==
- List of soccer clubs in the United States
- List of soccer clubs in Canada
- List of Canadian soccer clubs in American leagues
- List of professional sports teams in the United States and Canada
