= 1994 Fort Lauderdale Kicks season =

Fort Lauderdale Strikers
1994 season
- United States Interregional Soccer League (USISL): South East Division: Sixth place
- USISL Divisional playoffs: did not qualify
Home colors	Away colors

The 1994 Fort Lauderdale Kicks season was the first and only season and of the new team in the United States Interregional Soccer League. This year, the team finished in sixth place in the Southeast division. They did not make the playoffs. After the Fort Lauderdale Strikers club folded the team in the American Professional Soccer League in 1994, the Fort Lauderdale Kicks and the Strikers joined forces. The following year the name Fort Lauderdale Kicks were folded and a new Fort Lauderdale Strikers team was fielded in the USISL.

== Competitions ==
=== United States Interregional Soccer League (USISL) regular season ===
==== Schedule ====
Each team had a 20-game schedule, with two games counting as Designated Makeup Games (DMGs). DMGs are plugged in for any game that was cancelled during the season.

=== Scoring ===
Teams in the Northeast and Midwest have points that reflect the addition of a 1-point corner kick bonus per game. The standings published by the USISL list only the wins, losses, goals scored, goals allowed and total points. They do not provide the number of wins or losses that came through shootouts. They also do not provide the number of bonus points coming from goals or corner kicks.

- Regulation win = 6 points
- Shootout win (SW) = 4 points
- Shootout loss (SL) = 2 points
- Regulation loss = 0 points
- Bonus points (BP): An additional one-point per goal up to a maximum of three points per game.
- Northeast Division and Midwest Division teams received one point per corner kick each game.

=== Northeast Division ===
Place	Team	GP	W	L	GF	GA	GD	Points
1	Long Island Rough Riders	18	13	5	35	19	+16	117
2	Jersey Dragons	18	12	6	39	23	+16	110 (Note: Points deducted due to ineligible players.)
3	Cape Cod Crusaders	18	10	8	39	25	+14	98
4	New Jersey Imperials	18	10	8	28	25	+3	98
5	Delaware Wizards	18	9	9	28	25	+3	89
6	New York Fever	18	7	11	29	33	-4	82
7	Boston Storm	18	5	13	24	47	-23	65
8	Connecticut Wolves	18	6	12	14	32	-18	59
9	Philadelphia Freedom	18	6	12	21	36	-15	58

=== Atlantic Division ===
Place	Team	GP	W	L	GF	GA	GD	Points
1	Greensboro Dynamo	18	16	2	60	22	+38	143
2	Charleston Battery	18	14	4	36	15	+21	111'
3	Charlotte Eagles	18	10	8	44	32	+12	95
4	Raleigh Flyers	18	9	9	33	33	0	90
5	Hampton Roads Hurricanes	18	10	8	32	27	+5	84
6	Columbia Heat	18	9	9	32	39	-7	82
7	Washington Mustangs	18	11	7	33	29	+4	80 (Note: Points deducted due to ineligible players.)
8	Baltimore Bays	18	6	12	26	39	-13	59
9	Richmond Kickers	18	4	14	21	43	-22	44

==== Southeast Division ====
Place	Team	GP	W	L	GF	GA	GD	Points
1	Cocoa Expos	17	16	1	69	13	+56	128
2	Atlanta Magic	17	11	6	44	36	+8	104
3	Florida Stars	17	11	6	65	39	+26	97 (Note: Points deducted due to ineligible players.)
4	Orlando Lions	17	7	10	50	46	+4	81
5	Boca Raton Sabres	18	6	12	37	48	-11	73 (Note: Points deducted due to ineligible players.)
6	Fort Lauderdale Kicks	17	5	12	25	53	-28	53
7	South Florida Flamingos	17	3	14	19	80	-61	37

==== Midwest Division ====
Place	Team	GP	W	L	GF	GA	GD	Points
1	Minnesota Thunder	18	18	0	61	14	+47	170
2	Milwaukee Rampage	18	16	2	81	18	+63	161
3	Columbus Xoggz	18	11	7	39	37	+2	112
4	St. Louis Knights	18	11	7	46	37	+9	108
5	Detroit Wheels	18	9	9	35	38	-3	98
6	Rockford Raptors	18	10	8	36	34	+2	98
7	Des Moines Menace	18	5	13	37	46	-9	63
8	Cincinnati Cheetas	18	5	13	38	40	-2	59
9	Sioux City Breeze	18	1	17	15	64	-49	23

==== Midsouth Division ====
Place	Team	GP	W	L	GF	GA	GD	Points
1	Louisville Thoroughbreds	18	13	5	53	35	+18	114
2	New Orleans Riverboat Gamblers	18	12	6	38	23	+15	107
3	Birmingham Grasshoppers	18	13	5	36	19	+17	104
4	Lexington Bluegrass Bandits	18	10	8	32	25	+7	87
5	Nashville Metros	18	7	11	43	43	0	78
6	Arkansas A's	18	4	14	22	62	-40	45
7	Chattanooga Express	18	5	13	16	45	-29	36
8	Memphis Jackals	11	2	9	19	34	-15	29

==== South Central Division ====
Place	Team	GP	W	L	GF	GA	GD	Points
1	Tulsa Roughnecks	18	16	2	52	18	+44	132
2	DFW Toros	18	12	6	51	40	+11	112
3	San Antonio Pumas	18	11	7	53	30	+23	107
4	Texas Lightning	18	11	7	60	31	+29	103
5	Austin Lone Stars	17	10	7	62	51	+11	97
6	Dallas Rockets	18	9	9	39	48	-9	86
7	Oklahoma City Slickers	18	4	14	28	57	-29	46
8	Wichita Blue Angels	17	0	17	16	119	-103	16

==== Southwest Division ====
Place	Team	GP	W	L	GF	GA	GD	Points
1	East Los Angeles Cobras	18	16	2	70	32	+38	147
2	El Paso Patriots	18	13	5	57	28	+29	120 (Note: Points deducted due to ineligible players.)
3	Valley Golden Eagles	18	12	6	48	40	+8	110
4	Montclair Standard Falcons	18	10	8	40	34	+6	94
5	Arizona Cotton	18	7	11	49	33	+16	79
6	Tucson Amigos	18	7	11	44	43	+1	75
7	New Mexico Chiles	18	7	11	32	48	-16	66
8	Las Vegas Quicksilver	18	3	15	31	84	-53	48
9	San Diego Top Guns	9	4	5	16	19	+3	37

==== Pacific Division ====
Place	Team	GP	W	L	GF	GA	GD	Points
1	San Francisco United All-Blacks	18	15	3	59	20	+39	134
2	North Bay Breakers	18	14	4	55	29	+26	125
3	CCV Hydra	18	13	5	62	31	+31	122
4	Chico Rooks	18	12	6	43	30	+13	108
5	San Francisco Bay Diablos	18	10	8	42	48	-6	92 (Note: Points deducted due to ineligible players.)
6	Silicon Valley Firebirds	18	9	9	42	28	+14	85
7	Reno Rattlers	18	7	11	38	45	-7	71
8	Hawaii Tsunami	18	3	15	24	77	-53	40
9	Santa Cruz Surf	18	2	16	21	61	-40	32
10	Shasta Scorchers	18	2	16	20	63	-43	31
