= Chris Brown (footballer, born 1971) =

English-American footballer and coach (born 1971)

Personal information
- Full name: Christopher A. Brown
- Date of birth: August 16, 1971 (age 55)
- Place of birth: London, England
- Height: 6 ft 0 in (1.83 m)
- Position: Defender

College career
Years	Team	Apps	(Gls)
1990	Charlotte 49ers		
1991–1993	American Eagles		

Senior career*
Years	Team	Apps	(Gls)
1994–1995	TuS Celle	1	(0)
1995	Washington Mustangs		
1995–1996	Baltimore Bays (indoor)		
1996	Richmond Kickers	12	(0)
1996–1997	Tampa Bay Terror (indoor)		
1997–1999	New Orleans Storm	63	(1)
1998	→ Dallas Burn (loan)	1	(0)
1999	Maryland Mania	12	(0)
2000–2004	Richmond Kickers	64	(0)

Managerial career
- 1997: Tampa Spartans (assistant)
- 1998–1999: UMBC Retrievers (assistant)
- 2000–2006: VCU Rams (co-head coach)
- 2003–2004: Richmond Kickers (assistant)
- 2007–2023: South Florida Bulls (assistant)
- 2024–: South Florida Bulls
- 2010: Guyana
- * Club domestic league appearances and goals

Chris Brown is an English-American retired footballer who spent most of his career in the USL A-League. He is the head coach of the South Florida Bulls women's soccer team.

== Player ==
=== Youth ===
Born in England, Brown moved to the United States as a child and settled in San Antonio, Texas. In 1990, he began his collegiate career at the University of North Carolina at Charlotte. In 1991, he transferred to American University.

=== Professional ===
In 1994, Brown moved to Germany and signed with TuS Celle. In 1995, he returned to the United States where he finished the 1995 USISL outdoor season with the Washington Mustangs. He then signed with the Baltimore Bays for the 1995–1996 USISL indoor season. In 1996, he joined the Richmond Kickers for one season. In the fall of 1996, Brown moved indoors with the Tampa Bay Terror of the National Professional Soccer League. He signed with the New Orleans Riverboat Gamblers on April 4, 1997. In 1998, the Gamblers became the New Orleans Storm. That season, Brown went on loan to the Dallas Burn of Major League Soccer for one game. On February 24, 1999, he signed with the Maryland Mania. In 2000, Brown returned to the Kickers and remained with them until his retirement at the end of the 2004 season.

== Coach ==
In 1997, Brown began his coaching career as an assistant with the men's soccer team at the University of Tampa. In 1998, he moved to University of Maryland, Baltimore County, where he was an assistant with the women's team. In 2000, he became an assistant coach at Virginia Commonwealth University. In 2003 and 2004, Brown served as a player-assistant coach with the Richmond Kickers in addition to his collegiate coaching responsibilities. In 2007, he became an assistant at the University of South Florida. In 2008, he became co-head coach with his wife Denise Schilte. In 2010, he coached the Guyana women's national football team. In May 2021 Brown was announced as the head coach of Puerto Rico women's national football team in time to prepare for the 2023 FIFA Women's World Cup in Australia and New Zealand
