= Andrew Ziemer =

American soccer player

Personal information
- Date of birth: November 5, 1967 (age 58)
- Place of birth: San Francisco, California, United States
- Position: Midfielder

Youth career
- 1986–1987: Fresno State Bulldogs
- 1988: Santa Rosa Junior College
- 1990–1991: Sonoma State University

Senior career*
Years	Team	Apps	(Gls)
1989–1990	1. FC Recklinghausen		
1994–1995	North Bay Breakers		
1996–1997	California Jaguars		
- * Club domestic league appearances and goals

Andrew Ziemer is a retired American soccer player who played professionally in the USISL A-League.

== Youth ==
Growing up, Ziemer played for several amateur clubs. These include the Dixie Stompers (1983–85), Santa Rosa United (1986), Fresno Oro (1986–1987), Sons of Italy (1988) and Greek-American A.C. (1989–1994). Ziemer also played college soccer beginning with the Fresno State Bulldogs in 1986. In 1988, he transferred to Santa Rosa Junior College. In 1989, Ziemer left college to pursue a career in Europe. He signed with the amateur 1. FC Recklinghausen of the Regionalliga. In 1990, Ziemer returned to the United States to finish his collegiate career with two seasons of NCAA Division II soccer at Sonoma State University where he is second on the career goals list with 42 and third on the career assists list with 24. He was also a 1990 Division II NCAA All American. In 1991, Sonoma State finished runner-up in the NCAA Division II Men's Soccer Championship. In 2002, Sonoma State inducted Ziemer into its Athletic Hall of Fame.

== Professional ==
In 1994, Ziemer turned professional with the North Bay Breakers in the USISL. In 1995, he moved to the California Jaguars.
