= Mike Gosselin =

American soccer player

Personal information
- Full name: Michael Gosselin
- Place of birth: United States
- Height: 6 ft 1 in (1.85 m)
- Position: Defender

Youth career
- 1987–1990: University of South Carolina

Senior career*
Years	Team	Apps	(Gls)
1991–1992, 1993	Canton Invaders (indoor)	35	(17)
1993	Columbia Spirit		
1994–1995	Dayton Dynamo (indoor)	23	(4)
1994–1996	Greensboro Dynamo	52	(2)
1995	Cincinnati Silverbacks (indoor)	2	(0)
1995–1996	Buffalo Blizzard (indoor)	22	(4)
1998	Raleigh Flyers	8	(0)

International career
1992	United States	1	(0)
- * Club domestic league appearances and goals

Mike Gosselin is an American retired soccer defender who earned one cap with the U.S. national team in 1992. He played professionally in the National Professional Soccer League and USISL.

== Youth ==
Gosselin grew up in the Pacific Northwest. He was goalkeeper for Kentwood High School (Kent, Washington) as a freshman. He then attended Jefferson High School where he was the school's goalkeeper his sophomore year. Thomas Jefferson won the State Champion that year. He then transferred back to Kentwood High School his junior year where he was moved to forward and led the team in scoring as it finished fourth in the state tournament. After graduating from high school in 1987, he entered the University of South Carolina where he played on the men's soccer team from 1987 to 1990. This led to yet another position change, this time to defender. Was selected to the Soccer America all Freshman Team in 1987. NCAA Post Season Tournament 1987–1990. NCAA Final Four 1988.

== Professional ==
In 1991, the Canton Invaders of the National Professional Soccer League (NPSL) drafted Gosselin and he signed with the team on October 15, 1991. In March 1992, he strained his knee and lost several games, but was still selected to the All Rookie First Team. On September 13, 1992, the Buffalo Blizzard selected Gosselin with the first selection in the NPSL Expansion Draft. However, Canton purchased his contract from the Blizzard in October but he did not join the team as he was finishing his degree at South Carolina. In January 1992, multiple injuries to the Invaders back line led the team to sign Gosselin for two games. In February, Gosselin signed with the Columbia Spirit of the USISL in 1993. In 1994, he moved to the Greensboro Dynamo, winning the USISL championship that season. Gosselin was selected as the USISL Championship MVP and the All Star Team. He remained with the Dynamo through the 1996 season. In October 1994, he signed with the Dayton Dynamo for the 1994–1995 NPSL season. In the fall of 1995, he signed with the Cincinnati Silverbacks. He played two games then was traded to the Buffalo Blizzard in exchange for Matt Kmosko on November 9, 1995. In 1998, he played with the Raleigh Flyers.

== National team ==
Gosselin played on the US National U-21 Team 1989–1992 traveling to South Korea for the President Cup in 1989 & 1991 and France for the Toulon International Tournament representing the United States. In 1991, Gosselin played for the U.S. soccer team at the World University Games in Sheffield England. He earned his lone cap with the U.S. national team in a 2–0 win over Canada on September 3, 1992. He came on for John DeBrito in the 78th minute.
