= Greg Petersen =

American soccer player and coach

Personal information
- Place of birth: San Mateo, California, United States
- Position: Goalkeeper

Youth career
- Years: Team
- 1980–1984: CSU East Bay

Managerial career
- 1990–1993: Stanford Cardinal (assistant)
- 1994: CCV Hydra
- 1995: Monterey Bay Jaguars
- 1996: Reno Rattlers
- 1997–1998: Nashville Metros
- 2000: El Paso Patriots
- 2003: Des Moines Menace
- 2005: Ajax Orlando Prospects
- 2008–2009: Rocket City United

Greg Petersen is an American soccer coach.

== Player ==
Petersen attended CSU East Bay where he played as goalkeeper on the men's soccer team. In 1984, he was named to the First Team All Conference team.

== Coach ==
In 1990, Petersen became an assistant coach with the Stanford Cardinal soccer team.

In 1994, he was hired as head coach of the expansion CCV Hydra of the USISL.

He moved to the Monterey Bay Jaguars in 1995, before he joined the Reno Rattlers.

In 1997, the Nashville Metros of the USISL A-League hired Petersen.

In 1998, the Metros went to the quarterfinals of the U.S. Open Cup.

On November 3, 1999, the El Paso Patriots offered Petersen the head coaching position, which he took for a season.

In 2003, he was hired by the Des Moines Menace.

In 2004 Petersen joined Ajax Orlando as the director of youth development.

In February 2005, he became the head coach of the team.

In 2005 Petersen's Ajax Orlando Team became Champions of the Disney Showcase.

In May 2008, Rocket City United of the National Premier Soccer League hired Petersen.

He coached the 2008 and 2009 seasons, taking the Team to the NPSL Finals in 2009.

Currently Petersen is a Technical Consultant for Extra Time, Professional Football Consultants out of Barcelona, Spain
