= Jim Bokern =

American soccer player and coach

Personal information
- Date of birth: April 16, 1952 (age 74)
- Place of birth: St. Louis, Missouri, U.S.
- Position: Forward

College career
Years	Team	Apps	(Gls)
1970–1973	Saint Louis Billikens		

Senior career*
Years	Team	Apps	(Gls)
1974–1976	St. Louis Stars	48	(6)
- St. Louis Kutis

Managerial career
- Forest Park Archers
- St. Louis Kutis
- 1994–1995: St. Louis Knights
- * Club domestic league appearances and goals

Jim Bokern (born 16 April 1952) is an American former soccer player who played as a forward for three seasons in the North American Soccer League. Bokern went on to coach at the high school, collegiate and amateur levels. He won a high school state title, three NCAA Division I, a National Amateur Cup, a National Challenge Cup, and two USSF Over-30 Cup championship as a player as well as two high school state titles, one National Challenge Cup championship, two U.S. U-20 Cup titles and two U.S. O-30 Cup titles as a coach.

== Player ==
Bokern grew up in South St. Louis. He attended St. Mary's High School where he played on the 1970 Undefeated Missouri State championship soccer team. He was named the team's Offensive MVP. He then attended St. Louis University, playing on the men's soccer team from 1970 to 1973. During those years, the Billikens won the NCAA Division I national championship three times (1970, 1972 and 1973). He was inducted into the St. Louis University Hall of Fame in 1996. During his college years, he also played for St. Louis Kutis S.C. with whom he won the 1971 National Amateur Cup. In that game, he scored two goals as Kutis defeated Cleveland Inter-Italian 4–1. In 1974, the St. Louis Stars of the North American Soccer League drafted Bokern. He spent three seasons in the NASL. He then played at the semi-professional and amateur levels for over twenty years with Kutis. In 1985, Bokern and his teammates won the National Challenge Cup title.

== Coach ==
Bokern has coached at the high school, collegiate and professional levels. He was the 1977 Missouri High School Coach of the Year. That season, he had taken the Oakville High School soccer team to the State Championship. In 1983, he coached Forest Park Community College when it was runner up in the National Junior College national championship. He was also the 1983 NJCAA Coach of the Year. In 1985, he coached, as well as played on, Kutis F.C. when it won the National Challenge Cup. In 1994, Bokern was hired as head coach of the St. Louis Knights of the USISL. In 1996, he was named Missouri High School Coach of the Year for a second time, this time as head coach of his alma mater, St. Mary's High School, Bokern earned an USSF "A" Coaching License in 1996 and an USSF "Y" Coaching License in 2008.

In addition to coaching youth soccer, Bokern is the owner/broker of Bokern Realty in St. Louis.
