= Mark Abboud =

American soccer player (born 1970)

Personal information
- Date of birth: November 19, 1970 (age 55)
- Place of birth: Rochester, Minnesota, U.S.
- Position: Midfielder

College career
Years	Team	Apps	(Gls)
1988–1991	Macalester Scots		

Senior career*
Years	Team	Apps	(Gls)
1992	Tampa Bay Rowdies	4	(0)
1992–1993	Grenoble Foot 38		
1993	Tampa Bay Rowdies	1	(0)
1994	Lommel		
1994–2000	Minnesota Thunder		
1994–1995	Milwaukee Wave (indoor)	24	(0)
- * Club domestic league appearances and goals

Mark Abboud (born November 19, 1970) is an American former soccer midfielder who played two season in the American Professional Soccer League, one in the National Professional Soccer League, and seven in the USISL and USL A-League.

== Player ==
Born in Rochester, Minnesota, Abboud attended the local Mayo High School before entering Macalester College. He played for the Macalester Fighting Scots soccer team from 1988 to 1991, finishing his career as the school's all-time leading scorer. He graduated in 1992 with a bachelor's degree in mathematics and music. That spring, the Tampa Bay Rowdies of the American Professional Soccer League drafted Abboud and he spent the 1992 season in Florida. In the fall of 1992, he moved to France where he played for Grenoble Foot 38, at the time playing in the Championnat National. He returned to the Rowdies for the summer 1993 season, then moved to Dubai Club UAE League and Belgian First Division club K.F.C. Lommel S.K. In 1994, he returned to Minnesota and signed with the Minnesota Thunder which played in USISL. He would remain with the Thunder until retiring in 2000. In 1997, the Thunder moved to the USL A-League, at the time the highest level of outdoor soccer in the United States. Abboud also spent one season playing indoor soccer with the Milwaukee Wave. He spent the 1994–1995 season with the Wave in the National Professional Soccer League.

== Coach ==
In addition to playing for the Thunder, Abboud was the team's Director of Player Development from 1996 to 1999. Beginning in 2000, he entered the ranks of youth soccer with the Woodbury Soccer Club and then Bangu Tsunami FC where he is the Director of Coaching. In 2004, Abboud left Woodbury to start the Bangu Tsunami Academy, spearheading year-round development opportunities for interested players.

In 2008, Abboud led the merger of BTFC and the Wings SC to form the Minnesota Thunder Academy, under the umbrella of the state's professional organization. He was the club's Technical Director until 2010, eventually leaving the club to found his company, Skillzys, LLC.

Abboud coached HS soccer at East Ridge High School (Woodbury, MN) from 2009 until fall 2016, but is rumored to be making a living as a professional poker player.
