= Byron Mitchell (soccer) =

American soccer player

Personal information
- Date of birth: September 19, 1972 (age 54)
- Place of birth: Long Beach, California, U.S.
- Height: 5 ft 11 in (1.80 m)
- Position: Defender

Youth career
- –1991: Cape Henry Dolphins

College career
Years	Team	Apps	(Gls)
1991–1992, 1994–1995	Old Dominion Monarchs		

Senior career*
Years	Team	Apps	(Gls)
1994	Hampton Roads Hurricanes		
1995	Roanoke River Dawgs		
1996	Hampton Roads Mariners		
1997	Carolina Dynamo	20	(1)
1997–1998	St. Louis Ambush (indoor)	15	(1)
1998	Cincinnati Silverbacks (indoor)	22	(0)
1998–1999	Hampton Roads Mariners	47	(1)
1998–1999	Harrisburg Heat (indoor)	17	(2)
1999–2000	Buffalo Blizzard (indoor)	8	(0)
2001–2002	Cleveland Crunch (indoor)	13	(0)
2002–2003	Atlanta Silverbacks	44	(0)
- * Club domestic league appearances and goals

Byron Mitchell is an American retired soccer defender who played professionally in the USL A-League and National Professional Soccer League.

Mitchell graduated from Cape Henry Collegiate School, a secondary school in Virginia Beach, Virginia. He attended Old Dominion University, playing on the men's soccer team in 1991, 1992, 1994 and 1995. In addition to playing for Old Dominion, Mitchell spent the summer of 1994 with the Hampton Roads Hurricanes of the USISL and the summer of 1995 with the Roanoke River Dawgs of the USISL Premier League. In January 1995, the Canton Invaders selected Mitchell in the National Professional Soccer League Draft, but Mitchell did not sign with them. In 1996, Mitchell rejoined the Hurricanes, now known as the Hampton Roads Mariners playing in the USISL Select League. In 1997, Mitchell moved up to the Carolina Dynamo of the USISL A-League. That fall, he began his indoor career with the St. Louis Ambush of the National Professional Soccer League. On January 1, 1998, the Ambush traded Mitchell and Cash to the Cincinnati Silverbacks in exchange for Franklin McIntosh. On February 5, 1998, Mitchell signed with the Hampton Roads Mariners for the 1998 summer season. He would play both the 1998 and 1999 seasons with them. In the fall of 1998, Mitchell moved to his third indoor team, the Harrisburg Heat. On March 19, 1999, the Heat traded Mitchell and Jim Hesch to the Buffalo Blizzard for Bernie Lilavois. He continued to play for Buffalo in the 1999–2000 season. Mitchell did not play the 2000–2001 indoor season. In August 2001, the Cleveland Crunch selected Mitchell in the Major Indoor Soccer League dispersal draft. On March 21, 2002, Mitchell joined the Atlanta Silverbacks of the USL A-League.
