= Rodeo SC =

Soccer club based in Celina, Texas

- Founded: 2025; 1 year ago
- Ground: Bobcat Field; Celina, Texas
- Capacity: 7,000
- Owners: Jacob West (majority); Ben Watson
- League: USL League One
- Website: rodeosc.pro

The Rodeo Soccer Club, also known as Rodeo SC, is a professional men's soccer club based in Celina, Texas. Principally owned by Jacob West, the club intends to commence play in USL League One, a Division 3 league in the United States league system, in the 2028 season. The club will play its home games at Celina High School's Bobcat Field.

== History ==
=== Founding (2025−present) ===
Rodeo SC was founded by the founders of Texoma FC, in the aftermath of Texoma FC announcing they'd be self relegating to pre-professional league USL League Two. The club will take the spot of Texoma FC in USL League One, and announced they would begin play in the 2027 USL League One season. The crest of the club was revealed on March 27, 2026. On May 14, the club announced that it would push back its plan to begin play to the 2028 USL League One season.

On October 15th, 2026 Rodeo SC announced the hiring of former Southampton player Michael-John "MJ" Tate as their first sporting director.

== Club crest and colors ==
Rodeo SC unveiled their club crest on March 27, 2026. The crest features a bull rider and soccer ball in front of a background inspired by the Flag of Texas, along with the city and club name, all outlined by a rope. The entire crest is in the shape of a belt buckle, which is commonly awarded as a trophy in many Rodeo competitions. The club also debuted several secondary logos, including the bull rider and ball from the main crest, the club's initials "RSC" in the style of a cattle brand, and several wordmarks. All logos were designed by artist Casey Gaffney, a former resident of Celina. Danish sportswear brand Hummel were announced as their kit provider for the opening season.

== See also ==
- List of professional sports teams in Texas
- List of United Soccer League clubs
