= Marek Sadowski =

Polish footballer

Personal information
- Date of birth: 8 March 1959 (age 67)
- Place of birth: Sławatycze, Poland
- Height: 6 ft 0 in (1.83 m)
- Position: Defender

Senior career*
Years	Team	Apps	(Gls)
1984–1985	Radomiak Radom	26	(0)
1987–1988	Radomiak Radom		
1988–1990	Motor Lublin	48	(4)
1990	Porin Pallo-toverit	21	(3)
1990–1991	KS Lublinianka		
1991	Porin Pallo-toverit		
1991–1992	KS Lublinianka		
1992–1994	Siarka Tarnobrzeg	30	(4)
1994	North Jersey Imperials		
1994–1996	KS Lublinianka		
1996–1997	Polonia Przemyśl		

Managerial career
- KS Lublinianka
- Polonia Przemyśl
- Legion Tomaszowice
- 2003–2004: Granica Lubycza Królewska
- 2004–2005: Czarni Dęblin
- 2005–2008: Łada Biłgoraj
- 2009: Orlęta Radzyń Podlaski
- 2010: Iskra Piotrowice
- 2010–2013: KS Lublinianka
- 2013–2014: Orion Niedrzwica
- 2014–2016: KS Lublinianka
- 2016–2018: Tomasovia Tomaszów Lubelski
- 2019–2021: Unia Hrubieszów
- * Club domestic league appearances and goals

Marek Sadowski (born 8 March 1959) is a Polish football manager and former player who played professionally in Poland, Finland and the United States.

== Club ==
Sadowski spent most of his career in the lower Polish divisions. In 1990, he played for Porin Pallo-toverit in the Finnish Ykkönen as they gained promotion to the Veikkausliiga. Sadowski returned to Poland to play for KS Lublinianka during the winter, then rejoined Porin Pallo-toverit for the 1990 Veikkausliiga season. He then spent several seasons in Poland. In 1994, he played for the North Jersey Imperials in the American USISL.

== International ==
Sadowski played one game for the Polish B national team in 1985.
