= Luis Berbari =

American soccer player

Personal information
- Date of birth: October 5, 1972 (age 54)
- Place of birth: United States
- Height: 5 ft 11 in (1.80 m)
- Position: Midfielder

Youth career
- 1990–1993: Cal State Bakersfield Roadrunners

Senior career*
Years	Team	Apps	(Gls)
1994–1995	CCV Hydra		
1995–1996	Vorskla Poltava	23	(2)
1997	Nashville Metros	25	(5)
1998–1999	SV Darmstadt 98	28	(4)
- * Club domestic league appearances and goals

Luis Berbari (born October 5, 1972) is an American retired soccer player.

== Career ==
Berbari played four years of collegiate soccer at CSU Bakersfield before turning professional. Berbari began his professional career with Central California Valley Hydra of the USISL. He played in the 1994 and 1995 seasons for the Stockton, California-based professional team. During the off-season, Berbari trained with FC Zwolle (now PEC Zwolle) and SC Cambuur of the Dutch 2nd Division as well as with NK Zadar of the Croatian First Division.

At the age of 23, he became the first American Citizen to play in Ukraine when he signed with Ukrainian First League side FC Vorskla Poltava for the 1995–96 season, and helped the team gain promotion to the Ukrainian Premier League after finishing in first place. Following his spell in Ukraine, Berbari joined and captained the Nashville Metros for the 1997 A-League season. Berbari returned to Europe for the 1998–1999 season when he signed with German Oberliga club SV Darmstadt 98 helping them finish at the top of the table and gaining promotion to the Regionalliga.
