= Tim Foster (soccer) =

American soccer player

Personal information
- Full name: Timothy J. Foster
- Date of birth: July 3, 1969 (age 57)
- Place of birth: St. Paul Minnesota, U.S.
- Height: 6 ft 0 in (1.83 m)
- Positions: Defender; midfielder

Youth career
- 1987–1988, 1990–1991: San Diego State Aztecs

Senior career*
| Years | Team | Apps | (Gls) |
| 1991–1998 | Minnesota Thunder | | |
| 1999–2000 | Indiana Blast | 50 | (3) |
- * Club domestic league appearances and goals

Tim Foster is an American retired soccer player who played professionally in the USL A-League.

Foster graduated from Roseville Area High School in Roseville, Minnesota. He attended San Diego State University, playing on the men's soccer team from 1987 to 1988 and again from 1991 to 1992. He graduated with a bachelor's degree in international business. In 1991, Foster began to play for the Minnesota Thunder. At the time, the Thunder were an independent, amateur club. In 1994, the Thunder entered organized soccer when it joined the 1994 United States Interregional Soccer League. That year, the Thunder went to the league championship, falling to the Greensboro Dynamo in penalty kicks. Foster went on to play for the Thunder every season until 1998, although he lost the 1997 season with a knee injury. In 1998, the Thunder fell to the Rochester Rhinos in the 1998 A-League final. In 1999, Foster moved to the Indiana Blast. He retired in 2000. By that time, Foster was attended the University of Minnesota Law School where he graduated in 2002. He now practices law.
