= List of professional sports teams in Texas =

Texas is the second most populated state in the United States and has a rich history of professional sports.

== Active teams ==
=== Major league teams ===
Texas is home to 11 major professional sports teams. Four of the teams are located in Houston, two are in Arlington, two are in Dallas, one is in Austin, one is in Frisco and one is in San Antonio.

American football
League	Team	City	Stadium	Capacity
NFL	Dallas Cowboys	Arlington	AT&T Stadium	100,000
NFL	Houston Texans	Houston	NRG Stadium	72,220
Baseball
League	Team	City	Stadium	Capacity
MLB	Houston Astros	Houston	Daikin Park	41,168
MLB	Texas Rangers	Arlington	Globe Life Field	40,300
Basketball
League	Team	City	Arena	Capacity
NBA	Dallas Mavericks	Dallas	American Airlines Center	19,200
NBA	Houston Rockets	Houston	Toyota Center	18,104
NBA	San Antonio Spurs	San Antonio	Frost Bank Center	18,418
Ice Hockey
League	Team	City	Arena	Capacity
NHL	Dallas Stars	Dallas	American Airlines Center	18,532
Soccer
League	Team	City	Stadium	Capacity
MLS	Austin FC	Austin	Q2 Stadium	20,500
MLS	FC Dallas	Frisco	Toyota Stadium	22,500
MLS	Houston Dynamo FC	Houston	Shell Energy Stadium	20,656

=== Other professional sports teams ===
==== Men's leagues ====
American football
League	Team	City	Stadium	Capacity
UFL	Dallas Renegades	Frisco	Toyota Stadium	22,500
Arena football
League	Team	City	Arena	Capacity
AF1	Beaumont Renegades	Beaumont	Ford Arena	8,200
IFL	Austin IFL team	Austin	TBD	TBD
IFL	San Antonio Gunslingers	San Antonio	Freeman Coliseum	9,500
NAL	Amarillo Warbirds	Amarillo	Amarillo Civic Center	4,912
NAL	Dallas Apex	Mesquite	Gomez Western Wear Arena	7,000
Baseball
League	Team	City	Stadium	Capacity
PCL (AAA)	El Paso Chihuahuas	El Paso	Southwest University Park	7,500
PCL (AAA)	Round Rock Express	Round Rock	Dell Diamond	11,631
PCL (AAA)	Sugar Land Space Cowboys	Sugar Land	Constellation Field	7,500
TL (AA)	Amarillo Sod Poodles	Amarillo	Hodgetown	6,631
TL (AA)	Corpus Christi Hooks	Corpus Christi	Whataburger Field	7,679
TL (AA)	Frisco RoughRiders	Frisco	Riders Field	7,748
TL (AA)	Midland RockHounds	Midland	Momentum Bank Ballpark	4,709
TL (AA)	San Antonio Missions	San Antonio	Nelson W. Wolff Municipal Stadium	9,200
AAPB (Ind.)	Cleburne Railroaders	Cleburne	La Moderna Field	1,750
PEL (Ind.)	Alpine Cowboys	Alpine	Kokernot Field	1,400
PEL (Ind.)	Pecos Bills	Pecos	Cyclone Ballpark	1,000
Basketball
League	Team	City	Arena	Capacity
G League	Austin Spurs	Cedar Park	H-E-B Center at Cedar Park	8,700
G League	Rio Grande Valley Vipers	Edinburg	Bert Ogden Arena	7,688
G League	Texas Legends	Frisco	Comerica Center	4,500
TBL	ADS Sentinels	Converse	ADS Sports Complex	1,000
TBL	Creating Young Minds Leopards	Little Elm	Herschel Zellars Early Childhood Learning Center	500
TBL	Dallas Stampede	Dallas	Singing Hills Recreation Center	N/A
Cricket
League	Team	City	Stadium	Capacity
MLC	Texas Super Kings	Grand Prairie	Grand Prairie Stadium	7,200
Ice hockey
League	Team	City	Arena	Capacity
AHL	Texas Stars	Cedar Park	H-E-B Center at Cedar Park	6,778
ECHL	Allen Americans	Allen	Credit Union of Texas Event Center	6,275
Rodeo
League	Team	City	Arena	Capacity
PBR	Austin Gamblers	Austin	Moody Center	10,763
PBR	Texas Rattlers	Fort Worth	Cowtown Coliseum	2,400
PBR	Texas Rattlers	Fort Worth	Dickies Arena	9,300
Soccer
League	Team	City	Stadium	Capacity
MLSNP	Austin FC II	Austin	Parmer Field	1,000
MLSNP	Houston Dynamo 2	Houston	SaberCats Stadium	3,200
MLSNP	North Texas SC	Arlington	Choctaw Stadium	25,000
USLC	Atlético Dallas	Dallas	Cotton Bowl	92,100
USLC	El Paso Locomotive FC	El Paso	Southwest University Park	7,500
USLC	San Antonio FC	San Antonio	Toyota Field	8,296
USL1	Corpus Christi FC	Corpus Christi	Corpus Christi Sports Complex	5,000
USL1	Rodeo SC	Celina	Bobcat Stadium	6,500
Ultimate
League	Team	City	Stadium	Capacity
UFA	Austin Sol	Austin	Chaparral Stadium	10,361
UFA	Houston Havoc	Houston	SaberCats Stadium	3,200

=== Other professional sports teams ===
==== Women's Leagues ====
American football
League	Team	City	Arena	Capacity
X League	Dallas Sound	Dallas	TBD	TBD
Basketball
League	Team	City	Arena	Capacity
WNBA	Dallas Wings	Arlington	College Park Center	7,000
Soccer
League	Team	City	Stadium	Capacity
NWSL	Houston Dash	Houston	Shell Energy Stadium	20,656
USLS	Dallas Trinity FC	Dallas	Cotton Bowl	92,100
Softball
League	Team	City	Stadium	Capacity
AUSL	Texas Volts	Round Rock	Dell Diamond	11,631
Ultimate
League	Team	City	Stadium	Capacity
PUL	Austin Torch	Austin	Gamblin Field	2,000
Volleyball
League	Team	City	Arena	Capacity
LOVB	LOVB Austin	Cedar Park	H-E-B Center at Cedar Park	6,778
LOVB	LOVB Austin	San Antonio	Frost Bank Center	18,418
LOVB	LOVB Austin	San Marcos	Strahan Arena	10,000
LOVB	LOVB Houston	Cypress	Berry Center	8,300
LOVB	LOVB Houston	Rosenberg	Fort Bend Epicenter	8,600
MLV	Dallas Pulse	Frisco	Comerica Center	4,000

== See also ==
- Sports in Texas
