= Reno City FC =

American soccer club based in Nevada

- Full name: Reno City Football Club
- Founded: October 16, 2025; 11 months ago
- Ground: Reno Soccer Stadium
- Capacity: 6,000 (proposed)
- Owner(s): Todd Davis; Wendy Damonte; Bob Enzenberger; John Doyle
- League: USL Championship
- Website: renocityfc.com

Reno City FC, initially known as Reno Pro Soccer, is an upcoming American professional soccer team based in Reno, Nevada. Founded in 2025, the team's backers have suggested it would debut in the USL Championship in 2028.

== History ==
Reno previously fielded a team in the USL Championship, Reno 1868 FC based at Greater Nevada Field, from 2017 to 2020. In October 2025, the United Soccer League (USL) awarded an expansion team to the city of Reno, Nevada. The ownership group includes Todd Davis, Wendy Damonte, Bob Enzenberger and John Doyle.

Initially known as Reno Pro Soccer, it was announced in September 2026 that the new club would be called Reno City FC. The club's logo includes a orange-colored octagon with a black outline and the name of the club on the top and bottom of the badge with a cool-scripted R in the middle, also in black, with two horses rearing up, one of their hooves crossing into the badge.

== Proposed stadium ==
The club proposes to play on the grounds of a new 6000-seater stadium, expected to cost approximately $80m, which is planned for development on the former site of a car dealership.

The stadium is proposed be part of a larger sports and entertainment district. Demolition began on the former Jones West Ford site in April 2026, with completion of the new station project planned for March 2027. This was later pushed back to 2028, when the planned stadium is proposed to go up alongside an entertainment district.
