= List of Nashville SC seasons =

Nashville SC is an American professional soccer team based in Nashville, Tennessee. The club was founded in 2018 as a member of the United Soccer League (later the USL Championship), where they played in the second division of American soccer for two seasons. Nashville SC then joined Major League Soccer (MLS), the top flight league in the United States, as an expansion team in 2020. The club qualified for the playoffs in their first six seasons across both the USL and MLS; they missed the playoffs for the first time in 2024.

This is seasons list contains results of the two iterations of the franchise, with totals including statistics from both teams.

== Key ==
Key to competitions

- Major League Soccer (MLS) – The top-flight of soccer in the United States, established in 1996.
- USL Championship (USLC) – The second division of soccer in the United States, established in 2010 and previously known as USL and USL Pro. The Championship was the third division of American soccer from its founding until its elevation to second division status in 2017.
- U.S. Open Cup (USOC) – The premier knockout cup competition in U.S. soccer, first contested in 1914.
- CONCACAF Champions League (CCL) – The premier competition in North American soccer since 1962. It went by the name of Champions' Cup until 2008.

Key to colors and symbols

1st or W	Winners
2nd or RU	Runners-up
3rd	Third place
Last	Last place
♦	League top scorer
	Highest average attendance
Italics	Ongoing competition

Key to league record

- Season = The year and article of the season
- Div = Division/level on pyramid
- League = League name
- Con = Conference name
- Pld = Games played
- W = Games won
- L = Games lost
- D = Games drawn
- GF = Goals for
- GA = Goals against
- GD = Goal difference
- Pts = Points
- PPG = Points per game
- Conf. = Conference position
- Overall = League position

Key to cup record

- DNE = Did not enter
- DNQ = Did not qualify
- NH = Competition not held or canceled
- QR = Qualifying round
- PR = Preliminary round
- GS = Group stage
- R1 = First round
- R2 = Second round
- R3 = Third round
- R4 = Fourth round
- R5 = Fifth round
- Ro16 = Round of 16
- QF = Quarterfinals
- SF = Semifinals
- F = Final
- RU = Runners-up
- W = Winners

== Seasons ==
Season	League												Position		Playoffs	USOC	Continental / Other		Average attendance (Note: Average attendance only includes statistics from regular season matches.)	Top goalscorer(s) (Note: Top goalscorer(s) includes all goals scored in the regular season, playoffs, U.S. Open Cup, MLS is Back Tournament, Leagues Cup, CONCACAF Champions League, FIFA Club World Cup, and other competitive continental matches.)		Ref.
Season	Div	League	Con	Pld	W	L	D	GF	GA	GD	Pts	PPG	Conf.	Overall	Playoffs	USOC	Continental / Other		Average attendance	Player(s)	Goals	Ref.
2018	2	USL	E	34	12	13	9	42	31	+11	49	1.44	8th	17th	R1	Ro16	DNQ		9,561	(United States) Brandon Allen	9	
2019	2	USLC	E	34	20	7	7	59	26	+33	67	1.97	2nd	3rd	QF	R3	DNQ		6,999	(Mexico) Daniel Ríos	21	
2020	1	MLS	E (Note: In 2020, Nashville SC switched from the Western Conference to the Eastern Conference after playing 2 matches.)	23	8	7	8	24	22	+2	32	1.39	7th	14th	QF	NH	MLS is Back Tournament	DNE	12,925	(Germany) Hany Mukhtar	5	
2021	1	MLS	E	34	12	4	18	55	33	+22	54	1.59	3rd	7th	QF	NH	DNQ		19,338	(Germany) Hany Mukhtar	19	
2022	1	MLS	W	34	13	10	11	52	41	+11	50	1.47	5th	10th	R1	QF	DNQ		27,554	(Germany) Hany Mukhtar	26 ♦	
2023	1	MLS	E	34	13	11	10	39	32	+7	49	1.44	7th	12th	R1	R16	Leagues Cup	RU	28,257	(Germany) Hany Mukhtar	17	
2024	1	MLS	E	34	9	16	9	38	54	–16	36	1.06	13th	25th	DNQ	DNE	CONCACAF Champions Cup Leagues Cup	R16 GS	28,599	(England) Sam Surridge	12	
2025	1	MLS	E	34	16	12	6	58	45	13	54	1.59	6th	11th	R1	W	DNQ		26,638	(England) Sam Surridge	24	
Total				261	103	80	78	367	284	+83	391	1.5	—	—	—	—	—		—	(Germany) Hany Mukhtar	66	—
