= List of Ottawa Fury FC seasons =

The Ottawa Fury FC were a soccer club based in Ottawa, Ontario, Canada. They first fielded a professional team in 2014 after nine seasons of play in the semi-professional Premier Development League as the Ottawa Fury SC. They competed in the second division of the United States soccer league system, starting in the North American Soccer League, before eventually transferring to the United Soccer League for the 2017 season. The following list is inclusive of all competitive yearly records for both the semi-pro and professional iterations of the club.

== Key ==
Key to competitions

- North American Soccer League (NASL) – The second division of soccer in the United States from 2011 through 2017, now defunct.
- USL Championship (USL or USLC) – The second division of soccer in the United States, established in 2010 and previously known as USL and USL Pro. The Championship was the third division of American soccer from its founding until its elevation to second division status in 2017.
- Canadian Championship (CC) – The premier knockout cup competition in Canadian soccer, first contested in 2008.

Key to colors and symbols

1st or W	Winners
1st	Minor title
2nd or RU	Runners-up
SF	Semi-finalists
Last	Wooden Spoon
♦	Golden Boot
	Highest average attendance

Key to league record

- Season = The year and article of the season
- Div = Level on pyramid
- League = League name
- Pld = Played
- W = Games won
- L = Games lost
- D = Games drawn
- GF = Goals scored
- GA = Goals against
- Pts = Points
- PPG = Points per game
- Conf = Conference position
- Overall = League position

Key to cup record

- DNE = Did not enter
- DNQ = Did not qualify
- NH = Competition not held or canceled
- QR = Qualifying round
- PR = Preliminary round
- GS = Group stage
- R1 = First round
- R2 = Second round
- R3 = Third round
- R4 = Fourth round
- R5 = Fifth round
- QF = Quarterfinals
- SF = Semifinals
- RU = Runners-up
- W = Winners

== Seasons ==
Season	League											Position			Playoffs	CC	Continental / Other	Average attendance	Top goalscorer(s)		Ref
Season	Div	League	Pld	W	D	L	GF	GA	GD	Pts	PPG	Conf. (Note: Indicates division finish for PDL seasons, spring/fall finish for NASL seasons, conference finish for USL seasons.)		Overall	Playoffs	CC	Continental / Other	Average attendance	Name(s)	Goals	Ref
2005	– (Note: Leagues below the third tier are designated as amateur and not officially ranked by the CSA.)	PDL	16	9	0	7	42	29	+13	27	1.69	3rd		–	DNQ	NH	ineligible	322	No data		
2006	–	PDL	16	7	3	6	25	24	+1	24	1.50	2nd		–	DNQ	NH	ineligible	259	No data		
2007	–	PDL	16	3	5	8	17	21	–4	14	0.88	7th		–	DNQ	NH	ineligible	260	No data		
2008	–	PDL	16	9	3	4	38	22	+16	30	1.88	2nd		–	DNQ	DNE	ineligible	330	No data		
2009	–	PDL	16	12	4	0	48	8	+40	40	2.50	1st		–	R2	DNE	ineligible	383	No data		
2010	–	PDL	16	11	3	2	33	10	+23	36	2.25	1st		–	QF	DNE	ineligible	379	No data		
2011	–	PDL	16	4	5	7	22	31	–9	17	1.06	4th		–	DNQ	DNE	ineligible	220	No data		
2012	–	PDL	16	10	3	3	30	14	+16	33	2.06	1st		–	QF	DNE	ineligible	188	No data		
2013	–	PDL	16	11	2	1	40	7	+33	35	2.92	1st		–	QF	DNE	ineligible	256	No data		
2014	2	NASL	27	7	6	14	34	38	–4	27	1.00	6th	9th	8th	DNQ	R1	did not qualify	4,492	(Brazil) Oliver	7	
2015	2	NASL	30	15	11	4	42	23	+19	56	1.87	9th	1st	2nd	RU	R1	ineligible	5,164	(United States) Tom Heinemann	12	
2016	2	NASL	32	7	10	15	32	40	–8	31	0.97	9th	12th	10th	DNQ	SF	did not qualify	5,482	(Canada) Carl Haworth	8	
2017	2	USL	32	8	14	10	42	41	+1	38	1.19	10th		20th	DNQ	SF	not held	5,365	(Cape Verde) Steevan Dos Santos	12	
2018	2	USL	34	13	6	15	31	43	–12	45	1.32	10th		19th	DNQ	SF	did not qualify	4,752	(Panama) Tony Taylor	5	
2019	2	USLC	34	14	10	10	50	43	+7	52	1.53	8th		13th	R1	SF	did not qualify	4,555	(Germany) Wal Fall (Canada) Carl Haworth	10	
Total	–	–	333	140	85	108	526	363	+163	505	1.52	–			–	–	–	2,160	(Canada) Carl Haworth	28	–

== Post-season record ==
Scores and results list Ottawa's goal tally first
Season	Round	Opponent	Score
2009	Division Finals	Ocean City Barons	1–2 (H)
2010	Conference Semifinals	Newark Ironbound Express	2–0 (H)
2010	Conference Finals	Reading United	2–3 (H)
2012	Divisional round	GPS Portland Phoenix	3–2 (H)
2012	Conference Semifinals	Ocean City Nor'easters	1–0 (A)
2012	Conference Finals	Carolina Dynamo	0–1 (A)
2013	Divisional round	GPS Portland Phoenix	6–0 (H)
2013	Conference Semifinals	Reading United	3–2 (A)
2013	Conference Finals	Ocean City Nor'easters	1–3 (A)
2015	Semifinals	Minnesota United FC	2–1 (H)
2015	Final	New York Cosmos	2–3 (A)
2019	Play-in round	Charleston Battery	1–1 (H)

== See also ==
- List of Ottawa Fury Women seasons
