= Richard Sharpe (soccer) =

English footballer

Personal information
- Date of birth: 15 January 1969 (age 57)
- Place of birth: Berkshire, England
- Position: Forward

Youth career
- West Ham United
- Leyton Orient

College career
Years	Team	Apps	(Gls)
1990–1993	Florida Tech Panthers		

Senior career*
Years	Team	Apps	(Gls)
1994–1995	Cocoa Expos	21	(47)
1996	Colorado Rapids	17	(2)
1997	Carolina Dynamo	14	(6)
- * Club domestic league appearances and goals

Richard Sharpe (born 15 January 1967, in London, England) is an English retired soccer forward whose career in the United States included one season with Colorado Rapids of Major League Soccer.

Sharpe grew up in England, playing in the West Ham United and Leyton Orient youth systems. He moved to the United States in 1989 where he entered Florida Institute of Technology. Over four seasons, he established himself as the most successful forwards in NCAA Division II history. He holds the NCAA record for season points (112), career points (321), season goals (49) and career goals (137). He was a 1991, 1992 and 1993 first team All American. In 1991, Sharpe and his teammates also won the Division II national championship.

In 1994, Sharpe signed with the Cocoa Expos in the USISL. He promptly scored 33 goals in 15 games, leading the league. He also scored a hat trick at that year's All Star game. In 1995, he played only six games, but still scored 14 goals. He then trained with Rochdale A.F.C In March 1996, the Colorado Rapids selected Sharpe in the second round (nineteenth overall) of the 1996 MLS Supplemental Draft. He played seventeen games with the Rapids in 1996, scoring only two goals. On 20 January 1997, the Rapids released Sharpe. In February 1997, he signed a two-year contract with the Carolina Dynamo of the USISL A-League. He injured his knee in the Dynamo's first game of the season. He returned in June, but injured his back at the beginning of the playoffs.
