= Santa Cruz Surf =

Defunct soccer team in the United States

- Founded: 1994; 32 years ago
- Dissolved: 1994
- Stadium: Carl Connelly Stadium; Aptos, California
- League: United States Interregional Soccer League

The Santa Cruz Surf was an American soccer team based in Santa Cruz, California that played in the USISL. They played their home games at Carl Connelly Stadium on the campus of Cabrillo College and Watsonville High School's stadium.

== History ==
The Santa Cruz Surf was announced in January 1993 as members of the USISL Pacific Coast Division, with Kevin Milliken as the team owner. The team's head coach, Mark Tomlin, resigned with two games left in its inaugural season, causing Milliken to step in as interim coach.

Former Watsonville High and Cabrillo College coach Art Romswinckel-Guise was appointed head coach ahead of the 1994 USISL season, replacing Tomlin. The team would split home games in their second season between Cabrillo College's Carl Connelly Stadium and Watsonville High School's Geiser Field, due to a scheduling conflict with the former institution early into the USISL season. Santa Cruz and Cabrillo College hosted the Russian National team ahead of the 1994 FIFA World Cup, forcing the Surf to play in Watsonville. On June 13, 1994, the Surf hosted the Russia national football team in an exhibition. Jeremy Perez scored the lone goal for the home side in an 8–1 loss with an estimated 2,500 people in attendance, which was believed the be the largest soccer crowd in Santa Cruz County history at the time.

In April 1995, Surf owner Milliken announced that the team would fold due to an inability come to an agreement with Cabrillo College to host the team for another season. Santa Cruz would continue to have a USISL presence as the newly formed Monterey Bay Jaguars scheduled eight matches at Cabrillo College, in addition to matches at their other home of Alisal High School stadium in Salinas. Miliken had sold his Monterey County USISL rights in 1994 to the ownership group that formed the Jaguars.

== Year-by-year record ==
| Year | Division | League | Reg. season | Playoffs | Open Cup |
|---|---|---|---|---|---|
| 1993 | N/A | USISL | 6th, Pacific | Did not qualify | Did not enter |
| 1994 | 3 | USISL | 9th, Pacific | Did not qualify | Did not qualify |
