= San Francisco Bay Diablos =

San Francisco Bay Diablos were an American soccer team that played in San Francisco, California as a member of the USISL from 1993 to 1995.

== History ==
Owner Mario Chavez coached the team during its inaugural season in 1993. In 1994, he brought in former Nigerian international Tony Igwe to coach. Igwe lasted only four games with the team losing all four games. Chavez, then struck a deal with Salvador Lopez to bring in the 1993 Lamar Hunt US Open Cup Champions C.D. Mexico (aka, El Farolito Soccer Club) to take over the club and run the team. The team enjoyed immediate success and if not for an 18-point deduction in points for a rules violation, the club would have made their first and only playoff appearance. In 1995, Lopez withdrew his support and the cooperation between the two clubs ceased. The Diablos folded after three seasons in the league.

== Year-by-year ==
Year	Division	League	Reg. season	Playoffs	Open Cup
1993	3	USISL	7th, Pacific	Did not qualify	Did not enter
1994	3	USISL	5th, Pacific	Did not qualify	Did not enter
1995	3	USISL Pro League	5th, Western North	Did not qualify	Did not qualify
