= Philadelphia Freedom (soccer) =

USISL soccer club

The Philadelphia Freedom was a soccer club that competed in the USISL and the USISL Pro League. The team was known as the Pennsylvania Freedom through the 1995/96 indoor season before changing its name prior to the 1996 outdoor season. The team folded at the end of the 1997 season.

== Year-by-year ==
Year	Division	League	Reg. season	Playoffs	Open Cup
1994	3	USISL	9th, Northeast	Did not qualify	Did not enter
1995	3	USISL Pro League	3rd, Capital	1st Round	Did not qualify
1995/96	N/A	USISL Indoor	2nd, Northeast	Did not qualify	N/A
1996	3	USISL Pro League	5th, Northeast	Did not qualify	Did not qualify
1996/97	N/A	I-League	3rd, East	Did not qualify	N/A
1997	3	USISL D-3 Pro League	2nd, Mid-Atlantic	Division Semifinals	2nd Round
