= St. Louis Knights =

The St. Louis Knights were an American soccer team based in St. Louis, Missouri. The team began in the USISL and moved to the USISL Pro League in 1995.

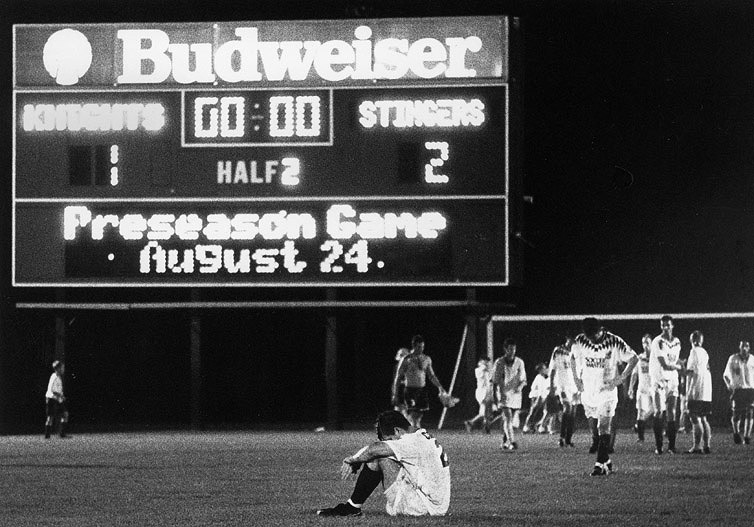
The Knights final match was a 2–1 loss to Chicago in the 1995 playoffs.

The team was coached both seasons by Jim Bokern.

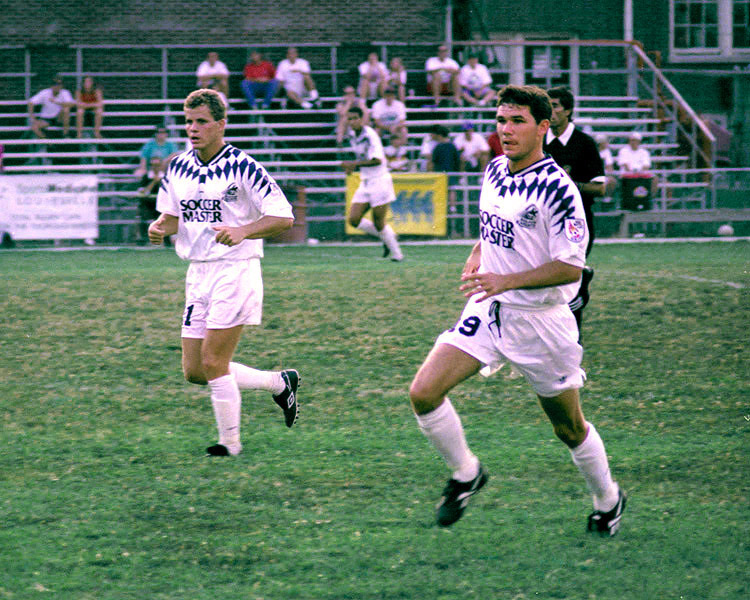
Scott McDonial (right) chases after a ball.

== Year-by-year ==
Year	Division	League	Reg. season	Playoffs	Open Cup
1994	3	USISL	4th, Midwest	Divisional Semifinals	Did not enter
1995	3	USISL Pro League	3rd, Midwest East	1st Round	Did not qualify

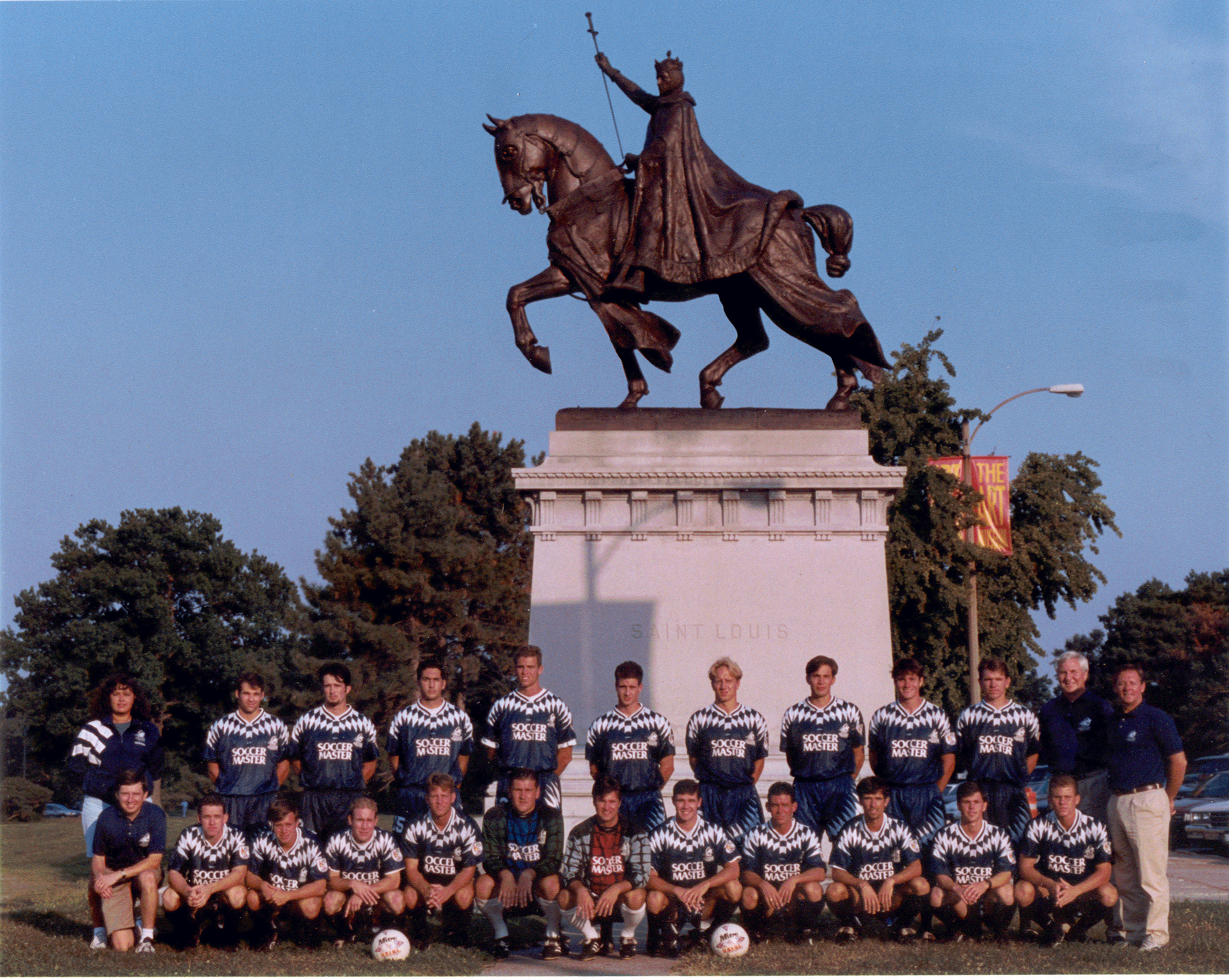
St. Louis Knights
