= Reno Rattlers =

Former American soccer team

The Reno Rattlers were an American soccer team based in Reno, Nevada from 1994 to 1998. The club began in the USISL and moved to the USL Second Division in 1995. The team moved up to the USISL Select League in 1996, but returned to the Pro League the next season. The Rattlers disbanded following the 1998 season.

The Rattlers played most home contests at Earl Wooster High School in Reno.

== Year-by-year ==
| Year | Division | League | Reg. season | Playoffs | Open Cup |
|---|---|---|---|---|---|
| 1994 | 3 | USISL | 7th, Pacific | Did not qualify | Did not enter |
| 1995 | 3 | USISL Pro League | 3rd, Western North | Divisional Semifinals | Did not qualify |
| 1996 | 3 | USISL Select League | 5th, Pacific | Did not qualify | Did not qualify |
| 1997 | 3 | USISL D-3 Pro League | 8th, West | Did not qualify | Did not qualify |
| 1998 | 3 | USISL D-3 Pro League | 6th, West | Did not qualify | Did not qualify |

== Coaches ==
- Aldo Petrolino: 1994–1995
- Greg Petersen: 1996
