= Central California Valley Hydra =

Central California Valley Hydra was an American soccer team that played in Stockton, California. The team joined the USISL in 1994 and moved to the USISL Pro League in 1995. They folded after the 1996 season.

== Year-by-year ==
Year	Division	League	Reg. season	Playoffs	Open Cup
1994	3	USISL	3rd, Pacific	Divisional Semifinals	Did not enter
1995	3	USISL Pro League	4th, Western North	Did not qualify	Did not qualify
1996	3	USISL Pro League	7th, Western	Did not qualify	Did not qualify

== Coaches ==
- Greg Petersen: 1994
