= North Bay Breakers =

The North Bay Breakers were an American soccer team based in Santa Rosa, California.

They joined the USISL in 1994 and moved to the USISL Premier League in 1995.

Eric Hofman served as head coach in 1994.

== Year-by-year ==
Year	Division	League	Reg. season	Playoffs	Open Cup
1994	3	USISL	2nd, Pacific	Divisional Finals	Did not enter
1995	"4"	USISL Premier League	4th, Western	Divisional 3rd/4th	Did not qualify
