= Cincinnati Cheetahs =

American soccer team

The Cincinnati Cheetahs were an American soccer team that played in Cincinnati, Ohio.

During their 1994 season, the Cheetahs' home field was at St. Xavier High School in Springfield Township, Hamilton County.

== Year-by-year ==
Year	Division	League	Reg. season	Playoffs	Open Cup
1994	3	USISL	8th, Midwest	Did not qualify	Did not enter
1995	3	USISL Pro League	4th, Midwest East	Did not qualify	Did not qualify
