= Washington Mustangs =

Defunct soccer team based in Washington, D.C

The Washington Mustangs were an American soccer team that played in Washington, DC in the now-defunct United States Interregional Soccer League.

== Year-by-year ==
| Year | Division | League | Reg. season | Playoffs | Open Cup |
|---|---|---|---|---|---|
| 1994 | 3 | USISL | 7th, Atlantic | Divisional Semifinals | Did not enter |
| 1995 | "4" | USISL Premier League | 6th, Eastern | Did not qualify | Did not qualify |
| 1995/96 | "4" | USISL Indoor | 6th, Northeast | Did not qualify | N/A |
| 1996 | 3 | USISL Pro League | 4th, South Atlantic | Conference Semifinals | Did not qualify |
