= Columbia Heat =

American soccer club

- Full name: Columbia Heat
- Founded: 1993
- Dissolved: 1995
- Ground: Eugene E. Stone III Stadium
- Capacity: 5,700
- League: USISL

Columbia Heat was a soccer club which spent three seasons in the USISL.

== History ==
In 1993, the Columbia Spirit entered the USISL. Following the 1993 season, the team was renamed the Columbia Heat. In 1995, the USISL split into two leagues, the Professional and Premier (Amateur) Leagues. Columbia spent the season in the Premier League before withdrawing and folding at the end of the season. The team played in Columbia, South Carolina; at the University of South Carolina, on Eugene E. Stone III Stadium.

== Year-by-year ==
Year	Division	League	Regular season	Playoffs	Open Cup
1993	N/A	USISL Outdoor	9th Atlantic	Did not qualify	N/A
1994	N/A	USISL Outdoor	6th Atlantic	Sizzling Nine	N/A
1995	N/A	USISL Amateur	9th Eastern	Did not qualify	N/A
