= United States Interregional Soccer League =

Men's soccer league in the United States, 1989–1994

- Promotional poster for the 1994 season
- Organising body: USISL
- First season: 1989
- Folded: 1994
- Replaced by: USISL Pro League; USISL Premier League
- Country: United States
- Confederation: CONCACAF
- Number of clubs: 69 (1994)
- Level on pyramid: Division 3 (1994)
- Most championships: Colorado Comets (2); Greensboro Dynamo (2)

The United States Interregional Soccer League (USISL) was a semi-professional men's outdoor soccer league that played six seasons from 1989 to 1994. It was the first outdoor league to be operated by the organization known today as the United Soccer League. Commencing play in 1989, it received Division 3 status from U.S. Soccer for its final season in 1994. It was split into the USISL Professional League and the amateur USISL Premier League in 1995. The Colorado Comets and Greensboro Dynamo were the most successful clubs in the league, winning two championships each.

== History ==
Ahead of the 1994 FIFA World Cup held in the United States, U.S. Soccer began work with various leagues, including the Southwest Indoor Soccer League (SISL), to professionalize soccer in the country. The SISL embarked on their ambitions to run a three-tiered outdoor soccer league, and launched the Southwest Outdoor Soccer League in the 1988–89 season as part of the first step towards that goal. The organization, and its two leagues, would be rebranded as the Southwest Independent Soccer League in the 1989–90 season, the Sunbelt Independent Soccer League in the 1990–91 season, and finally the United States Interregional Soccer League in the 1991–92 season.

In its 1993–94 season, the league was granted Division 3 status by U.S. Soccer. Following significant expansion over the preceding years to 69 teams by 1994, the USISL decided to split the league for the 1995 season into a Division 3 league populated with its professional clubs, the USISL Professional League, and a league outside of U.S. Soccer's canonical pyramid populated with its amateur clubs, the USISL Premier League. The USISL, now the United Soccer League, recognizes the Premier League as the successor to the original outdoor league in its statistical records.

== Teams ==
- Arizona Cotton (1990–1994)
- Arkansas Diamonds (1990–1992; 1994)
- Atlanta Express (1991–1992)
- Atlanta Magic (1992–1994)
- Atlanta Quicksilver (1991)
- **Austin Lone Stars**
- Baltimore Bays (1993–1994)
- Birmingham Grasshoppers (1994)
- Boca Raton Sabres (1992–1994)
- Boston Storm (1994)
- Cape Cod Crusaders (1994)
- Central California Valley Hydra (1994)
- Charleston Battery (1993–1994)
- Charlotte Eagles (1993–1994)
- Chattanooga Express (1992–1994)
- Chico Rooks (1993–1994)
- Cincinnati Cheetahs (1994)
- Cocoa Expos (1994)
- Colorado Comets (1989–1991)
- Columbia Heat (1993–1994)
- Columbus Xoggz (1994)
- Connecticut Wolves (1993–1994)
- Coral Springs Kicks (1993)
- Dallas Rockets (1990–1994)
- Delaware Wizards (1993–1994)
- Des Moines Menace (1994)
- Detroit Wheels (1994)
- **DFW Toros**
- East Bay Red Riders (1992–1993)
- East Los Angeles Cobras (1993–1994)
- El Paso Patriots (1991–1994)
- Florida Stars (1994)
- Fort Lauderdale Kicks (1994)
- Greensboro Dynamo (1993–1994)
- Hampton Roads Hurricanes (1994)
- Hawaii Tsunami (1994)
- Jersey Dragons (1994)
- Las Vegas Quicksilver (1994)
- Lexington Bluegrass Bandits (1994)
- Long Island Rough Riders (1994)
- Louisville Thoroughbreds (1994)
- Lubbock Lazers (1989–1992)
- Memphis Jackals (1991–1994)
- Milwaukee Rampage (1994)
- Minnesota Thunder (1994)
- Montclair Standard Falcons (1993–1994)
- Nashville Metros (1991–1994)
- **New Mexico Chiles**
- New Orleans Riverboat Gamblers (1994)
- New York Fever (1994)
- North Jersey Imperials (1994)
- North Bay Breakers (1992–1994)
- Oklahoma City Slickers (1993–1994)
- Oklahoma City Warriors (1989–1992)
- Orlando Lions (1992–1994)
- Palo Alto Firebirds (1992–1994)
- Permian Basin Shooting Stars (1990–1992)
- Philadelphia Freedom (1994)
- Raleigh Flyers (1993–1994)
- Reno Rattlers (1994)
- Richmond Kickers (1993–1994)
- Rockford Raptors (1994)
- **San Antonio Pumas**
- San Diego Top Guns (1994)
- San Fernando Valley Golden Eagles (1993–1994)
- San Francisco All Blacks (1992–1994)
- San Francisco Bay Diablos (1993–1994)
- San Jose Hawks (1993)
- Santa Cruz Surf (1993–1994)
- Shasta Scorchers (1994)
- Sioux City Breeze (1994)
- South Florida Flamingos (1994)
- St. Louis Knights (1994)
- Texas Lightning (1993–1994)
- Tulsa Renegades (1989–1991)
- Tulsa Roughnecks (1993–1994)
- Tucson Amigos (1990–1994)
- Waco Kickers (1990)
- Washington Mustangs (1994)
- Wichita Blue Angels (1994)

== Seasons ==
List of SOSL / SISL / USISL seasons
| Yr. | T | MP | Champion | Runners-up | Top goalscorer | Ref. |
|---|---|---|---|---|---|---|
| 1989 | 8 | 12 | Colorado Comets | Addison Arrows | (United States) Don Gallegos (13) | |
| 1990 | 14 | 14 | Colorado Comets | Richardson Rockets | (United States) Marcelo Draguicevich (12) (United States) Derek Sholeen (12) (United States) Chris Veselka (12) | |
| 1991 | 17 | 16 | Richardson Rockets | New Mexico Chiles | (Socialist Federal Republic of Yugoslavia) Vladi Stanojevic (15) | |
| 1992 | 21 | 14 | Palo Alto Firebirds | Tucson Amigos | (United States) Efren Rodarte (14) | |
| 1993 | 38 | 16 | Greensboro Dynamo | Orlando Lions | (England) Sheldon Lee (19) | |
| 1994 | 69 | 18 | Greensboro Dynamo | Minnesota Thunder | (England) Richard Sharpe (33) | |

== See also ==
- American Soccer League (1988–1989)
- American Professional Soccer League (1990–1996)
- Lone Star Soccer Alliance (1987–1992)
- Western Soccer Alliance (1985–1989)
