= 2024 Redlands FC season =

Redlands FC
2024 season
- Chairman: Ryan Whiley
- Manager: Cody Carlson
- Stadium: Dodge Stadium; Redlands, California
- USL League Two: Division: 4th
- Biggest win: RDL 9–1 Southern California Eagles
- Biggest defeat: RDL 1–5 FC Tucson

The 2024 Redlands FC season is the club's 2nd season in USL League Two, the fourth tier of the American Soccer Pyramid. Redlands FC play their home matches at Dodge Stadium in Redlands, California. Redlands FC opened the season on May 11, 2024, against the Southern California Eagles.

== Squad information ==
As of June 2, 2024

Note: Flags indicate national team as defined under FIFA eligibility rules; some limited exceptions apply. Players may hold more than one non-FIFA nationality.

No.	Pos.	Nation	Player
1	GK	USA	Luke Garciduenas
2	DF	MEX	Juan Carlos Rodriguez
3	DF	USA	Cooper Lindfelt
4	DF	USA	Cesar Ruvalcaba
5	DF	USA	Emiliano Gutierrez
6	MF	GER	Tim Schliemann
7	FW	CMR	Dilane Zouantcha
8	MF	USA	Enzo Mauriz
9	FW	SRB	Luka Lukic
10	FW	USA	Omar Yehya
11	MF	USA	Jack Englebert
12	DF	USA	Nate Kovalcik
14	MF	GUA	Edward Castro
16	MF	USA	Christian Ceja

No.	Pos.	Nation	Player
17	FW	USA	Jarette Barajas
19	FW	SUI	Mike Moser
20	FW	USA	Noah Lopez
21	FW	USA	Mason Ward
22	FW	USA	Rommee Jaridly
23	FW	USA	Ethan Kovach
24	DF	USA	Andrew Portis
25	MF	USA	Daniel Kibrom
26	FW	USA	Andrew Taylor
27	MF	USA	Max Laguna
28	MF	USA	Anthony Vargas
30	DF	USA	Troy Elgersma
33	GK	USA	George Flores
-	MF	USA	Jacob Cervantes

== Competitions ==
=== USL League Two ===
==== Standings ====
Pos	Team	Pld	W	D	L	GF	GA	GD	Pts	PPG	Qualification
2	FC Tucson (Q)	14	7	5	2	33	18	+15	26	1.86	Advance to USL League Two Playoffs
3	AMSG FC	14	7	2	5	22	21	+1	23	1.64	
4	Redlands FC	14	6	4	4	38	28	+10	22	1.57	
5	Arizona Arsenal SC	14	4	6	4	22	23	−1	18	1.29	
6	Capo FC	14	5	2	7	29	26	+3	17	1.21	

Source: USL
(Q) Qualified for the phase indicated

==== Match results ====
May 11 1	Southern California Eagles	1-9	Redlands FC	Whittier, California
7:00 p.m. PST	Belong (yellow card) 66'; Terentieff 81'	Report	Yehya 18', 38', 50'; Lukic 31' (yellow card) 36'; Moser 36'; Ruvalcaba 66'; Elgersma 71'; Lopez 77', 85'	Stadium: Whittier College

May 18 2	Redlands FC	1-4	Capo FC	Redlands, California
7:00 p.m. PST	Lukic 40'; Yeyha (yellow card) 41'; Moser (yellow card) 83'; Zouantcha (yellow card) 90'	Report	Meade-Tatum (yellow card) 9'; Vukovic 11', (yellow card) 19'; Graznow (yellow card) 13'; Belli 46', 66'; Becovic 85'; Cortez (yellow card) 90'	Stadium: Dodge Stadium

May 25 3	Coachella FC	0-0	Redlands FC	Thermal, California
7:00 p.m. PST	Villa-Ramirez (yellow card) 43'; Mendez (yellow card) 60'; Baraka (yellow card) 89'; Rios (yellow card) 90+1'; Arita (yellow card) 90+2'	Report		Stadium: Desert Mirage High School

June 1 4	Redlands FC	3-2	AMSG FC	Redlands, California
7:00 p.m. PST	Garciduenas (yellow card) 59'; Moser (yellow card) 67'; Yeyha (yellow card) 72'; Lukic 81' 83'; Portis 90'		Lucas (yellow card) 28'; Kiplin (yellow card) 28'; Bah 37' 59' (yellow card) 83'; Villeda (yellow card) 88'	Stadium: Dodge Stadium

June 9 5	Redlands FC	1-2	FC Tucson	Redlands, California
5:00 p.m. PST	Ruvalcaba (yellow card) 30' (goal) 87'; Castro (yellow card) 68'; Moser (yellow card) 69'; Lukic (yellow card) 90+1'	Report	Valencia 14'; Santos 17'; Arnesen (yellow card) 61'; Pickett (yellow card) 75'; Svetanoff (yellow card) 86'; Slingsby (yellow card) 86'	Stadium: Dodge Stadium

June 13 6	Redlands FC	6-2	Southern California Eagles	Redlands, California
7:00 p.m. PST	Portis 8'; Englebert 12'; Lukic 26' 50'; Rodriguez 74'; Moser 88'; Kovach (yellow card) 58'	Report	Saladin 4'; Horbunov 60'	Stadium: Dodge Stadium

June 15 7	FC Tucson	5-1	Redlands FC	Tucson, Arizona
7:00 p.m. PST	Jennings 1'; Valencia 10'; Sanchez (yellow card) 45'; Kawabe 46'; Pickett 50'; Santos 69'; Svetanoff (yellow card) 82'; Ruiz (yellow card) 85'	Report	Kilbrom 83' (yellow card) 89'	Stadium: Kino North Stadium

June 17 8	AZ Arsenal	0-0	Redlands FC	Mesa, Arizona
7:00 p.m. PST	Serrano (yellow card) 72'	Report	Kovach (yellow card) 52'; Lopez (yellow card) 58'	Stadium: Arizona Athletic Grounds

June 20 9	Redlands FC	3-3	Ventura County Fusion	Redlands, California
7:00 p.m. PST	Lukic 22' 38' (yellow card) 45'; Portis 45'; Rivera (yellow card) 90'	Report	Salari 42'; Fofanah (yellow card) 58' (goal) 79'; Lezzar 64'; Calderon (yellow card) 67'; Lopez (yellow card) 70'	Stadium: Dodge Stadium

June 26 10	Redlands FC	1-0	AZ Arsenal	Redlands, California
7:00 p.m. PST	Moser 11'; Portis (yellow card) 28'; Barajas (yellow card) 30'; Ceja (yellow card) 90'	Report	White (yellow card) 30'; Serrano (yellow card) 80'	Stadium: Dodge Stadium

June 29 11	ASMG FC	0-1	Redlands FC	Westminster, California
7:00 p.m. PST	Garcia (yellow card) 53'; Puente (yellow card) 73'	Report	Lukic 50' (yellow card) 87'; Kovalcik (yellow card) 39'; Elgersma (yellow card) 53'; Ruvalcaba (yellow card) 61'; Kovach (yellow card) 90'	Stadium: Westminster High School

July 3 12	Capo FC	4-4	Redlands FC	San Juan Capistrano, California
7:00 p.m. PST	Belli 22'; Vega 32'; Cortez 85'; James 90'; Granzow (yellow card) 87'; Ward (yellow card) 90'; Bon (red card)	Report	Kovach 43' 49' 76'; Elgersma 70'; Kovalcik (yellow card) 39'; Ward (yellow card) 58'; Yehya (yellow card) 80'; Kilbrom (red card); Diaz (red card)	Stadium: JSerra Catholic High School

July 6 13	Redlands FC	8-2	Coachella FC	Redlands, California
7:00 p.m. PST	Elgersma 2'; Kovalcik 17'; Barajas 26' 81'; Englebert 33'; Moser (yellow card) 7' (goal) 49'; Lopez 52'; Kovach 59'; Benham (yellow card) 69'; Ramirez (yellow card) 83'	Report	Najera 5'; Villa-Ramirez 66' (yellow card) 17'; Wainwright (yellow card) 68'; Rios (red card)	Stadium: Dodge Stadium

July 11 14	Ventura County Fusion	3-0	Redlands FC	Ventura, California
7:00 p.m. PST	Goodman 24' 53'; Bank 59'; Lewis (yellow card) 62'	Report	Barajas (yellow card) 50'; Kovalcik (yellow card) 78'	Stadium: Ventura College

=== U.S. Open Cup ===
As a USL League Two club, Redlands FC qualified for the 2024 U.S. Open Cup by winning the Southwest Division title. They entered the first round, playing against the Los Angeles Force, ultimately losing the match 2–1.

March 20	Los Angeles Force (NISA) (California)	2–1	(California) Redlands FC (USL2)	Long Beach, California
7:30 pm PDT	Quist 40'; de Oca 84'	Report	Kovach 42'	Stadium: Long Beach City College; Attendance: 150; Referee: Trevor Wiseman
