= 2025 Redlands FC season =

USL League Two team season

Redlands FC
2025 season
- Chairman: Ryan Whiley
- Manager: Cody Carlson
- Stadium: Dodge Stadium; Redlands, California
- USL League Two: Division: 5th
- Biggest win: RED 14–0 Coachella (6/7)
- Biggest defeat: RED 0–3 City SC (7/12)

The 2025 Redlands FC season was the club's 3rd season in USL League Two, the fourth tier of the American Soccer Pyramid. Redlands FC play their home matches at Dodge Stadium in Redlands, California. Redlands FC opened the season on May 17, 2025, against Stars FC.

== Squad information ==
As of July 12, 2025

Note: Flags indicate national team as defined under FIFA eligibility rules; some limited exceptions apply. Players may hold more than one non-FIFA nationality.

| No. | Pos. | Nation | Player |
|---|---|---|---|
| - | DF | IRL | Luke Quinn |
| - | MF | USA | Vincent Saldivar |
| - | DF | USA | Lantz Gutierrez |
| 0 | GK | USA | Alexis Rodriguez |
| 1 | GK | USA | Tony Flores |
| 2 | DF | USA | Thomas Howlett |
| 3 | DF | USA | Julian Borja |
| 3 | DF | USA | Cooper Lindfelt |
| 4 | DF | USA | Andrew Portis |
| 5 | DF | USA | Brady Elliott |
| 6 | FW | USA | Sam Addo |
| 7 | MF | USA | Cody Bell |
| 8 | MF | USA | Enzo Mauriz |
| 9 | FW | SRB | Luka Lukic |
| 10 | MF | USA | Troy Elgersma |
| 11 | FW | USA | Nico Medina |

| No. | Pos. | Nation | Player |
|---|---|---|---|
| 12 | DF | USA | Sebastian Hernandez |
| 13 | DF | USA | Kristian Johnson |
| 14 | FW | USA | Javier Hernandez |
| 16 | MF | USA | Diego Chavez |
| 17 | DF | DEN | Philip Naef |
| 18 | MF | USA | Kevin Meza |
| 19 | MF | COL | Juan Manzano |
| 20 | FW | USA | Andrew Taylor |
| 21 | FW | USA | Jose De La Torre |
| 22 | DF | ENG | Joe Spencer |
| 23 | MF | NGA | Praise Maduekwe |
| 24 | FW | USA | Wyatt Ponting |
| 25 | DF | USA | Diego Ramirez |
| 25 | MF | USA | Edward Castro |
| 30 | FW | USA | Cruz Navarro |
| 34 | GK | USA | Miguel-Angel Hernandez |

== Competitions ==
=== USL League Two ===
==== Standings ====
| Pos | Team | Pld | W | D | L | GF | GA | GD | Pts | PPG |
|---|---|---|---|---|---|---|---|---|---|---|
| 3 | Capo FC | 12 | 7 | 3 | 2 | 31 | 14 | +17 | 24 | 2.00 |
| 4 | City SC | 12 | 7 | 1 | 4 | 32 | 12 | +20 | 22 | 1.83 |
| 5 | Redlands FC | 12 | 6 | 3 | 3 | 40 | 19 | +21 | 21 | 1.75 |
| 6 | AMSG FC | 12 | 5 | 3 | 4 | 31 | 18 | +13 | 18 | 1.50 |
| 7 | Southern California Eagles | 12 | 2 | 2 | 8 | 19 | 32 | −13 | 8 | 0.67 |

Updated to match(es) played on July 13, 2025. Source: USL

==== Match results ====
| May 17 1 | Redlands FC | 3–2 | Stars FC | Redlands, California |
| 7:00 p.m. PST | Lukic 35'; J. Hernandez 42' 46' | Report | Turner 45'; Price 83', (yellow card) 90'; Veloria (yellow card) 57' | Stadium: Dodge Stadium |

| May 23 2 | Stars FC | 1–2 | Redlands FC | Surprise, Arizona |
| 7:30 p.m. PST | Conteh 20'; Robertson (yellow card) 60'; Fitzgerald (yellow card) 82' | Report | Elgersma 16'; J. Hernandez 60'; S. Hernandez (yellow card) 80' | Stadium: Spirit Field |

| May 25 3 | FC Tucson | 2–1 | Redlands FC | Tucson, Arizona |
| 7:00 p.m. PST | Ruiz 7'; Montealegre 80' | Report | Spencer (yellow card) 28'; Elgersma 66'; Borja (yellow card) 71'; Portis (yellow card) 90' | Stadium: Kino North Stadium |

| June 7 4 | Coachella FC | 0–14 | Redlands FC | Cathedral City, California |
| 7:00 p.m. PST | | Report | Lukic 5', 55', 66'; J. Hernandez 9', 41', 48'; Borja 34'; Portis 44'; Ponting 58', 81', 90'; De La Torre 67'; Addo 77'; Howlett (yellow card) 77'; Bell 83' | Stadium: Cathedral City High School |

| June 11 5 | Southern California Eagles | 2–3 | Redlands FC | Fullerton, California |
| 6:00 p.m. PST | Paul 40'; Mcgreevey (yellow card) 43'; Carranza 44' | Report | J. Hernandez (yellow card) 28'; Chavez (yellow card) 35'; Elgersma 38', (yellow card) 90'; Portis (yellow card) 39'; Larson 71'; Ponting 79'; Mauriz (yellow card) 86' | Stadium: Fullerton College |

| June 14 6 | AMSG FC | 2–2 | Redlands FC | Westminster, California |
| 6:30 p.m. PST | Mitchell 32', 39' | Report | Hernandez 29'; Mauriz 45' | Stadium: Boswell Field |

| June 19 7 | Redlands FC | 2–2 | Capo FC | Redlands, California |
| 7:00 p.m. PST | De La Torre 3'; Maduekwe 34' | Report | Svoboda 30'; Sarraude 55' | Stadium: Dodge Stadium |

| June 21 8 | Redlands FC | 2–0 | FC Tucson | Redlands, California |
| 7:00 p.m. PST | Mauriz 32'; Lukic 74' | Report | | Stadium: Dodge Stadium |

| June 27 9 | Redlands FC | 2–2 | Ventura County Fusion | Redlands, California |
| 7:00 p.m. PST | Mauriz 81'; Elgersma 88'; Portis (yellow card) 40' (yellow-red card) 45' | Report | Torres 5'; Sow 28'; Sabatti (red card); Costigan (yellow card) 51' (yellow-red card) 90' | Stadium: Dodge Stadium |

| July 5 10 | Redlands FC | 7–0 | Southern California Eagles | Redlands, California |
| 7:00 p.m. PST | Elgersma 2', 71'; Ponting 5'; Hernandez 47'; Mauriz 68'; Addo 76', 89' | Report | Smith (red card) | Stadium: Dodge Stadium |

| July 9 11 | Ventura County Fusion | 3–2 | Redlands FC | Ventura, California |
| 7:00 p.m. PST | Lopez 32'; Goodman 36'; Ratoviz 85' | Report | Hernandez 4'; Meza 8' | Stadium: Ventura College Sportsplex |

| July 12 12 | Redlands FC | 0–3 | City SC | Redlands, California |
| 7:00 p.m. PST | | Report | Takara 45', 47'; Barrett 57' | Stadium: Dodge Stadium |
