= 2023 Redlands FC season =

American soccer team season

Redlands FC
2023 season
- Chairman: Ryan Whiley
- Manager: Cody Carlson
- Stadium: Dodge Stadium; Redlands, California
- USL League Two: Division: 1st
- USL League Two Playoffs: Western Conference Quarterfinals
- Biggest win: RDL 5–2 Capo (5/27); RDL 4–1 Ventura County (7/15)
- Biggest defeat: RDL 0–3 Tucson (7/8)

The 2023 Redlands FC season is the club's first season in USL League Two, the fourth tier of the United States soccer league system. Redlands FC play their home matches at Dodge Stadium in Redlands, California. Redlands FC opened the season on May 13, 2023, against FC Tucson. During their first season of play in USL League Two while competing in the Southwest Division, Redlands FC qualified for their first ever playoff appearance by finishing in first place in the Southwest Division with an 8–2–2 record for a total of 26 points for their season. They were one point ahead of both the Ventura County Fusion and FC Tucson in their division. Their first playoff match ended with a 2–1 defeat to the San Francisco Glens in the Western Conference Quarterfinals. The Redlands have yet to return to the USL League Two Playoffs following this season's conclusion.

== Squad information ==
As of November 18, 2023

Note: Flags indicate national team as defined under FIFA eligibility rules; some limited exceptions apply. Players may hold more than one non-FIFA nationality.

No.	Pos.	Nation	Player
1	GK	CAN	Nolan Premack
2	MF	USA	Cory Johnson
3	DF	USA	Cooper Lindfelt
4	DF	AUS	Thomas Beecham
5	DF	SRB	Aleksandar Vukovic
6	DF	USA	Turner Humphrey
7	FW	GER	Luis Mueller
8	MF	USA	Anthony Vargas
9	FW	USA	Noah Lopez
10	FW	USA	Omar Yehya
11	MF	USA	Jack Englebert
12	DF	USA	Nate Kovalcik
13	DF	USA	Christian Miramontes
14	FW	SRB	Luka Lukic
16	DF	USA	Joel Rivera
17	MF	USA	Alfonso Ramirez
19	FW	USA	Leo Mendez
20	DF	USA	Dylan Memory
22	FW	USA	Rommee Jaridly
23	MF	USA	Ethan Kovach
24	DF	USA	Arian Mogharei
25	MF	USA	Daniel Kibrom
28	DF	USA	Jasper Winslow
30	DF	USA	Troy Elgersma
33	GK	USA	CJ Walker

== Competitions ==
=== USL League Two ===
==== Standings ====
Pos	Team	Pld	W	D	L	GF	GA	GD	Pts	PPG	Qualification
1	Redlands FC	12	8	2	2	22	13	+9	26	2.17	Advance to USL League Two Playoffs
2	Ventura County Fusion	12	8	1	3	33	14	+19	25 (Note: Ventura County Fusion wins the tiebreaker over FC Tucson on head-to-head record.)	2.08	Advance to USL League Two Playoffs
3	FC Tucson	12	7	4	1	30	14	+16	25	2.08	
4	Southern California Seahorses	12	4	1	7	19	21	−2	13	1.08	
5	Arizona Arsenal SC	12	2	2	8	14	28	−14	8	0.67	

Source: USL

==== Match results ====
May 13, 2023 1	Redlands FC	1–1	FC Tucson	Redlands, California
7:00 PM	Yehya 14'	Report	Pilon St-Louis 45'; Costa (yellow card) 29'; Canchila (yellow card) 48'; Strauss (yellow card) 53'	Stadium: Dodge Stadium

May 17, 2023 2	Arizona Arsenal SC	0–1	Redlands FC	Mesa, Arizona
8:00 PM		Report	Lukic 40'; Memory (yellow card) 26'	Stadium: Legacy Sports Park

May 20, 2023 3	Redlands FC	2–0	Ventura County Fusion	Redlands, California
7:00 PM	Lopez 20'; Mueller 84'; Miramontes (yellow card) 25'; Beecham (yellow card) 65'; Kovalcik (yellow card) 83'; Vukovic (yellow card) 90'	Report	Farrington (yellow card) 25'	Stadium: Dodge Stadium

May 27, 2023 4	Capo FC	2–5	Redlands FC	San Juan Capistrano, California
7:00 PM	Scalzo 17'; Herrera 85'	Report	Yehya 24'; Lopez 67'; Yehya 75'; Kovach 90+2'; Lopez 90+4'; Vukovic (yellow card) 67'; Mogharei (yellow card) 91'; Lopez (yellow card) 94'	Stadium: Cougar Stadium

Jun 03, 2023 5	Redlands FC	1–1	Arizona Arsenal SC	Redlands, California
7:00 PM	Yehya 7'; Kovach (yellow card) 55'; Lukic (yellow card) 63'	Report	Weller 20'; Fisher (yellow card) 63'; Pearcy (yellow card) 71'; Hardy (yellow card) 87'	Stadium: Dodge Stadium

Jun 09, 2023 6	Ventura County Fusion	3–1	Redlands FC	Camarillo, California
7:00 PM	Farrington 7'; Fofanah 20'; Farrington 55'; Argueta (yellow card) 45'; Ricketts (yellow card) 59'; Arrington (yellow card) 89'	Report	Yehya 90'; Yehya (yellow card) 30'; Vukovic (yellow card) 59'	Stadium: Adolfo Camarillo High School Stadium

Jun 21, 2023 7	Redlands FC	2–0	Southern California Seahorses	Redlands, California
7:00 PM	Kovach 25'; Lukic 90'; Yehya (yellow card) 45'; Sime Tagne (yellow card) 68'	Report		Stadium: Dodge Stadium

Jun 24, 2023 8	Redlands FC	2–1	Capo FC	Redlands, California
7:00 PM	Humphrey 4'; Englebert 57'; Humphrey (yellow card) 51'; Espino (yellow card) 76'; Mogharei (yellow card) 81'	Report	Carvalho 11'; Xavier (yellow card) 36'; Diklic (yellow card) 67'; Montes De Oca (red card)	Stadium: Dodge Stadium

Jul 06, 2023 9	Arizona Arsenal SC	1–2	Redlands FC	Mesa, Arizona
8:00 PM	Jowett 86'; McKinzie (yellow card) 82'; Weller (yellow card) 90'	Report	Mogharei 45'; Johnson 69'; Kovalcik (yellow card) 53'; Lopez (yellow card) 61'	Stadium: Bell Bank Park Stadium

Jul 08, 2023 10	FC Tucson	3–0	Redlands FC	Tucson, Arizona
7:00 PM	Camacho 13'; Contell 23'; Armendariz 30'; Slingsby (yellow card) 82'	Report	Humphrey (yellow card) 57'; Kovalcik (yellow card) 90'	Stadium: Kino North Stadium

Jul 12, 2023 11	Southern California Seahorses	0–1	Redlands FC	Whittier, California
7:00 PM	Tuscano (yellow card) 23'; Garfias (yellow card) 70'	Report	Elgersma 61'	Stadium: Memorial Stadium

Jul 15, 2023 12	Redlands FC	4–1	Ventura County Fusion	Redlands, California
7:00 PM	Elgersma 2'; Ruvalcaba 34'; Elgersma 42'; Kibrom 47'; Memory (yellow card) 62'	Report	Shockey 90'; Rincon (yellow card) 18'; Spahr (yellow card) 21'; Calderon (yellow card) 51'	Stadium: Dodge Stadium

=== USL League Two Playoffs ===
July 21, 2023 Western Conference Quarterfinals	Redlands FC	1–2	San Francisco Glens SC	Redlands, California
7:00 PM PDT	Yehya 58' (pen.), (yellow card) 90'; Mogharei (yellow card) 89'; Kibrom (red card)	Report	Medina 21'; Ibrahim 90+8'; Hernandez (yellow card) 61'; Valdivia (yellow card) 80'; Johnsen (red card)	Stadium: Dodge Stadium; Referee: Juan Hernandez
