= 2025 USL League Two season =

USL League Two
- Season: 2025
- Dates: May 3 – July 13 (regular season)
- Champions: Vermont Green FC (1st Title)
- Regular Season Champions: FC Motown STA (1st Title)
- Matches: 894
- Goals: 3,125 (3.5 per match)
- Best Player: (Saint Lucia) Donavan Phillip Flint City Bucks
- Top goalscorer: (United States) Gage Lyons Northern Virginia FC (Saint Lucia) Donavan Phillip Flint City Bucks (12 Goals Each)
- Best goalkeeper: (United States) Jonny Mennell Asheville City SC
- Biggest home win: FCT 19–0 COA (5/30)
- Biggest away win: COA 0–16 FCT (6/14); MIA 0–16 SAR (7/05)
- Highest scoring: FCT 19–0 COA (5/30)
- Longest winning run: 11 games FC Motown STA (May 28 – July 12)
- Longest unbeaten run: 14 games Vermont Green FC (May 18 – July 11) Entire Season
- Longest winless run: 14 games Patuxent Football Athletics (May 17 – July 12); Boston City FC (May 15 – July 12) Entire Season
- Longest losing run: 12 games Miami AC (May 14 – July 5) Entire Season; Lansing City Football (May 10 – July 12) Entire Season
- All statistics correct as of 00:35, July 15, 2025 (UTC).

The 2025 USL League Two season was the 30th season of USL League Two, a semi-professional soccer league in the United States and Canada. A total of 144 teams, organized into 4 conferences and 19 divisions, participated in the 2025 season. At the beginning of the year, the Central Conference lost one division, the Deep North, but also added two new divisions, the Great Forest and Great Plains.

Vermont Green FC won their first league title by defeating Ballard FC 2–1 in the championship final that they hosted at Virtue Field in Burlington, Vermont. Green FC had an undefeated season with sixteen wins and three draws.

== Team changes ==
=== New teams ===
- Akron City FC (from NPSL)
- Annapolis Blues FC (from NPSL)
- Apotheos FC (from NPSL)
- Bigfoot FC
- City SC
- Colorado Storm
- Columbus United FC
- Delaware FC
- Denton Diablos FC (from NPSL)
- Erie Sports Center FC
- FC Miami City
- Fort Lauderdale United FC
- Global Football Innovation Academy
- King Hammer FC Columbus
- Laredo Heat
- Lexington SC
- Lonestar SC
- McKinney Chupacabras FC
- Montgomery United FC
- New England Fútbol Club
- Northern Indiana FC
- Portland Bangers FC
- Red River FC
- Santafé Wanderers FC
- San Juan SC
- Snohomish United
- Springfield FC
- Sporting Club Jacksonville
- Stars FC
- Steel City FC (from NPSL)
- St. Louis Ambush
- Sunflower State FC

=== Departing teams ===
- Arizona Arsenal SC
- Bavarian United SC (to UPSL)
- Blue Goose SC (rebrand to Red River FC)
- Capital FC Atletico (withdrew)
- Florida Elite SA (merger with Sporting Club Jacksonville)
- Michiana Lions FC
- New Mexico United U23
- Pathfinder FC
- Philadelphia Lone Star FC
- Salt City SC
- Tampa Bay United
- Thunder Bay Chill (on hiatus)
- United PDX
- Utah Avalanche

=== Moves ===
Central – Deep North to Central – Heartland

- Minneapolis City SC
- RKC Third Coast
- Rochester FC
- Saint Croix SC

Central – Heartland to Central – Great Plains

- Des Moines Menace
- Peoria City

Central – Valley to Central – Great Forest

- Cleveland Force SC
- FC Buffalo
- Toledo Villa FC

Eastern – South Atlantic to Central – Valley

- West Virginia United

=== Name changes ===
- Swan City to Kings Hammer Sun City

=== Map ===
Locations of USL League Two franchises who participated in the 2025 season.

Eastern Conference: Northeast Division Mid Atlantic Division Metropolitan Division Chesapeake Division South Atlantic Division
Central Conference: Great Forest Division Valley Division Great Lakes Division Heartland Division Great Plains Division
Southern Conference: South Central Division Southeast Division South Florida Division Mid South Division Lone Star Division
Western Conference: Mountain Division Northwest Division NorCal Division Southwest Division

Metro areas with multiple teams:

- Boston: Boston Bolts, Boston City FC
- Charlotte: Charlotte Eagles, Charlotte Independence 2
- Chicago: Chicago City Dutch Lions FC, Sueño FC
- Denver: Colorado International Soccer Academy (CISA), Colorado Storm, Flatirons Rush SC
- Detroit: Oakland County FC, Union FC Macomb
- Houston: AC Houston Sur, AHFC Royals, Houston FC
- Miami: FC Miami City, Miami AC, Weston FC
- San Francisco Bay Area: Almaden FC, Marin FC Legends, Project 51O, San Francisco City FC, San Francisco Glens SC
- Seattle: Ballard FC, Bigfoot FC, Midlakes United, West Seattle Junction FC

== Standings ==
=== Eastern Conference ===
==== Northeast Division ====
Pos	Team	Pld	W	D	L	GF	GA	GD	Pts	PPG	Qualification
1	Vermont Green FC (Q)	14	11	3	0	38	8	+30	36	2.57	Advance to USL League Two Playoffs
2	Western Mass Pioneers (Q)	14	10	3	1	46	9	+37	33	2.36	Advance to playoff qualifying round
3	Black Rock FC	14	7	4	3	24	14	+10	25	1.79	
4	AC Connecticut	14	7	1	6	22	17	+5	22	1.57	
5	NEFC	14	6	3	5	26	21	+5	21	1.50	
6	Seacoast United Phantoms	14	5	2	7	21	25	−4	17	1.21	
7	Boston Bolts	14	3	5	6	15	21	−6	14	1.00	
8	Albany Rush	14	2	1	11	13	47	−34	7	0.50	
9	Boston City FC	14	0	2	12	14	57	−43	2	0.14	

Updated to match(es) played on July 12, 2025. Source: USL
(Q) Qualified for the phase indicated

==== Mid Atlantic Division ====
Pos	Team	Pld	W	D	L	GF	GA	GD	Pts	PPG	Qualification
1	West Chester United SC (Q)	12	7	4	1	30	17	+13	25	2.08	Advance to USL League Two Playoffs
2	Ocean City Nor'easters (Q)	12	7	3	2	28	15	+13	24	2.00	Advance to playoff qualifying round
3	Reading United AC	12	4	3	5	18	22	−4	15	1.25	
4	Real Central New Jersey	12	3	5	4	19	16	+3	14	1.17	
5	Delaware FC	12	2	4	6	12	26	−14	10	0.83	
6	Lehigh Valley United	12	2	3	7	18	29	−11	9	0.75	

Updated to match(es) played on July 12, 2025. Source: USL
(Q) Qualified for the phase indicated

==== Metropolitan Division ====
Pos	Team	Pld	W	D	L	GF	GA	GD	Pts	PPG	Qualification
1	FC Motown STA (R, Q)	12	11	1	0	36	9	+27	34	2.83	Advance to USL League Two Playoffs
2	Long Island Rough Riders (Q)	12	9	1	2	32	14	+18	28	2.33	Advance to playoff qualifying round
3	Hudson Valley Hammers (Q)	12	7	3	2	21	14	+7	24	2.00	Advance to playoff qualifying round
4	Morris Elite SC	12	5	3	4	16	20	−4	18	1.50	
5	Cedar Stars Rush	12	5	1	6	16	17	−1	16	1.33	
6	Ironbound SC	12	3	4	5	16	19	−3	13	1.08	
7	Manhattan SC	12	3	2	7	20	26	−6	11	0.92	
8	New Jersey Copa FC	12	3	2	7	11	24	−13	11	0.92	
9	Staten Island Athletic SC	12	3	1	8	14	24	−10	10	0.83	
10	Westchester Flames	12	0	4	8	9	24	−15	4	0.33	

Updated to match(es) played on July 13, 2025. Source: USL
(Q) Qualified for the phase indicated; (R) Regular Season Champions

==== Chesapeake Division ====
Pos	Team	Pld	W	D	L	GF	GA	GD	Pts	PPG	Qualification
1	Northern Virginia FC (Q)	14	10	3	1	39	18	+21	33	2.36	Advance to USL League Two Playoffs
2	Lionsbridge FC (Q)	14	9	3	2	55	18	+37	30	2.14	Advance to playoff qualifying round
3	Virginia Beach United	14	9	2	3	25	14	+11	29	2.07	
4	Annapolis Blues FC	14	7	1	6	31	25	+6	22	1.57	
5	Charlottesville Blues FC	14	5	5	4	27	19	+8	20	1.43	
6	Christos FC	14	5	2	7	24	28	−4	17	1.21	
7	Virginia Marauders FC	14	1	2	11	11	49	−38	5	0.36	
8	Patuxent Football Athletics	14	0	2	12	8	49	−41	2	0.14	

Updated to match(es) played on July 12, 2025. Source: USL
(Q) Qualified for the phase indicated

==== South Atlantic Division ====
Pos	Team	Pld	W	D	L	GF	GA	GD	Pts	PPG	Qualification
1	Salem City FC (Q)	12	8	3	1	24	14	+10	27	2.25	Advance to USL League Two Playoffs
2	Charlotte Independence 2 (Q)	12	8	1	3	25	16	+9	25	2.08	Advance to playoff qualifying round
3	North Carolina FC U23	12	6	4	2	24	13	+11	22	1.83	
4	SC United Bantams	12	7	1	4	22	15	+7	22	1.83	
5	Tobacco Road FC	12	2	4	6	22	29	−7	10	0.83	
6	Charlotte Eagles	12	2	3	7	15	22	−7	9	0.75	
7	Wake FC	12	0	2	10	11	34	−23	2	0.17	

Updated to match(es) played on July 12, 2025. Source: USL
(Q) Qualified for the phase indicated

=== Central Conference ===
==== Great Forest Division ====
Pos	Team	Pld	W	D	L	GF	GA	GD	Pts	PPG	Qualification
1	Steel City (Q)	12	8	3	1	26	12	+14	27	2.25	Advance to USL League Two Playoffs
2	FC Buffalo	12	7	2	3	18	13	+5	23	1.92	
3	Akron City FC	12	5	5	2	19	11	+8	20	1.67	
4	Toledo Villa FC	12	4	3	5	20	20	0	15	1.25	
5	Cleveland Force SC	12	3	1	8	15	23	−8	10	0.83	
6	Erie Sports Center FC	12	2	0	10	11	30	−19	6	0.50	

Updated to match(es) played on July 13, 2025. Source: USL
(Q) Qualified for the phase indicated

==== Great Lakes Division ====
Pos	Team	Pld	W	D	L	GF	GA	GD	Pts	PPG	Qualification
1	Flint City Bucks (Q)	12	9	0	3	30	11	+19	27	2.25	Advance to USL League Two Playoffs
2	Midwest United FC (Q)	12	8	1	3	27	10	+17	25	2.08	Advance to USL League Two Playoffs
3	AFC Ann Arbor	12	6	3	3	21	18	+3	21	1.75	
4	Oakland County FC	12	6	2	4	22	17	+5	20	1.67	
5	Northern Indiana FC	12	5	2	5	15	19	−4	17	1.42	
6	Union FC Macomb	12	4	2	6	15	19	−4	14	1.17	
7	Kalamazoo FC	12	4	2	6	14	24	−10	14	1.17	
8	Lansing City Football	12	0	0	12	7	33	−26	0	0.00	

Updated to match(es) played on July 13, 2025. Source: USL
(Q) Qualified for the phase indicated

==== Great Plains Division ====
Pos	Team	Pld	W	D	L	GF	GA	GD	Pts	PPG	Qualification
1	Des Moines Menace (Q)	12	10	1	1	43	15	+28	31	2.58	Advance to USL League Two Playoffs
2	Peoria City (Q)	12	8	1	3	29	11	+18	25	2.08	Advance to USL League Two Playoffs
3	Sunflower State FC	12	4	2	6	22	27	−5	14	1.17	
4	Santafé Wanderers	12	4	1	7	22	33	−11	13	1.08	
5	Springfield FC	12	4	0	8	16	39	−23	12	1.00	
6	FC Ambush	12	3	1	8	19	26	−7	10	0.83	

Updated to match(es) played on July 12, 2025. Source: USL
(Q) Qualified for the phase indicated

==== Heartland Division ====
Pos	Team	Pld	W	D	L	GF	GA	GD	Pts	PPG	Qualification
1	Minneapolis City SC (Q)	12	8	2	2	31	17	+14	26	2.17	Advance to USL League Two Playoffs
2	Sueño FC (Q)	12	8	2	2	33	20	+13	26	2.17	Advance to USL League Two Playoffs
3	RKC Third Coast	12	6	4	2	31	18	+13	22	1.83	
4	Rochester FC	12	7	0	5	24	16	+8	21	1.75	
5	River Light FC	12	4	3	5	22	24	−2	15	1.25	
6	Saint Croix SC	12	2	1	9	16	30	−14	7	0.58	
7	Chicago City Dutch Lions	12	1	0	11	10	42	−32	3	0.25	

Updated to match(es) played on July 13, 2025. Source: USL
(Q) Qualified for the phase indicated

==== Valley Division ====
Pos	Team	Pld	W	D	L	GF	GA	GD	Pts	PPG	Qualification
1	Fort Wayne FC (Q)	12	9	1	2	24	8	+16	28	2.33	Advance to USL League Two Playoffs
2	Lexington SC	12	7	3	2	18	10	+8	24	2.00	
3	West Virginia United	12	5	2	5	21	18	+3	17	1.42	
4	Kings Hammer FC Columbus	12	5	1	6	17	22	−5	16	1.33	
5	Kings Hammer FC	12	2	3	7	11	23	−12	9	0.75	
6	Dayton Dutch Lions	12	2	2	8	10	20	−10	8	0.67	

Updated to match(es) played on July 12, 2025. Source: USL
(Q) Qualified for the phase indicated

=== Southern Conference ===
==== South Central Division ====
Pos	Team	Pld	W	D	L	GF	GA	GD	Pts	PPG	Qualification
1	Asheville City SC (Q)	12	10	2	0	43	3	+40	32	2.67	Advance to USL League Two Playoffs
2	Dothan United Dragons (Q)	12	10	0	2	33	6	+27	30	2.50	Advance to USL League Two Playoffs
3	Tennessee SC	12	6	3	3	19	19	0	21	1.75	
4	Birmingham Legion 2	12	5	2	5	15	21	−6	17	1.42	
5	Columbus United FC	12	5	2	5	18	15	+3	17	1.42	
6	Southern Soccer Academy Kings	12	4	2	6	13	19	−6	14	1.17	
7	Montgomery United FC	12	2	3	7	15	27	−12	9	0.75	
8	East Atlanta Dutch Lions	12	3	0	9	9	34	−25	9	0.75	
9	Apotheos FC	12	1	2	9	9	30	−21	5	0.42	
10	Athens United	0	0	0	0	0	0	0	0	—	

Updated to match(es) played on July 12, 2025. Source: USL
(Q) Qualified for the phase indicated

==== Southeast Division ====
Pos	Team	Pld	W	D	L	GF	GA	GD	Pts	PPG	Qualification
1	Sporting Club Jacksonville (Q)	12	8	1	3	23	11	+12	25	2.08	Advance to USL League Two Playoffs
2	NONA FC	12	8	0	4	17	7	+10	24	2.00	
3	Brave SC	12	7	2	3	32	13	+19	23	1.92	
4	Brooke House FC	12	4	2	6	11	23	−12	14	1.17	
5	Inter Gainesville KF	12	4	0	8	11	19	−8	12	1.00	
6	Brevard SC	12	2	1	9	12	33	−21	7	0.58	

Updated to match(es) played on July 14, 2025. Source: USL
(Q) Qualified for the phase indicated

==== South Florida Division ====
Pos	Team	Pld	W	D	L	GF	GA	GD	Pts	PPG	Qualification
1	Sarasota Paradise (Q)	12	9	2	1	37	8	+29	29	2.42	Advance to USL League Two Playoffs
2	Fort Lauderdale United FC (Q)	12	8	2	2	21	10	+11	26	2.17	Advance to USL League Two Playoffs
3	St. Petersburg FC	12	8	2	2	35	13	+22	26	2.17	
4	FC Miami City	12	4	4	4	24	22	+2	16	1.33	
5	Kings Hammer FC Sun City	12	4	2	6	13	19	−6	14	1.17	
6	Weston FC	12	2	2	8	15	30	−15	8	0.67	
7	Miami AC	12	0	0	12	6	49	−43	0	0.00	

Updated to match(es) played on July 12, 2025. Source: USL
(Q) Qualified for the phase indicated

==== Mid South Division ====
Pos	Team	Pld	W	D	L	GF	GA	GD	Pts	PPG	Qualification
1	Little Rock Rangers (Q)	12	8	3	1	25	6	+19	27	2.25	Advance to USL League Two Playoffs
2	Louisiana Krewe FC (Q)	12	8	2	2	26	14	+12	26	2.17	Advance to USL League Two Playoffs
3	Hattiesburg FC	12	7	2	3	21	11	+10	23	1.92	
4	Denton Diablos FC	12	7	1	4	27	18	+9	22	1.83	
5	McKinney Chupacabras FC	12	3	1	8	19	40	−21	10	0.83	
6	Red River Rangers	12	1	3	8	11	30	−19	6	0.50	
7	Mississippi Brilla	12	0	4	8	8	18	−10	4	0.33	

Updated to match(es) played on July 14, 2025. Source: USL
(Q) Qualified for the phase indicated

==== Lone Star Division ====
Pos	Team	Pld	W	D	L	GF	GA	GD	Pts	PPG	Qualification
1	Laredo Heat (Q)	12	11	0	1	36	12	+24	33	2.75	Advance to USL League Two Playoffs
2	Corpus Christi FC	12	6	3	3	22	15	+7	21	1.75	
3	AHFC Royals	12	6	2	4	27	17	+10	20	1.67	
4	Lonestar SC	11	6	0	5	22	22	0	18	1.64	
5	Houston FC	12	5	3	4	17	15	+2	18	1.50	
6	Twin City Toucans FC	12	5	2	5	19	23	−4	17	1.42	
7	Hill Country Lobos	12	3	2	7	26	30	−4	11	0.92	
8	Global Football Innovation Academy	12	3	2	7	17	24	−7	11	0.92	
9	AC Houston Sur	11	0	2	9	4	32	−28	2	0.18	

Updated to match(es) played on July 13, 2025. Source: USL
(Q) Qualified for the phase indicated

=== Western Conference ===
==== Mountain Division ====
Pos	Team	Pld	W	D	L	GF	GA	GD	Pts	PPG	Qualification
1	Utah United (Q)	12	8	1	3	28	9	+19	25	2.08	Advance to USL League Two Playoffs
2	Colorado Storm (Q)	12	7	1	4	29	14	+15	22	1.83	Advance to USL League Two Playoffs
3	Albion SC Colorado	12	7	1	4	25	16	+9	22	1.83	
4	Flatirons SC	12	5	2	5	15	16	−1	17	1.42	
5	CISA	12	0	1	11	5	47	−42	1	0.08	

Updated to match(es) played on July 12, 2025. Source: USL
(Q) Qualified for the phase indicated

==== Northwest Division ====
Pos	Team	Pld	W	D	L	GF	GA	GD	Pts	PPG	Qualification
1	Ballard FC (Q)	14	9	3	2	36	7	+29	30	2.14	Advance to USL League Two Playoffs
2	Snohomish United (Q)	14	8	2	4	26	18	+8	26	1.86	Advance to USL League Two Playoffs
3	Lane United FC	14	7	4	3	27	17	+10	25	1.79	
4	Portland Bangers FC	14	6	3	5	16	15	+1	21	1.50	
5	Midlakes United	14	4	5	5	20	27	−7	17	1.21	
6	West Seattle Junction FC	14	4	4	6	22	27	−5	16	1.14	
7	FC Olympia	14	4	3	7	28	29	−1	15	1.07	
8	Bigfoot FC	14	3	6	5	27	33	−6	15	1.07	
9	Tacoma Stars FC	14	1	4	9	12	41	−29	7	0.50	

Updated to match(es) played on July 13, 2025. Source: USL
(Q) Qualified for the phase indicated

==== Nor Cal Division ====
Pos	Team	Pld	W	D	L	GF	GA	GD	Pts	PPG	Qualification
1	Almaden FC (Q)	14	9	1	4	27	12	+15	28	2.00	Advance to USL League Two Playoffs
2	San Juan SC (Q)	14	9	1	4	40	18	+22	28	2.00	Advance to USL League Two Playoffs
3	San Francisco Glens SC	14	7	4	3	27	16	+11	25	1.79	
4	San Francisco City FC	14	6	4	4	25	21	+4	22	1.57	
5	Project 51O	14	5	6	3	22	24	−2	21	1.50	
6	Academica SC	14	4	5	5	14	22	−8	17	1.21	
7	Marin FC Legends	14	4	2	8	20	35	−15	14	1.00	
8	Davis Legacy SC	14	3	2	9	14	26	−12	11	0.79	
9	Monterey Bay FC 2	14	2	3	9	9	24	−15	9	0.64	

Updated to match(es) played on July 12, 2025. Source: USL
(Q) Qualified for the phase indicated

==== Southwest Division ====
Pos	Team	Pld	W	D	L	GF	GA	GD	Pts	PPG	Qualification
1	Ventura County Fusion (Q)	12	9	1	2	33	11	+22	28	2.33	Advance to USL League Two Playoffs
2	FC Tucson (Q)	12	7	3	2	55	11	+44	24	2.00	Advance to USL League Two Playoffs
3	Capo FC	12	7	3	2	31	14	+17	24	2.00	
4	City SC	12	7	1	4	32	12	+20	22	1.83	
5	Redlands FC	12	6	3	3	40	19	+21	21	1.75	
6	AMSG FC	12	5	3	4	31	18	+13	18	1.50	
7	Southern California Eagles	12	2	2	8	19	32	−13	8	0.67	
8	Stars FC	12	1	3	8	23	29	−6	6	0.50	
9	Coachella FC	12	0	1	11	8	126	−118	1	0.08	

Updated to match(es) played on July 13, 2025. Source: USL
(Q) Qualified for the phase indicated

== Playoffs ==
=== Bracket ===
Conference Quarterfinals	Conference Semifinals
Vermont Green FC*	4
Hudson Valley Hammers	1
Vermont Green FC*	3
FC Motown STA	2
FC Motown STA	2
Western Mass Pioneers	1
Eastern Conference
Lionsbridge FC*	4
Salem City FC	0
Lionsbridge FC*	2
Northern Virginia FC	1
Northern Virginia FC	2
West Chester United SC	0
Sarasota Paradise*	2
Sporting Club Jacksonville	0
Sarasota Paradise*	1
Fort Lauderdale United FC	2
Laredo Heat SC	1
Fort Lauderdale United FC (a.e.t.)	2
Southern Conference
Dothan United Dragons*	1
Little Rock Rangers	0
Dothan United Dragons*	1
Louisiana Krewe FC	0
Asheville City SC	2
Louisiana Krewe FC	3
Flint City Bucks*	4
Steel City FC	3
Flint City Bucks* (a.e.t.)	2
Fort Wayne FC	0
Fort Wayne FC (a.e.t.)	3
Midwest United FC	2
Central Conference
Des Moines Menace*	2
Sueño FC	4
Sueño FC	0
Minneapolis City SC	2
Minneapolis City SC	2 (4)
Peoria City	2 (1)
Ballard FC*	6
Colorado Storm	0
Ballard FC*	2
Snohomish United	1
Utah United	0
Snohomish United	2
Western Conference
Ventura County Fusion*	2
San Juan SC	1
Ventura County Fusion*	2
FC Tucson	0
Almaden FC	1 (0)
FC Tucson	1 (2)

Conference Finals
Vermont Green FC* (a.e.t.)	3
Lionsbridge FC	1
Fort Lauderdale United FC	1
Dothan United Dragons	2
Flint City Bucks	2
Minneapolis City SC	1
Ballard FC*	2
Ventura County Fusion	1

National Semifinals
Vermont Green FC*	0 (4)
Dothan United Dragons	0 (2)
Flint City Bucks	1
Ballard FC*	2

National Final
Vermont Green FC*	2
Ballard FC	1

=== Eastern Conference Qualifying Round ===
July 15	Lionsbridge FC	4–1	Charlotte Independence II	TowneBank Stadium; Newport News, Virginia
7:30 PM EDT	Gallegos 16'; Ulrich (yellow card) 42'; Hall (yellow card) 50'; Louis 52', 56', 80'	Report	De La Parra (yellow card) 38'; Herrera 49'	Referee: Eugene Arnold

July 15	Western Mass Pioneers	2–0	Long Island Rough Riders	Lusitano Stadium; Ludlow, Massachusetts
7:30 PM EDT	Sheppard (yellow card) 8'; Jiana 26'; Hermoso (yellow card) 37'; Smith (yellow card) 51'; Gomez 73'; Barbosa (yellow card) 80'	Report	Da Costa (yellow card) 67'; Nguepissi (yellow card) 78'; Lovelace (yellow card) 90'	Referee: Ganesh Anantharaman

July 15	Ocean City Nor'easters	1–3	Hudson Valley Hammers	Carey Stadium; Ocean City, New Jersey
7:30 PM EDT	Kawata 3' (pen.); Nuss (yellow card) 42'; Blegay (yellow card) 63'; Holmstrom (yellow card) 90'	Report	Evans 8'; Zielonka 9'; Akanbo (yellow card) 10' (goal) 89'; Diponzio (yellow card) 72'; Dipreta (yellow card) 75'	Referee: Luke Bernstein

=== Eastern Conference ===
July 18 Conference Quarterfinals	FC Motown STA	2–1	Western Mass Pioneers	Virtue Field; Burlington, Vermont
4:00 PM EDT	Ittycheria 57'; Garnette 65'; Kilic (yellow card) 69'	Report	Barbosa (yellow card) 44'; Jiana 67' (yellow card) 69' (red card) 90'; Smith (yellow card) 90'	Referee: Corey Cenate

July 18 Conference Quarterfinals	Northern Virginia FC	2–0	West Chester United SC	TowneBank Stadium; Newport News, Virginia
4:00 PM EDT	Hall 4', 52'; Fuentes (yellow card) 45'; Dean (yellow card) 67'	Report	Guinle (yellow card) 70'; Teduits (yellow card) 88'; Whitchurch (yellow card) 90'	Referee: Tony Chevez

July 18 Conference Quarterfinals	Vermont Green FC	4–1	Hudson Valley Hammers	Virtue Field; Burlington, Vermont
7:00 PM EDT	Tattevin 52' (pen.), 56', 61' (pen.); Le Bourdoulous (yellow card) 55'; Zellefrow 90'	Report	Akanbo (yellow card) 15'; Diponzio (yellow card) 33'; Zielonka 47'; Dipreta (yellow card) 51'; Bonsu (yellow card) 78'; Kresse (yellow card) 90'	Attendance: 2,700; Referee: Michele Beagan

July 18 Conference Quarterfinals	Lionsbridge FC	4–0	Salem City FC	TowneBank Stadium; Newport News, Virginia
7:30 PM EDT	Healy 14', 58'; Rodriguez 35'; Hall 67' (pen.); Lopes (yellow card) 81'	Report	Lorentz (yellow card) 36'; Sears (yellow card) 70'; Bruletti (yellow card) 83'; Cañas (yellow card) 88'	Referee: Samuel Callender

July 20 Conference Semifinals	Vermont Green FC	3–2	FC Motown STA	Virtue Field; Burlington, Vermont
6:00 PM EDT	O'Malley 65'; Kissel 67'; Le Bourdoulous 73' (pen.) (yellow card) 89'; Ajagbe (yellow card) 77'	Report	Hope (yellow card) 3'; Ruitenberg 19'; Garnette 47' (pen.); Niehenke (yellow card) 49'; Ruiz (yellow card) 64'; Rutkowski (yellow card) 72'; Levy (yellow card) 90'; Kilic (yellow card) 90'	Attendance: 2,700; Referee: Naoufal Hmiddouche

July 20 Conference Semifinals	Lionsbridge FC	2–1	Northern Virginia FC	TowneBank Stadium; Newport News, Virginia
7:00 PM EDT	Hatley 4'; Hall 37' (yellow card) 45+'; Materazzi (yellow card) 72'	Report	Balkey (yellow card) 60'; Ayolmbong 68' (yellow card) 90+'; Dean (yellow card) 74'; Avelar (yellow card) 86'; Reyes (red card) 90+'	Referee: Paul Laufer

July 25 Conference Final	Vermont Green FC	3–1 (a.e.t.)	Lionsbridge FC	Virtue Field; Burlington, Vermont
7:00 PM EDT	Rived (yellow card) 25'; Abbey 44'; Hall (yellow card) 90'; Tattevin (yellow card) 90' (goal) 104'; O'Malley 116' (yellow card) 116'	Report	Howard 40'; Purks (yellow card) 90'	Attendance: 3,700; Referee: Joshua Grzyb

=== Southern Conference ===
July 18 Conference Quarterfinals	Laredo Heat SC	1–2 (a.e.t.)	Fort Lauderdale United FC	Premier Sports Campus; Sarasota, Florida
4:00 PM EDT	Orduy (red card) 10'; Ibarra (yellow card) 13' (red card) 90+6'; Meza 45+8'; Bonnaire (yellow card) 78'; Esquivel (yellow card) 81'; Flores (red card); Cho (yellow card) 90+5'; Montoya (yellow card) 105+3'	Report	Morral 45+' (pen.) (yellow card) 95'; Schumaker 95'; Leyva (yellow card) 105+3'	Referee: David Blikstad

July 18 Conference Quarterfinals	Asheville City SC	2–3	Louisiana Krewe FC	Rip Hewes Stadium; Dothan, Alabama
6:30 PM EDT	Carlson 11' (red card) 45+3'; Resch (yellow card) 19'; Vignali (yellow card) 45+3'; Wells (red card) 45+3'; Ormo 73'; Creek (yellow card) 82'; Fontana (yellow card) 88'	Report	Jenkins 6' (yellow card) 67'; Mur 28', 48'; Nero (yellow card) 88'	Referee: Dorian Del Toro

July 18 Conference Quarterfinals	Sarasota Paradise	2–0	Sporting Club Jacksonville	Premier Sports Campus; Sarasota, Florida
7:30 PM EDT	Khodri 43'; Freire 70'; Leon (yellow card) 79'	Report	Gyamfi (yellow card) 71'; Doyle (yellow card) 80' (yellow-red card) 85'; Newsome (yellow card) 90'	Attendance: 1,300; Referee: Mcjurry Clerveaux

July 18 Conference Quarterfinals	Dothan United Dragons	1–0	Little Rock Rangers	Rip Hewes Stadium; Dothan, Alabama
8:30 PM EDT	White (yellow card) 31'; Nardi (yellow card) 41'; Goddard 74'; Zurita (yellow card) 90'; Vallejo (yellow card) 90'	Report		Referee: Ethan Wilson

July 20 Conference Semifinals	Dothan United Dragons	2–0	Louisiana Krewe FC	Rip Hewes Stadium; Dothan, Alabama
7:00 PM EDT	Strumeier (yellow card) 55'; Goddard 68', 90'; Vallejo (yellow card) 71'; Treminio (yellow card) 88'	Report	Cordes (yellow card) 5'; Agurcia (yellow card) 45'; Duran Jr. (yellow card) 64'	Referee: Dan Benson

July 20 Conference Semifinals	Sarasota Paradise	1–2	Fort Lauderdale United FC	Premier Sports Campus; Sarasota, Florida
8:00 PM EDT	Leon (yellow card) 21'; Barnett (yellow card) 36'; Solari (yellow card) 38'; Dahlen 48'; Khodri (yellow card) 49'; Freire (yellow card) 90' (red card) 90+'; Dakovic (yellow card) 90'; Rodriguez (red card) 90+'; Kilstrom (red card) 90+'	Report	Hall 2' (yellow card) 54'; Valles (yellow card) 69'; Belgrove 90'	Referee: Preston Joyner

July 25 Conference Final	Dothan United Dragons	2–1	Fort Lauderdale United FC	Virtue Field; Burlington, Vermont
4:00 PM EDT	Hoyos 16', 20'; Nardi (yellow card) 70'; Darub (yellow card) 75'	Report	Morral (yellow card) 22'; Belgrove (yellow card) 47'; Appiah 65'	Referee: Steven Cardoso

=== Central Conference ===
July 18 Conference Quarterfinals	Fort Wayne FC	3–2 (a.e.t.)	Midwest United FC	Atwood Stadium; Flint, Michigan
3:00 PM EDT	Campos (yellow card) 25'; Dias (yellow card) 30' (goal) 51'; Hernandez (yellow card) 39'; Gerber (yellow card) 85'; Oliveira 90+5' (yellow card) 90+7'; Sproat (yellow card) 90+5'; Umar (yellow card) 108'; Avery (yellow card) 116'; Fowlkes 118'	Report	Barone (yellow card) 16'; Ingavi (yellow card) 37'; Shannon 38'; Fernandez (yellow card) 39'; Sylejmani 44'; Mcaleenan (yellow card) 62'; Ruff (yellow card) 71'; Bowie (yellow card) 82'; Stout (yellow card) 88'; Adamson (yellow card) 89' (yellow-red card) 120'; Ganga (yellow card) 90+5' (yellow-red card) 120'; Shannon (yellow card) 90+5' (red card) 120'; Clemitson (yellow card) 90+5'; Takawira (yellow card) 117' (red card) 120'; Lockey (yellow card) 120'	Referee: Jason Cross

July 18 Conference Quarterfinals	Minneapolis City SC	2–2 (a.e.t.) (4–1 p)	Peoria City	Valley Stadium; West Des Moines, Iowa
4:00 PM EDT	Highfield 2'; Heckenlaible (yellow card) 17'; Swallen (yellow card) 45+4'; Kent (yellow card) 47'; Kipnusu 69'; Kirsch (yellow card) 74'; Mena (yellow card) 103'	Report	Persenico 13', 66' (pen.); Gomez (yellow card) 15'; Fontana (yellow card) 53'; Gibson (yellow card) 55'; Reddy (yellow card) 90+'; Benson (yellow card) 90+'; Dickerson (yellow card) 90+'; Valverde (yellow card) 105'	Referee: Theron Hitchman
	Penalties
	Swallen (penalty scored); Olson (penalty scored); Anderson (penalty scored); Kowalski (penalty scored)		(penalty missed) Paskus; (penalty missed) Valverde; (penalty scored) Mejias

July 18 Conference Quarterfinals	Flint City Bucks	4–3	Steel City FC	Atwood Stadium; Flint, Michigan
7:30 PM EDT	Phillip 10', 29'; Carnevale 65'; Ayella 90'	Report	Hadran 4'; Bordoy 17'; Mcintosh (yellow card) 54'; Fiscus (yellow card) 68'; Kopay 90+'	Attendance: 4,000; Referee: Evan Barnett

July 18 Conference Quarterfinals	Des Moines Menace	2–4	Sueño FC	Valley Stadium; West Des Moines, Iowa
8:00 PM EDT	Saavedra (yellow card) 26'; Bachstein 49', 79'	Report	Eisa (yellow card) 14'; Bogard 18', 45', 57'; Nesci 63'	Referee: Noah Brenny

July 20 Conference Semifinals	Flint City Bucks	2–0 (a.e.t.)	Fort Wayne FC	Atwood Stadium; Flint, Michigan
7:00 PM EDT	Jones (yellow card) 72'; Denis (yellow card) 90'; Phillip 118'; Ayella 120+4' (yellow card) 120+5'	Report	D’Almeida (yellow card) 40'; Traore (yellow card) 105'; Dias (yellow card) 114'	Referee: Aaron Fong

July 20 Conference Semifinals	Sueño FC	0–2	Minneapolis City SC	Valley Stadium; West Des Moines, Iowa
8:00 PM EDT	Firs (yellow card) 8'; Kelner (yellow card) 30'	Report	Kipnusu 12'; Heckenlaible 31'; Bechtel (yellow card) 62'	Referee: Ryan Bevins

July 25 Conference Final	Flint City Bucks	2–1	Minneapolis City SC	Interbay Stadium; Seattle, Washington
5:00 PM EDT	Phillip 27', 84'; Muns (yellow card) 28'; Kedgley (yellow card) 67'; Arntsen (yellow card) 89'	Report	Olson 6'; Hecht (yellow card) 41'; Oliver (yellow card) 69'; Schrage (yellow card) 71'	Referee: Nicholas Duncan

=== Western Conference ===
July 18 Conference Quarterfinals	Utah United	0–2	Snohomish United	Interbay Stadium; Seattle, Washington
5:00 PM EDT	Ulrich (yellow card) 47'	Report	Gay 47' (yellow card) 77'; Lagos 82'	Referee: Kody Chanthavong

July 18 Conference Quarterfinals	Almaden FC	1–1 (a.e.t.) (0–2 p)	FC Tucson	Ventura College Sportsplex; Ventura, California
5:00 PM EDT	Cook (yellow card) 54'; Heisner (yellow card) 61'; Vargas-Rios (yellow card) 78'; Barajas (yellow card) 84'; Kengeye (yellow card) 103'; Paterson 118'	Report	Andrews (yellow card) 44'; Idiakhoa (yellow card) 68'; Sanchez (yellow card) 105'; Gutierrez 112'	Referee: Mike Berke
	Penalties
	Penalty missed		(penalty missed) Christensen; (penalty missed) Joiner; (penalty scored) Arras; (penalty scored) Boccuzzo

July 18 Conference Quarterfinals	Ballard FC	6–0	Colorado Storm	Interbay Stadium; Seattle, Washington
10:00 PM EDT	Dale 31'; Otero 48'; Kosakoff 49'; Engmann 73', 90'; Grey 83'; Yehya (yellow card) 90'	Report	Liston (yellow card) 82'	Attendance: 1,539; Referee: Jonathan McKenzie

July 18 Conference Quarterfinals	Ventura County Fusion	2–1	San Juan SC	Ventura College Sportsplex; Ventura, California
10:00 PM EDT	C. Goodman (yellow card) 9' (goal) 13'; L. Goodman (yellow card) 30'; Inguez 34'	Report	Rice 75'; Fernandez (yellow card) 88'	Referee: Mike Berke

July 20 Conference Semifinals	Ballard FC	2–1	Snohomish United	Interbay Stadium; Seattle, Washington
5:00 PM EDT	Ch. Engmann (yellow card) 4'; Sent 9'; Zemenfes (yellow card) 30'; Otero 64'; Kosakoff (yellow card) 75'; Yehya (yellow card) 80'; Cy. Engmann (yellow card) 82'; Ramsey (yellow card) 88'; Apolinar (yellow card) 89'	Report	Leon (yellow card) 7'; McGlynn 20'; Gay (yellow card) 32'; Civitts (yellow card) 40'; Soto (yellow card) 55'	Attendance: 1,500; Referee: Nicholas Duncan

July 20 Conference Semifinals	Ventura County Fusion	2–0	FC Tucson	Ventura College Sportsplex; Ventura, California
10:00 PM EDT	Goodman (yellow card) 29'; Torres (yellow card) 42' (goal) 68'; Iniguez 54'	Report	Gonzalez (yellow card) 72'; Soto (yellow card) 88'	Referee: Anthony Almeida

July 25 Conference Final	Ballard FC	2–1	Ventura County Fusion	Interbay Stadium; Seattle, Washington
10:30 PM EDT	Dale 31'; Kosakoff 48'; Yehya (yellow card) 81'; Riley (yellow card) 90'	Report	Torres (yellow card) 11'; Costigan (yellow card) 80'; Fofanah (yellow card) 82'; Baltes 90+5'	Attendance: 1,791; Referee: Deniz Muhittinoglu

=== National Semifinals ===
July 27 National Semifinal	Vermont Green FC	0–0 (a.e.t.) (4–2 p)	Dothan United Dragons	Virtue Field; Burlington, Vermont
6:30 PM EDT	Ajagbe (yellow card) 52'; Zengue (yellow card) 89'; Fernandez (yellow card) 90+3'; O'Malley (yellow card) 105'; Aoki (yellow card) 119'; Le Bourdoulous (yellow card) 120'	Report	Nardi (yellow card) 30'; Hallenberger (yellow card) 44'; Hoyos (yellow card) 63'; Noecker (yellow card) 119'	Attendance: 4,000+ Referee: Andre Carr
	Penalties
	Zengue (penalty missed); Hall (penalty scored); Le Bourdoulous (penalty scored); Kissel (penalty scored); O'Malley (penalty scored)		(penalty missed) Goddard; (penalty scored) Noecker; (penalty scored) Vallejo; (penalty missed) Salas

July 27 National Semifinal	Ballard FC	2–1	Flint City Bucks	Interbay Stadium; Seattle, Washington
5:30 PM PDT	Engmann (yellow card) 16'; Ketcham (yellow card) 39'; Kosakoff 58', 75'; Mungomba (yellow card) 82'	Report	Phillip 50'; Werthmuller (yellow card) 90'	Attendance: 1,500; Referee: Matthew Connolly

=== USL League Two Championship Game ===
August 2
7:00 PM EDT
National Championship

Vermont Green FC	2–1	Ballard FC
Le Bourdoulous 50' (pen.); Akoum (yellow card) 54'; Kissel 90+1' (yellow card) 90+4'	Report 1 Report 2	Aman (yellow card) 43'; Dale (yellow card) 56'; Sent (yellow card) 58'; Kosakoff 62'; Riley (yellow card) 74' (red card) 90+5'; Philibbosian (yellow card) 80'; Apolinar (yellow card) 90+5'

Virtue Field
Burlington, Vermont
Attendance: 5,000
Referee: Mario Maric

Championship MVP: (France) Julien Le Bourdoulous Vermont Green FC

== Awards ==
=== Monthly Awards ===
Team of the Month
Month	Goalkeeper	Defenders	Midfielders	Forwards	Ref.
May	(Netherlands) van Haveren (FTL)	(Scotland) Gray (LRR) (United States) Briscoe (BAL) (Senegal) Ndiaye (VER)	(Germany) Ewald (LIO) (Venezuela) Zambrano (FTL) (United States) Silva (UTU) (United States) Persenico (PEO)	(England) Stainrod (LIR) (United States) Giles (SJS) (United States) Battistessa (SJS)	
June	(United States) Mennell (ASH)	(United States) Williams (MOT) (England) Edmondson (VBU) (United States) Ogunleye (SUE)	(United States) Graeca (STE) (United States) Burkhardt (NEFC) (United States) Mauriz (RED) (United States) Hardin (LRR)	(Portugal) Lopes (STP) (United States) Backstein (DMM) (Argentina) Rossi Molinas (LUF)	

=== Yearly Awards ===
Award	Winner	Team	Reason	Ref.
Golden Boot	(United States) Gage Lyons	Northern Virginia FC	12 Goals in 11 games	
Golden Boot	(Saint Lucia) Donavan Phillip	Flint City Bucks	12 Goals in 12 games	
Golden Glove	(United States) Jonny Mennell	Asheville City SC	0.27 Goals Against Average; 9 Shutouts	
Young (U20) Player of the Year	(Ghana) Osei Gyamfi	Sporting JAX	7 Goals including a Hat Trick	
Defender of the Year	(Senegal) Moussa Ndiaye	Vermont Green FC	had an 83.8% passing rate in the middle and defensive-thirds and averaged 38 medium-range passes per game	
Player of the Year	(Saint Lucia) Donavan Phillip	Flint City Bucks	12 goals, 9 Assists in 12 games	
Goal of the Year	(United States) Owen O'Malley	Vermont Green FC	vs Western Mass Pioneers	
Coach of the Year	(England) Tom Shields	FC Motown STA	First ever Regular Season Championship	

Divisional Players of the Year
Division	Player	Team
Eastern Conference
Chesapeake	(United States) Gage Lyons	Northern Virginia FC
Metropolitan	(United States) Mo Williams	FC Motown STA
Mid-Atlantic	(Brazil) Rafael Kawata	Ocean City Nor'easters
Northeast	(Senegal) Moussa Ndiaye	Vermont Green FC
South Atlantic	(United States) Drew Kerr	North Carolina FC U23
Central Conference
Great Forest	(United States) Nicholas Graeca	Steel City FC
Great Lakes	(Saint Lucia) Donavan Phillip	Flint City Bucks
Great Plains	(United States) Dominick Bachstein	Des Moines Menace
Heartland	(United States) Jacob Swallen	Minneapolis City SC
Valley	(Portugal) Tiago Dias	Fort Wayne FC
Southern Conference
Lone Star	(Spain) Nacho Abeal	Corpus Christi FC
Mid South	(United States) Alejandro Padilla	Little Rock Rangers
South Central	(United States) Jonny Mennell	Asheville City SC
South Florida	(Venezuela) Carlos Zambrano	Fort Lauderdale United FC
Southeast	(Ghana) Osei Gyamfi	Sporting JAX
Western Conference
Mountain	(United States) Tobi Osifodunrin	Colorado Storm
Nor Cal	(United States) Adrian Guzman	San Francisco Glens SC
Northwest	(Ethiopia) Abeselom Zemenfes	Ballard FC
Southwest	(France) Alexis Ledoux	FC Tucson

== Conference Teams of the Year ==
=== Eastern Conference ===
F: (England) Evan Howard (LIO), (England) Jack Stainrod (LIR), (United States) Gage Lyons (NOVA)
M: (Brazil) Theo Da Silva (OCN), (United States) Zachary Zengue (VER), (Brazil) Israel Neto (WMP)
D: (United States) Liam Evans (HVH), (United States) Maurice Williams (STA), (Senegal) Moussa Ndiaye (VER)*, (Canada) Nathan Goulet (SAL)
G: (United States) Alan Rutkowski (STA)

=== Southern Conference ===
F: (Portugal) Rodrigo Lopes (STP), (Spain) Nacho Abeal (CRP), (Belgium) Edouard Nys (ASH)
M: (United States) Jack Clarkson (AHFC), (Venezuela) Carlos Zambrano (FTL) *, (England) Laurie Goddard (DOT)
D: (United States) Alejandro Padilla (LRR), (United States) Lukas Kamrath (SAR), (Spain) Guillermo Garcia (LAK), (South Korea) Yurok Cho (LAR) *
G: (United States) Jonny Mennell (ASH)

=== Central Conference ===
F: (Saint Lucia) Donavan Phillip (FCB)*, (United States) Dominick Bachstein (DMM), (United States) DJ Koulai (PEO)
M: (United States) Jackson Kirsch (MCS), (United States) Nicholas Graeca (STC), (United States) Antonio Costabile (SUE)
D: (United States) Ryan Quintos (RVL), (United States) Christian Shannon (MDW), (Portugal) Tiago Dias (FTW), (England) Ellis Jones (FCB)
G: (Puerto Rico) Aurie Briscoe (FTW)

=== Western Conference ===
F: (England) Arnold Matshazi (ALM), (United States) Sean Battistessa (SJS), (United States) Tobi Osifodunrin (COL)
M: (United States) Adrian Guzman (SFG), (United States) Connor Lofy (SNO), (United States) Ethan Doud (LUF)
D: (United States) D'Andre Pickett (TUC), (United States) Alex Fritcher (UTU), (Ethiopia) Abeselom Zemenfes (BAL)*, (United States) Andres Torres (VCF)
G: (United States) Roark Looney (UTU)

* denotes Player of the Conference
