= 2026 Redlands FC season =

USL League Two team season

Redlands FC
2026 season
- Chairman: Ryan Whiley
- Manager: Cody Carlson
- Stadium: Dodge Stadium; Redlands, California
- USL League Two: Division: 3rd
- USL League Two Playoffs: Did not qualify
- Biggest win: RED 5–1 Eagles (6/20)
- Biggest defeat: RED 0-1 Tucson (5/23); RED 2-3 Capo (7/2)

The 2026 Redlands FC season is the club's 4th season in USL League Two, the fourth tier of the American Soccer Pyramid. Redlands FC play their home matches at Dodge Stadium in Redlands, California. Redlands FC opened the season on May 23, 2026, against FC Tucson.

== Squad information ==
As of July 13, 2026

Note: Flags indicate national team as defined under FIFA eligibility rules; some limited exceptions apply. Players may hold more than one non-FIFA nationality.

No.	Pos.	Nation	Player
0	GK	USA	Keegan O'Brien
1	GK	USA	Tony Flores
2	DF	USA	Abraham Brown
3	DF	USA	Julian Borja
4	DF	USA	Darwin Lopez
5	DF	USA	Matti Richter
6	MF	USA	Daniel Gutierrez ("Tati")
7	MF	DEN	Philip Naef
8	MF	USA	Jose Garcia ("Chicha")
9	FW	USA	Wyatt Ponting
10	MF	USA	Jose De La Torre
11	MF	USA	Efren Nunez Dominguez
12	FW	USA	Marcus Lee
13	DF	USA	Kristian Johnson
14	FW	USA	Diego Lopez-Rosales
15	DF	GER	Mika Kosch
17	FW	USA	Mason Ward
18	MF	USA	Kevin Meza
19	MF	USA	Jonah Kawamura
20	FW	MNE	Andrija Radonjic
21	FW	GHA	Clement Badger
22	DF	USA	Lantz Gutierrez
23	DF	USA	Mason Moreno
24	DF	USA	Adrian Diaz
29	DF	USA	Liam Mcfarlane
30	MF	USA	Juan Calderon
34	GK	USA	Tait Whittemore

== Non-competitive matches ==
June 13, 2026 Friendly	Redlands FC	8–3	KickABallPod JUCO Select	Redlands, California
7:00 PM				Stadium: Dodge Stadium

== Competitions ==
=== USL League Two ===
==== Standings ====
Pos	Team	Pld	W	D	L	GF	GA	GD	Pts	PPG	Qualification
1	Ventura County Fusion (Q)	12	8	4	0	34	10	+24	28	2.33	Advance to USL League Two Playoffs
2	FC Tucson (Q)	12	6	4	2	19	11	+8	22	1.83	Advance to USL League Two Playoffs
3	Redlands FC	12	6	4	2	25	14	+11	22	1.83	
4	Capo FC	12	5	3	4	28	27	+1	18	1.50	
5	Stars FC	12	4	4	4	22	22	0	16	1.33	

Updated to match(es) played on July 11, 2026. Source: USL
(Q) Qualified for the phase indicated

==== Match results ====
May 23, 2026 1	FC Tucson	1–0	Redlands FC	Tucson, Arizona
7:00 PM	Ware 13'; Belmudes (yellow card) 60'; Pozos Bueno (yellow card) 84'	Report	Kawamura (yellow card) 68'	Stadium: Kino Sports Complex

May 24, 2026 2	Stars FC	1–1	Redlands FC	Surprise, Arizona
7:30 PM	Fall 45'; Lawrence (yellow card) 34'; Harris (yellow card) 45'; Brown (yellow card) 63'; Asaije (yellow card) 81'	Report	Dominguez 90'	Stadium: Ottawa University

May 30, 2026 3	Redlands FC	3–1	City SC	Redlands, California
7:00 PM	De La Torre 15'; Dominguez 25'; Badger 90'; Brown (yellow card) 56'; Naef (yellow card) 86'	Report	Takara 78'; Koptieff (yellow card) 29'; Quanbeck (yellow card) 40'	Stadium: Dodge Stadium

June 3, 2026 4	Capo FC	3–4	Redlands FC	Irvine, California
4:30 PM	Smuck 6', 8'; Kunimura 15'; Linas (yellow card) 23'; Powell (yellow card) 90'	Report	De La Torre 45'; Dominguez 57', (yellow card) 27'; Garcia 85'; Calderon 88'; Gutierrez (yellow card) 35'; Kawamura (yellow card) 70'	Stadium: Irvine Valley College

June 5, 2026 5	Redlands FC	2–1	AMSG FC	Redlands, California
7:00 PM	Garcia 34'; De La Torre 65'; Radonjic (yellow card) 68'	Report	Lyons 17'; Moreno (yellow card) 44'; Bengard (yellow card) 87'	Stadium: Dodge Stadium

June 10, 2026 6	Ventura County Fusion	0–0	Redlands FC	Ventura, California
7:00 PM	Merritt (yellow card) 29'; Torres (yellow card) 39'	Report	De La Torre (yellow card) 26'	Stadium: Ventura College

June 17, 2026 7	Southern California Eagles	2–3	Redlands FC	Whittier, California
7:00 PM	Wessels 17'; Walker 43', (yellow card) 61'; Sacristan (yellow card) 41'; Hermosillo (yellow card) 61'; Paul (yellow card) 83'	Report	De La Torre 10'; Dominguez 25', (yellow card) 65'; Meza 62'; Brown (yellow card) 78'; Lee (yellow card) 85'	Stadium: Whittier College

June 20, 2026 8	Redlands FC	5–1	Southern California Eagles	Redlands, California
7:00 PM	Radonjic 7', 43'; De La Torre 44', (yellow card) 73'; Lee 82'; Ponting 85'; Lopez (yellow card) 30'	Report	Bester 87'	Stadium: Dodge Stadium

June 27, 2026 9	Redlands FC	1–1	Stars FC	Redlands, California
7:00 PM	Dominguez 77'; Richter (yellow card) 13' (yellow-red card) 73'; Lee (yellow card) 53'; Ponting (yellow card) 76'	Report	Fall 11'; Carroll (yellow card) 76'; Severino (yellow card) 90'; Cortez (yellow card) 90'	Stadium: Dodge Stadium

July 2, 2026 10	Redlands FC	2–3	Capo FC	Redlands, California
7:00 PM	Dominguez 23'; Mcfarlane 29'; D. Gutierrez (yellow card) 65'; L. Gutierrez (yellow card) 89'; Brown (yellow card) 87'	Report	Ramirez 34'; Ruiz 45' 83'; Eagleston (yellow card) 8' (yellow-red card) 90'; Linas (yellow card) 68'	Stadium: Dodge Stadium

July 5, 2026 11	City SC	0–3	Redlands FC	Carlsbad, California
6:00 PM		Report	Ponting 50'; Garcia 53'; De La Torre 59'; Gutierrez (yellow card) 40'; Mcfarlane (yellow card) 81'	Stadium: La Costa Canyon High School

July 11, 2026 12	Redlands FC	1–1	Ventura County Fusion	Redlands, California
7:00 PM	Meza 53'; De La Torre (yellow card) 10'; Dominguez (red card)	Report	Concepcion 30', (yellow card) 90'	Stadium: Dodge Stadium
