= Little Rock Rangers =

American professional soccer club based in Little Rock

Little Rock Rangers SC
- Full name: Little Rock Rangers Soccer Club
- Nickname: The Stags
- Founded: 2016; 10 years ago
- Stadium: War Memorial Stadium; Little Rock, Arkansas
- Capacity: 54,120
- Owner: Jonathan Wardlaw
- League: USL League Two; Women's Premier Soccer League
- Website: littlerockrangers.com
Home colors	Away colors

The Little Rock Rangers Soccer Club is an American soccer team based in Little Rock, Arkansas. The team was founded in 2016 and played its inaugural season in 2016. The team plays in the USL League Two, a national semi-professional league at the fourth tier of the American Soccer Pyramid. In 2016, the club added a team for the Women's Premier Soccer League (WPSL), a league at the second tier of women's soccer in the United States soccer pyramid, playing their inaugural season in 2017. The team plays its home games at War Memorial Stadium in Little Rock.

== History ==
The Little Rock Rangers were accepted to play in the National Premier Soccer League (NPSL) in 2015 and in 2016 the Women's Premier Soccer League (WPSL). In 2018, the Rangers had a 7–3 season and qualified for the 2019 Open Cup, "the nation’s oldest and most prestigious tournament. They qualified for the US Open cup again in 2025 and 2026 after winning the division title each year. In 2025, the Rangers upset USL Championship club Birmingham Legion 1-0, before being knocked out in the second round by USL 1 side FC Naples. In 2026 they fell in the first round 4-2 to Tulsa FC of the USL Championship." The Rangers moved up to USL League Two in 2021. The team is mostly made up of high school and college-aged players, therefore the team is entirely amateur in order to preserve the college players' NCAA eligibility. The Little Rock Rangers Soccer Club is a 501(c)3 non-profit corporation and has a goal of improving soccer in the greater central Arkansas area by bringing in top-quality players and coaches. The Little Rock Rangers Academy, run by the club, provides opportunities for children 1 to 18 to develop their soccer skills with coaching from the first team staff and players. The club also has a goal of being able to provide local soccer club scholarships to underprivileged but motivated children in the area. It does this through extra revenue from ticket sales and donations received.

== Colors and badge ==
The deer and pine tree is a representation of all that is natural in the state of Arkansas. The white tail deer is the Arkansas state mammal and the loblolly pine is the state tree. The number "16" represents the year that the club started playing in the NPSL and it also represents the sixteen founders of the Little Rock Rangers Soccer Club.

== Stadium ==
Home matches are held at War Memorial Stadium, a multi-purpose stadium in Little Rock. Built in 1948, the stadium is home to the Arkansas Baptist Buffaloes, Catholic High School Rockets, and on occasion the University of Arkansas Razorbacks. The stadium also hosts the Delta Classic and Arkansas Activities Association high school championship games. The facility has undergone numerous renovations and features a FieldTurf playing surface and a capacity of 54,120.

On July 23, 2023, a new attendance record of 7,723 for the club at War Memorial Stadium was set as the Rangers defeated their Mid-South Division rivals, Texas United, 2-0 to advance to the Southern Conference Finals.

== Players ==
As of March 18, 2026

USL LEAGUE 2

Note: Flags indicate national team as defined under FIFA eligibility rules; some limited exceptions apply. Players may hold more than one non-FIFA nationality.

No.	Pos.	Nation	Player
1	GK	USA	Javier Piedra
3	MF	ENG	Archie Woodall
4	DF	USA	Andrew Hollenbach
5	DF	FRA	Joackim Betina
6	MF	ZIM	Nyasha Dube
7	MF	DOM	Antonio Natalucci
11	FW	ESP	Jon Koka
12	DF	USA	Fabrizio Cubeddu
15	MF	MEX	Carlos Beltrán

No.	Pos.	Nation	Player
16	MF	USA	Jesus Nava
17	MF	BRA	Raphael Kistmann
19	FW	GHA	Miachael Acquah
20	FW	USA	Aiden Turner
24	MF	USA	William Hankins
27	GK	POL	Tomasz Wróblewski
33	MF	NIR	Caoimhín McConnell
43	MF	USA	Evan Cristler
47	MF	ENG	Osagie Omoregie

== Staff ==
Coaching Staff

- Men's Associate Head Coach/Recruiting Coordinator - Dylan Perdue
- Men's Assistant Coach - Tyler Maynard
- Men's Assistant Coach - Ethan Garvey
- Men's Goalkeeper Coach/Recruiting Coordinator - Tomasz Wroblewski
- Men's Video Analyst - Gabriel Braghetto Otero

Business Staff

- President/General Manager- Jonathan Wardlaw
- Vice President of Operations- Jason Rector
- Technical Director - Ante Jazic
- Director of Media and Communication - Trent Eskola

== Season-By-Season ==
=== Results ===
==== Men's ====
2016 NPSL Season
Date	Opponent	Result	Venue	Event
2016-07-02	Dallas City FC	W (2–0)	Roffino Stadium	NPSL Conference Match
2016-06-26	Liverpool Warriors	W (2–0)	Rough Rider Stadium	NPSL Conference Match
2016-06-24	Fort Worth Vaqueros FC	W (4–3)	Martin Field	NPSL Conference Match
2016-06-22	Corinthians FC of San Antonio	W 3–2)	Alamo Stadium	NPSL Conference Match
2016-06-12	Tulsa Athletic	L (0–1)	War Memorial Stadium	NPSL Conference Match
2016-06-10	Shreveport Rafters FC	D (1–1)	War Memorial Stadium	NPSL Conference Match
2016-06-03	Joplin Demize	W (1–0)	War Memorial Stadium	NPSL Conference Match
2016-05-28	Dutch Lions FC	L (1–4)	War Memorial Stadium	NPSL Conference Match
2016-05-21	Joplin Demize	L (1–2)	Hershewe Soccer Complex	NPSL Conference Match
2016-05-15	Houston Regals	L (0–1)	War Memorial Stadium	NPSL Conference Match
2016-05-11	Tulsa Athletic	L (0–1)	Athletics Stadium	NPSL Conference Match
2016-05-06	FC Wichita	L (0–2)	War Memorial Stadium	NPSL Conference Match
2016-05-01	Shreveport Rafters FC	L (1–3)	Lee Hedges Stadium	Friendly
2016-04-24	Memphis City FC	D (3–3)	Mike Rose Soccer Complex	I-40 Cup/Friendly
2016-04-22	Memphis City FC	W (2–1)	War Memorial Stadium	I-40 Cup/Friendly

2017 NPSL Season
Date	Opponent	Result	Venue	Event
2017-07-08	Tulsa Athletic	L (3–2)	LaFortune Stadium	NPSL Conference Match
2017-07-01	Ozark FC	L (2–1)	War Memorial Stadium	NPSL Conference Match
2017-06-24	Ozark FC	W (3–1)	John Brown University Soccer Stadium	NPSL Conference Match
2017-06-17	FC Wichita	W (1–0)	War Memorial Stadium	NPSL Conference Match
2017-06-10	Tulsa Athletic	D (1–1)	War Memorial Stadium	NPSL Conference Match
2017-06-01	Demize NPSL	D (1–1)	Lake Country Soccer Cooper Stadium	NPSL Conference Match
2017-05-26	Dallas City FC	W (2–1)	War Memorial Stadium	NPSL Conference Match
2017-05-20	Demize NPSL	W (2–1)	War Memorial Stadium	NPSL Conference Match
2017-05-13	FC Wichita	D (2–2)	Stryker Soccer Complex	NPSL Conference Match
2017-05-06	Dallas City FC	D (2–2)	McInnish Sports Complex	NPSL Conference Match
2017-04-30	Memphis City FC	L (2–1)	War Memorial Stadium	I-40 Cup/Friendly
2017-04-28	Memphis City FC	D (1–1)	Mike Rose Soccer Complex	I-40 Cup/Friendly
2017-04-22	Shreveport Rafters FC	L (2–1)	Lee Hedges Stadium	Friendly
2017-04-14	Shreveport Rafters FC	W (1–0)	War Memorial Stadium	Friendly
2017-03-25	BOCA Knights FC	D (1–1)	War Memorial Stadium	Friendly

2018 NPSL Season
Date	Opponent	Result	Venue	Event
2018-04-21	Rafters FC	L (2–1)	War Memorial Stadium	Friendly
2018-05-10	Rafters FC	L (3–1)	Independence Bowl	Friendly
2018-05-10	OKC 1889	D (1–1)	War Memorial Stadium	Friendly
2018-05-13	OKC 1889	W (1–0)	Norman North High School	Friendly
2018-05-06	Tulsa Athletic	L (6–1)	Veteran's Park	NPSL Conference Match
2018-05-19	FC Wichita	L (2–1)	Trinity Academy	NPSL Conference Match
2018-05-26	STL Club Atletico	W (3–1)	St. Mary's High School	NPSL Conference Match
2018-06-01	Demize NPSL	W (4–3)	Branson High School	NPSL Conference Match
2018-06-09	STL Club Atletico	L (3–2)	War Memorial Stadium	NPSL Conference Match
2018-06-16	Ozark FC	W (2–1)	War Memorial Stadium	NPSL Conference Match
2018-06-21	Demize NPSL	W (1–0)	War Memorial Stadium	NPSL Conference Match
2018-06-23	Ozark FC	W (1–0)	Veteran's Park	NPSL Conference Match
2018-06-30	FC Wichita	W (1–0)	War Memorial Stadium	NPSL Conference Match
2018-07-07	Tulsa Athletic	W (2–0)	War Memorial Stadium	NPSL Conference Match
2018-07-11	Tulsa Athletic	W (1–0)	War Memorial Stadium	NPSL Conference Semifinals
2018-07-14	FC Wichita	W (0–0,5–3)	Trinity Academy	NPSL Conference Finals
2018-07-17	Laredo Heat	W (2–1	Texas A&M University Soccer Complex	NPSL Region Semifinals
2018-07-21	Miami FC 2	L (3–0)	St. Thomas University	NPSL Region Finals

2023 USL League Two Season
Date	Opponent	Result	Venue	Event
2023-05-10	AR Wolves	D (2–2)	War Memorial Stadium	Friendly
2023-05-13	Blue Goose SC	W (7–0)	War Memorial Stadium	Mid-South Division
2023-05-20	LA Krewe	W (1–0)	Clark Field	Mid-South Division
2023-05-27	Blue Goose SC	W (5–1)	Airline High School	Mid-South Division
2023-05-31	Texas United	L (0–1)	John Clark Stadium	Mid-South Division
2023-06-07	Texas United	D (1–1)	War Memorial Stadium	Mid-South Division
2023-06-14	LA Parish	W (1–0)	War Memorial Stadium	Mid-South Division
2023-06-17	Mississippi Brilla	W (4–0)	Clinton High School	Mid-South Division
2023-06-24	Mississippi Brilla	W (6–1)	War Memorial Stadium	Mid-South Division
2023-06-28	LA Parish	W (5–0)	LSU Soccer Stadium	Mid-South Division
2023-07-01	Blue Goose SC	W (10–0)	War Memorial Stadium	Mid-South Division
2023-07-08	Mississippi Brilla	D (2–2)	Clinton High School	Mid-South Division
2023-07-12	LA Krewe	L (0–1)	War Memorial Stadium	Mid-South Division
2023-07-21	Houston Albion	W (2–0)	War Memorial Stadium	USL League Two Playoffs
2023-07-23	Texas United	W (2–0)	War Memorial Stadium	USL League Two Playoffs
2023-07-28	The Villages SC	L (1–1,5–3)	TowneBank Stadium	USL League Two Southern Conference Final

2024 USL League Two Season
Date	Opponent	Result	Venue	Event
2024-05-04	Inter-squad Match	W (2–1)	War Memorial Stadium	Friendly
2024-05-08	RVSC Bully's	W (5–0)	War Memorial Stadium	Friendly
2024-05-11	Hattiesburg FC	W (1–0)	War Memorial Stadium	Mid-South Division
2024-05-18	LA Krewe	D (0–0)	Lafayette Christian Academy	Mid-South Division
2024-05-25	Mississippi Brilla	W (2–0)	Arrow Stadium	Mid-South Division
2024-06-01	Mississippi Brilla	W (2-0)	War Memorial Stadium	Mid-South Division
2024-06-5	Blue Goose SC	W (2-0)	War Memorial Stadium	Mid-South Division
2024-06-8	Hattiesburg FC	W (1-0)	War Memorial Stadium	Mid-South Division
2024-06-15	LA Krewe	D (1-1)	Lafayette Christian Academy	Mid-South Division
2024-06-19	Blue Goose SC	W (3-0)	Airline Stadium	Mid-South Division
2024-06-29	Blue Goose SC	W (5-0)	Airline Stadium	Mid-South Division
2024-07-06	LA Krewe	W (1-0)	War Memorial Stadium	Mid-South Division
2024-07-10	Mississippi Brilla	W (2-1)	War Memorial Stadium	Mid-South Division
2024-07-13	Hattiesburg FC		Tatum Park	Mid-South Division

==== Women's ====
2017 WPSL Season
Date	Opponent	Result	Venue	Event
2017-06-30	Chattanooga FC		War Memorial Stadium	WPSL Conference Match
2017-06-25	Inter Nashville FC		International Indoor Soccer Complex	WPSL Conference Match
2017-06-17	Gulf Coast Texans		War Memorial Stadium	WPSL Conference Match
2017-06-11	Knoxville Force		War Memorial Stadium	WPSL Conference Match
2017-06-07	Alabama United FC		Rathmell Sports Complex	WPSL Conference Match
2017-06-04	Knoxville Force		Sansom Sports Complex	WPSL Conference Match
2017-05-27	Memphis Lobos		Houston High School	WPSL Conference Match
2017-05-25	Memphis Lobos		War Memorial Stadium	WPSL Conference Match

2018 WPSL Season
Date	Opponent	Result	Venue	Event
2018-05-13	Memphis Lobos	L (4–1)	Houston Middle School	Friendly
2018-05-16	Memphis Lobos	D (0–0)	War Memorial Stadium	Friendly
2018-06-01	Lady Demize	W (2–1)	Branson High School	Friendly
2018-06-21	Lady Demize	W (6–0)	War Memorial Stadium	Friendly
2018-05-19	FC Wichita	L (7–1)	Trinity Academy	WPSL Conference Match
2018-05-27	OK City FC	L (1–0)	Mid America Christian University	WPSL Conference Match
2018-05-30	FC Dallas	L (10–1)	Dr. Pink Stadium	WPSL Conference Match
2018-06-03	Texas Spurs	L (5–1)	Lucas, TX	WPSL Conference Match
2018-06-09	Texas Spurs	L (4–1)	War Memorial Stadium	WPSL Conference Match
2018-06-15	Fortuna Tulsa	L (6–0)	University of Tulsa	WPSL Conference Match
2018-06-17	FC Dallas	L (4–1)	War Memorial Stadium	WPSL Conference Match
2018-06-28	Fortuna Tulsa	D (0–0)	War Memorial Stadium	WPSL Conference Match
2018-06-30	FC Wichita	D (1–1)	War Memorial Stadium	WPSL Conference Match
2018-07-07	OK City FC	L (6–0)	War Memorial Stadium	NPSL Conference Match

=== Record ===
==== Men's ====
Year	Division	League	Region	Conference	Friendlies	Regular season	Playoffs
2016	4	NPSL	South	South Central	1–1–1	7th, 5–6–1	N/A
2017	4	NPSL	South	Heartland	1–0–1	3rd, 4–2–4	Heartland Conference Semifinalists
2018	4	NPSL	South	Heartland	1–2–1	1st, 7–3–0	South Region Finalists
2019	4	NPSL	South	Heartland	2–1–0	2nd, 4–1–5	Heartland Conference Semifinalists

Year	League	Conference	Division	Friendlies	Regular season	Playoffs
2021	USL2	Central	Mid-South	0–1–0	5th, 6–7–1	N/A
2022	USL2	Southern	Mid-South	1–0–0	4th, 4–5–4	N/A
2023	USL2	Southern	Mid-South	1–1–0	2nd, 8–2–2	Southern Conference Finalist
2024	USL2	Southern	Mid-South		1st, 9–3–0	Conference Semifinals
2025	USL2	Southern	Mid-South		1st, 8–3–1	Conference Quarterfinals
2026	USL2	Southern	Mid-South		1st, 10–2–0	Conference Quarterfinals

==== Women's ====
Year	Division	League	Region	Conference	Friendlies	Regular season	Playoffs
2017	2	WPSL	South	Southeast	0-0-0	1st, 0-0-0	TBD
2018	2	WPSL	South	Southwest	2–1–1	6th, 0–8–2	N/A
