= Dominique Robertson =

American football player (born 1994)

Profile
- Position: Offensive guard

Personal information
- Born: Riverside, California
- Listed height: 6 ft 5 in (1.96 m)
- Listed weight: 330 lb (150 kg)

Career information
- High school: Redlands
- College: West Georgia
- NFL draft: 2016: undrafted

Career history
- Tampa Bay Buccaneers (2016)

Dominique Robertson (born July 21, 1994) is an American football offensive guard. He played college football for West Georgia. He was undrafted in the 2016 NFL draft.

== Shooting incident ==
On July 3, 2016, Robertson was hospitalized for two gunshot wounds in his leg while attempting to rob a drug dispensary with help from ex ucla running back Craig lee .
