= Natalucci =

Natalucci is an Italian surname. Notable people with the surname include:

- Antonio Natalucci (born 2000), Dominican footballer of Italian origin
- Durastante Natalucci (1687–1772), Italian historian
