= Donna L. Crisp =

American military officer

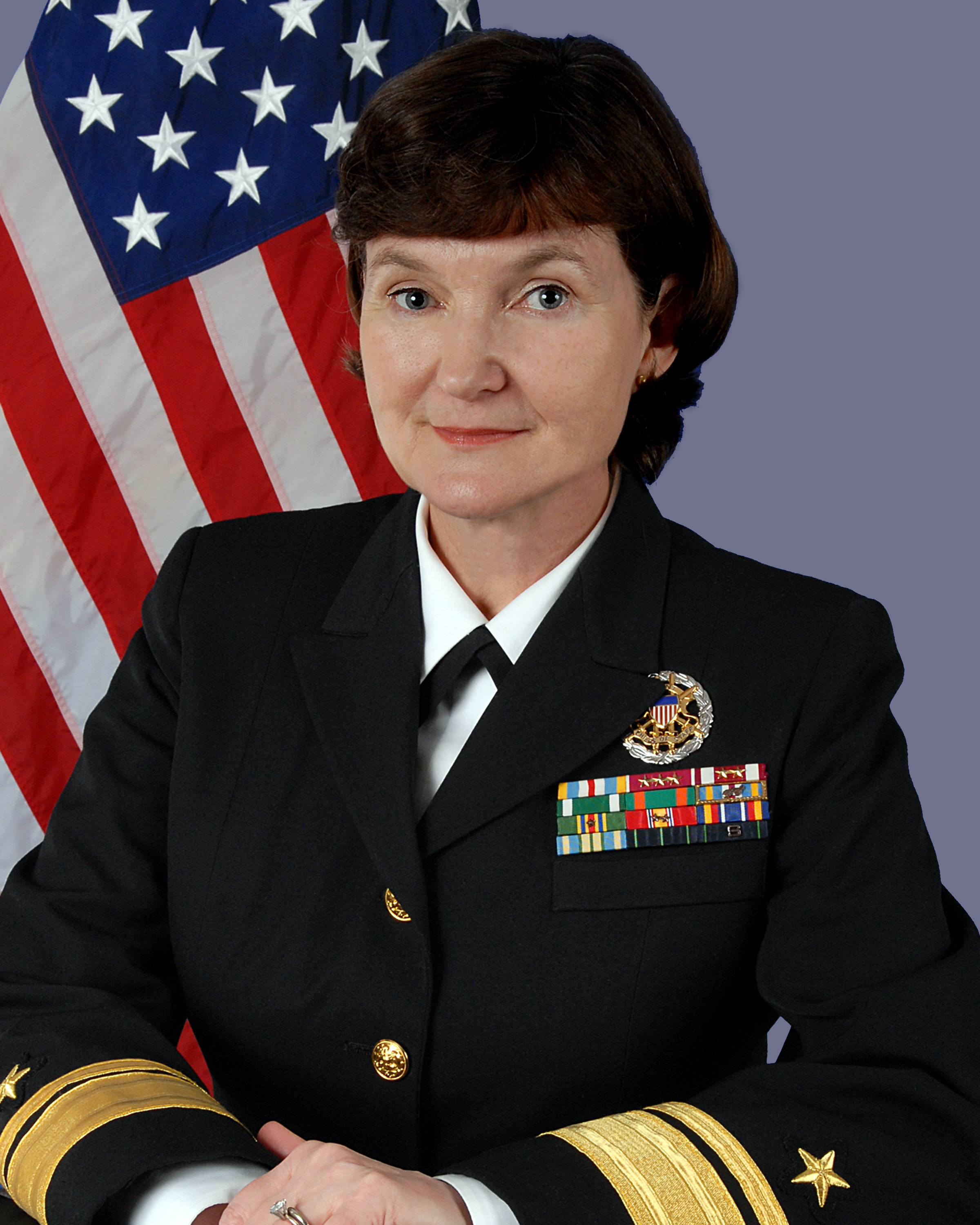
- Crisp in 2006
- Born: Donna Lynn Chesus; 1949 (age 76–77); Bay Shore, New York, U.S.
- Education: California State University, Long Beach; National War College
- Military career
- Allegiance: United States
- Branch: United States Navy
- Rank: Rear Admiral
- Commands: Joint POW/MIA Accounting Command
- Conflicts: Operation Enduring Freedom; Operation Iraqi Freedom
- Awards: Defense Superior Service Medal; Legion of Merit; Meritorious Service Medal; Navy Commendation Medal; Navy Achievement Medal

Donna Lynn Chesus Crisp (born 1949) is an American retired military officer. She served in the United States Navy for over thirty years, achieving the rank of two-star rear admiral. Crisp was director of manpower and personnel readiness for the Joint Chiefs of Staff chairman in Washington, D.C. during Operation Enduring Freedom and Operation Iraqi Freedom. In 2008, she assumed the position of commander of the Joint Prisoner of War/Missing in Action Accounting Command.

== Early life and education ==
Crisp was born in Bay Shore, New York in 1949. Her father, Frank O. Chesus, was a scientist and engineer who served in the United States Army. She grew up in Redlands, California and attended Redlands High School. She graduated from California State University, Long Beach with a Bachelor of Arts degree and studied strategic studies at the National War College.

== Naval career ==
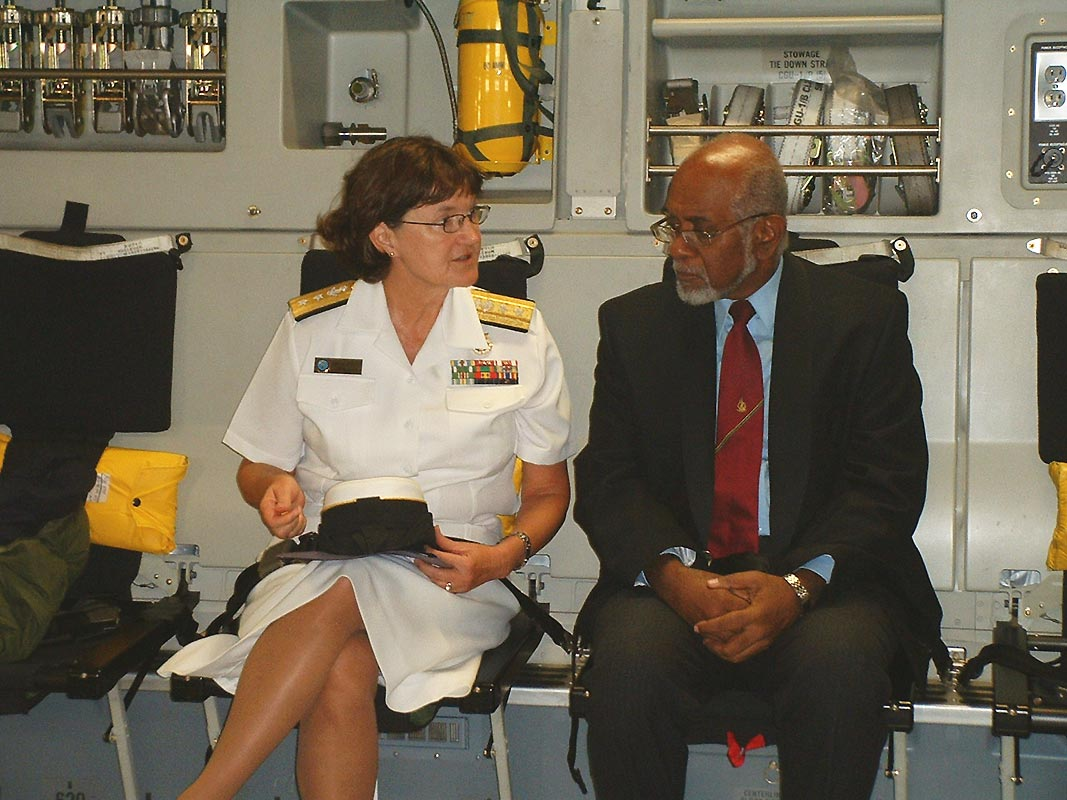
Crisp and President Mataskelekele of the Republic of Vanuatu

In 1974, Crisp was commissioned an ensign at Officer Candidate School in Newport, RI. Her early career included positions at Naval District of Washington as protocol officer and public affairs officer; security, communications, and public affairs positions at Pearl Harbor, HI; manpower and personnel department head in the 3rd Fleet; weapons control and air traffic control program project officer at Fleet Combat Direction Systems Support Activity in San Diego, California.

She was promoted to rear admiral in 2001. After that, Crisp was director of manpower and personnel readiness for the Joint Chiefs of Staff chairman in Washington, D.C. during Operation Enduring Freedom and Operation Iraqi Freedom. Between 2002 and 2004, she was stationed in Oahu with the Navy's Pacific Fleet. In January 2008, she assumed the position of commander of the Joint Prisoner of War/Missing in Action Accounting Command (JPAC). In that role she represented U.S. government in POW/MIA negotiations with foreign governments and testified before the U.S. Congress. Two videos of her testimonies in 2008 and 2009 are available on the C-SPAN network. The mission of JPAC was to fully account for U.S. servicemembers who were lost during previous conflicts.

== Other activities ==
Crisp is a member of the Daughters of the American Revolution and served as regent of the Great Bridge Chapter DAR from 2016 to 2019. She serves as the DAR's national vice-chair of the Commemorative Events Committee, focusing on the World War I Centennial/Treaty of Versailles. Crisp is also serving as the National Vice Chair of Vivian's Outreach to Women a new program which supports indigent and homeless women that launched June 2019.

== Awards ==
Crisp has received various military awards, including:

- Secretary of Defense Reengineering Excellence award
- Defense Superior Service Medal with one oak leaf cluster
- Legion of Merit with three gold stars
- Meritorious Service Medal with two gold stars
- Navy Commendation Medal
- Navy Achievement Medal
