= Redlands FC =

American soccer club

- Full name: Redlands Football Club
- Founded: 2022; 4 years ago
- Stadium: Dodge Stadium; Redlands, California
- Capacity: 6,000
- Chairman: Ryan Whiley
- Manager: Cody Carlson
- League: USL League Two
- 2026: 3rd, Southwest Division; Playoffs: Did not qualify
- Website: redlandsfootballclub.com
Home colors	Away colors	Third colors

The Redlands Football Club is a semi-professional American soccer team based in Redlands, California. Founded in July 2022, the team plays in USL League Two, the fourth tier of the American Soccer Pyramid.

The team plays its home games at Dodge Stadium, on the campus of Redlands High School. The team was founded by locals Travis Spalding, Rajat Khare, Christopher Driscoll, and Ryan Whiley.

== History ==
Redlands FC inaugural match was against FC Tucson on May 13, 2023 at Dodge Stadium. The team managed to get a draw, with Redlands FC only goal being scored by Omar Yehya. The team had a successful season in their 2023 southwest division However, playing 12 matches, they had won 8, Drew 2, lost 2, scored 22 goals, and conceded 13 goals. The team had finished in 1st and went to the USL League Two Playoffs. On July 21, 2023, Redlands FC faced San Francisco Glens SC, where they had lost 1-2.

== Colors and crest ==
Redlands FC’s home colors are Cream and Red. Whilst its away colors are Maroon, Red, and Yellow.

Season	Manufacture	Shirt Sponsor (chest)	Shirt Sponsor (back)	Shirt Sponsor (sleeve)
2023	Hummel	La Volata		State Street Optometry
2024	Hummel	La Volata	University of Redlands	State Street Optometry
2025	Inaria	Harsh Law	La Volata	State Street Optometry
2026	Inaria	Harsh Law	Stater Bros.	IEOMFS

== Players and staff ==
=== Roster ===
As of July 13, 2026

Note: Flags indicate national team as defined under FIFA eligibility rules; some limited exceptions apply. Players may hold more than one non-FIFA nationality.

No.	Pos.	Nation	Player
0	GK	USA	Keegan O'Brien
1	GK	USA	Tony Flores
2	DF	USA	Abraham Brown
3	DF	USA	Julian Borja
4	DF	USA	Darwin Lopez
5	DF	USA	Matti Richter
6	MF	USA	Daniel Gutierrez ("Tati")
7	MF	DEN	Philip Naef
8	MF	USA	Jose Garcia ("Chicha")
9	FW	USA	Wyatt Ponting
10	MF	USA	Jose De La Torre
11	MF	USA	Efren Nunez Dominguez
12	FW	USA	Marcus Lee
13	DF	USA	Kristian Johnson
14	FW	USA	Diego Lopez-Rosales
15	DF	GER	Mika Kosch
17	FW	USA	Mason Ward
18	MF	USA	Kevin Meza
19	MF	USA	Jonah Kawamura
20	FW	MNE	Andrija Radonjic
21	FW	GHA	Clement Badger
22	DF	USA	Lantz Gutierrez
23	DF	USA	Mason Moreno
24	DF	USA	Adrian Diaz
29	DF	USA	Liam Mcfarlane
30	MF	USA	Juan Calderon
34	GK	USA	Tait Whittemore

=== Coaching staff ===
As of April 24, 2026

Coaching Staff
Head coach	Cody Carlson
Assistant coach	Edwin Diaz
Goalkeeping coach	Andy Gutierrez
Team Manager	Ryan Talbert

== Year by year ==
Season	League									Position	Playoffs	USOC	Average attendance	Top goalscorer(s)	
Season	Pld	W	L	D	GF	GA	GD	Pts	PPG	Div.	Playoffs	USOC	Average attendance	Player(s)	Goals
2023	12	8	2	2	22	13	+9	26	2.17	1st, Southwest	Conference Quarterfinals	DNQ	~1900	Omar Yehya	5
2024	14	6	4	4	38	28	+10	22	1.57	4th, Southwest	DNQ	1st Round	~1900	Luka Lukic	8
2025	12	6	3	3	40	19	+21	21	1.75	5th, Southwest	DNQ	DNQ	~1900	5 players^{[a]}	5
2026	12	6	2	4	25	14	+11	22	1.83	3rd, Southwest	DNQ	DNQ	~1900	2 players^{[b]}	6

== Club culture ==
=== Supporters ===
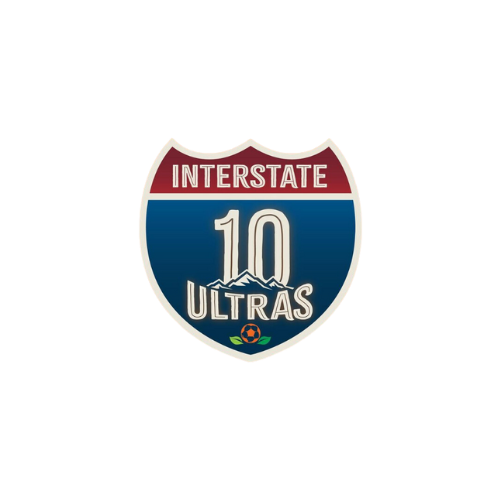
I-10 Ultras logo.

The primary supporters group for Redlands FC is the I-10 Ultras. They were founded April 2023 prior to the 2023 USL 2 season.

== Honors ==
- USL League Two Southwest Division
  - Champions (1): 2023

== Notes ==
^{a} Leading scorers were Luka Lukic, Javier Hernandez, Troy Elgersma, Wyatt Ponting, and Sam Addo.
^{b} Leading scorers were Jose De La Torre and Efren Nunez Dominguez
