= Jim Weatherwax =

American football player (born 1943)

No. 73
- Position: Defensive tackle

Personal information
- Born: January 9, 1943 (age 83); Porterville, California, U.S.
- Listed height: 6 ft 7 in (2.01 m)
- Listed weight: 260 lb (118 kg)

Career information
- High school: Redlands (Redlands, California)
- College: San Bernardino Valley College; West Texas A&M; Cal State LA (1964-1965)
- NFL draft: 1965: 11th round, 150th overall pick
- AFL draft: 1965: Red Shirt 5th round, 38th overall pick

Career history
- Green Bay Packers (1966–1969); St. Louis Cardinals (1970)*
- * Offseason or practice squad member only

Awards and highlights
- 2× Super Bowl champion (I, II); 2× NFL champion (1966, 1967); All-CCAA (1965)

Career NFL statistics
- Fumble recoveries: 1
- Sacks: 2.5
- Stats at Pro Football Reference

James Michael Weatherwax (born January 9, 1943) is an American former professional football player who was a defensive tackle for the Green Bay Packers of the National Football League (NFL). He played college football at San Bernardino Valley College, California State University, Los Angeles and West Texas A&M University.

== Early life ==
James Michael Weatherwax was born 9 Jan 1943, in Tulare County, California. He was the son William G. and Oletta (Stewart) Weatherwax. He was a graduate of Van Nuys High School in Van Nuys, California. Weatherwax played basketball under Jerry Tarkanian at Redlands High School and also played football. A two-way player, Weatherwax was named to the San Bernardino County all-star team in 1960. He grew ten inches between his sophomore and senior years. In college, Weatherwax started at the two-year San Bernardino Valley College and later stopped at West Texas A&M University and Cal State-Los Angeles.

== Football career ==
Weatherwax was selected in the 11th round (150th overall) of the 1966 NFL draft by the Green Bay Packers. He was also drafted by the San Diego Chargers in that year's American Football League draft. Weatherwax chose Green Bay for its recent success, claiming that it wasn't much of a choice to make. During his sophomore season in 1967, Weatherwax broke the starting lineup for three games after injuries to the two players above him on the depth chart, Lionel Aldridge and Bob Brown. Weatherwax played through broken ribs in the 1967 season at the behest of coach Vince Lombardi. He played in both Super Bowl I and Super Bowl II as a reserve. Weatherwax saw playing time on the defensive line and on special teams. He did not play in 1968 after having knee surgery in September; he returned to practice the following July.

After the 1969 season, Weatherwax was out of the NFL due to knee injuries. Green Bay waived him on September 3, 1970 and the St. Louis Cardinals conditionally picked Weatherwax up, although he failed a physical and the team declined to sign him.

== After football ==
Weatherwax postponed his wedding, initially scheduled for December 1966, due to the Packers deep playoff run that season. After his football career was over, Weatherwax worked as a manager and was part owner of a Marie Callendar's restaurant in El Toro, California. Weatherwax moved to Loveland, Colorado, and became an avid bass fisherman.
