= Nyasha Dube =

Zimbabwean footballer (born 1997)

Personal information
- Full name: Nyasha Michael Dube
- Date of birth: 14 December 1997 (age 28)
- Place of birth: Norton, Zimbabwe

Team information
- Current team: Little Rock Rangers

College career
Years	Team	Apps	(Gls)
2017	Northeastern State RiverHawks	17	(2)
2018–2021	Central Baptist Mustangs	28+	(4+)

Senior career*
Years	Team	Apps	(Gls)
2019–	Little Rock Rangers	8+	(0+)

International career
2021–	Zimbabwe	1	(0)
- * Club domestic league appearances and goals

Nyasha Michael Dube (born 14 December 1997) is a Zimbabwean footballer who plays as a midfielder for Little Rock Rangers. Nyasha was born in the town of Hwange in Zimbabwe. He started playing for Hwange FC under 14 in 2010 and he later got promoted to the Under 17 team until 2015. He then signed with the Under 20 team that played in the ZIFA Southern Region Division 1. After rejecting a first team contract with Hwange, he moved to the United States Of America on a football scholarship. Nyasha attended a tryout and out of about 150 players that attended the trials, he was the only chosen. After spending a year at Northeastern University, he moved to Central Baptist College where he obtained his bachelor's degree in business. Upon leaving Rangers at the end of the 2021 season, he signed with ambitious NPSL side Arkansas Wolves for the 2022/23 season.

== Career ==
In 2017, Dube joined the Northeastern State RiverHawks in the United States. In 2019, he signed for American side Little Rock Rangers.
