= Antonio Natalucci =

Italian–Dominican Republic footballer (born 2000)

Personal information
- Full name: Antonio Natalucci Berroa
- Date of birth: 1 August 2000 (age 26)
- Place of birth: Rome, Italy
- Height: 1.82 m (6 ft 0 in)
- Position: Defender

Youth career
- Lazio
- Frosinone

Senior career*
Years	Team	Apps	(Gls)
2019–2020	Nardò	16	(0)
2020–2022	Triestina	13	(1)
2020–2021	→ Novara (loan)	8	(0)
2021	→ Cavese (loan)	12	(0)
2022	Monopoli	5	(0)
2023	Cibao	4	(0)
2023–2025	Ostia Mare	17	(3)
2025-	Little Rock Rangers		

International career
2021–2022	Dominican Republic	7	(0)
- * Club domestic league appearances and goals as of 1 July 2024

Antonio Natalucci Berroa (born 1 August 2000) is a professional footballer who plays as a defender. Born in Italy, he represents the Dominican Republic at international level.

== Club career ==
Developed in youth academies of Lazio and Frosinone, Natalucci joined Serie D club Nardò during 2019–20 season.

Natalucci joined Serie C side Triestina ahead of 2020–21 season and made his professional debut on 27 September 2020 in a 1–0 league defeat against Matelica.

On 6 October 2020, Novara announced the signing of Natalucci on a season long loan deal.

On 31 January 2022, Natalucci moved to Monopoli.

== International career ==
Natalucci was born in Italy to an Italian father and a Dominican mother. On 27 October 2020, Natalucci received maiden call-up to the Dominican Republic national team.

== Career statistics ==
=== International ===
As of match played 13 June 2022

Appearances and goals by national team and year
National team	Year	Apps	Goals
Dominican Republic	2021	3	0
Dominican Republic	2022	4	0
Total		7	0
