= Arizona Athletic Grounds =

American sports complex in Mesa, Arizona

- Interactive map of Arizona Athletic Grounds
- Location: Mesa, Arizona
- Coordinates: 33.2985°N 111.6260°W

Construction
- Opened: January 2022

Website
- azgrounds.com

Arizona Athletic Grounds (formerly Legacy Sports Park, Bell Bank Park, and Legacy Park) is a multi-purpose sports and entertainment complex in Mesa, Arizona. Located on the site of a former General Motors testing ground, the 275-acre facility opened in January 2022.

== History ==
In 2018, Mesa voters rejected a bond proposal for a nearby state-owned sports facility, clearing the way for a privately financed alternative. The project, developed by Legacy Sports, broke ground in October 2020 under the name Legacy Sports Park. In September 2021, a 10-year naming rights agreement with Bell Bank rebranded the venue as Bell Bank Park. Construction costs were reported at approximately $280 million. The facility opened to the public on January 7, 2022.

Bell Bank ended its naming rights agreement on April 14, 2023, and the venue reverted to Legacy Park. On May 1, 2023, owner Legacy Cares filed for Chapter 11 bankruptcy, reporting approximately $366.7 million in liabilities against $242.3 million in assets.

In December 2023, the property was acquired out of bankruptcy by AZ Athletic Associates LLC — a joint venture between Mike Burke and Rocky Mountain Resources — and rebranded as Arizona Athletic Grounds.

In 2025, its second full year under new ownership, Arizona Athletic Grounds reported more than 2.8 million visitors, a 16% year-over-year increase, with visitors from all 50 states. Nearly one million visits occurred in the first quarter of 2025, driven by Martin Luther King Jr. Day and Presidents' Day weekend tournaments.

== Facilities ==
The facility contains 158 fields and courts across more than 475,000 square feet of indoor fieldhouse space, supporting basketball, baseball, softball, volleyball, beach volleyball, soccer, pickleball, cheer, and dance. Outdoor venues include a 2,200-seat championship field, 24 multi-purpose fields (20 turf and four natural grass), 41 pickleball courts with a 1,800-seat shaded championship court, 12 beach volleyball courts, eight baseball and softball diamonds, and a 2.7-acre outdoor event yard. Indoor venues include 50 volleyball courts, 16 basketball courts, six futsal courts, a gymnastics center, a dance studio, a cheer gym and a sports performance center.

== Events ==
In December 2025, Arizona Athletic Grounds hosted MLS NEXT Fest, described by Major League Soccer as the largest youth soccer scouting and talent identification event in the United States. The event featured 1,474 teams from more than 250 clubs playing 2,400 matches over 12 days.

The venue hosts the annual Section 7 high school basketball recruiting tournament and the USA Basketball 3X Championships. In 2026, Arizona Athletic Grounds entered into a multi-year agreement with Triple Crown Sports to host 11 baseball tournaments through 2029, including the Arizona Spring Championships. The Professional Pickleball Association's Carvana Mesa Cup is held at the facility annually. The complex has also hosted Athletes Unlimited, the Olympic Development Program, the National Wheelchair Basketball League, Special Olympics, U.S. Youth Soccer, Nike EYBL, and the American Cornhole League.

In May 2026, Arizona Athletic Grounds was selected as the official Team Base Camp training site for the Türkiye men's national team during the 2026 FIFA World Cup. A public community welcome event was held on June 8, 2026.

== Facilities ==
The facility spans 275 acres (111 ha) and includes:

- 2,200-seat outdoor stadium
- 1,800-seat indoor stadium
- 35 soccer/lacrosse fields
- 57 indoor volleyball courts
- 8 baseball/softball fields
- 20 basketball courts
- 41 pickleball courts
- 12 beach volleyball courts
- 6 futsal courts
- Gymnastics center
- Dance studio
- Cheer center
- Sports performance center
- Food and beverage areas

=== Venue names ===
Venue name	Dates
Arizona Athletic Grounds	December 2023 – present
Legacy Park	April 2023 – December 2023
Bell Bank Park	September 2021 – April 2023
Legacy Sports Park	October 2020 – September 2021
