= AMSG FC =

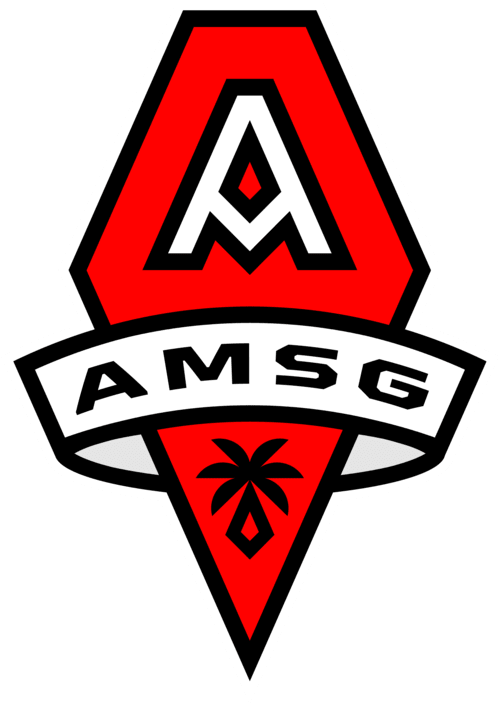
- Full name: AMSG Fútbol Club
- Founded: 2017; 9 years ago
- Stadium: Boswell Stadium; Westminster, California
- Capacity: 5,500
- President: Ismaiel Alkayali
- Manager: Ismaiel Alkayali
- League: USL League Two
- 2026: 8th of Southwest Division (no playoffs)
- Website: amsgfutbolclub.org
Home colors	Away colors

The AMSG Fútbol Club is a semi-professional American soccer club based in Huntington Beach, California. Founded in 2017, the team plays in USL League Two, the fourth tier of the American Soccer Pyramid.

The club also runs a second team, academy and women's team under the same name in the United Premier Soccer League, USL Academy, and USL W leagues, respectively.

== History ==
AMSG FC was first originally founded in 2017, and in 2019 it was refocused by club president Ismaiel Alkayali into a professional development organization. Additionally in 2020, Zach Gedal was brought onto the operations board. During his tenure, he was pivotal in the refocusing of AMSG FC. His communications and marketing expertise contributed to the club’s growth, especially during its expansion into USL League Two in 2024. His background as a former player added authenticity to his operational roles. Post-AMSG, he transitioned to Olympia Management, but his experience at the club remains a key highlight of his professional journey in soccer management.

In 2024, it was announced that AMSG FC would join the USL League Two, an amateur / semi-professional in the United Soccer League system. They were placed in the Southwest Division in the Western Conference, following the conference realignment the USL League 2 underwent during the 2024 offseason.

AMSG FC's first game was against AZ Arsenal at home on May 30, 2024, which ended in a 1–1 draw. Anthony Morales was the first goalscorer in the club's history, scoring in the 39th minute.

== Roster ==
=== Current roster ===
As of August 6, 2024

Note: Flags indicate national team as defined under FIFA eligibility rules; some limited exceptions apply. Players may hold more than one non-FIFA nationality.

No.	Pos.	Nation	Player
2	DF		Russell Munier
5	MF		Amir Zahiroleslam
6	MF		Kenneth Livernois
10	MF		Yasser Mallisho
—	DF		Finn Pock
—	DF		Anas Ghannam
—	DF		Marc Valencia
—	DF		Max Fernandez
—	FW		Lukas Ryan
—	FW		Jason Horton
—	FW		Armon Haghighat
—	FW		Kristian Horbunov
—	FW		Shaleek Joubert
—	FW		Eren Cinar
—	FW		Omer Shah

No.	Pos.	Nation	Player
—	FW		Anthony Morales
—	FW		Lucas Rosell
—	GK		Andria Fanos
—	GK		Noah Schwengeler
—	GK		Ali Younis
—	MF		Ryan Candelario
—	MF		Jaelyn Agu
—	MF		Bryon Castillo Jr.
—	MF		Nolan O'Sullivan
—	MF		Yusef Shahin
—	MF		Yasser Mallisho
—	MF		Moises Delgado
—	MF		Jordan Di Lonardo
—	MF		Eli Rico-Torres
—	MF		Nick Serrano

== Record ==
=== Men's team ===
Year	League	Conference	Regular Season	Playoffs	U.S. Open Cup
2024	USL League Two	Southwest Division	3rd	DNQ	Did not enter
2025	USL League Two	Southwest Division	6th	TBD	DNQ
2026	USL League Two	Southwest Division	8th	TBD	DNQ

=== Women's team ===
Year	League	Conference	Regular Season	Playoffs
2025	USL W League	SoCal	5th	DNQ
2026	USL W League	SoCal	5th	DNQ
