= Red River FC =

Red River
- Full name: Red River Futbol Club
- Nickname: Raiders
- Founded: 2021; 5 years ago
- Stadium: Airline High School, Bossier City, LA
- Head Coach: Adam Williams
- League: USL League Two
- Website: redriverfc.com
Home colors	Away colors

Red River Futbol Club (formerly Blue Goose SC until 2024) is an American semi-professional soccer club based in Bossier City, Louisiana. Founded in 2021, the club aims to provide localized talent in the Northern Louisiana area a platform for competitive play. Since 2022, the club has been performing in the Mid South division of the USL League Two. The team plays its home games at Airline High School.

In 2024, Red River FC appointed Bryan Turner as a first-year USL Head Coach.

== Players ==
As of February 28, 2024

Note: Flags indicate national team as defined under FIFA eligibility rules; some limited exceptions apply. Players may hold more than one non-FIFA nationality.

No.	Pos.	Nation	Player
—	GK	USA	Cole Edwards
—	MF	RSA	Tererai Chawirah
—	MF	ENG	Mackenzie Crerie
—	MF	USA	Ian Ebarb
—	FW	USA	Marcus Gibson
—	MF	USA	Hector Hernandez
—	FW	USA	Maximus Holt
—	DF	USA	Oliver Jiminez Sanchez
—	FW	GER	Julius Kruger
—	DF	CAN	Chris-Gradi Mubiayi-Kalambayi
—	FW	USA	Bruno Palmieri

No.	Pos.	Nation	Player
—	FW	USA	Gerardo Perez
—	FW	USA	David Rojas
—	MF	USA	Nicholas Sepulvado
—	FW	USA	Brasen Teutsch
—	FW	GER	Marten Weintschke
—	DF	RSA	Inzwirashe Zunga
—	FW	SRI	Aaqib Azeez
—	FW	ENG	Joel Houston
