= Coachella FC =

American soccer club

- Full name: Coachella Football Club
- Founded: 2024; 2 years ago
- Stadium: Bagdouma Park; Coachella, California
- Chairman: Luis Ignacio "Nacho" Bustillos
- Manager: Joe Aldape
- League: UPSL
- Website: Official website

The Coachella Football Club is a semi-professional American soccer team based in Coachella, California. Founded in January 2024, the team played in USL League Two for its inaugural season, before moving to the United Premier Soccer League in 2025.

The team plays its home games at Bagdouma Park. The team was founded by Chilean coach Rolando Inostroza who now owns Coachella SC. Luis Ignacio "Nacho" Bustillos is now in charge of the club.

== History ==
Coachella FC's inaugural match was against Capo FC on May 4, 2024, at Desert Mirage High School Stadium. In the inaugural match, the team lost 0–3. The team's first league goal came from left winger Leyver Guzman in a 1–4 loss to AMSG Futbol Club.

== Colors and crest ==
Coachella FC's home colors are White, Red, Green, Blue, and Yellow. Whilst its away colors are Black, Red, Green, Blue, and Yellow.

Season	Manufacture	Shirt Sponsor (chest)	Shirt Sponsors (sleeves)
2024	GDO	MT Radio	Napa of Coachella Valley, Twenty-Nine Palms Band of Mission Indians

== Players and staff ==
=== Roster ===
As of May 26, 2024

Note: Flags indicate national team as defined under FIFA eligibility rules; some limited exceptions apply. Players may hold more than one non-FIFA nationality.

No.	Pos.	Nation	Player
1	GK	USA	M. Rios
2	DF	USA	Jonathan Gomez
3	DF	USA	A. Villa
4	DF	DOM	Jorge Blanc
5	DF	USA	Frankie Villalta
6	DF	PHI	T. Balleza
7	FW	USA	S. Varas
10	MF	USA	R. Moscato
12	MF	USA	Brian Benjume

No.	Pos.	Nation	Player
13	DF	TJK	Komil Khatamov
14	MF	USA	L. Mendez
15	FW	USA	Samuel Baraka
16	FW	USA	Adan Rios
21	DF	USA	B. Lopez
33	GK	USA	Josiah Emerson
—	MF	USA	A. Sanchez
—		USA	R. Clawson
—		USA	G. Batres
—		USA	J. Alcala

=== Coaching staff ===
As of May 26, 2024

Coaching Staff
Head Coach	Joe Aldape
Assistant Coach	Aldo Caro
Athletic Director	Carlos Bustillos
Athletic Coach	Octavio "Tavo" Bustillos
Goalkeeping Coach	German Samayoa

== Year by year ==
Year	Division	League	Regular season	Playoffs	Open Cup	Avg. attendance
2024	4	USL League Two	8th in Division	Did not Qualify	Did not Qualify	TBD
