= Arizona Arsenal SC =

- Full name: Arizona Arsenal Soccer Club
- Founded: 1992
- Ground: Legacy Sports Park
- Capacity: 5,000
- Manager: Adam Burke
- League: USL League Two (Southwest Division)
- Website: https://www.azarsenalsc.org
Home colours	Away colours	Third colours

Arizona Arsenal Soccer Club is an American soccer club based in Phoenix, Arizona that plays in USL League Two, the fourth tier of the United States Soccer Pyramid. The club was founded in the 1992 as a recreational club and has since grown to become a large semi-professional soccer club in Arizona.

== History ==
Arizona Arsenal SC was founded in 1992 as a recreational soccer club in the Phoenix area. Arizona Arsenal Soccer Club (formally Gilbert Soccer Club) was created in 1992 as an offshoot of the Gilbert Youth Soccer Association (GYSA). GYSA recognized the need in the community to create a place where highly advanced players could develop and compete throughout Arizona. In the early 2000s, the club began to transition towards a more competitive focus, bringing on directors of coaching like Tim Barmettler who helped the club retain more players.

In the 2010s, Arizona Arsenal continued to grow and expand, opening their own training facility at the Legacy Sports Park which features 20 turf fields, 4 and natural grass fields. The club now fields over 50 youth teams across both the boys' and girls' programs. Arizona Arsenal has had strong success in state and regional competitions, with multiple teams reaching the state final four.

In 2023, Arizona Arsenal SC announced that they would be joining USL League Two, the top pre-professional men's league in the United States and Canada.

== Pre-Professional Pathway ==
In addition to their USL League Two team, Arizona Arsenal SC developed a pre-professional pathway for their top players. This includes:

- Arizona Arsenal Academy - The club's elite youth development program
- Arizona Arsenal Prep - A post-graduate program for players looking to pursue college opportunities
- Arizona Arsenal Premier - The club's top-level competitive teams that compete in high-level leagues like the Elite Clubs National League
