= Redlands High School =

High school in Redlands, California

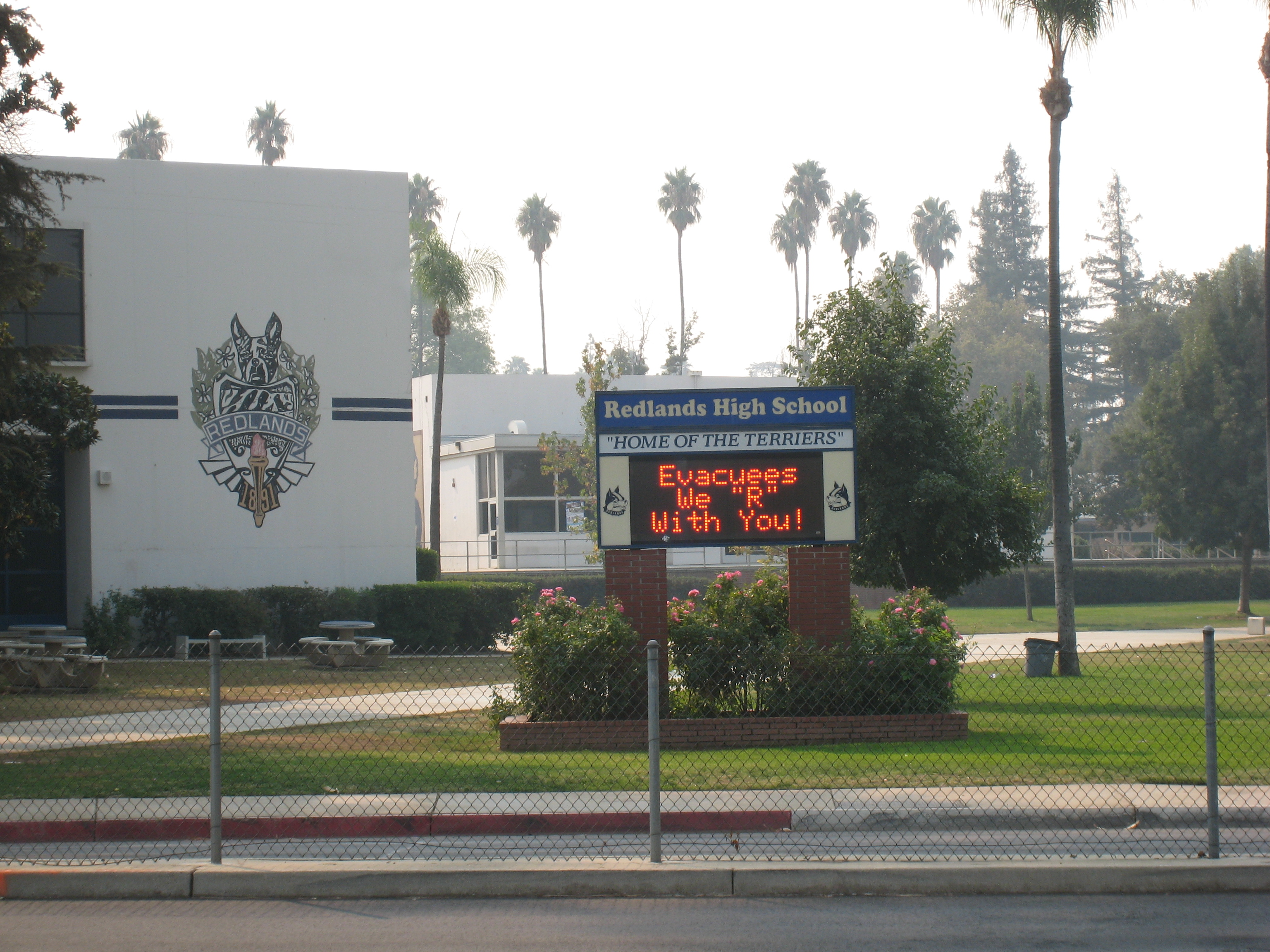
- Redlands High School during October 2007 fires

Location
- 840 East Citrus Avenue; Redlands, San Bernardino County, California 92374; United States; 34°3′20″N 117°10′21″W

Information
- School type: Public, Secondary
- Established: 1891
- School district: Redlands Unified School District
- Principal: Wes Cullen
- Teaching staff: 101.81 (FTE)
- Grades: 9-12
- Enrollment: 2,189(2024-2025)
- Student to teacher ratio: 21.80
- Colors: Blue and White
- Nickname: Terriers
- Rival: Redlands East Valley High School
- Newspaper: The Hobachi
- Yearbook: The Makio
- Website: redlandsusd.net/rhs

Redlands High School (RHS) is a high school located in Redlands, California. It is the oldest Californian public high school still functioning on its original site.

== History ==
Also known as Redlands Union High School or Redlands Senior High School, RHS was originally built in 1891 as a "unified high school", formed from elementary districts of Redlands, Crafton and Lugonia. Its Clock auditorium was completed in 1928. The Girls' Gymnasium was completed as a New Deal Era project by the Public Works Administration in 1936.

Located on 65 acres, the campus is divided by a major thoroughfare into South Campus (the original site) and North Campus.

== Notable alumni ==
- Kat Von D, tattoo artist
- Dave Aranda, college football head coach for the Baylor Bears
- Robin Backhaus, bronze medalist in the 1972 Olympics' 200M butterfly event
- Joan Baez, folksinger
- Ed Vande Berg, Major League Baseball pitcher
- Brian Billick, head coach of the Baltimore Ravens
- Donna L. Crisp, U.S. Navy officer
- Lil Xan, rapper
- Julio Cruz, 2nd baseman for the Seattle Mariners from 1977 to 1982
- Jack Dangermond, co-founder and CEO of the software company ESRI
- Brian DeRoo, former professional football player
- Skip Ewing, country music singer
- James Fallows, author
- Sera Gamble, television writer and producer
- Greg Horton, professional football player with the Los Angeles Rams (from 1976 to 1980) and the Tampa Bay Buccaneers
- Patrick Johnson, professional football player
- John Jorgenson, guitarist
- Jakobie Keeney-James, NFL wide receiver for the Green Bay Packers
- Brad Little, actor
- Carl W. McIntosh, president of Idaho State University (from 1946 to 1959), California State University, Long Beach (from 1959 to 1970), and Montana State University (from 1971 to 1977)
- Frank Moore, performance artist and 2008 presidential candidate
- Leah Pruett, drag-racer
- Michael A. Rogers, author
- George T. Sakato, World War II Medal of Honor recipient
- Jim Weatherwax, professional football player for the Green Bay Packers.

== Awards ==
- California Distinguished School Awards (1990, 1992, 1994, 2018 and 2020)
- California Gold Ribbon School, 2015.
