= Jackson Kasanzu =

Tanzanian footballer

Personal information
- Full name: Jackson Simba Kasanzu
- Date of birth: 21 April 2003 (age 23)
- Place of birth: Dar es Salaam, Tanzania
- Height: 1.88 m (6 ft 2 in)
- Position: Defender

Senior career*
Years	Team	Apps	(Gls)
2022	AFC Ann Arbor	9	(0)
2022–2023	San Diego Loyal	19	(2)
2025	Tormenta FC	24	(1)
2026–	Peoria City		
- * Club domestic league appearances and goals as of 11:05, 2 November 2025 (UTC)

Jackson Simba Kasanzu (born 21 April 2003), is a Tanzanian footballer who plays as a defender for USL League Two club Peoria City.

== Career ==
Kasanzu, originally from Dar es Salaam in Tanzania, signed with USL League Two side AFC Ann Arbor for their 2022 season, where he made nine regular season appearances. On 12 August 2022, Kasanzu signed his first professional contract, joining USL Championship side San Diego Loyal SC. He made six appearances and scored a single goal as he helped San Diego to the playoffs in their 2022 season.

After being sidelined throughout 2024 with an injury, Kasanzu returned to soccer in January 2025, signing with Tormenta FC of USL League One. On 1 December 2025, his contract expired due to Tormenta FC not fielding a team for the 2026 season.

On 17 March 2026, Kasanzu signed for Peoria City in USL League Two.
