= 2017 Missouri Valley Conference men's soccer tournament =

- Classification: Division I
- Teams: 7
- Matches: 6
- Site: Shea Stadium; Peoria, Illinois
- Champions: Central Arkansas (1st title)
- Winning coach: Ross Duncan (1st title)
- Broadcast: ESPN3

2017 Missouri Valley Conference men's soccer standings
	Conf.					Overall
Team	W		L		T	W		L		T
Missouri State	5	–	2	–	1	9	–	5	–	3
Central Arkansas ‡	5	–	3	–	0	9	–	11	–	1
Bradley	4	–	3	–	1	10	–	7	–	3
Evansville	3	–	4	–	1	11	–	8	–	2
Loyola Chicago	3	–	4	–	1	7	–	8	–	3
Valparaiso	3	–	5	–	0	8	–	9	–	1
Drake	2	–	4	–	2	6	–	10	–	2
‡ – 2017 MVC Tournament champion + – Invited to the 2017 NCAA Division I Men's Soccer Championship; As of November 17, 2017; Rankings from United Soccer Coaches

The 2017 Missouri Valley Conference men's soccer tournament was the 28th edition of the competition. The tournament was played from November 8 until November 11.

The Central Arkansas Bears won the tournament, defeating Missouri State Bears on a golden goal. The win give the UCA their first ever MVC men's soccer championship, and their berth into the 2017 NCAA Division I men's soccer tournament. In the NCAA Tournament, Central Arkansas was drawn in the first round against the SMU Mustangs. There, they lost to SMU, 2-0.

== Background ==
The 2017 Missouri Valley Conference Men's Soccer Tournament is the culmination of the regular season. The regular season conference matches determine the seeding in the tournament, which determines the conference's automatic berth into the NCAA Tournament. All teams in the Missouri Valley Conference, or MVC, play each other once during the season. Teams play certain teams at home during even number years, and then will play those teams on the road during odd number years. Teams are awarded three points for a win, a point for a draw and no points for a loss.

In the event that teams are tied on points, the first tiebreaker is head-to-head record. If that tiebreaker is tied, goal differential is applied, followed by goals scored, then away goals, then RPI.

Missouri State won the regular season with a 5-2-1 record.

== Seeding ==
Seed	School	Conference	Tiebreaker
1	Missouri State	5–2–1	
2	Central Arkansas	5–3–0	
3	Bradley	4–3–1	
4	Loyola–Chicago	4–3–1	1–0 vs Evansville
5	Evansville	4–3–1	0–1 vs Loyola–Chicago
6	Vaparaiso	7–11	
7	Drake	7–11	

== Bracket ==
Wild card
November 7 – 12:00 p.m.
6	Valparaiso	2
7	Drake	4

Quarterfinals
November 8 – 6:00 p.m.
3	Bradley	3
7	Drake	1
November 8 – 3:00 p.m.
4	Loyola Chicago	0
5	Evansville	1

Semifinals
November 10 – 6:00 p.m.
2	Central Arkansas (p)	1 (8)
3	Bradley	1 (7)
November 10 – 3:00 p.m.
1	Missouri State (p)	0 (6)
5	Evansville	0 (5)

Final
November 12 – 1:00 p.m.
2	Central Arkansas (g.g.)	1
1	Missouri State	0

== Results ==
=== Opening round ===
November 7
12:00 p.m. CST

^{No. 6} Valparaiso Crusaders	2–4	^{No. 7} Drake Bulldogs
Mentzingen 58'; Garcia 77'	Report	Peterson 71'; Taylor 75'; Enzugusi 83'; Jaimes 90'

Shea Stadium, Peoria, Illinois
Attendance: 87
Referee: Andrew Dennis

=== Quarterfinals ===
November 8
3:00 p.m. CST

^{No. 4} Loyola Ramblers	0–1	^{No. 5} Evansville Purple Aces
	Report	McGrath 58'

Shea Stadium, Peoria, Illinois
Attendance: 319
Referee: Joshua Brooks
November 8
6:00 p.m. CST

^{No. 4} Bradley Braves	3–1	^{No. 7} Drake Bulldogs
Schindler 48'; Ciaramitaro 49'; Wintermeyer 75'	Report	Dowling 27'

Shea Stadium, Peoria, Illinois
Attendance: 319
Referee: Joshua Brooks

=== Semifinals ===
November 8
3:00 p.m. CST

^{No. 1} Missouri State Bears	0–0 (a.e.t.)	^{No. 5} Evansville Purple Aces
	Report
Penalties
Buckle (penalty scored); Dolling (penalty scored); Jones (penalty missed); Wilkin (penalty scored); Stroud (penalty scored); Robins (penalty scored); Wu (penalty scored)	6–5	(penalty scored) Blaydes; (penalty scored) Stafford; (penalty scored) McGrath; (penalty missed) Shuck; (penalty scored) Snow; (penalty scored) Baum; (penalty missed) DeWeese

Shea Stadium, Peoria, Illinois
Attendance: 319
Referee: Joshua Brooks
November 8
6:00 p.m. CST

^{No. 2} Central Arkansas Bears	0–0 (a.e.t.)	^{No. 3} Bradley Braves
	Report
Penalties
Strickler (penalty scored); San Roman (penalty scored); Knutson (penalty scored); Genty (penalty scored); Brodacki (penalty scored); Kubota (penalty scored); Anderson (penalty scored); Ilia (penalty scored)	8–7	(penalty scored) Ciaramitaro; (penalty scored) Bak; (penalty scored) Wintermeyer; (penalty scored) Dayekh; (penalty scored) Emerson; (penalty scored) Perry; (penalty scored) Lwanga; (penalty missed) Schindler

Shea Stadium, Peoria, Illinois
Attendance: 319
Referee: Ben Trevino

=== MVC Championship ===
November 12
1:00 p.m. CDT

^{No. 1} Missouri State Bears	0–1 (a.e.t.)	^{No. 2} Central Arkansas Bears
	Report	Brodacki 95'

Shea Stadium, Peoria, Illinois
Attendance: 127
Referee: Landis Wiley

== Honors and awards ==
=== Most valuable player ===
- Niklas Brodacki, Central Arkansas

=== MVC All-Tournament team ===
**MVC Men's Soccer All-Tournament team**

Rafael Mentzingen, Valparaiso
Jake Taylor, Drake
Kyle Thomson, Loyola
Ian McGrath, Evansville
Simon Waever, Evansville
Jacob Taylor, Bradley
Gerit Wintermeyer, Bradley
Liam Priestley, Missouri State
Nick Burtenshaw, Missouri State
Jordy Robins, Missouri State
Tyler Ridener, Central Arkansas
Blake Stricker, Central Arkansas
Pepe San Roman, Central Arkansas
**Niklas Brodacki, Central Arkansas**

MVP in Bold

== See also ==
- 2017 Missouri Valley Conference Women's Soccer Tournament
