= Alec Hughes (soccer) =

American soccer player (born 2002)

Personal information
- Full name: Alec Hughes
- Date of birth: January 22, 2002 (age 24)
- Place of birth: Glastonbury, Connecticut, United States
- Position: Striker

Youth career
- Farmington Soccer Academy FC
- Glastonbury High School

College career
Years	Team	Apps	(Gls)
2020–2024	UMass Minutemen	87	(51)

Senior career*
Years	Team	Apps	(Gls)
2022	Hartford City FC	0	(0)
2023-2024	Western Mass Pioneers	23	(26)
2025	Los Angeles FC	0	(0)
2025	→ Los Angeles FC 2 (loan)	6	(2)
2026–	Charleston Battery	3	(0)
- * Club domestic league appearances and goals

Alec Hughes (born January 22, 2002) is an American professional soccer player who plays as a striker for USL Championship club Charleston Battery.

== Early life ==
Born in Glastonbury, Connecticut, Hughes started his youth career with the Farmington Soccer Academy FC and his high school, Glastonbury High School.

== College career ==
Hughes concluded his UMass career with 110 points on 51 goals and eight assists in 87 appearances. He was named to United Soccer Coaches Second Team All-America in addition to First Team All-Region and Atlantic 10 First Team All-Conference. The forward tabbed New England Soccer Journal's DI Men's Player of the Year for his efforts in the 2024 campaign, including an All-ECAC First Team Selection.

== Club career ==
=== Los Angeles FC ===
Hughes was selected with the No. 22 overall selection by the Los Angeles FC in the 2025 MLS SuperDraft.

==== Los Angeles FC 2 ====
After being drafted by LAFC, he was assigned to the MLS Next Pro team LAFC2. He appeared in 6 games and scored 2 goals.

=== Charleston Battery ===
On February 9th 2026, Charleston Battery announced they had signed Hughes for the 2026 season.

He made his debut with the team on May 30th against Detroit City, and on June 9th against TB Rowdies, playing sparingly as a late game sub. He gained a few more minutes a few days later against Tulsa FC.

On June 20th; Hughes subbed in for Colton Swan in the 71st minute against Sporting JAX, he later scored his first goal ever with the Battery in the 82' minute.

== Career statistics ==
Appearances and goals by club, season and competition
Club	Season	League			National cup		Playoffs		Continental		Other		Total	
Club	Season	Division	Apps	Goals	Apps	Goals	Apps	Goals	Apps	Goals	Apps	Goals	Apps	Goals
Hartford City FC	2022	NPSL	0	0	—		—		—		—		0	0
Western Mass Pioneers	2023	USL2	9	9	—		1	1	—		—		10	10
Western Mass Pioneers	2024*	USL2	11	15	—		2	1	—		—		13	16
Western Mass Pioneers	Total		20	24	0	0	3	2	0	0	0	0	23	26
Los Angeles FC 2	2025	MLS Next Pro	6	2	—		—		—		—		6	2
Los Angeles FC	2025	MLS	0	0	—		—		—		—		0	0
Los Angeles FC	Total		6	2	0	0	0	0	0	0	0	0	6	2
Charleston Battery	2026	USLC	4	1	—		—		—		—		4	1
Charleston Battery	Total		4	1	0	0	0	0	0	0	0	0	4	1
Career total			30	27	0	0	3	2	0	0	0	0	33	29
