= 2024 USL League Two season =

USL League Two
- Season: 2024
- Dates: May 4 – July 14 (Regular season); July 19 – August 3 (Playoffs)
- Champions: Seacoast United Phantoms (1st Title)
- Regular Season Champions: Seacoast United Phantoms (1st Title)
- Matches: 817
- Goals: 2,859 (3.5 per match)
- Best Player: (United States) Alec Hughes Western Mass Pioneers
- Top goalscorer: (United States) Alec Hughes Western Mass Pioneers (16 Goals)
- Best goalkeeper: (Poland) Tomasz Wroblewski Little Rock Rangers
- Biggest home win: BUF 10, DDL 0 (July 13); FCB 10, MCH 0 (July 13)
- Biggest away win: SCE 1, RDL 9 (May 11); IRN 0, LIR 8 (June 1)
- Highest scoring: SCE 1, RDL 9 (May 11); MAN 7, SCR 3 (June 8); ROY 5, CCH 5 (June 19); CCH 8, HIL 2 (June 22); BUF 10, DDL 0 (July 13); HVH 5, MOR 5 (July 13); FCB 10, MCH 0 (July 13)
- Longest winning run: 8 matches Seacoast United Phantoms
- Longest unbeaten run: 14 matches Salem City FC; 12 matches Asheville City SC; Little Rock Rangers
- Longest winless run: 14 matches Black Rock FC; Michiana Lions FC; 12 matches CISA; New Jersey Copa FC; Chicago Dutch Lions
- Longest losing run: 12 matches Chicago Dutch Lions; CISA
- All statistics correct as of August 3, 2024.

The 2024 USL League Two season was the 29th season of USL League Two, a semi-professional soccer league in the United States and Canada.

The season featured 128 teams, organized into 4 conferences and 18 divisions. The regular season ran from May 4 to July 14.

== Team changes ==
=== New teams ===
- Almaden FC (Almaden Valley, CA)
- AMSG FC (Huntington Beach, CA)
- Athens United (Athens, GA)
- Birmingham Legion 2
- Brooke House FC (Maitland, FL)
- Charlottesville Blues FC (Charlottesville, VA)
- Coachella FC (Coachella, CA)
- Dothan United SC (Dothan, AL)
- Hattiesburg FC (Hattiesburg, MS)
- Hill Country Lobos (Kyle, TX)
- Inter Gainesville KF (Gainesville, FL)
- Midlakes United (Bellevue, WA)
- River Light FC (Aurora, IL)
- Sueño FC (Joliet, IL)
- Utah Avalanche (Midvale, UT)
- Utah United (Utah County, UT)
- Tacoma Stars FC
- Union FC Macomb (Macomb, MI)
- West Seattle Junction FC

=== Departing teams ===
- Altitude SA Rush
- Dalton Red Wolves SC
- FC Carolinas
- FC Euro New York
- FC Miami City
- FC Manitoba
- FC Wichita
- LA Parish SC
- North Alabama SC
- Park City Red Wolves SC
- PDX FC
- Round Rock SC
- Texas United

=== Moves ===
- Springfield Athletic SC (Springfield, IL) to Staten Island Athletic SC (Staten Island, NY)

=== Name changes ===
- Boulder County United to Albion SC Colorado
- North Carolina Fusion U23 to Salem City FC
- Oly Town FC to FC Olympia
- South Bend Lions to Michiana Lions FC
- The Villages SC to Brave SC
- Southern California Seahorses to Southern California Eagles

=== Map ===
Locations of teams who participated in the 2024 season.

Eastern Conference: Northeast Division Mid Atlantic Division Metropolitan Division Chesapeake Division South Atlantic Division
Central Conference: Great Lakes Division Heartland Division Valley Division Deep North Division
Southern Conference: South Central Division Southeast Division South Florida Division Mid South Division Lone Star Division
Western Conference: Mountain Division Northwest Division NorCal Division Southwest Division

== Standings ==
=== Eastern Conference ===
==== Northeast Division ====
Pos	Team	Pld	W	D	L	GF	GA	GD	Pts	PPG	Qualification
1	Seacoast United Phantoms (R, Q)	14	13	0	1	40	10	+30	39	2.79	Advance to USL League Two Playoffs
2	Western Mass Pioneers (Q)	14	11	1	2	43	8	+35	34	2.43	Advance to playoff qualifying round
3	Vermont Green FC (Q)	13	9	2	2	31	9	+22	29	2.23	Advance to playoff qualifying round
4	Boston Bolts	12	6	3	3	19	8	+11	21	1.75	
5	AC Connecticut	14	5	3	6	25	41	−16	18	1.29	
6	Albany Rush	14	3	3	8	16	26	−10	12	0.86	
7	Pathfinder FC	14	3	2	9	22	38	−16	11	0.79	
8	Boston City FC	13	2	2	9	12	41	−29	8	0.62	
9	Black Rock FC	14	0	2	12	5	32	−27	2	0.14	

Source: USL
(Q) Qualified for the phase indicated; (R) Regular Season Champions

==== Mid Atlantic Division ====
Pos	Team	Pld	W	D	L	GF	GA	GD	Pts	PPG	Qualification
1	Ocean City Nor'easters (Q)	12	9	0	3	30	9	+21	27	2.25	Advance to USL League Two Playoffs
2	Reading United AC (Q)	12	7	2	3	32	20	+12	23	1.92	Advance to playoff qualifying round
3	West Chester United SC	12	7	2	3	25	15	+10	23	1.92	
4	Real Central New Jersey	12	5	1	6	18	26	−8	16	1.33	
5	Philadelphia Lone Star FC	12	3	1	8	19	37	−18	10	0.83	
6	Lehigh Valley United	12	1	2	9	12	29	−17	5	0.42	

Source: USL
(Q) Qualified for the phase indicated

==== Metropolitan Division ====
Pos	Team	Pld	W	D	L	GF	GA	GD	Pts	PPG	Qualification
1	Long Island Rough Riders (Q)	12	9	2	1	31	10	+21	29	2.42	Advance to USL League Two Playoffs
2	FC Motown STA (Q)	12	8	3	1	37	11	+26	27	2.25	Advance to playoff qualifying round
3	Hudson Valley Hammers	12	7	3	2	28	19	+9	24	2.00	
4	Manhattan SC	12	7	2	3	28	17	+11	23	1.92	
5	Westchester Flames	12	6	1	5	25	20	+5	19	1.58	
6	Cedar Stars Rush	12	5	1	6	21	21	0	16	1.33	
7	Staten Island Athletic SC	12	4	2	6	9	23	−14	14	1.17	
8	Morris Elite SC	12	3	3	6	18	23	−5	12	1.00	
9	Ironbound SC	12	1	2	9	11	41	−30	5	0.42	
10	New Jersey Copa FC	12	0	1	11	6	29	−23	1	0.08	

Source: USL
(Q) Qualified for the phase indicated

==== Chesapeake Division ====
Pos	Team	Pld	W	D	L	GF	GA	GD	Pts	PPG	Qualification
1	Lionsbridge FC (Q)	12	9	2	1	26	13	+13	29	2.42	Advance to USL League Two Playoffs
2	Virginia Beach United (Q)	12	9	2	1	29	9	+20	29	2.42	Advance to playoff qualifying round
3	Charlottesville Blues FC	12	7	2	3	24	16	+8	23	1.92	
4	Northern Virginia FC	12	5	2	5	29	18	+11	17	1.42	
5	Christos FC	12	2	3	7	17	26	−9	9	0.75	
6	Patuxent Football Athletics	12	2	1	9	19	24	−5	7	0.58	
7	Virginia Marauders FC	12	2	0	10	8	46	−38	6	0.50	

Source: USL
(Q) Qualified for the phase indicated

==== South Atlantic Division ====
Pos	Team	Pld	W	D	L	GF	GA	GD	Pts	PPG	Qualification
1	Salem City FC (Q)	14	9	5	0	30	12	+18	32	2.29	Advance to USL League Two Playoffs
2	SC United Bantams (Q)	14	7	4	3	33	24	+9	25	1.79	Advance to playoff qualifying round
3	North Carolina FC U23	14	7	3	4	31	21	+10	24	1.71	
4	Charlotte Eagles	14	5	4	5	29	30	−1	19	1.36	
5	West Virginia United	14	4	4	6	23	26	−3	16	1.14	
6	Wake FC	14	4	4	6	22	29	−7	16	1.14	
7	Tobacco Road FC	14	2	5	7	18	27	−9	11	0.79	
8	Charlotte Independence 2	14	2	3	9	16	33	−17	9	0.64	

Source: USL
(Q) Qualified for the phase indicated

=== Central Conference ===
==== Great Lakes Division ====
Pos	Team	Pld	W	D	L	GF	GA	GD	Pts	PPG	Qualification
1	Flint City Bucks (Q)	14	10	3	1	39	16	+23	33	2.36	Advance to USL League Two Playoffs
2	Midwest United FC (Q)	14	10	1	3	28	13	+15	31	2.21	Advance to USL League Two Playoffs
3	Kalamazoo FC	14	8	3	3	37	15	+22	27	1.93	
4	AFC Ann Arbor	14	8	2	4	29	18	+11	26	1.86	
5	Oakland County FC	14	4	2	8	16	26	−10	14	1.00	
6	Lansing City Football	14	3	4	7	20	25	−5	13	0.93	
7	Union FC Macomb	14	4	1	9	21	28	−7	13	0.93	
8	Michiana Lions FC	14	0	2	12	6	55	−49	2	0.14	

Source: USL
(Q) Qualified for the phase indicated

==== Heartland Division ====
Pos	Team	Pld	W	D	L	GF	GA	GD	Pts	PPG	Qualification
1	Des Moines Menace (Q)	12	9	2	1	39	10	+29	29	2.42	Advance to USL League Two Playoffs
2	Peoria City (Q)	12	8	3	1	35	13	+22	27	2.25	Advance to USL League Two Playoffs
3	River Light FC	12	7	3	2	26	20	+6	24	2.00	
4	St. Charles FC	12	6	3	3	37	20	+17	21	1.75	
5	Sueño FC	12	3	1	8	22	34	−12	10	0.83	
6	Chicago City SC	12	2	2	8	16	30	−14	8	0.67	
7	Chicago Dutch Lions	12	0	0	12	5	53	−48	0	0.00	

Source: USL
(Q) Qualified for the phase indicated

==== Valley Division ====
Pos	Team	Pld	W	D	L	GF	GA	GD	Pts	PPG	Qualification
1	Fort Wayne FC (Q)	12	8	2	2	20	10	+10	26	2.17	Advance to USL League Two Playoffs
2	Cleveland Force SC (Q)	12	5	5	2	22	19	+3	20	1.67	Advance to USL League Two Playoffs
3	Toledo Villa FC	12	5	4	3	18	14	+4	19	1.58	
4	FC Buffalo	12	5	3	4	36	23	+13	18	1.50	
5	Kings Hammer FC	12	2	4	6	14	19	−5	10	0.83	
6	Dayton Dutch Lions	12	2	0	10	5	30	−25	6	0.50	

Source: USL
(Q) Qualified for the phase indicated

==== Deep North Division ====
Pos	Team	Pld	W	D	L	GF	GA	GD	Pts	PPG	Qualification
1	Thunder Bay Chill (Q)	12	8	1	3	25	14	+11	25	2.08	Advance to USL League Two Playoffs
2	Bavarian United SC (Q)	12	6	3	3	23	17	+6	21	1.75	Advance to USL League Two Playoffs
3	RKC Third Coast	12	6	1	5	21	16	+5	19	1.58	
4	St. Croix SC	12	5	2	5	23	18	+5	17	1.42	
5	Minneapolis City SC	12	5	0	7	11	18	−7	15	1.25	
6	Rochester FC	12	2	1	9	9	29	−20	7	0.58	

Source: USL
(Q) Qualified for the phase indicated

=== Southern Conference ===
==== South Central Division ====
Pos	Team	Pld	W	D	L	GF	GA	GD	Pts	PPG	Qualification
1	Asheville City SC (Q)	12	10	2	0	37	6	+31	32	2.67	Advance to USL League Two Playoffs
2	Tennessee SC (Q)	12	6	2	4	23	18	+5	20	1.67	Advance to USL League Two Playoffs
3	Dothan United SC	12	4	4	4	17	16	+1	16	1.33	
4	Southern Soccer Academy Kings	12	4	3	5	20	22	−2	15	1.25	
5	East Atlanta Dutch Lions	12	4	3	5	22	25	−3	15	1.25	
6	Athens United	12	2	3	7	7	24	−17	9	0.75	
7	Birmingham Legion 2	12	1	5	6	8	23	−15	8	0.67	

Source: USL
(Q) Qualified for the phase indicated

==== Southeast Division ====
Pos	Team	Pld	W	D	L	GF	GA	GD	Pts	PPG	Qualification
1	Brave SC (Q)	12	9	2	1	38	8	+30	29	2.42	Advance to USL League Two Playoffs
2	NONA FC (Q)	12	9	2	1	35	13	+22	29	2.42	Advance to USL League Two Playoffs
3	Florida Elite SA	12	6	3	3	21	15	+6	21	1.75	
4	Inter Gainesville KF	12	3	1	8	15	27	−12	10	0.83	
5	Brooke House FC	12	1	4	7	11	29	−18	7	0.58	
6	Brevard SC	12	1	2	9	9	37	−28	5	0.42	

Source: USL
(Q) Qualified for the phase indicated

==== South Florida Division ====
Pos	Team	Pld	W	D	L	GF	GA	GD	Pts	PPG	Qualification
1	Sarasota Paradise (Q)	12	8	3	1	26	13	+13	27	2.25	Advance to USL League Two Playoffs
2	Miami AC	12	8	2	2	19	14	+5	26	2.17	
3	Tampa Bay United	11	5	4	2	21	19	+2	19	1.73	
4	St. Petersburg FC	12	3	0	9	20	25	−5	9	0.75	
5	Swan City SC	12	2	3	7	9	16	−7	9	0.75	
6	Weston FC	11	2	2	7	4	12	−8	8	0.73	

Source: USL
(Q) Qualified for the phase indicated

==== Mid South Division ====
Pos	Team	Pld	W	D	L	GF	GA	GD	Pts	PPG	Qualification
1	Little Rock Rangers (Q)	12	9	3	0	21	3	+18	30	2.50	Advance to USL League Two Playoffs
2	Louisiana Krewe FC	12	6	2	4	21	19	+2	20	1.67	
3	Mississippi Brilla	12	5	2	5	17	16	+1	17	1.42	
4	Hattiesburg FC	12	4	2	6	15	17	−2	14	1.17	
5	Blue Goose SC	12	1	1	10	15	34	−19	4	0.33	

Source: USL
(Q) Qualified for the phase indicated

==== Lone Star Division ====
Pos	Team	Pld	W	D	L	GF	GA	GD	Pts	PPG	Qualification
1	Corpus Christi FC (Q)	12	10	1	1	45	14	+31	31	2.58	Advance to USL League Two Playoffs
2	AHFC Royals (Q)	12	9	3	0	33	16	+17	30	2.50	Advance to USL League Two Playoffs
3	Twin City Toucans FC	12	5	3	4	21	21	0	18	1.50	
4	Houston FC	12	2	4	6	17	26	−9	10	0.83	
5	AC Houston Sur	12	1	3	8	7	21	−14	6	0.50	
6	Hill Country Lobos	12	1	2	9	21	46	−25	5	0.42	

Source: USL
(Q) Qualified for the phase indicated

=== Western Conference ===
==== Mountain Division ====
Pos	Team	Pld	W	D	L	GF	GA	GD	Pts	PPG	Qualification
1	Flatirons SC (Q)	12	8	3	1	34	12	+22	27	2.25	Advance to USL League Two Playoffs
2	Albion SC Colorado (Q)	12	6	4	2	22	12	+10	22	1.83	Advance to USL League Two Playoffs
3	Utah United	12	6	3	3	23	13	+10	21	1.75	
4	New Mexico United U23	11	5	2	4	18	15	+3	17	1.55	
5	Utah Avalanche	12	4	3	5	14	19	−5	15	1.25	
6	Salt City SC	11	2	5	4	18	15	+3	11	1.00	
7	CISA	12	0	0	12	6	49	−43	0	0.00	

Source: USL
(Q) Qualified for the phase indicated

==== Northwest Division ====
Pos	Team	Pld	W	D	L	GF	GA	GD	Pts	PPG	Qualification
1	Ballard FC (Q)	14	9	2	3	40	16	+24	29	2.07	Advance to USL League Two Playoffs
2	United PDX (Q)	14	9	2	3	23	10	+13	29	2.07	Advance to USL League Two Playoffs
3	Tacoma Stars FC	14	7	2	5	35	27	+8	23	1.64	
4	Midlakes United	14	5	3	6	19	23	−4	18	1.29	
5	West Seattle Junction FC	14	4	5	5	25	34	−9	17	1.21	
6	Lane United FC	14	4	3	7	18	20	−2	15	1.07	
7	FC Olympia	14	3	4	7	19	32	−13	13	0.93	
8	Capital FC Atletico	14	3	3	8	19	36	−17	12	0.86	

Source: USL
(Q) Qualified for the phase indicated

==== Nor Cal Division ====
Pos	Team	Pld	W	D	L	GF	GA	GD	Pts	PPG	Qualification
1	Almaden FC (Q)	14	8	4	2	24	15	+9	28	2.00	Advance to USL League Two Playoffs
2	Project 51O (Q)	14	9	1	4	32	29	+3	28	2.00	Advance to USL League Two Playoffs
3	San Francisco Glens SC	14	8	1	5	27	16	+11	25	1.79	
4	Monterey Bay FC 2	14	7	2	5	25	22	+3	23	1.64	
5	San Francisco City FC	14	5	3	6	14	18	−4	18	1.29	
6	Davis Legacy SC	14	4	3	7	23	29	−6	15	1.07	
7	Academica SC	14	3	3	8	21	26	−5	12	0.86	
8	Marin FC Legends	14	2	3	9	20	31	−11	9	0.64	

Source: USL
(Q) Qualified for the phase indicated

==== Southwest Division ====
Pos	Team	Pld	W	D	L	GF	GA	GD	Pts	PPG	Qualification
1	Ventura County Fusion (Q)	14	11	2	1	41	11	+30	35	2.50	Advance to USL League Two Playoffs
2	FC Tucson (Q)	14	7	5	2	33	18	+15	26	1.86	Advance to USL League Two Playoffs
3	AMSG FC	14	7	2	5	22	21	+1	23	1.64	
4	Redlands FC	14	6	4	4	38	28	+10	22	1.57	
5	Arizona Arsenal SC	14	4	6	4	22	23	−1	18	1.29	
6	Capo FC	14	5	2	7	29	26	+3	17	1.21	
7	Southern California Eagles	14	2	1	11	20	48	−28	7	0.50	
8	Coachella FC	14	1	4	9	20	50	−30	7	0.50	

Source: USL
(Q) Qualified for the phase indicated

== Playoffs ==
=== Bracket ===
Conference Quarterfinals	Conference Semifinals
Ocean City Nor'easters*	0
Seacoast United Phantoms	1
Seacoast United Phantoms	3
Vermont Green FC	0
Long Island Rough Riders	1
Vermont Green FC	3
Eastern Conference
Lionsbridge FC*	2
Western Mass Pioneers	1
Lionsbridge FC*	2
Salem City FC	0
Salem City FC (p)	2 (3)
Virginia Beach United	2 (2)
Asheville City SC*	4
NONA FC	0
Asheville City SC*	2
Brave SC	1
Brave SC	2
Sarasota Paradise	1
Southern Conference
Little Rock Rangers*	5
AHFC Royals	2
Little Rock Rangers*	1(4)
Corpus Christi FC (p)	1(5)
Corpus Christi FC	5
Tennessee SC	3
Flint City Bucks*	1
Cleveland Force SC	0
Flint City Bucks* (a.e.t.)	2
Fort Wayne FC	1
Fort Wayne FC (p)	0 (5)
Midwest United FC	0 (4)
Central Conference
Peoria City*	2
Thunder Bay Chill	0
Peoria City* (p)	5(4)
Des Moines Menace	5(2)
Des Moines Menace	2
Bavarian United SC	0
Ballard FC*	1
Project 51O	2
Project 51O (a.e.t.)	5
United PDX	4
Almaden FC	0
United PDX	1
Western Conference
FC Tucson*	3
Flatirons SC	2
FC Tucson*	1
Ventura County Fusion	0
Ventura County Fusion	2
Albion SC Colorado	1

Conference Finals
Seacoast United Phantoms	6
Lionsbridge FC*	3
Asheville City SC	1
Corpus Christi FC	0
Flint City Bucks	0
Peoria City*	1
Project 51O	1
FC Tucson	2

National Semifinals
Seacoast United Phantoms	1
Asheville City SC	0
Peoria City*	5
FC Tucson	1

National Final
Seacoast United Phantoms (a.e.t.)	3
Peoria City*	2

=== Eastern Conference Qualifying Round ===
July 16	Vermont Green FC	1–0	Reading United AC	Virtue Field; Burlington, Vermont
7:00 PM EDT	Zengue (yellow card) 19'; Ndiaye (yellow card) 58'; Bazini 90+'; Waterman (yellow card) 90+'	Report	McDaid (yellow card) 72'	Attendance: 2,500; Referee: Jace Laquerre

July 16	Western Mass Pioneers	3–1 (a.e.t.)	FC Motown STA	Lusitano Stadium; Ludlow, Massachusetts
7:30 PM EDT	Hughes 84' (pen.); Smith (yellow card) 88'; Testori (yellow card) 90+4'; Kelly (red card) 102'; Taleb 105'; Nievas (yellow card) 118'; Oberrauch (yellow card) 118'; Jiana 120' (yellow card) 120'	Report	Bouregy 12'; LeBel (yellow card) 68' (yellow-red card) 90'; Barrett (yellow card) 118'	Referee: Daniel Aloi

July 16	Virginia Beach United	2–1 (a.e.t.)	SC United Bantams	Virginia Beach Sportsplex; Virginia Beach, Virginia
8:00 PM EDT	Moody (yellow card) 53' (goal) 65'; Taylor (yellow card) 73'; Ruddy 112'; Titsis (yellow card) 112'; Tradatti (yellow card) 119'	Report	Sandeu (yellow card) 41'; Benedix 45+1'	Attendance: 300; Referee: Cade Brashear

=== Eastern Conference ===
July 19 Conference Quarterfinals	Salem City FC	2–2 (a.e.t.) (3–2 p)	Virginia Beach United	TowneBank Stadium; Newport News, Virginia
4:30 PM EDT	Mauro 8'; Hernandez 17'; Fontes (yellow card) 57'; Tricker (yellow card) 83'; Speel (yellow card) 120'	Report	Hermoso (yellow card) 32'; Phillips 59'; Moody (yellow card) 62'; Wayland 87'	Referee: Samuel Callender
	Penalties
	Penalty scored Penalty missed		Penalty scored Penalty missed

July 19 Conference Quarterfinals	Long Island Rough Riders	1–3	Vermont Green FC	Carey Stadium; Ocean City, New Jersey
5:00 PM EDT	Fleming 25'; D'Ippolito (yellow card) 64'; Prince (yellow card) 86'; Saramago (yellow card) 86'	Report 1 Report 2	Labovitz 38', 45', 90+3' (yellow card) 90+3'; Lockermann (yellow card) 51'; Castro (yellow card) 52'; Windschauer (yellow card) 84'; Pfeifer (yellow card) 84'; Pacella (yellow card) 86'	Attendance: 47; Referee: Devin Dragon

July 19 Conference Quarterfinals	Lionsbridge FC	2–1	Western Mass Pioneers	TowneBank Stadium; Newport News, Virginia
7:30 PM EDT	Baker (yellow card) 39'; Gonzalez (yellow card) 43'; Wyatt 53'; Chisolm (yellow card) 63' (goal) 90+'; Materazzi (yellow card) 90+'	Report	Jiana (yellow card) 16' (goal) 32'; Cersosimo (yellow card) 45+'; Oberrauch (yellow card) 63'; Rose (yellow card) 90+'	Referee: Joe Biava

July 19 Conference Quarterfinals	Ocean City Nor'easters	0–1	Seacoast United Phantoms	Carey Stadium; Ocean City, New Jersey
7:30 PM EDT	Fala (yellow card) 83'; Widiez (yellow card) 90'	Report	Bertos (yellow card) 29'; Healy (yellow card) 36'; Kushima (yellow card) 43'; Rodriguez 79'	Referee: Neil Barbulescu

July 21 Conference Semifinal	Seacoast United Phantoms	3–0	Vermont Green FC	Carey Stadium; Ocean City, New Jersey
7:00 PM EDT	Bertos (yellow card) 6'; Conde 70', 78'; Franciosa (yellow card) 87'; White 90'	Report	Bazini (yellow card) 5'; Layton (yellow card) 8'; Wickham (yellow card) 79'	Attendance: 77; Referee: Luke Bernstein

July 21 Conference Semifinal	Lionsbridge FC	2–0	Salem City FC	TowneBank Stadium; Newport News, Virginia
7:30 PM EDT	Materazzi (yellow card) 29'; Foster 45'; Chisolm 69'; N'goubou (yellow card) 71'; Winslow (yellow card) 78'; Jennings (yellow card) 90+4'	Report	Williams (yellow card) 20'; Mauro (yellow card) 45+2'; Chudley (red card) 73'	Referee: Otto Leon

July 26 Conference Final	Lionsbridge FC	3–6	Seacoast United Phantoms	TowneBank Stadium; Newport News, Virginia
7:30 PM EDT	Foster (yellow card) 3'; N'goubou 23'; Winslow 38'; Turner (yellow card) 58'; Krioutchenkov 76'; Lovett (yellow card) 90'	Report	Conde 9'; Makedika 31'; Rodriguez 42'; Dos Sontos 56' (yellow card) 62'; 78'; Jahn (yellow card) 82'; White 83'; Healy (yellow card) 90'	Referee: Joshua Pitt

=== Southern Conference ===
July 19 Conference Quarterfinals	Brave SC	2–1 (a.e.t.)	Sarasota Paradise	Buncombe County Sports Park Field 8 Asheville, North Carolina
3:00 PM EDT	Ferreira 18' (yellow card) 117'; Correia (yellow card) 58'; Deputat 98'; Carrera (yellow card) 104'	Report	Hollenback (yellow card) 21'; Nieto (yellow card) 31'; Mahlmeister 71' (pen.) (yellow card) 71'; Pierce (yellow card) 78'; Read (yellow card) 90+7'	Referee: Todd Adkison

July 19 Conference Quarterfinals	Corpus Christi FC	5–3 (a.e.t.)	Tennessee SC	War Memorial Stadium; Little Rock, Arkansas
4:00 PM CDT	Bozzo (yellow card) 33'; Porter 45'; Herrera (yellow card) 66'; Mase (yellow card) 69'; Abeal 89', 93', 114'; Fernandez (yellow card) 90'; Garcia 120'	Report	West 3' (yellow card) 45+2'; Lee 58'; Brown 90+2'	Referee: Damon Gilbert

July 19 Conference Quarterfinals	Asheville City SC	4–0	NONA FC	Buncombe County Sports Park Field 8 Asheville, North Carolina
7:30 PM EDT	Carlson 2', 58' (yellow card) 69'; Wong (yellow card) 52'; Rempel (yellow card) 56'; Tregarthon 84' (pen.); Vignali 88'	Report	Laryea (yellow card) 35'	Referee: Todd Adkison

July 19 Conference Quarterfinals	Little Rock Rangers	5–2	AHFC Royals	War Memorial Stadium; Little Rock, Arkansas
7:30 PM CDT	Fazzi 30'; Pereira (yellow card) 41'; Padilla 50'; Diaz 63' (pen.); Campisi 68'; Burko 75'; Wynne (yellow card) 90'	Report	Clarkson (yellow card) 3'; Cain 45'; Escobar-Bowie (yellow card) 54'; Burke 90'	Referee: Carson Alston

July 21 Conference Semifinal	Asheville City SC	2–1	Brave SC	Greenwood Field; Asheville, North Carolina
6:00 PM EDT	Wong (yellow card) 40'; Carlson (yellow card) 53'; Huckaby (yellow card) 59'; Navarro 73'; Tregarthen 78' (yellow card) 79'; Paikuli-Campbell (yellow card) 85'	Report	Diaz 30' (yellow card) 64'; Gallina (red card) 59'; Muench (yellow card) 88'; McManus (yellow card) 88'	Referee: Colin Ashley

July 21 Conference Semifinal	Little Rock Rangers	1–1 (a.e.t.) (4–5 p)	Corpus Christi FC	War Memorial Stadium; Little Rock, Arkansas
6:00 PM CDT	Campisi 5'; Gray (yellow card) 63'; McConnell (yellow card) 89'; Burko (yellow card) 107'; Garvey (yellow card) 113'	Report	Medina (yellow card) 45+3'; Garcia (yellow card) 57'; Villanueva (yellow card) 57'; Chandler (yellow card) 59'; Abeal 60'; Bozzo (yellow card) 115'	Referee: Albert Franklin
	Penalties
	Blake (penalty scored); McConnell (penalty scored); Pereira (penalty scored); Von Essen (penalty scored); Burko (penalty missed)		Penalty scored

July 26 Conference Final	Asheville City SC	1–0	Corpus Christi FC	TowneBank Stadium; Newport News, Virginia
4:30 PM EDT	Vignali 35'; Harper (yellow card) 85'; Magnusson (yellow card) 90'	Report	Fernandez (yellow card) 20'; Abeal (yellow card) 48'; Media (yellow card) 49'; Mase (yellow card) 81'	Referee: Cade Brashear

=== Central Conference ===
July 19 Conference Quarterfinals	Fort Wayne FC	0–0 (a.e.t.) (5–4 p)	Midwest United FC	Atwood Stadium; Flint, Michigan
4:00 PM EDT	Castro (yellow card) 17'; Schnaider (yellow card) 39'; Giwa-McNeil (yellow card) 42'; Anaya (yellow card) 45'; Dias (yellow card) 111'; Kino (yellow card) 118'	Report	White (yellow card) 22'; Ojutalayo (yellow card) 32'; Adamson (yellow card) 68'; De Bruin (yellow card) 90' (yellow-red card) 120'; Jones (yellow card) 97'	Attendance: 4,000; Referee: Evan Barnett
	Penalties
	Penalty scored Penalty missed		Penalty scored Penalty missed

July 19 Conference Quarterfinals	Des Moines Menace	2–0	Bavarian United SC	Shea Stadium; Peoria, Illinois
3:30 PM CDT	Padilla (yellow card) 7'; Govea (yellow card) 57' (goal) 83'; Ramadan (yellow card) 86'; Aboohamidi 90'	Report	Bilow (yellow card) 41'; Dryden (yellow card) 43'; Aoki (yellow card) 62'	Referee: Braeden Frey

July 19 Conference Quarterfinals	Flint City Bucks	1–0	Cleveland Force SC	Atwood Stadium; Flint, Michigan
7:30 PM EDT	Ault 75'	Report	Richards (yellow card) 44'	Referee: Meghan Brasseur

July 19 Conference Quarterfinals	Peoria City	2–0	Thunder Bay Chill	Shea Stadium; Peoria, Illinois
7:30 PM CDT	Reddy (yellow card) 8'; Coughlin (yellow card) 51'; Gomez 56'; Persenico 73'; Koulai (yellow card) 82'	Report		Attendance: 1,876; Referee: Nathan Frey

July 21 Conference Semifinal	Peoria City	5–5 (a.e.t.) (4–2 p)	Des Moines Menace	Shea Stadium; Peoria, Illinois
1:30 PM CDT	Wilson 22'; Coughlin (yellow card) 28'; Koulai 39'; Gibson (yellow card) 42'; Persenico 60' (pen.), 97' (yellow card) 60'; Reddy (yellow card) 71'; Paye (yellow card) 88'; Gomez (yellow card) 90'; Aremeyaw (yellow card) 90' (yellow-red card) 116'; Saraiva (yellow card) 105'; Sergiev (yellow card) 119'; Volmar 120'	Report	Mora 27'; Carvalho (yellow card) 57'; Hojbjerg (yellow card) 59'; Cunha (yellow card) 62'; Ramadan 70' (yellow card) 117'; Manduzio 78'; McKerrell (yellow card) 86'; Cisneros (yellow card) 104' (goal) 120'; Govea 114'	Attendance: 1,102; Referee: Steven Cowles
	Penalties
	Sergiev (penalty scored); Dickerson (penalty missed); Lyshoj (penalty scored); Saraiva (penalty scored); Sophanavong (penalty scored)		Penalty missed Penalty scored

July 21 Conference Semifinal	Flint City Bucks	2–1 (a.e.t.)	Fort Wayne FC	Atwood Stadium; Flint, Michigan
5:00 PM EDT	Mimy (yellow card) 18' (yellow-red card) 78' (goal) 26'; O'Riordan (yellow card) 45+2'; Doroh (yellow card) 78'; Fisher (yellow card) 105' (yellow-red card) 105'; Tarleton 115'; Grzesiak (yellow card) 118'	Report	Bley 37' (yellow card) 78'; Avery (yellow card) 78' (yellow-red card) 120'; O'Shaughnessy (yellow card) 78'; Traore (yellow card) 84'; Sanchez (yellow card) 105'; Lamaille (yellow card) 113'; de Castro (red card) 120'	Attendance: 3,000; Referee: Marcus Barnett

July 26 Conference Final	Peoria City	1–0	Flint City Bucks	Shea Stadium; Peoria, Illinois
7:30 PM CDT	Wilson (yellow card) 31'; Persenico 63'; Koulai (yellow card) 81'	Report	Gomez (yellow card) 43'	Attendance: 2,024; Referee: Ivan Burciaga

=== Western Conference ===
July 19 Conference Quarterfinals	Almaden FC	0–1	United PDX	Interbay Stadium; Seattle, Washington
2:00 PM PDT	Alvarez (yellow card) 41'	Report	Evans 54'	Referee: Christopher Turner

July 19 Conference Quarterfinals	Ballard FC	1–2	Project 51O	Interbay Stadium; Seattle, Washington
7:30 PM PDT	Hammond 28'; Alvarez (yellow card) 45'; Mejia (yellow card) 54'; Meyers (yellow card) 75'	Report	Wilkerson (yellow card) 25'; Duncan (yellow card) 47'; Esquivel (yellow card) 51'; Stone 83'; Sanchez 90+2'	Attendance: 1,500; Referee: Yannick Rothfuss

July 19 Conference Quarterfinals	Ventura County Fusion	2–1 (a.e.t.)	Albion SC Colorado	Kino North Stadium; Tucson, Arizona
5:00 PM MST	Serrano 51'; Atiye (yellow card) 66'; Costigan (yellow card) 79'; Goeling 105+2'; Lezzar (yellow card) 114'; Oladapo (yellow card) 120'	Report	Sevian 73'; Taubo (yellow card) 90+3'; Smith (yellow card) 113'	Referee: Mersha Kisiel

July 19 Conference Quarterfinals	FC Tucson	3–2	Flatirons FC	Kino North Stadium; Tucson, Arizona
7:30 PM MST	Canchilla (yellow card) 9'; Jones (yellow card) 51'; Belmudes 54'; Jennings 58'; Valencia (yellow card) 73'; Kawamura 90+7'	Report	Bosanko (yellow card) 3'; Elstad (yellow card) 39'; VanderVen (yellow card) 58' (goal) 90+10'; Boyle 85' (pen.)	Referee: Matthew Jacob

July 21 Conference Semifinal	Project 51O	5–4 (a.e.t.)	United PDX	Interbay Stadium; Seattle, Washington
2:00 PM PDT	Huesa (yellow card) 18'; Elmasnaouy 25'; Vera (yellow card) 37'; Gordon (yellow card) 70'; Esquivel (yellow card) 81'; Duncan 86'; Roque (yellow card) 90+8' (goal) 100'; Alekseev (yellow card) 105'; Heisner 113'; Gonzalez 120' (yellow card) 120'; Heisner (yellow card) 120'	Report	Finn 11'; Mohamed (yellow card) 34'; Harris 61', 108'; Schnebly (yellow card) 104'; Evans (yellow card) 116'; McClellan (red card) 120'; Edelman 120'; Finn (yellow card) 120'	Referee: Christopher Calderon

July 21 Conference Semifinal	FC Tucson	1–0	Ventura County Fusion	Kino North Stadium; Tucson, Arizona
7:00 PM MDT	Canchila (yellow card) 29'; Walczyk 37'	Report	Goodman (yellow card) 12'; Relerford (yellow card) 74' (yellow-red card) 88'; Costigan (yellow card) 89'	Referee: Jaime Avila

July 26 Conference Final	Project 51O	1–2	FC Tucson	Shea Stadium; Peoria, Illinois
3:30 PM CDT	Esquivel (yellow card) 23'; Camier (yellow card) 27'; Elmasnaouy 42'; Martinez (yellow card) 62'; Alekseev (yellow card) 69'	Report	Walczyk (yellow card) 40'; Canchila (yellow card) 43'; Caliari 63'; Santos 88'	Referee: Joe Grooss

=== National Semifinals ===
July 28	Peoria City	5–1	FC Tucson	Shea Stadium; Peoria, Illinois
1:30 PM CDT	Persenico 49', 52', 67'; Coughlin 73'; Saraiva 88'	Report	Arnesen 53'	Attendance: 1,337; Referee: Igor Bych

July 28	Seacoast United Phantoms	1–0	Asheville City SC	TowneBank Stadium; Newport News, Virginia
7:00 PM EDT	Conde (yellow card) 44'; Nishikawa 70'	Report		Referee: Spencer Adamson

=== USL League Two Championship Game ===
August 3
7:30 PM CT

Peoria City	2–3 (a.e.t.)	Seacoast United Phantoms
Wilson 19'; W. Gibson (yellow card) 28'; T. Gibson (yellow card) 47'; Koulai 58'; Dickerson (yellow card) 90'; Sophanavong (yellow card) 109'; Gomez (yellow card) 120'	Report	Berlos (yellow card) 43'; Healy 49'; Rodriguez (yellow card) 52'; Makedika 63'; Strine (yellow card) 90'; Hersi 96'

Shea Stadium
Peoria, Illinois
Attendance: 3,102
Referee: Brian Alvarez

Championship MVP: (United States) Taig Healy (SUP)

== Awards ==
=== Monthly Awards ===
Team of the Month
Month	Goalkeeper	Defenders	Midfielders	Forwards	Ref.
May	(United States) Terranova (NCF)	(United States) Briscoe (BAL) (Chile) Bozzo (CRP) (United States) Shannon (MDU) (United States) Fernandez (TAC)	(Senegal) Ndiaye (VER) (Mexico) Castillo (MIA) (United States) Rivera (ALM)	(United States) Persenico (PEO) (Armenia) Kaloukian (CRS) (Uruguay) Tregarthan (ASH)	
June	(Poland) Wroblewski (LRR)	(United States) Jones (OCN) (England) Broughton (DMM) (Brazil) Andrade (BRA)	(New Zealand) Pierce (SAR) (United States) Evans (PDX) (United States) Healy (SUP) (United States) Wiersdorf (ALM)	(United States) Ault (FCB) (United States) Hughes (WMP) (Israel) Bazini (VER)	

=== Yearly Awards ===
Award	Winner	Team	Reason	Ref.
Golden Boot	(United States) Alec Hughes	Western Mass Pioneers	16 Goals in 13 games	
Golden Glove	(Poland) Tomasz Wroblewski	Little Rock Rangers	0.20 Goals Against Average; 9 Shutouts	
Coach of the Year	(England) Scott Wells	Asheville City SC	Led the team to an unbeaten 10-2-0 Record	
Young Player of the Year	(United States) Ethan Kelly	Monterey Bay FC II	four goals in nearly 700 minutes	
Defender of the Year	(United States) Josh Jones	Ocean City Nor'easters	5 goals, including a hat-trick against Philadelphia, broke the club’s single season goal scorer record for a defender	
Player of the Year	(United States) Alec Hughes	Western Mass Pioneers	16 Goals in 13 games	

Team of the Year
Player	Team	Position
(Poland) Tomasz Wroblewski	Little Rock Rangers	Goalkeeper
(Australia) Charlie Harper	Asheville City SC	Defender
(United States) Josh Jones	Ocean City Nor'easters	Defender
(United States) Christian Engmann	Ballard FC	Defender
(United States) Taig Healy	Seacoast United Phantoms	Midfielder
(United States) William Wiersdorf	Almaden FC	Midfielder
(United States) Cooper Flax	Manhattan SC	Midfielder
(Spain) Marc Torrellas	Des Moines Menace	Midfielder
(United States) Luke Persenico	Peoria City	Forward
(United States) Alec Hughes	Western Mass Pioneers	Forward
(Uruguay) Sebastian Tregarthen	Asheville City SC	Forward

Divisional Players of the Year
Division	Player	Team
Eastern Conference
Chesapeake	(United States) Ethan Taylor	Virginia Beach United
Metropolitan	(United States) Cooper Flax	Manhattan SC
Mid-Atlantic	(United States) Josh Jones	Ocean City Nor'easters
Northeast	(United States) Alec Hughes	Western Mass Pioneers
South Atlantic	(England) Jack Stainrod	SC United Bantams
Central Conference
Deep North	(Canada) Tyler Attardo	Thunder Bay Chill
Great Lakes	(United States) Palmer Ault	Flint City Bucks
Heartland	(United States) Luke Persenico	Peoria City
Valley	(Spain) Ander Castillo	FC Buffalo
Southern Conference
Lone Star	(Spain) Nacho Abeal	Corpus Christi FC
Mid South	(Poland) Tomasz Wroblewski	Little Rock Rangers
South Central	(Uruguay) Sebastian Tregarthen	Asheville City SC
South Florida	(New Zealand) William Pierce	Sarasota Paradise
Southeast	(Brazil) Matheus Ferreira	Brave SC
Western Conference
Mountain	(Japan) Daisuke Takanaka	Flatirons FC
Nor Cal	(United States) Ali Elmasnaouy	Project 51O
Northwest	(United States) Connor Evans	United PDX
Southwest	(Canada) Marley Edwards	Ventura County Fusion
