= Shea Stadium (disambiguation) =

Shea Stadium may refer to:

- Shea Stadium (short name for William A. Shea Municipal Stadium), an American ballpark in New York City; longtime home of the New York Mets Major League Baseball club
  - Mets–Willets Point station (LIRR), a seasonal-use station on the Long Island Rail Road's Port Washington Branch, formerly named Shea Stadium
  - Mets–Willets Point station (IRT Flushing Line), an elevated subway station on the IRT Flushing Line of the New York City Subway, formerly named Willets Point – Shea Stadium
- Shea Stadium (Peoria, Illinois), privately owned and managed facility; home of Bradley University soccer team
- Shea Stadium (Sacramento, California), home of the Sacramento State Hornets softball team
