= Bradley Braves =

Athletics teams of Bradley University, Illinois

- University: Bradley University
- NCAA: Division I
- Conference: Missouri Valley Conference
- Athletic director: Chris Reynolds
- Location: Peoria, Illinois
- Varsity teams: 15 (7 men's, 8 women's)
- Basketball arena: Carver Arena (men's); Renaissance Coliseum (men's and women's)
- Baseball stadium: Dozer Park
- Softball stadium: OSF Healthcare Field at Louisville Slugger Sports Complex
- Soccer stadium: Shea Stadium
- Other venues: The Clubs at River City; David Markin Tennis Courts; Detweiller Park; Newman Golf Course; WeaverRidge Golf Club
- Nickname: Braves
- Colors: Red and white
- Mascot: Kaboom! the Gargoyle
- Fight song: Charge On!
- Website: bradleybraves.com
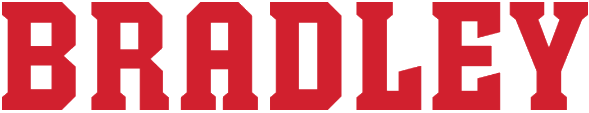

The Bradley Braves are the intercollegiate athletics teams of Bradley University, located in Peoria, Illinois, United States. The Braves' athletic program is a member of the Missouri Valley Conference (MVC) and competes at the NCAA Division I level. The Bradley mascot is Kaboom! the Gargoyle, and the school colors are red and white.

== Sports sponsored ==
Men's sports	Women's sports
Baseball	Basketball
Basketball	Cross country
Cross country	Golf
Golf	Softball
Soccer	Tennis
Track and field^{†}	Track and field^{†}
	Volleyball
† – Track and field includes both indoor and outdoor

Bradley Polytechnic Institute opened its doors in the fall of 1897, and the school fielded a football team in that first fall and a baseball team in the spring of 1898. Men's basketball debuted in 1902–03 with no coach and no home court, but was destined to become Bradley's most successful team; over the years, the Braves have played in 37 post-season tournaments, winning the National Invitation Tournament (NIT) four times and being runners-up in the NCAA and the NIT twice each and in the College Basketball Invitational (CBI) and CollegeInsider.com Postseason Tournament (CIT) once each.

A member of the Missouri Valley Conference, Bradley University sponsors teams in seven men's and eight women's NCAA sanctioned sports. Bradley is the only NCAA Division I school that sponsors men's but not women's soccer.

=== Men's basketball ===
Bradley is best known for its college basketball success. Bradley has been to nine NCAA tournaments, including two national championship games, three Elite 8s, and four Sweet 16s. Bradley has an overall NCAA Tournament record of 11–9.

Bradley has been to the NIT 23 times and won it four times. Their postseason NIT record is 27–20. Only one school (St. Johns, 27 times) has been to more NITs, or won it more times (St. John's, 6 times).

Years in NIT - 1938, 1939 (third), 1947, 1949 (fourth), 1950 (second), 1957 (won), 1958, 1959 (second), 1960 (won), 1962, 1964 (won), 1965, 1968, 1982 (won), 1985, 1994, 1995, 1997, 1999, 2001, 2007, 2023 and 2024

The Braves basketball squad was incidentally co-featured in a 1955 Sports Illustrated article focusing on their cheerleaders. The two-page spread, heavy with photographs taken at a tournament in New Orleans, Louisiana, keyed in on the enthusiasm and school spirit of the cheerleaders. Perhaps as irony, Bradley's basketball team, in action vs. Holy Cross, was shot as background for their avid supporters. Holy Cross defeated the Braves in this game, 89–81.

The Braves basketball team's current head coach is Brian Wardle. He became the program's 14th head coach in history in 2015 and led the Braves men's basketball team to the NCAA Tournament in 2019. This came as a surprise because the Braves finished 5th out of 10 teams in the Missouri Valley Conference in 2019. They finished with a 9-9 conference record but went on to win the conference tournament, giving the Braves the automatic bid to the NCAA Tournament.

=== Football ===
The Bradley football program was initiated in 1897, concomitant with the school's founding; three games were played by the fledgling squad, resulting in an 0–3 record. The Braves continued to field a gridiron team every year, with exception of the interruption of World War II (1943–1945), through the 1970 season. Upon the retirement of head coach Billy Stone, coupled with other considerations, the football program was at that point discontinued. The team played its games at Peoria Stadium.

== Facilities ==
- Baseball – Dozer Park
- Basketball (men's) – Carver Arena @ Peoria Civic Center
- Basketball (men's and women's) – Renaissance Coliseum
- Cross country – Detweiller Park and Newman Golf Course
- Golf – WeaverRidge Golf Club
- Soccer – Shea Stadium
- Softball – Petersen Hotels Field at the Louisville Slugger Sports Complex
- Tennis – The Clubs at River City (indoor) and David Markin Tennis Courts (outdoor)
- Track & field (indoor/outdoor) – no home facilities
- Volleyball – Renaissance Coliseum

== Braves in the pros ==
=== Basketball ===
- Chet Anderson
- Bob Carney
- Danny Granger, played basketball at Bradley; later transferred to New Mexico before playing in the NBA
- Hersey Hawkins
- Patrick O'Bryant
- Anthony Parker
- Roger Phegley
- Marcus Pollard, played basketball at Bradley; played football for his pro career
- Ray Ramsey, played basketball and football at Bradley; played two games in the BAA (now NBA) before fully committing to football for the rest of his career
- Chet Walker
- Voise Winters

=== Baseball ===
- Mike Dunne
- Mike Grace
- Lee Handley
- Guy Hoffman
- Jim Lindeman
- Brandon Magee
- Zach Monroe
- Kirby Puckett
- Bryan Rekar
- Rob Scahill
- Brian Shouse
- Mike Tauchman
- Bill Tuttle

=== Football ===
- Pat Brady
- Don Carothers
- Harry Jacobs
- Dick Jamieson
- Marcus Pollard
- Joe Prokop
- Ray Ramsey
- Billy Stone

=== Soccer ===
- Stephen Brust
- Salim Bullen
- Bryan Gaul
- Gavin Glinton
- Luke Kreamalmeyer
- Bryan Namoff
- Tim Regan

== Mascot History ==
Bradley University has gone through a couple mascot changes through its lengthy history as a school. Its athletic teams first started going by the Braves around the 1930s when famed athletic director and coach A.J. Robertson supported a name that separated them from schools who used 'Indians' instead. From then on the schools has kept the name Braves despite the mascot changes.

The school originally started out with a Native American mascot who donned the full costume and typical props. Going by 'Chief Bradley', the mascot stood side-by-side with a hawk mascot in the following years and went by 'Tommy Hawk'.

After students, faculty, and alumni started to plead with the university, and the NCAA started to crack down on Native American imagery, Bradley dropped all Native American-related merchandise and images from the school, including mascots and offensive logos in 1992. They then introduced a bobcat mascot. The mascot was not around for long as a connection to the university, and a lack of support led to its official demise in 2000 when the school dropped the bobcat.

From 2000 to 2014, Bradley had no mascot. That is until on February 22, 2014, Bradley officially introduced its new mascot: a Gargoyle named KaBoom!. The mascot represents the mythical creatures that sit atop Bradley Hall and now the Hayden-Clark Alumni Center as well. It was given the name KaBoom! after the iconic call that insinuates from Dave Snell, Bradley basketball's play-by-play announcer, after a dunk.

== Fan Zone ==
The Red Sea is the Bradley Athletics official student section. The Red Sea membership, currently, is $75 and it covers all four years the student attends Bradley. When you become a member you are able to receive tickets to every home men's basketball game, which are available to pick up during the organization's "Table Times" in Bradley's Student Center or at the Ticket Office located in the Renaissance Coliseum. For non-member students, they will have to pay a dollar. Members also receive a Red Sea T-shirt as well as other giveaways that occur throughout the school year. Only members get to attend pizza and poster parties where they can interact with the board members of the Red Sea as well as some athletes from various sports. Red Sea partners with the Student Activities Budget Review Committee every semester to get funded that allows the Red Sea to have multiple giveaways each semester. Members have the opportunity to join the executive board, which gives them a chance to communicate with the athletes and coaches to see how they can help each other for their upcoming season as well as provide ideas and designs for future giveaways. The Red Sea is part of, and in charge of, the Shea Brigade, at Shea Stadium, which was created in the spring semester of 2015. This is a student section, located behind the goal, for anyone who would like to cheer on the Bradley Braves soccer team.
