= 2017 Missouri Valley Conference men's soccer season =

Missouri Valley Conference
- Season: 2017
- NCAA tournament: Central Arkansas
- Matches: 103
- Goals: 182 (1.77 per match)
- Top goalscorer: 17 goals Niklas Brodacki (Central Arkansas)
- Biggest home win: Evansville 9–0 Anderson (08/25)
- Biggest away win: Central Arkansas 3–0 Fort Wayne @ Dayton (09/10); Valparaiso 5–2 @ Western Illinois (10/12); Loyola 3–0 @ Evansville (10/14)
- Highest scoring: Evansville 9–0 Anderson (08/25)
- Longest winning run: 7 games MissouriState (09/15–10/14)
- Longest unbeaten run: 7 games MissouriState (7–0–0) (09/15–10/14)
- Longest winless run: 7 games Central Arkansas (11/09/16–09/08)
- Longest losing run: 6 games Central Arkansas (08/25–09/08); Drake (11/09/16–09/13)
- Highest attendance: 3,506; Evansville @ Grand Canyon (09/07)
- Lowest attendance: 34; Loyola v Stetson @ NIU (09/10)
- Average attendance: 406
- All statistics correct as of October 31, 2017.

2017 Missouri Valley Conference men's soccer standings
	Conf.					Overall
Team	W		L		T	W		L		T
Missouri State	5	–	2	–	1	9	–	5	–	3
Central Arkansas ‡	5	–	3	–	0	9	–	11	–	1
Bradley	4	–	3	–	1	10	–	7	–	3
Evansville	3	–	4	–	1	11	–	8	–	2
Loyola Chicago	3	–	4	–	1	7	–	8	–	3
Valparaiso	3	–	5	–	0	8	–	9	–	1
Drake	2	–	4	–	2	6	–	10	–	2
‡ – 2017 MVC Tournament champion + – Invited to the 2017 NCAA Division I Men's Soccer Championship; As of November 17, 2017; Rankings from United Soccer Coaches

The 2017 Missouri Valley Conference men's soccer season was the 27th season of men's varsity soccer in the conference.

The Loyola Ramblers were the defending regular season champions, while the SIU Edwardsville Cougars (now in the Mid-American Conference) were the 2016 tournament champions.

With the results of the games of Saturday, October 28, Missouri State secured the top seed in the MVC Tournament with Central Arkansas seeded second. MoSt then won the regular season title with a draw at Drake on November 4.

On Sunday, November 12, the Central Arkansas Bears defeated the Missouri State Bears 1–0 in overtime at Shea Stadium in Peoria, Illinois to with their first MVC Championship and advance to their first NCAA tournament since moving to Division I in 2007.

== Changes from 2016 ==
The Valparaiso Crusaders joined the MVC on July 1 after spending the past ten years in the Horizon League. At the time, Valpo became the eighth team in MVC men's soccer.

The MVC lost SIU Edwardsville (SIUE) to the Mid-American Conference, returning the MVC to seven men's soccer teams. The Cougars had initially been announced as joining MAC men's soccer in 2018, but less than a week after the initial announcement, the MAC indicated that SIUE men's soccer would instead join in 2017.

== Teams ==
Team	Location	Stadium	Capacity	Head coach	Uniform supplier
Bradley Braves	Peoria, Illinois	Shea Stadium	3,800	(United States) Jim DeRose	(Germany) adidas
Central Arkansas Bears	Conway, Arkansas	Bill Stephens Track/Soccer Complex	300	(United States) Ross Duncan	(Germany) adidas
Drake Bulldogs	Des Moines, Iowa	Cownie Sports Complex	2,000	(Scotland) Gareth Smith	(Germany) adidas
Evansville Purple Aces	Evansville, Indiana	Arad McCutchan Stadium	2,500	(United States) Marshall Ray	(Germany) adidas
Loyola Ramblers	Chicago, Illinois	Loyola Soccer Park	500	(New Zealand) Neil Jones	(United States) Nike
Missouri State Bears	Springfield, Missouri	Robert W. Plaster Stadium	16,600	(United States) John Leamy	(Germany) adidas
Valparaiso Crusaders	Valparaiso, Indiana	Brown Field	5,000	(United States) Mike Avery	(United States) Nike

== Season outlook ==
2017 Preseason MVC Coaches' Poll

Rank	Team (1st-place votes)	Points
1	Loyola (5)	47
2	Evansville (1)	38
3	Missouri State (1)	34
4	Central Arkansas	30
5	Drake	18
6	Valparaiso	15
7	Bradley	14

2017 Preseason MVC All-Conference Team'

Player	School	Position	Class	Hometown (High school)
Zac Blaydes	Evansville	Junior	Forward	Midway, Kentucky (Woodford County)
Niklas Brodacki	Central Arkansas	Sophomore	Forward	Norrkoping, Sweden (IFK Norrkoping)
Elliot Collier †	Loyola	Forward	Junior	Hamilton, New Zealand (Saint Paul's Collegiate)
Steven Enna	Drake	Senior	Forward	Overland Park, Kansas (St. James Academy)
Ramone Howell	Valparaiso	Senior	Midfielder	Portmore, Jamaica (Jamaica College)
Alec Lasinski	Loyola	Junior	Forward	Ann Arbor, Michigan (Skyline)
Ian McGrath	Evansville	Senior	Midfielder	New Lenox, Illinois (Lincoln-Way West)
Marc Olsen	Central Arkansas	Sophomore	Goalkeeper	Copenhagen, Denmark (Brondby Gynamsium)
Richard Olson	Bradley	Senior	Forward	Park Ridge, Illinois (Maine South)
Grant Stoneman	Loyola	Junior	Defender	St. Charles, Illinois (Wheaton Academy)
Simon Waever	Evansville	Sophomore	Defender	Holte, Denmark (Skovlyskolen)

† = Also on 2016 Preseason MVC All-Conference Team

== Regular season ==
=== Rankings ===
==== United Soccer Coaches National Poll ====
Source =

Legend
Increase in ranking
Decrease in ranking
Not ranked previous week or no change in ranking

	Pre	Wk 1	Wk 2	Wk 3	Wk 4	Wk 5	Wk 6	Wk 7	Wk 8	Wk 9	Wk 10	Wk 11	Wk 12	Final
Bradley	—	—	—	—	—	—	—	—	—	—	—	—	—	—
Central Arkansas	—	—	—	—	—	—	—	—	—	—	—	—	—	—
Drake	—	—	—	—	—	—	—	—	—	—	—	—	—	—
Evansville	—	—	rv	—	—	—	—	—	—	—	—	—	—	—
Loyola	—	rv	—	—	—	—	—	—	—	—	—	—	—	—
Missouri State	—	—	—	—	—	—	—	rv	—	—	—	—	—	—
Valpo	—	—	—	—	—	—	—	—	—	—	—	—	—	—

==== West Region rankings ====
Source =

	Wk 1	Wk 2	Wk 3	Wk 4	Wk 5	Wk 6	Wk 7	Wk 8	Wk 9	Wk 10	Wk 11	Wk 12
Bradley	—	—	—	7	5	5	6	6	7	8	9	8
Central Arkansas	—	—	—	—	—	—	—	—	—	—	—	—
Drake	—	—	—	—	—	—	—	—	—	—	—	—
Evansville	9	7	7	6	7	6	7	—	—	—	7	7
Loyola	4	5	6	—	8	—	—	9	9	7	8	—
Missouri State	—	—	—	8	6	3	2	3	3	4	4	6
Valpo	—	9	10	9	—	—	8	8	8	9	—	—

==== NCAA RPI ====
Source =

	Wk 6	Wk 7	Wk 8	Wk 9	Wk 10	Wk 11	Wk 12	Final
Bradley	69	82	105	132	131	124	114	114
Central Arkansas	171	172	161	156	167	148	144	154
Drake	140	152	138	151	140	121	122	124
Evansville	52	76	75	101	114	83	78	75
Loyola	133	141	120	124	119	111	120	121
Missouri State	41	32	59	61	65	75	89	95
Valpo	177	150	141	162	161	163	164	164

=== MVC Players of the Week ===
Date	Offensive Player of the Week	Class	Position	School	Defensive Player of the Week	Class	Position	School
August 29	Ian McGrath	Senior	Midfielder	Evansville	Matthew Keller	Senior	Goalkeeper	Evansville
September 6	Rafael Mentzingen	Junior	Midfielder	Valparaiso	Nacho Miras	Sophomore	Goalkeeper	Valparaiso
September 12	Niklas Brodacki	Sophomore	Forward	Central Arkansas	Marius Kullmann	Sophomore	Defender	Loyola
September 19	Conor Ingram	Junior	Forward	Missouri State	Brandon Barnes	Senior	Goalkeeper	Bradley
September 26	Conor Ingram	Junior	Forward	Missouri State	Brandon Barnes	Senior	Goalkeeper	Bradley
October 3	Pepe San Roman	Senior	Midfielder	Central Arkansas	Brandon Barnes	Senior	Goalkeeper	Bradley
October 10	Rafael Mentzingen	Junior	Forward	Valparaiso	Liam Priestley	Senior	Goalkeeper	Missouri State
October 17	Elliot Collier	Senior	Forward	Loyola	Jake Bates	Freshman	Defender	Central Arkansas
October 24	Niklas Brodacki	Sophomore	Forward	Central Arkansas	Grant Stoneman	Junior	Defender	Loyola
October 31	Josh Dolling	Freshman	Forward	Missouri State	Caden McCullough	Freshman	Goalkeeper	Drake
November 7	Niklas Brodacki	Sophomore	Forward	Central Arkansas	Brandon Barnes	Senior	Goalkeeper	Bradley

== Postseason ==
=== MVC Tournament ===
The 2017 MVC Tournament was played November 7, 8, 10, and 12 at Bradley University's Shea Stadium in Peoria, Illinois.

Second seeded Central Arkansas defeated top-seeded Missouri State 1–0 in overtime to earn the MVC's automatic bid to the NCAA tournament.

=== NCAA tournament ===
Seed	Region	School	1st round	2nd round	3rd round	Quarterfinals	Semifinals	Championship
—	3	Central Arkansas Bears	@ Southern Methodist; Lost 2–0	—	—	—	—	—

=== 2018 MLS SuperDraft ===
Round	Pick #	MLS team	Player	Position	College	Other
3	49	Chicago Fire FC	(New Zealand) Elliot Collier	FW	Loyola Chicago	

== Honors ==
=== 2017 United Soccer Coaches NCAA Division I Men's All-West Region teams ===
Player	School	Position	Class	Hometown (High school/Previous college)
First Team
(England) Nick Burtenshaw	Missouri State	Defender	Senior	Hatfield Hertfordshire, England (The Harefield Academy)
(Sweden) Niklas Brodacki	Central Arkansas	Forward	Sophomore	Norrkoping, Sweden (IFK Norrkoping)
(United States) Ian McGrath	Evansville	Midfielder	Senior	New Lenox, Ill. (Lincoln-Way West)
Second Team
(Canada) Kyle Hiebert	Missouri State	Midfielder/Defender	Sophomore	La Salle, Manitoba, Canada (Glenlawn Collegiate School)
(Brazil) Rafael Mentzingen	Valparaiso	Midfielder	Junior	Rio de Janeiro, Brazil (Bryan)
(England) Liam Priestley	Missouri State	Goalkeeper	Senior	Essex, England (St. Thomas More)
(Denmark) Simon Waever	Evansville	Defender	Sophomore	Holte, Denmark (Skovlyskolen)
Third Team
(United States) Adan Garcia	Valparaiso	Forward	Sophomore	Dallas, Texas (Episcopal School of Dallas)
(England) Conor Ingram	Missouri State	Forward	Junior	Oxford, England (Fitzharrys School)
(Austria) Roman Schindler	Bradley	Forward	Sophomore	Vienna, Austria (BRG4 Waltergasse School/Indiana Tech)
(United States) Jacob Taylor	Bradley	Defender	Senior	Dunlap, Ill. (Dunlap)

=== 2017 CoSIDA Academic All-America teams ===
The six athletes named Academic All-Americans from the Missouri Valley Conference was the most from any of the 24 soccer playing conferences; the twelve team Atlantic Coast Conference was second with five members.

==== First team ====
Clark Emerson. Bradley University, 4.00, Business (Finance)

==== Second team ====
Aleksi Tuominen, Drake University, 4.00, Health Sciences

==== Third team ====
Liam Priestley, Missouri State University, 3.52, Finance

Kyle Hiebert, Missouri State University, 4.00, Accounting

Chris Holmes, University of Central Arkansas, 4.00, Health Services Administration

Ryan Merideth. Drake University. 3.86. Biochemistry & Molecular Biology

=== 2017 CoSIDA Academic All-District teams ===
Only All-District players are eligible for the Academic All-America ballot.

==== District 5 (IL, IN, MI, OH) ====
Clark Emerson. Bradley University, 4.00, Business (Finance)

==== District 6 (AR, IA, LA, MN, MO, MS, ND, SD, WI) ====
Liam Priestley, Missouri State University, 3.52, Finance

Kyle Hiebert, Missouri State University, 4.00, Accounting

Daltyn Knutson, University of Central Arkansas, 3.95, Finance

Aleksi Tuominen, Drake University, 4.00, Health Sciences

Chris Holmes, University of Central Arkansas, 4.00, Health Services Administration

Ryan Merideth. Drake University. 3.86. Biochemistry & Molecular Biology

=== 2017 NSCAA NCAA Division I Men's Scholar All-America teams ===
Position	Name	Class	School	Major	GPA	Hometown

=== NSCAA 2017-18 College Team Academic Award ===
The National Soccer Coaches Association of America (NSCAA) annually recognizes college and high school soccer programs that have excelled in the classroom by posting a team grade point average of 3.0 or higher. — of the MVC's seven teams were honored this year. The schools, their head coaches, and their team GPAs are:

—TBA—

=== 2017 MVC awards ===
Source=

2017 MVC Men's Soccer Individual Awards
Award	Recipient(s)
Player of the Year	Niklas Brodacki, Central Arkansas
Offensive Player of the Year	Niklas Brodacki, Central Arkansas
Defensive Player of the Year	Nick Burtenshaw, Missouri State
Goalkeeper of the Year	Liam Priestley, Missouri State
Freshman of the Year	Younes Dayekh, Bradley
Coaching Staff of the Year	Central Arkansas (Ross Duncan, Mitch McKay, Jordan Bates, Nick Doyle)
MVC Fair Play Award	Missouri State

=== 2017 MVC All-Conference First Team ===
Player	School	Position	Class	Hometown (High school/Previous college)
Liam Priestley	Missouri State	GK	Sr.	Essex, England (St. Thomas More)
Simon Waever#	Evansville	D	So.	Holte, Denmark (Skovlyskolen)
Grant Stoneman%	Loyola	D	Jr.	St. Charles, Ill. (Wheaton Academy/Wisconsin)
Nick Burtenshaw	Missouri State	D	Sr.	Hatfield Hertfordshire, England (The Harefield Academy)
Niklas Brodacki%	Central Arkansas	F	So.	Norrkoping, Sweden (IFK Norrkoping)
Conor Ingram	Missouri State	F	Jr.	Oxford, England (Fitzharrys School)
Pepe San Roman	Central Arkansas	M	Sr.	Madrid, Spain (I.E.S. Margarita Salas)
Ian McGrath+%	Evansville	M	Sr.	New Lenox, Ill. (Lincoln-Way West)
Elliot Collier%!*	Loyola	M	Sr.	Hamilton, New Zealand (St. Paul's Collegiate)
Kyle Thomson$*	Loyola	M	Sr.	Park Ridge, Ill. (Maine South)
Rafael Mentzingen	Valparaiso	M	Jr.	Rio de Janeiro, Brazil (Bryan)

- %First-team selection in 2016; $Second-team selection in 2016; #HM selection in 2016; *Second-team selection in 2015; +HM selection in 2015; ! Second-team selection in 2014

=== 2017 MVC All-Conference Second Team ===
Player	School	Position	Class	Hometown (High school/Previous college)
Brandon Barnes	Bradley	GK	Gr.	Cary, Ill. (Prairie Ridge/Seton Hall)
Jacob Taylor+	Bradley	D	Sr.	Dunlap, Ill. (Dunlap)
Mason Leonard	Drake	D	Sr.	Overland Park, Kan. (Blue Valley Northwest)
Ben Stroud	Missouri State	D	So.	Christchurch, New Zealand (Scots College)
Adan Garcia	Valparaiso	F	So.	Dallas, Texas (Episcopal School of Dallas)
Donald Benamna	Central Arkansas	F	Jr.	Bangui, Central Africa Republic & Silver Springs, Md. (Montgomery Blair/San Jacinto JC)
Fabian Lifka*#	Loyola	M	Jr.	Kelkhelm, Germany (Taunusgymnasium Koenigstein)
Ramone Howell	Valparaiso	M	Sr.	Portmore, Jamaica (Jamaica College)
Frank Bak+	Bradley	M	Jr.	Glenview, Ill. (Glenbrook South)
Younes Dayekh	Bradley	M	Fr.	Brentwood, Calif. (Heritage)
Chris Holmes	Central Arkansas	M	Jr.	Conway, Ark. (Little Rock Catholic)

- #HM selection in 2016; *Second-team selection in 2015; +HM selection in 2015

==== 2017 MVC All-Tournament Team ====
Source=

2017 Missouri Valley Conference Men's Soccer Tournament MVP–Niklas Brodacki, Central Arkansas

Player	School	Position
Niklas Brodacki	Central Arkansas	Forward
Nick Burtenshaw	Missouri State	Defender
Ian McGrath	Evansville	Midfielder
Rafael Mentzingen	Valparaiso	Midfielder
Liam Priestley	Missouri State	Goalkeeper
Tyler Ridener	Central Arkansas	Defender
Jordy Robins	Missouri State	Midfielder
Pepe San Roman	Central Arkansas	Midfielder
Blake Stricker	Central Arkansas	Defender
Jacob Taylor	Bradley	Defender
Jake Taylor	Drake	Defender
Kyle Thomson	Loyola	Midfielder
Simon Waever	Evansville	Defender
Gerit Wintermeyer	Bradley	Forward

==== 2017 MVC Men's Soccer Scholar-Athlete teams ====
Source=

The criteria for the All-MVC honor parallels the CoSIDA (College Sports Information Directors of America) standards for Academic All-America voting. Nominees must be starters or important reserves with at least a 3.20 cumulative grade-point average (on a 4.00 scale). Also, students must have participated in at least 75 percent of the regular-season matches or played in the league tournament. Student-athletes must have reached sophomore athletic and academic standing at their institution (true freshmen and redshirt freshmen are not eligible) and must have completed at least one full academic year at their institution.

Player	School	Class	GPA	Major
First Team
Zac Blaydes@	Evansville	Jr.	3.83	Exercise Science
Falk Dennert	Bradley	Sr.	3.86	International Business
Clark Emerson@#	Bradley	Sr	4.00	Finance
Kyle Hiebert	Missouri State	So.	4.00	Accounting
Chris Holmes%	Central Arkansas	Jr.	4.00	Health Services Administration
Colton Jackson	Central Arkansas	Sr.	4.00	Accounting
Matthew Keller	Evansville	Sr.	3.99	Accounting & Finance
Daltyn Knutson	Central Arkansas	Jr.	3.95	Finance
Ryan Merideth	Drake	Jr.	3.86	Molecular Biology
Ian McGrath@	Evansville	Sr.	3.35	Athletic Training
Liam Priestley%	Missouri State	Sr.	3.52	Finance
Jacob Taylor@	Bradley	Sr.	3.61	Mechanical Engineering
Jake Taylor	Drake	Gr.	4.00	MBA
Simon Waever	Evansville	So.	4.00	Business
Honorable Mention
Elliot Collier	Loyola	Sr.	3.37	Exercise Science
Alex Peterson	Drake	So.	3.95	Finance & Marketing

- @ = First Team in 2016; % = Honorable Mention in 2016; # = First Team in 2015
