= 2017 Missouri Valley Conference women's soccer tournament =

Women's soccer tournament for the Missouri Valley Conference

- Classification: Division I
- Teams: 6
- Matches: 5
- Attendance: 1,056
- Site: Betty and Bobby Allison South Stadium; Springfield, Missouri (Semifinals & Final)
- Champions: Missouri State (2nd title)
- Winning coach: Rob Brewer (2nd title)

2017 Missouri Valley Conference women's soccer standings
	Conf.						Overall
Team	W		L		T	PCT	W		L		T	PCT
Drake ‍†‍‍	6	–	0	–	1	.929	13	–	4	–	2	.737
Missouri State ‡^{y} ‍‍‍	4	–	2	–	1	.643	10	–	9	–	2	.524
Loyola Chicago ‍‍‍	4	–	3	–	0	.571	13	–	7	–	0	.650
Northern Iowa ‍‍‍	4	–	3	–	0	.571	14	–	5	–	1	.725
Illinois State ‍‍‍	3	–	4	–	0	.429	9	–	9	–	2	.500
Valparaiso ‍‍‍	3	–	4	–	0	.429	9	–	10	–	0	.474
Evansville ‍‍‍	2	–	5	–	0	.286	6	–	11	–	0	.353
Indiana State ‍‍‍	1	–	6	–	0	.143	6	–	10	–	1	.382
† – Conference champion ‡ – 2017 Missouri Valley Tournament champion y – Invited to the NCAA tournament As of November 11, 2017; Rankings from United Soccer Coaches Poll; Source:Missouri Valley Conference

The 2017 Missouri Valley Conference Women's Soccer Tournament was the postseason women's soccer tournament for the Missouri Valley Conference held from October 29 through November 5, 2017. The opening round matches of the tournament were held at campus sites, while the semifinals and final took place at Betty and Bobby Allison South Stadium in Springfield, Missouri. The six-team single-elimination tournament consisted of three rounds based on seeding from regular season conference play. The defending champions were the Illinois State Redbirds, but they were eliminated from the 2017 tournament with a 1–0 loss to the Northern Iowa Panthers in the opening round. The Missouri State Lady Bears won the tournament with a 1–0 win over Northern Iowa in the final. The conference tournament title was the second for the Missouri State women's soccer program, both of which have come under the direction of head coach Rob Brewer.

== Bracket ==
Opening Round; Sunday, Oct. 29
4	Northern Iowa	1
5	Illinois State	0
3	Loyola Chicago	2
6	Valparaiso	1

Semifinals; Friday, Nov. 3
1	Drake	0
4	Northern Iowa	2
2	Missouri State	1
3	Loyola Chicago	0

Final; Sunday, Nov. 5
4	Northern Iowa	0
2	Missouri State	1

== Schedule ==
=== Opening Round ===
October 29, 2017	#3 Loyola Chicago	2–1	#6 Valparaiso	Chicago, Illinois
1:00 p.m. CDT	Jenna Szczesny 34', 53'; Sienna Cruz (red card) 71'	Report	37' Cory Griffith	Stadium: Loyola Soccer Park; Attendance: 226; Referee: Joe Brice; Assistant referees: Renee Mejia; Justin Bell; Fourth official: Kyle Hannon

October 29, 2017	#4 Northern Iowa	1–0	#5 Illinois State	Cedar Falls, Iowa
1:00 p.m. CDT	Kelsey Yarrow 14'	Report		Stadium: Cedar Valley Soccer Complex; Attendance: 139; Referee: Trent Payne; Assistant referees: Christopher Civitate; Thomas McCullough

=== Semifinals ===
November 3, 2017	#1 Drake	0–2	#4 Northern Iowa	Springfield, Missouri
3:30 p.m. CDT		Report	31', 38' Brynell Yount	Stadium: Betty and Bobby Allison South Stadium; Attendance: 260; Referee: Andy Ellsworth; Assistant referees: Shane Kennard; Scottie Stiles

November 3, 2017	#2 Missouri State	1–0	#3 Loyola Chicago	Springfield, Missouri
6:00 p.m. CDT	Jordan Eickelman 5'	Report		Stadium: Betty and Bobby Allison South Stadium; Referee: David Henderson; Assistant referees: George Major; Jeff Pulley; Fourth official: Daniel Edwards

=== Final ===
November 5, 2017	#4 Northern Iowa	0–1	#2 Missouri State	Springfield, Missouri
1:00 p.m. CST		Report	8' Brooke Prondzinski	Stadium: Betty and Bobby Allison South Stadium; Attendance: 431; Referee: Elvis Mahmutovic; Assistant referees: Matthew Stein; Matthew Rodman; Fourth official: Andy Wilkinson

== Statistics ==
=== Goalscorers ===
2 Goals

- Jenna Szczesny - Loyola Chicago
- Brynell Yount - Northern Iowa

1 Goal

- Jordan Eickelman - Missouri State
- Cory Griffith - Valparaiso
- Brooke Prondzinski - Missouri State
- Kelsey Yarrow - Northern Iowa

== See also ==
- 2017 Missouri Valley Conference Men's Soccer Tournament
