= Peoria City =

Peoria City may refer to:

- Peoria, Arizona
- Peoria, Illinois
- City of Peoria Township, Peoria County, Illinois, sometimes called Peoria City Township
- Peoria City (soccer), a soccer team in USL League Two
