= Dozer Park =

Baseball stadium in Peoria, Illinois, US

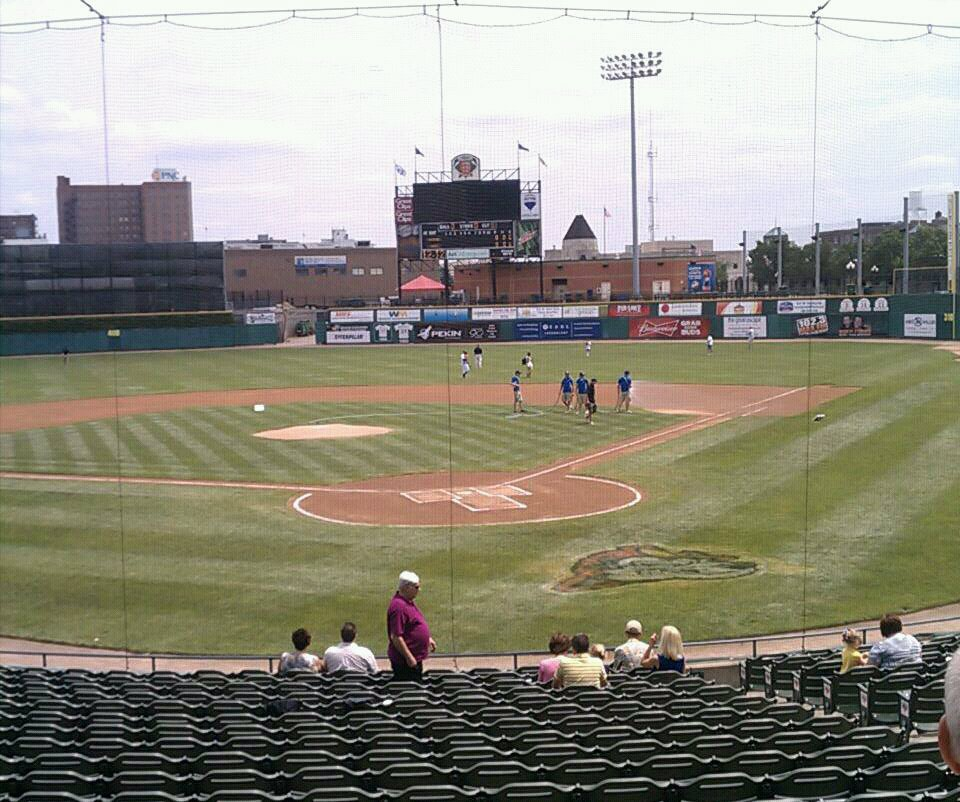

- Location within Illinois Location within the United States
- Former names: O'Brien Field (2002–2008); Chiefs Stadium (2009–2013)
- Location: 730 Southwest Jefferson Street; Peoria, IL 61605
- Coordinates: 40°41′15″N 89°35′51″W
- Owner: Peoria Chiefs Community Baseball LLC
- Operator: Peoria Chiefs Community Baseball LLC
- Capacity: 8,500
- Surface: Sod (1–1¼ inches)
- Record attendance: 8,825 (May 24, 2002 vs. Kane County Cougars)
- Field size: Left Field: 310 ft (94.49 m); Left Center: 375 ft (114.3 m); Center Field: 400 ft (121.92 m); Right Center: 375 ft (114.3 m); Right Field: 310 ft (94.49 m)
- Public transit: CityLink

Construction
- Groundbreaking: August 16, 2001
- Opened: May 24, 2002
- Renovated: 2023-2025
- Cost: $23 million ($41.2 million in 2025 dollars)
- Architect: HNTB
- Services engineer: Clark Engineers MW Inc.
- General contractor: River City Construction LLC
- Main contractor: Prairie Construction Systems Inc.

Tenants
- Peoria Chiefs (MWL) (2002–present); Bradley Braves (NCAA) (2002–present)

Dozer Park, originally O'Brien Field and then Chiefs Stadium, is a baseball stadium located in downtown Peoria, Illinois. It is the home of the Peoria Chiefs, the High-A affiliate of the St. Louis Cardinals in the Midwest League. The college baseball team of Bradley University, the Bradley Braves, also play their home games at Dozer Park. At 8,500 seats, Dozer Park has the ninth largest seating capacity of NCAA Division I baseball venues. It opened on May 24, 2002.

Dozer Park received a major renovation in 2023-2025, including $1 million for an entirely new playing surface installed after the 2025 season, with new dirt, sod and irrigation system. The ballpark also received new LED stadium lights, renovated clubhouses and dining areas for the teams, new weight rooms and training facilities, new lounge for players, new locker rooms for female umpires and staff, new batting cages in an inflatable structure beyond center field, and extended safety netting from foul pole to foul pole to protect fans and dugouts. The total cost of renovations was estimated at $3-$5 million to meet new standards from Major League Baseball.

== History ==
Official groundbreaking ceremonies for the $23 million multi-purpose stadium took place on August 16, 2001.

The Chiefs previously played at Meinen Field.

The stadium opened on May 24, 2002, as O'Brien Field, with a game between the Chiefs and the Kane County Cougars.

O'Brien Auto Team held the original naming rights to the facility.

In 2011, the stadium hosted the IHSA Class 1A and 2A baseball state finals. This was the first year the games were played at the facility.

In April 2013, the Chiefs, including the stadium, received $7.35 million in financing and debt forgiveness. The plan included forgiveness of $1.2 million in debt to the City of Peoria; $2 million in funding from Caterpillar Inc. for naming rights over 10 years; and $2.7 million in new investment of cash and equity by the Chiefs' ownership group of about 50.

On May 10, 2013, Caterpillar and the Chiefs announced that the stadium would be renamed "Dozer Park", a reference to Caterpillar bulldozers.

== The field ==
Dozer Park's sod has an 8-inch (200 mm) deep root zone of 90% sand and 10% Dakota peat for nutrition. The high concentration of sand naturally relieves soil compaction.

Beneath the sand and peat mix are 6 inches (150 mm) of gravel. Running through the gravel are drainage tiles that run from home plate to center field. A huge sump pump beyond center field then drains into the city sewer system.

The makeup of the pitcher's mound and batter's boxes are almost 100% clay because it packs better and is wear resistant. The rest of the infield skin area is around 40% clay, 30% silt and 20% sand.

The field will hold up to 5 inches (130 mm) of rain an hour.

The field is mowed every day during homestands, trimmed to 1–1 1/4 inches (25–32 mm) high. It takes 1.25 hours to cut the outfield grass 2 directions with a 100-inch (2.5 m) cut mower. A walk-behind mower is used for the infield.

The price tag for the field itself was around $450,000.

== Luxury suites ==
Dozer Park accommodates 20 luxury suites. Examples include:

- Peoria attorney Jay Janssen's suite — "A large, ornate Oriental rug covers most of the green-carpeted suite, which includes six candelabra wall sconces, a chandelier in the center, cherry wood cabinetry and chair rail, decorative border print, a green marble-topped table, a rose-colored granite pedestal bar overlooking the field and burgundy leather stools and chairs. In the kitchenette, a full-sized refrigerator is accompanied by a full-size oven and a sink with a chrome-plated faucet."
- Caterpillar, Inc. owns a double suite that is primarily used to entertain the customers and VIP guests the company hosts in the community.

== Food ==
Other than the five fixed concession stands, there are mobile carts around the park. The Chiefs' concessionaire is Professional Sports Catering.

== See also ==
- List of NCAA Division I baseball venues
