= 2026 Charleston Battery season =

Season of a professional football team

Charleston Battery
2026 season
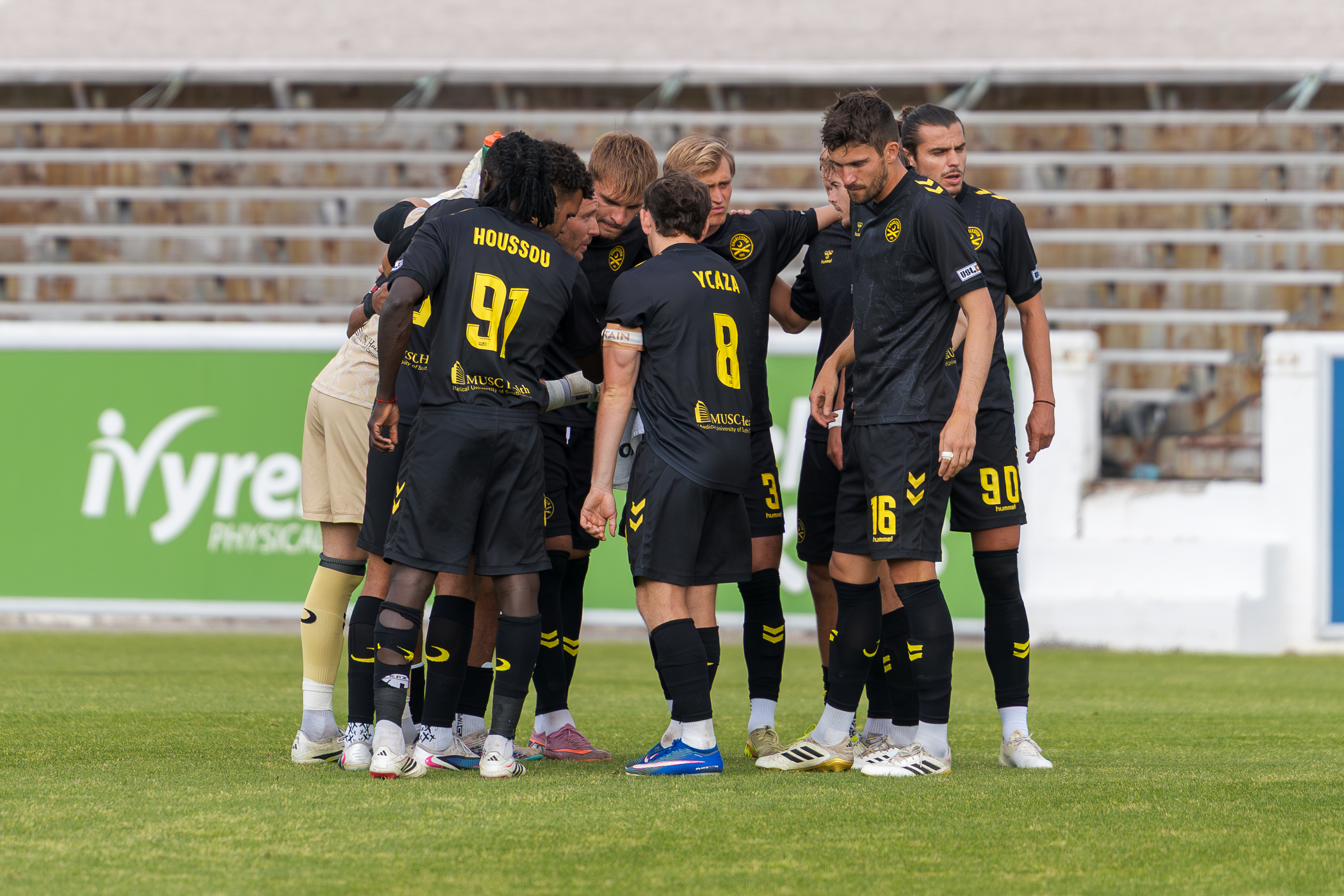
- President: Rob Salvatore
- Head coach: Ben Pirmann
- Stadium: Patriots Point Soccer Complex
- USL Championship: Conference: 2nd Overall: 2nd
- USL Playoffs: Conference Finals
- U.S. Open Cup: Second Round
- USL Cup: Group stage
- Top goalscorer: Colton Swan (10)
- Highest home attendance: 5,621 (October 24, against Indy Eleven)
- Lowest home attendance: League: 2,816 (September 2, against Hartford Athletic; 500 (March 18, against Florida Badgers FC)
- Average home league attendance: 4,121
Home colors	Away colors

The 2026 Charleston Battery season was the club's 36th year of existence and the Battery's 23nd season in the second tier of the United States soccer league system. It was their fifteenth season in the USL Championship (USLC) as part of the Eastern Conference.

== Season Squad ==
As of March 31, 2026

Note: Flags indicate national team as defined under FIFA eligibility rules; some limited exceptions apply. Players may hold more than one non-FIFA nationality.

No.	Pos.	Nation	Player
1	GK	USA	John Berner
2	DF	USA	Kruz Held
3	DF	USA	Nathan Messer
4	MF	ENG	Chris Allan
5	DF	USA	Sean Suber
7	DF	USA	Langston Blackstock
8	MF	USA	Emilio Ycaza
10	MF	CIV	Laurent Kissiedou
12	FW	USA	Alec Hughes
13	MF	COL	Wilmer Cabrera Jr.
16	DF	USA	Graham Smith
17	MF	USA	Jack Wayne

No.	Pos.	Nation	Player
22	DF	USA	Joey Akpunonu
24	GK	USA	Daniel Kuzemka
29	MF	USA	Jeremy Kelly
30	FW	USA	Colton Swan
42	FW	HON	Douglas Martínez
56	GK	USA	Luis Zamudio
88	MF	RUS	Kirill Pakhomov
90	FW	ESP	Miguel Berry
91	MF	CIV	Houssou Landry
98	GK	USA	Cohen Rigsby
99	FW	JAM	Maalique Foster

=== Out on loan ===
Note: Flags indicate national team as defined under FIFA eligibility rules; some limited exceptions apply. Players may hold more than one non-FIFA nationality.

No.	Pos.	Nation	Player
80	MF	COL	Juan David Torres (on loan to Sport Boys)

1. USL Academy Contract

== Competitions ==
All times in Eastern Time Zone.

=== USL Championship ===
==== Eastern Conference ====
Pos	Team	Pld	W	L	T	GF	GA	GD	Pts	Qualification
1	Tampa Bay Rowdies (S)	30	18	5	7	52	26	+26	61	Playoffs
2	Charleston Battery	30	16	9	5	56	35	+21	53	Playoffs
3	Detroit City FC	30	14	7	9	34	21	+13	51	Playoffs
4	Louisville City FC	30	13	9	8	51	43	+8	47	Playoffs
5	Pittsburgh Riverhounds SC	30	13	11	6	33	30	+3	45	Playoffs

Updated to match(es) played on October 24, 2026. Source: USL Championship Standings
Rules for classification: 1) total wins against conference opponents; 2) goal differential against conference opponents; 3) goals scored against conference opponents; 4) head-to-head points against conference opponents; 5) points per game against conference opponents; 6) points per game against non-conference opponents; 7) fewest disciplinary points; 8) coin toss or drawing of lots
(S) Players' Shield winner

==== Matches ====
On December 16, 2025, the USL Championship released the schedule for all 25 teams for both the regular season and the USL Cup.

March 7 1	Charleston Battery	2–1	Pittsburgh Riverhounds SC	Mount Pleasant, SC
6:00 PM	Suber 45+1'; Cabrera 52'	Report	Messer 62' (o.g.)	Stadium: Patriots Point Soccer Complex; Attendance: 5,012; Referee: Natalie Simon

March 21 2	Charleston Battery	3–2	Birmingham Legion FC	Mount Pleasant, SC
7:00 PM	Swan 58'; Ycaza 80' (pen.), 90+3'	Report	Williams 25'; Shashoua 27'	Stadium: Patriots Point Soccer Complex; Attendance: 3,945; Referee: Muhammad Kaleia

March 28 3	Detroit City FC	1–0	Charleston Battery	Hamtramck, Michigan
4:00 PM	Smith 75'	Report		Stadium: Keyworth Stadium; Attendance: 5,419; Referee: Greg Dopka

April 4 4	Louisville City FC	0–2	Charleston Battery	Louisville, Kentucky
4:00 PM		Report	Kissiedou 20'; Pakhomov 65'	Stadium: Lynn Family Stadium; Attendance: 7,297; Referee: Elvis Osmanovic

April 11 5	Brooklyn FC	3–0	Charleston Battery	Brooklyn, New York
7:00 PM	Servania 9'; Stojanovic 32'; Anderson 61'	Report		Stadium: Maimonides Park; Attendance: 2,736; Referee: Brad Jensen

April 18 6	Charleston Battery	1–1	Tampa Bay Rowdies	Mount Pleasant, SC
4:00 PM	Martínez 82'	Report	Cruz 80'	Stadium: Patriots Point Soccer Complex; Attendance: 3,856; Referee: Joshua Encarnación

April 22 7	Rhode Island FC	4–0	Charleston Battery	Pawtucket, Rhode Island
7:30 PM	Williams 51', 66'; Kwizera 61'; Atkinson 83' (pen.)	Report		Stadium: Centreville Bank Stadium; Attendance: 5,708; Referee: Elton García

May 2 8	Charleston Battery	4–0	Sporting Club Jacksonville	Mount Pleasant, SC
7:00 PM	Swan 28', 64'; Foster 32'; Pakhomov 42'	Report	Rose (red card) 18'	Stadium: Patriots Point Soccer Complex; Attendance: 3,513; Referee: John Matto

May 23 9	New Mexico United	1–0	Charleston Battery	Albuquerque, New Mexico
9:00 PM	Keller 81'	Report		Stadium: Isotopes Park; Attendance: 8,513; Referee: Trevor Wiseman

May 30 10	Charleston Battery	2–0	Detroit City FC	Mount Pleasant, SC
6:00 PM	Swan 14'; Blackstock 16'; Berry (yellow card) 35'; Blackstock (yellow card) 45+1'; Ycaza (yellow card) 49'; Martínez (yellow card) 70'; Pakhomov (yellow card) 90+4'	Report	Ry. Williams (yellow card) 24'; Montgomery (yellow card) 75'	Stadium: Patriots Point Soccer Complex; Attendance: 4,223; Referee: Jeremy Scheer

June 10 11	Tampa Bay Rowdies	2–2	Charleston Battery	St. Petersburg, Florida
9:00 PM	Pérez 30'; Mattheus 90+1'	Report	Foster 55'; Swan 81'	Stadium: Al Lang Stadium; Attendance: 4,468; Referee: Elvis Osmanovic

June 13 12	Charleston Battery	5–1	FC Tulsa	Mt. Pleasant, South Carolina
7:30 PM	Swan 16'; Foster 18'; Ycaza 45+1'; Cabrera 80'; Allan 90+3'	Report	Cabral 15'	Stadium: Patriots Point Soccer Complex; Attendance: 3,179; Referee: Alyssa Pennington

June 20 13	Sporting Club Jacksonville	2–5	Charleston Battery	Jacksonville, Florida
7:00 PM	Kuzain 44', 47'; Edwards (yellow card) 59' (yellow-red card) 81'	Report	Foster 12'; Kelly 14'; Berry 19', 53'; Hughes 82'	Stadium: Hodges Stadium; Attendance: 446; Referee: Muhammad Hassan

June 24 14	Charleston Battery	4–1	Loudoun United FC	Mount Pleasant, SC
7:00 PM	Foster 14'; Swan 41'; Ycaza 51' (pen.); Kelly 86'	Report	Piras 81'	Stadium: Patriots Point Soccer Complex; Attendance: 3,246; Referee: Kevin Broadley

July 4 15	Indy Eleven	2–0	Charleston Battery	Indianapolis, Indiana
4:00 PM	O'Brien 82'; Rendón 90+4'	Report	Smith (red card) 68'	Stadium: Carroll Stadium; Attendance: 8,143; Referee: Matthew Thompson

July 18 16	Charleston Battery	1–1	Sacramento Republic FC	Mount Pleasant, SC
7:30 PM	Ycaza 73' (pen.)	Report	Ajago 48', (yellow card) 24' (yellow-red card) 75'	Stadium: Patriots Point Soccer Complex; Attendance: 4,047; Referee: Matthew Corrigan

July 25 17	Colorado Springs Switchbacks	2–1	Charleston Battery	Colorado Springs, Colorado
9:00 PM	Perez 56'; Fjeldberg 90+5'	Report	Cabrera 81'	Stadium: Weidner Field; Attendance: 6,437; Referee: Muhammad Kaleia

August 1 18	Charleston Battery	5–0	Brooklyn FC	Mount Pleasant, SC
7:30 PM	Cabrera 1'; Foster 43'; Kissiedou 54'; Berry 57'; Ycaza 90'; Kissiedou (red card) 79'	Report	McNamara (red card) 79'	Stadium: Patriots Point Soccer Complex; Attendance: 4,432; Referee: Joe Surgan

August 8 19	Loudoun United	0–1	Charleston Battery	Leesburg, Virginia
7:00 PM		Report	Blackstock 64'	Stadium: Segra Field; Attendance: 1,522; Referee: Robert Vincze

August 15 20	Pittsburgh Riverhounds SC	3–1	Charleston Battery	Pittsburgh, Pennsylvania
7:00 PM	Amann 2'; Griffin 16'; Souza 61'	Report	Martínez 18', (yellow card) 78' (yellow-red card) 81'	Stadium: Highmark Stadium; Attendance: 6,020; Referee: Nabil Bensalah

August 22 21	Charleston Battery	5–0	Miami FC	Mount Pleasant, SC
7:30 PM	Foster 19'; Berry 45+3', 47'; Smith 62'; Hughes 86'	Report	Milanés (red card) 35'	Stadium: Patriots Point Soccer Complex; Attendance: 4,638; Referee: Brad Jensen; Assistant referees: Kevin Broadley

August 29 22	Las Vegas Lights FC	0–2	Charleston Battery	Las Vegas, Nevada
10:30 PM		Report	Foster 40', 59'	Stadium: Cashman Field; Attendance: 2,215; Referee: Brandon Stevis

September 2 23	Charleston Battery	1–2	Hartford Athletic	Mount Pleasant, SC
7:00 PM	Pakhomov 29'; Messer (yellow card) 18' (yellow-red card) 60'	Report	Ngalina 75' (pen.); Coffey 90+7'	Stadium: Patriots Point Soccer Complex; Attendance: 2,816; Referee: Erick Lezama

September 13 24	Birmingham Legion FC	2–2	Charleston Battery	Birmingham, Alabama
3:00 PM	Tregarthen 11'; Williams 39'	Report	Berry 14', 21'	Stadium: Protective Stadium; Attendance: 828; Referee: Edson Carvajal

September 19 25	Charleston Battery	1–0	Monterey Bay FC	Mount Pleasant, SC
7:00 PM	Sánchez 78'	Report		Stadium: Patriots Point Soccer Complex; Attendance: 4,373; Referee: Benjamin Meyer

September 26 26	Charleston Battery	2–0	Rhode Island FC	Mount Pleasant, SC
7:00 PM	Ycaza 77' (pen.), 84'	Report	Vegas (red card) 81'	Stadium: Patriots Point Soccer Complex; Attendance: 4,599; Referee: Brandon Stevis

October 3 27	Hartford Athletic	v	Charleston Battery	Hartford, Connecticut
7:00 PM		Report		Stadium: Trinity Health Stadium
Note: Rescheduled due to inclement weather.

October 10 28	Charleston Battery	0–2	Louisville City FC	Mount Pleasant, SC
4:00 PM		Report	Wilson 51'; Akale 88'	Stadium: Patriots Point Soccer Complex; Attendance: 4,316; Referee: Gerald Flores

October 14 27	Hartford Athletic	1–1	Charleston Battery	Hartford, Connecticut
7:00 PM	Williams 42'	Report	Njie 75' (o.g.)	Stadium: Trinity Health Stadium; Attendance: 2,457; Referee: Muhammad Hassan
Note: Rescheduled match that was due to be played on October 3.

October 17 29	Miami FC	1–2	Charleston Battery	Miami, Florida
7:00 PM	Al-Zubaidi 25'	Report	Swan 74'; Berry 77'	Stadium: Pitbull Stadium; Referee: Elton García

October 24 30	Charleston Battery	1–0	Indy Eleven	Mount Pleasant, SC
6:00 PM	Swan 78'	Report		Stadium: Patriots Point Soccer Complex; Attendance: 5,621; Referee: Joshua Encarnación

=== USL Championship playoffs ===
As the second seed in the Eastern Conference, the Battery qualified for the playoffs. In the conference quarter-finals, the Battery were matched up at home against Rhode Island FC, who had previously eliminated the Battery from the playoffs the past two seasons, whom after playing to a draw with a goal apiece, the Battery advanced to the conference semi-finals following a six round penalty kick shootout. During the conference semi-finals, at home again against Hartford Athletic, the Battery mounted a comeback after going down by three goals and being held scoreless until the 79th minute, eventually beating Hartford in the second penalty kick shootout of the playoffs for the Battery. The Battery's run in the playoffs eventually came to an end in the conference finals against Louisville City FC, where in a one goal shutout at home, the Battery's season came to an end.

October 30 Conference Quarter-finals	Charleston Battery	1–1 (a.e.t.) (5–4 p)	Rhode Island FC	Mount Pleasant, South Carolina
7:00 PM ET	Houssou (yellow card) 45'; Berry (yellow card) 45+1' (goal) 90+5'; Foster (yellow card) 51'; Ycaza (yellow card) 90+8'; Pirmann (yellow card) 95'; Zamudio (yellow card) 109'	Report	Kwizera (yellow card) 12' (goal) 28'; Bacharach (yellow card) 45+3'; Afonso (yellow card) 74'; Shapiro-Thompson (yellow card) 90+3'; Vegas (yellow card) 90'; Nodarse (yellow card) 120'	Stadium: Patriots Point Soccer Complex; Attendance: 3,530; Referee: Matthew Thompson
	Penalties
	Berry (penalty scored); Suber (penalty scored); Ycaza (penalty scored); Smith (penalty missed); Kissiedou (penalty scored); Kelly (penalty scored)		(penalty scored) Kwizera; (penalty scored) Tsukada; (penalty scored) Yao; (penalty missed) Bacharach; (penalty scored) Vegas; (penalty missed) Rodríguez

November 7 Conference Semi-finals	Charleston Battery	3–3 (a.e.t.) (5–4 p)	Hartford Athletic	Mount Pleasant, South Carolina
6:30 PM ET	Ycaza 79' (pen.); Swan 83'; Pakhomov 90+7' (yellow card) 90+8'; Smith (yellow card) 95'	Report	Ngalina 13'; Coffey 16'; Moreira (yellow card) 20'; Anaku 31'; Siaha (yellow card) 80'; Burke (yellow card) 88'	Stadium: Patriots Point Soccer Complex; Attendance: 5,228; Referee: Brandon Stevis
	Penalties
	Houssou (penalty scored); Berry (penalty scored); Pakhomov (penalty scored); Ycaza (penalty scored); Kelly (penalty scored)		(penalty scored) Presthus; (penalty scored) Scarlett; (penalty scored) Careaga; (penalty scored) Adedokun; (penalty missed) Williams

November 14 Conference Finals	Charleston Battery	0–2	Louisville City FC	Mount Pleasant, South Carolina
6:00 PM ET	Kissiedou (yellow card) 85'	Report	Serrano 9'; Perez 68'	Stadium: Patriots Point Soccer Complex; Attendance: 5,422; Referee: Nabil Bensalah

=== USL Cup ===
The Battery participated in the third edition of the USL Cup, and the second edition to feature teams from both the USL Championship and League One. Having gone undefeated in three matches heading into the final game, the Battery missed out on qualifying for the knockout stages after losing at home in a penalty shootout against fellow Carolinas-based club Charlotte Independence.

==== Standings ====
Pos	Lg	Team	Pld	W	PKW	PKL	L	GF	GA	GD	Pts	Qualification
1	USL1	Charlotte Independence	4	2	2	0	0	6	4	+2	10	Advance to knockout stage
2	USLC	Charleston Battery	4	2	1	1	0	8	3	+5	9	
3	USLC	Pittsburgh Riverhounds SC	4	2	0	2	0	6	1	+5	8	
4	USL1	Greenville Triumph SC	4	1	0	0	3	4	7	−3	3	
5	USLC	Loudoun United FC	4	1	0	0	3	4	7	−3	3	

==== Matches ====
April 25, 2026	Loudoun United FC	1–2	Charleston Battery	Leesburg, Virginia
6:00 PM EDT	Santos 27'	Report	Berry 16'; Smith 90+2'	Stadium: Segra Field; Attendance: 1,227; Referee: Deny Kulasinac

May 16, 2026	Richmond Kickers	0–4	Charleston Battery	Richmond, Virginia
7:00 PM EDT		Report	Blackstock 20'; Swan 40'; Berry 69'; Kelly 73'	Stadium: City Stadium; Attendance: 4,881; Referee: Benjamin Meyer

June 6, 2026	Charleston Battery	0–0 (4–2 p)	Pittsburgh Riverhounds SC	Mount Pleasant, South Carolina
7:00 PM EDT		Report		Stadium: Patriots Point; Attendance: 4,475; Referee: Rodrigo Albuquerque
	Penalties
	Suber (penalty scored); Berry (penalty scored); Pakmohov (penalty scored); Akpunonu (penalty scored)		(penalty scored) Mertz; (penalty scored) Wälti; (penalty missed) Garcia; (penalty missed) Flowers-Gamboa

July 11, 2026	Charleston Battery	2–2 (2–4 p)	Charlotte Independence	Mount Pleasant, South Carolina
7:30 PM EDT	Foster 27'; Swan 59'	Report	Bakero 37'; Marou 53'	Stadium: Patriots Point; Attendance: 3,002; Referee: Mario Maric
	Penalties
	Suber (penalty scored); Ycaza (penalty scored)		(penalty scored) Saydee; (penalty scored) Romero; (penalty scored) Marou; (penalty scored) Amaya

=== U.S. Open Cup ===
The Battery, as a member of the second division USL Championship, entered the 2026 U.S. Open Cup in the First Round, matched up at home against amateur United Premier Soccer League club Florida Badgers FC. After a game-winning goal in the twelfth minute of added time, the Battery were paired up in the second round away against fellow Carolinas-based club Charlotte Independence, a member of third-division league USL League One, whom ultimately the Battery fell to in added extra time.

March 18 First Round	(South Carolina) Charleston Battery (USLC)	2–1	Florida Badgers FC (UPSL)	Mount Pleasant, South Carolina
6:30 PM ET	Swan 21', 90+12'	Report	Altidor 66'	Stadium: Patriots Point Soccer Complex; Attendance: 500; Referee: Tiago Don Santos

March 31 Second Round	Charlotte Independence (USL1) (North Carolina)	3–2	(South Carolina) Charleston Battery (USLC)	Matthews, North Carolina
7:30 p.m. ET	Marou 37'; Álvarez 58'; Ortiz 118'	Report	Houssou 70'; Foester 77'	Stadium: Sportsplex at Matthews; Referee: Kevin Broadley
