= Peoria City (soccer) =

- Full name: Peoria City
- Nickname: The Flying Carp
- Short name: PC
- Founded: 2020; 6 years ago
- Stadium: Shea Stadium; Peoria, Illinois
- Capacity: 3,800
- Owners: Peoria City Soccer LLC. Josh Bellamy, Managing Partner
- Head Coach: Mike Paye
- League: USL League Two
- 2026: Central Conference runner-up
- Website: peoriacitysoccer.com
Home colours

Peoria City is an American soccer club from Peoria, Illinois, that plays in the Great Plains Division in USL League Two. The team's colors are Whiskey City Copper, black and Peoria City Red.

== History ==
The club was founded by former K–W United owner Barry MacLean along with John Dorn with then Franklin Pierce head coach Ruben Resendes serving as the inaugural head coach. The club was announced as a new expansion club, set to begin play in the 2020 season, however, their entrance was delayed to 2021, as the 2020 season was cancelled due to the COVID-19 pandemic. Their entrance was further delayed, with the team announcing in January 2022 that they would begin play in the 2022 season.

Peoria City played their first match on May 14, 2022, where a crowd of 1,114 were in attendance to watch a 2–2 draw against Minneapolis City SC. On July 15, Peoria City qualified for the USL League 2 playoffs with the second seed in the division after it won the head-to-head tiebreaker against the Thunder Bay Chill. The team lost 3–1 in the first round of the playoffs to Chicago FC United at Atwood Stadium in Flint, Michigan.

=== 2024 Season ===
In their third year, Peoria City went on a remarkable "Cinderella run" finishing the season with a record of 12-4-5 after winning four straight playoff games. Peoria was chosen to host the USL2 National Championship game which drew a record crowd of over 3,100 people. Peoria lost in the Championship final 3-2 to Seacoast United, to claim the National Runner-up.

== Club culture ==
The team's first supporters group is "The 309", named for the local 309 area code, which organizes fans at matches and pre-game events. Games feature a family friendly atmosphere complete with food trucks, tailgating and unique entertainment at various games.

== Honors ==
- USL League Two Central Conference:
  - Winner (1): 2024

== Year by year ==
Year	Level	League	Reg. season	Playoffs	U.S. Open Cup
2022	4	USL League Two	2nd, Deep North	Conference Quarterfinals	did not qualify
2023	4	USL League Two	3rd, Heartland	did not qualify	did not qualify
2024	4	USL League Two	2nd, Heartland	National Championship Game - Runner-up	did not qualify
2025	4	USL League Two	2nd, Great Plains	Conference Quarterfinals	did not qualify
2026	4	USL League Two	1st, Great Plains	Conference Finals	did not qualify

== Attendances ==
Attendance stats are calculated by averaging each team's self-reported home attendances from Peoria City Record Book https://peoriacitysoccer.com/wp-content/uploads/Records-Book.pdf

- 2022: 800
- 2023: 1,200 or 1,158
- 2024: 1,512 Playoffs: 1,888 Friendlies: 2,068 Overall without Friendlies: 1,683 Overall with Friendlies: 1,766
- 2025: 1,515 Friendlies: 1,166 Overall: 1,375
- 2026:
