= Shea Stadium (Peoria, Illinois) =

Soccer stadium and former baseball stadium in Peoria, Illinois

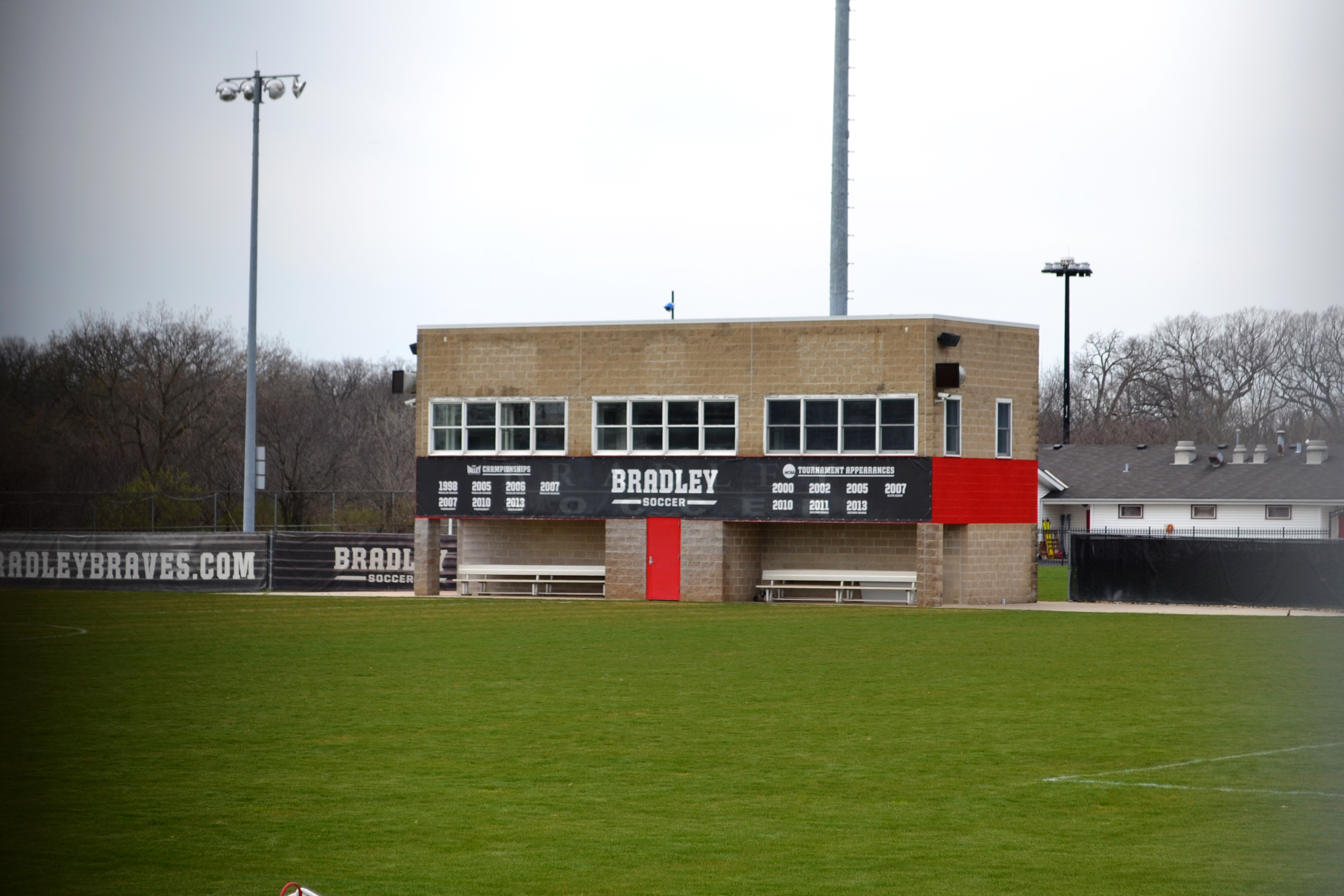
- Shea Stadium, 2024
- Interactive map of Shea Stadium
- Former names: Meinen Field (1970–1992); Vonachen Stadium (1992–2002)
- Location: 1523 W. Nebraska Ave., Peoria, Illinois
- Coordinates: 40°42′35″N 89°37′6″W
- Owner: Bradley University
- Operator: Bradley University
- Capacity: 3,800
- Surface: Grass
- Public transit: CityLink

Construction
- Groundbreaking: 1968
- Opened: 1970
- Renovated: 1982, 1992, 2002

Tenants
- Bradley Braves (NCAA); Baseball (1970–2001); Soccer (2003–present); Peoria Suns/Chiefs (MWL) (1983–2001); Peoria City (USL2) (2022–)

Shea Stadium is a soccer stadium in Peoria, Illinois, less than a mile north of Bradley University and just to the west of the USDA National Center for Agricultural Utilization Research. Converted from a baseball stadium to soccer in 2003, it is owned and operated by Bradley University as home of the Bradley Braves men's and women's soccer teams.

== History ==
The property broke ground around 1968 and opened as a baseball facility in 1970 for Bradley Braves baseball. Its name was chosen to honor Bradley athletic director and baseball coach John "Dutch" Meinen. It served as the home field for Bradley baseball for 32 years, from 1970 to 2001, and the home field for the Peoria Chiefs from their first game on April 19, 1983, to 2001.

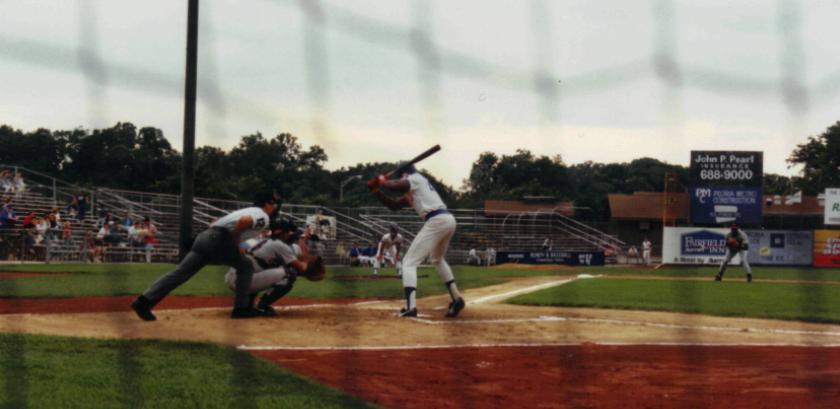
The Peoria Chiefs in action at the then-named Meinen Field in 1990

The baseball field was renovated twice: once in 1982, and once in 1992 when it was given a $2.2 million overhaul. The facility was renamed Pete Vonachen Stadium at Meinen Field on June 6, 1992, in honor of the Chiefs' owner.

After the baseball teams moved to O'Brien Field (now Dozer Park) for the 2002 season, the university began to look for other uses for Meinen Field, eventually settling on its current setup as a soccer-only facility. It was substantially reconfigured, with a few remnants of its baseball days remaining: the old press box; most of the first-base seating area, which now forms the main seating area for the soccer field; some of the light standards; and the concession stands and some other outbuildings on the property.

On October 25, 2002, Meinen Field was renamed Shea Stadium after Tim Shea, a Bradley University alumnus. The first Bradley soccer game at the newly renovated Shea Stadium was in August 2003.

On June 10, 2008, Shea Stadium played host to two Major League Soccer teams in a U.S. Open Cup qualifier when the Chicago Fire played against the Columbus Crew in front 3,829 people, the largest crowd ever to see a soccer game at Shea Stadium.

On January 23, 2020, the USL League Two announced that Peoria City would start play in the 2020 season in the Hartland Division of the Central conference, but the season was cancelled due to the COVID-19 pandemic. Peoria City, after two years of delay, began play in the Deep North Division of the Central conference. Their first game was on May 14 at Shea against Minneapolis SC Which ended in a 2-2 draw.

== See also ==
- O'Brien Field
