= 2019 USL League Two season =

USL League Two
- Season: 2019
- Champion: Flint City Bucks (4th Title)
- Regular Season Champions: Des Moines Menace (4th Title)
- 2020 Hank Steinbrecher Cup qualifier: Reading United AC
- 2020 U.S. Open Cup qualifiers: List: Chicago FC United Corpus Christi FC Des Moines Menace FC Golden State Force GPS Portland Phoenix North Carolina Fusion U23 SC United Bantams Tormenta FC 2 The Villages SC Ventura County Fusion Western Mass Pioneers
- Matches: 495
- Goals: 1,657 (3.35 per match)
- Best player: (England) Deri Corfe Ocean City Nor'easters
- Top goalscorer: (England) Deri Corfe Ocean City Nor'easters, (Saint Vincent and the Grenadines) Kyle Edwards Brazos Valley Cavalry F.C. (14 Goals Each)
- Best goalkeeper: (United States) Blake Mullen Western Mass Pioneers
- Biggest home win: NYR 6, EVG 0 (May 18); MIS 7, TXU 1 (May 18)
- Biggest away win: CCH 1, BVC 8 (June 1); BLR 1, MAN 8 (June 22)
- Highest scoring: TOB 7, TCO 3 (July 13)
- Longest winning run: 8 games Brazos Valley Cavalry F.C. (May 11 - June 25)
- Longest unbeaten run: 15 games (entire regular season + first round playoffs); Brazos Valley Cavalry F.C. Des Moines Menace; Western Mass Pioneers
- Longest winless run: 14 games (entire regular season); Evergreen FC; West Virginia Alliance FC; WSA Winnipeg
- Longest losing run: 8 games WSA Winnipeg (June 8 – July 8)
- All statistics correct as of August 3, 2019.

The 2019 USL League Two season was the 25th season of what was formerly the Premier Development League, and the first under the new League Two brand. The regular season started on May 3 and ended on July 14, consisting of 72 teams playing across 11 divisions. The Flint City Bucks won the championship, defeating Reading United AC 1–0 in extra time.

== Changes from 2018 ==
=== New teams ===
A total of 12 new member clubs join League Two for the 2019 season.

Team	Country	City/area	Stadium	Founded	Head coach	Notes
Cedar Stars Rush	U.S.	Teaneck, New Jersey	Fairleigh Dickinson University	2018	Anthony Nixon	Expansion
Dalton Red Wolves SC	U.S.	Dalton, Georgia	David Stanton Field	2018	Drew Courtney	Expansion
Daytona SC	U.S.	Daytona Beach, Florida	Daytona Stadium	2019	Andrea Bergmann	Expansion
Discoveries SC	U.S.	Rock Hill, South Carolina	Manchester Meadows Soccer Complex	2019	Nathan Williams	Expansion
Florida Elite SA	U.S.	Jacksonville, Florida	Bartram Trail High School	2014	TBD	Expansion
Green Bay Voyageurs FC	U.S.	Ashwaubenon, Wisconsin	Capital Credit Union Park	2018	Brian Kamler	Expansion
Manhattan SC	U.S.	Bronx, New York	Gaelic Park; Randall's Island	2018	Colin Hodge	Expansion
Park City Red Wolves SC	U.S.	Park City, Utah	Dozier Field	2018	Patrick Rennie	Expansion
Tormenta FC 2	U.S.	Statesboro, Georgia	Eagle Field	2016	Ian Cameron	Expansion
Sarasota Metropolis FC	U.S.	Sarasota, Florida	Robert L. Taylor Community Complex	2019	Massimo Marazzina	Expansion
Virginia Beach United FC	U.S.	Virginia Beach, Virginia	Virginia Beach Sportsplex	2019	Matt Ellinger	Expansion
Wake FC	U.S.	Holly Springs, North Carolina	Ting Park	2019	Gary Heale	Expansion

=== Moves ===
- Michigan Bucks became Flint City Bucks after moving from Pontiac MI, to Flint MI.

=== Name changes ===
- North County United renamed Treasure Coast Tritons
- West Virginia Chaos renamed West Virginia Alliance FC
- Carolina Dynamo renamed North Carolina Fusion U-23

=== On hiatus ===
- Fresno FC U-23

=== Folded / left ===
- Birmingham Hammers (disbanded to make way for Birmingham Legion FC in USL Championship)
- Colorado Rapids U-23
- Derby City Rovers
- FC Cleburne
- FC Tucson (moved to USL League One)
- IMG Academy Bradenton
- Lansing United (disbanded to make way for Lansing Ignite FC in USL League One)
- Memphis City FC (disbanded to make way for Memphis 901 FC in USL Championship)
- Myrtle Beach Mutiny
- Next Academy Palm Beach
- OKC Energy U23
- South Georgia Tormenta FC (moved to USL League One, replaced by Tormenta FC 2)
- SIMA Aguilas

== Standings ==
=== Eastern Conference ===
==== Northeast Division ====
Pos	Team	Pld	W	L	T	GF	GA	GD	Pts	Qualification
1	Western Mass Pioneers	14	11	0	3	31	7	+24	36	Eastern Conference playoffs
2	GPS Portland Phoenix	14	9	3	2	29	20	+9	29	Eastern Conference playoffs
3	Manhattan SC	14	8	6	0	33	20	+13	24	
4	Boston Bolts	14	5	7	2	23	28	−5	17	
5	Black Rock FC	14	5	8	1	23	34	−11	16	
6	Seacoast United Phantoms	14	4	7	3	19	31	−12	15	
7	Westchester Flames	14	3	7	4	25	32	−7	13	
8	AC Connecticut	14	2	9	3	21	32	−11	9	

Source: 2019 USL League Two standings
Rules for classification: 1) head-to-head record; 2) total wins; 3) total goal differential; 4) total goals scored; 5) record against the smallest group; 6) points earned against top four conference finishers; 7) point percentage outside smallest group; 8) disciplinary points; 9) coin toss or drawing of lots

==== Mid Atlantic Division ====
Pos	Team	Pld	W	L	T	GF	GA	GD	Pts	Qualification
1	Reading United AC	14	10	1	3	32	13	+19	33	Eastern Conference playoffs
2	Ocean City Nor'easters	14	6	3	5	27	22	+5	23 (Note: Ocean City Nor'easters wins the tiebreaker over Long Island Rough Riders on head-to-head points. (4-1))	
3	Long Island Rough Riders	14	5	1	8	22	14	+8	23	
4	New York Red Bulls U-23	14	5	3	6	26	18	+8	21	
5	Cedar Stars Rush	14	4	6	4	16	20	−4	16	
6	Lehigh Valley United	14	4	7	3	21	30	−9	15	
7	F.A. Euro	14	2	7	5	16	25	−9	11	
8	Evergreen FC	14	0	8	6	11	29	−18	6	

Source: 2019 USL League Two standings
Rules for classification: 1) head-to-head record; 2) total wins; 3) total goal differential; 4) total goals scored; 5) record against the smallest group; 6) points earned against top four conference finishers; 7) point percentage outside smallest group; 8) disciplinary points; 9) coin toss or drawing of lots

==== South Atlantic Division ====
Pos	Team	Pld	W	L	T	GF	GA	GD	Pts	Qualification
1	North Carolina Fusion U23	14	8	4	2	24	18	+6	26	Eastern Conference playoffs
2	North Carolina FC U23	14	8	6	0	21	19	+2	24	
3	Virginia Beach United FC	14	6	6	2	22	22	0	20	
4	Tri-Cities Otters	14	5	5	4	28	28	0	19	
5	Lionsbridge FC	14	5	6	3	26	24	+2	18	
6	Tobacco Road FC	14	5	7	2	29	29	0	17	
7	Wake FC	14	4	7	3	12	22	−10	15	

Source: 2019 USL League Two standings
Rules for classification: 1) head-to-head record; 2) total wins; 3) total goal differential; 4) total goals scored; 5) record against the smallest group; 6) points earned against top four conference finishers; 7) point percentage outside smallest group; 8) disciplinary points; 9) coin toss or drawing of lots

=== Southern Conference ===
==== Deep South Division ====
Pos	Team	Pld	W	L	T	GF	GA	GD	Pts	Qualification
1	Tormenta FC 2	14	10	2	2	33	11	+22	32	Southern Conference playoffs
2	SC United Bantams	14	9	3	2	22	15	+7	29	Southern Conference playoffs
3	Dalton Red Wolves SC	14	7	6	1	30	24	+6	22	
4	Charlotte Eagles	14	5	4	5	24	29	−5	20	
5	Discoveries SC	14	3	10	1	11	25	−14	10	
6	Peachtree City MOBA	14	2	11	1	11	27	−16	7	

Source: 2019 USL League Two standings
Rules for classification: 1) head-to-head record; 2) total wins; 3) total goal differential; 4) total goals scored; 5) record against the smallest group; 6) points earned against top four conference finishers; 7) point percentage outside smallest group; 8) disciplinary points; 9) coin toss or drawing of lots

==== Southeast Division ====
Pos	Team	Pld	W	L	T	GF	GA	GD	Pts	Qualification
1	The Villages SC	14	9	1	4	32	13	+19	31	Southern Conference playoffs
2	Treasure Coast Tritons	14	8	4	2	27	14	+13	26	
3	Daytona SC	14	7	3	4	13	10	+3	25	
4	Florida Elite SA	14	7	4	3	25	17	+8	24	
5	FC Miami City	14	5	5	4	24	24	0	19	
6	Lakeland Tropics	14	4	7	3	23	29	−6	15	
7	Sarasota Metropolis FC	14	4	8	2	22	27	−5	14	
8	Weston FC	14	1	13	0	9	41	−32	3	

Source: 2019 USL League Two standings
Rules for classification: 1) head-to-head record; 2) total wins; 3) total goal differential; 4) total goals scored; 5) record against the smallest group; 6) points earned against top four conference finishers; 7) point percentage outside smallest group; 8) disciplinary points; 9) coin toss or drawing of lots

==== Mid South Division ====
Pos	Team	Pld	W	L	T	GF	GA	GD	Pts	Qualification
1	Brazos Valley Cavalry F.C.	14	10	0	4	51	14	+37	34	Southern Conference playoffs
2	Corpus Christi FC	14	8	4	2	43	28	+15	26	
3	Mississippi Brilla	14	6	3	5	34	29	+5	23	
4	AHFC Royals	14	5	4	5	26	22	+4	20	
5	Texas United	14	2	11	1	13	46	−33	7	
6	Houston FC	14	1	10	3	11	39	−28	6	

Source: 2019 USL League Two standings
Rules for classification: 1) head-to-head record; 2) total wins; 3) total goal differential; 4) total goals scored; 5) record against the smallest group; 6) points earned against top four conference finishers; 7) point percentage outside smallest group; 8) disciplinary points; 9) coin toss or drawing of lots

=== Central Conference ===
==== Great Lakes Division ====
Pos	Team	Pld	W	L	T	GF	GA	GD	Pts	Qualification
1	Chicago FC United	12	8	3	1	27	9	+18	25	Central Conference playoffs
2	Flint City Bucks	12	6	3	3	20	17	+3	21	Central Conference playoffs
3	Cincinnati Dutch Lions	12	5	3	4	17	15	+2	19	
4	Dayton Dutch Lions	12	5	6	1	17	19	−2	16	
5	West Virginia Alliance FC	12	0	9	3	7	28	−21	3	

Source: 2019 USL League Two standings
Rules for classification: 1) head-to-head record; 2) total wins; 3) total goal differential; 4) total goals scored; 5) record against the smallest group; 6) points earned against top four conference finishers; 7) point percentage outside smallest group; 8) disciplinary points; 9) coin toss or drawing of lots

==== Heartland Division ====
Pos	Team	Pld	W	L	T	GF	GA	GD	Pts	Qualification
1	Des Moines Menace (R)	14	11	0	3	30	4	+26	36	Central Conference playoffs
2	Kaw Valley FC	14	7	3	4	18	9	+9	25	Central Conference playoffs
3	Thunder Bay Chill	14	6	6	2	19	19	0	20 (Note: Thunder Bay Chill and Green Bay Voyageurs were tied on head-to-head points. (3-3))	
4	Green Bay Voyageurs	14	5	4	5	18	15	+3	20	
5	St. Louis Lions	14	4	7	3	17	20	−3	15	
6	WSA Winnipeg	14	0	13	1	5	40	−35	1	

Source: 2019 USL League Two standings
Rules for classification: 1) head-to-head record; 2) total wins; 3) total goal differential; 4) total goals scored; 5) record against the smallest group; 6) points earned against top four conference finishers; 7) point percentage outside smallest group; 8) disciplinary points; 9) coin toss or drawing of lots
(R) Regular Season Champions

=== Western Conference ===
==== Northwest Division ====
Pos	Team	Pld	W	L	T	GF	GA	GD	Pts	Qualification
1	Calgary Foothills FC	14	9	3	2	25	15	+10	29	Western Conference playoffs
2	Seattle Sounders FC U-23	14	7	3	4	24	13	+11	25	
3	Lane United FC	14	5	4	5	22	17	+5	20	
4	Victoria Highlanders	14	6	7	1	22	22	0	19	
5	Portland Timbers U23	14	3	7	4	19	33	−14	13	
6	TSS FC Rovers (J)	14	3	9	2	19	31	−12	11	

Source: 2019 USL League Two standings
Rules for classification: 1) head-to-head record; 2) total wins; 3) total goal differential; 4) total goals scored; 5) record against the smallest group; 6) points earned against top four conference finishers; 7) point percentage outside smallest group; 8) disciplinary points; 9) coin toss or drawing of lots
(J) Juan de Fuca Plate

==== Mountain Division ====
Pos	Team	Pld	W	L	T	GF	GA	GD	Pts	Qualification
1	Colorado Pride Switchbacks U23	12	9	2	1	30	15	+15	28	Western Conference playoffs
2	Ogden City SC	12	6	4	2	23	19	+4	20	
3	Park City Red Wolves	12	3	6	3	18	26	−8	12	
4	Albuquerque Sol FC	12	2	8	2	12	23	−11	8	

Source: 2019 USL League Two standings
Rules for classification: 1) head-to-head record; 2) total wins; 3) total goal differential; 4) total goals scored; 5) record against the smallest group; 6) points earned against top four conference finishers; 7) point percentage outside smallest group; 8) disciplinary points; 9) coin toss or drawing of lots

==== Southwest Division ====
Pos	Team	Pld	W	L	T	GF	GA	GD	Pts	Qualification
1	FC Golden State Force	14	11	2	1	42	14	+28	34	Western Conference playoffs
2	Ventura County Fusion	14	9	4	1	38	24	+14	28	Western Conference playoffs
3	Southern California Seahorses	14	6	4	4	21	19	+2	22	
4	Orange County SC U-23	14	4	5	5	28	26	+2	17 (Note: Orange County SC U-23 won the tiebreaker over Santa Cruz Breakers FC on head-to-head points. (6-0))	
5	Santa Cruz Breakers FC	14	5	7	2	27	35	−8	17	
6	San Francisco City FC	14	4	7	3	26	42	−16	15	
7	San Diego Zest FC	14	3	7	4	22	32	−10	13	
8	San Francisco Glens SC	14	2	8	4	23	35	−12	10	

Source: 2019 USL League Two standings
Rules for classification: 1) head-to-head record; 2) total wins; 3) total goal differential; 4) total goals scored; 5) record against the smallest group; 6) points earned against top four conference finishers; 7) point percentage outside smallest group; 8) disciplinary points; 9) coin toss or drawing of lots

== Playoffs ==
Conference Semifinals
**MS**	**Brazos Valley Cavalry F.C.**	**3**
WC	SC United Bantams	0
**Southern Conference**
**DS**	**Tormenta FC 2**	**3**
SE	The Villages SC	1
**NE**	**Western Mass Pioneers**	**3**
SA	North Carolina Fusion U23	1
**Eastern Conference**
**MA**	**Reading United AC** (p)	**1(5)**
WC	GPS Portland Phoenix	1(4)
**SW**	**FC Golden State Force**	**4**
MT	Col. Pride Switchbacks U23	0
**Western Conference**
NW	Calgary Foothills FC	2
**WC**	**Ventura County Fusion**	**3**
HL1	Des Moines Menace	3(2)
GL2	**Flint City Bucks** (p)	**3(4)**
**Central Conference**
GL1	Chicago FC United	2
**HL2**	**Kaw Valley FC** (a.e.t.)	**3**

Conference Finals
MS	Brazos Valley Cavalry F.C.	1
**DS**	**Tormenta FC 2**	5
NE	Western Mass Pioneers	0
**MA**	**Reading United AC**	**1**
**SW**	**FC Golden State Force**	**2**
WC	Ventura County Fusion	1
**GL2**	**Flint City Bucks**	4
HL2	Kaw Valley FC	2

National Semifinals
South	Tormenta FC 2	2
**East**	**Reading United AC** (a.e.t.)	**3**
West	FC Golden State Force	0
**Central**	**Flint City Bucks**	**1**

National Championship
East	Reading United AC	0
**Central**	**Flint City Bucks** (a.e.t.)	**1**

Bold = winner

== Conference Championships ==
The League Two Conference Championships will be held over the weekend of July 19–21. Matches will be played at: Whittier, CA (Western Conference, host FC Golden State Force); Reading, PA (Eastern Conference, host Reading United AC); Des Moines, IA (Central Conference, host Des Moines Menace); and Columbia, SC (Southern Conference, host SC United Bantams). The four conference champions will advance to the League Two semifinals.

=== Eastern Conference ===
July 20, 2019 Conference Semifinal	Western Mass Pioneers	3–1	North Carolina Fusion U23	Gurski Stadium; West Lawn, Pennsylvania
4:00 PM	Rosano 10', 22'; Boucette (yellow card) 41'; (yellow card) 49'; Nwabia (yellow card) 76'; Viera 81'; (yellow card) 90'	Report	Penland 79'; (yellow card) 49'; Brewster (yellow card) 88'; (yellow card) 90'

July 20, 2019 Conference Semifinal	Reading United AC	1–1 (a.e.t.) (4–3 p)	GPS Portland Phoenix	Gurski Stadium; West Lawn, Pennsylvania
7:00 PM	Schlentz 52'; Dogan (yellow card) 18'	Report 1 Report 2	Hall (yellow card) 7' (goal) 42'; Keary (yellow card); Amspacher (yellow card) 78'; Ycaza (yellow card)
	Penalties
	Dogan (penalty scored); Medkhar (penalty missed); Fane (penalty scored)		(penalty missed) Ward-Baptiste; (penalty scored) Hall; (penalty scored) Ycaza; (penalty missed) Forsyth; (penalty scored) Peterson

July 21, 2019 Conference Final	Reading United AC	1–0	Western Mass Pioneers	Gurski Stadium; West Lawn, Pennsylvania
7:00 PM	Bennett 43'; Fane (yellow card) 45+'; Sinclair (yellow card) 51'; Dogan (yellow card) 62'; Hideki (yellow card) 68'; Waso (yellow card) 84'	Report	Viera (yellow card); Mullen (yellow card) 90+6'

=== Southern Conference ===
July 19, 2019 Conference Semifinal	South Georgia Tormenta FC 2	3–1	The Villages SC	Southeastern Freight Lines Soccer Center; Columbia, SC
5:00 PM	Mayr-Fälten 56' (yellow card); Donnelly 74'; Billhardt 84'	Report	Paiva 89'; Viola (yellow card)

July 20, 2019 Conference Semifinal	SC United Bantams	0–3	Brazos Valley Cavalry F.C.	Southeastern Freight Lines Soccer Center; Columbia, SC
9:00 AM		Report	Edwards 25'; Ruiz 75'

July 21, 2019 Conference Final	Brazos Valley Cavalry F.C.	1–5	South Georgia Tormenta FC 2	Southeastern Freight Lines Soccer Center; Columbia, SC
7:30 PM	Faletto 43'	Report	Walshaw 3'; Perez 20'; Billhardt 25', 73'; Young 69'

=== Central Conference ===
July 19, 2019 Conference Semifinal	Chicago FC United	2–3 (a.e.t.)	Kaw Valley FC	Drake Stadium; Des Moines, Iowa
5:30 PM CDT	Perez 84', 93'	Report	Popgeorgiev 45' (pen.); Visconti 103'; Lettner 113'

July 19, 2019 Conference Semifinal	Des Moines Menace	3–3 (a.e.t.) (2–4 p)	Flint City Bucks	Drake Stadium; Des Moines, Iowa
8:00 PM CDT	Chavez 30'; Mastrangelo 55', 107'	Report	Guglielmi 45'; Myers 90'; Vasconcelos 120'
	Penalties
	Perea (penalty scored); Thomas (penalty missed); Bryan (penalty scored); Mukuna (penalty missed)		(penalty scored) Camara; (penalty scored) Vasconcelos; (penalty scored) Biros; (penalty missed) Nasser; (penalty scored) Ingram

July 21, 2019 Conference Final	Kaw Valley FC	2–4	Flint City Bucks	Drake Stadium; Des Moines, Iowa
5:00 PM CDT	Ray-Campoy 24'; Rude 28'	Report	Guglielmi 7'; Tambe 15'; Steinwascher 56'; Ingram 90+3'

=== Western Conference ===
July 20, 2019 Conference Semifinal	Calgary Foothills FC	2–3	Ventura County Fusion	Rio Hondo College; Whittier, California
4:00 PM PDT	Pepple 58'; Fakunle 90'	Report	Vargas 2'; Conway 17'; Adames 45'

July 20, 2019 Conference Semifinal	FC Golden State Force	4–0	Colorado Pride Switchbacks U23	Rio Hondo College; Whittier, California
7:00 PM PDT	Trejo 1'; Costa 45+1'; Aguirre 78'; Alewine 82'	Report

July 21, 2019 Conference Final	FC Golden State Force	2–1	Ventura County Fusion	Rio Hondo College; Whittier, California
7:00 PM	Trejo 14'; Oliveira 66'	Report	Vargas 63'

== USL League Two Championship ==
July 27, 2019 National Semifinal	Flint City Bucks	1–0	FC Golden State Force	Atwood Stadium; Flint, Michigan
7:30 PM CDT	Farkas 78' (pen.)	Report 1 Report 2		Attendance: 4,633

July 28, 2019 National Semifinal	South Georgia Tormenta FC 2	2–3 (a.e.t.)	Reading United AC	Erk Russell Park; Statesboro, Georgia
8:00 PM	Strachan 12'; Billhardt 14'; McCall (yellow card) 36'	Report	Fane 70'; Bagayoko 84'; Dogan (yellow card) 110'; Hummrich (yellow card) 112'; Galizzi (yellow card) 119'; Hideki 120'

=== Final ===
August 3, 2019 National Final	Flint City Bucks	1–0 (a.e.t.)	Reading United AC	Atwood Stadium; Flint, Michigan
7:30 PM EDT	Bentley (yellow card); Guglielmi (yellow card); Tambe 110' (pen.)	Report	Delgado (yellow card) 80'; Hideki (yellow card) 84'; Conte (red card) 118'	Attendance: 7,198

Championship MVP: (Cameroon) Ayuk Tambe (FCB)

== Awards ==
=== Individual Awards ===
- Most Valuable Player: (England) Deri Corfe (OCN)
- Golden Boot: (England) Deri Corfe (OCN) & (Saint Vincent and the Grenadines) Kyle Edwards (BVC)
- Golden Glove: (United States) Blake Mullen (WMA)
- Young (U20) Player of the Year: (Scotland) Kyle Ferguson (SCU)
- Coach of the Year: (England) Alan McCann (REA)
- Goalkeeper of the Year: (United States) Robert Edwards (SCU)
- Defender of the Year: (Guinea) Lamine Conte (REA)

=== Monthly Awards ===
Goal of the Month
Month	Player	Club	Opponent	Ref.
May	(Portugal) Henrique Santos	North Carolina Fusion U23	Lionsbridge FC	
June	(Spain) Noe Garcia	Fort Wayne FC	Dayton Dutch Lions	

Save of the Month
Month	Player	Club	Opponent	Ref.
May	(Netherlands) Patrick Timmer	Tri-Cities Otters	North Carolina Fusion U23	
June	(Serbia) Marko Rajic	FC Miami City	Tampa Bay United	

Player of the Month
Month	Player	Club	Reason	Ref.
May	(Chile) Nicolas Cam	Mississippi Brilla	6 goals in 3 games	
June	(Serbia) Marko Rajic	FC Miami City	Tampa Bay United	

=== Weekly Awards ===
Goal of the Week
Week	Player	Club	Opponent	Ref.
2	(Canada) Conor MacMillan	TSS FC Rovers	Lane United FC	
3	(Brazil) Lukas Sueth	Florida Elite SA	The Villages SC	
4	(Canada) Joshua Walter	Victoria Highlanders FC	Seattle Sounders FC U-23	
5	(Spain) Mario Arrocha	San Francisco City FC	Southern California Seahorses	
6	(England) Arthur Rogers	Corpus Christi FC	Texas United	
7	(Malawi) Mayele Malango	Boston Bolts	Manhattan SC	
8	(France) Merveil Bilomba	Tri-Cities Otters	Virginia Beach United	
9	(United States) Karlo Lopez	Corpus Christi FC	Houston FC	
10	(Brazil) Roque Viegas	Treasure Coast Tritons	Lakeland Tropics SC	
11	(United States) Johnny Rodriguez	Ventura County Fusion	San Francisco Glens SC	

Save of the Week
2	(Canada) Luciano Trasolini	TSS FC Rovers	Lane United FC
3	(Spain) Álex Iglesias	Mississippi Brilla FC	Texas United
4	(United States) Bobby Edwards	SC United Bantams	Peachtree City MOBA
5	(United States) Keagan McLaughlin	Cincinnati Dutch Lions	West Virginia Alliance FC
6	(Spain) Carlos Rubio	Tri–Cities Otters	North Carolina Fusion U23
7	(United States) Trevor Wilson	Portland Timbers U23	Victoria Highlanders FC
8	(Australia) Gerard Roebuck	Corpus Christi FC	Mississippi Brilla
9	(France) Jeremy Coste	FC Miami City	Florida Elite SA
10	(Spain) Carlos Rubio	Tri–Cities Otters	Lionsbridge FC

Team of the Week
Week	Goalkeeper	Defenders	Midfielders	Forwards	Ref.
3	(Australia) Devenish-Meares (GPP)	(England) Adeniyi (DAL) (United States) Wetungu (FCB) (Canada) Guilherme (VIC)	(Hungary) Militar (LBR) (United States) Ngoh (NCA) (England) Wright (CRP) (Mexico) Trejo (GSF)	(United States) Dexter (LIR) (Chile) Cam (MBR) (Canada) Polisi (TSS)	
4	(United States) Sarmiento (SDZ)	(Scotland) Bauld (CGY) (Canada) Guilherme (VIC) (United States) Schlentz (REA)	(United States) Vargas (VCF) (Serbia) Lukic (CRP) (Austria) Mayr-Fälten (TR2) (United States) Doran (BOS)	(United States) Popovic (FCB) (Canada) Johnson (TCT) (Burkina Faso) Bouda (BLR)	
5	(Jamaica) Waite (REA)	(Jamaica) Sewell (TR2) (United States) Easterling (DMM) (Spain) Romero (WMP)	(Japan) Takada (BVC) (France) Fourrier (POT) (United States) Fawole (VIL) (Spain) Monells (TOB)	(Italy) Ballestracci (SCB) (United States) Hamler (STL) (Burkina Faso) Bouda (BLR)	
6	(Canada) Schneider (VIC)	(England) Mukuna (DMM) (United States) Uche (NYR) (United States) Graff (LUF)	(United States) Myers (FES) (United States) Masch (SFC) (England) Wright (CRP) (Germany) Wintermeyer (CFU)	(United States) Popp (NCA) (United States) Markanich (GBV) (Haiti) Castin (DAL)	
7	(Spain) Campuzano (SEA)	(England) Stanley (TRI) (United States) DeBolt (FCB) (France) Sirugue (MIA)	(United States) Perez (CHI) (France) Brador (SCU) (United States) McGlynn (ENY) (Denmark) Jensen (LFU)	(Brazil) Paiva (VIL) (Italy) Ballestracci (SCB) (Argentina) Damine (WMP)	
8	(Netherlands) Storm (CDL)	(France) Cissoko (SDZ) (United States) Sloan (LIR) (England) Evans (BVC)	(Benin) Ntignee (VIC) (Brazil) Luca (PCM) (United States) Waleffe (CHI) (United States) Beer (MAN)	(Brazil) Paiva (VIL) (France) Vassart (TRI) (Peru) Medina (SCS)	
9	(France) Mwembia (CHI)	(British Virgin Islands) Wiltshire (DMM) (United States) Estrada (SCS) (Canada) Ruby (VIC) (Spain) Hernandez (FES) (France) Chemin (MBR)	(England) Corfe (OCN) (Austria) Mayr-Fälten (TR2) (Germany) Kuemmerle (TBC)	(United States) Rodriguez (VCF) (Germany) Wintermeyer (CHI)	
10	(France) Mwembia (CHI)	(Jamaica) Senior (DAY) (United States) Miller (WMP) (Canada) Pritchard (CGY)	(United States) Perez (CHI) (United States) Almubaslat (NCF) (United States) Drack (COS) (United States) Boyce (BVC)	(United States) Boyce (SDZ) (England) Corfe (OCN) (Brazil) Silva (TBC)	
11	(United States) Kasim (SEA)	(United States) Strachan (TOR) (United States) Markanich (GBV) (United States) Penland (NCF)	(England) Rogers (CRP) (United States) Barone (FCB) (England) Chechlacz (STL) (Australia) Joice (NCF)	(United States) Meza (SEA) (Spain) Monells (TOB) (Brazil) Hideki (REA)	

== All-League and All-Conference Teams ==
=== Eastern Conference ===
F: (England) Deri Corfe (OCN) *, (France) Thibaut Jacquel (LBR), (Liberia) Donnett Sackie (VBU)
M: (United States) Jack Beer (MAN) *, (Spain) Manuel Ferriol (LIR), (United States) Taylor Gray (TRI), (Brazil) Felipe Hideki (REA) *
D: (Germany) Gideon Betz (LBR), (Guinea) Lamine Conte (REA) *, (Germany) Friedrich Peter (VBU)
G: (United States) Blake Mullen (WMA)

=== Central Conference ===
F: (Brazil) Yuri Farkas (FCB), (Brazil) Sullivan Oliveira Silva (TBC), (Germany) Gerit Wintermeyer (CHI) *
M: (United States) Giuseppe Barone (FCB), (Germany) Jackson Dietrich (DAY), (Venezuela) Jorge Guinovart (CIN), (United States) Nicolás Perea (DMM)
D: (England) Reece Hands (CIN), (Hong Kong) Leon Jones (CHI), (England) James Thomas (DMM) *
G: (Scotland) Jordan Bell (DMM)

=== Southern Conference ===
F: (England) J.J. Donnelly (SGT), (Brazil) Leonardo Paiva (VIL) *, (United States) Jonathan Ricketts (DRW)
M: (Germany) Adrian Billhardt (SGT) *, (Austria) Luca Mayr (SGT) *, (United States) Kobe Perez (SGT), (England) Harrison Roberts (SCU)
D: (Brazil) Artur De Luca (PCM), (Togo) Shalom Dutey (CHE), (Scotland) Kyle Ferguson (SCU) *
G: (United States) Robert Edwards (SCU) *

=== Western Conference ===
F: (United States) Manuel Medina (SCS), (United States) Enoch Mushagalusa (CPS), (Mexico) Daniel Trejo (GSF)
M: (Kenya) Nabilai Kibunguchy (SFG), (United States) Julio Rubio (ABU), (Japan) Shun Takano (VIC), (Japan) Shizu Yohena (SDZ)
D: (United States) Ray Estrada (SCS), (Canada) Jordan Haynes (TSS), (United States) Edward Venta-Yepes (CPS)
G: (Spain) Albert Escuin (LAN)

* denotes All-League player

=== Team of the Year ===
F: (Germany) Gerit Wintermeyer (CHI), (England) Deri Corfe (OCN) (League MVP And Golden Boot), (Brazil) Leonardo Paiva (VIL)
M: (Brazil) Felipe Hideki (REA), (Austria) Luca Mayr (SGT), (Germany) Adrian Billhardt (SGT), (United States) Jack Beer (MAN)
D: (Guinea) Lamine Conte (REA) (Defender of the Year), (England) James Thomas (DMM), (Scotland) Kyle Ferguson (SCU) (Young (U20) Player of the Year)
G: (United States) Robert Edwards (SCU) (Goalkeeper of the Year)
