= 2020 USL League Two season =

USL League Two
- Season: 2020
- Dates: May 3 – July 17 (regular season; planned)

The 2020 USL League Two season was to have been the 26th season of the USL League Two, the top pre-professional soccer league in the United States, since its establishment in 1995. Flint City Bucks were the defending champions after defeating Reading United in the National Championship the previous season.

The regular season was scheduled to start on May 3 and conclude on July 17. There would have been a record of 81 teams participating in this season across 12 divisions, with the addition of the Metropolitan division.

On April 30, 2020 the season was canceled due to the COVID-19 pandemic.

== Team changes ==
=== New teams ===
- AFC Ann Arbor
- Asheville City
- Bascome Bermuda
- Colorado Rush SC
- East Atlanta FC
- Grand Rapids FC
- Louisville City FC U23
- New Mexico United U23
- Oakland County
- Peoria City
- Philadelphia Lone Star
- South Bend Lions
- Southern Soccer Academy
- Tampa Bay Rowdies U-23
- TFA Willamette
- West Chester United

=== Departing teams ===
- Albuquerque Sol FC
- Colorado Pride Switchbacks U23
- Fresno U-23
- Lakeland Tropics
- Orange County U-23
- San Diego Zest
- Victoria Highlanders

=== Name changes ===
- Discoveries SC to Charlotte Independence 2
- WSA Winnipeg to FC Manitoba
- Seattle Sounders U-23 to Eastside FC

== Teams ==
Central Conference
Division	Team
Great Lakes Division	AFC Ann Arbor
Great Lakes Division	Cincinnati Dutch Lions
Great Lakes Division	Dayton Dutch Lions
Great Lakes Division	Flint City Bucks
Great Lakes Division	Grand Rapids FC
Great Lakes Division	Louisville City FC U23
Great Lakes Division	Oakland County FC
Great Lakes Division	South Bend Lions FC
Heartland Division	Chicago FC United
Heartland Division	Des Moines Menace
Heartland Division	Green Bay Voyageurs FC
Heartland Division	Kaw Valley FC
Heartland Division	~~FC Manitoba~~
Heartland Division	~~Peoria City~~
Heartland Division	St. Louis Lions
Heartland Division	~~Thunder Bay Chill~~
Mid South Division	AHFC Royals
Mid South Division	Brazos Valley Cavalry FC
Mid South Division	Corpus Christi FC
Mid South Division	Houston FC
Mid South Division	Mississippi Brilla FC
Mid South Division	Texas United

Eastern Conference
Division	Team
Northeast Division	AC Connecticut
Northeast Division	Black Rock FC
Northeast Division	Boston Bolts
Northeast Division	GPS Portland Phoenix
Northeast Division	Seacoast United Phantoms
Northeast Division	Western Mass Pioneers
Mid Atlantic Division	~~FC Bascome Bermuda~~
Mid Atlantic Division	Evergreen FC
Mid Atlantic Division	Lehigh Valley United
Mid Atlantic Division	Ocean City Nor'easters
Mid Atlantic Division	Philadelphia Lone Star FC
Mid Atlantic Division	Reading United AC
Mid Atlantic Division	West Chester United SC
~~Metropolitan Division~~	Cedar Stars Rush
~~Metropolitan Division~~	F.A. Euro
~~Metropolitan Division~~	Long Island Rough Riders
~~Metropolitan Division~~	Manhattan SC
~~Metropolitan Division~~	New York Red Bulls U-23
~~Metropolitan Division~~	Westchester Flames

Southern Conference
Division	Team
Deep South Division	Asheville City SC
Deep South Division	Charlotte Eagles
Deep South Division	Charlotte Independence 2
Deep South Division	Dalton Red Wolves SC
Deep South Division	East Atlanta FC
Deep South Division	Peachtree City MOBA
Deep South Division	SC United Bantams
Deep South Division	Tormenta FC 2
Deep South Division	Southern Soccer Academy
Southeast Division	Daytona Rush SC
Southeast Division	Florida Elite SA
Southeast Division	FC Miami City
Southeast Division	Sarasota Metropolis FC
Southeast Division	Tampa Bay Rowdies U-23
Southeast Division	The Villages SC
Southeast Division	Treasure Coast Tritons
Southeast Division	Weston FC
South Atlantic Division	Lionsbridge FC
South Atlantic Division	North Carolina FC U23
South Atlantic Division	North Carolina Fusion U23
South Atlantic Division	Tobacco Road FC
South Atlantic Division	Tri-Cities Otters
South Atlantic Division	Virginia Beach United FC
South Atlantic Division	Wake FC
South Atlantic Division	West Virginia Alliance

Western Conference
Division	Team
Mountain Division	Colorado Rush SC
Mountain Division	New Mexico United U23
Mountain Division	Ogden City SC
Mountain Division	Park City Red Wolves
Northwest Division	Calgary Foothills FC
Northwest Division	Eastside FC
Northwest Division	Lane United FC
Northwest Division	Portland Timbers U23
Northwest Division	TFA Willamette
Northwest Division	TSS FC Rovers
Southwest Division	FC Golden State Force
Southwest Division	San Francisco City FC
Southwest Division	San Francisco Glens
Southwest Division	Santa Cruz Breakers FC
Southwest Division	Southern California Seahorses
Southwest Division	Ventura County Fusion

Notes:

- On April 10, 2020, Three Heartland Teams withdrawn for 2020 season due to COVID-19 Pandemic and will return for 2021.
- On April 17, 2020, FC Bascome Bermuda takes a hiatus for 2020 season due to COVID-19 Pandemic and will return for 2021.
- On April 22, 2020, the Metropolitan Division withdrawn for 2020 season due to COVID-19 Pandemic and will return for 2021.
