= 2022 USL League Two season =

USL League Two
- Season: 2022
- Dates: May 1 - July 17 (regular season)
- Champions: Ventura County Fusion (2nd Title)
- Regular Season Champions: Lionsbridge FC (1st Title)
- Matches: 796
- Goals: 2,784 (3.5 per match)
- Best Player: (Trinidad and Tobago) Samory Powder Hudson Valley Hammers
- Top goalscorer: (United States) Ethan Stevenson Brazos Valley Cavalry FC (19 Goals)
- Best goalkeeper: (Germany) Felix Schäfer Ocean City Nor’easters
- Biggest home win: CDY 7, TOB 2 (May 14)
- Biggest away win: DDL 0, SBL 5 (May 14); WAK 1, WVU 6 (May 14)
- Highest scoring: CDY 7, TOB 2 (May 14)
- Longest winning run: 10 matches Western Mass Pioneers (May 31 – July 15)
- Longest unbeaten run: 14 matches Lionsbridge FC; Ocean City Nor'easters; Texas United (entire season)
- Longest winless run: 13 matches Westchester Flames (May 21 - July 16)
- Longest losing run: 11 matches AC Houston Sur (May 11 – June 28); Morris Elite SC (June 4 – July 16)
- All statistics correct as of August 6, 2022.

The 2022 USL League Two season was the 27th season of USL League Two.

The regular season began on May 1 and ended on July 17. 113 teams participated in this season. The league reached a new high of 16 divisions after removing the Deep South division and adding five new divisions. The new divisions were the Chesapeake, Deep North, Lone Star, South Central, and Valley.

== Team changes ==
=== New teams ===
- Ballard FC (Seattle, WA)
- Blackwatch Rush (Albany, NY)
- Blue Goose SC (Shreveport, LA)
- Boston City FC (Revere, MA)
- Caledonia SC (Lakeland, FL)
- Central Valley Fuego FC 2
- Chicago City SC
- Chicago Dutch Lions FC
- Christos FC (Baltimore, MD)
- Cleveland Force SC
- Colorado International Soccer Academy (Aurora, CO)
- Commonwealth Cardinals FC (Fredericksburg, VA)
- Davis Legacy SC (Davis, CA)
- AC Houston Sur
- Hudson Valley Hammers (Hudson Valley, NY)
- One Knoxville SC
- Lansing City Football
- LA Parish AC (Baton Rouge, LA)
- Louisiana Krewe FC (Lafayette, LA)
- Miami AC
- Marin FC Legends (Marin County, CA)
- Midwest United FC (Grand Rapids, MI)
- Minneapolis City SC
- New Mexico United U-23 (Albuquerque, NM)
- NONA FC (Orlando, FL)
- Oly Town FC (Olympia, WA)
- Patuxent Football Athletics (Patuxent, MD)
- St. Croix SC (Stillwater, MN)
- Springfield Athletic SC (Springfield, IL)
- Tennessee SC (Franklin, TN)
- Vermont Green FC (Burlington, VT)

=== Returning teams ===
- FC Manitoba
- St. Louis Lions
- Thunder Bay Chill

=== Departing teams ===
- Calgary Foothills FC
- Grand Rapids FC
- Green Bay Voyageurs
- New York Red Bulls U-23
- Saint Louis Scott Gallagher
- Santa Cruz Breakers FC
- TSS FC Rovers

=== Name changes ===
- FC Málaga City New York to Pathfinder FC
- Colorado Rush SC to Flatirons Rush SC
- Ogden City SC to Salt City SC
- Portland Timbers U23s to Capital FC (Salem, OR)

== Teams ==
Central Conference
Division	Team
Great Lakes Division	AFC Ann Arbor
Great Lakes Division	Flint City Bucks
Great Lakes Division	Kalamazoo FC
Great Lakes Division	Lansing City Football
Great Lakes Division	Midwest United FC
Great Lakes Division	Oakland County FC
Heartland Division	Chicago City SC
Heartland Division	Chicago Dutch Lions
Heartland Division	Chicago FC United
Heartland Division	FC Wichita
Heartland Division	Kaw Valley FC
Heartland Division	Springfield Athletic SC
Heartland Division	St. Louis Lions
Valley Division	Cleveland Force SC
Valley Division	Dayton Dutch Lions
Valley Division	Fort Wayne FC
Valley Division	Kings Hammer FC
Valley Division	South Bend Lions
Valley Division	Toledo Villa FC
Deep North Division	Des Moines Menace
Deep North Division	FC Manitoba
Deep North Division	Minneapolis City SC
Deep North Division	Peoria City
Deep North Division	St. Croix SC
Deep North Division	Thunder Bay Chill

Eastern Conference
Division	Team
Northeast Division	AC Connecticut
Northeast Division	Black Rock FC
Northeast Division	Blackwatch Rush
Northeast Division	Boston Bolts
Northeast Division	Boston City FC
Northeast Division	Pathfinder FC
Northeast Division	Seacoast United Phantoms
Northeast Division	Vermont Green FC
Northeast Division	Western Mass Pioneers
Mid Atlantic Division	Lehigh Valley United
Mid Atlantic Division	Ocean City Nor'easters
Mid Atlantic Division	Philadelphia Lone Star
Mid Atlantic Division	Reading United AC
Mid Atlantic Division	Real Central New Jersey
Mid Atlantic Division	West Chester United
Metropolitan Division	Cedar Stars Rush
Metropolitan Division	F.A. Euro
Metropolitan Division	FC Motown
Metropolitan Division	Hudson Valley Hammers
Metropolitan Division	Long Island Rough Riders
Metropolitan Division	Manhattan SC
Metropolitan Division	Morris Elite SC
Metropolitan Division	New Jersey Copa
Metropolitan Division	Westchester Flames
Chesapeake Division	Christos FC
Chesapeake Division	Commonwealth Cardinals FC
Chesapeake Division	Lionsbridge FC
Chesapeake Division	Northern Virginia FC
Chesapeake Division	Patuxent Football Athletics
Chesapeake Division	Virginia Beach United

Southern Conference
Division	Team
South Central Division	Asheville City SC
South Central Division	Dalton Red Wolves
South Central Division	East Atlanta FC
South Central Division	One Knoxville SC
South Central Division	Peachtree City MOBA
South Central Division	SC United Bantams
South Central Division	Southern Soccer Academy Kings
South Central Division	Tennessee SC
South Central Division	Tri-Cities Otters
South Central Division	Tormenta FC 2
Southeast Division	Caledonia SC
Southeast Division	FC Florida U23
Southeast Division	FC Miami City
Southeast Division	Florida Elite SA
Southeast Division	Miami AC
Southeast Division	NONA FC
Southeast Division	Tampa Bay United
Southeast Division	The Villages SC
Southeast Division	Weston FC
South Atlantic Division	Charlotte Eagles
South Atlantic Division	Charlotte Independence 2
South Atlantic Division	North Carolina FC U23
South Atlantic Division	North Carolina Fusion U23
South Atlantic Division	Tobacco Road FC
South Atlantic Division	Wake FC
South Atlantic Division	West Virginia United
Mid South Division	Blue Goose SC
Mid South Division	LA Parish AC
Mid South Division	Little Rock Rangers
Mid South Division	Louisiana Krewe FC
Mid South Division	Mississippi Brilla
Mid South Division	Texas United
Lone Star Division	AC Houston Sur
Lone Star Division	AHFC Royals
Lone Star Division	Brazos Valley Cavalry
Lone Star Division	Corpus Christi FC
Lone Star Division	Houston FC
Lone Star Division	Round Rock SC

Western Conference
Division	Team
Mountain Division	Colorado International Soccer Academy
Mountain Division	Flatirons Rush SC
Mountain Division	New Mexico United U-23
Mountain Division	Park City Red Wolves
Mountain Division	Salt City SC
Northwest Division	Ballard FC
Northwest Division	Capital FC
Northwest Division	Lane United FC
Northwest Division	Oly Town FC
Northwest Division	OVF Alliance
Northwest Division	PDX FC
Southwest Division	Central Valley Fuego FC 2
Southwest Division	Davis Legacy SC
Southwest Division	Golden State Force
Southwest Division	Marin FC Legends
Southwest Division	Project 51O
Southwest Division	San Francisco City FC
Southwest Division	San Francisco Glens
Southwest Division	Southern California Seahorses
Southwest Division	Ventura County Fusion

== Standings ==
=== Eastern Conference ===
==== Northeast Division ====
Pos	Team	Pld	W	D	L	GF	GA	GD	Pts	PPG	Qualification
1	Seacoast United Phantoms	14	12	1	1	37	13	+24	37	2.64	Advance to USL League Two Playoffs
2	Western Mass Pioneers	14	11	0	3	36	15	+21	33	2.36	Advance to USL League Two Playoffs
3	Vermont Green FC	14	9	1	4	38	14	+24	28	2.00	Advance to USL League Two Playoffs
4	Boston City FC	14	8	0	6	24	22	+2	24	1.71	
5	Black Rock FC	14	6	1	7	22	23	−1	19	1.36	
6	Boston Bolts	14	5	2	7	19	24	−5	17	1.21	
7	AC Connecticut	14	4	1	9	26	34	−8	13	0.93	
8	Blackwatch Rush	14	3	1	10	16	35	−19	10	0.71	
9	Pathfinder FC	14	1	1	12	8	46	−38	4	0.29	

Source: USL

==== Mid Atlantic Division ====
Pos	Team	Pld	W	D	L	GF	GA	GD	Pts	PPG	Qualification
1	Ocean City Nor'easters	14	11	3	0	28	9	+19	36	2.57	Advance to USL League Two Playoffs
2	West Chester United SC	14	7	3	4	33	18	+15	24	1.71	
3	Real Central New Jersey	14	6	2	6	31	27	+4	20 (Note: Real Central New Jersey wins the tiebreaker over Reading United AC on total wins.)	1.43	
4	Reading United AC	14	5	5	4	22	21	+1	20	1.43	
5	Philadelphia Lone Star FC	14	3	4	7	25	39	−14	10	0.71	
6	Lehigh Valley United	14	1	1	12	21	46	−25	4	0.29	

Source: USL

==== Metropolitan Division ====
Pos	Team	Pld	W	D	L	GF	GA	GD	Pts	PPG	Qualification
1	Manhattan SC	14	12	0	2	32	15	+17	36	2.57	Advance to USL League Two Playoffs
2	Long Island Rough Riders	14	11	1	2	40	14	+26	34	2.43	Advance to USL League Two Playoffs
3	Hudson Valley Hammers	14	8	1	5	44	31	+13	25	1.79	
4	New Jersey Copa FC	14	7	1	6	26	29	−3	22	1.57	
5	F.A. Euro	14	6	3	5	22	21	+1	21	1.50	
6	Cedar Stars Rush	14	5	3	6	31	32	−1	18 (Note: Cedar Stars Rush wins the tiebreaker over FC Motown on Head-to-head record.)	1.29	
7	FC Motown	14	5	3	6	29	23	+6	18	1.29	
8	Westchester Flames	14	1	2	11	16	38	−22	5	0.36	
9	Morris Elite SC	14	1	0	13	9	46	−37	3	0.21	

Source: USL

==== Chesapeake Division ====
Pos	Team	Pld	W	D	L	GF	GA	GD	Pts	PPG	Qualification
1	Lionsbridge FC	14	12	2	0	47	11	+36	38	2.71	Advance to USL League Two Playoffs
2	Christos FC	13	9	1	3	51	18	+33	28	2.15	Advance to USL League Two Playoffs
3	Northern Virginia FC	13	7	1	5	30	24	+6	22	1.69	
4	Virginia Beach United	14	5	0	9	14	32	−18	15	1.07	
5	Patuxent Football Athletics	14	3	1	10	13	33	−20	10	0.71	
6	Commonwealth Cardinals FC	14	2	1	11	13	50	−37	7	0.50	

Source: USL

=== Central Conference ===
==== Great Lakes Division ====
Pos	Team	Pld	W	D	L	GF	GA	GD	Pts	PPG	Qualification
1	Kalamazoo FC	14	8	4	2	28	15	+13	28	2.00	Advance to USL League Two Playoffs
2	Flint City Bucks	14	8	3	3	31	13	+18	27	1.93	Advance to USL League Two Playoffs
3	AFC Ann Arbor	14	7	4	3	35	18	+17	25	1.79	
4	Oakland County FC	14	6	1	7	28	35	−7	19	1.36	
5	Lansing City Football	14	4	1	9	13	28	−15	13	0.93	
6	Midwest United FC	14	2	1	11	9	35	−26	7	0.50	

Source: USL

==== Heartland Division ====
Pos	Team	Pld	W	D	L	GF	GA	GD	Pts	PPG	Qualification
1	Chicago FC United	14	11	2	1	53	18	+35	35	2.50	Advance to USL League Two Playoffs
2	Kaw Valley FC	13	8	2	3	31	16	+15	26	2.00	Advance to USL League Two Playoffs
3	Chicago City SC	14	7	3	4	35	29	+6	24	1.71	
4	St. Louis Lions	13	6	3	4	31	22	+9	21	1.62	
5	FC Wichita	14	6	1	7	23	30	−7	19	1.36	
6	Springfield Athletic SC	14	2	1	11	16	38	−22	7	0.50	
7	Chicago Dutch Lions (Note: Last 3 games were forfeits)	14	2	0	12	18	54	−36	−3	−0.21	

Source: USL

==== Valley Division ====
Pos	Team	Pld	W	D	L	GF	GA	GD	Pts	PPG	Qualification
1	South Bend Lions	14	10	2	2	40	12	+28	32 (Note: South Bend Lions wins the tiebreaker over Kings Hammer FC on goal differential.)	2.29	Advance to USL League Two Playoffs
2	Kings Hammer FC	14	10	2	2	41	15	+26	32	2.29	Advance to USL League Two Playoffs
3	Fort Wayne FC	14	9	2	3	34	11	+23	26	1.86	
4	Toledo Villa FC	14	4	0	10	18	34	−16	12	0.86	
5	Dayton Dutch Lions	14	2	2	10	13	53	−40	7	0.50	
6	Cleveland Force SC	14	1	4	9	15	36	−21	7	0.50	

Source: USL

==== Deep North Division ====
Pos	Team	Pld	W	D	L	GF	GA	GD	Pts	PPG	Qualification
1	Des Moines Menace	12	10	2	0	37	9	+28	32	2.67	Advance to USL League Two Playoffs
2	Peoria City	12	6	3	3	22	18	+4	21 (Note: Peoria City wins the tiebreaker over Thunder Bay Chill on Head-to-head record.)	1.75	Advance to USL League Two Playoffs
3	Thunder Bay Chill	12	6	3	3	19	18	+1	21	1.75	
4	FC Manitoba	12	4	2	6	19	22	−3	14	1.17	
5	St. Croix SC	12	2	2	8	15	30	−15	8	0.67	
6	Minneapolis City SC	12	1	2	9	11	26	−15	5	0.42	

Source: USL

=== Southern Conference ===
==== South Central Division ====
Pos	Team	Pld	W	D	L	GF	GA	GD	Pts	PPG	Qualification
1	One Knoxville SC	14	11	1	2	34	10	+24	34	2.43	Advance to USL League Two Playoffs
2	Asheville City SC	14	9	4	1	37	13	+24	31	2.21	Advance to USL League Two Playoffs
3	Tormenta FC 2	13	7	2	4	23	16	+7	23	1.77	
4	Tri-Cities Otters	14	7	0	7	17	23	−6	21	1.50	
5	Tennessee SC	14	5	5	4	19	16	+3	20	1.43	
6	SC United Bantams	13	5	3	5	23	24	−1	18	1.38	
7	Peachtree City MOBA	14	5	0	9	24	30	−6	15 (Note: Peachtree City MOBA wins the tiebreaker over Dalton Red Wolves on total wins.)	1.07	
8	Dalton Red Wolves	14	4	3	7	19	25	−6	15	1.07	
9	Southern Soccer Academy Kings	14	3	3	8	12	30	−18	12	0.86	
10	East Atlanta FC	14	2	1	11	15	36	−21	7	0.50	

Source: USL

==== Southeast Division ====
Pos	Team	Pld	W	D	L	GF	GA	GD	Pts	PPG	Qualification
1	NONA FC	14	12	1	1	27	10	+17	37	2.64	Advance to USL League Two Playoffs
2	The Villages SC	14	9	3	2	24	11	+13	30	2.14	Advance to USL League Two Playoffs
3	FC Miami City	12	7	0	5	27	17	+10	21	1.75	
4	Florida Elite SA	13	6	3	4	25	17	+8	21	1.62	
5	Miami AC	14	6	2	6	16	16	0	20	1.43	
6	Weston FC	14	5	3	6	10	18	−8	18	1.29	
7	Tampa Bay United	12	3	2	7	14	16	−2	11	0.92	
8	Caledonia SC	13	2	1	10	7	32	−25	7	0.54	
9	FC Florida U23	14	1	3	10	13	26	−13	6	0.43	

Source: USL

==== South Atlantic Division ====
Pos	Team	Pld	W	D	L	GF	GA	GD	Pts	PPG	Qualification
1	North Carolina Fusion U23	14	11	2	1	48	15	+33	35	2.50	Advance to USL League Two Playoffs
2	West Virginia United	14	9	2	3	36	23	+13	29 (Note: West Virginia United wins the tiebreaker over Charlotte Eagles on goal differential.)	2.07	Advance to USL League Two Playoffs
3	Charlotte Eagles	14	9	2	3	38	26	+12	29	2.07	
4	Charlotte Independence 2	14	5	2	7	39	32	+7	17	1.21	
5	North Carolina FC U23	14	4	4	6	30	24	+6	16	1.14	
6	Tobacco Road FC	14	3	1	10	22	50	−28	10	0.71	
7	Wake FC	14	1	1	12	17	60	−43	4	0.29	

Source: USL

==== Mid South Division ====
Pos	Team	Pld	W	D	L	GF	GA	GD	Pts	PPG	Qualification
1	Texas United	14	9	5	0	32	13	+19	32	2.29	Advance to USL League Two Playoffs
2	Mississippi Brilla	13	8	1	4	33	13	+20	25	1.92	
3	Louisiana Krewe FC	14	6	4	4	39	26	+13	22	1.57	
4	Little Rock Rangers	14	5	4	5	26	23	+3	19	1.36	
5	Blue Goose SC	13	3	1	9	22	33	−11	10	0.77	
6	LA Parish AC	14	1	3	10	22	66	−44	6	0.43	

Source: USL

==== Lone Star Division ====
Pos	Team	Pld	W	D	L	GF	GA	GD	Pts	PPG	Qualification
1	Brazos Valley Cavalry F.C.	14	11	1	2	47	15	+32	34	2.43	Advance to USL League Two Playoffs
2	Houston FC	14	8	3	3	24	16	+8	27	1.93	
3	Corpus Christi FC	14	7	1	6	21	21	0	22	1.57	
4	Round Rock SC	14	5	3	6	25	33	−8	18	1.29	
5	AHFC Royals	14	3	3	8	24	33	−9	8	0.57	
6	AC Houston Sur	14	2	1	11	13	36	−23	7	0.50	

Source: USL

=== Western Conference ===
==== Mountain Division ====
Pos	Team	Pld	W	D	L	GF	GA	GD	Pts	PPG	Qualification
1	Park City Red Wolves	12	8	2	2	24	12	+12	26	2.17	Advance to USL League Two Playoffs
2	Flatirons Rush SC	12	7	2	3	22	16	+6	23	1.92	Advance to USL League Two Playoffs
3	New Mexico United U23	12	5	2	5	23	19	+4	17	1.42	
4	Salt City SC	12	4	2	6	21	27	−6	14	1.17	
5	CISA	12	1	2	9	12	28	−16	5	0.42	

Source: USL

==== Northwest Division ====
Pos	Team	Pld	W	D	L	GF	GA	GD	Pts	PPG	Qualification
1	Capital FC	12	8	3	1	25	14	+11	27	2.25	Advance to USL League Two Playoffs
2	Ballard FC	12	8	2	2	28	12	+16	26	2.17	Advance to USL League Two Playoffs
3	Lane United FC	12	3	6	3	19	18	+1	15	1.25	
4	Oly Town FC	12	3	2	7	16	25	−9	11 (Note: Oly Town FC wins the tiebreaker over OVF Alliance on Head-to-head record.)	0.92	
5	OVF Alliance	12	3	2	7	24	21	+3	11	0.92	
6	PDX FC	12	3	1	8	12	34	−22	10	0.83	

Source: USL

==== Southwest Division ====
Pos	Team	Pld	W	D	L	GF	GA	GD	Pts	PPG	Qualification
1	Project 51O	12	8	2	2	25	13	+12	26 (Note: Project 51O wins the tiebreaker over Ventura County Fusion on Head-to-head record.)	2.17	Advance to USL League Two Playoffs
2	Ventura County Fusion	12	8	2	2	24	15	+9	26	2.17	Advance to USL League Two Playoffs
3	Southern California Seahorses	12	6	5	1	21	15	+6	23	1.92	Advance to USL League Two Playoffs
4	San Francisco Glens SC	12	6	3	3	27	12	+15	21	1.75	Advance to USL League Two Playoffs
5	Davis Legacy SC	12	4	4	4	26	24	+2	16	1.33	
6	Marin FC Legends	12	4	2	6	20	18	+2	14	1.17	
7	Central Valley Fuego FC 2	12	2	2	8	11	36	−25	8	0.67	
8	San Francisco City FC	12	1	3	8	13	27	−14	6	0.50	
9	FC Golden State Force	12	1	5	6	12	19	−7	5	0.42	

Source: USL

== Playoffs ==
=== Bracket ===
Conference Quarterfinals	Conference Semifinals
E1	Lionsbridge FC	1
E8	Vermont Green FC	2
E8	Vermont Green FC	1
E5	Long Island Rough Riders	2
E4	Ocean City Nor'easters	1
E5	Long Island Rough Riders	3
Eastern Conference
E2	Seacoast United Phantoms	4
E7	Christos FC	1
E2	Seacoast United Phantoms (a.e.t.)	1
E6	Western Mass Pioneers	0
E3	Manhattan SC	0
E6	Western Mass Pioneers	1
S2	North Carolina Fusion U23 (p)	1 (5)
S7	The Villages SC	1 (4)
S2	North Carolina Fusion U23	2
S6	Asheville City SC	1
S3	Brazos Valley Cavalry FC	0
S6	Asheville City SC	3
Southern Conference
S1	NONA FC	1
S8	West Virginia United	2
S8	West Virginia United	0
S4	One Knoxville SC	2
S4	One Knoxville SC (a.e.t.)	4
S5	Texas United	2
C1	Des Moines Menace	4
C6	Kaw Valley FC	0
C1	Des Moines Menace	4
C5	Kings Hammer FC	1
C5	Kings Hammer FC (p)	2 (6)
C4	Kalamazoo FC	2 (5)
Central Conference
C2	Chicago FC United	3
C8	Peoria City	1
C2	Chicago FC United	1
C7	Flint City Bucks	2
C3	South Bend Lions	1
C7	Flint City Bucks	3
W1	Capital FC	2
W8	San Francisco Glens	3
W8	San Francisco Glens	2
W4	Ballard FC (a.e.t.)	3
W4	Ballard FC	2
W3	Project 51O	1
Western Conference
W5	Ventura County Fusion	3
W6	Flatirons Rush SC	2
W5	Ventura County Fusion	2
W7	Southern California Seahorses	1
W2	Park City Red Wolves	1
W7	Southern California Seahorses	3

Conference Finals
E5	Long Island Rough Riders (a.e.t.)	2
E2	Seacoast United Phantoms	1
S2	North Carolina Fusion U23	2
S4	One Knoxville SC	1
C1	Des Moines Menace	1 (4)
C7	Flint City Bucks (p)	1 (5)
W4	Ballard FC	0
W5	Ventura County Fusion	1

National Semifinals
E5	Long Island Rough Riders	2
S2	North Carolina Fusion U23	0
C7	Flint City Bucks	0
W5	Ventura County Fusion	1

National Final
E5	Long Island Rough Riders	1
W5	Ventura County Fusion	2

== Conference Playoffs ==
=== Eastern Conference ===
July 22, 2022 Conference Quarterfinals	Seacoast United Phantoms	4–1	Christos FC	Lusitano Stadium; Ludlow, Massachusetts
4:30 PM EDT	Musu 3'; Sharp 5'; Sing 47'; Showunmi 72' (yellow card); Black (yellow card)	Report	Stitz 70'; Panton (yellow card); Travers (yellow card); Stephenson (yellow card)

July 22, 2022 Conference Quarterfinals	Ocean City Nor'easters	1–3	Long Island Rough Riders	TowneBank Stadium; Newport News, Virginia
5:00 PM EDT	Myers 29'; Marques (yellow card); Kocevski (yellow card)	Report	Vowinkel 71'; Carmichael 84'; Weiss 89'; Cavallo (yellow card)

July 22, 2022 Conference Quarterfinals	Lionsbridge FC	1–2	Vermont Green FC	TowneBank Stadium; Newport News, Virginia
7:30 PM EDT	Hall 45' (pen.) (yellow card); Materazzi (yellow card)	Report	Adams 38'; Cloherty (yellow card) 13' (yellow-red card) 59'; Pfeifer (yellow card) 61'; McCann 63'

July 22, 2022 Conference Quarterfinals	Western Mass Pioneers	1–0	Manhattan SC	Lusitano Stadium; Ludlow, Massachusetts
7:30 PM EDT	Armero 45' (yellow card); Rodrigues (red card); Arriagada (yellow card) (yellow-red card); Oberrauch (yellow card); Brinkman (yellow card)	Report	Martin (yellow card); Urrea (yellow card); Collins (yellow card); Rogers (yellow card)

July 24, 2022 Conference Semifinal	Long Island Rough Riders	2–1	Vermont Green FC	TowneBank Stadium; Newport News, Virginia
7:00 PM EDT	Vowinkel 25'; Carmichael 50'; Puig (yellow card); Middlebrook (yellow card)	Report	Tobin 38'; Beaulieu (yellow card); Adams (yellow card); Pacella (yellow card); Nwegbo (yellow card)

July 24, 2022 Conference Semifinal	Western Mass Pioneers	0–1 (a.e.t.)	Seacoast United Phantoms	Lusitano Stadium; Ludlow, Massachusetts
7:00 PM EDT	Gutierrez (yellow card); Brinkman (yellow card) (yellow-red card); Lerech (yellow card); Hicks (yellow card); Valadez (yellow card)	Report	Black (yellow card); Musu (yellow card); Healy (yellow card); Burgess (yellow card); Sharp 102'

July 29, 2022 Conference Final	Seacoast United Phantoms	1–2 (a.e.t.)	Long Island Rough Riders	Austin-East High School; Knoxville, Tennessee
4:30 PM EDT	Sharp 62' (yellow card); Showunmi (yellow card); Bertos (yellow card)	Report	O'Malley (yellow card); Puig (yellow card); Cutler (yellow card); Carmichael 77'; Vowinkel 117'

=== Southern Conference ===
July 22, 2022 Conference Quarterfinals	Brazos Valley Cavalry F.C.	0–3	Asheville City SC	The Villages SC Complex; The Villages, Florida
4:00 PM EDT		Report	Huerman 38'; Gonzalez 54'; McBride 83'

July 22, 2022 Conference Quarterfinals	Nona FC	1–2	West Virginia United	West High School; Knoxville, Tennessee
4:30 PM EDT	45'	Report	Osumanu (yellow card); Maeda 45'; Smith 53'

July 22, 2022 Conference Quarterfinals	The Villages SC	1–1 (4–5 p)	North Carolina Fusion U23	The Villages SC Complex; The Villages, Florida
7:00 PM EDT	Murtha (yellow card); Amaral 38'; Cardona (yellow card)	Report	Pellio 19' (yellow card); Horveno (yellow card) (yellow-red card); Gomiero (yellow card); Clow (yellow card); Mayer (yellow card)

July 22, 2022 Conference Quarterfinals	One Knoxville SC	4–2 (a.e.t.)	Texas United	West High School; Knoxville, Tennessee
7:30 PM EDT	Thomas 50', 86'; Afrifa 100'; Abril 117'	Report 1Report 2	Reyes (yellow card); Jara (yellow card); Estrada (yellow card); Jaaskelainen 52'; Romero 90'	Attendance: 2,342

July 24, 2022 Conference Semifinal	North Carolina Fusion U23	2–1	Asheville City SC	The Villages SC Complex; The Villages, Florida
7:00 PM EDT	Duval 35', 81'; Wiemann (yellow card); Gomiero (yellow card); Mayer (yellow card); McDonald (yellow card)	Report	Cerezo 54'; Ward (yellow card); Huerman (yellow card)

July 24, 2022 Conference Semifinal	One Knoxville SC	2–0	West Virginia United	West High School; Knoxville, Tennessee
7:30PM EDT	Sunesson 6'; Afrifa 64'	Report 2	Clark (yellow card)

July 29, 2022 Conference Final	One Knoxville SC	1–2	North Carolina Fusion U23	Austin-East Magnet High School; Knoxville, Tennessee
7:30 PM EDT	Fernandez 48'	Report 1Report 2	Duval 7'; Gamiz 83'; Varela (yellow card); McDonald (yellow card)

=== Central Conference ===
July 22, 2022 Conference Quarterfinals	Chicago FC United	3–1	Peoria City	Atwood Stadium; Flint, Michigan
4:00 PM CDT	Johnson; Hency	Report	Ennin

July 22, 2022 Conference Quarterfinals	Kalamazoo FC	2–2 (a.e.t.) (5–6 p)	Kings Hammer FC	Valley Stadium; West Des Moines, Iowa
4:00 PM CDT	Levey (yellow card); Whelan (yellow card); Strine (yellow card); Efang (yellow card); Lara 103'; Whelan 119'	Report	Territo (yellow card); Pineda (yellow card); Garvey 105'; Damge 108'
	Penalties
	Whelan (penalty scored); Bayless (penalty missed); O'Riordan (penalty missed); D'argento (penalty scored); Harmon (penalty scored); Efang (penalty missed); Lara (penalty scored); Calvo-Salinas (penalty missed); Lockwood (penalty scored); Strine (penalty missed)		(penalty scored) Allbaugh; (penalty missed) Robinson; (penalty scored) Territo; (penalty scored) Burlew; (penalty missed) Hernandez; (penalty missed) Rinehart; (penalty scored) Damge; (penalty missed) Hegge; (penalty scored) Garvey; (penalty scored) Ayertey

July 22, 2022 Conference Quarterfinals	Flint City Bucks	3–1	South Bend Lions	Atwood Stadium; Flint, Michigan
7:00 PM CDT	Dallmann 39'; Slade 45'; Cisse 56'; Fearnley (yellow card)	Report	De Oliveira (yellow card); Tanor (yellow card); Shannon 90'

July 22, 2022 Conference Quarterfinals	Des Moines Menace	4–0	Kaw Valley FC	Valley Stadium; West Des Moines, Iowa
7:00 PM CDT	Goldthorp 33', 62'; Brewer Jr 55'; Bermingham 81'	Report	Dias (red card); Keita (red card)

July 24, 2022 Conference Semifinal	Flint City Bucks	2–1	Chicago FC United	Atwood Stadium; Flint, Michigan
5:00 PM CDT	Bacharach (yellow card); Cisse 29', 35'; Fearnley (yellow card)	Report	Johnson 81'

July 24, 2022 Conference Semifinal	Des Moines Menace	4–1	Kings Hammer FC	Valley Stadium; West Des Moines, Iowa
7:00 PM CDT	Kraft 40'; Goldthorp 45'; Bermingham 61'; D'Agostini 88'	Report	Hegge (yellow card) (goal) 83'; Pineda (yellow card)	Attendance: 2,417

July 29, 2022 Conference Final	Des Moines Menace	1–1 (4–5 p)	Flint City Bucks	Valley Stadium; West Des Moines, Iowa
7:15 PM CDT	Goldthorp 3'	Report 1 Report 2	Slade 57'; Bacharach (yellow card); Eneli (yellow card); Shefqeti (yellow card); Quaynor (yellow card); Mimy (yellow card)	Attendance: 4,567
	Penalties
	D'Agostini (penalty missed); Padilla (penalty scored); Cupid (penalty scored); Rozeboom (penalty scored); Bermingham (penalty scored)		(penalty scored) Trujillo; (penalty scored) Cisse; (penalty scored) Kyra; (penalty scored) Mahlmeister; (penalty scored) Bacharach

=== Western Conference ===
July 22, 2022 Conference Quarterfinals	Capital FC	2–3	San Francisco Glens SC	Interbay Stadium; Seattle, Washington
2:00 PM PDT	Sosa 72'; Tibbling 78'; Greenlee (yellow card)	Report	Chretien 18', 83'; Mahi 77'

July 22, 2022 Conference Quarterfinals	Southern California Seahorses	3–1	Park City Red Wolves SC	Ventura College Sportsplex; Ventura, California
4:30 PM PDT	De La Torre Jr (yellow card); Garfias; Barbosa; Santana	Report	Nicolas; Soyemi-Ololade (yellow card)

July 22, 2022 Conference Quarterfinals	Ballard FC	2–1	Project 51O	Interbay Stadium; Seattle, Washington
7:00 PM PDT	Gaffney 37'; McGlynn 49' (yellow card) 85'; Burney (yellow card) 65'; Kingston (yellow card) 67' (yellow-red card) 90+1'	Report	Mariona (yellow card) 5'; Hernandez 78'

July 22, 2022 Conference Quarterfinals	Ventura County Fusion	3–2	Flatirons Rush SC	Ventura College Sportsplex; Ventura, California
7:00 PM PDT	Villapando 17'; Edwards 20', 70'; Farrington (yellow card); Opoku (yellow card); Calderon (yellow card)	Report	Caliari 30'; Trujillo 90'

July 24, 2022 Conference Semifinal	Ballard FC	3–2 (a.e.t.)	San Francisco Glens SC	Interbay Stadium; Seattle, Washington
2:00 PM PDT	Engmann 12'; Mejia 37', 109'; McGlynn (yellow card) 59'; letherman (yellow card) 85'	Report	Grande 33' (yellow card) 93'; Bilter (yellow card) 70'; Valdivia 87'; Chretien (yellow card)

July 24, 2022 Conference Semifinal	Southern California Seahorses	1–2	Ventura County Fusion	Whittier College; Whittier, California
4:00 PM PDT	Barbosa 75'; Amadin (yellow card); Echeverria (yellow card); Hornung (yellow card); Ihara (yellow card)	Report	Opoku 17'; Villapando 64'

July 29, 2022 Conference Final	Ballard FC	0–1	Ventura County Fusion	Valley Stadium; West Des Moines, Iowa
3:00 PM CDT	Engmann (yellow card) 62'; Dale (yellow card) 69'	Report	Farrington 28' (pen.); Alvarez (yellow card) 29'; Villapando (yellow card) 75'

== USL League Two Championship ==
=== Semifinals ===
July 31, 2022 National Semifinal	Ventura County Fusion	1–0	Flint City Bucks	Valley Stadium; West Des Moines, Iowa
7:15 PM CDT	Opoku 40'; Oberli (yellow card); Madrigal (yellow card)	Report	Dallmann (yellow card) 42'; Slade (yellow card) 56'; Eneli (yellow card); Quaynor (yellow card); Cekrezi (yellow card); Hepburn (yellow card)

August 1, 2022 National Semifinal	North Carolina Fusion U23	0–2	Long Island Rough Riders	Austin-East Magnet High School; Knoxville, Tennessee
10:00 AM EDT	Pellio (yellow card); Duval (yellow card)	Report	Vowinkel 45'; Thiesen 52'; Petridis (yellow card)

=== USL League Two Championship Game ===
August 6, 2022
7:00 PM PDT
National Final

Ventura County Fusion	2–1	Long Island Rough Riders
Villapando (yellow card); Opoku 60'; Edwards 84'	Report	Cavallo (yellow card) 49'; Weiss 55'; Puig (yellow card); DiLuzio (yellow card) 68'

Ventura College Sportsplex
Ventura, California
Referee: Trevor Wiseman

Championship MVP: (Ghana) Nathaniel Opoku (VCF)

== Awards ==
=== Year End Awards ===
Award	Winner	Team	Reason	Ref.
Defender of the Year	(Trinidad and Tobago) Samory Powder	Hudson Valley Hammers	6 goals; 6 assists	
Golden Glove	(Germany) Felix Schäfer	Ocean City Nor’easters	0.59 Goals Against Average; 5 Shutouts; 88.9% Save percentage	
Young (U20) Player of the Year	(United States) Joseph DiPreta	Blackwatch Rush	1 goal; 2 assists in 13 games	
Assists Champion	(United States) Ben Stitz	Christos FC	12 Assists	
Golden Boot	(United States) Ethan Stevenson	Brazos Valley Cavalry FC	19 Goals in 13 games	
Player of the Year	(Trinidad and Tobago) Samory Powder	Hudson Valley Hammers	6 goals; 6 assists	
Coach of the Year	(England) Dean Johnson	Des Moines Menace	10-0-2 Regular season record	
Goal of the Year	(Japan) Shion Soga	AFC Ann Arbor	vs Oakland County FC	
Save of the Year	(United States) Brandt Herron	Virginia Beach United	vs Northern Virginia FC	

=== Monthly Awards ===
Team of the Month
Month	Goalkeeper	Defenders	Midfielders	Forwards	Ref.
May	(United States) Wnorowski (RCNJ)	(Trinidad and Tobago) Cupid (DMM) (United States) DeBolt (FCB) (Scotland) McRobb (KNX)	(United States) Skinner (CI2) (Brazil) Gomeiro (NCF) (United States) Gilbey (LIR) (Republic of Ireland) Broughan (KAL)	(United States) Stitz (CHR) (Trinidad and Tobago) Weston (LAK) (United States) Vowinkel (LIR)	
June	(United States) Sutton (MAN)	(France) Horveno (NCF) (Canada) Smith (DMM) (Italy) Franceschini (NON) (Trinidad and Tobago) Powder (HVH)	(United States) Castro (CFU) (Cameroon) Ngando (SGT2) (United States) Lombard (RCNJ) (United States) Stevenson (BVC)	(Spain) Serra (CFU) (United States) Rinehart (KGH)	

Goal of the Month
Month	Player	Club	Opponent	Ref.
May	(Liberia) Cyrus Harmon	Kalamazoo FC	AFC Ann Arbor	
June	(Japan) Shion Shoga	AFC Ann Arbor	Oakland County FC	

Save of the Month
Month	Player	Club	Opponent	Ref.
May	(United States) Brandt Herron	Virginia Beach United	Northern Virginia FC	
June	(United States) Alexander Pearce	Caledonia SC	Florida Elite Soccer Academy	

=== Weekly Awards ===
Goal of the Week
Week	Player	Club	Opponent	Ref.
1/2	(United States) Fernando Garcia	Des Moines Menace	St. Croix Legends	
3	(England) Kenny Brown	Round Rock SC	AHFC Royals	
4	(Liberia) Cyrus Harmon	Kalamazoo FC	AFC Ann Arbor	
5	(United States) Declan McGlynn	Ballard FC	Oly Town FC	
6	(United States) Diego Grande	San Francisco Glens SC	Ventura County Fusion	
7	(England) Ryan Crooks	West Virginia United	Tobacco Road FC	
8	(Japan) Shion Shoga	AFC Ann Arbor	Oakland County FC	
9	(United States) Curt Calov	AFC Ann Arbor	Lansing City Football	
10/11	(Italy) Alessandro Arlotti	Ocean City Noreasters	Philadelphia Lone Star FC	

Save of the Week
1/2	(United States) Brandt Herron	Virginia Beach United	Northern Virginia FC
3	(United States) Martin Sanchez	Minneapolis City SC	Peoria City
4	(United States) Mitchell Budler	Florida Elite Soccer Academy	Tampa Bay United
5	(United States) Sawyer Price	Oly Town FC	Lane United FC
6	(United States) Alexander Pearce	Caledonia SC	Florida Elite Soccer Academy
7	(Canada) Evan Barker	FC Manitoba	Minneapolis City SC
8	(Canada) Evan Barker	FC Manitoba	Des Moines Menace
9	(New Zealand) Max Collingwood	West Virginia United	North Carolina FC U23

== All-League and All-Conference Teams ==
=== Eastern Conference ===
F: (United States) Ben Stitz (CHR), (Northern Ireland) Ryan Carmichael (LIR), (Guinea-Bissau) Braudilio Rodrigues (WMP) *
M: (United States) Taig Healy (SUP), (Nigeria) Diba Nwegbo (VER), (United States) Peter Stroud (MOT/TOB) *
D: (Canada) Moise Bombito (SUP) *, (Germany) Bjarne Thiesen (LIR) *, (Italy) Nicolas Oberrauch (WMP), (Trinidad and Tobago) Samory Powder (HVH) *
G: (Netherlands) Wessel Speel (LIR) *

=== Southern Conference ===
F: (United States) Ethan Stevenson (BVC), (Trinidad and Tobago) Quesi Weston (LAK), (France) Kemy Amiche (ASH) *
M: (England) Tom Marriott (SCU), (Brazil) Joao Gomiero (NCF) *, (Cameroon) JC Ngando (SGT)
D: (United States) Joel Sangwa (NONA), (Germany) Ben Weimann (NCF), (Central African Republic) Bissaffi Dotte (ASH), (Ghana) Moses Mensah (KNOX) *
G: (New Zealand) Max Collingwood (WVU)

=== Central Conference ===
F: (Brazil) Kainan Dos Santos (SBL), (United States) Telvin Vah (STC), (Republic of Ireland) Matt Whelan (KAL)
M: (United States) Curt Calov (AAA), (England) Eliot Goldthorp (DMM), (United States) Ryley Kraft (DMM) *
D: (United States) Tyler Freitas (PEO), (Trinidad and Tobago) Kori Cupid (DMM), (Sweden) Tom Abrahamsson (FTW), (Spain) Hugo Bacharach (FCB)
G: (Canada) Evan Barker (FCM)

=== Western Conference ===
F: (United States) Logan Farrington (VCF), (United States) Ian Mejia (BAL), (Ghana) Nathaniel Opoku (VCF) *
M: (United States) Kevyn Lo (SFG), (Canada) Marley Edwards (VCF), (United States) Jose Sosa (CAP)
D: (Lesotho) Lesia Thetsane (BAL), (Spain) Javi Ruiz Duran (51O), (England) Kolade Salaudeen (OVF), (South Africa) Robin Terry (LUN)
G: (United States) Jason Smith (PCW)

* denotes All-League player
