= Massimo Morales =

Italian football manager (born 1964)

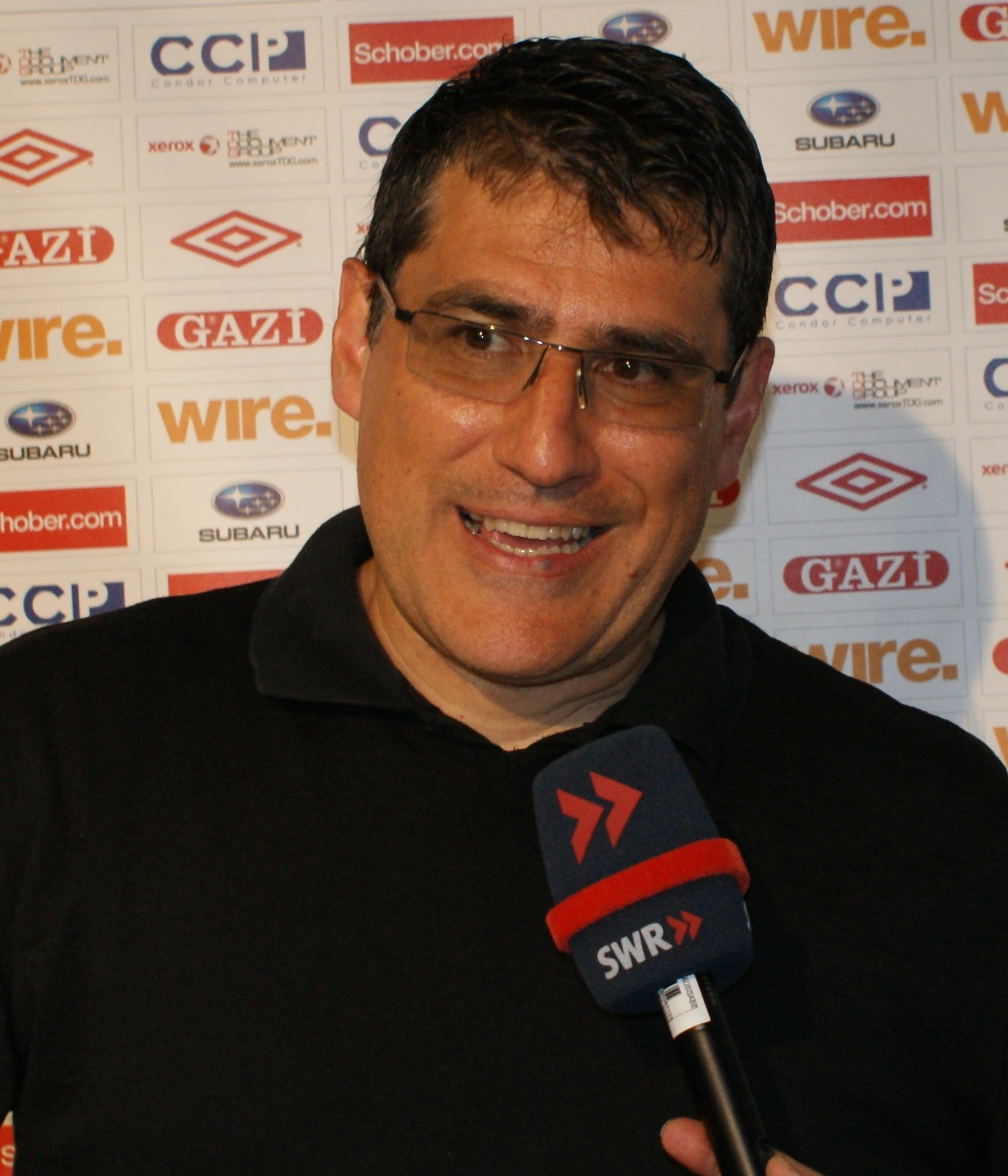
- Morales in 2013

Personal information
- Date of birth: 20 April 1964 (age 62)
- Place of birth: Caserta, Italy

Senior career*
Years	Team	Apps	(Gls)
- Casertana

Managerial career
- 1995–1996: King Faisal Babes
- 1999: De Graafschap
- 2000–2001: Potenza
- 2001: Bellinzona
- 2001–2002: Rondinella
- 2002: Varese
- 2003–2004: Fortuna Düsseldorf
- 2005–2006: Waldhof Mannheim
- 2008–2009: 1. FK Příbram
- 2009–2010: Budapest Honvéd
- 2013: Stuttgarter Kickers
- 2019–2020: Daytona SC
- 2022: Brescia Women
- * Club domestic league appearances and goals

Massimo Morales (born 20 April 1964) is an Italian football manager.

== Coaching career ==
Morales was born in Caserta. He managed 1. FK Příbram from March 2008, and led the Czech team to 2nd place in Czech 2. Liga, thus ensuring promotion back to the national top flight. On 5 May 2009 1. FK Příbram owner Jaroslav Starka and the Italian coach mutually decided to part ways because the club was delaying the payment of the salaries. On 29 October 2009, he was named as the new head coach of Budapest Honvéd, replacing Tibor Sisa. In season 2010, after Újpest FC defeated his team, he resigned.

He later worked for the staff of English team Watford.

In 2019 he was named head coach of Daytona SC.

He successively served as head coach of Brescia Women from June to September 2022.

== Career ==
Coaching career history

Club	Period	Role
ESV München	1991	Youth team coach (18-year old)
FC Bayern Munich	1992–1994	Youth team coach (16-year old)
FC Bayern Munich	1994–1995	Giovanni Trapattoni's assistant coach
King Faisal Babes	1995–1996	Head coach
A.C. Milan	1996–1998	Scout
Ghana national football team	1998–1999	Assistant coach
De Graafschap	1999	Head coach
F.C. Potenza	2000–2001	Head coach (Serie D)
AC Bellinzona	2001	Head coach (Nationalliga B)
Rondinella Calcio	2001–2002	Head coach (Serie C2)
A.S. Varese 1910	2002	Head coach (Serie C1)
Fortuna Düsseldorf	2003–2004	Head coach
SV Waldhof Mannheim	2005–2006	Head coach
1. FK Příbram	2008–2009	Head coach
Budapest Honvéd	2009–2010	Head coach
SV Stuttgarter Kickers	2013	Head coach
Daytona SC	2019–	Head coach
