= Flatirons FC =

American soccer team

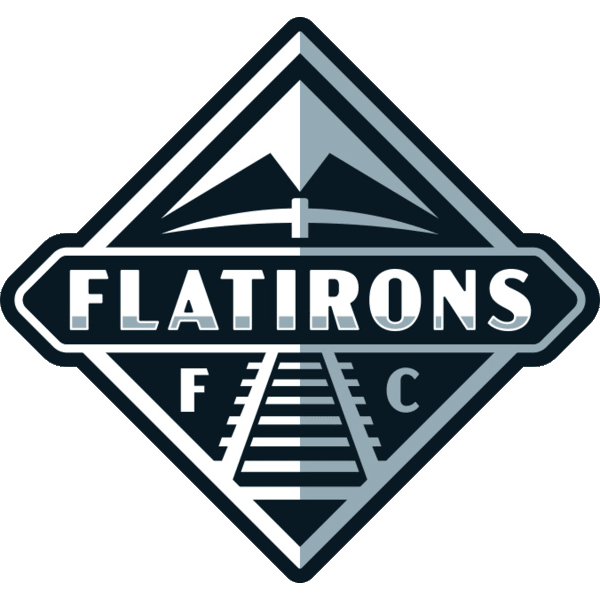
- Full name: Flatirons Football Club
- Founded: 2017; 9 years ago
- Stadium: Stermole Stadium; Colorado School of Mines
- Capacity: 550
- Owner: Yo Leven Sports
- President: Joe Webb
- Head Coach: Men's: Levi Rossi; Women's: Marina Schachowskoj
- League: USL League Two; USL W League
- 2025 m 2025 w: 4th of Mountain Division (both, men's and women's)
- Website: flatironsfc.com
Home colours	Away colours

Flatirons Football Club is a pre-professional soccer club based in Superior, Colorado, with a men's side that competes in the Mountain Division of USL League Two and a women's side that also competes in the Mountain Division, but in the USL W League. It was formerly known as Flatirons Rush SC, and before that as Colorado Rush SC, a name now used primarily for separately affiliated academies in Littleton, Colorado.

== History ==
The club history dates back to 2017, the roots of the club started as the Colorado Rush Men's Team. In 2018, Yo-Leven Sports was awarded a United Soccer League Two Franchise. The franchise rebranded in 2022 to share branding with the affiliated youth academy the club started in Arvada, Colorado. They are owned by Yo Leven Sports, LLC and affiliated with Rush Soccer who also back Four other USL2 sides – Cedar Stars Rush, Daytona Rush SC, Virginia Beach United and the League2 Ontario club Rush Canada.

The men's side was set to join USL League Two for the 2020 season, but the season was canceled due to the COVID-19 pandemic. They served as the only Colorado-based team in the league for a season, filling the gap left when the Colorado Rapids U-23 departed the league, following the 2018 PDL season.

In February 2023, the club announced that it would field a women's side in the WPSL. It succeeded the previous Rush-backed Colorado WPSL team, Colorado Rush Women, which was based in Littleton, Colorado.

In 2024, the women's side moved to the USL W League, and the club underwent a rebrand as Flatirons FC. The men's side captured its first division title, qualifying for both the USL League Two playoffs and the 2025 U.S. Open Cup. The men fell to eventual national semifinalists FC Tucson in the conference quarterfinals, 3-2.

In the 2025 U.S. Open Cup, the Flatirons hosted USL League One team Union Omaha in the first round of the tournament. The match finished 2-1 in favor of the professional team, knocking Flatirons out.

== Year-by-year ==
=== Men's ===
Year	League	Regular season	Playoffs	Open Cup
Colorado Rush SC
2020	USL League Two	Season canceled due to COVID-19 pandemic		
2021	USL League Two	2nd, Mountain	did not qualify	did not qualify
Flatirons Rush SC
2022	USL League Two	2nd, Mountain	Conference Quarterfinals	did not qualify
2023	USL League Two	5th, Mountain	did not qualify	did not qualify
Flatirons FC
2024	USL League Two	1st, Mountain	Conference Quarterfinals	1st Round
2025	USL League Two	4th, Mountain	did not qualify	did not qualify
2026	USL League Two	7th, Mountain	did not qualify	did not qualify

=== Women's ===
Year	League	Regular season	Playoffs
2023	WPSL	5th, Central Mountain Rockies	DNQ
2024	USLW	4th, Mountain	DNQ
2025	USLW	4th, Mountain	DNQ
2026	USLW	5th, Mountain	DNQ

== Honors ==
- 2024 Mountain Division Champions (USL League Two)
- Daisuke Takanaka: 2024 Mountain Division Player of the Year
