= Cedar Stars Rush =

- Full name: Cedar Stars Rush
- Founded: September 19, 2018; 7 years ago
- Stadium: Fairleigh Dickinson University; Teaneck, New Jersey
- Owner: Cedar Stars Academy/Rush Soccer
- Head Coach: Juan Santamaria
- League: USL League Two
- 2024: 6th, Metropolitan Division; Playoffs: DNQ
- Website: cedarstarsrush.com
Home colours	Away colours

Cedar Stars Rush are an American soccer club competing in the USL League Two. They are owned by Cedar Stars Academy which has numerous branches in the Tri-State area with the two primary locations being in Bergen County, NJ (Boys U8–U19/Girls U8–U19) and Monmouth County, NJ (Boys U8–U19/ Girls U13–U19). They are an official member club of the MLS Next which is a youth soccer league in the United States and Canada, that is managed, organized and controlled by Major League Soccer. They are also owned by Rush Soccer, who also back three other USL2 sides – Colorado Rush SC, Daytona Rush SC, Virginia Beach United.

== Coaching staff ==
=== Staff ===
Executive
Majority owner and President	George Altirs
Coaching staff
Head coach/Sporting Director	Juan Santamaria
Assistant coach	Kieran Patrick
Assistant Coach	Michael Custidiano
Goalkeeper Coach	Sebastian Andersen

== Year-by-year ==
=== Men's team ===
Year	Division	League	Reg. season	Playoffs	Open Cup
2019	4	USL League Two	5th, Mid Atlantic	did not qualify	did not enter
2020	4	USL League Two	Season cancelled due to COVID-19 pandemic		
2021	4	USL League Two	2nd, Metropolitan	Conference Quarterfinals	did not enter
2022	4	USL League Two	6th, Metropolitan	did not qualify	did not qualify
2023	4	USL League Two	5th, Metropolitan	did not qualify	did not qualify
2024	4	USL League Two	6th, Metropolitan	did not qualify	did not qualify
2025	4	USL League Two	5th, Metropolitan	did not qualify	did not qualify
2026	4	USL League Two	4th, Metropolitan	did not qualify	did not qualify

=== Women's team ===
Year	Division	League	Reg. season	Playoffs
2022	4	USL W League	4th, Metropolitan	did not qualify
2023	4	USL W League	3rd, Metropolitan	did not qualify
2024	4	USL W League	4th, Metropolitan	did not qualify
2025	4	USL W League	4th, Metropolitan	did not qualify
2026	4	USL W League	4th, Metropolitan	did not qualify
