= Kobe Perez =

American soccer player (born 1997)

Personal information
- Full name: Kobe Emilio Perez
- Date of birth: April 10, 1997 (age 29)
- Place of birth: Dalton, Georgia, US
- Height: 1.83 m (6 ft 0 in)
- Position: Central midfielder

College career
Years	Team	Apps	(Gls)
2015–2018	Mercer Bears	60	(9)

Senior career*
Years	Team	Apps	(Gls)
2019	South Georgia Tormenta 2	14	(3)
2019	South Georgia Tormenta	1	(0)
2020	Union Omaha	0	(0)
2021	South Georgia Tormenta	26	(2)
- * Club domestic league appearances and goals as of November 2, 2021

Kobe Emilio Perez (born April 10, 1997) is an American professional soccer player who plays as a midfielder.

== Career ==
=== High school ===
Perez played three years for the Dalton High Catamounts. The Catamounts went 64-0-1 in 65 games, outscoring their opponents 367–31 in the process and winning three consecutive state titles.

=== College & amateur ===
Following high school, Perez played four years of collegiate soccer at Mercer University. As a creative attacking midfielder, he made 60 appearances for the Bears, aiding Mercer in back-to-back NCAA Tournament appearances in 2016 & 2017, and securing a Southern Conference championship in 2018.

Following college, Perez made his summer league debut for USL League Two side South Georgia Tormenta 2. Perez was instrumental during Tormenta 2's inaugural season. T2 trounced USL League One professional side Chattanooga Red Wolves in the U.S. Open Cup 3–0, then captured the League Two Southern Conference Championship, and advanced to the USL 2 National Semifinals.

=== Professional ===
On August 1, 2019, Perez signed a two-month summer contract with USL League One side South Georgia Tormenta.

On January 14, 2020, Perez was signed by USL League One expansion side Union Omaha.

On August 7, 2020, Perez left Union Omaha by mutual agreement with the club.

Perez re-joined USL League One side South Georgia Tormenta on January 12, 2021.
