= Tormenta FC 2 =

American soccer club in Statesboro, Georgia

- Full name: South Georgia Tormenta Football Club 2
- Nickname: Twomenta
- Founded: January 23, 2019; 7 years ago
- Stadium: Optim Sports Medicine Field; Statesboro, Georgia
- Capacity: 5,300
- Co-Owners: Darin Van Tassell; Netra Van Tassell; Jeff Spencer
- Head Coach: Tom Morris
- League: USL League Two
- 2022: 3rd, South Central Division; Playoffs: DNQ
- Website: https://www.tormentafc.com/tormentafc2
Home colors	Away colors

South Georgia Tormenta FC 2, officially known as Tormenta FC 2, is an American soccer team based in Statesboro, Georgia, United States. Founded in 2019, the club fields a pre-professional team in USL League Two, the fourth tier of the American Soccer Pyramid. They are the reserve club of USL League One team South Georgia Tormenta FC. Tormenta FC 2 is known by the nickname Twomenta, a play on the word Tormenta and the number 2. The team went on a one-year hiatus for the 2023 USL League Two season.

== History ==
The club was founded in 2019, when South Georgia Tormenta FC, which previously competed in the Premier Development League from 2016 through 2018, moved up to the professional divisions, joining the newly formed third-tier USL League One. Tormenta FC 2 was created to fill the vacated spot.

In 2019, they defended the Deep South Division title, which was won by the first team in 2018. They won the South Division playoffs, defeating Southeast Division champions The Villages SC and then Midsouth Division champions Brazos Valley Cavalry F.C. in the Conference playoffs, before falling to Eastern Conference champions Reading United AC in the National Semi-finals. Earlier in the season, they competed in the 2019 U.S. Open Cup where they defeated professional club Chattanooga Red Wolves of USL League One in the first round, before being defeated by USL Championship side Nashville SC in the next round.

== Year-by-year ==
Year	League	Regular season	Playoffs	U.S. Open Cup
Tormenta FC (Note: Tormenta 2 was founded in 2019. However, the history of the PDL squad between 2016 and 2018 is shared between both the first and reserve teams.)
2016	Premier Development League	5th, South Atlantic	Did not qualify	Ineligible
2017	Premier Development League	4th, South Atlantic	Did not qualify	Did not qualify
2018	Premier Development League	1st, Deep South	Conference Semifinals	Second Round
Tormenta FC 2
2019	USL League Two	1st, Deep South	National Semifinals	Second Round
2020	USL League Two	Season cancelled due to the COVID-19 pandemic		Cancelled
2021	USL League Two	2nd, Deep South	Conference Final	Cancelled
2022	3rd, South Central	Did not qualify	Did not qualify	

== Honors ==
USL League Two
Deep South Division Champion: 2018, 2019
Southern Conference Champion: 2019
