= Dalton Red Wolves SC =

American soccer team

- Full name: Dalton Red Wolves Soccer Club U23
- Founded: December 28, 2018; 7 years ago
- Stadium: Lakeshore Park; Dalton, Georgia
- Owners: Bob & Lana Martino
- Head coach: Saif Alsafeer
- League: USL League Two
- 2023: 4th, South Central Division; Playoffs: DNQ
- Website: https://www.chattanoogaredwolves-sc.com/dalton
Home colors

Dalton Red Wolves SC are an American soccer club in Dalton, Georgia competing in the USL League Two. They are an affiliate team of USL League One club Chattanooga Red Wolves.

== History ==
The club was founded in 2018 by the Chattanooga Red Wolves to serve as one of their affiliate clubs. The Park City Red Wolves were formed at the same time, as another affiliate. Both affiliates would operate as U23 teams and play in the fourth tier USL League Two. Dalton plans to use primarily local talent to make up their roster. They finished 3rd in the Deep South division in their inaugural season, missing out on the opportunity to qualify for the 2020 U.S. Open Cup. The club will be moving to a new stadium in nearby East Ridge, Tennessee when construction finishes.

== Year-by-year ==
Year	Division	League	Reg. season	Playoffs	Open Cup
2019	4	USL League Two	3rd, Deep South	did not qualify	did not qualify
2020	4	USL League Two	Season canceled due to COVID-19 pandemic		
2021	4	USL League Two	8th, Deep South	did not qualify	did not qualify
2022	4	USL League Two	8th, South Central	did not qualify	did not qualify
2023	4	USL League Two	4th, South Central	did not qualify	did not qualify
