= Tri-Cities Otters =

Defunct amateur soccer team based in Johnson City, Tennessee

- Full name: Tri-Cities Football Club
- Nickname(s): Otters
- Founded: June 28, 2016; 9 years ago
- Dissolved: December 12, 2022; 2 years ago
- Stadium: TVA Credit Union Ballpark; Johnson City, Tennessee
- Owner: Otter Soccer, LLC
- Head Coach: David Strickland
- League: USL League Two
- 2022: 4th, South Central Division; Playoffs: DNQ
- Website: http://www.ottersoccer.com/
Home colours

The Tri-Cities Otters were an amateur American soccer club based in Johnson City, Tennessee who most recently competed in the USL League Two in 2022.

== History ==
Founded in 2016, the team represented the Tri-Cities Area communities in Northeast Tennessee and Southwest Virginia.

As of the conclusion of the 2022 USL League Two season, the club failed to qualify for the USL League. Two playoffs for the 6 years they participated in the USL.

=== Hiatus (2022–present) ===
On December 12, 2022, the team shared a statement to their social media accounts that "it is in the organization's best interest that we take the next year off from fielding a team". The club cited financial difficulties and the need for further planning prior to restarting. The same statement indicated that the club hoped to be active in time for the 2024 USL League Two season.

On February 13, 2024, USL League Two announced the 128 teams participating in the 2024 season, confirming that Tri-Cities would not rejoin the league and would remain inactive for a second consecutive season.

Tri-Cities did not participate in the 2025 USL League Two season.

== Stadium ==
The Otters played their home matches at TVA Credit Union Ballpark.

== Final 2022 roster ==
As of December 1, 2023

Note: Flags indicate national team as defined under FIFA eligibility rules; some limited exceptions apply. Players may hold more than one non-FIFA nationality.

No.	Pos.	Nation	Player
00	GK	(Germany) GER	Jasper Rump
0	GK	(United States) USA	Joshua Garvilla
1	GK	(United States) USA	Shane Lanson
3	DF	(England) ENG	Ant Cox
4	DF	(United States) USA	Andy Elkins
5	DF	(United States) USA	Austin Yowell
6	DF	(England) ENG	Mike Peck
7	MF	(Democratic Republic of the Congo) COD	Erick Kilosho
8	MF	(Chile) CHI	Nicholas Cortes
9	FW	(Costa Rica) CRC	Esteban Leiva
10	FW	(England) ENG	Patrick O'Halloran
11	FW	(England) ENG	Mikey Saunders
11	MF	(Argentina) ARG	Agu Ortiz
12	FW	(United States) USA	Davis Eddleman
14	FW	(Japan) JPN	Shoki Yoshida
15	DF	(Germany) GER	Torge Witteborg
16	DF	(United States) USA	Will Stallworth

No.	Pos.	Nation	Player
17	FW	(Chile) CHI	Sebastian Borquez
18	MF	(England) ENG	Fletcher Dyson
19	FW	(Spain) ESP	Aritz Uriarte
20	FW	(Denmark) DEN	Soeren Nygaard
21	FW	(United States) USA	Daniel Garvilla
22	MF	(Israel) ISR	Tom Tzabari
23	MF	(United States) USA	Nate Dragisich
24	MF	(United States) USA	Edin Hernandez
26	FW	(England) ENG	David Panter
27	DF	(United States) USA	Ethan Bishop
28	FW	(England) ENG	Conal Gallagher
29	MF	(Mexico) MEX	Raul Varela
30	FW	(United States) USA	Davis McBee
31	DF	(Germany) GER	Jan Gruhn
33	DF	(United States) USA	Kelly Gieber
35	DF	(United States) USA	David Evans
99	FW	(Norway) NOR	Noah Kvifte

== Year-by-year ==
As of as of March 17, 2025.

Year	League	Regular season	Playoffs	Open Cup
2016	USL PDL	8th, South Atlantic	did not qualify	did not enter
2017	USL PDL	9th, South Atlantic	did not qualify	did not qualify
2018	USL PDL	5th, Deep South	did not qualify	did not qualify
2019	USL League Two	4th, South Atlantic	did not qualify	did not qualify
2020	USL League Two	Season cancelled due to COVID-19 pandemic		
2021	USL League Two	4th, South Atlantic	did not qualify	did not qualify
2022	USL League Two	4th, South Central	did not qualify	did not qualify
2023	Team Inactive			
2024	Team Inactive			
2025	Team Inactive			
