= OVF Alliance =

American soccer team

- Full name: Oregon Valley Futbol Alliance U23
- Founded: 2020
- Stadium: South Albany High School
- Head Coach: Logan Hoffman
- League: USL League Two
- 2022: 5th, Northwest Division; Playoffs: DNQ
- Website: https://www.ovfalliance.com/

OVF Alliance is a soccer club from Albany, Oregon competing in the Northwest Division of USL League Two. They began play in the 2021 USL League Two season.

The club was formed as a merger of TFA Willamette and Corvallis SC. TFA Willamette was originally set to join the league for the 2020 season, however, the season was canceled due to the COVID-19 pandemic.

== Year-by-year ==
| Year | Division | League | Regular season (W–L–T) | Playoffs | U.S. Open Cup |
TFA Willamette
| 2020 | 4 | USL2 | Season canceled due to COVID-19 pandemic | | |
OVF Alliance
| 2021 | 4 | USL2 | 3rd, Northwest (3–7–2) | did not qualify | Ineligible |
| 2022 | 4 | USL2 | 3rd, Northwest (3–7–2) | did not qualify | did not qualify |
