= Salt City SC =

- Full name: Salt City Soccer Club
- Founded: November 21, 2017; 7 years ago
- Stadium: Zions Bank Real Academy; Herriman, Utah
- Owner: Utah Youth Soccer Association
- President/CEO: Bryan Attridge (2020-Present)
- Head Coach: Eric Landon (2017-Present)
- League: USL League Two
- 2023: 4th, Mountain Division; Playoffs: DNQ
- Website: https://www.utahyouthsoccer.net/salt-city-sc
Home colours	Away colours

Salt City SC (formerly Ogden City SC) is an American soccer club competing in USL League Two. In 2017, then UYSA CEO Andrew R. Hiatt represented the ownership group that would bring a team back to Utah. The club is operated by Utah Youth Soccer Association, the first semi-pro team run by a statewide youth soccer organization.

== Year-by-year ==
Year	Division	League	Regular season	Playoffs	Open Cup
Ogden City SC
2018	4	USL PDL	5th, Mountain	did not qualify	did not enter
2019	4	USL League Two	2nd, Mountain	did not qualify	did not qualify
2020	4	USL League Two	Season cancelled due to COVID-19 pandemic		
2021	4	USL League Two	3rd, Mountain	did not qualify	did not qualify
Salt City SC
2022	4	USL League Two	4th, Mountain	did not qualify	did not qualify
2023	4	USL League Two	4th, Mountain	did not qualify	did not qualify

== Stadium ==
- Spence Eccles Ogden Community Sports Complex, Ogden, Utah (2018-2021)
- Zions Bank Real Academy, Herriman, Utah (2022–present)

Ogden City SC (2018-2021)
