= Boston Bolts (USL) =

- Full name: Boston Bolts
- Nickname: Bolts
- Founded: 1986; 40 years ago
- Stadium: Alumni Field; Newton, Massachusetts
- Capacity: 2,000
- CEO: Marco Koolman
- Head Coach: Greig Robertson
- League: USL League Two
- 2024: 4th Northeast Division; Playoffs: DNQ
- Website: bostonbolts.com
Home colors

Boston Bolts is an American soccer club based in Newton, Massachusetts. The club's men's team plays in USL League Two, using Alumni Field at Mount Ida College, with capacity of 2,000, as their home field.

In 2021, the Boston Bolts finished the season 2nd in the Northeast Division of USL2 and qualified for the playoffs.

== Club history ==
The Boston Bolts started with four girls teams in 1986. Now the oldest soccer club in Massachusetts, the Bolts attracted the finest coaches and players in the Boston area, and rapidly grew to a coed club of national recognition. In 1994, the girls U19 Bolts captured the USYSA National Championship title, becoming the first and only girls team from Massachusetts to win the prestigious national title. In 2005, the boys U15 Bolts became the first and only Massachusetts boys team to win the title. In its tenure, Bolts teams have earned a spot of national prominence winning more state, regional and national cup competitions, and also other national and international showcase tournaments such as Score at the Shore, the Disney Showcase, Dallas Cup and Surf Cup, than any other Massachusetts team.

== Players ==
=== Notable former players ===
This list of notable former players comprises players who went on to play professional soccer after playing for the team in the Premier Development League, USL2, or those who previously played professionally before joining the team.

- (United States) Josh Bauer
- (Morocco) Younes Boudadi
- (Grenada) Shalrie Joseph
- (United States) Justin Rennicks
- (United States) Miles Robinson
- (United States) Mac Steeves
- (United States) Harry Swartz
- (United States) Oliver White

== Year-by-year ==
Year	Level	League	Regular season	Playoffs	U.S. Open Cup
2016	4	USL PDL	4th, Northeast	did not qualify	did not enter
2017	4	USL PDL	4th, Northeast	did not qualify	did not qualify
2018	4	USL PDL	4th, Northeast	did not qualify	did not qualify
2019	4	USL League Two	4th, Northeast	did not qualify	did not qualify
2020	Season cancelled due to COVID-19 pandemic				
2021	4	USL League Two	2nd, Northeast	Conference Quarterfinals	did not qualify
2022	4	USL League Two	6th, Northeast	did not qualify	did not qualify
2023	4	USL League Two	5th, Northeast	did not qualify	did not qualify
2024	4	USL League Two	4th, Northeast	did not qualify	did not qualify
2025	4	USL League Two	7th, Northeast	did not qualify	did not qualify
2026	4	USL League Two	6th, Northeast	did not qualify	did not qualify
