= Black Rock FC =

American soccer team

Black Rock
- Full name: Black Rock Football Club
- Founded: 2013; 13 years ago
- League: USL League Two
- 2024: 9th, Northeast Division; Playoffs: DNQ
- Website: blackrockfc.org
Home colours

Black Rock FC is an American soccer club that plays in USL League Two. Currently based in Nashua, New Hampshire, the club also offers residential football/soccer academies in partnership with traditional collegiate preparatory schools in the Northeast Region of the United States.

== History ==
The club was established in 2013 to develop Berkshire County players and prep school athletes of all ages from grassroots programs through its U19 Academy team.

For its first two seasons in USL League Two, home matches were played at the Hotchkiss School fields in Lakeville, Connecticut. As of February 2020, its primary USL2 venue is AppleJack Stadium in Manchester, Vermont. Other facilities include Berkshire Community College in Pittsfield, Massachusetts, indoor fields at Premier Sports Complex in Winsted, Connecticut and The Fieldhouse in Canaan, New York.

== Year-by-year ==
Year	Division	League	Regular season	Playoffs	U.S. Open Cup
2018	4	USL PDL	1st, Northeast	Conference Semifinals	did not enter
2019	4	USL League Two	5th, Northeast	did not qualify	1st Round
2020	Season cancelled due to COVID-19 pandemic				
2021	4	USL League Two	4th, Northeast	did not qualify	did not qualify
2022	4	USL League Two	5th, Northeast	did not qualify	did not qualify
2023	4	USL League Two	8th, Northeast	did not qualify	did not qualify
2024	4	USL League Two	9th, Northeast	did not qualify	did not qualify
2025	4	USL League Two	3rd, Northeast	did not qualify	did not qualify
2026	4	USL League Two	4th, Northeast	did not qualify	did not qualify

== Notable former players ==
The following players have gone on to play professionally after playing for Black Rock FC.

- (England) Noah Abrams
- (Nigeria) Ifunanyachi Achara
- (Bermuda) Justin Donawa
- (United States) Nicky Downs
- (England) Jack Harrison
- (United States) Eduvie Ikoba
- (Bermuda) Zeiko Lewis
- (Zambia) Mutaya Mwape
- (Ghana) Umar Farouk Osman
- (Canada) Jacob Shaffelburg
