= Manhattan SC =

- Full name: Manhattan Soccer Club
- Founded: 1997; 29 years ago
- Stadium: Marillac Field; Riverdale, NY
- Capacity: 1,000
- Manager: Rich Corvino
- Coach: Ray Selvadurai
- League: USL League Two
- 2025: 4th, Metropolitan Division; Playoffs: DNQ
- Website: manhattansc.org
Home colours

The Manhattan Soccer Club is an American soccer club based in New York City. The club competes in the Metropolitan Division of USL League Two, the fourth tier of the American soccer pyramid.

== History ==
The Manhattan Soccer Club was formed in 1997 from a recreational soccer league on the Upper West Side of NYC. In the next five years, Manhattan SC grew quickly while staying involved in a few local leagues. The club began to grow in the mid-2000s, when it formed its first state and regional-level teams in NYC. The renovation of Randall's Island Park in the late 2000s provided Manhattan SC with a place to train and play. In 2025, Manhattan SC has a primary location in New York City and a satellite location in Westchester County, New York, with 115 travel teams and over 1,700 registered travel players aged eight through nineteen years old.

By 2009, Manhattan SC launched an annual tournament held in the first week of March. With the addition of a College Showcase a few years later, the club's name recognition and reputation rose.

By 2010, Manhattan SC fielded boys and girls teams in a variety of leagues and divisions, winning over 30 cup titles, 20 Premier League titles, and three National Championships as well as other individual tournament titles.

In December 2018, Manhattan SC entered a team in the semi-professional USL League Two, in the fourth tier of the U.S. soccer system. In March 2019, the club was accepted into the Boys ECNL. In December 2021, Manhattan SC entered the semi-professional USL Women's League, and in December 2023, the club was accepted into the Girls ECNL Regional League.

== Year-by-year ==
=== Men's team ===
| Year | Division | League | Reg. season | Playoffs | Open Cup |
|---|---|---|---|---|---|
| 2019 | 4 | USL League Two | 3rd, Northeast | did not qualify | did not enter |
| 2020 | 4 | USL League Two | Season cancelled due to COVID-19 pandemic | | |
| 2021 | 4 | USL League Two | 4th, Metropolitan | did not qualify | did not qualify |
| 2022 | 4 | USL League Two | 1st, Metropolitan | Conference Quarterfinals | did not qualify |
| 2023 | 4 | USL League Two | 3rd, Metropolitan | did not qualify | 2nd Round |
| 2024 | 4 | USL League Two | 4th, Metropolitan | did not qualify | did not qualify |
| 2025 | 4 | USL League Two | 7th, Metropolitan | did not qualify | did not qualify |
| 2026 | 4 | USL League Two | 6th, Metropolitan | did not qualify | did not qualify |

=== Women's team ===
| Year | Division | League | Reg. season | Playoffs |
|---|---|---|---|---|
| 2025 | 4 | USL W League | 8th, Metropolitan | did not qualify |
| 2026 | 4 | USL W League | 6th, Metropolitan | did not qualify |
