= Charlotte Independence Soccer Club =

American soccer team

Charlotte Independence II
- Full name: Charlotte Independence Soccer Club
- Founded: 2019; 7 years ago
- Stadium: Manchester Meadows Soccer Complex
- Owner(s): John Muzzi & Dwayne Sinclair
- Chairman: John Muzzi
- Head Coach: Dave Carton
- League: USL League Two
- 2024: 8th, South Atlantic Division; Playoffs: DNQ
- Website: independencesoccer.club
Home colors

Charlotte Independence Soccer Club, sometimes referred to as Charlotte Independence II, is a soccer club from Rock Hill, South Carolina that competes in the Deep South Division of USL League Two. They are the affiliate of USL League One club Charlotte Independence. Despite the similar name and using the same logo, they are a separately owned and operated club from the professional team, instead merely affiliated with them.

The club was formed following the merger of Discoveries SC, Carolina Rapids, and Lake Norman SC to form the Charlotte Independence Soccer Club which will serve as the affiliate club for the Charlotte Independence of the USL League One. They will take the league spot that Discoveries previously occupied. They were set to begin play in the 2020 USL League Two season, however, the season was canceled due to the COVID-19 pandemic.

== Year-by-year ==
| Year | Level | League | Reg. season | Playoffs | U.S. Open Cup |
|---|---|---|---|---|---|
| 2020 | 4 | USL League Two | Season canceled due to COVID-19 pandemic | | |
| 2021 | 4 | USL League Two | 7th, Deep South | did not qualify | did not qualify |
| 2022 | 4 | USL League Two | 4th, South Atlantic | did not qualify | did not qualify |
| 2023 | 4 | USL League Two | 8th, South Atlantic | did not qualify | did not qualify |
| 2024 | 4 | USL League Two | 8th, South Atlantic | did not qualify | did not qualify |
| 2025 | 4 | USL League Two | 2nd, South Atlantic | Eastern Conference Qualifying Round | did not qualify |
| 2026 | 4 | USL League Two | 1st, South Atlantic | Conference Quarterfinals | did not qualify |
