= Utah Red Wolves SC =

Park City Red Wolves SC
- Full name: Park City Red Wolves Soccer Club
- Founded: December 28, 2018; 7 years ago
- Dissolved: 2024
- Stadium: Judge Field; Salt Lake City, Utah
- Owners: Robert Martino
- Head Coach
- League: USL League Two
- 2023: 1st, Mountain Division; Playoffs: Conference Quarterfinals
- Website: www.utahredwolves.com
Home colours

Utah Red Wolves SC, formerly known as Park City Red Wolves SC, were an American soccer club in Salt Lake City, Utah competing in the USL League Two. They are an affiliate team of USL League One club Chattanooga Red Wolves The team moved to Salt Lake City beginning with the 2021 season, though they kept the Park City name. In 2023 they rebranded as the Utah Red Wolves.

== History ==
The club was founded in 2018 by the Chattanooga Red Wolves to serve as one of their affiliate clubs. The Dalton Red Wolves were formed at the same time, as another affiliate. Both affiliates would operate as U23 teams and play in the fourth tier USL League Two. In 2023, Scott Mackenzie was promoted to head coach of Chattanooga Red Wolves.

== Year-by-year ==
Year	Division	League	Reg. season	Playoffs	Open Cup
2019	4	USL League Two	3rd, Mountain	did not qualify	did not enter
2020	4	USL League Two	Season cancelled due to COVID-19 pandemic		
2021	4	USL League Two	1st, Mountain	Conference Final	did not qualify
2022	4	USL League Two	1st, Mountain	Conference Quarterfinals	1st Round
2023	4	USL League Two	1st, Mountain	Conference Quarterfinals	1st Round
Spring 2024	4	UPSL	7th, Mountain West	did not qualify	DNP
Fall 2024	4	UPSL	2nd, Mountain West	did not qualify	DNP
Spring 2025	4	UPSL	4th, Mountain West	did not qualify	DNP

== Honors ==
=== League ===
- USL League Two
  - Mountain Division
    - Champions: 2021, 2022, 2023
