= Sarasota Metropolis FC =

- Full name: Sarasota Metropolis Football Club
- Founded: January 23, 2019; 7 years ago
- Stadium: IMG Academy; Bradenton, Florida
- Capacity: 2,000
- President: Victor Young
- Head Coach: Bill Unzicker
- League: USL League Two
- 2019: 7th, Southeast Division; Playoffs: DNQ
- Website: https://www.sarasotametropolisfc.com/

Sarasota Metropolis FC is a soccer club competing in the USL League Two. 2019 was their debut season.

== Year-by-year ==
Year	Division	League	Reg. season	Playoffs	Open Cup
2019	4	USL League Two	7th, Southeast	did not qualify	did not enter
