= Daytona Rush SC =

Daytona Rush
- Full name: Daytona Rush Soccer Club
- Founded: January 21, 2019; 7 years ago
- Stadium: Daytona Stadium; Daytona Beach, Florida
- Capacity: 10,000
- League: USL League Two
- 2019: 3rd, Southeast Division; Playoff: DNQ
- Website: daytonarush.com

Daytona Rush Soccer Club was an American soccer club competing in the USL League Two. The team finished in third in the Southern Division in their only season with a 7-3-4 record. They were owned by Rush Soccer, who also backed three other USL2 sides - Cedar Stars Rush, Colorado Rush SC, Virginia Beach United.

== Year-by-year ==
Year	Division	League	Reg. season	Playoffs	Open Cup
2019	4	USL League Two	3rd, Southeast	Did not qualify	Did not enter
