= Matthew Vowinkel =

American soccer player (born 1999)

Personal information
- Full name: Matthew Vowinkel
- Date of birth: January 29, 1999 (age 27)
- Place of birth: New Hyde Park, New York, United States
- Height: 1.85 m (6 ft 1 in)
- Position: Forward

Youth career
- 2009–2012: New Hyde Park Wildcats
- 2012–2015: Albertson SC
- 2015–2017: Massapequa SC

College career
| Years | Team | Apps | (Gls) |
| 2017–2021 | Hofstra Pride | 89 | (42) |

Senior career*
| Years | Team | Apps | (Gls) |
| 2019 | Westchester Flames | 7 | (1) |
| 2022 | Long Island Rough Riders | 12 | (11) |
| 2022 | NY Greek American | | |
| 2023 | One Knoxville | 18 | (0) |
- * Club domestic league appearances and goals as of October 18, 2023

Matthew Vowinkel (born January 29, 1999) is an American professional soccer player who plays as a forward.

== Career ==
=== Youth ===
Vowinkel played four years of varsity soccer at Chaminade High School, helping the Flyers to back-to-back New York State championships. During that time at Chaminde, he was a two-time NSCAA All-American, CHSSA MVP, and championship game MVP, as well as New York State Gatorade Player of the Year in 2015; NSCHSAA New York State Player of the Year, Newsday Player of the Year, News12 Varsity Player of the Year in 2016; and a two-time all-state and NSCAA All-Region honoree. In total, Vowinkel played 85 high school games, tallying 86 goals and 28 assists. Vowinkel also played for three local sides over the span of nine years, New Hyde Park Wildcats, Albertson SC, and Massapequa SC where he helped the team win the ENYYSA State Cup in 2015 and 2016.

=== College and amateur ===
In 2017, Vowinkel attended Hofstra University to play college soccer. Over five seasons with the Pride, Vowinkel made 89 appearances, scoring 42 goals and tallying 16 assists. He was also voted to the Colonial Athletic Association All-Conference First Team three times over his college career, as well as First Team All-Atlantic Region in 2021.

While at college, Vowinkel also appeared in the USL League Two with the Westchester Flames during their 2019 season, scoring one goal in his seven appearances.

Following college, Vowinkel entered the 2021 MLS SuperDraft and was selected 56th overall by FC Cincinnati. However, he wasn't signed by Cincinnati. He instead played in the USL League Two with Long Island Rough Riders, where his 15 goals in 17 appearances across the regular season and playoffs helped the team to the National Final, where they lost 2–1 to Ventura County Fusion. He also spent time with Eastern Premier Soccer League side NY Greek American, who he'd trained with prior to college.

=== Professional ===
On December 19, 2022, it was announced that Vowinkel would join USL League One side One Knoxville SC ahead of their inaugural season as a professional club in 2023. He made his professional debut on April 12, 2023, appearing as a 73rd-minute substitute during a 1–1 draw with Central Valley Fuego.
