= Brave SC =

- Full name: Brave Sporting Club
- Nickname: Buffalo
- Short name: BSC
- Founded: 2008; 18 years ago
- Stadium: H.G. Morse Stadium at The Villages Charter School - Middleton Campus
- Capacity: 1,000
- Coach: Anderson DaSilva
- League: USL League Two
- 2026: 1st, National; Playoffs: TBD
- Website: bravesc.com
Home colors	Away colors

Brave SC or Brave Sporting Club, (formerly The Villages SC) is an American soccer club from Summerfield, Florida that plays in USL League Two. The team was founded in 2009 as The Villages SC and began playing in USL League 2 (Then PDL) in 2016.

== History ==
=== The Villages SC ===
Brave SC began as a youth team in 2008 under the name The Villages SC, serving The Villages, Florida and the surrounding areas. In 2016, the club acquired the USL League 2 (formerly Premier Development League, PDL) operating license from Ocala Stampede and began operations of its pre-professional first team, initially branding themselves as The Villages SC Buffalo. That year, the team recorded its first-ever win in the U.S. Open Cup against Kraze United, 1–0, and later defeated USL professional side Charleston Battery in a second-round penalty shootout, though the result was forfeited due to an ineligible player. In their inaugural PDL season, the club won the Southeast Division title and advanced to the South Conference semifinals, losing 2–1 to Midland/Odessa Sockers.

In 2017, The Villages SC returned to the US Open Cup but lost 2–1 to Jacksonville Armada U-23 and failed to qualify for the PDL playoffs. The 2018 season marked the club’s most successful campaign to that point, winning the South Conference Championship by defeating Tormenta 2 and SIMA Aguilas, before losing 1–0 to Reading United in the national semifinals. In 2019, the club qualified for the US Open Cup for a third time, defeating Lakeland Tropics on penalties before losing 4–1 to Tampa Bay Rowdies in the second round. That season also saw The Villages SC secure a second Southeast Division title and reach the South Conference semifinals, losing 3–1 to Tormenta FC 2. The 2020 season was cancelled due to the COVID-19 pandemic.

The Villages SC returned in 2021, winning the Southeast Division title and reaching the South Conference semifinals, where they lost 4–2 to Tormenta 2. In 2022, they again qualified for the US Open Cup, defeating Orlando Wolves 6–0 in the first round before losing 6–0 to Tampa Bay Rowdies. The team finished second in the Southeast Division and hosted a South Conference playoff pod, losing to Carolina Dynamo on penalties in the quarterfinals. In 2023, The Villages SC won the Southeast Division and qualified for the playoffs, beating South Carolina Bantoms, Asheville SC, and Little Rock Rangers to claim the second South Conference Championship in club history, and earning a place in the USL 2 national semifinals, which they lost in a penalty shootout to Lionsbridge FC.

=== Brave Sporting Club ===
In late 2023, the team underwent rebranding in an effort to separate themselves from The Villages, Florida. They rebranded to Brave SC, a name which the ownership group chose due to the team’s brave style of playing. The colors shifted from green and tan to yellow and brown, with the crest being revamped to accommodate the new colors and name. As requested by the fans, the team did not move away from its Buffalo mascot, keeping the design in the new logo. They debuted this identity for the first time in their U.S. Open Cup opener against Savannah Clovers, losing 2-0.

In 2024, their first year as Brave SC, they won the USL League 2 southeast division for a record 5th time. They played fellow Floridian club Sarasota Paradise in the first round of the southern conference playoffs, winning 2-1. They would then face Asheville City SC in a rematch from the previous year, with Asheville winning 2-1. The team did not qualify for the 2025 U.S. Open Cup.

In 2025, the team experienced a slow start to their USL League Two season, failing to win in their first 4 games before finally winning 1-0 against Nona FC. They would end the season in 3rd place, failing to qualify for the playoffs. While they only scored 8 goals in their first 8 matches, they scored a USL League 2 record 24 goals in their final 4 matches. This record remains to this day as the most goals scored by a USL League 2 team in a 4 match span.

In 2026, the team announced it would relocate to Middleton, Florida and would play its home matches at the H.G. Morse Stadium at The Villages High School. They played their first 4 matches away before finally being able to open their new stadium with a 0-0 result vs Sporting Jacksonville.

The team remains the most successful USL League Two team in the state of Florida, with a record 5 southeastern division titles and 2 southern conference titles. They are the only Floridian team to ever play in the USL League Two national semifinals twice.

== Year-by-year ==
Year	Division	League	Regular season	Playoffs	Open Cup
2016	4	USL PDL	1st, Southeast	Conference Semifinals	2nd Round
2017	4	USL PDL	4th, Southeast	Did not qualify	1st Round
2018	4	USL PDL	2nd, Southeast	National Semifinals	Play-In Round
2019	4	USL League Two	1st, Southeast	Conference Semifinals	2nd Round
2020	4	USL League Two	Season cancelled due to COVID-19 pandemic		
2021	4	USL League Two	1st, Southeast	Conference Semifinals	Cancelled
2022	4	USL League Two	2nd, Southeast	Conference Quarterfinals	Did not qualify
2023	4	USL League Two	1st, Southeast	National Semifinals	1st Round
2024	4	USL League Two	1st, Southeast	Southern Conference Semi-finals	Did not qualify
2025	4	USL League Two	3rd, Southeast	Did not qualify	Did not qualify
2026	4	USL League Two	1st, Southeast	Conference Semifinals	TBD

== Current squad ==
As of 27th July 2023

NOT CURRENT

Note: Flags indicate national team as defined under FIFA eligibility rules; some limited exceptions apply. Players may hold more than one non-FIFA nationality.

No.	Pos.	Nation	Player
1	GK	BRA	Mathias Tieppo
2	FW	USA	Chris Dilan
3	DF	GER	Niclas Wittur
5	MF	BRA	Pedro Santos
6	MF	BRA	Gustavo Veiga
7	FW	ENG	Nick Butler
8	MF	CAN	Marco Chang
9	FW	MEX	Oscar Resano
10	FW	BRA	Lucas Mauro
11	MF	BRA	Frederico Ferreira
12	GK	USA	Andrew Muller
13	MF	BRA	Leonardo Andrade
14	MF	ECU	Alvaro Carrera
15	FW	USA	Michael Florian

No.	Pos.	Nation	Player
17	MF	USA	Adrian Chan
18	MF	BRA	Matheus Ferreira
19	DF	GER	Nicolai Muench
20	MF	USA	Nazar Deputat
21	DF	BRA	Henrique Mendes
23	MF	USA	Austin Lukasik
26	MF	USA	Aiden Kaczmarski
27	FW	BRA	Felipe Arruda
28	MF	BRA	Joao Ribeiro
29	DF	USA	Jaceson Globig
30	DF	BRA	Yago Lopes
32	DF	COL	Jonathan Avila Martinez

== Rivalries ==
NONA FC (Rodeo Derby)

In 2022, Orlando Based youth club Nona Football Academy joined the USL League 2 southeast division with a team named Nona FC Longhorns. The two sides quickly gained a reputation for intense games, though Brave SC has been the more successful team in the rivalry. Their current record as of 2026 against Nona FC is 4-3-3. The two sides have never met in the postseason.

Asheville City SC (Southern Conference Showdown)

This rivalry mainly existed in the 2023 and 2024 USL League 2 seasons, with the two sides meeting once in the playoffs in each of those years, both times in Asheville. Asheville did twice play in Brave SC’s home stadium in the 2022 USL League Two playoffs, where Brave SC hosted one of the first round pods, though the two teams did not meet that season. In 2023, the two sides met in the southern conference semifinals, with Brave SC winning 1-0. In 2024, the two teams would meet on the same stage again, though the game was very controversial and ended with Asheville SC winning 2-1. During the game, several Brave SC players were targeted with racism, homophobia, and harassment from the Asheville SC fans, though Asheville City FC themselves stated they deeply regret the actions of its fans during the game.

South Georgia Tormenta II

This rivalry existed in the 2019 and 2021 USL League Two playoffs, with the two sides meeting in each of those years. In 2019, the Tormenta beat Brave SC 2-0 in the opening round of the playoffs. In 2021. The two sides met in the southern conference semifinals, in a game that involved many fights from both sides, mainly Tormenta. Brave SC players reported hearing racist slurs toward them, which led to red cards being issued to both sides. The Tormenta won 4-2 in AET. The South Georgia Tormenta team no longer exists.

== SC Niterói ==
In 2023, the club announced a partnership with Niterói, Rio de Janeiro, Brazil based youth club Brave SC Niterói. The club rosters 80 futsal players and is competing in its first outdoor soccer season. The partnership allows for coaching materials and tactics as well as players to be shared between the two sides.

== Honors ==
- USL League 2 Southern Conference
  - Champions: 2018, 2023
- USL League 2 Southeast Division
  - Champions: 2016, 2019, 2021, 2023, 2024
