= Discoveries SC =

American soccer team

- Full name: Discoveries Soccer Club
- Dissolved: 2019
- Stadium: Manchester Meadows Soccer Complex
- Head Coach: Dave Carton
- League: USL League Two
- 2019: 5th, Deep South
- Website: https://www.oasyssports.com/DiscoveriesSC/content.cfm?section=5B133C04-B662-4055-A69B-99571D42FB23&content_id=249C075A-07AF-4969-A646-D48EEB551FB5

Discoveries Soccer Club was a soccer club from Rock Hill, South Carolina that competed in the Deep South Division of USL League Two.

They joined USL League Two for the 2019 USL League Two season. Their first match ended in a 0–0 draw with the Charlotte Eagles.

Following the season, the club merged with the Carolina Rapids and Lake Norman SC to form the Charlotte Independence Soccer Club which will serve as the affiliate club for the Charlotte Independence of the USL Championship.

== Year-by-year ==
Year	Level	League	Reg. season	Playoffs	Open Cup
2019	4	USL League Two	5th, Deep South	Did not qualify	Did not enter
