= Bobby Edwards (soccer) =

American soccer player

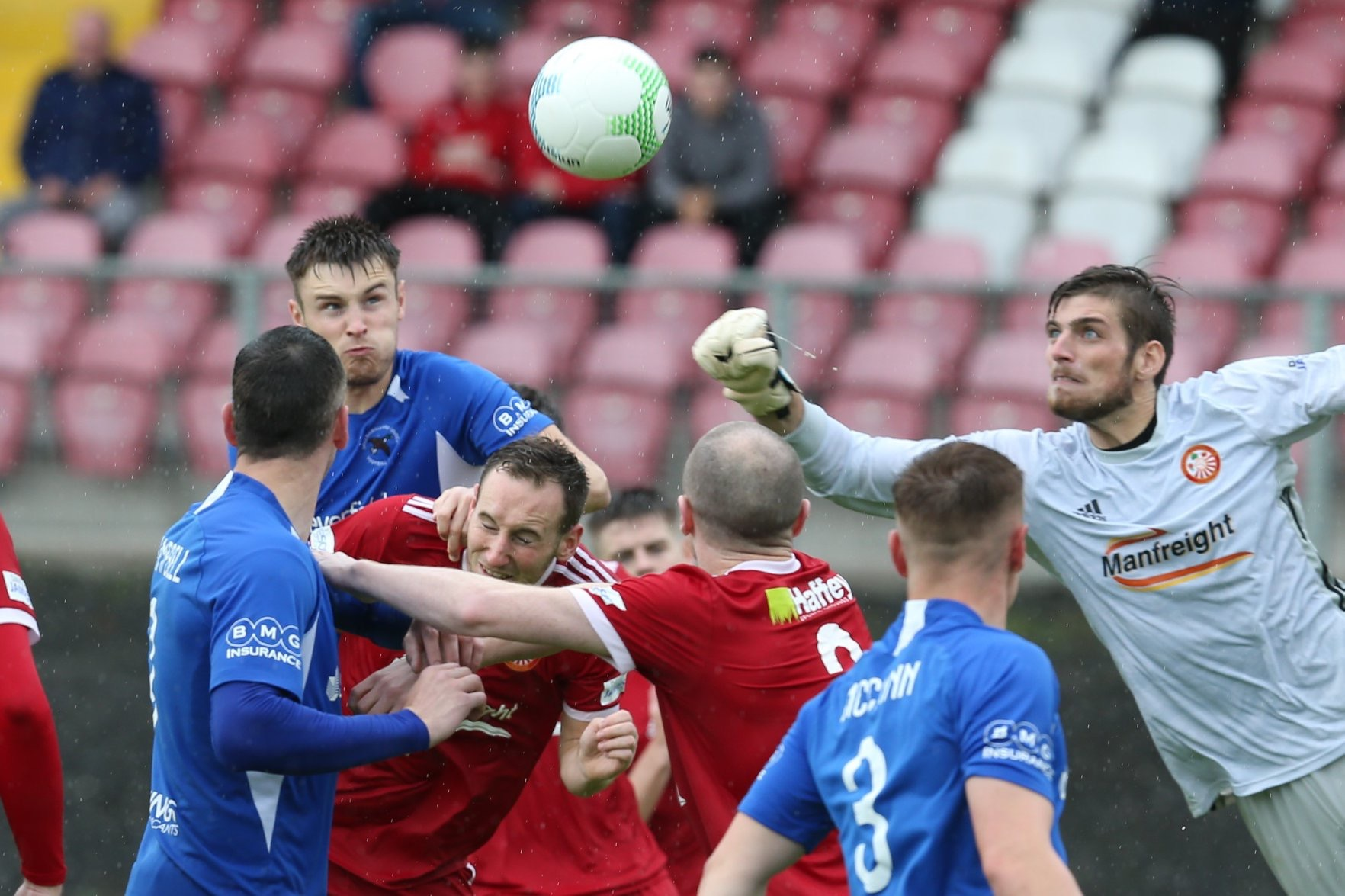

Personal information
- Date of birth: August 11, 1995 (age 31)
- Place of birth: Parsippany, New Jersey, United States
- Height: 1.98 m (6 ft 6 in)
- Position: Goalkeeper

College career
Years	Team	Apps	(Gls)
2014–2016	St. Joseph's Hawks	30	(0)
2017	Monmouth Hawks	16	(0)
2018	Mount St. Mary's Mountaineers	16	(0)

Senior career*
Years	Team	Apps	(Gls)
2016-2017	New York Red Bulls U-23	4	(0)
2018-2019	SC United Bantams	20	(0)
2019	Portadown	23	(0)
2020	FC Cincinnati	2	(0)
2021–2022	Indy Eleven	7	(0)
- * Club domestic league appearances and goals as of November 5, 2021

Bobby Edwards (born August 11, 1995) is a retired former American soccer goalkeeper.

Raised in Parsippany-Troy Hills, New Jersey, Edwards played prep soccer at St. Benedict's Preparatory School.

== Career ==
=== College ===
Edwards began his college career at Saint Joseph's University, and subsequently spent time at Monmouth University and Mount St. Mary's University. He made a total of 62 appearances in his college career. Edwards played in the Player Development Summer League with the New York Red Bulls U-23 in 2016 and 2017 and with the SC United Bantams in 2018 and 2019. Edwards was named to the Team of the Year for the USL2 2019 season.

=== Professional ===
In June 2019, Edwards signed his first professional contract with Portadown F.C. of the NIFL Premiership, where he would make 23 appearances at goalkeeper leading the team to a first-place finish. Edwards was pivotal to The Ports’ title run, registering a 16W-3L-4D record and finishing with a sparkling 0.78 goals against average and 12 shutouts.While playing for Portadown FC Edwards went on trials with the Blackburn Rovers in the English Football Championship League as well as with Burnley FC in the English Premier League.

Edwards signed with Major League Soccer side FC Cincinnati on January 20, 2020, playing two games in goal, including the team's first victory over arch rival Columbus Crew since their entrance to the MLS. . He was released by Cincinnati at the end of their 2020 season.

On February 12, 2021, Edwards signed with USL Championship side Indy Eleven. Following the 2021 season, Edwards re-signed with Indy ahead of the 2022 season.

On February 11, 2022, Edwards announced his retirement from playing professional soccer, citing personal reasons for his decision. Edwards took up a new role as Indy Eleven's assistant goalkeeper coach and Director of Goalkeeping for Indiana Fire Juniors' MLS NEXT Academy. On July 11, 2023, FC Cincinnati announced the return of Edwards as new addition to the academy's goalkeeper coaching staff.

== Personal ==
Through his friendship with the Cordrey Family of Cincinnati, Edwards has been an outspoken advocate of *Brain Aneurysm Awareness", "NRC Foundation" and "Donate Life" as a way of honoring the legacy of the life of young Nick Cordrey.
