= Colorado Pride Switchbacks U23 =

American soccer team

- Founded: January 26, 2018; 8 years ago
- Ground: Weidner Field; Colorado Springs, Colorado
- Capacity: 5,000
- Owner(s): Colorado Springs Switchbacks FC; Pride Soccer Club
- Head Coach: Diego Zaltron (Argentina)
- League: USL League Two
- 2019: 1st, Mountain Division; Playoffs: Conference Semifinals
- Website: https://www.pridetopro.com/
Home colors	Away colors

Colorado Pride Switchbacks U23 is an American soccer club competing in USL League Two. It is a U-23 / developmental team operated jointly by Colorado Springs Switchbacks FC of the USL Championship and Pride Soccer Club academy, founded in 1994.

== Year-by-year ==
Year	Division	League	Regular season	Playoffs	Open Cup
2018	4	USL PDL	4th, Mountain	Did not qualify	Did not enter
2019	4	USL PDL	1st, Mountain	Conference Semifinals	2020 qualified

== Honors ==
- USL League Two Mountain Division Champions 2019

== Stadia ==
- Washburn Field, Colorado Springs, Colorado (2018)
- Weidner Field, Colorado Springs, Colorado (2018–present)
