= Lamine Conte =

Guinean footballer (born 1998)

Personal information
- Date of birth: 15 August 1998 (age 28)
- Place of birth: Conakry, Guinea
- Height: 5 ft 10 in (1.78 m)
- Position: Defender

Youth career
- 2014–2016: Philadelphia Union

College career
Years	Team	Apps	(Gls)
2016–2017	Mobile Rams	23	(0)
2018–2020	Louisville Cardinals	31	(0)

Senior career*
Years	Team	Apps	(Gls)
2017–2019	Reading United	28	(0)
2021–2022	New York Red Bulls II	21	(0)
- * Club domestic league appearances and goals as of 4 October 2022

Lamine Conte (born 15 August 1998) is a Guinean footballer.

== Career ==
=== Early career ===
Conte was born in Conakry, Guinea, before moving to the United States. He played with the Philadelphia Union academy between 2014 and 2016, helping the Union to the U.S. Soccer Development U16 Final Four during the 2014–15 season.

In 2016, Conte attended the University of Mobile to play college soccer. Here, he made 23 stats over two seasons with the Rams. Conte was named an NAIA Second Team All-American as a sophomore and helped the Rams advance to the quarterfinal of the 2017 NAIA National Championship. and was selected to the Southern States Athletic Conference All-Tournament Team, earned SSAC First Team All-Conference and NAIA All-National Team honors, as well as being named to the SSAC All-Freshman Team in 2016.

In 2018, Conte transferred to the University of Louisville, where he made 31 appearances, tallying a single assist and being named to the 2018 ACC Championship All-Tournament Team.

Whilst at college, Conte played three seasons with Reading United AC in the USL League Two, making 28 regular season appearances and nine playoff appearances. In 2019, he was voted League Two Defensive Player of the Year.

=== Professional ===
On 21 January 2021, Conte was selected 40th overall in the 2021 MLS SuperDraft by New York Red Bulls. Conte signed with USL Championship club New York Red Bulls II on 22 April 2021. Due to visa issues, Conte didn't play with the team during their 2021 season, but re-signed with the club for another season on 25 January 2022. He made his professional debut on 12 March 2022, starting against The Miami FC.
