= Martín Sánchez =

Martín Sánchez may refer to:

- Martín Sánchez (boxer) (1979–2005), Mexican featherweight boxer
- Martín Sánchez (footballer) (born 2000), Paraguayan footballer
