= Søren Jensen =

Søren Jensen may refer to:

- Søren Jensen (footballer) (born 1984), Danish footballer
- Søren Jensen (rower) (1919–1995), Danish rower
- Søren Jensen (sculptor) (born 1957), Danish sculptor
- Søren Alfred Jensen (1891–1978), Danish gymnast and Olympic medalist
- Søren Marinus Jensen (1879–1965), Danish wrestler and Olympic medalist
- Søren Jensen (handballer) (born 1942), Danish handball player and Olympic competitor
- Søren Elung Jensen (1928–2017), Danish film actor
- Søren Georg Jensen (1917–1982), Danish silversmith and sculptor
