= FC Florida U23 =

- Founded: January 28, 2016; 9 years ago
- Ground: Club Med Sandpiper Bay
- Head Coach: Thomas Durkin
- League: USL League Two
- 2022: 9th, Southeast Division; Playoffs: DNQ
- Website: www.tritonsusl.com
Home colors	Away colors

Logo as North County United

FC Florida U23, formerly known as Treasure Coast Tritons, North County United and South Florida Surf, is an American soccer club that plays in USL League Two.

In January 2016, it was announced that the club had been granted a franchise license for the Premier Development League.

== Year-by-year ==
Year	Division	League	Regular season	Playoffs	Open Cup
South Florida Surf
2016	4	USL PDL	2nd, Southeast	Conference Semifinals	did not qualify
2017	4	USL PDL	7th, Southeast	did not qualify	2nd Round
North County United
2018	4	USL PDL	8th, Southeast	did not qualify	did not qualify
Treasure Coast Tritons
2019	4	USL League Two	2nd, Southeast	did not qualify	did not qualify
2020	4	USL League Two	Season cancelled due to COVID-19 pandemic		
FC Florida U23
2021	4	USL League Two	6th, Southeast	did not qualify	did not qualify
2022	4	USL League Two	9th, Southeast	did not qualify	did not qualify
