= Virginia Beach United FC =

Virginia Beach United
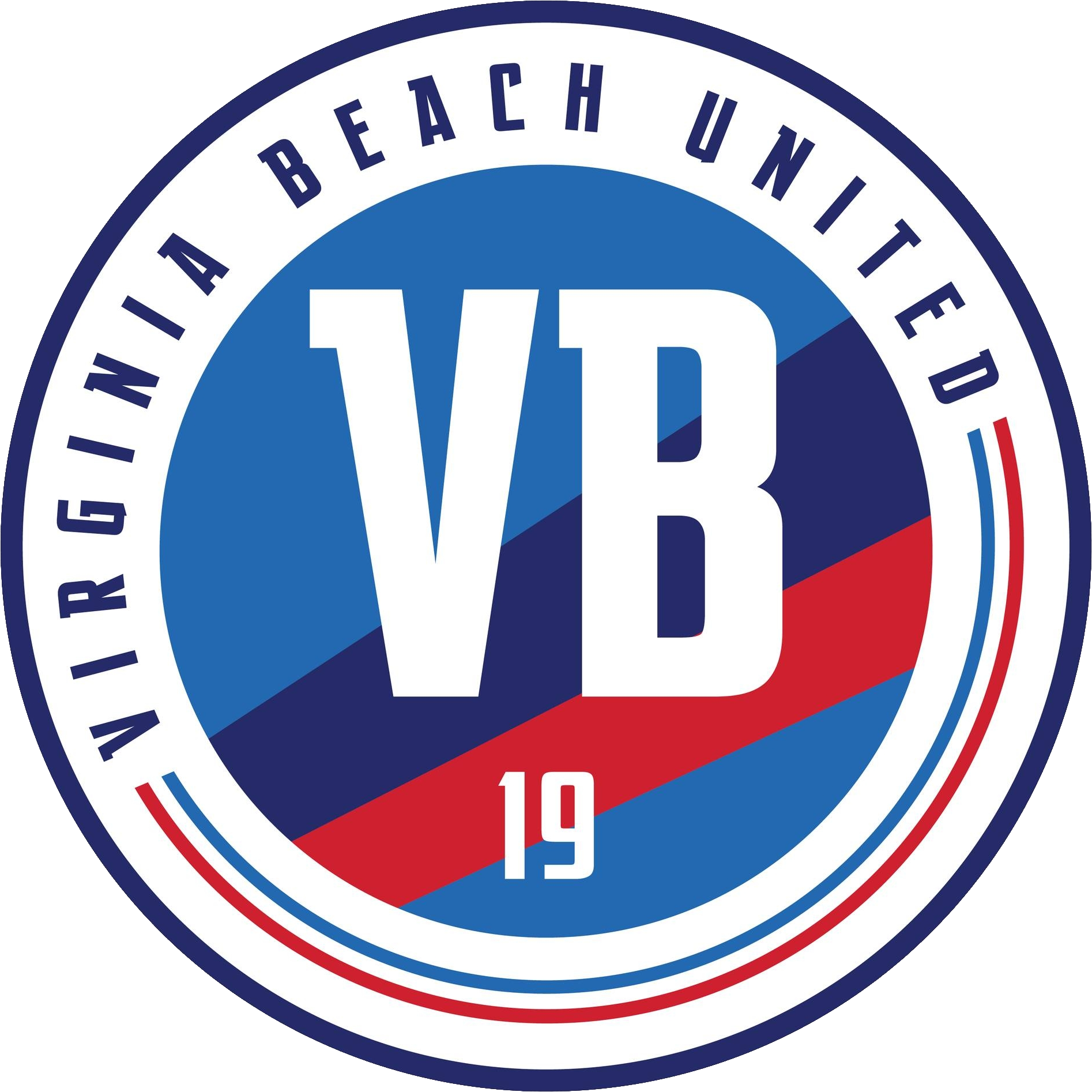
- Full name: Virginia Beach United Football Club
- Founded: January 1, 2019; 7 years ago
- Stadium: Virginia Beach Sportsplex
- Capacity: 6,000
- Head Coach: Chris Mills
- League: USL League Two
- 2024: 2nd, Chesapeake Division; Playoffs: Conference Quarterfinals
- Website: vbunited.com
Home colours	Away colours

Virginia Beach United Football Club are an American soccer club competing in the USL League Two, founded in 2019 and based in Virginia Beach, Virginia. The team is a joint effort of local youth organizations Beach FC and Virginia Rush.

They are owned by Rush Soccer, who also back three other USL2 sides –Cedar Stars Rush, Colorado Rush SC, and Daytona Rush SC.

== Year-by-year ==
=== Men's team ===
Year	Division	League	Reg. season	Playoffs	Open Cup
2019	4	USL League Two	3rd, South Atlantic	did not qualify	did not enter
2020	4	USL League Two	Season cancelled due to COVID-19 pandemic		
2021	4	USL League Two	8th, South Atlantic	did not qualify	did not enter
2022	4	USL League Two	4th, Chesapeake	did not qualify	did not qualify
2023	4	USL League Two	4th, Chesapeake	did not qualify	did not qualify
2024	4	USL League Two	2nd, Chesapeake	Conference Quarterfinals	did not qualify
2025	4	USL League Two	3rd, Chesapeake	did not qualify	did not qualify
2026	4	USL League Two	2nd, Chesapeake	Conference Qualifying Round	did not qualify

=== Women's team ===
Year	Division	League	Reg. season	Playoffs
2025	4	USL W League	2nd, Chesapeake	did not qualify
2026	4	USL W League	2nd, Chesapeake	did not qualify
