= Tobacco Road FC =

- Full name: Tobacco Road Football Club
- Founded: 2013; 13 years ago
- Stadium: Durham County Stadium
- Capacity: 8,500
- Owner(s): Seth Kaplan and Cedric Burke
- League: USL League Two
- 2024: 7th, South Atlantic Division; Playoffs: DNQ
- Website: tobaccoroadfc.com
Home colors

Tobacco Road Football Club is an American soccer team based in Durham, North Carolina. The team plays in USL League Two, the fourth tier of the American soccer pyramid.

== History ==
The club existed under various names as a highly successful amateur program for many years in the Triangle Adult Soccer League, including 2013 when the team took the North Carolina Amateur Championship. The club was re-branded as Tobacco Road FC under the leadership of Seth Kaplan and Cedric Burke in 2013. Tobacco Road FC played the 2016 season in the National Premier Soccer League, reaching the finals of the South Atlantic Conference Playoffs where they fell to the Atlanta Silverbacks (NPSL) in extra time. In November 2016 it was announced that Tobacco Road FC would play the 2017 season in the Premier Development League.

== Year-by-year ==
Year	Division	League	Regular season	Playoffs	Open Cup
2016	4	NPSL	4th, South Atlantic	Divisional Final	did not enter
2017	4	USL PDL	6th, South Atlantic	did not qualify	did not enter
2018	4	USL PDL	5th, South Atlantic	did not qualify	did not qualify
2019	4	USL League Two	6th, South Atlantic	did not qualify	did not qualify
2020	4	USL League Two	Season cancelled due to COVID-19 pandemic		
2021	4	USL League Two	7th, South Atlantic	did not qualify	did not qualify
2022	4	USL League Two	6th, South Atlantic	did not qualify	did not qualify
2023	4	USL League Two	6th, South Atlantic	did not qualify	did not qualify
2024	4	USL League Two	7th, South Atlantic	did not qualify	did not qualify
2025	4	USL League Two	5th, South Atlantic	did not qualify	did not qualify
2026	4	USL League Two	9th, South Atlantic	did not qualify	did not qualify

== Stadium ==
Tobacco Road FC plays its home matches at Durham County Stadium.
