= Rush Soccer =

International soccer organization

- Formation: 1997
- Founder: Tim Schulz
- Type: Youth Soccer Organization
- Headquarters: New York

Rush Soccer is an international soccer organization that was founded in Denver, Colorado and is headquartered in New York. Rush Soccer partners with over 10000 youth and professional clubs across the world.

== History ==
Rush Soccer was founded in April 1997 in Denver, Colorado, by former professional player Tim Schulz. The Colorado Rush, the first domestic Rush club, has won over 12 National Championships, and 1 World Youth Tournament since the inaugural season began in 1997. The first partnered club was Virginia Rush in 2002 in Virginia Beach, Virginia.

In 2009, Rush Soccer began to expand internationally after partnering with a small district in South Africa called Nkomazi. Since then, Rush has formed partnerships with clubs in Africa, South America, Central America Europe and Asia. Rush is represented in 48 states of the US and in over 30 countries.

In 2024, Justin Miller was appointed as the new CEO of Rush Soccer, and has expanded the company into the Asian market, as well as collaborating with SKN St. Pölten Rush, an all-women’s club in Austria, and NK Varazdin, a men’s 1st division team in Croatia.

== Notable players ==
- Christian Pulisic
- Lindsey Horan
- Cole Bassett
- Collen Warner
- Paolo DelPiccolo
- Kekuta Manneh
