= 2021 USL League Two Playoffs =

Tournament details
- Country: United States
- Dates: July 16 - July 31
- Teams: 26

Final positions
- Champions: Des Moines Menace

Tournament statistics
- Matches played: 25
- Goals scored: 78 (3.12 per match)

Awards
- Best player: Manel Busquets (DMM)

The 2021 USL League Two Playoffs was the post-season championship for the 2021 USL League Two season. It is the twenty-sixth edition of the Playoffs and the second under the USL League Two banner. The playoffs began on July 16 and ended with the USL League Two Final on July 31.

There were no playoffs the previous season due to the COVID-19 pandemic.

The Des Moines Menace won their third straight Regular Season Title (2018, 2019, 2021), with an average of 2.75 standings points per game.

The Menace defeated North Carolina Fusion U23 in the National Final 1–0 before a record crowd of 7,342.

== Qualifying Teams ==
=== Eastern Conference ===
Northeast Division

- Western Mass Pioneers - Division Winner
- Boston Bolts - Division Runner-up
- Seacoast United Phantoms - Conference Wild Card (Best 3rd place record between the Mid Atlantic and Northeast Divisions)

Mid Atlantic Division

- West Chester United SC - Division Winner
- Ocean City Nor'easters - Division Runner-up

Metropolitan Division

- Long Island Rough Riders - Division Winner
- Cedar Stars Rush - Division Runner-up
- New York Red Bulls U-23 - Division 3rd Place

=== Southern Conference ===
South Atlantic Division

- North Carolina Fusion U23 - Division Winner
- Lionsbridge FC - Division Runner-up
- West Virginia United - Division 3rd Place

Deep South Division

- SC United Bantams - Division Winner
- Tormenta FC 2 - Division Runner-up
- East Atlanta FC - Division 3rd Place

Southeast Division

- The Villages SC - Division Winner
- Tampa Bay United - Division Runner-up

=== Central Conference ===
Great Lakes Division

- Kalamazoo FC - Division Winner
- Flint City Bucks - Division Runner-up
- Kings Hammer FC - Division 3rd Place

Heartland Division

- Des Moines Menace - Division Winner
- Chicago FC United - Division Runner-up

Mid South Division

- Mississippi Brilla FC - Division Winner
- Corpus Christi FC - Division Runner-up
- Texas United - Division 3rd Place

=== Western Conference ===
Mountain Division

- Park City Red Wolves - Division Winner

Northwest Division

- Portland Timbers U23s - Division Winner

Southwest Division

- Teams did not participate in the 2021 season due to COVID-19 concerns.

== Bracket ==
Conference Quarterfinals | Conference Semifinals
S2 | The Villages SC | 2
S8 | East Atlanta FC | 1
S2 | The Villages SC | 2
S4 | Tormenta FC 2 (a.e.t.) | 4
S4 | Tormenta FC 2 | 2
S5 | Lionsbridge FC | 0
Southern Conference
S1 | SC United Bantams | 3
S7 | West Virginia United | 1
S1 | SC United Bantams | 1
S3 | North Carolina Fusion U23 (a.e.t.) | 2
S3 | North Carolina Fusion U23 | 5
S6 | Tampa Bay United | 0
E1 | West Chester United SC | 2
E8 | New York Red Bulls U-23 | 1
E1 | West Chester United SC | 1
E5 | Ocean City Nor'easters | 0
E4 | Boston Bolts | 0
E5 | Ocean City Nor'easters | 1
Eastern Conference
E2 | Western Mass Pioneers | 4
E6 | Cedar Stars Rush | 0
E2 | Western Mass Pioneers (p) | 0 (5)
E7 | Seacoast United Phantoms | 0 (4)
E3 | Long Island Rough Riders | 1
E7 | Seacoast United Phantoms (a.e.t.) | 2
C1 | Des Moines Menace | 5
C8 | Texas United | 0
C1 | Des Moines Menace | 1
C5 | Flint City Bucks | 0
C4 | Chicago FC United | 1
C5 | Flint City Bucks | 3
Central Conference
C2 | Kalamazoo FC | 3
C6 | Corpus Christi FC | 1
C2 | Kalamazoo FC (p) | 1 (4)
C3 | Mississippi Brilla FC | 1 (1)
C3 | Mississippi Brilla FC | 3
C7 | Kings Hammer FC | 1
Western Conference

Conference Finals
S4 | Tormenta FC 2 | 2
S3 | North Carolina Fusion U23 (a.e.t.) | 4
E1 | West Chester United SC | 0
E2 | Western Mass Pioneers | 1
C1 | Des Moines Menace | 2
C2 | Kalamazoo FC | 1
W1 | Portland Timbers U23s (p) | 3 (4)
W2 | Park City Red Wolves | 3 (2)

National Semifinals
S3 | North Carolina Fusion U23 | 3
E2 | Western Mass Pioneers | 1
C1 | Des Moines Menace | 2
W1 | Portland Timbers U23s | 0

National Final
S3 | North Carolina Fusion U23 | 0
C1 | Des Moines Menace | 1

== Conference Playoffs ==
=== Eastern Conference Championship ===
| July 16, 2021 Conference Quarterfinals | Long Island Rough Riders | 1–2 (a.e.t.) | Seacoast United Phantoms | Lusitano Stadium; Ludlow, Massachusetts |
| 4:30 PM EDT | Kang 25' | | 59' |

| July 16, 2021 Conference Quarterfinals | Western Mass Pioneers | 4–0 | Cedar Stars Rush | Lusitano Stadium; Ludlow, Massachusetts |
| 7:30 PM EDT | Regragui 22', 45'; Agyemang 49'; Lerech 58'; Gutierrez (yellow card); Koduah (yellow card); Viera (yellow card) | Report | Yeboah (red card) 20'; Watkins (yellow card); Leong (yellow card); Martinez (yellow card) |

| July 17, 2021 Conference Quarterfinals | West Chester United SC | 2–1 | New York Red Bulls U-23 | Evergreen Sportsplex; Leesburg, Virginia |
| 5:00 PM EDT | Cueceoglu 17'; Amspacher 35' | Report | 23' |

| July 17, 2021 Conference Quarterfinals | Boston Bolts | 0–1 | Ocean City Nor'easters | Evergreen Sportsplex; Leesburg, Virginia |
| 7:00 PM EDT | Hu (yellow card); Bagdon (yellow card) | Report | Quartey (yellow card); Watson (yellow card); Becher 76'; Stafford (yellow card) |

| July 17, 2021 Conference Semifinal | Western Mass Pioneers | 0–0 (a.e.t.) (5–4 p) | Seacoast United Phantoms | Lusitano Stadium; Ludlow, Massachusetts |
| 7:00 PM EDT | Gutierrez (yellow card); Oberrauch (yellow card); Emery (yellow card); Ucar (yellow card); Rose (yellow card); Arriagada (yellow card) | Report | Pierrot (yellow card); Laws (yellow card) |

| July 18, 2021 Conference Semifinal | West Chester United SC | 1–0 | Ocean City Nor'easters | Evergreen Sportsplex; Leesburg, Virginia |
| 7:00 PM EDT | Burkhardt 38' | Report |

| July 23, 2021 Conference Final | West Chester United SC | 0–1 | Western Mass Pioneers | Eagle Field at Erk Russell Park; Statesboro, Georgia |
| 5:30 PM EDT | | Report | Lerech |

=== Southern Conference Championship ===
| July 16, 2021 Conference Quarterfinals | SC United Bantams | 3–1 | West Virginia United | South Eastern Freight Lines Soccer Center; Columbia, South Carolina |
| 7:30 PM EDT | Henderson 20'; Shokalook 21'; Kirkwood 33'; Roberts (yellow card); Maule (yellow card); Sojberg (yellow card) | Report | Jennings 12'; Stearn (yellow card); Ogilvie (yellow card) |

| July 17, 2021 Conference Quarterfinals | North Carolina Fusion U23 | 5–0 | Tampa Bay United | South Eastern Freight Lines Soccer Center; Columbia, South Carolina |
| 4:00 PM EDT |

| July 17, 2021 Conference Quarterfinals | The Villages SC | 2–1 | East Atlanta FC | TowneBank Stadium; Newport News, Virginia |
| 5:00 PM EDT | Paiva 10' (yellow card); Vacas 90+5'; Murtha (yellow card) | Report | Oke 41'; Feeney (yellow card) |

| July 17, 2021 Conference Quarterfinals | Tormenta FC 2 | 2–0 | Lionsbridge FC | TowneBank Stadium; Newport News, Virginia |
| 7:30 PM EDT | Rodriguez 56'; Lawrence 90+1' | Report |

| July 18, 2021 Conference Semifinal | SC United Bantams | 1–2 (a.e.t.) | North Carolina Fusion U23 | South Eastern Freight Lines Soccer Center; Columbia, South Carolina |
| 7:00 PM EDT | Shokalook 18'; Wigfall (yellow card); Rohrhirsch (yellow card); Kirkwood (yellow card); Fokam (yellow card) | Report | Miguez 45'; Santos 96'; Clow (yellow card); Molina (yellow card); Bole (yellow card) |

| July 18, 2021 Conference Semifinal | The Villages SC | 2–4 (a.e.t.) | Tormenta FC 2 | TowneBank Stadium; Newport News, Virginia |
| 7:00 PM EDT | Deputat 21'; Paiva 34' | Report | Ledoux 5'; Jowers 10'; Barry 112'; Rodriguez 120+3' |

| July 23, 2021 Conference Final | North Carolina Fusion U23 | 4–2 (a.e.t.) | Tormenta FC 2 | Eagle Field at Erk Russell Park; Statesboro, Georgia |
| 8:00 PM EDT | Gomiero 9' (pen.); Santos 40'; 109'; Duval 113' | | Heckenberg 52'; Rodriguez 58' |

=== Central Conference Championship ===
| July 16, 2021 Conference Quarterfinals | Chicago FC United | 1–3 | Flint City Bucks | Valley Stadium; West Des Moines, Iowa |
| 4:00 PM CDT | Gutierrez 50' | | Cisse 38'; Borczak 75'; Sanchez 90+3' |

| July 16, 2021 Conference Quarterfinals | Kalamazoo FC | 3–1 | Corpus Christi FC | Clinton High School; Clinton, Mississippi |
| 5:00 PM CDT | Banuelos 38', 48'; Harmon 67'; Jackson (yellow card); Halloran (yellow card) | Report | Wagner 52'; Butler (yellow card); Cresto (yellow card); Kranick (yellow card) |

| July 16, 2021 Conference Quarterfinals | Des Moines Menace | 5–0 | Texas United | Valley Stadium; West Des Moines, Iowa |
| 7:00 PM CDT | Ayats 9', 38', 47'; Rude 15'; Skelton 20'; O'Dwyer (yellow card) | Report | Estrada (yellow card) |

| July 16, 2021 Conference Quarterfinals | Mississippi Brilla FC | 3–1 | Kings Hammer FC | Clinton High School; Clinton, Mississippi |
| 7:30 PM CDT | Astorga 5'; James 59' (yellow card); Emeriau 90'; Lozano (yellow card); Morris (yellow card) | Report | Jones 46' (yellow card); Robinson (yellow card) |

| July 18, 2021 Conference Semifinal | Des Moines Menace | 1–0 | Flint City Bucks | Valley Stadium; West Des Moines, Iowa |
| 7:00 PM CDT | Haugli 51'; Busquets (yellow card); Thomas (yellow card); Mensah (yellow card); Fernandes (yellow card) | Report | Murana (yellow card); Caliskan (yellow card) |

| July 18, 2021 Conference Semifinal | Mississippi Brilla FC | 1–1 (a.e.t.) (1–4 p) | Kalamazoo FC | Clinton High School; Clinton, Mississippi |
| 7:00 PM CDT | Lozano 90' (yellow card); Onyango (yellow card); Alzate (yellow card); DiLuzio (yellow card) | Report | Banuelos 56'; O'Riordan (yellow card) |

| July 23, 2021 Conference Final | Des Moines Menace | 2–1 | Kalamazoo FC | Valley Stadium; West Des Moines, Iowa |
| 7:30 PM CDT | Busquets 45+9'; Walkes 90+4' | Report | O'Riordan 23'; Harmon (red card) 61' |

=== Western Conference Championship ===
| July 23, 2021 Conference Final | Portland Timbers U23 | 3–3 (a.e.t.) (4–2 p) | Park City Red Wolves | Valley Stadium; West Des Moines, Iowa |
| 4:30 PM CDT | Afonso 4', 57'; Sosa 11' | Report | Jiba 2'; Wight 63', 88' |
| | Penalties |
| | Santos (penalty scored); Rapaport (penalty scored); Brog (penalty scored); Andreou (penalty scored) | | (penalty missed) Vargas; (penalty scored) Silva; (penalty scored) Johnson; (penalty missed) Pena |

== USL League Two Championship ==
=== Semifinals ===
| July 25, 2021 National Semifinal | North Carolina Fusion U23 | 3–1 | Western Mass Pioneers | Eagle Field at Erk Russell Park; Statesboro, Georgia |
| 8:00 PM EDT | Duval 52', 87'; Molina 63' | Report | Agyemang 27' |

| July 25, 2021 National Semifinal | Des Moines Menace | 2–0 | Portland Timbers U23 | Valley Stadium; West Des Moines, Iowa |
| 7:30 PM CDT | Horveno 55'; Kiner 85' (o.g.) | Report |

=== Final ===
| July 31, 2021 National Final | Des Moines Menace | 1–0 | North Carolina Fusion U23 | Valley Stadium; West Des Moines, Iowa |
| 7:30 PM CDT | Manel Busquets 55' | Report; Report | | Attendance: 7,342; Referee: Carl Armstrong |

Championship MVP: Manel Busquets (DMM)
