= 2021 USL League Two season =

USL League Two
- Season: 2021
- Dates: May 5 – July 18 (regular season)
- Champions: Des Moines Menace (2nd Title)
- Regular season title: Des Moines Menace (5th Title)
- 2022 Hank Steinbrecher Cup qualifiers: Des Moines Menace; Flint City Bucks
- 2022 U.S. Open Cup qualifiers: Chicago FC United; Des Moines Menace; North Carolina Fusion U23; Ocean City Nor'easters; Park City Red Wolves SC; Portland Timbers U23; South Carolina United; The Villages SC; West Chester United SC; Western Mass Pioneers
- Matches: 495
- Goals: 1,616 (3.26 per match)
- Best player: (Argentina) Nicolás Molina West Virginia United
- Top goalscorer: (Argentina) Nicolás Molina West Virginia United (16 Goals)
- Best goalkeeper: (United States) Dane Jacomen West Chester United SC
- Longest winning run: 9 matches Des Moines Menace (May 15 – June 24)
- Longest unbeaten run: 12 matches Western Mass Pioneers (May 15 – July 9)
- Longest winless run: 14 matches (entire regular season); Dayton Dutch Lions; Westchester Flames
- Longest losing run: 11 matches FC Wichita (May 22 – July 10)
- All statistics correct as of July 31, 2021.

The 2021 USL League Two season is the 26th season of the USL League Two, the top pre-professional soccer league in the United States, since its establishment in 1995. The 2020 season, initially planned to be the 26th season of League Two, was cancelled due to the COVID-19 pandemic.

The regular season started on May 5 and concluded on July 18. 75 teams participated in this season. The Southwest Division teams elected not to play due to COVID-19 concerns.

== Team changes ==
=== New teams ===
- FC Málaga City (LaGrangeville, NY)
- FC Motown (Morristown, NJ)
- FC Wichita
- Fort Wayne FC
- Kalamazoo FC
- Kings Hammer FC (Covington, KY)
- Little Rock Rangers
- Morris Elite SC (Madison, NJ)
- New Jersey Copa FC (Metuchen, NJ)
- PDX FC (Portland, OR)
- Real Central New Jersey (Mercer County, NJ)
- Project 51O (Oakland, CA)
- Round Rock SC (Round Rock. TX)
- St. Louis Scott Gallagher SC (Fenton, MO)
- Tampa Bay United
- Toledo Villa FC

=== Departing teams ===
- Cincinnati Dutch Lions
- Daytona Rush SC
- GPS Portland Phoenix
- Louisville City FC U23
- New Mexico United U23
- Sarasota Metropolis FC
- Sound FC
- Tampa Bay Rowdies U23

=== Name changes ===
- Evergreen FC to Northern Virginia FC
- TFA Willamette to OVF Alliance
- Treasure Coast Tritons to FC Florida U23
- West Virginia Alliance FC to West Virginia United

== Teams ==
Note: Teams ~~lined out~~ are on hiatus due to the COVID-19 pandemic.

Central Conference
Division	Team
Great Lakes Division	~~AFC Ann Arbor~~
Great Lakes Division	Dayton Dutch Lions
Great Lakes Division	Flint City Bucks
Great Lakes Division	Fort Wayne FC
Great Lakes Division	Grand Rapids FC
Great Lakes Division	Kalamazoo FC
Great Lakes Division	Kings Hammer FC
Great Lakes Division	Oakland County FC
Great Lakes Division	South Bend Lions
Great Lakes Division	Toledo Villa FC
Heartland Division	Chicago FC United
Heartland Division	Des Moines Menace
Heartland Division	~~FC Manitoba~~
Heartland Division	FC Wichita
Heartland Division	Green Bay Voyageurs
Heartland Division	Kaw Valley FC
Heartland Division	~~Peoria City~~
Heartland Division	~~St. Louis Lions~~
Heartland Division	St. Louis Scott Gallagher
Heartland Division	~~Thunder Bay Chill~~
Mid South Division	AHFC Royals
Mid South Division	Brazos Valley Cavalry
Mid South Division	Corpus Christi FC
Mid South Division	Houston FC
Mid South Division	Little Rock Rangers
Mid South Division	Mississippi Brilla
Mid South Division	Round Rock SC
Mid South Division	Texas United

Eastern Conference
Division	Team
Northeast Division	AC Connecticut
Northeast Division	Black Rock FC
Northeast Division	Boston Bolts
Northeast Division	FC Malaga City
Northeast Division	Seacoast United Phantoms
Northeast Division	Western Mass Pioneers
Mid Atlantic Division	~~FC Bascome Bermuda~~
Mid Atlantic Division	Lehigh Valley United
Mid Atlantic Division	Northern Virginia FC
Mid Atlantic Division	Ocean City Nor'easters
Mid Atlantic Division	Philadelphia Lone Star
Mid Atlantic Division	Reading United AC
Mid Atlantic Division	Real Central New Jersey
Mid Atlantic Division	West Chester United
Metropolitan Division	Cedar Stars Rush
Metropolitan Division	F.A. Euro
Metropolitan Division	FC Motown
Metropolitan Division	Long Island Rough Riders
Metropolitan Division	Manhattan SC
Metropolitan Division	Morris Elite SC
Metropolitan Division	New Jersey Copa
Metropolitan Division	New York Red Bulls U-23
Metropolitan Division	Westchester Flames

Southern Conference
Division	Team
Deep South Division	Asheville City SC
Deep South Division	Charlotte Eagles
Deep South Division	Charlotte Independence 2
Deep South Division	Dalton Red Wolves
Deep South Division	East Atlanta FC
Deep South Division	Peachtree City MOBA
Deep South Division	SC United Bantams
Deep South Division	Tormenta FC 2
Deep South Division	Southern Soccer Academy
Southeast Division	FC Florida U23
Southeast Division	FC Miami City
Southeast Division	Florida Elite SA
Southeast Division	Tampa Bay United
Southeast Division	The Villages SC
Southeast Division	Weston FC
South Atlantic Division	Lionsbridge FC
South Atlantic Division	North Carolina FC U23
South Atlantic Division	North Carolina Fusion U23
South Atlantic Division	Tobacco Road FC
South Atlantic Division	Tri-Cities Otters
South Atlantic Division	Virginia Beach United
South Atlantic Division	Wake FC
South Atlantic Division	West Virginia United

Western Conference
Division	Team
Mountain Division	Colorado Rush SC
Mountain Division	Ogden City SC
Mountain Division	Park City Red Wolves
Northwest Division	~~Calgary Foothills~~
Northwest Division	Lane United
Northwest Division	OVF Alliance
Northwest Division	PDX FC
Northwest Division	Portland Timbers U23
Northwest Division	~~Eastside FC~~
Northwest Division	~~Vancouver TSS Rovers~~
Southwest Division	~~Golden State Force~~
Southwest Division	~~Project 51O~~
Southwest Division	~~San Francisco City~~
Southwest Division	~~San Francisco Glens~~
Southwest Division	~~Santa Cruz Breakers~~
Southwest Division	~~Southern California Seahorses~~
Southwest Division	~~Ventura County Fusion~~

== Standings ==
=== Eastern Conference ===
==== Northeast Division ====
Pos	Team	Pld	W	D	L	GF	GA	GD	Pts	PPG	Qualification
1	Western Mass Pioneers	14	10	2	2	34	12	+22	32	2.29	Advance to USL League Two Playoffs
2	Boston Bolts	14	10	0	4	29	16	+13	30	2.14	Advance to USL League Two Playoffs
3	Seacoast United Phantoms	14	9	2	3	33	19	+14	29	2.07	Advance to USL League Two Playoffs
4	Black Rock FC	14	4	3	7	18	28	−10	15	1.07	
5	FC Málaga City	14	1	5	8	7	24	−17	8	0.57	
6	AC Connecticut	14	1	2	11	13	35	−22	5	0.36	

Source: USL

==== Mid Atlantic Division ====
Pos	Team	Pld	W	D	L	GF	GA	GD	Pts	PPG	Qualification
1	West Chester United SC	14	11	2	1	29	6	+23	35	2.50	Advance to USL League Two Playoffs
2	Ocean City Nor'easters	14	9	3	2	40	12	+28	30	2.14	Advance to USL League Two Playoffs
3	Northern Virginia FC	14	8	2	4	27	21	+6	26	1.86	
4	Philadelphia Lone Star FC	14	5	0	9	22	28	−6	15 (Note: Philadelphia Lone Star FC wins the tiebreaker over Reading United AC on goal differential.)	1.07	
5	Reading United AC	14	4	3	7	18	27	−9	15	1.07	
6	Lehigh Valley United	14	3	1	10	18	39	−21	10	0.71	
7	Real Central New Jersey	14	2	3	9	10	31	−21	9	0.64	

Source: USL

==== Metropolitan Division ====
Pos	Team	Pld	W	D	L	GF	GA	GD	Pts	PPG	Qualification
1	Long Island Rough Riders	14	9	4	1	21	7	+14	31	2.21	Advance to USL League Two Playoffs
2	Cedar Stars Rush	14	8	3	3	28	15	+13	27	1.93	Advance to USL League Two Playoffs
3	New York Red Bulls U-23	14	7	4	3	23	10	+13	25	1.79	Advance to USL League Two Playoffs
4	Manhattan SC	14	7	3	4	28	15	+13	24	1.71	
5	FC Motown	14	6	2	6	18	15	+3	20	1.43	
6	New Jersey Copa FC	14	5	3	6	15	18	−3	18	1.29	
7	F.A. Euro	14	4	5	5	19	21	−2	17	1.21	
8	Morris Elite SC	14	3	2	9	8	28	−20	11	0.79	
9	Westchester Flames	14	0	2	12	13	44	−31	2	0.14	

Source: USL

=== Central Conference ===
==== Great Lakes Division ====
Pos	Team	Pld	W	D	L	GF	GA	GD	Pts	PPG	Qualification
1	Kalamazoo FC	14	9	4	1	29	14	+15	31	2.21	Advance to USL League Two Playoffs
2	Flint City Bucks	14	9	2	3	35	10	+25	29	2.07	Advance to USL League Two Playoffs
3	Kings Hammer FC	14	8	4	2	25	17	+8	28	2.00	Advance to USL League Two Playoffs
4	Grand Rapids FC	14	7	5	2	35	17	+18	26	1.86	
5	South Bend Lions	14	5	4	5	27	17	+10	19	1.36	
6	Oakland County FC	14	5	3	6	28	32	−4	18	1.29	
7	Toledo Villa FC	14	3	4	7	22	40	−18	13	0.93	
8	Fort Wayne FC	14	1	5	8	14	32	−18	8	0.57	
9	Dayton Dutch Lions	14	0	1	13	14	50	−36	1	0.07	

Source: USL

==== Heartland Division ====
Pos	Team	Pld	W	D	L	GF	GA	GD	Pts	PPG	Qualification
1	Des Moines Menace (R, C)	12	11	0	1	32	7	+25	33	2.75	Advance to USL League Two Playoffs
2	Chicago FC United	12	9	2	1	31	9	+22	29	2.42	Advance to USL League Two Playoffs
3	St. Louis Scott Gallagher	12	6	2	4	24	20	+4	20	1.67	
4	Kaw Valley FC	12	4	0	8	18	31	−13	12	1.00	
5	Green Bay Voyageurs	11	2	2	7	10	23	−13	8	0.73	
6	FC Wichita	11	0	0	11	5	30	−25	0	0.00	

Source: USL
(C) Champions; (R) Regular Season Champions

==== Mid South Division ====
Pos	Team	Pld	W	D	L	GF	GA	GD	Pts	PPG	Qualification
1	Mississippi Brilla	13	8	3	2	26	11	+15	27	2.08	Advance to USL League Two Playoffs
2	Corpus Christi FC	13	7	2	4	20	15	+5	23	1.77	Advance to USL League Two Playoffs
3	Texas United	14	6	3	5	20	19	+1	21	1.50	Advance to USL League Two Playoffs
4	AHFC Royals	14	5	5	4	25	24	+1	20	1.43	
5	Little Rock Rangers	14	6	1	7	17	17	0	19	1.36	
6	Houston FC	14	5	1	8	16	27	−11	16	1.14	
7	Round Rock SC	14	4	3	7	15	21	−6	15	1.07	
8	Brazos Valley Cavalry F.C.	14	3	4	7	22	27	−5	13	0.93	

Source: USL

=== Southern Conference ===
==== South Atlantic Division ====
Pos	Team	Pld	W	D	L	GF	GA	GD	Pts	PPG	Qualification
1	North Carolina Fusion U23	14	11	1	2	48	13	+35	34	2.43	Advance to USL League Two Playoffs
2	Lionsbridge FC	14	9	2	3	38	16	+22	29 (Note: Lionsbridge FC wins the tiebreaker over West Virginia United on goal differential.)	2.07	Advance to USL League Two Playoffs
3	West Virginia United	14	9	2	3	31	20	+11	29	2.07	Advance to USL League Two Playoffs
4	Tri-Cities Otters	14	7	3	4	28	16	+12	24	1.71	
5	Wake FC	14	4	3	7	21	33	−12	15	1.07	
6	North Carolina FC U23	14	3	1	10	15	38	−23	10	0.71	
7	Tobacco Road FC	14	3	1	10	12	44	−32	10	0.71	
8	Virginia Beach United FC	14	2	3	9	12	25	−13	9	0.64	

Source: USL

==== Deep South Division ====
Pos	Team	Pld	W	D	L	GF	GA	GD	Pts	PPG	Qualification
1	SC United Bantams	14	11	2	1	32	15	+17	35	2.50	Advance to USL League Two Playoffs
2	Tormenta FC 2	14	10	1	3	33	12	+21	31	2.21	Advance to USL League Two Playoffs
3	East Atlanta FC	14	6	3	5	18	24	−6	21	1.50	Advance to USL League Two Playoffs
4	Asheville City SC	14	6	2	6	16	20	−4	20	1.43	
5	Peachtree City MOBA	14	5	2	7	22	25	−3	17 (Note: Peachtree City MOBA wins the tiebreaker over Charlotte Eagles on total goals scored.)	1.21	
6	Charlotte Eagles	14	5	2	7	21	25	−4	17	1.21	
7	Charlotte Independence 2	14	4	4	6	20	22	−2	16	1.14	
8	Dalton Red Wolves	14	4	1	9	14	24	−10	13	0.93	
9	Southern Soccer Academy	14	3	1	10	13	22	−9	10	0.71	

Source: USL

==== Southeast Division ====
Pos	Team	Pld	W	D	L	GF	GA	GD	Pts	PPG	Qualification
1	The Villages SC	10	8	1	1	19	5	+14	25	2.50	Advance to USL League Two Playoffs
2	Tampa Bay United	10	5	3	2	19	12	+7	18	1.80	Advance to USL League Two Playoffs
3	Florida Elite SA	10	5	1	4	14	11	+3	16	1.60	
4	Weston FC	10	2	3	5	8	16	−8	9	0.90	
5	FC Miami City	10	2	2	6	16	23	−7	8 (Note: FC Miami City wins the tiebreaker over FC Florida U23 on goal differential.)	0.80	
6	FC Florida U23	10	2	2	6	8	17	−9	8	0.80	

Source: USL

=== Western Conference ===
==== Mountain Division ====
Pos	Team	Pld	W	D	L	GF	GA	GD	Pts	PPG	Qualification
1	Park City Red Wolves	10	5	2	3	24	20	+4	17	1.70	Advance to USL League Two Playoffs
2	Colorado Rush SC	10	4	2	4	18	17	+1	14	1.40	
3	Ogden City SC	10	3	2	5	18	23	−5	11	1.10	

Source: USL

==== Northwest Division ====
Pos	Team	Pld	W	D	L	GF	GA	GD	Pts	PPG	Qualification
1	Portland Timbers U23s	12	10	1	1	30	11	+19	31	2.58	Advance to USL League Two Playoffs
2	PDX FC	12	7	1	4	33	24	+9	22	1.83	
3	OVF Alliance	12	3	2	7	16	26	−10	11	0.92	
4	Lane United FC	12	1	2	9	18	36	−18	5	0.42	

Source: USL

=== Tie breakers ===
- 1) Head-to-head record based on total points in League games.
- 2) Points Per Game = Total points won / Total games played
- 3) Total wins in League games.
- 4) Goal difference in League games. If number of games is unequal, the Game Average will be used.
- 5) Goals scored in League games.
- 6) Total points within smallest group. If number of games is unequal, then point percentage will be used.
- 7) Ranking based on points earned against top four group finishers. This tiebreaker will not be used if four (4) or fewer teams comprise the group. If number of games is unequal, then point percentage applies.
- 8) Point percentage outside / smallest division or conference in League games.
- 9) Total points in all regular season and Open Cup qualifying games combined. If number of games is unequal, then point percentage applies.
- 10) FIFA Fair Play – Team with fewest disciplinary points in League games. (If number of games is unequal, points will be divided by games played to arrive at a common basis for comparison).
- 11) Lottery conducted by USL League Two.
1. League games refer solely to games that count towards the regular season standings. Open Cup specific games are not “League games” when it comes to determining placement in the League standings. (When using these criteria as tiebreakers for Open Cup groups, “League games” should be interpreted as only games that count toward Open Cup group standings).
2. Should more than two (2) teams involved have played an unequal number of total games this tie breaker will be skipped.
3. Game Average: Tie Breaker / number of games played (i.e. goals scored / number of games played).
4. Grouping: Term used to describe the primary unit in which a team competes (i.e. Southwest Division).
5. Point Percentage: Number of total points earned / maximum possible points (3 per game).

== Playoffs ==
=== Bracket ===
Conference Quarterfinals	Conference Semifinals
S2	The Villages SC	2
S8	East Atlanta FC	1
S2	The Villages SC	2
S4	Tormenta FC 2 (a.e.t.)	4
S4	Tormenta FC 2	2
S5	Lionsbridge FC	0
Southern Conference
S1	SC United Bantams	3
S7	West Virginia United	1
S1	SC United Bantams	1
S3	North Carolina Fusion U23 (a.e.t.)	2
S3	North Carolina Fusion U23	5
S6	Tampa Bay United	0
E1	West Chester United SC	2
E8	New York Red Bulls U-23	1
E1	West Chester United SC	1
E5	Ocean City Nor'easters	0
E4	Boston Bolts	0
E5	Ocean City Nor'easters	1
Eastern Conference
E2	Western Mass Pioneers	4
E6	Cedar Stars Rush	0
E2	Western Mass Pioneers (p)	0 (5)
E7	Seacoast United Phantoms	0 (4)
E3	Long Island Rough Riders	1
E7	Seacoast United Phantoms (a.e.t.)	2
C1	Des Moines Menace	5
C8	Texas United	0
C1	Des Moines Menace	1
C5	Flint City Bucks	0
C4	Chicago FC United	1
C5	Flint City Bucks	3
Central Conference
C2	Kalamazoo FC	3
C6	Corpus Christi FC	1
C2	Kalamazoo FC (p)	1 (4)
C3	Mississippi Brilla FC	1 (1)
C3	Mississippi Brilla FC	3
C7	Kings Hammer FC	1
Western Conference

Conference Finals
S4	Tormenta FC 2	2
S3	North Carolina Fusion U23 (a.e.t.)	4
E1	West Chester United SC	0
E2	Western Mass Pioneers	1
C1	Des Moines Menace	2
C2	Kalamazoo FC	1
W1	Portland Timbers U23s (p)	3 (4)
W2	Park City Red Wolves	3 (2)

National Semifinals
S3	North Carolina Fusion U23	3
E2	Western Mass Pioneers	1
C1	Des Moines Menace	2
W1	Portland Timbers U23s	0

National Final
S3	North Carolina Fusion U23	0
C1	Des Moines Menace	1

== Conference Playoffs ==
=== Eastern Conference Championship ===
July 16, 2021 Conference Quarterfinals	Long Island Rough Riders	1–2 (a.e.t.)	Seacoast United Phantoms	Lusitano Stadium; Ludlow, Massachusetts
4:30 PM EDT	Kang 25'		59'

July 16, 2021 Conference Quarterfinals	Western Mass Pioneers	4–0	Cedar Stars Rush	Lusitano Stadium; Ludlow, Massachusetts
7:30 PM EDT	Regragui 22', 45'; Agyemang 49'; Lerech 58'; Gutierrez (yellow card); Koduah (yellow card); Viera (yellow card)	Report	Yeboah (red card) 20'; Watkins (yellow card); Leong (yellow card); Martinez (yellow card)

July 17, 2021 Conference Quarterfinals	West Chester United SC	2–1	New York Red Bulls U-23	Evergreen Sportsplex; Leesburg, Virginia
5:00 PM EDT	Cueceoglu 17'; Amspacher 35'	Report	23'

July 17, 2021 Conference Quarterfinals	Boston Bolts	0–1	Ocean City Nor'easters	Evergreen Sportsplex; Leesburg, Virginia
7:00 PM EDT	Hu (yellow card); Bagdon (yellow card)	Report	Quartey (yellow card); Watson (yellow card); Becher 76'; Stafford (yellow card)

July 17, 2021 Conference Semifinal	Western Mass Pioneers	0–0 (a.e.t.) (5–4 p)	Seacoast United Phantoms	Lusitano Stadium; Ludlow, Massachusetts
7:00 PM EDT	Gutierrez (yellow card); Oberrauch (yellow card); Emery (yellow card); Ucar (yellow card); Rose (yellow card); Arriagada (yellow card)	Report	Pierrot (yellow card); Laws (yellow card)

July 18, 2021 Conference Semifinal	West Chester United SC	1–0	Ocean City Nor'easters	Evergreen Sportsplex; Leesburg, Virginia
7:00 PM EDT	Burkhardt 38'	Report

July 23, 2021 Conference Final	West Chester United SC	0–1	Western Mass Pioneers	Eagle Field at Erk Russell Park; Statesboro, Georgia
5:30 PM EDT		Report	Lerech

=== Southern Conference Championship ===
July 16, 2021 Conference Quarterfinals	SC United Bantams	3–1	West Virginia United	South Eastern Freight Lines Soccer Center; Columbia, South Carolina
7:30 PM EDT	Henderson 20'; Shokalook 21'; Kirkwood 33'; Roberts (yellow card); Maule (yellow card); Sojberg (yellow card)	Report	Jennings 12'; Stearn (yellow card); Ogilvie (yellow card)

July 17, 2021 Conference Quarterfinals	North Carolina Fusion U23	5–0	Tampa Bay United	South Eastern Freight Lines Soccer Center; Columbia, South Carolina
4:00 PM EDT

July 17, 2021 Conference Quarterfinals	The Villages SC	2–1	East Atlanta FC	TowneBank Stadium; Newport News, Virginia
5:00 PM EDT	Paiva 10' (yellow card); Vacas 90+5'; Murtha (yellow card)	Report	Oke 41'; Feeney (yellow card)

July 17, 2021 Conference Quarterfinals	Tormenta FC 2	2–0	Lionsbridge FC	TowneBank Stadium; Newport News, Virginia
7:30 PM EDT	Rodriguez 56'; Lawrence 90+1'	Report

July 18, 2021 Conference Semifinal	SC United Bantams	1–2 (a.e.t.)	North Carolina Fusion U23	South Eastern Freight Lines Soccer Center; Columbia, South Carolina
7:00 PM EDT	Shokalook 18'; Wigfall (yellow card); Rohrhirsch (yellow card); Kirkwood (yellow card); Fokam (yellow card)	Report	Miguez 45'; Santos 96'; Clow (yellow card); Molina (yellow card); Bole (yellow card)

July 18, 2021 Conference Semifinal	The Villages SC	2–4 (a.e.t.)	Tormenta FC 2	TowneBank Stadium; Newport News, Virginia
7:00 PM EDT	Deputat 21'; Paiva 34'	Report	Ledoux 5'; Jowers 10'; Barry 112'; Rodriguez 120+3'

July 23, 2021 Conference Final	North Carolina Fusion U23	4–2 (a.e.t.)	Tormenta FC 2	Eagle Field at Erk Russell Park; Statesboro, Georgia
8:00 PM EDT	Gomiero 9' (pen.); Santos 40'; 109'; Duval 113'		Heckenberg 52'; Rodriguez 58'

=== Central Conference Championship ===
July 16, 2021 Conference Quarterfinals	Chicago FC United	1–3	Flint City Bucks	Valley Stadium; West Des Moines, Iowa
4:00 PM CDT	Gutierrez 50'		Cisse 38'; Borczak 75'; Sanchez 90+3'

July 16, 2021 Conference Quarterfinals	Kalamazoo FC	3–1	Corpus Christi FC	Clinton High School; Clinton, Mississippi
5:00 PM CDT	Banuelos 38', 48'; Harmon 67'; Jackson (yellow card); Halloran (yellow card)	Report	Wagner 52'; Butler (yellow card); Cresto (yellow card); Kranick (yellow card)

July 16, 2021 Conference Quarterfinals	Des Moines Menace	5–0	Texas United	Valley Stadium; West Des Moines, Iowa
7:00 PM CDT	Ayats 9', 38', 47'; Rude 15'; Skelton 20'; O'Dwyer (yellow card)	Report	Estrada (yellow card)

July 16, 2021 Conference Quarterfinals	Mississippi Brilla FC	3–1	Kings Hammer FC	Clinton High School; Clinton, Mississippi
7:30 PM CDT	Astorga 5'; James 59' (yellow card); Emeriau 90'; Lozano (yellow card); Morris (yellow card)	Report	Jones 46' (yellow card); Robinson (yellow card)

July 18, 2021 Conference Semifinal	Des Moines Menace	1–0	Flint City Bucks	Valley Stadium; West Des Moines, Iowa
7:00 PM CDT	Haugli 51'; Busquets (yellow card); Thomas (yellow card); Mensah (yellow card); Fernandes (yellow card)	Report	Murana (yellow card); Caliskan (yellow card)

July 18, 2021 Conference Semifinal	Mississippi Brilla FC	1–1 (a.e.t.) (1–4 p)	Kalamazoo FC	Clinton High School; Clinton, Mississippi
7:00 PM CDT	Lozano 90' (yellow card); Onyango (yellow card); Alzate (yellow card); DiLuzio (yellow card)	Report	Banuelos 56'; O'Riordan (yellow card)

July 23, 2021 Conference Final	Des Moines Menace	2–1	Kalamazoo FC	Valley Stadium; West Des Moines, Iowa
7:30 PM CDT	Busquets 45+9'; Walkes 90+4'	Report	O'Riordan 23'; Harmon (red card) 61'

=== Western Conference Championship ===
July 23, 2021 Conference Final	Portland Timbers U23	3–3 (a.e.t.) (4–2 p)	Park City Red Wolves	Valley Stadium; West Des Moines, Iowa
4:30 PM CDT	Afonso 4', 57'; Sosa 11'	Report	Jiba 2'; Wight 63', 88'
	Penalties
	Santos (penalty scored); Rapaport (penalty scored); Brog (penalty scored); Andreou (penalty scored)		(penalty missed) Vargas; (penalty scored) Silva; (penalty scored) Johnson; (penalty missed) Pena

== USL League Two Championship ==
=== Semifinals ===
July 25, 2021 National Semifinal	North Carolina Fusion U23	3–1	Western Mass Pioneers	Eagle Field at Erk Russell Park; Statesboro, Georgia
8:00 PM EDT	Duval 52', 87'; Molina 63'	Report	Agyemang 27'

July 25, 2021 National Semifinal	Des Moines Menace	2–0	Portland Timbers U23	Valley Stadium; West Des Moines, Iowa
7:30 PM CDT	Horveno 55'; Kiner 85' (o.g.)	Report

=== USL League Two Championship ===
July 31, 2021	Des Moines Menace	1–0	North Carolina Fusion U23	Valley Stadium; West Des Moines, Iowa
7:30 PM CDT	Busquets 55'	Report; Report		Attendance: 7,342; Referee: Carl Armstrong

Championship MVP: (Spain) Manel Busquets (DMM)

== Awards ==
=== Individual Awards ===
Award	Winner	Team	Reason	Ref.
Defender of the Year	(England) Toby Sims	SC United Bantams	1,108 minutes; two goals; one assist	
Golden Glove	(United States) Dane Jacomen	West Chester United	0.41 Goals Against Average; 9 Shutouts; 88.4% Save percentage	
Young (U20) Player of the Year	(Ethiopia) Zemedkun Rodriguez	Cedar Stars Rush	991 minutes; seven goals; one assist	
Assists Champion	(Brazil) Joao Gomiero	North Carolina Fusion U23	8 Assists	
Assists Champion	(England) Jake Nicholson	West Virginia United	8 Assists	
Golden Boot	(Argentina) Nicolás Molina	West Virginia United	16 Goals in 13 games	
Most Valuable Player	(Argentina) Nicolás Molina	West Virginia United	16 Goals in 13 games	
Coach of the Year	(Scotland) Mark McKeever	Des Moines Menace	16 of 17 games won	
Goal of the Year	(Mexico) Enrique Bañuelos	Kalamazoo FC	vs Mississippi Brilla FC	
Save of the Year	(United States) Trevor McMullen	East Atlanta FC	Penalty kick save vs Tormenta FC 2	
Goalkeeper of the Year	(United States) Drew Romig	Tormenta FC 2	0.31 Goals Against Average, 5 Shutouts	

=== Monthly Awards ===
Team of the Month
Month	Goalkeeper	Defenders	Midfielders	Forwards	Ref.
May	(United States) Jacomen (WCU)	(Spain) Molina (NCF) (England) Skelton (DMM) (England) Henderson (SCU)	(Sierra Leone) Michael (SGT2) (Ethiopia) Rodriguez (CSR) (United States) Watson (OCN) (United States) Olson (TOL)	(Ghana) Adjei (DMM) (United States) Gilley (CI2) (United States) Popovic (OAK)	
June	(United States) Levine (LIR)	(England) Mellor (WCU) (United States) Lara (KAL) (Colombia) Lazano (MSB)	(England) Marriott (CHE) (England) Cornish (GRA) (Portugal) Santos (NCF) (United States) Gutierrez (CFU)	(Argentina) Lerech (WMP) (Liberia) Sesay (MAN) (United States) Becher (OCN)	

Goal of the Month
Month	Player	Club	Opponent	Ref.
May	(Portugal) Henrique Santos	North Carolina Fusion U23	Lionsbridge FC	
June	(Spain) Noe Garcia	Fort Wayne FC	Dayton Dutch Lions	

Save of the Month
Month	Player	Club	Opponent	Ref.
May	(Netherlands) Patrick Timmer	Tri-Cities Otters	North Carolina Fusion U23	
June	(Serbia) Marko Rajic	FC Miami City	Tampa Bay United	

=== Weekly Awards ===
Goal of the Week
Week	Player	Club	Opponent	Ref.
2	(Sierra Leone) Rodney Michael	Tormenta FC 2	Southern Soccer Academy Kings	
3	(United States) Colin clarke	Toledo Villa FC	Dayton Dutch Lions	
4	(Portugal) Henrique Santos	North Carolina Fusion U23	Lionsbridge FC	
5	(United States) Lance Crabtree	Little Rock Rangers	Texas United	
6	(Colombia) Rafael Bustamante	Manhattan SC	Westchester Flames	
7	(England) James Thomas	Des Moines Menace	FC Wichita	
8	(Spain) Noe Garcia	Fort Wayne FC	Dayton Dutch Lions	
9	(Canada) Albert Kang	Long Island Rough Riders	Westchester Flames	
10	(Spain) Cristobal Moliona	North Carolina Fusion U23	West Virginia United	
Conference Quarterfinals and Semifinals	(Mexico) Enrique Bañuelos	Kalamazoo FC	Mississippi Brilla FC	
Conference Finals and National Semifinals	(Canada) Reshaun Walkes	Des Moines Menace	Kalamazoo FC	

Save of the Week
2	(United States) Daniel Namani	Houston FC	Little Rock Rangers
3	(Netherlands) Patrick Timmer	Tri-Cities Otters	North Carolina Fusion U23
4	(United States) Max Blacker	Real Central New Jersey	Philadelphia Lone Star FC
5	(Serbia) Marko Rajic	FC Miami City	Tampa Bay United
6	(Spain) Alejandro Chavarria	Mississippi Brilla FC	Little Rock Rangers
7	(United States) Trevor McMullen	East Atlanta FC	Tormenta FC 2
8	(United States) Gunther Rankenburg	Peachtree City MOBA	Charlotte Independence 2
9	(Guatemala) Giancarlo Martinez	Virginia Beach United	North Carolina FC U23
10	(United States) Roman Gabriel	OVF Alliance	Portland Timbers U23
Conference Quarterfinals and Conference Semifinals	(United States) Parker Smith	Kalamazoo FC	Mississippi Brilla FC
Conference Finals and National Semifinals	(United States) Trevor Wilson	Portland Timbers U23	Park City Red Wolves SC

== All-League and All-Conference Teams ==
=== Eastern Conference ===
F: (United States) Tyler Bagley (BOS) *, (United States) Simon Becher (OCN), (Liberia) Amara Sesay (MAN)
M: (Ethiopia) Zemedkun Rodriguez (CSR), (United States) Conor Bradley (WCU), (Germany) Okan Gölge (NJC), (United States) Ryan Becher (REA)
D: (United States) Maurice Williams (NYR), (United States) Shane Bradley (WCU), (England) Luca Mellor (WCU) *
G: (Germany) Jan Hoffelner (NJC)

=== Central Conference ===
F: (Liberia) Cyrus Harmon (KAL) *, (United States) Jalen James (MBR), (Spain) Pol Monells (TEX)
M: (Spain) Manel Busquets (DMM), (United States) Daniel Barlow (KHM), (Republic of Ireland) Daire O’Riordan (KAL) *, (England) Harvey Slade (FCB)
D: (England) Jordan Skelton (DMM) *, (England) George Proctor (FCB), (France) Paul Efang (KAL)
G: (Spain) Alejandro Chavarria (MBR)

=== Southern Conference ===
F: (France) Alexis Ledoux (SGT), (United States) Charles Touche (LIO), (Argentina) Nicolás Molina (WVU) *
M: (France) Arnaud Baron (SCU) *, (Brazil) Joao Gomiero (NCF) *, (Brazil) Gabriel Cabral (SGT) *, (Brazil) Daniel Oliveira (VIL)
D: (England) Alex Henderson (SCU), (England) Toby Sims (SCU) *, (Spain) Cristobal Molina (NCF)
G: (United States) Drew Romig (SGT) *

=== Western Conference ===
F: (Ukraine) Ivan Mykhailenko (POR), (Spain) Jose Carlos González (LAN), (Guinea) Evan Hoover (OVF)
M: (United States) David Brog (POR), (United States) Jose Sosa (POR), (United States) Wesley Frankel (OVF), (Canada) Henry Cromack (LAN)
D: (United States) Esai Easley (POR), (United States) Emory Rapaport (POR), (United States) Carter Payne (PDX)
G: (Spain) Albert Escuin (LAN)

* denotes All-League player
