= Mike Vest =

American sports executive (born 1978)

- Born: March 20, 1978 (age 48); Topeka, Kansas, U.S.
- Education: University of Kansas
- Occupation: Sports executive
- Known for: Co-founder of Lionsbridge FC and former senior executive at Big Ten Network, IMG and Atlantic 10 Conference.

Mike Vest is an American sports executive who co-founded Lionsbridge FC in USL League Two, and previously held senior-level roles at the Atlantic 10 Conference, IMG and Big Ten Network.

== Early life ==
Vest grew up in Overland Park, Kan and graduated from the University of Kansas.

== Career ==
While still an undergraduate, Vest began his career at the University of Kansas under the tutelage of future CoSIDA Hall of Famers Doug Vance and Dean Buchan.

From 2000-07, Vest worked in the athletic department at Wake Forest University, most closely with the men's soccer, baseball and football programs.

In 2007, Vest relocated to Chicago to help launch the Big Ten Network as one of its original 25 employees. He managed public relations and publicity for network executives and talent. Vest also oversaw social media and developed one of the television industry's first Second Screen experiences with BTN Connect in conjunction with Spredfast.

In 2014, Vest joined the Atlantic 10 Conference as Associate Commissioner for External Affairs. There, Vest managed the league's television and digital media rights, leading negotiations made the Atlantic 10 Conference to become the first NCAA conference to sign a media rights agreement with Facebook.

In 2017, Vest partnered with Virginia business executives Kevin Joyce and Dan Chenoweth to plan the launch of Lionsbridge FC, which began play in 2018.

== Personal life ==
Vest is a lifelong fan of the Kansas City Royals, Kansas City Chiefs and Chicago Cubs.
