= Texas United =

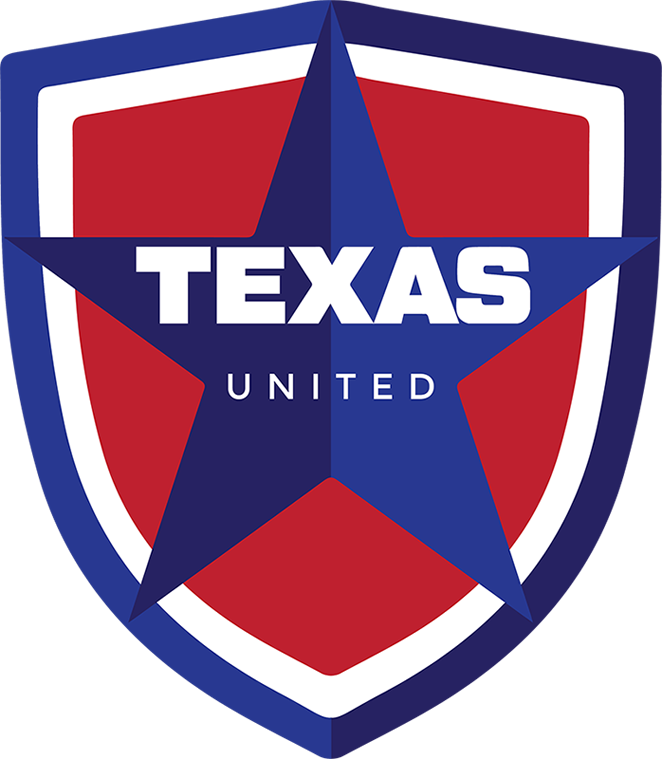
- Full name: Texas United Football Club
- Nicknames: Texans, Los Tejanos
- Founded: 2017; 9 years ago
- Stadium: John Clark Stadium; Plano, Texas
- Capacity: 14,224
- Owner: Kiran Devaprasad
- President: Vacant
- Head Coach: Vacant
- League: USL League Two
- 2023: 1st, Mid South Division; Playoffs: Conference Semifinals
- Website: http://txunitedfc.com/
Home colors	Away colors

Texas United is an American soccer club that currently competes in USL League Two, the fourth tier of the American Soccer Pyramid. The club plays its home games at the John Clark Stadium.

In March 2017, it was announced that the club had been granted a franchise license for USL League 2, to operate in the Dallas–Fort Worth metroplex area.

The team is owned by Neltex Sports Group who are also owners of the Texas Airhogs and co-owners of the NBA G League franchise the Texas Legends.

== History ==
=== 2017 season ===
The club was founded in March 2017 and announced Ryan Higginbotham as the club's inaugural head coach. The Texans finished the season with a respectful 5–8–1.

=== Arez Ardalani Era (2018-2022) ===
In January 2018 Neltex Sports Group hired Arez Ardalani as the new head coach of Texas United. Signings of new players saw plenty of FC Dallas college based players added to the roster. The Texans started the season very strong with a 5–0 victory against FC Cleburne at home and a 3–2 victory against OKC Energy U23 away. After multiple away games and a tough schedule the Texans were able to set the franchise record at 5–6–3, with multiple team and individual honors. As a result of the successful season many players were invited to or signed professional contracts with USL organizations such as Pittsburgh Riverhounds SC and North Texas SC.

Texas United started its 2019 season with early spring exhibitions against USL Championship clubs such as El Paso Locomotive FC, OKC Energy, and Swope Park Rangers. After the spring season Texas United moved forward with signing multiple trialist that impressed during the exhibition matches. The club had its 2019 season opener against Houston Dynamo USL 2 franchise Brazos Valley Cavalry FC.

Spring season play began in January with Texas United playing El Paso Locomotive FC. Before the beginning of the 2020 USL Championship season the squad went down to play the Austin Bold FC. The USL League 2 season was cancelled due to COVID-19.

2021 was a historic season for Texas United. The team made playoffs for the first time in club history and posted a franchise record of 6–5–3.

Texas United won their first trophy in 2022 by clinching the USL2 MidSouth Division championship in historic fashion. The club went undefeated with a 9–0–5 record, the only non-MLS club to do so in the division's 20-year history. Texas United finished the season ranked 12th out of 113 clubs in the regular seasons final power rankings. Arez Ardalani left the club after the season, ending his era which took the Texas United project from a low tier USL 2 club to a top 15 tier 1 club.

=== Dave Jacobs One and Done (2023) ===
After Ardalani's departure to Vancouver FC of the Canadian Premier League new ownership decided to hire Dave Jacobs as the new head coach. The season ended in another MidSouth Division championship, however due to the owners record high financial spending for the 2023 season and only doing marginally better than last season the club could not return for the 2024 USL2 season.

== Players and staff ==
=== Team management ===
Coaching staff
Head Coach & Technical Director	Vacant
Associate Head Coach	Vacant
Assistant Coach	Vacant
Assistant Coach & Goalkeeper Coach	Vacant
Head Athletic Trainer	Vacant

- Last updated: 1 January 2023

== Record ==
=== Year–by–year ===
Year	Division	League	Regular season	Record (W-D-L)	Playoffs	Open Cup
2017	4	USL PDL	4th, Mid South	5-1-8	Did not qualify	Did not qualify
2018	4	USL PDL	5th, Mid South	5-3-6	Did not qualify	Did not qualify
2019	4	USL League Two	5th, Mid South	2-1-11	Did not qualify	Did not qualify
2020	4	USL League Two	Season cancelled due to COVID-19 pandemic			
2021	4	USL League Two	3rd, Mid South	6-3-5	Conference Quarterfinals	Did not qualify
2022	4	USL League Two	1st, Mid South	9-5-0	Conference Quarterfinals	Did not qualify
2023	4	USL League Two	1st, Mid South	10-2-0	Conference Semifinals	Qualified but rejected invitation to participate

=== Head coaches ===
- Includes USL 2 Regular season

Coach	Nationality	Start	End	Games	Win	Draw	Loss	Win %
Ryan Higginbotham	United States	April 1, 2017	July 30, 2017	14	5	1	8	35.71
Arez Ardalani	United States	January 29, 2018	December 15, 2022	52	22	12	18	42.31
Hassan Nemati (Interim)	United States	June 10, 2019	June 24, 2019	4	0	0	4	0.00
Dave Jacobs	United States	January 1, 2023	December 1, 2023	12	10	2	0	83.33

== Honors ==
=== USL League Two ===
- Division Champions (1)
  - MidSouth Division Champions: 2022, 2023
- USL League Two Playoffs (2)
  - 2021, 2022

== Stadium ==
- AirHogs Stadium (2017–2020), capacity 5,500

The club played in AirHogs Stadium, a baseball park that was also the home field for the Texas AirHogs of the American Association of Independent Professional Baseball. The venue featured a 17,000 square-foot Wide World of Parks Kids Zone, restaurant/sports bar, cigar bar and swimming pool. It seated 5,500 and offered 13 luxury suites.

The facility had housed a number of minor league franchises, college sporting events and concerts such as the Dallas Desire, NJCAA College Baseball, High school Baseball, WAC Baseball Tournament and the NCAA Division II Baseball World Series in 2017.

- University of Texas at Dallas (2021)

With AirHogs Stadium being bought for conversion to a cricket-specific stadium, the club's home games were played primarily at the University of Texas at Dallas beginning in the 2021 season, though their schedule also showed home dates at two public schools: Arlington Heights High School and Gateway Field at Gateway Charter Academy.
