= Nicolás Molina =

Argentinian footballer

Personal information
- Full name: Nicolás Martin Molina
- Date of birth: 28 January 1999 (age 27)
- Place of birth: Buenos Aires, Argentina
- Height: 6 ft 4 in (1.93 m)
- Position: Forward

Team information
- Current team: Temperley

Youth career
- St. Catherines Moorlands School
- 2018–2019: River Plate

College career
Years	Team	Apps	(Gls)
2019–2021	St. Francis Brooklyn Terriers	35	(8)
2021	UNC Wilmington Seahawks	16	(6)

Senior career*
Years	Team	Apps	(Gls)
2021	West Virginia United	13	(16)
2022	North Carolina FC	18	(2)
2023	Fénix	28	(8)
2024	Talleres RdE	37	(4)
2025	Vinotinto	14	(3)
2025–2026	San Luis	10	(6)
2026–	Temperley	3	(1)
- * Club domestic league appearances and goals as of 17:54, 20 April 2026 (UTC)

Nicolás Martin Molina (born 28 January 1999) is an Argentine footballer who plays for Temperley.

== Career ==
=== Youth and college ===
Molina attended St. Catherine's Moorlands School in Buenos Aires, where he scored 69 goals in 73 games and was named Best Player of the Division in 2015. Molina also played with the academy of local side Boca de Zona Norte. He began attending Austral University in Argentina, before playing in a local amateur tournament that earned him a trial with River Plate, who he later signed for, leaving university to do so.

In 2019, Molina had the opportunity to move to the United States to play college soccer, earning a scholarship to attend St. Francis College in Brooklyn, New York. He made 35 appearances for the Terriers, scoring eight goals and tallying seven assists across three seasons, including a truncated season due to the COVID-19 pandemic. For the 2020–21 season, Molina was named NEC Men's Soccer Player of the Year.

For his senior year, Molina transferred to the University of North Carolina Wilmington, going on to score six times in 16 games for the Seahawks, and was a Second-Team All-Colonial Athletic Association selection.

Molina also played with USL League Two club West Virginia United during their 2021 season, where he earned both the 2021 League Two MVP award and the Golden Boot award after scoring 16 goals in just 13 games for the team in the regular season. His goals helped lead West Virginia to a third-place finish in the South Atlantic Division.

=== Professional ===
On 17 February 2022, Molina signed with USL League One side North Carolina FC. He made his professional debut on 18 June 2022, starting and scoring during a 2–0 win over Charlotte Independence.

In the second half of 2025, Molina moved to Chile and joined San Luis de Quillota from Ecuadorian club Vinotinto.

== Personal ==
Nicólas is the younger brother of professional footballer Tomás Molina.

== Career statistics ==
=== Club ===
As of 24 May 2025.

Appearances and goals by club, season and competition
Club	Division	League			Cup		Total	
Club	Division	Season	Apps	Goals	Apps	Goals	Apps	Goals
North Carolina FC	USL League One	2022	18	2	—		18	2
Fénix	Primera B Metropolitana	2023	31	8	—		31	8
Talleres (RdE)	Primera B Nacional	2024	37	4	4	0	41	4
Vinotinto Ecuador	Serie A	2025	10	3	—		10	3
Career total			96	17	4	0	100	17

== Honours ==
=== Individual ===
West Virginia United

- USL League Two Golden Boot Award: 2021
- USL League Two Most Valuable Player Award: 2021
