= Daniel de Oliveira =

Daniel de Oliveira may refer to:

- Daniel de Oliveira (actor) (born 1977), Brazilian actor
- Daniel De Oliveira (chess player) (born 1931), Portuguese chess player
- Daniel de Oliveira (footballer) (born 1970), Venezuelan footballer

== See also ==
- Daniel Oliveira (disambiguation)
