= Patrick Agyemang (soccer, born 2000) =

American soccer player (born 2000)

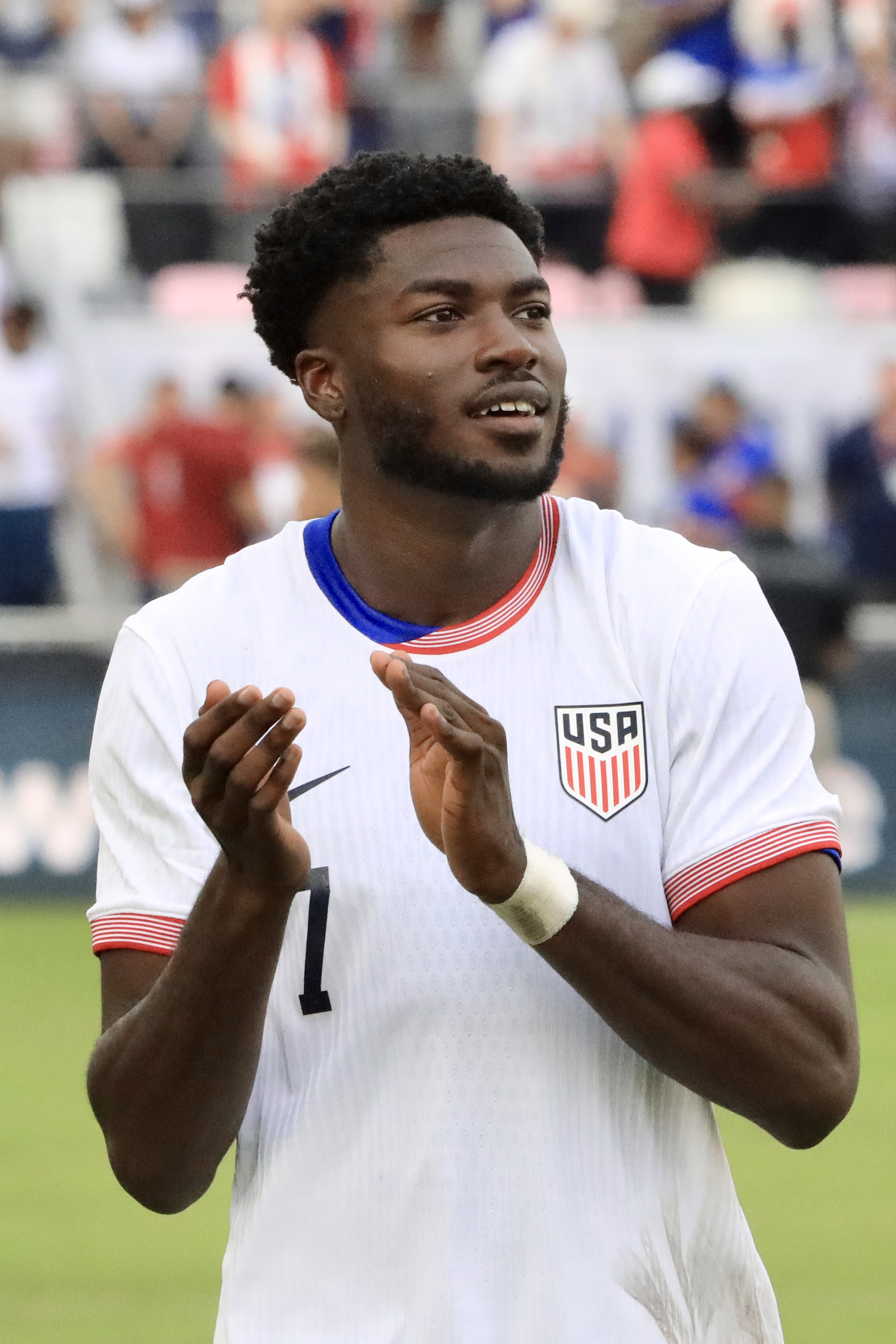
- Agyemang with the United States in 2025

Personal information
- Full name: Patrick Kwakye Agyemang
- Date of birth: November 7, 2000 (age 25)
- Place of birth: East Hartford, Connecticut, U.S.
- Height: 6 ft 4 in (1.93 m)
- Position: Forward

Team information
- Current team: Derby County
- Number: 7

Youth career
- 2015–2018: Hartford Hellions

College career
| Years | Team | Apps | (Gls) |
| 2018–2019 | Eastern Connecticut Warriors | 39 | (30) |
| 2020–2022 | Rhode Island Rams | 37 | (19) |

Senior career*
| Years | Team | Apps | (Gls) |
| 2021 | Western Mass Pioneers | 13 | (5) |
| 2023–2025 | Charlotte FC | 59 | (17) |
| 2023 | → Crown Legacy FC (loan) | 11 | (10) |
| 2025– | Derby County | 37 | (10) |

International career^{‡}
| 2025– | United States | 14 | (6) |
Medal record
Representing United States
Men's football
CONCACAF Gold Cup
| Runner-up | 2025 |
- * Club domestic league appearances and goals as of 16:34, April 3, 2026 (UTC) ‡ National team caps and goals as of 17:37, April 2, 2026 (UTC)

Patrick Kwakye Agyemang (/ˈɔːdʒiːmɔːn/, AW-jee-mawn, born November 7, 2000) is an American professional soccer player who plays as a forward for EFL Championship club Derby County and the United States national team.

Prior to fully professional soccer, Agyemang played a single season with USL League Two club Western Mass Pioneers, with whom he won the Eastern Conference title with in 2021. Agyemang was selected 12th overall in the 2023 MLS SuperDraft by Charlotte FC after two seasons each of college soccer with the Eastern Connecticut Warriors and Rhode Island Rams, respectively. In his first season of professional soccer, Agyemang split his time between Charlotte FC and their MLS Next Pro reserve team, Crown Legacy FC, but the following season he was fully incorporated into Charlotte FC's first team. In 2025, Agyemang received his first call-up to the United States national team, and was later selected for the 2025 CONCACAF Gold Cup, during which he helped the United States place runners-up behind Mexico. Later that year, after three seasons in Major League Soccer, Agyemang transferred to EFL Championship club Derby County for a Charlotte FC club record fee.

== Early career ==
=== Youth career ===
Agyemang was born in East Hartford, Connecticut to Ghanaian parents. He and his family called his childhood home in East Hartford "the Headquarters". He attended East Hartford High School where he was a varsity starter in soccer for two years and was named all-conference in 2017. While in high school, Agyemang also played club soccer for the Hartford Hellions Soccer Club.

=== College career ===
==== Eastern Connecticut Warriors ====
In 2018, Agyemang attended Eastern Connecticut State University to play college soccer. In two seasons with the Warriors, Agyemang made 39 appearances, scoring 30 goals and tallying 10 assists. In his freshman season, he was named LEC Rookie of the Year and LEC first-team. Agyemang was awarded the LEC Offensive Player-of-the-Year, a first-team All-LEC pick nomination and a first-team USC All-New England Region selection during his sophomore season. He was also named United Soccer Coaches Division III third team after leading the conference in scoring with 21 goals.

==== Rhode Island Rams ====
In 2020, Agyemang transferred to the University of Rhode Island, where he netted 19 times in 37 appearances for the Rams, also adding 12 assists. He was named Atlantic 10 All-Conference First Team in both his junior and senior years and was Atlantic 10 All-Championship Team in 2021. Agyemang was also included on the MAC Hermann Trophy Watch list going into his final season with Rhode Island.

== Club career ==
=== Western Mass Pioneers ===
While at college, Agyemang also competed in the USL League Two with Western Mass Pioneers in 2021, scoring six goals in 15 appearances across the regular season and playoffs as he helped the team win the Eastern Conference title.

=== Charlotte FC ===
==== 2023: Breaking into the first team ====
On December 22, 2022, Charlotte FC selected Agyemang with the 12th overall selection in the 2023 MLS SuperDraft following a trade with Colorado Rapids. Charlotte traded their first-round pick in the 2024 MLS SuperDraft, in addition to up to $100,000 of General Allocation Money in order to draft him. He officially signed with the Major League Soccer team on February 24, 2023. Agyemang scored his first MLS goal on June 11, 2023, against the Seattle Sounders in a 3–3 draw.

On July 11, 2023, in MLS Next Pro, Agyemang was chosen as Player of the Matchday for scoring a brace in two minutes as Crown Legacy FC defeated Atlanta United 2 with a 3–1 scoreline. Agyemang was chosen as co-player of the month alongside New York Red Bulls II's Ibrahim Kasule for scoring back-to-back braces and providing an assist across two matches in July 2023.

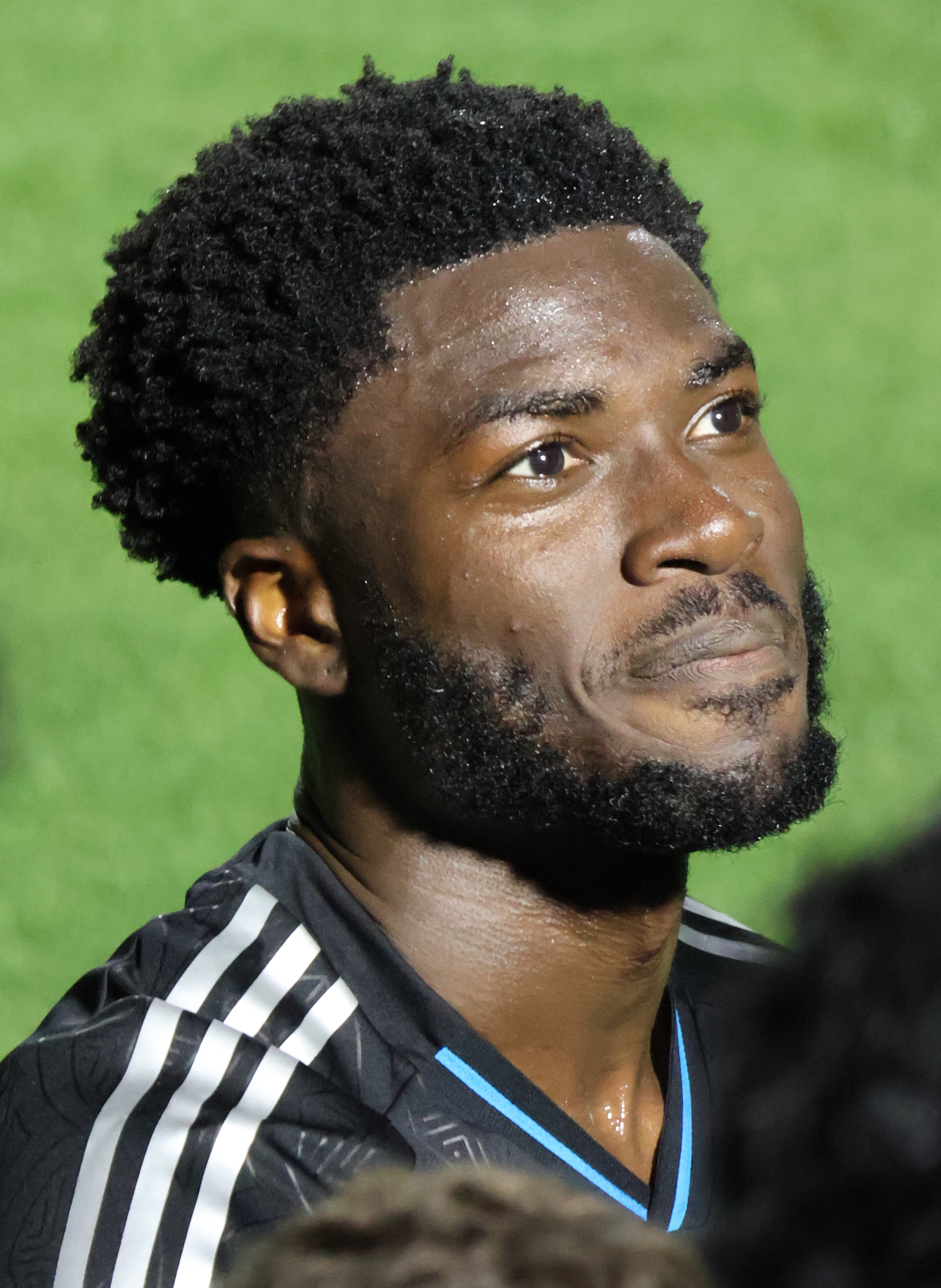
Agyemang with Charlotte FC in 2025

==== 2024–25: Charlotte FC's striker ====
On June 26, 2024, one of Agyemang's goals was voted Goal of the Matchday as he scored a brace in a 2–0 win over Philadelphia Union four days earlier. On September 23, 2024, Agyemang was named to the Team of the Matchday for the first time in his career for scoring a goal and assisting two in a 4–0 win over the New England Revolution two days earlier after coming on as a substitute.

On May 26, 2025, Agyemang was named to the Team of the Matchday for the second time in his career, this time for scoring a brace in a 3–2 win over Columbus Crew. In June 2025, Agyemang placed ninth among all MLS players for jersey sales behind teammate Wilfried Zaha in seventh.

=== Derby County ===
On July 15, 2025, Agyemang was signed by EFL Championship club Derby County on a four-year contract for a club record sale for Charlotte FC, although the exact fee was not disclosed. The club announced that Agyemang would be undergoing hernia surgery and that he would miss the start of the 2025–26 season. On September 13, Agyemang made his debut in a 1–0 win at West Bromwich Albion, as a 69th-minute substitute for Ben Brereton Díaz. Agyemang assisted the only goal of the game for Andreas Weimann in the 84th-minute. On October 4, Agyemang scored his first goal for Derby County via a cross from Weimann to secure a 1–1 draw against Southampton. On December 15, Agyemang scored his first brace for Derby County in a 3–0 win at Sheffield Wednesday. On April 6, 2026, Agyemang suffered a non-contact injury in the first half of a league match against Stoke City after appearing to land awkwardly after challenging for a ball in the air, and had to be taken off the pitch on a stretcher. A day later, a scan of the injury confirmed a "serious" Achilles tendon injury, with Derby County not giving a time scale on his possible return to action. In his first season at Derby, Agyemang scored 10 goals and registered four assists in 37 league appearances.

== International career ==
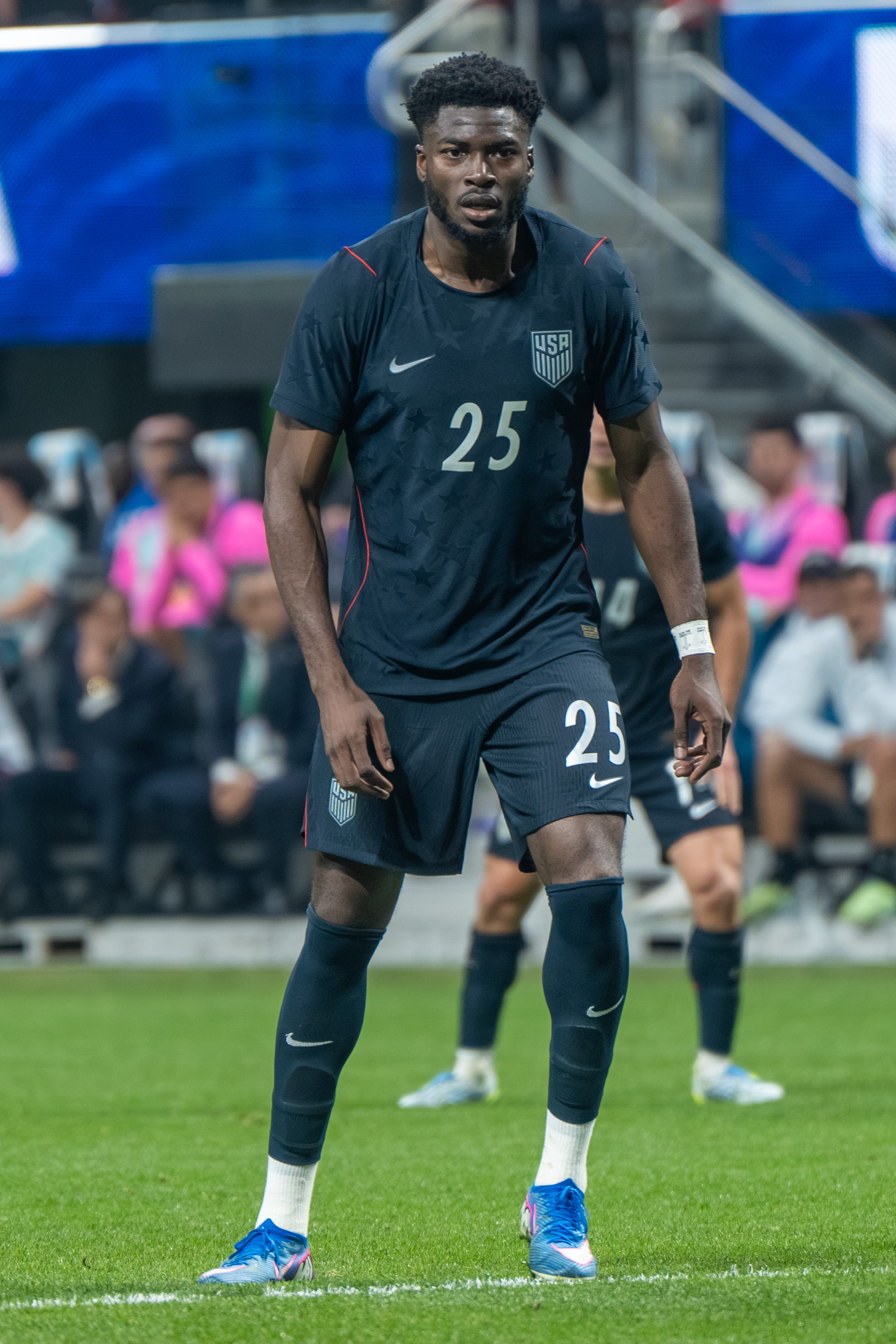
Agyemang with the United States men's national team in 2026

On January 6, 2025, Agyemang received his first call-up to the United States men's national team (USMNT) for training camp and friendly matches against Venezuela and Costa Rica. Agyemang made his international debut on January 18 against Venezuela and scored his first international goal to help secure a 3–1 win. In the following match against Costa Rica four days later Agyemang scored again in a 3–0 win. On June 5, Agyemang was selected by head coach Mauricio Pochettino for the 2025 CONCACAF Gold Cup. Agyemang scored his first goal of the tournament, albeit via a deflected shot from Diego Luna, as the USMNT defeated Trinidad & Tobago by a 5–0 score line on June 15. On June 23, Agyemang scored his first intentional goal of the tournament, a game-winning goal, in a 2–1 win over Haiti in the final group stage match.

On March 17, 2026, Agyemang received his first call-up of the year for two friendlies against Belgium and Portugal on March 28 and March 31 respectively. In the USMNT's match against Belgium, Agyemang scored his first goal of the year for the national team late in the second half of a 5–2 loss. The following month, Agyemang was ruled out of the 2026 FIFA World Cup, which was co-hosted by the United States, after suffering an Achilles tendon injury during a match for his club, Derby County.

== Career statistics ==
=== Club ===
As of match played April 6, 2026

Appearances and goals by club, season and competition
| Club | Season | League | | | National cup (Note: Includes U.S. Open Cup, FA Cup) | | League cup (Note: Includes EFL Cup) | | Other | | Total | |
| Club | Season | Division | Apps | Goals | Apps | Goals | Apps | Goals | Apps | Goals | Apps | Goals |
|---|---|---|---|---|---|---|---|---|---|---|---|---|
| Western Mass Pioneers | 2021 | USL League Two | 13 | 5 | — | | — | | 2 (Note: Appearances in USL League Two playoffs) | 1 | 15 | 6 |
| Charlotte FC | 2023 | Major League Soccer | 12 | 1 | 1 | 0 | — | | 5 (Note: Four appearances and two goals in Leagues Cup, one appearance and one goal in MLS Cup playoffs) | 3 | 18 | 4 |
| Charlotte FC | 2024 | Major League Soccer | 31 | 10 | — | | — | | 5 (Note: Two appearances in Leagues Cup, three appearances in MLS Cup playoffs) | 0 | 36 | 10 |
| Charlotte FC | 2025 | Major League Soccer | 16 | 2 | 2 | 2 | — | | — | | 18 | 4 |
| Charlotte FC | Total | | 59 | 17 | 3 | 2 | — | | 4 | 1 | 72 | 22 |
| Crown Legacy (loan) | 2023 | MLS Next Pro | 11 | 10 | — | | — | | 1 (Note: Appearance in MLS Next Pro playoffs) | 0 | 12 | 10 |
| Derby County | 2025–26 | EFL Championship | 37 | 10 | 1 | 0 | 0 | 0 | — | | 38 | 10 |
| Derby County | 2026–27 | EFL Championship | 0 | 0 | 0 | 0 | 0 | 0 | — | | 0 | 0 |
| Derby County | Total | | 37 | 10 | 1 | 0 | 0 | 0 | — | | 38 | 10 |
| Career total | | | 120 | 38 | 4 | 2 | 0 | 0 | 7 | 2 | 137 | 44 |

=== International ===
As of match played March 31, 2026

Appearances and goals by national team and year
| National team | Year | Apps | Goals |
|---|---|---|---|
| United States | 2025 | 12 | 5 |
| United States | 2026 | 2 | 1 |
| Total | | 14 | 6 |

United States score listed first, score column indicates score after each Agyemang goal.

List of international goals scored by Patrick Agyemang
| No. | Date | Venue | Cap | Opponent | Score | Result | Competition |
|---|---|---|---|---|---|---|---|
| 1 | January 18, 2025 | Chase Stadium, Fort Lauderdale, United States | 1 | Venezuela | 2–0 | 3–1 | Friendly |
| 2 | January 22, 2025 | Inter&Co Stadium, Orlando, United States | 2 | Costa Rica | 3–0 | 3–0 | Friendly |
| 3 | March 23, 2025 | SoFi Stadium, Inglewood, United States | 4 | Canada | 1–1 | 1–2 | 2025 CONCACAF Nations League Finals |
| 4 | June 15, 2025 | PayPal Park, San Jose, United States | 7 | Trinidad and Tobago | 3–0 | 5–0 | 2025 CONCACAF Gold Cup |
| 5 | June 22, 2025 | AT&T Stadium, Arlington, United States | 9 | Haiti | 2–1 | 2–1 | 2025 CONCACAF Gold Cup |
| 6 | March 28, 2026 | Mercedes-Benz Stadium, Atlanta, United States | 13 | Belgium | 2–5 | 2–5 | Friendly |

== Honors ==
Western Mass Pioneers

- Northeast Division regular season: 2021
- Eastern Conference Championship: 2021

United States

- CONCACAF Gold Cup runner-up: 2025

Individual

- Little East Conference Men's Soccer Rookie of the Year: 2018
- Little East Conference Men's Soccer All-Conference Team: 2018, 2019
- Little East Conference Men's Soccer Offensive Player of the Year: 2019
- United Soccer Coaches NCAA Division III Men's All-America Third Team: 2019
- Atlantic 10 All-Conference First Team: 2021, 2022
- Atlantic 10 All-Championship Team: 2021
