= Diego Gutierrez (soccer, born 1999) =

American soccer player (born 1999)

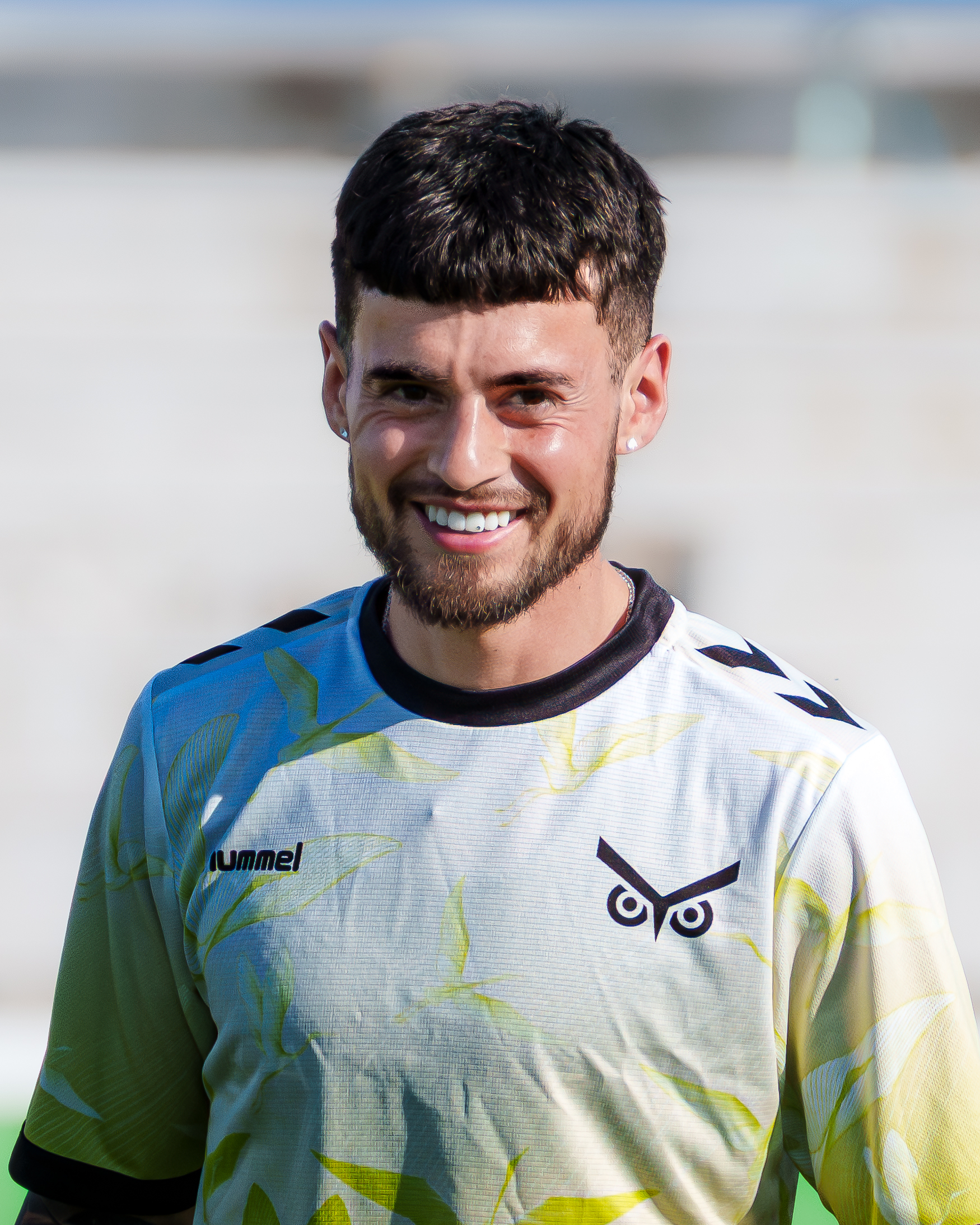
- Gutierrez with Union Omaha in 2026

Personal information
- Date of birth: January 5, 1999 (age 27)
- Place of birth: Omaha, Nebraska, United States
- Height: 5 ft 11 in (1.80 m)
- Position: Forward

Team information
- Current team: Union Omaha
- Number: 17

Youth career
- Elite Academy

College career
Years	Team	Apps	(Gls)
2017–2019	Omaha Mavericks	44	(10)
2020–2021	Creighton Bluejays	30	(15)

Senior career*
Years	Team	Apps	(Gls)
2021	Chicago FC United	10	(7)
2022–2023	Portland Timbers	10	(0)
2022–2023	→ Portland Timbers 2 (loan)	21	(7)
2024	Charleston Battery	16	(0)
2024–2025	Monterey Bay FC	14	(1)
2026–	Union Omaha	29	(9)
- * Club domestic league appearances and goals as of October 31, 2026

Diego Gutierrez (born January 5, 1999) is an American professional soccer player who plays as a forward for Union Omaha in USL League One.

== Early life ==
Gutierrez grew up in Omaha, Nebraska. In his youth, he played in the local Latino Sunday league in Omaha. He also played youth soccer with Elite Academy.

Gutierrez played high school soccer at Ralston High School, finishing his time there as the state's all-time leading goal scorer with 112 goals as well as tallying 43 assists. He was a four-time All-State selection and also earned All-Nebraska First Team honors.

== College career ==
In 2017, Gutierrez began attending the University of Nebraska Omaha, where he played for the men's soccer team. On October 14, 2017, he scored his first collegiate goal, in a match against the Michigan Wolverines. At the end of his freshman season, he was named to the Summit League All-Newcomer Team and the All-Tournament Team. In his sophomore season, he scored braces in two matches against the Purdue Fort Wayne Mastodons on September 29 and the Western Illinois Leathernecks on October 13, earning Summit League Offensive Player of the Week for both performances. At the end of the season, he was named to the All-Summit League First Team. In his junior season, he helped them reach the Summit League final, where they were defeated by the Denver Pioneers.

In 2020, Gutierrez transferred to Creighton University for his senior year to play for the men's soccer team, The 2020 season was delayed to the spring of 2021 due to the COVID-19 pandemic, and he was drafted in the 2021 MLS SuperDraft in January 2021 before appearing in a match for Creighton. However, rather than to turn professional, he opted to complete his collegiate eligibility with Creighton first. He scored his first goals for Creighton on March 6, 2021, netting a brace against the Xavier Musketeers. In April 2021, he was named the Big East Conference Offensive Player of the Week. At the end of the season, he was named the Big East Offensive Player of the Year, and was named to the All-Big East First Team and the All-East Region Second Team. He then returned for a fifth collegiate season in the fall of 2021 and was named the Big East Preseason Co-Offensive Player of the Year and selected to the All-Big East Preseason Team. He earned another two Big East Offensive Player of the Week honors that season and helped Creighton reach the NCAA Tournament. At the end of the season, for the second consecutive season, he was named the Big East Offensive Player of the Year and selected to the All-Big East First Team, after leading the conference in both goals (10) and assists (7). He was also named to the All-East Region First Team, All-American Second Team, and the TopDrawerSoccer Postseason Best XI Second Team.

== Club career ==
At the 2021 MLS SuperDraft, Gutierrez was selected in the third round (70th overall) by the Portland Timbers. However, he remained at his university for another year, before pursuing his professional career. In the summer of 2021, he played with Chicago FC United in USL League Two.

Gutierrez then joined the Timbers for their 2022 preseason, appearing in all their of the team's exhibition matches. In February 2022, he signed a one-year contract with the club, with option years from 2023 to 2025. He made his professional debut in Major League Soccer on March 12, 2022, appearing as an 87th–minute substitute during a 1–0 win over Austin FC. He also spent some time with the club's second team, Portland Timbers 2, in MLS Next Pro. In April 2022, he underwent foot surgery, causing him to miss the next five months of the season. On September 19, 2022, while playing for the second team, he scored a brace in a 2–0 victory over the Tacoma Defiance, and on August 9, 2023, he scored a hat trick in a 6–1 victory over LA Galaxy II. After the 2023 season, the club declined his option for the 2024 season.

Gutierrez signed with Charleston Battery of the USL Championship on January 17, 2024. He moved to fellow Championship side Monterey Bay F.C. after a transfer on August 22, 2024. He departed the club following the 2025 season.

On 16 March 2026, Gutierrez joined Union Omaha in USL League One.

== Personal life ==
Gutierrez is of Mexican descent and holds dual American and Mexican citizenship.

== Career statistics ==
As of November 24, 2023

Appearances and goals by club, season, and competition
Club	Season	League			Playoffs		National cup		Continental		Other		Total	
Club	Season	Division	Apps	Goals	Apps	Goals	Apps	Goals	Apps	Goals	Apps	Goals	Apps	Goals
Chicago FC United	2021	USL League Two	10	7	1	1	—		—		—		11	8
Portland Timbers	2022	Major League Soccer	1	0	—		0	0	—		—		1	0
Portland Timbers	2023	Major League Soccer	9	0	—		2	0	–		0	0	11	0
Portland Timbers	Total		10	0	0	0	2	0	0	0	0	0	12	0
Portland Timbers 2 (loan)	2022	MLS Next Pro	6	2	—		—		—		—		6	2
Portland Timbers 2 (loan)	2023	MLS Next Pro	15	5	—		—		—		—		15	5
Portland Timbers 2 (loan)	Total		21	7	0	0	0	0	0	0	0	0	21	7
Career total			41	14	1	1	2	0	!0	0	0	0	44	15
