= Eugene Van Taylor =

American soccer player and coach

Personal information
- Full name: Eugene Van Taylor, Jr.
- Date of birth: May 16, 1953 (age 73)
- Place of birth: Portsmouth, Ohio, United States
- Position: Goalkeeper

Youth career
- –1974: Erskine College

Senior career*
Years	Team	Apps	(Gls)
1976	Miami Toros	18	(0)
1977	Fort Lauderdale Strikers	0	(0)
1978	New York Eagles	20	(0)
1979–1980	Columbus Magic		
1980	Baltimore Blast (indoor)	6	(0)
1980–1984	Phoenix Inferno (indoor)	51	(0)

Managerial career
- 1985–2015: Lander University
- 2011–2012: Palmetto FC Bantams
- * Club domestic league appearances and goals

Eugene Van Taylor is an American retired soccer goalkeeper who spent two seasons in the North American Soccer League, three in the American Soccer League and five in the Major Indoor Soccer League. He retired in 2015 after thirty years as the head coach of the men's soccer program at Lander University.

Van Taylor graduated from West Essex High School where he was a Parade Magazine High School All American soccer player. He attended Erskine College where he was a 1973 Honorable Mention (third team) All American soccer player. He graduated in 1975 with a bachelor's degree in health and physical education. In 1982, he was inducted into the Erskine College Athletic Hall of Fame. He is ranked fourth on the NAIA single-game saves list.

In 1975, the New York Cosmos of the North American Soccer League selected Van Taylor in the first round of the NASL draft, but he never made the first team. The Cosmos traded him to the Miami Toros in 1976 where he was Runner-Up for NASL 'Rookie of the Year'. In 1977, he played for the Fort Lauderdale Strikers as Gordon Banks' backup before moving to the New York Eagles of the American Soccer League in 1978. In 1979 and 1980, he played of the Columbus Magic. In the fall of 1980, Van Taylor signed with the expansion Baltimore Blast of the Major Indoor Soccer League. He played six games then was traded to the Phoenix Inferno. He remained with the Inferno through the 1983–1984 season when the team was known as the Phoenix Pride.

In 1985, he was hired as the head coach of the Lander Bearcats men's soccer team where he amassed over 350 wins and retired in 2015 as one of the winningest coaches in NCAA Division II history. He is also former manager of Premier Development League outfit, Palmetto FC Bantams.
