= Toby Sims =

English footballer (born 1997)

Personal information
- Date of birth: 15 October 1997 (age 29)
- Place of birth: Worksop, England
- Height: 1.85 m (6 ft 1 in)
- Position: Defender

Team information
- Current team: Greenville Triumph
- Number: 4

College career
Years	Team	Apps	(Gls)
2017–2021	Chowan Hawks	64	(16)

Senior career*
Years	Team	Apps	(Gls)
2016–2017	Mickleover Sports		
2018–2019	Greenville FC	23	(1)
2021	South Carolina United	13	(2)
2022	Pittsburgh Riverhounds	15	(1)
2023–2025	Harrogate Town	66	(3)
2025–	Greenville Triumph	22	(2)
- * Club domestic league appearances and goals as of 18:55, 31 October 2026 (UTC)

Toby Sims (born 15 October 1997) is an English professional footballer who plays as a defender for Greenville Triumph.

== Career ==
=== Early career ===
Sims played with Northern Premier League side Mickleover Sports during their 2016–2017 season.

In 2017, Sims attended Chowan University to play college soccer. From 2017 to 2021, with the 2020 season cancelled due to the COVID-19 pandemic, Sims made 64 appearances for the Hawks, scoring 16 goals and tallying 6 assists. Sims earned numerous accolades at Chowan, including being named Conference Carolinas Second Team, two-time NCCSIA All-State First Team, four-time Conference Carolinas First Team, D2CCA All-Region Second Team, D2CCA All-Region First Team, D2CCA Third Team All-American, D2CCA All-Southeast Region First Team, and three-time Conference Carolinas Defensive Player of the Year.

Whilst at college, Sims also played in the NPSL with Greenville FC during their 2018 and 2019 seasons. He also played in the USL League Two in 2021, making 15 appearances for South Carolina United on their way to the Deep South Division title, and been named 2021 League Two Defender of the Year.

=== Professional ===
On 25 February 2022, Sims signed with USL Championship club Pittsburgh Riverhounds. He made his professional debut on 12 March 2022, appearing as a 68th–minute substitute during a 3–0 win over Memphis 901.

=== Harrogate Town ===
On 5 January 2023, Sims returned to his native England when he joined League Two club Harrogate Town on a six-month contract following a successful trial period.

On 6 April 2023, Sims signed a two-year contract extension with Harrogate Town.

Following the conclusion of the 2024–25 season, Sims departed the club to allow him to continue his career abroad, his contract being terminated one month early to allow him to pursue a new opportunity.

On 23 May 2025, Sims returned to the US to sign for USL League One side Greenville Triumph.
