= Pathfinder FC =

American soccer team

- Full name: Pathfinder Football Club New York
- Nicknames: Los Lobos, Wolves
- Founded: 2013
- Stadium: Pathfinder Academy Field
- Capacity: Unknown
- Owner: Colin McComb
- Head Coach: Kevin Longacre
- League: USL League Two
- 2024: 7th, Northeast Division; Playoffs: DNQ
- Website: https://www.pathfinderfc.com/
Home colors	Away colors

Pathfinder FC (formerly FC Málaga City New York) is a soccer club from Dutchess County, New York competing in the Northeast Division of USL League Two.

== History ==
Founded as part of the Beekman Soccer Club, they operated as a team of the club - BSC Wolves, before launching separately, under their new name (FC Málaga City New York) in 2019.

Former club logo and former Spanish affiliate

The club was affiliated with the FC Málaga City Academy of Spain. Every year, FC Málaga City New York would send its entire academy to Spain to train and compete for three months, and the club's coaches come from their Spanish parent club and all hold UEFA certifications. The team was affiliated with Pathfinder Academy, with its players attending the school.

In August 2021, the club cut ties with its Spanish affiliate amid concerns over playing opportunities for their players and re-branded as Pathfinder FC.

== Year-by-year ==
Year	Level	League	Reg. season	Playoffs	U.S. Open Cup
FC Málaga City New York
2021	4	USL League Two	5th, Northeast	did not qualify	did not qualify
Pathfinder FC
2022	4	USL League Two	9th, Northeast	did not qualify	did not qualify
2023	4	USL League Two	4th, Northeast	did not qualify	did not qualify
2024	4	USL League Two	7th, Northeast	did not qualify	did not qualify

== Former coaches ==
- (Zimbabwe) Samkeliso Paradzai Ncube
