= Marios Andreou =

Cypriot footballer (born 1998)

Personal information
- Date of birth: 26 August 1998 (age 28)
- Place of birth: Limassol, Cyprus
- Height: 1.80 m (5 ft 11 in)
- Position: Midfielder

Team information
- Current team: Portland Timbers U23s

Youth career
- –2017: Apollon Limassol

College career
Years	Team	Apps	(Gls)
2018–2020	Grand Canyon Antelopes	27	(2)

Senior career*
Years	Team	Apps	(Gls)
2017–2018	Apollon Limassol	2	(0)
2017–2018	→ Alki Oroklini (loan)	16	(0)
2021–	Portland Timbers U23s	10	(0)

International career^{‡}
2014	Cyprus U17	3	(0)
2016–2017	Cyprus U19	11	(0)
2017	Cyprus U21	3	(0)
- * Club domestic league appearances and goals as of 18:18, 1 June 2020 (UTC) ‡ National team caps and goals as of 18:18, 7 July 2019 (UTC)

Marios Andreou (Greek: Μάριος Ανδρέου; born 26 August 1998) is a Cypriot footballer who plays as a midfielder. He currently plays for Portland Timbers U23s.

== Club career ==
Andreou made his senior debut for Apollon against Karmiotissa in February 2017, coming on as a substitute for Alex da Silva in a 3–0 victory.

== Career statistics ==
=== Club ===
As of 8 July 2018.

Club	Season	League			Cup		Continental		Other		Total	
Club	Season	Division	Apps	Goals	Apps	Goals	Apps	Goals	Apps	Goals	Apps	Goals
Apollon Limassol	2016–17	Cypriot First Division	2	0	0	0	–		0	0	2	0
Alki Oroklini (loan)	2017–18	Cypriot First Division	16	0	0	0	–		0	0	16	0
Portland Timbers U23s	2021	USL League Two	10	0	0	0	–		0	0	10	0
Career total			28	0	0	0	0	0	0	0	28	0
