= Kings Hammer FC =

Soccer club in Cincinnati, Ohio

Kings Hammer
- Full name: Kings Hammer Football Club
- Founded: 2021; 5 years ago
- Stadium: Corcoran Field
- Capacity: 1,600
- Head Coach: Paul Nicholson
- League: USL League Two
- 2023: 4th, Valley Division; Playoffs: DNQ
- Website: kingshammer.com
Home colors

Kings Hammer Football Club is a pre-professional soccer club that plays in Cincinnati, Ohio and based in Covington, Kentucky competing in the Great Lakes Division in USL League Two.

== History ==
The club was founded in 2013 through the merger of Kings Soccer Academy with Hammer FC, but its roots go back to 1993. They have won a US National Youth championship.

In 2020, they added a U23 team in the Ohio Valley Premier League, winning the league's inaugural season in the Fall of 2020. In 2021, they joined USL League Two, the top amateur division in the United States, while still planning to operate their OVPL team. The next step was to elevate the women's team, which they did in 2022, allowing them to compete in the USL W-League's inaugural season. With both men's and women's now a part of USL, Kings Hammer FC offers the highest level of soccer in Greater Cincinnati, apart from the MLS team FC Cincinnati.

== Year-by-year ==
=== Men's team ===
Year	Division	League	Regular season (W–D-L)	Playoffs	Open Cup
2021	4	USL2	3rd, Great Lakes Division (8–2–4)	Conference Quarterfinals	Ineligible
2022	4	USL2	2nd, Valley Division (10–2–2)	Conference Semifinals	did not qualify
2023	4	USL2	4th, Valley Division (2–5–4)	did not qualify	did not qualify

=== Women's team ===
Year	Division	League	Regular season (W–L–T)	Playoffs
2022	4	USLW	7th, Great Lakes Division (2–3–7)	did not qualify
2023	4	USLW	4th, Valley Division (2–1–7)	did not qualify
2024	4	USLW	2nd, Valley Division (6–2–2)	did not qualify
2025	4	USLW	1st, Valley Division (7–3–0)	Conference Finals

== Notable former players ==
- (United States) Jacob Goodall, Kings Hammer SC – 2021, signed in 2021 by Greenville Triumph SC ( (United States) )
- (South Africa) Rizwaan Dharsey, Kings Hammer SC – 2021, signed in 2021 by Vitória Futebol Clube - Pico ( (Portugal) )
- (United States) Sam Robinson, Kings Hammer SC – 2023, international call-up to Puerto Rico
- (United States) Maouloune Goumballe, Kings Hammer SC – 2023, signed in 2024 by Sporting Kansas City II
- (United States) Anthony Samways, Kings Hammer SC – 2024, signed in 2025 by Sporting Kansas City
- (United States) Travis Smith Jr., Kings Hammer SC – 2024, signed in 2025 by Chicago Fire FC
