= Celery City FC =

- Full name: Celery City Football Club
- Founded: 2015; 11 years ago
- Stadium: Soisson-Rapacz-Clason Field, Kalamazoo, Michigan
- Capacity: 2,200
- Owner: Dave Shufelt
- President: Dave Shufelt
- Manager: Shane Lyons
- League: USL League Two
- 2024: 3es, Great Lakes Division; Playoffs: DNQ
- Website: celerycityfc.com
Home colors

Celery City FC, formerly Kalamazoo FC, is a semi-professional soccer club from Kalamazoo, Michigan, United States. The club competes in USL League Two, the fourth-tier soccer league of the American soccer pyramid. Soisson-Rapacz-Clason Field (also known as Mayor's Riverfront Stadium) serves as the club's home venue. It has a capacity for 2,200 spectators.

== Team history ==
=== 2015 ===
Kalamazoo FC was founded by local businessman Mike Garrett. On December 21, 2015, the club was officially named "Kalamazoo FC" as stated in an email by the team owner. By doing so the club became the sixth and newest member of the NPSL from the state of Michigan.

=== 2016 ===
KZFC played its first official game of its inaugural campaign as the visiting team to AFC Ann Arbor on May 13 in Ann Arbor, Michigan. The match outcome would result in a 2–1 loss to AFC Ann Arbor. The first goal in Kalamazoo FC franchise history came in the thirty-second minute from Midfielder Jose Garcia to put the visiting team ahead 1–0.

The first victory in franchise history took place on May 22 against NPSL powerhouse side Detroit City FC in front of a crowd of 1,585 spectators.

The series with the Michigan Stars was the only series where Kalamazoo FC was able to win both matches and the Ann Arbor series was the only series where KZFC lost both matches, all other series were split with the opponent.

Brandon Bye led team with 5 goals this season and was followed by Jose Garcia and Jay Mcintosh who each tallied 3 goals.

During the end of the season banquet the team gave out awards to Beau Prey who was awarded the Supports Player of the Season who was voted on by season ticket holders. Offensive Player of the Season went to Amadou Cisse and the Defensive Player of the Season was awarded to Lou Plascencia. David Whitaker who was the team captain that season was also voted the Overall Excellence award by the coaching staff based on his defensive and leadership abilities shown during the season.

The team would end the season with a record of 4–6–2 and finish 6th in the Great Lakes Conference.

The 2016 team featured Western Michigan University's Brandon Bye who would go on to be the 8th overall pick in the Major League Soccer SuperDraft to the New England Revolution.

=== 2017 ===
Coach Lumumba Shabazz returned as Head Coach for the 2017 season. Coach Shabazz added Brian Clements to the staff as his first assistant. Assistant Coach Jacob Puente also returned for the 2017 season. Another new edition to the coaching staff was Nick Losiewski.

Kalamazoo FC opened the 2017 season on the road at AFC Ann Arbor and suffered a 2–0 loss to the eventual division winner. Kalamazoo FC also played Ann Arbor for their first home game of the season and once again fell by a score of 2–0.

Kalamazoo FC played two exhibition matches during the 2017 season. One against La Liga Latina and the other against Oakland County FC. La Liga Latina is a member of a predominantly Hispanic League that is considered to be one of the top leagues in Southwest Michigan. Kalamazoo FC would go on to beat them by a score of 4–1. Oakland County FC is an amateur team who is a member of the Premier League of America and Kalamazoo FC would win the match by a score of 3–0.

In the 2017 season Kalamazoo beat two teams both home and away. Those teams were Lansing United and Milwaukee FC. Kalamazoo won the matches against Lansing by the scores of 3–0 and 4–1. Kalamazoo defeated Milwaukee by scores of 3–2 and 2–1.

Kalamazoo FC would end the 2017 campaign with a record of 5–6–3 and finished 5th in the conference. Some end of the season awards went to Fuad "Ade" Adeniyi as the Supporters’ Player of the Season and Offensive Player of the Season. Alex Ruddock took home the award for Defensive Player of the Season and Tommy Clark was given the Overall Excellence Award.

=== 2018 ===
Kalamazoo FC hired Brian Clements as the teams’ head coach for the 2018 NPSL season.

Kalamazoo FC will once again participate in the 2018 Michigan Milk Cup as a Pot 1 team and will face Force FC from Pot 2.

=== 2019 ===
Season review will be published soon.

=== 2020 ===
Kalamazoo FC hired Shane Lyons, Kalamazoo native and Western Michigan University Assistant Coach as the teams’ new head coach for the 2020 NPSL season. Unfortunately due to the global COVID-19 pandemic, the 2020 season was cancelled with plans to return to play in the summer of 2021.

=== 2021 ===
Kalamazoo FC began its first season under new coach Shane Lyons after seeing the 2020 season cancelled due to the global COVID-19 pandemic. Along with a new coaching staff, the 2021 season saw KZFC switch to USL League 2 specifically being placed in the Great Lakes Division of the Central Conference. After a couple pre-season friendlies, the club won their inaugural USL League 2 match versus South Bend Lions 1-0 thanks to a late volley from midfielder Daire O-Riordan. Early season results would send KZFC to the top of the table with outside pressure coming from Cincinnati Kings Hammer and Flint City Bucks. It would take until the ninth match of the season for Kalamazoo FC to succumb to their only defeat of the regular season, falling away to Oakland County FC in a downpour. In the second half of the season, Kalamazoo FC would earn 1-0 victories over fellow top of the table contenders to cement their status as playoff contenders. Offensive efforts led by Cyrus Harmon, Enrique Banuelos and Daire O'Riordan would complement a stout defensive unit an continue the club's rise through the power rankings throughout the summer, earning a spot as high as number 12 in the nation according to USL League 2.

In their final match of the season at Fort Wayne FC, it would take a couple second-half tallies from forward Enrique Banuelos to secure the victory and henceforth the division title. With the result, the club secured the number two seed for the Central Conference Playoffs and would travel south to Mississippi to take on Corpus Christi FC for the club's first ever post-season appearance.

== Team Awards ==
=== 2016 ===
- Offensive Player of the Season – Amadou Case
- Defensive Player of the Season – Lou Plascencia
- Supporters Player of the Season – Beau Prey
- Overall Excellence Award – David Whitaker

=== 2017 ===
- Offensive Player of the Season – Fuad "Ade" Adeniyi
- Defensive Player of the Season – Alex Ruddock
- Supporters Player of the Season – Fuad "Ade" Adeniyi
- Overall Excellence Award – Tommy Clark

=== 2019 ===
- Most Valuable Player of the Season – Lasse Kjeldsen
- Offensive Player of the Season – Giuseppe Vitale
- Defensive Player of the Season – Isaac Walker
- Coach's Player of the Season – Carson Brinks
- Teammate of the Year – Elliott Miller

=== 2021 ===
- Most Valuable Player of the Season – Paul-Florian Efang
- Offensive Player of the Season – Cyrus Harmon
- Defensive Player of the Season – Robbie Baker
- Teammate of the Year Award – Elliott Miller

== Year-by-year ==
=== Men's team ===
Year	Tier	League	Regular season	Playoffs	U.S. Open Cup	Average Attendance
2016	4	NPSL	6th of 7, Midwest-Great Lakes West (4–6–2)	did not qualify	Ineligible	1,200
2017	4	NPSL	5th of 8, Midwest-Great Lakes (5–6–3)	did not qualify	did not qualify	1,000
2018	4	NPSL	5th of 7, Midwest-Great Lakes (4–5–3)	did not qualify	did not qualify	
2019	4	NPSL	4th of 8, Midwest-Great Lakes (6–3–5)	did not qualify	did not qualify	
2020	4	NPSL	Season cancelled due to COVID-19 pandemic			
2021	4	USL League Two	1st of 9, Central-Great Lakes (9–1–4)	Conference Final	did not qualify	
2022	4	USL League Two	1st of 6, Central-Great Lakes (8–2–4)	Conference Quarterfinals	did not qualify	
2023	4	USL League Two	6th of 7, Central-Great Lakes (4–5–3)	did not qualify	did not qualify	
2024	4	USL League Two	3rd of 8, Central-Great Lakes (8–3–3)	did not qualify	did not qualify	
2025	4	USL League Two	7th of 8, Central-Great Lakes (4–2–6)	did not qualify	did not qualify	
2026	4	USL League Two	4th of 8, Central-Great Lakes (6–1–5)	did not qualify	did not qualify	

=== Women's team ===
Year	Tier	League	Regular season	Playoffs
2025	4	USL W League	3rd of 6, Great Lakes (5–1–4)	did not qualify
2026	4	USL W League	5th of 6, Great Lakes (2–1–7)	did not qualify
