= John Clark Stadium =

Athletic facility in Plano, Texas, US

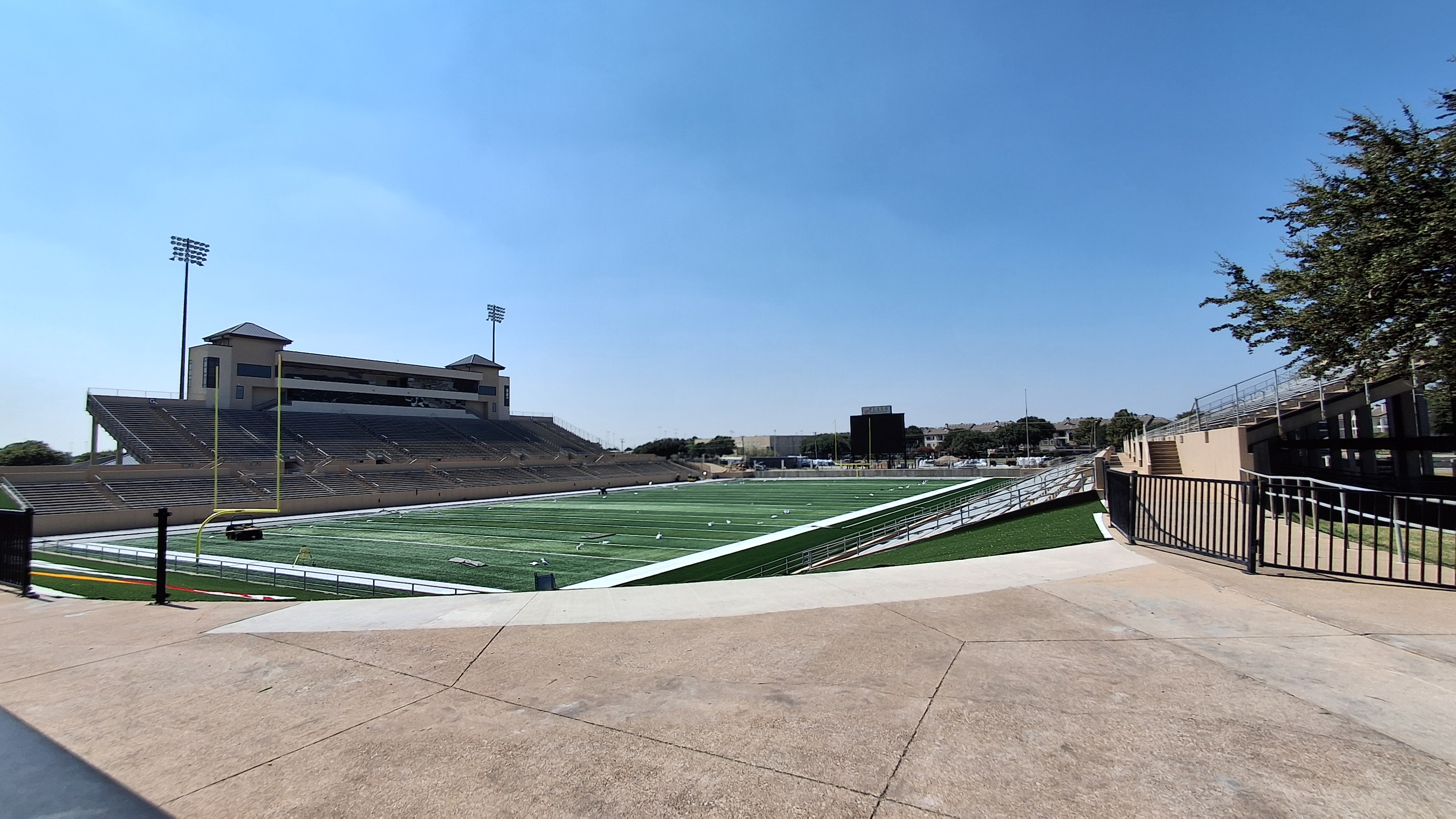
- Interactive map of John Clark Stadium
- Location: Plano, TX
- Owner: Plano ISD
- Capacity: 14,224

Construction
- Built: 1977
- Opened: 1977

Tenants
- Plano Wildcats (UIL) (1977–present); Plano West Wolves (UIL) (1999–present)

Website
- https://athletics.pisd.edu/about-us/athletic-venues/john-clark-stadium

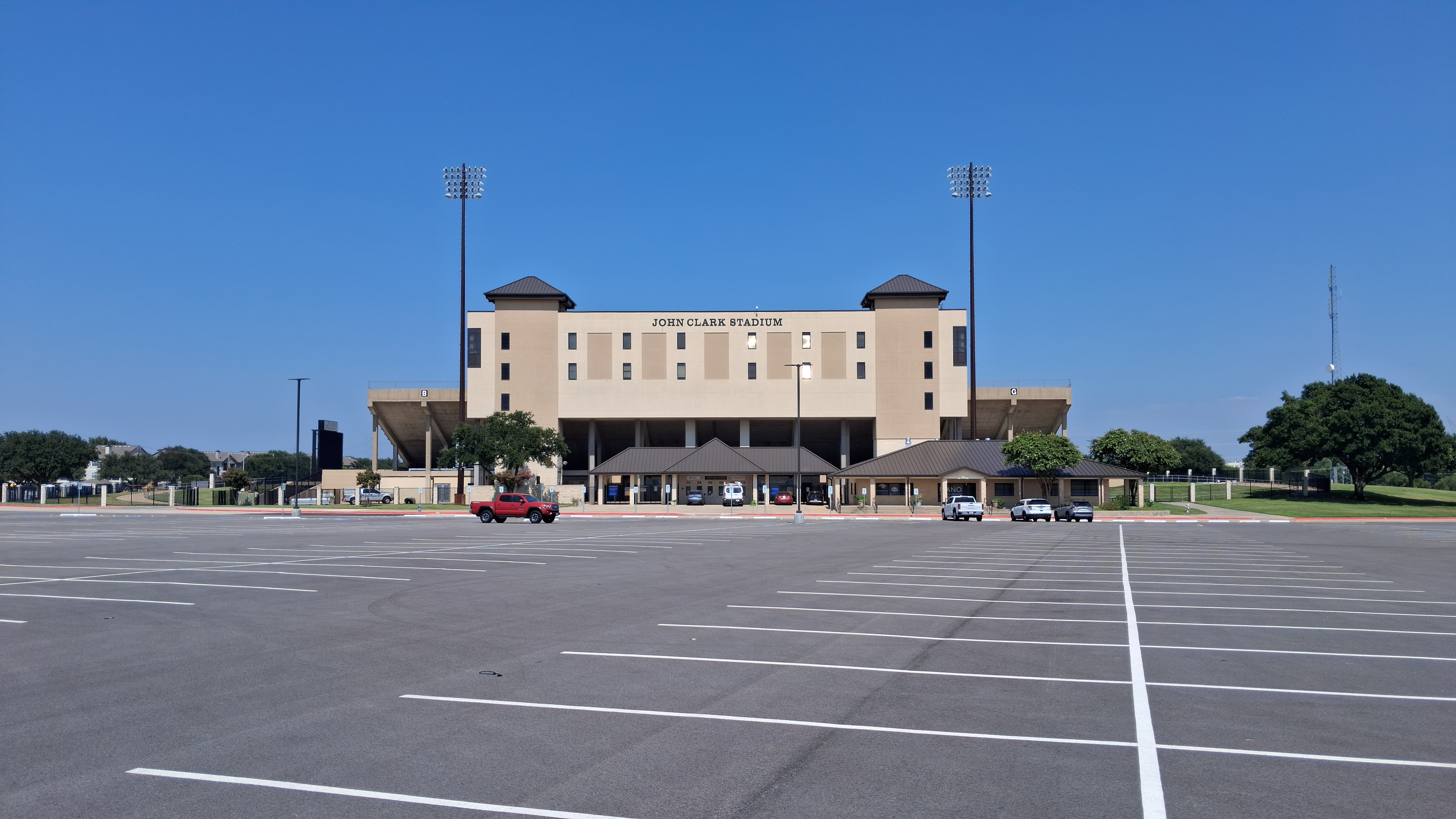
front of the stadium

John Clark Stadium (formerly John Clark Field) is a 14,224-capacity multi-use high school stadium in Plano, Texas. Mostly used for high school football and soccer, the stadium was built in 1977 and is owned by the Plano Independent School District. It is the home stadium of Plano Senior High School and Plano West Senior High School.

== History ==
Named for Coach John Clark, the stadium cost $2.75 million when it was built in 1977.

As of 2019, it was the 19th largest high school stadium in Texas, with a capacity of 14,224.

== Namesake ==
The stadium was named after Coach John Clark, the main coach of Plano High School from Jacksonville. As the main coach of the Plano Wildcats, Clark helped the football team win two state championships and nine district championships. Clark served as the Plano ISD Athletics Director for 17 years. During that time he received many awards including the first inductee into the Plano Athletics Hall of Honor, Texas High School Coaches Association Hall of Honor, the Texas High School Athletic Directors' Hall of Honor and the Texas Sports High School Football Hall of Fame.

== See also ==
- Tom Kimbrough Stadium, home stadium of Plano East Senior High School
