= Lionsbridge FC =

- Full name: Lionsbridge Football Club
- Founded: 2017; 9 years ago
- Stadium: TowneBank Stadium; Newport News, Virginia
- Capacity: 4,200
- Chairman: Mike Vest, Kevin Joyce
- Head coach: Josh Spencer
- League: USL League Two
- 2026: 1st, Chesapeake Division; Playoffs: First Round
- Website: lionsbridgefc.com
Home colors

Lionsbridge Football Club, or Lionsbridge FC, is an American soccer club based in Newport News, Virginia. The club was founded in 2017, and play in USL League Two. The club's colors are blue, black and white, and the club is named for the Lions Bridge, the iconic Peninsula landmark that has stood along the James River and in the Mariners' Museum Park since 1923. The team plays its home games at TowneBank Stadium on the campus of Christopher Newport University.

== History ==
The original founders include Mike Vest, Kevin Joyce, and Dan Chenoweth, all of whom are Virginia Peninsula residents. Lionsbridge FC announced its launch on June 9, 2017, via a social media release. At the time of the team's announcement, the club invited fans to help determine its crest via a fan vote on social media. More than 600 people voted and the team unveiled the winning design in July 2017. The crest integrates four identifying features of the Virginia Peninsula - the Lions Bridge, the team's location and launch year, the James and York Rivers, and the region's importance as a hub of the United States military.

Lionsbridge FC announced its league affiliation (Premier Development League) and TowneBank Stadium (then known as Pomoco Stadium) agreement (with Christopher Newport University) during a press conference on November 14, 2017.

The club named Chris Whalley as its first head coach on February 14, 2018.. He departed the club after the 2026 season. The club appointed Josh Spencer to the post on August 25, 2026.

=== 2018 ===
On May 5, 2018, Lionsbridge FC played their inaugural game against Evergreen FC at the Evergreen Sportsplex, which ended in 1-1 draw, with Jalon Brown scoring the first goal in the club's history. On May 16, 2018, the club played their first home game, securing a 5-1 victory over Evergreen FC, with Max Poelker being the first Lionsbridge player to score at home. Lionsbridge finished their first season in the PDL South Atlantic Division in 3rd place, recording 4 wins, 5 draws, and 5 losses.

=== 2019 ===
In 2019, the PDL was rebranded into USL League Two as Lionsbridge continued to grow in popularity. The club broke a record for single-game attendance on July 3, 2019 against Tri-Cities Otters, drawing a crowd of 3,235, which was the largest attendance in USL League Two in 2019. On July 9, Lionsbridge FC played against a professional team for the first time in their history, losing 0-5 to the Richmond Kickers in a friendly. LBFC finished the 2019 season in 5th place, with 5 wins, 3 draws, and 6 losses.

=== 2020 ===
The 2020 USL League Two season was canceled due to the COVID-19 pandemic. Lionsbridge FC, though, was able to stage seven friendly matches against local sides and won each of those games, including a pair of wins against Virginia Beach United. LBFC outscored its opponents, 28-1, in those seven matches.

=== 2021 ===
Lionsbridge FC experienced a marked improvement in the 2021 season. They finished 2nd in the South Atlantic Division, qualifying for the playoffs for the first time in the club's history. Attendance also continued to rise, with a new record set on July 3, 2021, when 3,417 people watched a 6-0 victory against Tobacco Road FC. Lionsbridge FC was eliminated in the Southern Conference Playoffs Quarterfinal with a 0-2 loss against Tormenta FC 2.

=== 2022 ===
For the 2022 season, USL League Two underwent a restructuring, and Lionsbridge FC was placed in the Chesapeake Division. This season proved to be their most successful yet, as they went undefeated in the league and won the Chesapeake Division title, the first league title in the club's history. Their season record of 12 wins and 2 draws also meant they were crowned the USL League Two Regular Season title. The attendance record was once again broken on July 3, 2022, when 3,547 people came out to watch Lionsbridge FC defeat Virginia Beach United in the Coastal Virginia Challenge Cup.

=== 2023 ===
In 2023, Lionsbridge FC successfully defended their Chesapeake Division title and also won the Eastern Conference title for the first time in the clubs history. They reached the USL League Two National Final but lost 1-2 to Ballard FC, with the decisive goal coming from a last-minute free kick by Peter Kingston.

=== 2024 ===
In 2024, Lionsbridge FC captured their third consecutive Chesapeake Division title with a dominant regular season performance, posting a 9–2–1 record. They advanced through the USL League Two playoffs, reaching the Eastern Conference Final for the second year in a row. Despite a strong campaign, they were eliminated by the Seacoast United Phantoms in a 3–6 loss.

=== 2025 ===
The 2025 season saw Lionsbridge FC miss out on the Chesapeake Division title for the first time since 2021, finishing second behind Northern Virginia FC. It was also the first time in club history that they failed to win the Coastal Virginia Challenge Cup, falling 1-2 at home to Virginia Beach United. Despite the setbacks, Lionsbridge recorded their largest ever league win on June 4, with a 2-11 away victory over Virginia Marauders FC, and achieved their highest goal difference in a season at +37. They secured playoffs on the final matchday with a 7-0 win over Patuxent FC. In the Playoffs, Lionsbridge lost in the Conference Final for a second year in a row to eventual winners Vermont Green.

=== 2026 ===
Lionsbridge FC completed the 2026 season with a 14-3-1 overall record, won its fourth Chesapeake Division championship in five years and reclaimed the Coastal Virginia Challenge Cup. The season ended July 17 with a 3-2 extra-time loss to Asheville City SC in the USL League Two Eastern Conference quarterfinals. Asheville scored in the 122nd minute to eliminate Lionsbridge, who had home-field advantage in the playoffs for a sixth straight year. It was Lionsbridge's fourth first round postseason exit in seven seasons.

== Players and staff ==
=== Current staff ===
- (England) Josh Spencer – Head Coach
- (United States) Jamie Gunderson – Assistant Coach
- (England) Matthew Caley – Assistant Coach
- (United States) Fernando Zuniga – Assistant Coach
- (England) Rich Dearle – Goalkeeping Coach

=== Notable former players ===
This list contains former players who went on to play professionally after they left the club.

- 2018 (England) Tom Devitt – Gateshead FC, Blythe United, Stranraer FC, Hebburn Town
- 2018 (England) Josh Spencer – Hinckley A.F.C.
- 2018 (United States) Joe Rice – Richmond Kickers, New England Revolution II, Loudoun United FC, Detroit City FC.
- 2018 (Spain) Fortia Munts – Valentine Eleebana Phoenix (Australia), Unio Esportiva Vic
- 2018, 2020-21 (United States) Simon Fitch – Richmond Kickers
- 2018, 2020-21 (United States) Adrian Rebollar - Monterey Bay FC
- 2019 (United States) JP Scearce – Union Omaha, Phoenix Rising FC
- 2019 (New Zealand) Oscar Ramsay – Charlotte Independence, North Shore United
- 2019 (England) Luke Brown – Hitchin Town FC, Stowmarket Town FC
- 2019 (United States) Rene White – Real Salt Lake
- 2019 (France) Thibaut Jacquel – FC Dallas, CS Fola Esch
- 2019 (United States) Emeka Eneli - Real Salt Lake
- 2020 (United States) Alex Touche – New Mexico United, Union Omaha
- 2021 (England) Matthew Bentley – Minnesota United, Dover Athletic, Richmond Kickers
- 2021 (England) Peter Dearle - Alfreton Town
- 2022 (United States) Kisa Kiingi – Minnesota United
- 2022-25 (Italy) Davide Materazzi - New York Cosmos
- 2023 (England) Matty Cornish – Darlington FC
- 2024 (France) Claudel N'Goubou - Forward Madison
- 2024 (United States) Jasper Winslow - Tacoma Defiance
- 2024-25 (United States) Denis Krioutchenkov – One Knoxville SC
- 2025 (United States) Donovan Williams - One Knoxville SC
- 2025 (United States) Mitch Budler – Pittsburgh Riverhounds
- 2025 (United States) Taig Healy – Fort Wayne FC
- 2025 (United States) Damean Dominguez – San Juan FC
- 2025 (Spain) Javi Sanchez – FK Jerv
- 2025 (Germany) Felix Ewald – Real Monarchs
- 2025 (United States) Ricky Louis – FC Dallas
- 2026 (Portugal) Rai Pinto – Bayside Argonauts

=== Head coaches ===
- (England) Chris Whalley – (2018–26)
- (England) Josh Spencer – (2027-current)

== Year by year ==
Year	League	Conference	Division	Pld	W	D	L	Pos	Playoffs	U.S. Open Cup	Top Goalscorer(s)
2018	PDL	Eastern	South Atlantic	14	4	5	5	3rd	did not qualify	did not qualify	(United States) Jalon Brown
2019	USL League Two	Eastern	South Atlantic	14	5	3	6	5th	did not qualify	did not qualify	(France) Thibaut Jacquel
2020	USL League Two	Southern	South Atlantic	League season cancelled due to the COVID-19 pandemic. Played seven friendlies: 7 wins, 0 draws, 0 losses.							
2021	USL League Two	Southern	South Atlantic	14	9	2	3	2nd	Conference Quarterfinals	did not qualify	(United States) Charles Touche
2022	USL League Two	Eastern	Chesapeake	14	12	2	0	1st	Conference Quarterfinals	did not qualify	(England) Sam Hall
2023	USL League Two	Eastern	Chesapeake	12	9	1	2	1st	National Final	1st Round	(England) Sam Hall (United States) Logan Finnegan
2024	USL League Two	Eastern	Chesapeake	12	9	2	1	1st	Conference Final	did not qualify	(England) Sam Hall
2025	USL League Two	Eastern	Chesapeake	14	9	3	2	2nd	Conference Final	did not qualify	(England) Evan Howard
2026	USL League Two	Eastern	Chesapeake	14	11	1	2	1st	Conference Quarterfinals	did not qualify	(Colombia) Santiago Hoyos Lopez

== Supporters ==
The club’s official supporters group, known as The Defenders of the Bridge, occupies the supporters section, 'The Lions Den.' In addition to their singing and chanting, the Defenders are known for waving flags and setting off smoke during matches. They also frequently travel to away games and are actively involved in community service.

Lionsbridge FC has consistently led its conference in attendance for each of its six seasons. Among over 100 USL League Two clubs, Lionsbridge ranked 4th nationally in attendance in 2018, 3rd in 2019, 3rd in 2021, and 2nd in 2022.

== Records ==
=== Most appearances ===
Rank	Player	Years	Total
1	(England) Sam Hall	2022–2026	79
2	(England) Christian Hatley	2023–2026	73
3	(England) Josh Baker	2023–2026	62
4	(Italy) Davide Materazzi	2022–2025	56
5	(England) Andrew Bennett	2022–2023, 2025	53

=== Most goals ===
Rank	Player	Years	Total
1	(England) Sam Hall	2022 - 2026	32
2	(England) Christian Hatley	2023 - 2026	24
3	(United States) Charles Touche	2022 - 2023	18
4	(United States) Travis Cooke	2018 - 2020	17
5	(Israel) Denis Krioutchenkov	2024 - 2025	16

== Honors ==
League

- USL League Two
  - Runners Up (1): 2023
- USL League Two Eastern Conference
  - Champions (1): 2023
  - Runners Up (1): 2024, 2025
- USL League Two Chesapeake Division
  - Champions (4): 2022, 2023, 2024, 2026
  - Runners Up (1): 2025

Cup

- Coastal Virginia Challenge Cup
  - Champions (6): 2019, 2020, 2021, 2022, 2023, 2024, 2026

Awards

- USL League Two Franchise of the Year: 2019
- USL League Two Eastern Conference Attendance Leaders: 2018, 2022, 2024
- USL League Two Southern Conference Attendance Leaders: 2019, 2020, 2021

== Jersey sponsors ==
Period	Kit manufacturer	Shirt sponsor
2018–19	Nike	Chick-fil-A
2020–22	Errea	Chick-fil-A
2023–26	Errea	Food Lion
2027–present	hummel	Food Lion

Lionsbridge FC's inaugural season sponsors included Chick-fil-A (Official Jersey Sponsor), Riverside Health System (Official Sports Medicine Provider), Planet Fitness (Official Health Club), Nike (Official Apparel Supplier) and Financial Security Group.
