= Mason Duval =

Caymanian footballer

Personal information
- Date of birth: 24 August 2001 (age 25)
- Place of birth: George Town, Cayman Islands
- Height: 1.77 m (5 ft 10 in)
- Position: Forward

College career
Years	Team	Apps	(Gls)
2019–2022	Elon Phoenix	44	(7)
2023	Jacksonville Dolphins	17	(3)

Senior career*
Years	Team	Apps	(Gls)
2021–2022	North Carolina Fusion U23	20	(17)

International career^{‡}
2018	Cayman Islands U20	4	(1)
2019–	Cayman Islands	11	(1)
- * Club domestic league appearances and goals as of 6 September 2024 ‡ National team caps and goals as of 7 September 2024

Mason Duval (born 24 August 2001) is a Caymanian footballer who plays for the Cayman Islands national team.

== Club career ==
For the 2021 season, Duval joined North Carolina Fusion U23 of the USL League Two. That year, the team advanced to the league final before falling to the Des Moines Menace 0–1. During the regular season, Duval scored eight goals in eight matches.

== Career statistics ==
=== International ===
As of match played 7 September 2024.

National team	Year	Apps	Goals
Cayman Islands	2019	3	0
Cayman Islands	2021	4	0
Cayman Islands	2023	1	0
Cayman Islands	2024	3	1
Total		11	1
