= Daniel Oliveira =

Daniel Oliveira may refer to:

- Daniel Oliveira (rally driver) (born 1985), Brazilian rally driver
- Daniel Oliveira (footballer, born 1985), Brazilian football forward
- Daniel Oliveira (footballer, born 1999), Brazilian football defensive midfielder

== See also ==
- Daniel de Oliveira (disambiguation)
