= James Thomas (footballer, born 1997) =

English footballer (born 1997)

Personal information
- Date of birth: 5 June 1997 (age 29)
- Place of birth: Woking, England
- Height: 5 ft 9 in (1.75 m)
- Position: Defender

College career
Years	Team	Apps	(Gls)
2016–2018	Young Harris Mountain Lions	50	(0)
2019	New Hampshire Wildcats	17	(0)

Senior career*
Years	Team	Apps	(Gls)
2015–2016	Farnham Town		
2017	Peachtree City MOBA	12	(0)
2019–2021	Des Moines Menace	18	(4)
2022–2025	One Knoxville	44	(0)
- * Club domestic league appearances and goals as of 20:11, 1 November 2025 (UTC)

James Thomas (born 5 June 1997) is a former English professional footballer who is now an assistant coach for One Knoxville in USL League One.

== Career ==
=== Early career and college ===
Thomas played with non-league side Farnham Town from 2015, until receiving a scholarship to play college soccer in the United States in the summer of 2016. In 2016, he arrived at Young Harris College, going on to make 50 appearances for the Mountain Lions over three seasons. He finished with eleven assists to his name and was named All-Peach Belt Conference second team in 2018. In 2019, Thomas transferred to the University of New Hampshire. He played one final season of college soccer with the Wildcats, making 17 appearances.

During his 2017 season, Thomas also appeared in the USL PDL with Peachtree City MOBA.

Following college, Thomas remained in the PDL, now named USL League Two, with spells at Des Moines Menace between 2019 and 2021. In 2021, he helped lead the club to winning the title.

2022 saw Thomas remain in USL League Two with new side One Knoxville ahead of their planned expansion to the USL League One in 2023. He made ten appearances for the club in 2022.

=== Professional ===
On 27 January 2023, Thomas was signed to One Knox's USL League One roster. He made his professional debut on 18 March 2023, starting in a 2–1 win over Lexington SC.

== Honors ==
=== Club ===
Des Moines Menace

- USL League Two: 2021
