= East Atlanta FC =

American soccer team

- Full name: East Atlanta Football Club
- Founded: 2020; 6 years ago
- Stadium: Friends Field
- Executive Director: Kelly Shirah
- Head Coach: Sam Walker
- League: USL League Two
- 2023: 3rd, South Central Division; Playoffs: DNQ
- Website: eastatlantafc.com
Home colors	Away colors

East Atlanta Football Club is a soccer club from Atlanta, Georgia competing in the South Central Division of USL League Two.

== History ==
They were set to begin play in the 2020 USL League Two season, however, the season was canceled due to the COVID-19 pandemic.

In 2023, the club was rebranded to East Atlanta Dutch Lions FC as transferred ownership to Dutch businessman Patrick Vierhout.

In 2024, the club's reverted to East Atlanta FC following the removal of Patrick Vierhout due to controversies.

In April 2025, the club's partnered with local Atlanta youth soccer powerhouse GSA.

== Year-by-year ==
Year	Level	League	Reg. season	Playoffs	U.S. Open Cup
East Atlanta FC
2020	4	USL League Two	Season canceled due to COVID-19 pandemic		
2021	4	USL League Two	3rd, Deep South	Conference Quarterfinals	did not qualify
2022	4	USL League Two	10th, Deep South	did not qualify	did not qualify
East Atlanta Dutch Lions FC
2023	4	USL League Two	3rd, South Central	did not qualify	did not qualify
2024	4	USL League Two	5th, South Central	did not qualify	did not qualify
2025	4	USL League Two	8th South Central	did not qualify	did not qualify
2026	4	USL League Two	6th, South Central	did not qualify	did not qualify
