= Carter Johnson =

Canadian classical pianist (born 1996)

- Born: September 25, 1996 (age 30); Campbell River, British Columbia, Canada
- Genres: classical music; contemporary
- Years active: 2018–present
- Website: carterjohnsonpianist.com

Carter Johnson is a Canadian classical pianist. He was the Silver Laureate at the 2025 Honens International Piano Competition. He has won first prizes in piano competitions in Canada, the U.S., and Europe, including first prize at the Dublin International Piano Competition in 2025, and was the first Canadian to reach the final round of the Van Cliburn International Piano Competition in the same year. Johnson performs around the world and is known for providing onstage commentary at his concerts.

== Early life and education ==
Johnson was born in Campbell River on Vancouver Island in British Columbia, Canada. He began piano studies at age five with Shelley Roberts, with whom he continued to study until he was 17. For eight years he gained experience in competitions in both piano and speech arts at a Vancouver Island festival. As a teenager Johnson also earned ATCL (Associate of Trinity College London) degrees in pedagogy and in speech and drama.

He earned a Bachelor of Music at the University of British Columbia, studying under Mark Anderson. He earned two graduate degrees, a Master in Music from the Juilliard School, where he studied with Matti Raekallio and Joseph Kalichstein, and a Master of Musical Arts at the Yale School of Music, where he studied with Wei-Yi Yang. He is a doctoral candidate at Yale.

== Career ==
In 2018 Johnson won first prize at the Canadian Music Stepping Stone Competition and performed at the winners' concert with Orchestre Métropolitaine conducted by Nicolas Ellis. In 2019 he toured Mexico with Orchestra of the Americas conducted by Carlos Miguel Prieto.

He won first prize at the 2020 Valsesia International Competition. The next year he won first prize at the International Competition of Polish Music, performing two winners' concerts in Poland with the Rzeszów Philharmonic Orchestra conducted by Tomasz Chmiel.

In 2023 after winning first prize at the Concours Hauts-de-France International Piano Competition he performed a winners' concert with the Orchestre de Picardie conducted by Simon Proust in Roubaix, France. In 2024 he was the silver medalist at the Gina Bachauer International Piano Competition.

Johnson performs regularly with Angela Hewitt. At the Trasimeno Music Festival in 2025 he gave two recitals with Hewitt and performed the Bach Double Concerto in C minor with Hewitt and the Orchestra da Camera di Perugia.

In 2025 he also won first prize at the Dublin International Piano Competition, and was the first Canadian finalist at the Van Cliburn International Piano Competition.

== Personal life ==
Carter lives in Connecticut with his wife, Hannah, who is a teacher, and their two sons. In addition to the piano he has studied oboe, voice, harpsichord, and elocution, and worked as a vocal coach.

== Prizes and distinctions ==
| Year | Prize or distinction |
|---|---|
| 2025 | Honens International Piano Competition, Silver Laureate |
| 2025 | Dublin International Piano Competition, First Prize and Chamber Music Prize |
| 2025 | Van Cliburn International Piano Competition, Finalist |
| 2024 | Gina Bachauer Competition, Silver Medal |
| 2024 | Heida Hermanns International Competition, First Prize and Commissioned Work Prize |
| 2023 | Walter Naumburg Competition, Finalist/Honorarium |
| 2023 | Weatherford College International Competition, First Prize |
| 2023 | Concours Hauts-de-France International Piano Competition, First Prize |
| 2021 | International Competition of Polish Music, First Prize |
| 2020 | Valsesia Musica International Competition, First Prize |
| 2018 | Orchestre Symphonique de Montréal Manulife Competition, First Prize and Grand Prize |
| 2018 | Canadian Music Stepping Stone Competition, First Prize |
