= TowneBank Stadium =

Football Stadium in Virginia, USA

Coordinates: 37.064400°N 76.499192°W

- Interactive map of TowneBank Stadium
- Former names: Pomoco Stadium
- Location: Moores Lane; Newport News, VA 23606
- Owner: Christopher Newport University
- Operator: Christopher Newport University
- Capacity: 4,200
- Surface: Bermuda, rye, sand blend

Construction
- Opened: 2001

Tenants
- Christopher Newport Captains football (2001–present); Lionsbridge FC (USL2) (2018–present)

TowneBank Stadium is located in Newport News, Virginia, and has served as the home stadium for Lionsbridge FC of the USL League Two since 2018 and the Christopher Newport Captains football team since their inaugural 2001 season.

The stadium opened in 2001 without the now-present permanent concession stands, restrooms, lights, press box or video board. The concession stands, restrooms and press box were added in 2003. Lights were added in 2011. The 312 square foot video board debuted in 2015.

It was previously known as Pomoco Stadium, until it was renamed in 2019, five years after TowneBank pledged a gift of $1,000,000 in 2014 to support CNU's Comprehensive Campaign.

The stadium has a maximum seating capacity of 4,200, with the largest crowd ever on-hand of 6,135 occurring during the inaugural game against Salisbury University on September 1, 2001. Lionsbridge FC welcomed its 50,000th fan to TowneBank Stadium in 2022.
