= SC United FC =

SC United
- Full name: South Carolina United Football Club
- Nickname: Bantams
- Founded: 2011; 15 years ago (as Palmetto FC Bantams)
- Stadium: Southeastern Freight Lines Soccer Center, Columbia, SC
- Owners: Steve Birnie; Aaron Taylor; Van Taylor
- Head Coach: Nathan Smith
- League: USL League Two
- 2024: 2nd, South Central Division; Playoffs: Conference Qualifying Round
- Website: southcarolinaunitedfc.com
Home colors

South Carolina United Football Club is an American soccer team based in Columbia, South Carolina that plays in USL League Two. The team was affiliated with professional English team Bradford City, and was formerly known as Palmetto FC Bantams and SC United Bantams.

== Players and staff ==
=== Current staff ===
As of March 2020

Position	Name	Nationality
Head coach	Nathan Smith	English
Associate Head Coach	Mike Ertel	American

== Year-by-year ==
=== Men's team ===
Year	Division	League	Regular season	Playoffs	Open Cup
Palmetto FC Bantams
2012	4	USL PDL	6th, South Atlantic	Did not qualify	Did not qualify
SC United Bantams
2013	4	USL PDL	5th, South Atlantic	Did not qualify	Did not qualify
2014	4	USL PDL	5th, South Atlantic	Did not qualify	Did not qualify
2015	4	USL PDL	6th, South Atlantic	Did not qualify	Did not qualify
2016	4	USL PDL	3rd, South Atlantic	Divisional Playoff	Did not qualify
2017	4	USL PDL	5th, South Atlantic	Did not qualify	First round
2018	4	USL PDL	3rd, Deep South	Did not qualify	Did not qualify
2019	4	USL League Two	2nd, Deep South	Conference Semifinals	2020 U.S. Open Cup First round
2020	4	USL League Two	Season cancelled due to COVID-19 pandemic		
2021	4	USL League Two	1st, Deep South	Conference Semifinals	Did not qualify
2022	4	USL League Two	6th, South Central	Did not qualify	Did not qualify
2023	4	USL League Two	2nd, South Central	Conference Quarterfinals	Did not qualify
2024	4	USL League Two	2nd, South Central	Conference Qualifying Round	First round
2025	4	USL League Two	4th, South Central	Did not qualify	Did not qualify
2026	4	USL League Two	5th, South Central	Did not qualify	Did not qualify

=== Women's team ===
Year	Division	League	Regular season	Playoffs
2022	4	USL W League	3rd, South Central	Did not qualify
2023	4	USL W League	6th, South Central	Did not qualify
2024	4	USL W League	6th, South Atlantic	Did not qualify
2025	4	USL W League	2nd, South Atlantic	Did not qualify
2026	4	USL W League	6th, South Atlantic	Did not qualify

== Honors ==
- USL League Two
  - Deep South Division Champions 2021

== Stadiums ==
- Lander University: Jeff May Complex (Greenwood, South Carolina), 2012–
- Stone Stadium (Columbia, South Carolina), 2012–2014
- Southeastern Freight Lines Soccer Center (Columbia, South Carolina) 2018–
