= Chicago FC United =

- Full name: Chicago FC United
- Nickname: FC United
- Founded: 2003
- Ground: Vernon Hills Athletic Complex
- Owner: 3Step Sports
- League: MLS Next, Girls Academy
- Website: www.chicagofcunited.com

Chicago FC United, commonly called FC United, is an American soccer club in the Chicago metropolitan area. FC United fields youth teams for boys and girls, and a semi-professional team in USL League Two, the fourth-tier of American soccer.

== Youth and Academy Programs ==
Chicago FC United, founded in 2003, is an elite youth soccer program located in suburban Chicago. The club also operates Trevians Soccer Club and Chicago Magic. FC United youth teams play in local, regional, and national leagues, and its academy teams are founding members of Girls Academy, and MLS Next.

The primary home field is located at Vernon Hills Athletic Complex. FC United co-invested in 2019 with the Vernon Hills Park District to install synthetic turf on three soccer fields. The club operates tournaments in the Chicago area, under the moniker Soccer Events Group, including the Labor Day weekend Chicago Cup.

Soccer Wire, an online publication that ranks the top youth clubs in America, ranks FC United the #30 boys club as of June 2021, and the #31 girls club as of September 2022. In 2021, the U-19 Boys Pre-Academy Red team won the USYS National Championship.

== USL League Two ==
Chicago FC United
- Founded: 2017
- Stadium: Bridgeview Sports Dome
- Manager: Logan Pause
- League: USL League Two

In 2017, FC United added a semi-professional team in the PDL, now the USL League Two, replacing the departing Chicago Fire Premier, after the Fire decided to relinquish their ties to the PDL.

=== Season Results ===
Year	Division	League	Regular season	Playoffs	Open Cup
2017	4	USL PDL	5th, Heartland	did not qualify	3rd Round
2018	4	USL PDL	2nd, Heartland	National semifinals	did not qualify
2019	4	USL League Two	1st, Great Lakes	Conference semifinals	did not qualify
2020	Season cancelled due to COVID-19 pandemic				
2021	4	USL League Two	2nd, Heartland	Conference quarterfinals	did not qualify
2022	4	USL League Two	1st, Heartland	Conference semifinals	1st Round

=== USL Honors ===
- USL PDL Central Conference Champions 2018
- USL League Two Great Lakes Division Champions 2019
- USL League Two Heartland Division Champions 2022

== Ownership ==
Chicago FC United is owned by 3Step Sports, a nationwide youth sports operator.

FC United was previously owned by SMP Holdings (Sports Made Personal), led by founder and CEO Chad Gruen. SMP also operated Lacrosse America and Team ONE Lacrosse. Team ONE Lacrosse merged with SMP in 2011.

In June 2022, SMP Holdings was acquired by 3Step Sports.
