= 2018 PDL season =

Premier Development League
- Season: 2018
- Champion: Calgary Foothills FC (1st Title)
- Regular Season Champions: Des Moines Menace (3rd Title)
- 2019 Hank Steinbrecher Cup qualifier: Reading United AC
- 2019 U.S. Open Cup qualifiers: Black Rock FC; Brazos Valley Cavalry; Dayton Dutch Lions; Des Moines Menace; FC Golden State Force; SIMA Águilas; Red Bulls U-23; Reading United AC; South Georgia Tormenta; The Villages SC
- Matches: 518
- Goals: 1,797 (3.47 per match)
- Best player: (Japan) Ryosuke Kinoshita Des Moines Menace
- Top goalscorer: (Germany) Marek Weber SC United Bantams (18 Goals)
- Best goalkeeper: (Canada) Marco Carducci Calgary Foothills FC
- Biggest home win: BRV 8, CLB 1 (June 29)
- Biggest away win: DCR 1, MIB 14 (July 10)
- Highest scoring: MIB 14, DCR 1 (July 10)
- Longest winning run: 10 games South Georgia Tormenta (May 19 - July 5)
- Longest unbeaten run: 14 games Des Moines Menace (entire season); Reading United AC (entire season); South Georgia Tormenta (entire season)
- Longest winless run: 14 games Derby City Rovers (entire season); WSA Winnipeg (entire season)
- Longest losing run: 14 games Derby City Rovers (entire season); WSA Winnipeg (entire season)
- All statistics correct as of July 16, 2018.

The 2018 Premier Development League season was the 24th season of the PDL, and the last under the PDL name. The regular season started on May 4 and ended on July 16. There were a total of 74 teams playing across 11 divisions with the addition of the Deep South division. Calgary Foothills FC won the final championship under the PDL branding, having defeated Reading United AC 4–2 in extra time in the Championship game on August 4, 2018.

== Changes from 2017 ==
=== New teams ===
A total of 12 new member clubs join the PDL for the 2018 season.

Team	Country	City/area	Stadium	Founded	Head coach	Notes
AHFC Royals	U.S.	Houston, Texas	Campbell Road Sports Park	2017	Jorge Carrasco	
Birmingham Hammers	U.S.	Vestavia Hills, Alabama	Sicard Hollow Athletic Complex	2013	Wulf Koch	NPSL
Black Rock FC	U.S.	Lakeville, Connecticut	Hotchkiss Athletic Fields	2013		
Colorado Pride Switchbacks U23	U.S.	Colorado Springs, Colorado	Washburn Field & Weidner Field	2018	Diego Zaltron	
Corpus Christi FC	U.S.	Corpus Christi, Texas	Dr. Jack Dugan Family Soccer & Track Stadium	2017	Sammy Giraldo	
Kaw Valley FC	U.S.	Topeka, Kansas	Hummer Sports Complex	2017	István Urbányi	
Lansing United	U.S.	East Lansing, Michigan	Archer Stadium	2014	Nate Miller	NPSL
Lionsbridge FC	U.S.	Newport News, Virginia	Pomoco Stadium	2017	Chris Whalley	
Memphis City FC	U.S.	Memphis, Tennessee	Christian Brothers University	2015	Mark Franklin	NPSL
Ogden City SC	U.S.	Ogden, Utah	Spence Eccles Ogden Community Sports Complex	2017	Eric Landon	
San Francisco Glens SC	U.S.	San Francisco, California	Boxer Stadium	1961	Javier Ayala-Hil	
Santa Cruz Breakers FC	U.S.	Aptos, California	Cabrillo College Stadium, Aptos High School, & Monterey Peninsula College	1992		

=== Name changes ===
- Palm Beach Suns FC became Next Academy Palm Beach
- Fresno Fuego became Fresno FC U-23
- South Florida Surf became North County United

=== Folded ===
- Burlingame Dragons FC
- BYU Cougars
- FC Boulder U23
- Jersey Express S.C.
- K-W United FC
- Nashville SC U23
- Saint Louis FC U23
- SoCal Surf
- Tampa Bay Rowdies U-23
- Wilmington Hammerheads

== Standings ==
=== Eastern Conference ===
==== Mid Atlantic Division ====
Pos	Team	Pld	W	L	T	GF	GA	GD	Pts	Qualification
1	Reading United AC	14	12	0	2	33	8	+25	38	Advance to the Eastern Conference Championship
2	New York Red Bulls U-23	14	10	3	1	45	17	+28	31	Advance to the Eastern Conference Championship
3	Long Island Rough Riders	14	9	4	1	26	16	+10	28	
4	Ocean City Nor'easters	14	9	5	0	27	20	+7	27	
5	F.A. Euro	14	3	11	0	10	33	−23	9	
6	Evergreen FC	14	1	11	2	16	42	−26	5	
7	Lehigh Valley United	14	1	12	1	10	35	−25	4	

Source: Premier Development League
Rules for classification: Tiebreakers

==== Northeast Division ====
Pos	Team	Pld	W	L	T	GF	GA	GD	Pts	Qualification
1	Black Rock FC	14	9	2	3	33	19	+14	30	Advance to the Eastern Conference Championship
2	GPS Portland Phoenix	14	7	4	3	28	21	+7	24	
3	Western Mass Pioneers	14	6	4	4	22	18	+4	22	
4	FC Boston	14	5	6	3	23	25	−2	18	
5	AC Connecticut	14	5	7	2	20	33	−13	17	
6	Westchester Flames	14	2	5	7	17	23	−6	13	
7	Seacoast United Phantoms	14	2	8	4	17	21	−4	10	

Source: Premier Development League
Rules for classification: Tiebreakers

==== South Atlantic Division ====
Pos	Team	Pld	W	L	T	GF	GA	GD	Pts	Qualification
1	Myrtle Beach Mutiny	14	8	2	4	40	19	+21	28	Advance to the Eastern Conference Championship
2	North Carolina FC U23	14	6	3	5	24	18	+6	23	
3	Lionsbridge FC	14	4	5	5	23	20	+3	17	
4	Charlotte Eagles	14	3	7	4	22	30	−8	13	
5	Tobacco Road FC	14	3	7	4	18	30	−12	13	
6	Carolina Dynamo	14	2	7	5	19	39	−20	11	

Source: Premier Development League
Rules for classification: Tiebreakers

=== Western Conference ===
==== Northwest Division ====
Pos	Team	Pld	W	L	T	GF	GA	GD	Pts	Qualification
1	Calgary Foothills FC	14	11	1	2	30	7	+23	35	Advance to the Western Conference Championship
2	Seattle Sounders FC U-23	14	6	5	3	26	21	+5	21	
3	Lane United FC	14	5	4	5	28	22	+6	20	
4	TSS FC Rovers (J)	14	5	7	2	19	27	−8	17	
5	Victoria Highlanders	14	5	9	0	14	25	−11	15	
6	Portland Timbers U23	14	3	9	2	15	30	−15	11	

Source: Premier Development League
Rules for classification: Tiebreakers
(J) Juan de Fuca Plate

==== Mountain Division ====
Pos	Team	Pld	W	L	T	GF	GA	GD	Pts	Qualification
1	Colorado Rapids U-23	14	8	2	4	42	23	+19	28	Advance to the Western Conference Championship
2	FC Tucson	14	7	3	4	29	19	+10	25	Advance to the Western Conference Championship
3	Albuquerque Sol FC	14	4	6	4	25	38	−13	16	
4	Colorado Pride Switchbacks U23	14	4	7	3	26	28	−2	15	
5	Ogden City SC	14	3	8	3	16	30	−14	12	

Source: Premier Development League
Rules for classification: Tiebreakers

==== Southwest Division ====
Pos	Team	Pld	W	L	T	GF	GA	GD	Pts	Qualification
1	FC Golden State Force	14	12	1	1	38	10	+28	37	Advance to the Western Conference Championship
2	Ventura County Fusion	14	7	6	1	18	16	+2	22	
3	Orange County SC U-23	14	6	5	3	16	14	+2	21	
4	Santa Cruz Breakers FC	14	6	6	2	19	19	0	20	
5	Fresno FC U-23	14	6	6	2	23	24	−1	20	
6	San Francisco City FC	14	5	8	1	16	24	−8	16	
7	San Francisco Glens SC	14	4	6	4	16	17	−1	16	
8	San Diego Zest FC	14	3	6	5	15	29	−14	14	
9	Southern California Seahorses	14	4	9	1	18	26	−8	13	

Source: Premier Development League
Rules for classification: Tiebreakers

=== Central Conference ===
==== Great Lakes Division ====
Pos	Team	Pld	W	L	T	GF	GA	GD	Pts	Qualification
1	Dayton Dutch Lions	14	8	3	3	29	15	+14	27	Advance to the Central Conference Championship
2	Lansing United	14	7	2	5	27	12	+15	26	Advance to the Central Conference Championship
3	Cincinnati Dutch Lions	14	6	4	4	24	17	+7	22	
4	Michigan Bucks	14	6	4	4	42	18	+24	22	
5	West Virginia Chaos	14	3	5	6	25	29	−4	15	
6	Derby City Rovers	14	0	13	1	8	65	−57	1	

Source: Premier Development League
Rules for classification: Tiebreakers

==== Heartland Division ====
Pos	Team	Pld	W	L	T	GF	GA	GD	Pts	Qualification
1	Des Moines Menace (R)	14	13	0	1	37	6	+31	40	Advance to the Central Conference Championship
2	Chicago FC United	14	7	5	2	23	20	+3	23	Advance to the Central Conference Championship
3	Kaw Valley FC	14	6	6	2	21	23	−2	20	
4	St. Louis Lions	14	6	6	2	26	24	+2	20	
5	Thunder Bay Chill	14	6	7	1	21	20	+1	19	
6	WSA Winnipeg	14	0	14	0	10	46	−36	0	

Source: Premier Development League
Rules for classification: Tiebreakers
(R) Regular Season Champions

=== Southern Conference ===
==== Deep South Division ====
Pos	Team	Pld	W	L	T	GF	GA	GD	Pts	Qualification
1	South Georgia Tormenta FC	14	11	0	3	30	10	+20	36	Advance to the Southern Conference Championship
2	Mississippi Brilla	14	8	2	4	31	18	+13	28	
3	SC United Bantams	14	7	4	3	35	22	+13	24	
4	Birmingham Hammers	14	5	5	4	25	28	−3	19	
5	Tri-Cities Otters	14	5	7	2	30	28	+2	17	
6	Peachtree City MOBA	14	4	6	4	25	33	−8	16	
7	Memphis City FC	14	1	10	3	16	38	−22	6	

Source: Premier Development League
Rules for classification: Tiebreakers

==== Mid South Division ====
Pos	Team	Pld	W	L	T	GF	GA	GD	Pts	Qualification
1	Brazos Valley Cavalry FC	14	9	2	3	42	19	+23	30	Advance to the Southern Conference Championship
2	OKC Energy U23	14	9	4	1	37	22	+15	28	
3	AHFC Royals	14	7	7	0	29	29	0	21	
4	Corpus Christi FC	14	6	6	2	32	32	0	20	
5	Texas United	14	5	6	3	32	32	0	18	
6	FC Cleburne	14	4	9	1	20	42	−22	13	
7	Houston FC	14	2	8	4	16	31	−15	10	

Source: Premier Development League
Rules for classification: Tiebreakers

==== Southeast Division ====
Pos	Team	Pld	W	L	T	GF	GA	GD	Pts	Qualification
1	SIMA Águilas	14	10	2	2	23	6	+17	32	Advance to the Southern Conference Championship
2	The Villages SC	14	9	2	3	31	8	+23	30	Advance to the Southern Conference Championship
3	Lakeland Tropics	14	9	2	3	29	13	+16	30	
4	IMG Academy Bradenton	14	6	6	2	24	30	−6	20	
5	FC Miami City	14	5	8	1	25	36	−11	16	
6	Weston FC	14	4	9	1	19	31	−12	13	
7	Next Academy Palm Beach	14	4	10	0	18	25	−7	12	
8	North County United	14	2	10	2	13	33	−20	8	

Source: Premier Development League
Rules for classification: Tiebreakers

== Playoffs ==
Conference Semifinals
DS	Tormenta FC	0
**WC**	**The Villages SC**	**1**
**Southern Conference**
**SE**	**SIMA Aguilas**	**2**
MS	Brazos Valley Cavalry F.C.	1
**MA**	**Reading United AC**	**4**
SA	Myrtle Beach Mutiny	3
**Eastern Conference**
NE	Black Rock FC	1
**WC**	**New York Red Bulls U-23**	**2**
SW	FC Golden State Force	2(1)
**WC**	**FC Tucson**	**2(3)**
**Western Conference**
**NW**	**Calgary Foothills FC**	**1**
MT	Colorado Rapids U-23	0
**HL1**	**Des Moines Menace**	**0(4)**
GL2	Lansing United	0(3)
**Central Conference**
GL1	Dayton Dutch Lions	3
**HL2**	**Chicago FC United**	**5**

Conference Finals
**WC**	**The Villages SC**	**2***
SE	SIMA Aguilas	1
**MA**	**Reading United AC**	**2**
WC	New York Red Bulls U-23	1
WC	FC Tucson	0
**NW**	**Calgary Foothills FC**	**2**
HL1	Des Moines Menace	0
**HL2**	**Chicago FC United**	**1**

National Semifinals
WC	The Villages SC	0
**MA**	**Reading United AC**	**1***
**NW**	**Calgary Foothills FC**	**1**
HL2	Chicago FC United	0

National Championship
MA	Reading United AC	2
**NW**	**Calgary Foothills FC**	**4***

Bold = winner
* = after extra time, ( ) = penalty shootout score

=== Conference Championships ===
The PDL Conference Championships were held over the weekend of July 20–21. Matches were played at: Whittier, CA (Western Conference, host FC Golden State Force); Reading, PA (Eastern Conference, host Reading United AC); Des Moines, IA (Central Conference, host Des Moines Menace); and Statesboro, GA (Southern Conference, host South Georgia Tormenta FC). The four conference champions advanced to the PDL semifinals.

=== Eastern Conference ===
July 20, 2018 Conference Semifinal	**(Massachusetts)** Black Rock FC	**1–2**	**(New Jersey) New York Red Bulls U-23**	Gurski Stadium; West Lawn, Pennsylvania
5:00 PM EDT	Harris 7'; Achara (yellow card)	Report	Gilbey 2'; Zajec 25'; Deeds (yellow card)

July 20, 2018 Conference Semifinal	**(Pennsylvania) Reading United AC**	**4–3**	**(South Carolina)** Myrtle Beach Mutiny	Gurski Stadium; West Lawn, Pennsylvania
7:30 PM EDT	ElMedkhar 27'; Bennett 71', 87'; Roberts 90'	Report	Yamamoto 70'; Piggott 76'; Ibarrondo 90'

July 21, 2018 Conference Final	**(Pennsylvania) Reading United AC**	**2–1**	**(New Jersey)** New York Red Bulls U-23	Gurski Stadium; West Lawn, Pennsylvania
7:00 PM EDT	Bennett 26', 42'; Kahsay (yellow card); Molloy (yellow card)	Report	Coco 61' (yellow card); Kouma (yellow card); Da Silva (yellow card)

=== Southern Conference ===
July 20, 2018 Conference Semifinal	**(Florida) SIMA Aguilas**	**2–1**	**(Texas)** Brazos Valley Cavalry F.C.	Erk Russell Park; Statesboro, Georgia
5:00 PM EDT	Espana 29'; Novaes 35'; Diouf (yellow card); Agu (yellow card); Graydon (yellow card)	Report	Palomino 46'; Paita (yellow card)

July 20, 2018 Conference Semifinal	**(Georgia (U.S. state))** South Georgia Tormenta FC	**0–1**	**(Florida) The Villages SC**	Erk Russell Park; Statesboro, Georgia
8:00 PM EDT	Arche (yellow card); Micaletto (yellow card); Sossou (yellow card)	Report	Antonio 34'; Dos Santos (yellow card); Gyau (yellow card)

July 21, 2018 Conference Final	**(Florida)** SIMA Aguilas	**1–2** (a.e.t.)	**(Florida) The Villages SC**	Erk Russell Park; Statesboro, Georgia
8:00 PM EDT	Gueye 17'; Diouf (yellow card); Graydon (yellow card)	Report	Paiva 21'; Raimundo 104'; Torres (yellow card); Gyau (yellow card)

=== Central Conference ===
July 20, 2018 Conference Semifinal	**(Ohio)** Dayton Dutch Lions	**3–5**	**(Illinois) Chicago FC United**	Valley Stadium; West Des Moines, Iowa
4:30 PM CDT	Robertson 31'; Williams 41'; Dietrich 45'; Koositra (yellow card)	Report	Alfaro 28'; Todd 53'; Prpa 70', 82'; Alba 90'; Gomez (yellow card)

July 20, 2018 Conference Semifinal	**(Iowa) Des Moines Menace**	**0–0** (**4–3** p)	**(Michigan)** Lansing United	Valley Stadium; West Des Moines, Iowa
7:30 PM CDT		Report
	**Penalties**
	Ryosuke (penalty scored); Michaelson (penalty missed); Fenwick (penalty scored); Jepson (penalty scored); Manning (penalty scored)		(penalty scored) Wright; (penalty scored) Carr; (penalty scored) L. Jones; (penalty missed) D. Jones; (penalty missed) Freitag

July 21, 2018 Conference Final	**(Iowa)** Des Moines Menace	**0–1**	**(Illinois) Chicago FC United**	Valley Stadium; West Des Moines, Iowa
7:30 PM CDT	Manning (yellow card); Fricke (yellow card)	Report	Magno 76' (yellow card); Stoneman (yellow card); Todd (yellow card)

=== Western Conference ===
July 20, 2018 Conference Semifinal	**(Alberta) Calgary Foothills FC**	**1–0**	**(Colorado)** Colorado Rapids U23	Rio Hondo College; Whittier, California
4:00 PM PDT	Musse 86'	Report	Bushey (yellow card); Mushagalusa (yellow card)

July 20, 2018 Conference Semifinal	**(California)** FC Golden State Force	**2–2** (a.e.t.) (**1–3** p)	**(Arizona) FC Tucson**	Rio Hondo College; Whittier, California
7:00 PM PDT	Riascos 20' (yellow card); Villalobos 22'; Asiedu (yellow card); Salazar (yellow card); Silva (yellow card)	Report	Heredia 63'; Valenzuela 90'; German (yellow card); Oke (yellow card)

July 21, 2018 Conference Final	**(Alberta) Calgary Foothills FC**	**2–0**	**(Arizona)** FC Tucson	Rio Hondo College; Whittier, California
7:00 PM PDT	Akio 38'; Musse 57'; Waterman (yellow card)	Report

== PDL Championship ==
=== Semifinals ===
July 28, 2018 National Semifinal	(Pennsylvania) Reading United AC	1–0 (a.e.t.)	(Florida) The Villages SC	Gurski Stadium; West Lawn, Pennsylvania
7:00 PM EDT	Zandi (yellow card) 45+1'; Roberts 115'; Waso (yellow card); Conte (yellow card)	Report	Lopes (yellow card); Da Silva (yellow card) 68'; Torres (yellow card); Gyau (red card)

July 28, 2018 National Semifinal	(Alberta) Calgary Foothills FC	1–0	(Illinois) Chicago FC United	Foothills Field; Okotoks, Alberta
7:00 PM MDT	Musse 58'; Adekugbe (yellow card)	Report	Sanchez (yellow card); Stoneman (yellow card); Bruijne (yellow card); Schlenker (yellow card)	Attendance: 1,250

=== Final ===
August 4, 2018 National Final	(Pennsylvania) Reading United AC	2–4 (a.e.t.)	(Alberta) Calgary Foothills FC	Gurski Stadium; West Lawn, Pennsylvania
7:00 PM EDT	Miller (yellow card) 33' (yellow-red card) 80'; Conte (yellow card) 43' (yellow-red card) 88'; Molloy 45'; Kahsay (yellow card) 69'; Roberts 79'	Report 1 Report 2	Musse 12', 120'; Zator 85'; Serban (red card) 90+6'; Pasquotti 119'; Northover (yellow card); Patino (yellow card)	Attendance: 2,278

Championship MVP: (Canada) Nico Pasquotti (CGY)

== Awards ==
- Most Valuable Player: (Japan) Ryosuke Kinoshita (DMM)
- Golden Boot: (Germany) Marek Weber (SCU)
- Young (U21) Player of the Year: (United States) Luka Prpa (CHI)
- Coach of the Year: (Republic of Ireland) Alan McCann, (REA)
- Goalkeeper of the Year: (Canada) Marco Carducci (CGY)
- Defender of the Year: (England) Jordan Skelton (MIS)

=== Weekly Awards ===
Player of the Week
Week	Player	Club	Position	Reason	Ref.
1/2	(Brazil) Pedro Fonseca	FC Golden State Force	Forward	4 goals, 1 assists in 3 wins against San Diego Zest, Orange County SC U23, and San Francisco City FC	
3	(United States) Julio Vargas	Texas United	Forward	4 goals in pair of wins against FC Cleburne and OKC Energy U23	
4	(Japan) Kino Ryosuke	Des Moines Menace	Forward	4 goals in pair of opening wins against WSA Winnipeg and St. Louis Lions	
5	(United States) Tate Robertson	Dayton Dutch Lions	Forward	3 goals, 1 assist in pair of wins	
6	(El Salvador) Gerber Chávez	Mississippi Brilla FC	Forward	4 goals in 3 wins against Memphis City FC, Tri-Cities Otters, and Memphis City FC again	
7	(Panama) Romario Piggott	Myrtle Beach Mutiny	Midfielder	5 goals in 2 wins against Charlotte Eagles and Carolina Dynamo	
8	(Canada) Moses Danto	Calgary Foothills FC	Forward	4 goals, 1 assist in 5-1 win over TSS FC Rovers	
9	(United States) Brandon Guhl	Brazos Valley Cavalry FC	Forward	5 goals, 2 assists in pair of wins over AHFC Royals and FC Cleburne	
10	(United States) Conner Antley	South Georgia Tormenta FC	Defender	took part in 2 shutouts vs Birmingham Hammers and Mississippi Brilla FC	
11	(Canada) Austin Ricci	Michigan Bucks	Forward	5 goals, 6 assists vs Derby City Rovers and West Virginia Chaos	

Goal of the Week
Week	Player	Club	Opponent	Ref.
1/2	(United States) DeJuan Jones	Lansing United	Michigan Bucks	
3	(South Korea) Lee Seong Yeon	San Diego Zest FC	San Francisco City FC	
4	(Algeria) Sami Guediri	SIMA Aguilas	FC Miami City	
5	(Netherlands) Daniël Krutzen	Reading United AC	New York Red Bulls U23	
6	(France) Killian Colombie	AHFC Royals	Houston FC	
7	(Spain) Guillermo Segovia	Tri-Cities Otters	Peachtree City MOBA	
8	(Canada) Austin Ricci	Michigan Bucks	Lansing United	
9	(Haiti) Fredlin Mompremier	Ocean City Nor'easters	FA Euro New York	
10	(Spain) Toni Soler	South Georgia Tormenta FC	Birmingham Hammers	
11	(United States) Elijah Agu	SIMA Aguilas	Next Academy Palm Beach	
Conference Playoffs	(United States) Adrian Valenzuela	FC Tucson	FC Golden State Force	
National Playoffs	(Canada) Dominick Zator	Calgary Foothills FC	Reading United AC	

Save of the Week
1/2	(United States) Joseph Rice	Lionsbridge FC	Lane United FC
3	(Brazil) Giovani Rello	Black Rock FC	Westchester Flames
4	(United States) Zachary Nelson	Portland Timbers U23s	Calgary Foothills FC
5	(Colombia) Federico Barrios	Dayton Dutch Lions	Derby City Rovers
6	(Brazil) Gustavo Vasconcelos	Lakeland Tropics	FC Florida U23
7	(United States) Casey Clark	St. Louis Lions	Chicago FC United
8	(United States) Bobby Edwards	SC United Bantams	Carolina Dynamo
9	(United States) Kevin Peach	San Francisco Glens SC	FC Golden State Force
10	(United States) Joseph Rice	Lionsbridge FC	Carolina Dynamo
11	(United States) Konrad Dziedzic	Peachtree City MOBA	Mississippi Brilla FC
Conference Playoffs	(Netherlands) Ritchie Steinmann	SIMA Aguilas	Brazos Valley Cavalry FC
National Playoffs	(United States) Timothy McGlynn	The Villages SC	Reading United AC

Team of the Week
Week	Goalkeeper	Defenders	Midfielders	Forwards	Honorable Mentions	Ref.
1/2	(Canada) Carducci (CGY)	(Brazil) Carvalho (LAK) (United States) Santana (GSF) (United States) Mendoza (SIM)	(United States) Valenzuela (TUC) (Republic of Ireland) Molloy (REA) (Serbia) Markovic (CRP) (Croatia) Jovanovski (BOS)	(England) Wadda (TBR) (United States) Jones (LNU) (Brazil) Fonseca (GSF)	F - (United States) Colombie (ROY); M - (England) Corfe (OCN); F - (England) Goldsmith (MIB); F - (Colombia) S. Patiño (MIB); GK - (Honduras) Mashburn (WES); GK - (United States) Cretens (TOB); D - (United States) Hernandez (FRE); M - (England) Brock (MIS); F - (United States) Greene (MEM); D - (United States) Seagrist (CHE); F - (United States) Byabusha (WES)	
3	(Brazil) Rello (BLR)	(United States) Freitag (LNU) (England) Touche (ABU) (England) Bryan (MIS)	(United States) Perez (CHI) (United States) Quesada (CRP) (United States) Magaña-Rivera (POR) (England) Ellis (LBR)	(South Africa) Bartman (MYB) (United States) Jones (LNU) (United States) Vargas (TEX)	M - (South Africa) Timm (MYB); D - (United States) Fabian (WMP); M - (England) Henrique (LAK); F - (England) Goldsmith (MIB); F - (Colombia) S. Patiño (SEA); F - (United States) Dorsey (COL); D - (United States) Raben (COL); D - (Netherlands) Krutzen (REA); M - (England) Bentley (GPP); M - (United States) Murphy (NYR); GK - (United States) Jara (SGT)	
4	(Canada) St. Clair (NYR)	(Ghana) Ackon (LNU) (Ghana) Boateng (SFG) (United States) Botte (LIR)	(Canada) Polisi (TSS) (Germany) Dietrich (DDL) (United States) Dorsey (BVC) (South Africa) Timm (MYB)	(Japan) Ryosuke (DMM) (Canada) Danto (CGY) (England) Dozzell (WVC)	NA	
5	(United States) Mozynski (TBC)	(United States) Vom Steeg (VCF) (United States) Bennett (OKC) (Netherlands) Krutzen (REA)	(United States) Flores (GSF) (Spain) Campano (TBC) (United States) Sanon (PCM) (United States) Gordillo (LIR)	(United States) Robertson (DDL) (Nigeria) Achara (BLR) (Panama) Tejada (LAK)	NA	
6	(Spain) Cases (TUC)	(Saint Lucia) Pearson (DMM) (United States) Antley (SGT) (Serbia) Ilic (OCN)	(United States) Ortiz (POR) (United States) Prpa (CHI) (United States) Menke (BVC) (United States) Seagrist (CHE)	(Brazil) Shinyashiki (COL) (El Salvador) Chavez (MIS) (United States) Aldaco (WES)	NA	
7	(Chile) Jara (SGT)	(United States) Manning (DMM) (United States) Reeves (STL) (United States) Gracia (NCA)	(Colombia) Patiño (CGY) (United States) Fahling (ABU) (Republic of Ireland) Molloy (REA) (Panama) Piggott (MYB)	(Spain) Goñi (GSF) (England) Goldsmith (MIB) (United States) Coan (IMG)	NA	
8	(Germany) Strutz (REA)	(Haiti) Mompremier (OCN) (England) Clinton (CIN) (United States) Aune (SEA)	(Brazil) Paiva (VIL) (United States) Arslan (SGT) (Germany) Clasen (DMM) (United States) Capote (WVC)	(Canada) Shaffelburg (BLR) (Canada) Danto (CGY) (United States) Puig (OKC)	NA	
9	(United States) Mercado (DMM)	(Sweden) Lindstrom (CIN) (Canada) Montgomery (VIC) (United States) Bennett (OKC)	(Italy) Micaletto (SGT) (United States) Moon (LAN) (Colombia) Perea (MIA) (United States) Fernandez (NYR)	(United States) Roberts (REA) (United States) Guhl (BVC) (United States) Lawrence (ABU)	NA	
10	(Cuba) Miranda (GSF)	(United States) Stovall (DDL) (United States) Antley (SGT) (Japan) Yamamoto (MYB)	(Colombia) C. Patiño (CGY) (United States) Reeves (STL) (Mexico) Elvira (BVC) (United States) Da Silva (NYR)	(Japan) Ryosuke (DMM) (Mexico) Botello (CRP) (France) Vassart (GPP)	NA	
11	(France) Mwembia (LNU)	(United States) Liberty (SFG) (United States) Mendoza (SIM) (Northern Ireland) McVea (LBR)	(United States) Moon (LAN) (Spain) Jimenez (MIS) (England) Okot (OKC) (United States) Meireles (ACC)	(United States) German (TUC) (Canada) Ricci (MIB) (England) Brown (SUP)	NA	

== All-League and All-Conference Teams ==
=== Eastern Conference ===
F: (Nigeria) Ifunanyachi Achara (BLR) *, (Jamaica) Khori Bennett (REA), (England) Charlie Ledula (LIR)
M: (Croatia) Jakov Bašić (BOS) *, (United States) Ricardo Gomez (MYB), (Republic of Ireland) Aaron Molloy (REA) *, (United States) Brian Saramago (NYR) *
D: (Nigeria) Prosper Figbe (BLR), (Canada) Kamal Miller (REA)*, (Republic of Ireland) Kevin O'Toole (NYR)
G: (Germany) Bennet Strutz (REA)*

=== Central Conference ===
F: (Canada) Austin Ricci (MIB), (Japan) Kinoshita Ryosuke (DMM) *, (United States) Tucker Stephenson (KAW) *
M: (United States) Kyle Carr (LNU), (United States) Brad Dunwell (MIB) *, (United States) Luka Prpa (CHI) *, (United States) Tate Robertson (DAY) *
D: (Ghana) Ebenezer Ackon (LNU), (Sweden) Mark Lindstrom (CIN), (United States) Grant Stoneman (CHI)*
G: (United States) Carlos Mercado (DMM)

=== Southern Conference ===
F: (United States) Brandon Guhl (BVC), (Panama) Juan Tejada (LAK), (Germany) Marek Weber (SCU) *
M: (Republic of Ireland) David Graydon (SIM), (Italy) Marco Micaletto (SGT) *, (Brazil) Leonardo Paiva (VIL), (Spain) Toni Soler (SGT)
D: (Canada) Mathieu Laurent (BIR), (England) Jordan Skelton (MIS) *, (Brazil) Gabriel Torres (VIL) *
G: (Chile) Pablo Jara (SGT)

=== Western Conference ===
F: (Canada) Moses Danto (CGY) *, (Colombia) Santiago Patino (SEA) *, (Spain) Samuel Villava (GSF)
M: (England) Elijah Adekugbe (CGY), (Canada) Nico Pasquotti (CGY), (Canada) Matteo Polisi (TSS), (United States) Willy Spurr (LAN)*
D: (England) Henry Lander (TUC), (Canada) Callum Montgomery (VIC) *, (Canada) Dominick Zator (CGY) *
G: (Canada) Marco Carducci (CGY) *

* denotes All-League player

=== All-League Team ===
F: (Japan) Kinoshita Ryosuke (DMM) (League MVP), (Germany) Marek Weber (SCU) (Golden Boot), (Canada) Moses Danto (CGY)
M: (Republic of Ireland) Aaron Molloy (REA), (United States) Tate Robertson (DAY), (United States) Luka Prpa (CHI) (Young (U21) Player of the Year), (Italy) Marco Micaletto (SGT)
D: (England) Jordan Skelton (MIS) (Defender of the Year), (Brazil) Gabriel Torres (VIL), (Canada) Callum Montgomery (VIC)
G: (Canada) Marco Carducci (CGY) (Golden Glove)

=== All-League Team Honorable Mentions ===
F: (Nigeria) Ifunanyachi Achara (BLR), (United States) Tucker Stephenson (KAW), (Colombia) Santiago Patino (SEA)
M: (Croatia) Jakov Bašić (BOS), (United States) Brian Saramago (NYR), (United States) Brad Dunwell (MIB), (United States) Willy Spurr (LAN)
D: (Canada) Kamal Miller (REA), (United States) Grant Stoneman (CHI), (Canada) Dominick Zator (CGY)
G: (Germany) Bennet Strutz (REA)
