= 2015 PDL season =

USL Premier Development League
- Season: 2015
- Champions: K-W United FC (1st Title)
- Regular Season Champions: Michigan Bucks (4th Title)
- Matches: 432
- Goals: 1,373 (3.18 per match)
- Best player: (Jamaica) Anthony Grant Seacoast United Phantoms
- Top goalscorer: (Jamaica) Anthony Grant Seacoast United Phantoms (12 Goals)
- Best goalkeeper: (United States) Matt Grosey Kitsap Pumas
- Biggest home win: DMM 10, CHI 0 (July 17); DCU 10, WES 0 (July 18)
- Biggest away win: JER 8, WES 1 (June 10)
- Highest scoring: DMM 10, CHI 0 (July 17); DCU 10, WES 0 (July 18)
- Longest winning run: 6, Charlotte Eagles (May 16 - June 13)
- Longest unbeaten run: 14, Charlotte Eagles (entire season)
- Longest winless run: 14, WSA Winnipeg (entire season)
- Longest losing run: 6, Westchester Flames (May 9 - June 13)
- Highest attendance: 8,151 POR vs. KIT (May 29)
- Lowest attendance: 20 FLA vs. IMG (June 14)
- Average attendance: 458 (224 of 303 games reported)

The 2015 USL Premier Development League season was the 21st season of the PDL and consisted of 63 teams across 10 divisions. The regular season began on May 2 and ended on July 19. The Michigan Bucks were the defending champions and posted the best overall record in the League; however, they were defeated by K-W United FC in the Central Conference finals. K-W United went on to win the league championship by defeating the Seattle Sounders FC U-23 1-0 in the semi-finals and in high scoring final they overcame the New York Red Bulls U-23 4-3. 63 clubs competed in the semi-professional soccer leagues.

== Changes from 2014 ==
=== New/Returning teams ===
Team name	Metro area	Location	Previous affiliation
(North Carolina) Charlotte Eagles	Charlotte metropolitan area	Charlotte, North Carolina	USL Pro
(Pennsylvania) Lehigh Valley United Sonic	Lehigh Valley	Bethlehem, Pennsylvania	NPSL
(Florida) FC Miami City Champions	Miami-Dade	Miami, Florida	Expansion Team
(Alberta) Calgary Foothills FC	Calgary Region	Calgary, Alberta	Expansion Team
(California) Burlingame Dragons FC	Bay Area	Burlingame, California	Expansion Team
(Ohio) Dayton Dutch Lions	Dayton metropolitan area	West Carrollton, Ohio	USL Pro
(New York (state)) New York Red Bulls U-23	New York City	Hanover, New Jersey	NPSL
(Florida) Palm Beach Suns FC	Miami-Dade	Boca Raton, Florida	Expansion Team
(Ontario) Toronto FC Academy	Greater Toronto Area	Vaughan, Ontario	Expansion Team

=== Name Changes ===
- Connecticut FC Azul became AC Connecticut.
- River City Rovers became Derby City Rovers.
- Los Angeles Misioneros became Golden State Misioneros.
- Springfield Demize became Springfield Synergy FC.
- Northern Virginia Royals became D.C. United U-23.

=== Folding/moving ===
- Austin Aztex - Moved to Division III USL.
- Chicago Inferno - Folded in the middle of the 2014 season on June 20, 2014 and forfeited their last 9 games.
- Montreal Impact U23 - Folded
- NJ-LUSO Parma - Folded
- Panama City Beach Pirates - Folded
- San Jose Earthquakes U23 - replaced by Burlingame Dragons FC (see above) as the Earthquakes PDL team.
- Toronto Lynx - Folded its PDL team. Still active in USL Super-20 League and Super Y-League.
- Vancouver Whitecaps FC U-23 - Folded
- Vermont Voltage - Folded its PDL team.
- Victoria Highlanders - Moved to the Pacific Coast Soccer League

== Standings ==
2015 Premier Development League standings.

Key to colours in group tables
Team in position to win Division Title
Team in position to qualify for playoff berth

Note: The first tie-breaker in PDL standings is head-to-head results between teams tied on points, which is why some teams with inferior goal differences finish ahead in the standings.

=== Central Conference ===
==== Great Lakes Division ====
Pos	Team	Pld	W	L	T	GF	GA	GD	Pts
1	Michigan Bucks (R, C)	14	11	1	2	46	12	+34	35
2	K-W United FC (T)	14	11	2	1	35	13	+22	34
3	Forest City London (T)	14	9	4	1	31	18	+13	28
4	Toronto FC Academy	14	3	8	3	19	30	−11	12
5	Dayton Dutch Lions	14	3	9	2	12	30	−18	11
6	Pittsburgh Riverhounds U23	14	3	9	2	10	31	−21	11
7	Derby City Rovers	14	2	9	3	18	35	−17	9

(C) Champions; (R) Regular Season Champions; (T) Qualified, but not yet for the particular phase indicated

==== Heartland Division ====
Pos	Team	Pld	W	L	T	GF	GA	GD	Pts
1	Des Moines Menace (C)	14	11	2	1	38	7	+31	34
2	Thunder Bay Chill (T)	14	9	2	3	34	15	+19	30
3	Chicago Fire U-23	14	6	6	2	19	30	−11	20
4	Springfield Synergy	14	5	6	3	21	17	+4	18
5	St. Louis Lions	14	4	8	2	19	32	−13	11 (Note: St. Louis Lions deducted three points.)
6	WSA Winnipeg	14	0	12	2	9	43	−34	2

(C) Champions; (T) Qualified, but not yet for the particular phase indicated

=== Eastern Conference ===
==== Mid Atlantic Division ====
Pos	Team	Pld	W	L	T	GF	GA	GD	Pts
1	New York Red Bulls U-23 (C)	14	9	2	3	40	19	+21	30
2	Long Island Rough Riders (T)	14	9	4	1	33	20	+13	28
3	Jersey Express S.C. (T)	14	8	3	3	36	14	+22	27 (Note: Jersey Express qualified for playoffs per tie breaking rules as they beat Reading 1-0 in their only head-to-head match.)
4	Reading United AC	14	8	3	3	36	14	+22	27
5	D.C. United U-23	14	8	2	4	32	20	+12	25 (Note: DC United U-23 deducted three points.)
6	Ocean City Nor'easters	14	7	4	3	31	16	+15	24
7	Baltimore Bohemians	14	4	8	2	22	31	−9	14
8	F.A. Euro	14	3	9	2	17	32	−15	11
9	Westchester Flames	14	1	12	1	13	63	−50	4
10	Lehigh Valley United Sonic	14	1	12	1	15	48	−33	4

(C) Champions; (T) Qualified, but not yet for the particular phase indicated

==== Northeast Division ====
Pos	Team	Pld	W	L	T	GF	GA	GD	Pts
1	GPS Portland Phoenix (C)	14	8	1	5	19	9	+10	29
2	Seacoast United Phantoms (T)	14	9	3	2	32	16	+16	29
3	Real Boston Rams	14	7	4	3	34	17	+17	24
4	AC Connecticut	14	2	7	5	12	28	−16	11
5	Western Mass Pioneers	14	1	11	2	9	34	−25	5

(C) Champions; (T) Qualified, but not yet for the particular phase indicated

==== South Atlantic Division ====
Pos	Team	Pld	W	L	T	GF	GA	GD	Pts
1	Charlotte Eagles (C)	14	10	0	4	31	8	+23	34
2	Cincinnati Dutch Lions (T)	14	8	5	1	30	25	+5	25
3	King's Warriors	14	5	5	4	21	14	+7	19
4	Carolina Dynamo	14	5	7	2	16	21	−5	17
5	West Virginia Chaos	14	4	7	3	17	23	−6	15
6	SC United Bantams	14	2	9	3	13	35	−22	9

(C) Champions; (T) Qualified, but not yet for the particular phase indicated

=== Southern Conference ===
==== Mid South Division ====
Pos	Team	Pld	W	L	T	GF	GA	GD	Pts
1	Mississippi Brilla (C)	12	6	3	3	23	15	+8	21 (Note: Mississippi is champion per head-to-head versus Midland/Odessa (2-1-1) as that is the first tiebreaker with goal differential next.)
2	Midland/Odessa Sockers (T)	14	6	5	3	24	14	+10	21
3	Laredo Heat	14	5	7	2	17	28	−11	17
4	Houston Dutch Lions	12	4	7	1	19	28	−9	13

(C) Champions; (T) Qualified, but not yet for the particular phase indicated

==== Southeast Division ====
Pos	Team	Pld	W	L	T	GF	GA	GD	Pts
1	Ocala Stampede (C)	14	8	3	3	28	16	+12	27
2	FC Miami City Champions (T)	14	7	4	3	18	14	+4	24
3	SW Florida Adrenaline	14	6	4	4	26	12	+14	22
4	Floridians FC	14	5	7	2	18	21	−3	17
5	IMG Academy Bradenton	14	5	7	2	17	29	−12	17
6	Palm Beach Suns FC	14	5	8	1	18	27	−9	16
7	Orlando City U-23	14	3	6	5	14	20	−6	14

(C) Champions; (T) Qualified, but not yet for the particular phase indicated

=== Western Conference ===
==== Mountain Division ====
Pos	Team	Pld	W	L	T	GF	GA	GD	Pts
1	FC Tucson (C)	14	8	2	4	28	15	+13	28
2	Albuquerque Sol FC (T)	14	8	3	3	19	12	+7	27
3	Las Vegas Mobsters	14	5	6	3	19	19	0	18
4	Real Colorado Foxes (Note: Real Colorado Foxes deducted three points.)	14	5	4	5	20	21	−1	17
5	BYU Cougars	14	1	8	5	17	28	−11	8

(C) Champions; (T) Qualified, but not yet for the particular phase indicated

==== Northwest Division ====
Pos	Team	Pld	W	L	T	GF	GA	GD	Pts
1	Kitsap Pumas (C)	12	10	0	2	23	4	+19	32
2	Portland Timbers U23's (T)	12	6	2	4	17	9	+8	22
3	Seattle Sounders FC U-23 (T)	12	7	4	1	21	10	+11	22
4	Calgary Foothills FC	12	3	2	7	15	16	−1	16
5	Lane United FC	12	3	7	2	16	23	−7	11
6	Washington Crossfire	12	1	8	3	13	28	−15	6
7	Puget Sound Gunners FC	12	0	7	5	11	26	−15	5

(C) Champions; (T) Qualified, but not yet for the particular phase indicated

Note: The Northwest Division will play a 12 game balanced schedule with each team facing all opponents in the division once at home and once away.

==== Southwest Division ====
Pos	Team	Pld	W	L	T	GF	GA	GD	Pts
1	Burlingame Dragons FC (C)	14	10	1	3	20	10	+10	33
2	Ventura County Fusion (T)	14	10	2	2	19	8	+11	32
3	Fresno Fuego	14	6	5	3	30	19	+11	21
4	Southern California Seahorses	14	3	8	3	18	24	−6	12
5	Golden State Misioneros	14	2	9	3	14	25	−11	9
6	Orange County Blues U23	14	2	11	1	11	32	−21	7

(C) Champions; (T) Qualified, but not yet for the particular phase indicated

== Conference Championships ==
Participants in the four conference championships were determined according to the specific rules of each conference. Games played prior to the conference semifinals are hosted by the team with the better record with the conference championships (semifinals and final) played at a common location. Note that the Northwest division played 12 games rather than the 14 played by the other divisions; the teams agreed to the reduced schedule in order for the division to play a balanced schedule.

Eastern Conference
The 1st and 2nd place teams from the Northeast and South Atlantic divisions play each other for their division's spot in the conference semifinals. The Mid Atlantic division 1st place teams goes straight to the conference semifinals with the 2nd and 3rd place teams playing each other for the final spot.
Southern Conference
The top two teams in each division qualify to play in the conference semifinals, with the 1st place team from the Mid-South division playing the 2nd place team of the Southeast division and vice versa.
Central Conference
The top two teams from Heartland division and the 1st place team from the Great Lakes division qualify for the semifinals with the final spot coming from a playoff between the 2nd and 3rd place teams in the Great Lakes division.
Western Conference
The Mountain and Southwest divisions have a play off between the 1st and 2nd place teams for their division's spot in the conference semifinals. The Northwest division's 1st place team and the winner of a playoff between the 2nd and 3rd place teams qualify for the conference semifinals.

=== Eastern Conference Championship ===
July 21, 2015 Mid Atlantic Division Qualifier	Long Island Rough Riders (New York (state))	1–3	(New Jersey) Jersey Express S.C.	Cy Donnelly Stadium; South Huntington, New York
7:00 PM EDT	Murphy (yellow card) 35'; Kramer 48'; Whitcomb (yellow card) 50'	Report	Alvarenzo 52'; Robertinho 62'; Kherlopian 87'	Referee: Rosario Camdelia

July 21, 2015 Northeast Division Qualifier	GPS Portland Phoenix (Maine)	2–1 (a.e.t.)	(New Hampshire) Seacoast United Phantoms	Yarmouth High School; Yarmouth, Maine
7:00 PM EDT	Wheeler 25'; Appah (yellow card) 45'; Greaves (yellow card) 65'; Shangraw (yellow card) 79'; Smith 103'	Report	McCabe 60' (yellow card) 70'; Goff (yellow card) 95'	Attendance: 850

July 21, 2015 South Atlantic Division Qualifier	Charlotte Eagles (North Carolina)	3–2	(Ohio) Cincinnati Dutch Lions	Queens Sports Complex; Charlotte, North Carolina
7:00 PM EDT	Regis 20', 38' (yellow card) 77'; Abubakar 28'; Odenbeck (yellow card) 43'; Botes (yellow card) 67'	Report	Dupont (yellow card) 36'; Smythe 40'; Schluter (yellow card) 67'; Merhaut 89'	Attendance: 550; Referee: David Erbacher

July 25, 2015 Semifinal	New York Red Bulls U-23 (New Jersey)	4–0	(Maine) GPS Portland Phoenix	Lubetkin Field; Newark, New Jersey
7:30 PM EDT	Lema (yellow card) 34' (goal) 63'; Swenson 45'; Knudson 52'; Farrell 66'	Report	Braem (yellow card) 33'; Campbell (yellow card) 76'; Melville (yellow card) 88'	Referee: Rosario Candela

July 25, 2015 Semifinal	(New Jersey) Jersey Express S.C.	1–1 (a.e.t.) (5–4 p)	Charlotte Eagles (North Carolina)	Lubetkin Field; Newark, New Jersey
5:00 PM EDT	Karcz 84'; DaSilva (yellow card) 88'; Ferreira (yellow card) 117'	Report	Culbertson (yellow card) 65'; Regis (yellow card) 78'; McCarter (yellow card) 85'; Kremers 90' (yellow card) 116'	Referee: Dave Breckner
	Penalties
	Correa (penalty scored); DaSilva (penalty scored); Argolo (penalty scored); Torres (penalty scored); Silva (penalty scored)		(penalty missed) Amankona; (penalty scored) Kremers; (penalty scored) Odenbeck; (penalty scored) Culbertson; (penalty scored) Regis

July 26, 2015 Final	(New Jersey) Jersey Express S.C.	1–2 (a.e.t.)	New York Red Bulls U-23 (New Jersey)	Lubetkin Field; Newark, New Jersey
5:00 PM EDT	Otto (yellow card) 43'; DaSilva 69' (yellow card) 72'; Correa (yellow card) 86' (red card) 117'; Lopes (yellow card) 106'	Report	Thomson 61'; Farrell (yellow card) 68' (goal) 115'; Knudson (yellow card) 71'	Attendance: 342; Referee: Bartek Cheislak

=== Southern Conference Championship ===
July 24, 2015 Semifinal	Ocala Stampede (Florida)	1–0	(Texas) Midland/Odessa Sockers	Clinton High School; Clinton, Mississippi
5:00 PM CDT	Hilton 80' (pen.)	Report	Dennis (yellow card) 84'	Attendance: 127; Referee: Mark Herrington

July 24, 2015 Semifinal	Mississippi Brilla	0–0 (a.e.t.) (2–3 p)	(Florida) FC Miami City Champions	Clinton High School; Clinton, Mississippi
7:30 PM CDT	Cruz (yellow card) 38'; Garces (yellow card) 53'	Report	Gonzalez (yellow card) 30'; Lopez (yellow card) 104'	Attendance: 1,020; Referee: Mark Dreifuss
	Penalties
	Cruz (penalty missed); Buffington (penalty scored); Almeida (penalty scored); Gonzalo (penalty missed); Tambini (penalty missed)		(penalty missed) Nirennold; (penalty scored) Garcia; (penalty scored) Valdes; (penalty scored) Merzouk

July 25, 2015 Final	Ocala Stampede (Florida)	2–0	(Florida) FC Miami City Champions	Clinton High School; Clinton, Mississippi
7:30 PM CDT	Hilton 39' (pen.); Diegues 48'; Parreiras (yellow card) 52'; Garcia (yellow card) 63'; Craig (yellow card) 65'; Arico (yellow card) 88'	Report	Rodriguez (yellow card) 37'; Mathieu (yellow card) 39'; Parrado (yellow card) 74'	Attendance: 159; Referee: Andrew Musashe

=== Central Conference Championship ===
July 21, 2015 Great Lakes Division Qualifier	K-W United FC (Ontario)	2–0	(Ontario) Forest City London	University Stadium; Waterloo, Ontario
7:30 PM EDT	Camargo (yellow card) 39'; Polk 60', 83'; Perez (yellow card) 65'	Report	Pucci (yellow card) 25'; Hemming (yellow card) 39'	Attendance: 337; Referee: Scott Decker

July 24, 2015 Semifinal	Des Moines Menace (Iowa)	2–3	(Ontario) K-W United FC	Ultimate Soccer Arenas; Pontiac, Michigan
5:30 PM EDT

July 24, 2015 Semifinal	Michigan Bucks	3–2 (a.e.t.)	(Ontario) Thunder Bay Chill	Ultimate Soccer Arenas; Pontiac, Michigan
7:30 PM EDT	Wysong (yellow card) 35'; Rezende (yellow card) 50'; Postelwait (yellow card) 75'; Devries 79'; Owens 85'; Adelabu 115'	Report	Silva 27'; Swartzendruber 43'; Roberts (yellow card) 54'; Andrade (yellow card) 73'; Campano (yellow card) 105'	Attendance: 912; Referee: Donovan Noocha

July 25, 2015 Final	Michigan Bucks	1–3	(Ontario) K-W United FC	Ultimate Soccer Arenas; Pontiac, Michigan
7:30 PM EDT	Rezende (yellow card) 43' de Vries 77'; Postlewait (yellow card) 81'	Report	Krolicki 9'; Polakiewicz 14' (yellow card) 36'; Cain 55'	Referee: Marc Lawrence

=== Western Conference Championship ===
July 18, 2015 Mountain Division Qualifier	FC Tucson (Arizona)	2–1	(New Mexico) Albuquerque Sol FC	Kino Sports Complex; Tucson, Arizona
7:30PM MST	Ramos (yellow card) 45'; Martinez (yellow card) 56'; Sandoval 61'; Reyna 86'; Espindola (yellow card) 88'	Report; Report	Zacarias (yellow card) 2' (goal) 28'; Rollie (yellow card) 39'; Lawrence (yellow card) 43'; Aguilar (yellow card) 87'	Attendance: 907; Referee: Robert Hullner

July 18, 2015 Southwest Division Qualifier	Burlingame Dragons FC (California)	1–0	(California) Ventura County Fusion	Burlingame High School; Burlingame, California
2:00PM PDT	Cadigan (yellow card) 66'; Razo 90' (yellow card) 90'	Report	Mercado (yellow card) 66'; Arramdani (yellow card) 85'; Okunorobo (yellow card) 87'

July 19, 2015 Northwest Division Qualifier	Portland Timbers U23's (Oregon)	1–4	(Washington (state)) Seattle Sounders FC U-23	Merlo Field; Portland, Oregon
3:00PM PDT	Macchione 6'; Sperber (yellow card) 30' (red card) 82'; Kahsay (yellow card) 54'	Report	Delgado 10'; Lee (yellow card) 29'; Olsen 64'; Campbell 73'; Johnson 90+'; Peterson (yellow card) 90+'	Attendance: 300; Referee: Andrew Marihart

July 24, 2015 Semifinal	(Arizona) FC Tucson	4–1	Kitsap Pumas (Washington (state))	Kino Sports Complex; Tucson, Arizona
8:00 PM PDT	Zambrano 31'; Espindola 35', 52', 59' (yellow card) 86'; Rodiguez (yellow card) 55'; Sinclair (yellow card) 89'; Prost (yellow card) 90+'	Report	Jenson (yellow card) 22' (goal) 64'; Masiman (yellow card) 65'; Keitz (yellow card) 72'; Jammett (yellow card) 78'; Patino (yellow card) 87'	Attendance: 1,522; Referee: Mathew Stewart

July 24, 2015 Semifinal	Burlingame Dragons FC (California)	0–1	(Washington (state)) Seattle Sounders FC U-23	Kino Sports Complex; Tucson, Arizona
6:00 PM PDT		Report	Delgado 60'; Lee (yellow card) 75'	Attendance: 1,522; Referee: Ramy Touchan

July 25, 2015 Final	FC Tucson (Arizona)	1–2	(Washington (state)) Seattle Sounders FC U-23	Kino Sports Complex; Tucson, Arizona
7:30 PM PDT	Reyna 36'	Report	Sukura 2'; Campbell 72'; Valot (yellow card) 78'	Attendance: 1,681; Referee: Matthew Sternheim

== Playoff Bracket ==
Divisional Qualification	Conference Semifinals
MA1	New York Red Bulls U-23	4
NE2	GPS Portland Phoenix	0
NE1	Seacoast United Phantoms	1
NE2	GPS Portland Phoenix	2
Eastern Conference
MA2	Long Island Rough Riders	1
MA3	Jersey Express S.C.	3
MA3	Jersey Express S.C. (PEN)	1 (5)
SA1	Charlotte Eagles	1 (4)
SA1	Charlotte Eagles	3
SA2	Cincinnati Dutch Lions	2
SE1	Ocala Stampede	1
MS2	Midland/Odessa Sockers	0
Southern Conference
MS1	Mississippi Brilla	0 (2)
SE2	FC Miami City Champions (PEN)	0 (3)
GL1	Michigan Bucks (AET)	3
HL2	Thunder Bay Chill	2
Central Conference
HL1	Des Moines Menace	2
GL2	K-W United FC	3
GL2	K-W United FC	2
GL3	Forest City London	0
NW1	Kitsap Pumas	1
MT1	FC Tucson	4
MT1	FC Tucson	2
MT2	Albuquerque Sol FC	1
Western Conference
NW2	Portland Timbers U23's	1
NW3	Seattle Sounders FC U-23	4
NW3	Seattle Sounders FC U-23	1
SW1	Burlingame Dragons FC	0
SW1	Burlingame Dragons FC	1
SW2	Ventura County Fusion	0

Conference Finals
MA1	New York Red Bulls U-23 (AET)	2
MA3	Jersey Express S.C.	1
SE1	Ocala Stampede	2
SE2	FC Miami City Champions	0
GL1	Michigan Bucks	1
GL2	K-W United FC	3
MT1	FC Tucson	1
NW3	Seattle Sounders FC U-23	2

Semifinals
MA1	New York Red Bulls U-23 (AET)	2
SE1	Ocala Stampede	1
GL2	K-W United FC	1
NW3	Seattle Sounders FC U-23	0

Championship
MA1	New York Red Bulls U-23	3
GL2	K-W United FC	4

== PDL Championship ==
=== Semi-finals ===
July 31, 2015	New York Red Bulls U-23 (New Jersey)	2–1 (a.e.t.)	(Florida) Ocala Stampede	Starfire Sports Complex; Tukwila, Washington
6:00 PM PDT	Innocenzi 7'; Echevarria (yellow card) 97'; Farrell 114'	Report	Parreiras (yellow card) 26'; Janneh 38'; Raymundo (yellow card) 45'; Arico (yellow card) 110' (red card) 112'	Referee: Charles Spaniola

July 31, 2015	(Washington (state)) Seattle Sounders FC U-23	0–1	K-W United FC (Ontario)	Starfire Sports Complex; Tukwila, Washington
8:00 PM PDT	Jones (yellow card) 90+'	Report	Büscher 90+'	Referee: Manuel Soledad

=== Championship ===
August 2, 2015	K-W United FC (Ontario)	4–3	(New Jersey) New York Red Bulls U-23	Starfire Sports Complex; Tukwila, Washington
2:00 PM PDT	Polk 6'; Perez 33'; Whiteman-Asiamah 45+'; Pasanen 62'; Rutz (yellow card) 71'; Krolicki (yellow card) 79'	Report; Report	Knudson (yellow card) 29' (red card) 90+'; Thomsen 52'; Williams 68'; White 82'; Echevarria (yellow card) 90+'	Referee: Kelsey Harms

Championship MVP: (Canada) Nathan Ingham (KWU)

== Awards ==
- Most Valuable Player: (Jamaica) Anthony Grant (SUP)
- Young (U21) Player of the Year: (United States) Timothy Mueller (LNU)
- Coach of the Year: (United States) David Dixon, (CHE)
- Defender of the Year: (Costa Rica) Dennis Castillo (POR)
- Goalkeeper of the Year: (United States) Matt Grosey (KIT)

== All-League and All-Conference Teams ==
=== Eastern Conference ===
F: (Jamaica) Anthony Grant (SUP) *, (Trinidad and Tobago) Nathan Regis (CHE) *, (Jamaica) Khesanio Hall (OCN)
M: Carlos Silva (JER) *, (England) Joe Holland (LIR), (England) Sam Blackman (SWV)
D: (Ivory Coast) Kouassi Sylvain N’Guessan (JER), (Switzerland) Tim Schmoll (NYR), (United States) Jordan Becker (BAL), (Ghana) Lalas Abubakar (CHE)
G: (United States) Matt Williams (GPS)

=== Central Conference ===
F: (Italy) James Pucci (LON), (United States) Ben Polk (KWU), (England) David Goldsmith (MIB)
M: (United States) Calvin Rezende (MIB), (Canada) Sergio Camargo (KWU), (England) Jacob Cawsey (STL), (Canada) Moses Danto (WSA)
D: (Norway) Oyvind Alseth (KWU), (United States) Zach Carroll (MIB), (United States) Andrew Herr (PIT)
G: (Japan) Yuta Nomura (SPS)

=== Western Conference ===
F: (United States) Timothy Mueller (LNU) *, (Spain) Guillermo Delgado (SEA), (Brazil) Pedro Espindola (TUC)
M: (United States) Todd Wharton (POR) *, (United States) Nick Hamer (KIT), (Peru) Renato Bustamante (FRE)
D: (Costa Rica) Dennis Castillo (POR) *, (United States) Jonathan Campbell (SEA) *, (United States) Cory Keitz (KIT), (Canada) Kalem Scott (TUC)
G: (United States) Matt Grosey (KIT) *

=== Southern Conference ===
F: (United States) George Kelley (HOU), (United States) Jason Collister (IMG), (Brazil) Paulo Vaz (FLA)
M: (Spain) Sergio Royo (MIS) *, (Algeria) Billal Qsiyer (SWF), (England) Lewis Hilton (OCA)
D: (France) Hugo Leroux (MIA) *, (United States) Walker Hume (MIO), (United States) Isaac Sanchez (MIO) *, (England) Paco Craig (OCA)
G: (United States) Michael Yantz (SWF)

* denotes All-League player
