= K–W United FC (2011–2017) =

- Full name: Kitchener–Waterloo United Football Club
- Nicknames: Rage, Black and Blue Army
- Founded: 2011; 15 years ago (as Hamilton FC Rage)
- Dissolved: 2017; 9 years ago
- Stadium: University Stadium; Waterloo, Ontario
- Capacity: 6,000
- President: Barry MacLean
- Head coach: Martin Painter
- League: Premier Development League
- 2017: 2nd, Great Lakes Division; Playoffs: Conference semifinals
- Website: www.kwunitedfc.com
Home colours

K–W United FC was a Canadian soccer team based in the Kitchener–Waterloo region in Ontario that played in the Premier Development League, the fourth tier of the American soccer league system. The club was originally formed in Hamilton, Ontario, as Hamilton Rage FC, until moving to Kitchener-Waterloo in 2012. The men's team also had a sister women's team of the same name, who played in the USL W-League. The club ceased operations in February 2018.

== History ==
=== Hamilton Rage ===
Hamilton FC Rage logo

On February 17, 2011, the Hamilton FC Rage were announced an expansion franchise in the Premier Development League expansion franchise on February 17, 2011, when the owner's of the women's team, Hamilton Avalanche (which would also be renamed as the Hamilton FC Rage in 2011) who played in the USL W-League, decided to add a men's team to the club. The club's official name was the Hamilton Football Club (Hamilton FC). They played their first competitive game on May 25, 2011, a 2–0 loss to the Toronto Lynx. They won their first game in their second game on May 29, defeating the Ottawa Fury 5-0. The club ultimately did not make the playoffs in their first season, but the team was lauded for its professional environment by players.

=== K-W United ===
Following the 2012 PDL season, the club was sold, renamed K–W United FC, and both the men's and women's teams were relocated to Kitchener-Waterloo due to low attendance numbers in Hamilton throughout the club's two seasons. The club formed a partnership with local youth club Kitchener SC. (The club had no affiliation with SC Waterloo Region, who also played in the Canadian Soccer League and were formerly known as K-W United FC.

In 2015, after finishing 2nd in the competitive Great Lakes Division, they won the PDL Championship, defeating New York Red Bulls U-23 on August 2 in the playoff final by a score of 4–3, becoming the third Canadian club to win a PDL title after the Thunder Bay Chill in 2008 and FC London in 2012.

In 2017, they formed a partnership with Major League Soccer club Toronto FC to serve as the team's PDL affiliate for two seasons, after Toronto FC withdrew their Academy team from the PDL after the 2016 season. However, a year later, in February 2018, the club ceased operations after not being granted sanctioning to play in the US-based PDL, due to the Canadian Soccer Association wanting them to join the comparable level League1 Ontario. Over the five seasons, after missing the playoffs in their inaugural season, they qualified for the playoffs each of the other four seasons. The club had a supporters group known as the Grand River Union.

== Notable former players ==
This list of notable former players comprises players who went on to play professional soccer after playing for the team in the Premier Development League, or those who previously played professionally before joining the team.

- (Canada) Jeff Addai
- (Norway) Øyvind Alseth
- (Panama) Jiro Barriga Toyama
- (Canada) Niki Budalic
- (Germany) Julian Büscher
- (Serbia) Miroslav Čabrilo (Hamilton)
- (Canada) Sergio Camargo
- (Canada) Jay Chapman
- (United States) A. J. Cochran
- (Canada) Anthony Di Biase (Hamilton)
- (Canada) Zachary Ellis-Hayden
- (Costa Rica) Ricky Garbanzo
- (Canada) Sam Gardner
- (Canada) Nathan Ingham
- (Canada) Evan James
- (Japan) Ken Krolicki
- (Canada) Mathieu Laurent
- (United States) Scott Levene
- (Germany) János Löbe
- (Canada) Darrin MacLeod
- (Canada) Kamal Miller
- (Canada) Jordan Murrell
- (Canada) Emeka Ononye
- (Canada) Nikola Paunic
- (Colombia) Nicolás Perea
- (United States) Ben Polk
- (United States) Justin Portillo
- (Canada) Austin Ricci
- (Puerto Rico) Darren Ríos
- (Canada) Dylan Sacramento
- (Saint Kitts and Nevis) Alain Sargeant
- (Saint Kitts and Nevis) Justin Springer
- (Canada) Dayne St. Clair
- (Nigeria) Uchenna Uzo
- (Canada) Stefan Vukovic

== Year-by-year ==
as Hamilton FC Rage

Year	League	Record	Regular season	Playoffs	Reference
2011	Premier Development League	5–3–8	6th, Great Lakes (9)	Did not qualify	
2012	Premier Development League	4–3–9	7th, Great Lakes (8)	Did not qualify	

as K-W United

Year	League	Record	Regular season	Playoffs	Reference
2013	Premier Development League	5–3–6	4th, Great Lakes (7)	Did not qualify	
2014	Premier Development League	8–3–3	2nd, Great Lakes (6)	Conference Semifinals	
2015	Premier Development League	11–1–2	2nd, Great Lakes (7)	Champions	
2016	Premier Development League	11–1–2	2nd, Great Lakes (7)	Conference Semifinals	
2017	Premier Development League	9–1–4	2nd, Great Lakes (6)	Conference Semifinals	

== Honours ==
- Premier Development League
  - Champions (1): 2015

== Head coaches ==
- (England) Brett Mosen (2011–2013)
- (Canada) Stuart Neely (2014)
- (Canada) Chris Pozniak (2015)
- (Canada) Martin Painter (2016–2017)

== Stadiums ==
- Brian Timmis Stadium; Hamilton, Ontario (2011)
- Ron Joyce Stadium; Hamilton, Ontario (2012)
- University Stadium; Waterloo, Ontario (2013–2017)
