= Carlos Mercado =

American soccer player (born 1999)

Personal information
- Full name: José Carlos Mercado
- Date of birth: September 27, 1999 (age 27)
- Place of birth: Laredo, Texas, U.S.
- Height: 6 ft 3 in (1.91 m)
- Position: Goalkeeper

Youth career
- Pachuca
- 2014–2017: FC Dallas

College career
Years	Team	Apps	(Gls)
2018–2019	Incarnate Word Cardinals	31	(0)

Senior career*
Years	Team	Apps	(Gls)
2018	Des Moines Menace	7	(0)
2019	Laredo Heat		
2019	Corpus Christi FC	1	(0)
2020–2021	San Antonio FC	1	(0)
2023	San Antonio FC	1	(0)
2024	Orlando City B	17	(0)
2024–2025	Orlando City	0	(0)
2024–2025	→ Orlando City B (loan)	25	(0)
- * Club domestic league appearances and goals as of October 5, 2025

José Carlos Mercado (born September 27, 1999) is an American professional soccer player who plays as a goalkeeper. Mercado was called up to represent both the United States and Mexico at a youth level.

== Youth and college career ==
Mercado wanted to play as a forward when he was younger, but he was put in goal for his brother's soccer team at 12-years-old after the team's goalkeeper bailed ahead of a game in a 30-and-over-league in order to prevent the game from being canceled. Mercado enjoyed the experience of playing as a goalkeeper, and he was praised for his performance, prompting his brothers to hire a goalkeeping coach for him. A few months later, Mercado tried out for Pachuca in an open tryout through an opportunity with his school, John B. Alexander High School, and was selected and joined the team's academy.

After a year with Pachuca, he tried out for both Houston Dynamo and FC Dallas' academies, but ultimately took up an offer from the former in 2014. Mercado participated in the Dallas Cup's 2015, 2016, and 2017 editions, including winning the 2017 edition. Mercado also participated in multiple U.S. Soccer Development Academy championships, including winning the 2014–15 and 2015–16 U-15/16 championships with the academy.

In 2018, Mercado began playing college soccer at the University of the Incarnate Word after receiving a receiving a full-ride scholarship. Mercado made 15 appearances in the 2018 season, making his debut against the Saint Mary's Gaels in a 6–0 loss on August 24. In 2019, Mercado recorded his first college shutout in a 1–0 win against the Liberty Flames on September 1.

== Club career ==
=== Des Moines Menace ===
On May 9, 2018, Mercado was announced to be on USL League Two (then the Premier Development League) side Des Moines Menace's roster. Mercado made his debut on June 1 in a 2–1 win over Kaw United FC and he recorded his first shutout on June 10 in a 3–0 victory over FC Manitoba. Des Moines finished first in the regular season with zero losses and one draw in the Heartland Division with the highest points total in the league, with Mercado only conceding half of Des Moines' six conceded goals. Mercado played in both of Des Moines' playoffs matches, but the club was defeated 1–0 by Chicago FC United in the Central Conference Final.

=== Laredo Heat ===
On March 21, 2019, Mercado joined Laredo Heat in the National Premier Soccer League.

=== Corpus Christi FC ===
Mercado joined Corpus Christi FC in USL League Two for the 2019 season. Mercado made one appearance for the club when he played half of an 8–1 loss to Brazos Valley Cavalry FC on June 1 in which he conceded half of those goals.

=== San Antonio FC ===
On March 6, 2020, Mercado joined San Antonio FC in the USL Championship. Mercado made one appearance for the club and made his professional debut when he came on as a 62nd-minute substitute for Matt Cardone on October 31, 2021 after Cardone sustained an injury in a 3–0 win over Colorado Springs Switchbacks FC. Mercado was let go at the end of the 2021 USL Championship season, but he rejoined the club on February 14, 2023 for the 2023 USL Championship season. Mercado made just two appearances in this stint with the club, a 2–1 win over Club de Lyon on April 4 in the 2023 U.S. Open Cup and a 3–1 win over Birmingham Legion on July 1 before once again departing the club at the end of the season.

=== Orlando City B ===
On March 15, 2024, Mercado was announced to be part of Orlando City B's 2024 MLS Next Pro season roster. On March 16, Mercado made his debut for Orlando City B in the season opener at Atlanta United 2 in a 3–2 victory, playing the full match. On August 11, Mercado recorded his first clean sheet in a goalless draw against Crown Legacy FC. On October 20, Mercado made his MLS Next Pro playoffs debut in a 1–1 draw at Chicago Fire II, but he was unable to stop any of Chicago's penalties in the ensuing shootout and Orlando City B were eliminated 5–4 on penalties.

On June 26, 2025, Mercado was selected to compete in the Goalie Wars in the MLS All-Star Skills Challenge on July 22 at Q2 Stadium in Austin, Texas alongside three other goalkeepers from MLS Next Pro. Mercado was ultimately defeated 4–3 by Houston Dynamo 2's Pedro Cruz in the final.

=== Orlando City ===
On September 20, 2024, Mercado was signed to a First Team contract with Orlando City through 2024 with options for 2025, 2026, and 2027. In December 2024, Mercado's option for extension was declined at the conclusion of the season without him making an appearance for the club. However, on January 30, 2025, Mercado was resigned to the team on a one-year deal with club options for 2026 and 2027 following Mason Stajduhar's departure earlier in the month. After the conclusion of this season, Orlando City also opted not to exercise a contract extension for Mercado.

== Personal life ==
Mercado was born in Laredo, Texas, but lived across the border in Nuevo Laredo because it was cheaper for his parents to live there and commute to work in the United States. Mercado also has five siblings and he is the youngest. Mercado is the uncle of fellow professional soccer player Sebastian Mercado and played alongside him at San Antonio FC.

== International career ==
=== Youth ===
Mercado has been called up up to represent Mexico at the U16 and U18 level, and for the United States at the U18 level. Mercado said that his family was "all Mexican", but through his experience living in both Mexico and the United States he felt a "calling for both nationalities".

== Career statistics ==
=== Club ===
As of match played October 5, 2025

Appearances and goals by club, season and competition
Club	Season	League			National cup		Playoffs		Other		Total	
Club	Season	Division	Apps	Goals	Apps	Goals	Apps	Goals	Apps	Goals	Apps	Goals
Des Moines Menace	2018	Premier Development League	7	0	0	0	2	0	—		9	0
Laredo Heat	2019	National Premier Soccer League	—		—		—		—		—	
Corpus Christi FC	2019	USL League Two	1	0	0	0	—		—		1	0
San Antonio FC	2020	USL Championship	0	0	0	0	0	0	—		0	0
San Antonio FC	2021	USL Championship	1	0	0	0	0	0	—		1	0
San Antonio FC	2023	USL Championship	1	0	1	0	0	0	—		2	0
San Antonio FC	Total		2	0	1	0	0	0	—		3	0
Orlando City B	2024	MLS Next Pro	17	0	—		—		—		17	0
Orlando City B (loan)	2024	MLS Next Pro	2	0	—		1	0	—		3	0
Orlando City B (loan)	2025	MLS Next Pro	23	0	—		—		—		23	0
Orlando City B (loan)	Total		25	0	0	0	1	0	0	0	26	0
Orlando City	2024	Major League Soccer	0	0	—		0	0	—		0	0
Orlando City	2025	Major League Soccer	0	0	0	0	0	0	0	0	0	0
Orlando City	Total		0	0	0	0	1	0	0	0	0	0
Career total			52	0	1	0	3	0	0	0	56	0

== Honors ==
Des Moines Menace

- Premier Development League regular season title: 2018
