= Stuart Neely =

Scottish football manager

Personal information
- Place of birth: East Kilbride, Scotland

Managerial career
- Years: Team
- 2000–2001: Canada U20 (women)
- 2009–2010: TFC Academy II
- 2013: Vancouver Whitecaps FC U-23
- 2014: K–W United FC
- 2014: K-W United FC (women)
- 2015–2016: Toronto FC Academy

Stuart Neely is a Scottish-born soccer administrator, head coach, scout, and technical director.

== Managerial career ==
Neely was named the head coach for the women's soccer program at Centennial College in 1994. He also coached the college's indoor soccer team in the winter of 1995 in the Ontario Colleges Athletic Association championship tournament. Following his stint at the college level, he became involved with the Ontario Soccer Association in 1997, initially as the association's director of player development. The provincial body also assigned him to coach the province's under-17 women's side in 1999. He also began managing in the professional realm in the United States-based USL W-League as an assistant coach for Toronto Inferno in 1999.

In 2000, he became involved with the Canadian Soccer Association as the head coach for the Canada women's national under-20 soccer team. He continued on with the women's under-20 program in 2001. In 2004, he returned to the provincial administrative level as a high-performance scout for the Manitoba Soccer Association. Neely had another run with the national association's men's under-20 soccer team as an assistant under head coach Dale Mitchell in 2005. During his tenure with the under-20 national team, he helped the team qualify for the 2005 FIFA World Youth Championship.

In 2007, he became involved in the local scene in the Greater Toronto Area as the technical manager for Caledon Soccer Club. During his tenure with Caledon, he became involved with Belgian side R.R.F.C. Montegnée as the club's scout.

=== Toronto FC ===
In 2008, Neely returned to the professional ranks by becoming involved with Toronto FC's academy program as an academy manager. The following season, he was named the academy's junior team head coach in the reserve division of the Canadian Soccer League. In his debut season in the inter-provincial circuit, he led the junior squad to a double by winning both the divisional and championship titles. He resumed his coaching duties with the junior team the following season.

After two years of managing the junior side, he was elevated to the academy's director. His time as academy director was short-lived as he announced his resignation after the conclusion of the 2011 season.

=== Vancouver Whitecaps ===
Following his resignation from Toronto, he secured a position with league rivals Vancouver Whitecaps in the winter of 2012 as the club's head of player management and advancement. In 2013, Neely was named the head coach for Vancouver's academy team in the American-based USL Premier Development League. After the conclusion of the PDL season, he departed from the organization.

=== Ontario ===
In 2014, he briefly went abroad to New Zealand to be named the governing body's head of football development. In the summer of 2014, he returned to the Southern Ontario region as the head coach for K–W United for both the men's and women's programs. Neely managed to secure a playoff berth with the women's side and was eliminated in the first round by Ottawa Fury. The men's team also secured a postseason berth by finishing second in their division. The club was eliminated from the competition in the first round by Des Moines Menace in a penalty shootout.

He returned to Toronto FC the following season to serve as the academy's senior head coach for the 2015 PDL season and as an assistant coach for the club's reserve team in the USL PRO. He re-signed in 2016 to once more manage Toronto's senior academy team.

In 2018, he returned to the national governing body in the capacity of manager of coach education under the auspices of director of development Jason de Vos.

=== British Columbia ===
After a three-year tenure with Canada Soccer, he returned to the western province of British Columbia as the technical director for the local side, South Delta United. In 2022, he joined the coaching staff of James Merriman as the technical director for Pacific FC in the national Canadian Premier League. The following season, he joined the expansion franchise Vancouver FC in the same role, but his tenure was short-lived as he departed in the summer of 2023.

== Honors ==
=== Manager ===
TFC Academy II

- Canadian Soccer League Reserve Division: 2009
