= Amos Magee =

American soccer player and coach

Personal information
- Full name: Amos Hart Magee
- Date of birth: September 7, 1971 (age 55)
- Place of birth: New Haven, Connecticut, United States
- Height: 5 ft 8 in (1.73 m)
- Position: Striker

College career
Years	Team	Apps	(Gls)
- Wesleyan Cardinals

Senior career*
Years	Team	Apps	(Gls)
1992–2003	Minnesota Thunder	?	(64)
2000	→ Tampa Bay Mutiny (loan)	7	(0)
2001–2002	→ Chicago Fire (loan)	6	(2)

Managerial career
- 2006–2008: Minnesota Thunder
- 2007: US Maccabi
- 2009–2010: Portland Timbers (USL) (assistant)
- 2011–2013: Portland Timbers (assistant)
- 2011–2013: Portland Timbers Reserves
- 2014–2016: D.C. United (assistant)
- 2014–2015: D.C. United U-23
- * Club domestic league appearances and goals

Amos Magee
Medal record

Representing United States

Football

Maccabiah Games
Bronze medal – third place	1993 Maccabiah	Football

Amos Hart Magee (born September 7, 1971) is the Director of Player Personnel for Minnesota United FC. As a player, he is the Wesleyan University Cardinals all-time leading scorer, won a bronze medal with Team USA at the 1993 Maccabiah Games in Israel, is the Minnesota Thunder all-time leading scorer, and played for the Tampa Bay Mutiny and the Chicago Fire. As a coach, he was Head Coach of the Minnesota Thunder and assistant coach for D.C. United. In the front office, formerly he was Director of Soccer Development for the Portland Timbers. He has been inducted into the Wesleyan University Hall of Fame, the Minnesota Thunder Hall of Fame, and the United Soccer League Hall of Fame.

== Early life and education ==
Magee is the son of Beatrice B. Magee and Paul T. Magee. He moved to Minnesota at 17 years of age and grew up in St. Paul, Minnesota, where he attended St. Paul Academy ('89) for two seasons, winning a state championship in 1987; he also attended East Lansing High School.

Magee received his bachelor's degree from Wesleyan University ('93), and his masters in Public Affairs from the University of Minnesota ('08).

== Soccer playing career ==
In St. Paul he played for the local soccer team, the St. Paul Blackhawks.

=== College ===
In college, Magee helped lead Wesleyan University to an ECAC Championship and school-best record of 15–1–1 in 1991. Magee is the Cardinals all-time leading scorer (35 goals and 85 points), was an NCAA D III All-American in 1992. He was a National Soccer Coaches Association of America (NSCAA) Division III All-American in 1992, and four times was named all-New England. In 2008 he was inducted into the Wesleyan University Hall of Fame.

=== Maccabiah Games ===
Magee played for Team USA at the 1993 Maccabiah Games in Israel, winning a bronze medal. He said: "There is nothing quite like representing your country in an international competition."

=== Minnesota Thunder ===
Magee played for the Minnesota Thunder for 12 seasons, retired in 2005, is its all-time leading scorer (64 goals and 39 assists), and was inducted into the USL Hall of Fame in 2008. He had several loan stints as a player with Major League Soccer sides, one season with the Tampa Bay Mutiny and two with the Chicago Fire. During his professional career, he played with the likes of Carlos Valderrama, Tony Sanneh, Hristo Stoichkov, Ante Razov, and Manny Lagos. He was named first-team all-league in 1998, and A-League Championship MVP in 1999. He was inducted into the Minnesota Thunder Hall of Fame in 2005.

== Soccer coaching and front office career ==
=== Maccabiah Games ===
At the 2005 Maccabiah Games in Israel, Magee assisted Team USA head coach Lev Kirshner, as the team won a silver medal. In December 2007, Magee coached the Team USA Maccabiah squad to the gold medal at the 2007 Pan American Maccabiah Games in Buenos Aires, Argentina; Al Albert was his assistant coach.

=== Minnesota Thunder ===
Magee was a player/assistant coach of the Minnesota Thunder in 2003–04, and its assistant coach from 2004 to 2005. He was named Head Coach of the Minnesota Thunder in October 2005, when he was 34 years of age. He resigned as Thunder manager on July 22, 2008, halfway through the 2008 season.

=== Portland Timbers ===
On November 21, 2008, Magee was inducted into the United Soccer League Hall of Fame. The same day he was also named Director of Soccer Development for the Portland Timbers of the USL First Division. In the winter of 2013 Magee left the Portland Timbers for family reasons.

=== D.C. United ===
He soon was hired in January 2014 as the D.C. United's U-23 Head Coach, and assistant to the First Team

=== Minnesota United ===
In November 2016 Magee left D.C. United to become the first Director of Player Personnel for the MLS expansion team Minnesota United FC.
