= Luis Fernando Hernández =

Luis Fernando Hernández may refer to:

- Luis Hernández (footballer, born 1998) (Luis Fernando Hernández Betancourt), Mexican footballer
- Luis Fernando Macías (Luis Fernando Macías Hernández), Mexican cyclist

== See also ==
- Luis Hernández (disambiguation)
