= Next Academy Palm Beach =

- Founded: 2015; 11 years ago
- Stadium: Oxbridge Academy
- Capacity: 1,500
- Manager: Head Coach
- Coach: Brian McMahon
- League: USL League Two
- 2018: 7th, Southeast Division; Playoffs: DNQ

Next Academy Palm Beach, formerly known as Palm Beach Suns FC were an American soccer club based in Boca Raton, Florida. Founded in 2015, the team plays in USL League Two, the fourth tier of the American Soccer Pyramid.

The club was purchased by Brazilian company Next Academy and renamed to Next Academy Palm Beach in December 2017.

Palm Beach Suns logo (2015–2017)

== Year-by-year ==
Year	Division	League	Regular season	Playoffs	Open Cup
Palm Beach Suns FC
2015	4	USL PDL	6th, Southeast	Did not qualify	Did not enter
2016	4	USL PDL	7th, Southeast	Did not qualify	Did not qualify
2017	4	USL PDL	9th, Southeast	Did not qualify	Did not qualify
Next Academy Palm Beach
2018	4	USL PDL	7th, Southeast	Did not qualify	Did not qualify
