= Mark Lindstrom =

Swedish footballer

Mark Lindström
Personal information
- Full name: Mark Da Silva Lindström
- Date of birth: 22 January 1996 (age 30)
- Place of birth: Gävle, Sweden
- Height: 1.90 m (6 ft 3 in)
- Position: Defender

Team information
- Current team: IK Sätra

Youth career
- –2016: Gefle IF

College career
| Years | Team | Apps | (Gls) |
| 2016–2019 | UNC Wilmington Seahawks | 68 | (2) |

Senior career*
| Years | Team | Apps | (Gls) |
| 2017 | OKC Energy U23 | 10 | (0) |
| 2018 | Cincinnati Dutch Lions | 12 | (1) |
| 2019 | Brazos Valley Cavalry | 2 | (0) |
| 2020 | Pittsburgh Riverhounds | 9 | (0) |
| 2021 | Sandvikens AIK | | |
- * Club domestic league appearances and goals as of 19 March 2021

Mark Da Silva Lindström (born 22 January 1996) is a Swedish footballer who plays as a defender for IK Sätra.

== Career ==
=== Youth, college and amateur ===
Lindström played at various levels with the youth teams at Gefle IF, before opting to play college soccer at the University of North Carolina Wilmington in the United States in 2016. He had also appeared on the bench for the senior team in Allsvenskan on three occasions. During his time with the Seahawks, Lindström made 68 appearances and scored 2 goals, as well as being named CAA All-Rookie Team in his first year.

While at college, Lindström also played in the USL League Two for OKC Energy U23, Cincinnati Dutch Lions and Brazos Valley Cavalry.

=== Professional ===
On 16 January 2020, Lindström signed with USL Championship side Pittsburgh Riverhounds. He made his professional debut on 15 August 2020, appearing as a 73rd-minute substitute during a 1–0 loss to Indy Eleven.
