= Luke Browne =

Luke Browne may refer to:

- Luke Browne (politician), see COVID-19 pandemic in Saint Vincent and the Grenadines
- Luke Browne, character in The Cured

== See also ==
- Luke Brown (disambiguation)
