= Ezana Kahsay =

Eritrean footballer (born 1994)

Personal information
- Full name: Ezana Yohannes Kahsay
- Date of birth: 16 November 1994 (age 31)
- Place of birth: Asmara, Eritrea
- Height: 1.88 m (6 ft 2 in)
- Position: Forward

Team information
- Current team: Tur Milejów
- Number: 15

College career
Years	Team	Apps	(Gls)
2014–2018	Akron Zips	80	(10)

Senior career*
Years	Team	Apps	(Gls)
2015	Portland Timbers U23s	2	(0)
2016	Saint Louis FC U23	12	(3)
2017	Erie Commodores	12	(6)
2018	Reading United	8	(2)
2019–2020	Virginia Beach City	8	(7)
2020–2021	Victoria Żmudź	17	(10)
2021–2022	Chełmianka Chełm	31	(16)
2022–2023	Motor Lublin	18	(2)
2023	Bałtyk Gdynia	13	(1)
2023	Mazovia Mińsk Mazowiecki	17	(4)
2024–2025	Podlasie Biała Podlaska	14	(2)
2024–2025	→ Mławianka Mława (loan)	9	(4)
2025	Siarka Tarnobrzeg	10	(0)
2026–	Tur Milejów	10	(1)

International career
2019	Eritrea	1	(0)
- * Club domestic league appearances and goals as of 20:00, 30 May 2026 (UTC)

Ezana Kahsay (born 16 November 1994) is an Eritrean professional footballer who plays as a forward for Polish IV liga Lublin club Tur Milejów.

== Early life ==
Kahsay was born in Eritrea. In 2005 his mother fled the country to avoid her son being taken to a military camp which was common for boys who had completed 11th grade. His brother and father had already been taken. Kahsay, along with his mother and sister, fled to neighboring Ethiopia where they remained in a refugee camp for six years. In 2011, the family was granted permission to immigrate to the United States and settled in Buffalo, New York.

== Youth and college ==
After settling in New York, Kahsay attended and played for The International Preparatory School, scoring 26 times during his time with the team. In 2014 he joined the Akron Zips of the University of Akron to play college soccer. In total he scored 10 goals in 80 appearances for the team, earning numerous individual and team honours.

== Club career ==
Kahsay signed for the Portland Timbers U23s of the Premier Development League in summer 2015. He appeared in two regular-season matches for the team as a defender. He made one additional playoff appearance for the team as they were defeated by Seattle Sounders FC U-23, resulting in elimination from the post-season. For the 2016 season he moved to Saint Louis FC U23, also of the PDL. He scored three goals in twelve appearances during the season. During the summer 2017 college offseason, Kahsay played for Erie Commodores FC of the National Premier Soccer League. He helped the team win the Eastern Conference championship. He scored six goals in the first five games of the season. Overall, he scored six goals in twelve matches, including a headed goal against Syracuse FC on the final matchday which clinched Erie's playoff berth. The forward returned to the Premier Development League again for the 2018 season. He made eight regular season appearances for Reading United AC, tallying two goals and three assists. He made four additional post season appearances as the team went on to win the Mid-Atlantic Division and Eastern Conference championships before falling to Calgary Foothills FC in the PDL Championship final.

After graduation from the University of Akron Kahsay was eligible for selection in the 2019 MLS SuperDraft. However, he went unselected. As a result Kahsay joined Virginia Beach City FC, another NPSL club, in May 2019. He debuted for the team on 12 May 2019 in a league match against FC Baltimore. Thirteen seconds into the match, Kahsay scored his first goal for the team, the fastest goal in club history. He went on to become the top scorer of the Mid-Atlantic Conference with seven goals over the eight-game season.

In 2020 Kahsay became connected with fellow Eritrean and former Greenland national team coach Tekle Ghebrelul. Kahsay joined Ghebrelul in Sweden and trialed with BK Forward of the Division 2 Södra Svealand, the fourth tier of the Swedish football league system. Despite impressing the club and a deal being offered, Swedish labor law would not allow it. Kahsay then went on trial with Concordia Elbląg of the Polish III liga. Despite interest in signing the player, the deal again fell through, this time because of the outbreak of the COVID-19 pandemic. Ultimately he signed for IV liga side, Victoria Żmudź in summer 2020. He got off to a fast start with the club, scoring three goals in his first three league matches. On 16 September 2020 he scored in a fourth round match of the regional cup qualification for the 2020–21 Polish Cup. However Viktoria was defeated in the match 1–2 by Hetman Żółkiewka. In the final match of the season, Kahsay scored his team’s only goal. Żmudź finished the season third in the standings, the club’s best result in its nine years in the league. However, on 12 July 2021 the club announced that it would withdraw from the IV liga because of financial difficulties caused by the loss of its main sponsor.

On 22 July 2021 Kahsay was announced as a new signing for Chełmianka Chełm of the Polish III liga. Two days later he scored his first goal for the club in a match with Orlęta Radzyń Podlaski. During his first season with the club he finished third in the league with eleven goals. Following the season it was announced that despite much interest from clubs in higher leagues, Kahsay would be remaining at Chełm for the remainder of the 2021–22 season.

On 10 July 2022, Kahsay moved to II liga side Motor Lublin, signing a one-year deal. He made 22 appearances in total, scoring thrice in all competitions, before terminating his contract in the winter of 2023.

On 28 February 2023, Kahsay joined III liga club Bałtyk Gdynia until the end of the season. It was reported that part of his salary would be covered through crowdfunding by Bałtyk's fans.

== International career ==
Kahsay was called up to the Eritrea national team for 2022 FIFA World Cup qualification. He made his international debut on 4 September 2019 in a qualification match against Namibia. He played 45 minutes in the eventual 1–2 defeat. However, a clerical mistake meant he was missing from the official match report. This trip marked his first return to his homeland since fleeing as a child.

=== International career statistics ===
Appearances and goals by national team and year
National team	Year	Apps	Goals
Eritrea
Eritrea	2019	1	0
Total		1	0

== Honours ==
Chełmianka Chełm

- Polish Cup (Lublin regionals): 2021–22
- Polish Cup (Chełm regionals): 2021–22

Mazovia Mińsk Mazowiecki

- Polish Cup (Siedlce regionals): 2023–24
