= Brian Saramago =

American soccer player

Personal information
- Full name: Brian Saramago
- Date of birth: November 9, 1998 (age 28)
- Place of birth: New Hyde Park, New York, United States
- Height: 5 ft 10 in (1.78 m)
- Position: Forward

Youth career
- 2014–2015: New York Red Bulls

College career
Years	Team	Apps	(Gls)
2016–2019	Loyola Greyhounds	68	(34)

Senior career*
Years	Team	Apps	(Gls)
2015–2016	New York Red Bulls II	7	(0)
2018–2019	New York Red Bulls U-23	23	(16)
2021	Long Island Rough Riders	0	(0)
2021–2022	NK Rudar Velenje	35	(19)
2022–2023	B-SAD	5	(0)

International career^{‡}
2016	United States U19	3	(0)
- * Club domestic league appearances and goals as of June 25, 2023 ‡ National team caps and goals as of July 25, 2021

Brian Saramago (born November 9, 1998) is an American soccer player who plays as a forward, most recently for B-SAD in Liga Portugal 2.

== Career ==
Saramago is a member of the New York Red Bulls Academy. During the 2014/15 season he led New York Red Bulls U-15/16 team with 31 goals in 32 matches. During the 2015/16 season he led New York Red Bulls U18 team with 25 goals in 25 matches.

Saramago made his debut for the New York Red Bulls II on June 6, 2015, against FC Montreal. He came on as a 72nd-minute substitute for Juan Sebastían Sánchez as the match ended 2–2.

In April 2021, Saramago signed with Long Island Rough Riders of USL League Two.

== Career statistics ==
As of April 13, 2021

Club	Season	League			League Cup		Domestic Cup		International		Total	
Club	Season	Division	Apps	Goals	Apps	Goals	Apps	Goals	Apps	Goals	Apps	Goals
New York Red Bulls II	2015	USL	5	0	0	0	0	0	—	—	5	0
New York Red Bulls II	2016	USL	2	0	0	0	0	0	—	—	2	0
New York Red Bulls U-23	2018	PDL	12	11	0	0	1	1	—	—	13	12
New York Red Bulls U-23	2019	USL2	11	5	0	0	2	1	—	—	13	6
Long Island Rough Riders	2021	USL2	0	0	0	0	0	0	—	—	0	0
Career total			30	16	0	0	1	1	0	0	33	18
