= 1993 Maccabiah Games =

14th Maccabiah
- Host city: Tel Aviv, Israel
- Nations: 48
- Athletes: 5,100
- Torchbearer: Yael Arad
- Main venue: Ramat Gan Stadium

The 14th Maccabiah Games brought 5,100 athletes to Israel from 48 nations.

Jewish athletes from Poland, Bulgaria, and Czechoslovakia participated for the first time after World War II, after the fall of the Iron Curtain. Athletes from eight Republics of the former Soviet Union also participated.

== History ==
The Maccabiah Games were first held in 1932. In 1961, they were declared a "Regional Sports Event" by, and under the auspices and supervision of, the International Olympic Committee. Among other Olympic and world champions, swimmer Mark Spitz won 10 Maccabiah gold medals before earning his first of nine Olympic gold medals.

== Opening ceremonies ==
A giant torch has been fixed in the Ramat Gan Stadium for this games and on.

Yael Arad, who had won a silver medal for Israel in judo at the Barcelona Olympics in 1992, lit the Maccabiah torch.

== Notable competitors ==
In wrestling, Canadian Olympian Andy Borodow won two gold medals, one in freestyle and one in Greco Roman. Canadian future Olympian Oleg Ladik won a gold medal in wrestling.

In soccer, Lev Kirshner and Amos Magee played for the United States as it won a bronze medal.

American Stuart Krohn won a silver medal in men's rugby. Shawn Lipman represented the United States in rugby union, was team captain, and was selected as MVP of the Rugby Event, as the team won a silver medal.

In tennis, Michael Zimmerman and Giora Payes of the U.S. won the men's doubles gold medals. Eric Friedler and Stacey Schefflin competed in tennis for the United States. Damián Furmanski competed for Argentina in tennis.

Russian grandmaster Yuri Averbakh competed in chess.

== Participating communities ==
The number in parentheses indicates the number of participants that community contributed.

- Argentina
- Australia
- Austria
- Belarus
- Belgium
- Brazil
- Bulgaria
- Canada
- Colombia
- Costa Rica
- Croatia
- Czechoslovakia
- Denmark
- Estonia
- Finland
- France
- Georgia
- Germany
- Guatemala
- Hong Kong
- Hungary
- India
- Ireland
- Israel
- Italy
- Latvia
- Lithuania
- Mexico
- Netherlands
- New Zealand
- Norway
- Panama
- Paraguay
- Peru
- Poland
- Portugal
- Romania
- Russia
- Samoa
- South Africa
- South Korea
- Spain
- Sweden
- Switzerland
- Turkey
- Ukraine
- United Kingdom
- United States (639)
- Venezuela
- Zimbabwe
