= K-W United FC (women) (2006–2014) =

K-W United FC
- Full name: K-W United Football Club
- Founded: 2006 (as Hamilton Lady Avalanche)
- Stadium: University Stadium; Waterloo, Ontario
- Capacity: 6,000
- President: Barry MacLean
- Head coach: Brett Mosen
- League: USL W-League
- 2012: 5th, Central Division
Home colours	Away colours

K-W United FC was a Canadian women's soccer team, founded in 2006. The team was a member of the USL W-League, the second tier of women's soccer in the United States and Canada. The team played in the Central Conference against teams from Laval, London, Ottawa, Quebec City, and Toronto.

The team played its home games at University Stadium in the city of Waterloo, Ontario. The club's colours were white, light blue and dark blue.

The team was founded in 2006 as the Hamilton Lady Avalanche. For the 2011 season, the team changed their name to Hamilton FC Rage. In 2013, the team moved to Kitchener–Waterloo, and were given their final name.

== Year-by-year ==
Year	League	Division	Regular season	Playoffs
2006	USL W-League	Northern Division	4th	Did not qualify
2007	USL W-League	Northern Division	5th	Did not qualify
2008	USL W-League	Northern Division	5th	Did not qualify
2009	USL W-League	Great Lakes Division	5th	Did not qualify
2010	USL W-League	Great Lakes Division	6th	Did not qualify
2011	USL W-League	Great Lakes Division	6th	Did not qualify
2012	USL W-League	Central Division	5th	Divisional Semifinals
2013	USL W-League	Central Division	4th	Did not qualify
2014	USL W-League	Central Division	2nd	Conference Finals
