= D.C. United U-23 =

Soccer team

- Full name: D.C. United U-23
- Nickname: Black-and-Red
- Founded: 2011
- Stadium: RFK Auxiliary Field; Washington, D.C.
- Capacity: 3,200
- Website: http://www.dcunited.com
| Home colors | Away colors |

D.C. United U-23 were an American soccer club based in Washington, D.C. The team last played in the fourth-division Premier Development League and represented the most senior age group within parent club D.C. United's academy system. The club was founded in 2011 and spent 2012 playing a string of exhibition matches against various PDL and NPSL clubs, before debuting in the National Premier Soccer League in 2013. The club's first coach was former D.C. United player, Jaime Moreno. For the 2017 season, D.C United's U-23 team will be playing against USL, PDL, and NPSL teams.

The club switched leagues in 2015, joining the PDL for the 2015 season.

== History ==
D.C. United U-23 was founded by Major League Soccer franchise D.C. United to serve as the most senior development side of the club's extensive development academy. The club was founded in 2011 and spent 2012 playing friendly matches against fellow amateur competition in the USL Premier Development League (PDL) and the National Premier Soccer League (NPSL), before launching its inaugural season in the NPSL in 2013.

Following the founding of the club in 2011, D.C. United announced that former player, considered fan favorite and club legend, Jaime Moreno, would be the U-23's first-ever head coach. After a single-season at the helm of the club, Moreno would move on to pursue other opportunities, with the goal of becoming head coach of an MLS team. Former professional player and experienced coach, Amos Magee, would be announced as Moreno's replacement for the 2014 season on March 7, 2014.

After a strong first campaign under Moreno, finishing 3rd in the Mid-Atlantic Division in 2013, the Black-and-Red would go undefeated in their subsequent season, finishing first in the division before bowing out in the first round of the playoffs, losing 1–0 to GBFC Thunder.

In February 2015, the club would announce a switch to the USL Premier Development League for the 2015 season, along with fellow and rival MLS academy club, the New York Red Bulls U-23.

== Year-by-year ==
| Year | Division | League | Regular season | Playoffs | Open Cup |
|---|---|---|---|---|---|
| 2013 | 4 | NPSL | 3rd, Mid-Atlantic | Did not qualify | Did not qualify |
| 2014 | 4 | NPSL | 1st, Mid-Atlantic | Regional semifinals | Did not qualify |
| 2015 | 4 | USL PDL | 5th, Mid Atlantic | Did not qualify | Did not qualify |

== Head coaches ==
- (Bolivia) Jaime Moreno (2011–2013)
- (United States) Amos Magee (2014–2015)

== Stadium ==
- Stadium at Maryland SoccerPlex; Boyds, Maryland (2011–2015)
