= Cañada College =

Community college in Redwood City, California

- Motto: From Here You Can Go Anywhere
- Type: Public community college
- Established: 1968
- Parent institution: San Mateo County Community College District
- President: Kim Lopez
- Students: 5,471 (Fall 2022)
- Location: Redwood City, California, United States; 37°26′53″N 122°15′54″W
- Campus: 131 acres (53 ha)
- Colors: Green and gold
- Sporting affiliations: Coast Conference
- Mascot: Colts
- Website: canadacollege.edu

Cañada College is a public community college in Redwood City, California. It is located on 131 acres (53 hectares) in the western part of Redwood City. The college offers 80 A.A./A.S. degree programs and 48 certificate programs.

== History ==
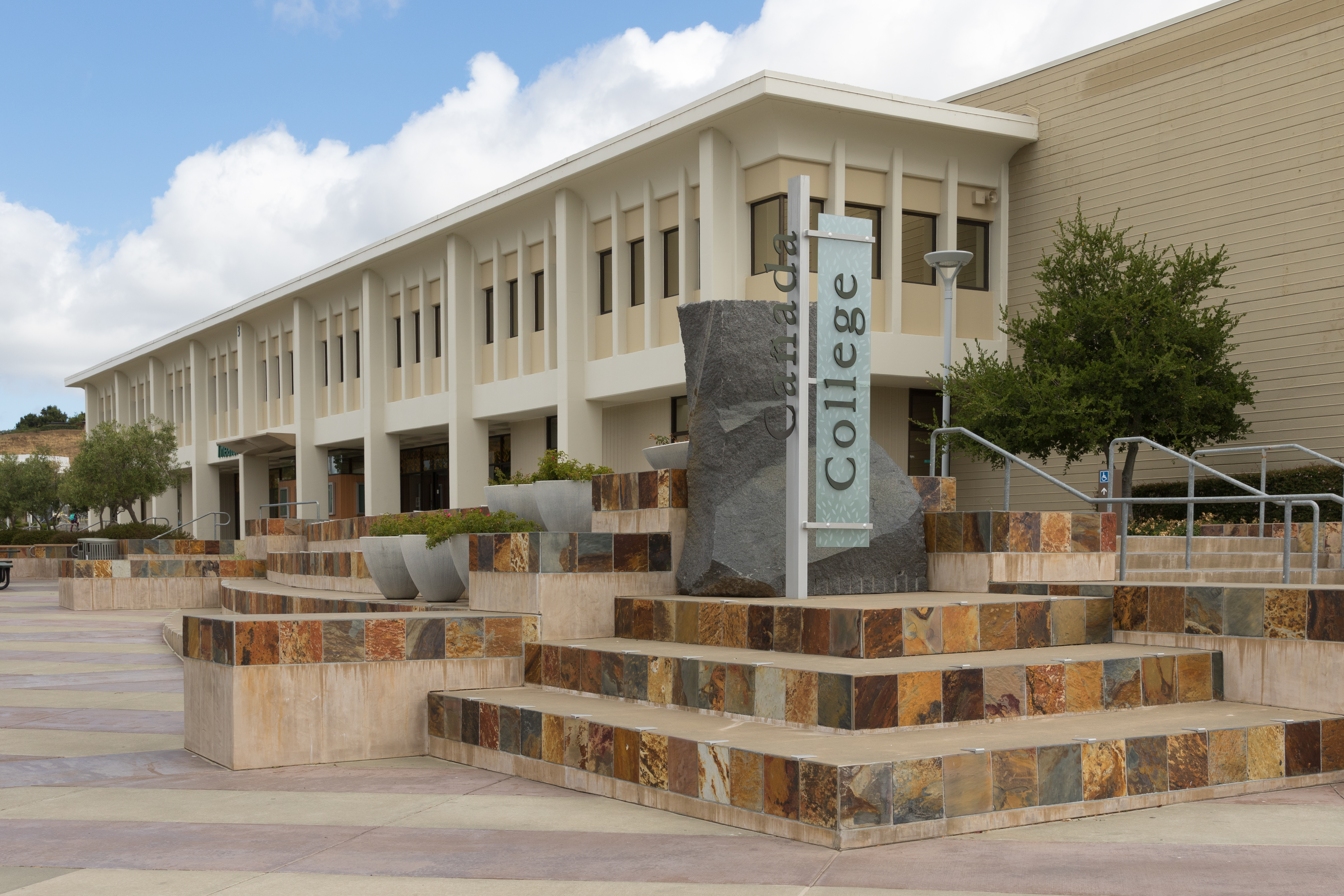
The campus of Cañada College.

In 1957, the San Mateo Junior College District Board of Trustees developed a 25-year district master plan based on the recommendations of a citizens' advisory committee, and the same year submitted a $5.9 million bond issue to voters that was approved by a three-to-one margin.

The bond issue victory cleared the way for prompt acquisition of the present College of San Mateo campus and also provided funds for purchase of a 111-acre (45-hectare) site west of Skyline Boulevard and south of Sharp Park Road in San Bruno. A third site of 131 acres (53 ha) west of the Farm Hill subdivision on the Redwood City-Woodside line, was purchased in 1962.

The current College of San Mateo campus was opened in 1963, followed by Cañada College in 1968, and Skyline College, San Bruno, in 1969. Construction of Cañada and Skyline was made possible in large part from proceeds from a second bond issue of $12.8 million approved by district voters in March, 1964.

Educational and architectural planning for Cañada was accomplished in 1964–66 and proceeded on the theory that a first phase for at least 2,000 students should be designed to permit expansion ultimately to 8,000 day students. Grading of the site began in 1966, and the building construction contract was awarded in April, 1967. The first classes – for 2,000 students – were held in September, 1968.

Cañada College is named after Cañada road that connects the college to Crystal Springs Reservoir to the North and Woodside, California to the South. The name Cañada is Spanish for a small canyon, glen, or ravine. The ravine is now filled with drinking water.

The total cost to build the campus was $12.2 million. The 241,000 square feet (22,400 square meters) of buildings cost $24.77 per square foot ($266.6/m^{2}) to build.

== Academics ==
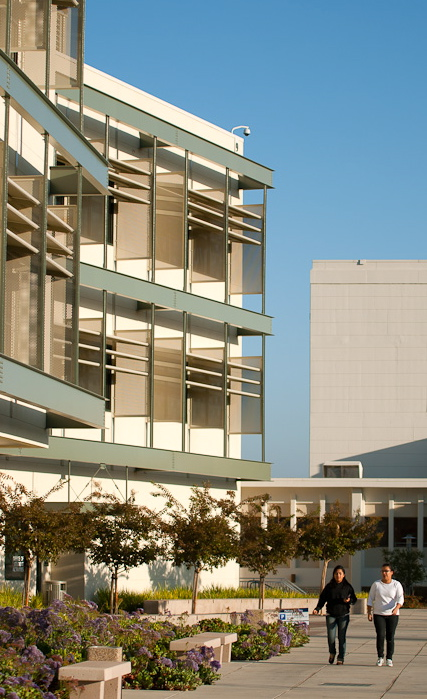
The Library & Learning Center at Cañada College

The college offers more than 40 instructional programs under three instructional divisions: Business, Design & Workforce; Humanities & Social Sciences; and Science & Technology.

Cañada is a regional center for Science, Technology, Engineering, and Mathematics (STEM) education. Through its STEM focus, it has developed partnerships with the NASA and San Francisco State University.

The college has a number of programs to support underrepresented and economically disadvantaged students.

== Student Life ==
Student demographics as of Fall 2023
Race and ethnicity	Total
Hispanic	45%
White	24%
Asian	13%
Filipino	5%
Multiracial	5%
Unknown	4%
African American	3%
Pacific Islander	1%

== Sports ==
Cañada won state championships in men's tennis in 1977, 1978, 1982, 1983, and 1993. The school won a men's golf state championship in 1988.

The Women's golf team won the Central Conference Championship in 2008, 2010, 2011, 2012, and 2013. They also won the NorCal Championship in 2012 and 2013 and finished third at the state championship in 2012 and 2013.

Sports offered at the college include baseball, men's basketball, women's golf, men's soccer, women's soccer, women's tennis, and women's volleyball.

== Notable alumni ==
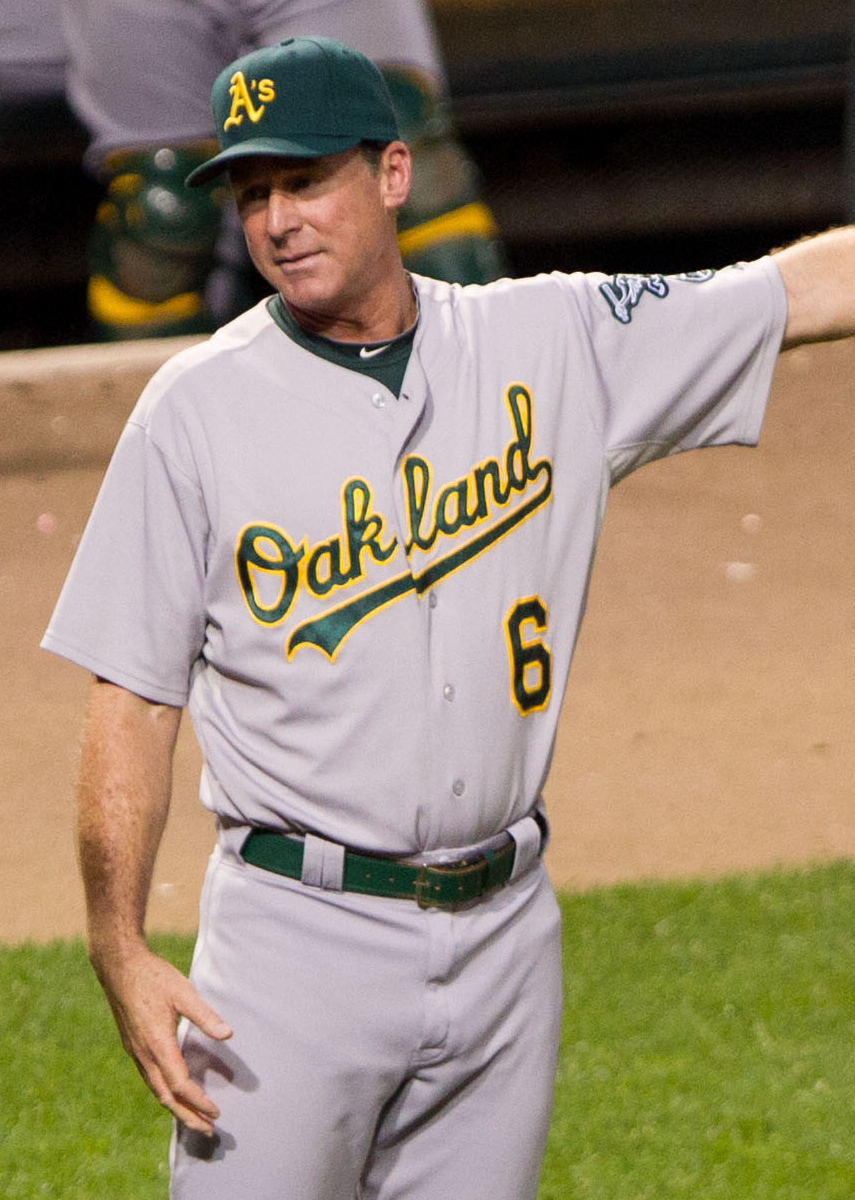
Bob Melvin

- Moisés Alou (born 1966), Major League Baseball outfielder
- Cara Black, author
- Anna Eshoo, U.S. Representative, earned an associate degree from Cañada College in 1975
- Bob Melvin (born 1961), Major League Baseball catcher and manager of the San Francisco Giants
- Harold Reynolds (born 1960), Major League Baseball player and MLB Network sports analyst
- Ken Rinaldo, installation artist working with technology and professor at Ohio State University, graduated from Cañada College in Computer Science

== Notable faculty ==
- Lev Kirshner, soccer player and soccer coach

== See also ==
- California Community Colleges system
