= Scott Levene =

American soccer player

Personal information
- Full name: Scott Jordan Levene
- Date of birth: August 31, 1995 (age 31)
- Place of birth: Stamford, Connecticut, United States
- Height: 1.85 m (6 ft 1 in)
- Position: Goalkeeper

College career
Years	Team	Apps	(Gls)
2014–2017	Connecticut Huskies	70	(0)

Senior career*
Years	Team	Apps	(Gls)
2017	K–W United FC	9	(0)
2018	New York Red Bulls II	4	(0)
2019	Memphis 901 FC	10	(0)
- * Club domestic league appearances and goals as of October 23, 2019

Scott Jordan Levene (born August 31, 1995) is an American retired professional soccer player who played as a goalkeeper for Memphis 901 FC and New York Red Bulls II in the USL Championship. Before turning professional, he played for the University of Connecticut.

== Career ==
=== College & Youth ===
Levene played four years of college soccer at the University of Connecticut between 2014 and 2017. He red-shirted in 2013. During his time, he started in 70 consecutive games keeping 31 clean sheets.

While in college, Levene also appeared for Premier Development League side K–W United FC in 2017.

=== Professional ===
On March 22, 2018, Levene signed for United Soccer League side New York Red Bulls II.
