= Lev Kirshner =

American soccer coach

Personal information
- Full name: Lev Kirshner
- Date of birth: June 17, 1969 (age 57)
- Place of birth: United States

College career
Years	Team	Apps	(Gls)
1987–1990	Rutgers Scarlet Knights		

Senior career*
Years	Team	Apps	(Gls)
- Reno Rattlers

Managerial career
- 1992–1994: Cañada Colts
- 1995: Ohlone Renegades
- 1996: Rutgers Scarlet Knights (assistant)
- 1997–1999: San Diego State Aztecs (assistant)
- 2000–2019: San Diego State Aztecs
Medal record
Representing United States
Men's Football
Bronze medal – third place	1993 Maccabiah	Team competition
Silver medal – second place	2005 Maccabiah	Team competition
- * Club domestic league appearances and goals

Lev Kirshner (born June 17, 1969) is the former head coach for the men's soccer team San Diego State University, who coached the team for two decades. As a player, he competed at the 1993 Maccabiah Games (winning a bronze medal) and the 1997 Maccabiah Games in Israel.

== Playing career ==
=== High school and college ===
Kirshner attended Mission San Jose High School in Fremont, California, where he played soccer and badminton, and ran cross country. He graduated in 1987 and was inducted into the school's first Hall of Fame class in 2001.

After graduating from high school, Kirshner attended Rutgers University, playing soccer for the school from 1987 to 1990. He graduated in 1991 with a bachelor's degree in communication with honors and as a member of the 1990 NCAA National Finalist team, the squad's members were inducted to the Rutgers Hall of Fame in 2015. Kirshner was also a part of the 1987 NCAA Quarterfinalist team and the 1989 Semi-Finalist team.

=== Maccabiah teams ===
Kirshner was a member of the U.S. national soccer team which won the bronze medal at the 1993 Maccabiah Games in Israel; the world's third-largest sporting event. At the 1997 Maccabiah Games, Kirshner captained the U.S. team, as they beat the gold medalist Brazil in group play. He coached Team USA at the 2005 Maccabiah Games.

=== MLS and USISL ===
Kirshner was selected for the first MLS combine held in Irvine, California, in 1996. Although not drafted or signed by MLS, Kirshner played professionally with the Reno Rattlers of the USISL, while guesting for MLS' San Jose Clash in reserve team and inter squad matches.

== Coaching ==
=== College ===
In 1992, Cañada College hired Kirshner as the head coach of the women's soccer team and assistant coach of the men's team. Up to that time, the team had never won a conference game. In 1994, Kirshner coached them to a 16–1–3 record, a California State Quarterfinal berth (losing in penalty kicks), while garnering Coast Conference Coach of the Year recognition.

In 1995, Kirshner moved to Ohlone College to be co-head coach with Harold Whitmore.

From Ohlone, Kirshner returned to his alma mater Rutgers where he was an assistant coach for the 1996 season. He helped Rutgers to an NCAA sweet 16 appearance while being ranked as high as 4th in the country.

Kirshner then moved back west to become an assistant coach at San Diego State in 1997. He served in that capacity for three seasons before becoming head coach in 2000. Kirshner went to back-to-back NCAA Tournaments in 2005 and 2006. In the 2010 and 2011 seasons, Kirshner also led the Aztecs to back-to-back 10-win seasons for the first time since 1991. Most recent, Kirshner's Aztecs went to the tournament in 2016 in a season highlighted by a top-10 ranking, finishing the regular season in the top 25, and beating the number 1 ranked team in the country; it is known to be the first SDSU athletic team to accomplish this feat. Kirshner was fired by SDSU in 2019 after 20 years as head coach.

=== Maccabiah ===
In 2003, Kirshner was the coach of the U.S. U-20 team which won a bronze medal at the Pan-American Maccabiah games in Santiago, Chile. He was elevated to the position of national U.S. Maccabiah team head coach for the 2005 Maccabiah Games, where the squad won the silver medal for the first time since 1981 as well as the tournament's Fair Play Award. Two future US World Cup players (Benny Feilhaber and Jonathan Bornstein) were on the squad as well as a number of future professionals.

=== Youth clubs ===
In 1999, Kirshner became the director of soccer operations of the Hotspurs Soccer Club. He left that position in 2002 to coach with Cliff Tabor at Rancho Penasquitos. Kirshner then followed his coaching partner, Tabor to the Carlsbad Lightning. Their Carlsbad Elite teams went to the State Quarterfinals as well as won the coveted Coast League Premier Cup.

=== Head coaching record at SDSU ===
Mountain Pacific Sports Federation ERA (2000–2004):

2000 6–12–1 record, CONFERENCE 2–4–1

2001 7–9–4 record, CONFERENCE 3–2-2

2002 4–13–2 record, CONFERENCE 0–5–1

2003 9–8–3 record, CONFERENCE 2–2–2

2004 4–13–2 record, CONFERENCE 4–7–1

Pacific-10 ERA (2005–2011):

2005 9–4–6 record, CONFERENCE 2–3–5

2006 9–6–4 record, CONFERENCE 5–2–3

2007 8–7–4 record, CONFERENCE 4–4–2

2008 6–9–3 record, CONFERENCE 3–4–3

2009 6–6–6 record, CONFERENCE 3–4–3

2010 10–7–2 record, CONFERENCE 3–6–1

2011 10–6–3 record, CONFERENCE 4–5–1

Pac-12 ERA (2012–Present):

2012 7–9–3 record, CONFERENCE 1–7–2

2013 6-11-2 record, CONFERENCE 2-6–2

2014 7–12-0 record, CONFERENCE 1–9–0

2015 8-8–3 record, CONFERENCE 2–7–1

2016 9-4-6 record, CONFERENCE 4–3–3

Career Record:

OVERALL: 125-144-54 NON-CONFERENCE: 80-64-21 PAC-12 CONFERENCE 45-80-33

== See also ==
- SDSU Aztecs
