= Carlos Patiño (footballer) =

Colombian footballer (born 1995)

Carlos Patino
Personal information
- Date of birth: 18 August 1995 (age 31)
- Place of birth: Tuluá, Colombia
- Height: 1.73 m (5 ft 8 in)
- Position: Midfielder

Youth career
- Inter SC
- 2011–2012: Vancouver Whitecaps FC
- 2012–2013: CAFA
- 2013–2014: FC Edmonton

Senior career*
Years	Team	Apps	(Gls)
2015	Kitsap Pumas	10	(2)
2015–2016	Seattle Sounders FC 2	27	(0)
2017	Vänersborgs IF	11	(2)
2018	Calgary Foothills	8	(1)
2019	Cavalry FC	11	(0)
- * Club domestic league appearances and goals as of 19 October 2019

Carlos Patino (born 18 August 1995) is a Colombian professional soccer player who last played for Canadian club Cavalry FC.

== Playing career ==
=== Kitsap Pumas ===
Patino played for PDL side Kitsap Pumas in the 2015 season. He made 10 appearances for the club and helped lead them to a Northwest Division title.

=== Seattle Sounders 2 ===
On 4 September 2015, Patino signed a professional contract with USL club Seattle Sounders FC 2. He made his professional debut a day later in a 2–1 defeat to Austin Aztex.

=== Vänersborgs IF ===
In August 2017, Patino signed with Swedish side Vänersborgs IF. He departed the club at the end of the season in October.

=== Calgary Foothills ===
Patino spent the 2018 season with USL PDL side Calgary Foothills FC. He would go on to win the PDL Championship that season with the club.

=== Cavalry FC ===
On 23 January 2019 Patino signed with Canadian Premier League side Cavalry FC.

== Honours ==
=== Club ===
Calgary Foothills

- PDL Championship: 2018

Calvary FC

- Canadian Premier League Finals
  - Runners-up: 2019
- Canadian Premier League (Regular season):
  - Champions: Spring 2019, Fall 2019
