= Luke Brown (disambiguation) =

Luke Brown (1935–1997) was an American professional wrestler.

Luke Brown may also refer to:

- Luke Brown (footballer, born 1902) (1902–1978), Australian rules footballer for Fitzroy
- Luke Brown (footballer, born 1992), Australian rules footballer for Adelaide
- Luke Brown (author) (born 1979), British novelist

== See also ==
- Luke Brown House, a historic home located in Parishville, New York
- Luke Browne (disambiguation)
- Brown (surname)
