= Jakov Bašić =

Croatian footballer

Personal information
- Full name: Jakov Bašić
- Date of birth: 25 November 1996 (age 29)
- Place of birth: Zagreb, Croatia
- Height: 1.91 m (6 ft 3 in)
- Position: Defensive midfielder

Team information
- Current team: Zorya Luhansk
- Number: 21

Youth career
- –2017: Reading United
- 2018–2019: Boston Bolts

Senior career*
Years	Team	Apps	(Gls)
2019	Hajduk Split II	5	(0)
2019–2021	Dugopolje	38	(5)
2021	Hrvatski Dragovoljac	1	(0)
2021–2022	Rudeš	23	(4)
2022–2023	Slaven Belupo	21	(0)
2023–2024	Rudeš	16	(0)
2024–	Zorya Luhansk	59	(3)
- * Club domestic league appearances and goals as of 3 June 2026

Jakov Bašić (born 25 November 1996) is a Croatian professional footballer who plays as a defensive midfielder for Zorya Luhansk.

== Club career ==
=== Zorya Luhansk ===
Jakov Bašić signed for Zorya Luhansk on 7 February 2024.

== Personal life ==
His twin brother Toma Bašić is also a professional footballer.
