= Brett Mosen =

English football coach

Personal information
- Place of birth: London, England

Managerial career
- Years: Team
- 1995: Nashville Metros
- 1997: Lincoln Brigade
- 1998: Southwest Florida Manatees
- 1999: Hampton Roads Mariners (assistant coach)
- 2000–2001: Nashville Metros
- 2002: Atlanta Silverbacks
- 2004: Toronto Lynx (U16 coach)
- 2005: Toronto Lady Lynx
- 2010–2013: Hamilton FC / K-W United FC
- 2014 –: Toronto Lynx (assistant coach)

Brett Mosen is an English football coach currently coaching with the Oakville Blue Devils FC in Canada.

== Managerial career ==
Mosen started his professional coaching in 1995 as Head Coach of the Nashville Metros in the USL A-League|United Soccer Leagues, leading the Metros to a 3rd-place finish in the Eastern Division and a place in the Divisional semi-finals. He was appointed Head Coach of the Lincoln Brigade in 1997 in the USL Premier Development League, finishing regular season as Division Champions but losing in the Play Offs first round to Des Moines Menace. In 1998, he led the Southwest Florida Manatees to the division semifinals. In 1999, Mosen was appointed assistant coach to the A League club Hampton Road Mariners.

In 2000 Mosen returned to Nashville for a second stint and was appointed Head Coach of the Nashville Metros where in 2001 he clinched a postseason berth for the club by finishing fourth in the central division. The following year he was appointed Head Coach for the Atlanta Silverbacks, where the team finished 3rd in the Southeast Division. The Silverbacks also advanced to the 3rd round of the US Open Cup and won the Southern Derby Cup, a fan-based cup competition between United Soccer Leagues teams based in the South-Atlantic region of the United States.

On 7 April 2004 Mosen joined the Toronto Lynx and was appointed Head Coach for the Lynx U16 boys head becoming part of Duncan Wilde's new managerial staff. In January 2015 he was appointed head coach for the newly acquired franchise the Toronto Lady Lynx competing in the USL W-League. The Lady Lynx finished second in the northern division thus clinching a playoff berth. The Lady Lynx reached the Eastern Championship, but were eliminated by the Ottawa Fury. From 2004 to 2010 Mosen was Club Head Coach/Technical Director with Oakville Soccer Club North America's largest youth soccer club boasting 13,000 members. In 2010 Mosen returned to competition and rejoined the USL becoming part of Hamilton FC's Ownership group taking on the role as Head Coach/Director of Football, in 2013 the club moved operations to the Kitchener/Waterloo area of Ontario and changed its name to K-W United FC. Mosen was named as the first head coach and Director of Football in the history of K-W United FC. On 31 January 2014 Mosen returned to the Toronto Lynx to serve under Duncan Wilde once more as part of his coaching staff. In 2015, the Toronto Lynx moved operations to Oakville Ontario and rebranded themselves as the Oakville Blue Devils FC where they compete in League1 Ontario Division.
