= Luis Hernández =

Luis Hernández may refer to:

== Footballers ==
- Luis Hernández (footballer, born 1949) (Luis Hernández Heres), Cuban football administrator and former midfielder
- Luis Hernández (footballer, born 1959) (Luis Hernández Cabrera), Cuban football midfielder
- Luis Hernández (footballer, born 1968) (Luis Arturo "El Matador" Hernández Carreón), Mexican football striker
- Luis Daniel Hernández (born 1977), Peruvian football left-back
- Luis Hernández (footballer, born 1981) (Luis Alberto Hernández Díaz), Peruvian football midfielder
- Luis Miguel Hernández (born 1985), Salvadoran football defender
- Luis Hernández (footballer, born 1989) (Luis Hernández Rodríguez), Spanish football centre-back
- Luis Hernández (footballer, born 1998) (Luis Fernando Hernández Betancourt), Mexican football midfielder
- Luis Donaldo Hernández (born 1998), Mexican football defender
- Luis Hernández (Costa Rican footballer) (Luis Jose Hernández Paniagua, born 1998), Costa Rican football defender
- Luis Omar Hernández (born 1985), Mexican professional footballer

== Other sportspeople ==
- Luis Hernández (runner) (born 1955), Mexican long-distance runner
- Luis Hernández (boxer) (born 1973), Ecuadorian boxer
- Luis Hernández (baseball) (born 1984), Venezuelan baseball player
- Luis Hernández (figure skater) (born 1985), Mexican figure skater
- Luis Hernández (fencer), Mexican Olympic fencer
- Luis Hernández (basketball), Puerto Rican basketball player

== Other people ==
- Luis Almarcha Hernández (1887–1974), Spanish cleric and politician
- Luis Hernández Cruz (born 1958), Mexican politician
- Luis Javier Hernández Ortiz (born 1977), Puerto Rican politician
- Luis Hernández Bretón, Mexican film composer
- Luis Hernández, member of the Norteño band Los Tigres del Norte
