= University Stadium (Waterloo, Ontario) =

Football stadium in Waterloo, Ontario

- Knight–Newbrough Field

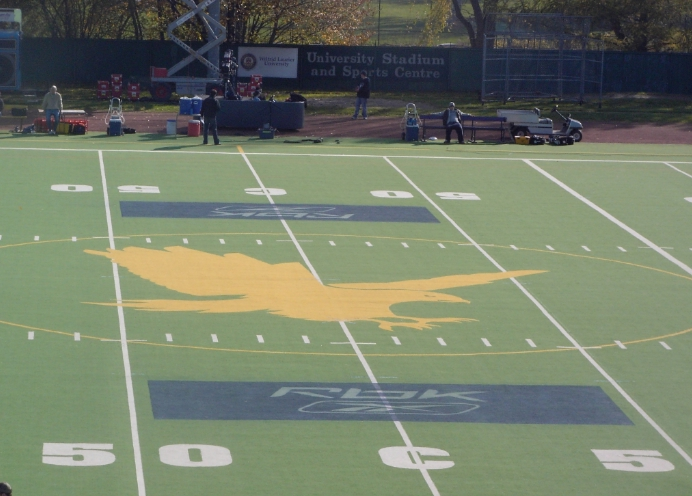
- The centre of University Stadium in 2005
- Interactive map of University Stadium
- Former names: Seagram Stadium
- Address: Waterloo, Ontario; Canada
- Coordinates: 43°28′13″N 80°31′48″W
- Owner: Wilfrid Laurier University (1992–present); City of Waterloo (1974–92); Waterloo College (1958–74)
- Operator: Laurier University Athletics (1992–present)
- Capacity: 6,000
- Type: Stadium
- Surface: FieldTurf
- Current use: Football; Rugby union

Construction
- Groundbreaking: 1957
- Built: 1958
- Opened: 1958; 68 years ago
- Renovated: 1992-1994, 2007

Tenants
- Wilfrid Laurier Golden Hawks teams: football, rugby; University of Waterloo (1957–2008); K–W United FC (2013–2017)

Website
- laurierathletics.com/university-stadium

University Stadium, also known as Knight–Newbrough Field and formerly known as Seagram Stadium, is a stadium on the campus of Wilfrid Laurier University in Waterloo, Ontario. The stadium has a capacity of 6,000 and serves as home to the Wilfrid Laurier Golden Hawks football and rugby teams.

It also served for several years as the home field of soccer side K–W United FC which ceased operations in 2018. Facilities include space for recreational programs and Kinesiology classrooms; there is also a large gym and the football field. The stadium is closed to the public.

The field was also used by the nearby University of Waterloo Warriors for their home football games. The Warriors played their final season at the stadium in 2008; they then moved to the new Warrior Field on the University of Waterloo north campus on Columbia St.

== History ==
"Seagram Stadium" was built for Waterloo College in 1957 with a $250,000 donation from Joseph E. Seagram and Sons Ltd. and additional contributions from Ontario Hydro and the City of Waterloo. It formally opened on May 7, 1958. The Waterloo College Mules played the first football game on October 5 of that year.

Initially owned by Waterloo College, known later as Wilfrid Laurier University, the stadium became part of the University of Waterloo when it split from Waterloo College. The University later sold it to the City of Waterloo on August 12, 1974 for $1 million, after leasing it to the city from 1968 to 1974. At that time, the stadium was in need of extensive repairs. In July 1992, the city sold the facility (once again needing substantial repairs) to Wilfrid Laurier University for one dollar, with an agreement that WLU would invest in upgrading the stadium and make it available to the community. WLU installed the region's first Artificial turf in 1994 at a cost of $1.7 million. The stadium was renamed University Stadium and Sports Centre in March 1995.

In 2007, the stadium underwent a major $5-million renovation which changed the layout; that included replacing the field's playing surface with Fieldturf, overhauling the bleachers, rearranging existing rooms and expansion of the entrance, concession areas and washrooms. The football field was then renamed "Knight–Newbrough Field" (although the name of the field itself has changed, the stadium as a whole retains the name University Stadium.)

The name honours two influential figures in Laurier athletics history, former football head coaches for the Laurier Golden Hawks and UW Warriors Dave "Tuffy" Knight and Rich Newbrough.

University Stadium is located near Waterloo Park on Seagram Drive.

On February 18, 2023, the Golden Hawks football twitter feed announced that the stadium is being demolished, and to stay tuned for further announcements.
