= Twin City Toucans FC =

Twin City Toucans
- Full name: Twin City Toucans Football Club
- Founded: February 16, 2017; 9 years ago
- Stadium: Edible Field, Bryan, Texas
- Capacity: 6,000
- Owner(s): Uri Geva; Chris Clark
- Head coach: Steo Cummins
- League: USL League Two
- Website: tctoucansfc.com
Home colors	Away colors

Twin City Toucans Football Club is an American soccer team based in Bryan, Texas. Founded in 2017, they plays in the USL League Two, the fourth tier of the American Soccer Pyramid.

The team plays its home games at Edible Field, home to the Brazos Valley Bombers of the Texas Collegiate League. The team's colors are black, red, and white. The team serves as a hybrid affiliate of the Houston Dynamo of the Major League Soccer. The hybrid affiliation, a first for the PDL, means that the Dynamo is responsible for the soccer operations of the club, selecting players and coaching staff. The ownership group, Clutch Entertainment, is responsible for day-to-day management.

== History ==
=== Brazos County Cavalry F.C. (2017–2022) ===
==== Formation & 2017 season ====
In January 2017, the Houston Dynamo announced their official affiliation with a brand new Premier Development League (PDL) team that would start play in summer in College Station/Bryan, Texas. They would be owned by the Clutch Entertainment Group who already owned summer collegiate baseball team, Brazos Valley Bombers.

In February 2017, the club name - Brazos Valley Cavalry F.C. - was announced as the result of an online vote. The team's crest and colors were also announced with the crest having two stars representing the two largest communities in the Brazos Valley “Bryan” & “College Station."

On January 16, 2017, James Clarkson was announced as the manager and head coach for the inaugural season. Clarkson had been with the Houston Dynamo for 10 years as the Academy Director and oversaw the creation and development of that program. James Clarkson returned for the 2018 season as manager, supported by Assistant Coach Daniel Roberts.

==== 2019 season ====
In February 2019, Kenny Bundy was announced as the new Head Coach for the 2019 season. This season was the first played as part of the USL League Two, after the PDL was renamed.

==== 2020 season ====
In March 2020, Gareth Glick was announced as head coach. On April 30, it was announced that 2020 Season for USL League Two was cancelled due to the COVID-19 pandemic.

==== 2021 season ====
On November 24, 2020, the club confirmed Gareth Glick was returning as the head coach for the 2021 season, supported by assistant Zane Barnes.

On March 10, 2022, the club announced the promotion of former assistant Sean Pierce as head coach for the upcoming season.

=== Twin City Toucans FC (2023–present) ===
==== 2023 season ====
On May 4, 2023, it was announced the club was being rebranded to Twin City Toucans FC. On May 10, new branding was released centered on bright, tropical colors and a toucan bird. A new crest has a black shield, outlined in bright blue and pink with a toucan bird standing on a soccer ball and the club name displayed in front.

They also introduced a toucan mascot. The team website refers to the mascot as "Nameless Toucan with 6-pack". On May 12, they announced the promotions of former assistant Danny Riley to head coach, and former player Roberto Carlos Hernandez to assistant coach.

==== 2024 season ====
On May 8, Steo Cummins was announced as head coach, Aidan Twohig as assistant, Jarrod Southern as second assistant, and Marco Gonzales as goalkeeper coach.

== Year by year ==
Year	Division	League	Regular season	Playoffs	US Open Cup
Brazos Valley Cavalry FC
2017	4	USL PDL	3rd, Mid South	did not qualify	did not enter
2018	4	USL PDL	1st, Mid South	Conference Semifinals	did not qualify
2019	4	USL League Two	1st, Mid South	Conference Final	1st Round
2020	4	USL League Two	Season cancelled due to COVID-19 pandemic		
2021	4	USL League Two	8th, Mid South	did not qualify	did not qualify
2022	4	USL League Two	1st, Lone Star	Conference Quarterfinals	did not qualify
Twin City Toucans FC
2023	4	USL League Two	2nd, Lone Star	did not qualify	did not qualify
2024	4	USL League Two	3rd, Lone Star	did not qualify	did not qualify
2025	4	USL League Two	6th, Lone Star	did not qualify	did not qualify
2026	4	USL League Two	8th, Lone Star	did not qualify	did not qualify

== Honors ==
- USL PDL Mid South Division Champions 2018
- USL League Two Mid South Division Champions 2019
- USL League Two Lone Star Division Champions 2022

== Notable players ==
This list of notable players comprises players who have gone on to play professional soccer after playing for the team in the Premier Development League, or those who previously played professionally before joining the team.

- (Colombia) Wilmer Cabrera Jr.
- (United States) Zach Jackson
- (United States) Talen Maples
- (United States) Harry Swartz
