= 2022 in American soccer =

Soccer in the United States
- Season: 2022

Men's soccer
- Supporters' Shield: Los Angeles FC
- USL Championship: San Antonio FC
- USL League One: Tormenta FC
- NISA: Michigan Stars FC
- NPSL: FC Motown
- USL League Two: Ventura County Fusion
- MLS Next Pro: Columbus Crew 2
- US Open Cup: Orlando City SC
- MLS Cup: Los Angeles FC

Women's soccer
- NWSL: Portland Thorns FC
- WPSL: California Storm
- UWS: Chicago Mustangs
- USLW: Tormenta FC
- NWSL Challenge Cup: North Carolina Courage

The 2022 season was the 110th season of competitive soccer in the United States.

== National teams ==
=== Men's ===
==== Senior ====
As of December 3, 2022.

Wins	Losses	Draws
6	4	6

===== Friendlies =====
June 1	United States	3–0	Morocco	Cincinnati, Ohio
19:30 ET	Aaronson 26'; Weah 32'; Wright 64' (pen.)	Report		Stadium: TQL Stadium; Attendance: 24,002; Referee: Ismael Cornejo (El Salvador)

June 5	United States	0–0	Uruguay	Kansas City, Kansas
17:00 ET		Report		Stadium: Children's Mercy Park; Attendance: 19,569; Referee: Adonai Escobedo (Mexico)

September 23	Japan	2–0	United States	Düsseldorf, Germany
08:25 ET	Kamada 24'; Mitoma 88'	Report		Stadium: Merkur Spiel-Arena; Attendance: 5,149; Referee: Felix Zwayer (Germany)

September 27	Saudi Arabia	0–0	United States	Murcia, Spain
14:00 ET		Report		Stadium: Estadio Nueva Condomina; Attendance: 364; Referee: Ivan Bebek (Croatia)

===== 2022 FIFA World Cup qualification =====
====== CONCACAF third round ======
Pos	Team	Pld	W	D	L	GF	GA	GD	Pts	Qualification	Canada	Mexico	United States	Costa Rica	Panama	Jamaica	El Salvador	Honduras
1	Canada	14	8	4	2	23	7	+16	28	2022 FIFA World Cup	—	2–1	2–0	1–0	4–1	4–0	3–0	1–1
2	Mexico	14	8	4	2	17	8	+9	28	2022 FIFA World Cup	1–1	—	0–0	0–0	1–0	2–1	2–0	3–0
3	United States	14	7	4	3	21	10	+11	25	2022 FIFA World Cup	1–1	2–0	—	2–1	5–1	2–0	1–0	3–0
4	Costa Rica	14	7	4	3	13	8	+5	25	Inter-confederation play-offs	1–0	0–1	2–0	—	1–0	1–1	2–1	2–1
5	Panama	14	6	3	5	17	19	−2	21		1–0	1–1	1–0	0–0	—	3–2	2–1	1–1
6	Jamaica	14	2	5	7	12	22	−10	11		0–0	1–2	1–1	0–1	0–3	—	1–1	2–1
7	El Salvador	14	2	4	8	8	18	−10	10		0–2	0–2	0–0	1–2	1–0	1–1	—	0–0
8	Honduras	14	0	4	10	7	26	−19	4		0–2	0–1	1–4	0–0	2–3	0–2	0–2	—

Source: FIFA, CONCACAF
Rules for classification: Tiebreakers

January 27	United States	1–0	El Salvador	Columbus, Ohio
19:00 ET	A. Robinson 52'	Report		Stadium: Lower.com Field; Attendance: 20,000; Referee: Bryan López (Guatemala)

January 30	Canada	2–0	United States	Hamilton, Canada
15:00 ET	Larin 7'; Adekugbe 90+5'	Report		Stadium: Tim Hortons Field; Attendance: 12,000; Referee: César Ramos (Mexico)

February 2	United States	3–0	Honduras	Saint Paul, Minnesota
19:30 ET	McKennie 8'; Zimmerman 37'; Pulisic 67'	Report		Stadium: Allianz Field; Attendance: 19,202; Referee: Oshane Nation (Jamaica)

March 24	Mexico	0–0	United States	Mexico City, Mexico
22:00 ET		Report		Stadium: Estadio Azteca; Attendance: 47,000; Referee: Mario Escobar (Guatemala)

March 27	United States	5–1	Panama	Orlando, Florida
19:00 ET	Pulisic 17' (pen.), 45+4' (pen.), 65'; Arriola 23'; Ferreira 27'	Report	Godoy 86'	Stadium: Exploria Stadium; Attendance: 25,022; Referee: Iván Barton (El Salvador)

March 30	Costa Rica	2–0	United States	San José, Costa Rica
21:00 ET	Vargas 51'; Contreras 59'	Report		Stadium: Estadio Nacional; Attendance: 35,000; Referee: Drew Fischer (Canada)

===== CONCACAF Nations League =====
====== Group D ======
Pos	Team	Pld	W	D	L	GF	GA	GD	Pts	Qualification	(United States)	(El Salvador)	(Grenada)
1	United States	4	3	1	0	14	2	+12	10	Qualification for Finals and Gold Cup	—	1–0	5–0
2	El Salvador	4	1	2	1	6	5	+1	5	Qualification for Gold Cup	1–1	—	3–1
3	Grenada	4	0	1	3	4	17	−13	1	Advance to Gold Cup prelims	1–7	2–2	—

Source: CONCACAF

June 10 GS 1	United States	5–0	Grenada	Austin, Texas
22:00 ET	Ferreira 43', 54', 56', 78'; Arriola 62'	Report		Stadium: Q2 Stadium; Attendance: 20,500; Referee: Saíd Martínez (Honduras)

June 14 GS 2	El Salvador	1–1	United States	San Salvador, El Salvador
22:00 ET	Larín 35'	Report	Morris 90+1'	Stadium: Estadio Cuscatlán; Attendance: 6,313; Referee: César Ramos (Mexico)

===== FIFA World Cup =====
====== Group B ======
Pos	Team	Pld	W	D	L	GF	GA	GD	Pts	Qualification
1	England	3	2	1	0	9	2	+7	7	Advance to knockout stage
2	United States	3	1	2	0	2	1	+1	5	Advance to knockout stage
3	Iran	3	1	0	2	4	7	−3	3	
4	Wales	3	0	1	2	1	6	−5	1	

Source: FIFA
Rules for classification: Group stage tiebreakers

November 21	United States	1–1	Wales	Al Rayyan, Qatar
14:00 ET	Weah 36'	Report	Bale 82' (pen.)	Stadium: Ahmad bin Ali Stadium; Attendance: 43,418; Referee: Abdulrahman Al-Jassim (Qatar)

November 25	England	0–0	United States	Al Khor, Qatar
14:00 ET		Report		Stadium: Al Bayt Stadium; Attendance: 68,463; Referee: Jesús Valenzuela (Venezuela)

November 29	Iran	0–1	United States	Doha, Qatar
14:00 ET		Report	Pulisic 38'	Stadium: Al Thumama Stadium; Attendance: 42,127; Referee: Antonio Mateu Lahoz (Spain)

====== Knockout stage ======
December 3 R16	Netherlands	3–1	United States	Al Rayyan, Qatar
10:00 ET	Depay 10'; Blind 45+1'; Dumfries 81'	Report	Wright 76'	Stadium: Khalifa International Stadium; Attendance: 44,846; Referee: Wilton Sampaio (Brazil)

===== Goalscorers =====
Goals are current as of December 3, 2022, after the match against the Netherlands.

Player	Goals
Jesús Ferreira	5
Christian Pulisic	5
Paul Arriola	2
Timothy Weah	2
Haji Wright	2
Brenden Aaronson	1
Weston McKennie	1
Jordan Morris	1
Antonee Robinson	1
Walker Zimmerman	1

==== U–20 ====
===== CONCACAF U-20 Championship =====
Pos	Team	Pld	W	D	L	GF	GA	GD	Pts	Qualification
1	United States	3	2	1	0	15	2	+13	7	Knockout stage
2	Cuba	3	2	0	1	7	3	+4	6	Knockout stage
3	Canada	3	1	1	1	6	3	+3	4	Knockout stage
4	Saint Kitts and Nevis	3	0	0	3	0	20	−20	0	

Source: CONCACAF
Rules for classification: Group stage tiebreakers

====== Group E ======
June 18	United States	10–0	Saint Kitts and Nevis	Tegucigalpa, Honduras
	Cowell 18' (pen.); Clark 32' (pen.); Wolff 44'; Pukštas 45+1'; Cuevas 45+3'; Tsakiris 45+8' (pen.), 70'; Chiuta 48' (o.g.); Aaronson 64', 68'	Report		Stadium: Estadio Nacional; Attendance: 110; Referee: Ricardo Montero (Costa Rica)

June 20	Canada	2–2	United States	Tegucigalpa, Honduras
	Wright 15'; Halliday 69' (o.g.)	Report	McGlynn 53'; Cowell 72'	Stadium: Estadio Nacional; Attendance: 160; Referee: Marco Ortíz (Mexico)

June 22	United States	3–0	Cuba	Tegucigalpa, Honduras
	Sullivan 2', 8', 43'	Report		Stadium: Estadio Nacional; Referee: Selvin Brown (Honduras)

====== Knockout stage ======
June 25 Round of 16	United States	5–0	Nicaragua	Tegucigalpa, Honduras
20:30 ET	Sullivan 45+2', 65'; Luna 56' (pen.); Pineda 73' (o.g.); Neal 87'	Report		Stadium: Estadio Nacional; Attendance: 250; Referee: Keylor Herrera (Costa Rica)

June 28 QF	United States	2–0	Costa Rica	San Pedro Sula, Honduras
	Aaronson 5', 49'	Report		Stadium: Estadio Morazán; Attendance: 500; Referee: Oshane Nation (Jamaica)

July 1 SF	United States	3–0	Honduras	San Pedro Sula, Honduras
	Aaronson 3'; Alvarado Jr. 22'; Sullivan 43'	Report		Stadium: Estadio Morazán; Attendance: 16,500; Referee: Iván Barton (El Salvador)

July 3 F	United States	6–0	Dominican Republic	San Pedro Sula, Honduras
	Wolff 17'; Aaronson 37', 56'; Allen 39'; McGlynn 53'; Tsakiris 61'	Report		Stadium: Estadio Olímpico Metropolitano; Attendance: 100; Referee: Drew Fischer (Canada)

=== Women's ===
==== Senior ====
As of November 13, 2022.

Wins	Losses	Draws
14	3	1

===== Friendlies =====
April 9	United States	9–1	Uzbekistan	Columbus, Ohio
17:30 ET	Sullivan 26'; Pugh 27'; Smith 33', 35', 56'; Macario 46'; Howell 64'; Hatch 86'; Sanchez 90'	Report	Norboeva 70'	Stadium: Lower.com Field; Attendance: 12,071; Referee: Katja Koroleva (United States)

April 12	United States	9–0	Uzbekistan	Chester, Pennsylvania
19:00 ET	Zaripova 1' (o.g.); Macario 12', 45+2'; Pugh 14'; Lavelle 25', 27'; Rodman 71'; Purce 85'; Sanchez 90'	Report		Stadium: Subaru Park; Attendance: 11,373; Referee: Natalie Simon (United States)

June 25	United States	3–0	Colombia	Commerce City, Colorado
19:30 ET	Smith 54', 60'; Kornieck 90+1'	Report		Stadium: Dick's Sporting Goods Park; Attendance: 17,143; Referee: Carly Shaw-Maclaren (Canada)

June 28	United States	2–0	Colombia	Sandy, Utah
22:00 ET	Vanegas 22' (o.g.); O'Hara 77'	Report		Stadium: Rio Tinto Stadium; Attendance: 16,077; Referee: Katja Koroleva (United States)

September 3	United States	4–0	Nigeria	Kansas City, Kansas
13:00 ET	Smith 14', 45+1'; Horan 25'; Morgan 52' (pen.)	Report		Stadium: Children's Mercy Park; Attendance: 14,502; Referee: Melissa Borjas (Honduras)

September 6	United States	2–1	Nigeria	Washington, D.C.
18:00 ET	Demehin 24' (o.g.); Lavelle 66'	Report	Kanu 50'	Stadium: Audi Field; Attendance: 18,869; Referee: Odette Hamilton (Jamaica)

October 7	England	2–1	United States	London, England
15:00 ET	Hemp 10'; Stanway 33' (pen.)	Report	Smith 28'	Stadium: Wembley Stadium; Attendance: 76,893; Referee: Riem Hussein (Germany)

October 11	Spain	2–0	United States	Pamplona, Spain
14:30 ET	Codina 39'; González 72'	Report		Stadium: Estadio El Sadar; Attendance: 11,209; Referee: Deborah Bianchi (Italy)

November 10	United States	1–2	Germany	Fort Lauderdale, Florida
19:00 ET	Rapinoe 85'	Report	Murphy 52' (o.g.); Krumbiegel 89'	Stadium: DRV PNK Stadium; Attendance: 16,917; Referee: Odette Hamilton (Jamaica)

November 13	United States	2–1	Germany	Harrison, New Jersey
17:00 ET	Smith 54'; Pugh 56'	Report	Brand 18'	Stadium: Red Bull Arena; Attendance: 26,317; Referee: Marianela Araya Cruz (Costa Rica)

===== SheBelieves Cup =====
Pos	Team	Pld	W	D	L	GF	GA	GD	Pts
1st place, gold medalist(s)	United States (H)	3	2	1	0	10	0	+10	7
2nd place, silver medalist(s)	Iceland	3	2	0	1	3	6	−3	6
3rd place, bronze medalist(s)	Czech Republic	3	0	2	1	1	2	−1	2
4	New Zealand	3	0	1	2	0	6	−6	1

Source: USSoccer
Rules for classification: 1) points; 2) goal difference; 3) goals scored; 4) head-to-head result; 5) fair play ranking.
(H) Hosts

February 17	United States	0–0	Czech Republic	Carson, California
23:00 ET		Report		Stadium: Dignity Health Sports Park; Attendance: 7,333; Referee: Laura Fortunato (Argentina)

February 20	United States	5–0	New Zealand	Carson, California
15:00 ET	Moore 5', 6', 36' (o.g.); Hatch 51'; Pugh 90+3'	Report		Stadium: Dignity Health Sports Park; Attendance: 16,587; Referee: Maria Belen Carvajal (Chile)

February 23	United States	5–0	Iceland	Frisco, Texas
21:00 ET	Macario 37', 45'; Pugh 60', 75'; K. Mewis 88'	Report		Stadium: Toyota Stadium; Attendance: 7,444; Referee: Edina Alves Batista (Brazil)

===== CONCACAF W Championship =====
====== Group A ======
Pos	Team	Pld	W	D	L	GF	GA	GD	Pts	Qualification
1	United States	3	3	0	0	9	0	+9	9	Qualification for Women's World Cup and advance to knockout stage
2	Jamaica	3	2	0	1	5	5	0	6	Qualification for Women's World Cup and advance to knockout stage
3	Haiti	3	1	0	2	3	7	−4	3	Advance to inter-confederation play-offs
4	Mexico (H)	3	0	0	3	0	5	−5	0	

Source: CONCACAF
Rules for classification: Tiebreakers
(H) Hosts

July 4	United States	3–0	Haiti	San Nicolás de los Garza, Mexico
19:00 ET	Morgan 16', 23'; Purce 84'	Report		Stadium: Estadio Universitario; Attendance: 5,345; Referee: Marie-Soleil Beaudoin (Canada)

July 7	Jamaica	0–5	United States	Guadalupe, Mexico
19:00 ET		Report	Smith 5', 8'; Lavelle 59'; Mewis 83' (pen.); Rodman 86'	Stadium: Estadio BBVA; Attendance: 3,150; Referee: Melissa Borjas (Honduras)

July 11	United States	1–0	Mexico	San Nicolás de los Garza, Mexico
22:00 ET	Mewis 89'	Report		Stadium: Estadio Universitario; Attendance: 20,522; Referee: Myriam Marcotte (Canada)

====== Knockout stage ======
July 14 SF	United States	3–0	Costa Rica	San Nicolás de los Garza, Mexico
22:00 ET	Sonnett 34'; Pugh 45+4'; Sanchez 90+5'	Report		Stadium: Estadio Universitario; Attendance: 2,537; Referee: Astrid Gramajo (Guatemala)

Final

===== Goalscorers =====
Goals are current as of November 13, 2022, after the match against Germany.

Player	Goals
Sophia Smith	11
Mallory Pugh	7
Catarina Macario	5
Rose Lavelle	4
Alex Morgan	4
Kristie Mewis	3
Ashley Sanchez	3
Ashley Hatch	2
Margaret Purce	2
Trinity Rodman	2
Lindsey Horan	1
Jaelin Howell	1
Taylor Kornieck	1
Kelley O'Hara	1
Megan Rapinoe	1
Emily Sonnett	1
Andi Sullivan	1
own goal	6
Total	56

==== U-20 ====
===== 2022 CONCACAF Women's U-20 Championship =====
Pos	Team	Pld	W	D	L	GF	GA	GD	Pts	Qualification
1	United States	3	3	0	0	20	0	+20	9	Knockout stage
2	Puerto Rico	3	2	0	1	4	8	−4	6	Knockout stage
3	Dominican Republic (H)	3	1	0	2	4	11	−7	3	Knockout stage
4	Nicaragua	3	0	0	3	1	10	−9	0	

Source: CONCACAF
Rules for classification: Group stage tiebreakers
(H) Hosts

====== Group E ======
February 25	United States	6–0	Nicaragua	Santo Domingo, Dominican Republic
	Multrie 2'; Cooper 7'; Jackson 17'; Kitahata 51', 64'; McConnell 87'	Report		Stadium: Estadio Olímpico Félix Sánchez; Referee: Carly Shaw-Maclaren (Canada)

February 27	Puerto Rico	0–7	United States	Santo Domingo, Dominican Republic
		Report	Patterson 8', 11', 24', 45+4'; Missimo 58'; Mason 80'; Kitahata 83'	Stadium: Estadio Olímpico Félix Sánchez; Referee: Astrid Gramajo (Guatemala)

March 1	United States	7–0	Dominican Republic	Santo Domingo, Dominican Republic
	Kitahata 33'; Missimo 35', 41'; Marte 47' (o.g.); DellaPeruta 58'; Colton 79'; Jackson 90+2'	Report		Stadium: Estadio Olímpico Félix Sánchez; Referee: Marianela Araya Cruz (Costa Rica)

====== Knockout stage ======
March 4 Round of 16	United States	14–0	Suriname	Santo Domingo, Dominican Republic
	Colton 1', 88'; Kitahata 18' (pen.), 46', 52'; DellaPeruta 24'; Cooper 47', 82', 90'; Thompson 54', 85'; Reale 67' (pen.); Patterson 72'; Mason 80'			Stadium: Estadio Olímpico Félix Sánchez; Referee: Astrid Gramajo (Guatemala)

March 8 Quarter-finals	United States	6–0	Haiti	San Cristóbal, Dominican Republic
	Mason 8'; Thompson 50'; Jackson 68'; DellaPeruta 78' (pen.); Patterson 87'; Cooper 90+4'	Report		Stadium: Estadio Panamericano; Referee: Tatiana Guzmán (Nicaragua)

March 10 Semi-finals	United States	7–0	Puerto Rico	Santo Domingo, Dominican Republic
	DellaPeruta 19'; Moultrie 22'; Cooper 35', 41' (pen.); Jackson 65', 76', 81'	Report		Stadium: Estadio Olímpico Félix Sánchez; Referee: Odette Hamilton (Jamaica)

March 12 Final	United States	2–0	Mexico	Santo Domingo, Dominican Republic
	Cooper 3'; DellaPeruta 42' (pen.)	Report		Stadium: Estadio Olímpico Félix Sánchez; Referee: Marianela Araya (Costa Rica)

===== 2022 Sud Ladies Cup =====
Pos	Team	Pld	W	D	L	GF	GA	GD	Pts
1	United States (C)	3	2	1	0	8	3	+5	8
2	France (H)	3	2	0	1	4	4	0	6
3	Mexico	3	1	0	2	2	5	−3	3
4	Netherlands	3	0	1	2	2	4	−2	1

Source: Sud Ladies Cup
(C) Champions; (H) Hosts

June 24	France	1–3	United States	Aubagne
	Nassi 50'		Jackson 6'; Byars 52', 90'	Stadium: Stade de Lattre-de-Tassigny; Referee: Audrey Gerbel (France)

June 26	United States	3–0	Mexico	Aubagne
	Albert 15'; Byars 80'; Shaw 86'			Stadium: Stade de Lattre-de-Tassigny; Referee: Siham Benmahammed (France)

June 28	United States	2–2 (5–4 p)	Netherlands	Aubagne
	Cooper 5'; Shaw 65'		Noordman 12'; Henry 32'	Stadium: Stade de Lattre-de-Tassigny; Referee: Émeline Rochebilière (France)
	Penalties
	Sentnor (penalty scored); Lageyre (penalty missed); Shaw (penalty scored); Shores (penalty scored); Colton (penalty missed); Patterson (penalty scored); DellaPeruta (penalty scored)		(penalty scored) Foederer; (penalty missed) Peddemors; (penalty missed) Henry; (penalty scored) Auée; (penalty scored) Koopman; (penalty scored) Van Diemen; (penalty missed) Walk

===== 2022 FIFA U-20 Women's World Cup =====
====== Group D ======
Pos	Team	Pld	W	D	L	GF	GA	GD	Pts	Qualification
1	Japan	3	3	0	0	6	1	+5	9	Knockout stage
2	Netherlands	3	2	0	1	7	2	+5	6	Knockout stage
3	United States	3	1	0	2	4	6	−2	3	
4	Ghana	3	0	0	3	1	9	−8	0	

Source: FIFA
Rules for classification: Group stage tiebreakers

August 11	Ghana	0–3	United States	Alajuela, Costa Rica
12:00 ET		Report	Cooper 11'; Thompson 38'; Sentnor 51'	Stadium: Estadio Alejandro Morera Soto; Attendance: 987; Referee: Lara Lee (Australia)

August 14	United States	0–3	Netherlands	San José, Costa Rica
18:00 ET		Report	Koopman 32'; Foederer 55'; Auée 62' (pen.)	Stadium: Estadio Nacional de Costa Rica; Attendance: 2,652; Referee: Kim Yu-jeong (South Korea)

August 17	United States	1–3	Japan	San José, Costa Rica
18:00 ET	Jackson 70'	Report	Matsukubo 55'; Koyama 67'; Tabata 84'	Stadium: Estadio Nacional de Costa Rica; Attendance: 814; Referee: Marta Huerta de Aza (Spain)

==== U-17 ====
===== CONCACAF Women's U-17 Championship =====
Pos	Team	Pld	W	D	L	GF	GA	GD	Pts	Qualification
1	United States	3	3	0	0	38	0	+38	9	Knockout stage
2	Costa Rica	3	2	0	1	13	7	+6	6	Knockout stage
3	Puerto Rico	3	1	0	2	5	17	−12	3	Knockout stage
4	Grenada	3	0	0	3	1	33	−32	0	

Source: CONCACAF
Rules for classification: Group stage tiebreakers

====== Group G ======
April 23	United States	20–0	Grenada	San Cristóbal, Dominican Republic
16:00 ET	Rebimbas 9', 36', 55'; Harvey 12', 26', 30', 59'; Oliaro 16', 61'; Kohler 21', 48', 50', 90+3'; Kiorpes 34'; Williams 43' (o.g.); Roller 64'; Hutton 72', 90+1'; Martinho 76'; Villarreal 81'	Report		Stadium: Estadio Panamericano; Referee: Smeedly Saint-Jean (Haiti)

Aplril 25	Puerto Rico	0–13	United States	San Cristóbal, Dominican Republic
16:00		Report	Martinho 6'; Villarreal 11', 39', 57', 60', 61'; Suarez 21', 67'; Hutton 34', 51', 65'; Kiorpes 69'; Fraser 84'	Stadium: Estadio Panamericano; Referee: Karen Hernandez (Mexico)

April 27	United States	5–0	Costa Rica	Santo Domingo, Dominican Republic
16:00 ET	Villarreal 4'; Kohler 45+1'; Jackson 58' (pen.); Gamero 61'; Hutton 90'	Report		Stadium: Estadio Olímpico Félix Sánchez; Referee: Myriam Marcotte (Canada)

====== Knockout stage ======
April 30 Round of 16	United States	11–0	Curaçao	San Cristóbal, Dominican Republic
	Kiorpes 1', 7', 55' (pen.), 84'; Rebimbas 11'; Martinho 29'; Bhuta 39', 67'; Gamero 41', 73'; Oliaro 58'	Report		Stadium: Estadio Panamericano; Referee: Suleimy Linares Sáez (Cuba)

May 4 QF	United States	4–0	Jamaica	San Cristóbal, Dominican Republic
	Villarreal 3'; Kohler 32'; Jackson 42'; Rebimbas 56'	Report		Stadium: Estadio Panamericano; Referee: Smeedly Saint-Jean (Haiti)

May 6 SF	United States	3–0	Canada	Santo Domingo, Dominican Republic
	Rebimbas 18', 58'; Gamero 78'	Report		Stadium: Estadio Olímpico Félix Sánchez; Referee: Sandra Benítez (El Salvador)

May 8 F	Mexico	1–2	United States	Santo Domingo, Dominican Republic
	Flores 66'	Report	Martinho 20'; Rebimbas 76'	Stadium: Estadio Olímpico Félix Sánchez; Referee: Annays Rosario (Puerto Rico)

===== FIFA U-17 Women's World Cup =====
Pos	Team	Pld	W	D	L	GF	GA	GD	Pts	Qualification
1	United States	3	2	1	0	13	1	+12	7	Knockout stage
2	Brazil	3	2	1	0	7	1	+6	7	Knockout stage
3	Morocco	3	1	0	2	3	5	−2	3	
4	India (H)	3	0	0	3	0	16	−16	0	

Source: FIFA
Rules for classification: Group stage tiebreakers
(H) Hosts

====== Group A ======
October 11	India	0–8	United States	Bhubaneswar, India
10:30 ET		Report	Rebimbas 9', 31'; Kohler 15'; Gamero 23'; Thompson 39'; Emri 51'; Suarez 59' (pen.); Bhuta 62'	Stadium: Kalinga Stadium; Attendance: 4,100; Referee: Susana Corella (Ecuador)

October 14	Brazil	1–1	United States	Bhubaneswar, India
07:00 ET	Carol 37'	Report	Kiorpes 33'	Stadium: Kalinga Stadium; Attendance: 3,639; Referee: Oh Hyeon-jeong (South Korea)

October 17	United States	4–0	Morocco	Margao, India
10:30 ET	Kohler 24', 73'; Smith 68', 81'	Report		Stadium: Pandit Jawaharlal Nehru Stadium; Attendance: 3,578; Referee: Anahí Fernández (Uruguay)

====== Knockout ======
October 21 QF	United States	1–1 (3–4 p)	Nigeria	Navi Mumbai, India
	Villareal 40'	Report	Edafe 26'	Stadium: DY Patil Stadium; Attendance: 6,619; Referee: Iuliana Demetrescu (Romania)
	Penalties
	Jackson (penalty missed); Bhuta (penalty scored); T. Suarez (penalty scored); Emri (penalty missed); Adames (penalty scored)		(penalty scored) Edafe; (penalty missed) Folorunsho; (penalty scored) Usani; (penalty scored) Offiong; (penalty scored) Etim

== Club competitions ==
=== Men's ===
==== League competitions ====
===== Major League Soccer =====
====== Conference tables ======
Eastern Conference

Pos	Team	Pld	W	L	T	GF	GA	GD	Pts	Qualification
1	Philadelphia Union	34	19	5	10	72	26	+46	67	Qualification for the Conference semifinals & 2023 CONCACAF Champions League
2	CF Montréal (Note: Canadian clubs cannot qualify for the 2023 CONCACAF Champions League through the MLS regular season or playoffs.)	34	20	9	5	63	50	+13	65	Qualification for the first round
3	New York City FC	34	16	11	7	57	41	+16	55	Qualification for the first round
4	New York Red Bulls	34	15	11	8	50	41	+9	53	Qualification for the first round
5	FC Cincinnati	34	12	9	13	64	56	+8	49	Qualification for the first round
6	Inter Miami CF	34	14	14	6	47	56	−9	48	Qualification for the first round
7	Orlando City SC	34	14	14	6	44	53	−9	48	Qualification for the first round & 2023 CONCACAF Champions League (Note: as 2022 U.S. Open Cup champions)
8	Columbus Crew	34	10	8	16	46	41	+5	46	
9	Charlotte FC	34	13	18	3	44	52	−8	42	
10	New England Revolution	34	10	12	12	47	50	−3	42	
11	Atlanta United FC	34	10	14	10	48	54	−6	40	
12	Chicago Fire FC	34	10	15	9	39	48	−9	39	
13	Toronto FC	34	9	18	7	49	66	−17	34	
14	D.C. United	34	7	21	6	36	71	−35	27	

Source: MLS
Rules for classification: 1) points; 2) total wins; 3) total goal differential; 4) total goals scored; 5) fewer disciplinary points; 6) away goal differential; 7) away goals scored; 8) home goals differential; 9) home goals scored; 10) coin toss (2 clubs tied) or drawing of lots (≥3 clubs tied)
Notes:

Western Conference

Pos	Team	Pld	W	L	T	GF	GA	GD	Pts	Qualification
1	Los Angeles FC	34	21	9	4	66	38	+28	67	Qualification for the 2023 Campeones Cup, CONCACAF Champions League & conference semifinals
2	Austin FC	34	16	10	8	65	49	+16	56	Qualification for the first round & CONCACAF Champions League
3	FC Dallas	34	14	9	11	48	37	+11	53	Qualification for the first round
4	LA Galaxy	34	14	12	8	58	51	+7	50	Qualification for the first round
5	Nashville SC	34	13	10	11	52	41	+11	50	Qualification for the first round
6	Minnesota United FC	34	14	14	6	48	51	−3	48	Qualification for the first round
7	Real Salt Lake	34	12	11	11	43	45	−2	47	Qualification for the first round
8	Portland Timbers	34	11	10	13	53	53	0	46	
9	Vancouver Whitecaps FC (Note: Canadian clubs cannot qualify for the 2023 CONCACAF Champions League through the MLS regular season or playoffs.)	34	12	15	7	40	57	−17	43	Qualification for the CONCACAF Champions League (Note: as 2022 Canadian Championship winners.)
10	Colorado Rapids	34	11	13	10	46	57	−11	43	
11	Seattle Sounders FC	34	12	17	5	47	46	+1	41	
12	Sporting Kansas City	34	11	16	7	42	54	−12	40	
13	Houston Dynamo FC	34	10	18	6	43	56	−13	36	
14	San Jose Earthquakes	34	8	15	11	52	69	−17	35	

Source: MLS
Rules for classification: 1) points; 2) total wins; 3) total goal differential; 4) total goals scored; 5) fewer disciplinary points; 6) away goal differential; 7) away goals scored; 8) home goals differential; 9) home goals scored; 10) coin toss (2 clubs tied) or drawing of lots (≥3 clubs tied)

====== Overall 2022 table ======
Note: the table below has no impact on playoff qualification and is used solely for determining host of the MLS Cup, certain CCL spots, the Supporters' Shield trophy, seeding in the 2023 Canadian Championship, and 2022 MLS draft. The conference tables are the sole determinant for teams qualifying for the playoffs.

Pos	Team	Pld	W	L	T	GF	GA	GD	Pts	Qualification
1	Los Angeles FC (C, S)	34	21	9	4	66	38	+28	67	Qualification for the 2023 CONCACAF Champions League (Note: As 2022 MLS Cup champions and 2022 MLS Supporters' Shield champions (USA1))
2	Philadelphia Union	34	19	5	10	72	26	+46	67	Qualification for the 2023 CONCACAF Champions League (Note: As 2022 Eastern Conference regular season champions (USA2))
3	CF Montréal (Note: Canadian clubs cannot qualify for the 2023 CONCACAF Champions League through the MLS regular season or playoffs.)	34	20	9	5	63	50	+13	65	
4	Austin FC	34	16	10	8	65	49	+16	56	Qualification for the 2023 CONCACAF Champions League (Note: As highest-ranked U.S. based Division I club (based on 2022 MLS regular season record) not already qualified (USA3))
5	New York City FC	34	16	11	7	57	41	+16	55	
6	New York Red Bulls	34	15	11	8	50	41	+9	53	
7	FC Dallas	34	14	9	11	48	37	+11	53	
8	LA Galaxy	34	14	12	8	58	51	+7	50	
9	Nashville SC	34	13	10	11	52	41	+11	50	
10	FC Cincinnati	34	12	9	13	64	56	+8	49	
11	Minnesota United FC	34	14	14	6	48	51	−3	48	
12	Inter Miami CF	34	14	14	6	47	56	−9	48	
13	Orlando City SC (U)	34	14	14	6	44	53	−9	48	Qualification for the 2023 CONCACAF Champions League (Note: As 2022 U.S. Open Cup champions (USA4))
14	Real Salt Lake	34	12	11	11	43	45	−2	47	
15	Portland Timbers	34	11	10	13	53	53	0	46	
16	Columbus Crew	34	10	8	16	46	41	+5	46	
17	Vancouver Whitecaps FC (V)	34	12	15	7	40	57	−17	43	Qualification for the 2023 CONCACAF Champions League (Note: As 2022 Canadian Championship winners (CAN1))
18	Colorado Rapids	34	11	13	10	46	57	−11	43	
19	Charlotte FC	34	13	18	3	44	52	−8	42	
20	New England Revolution	34	10	12	12	47	50	−3	42	
21	Seattle Sounders FC	34	12	17	5	47	46	+1	41	
22	Sporting Kansas City	34	11	16	7	42	54	−12	40	
23	Atlanta United FC	34	10	14	10	48	54	−6	40	
24	Chicago Fire FC	34	10	15	9	39	48	−9	39	
25	Houston Dynamo FC	34	10	18	6	43	56	−13	36	
26	San Jose Earthquakes	34	8	15	11	52	69	−17	35	
27	Toronto FC	34	9	18	7	49	66	−17	34	
28	D.C. United	34	7	21	6	36	71	−35	27	

Source: MLS
Rules for classification: 1) points; 2) total wins; 3) total goal differential; 4) total goals scored; 5) fewer disciplinary points; 6) away goal differential; 7) away goals scored; 8) home goals differential; 9) home goals scored; 10) coin toss (2 clubs tied) or drawing of lots (≥3 clubs tied)
(C) Champions; (S) Supporters' Shield winners; (U) U.S. Open Cup winners; (V) Canadian Championship winners

====== MLS Playoffs ======
Bracket

First round October 15–17	Conference semifinals October 20, 23
E1	Philadelphia Union	1
E5	FC Cincinnati	0
E4	New York Red Bulls	1
E5	FC Cincinnati	2
Eastern Conference
E3	New York City FC	3
E6	Inter Miami CF	0
E3	New York City FC	3
E2	CF Montréal	1
E2	CF Montréal	2
E7	Orlando City SC	0
W1	Los Angeles FC	3
W4	LA Galaxy	2
W4	LA Galaxy	1
W5	Nashville SC	0
Western Conference
W3	FC Dallas (p)	1 (5)
W6	Minnesota United FC	1 (4)
W3	FC Dallas	1
W2	Austin FC	2
W2	Austin FC (p)	2 (3)
W7	Real Salt Lake	2 (1)

Conference finals October 30
E1	Philadelphia Union	3
E3	New York City FC	1
W1	Los Angeles FC	3
W2	Austin FC	0

MLS Cup; November 5
E1	Philadelphia Union	3 (0)
W1	Los Angeles FC (p)	3 (3)

Note: The higher seeded teams hosted matches, with the MLS Cup host determined by overall points.

====== MLS Cup ======
November 5, 2022
1:00 p.m. PDT

Los Angeles FC	3–3 (a.e.t.)	Philadelphia Union
Acosta 28'; Murillo 83'; Bale 120+8'	Report	Gazdag 59'; Elliott 85', 120+4'
Penalties
Tello (penalty missed); Bouanga (penalty scored); Hollingshead (penalty scored); Ilie (penalty scored)	3–0	(penalty missed) Gazdag; (penalty missed) Martínez; (penalty missed) Wagner

Banc of California Stadium, Los Angeles, California
Attendance: 22,384
Referee: Ismail Elfath

====== MLS All-Star Game ======
2022 MLS All-Star Game
August 10, 2022
19:30 CDT (20:30 EDT)

MLS All-Stars (United States) (Canada)	2–1	(Mexico) Liga MX All-Stars
Vela 3'; Ruidíaz 73' (pen.)	Report	Álvarez 83'

Allianz Field, Saint Paul, Minnesota
Attendance: 19,727
Referee: Joe Dickerson

===== USL Championship =====
====== Conference tables ======
Eastern Conference

Pos	Team	Pld	W	L	T	GF	GA	GD	Pts	Qualification
1	Louisville City FC	34	22	6	6	65	28	+37	72	Qualification for the Conference Semifinals
2	Memphis 901 FC	34	21	8	5	67	33	+34	68	Playoffs
3	Tampa Bay Rowdies	34	20	7	7	73	33	+40	67	Playoffs
4	Birmingham Legion FC	34	17	10	7	56	37	+19	58	Playoffs
5	Pittsburgh Riverhounds SC	34	16	9	9	50	38	+12	57	Playoffs
6	Miami FC	34	15	9	10	47	32	+15	55	Playoffs
7	Detroit City FC	34	14	8	12	44	30	+14	54	Playoffs
8	FC Tulsa	34	12	16	6	48	58	−10	42	
9	Indy Eleven	34	12	17	5	41	55	−14	41	
10	Hartford Athletic	34	10	18	6	47	57	−10	36	
11	Loudoun United FC	34	8	22	4	36	74	−38	28	
12	Charleston Battery	34	6	21	7	41	77	−36	25	
13	Atlanta United 2	34	6	23	5	39	85	−46	23	
14	New York Red Bulls II	34	3	25	6	24	76	−52	15	

Source: USL Championship Standings
Rules for classification: 1) head-to-head points; 2) head-to-head goal differential; 3) points-per game within conference; 4) total wins; 5) total goal differential; 6) total goals scored; 7) points earned against top four Conference finishers; 8) disciplinary points; 9) coin toss or drawing of lots

Western Conference

Pos	Team	Pld	W	L	T	GF	GA	GD	Pts	Qualification
1	San Antonio FC (C, X)	34	24	5	5	54	26	+28	77	Qualification for the Conference Semifinals
2	San Diego Loyal SC	34	18	10	6	68	55	+13	60	Playoffs
3	Colorado Springs Switchbacks	34	17	13	4	59	53	+6	55	Playoffs
4	Sacramento Republic	34	15	11	8	48	34	+14	53	Playoffs
5	New Mexico United	34	13	9	12	49	40	+9	51	Playoffs
6	Rio Grande Valley Toros	34	14	13	7	51	40	+11	49	Playoffs
7	Oakland Roots SC	34	11	10	13	51	46	+5	46	Playoffs
8	El Paso Locomotive FC	34	13	14	7	56	52	+4	46	
9	Las Vegas Lights FC	34	12	13	9	40	50	−10	45	
10	Phoenix Rising FC	34	12	16	6	50	58	−8	42	
11	LA Galaxy II	34	11	16	7	53	63	−10	40	
12	Monterey Bay FC	34	12	18	4	42	59	−17	40	
13	Orange County SC	34	7	14	13	49	59	−10	34	

Source: USL Championship Standings
Rules for classification: 1) head-to-head points; 2) head-to-head goal differential; 3) points-per game within conference; 4) total wins; 5) total goal differential; 6) total goals scored; 7) points earned against top four Conference finishers; 8) disciplinary points; 9) coin toss or drawing of lots
(C) Champions; (X) Regular Season League Champion

====== USL Championship Playoffs ======
Bracket

Conference Quarterfinals; October 22–23	Conference Semifinals; October 28–30
E1	Louisville City FC (p)	2 (5)
E5	Pittsburgh Riverhounds SC	2 (3)
E4	Birmingham Legion FC	2 (7)
E5	Pittsburgh Riverhounds SC (p)	2 (8)
Eastern Conference
E2	Memphis 901 FC	3
E7	Detroit City FC	1
E2	Memphis 901 FC	0
E3	Tampa Bay Rowdies	1
E3	Tampa Bay Rowdies	3
E6	Miami FC	1
W1	San Antonio FC	3
W7	Oakland Roots SC	0
W2	San Diego Loyal SC	0
W7	Oakland Roots SC	3
Western Conference
W3	Colorado Springs Switchbacks FC	3
W6	Rio Grande Valley FC	0
W3	Colorado Springs Switchbacks FC (a.e.t.)	2
W4	Sacramento Republic FC	1
W4	Sacramento Republic FC	2
W5	New Mexico United	0

Conference Finals; November 5–6
E1	Louisville City FC (a.e.t.)	1
E3	Tampa Bay Rowdies	0
W1	San Antonio FC	2
W3	Colorado Springs Switchbacks FC	0

USL Championship Final; November 13
E1	Louisville City FC	1
W1	San Antonio FC	3

====== USL Championship Final ======
November 13, 2022
7:30 PM CST

San Antonio FC	3–1	Louisville City FC
Patiño 45+3' (pen.), 70'; Adeniran 64'	Report	Ownby 78'

Toyota Field, San Antonio, Texas
Attendance: 8,534
Referee: Elvis Osmanovic

===== USL League One =====
Pos	Team	Pld	W	L	T	GF	GA	GD	Pts	Qualification
1	Richmond Kickers (X)	30	14	7	9	54	35	+19	51	Qualification for the semi-finals
2	Greenville Triumph SC	30	12	8	10	40	38	+2	46	Qualification for the semi-finals
3	Tormenta FC (C)	30	12	9	9	42	40	+2	45	Qualification for the play-offs
4	Chattanooga Red Wolves SC	30	12	11	7	52	39	+13	43	Qualification for the play-offs
5	Union Omaha	30	10	7	13	34	33	+1	43	Qualification for the play-offs
6	Charlotte Independence	30	12	12	6	48	48	0	42	Qualification for the play-offs
7	Northern Colorado Hailstorm FC	30	11	10	9	42	38	+4	42	
8	Central Valley Fuego FC	30	11	12	7	37	40	−3	40	
9	Forward Madison FC	30	7	11	12	34	44	−10	33	
10	FC Tucson	30	8	14	8	34	44	−10	32	
11	North Carolina FC	30	8	16	6	35	53	−18	30	

Source: USL League One
Rules for classification: 1) points; 2) total wins; 3) total goal differential; 4) total goals scored; 5) points earned against top four Conference finishers; 6) disciplinary points; 7) drawing of lots.
(C) Champions; (X) Regular Season Champion

====== Playoffs ======
Quarter-finals
4	Chattanooga Red Wolves SC (a.e.t.)	1
5	Union Omaha	0
3	Tormenta FC	2
6	Charlotte Independence	1

Semi-finals
1	Richmond Kickers	0
4	Chattanooga Red Wolves SC	1
2	Greenville Triumph SC	0
3	Tormenta FC	1

Final
3	Tormenta FC	2
4	Chattanooga Red Wolves SC	1

====== USL League One Final ======
November 6, 2022
7:30 PM EST

Tormenta FC	2–1	Chattanooga Red Wolves SC
Sterling 35' (pen.); Roberts 82'	Report	Tejera 45+3'

Optim Sports Medicine Field, Statesboro, Georgia
Attendance: 3,045
Referee: Elvis Osmanovic

===== USL League Two =====
====== USL League Two Playoffs ======
Conference Quarterfinals	Conference Semifinals
E1	Lionsbridge FC	1
E8	Vermont Green FC	2
E8	Vermont Green FC	1
E5	Long Island Rough Riders	2
E4	Ocean City Nor'easters	1
E5	Long Island Rough Riders	3
Eastern Conference
E2	Seacoast United Phantoms	4
E7	Christos FC	1
E2	Seacoast United Phantoms (a.e.t.)	1
E6	Western Mass Pioneers	0
E3	Manhattan SC	0
E6	Western Mass Pioneers	1
S2	North Carolina Fusion U23 (p)	1 (5)
S7	The Villages SC	1 (4)
S2	North Carolina Fusion U23	2
S6	Asheville City SC	1
S3	Brazos Valley Cavalry FC	0
S6	Asheville City SC	3
Southern Conference
S1	NONA FC	1
S8	West Virginia United	2
S8	West Virginia United	0
S4	One Knoxville SC	2
S4	One Knoxville SC (a.e.t.)	4
S5	Texas United	2
C1	Des Moines Menace	4
C6	Kaw Valley FC	0
C1	Des Moines Menace	4
C5	Kings Hammer FC	1
C5	Kings Hammer FC (p)	2 (6)
C4	Kalamazoo FC	2 (5)
Central Conference
C2	Chicago FC United	3
C8	Peoria City	1
C2	Chicago FC United	1
C7	Flint City Bucks	2
C3	South Bend Lions	1
C7	Flint City Bucks	3
W1	Capital FC	2
W8	San Francisco Glens	3
W8	San Francisco Glens	2
W4	Ballard FC (a.e.t.)	3
W4	Ballard FC	2
W3	Project 51O	1
Western Conference
W5	Ventura County Fusion	3
W6	Flatirons Rush SC	2
W5	Ventura County Fusion	2
W7	Southern California Seahorses	1
W2	Park City Red Wolves	1
W7	Southern California Seahorses	3

Conference Finals
E5	Long Island Rough Riders (a.e.t.)	2
E2	Seacoast United Phantoms	1
S2	North Carolina Fusion U23	2
S4	One Knoxville SC	1
C1	Des Moines Menace	1 (4)
C7	Flint City Bucks (p)	1 (5)
W4	Ballard FC	0
W5	Ventura County Fusion	1

National Semifinals
E5	Long Island Rough Riders	2
S2	North Carolina Fusion U23	0
C7	Flint City Bucks	0
W5	Ventura County Fusion	1

National Final
E5	Long Island Rough Riders	1
W5	Ventura County Fusion	2

=== Semifinals ===
July 31, 2022 National Semifinal	Ventura County Fusion	1–0	Flint City Bucks	Valley Stadium; West Des Moines, Iowa
7:15 PM CDT	Opoku 40'; Oberli (yellow card); Madrigal (yellow card)	Report	Dallmann (yellow card) 42'; Slade (yellow card) 56'; Eneli (yellow card); Quaynor (yellow card); Cekrezi (yellow card); Hepburn (yellow card)

August 1, 2022 National Semifinal	North Carolina Fusion U23	0–2	Long Island Rough Riders	Austin-East Magnet High School; Knoxville, Tennessee
10:00 AM EDT	Pellio (yellow card); Duval (yellow card)	Report	Vowinkel 45'; Thiesen 52'; Petridis (yellow card)

=== USL League Two Championship Game ===
August 6, 2022
7:00 PM PDT
National Final

Ventura County Fusion	2–1	Long Island Rough Riders
Villapando (yellow card); Opoku 60'; Edwards 84'	Report	Cavallo (yellow card) 49'; Weiss 55'; Puig (yellow card); DiLuzio (yellow card) 68'

Ventura College Sportsplex
Ventura, California
Referee: Trevor Wiseman

===== National Independent Soccer Association =====
====== East Division ======
Pos	Team	Pld	W	D	L	GF	GA	GD	Pts	Qualification
1	Chattanooga FC	16	9	4	3	30	12	+18	31	Qualification for the semi-finals
2	Michigan Stars FC	15	6	6	3	18	9	+9	24	Qualification for the play-offs
3	Maryland Bobcats FC	15	6	3	6	24	19	+5	21	Qualification for the play-offs
4	Syracuse Pulse	16	5	2	9	18	23	−5	17	
5	Flower City Union	19	2	2	15	10	50	−40	8	

Updated to match(es) played on August 20, 2022. Source: nisasoccer.com
Rules for classification: 1) points; 2) goal differential; 3) goals scored; 4) head-to-head

====== West Division ======
Pos	Team	Pld	W	D	L	GF	GA	GD	Pts	Qualification
1	California United Strikers FC	14	11	2	1	24	6	+18	35	Qualification for the semi-finals
2	Albion San Diego	10	4	4	2	14	12	+2	16	Qualification for the play-offs
3	Bay Cities FC	12	4	3	5	18	18	0	15	Qualification for the play-offs
4	Los Angeles Force	11	2	4	5	7	14	−7	10	
5	Valley United FC (Note: Valley United FC withdrew from the league and their playing record of P9 W1 D1 L7 GF4 GA21 was expunged.)	0	0	0	0	0	0	0	0	Withdrew from the league

Updated to match(es) played on August 20, 2022. Source: nisasoccer.com
Rules for classification: 1) points; 2) goal differential; 3) goals scored; 4) head-to-head

====== Final Standings (Following August 27 Re-alignment) ======
Pos	Team	Pld	W	D	L	GF	GA	GD	Pts	PPG	Qualification
1	California United Strikers FC	21	14	4	3	35	12	+23	46	2.19	Qualification for the semi-finals
2	Chattanooga FC	24	14	7	3	44	21	+23	49	2.04	Qualification for the semi-finals
3	Michigan Stars FC	23	10	8	5	27	15	+12	38	1.65	Qualification for the play-offs
4	Albion San Diego	20	9	5	6	28	23	+5	32	1.60	Qualification for the play-offs
5	Maryland Bobcats FC	23	8	6	9	32	28	+4	30	1.30	Qualification for the play-offs
6	Syracuse Pulse	22	7	4	11	26	32	−6	25	1.14	Qualification for the play-offs
7	Los Angeles Force	20	2	8	10	14	31	−17	14	0.70	
8	Flower City Union	23	2	3	18	13	57	−44	9	0.39	

Source: nisasoccer.com
Rules for classification: 1) points; 2) goal differential; 3) goals scored; 4) head-to-head

====== Playoffs ======
Quarterfinal; October 21 (Eleven Sports)
3	Michigan Stars FC	2
6	Syracuse Pulse	0

Quarterfinal; October 21 (Eleven Sports)
4	Albion San Diego	2
5	Maryland Bobcats FC	0

Semifinals; October 29/30 (Eleven Sports)
1	California United Strikers FC	2
4	Albion San Diego	4
2	Chattanooga FC	0
3	Michigan Stars FC	1

NISA Championship Final; November 5 (Eleven Sports)
4	Albion San Diego	0
3	Michigan Stars FC	1

====== 2022 NISA Championship Final ======
November 6
4:00 p.m. EDT

Michigan Stars FC	1–0	Albion San Diego
Anthony Bowie 31'	Report; Broadcast

Romeo Stadium, Washington, Michigan
Attendance: 1,178
Referee: Alex Beehler

===== MLS Next Pro =====
====== Eastern Conference ======
Pos	Div	Team	Pld	W	SOW	SOL	L	GF	GA	GD	Pts	Qualification
1	CT	Columbus Crew 2	24	16	2	3	3	62	22	+40	55	Qualification for the 2022 MLS Next Pro Playoffs
2	NE	Toronto FC II	24	12	2	1	9	44	38	+6	41	Qualification for the 2022 MLS Next Pro Playoffs
3	NE	Philadelphia Union II	24	11	3	1	9	42	39	+3	40	Qualification for the 2022 MLS Next Pro Playoffs
4	NE	Rochester New York FC	24	10	4	2	8	37	30	+7	40	Qualification for the 2022 MLS Next Pro Playoffs
5	NE	New York City FC II	24	9	4	2	9	49	35	+14	37	
6	CT	Inter Miami CF II	24	10	1	4	9	40	49	−9	36	
7	NE	New England Revolution II	24	9	1	4	10	27	42	−15	33	
8	CT	Chicago Fire FC II	24	8	2	3	11	41	44	−3	31	
9	CT	Orlando City B	24	6	2	3	13	40	53	−13	25	
10	CT	FC Cincinnati 2	24	4	2	1	17	27	65	−38	17	

Source: MLSNP Eastern Conference
Rules for classification: 1) points; 2) total wins; 3) total goal differential; 4) total goals scored; 5) fewer disciplinary points; 6) away goal differential; 7) away goals scored; 8) home goals differential; 9) home goals scored; 10) coin toss (2 clubs tied) or drawing of lots (≥3 clubs tied)

====== Western Conference ======
Pos	Div	Team	Pld	W	SOW	SOL	L	GF	GA	GD	Pts	Qualification
1	FR	St. Louis City 2	24	15	1	2	6	51	34	+17	49	Qualification for the 2022 MLS Next Pro Playoffs
2	PC	Tacoma Defiance	24	14	3	1	6	57	25	+32	49	Qualification for the 2022 MLS Next Pro Playoffs
3	FR	Houston Dynamo 2	24	14	2	3	5	38	22	+16	49	Qualification for the 2022 MLS Next Pro Playoffs
4	FR	North Texas SC	24	13	2	3	6	48	31	+17	46	Qualification for the 2022 MLS Next Pro Playoffs
5	PC	San Jose Earthquakes II	24	12	1	3	8	48	37	+11	41	
6	FR	Minnesota United FC 2	24	9	4	1	10	43	39	+4	36	
7	PC	Whitecaps FC 2	24	7	3	5	9	40	40	0	32	
8	FR	Sporting Kansas City II	24	9	1	2	12	31	38	−7	31	
9	FR	Colorado Rapids 2	24	7	4	2	11	33	56	−23	31	
10	PC	Real Monarchs	24	6	1	3	14	28	50	−22	23	
11	PC	Portland Timbers 2	24	2	4	0	18	29	66	−37	14	

Source: MLSNP Western Conference
Rules for classification: 1) points; 2) total wins; 3) total goal differential; 4) total goals scored; 5) fewer disciplinary points; 6) away goal differential; 7) away goals scored; 8) home goals differential; 9) home goals scored; 10) coin toss (2 clubs tied) or drawing of lots (≥3 clubs tied)

====== Overall table ======
Pos	Team	Pld	W	SOW	SOL	L	GF	GA	GD	Pts	Qualification
1	Columbus Crew 2	24	16	2	3	3	62	22	+40	55	Regular season champion
2	St. Louis City 2	24	15	1	2	6	51	34	+17	49	
3	Tacoma Defiance	24	14	3	1	6	57	25	+32	49	
4	Houston Dynamo 2	24	14	2	3	5	38	22	+16	49	
5	North Texas SC	24	13	2	3	6	48	31	+17	46	
6	San Jose Earthquakes II	24	12	1	3	8	48	37	+11	41	
7	Toronto FC II	24	12	2	1	9	44	38	+6	41	
8	Philadelphia Union II	24	11	3	1	9	42	39	+3	40	
9	Rochester New York FC	24	10	4	2	8	37	30	+7	40	
10	New York City FC II	24	9	4	2	9	49	35	+14	37	
11	Inter Miami CF II	24	10	1	4	9	40	49	−9	36	
12	Minnesota United FC 2	24	9	4	1	10	43	39	+4	36	
13	New England Revolution II	24	9	1	4	10	27	42	−15	33	
14	Whitecaps FC 2	24	7	3	5	9	40	40	0	32	
15	Sporting Kansas City II	24	9	1	2	12	31	38	−7	31	
16	Chicago Fire FC II	24	8	2	3	11	41	44	−3	31	
17	Colorado Rapids 2	24	7	4	2	11	33	56	−23	31	
18	Orlando City B	24	6	2	3	13	40	53	−13	25	
19	Real Monarchs	24	6	1	3	14	28	50	−22	23	
20	FC Cincinnati 2	24	4	2	1	17	27	65	−38	17	
21	Portland Timbers 2	24	2	4	0	18	29	66	−37	14	

Source: MLSNP
Rules for classification: 1) points; 2) total wins; 3) total goal differential; 4) total goals scored; 5) fewer disciplinary points; 6) away goal differential; 7) away goals scored; 8) home goals differential; 9) home goals scored; 10) coin toss (2 clubs tied) or drawing of lots (≥3 clubs tied)

====== Playoffs ======
Conference Semifinals
E1	Columbus Crew 2	4
E4	Rochester New York FC	1
Eastern Conference
E2	Toronto FC II	1
E3	Philadelphia Union II	0
W1	St. Louis City SC 2	2
W4	North Texas SC	0
Western Conference
W2	Tacoma Defiance (p)	2 (5)
W3	Houston Dynamo 2	2 (4)

Conference Finals
E1	Columbus Crew 2 (a.e.t.)	4
E2	Toronto FC II	3
W1	St. Louis City SC 2	2
W2	Tacoma Defiance	1

2022 MLS Next Pro Final
E1	Columbus Crew 2	4
W1	St. Louis City SC 2	1

====== 2022 MLS Next Pro Cup ======
October 8
1:30 PM EDT

Columbus Crew 2	4–1	St. Louis City 2
Malou (yellow card) 41'; Parente 45' (pen.); Micaletto 45+3'; Russell-Rowe 58' (pen.); Telfer 83'	Report	Pompeu 80'; Yaro (yellow card) 89'

Lower.com Field, Columbus, Ohio
Attendance: 7,446
Referee: Malik Badawi

==== Cup competitions ====
===== US Open Cup =====
====== Final ======
September 7, 2022
8:00 pm EDT

Orlando City SC (MLS)	3–0	Sacramento Republic FC (USLC)
Torres 75', 80' (pen.); Michel 90+6'	Report

Exploria Stadium, Orlando, Florida
Attendance: 25,527
Referee: Ramy Touchan

==== International competitions ====
===== CONCACAF competitions =====
====== CONCACAF Champions League ======
Club	Competition	Final round
Colorado Rapids	2022 CONCACAF Champions League	Round of 16
New England Revolution	2022 CONCACAF Champions League	Quarter-finals
Seattle Sounders FC	2022 CONCACAF Champions League	Winner
New York City FC	2022 CONCACAF Champions League	Semi-finals

Round of 16

Team 1	Agg.	Team 2	1st leg	2nd leg
Motagua (Honduras)	0–5	(United States) Seattle Sounders FC	0–0	0–5
Comunicaciones (Guatemala)	1–1 (4–3 p)	(United States) Colorado Rapids	1–0	0–1
Santos de Guápiles (Costa Rica)	0–6	(United States) New York City FC	0–2	0–4
Cavaly (Haiti)	0–3	(United States) New England Revolution	0–3 w/o	Cancelled

Quarter-finals

Team 1	Agg.	Team 2	1st leg	2nd leg
Seattle Sounders FC (United States)	4–1	(Mexico) León	3–0	1–1
New York City FC (United States)	5–5 (a)	(Guatemala) Comunicaciones	3–1	2–4
New England Revolution (United States)	3–3 (3–4 p)	(Mexico) UNAM	3–0	0–3

Semi-finals

Team 1	Agg.	Team 2	1st leg	2nd leg
Seattle Sounders FC (United States)	4–2	(United States) New York City FC	3–1	1–1

Finals

Team 1	Agg.	Team 2	1st leg	2nd leg
UNAM (Mexico)	2–5	(United States) Seattle Sounders FC	2–2	0–3

====== Leagues Cup Showcase ======
August 3
5:30 PM PT

LA Galaxy (United States)	2–0	(Mexico) Guadalajara
Joveljić 28'; Coulibaly (yellow card) 38'; Kljestan (yellow card) 57'; Perez 62'	Report	Briseño (yellow card) 56'

SoFi Stadium, Inglewood, California
Attendance: 71,189
Referee: Luis Enrique Santander (Mexico)

August 3
8:15 PM PT

Los Angeles FC (United States)	0–0	(Mexico) América
Fall (yellow card) 43'; Escobar (yellow card) 76'	Report
Penalties
Palacios (penalty missed); Vela (penalty scored); Jennings (penalty scored); Sánchez (penalty scored); Bale (penalty scored); Escobar (penalty scored); Cifuentes (penalty missed)	5–6	(penalty scored) Valdez; (penalty scored) Martín; (penalty missed) Zendejas; (penalty scored) Campos; (penalty scored) Rodríguez; (penalty scored) Cáceres; (penalty scored) Lara

SoFi Stadium, Inglewood, California
Attendance: 71,189
Referee: Victor Rivas (United States)

September 21
7:00PM EDT

FC Cincinnati (United States)	3–1	(Mexico) Guadalajara
Kubo 53'; Murphy (yellow card) 59'; Harris 69'; Vazquez 77'	Report	Pérez 20'; Martínez (yellow card) 43'; Sepúlveda (yellow card) 67'

TQL Stadium, Cincinnati, Ohio
Attendance: 14,727
Referee: Armando Villarreal (United States)

September 21
21:00 EDT

Nashville SC (United States)	3–3	(Mexico) Club América
	Report
Penalties
	4–2

Geodis Park, Nashville, Tennessee
Referee: César Arturo Ramos (Mexico)

September 22
22:00 EDT

Real Salt Lake (United States)	1–2	(Mexico) Atlas
Herrera 17'; Meram (red card) 36'; Gomez (yellow card) 52'; Caldwell (yellow card) 84'; Nigro (yellow card) 88'	Report	Zaldívar 41', (yellow card) 64'; Aguirre (yellow card) 48'; Rodríguez 71'; Reyes (yellow card) 78'; Ortega (yellow card) 90+3'

America First Field, Sandy, Utah
Referee: Joseph Dickerson (United States)

====== Campeones Cup ======
New York City FC will host the match on September 14, 2022, at Yankee Stadium.

September 14, 2022
19:30 EDT (UTC−04:00)

New York City FC (United States)	2–0	(Mexico) Atlas
Callens 4'; Moralez 49'	Report

Yankee Stadium, New York, New York
Attendance: 24,823
Referee: Saíd Martínez (Honduras)

=== Women's ===
==== League competitions ====
===== National Women's Soccer League =====
====== Regular season ======
Pos	Team	Pld	W	D	L	GF	GA	GD	Pts	Qualification
1	OL Reign	22	11	7	4	32	19	+13	40	NWSL Shield, Playoffs – semi-finals
2	Portland Thorns FC (C)	22	10	9	3	49	24	+25	39	Playoffs – semi-finals
3	San Diego Wave FC	22	10	6	6	32	21	+11	36	Playoffs – first round
4	Houston Dash	22	10	6	6	35	27	+8	36	Playoffs – first round
5	Kansas City Current	22	10	6	6	29	29	0	36	Playoffs – first round
6	Chicago Red Stars	22	9	6	7	34	28	+6	33	Playoffs – first round
7	North Carolina Courage	22	9	5	8	46	33	+13	32	
8	Angel City FC	22	8	5	9	23	27	−4	29	
9	Racing Louisville FC	22	5	8	9	23	35	−12	23	
10	Orlando Pride	22	5	7	10	22	45	−23	22	
11	Washington Spirit	22	3	10	9	26	33	−7	19	
12	NJ/NY Gotham FC	22	4	1	17	16	46	−30	13	

Source: NWSL
Rules for classification: Tiebreakers
(C) Champions

====== Playoffs ======
First round
4	Houston Dash	1
5	Kansas City Current	2
3	San Diego Wave FC (a.e.t.)	2
6	Chicago Red Stars	1

Semi-finals
1	OL Reign	0
5	Kansas City Current	2
2	Portland Thorns FC	2
3	San Diego Wave FC	1

Championship
5	Kansas City Current	0
2	Portland Thorns FC	2

Championship

October 29, 2022
20:00 EDT

Portland Thorns FC	2–0	Kansas City Current
Smith 4'; Merrick 56' (o.g.)	Report

Audi Field, Washington, D.C.
Attendance: 17,624
Referee: Natalie Simon

===== United Women's Soccer =====
Playoffs

Division Championship
MW1	Chicago Mustangs	3
MW2	St. Louis Scott Gallagher	1
GL1	Corktown AFC Hearts	4
GL2	Nationals FC	1

Conference Semifinals
MW1	Chicago Mustangs	4
GL1	Corktown AFC Hearts	3
NE1	New England Mutiny	1
PNY1	FC Buffalo	2
MA1	Coppermine United	1
NE2	Connecticut Fusion	0

Conference Finals
MW1	Chicago Mustangs	3
HL1	KC Courage	0
SW2	San Antonio Athenians SC	w/o (Note: The conference championship match between the southeast and southwest divisions was cancelled with Atlanta Panthers' inability to play past the regular season due to a roster shortage)
SE1	Atlanta Panthers SC
PNY1	FC Buffalo	3
MA1	Coppermine United	2

National Semifinals
MW1	Chicago Mustangs	1
SW2	San Antonio Athenians SC	0
PNY1	FC Buffalo	1
W1	Calgary Foothills WFC	4

National Final
MW1	Chicago Mustangs	2
W1	Calgary Foothills WFC	1

===== USL W League =====
The USL W League played its first season in 2022.

Playoffs

Quarterfinals
Morris Elite SC	0
McLean Soccer	8
Minnesota Aurora FC	2
Indy Eleven	1
FC Miami City	0
Tormenta FC	1
Greenville Liberty SC	2
Long Island Rough Riders	0

Semifinals
McLean Soccer	0
Minnesota Aurora FC	1
Tormenta FC	4
Greenville Liberty SC	1

Final
Minnesota Aurora FC	1
Tormenta FC (a.e.t.)	2

Championship

July 23
4:30 PM CDT

Minnesota Aurora FC	1–2 (a.e.t.)	Tormenta FC
Addy Symonds 22'	Report	Jaida Nyby 6', 115'

TCO Stadium
Eagan, Minnesota
Attendance: 6,489

==== Cup competitions ====
===== NWSL Challenge Cup =====
====== Group ======
East Division

Pos	Team	Pld	W	T	L	GF	GA	GD	Pts	Qualification	NC	WAS	NJY	ORL
1	North Carolina Courage	6	3	3	0	12	7	+5	12	Advance to knockout stage	—	2–2	2–0	1–0
2	Washington Spirit	6	2	4	0	12	7	+5	10	Advance to knockout stage based on ranking	2–2	—	1–1	4–1
3	NJ/NY Gotham FC	6	1	3	2	5	8	−3	6		1–1	1–3	—	1–1
4	Orlando Pride	6	0	2	4	4	11	−7	2		2–4	0–0	0–1	—

Source: NWSL
Rules for classification: 1) Total points; 2) Total goal differential; 3) Total number of goals scored; 4) Head-to-head points record; 5) Head-to-head goal differential; 6) Head-to-head number of goals scored; 7) Fewest disciplinary points; 8) Drawing of lots

Central Division

Pos	Team	Pld	W	T	L	GF	GA	GD	Pts	Qualification	KC	CHI	LOU	HOU
1	Kansas City Current	6	4	1	1	10	7	+3	13	Advance to knockout stage	—	2–1	0–3	2–1
2	Chicago Red Stars	6	2	2	2	8	6	+2	8		1–2	—	0–0	2–0
3	Racing Louisville FC	6	1	3	2	8	7	+1	6		1–1	1–1	—	2–3
4	Houston Dash	6	2	0	4	7	13	−6	6		0–3	1–3	2–1	—

Source: NWSL
Rules for classification: 1) Total points; 2) Total goal differential; 3) Total number of goals scored; 4) Head-to-head points record; 5) Head-to-head goal differential; 6) Head-to-head number of goals scored; 7) Fewest disciplinary points; 8) Drawing of lots

West Division

Pos	Team	Pld	W	T	L	GF	GA	GD	Pts	Qualification	RGN	POR	SD	LA
1	OL Reign	6	4	2	0	11	5	+6	14	Advance to knockout stage	—	1–1	3–1	2–1
2	Portland Thorns FC	6	3	1	2	8	5	+3	10		0–1	—	3–2	3–0
3	San Diego Wave FC	6	1	2	3	9	11	−2	5		1–1	0–1	—	4–2
4	Angel City FC	6	1	1	4	6	13	−7	4		1–3	1–0	1–1	—

Source: NWSL
Rules for classification: 1) Total points; 2) Total goal differential; 3) Total number of goals scored; 4) Head-to-head points record; 5) Head-to-head goal differential; 6) Head-to-head number of goals scored; 7) Fewest disciplinary points; 8) Drawing of lots

Ranking of second-placed teams

Pos	Grp	Team	Pld	W	T	L	GF	GA	GD	Pts	Qualification
1	East	Washington Spirit	6	2	4	0	12	7	+5	10	Advance to knockout stage
2	West	Portland Thorns FC	6	3	1	2	8	5	+3	10	
3	Central	Chicago Red Stars	6	2	2	2	8	6	+2	8	

Source: NWSL
Rules for classification: 1) Total points; 2) Total goal differential; 3) Total number of goals scored; 4) Fewest disciplinary points; 4) Drawing of lots

====== Championship ======
May 7
13:00 ET

North Carolina Courage	2–1	Washington Spirit
Kerolin 10'; Aylmer 70' (o.g.)	Report	Hatch 35'

WakeMed Soccer Park, Cary, North Carolina
Attendance: 3,163
Referee: Katja Koroleva

== Honors ==
=== Professional ===
Men
Competition		Winner
U.S. Open Cup		Orlando City SC
MLS Supporters' Shield		Los Angeles FC
MLS Cup		Los Angeles FC
CONCACAF Champions League		Seattle Sounders FC
USL Championship	Regular season	San Antonio FC
USL Championship	Playoffs	San Antonio FC
MLS Next Pro	Regular season	Columbus Crew 2
MLS Next Pro	Playoffs	Columbus Crew 2
USL League One	Regular season	Richmond Kickers
USL League One	Playoffs	Tormenta FC
NISA	Regular season	California United Strikers FC
NISA	Playoffs	Michigan Stars FC

Women
Competition	Winner
NWSL Challenge Cup	North Carolina Courage
National Women's Soccer League	Portland Thorns FC
NWSL Shield	OL Reign

=== Amateur ===
Men
Competition	Team
USL League Two	Ventura County Fusion
National Premier Soccer League	FC Motown
National Amateur Cup	Bavarian United SC
NCAA Division I Soccer Championship	Syracuse University
NCAA Division II Soccer Championship	Franklin Pierce University
NCAA Division III Soccer Championship	University of Chicago
NAIA Soccer Championship	Bethel University (Indiana)

Women
Competition	Team
United Women's Soccer	Chicago Mustangs
USL W League	Tormenta FC
Women's Premier Soccer League	California Storm
NCAA Division I Soccer Championship	UCLA
NCAA Division II Soccer Championship	Western Washington University
NCAA Division III Soccer Championship	Johns Hopkins University
NAIA Soccer Championship	Spring Arbor University
