= Nicolás García =

Nicolás García may refer to:

- Nicolás García (taekwondo) (born 1988), Spanish taekwondo athlete
- Nicolás García (diver) (born 1995), Spanish diver
- Nicolas Garcia (footballer, born 1986), Colombian footballer
- Nicolás García (swimmer) (born 2002), Spanish swimmer
- Nicolás García (footballer, born 2000), Uruguayan footballer
