= 2022 USL W League season =

USL W League
- Season: 2022
- Dates: May 6 - July 10 (regular season); July 13 - July 23 (playoffs)
- Champions: South Georgia Tormenta FC (1st Title)
- Regular Season Champions: Minnesota Aurora FC (1st Title)
- Matches: 254
- Goals: 935 (3.68 per match)
- Best Player: (England) Amy Andrews South Georgia Tormenta FC
- Top goalscorer: (England) Amy Andrews South Georgia Tormenta FC (16 Goals)
- Best goalkeeper: (Puerto Rico) Sydney Martinez South Georgia Tormenta FC
- Biggest home win: LIR 18, FAE 0 (July 6)
- Biggest away win: FAE 2, ACC 10 (June 14); FAE 0, MAN 8 (June 22)
- Highest scoring: LIR 18, FAE 0 (July 6)
- Longest winning run: 11 matches Minnesota Aurora FC (June 2 – July 9)
- Longest unbeaten run: 12 matches Minnesota Aurora FC (entire season)
- Longest winless run: 12 matches St. Louis Lions (entire season)
- Longest losing run: 12 matches St. Louis Lions (entire season)
- All statistics correct as of August 3, 2022.

The 2022 USL W League season is the first season of USL W League.

The regular season began on May 6 and ended on July 10. 44 teams participated in this inaugural season.

Indy Eleven won the first game in league history, defeating Kings Hammer FC 3–1 on May 6. Rachel McCarthy scored the first two goals.

South Georgia Tormenta FC won the Championship 2–1 against Regular Season winners Minnesota Aurora FC on July 23.

== Standings ==
=== Metropolitan Division ===
Pos	Team	Pld	W	D	L	GF	GA	GD	Pts	PPG	Qualification
1	Morris Elite SC	12	8	3	1	28	10	+18	27	2.25	Advance to USL W League Playoffs
2	Long Island Rough Riders	12	8	2	2	45	7	+38	26	2.17	Advance to USL W League Playoffs
3	Queensboro FC	12	8	1	3	33	12	+21	25	2.08	
4	Cedar Stars	12	8	1	3	30	11	+19	25	2.08	
5	AC Connecticut	12	5	2	5	24	17	+7	17	1.42	
6	Manhattan SC	12	4	1	7	24	29	−5	13	1.08	
7	Westchester Flames	12	2	0	10	11	40	−29	6	0.50	
8	F.A. Euro	12	0	0	12	9	78	−69	0	0.00	

Source: USL

=== Mid Atlantic Division ===
Pos	Team	Pld	W	D	L	GF	GA	GD	Pts	PPG	Qualification
1	McLean Soccer	10	9	0	1	39	7	+32	27	2.70	Advance to USL W League Playoffs
2	Christos FC	10	6	1	3	26	13	+13	19	1.90	
3	Patuxent Football Athletics	10	4	0	6	8	29	−21	12	1.20	
4	Eagle FC	10	3	1	6	17	26	−9	10	1.00	
5	Northern Virginia FC	10	1	2	7	12	27	−15	5	0.50	

Source: USL

=== Great Lakes Division ===
Pos	Team	Pld	W	D	L	GF	GA	GD	Pts	PPG	Qualification
1	Indy Eleven	12	10	2	0	31	7	+24	32	2.67	Advance to USL W League Playoffs
2	Midwest United FC	12	7	2	3	36	17	+19	23	1.92	
3	Racing Louisville FC	12	6	3	3	26	15	+11	21	1.75	
4	AFC Ann Arbor	12	6	3	3	23	15	+8	21	1.75	
5	Detroit City FC	12	3	3	6	15	22	−7	12	1.00	
6	Kalamazoo FC	12	3	1	8	23	30	−7	10	0.83	
7	Kings Hammer FC	12	2	3	7	12	36	−24	9	0.75	
8	Flint City AFC	12	2	1	9	17	41	−24	7	0.58	

Source: USL

=== Heartland Division ===
Pos	Team	Pld	W	D	L	GF	GA	GD	Pts	PPG	Qualification
1	Minnesota Aurora FC	12	11	1	0	35	8	+27	34	2.83	Advance to USL W League Playoffs
2	Kaw Valley FC	12	7	1	4	30	15	+15	22	1.83	
3	Green Bay Glory	12	6	3	3	19	17	+2	21	1.75	
4	Chicago City SC	12	6	1	5	26	21	+5	19	1.58	
5	Chicago Dutch Lions	12	3	0	9	12	27	−15	9	0.75	
6	St. Louis Lions	12	0	0	12	9	43	−34	0	0.00	

Source: USL

=== South Atlantic Division ===
Pos	Team	Pld	W	D	L	GF	GA	GD	Pts	PPG	Qualification
1	Greenville Liberty SC	12	8	2	2	32	13	+19	26	2.17	Advance to USL W League Playoffs
2	North Carolina Courage U23	12	6	4	2	25	15	+10	22	1.83	
3	Wake FC	12	6	1	5	20	17	+3	19	1.58	
4	Charlotte Independence	12	4	3	5	18	18	0	15	1.25	
5	Asheville City SC	12	3	6	3	20	18	+2	15	1.25	
6	North Carolina Fusion	12	1	0	11	5	39	−34	3	0.25	

Source: USL

=== South Central Division ===
Pos	Team	Pld	W	D	L	GF	GA	GD	Pts	PPG	Qualification
1	Tormenta FC	12	7	4	1	33	9	+24	25	2.08	Advance to USL W League Playoffs
2	Chattanooga Red Wolves SC	12	7	3	2	21	12	+9	24	2.00	
3	South Carolina United FC	12	5	2	5	20	26	−6	17	1.42	
4	Southern Soccer Academy	12	4	5	3	26	22	+4	17	1.42	
5	Tennessee SC	12	2	2	8	13	32	−19	8	0.67	
6	Peachtree City MOBA	12	1	4	7	11	23	−12	7	0.58	

Source: USL

=== Southeast Division ===
Pos	Team	Pld	W	D	L	GF	GA	GD	Pts	PPG	Qualification
1	FC Miami City	10	9	1	0	21	4	+17	28	2.80	Advance to USL W League Playoffs
2	Tampa Bay United	10	7	1	2	19	4	+15	22	2.20	
3	Miami AC	10	5	0	5	16	21	−5	15	1.50	
4	Florida Elite SA	10	1	1	8	7	17	−10	4	0.40	
5	Caledonia SC	10	1	1	8	8	25	−17	4	0.40	

Source: USL

== Playoffs ==
=== Bracket ===
Quarterfinals
Morris Elite SC	0
McLean Soccer	8
Minnesota Aurora FC	2
Indy Eleven	1
FC Miami City	0
Tormenta FC	1
Greenville Liberty SC	2
Long Island Rough Riders	0

Semifinals
McLean Soccer	0
Minnesota Aurora FC	1
Tormenta FC	4
Greenville Liberty SC	1

Final
Minnesota Aurora FC	1
Tormenta FC (a.e.t.)	2

=== Quarterfinals ===
July 13	FC Miami City	0–1	Tormenta FC	Tropical Park; Miami, Florida
6:00 PM EDT	Hall (yellow card); Mendez (yellow card)	Report	Giddes (yellow card); Andrews 62'

July 13	Greenville Liberty SC	2–0	Long Island Rough Riders	Legacy Early College Field; Greenville, South Carolina
7:00 PM EDT	Reilly 37'; Mackin 70'	Report

July 13	Morris Elite SC	0–8	McLean Soccer	Frederick Douglass Field; Newark, New Jersey
7:30 PM EDT		Report	Turner 15'; Leas 17'; Felton 24'; Harwood 29'; Caloia 42', 50'; McBride 67'; Meeks 73'

July 13	Minnesota Aurora FC	2–1	Indy Eleven	TCO Stadium; Eagan, Minnesota
7:00 PM CDT	Turner 50'; Preston 64' (pen.)	Report	Rogers 34'	Attendance: 6,200

=== Semifinals ===
July 17	Minnesota Aurora FC	1–0	McLean Soccer	TCO Stadium; Eagan, Minnesota
3:00 PM EDT	Turner 52'	Report		Attendance: 6,200

July 17	Greenville Liberty SC	1–4	Tormenta FC	Legacy Early College Field; Greenville, South Carolina
7:00 PM EDT	Conti 66'	Report	Olalere 55'; Andrews 69', 79'; Nyby 73'; Scully (yellow card)

=== W League Championship ===
July 23	Minnesota Aurora FC	1–2 (a.e.t.)	Tormenta FC	TCO Stadium; Eagan, Minnesota
4:30 PM CDT	Symonds 22' (yellow card); Nguyen (yellow card)	Report	Nyby 6', 115' (yellow card)	Attendance: 6,489

Championship MVP: (Puerto Rico) Sydney Martinez (TRM)

== Awards ==
Award	Winner	Team	Reason	Ref.
Golden Boot	(England) Amy Andrews	Tormenta FC	16 goals in 10 games	
Golden Glove	(Puerto Rico) Sydney Martinez	Tormenta FC	0.58 Goals Against Average; 6 Shutouts	
Assists Champion	(United States) Treva Aycock	Southern Soccer Academy	8 assists	
Coach of the Year	(United States) Nicole Lukic	Minnesota Aurora FC	Undefeated Regular Season	
Young (U20) Player of the Year	(Trinidad and Tobago) Christian Brathwaite	Greenville Liberty SC	Four goals; four assists	
Player of the Year	(England) Amy Andrews	Tormenta FC	16 goals; 2 assists	
Goal of the Year	(United States) Addy Symonds	Minnesota Aurora FC	vs Tormenta FC in the Final	
Save of the Year	(United States) Madison Howard	North Carolina Fusion	vs Greenville Liberty SC	

=== Monthly Awards ===
Team of the Month
Month	Goalkeeper	Defenders	Midfielders	Forwards	Ref.
May	(United States) Mackenzie Wood (IND)	(United States) Emily Madril (RCL) (United States) Lilly Yordy (KGH) (United States) Tori Hansen (NCC) (United States) Megan Bornkamp (GVL)	(United States) Lauren Wrigley (MOR) (Mexico) Ella Sanchez (RCL) (Trinidad and Tobago) Christian Brathwaite (GVL)	(United States) Caroline Conti (GVL) (United States) Katie Soderstrom (IND) (United States) Makenna Morris (MCL)	
June	(Puerto Rico) Sydney Martinez (TRM)	(United States) Robyn McCarthy (IND) (United States) Kenzie Langdok (MNA) (Honduras) Barbara Murillo (FMC)	(Canada) Nicole Waters (WAK) (United States) Mariah Nguyen (MNA) (United States) Treva Aycock (SSA)	(England) Amy Andrews (TRM) (Dominican Republic) Mia Asenjo (QUE) (United States) Bailey Korhorn (KAL) (United States) Maddy Williams (IND)	

== All-League Teams ==
=== First Team ===
F: (England) Amy Andrews (TRM), (United States) Katie Soderstrom (IND), (Dominican Republic) Mía Asenjo (QFC)
M: (Trinidad and Tobago) Christian Brathwaite (GVL), (United States) Treva Aycock (SSA), (Canada) Nicole Waters (WAK)
D: (United States) Kenzie Langdok (MNA), (United States) Robyn McCarthy (IND), (Honduras) Bárbara Murillo (FMC), (United States) Nina Carlomusto (LIR)
G: (Puerto Rico) Sydney Martinez (TRM)

=== Second Team ===
F: (United States) Maddy Williams (IND), (United States) Bailey Korhorn (KAL), (United States) Aleigh Gambone (MCL)
M: (United States) Caroline Conti (GVL), (United States) Jaida Nyby (TRM), (United States) Lauren Wrigley (MOR)
D: (United States) Kelsey Kaufusi (MNA), (United States) Abby Wolf (TRM), (United States) Emily Madril (LOU), (United States) Maggie Shaw (CHT)
G: (United States) Sarah Fuller (MNA)
