= Balsamo (disambiguation) =

Bálsamo is a municipality in the state of São Paulo, Brazil.

Bálsamo may also refer to:

== People ==
- Agata Balsamo (born 1970), an Italian former long-distance runner
- Anna Balsamo, an Italian poet
- Carino of Balsamo, the murderer of Saint Peter of Verona
- Elisa Balsamo (cyclist) (born 1998), Italian road and track cyclist
- Elisa Balsamo (tennis) (born 1983), Italian tennis player
- Ignazio Balsamo (1912–1994), an Italian actor
- Joe Balsamo, an Italian-American football manager
- Steve Balsamo (born 1971), a Welsh singer-songwriter
- Terry Balsamo (born 1972), an American guitarist
- Theodorus Balsamo, 12th century canonist of the Eastern Orthodox Church
- Tony Balsamo (1936–2026), a former Major League Baseball player
- Umberto Balsamo (born 1942), an Italian singer-songwriter and composer

== Other ==
- Cinisello Balsamo, an Italian municipality
- Josephine Balsamo, a fictional character
- Large-flowered Balsamo, a species of plant
- Balsamus, l'uomo di Satana, an Italian horror film
- Balsam of Peru, a balsam from a tree in Central and South America
- Balsamo, the Living Skull, a brazen head illusion by Joseffy
