= Brooklyn Knights =

- Full name: Brooklyn Knights
- Nickname: The Knights
- Founded: 1999
- Dissolved: 2013
- Ground: Metropolitan Oval; Maspeth, New York
- Owner: Jim Vogt
- Head Coach: Andreas Lindberg
- League: USL Premier Development League
- 2011: 9th, Mid Atlantic; Playoffs: DNQ
Home colors	Away colors

Brooklyn Knights were an American soccer club based in New York City. Founded in 1999, the Knights currently field youth teams in the United Soccer Leagues Super-20 League and Super Y-League. The team also previously field a team in the USL Premier Development League (PDL), the fourth tier of the American Soccer Pyramid, in the Mid Atlantic Division of the Eastern Conference. The Knights decided to cease fielding a team in the PDL in January 2013.

The club plays its home games at the Metropolitan Oval in Maspeth, Queens, where they have played since 2004. Brooklyn's team colors are white and blue.

== History ==
The main philosophy of the Brooklyn Knights revolves around that of player development and the belief that it should be fully accomplished by the time an athlete reaches the age of 23. Despite the Knights' strict adherence to the use of players under-23 (the PDL allows up to eight on a roster), the team has qualified for the PDL national playoffs several times during their existence while fielding players as young as 17 to do so.

In 2000, the Knights became a sponsor of youth soccer teams that are overseen by the Metropolitan Oval Foundation, Inc. that include seven teams ranging from Under-11 to Under-18.

The Knights began playing home games at the Metropolitan Oval in 2004 and, after a short hiatus, returned to the stadium in 2010. The complex was constructed in 1925 and continues to be the oldest soccer-only facility in the United States, hosting 15–20 games each week from March to November.

== Notable former players ==
This list of notable former players comprises players who went on to play professional soccer after playing for the team in the Premier Development League, or those who previously played professionally before joining the team.

- (Ghana) Joseph Afful
- (United States) Knox Cameron
- (United States) Jeff Carroll
- (United States) Edson Elcock
- (United States) Gary Flood
- (Italy) Giuseppe Funicello
- (Colombia) Nicolas Garcia
- (Puerto Rico) Bill Gaudette
- (United States) Kyle Hoffer
- (Ivory Coast) Guy-Roland Kpene
- (Puerto Rico) Chris Megaloudis
- (United States) Gary Sullivan
- (United States) Chris Wingert
- (United States) John Wolyniec
- (Afghanistan) Mohammad Mashriqi

== Year-by-year ==
(As of July 6, 2012)

Year	Division	League	Regular season	Playoffs	Open Cup
1999	4	USL PDL	3rd, Northeast	Did not qualify	Did not qualify
2000	4	USL PDL	4th, Northeast	Did not qualify	Did not qualify
2001	4	USL PDL	2nd, Northeast	Conference Semifinals	Did not qualify
2002	4	USL PDL	5th, Northeast	Did not qualify	Did not qualify
2003	4	USL PDL	3rd, Northeast	Did not qualify	Did not qualify
2004	4	USL PDL	6th, Northeast	Did not qualify	Did not qualify
2005	4	USL PDL	8th, Northeast	Did not qualify	Did not qualify
2006	4	USL PDL	5th, Northeast	Did not qualify	Did not qualify
2007	4	USL PDL	2nd, Northeast	National Semifinals	Did not qualify
2008	4	USL PDL	1st, Northeast	Conference Finals	1st Round
2009	4	USL PDL	4th, Northeast	Did not qualify	Did not qualify
2010	4	USL PDL	8th, Northeast	Did not qualify	Did not qualify
2011	4	USL PDL	9th, Mid Atlantic	Did not qualify	Did not qualify
2012	4	USL PDL	6th, Mid Atlantic	N/A	N/A

== Honors ==
- USL PDL Northeast Division Champions 2008
- USL PDL Eastern Conference Champions 2007

== Head coaches ==
- (Italy) Joe Balsamo (2007–2010)
- (Sweden) Andreas Lindberg (2011–2012)

== Stadia ==
- Metropolitan Oval; Maspeth, New York (2004–2006, 2010–present)
- Aviator Field; Brooklyn, New York (2007–2009)
- Stadium at Adelphi University; Garden City, New York 1 game (2010)

== Average attendance ==
Attendance stats are calculated by averaging each team's self-reported home attendances from the historical match archive at https://web.archive.org/web/20100105175057/http://www.uslsoccer.com/history/index_E.html and Kenn.com https://kenn.com/blog/soccer/all-time-usl-league-two-attendance/.

- 1999: 47
- 2000: 75
- 2001: 97
- 2002: 132
- 2003: 298
- 2004: 142
- 2005: 120
- 2006: 105
- 2007: 251
- 2008: 212
- 2009: 670
- 2010: 111
- 2011: 69
- 2012: 80
