= F.A. Euro =

FA Euro New York
- Full name: Euro Youth Football Association
- Nickname: FA Euro
- Founded: 2013; 13 years ago
- Stadium: Poly Prep Country Day School; Brooklyn, New York
- Capacity: 3,500
- Owner: Euro Youth Football Association Inc.
- President: Joe Balsamo
- Head Coach: Joe Balsamo
- League: USL League Two
- 2023: 9th, Metropolitan Division; Playoffs: DNQ
- Website: http://www.faeuro.com
Home colors	Away colors	Third colors

Euro Youth Football Association (FA Euro or FA Euro New York) is a soccer team based in Brooklyn, New York that plays in USL League Two. The club is owned and operated by Euro Youth Football Association Inc., a 501(c)(3) organization exempt from income tax under the United States Internal Revenue Code. Established in 2013, FA Euro New York focuses on providing youth players with a pathway to play at the professional and/or collegiate levels.

FA Euro’s senior team competes in the USL League Two.

== History ==
For the past decade, Joe Balsamo has been running summer soccer camps and international tours. Originally known as FA Eurocamp, the goal of the program was to bring top European coaches to the United States to train American players and to expose them to the European soccer model. After expanding the program to include camps in New York, New Jersey, Connecticut, and Florida, Balsamo began offering tours for youth players. On these tours, FA Eurocamp escorted American teams through Europe and South America as they played exhibition matches against youth teams at the world’s top clubs. Since the Club's birth in 2013, FA Euro has grown from a small organization consisting of three staff members and only one team into a household name in US youth soccer. FA Euro New York was announced as a semi-professional men's team when the PDL released its 2013 schedule.

== Stadium ==
FA Euro New York's USL League Two team played its home matches at Belson Stadium, on the campus of St. John's University in Queens, New York from 2013 to 2018. For the 2018 season, the club moved its home matches to the Aviator Sports and Events Center in Brooklyn. In 2019, the Club moved to the Dyker Heights campus of Poly Prep Country Day School.

In 2021, the club played the majority of their home games at Calvert Vaux Park, though their first home game was played at Central Park's Field #2.

== Year-by-year ==
Year	Division	League	Regular season	Playoffs	Open Cup
2013	4	USL PDL	6th, Mid Atlantic	did not qualify	did not qualify
2014	4	USL PDL	7th, Mid Atlantic	did not qualify	did not qualify
2015	4	USL PDL	8th, Mid Atlantic	did not qualify	did not qualify
2016	4	USL PDL	8th, Northeast	did not qualify	did not qualify
2017	4	USL PDL	5th, Mid Atlantic	did not qualify	did not qualify
2018	4	USL PDL	5th, Mid Atlantic	did not qualify	did not qualify
2019	4	USL League Two	7th, Mid Atlantic	did not qualify	did not qualify
2020	4	USL League Two	Season cancelled due to COVID-19 pandemic		
2021	4	USL League Two	7th, Metropolitan	did not qualify	did not qualify
2022	4	USL League Two	5th, Metropolitan	did not qualify	did not qualify
2023	4	USL League Two	9th, Metropolitan	did not qualify	did not qualify
