= Caroline Conti =

American soccer player (born 2001)

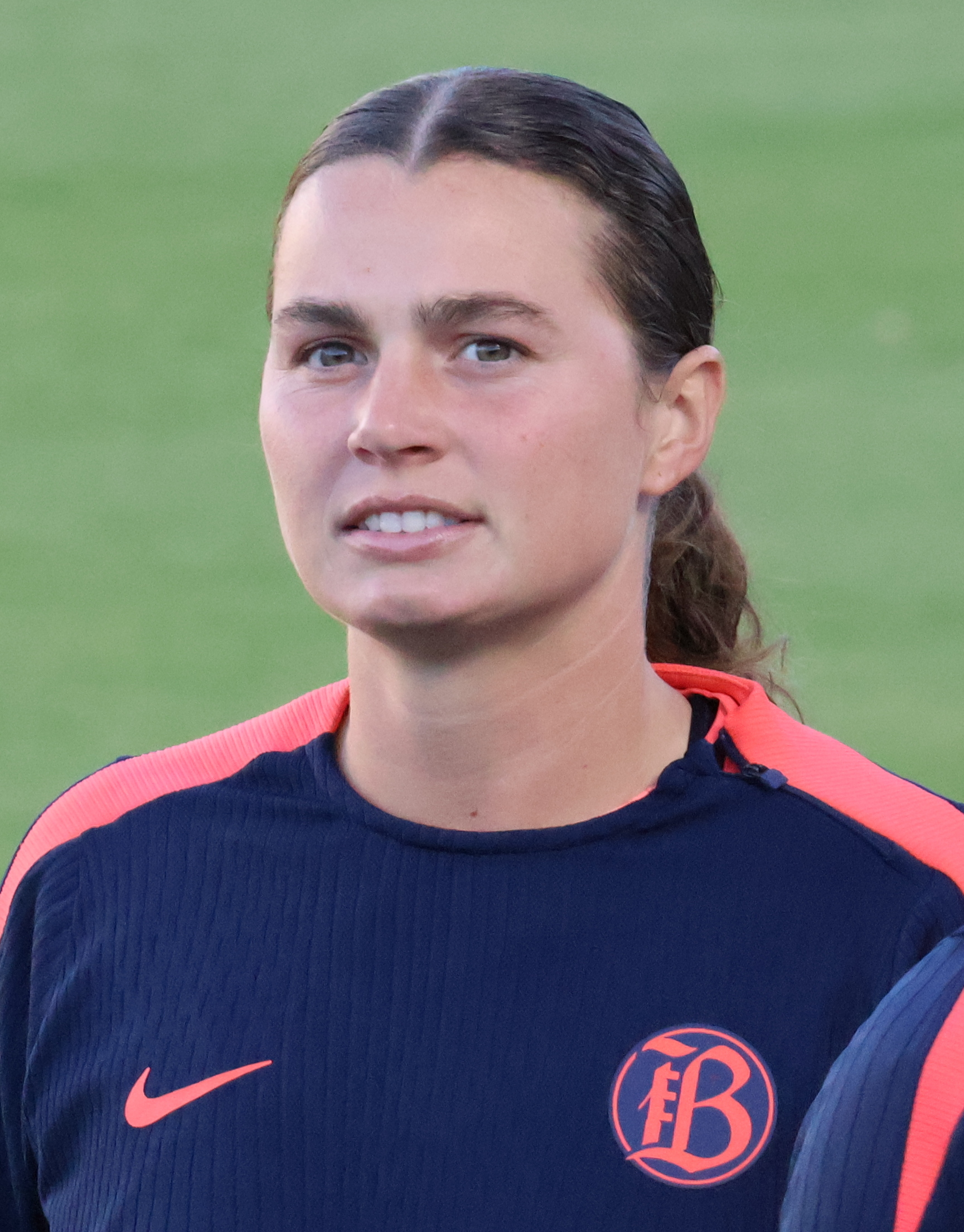
- Conti with Bay FC in 2026

Personal information
- Full name: Caroline Noel Conti
- Date of birth: March 28, 2001 (age 25)
- Place of birth: Charlotte, North Carolina, U.S.
- Height: 5 ft 6 in (1.68 m)
- Positions: Midfielder; forward

Team information
- Current team: Bay FC
- Number: 23

Youth career
- Carolina Elite Soccer Academy

College career
Years	Team	Apps	(Gls)
2019–2023	Clemson Tigers	100	(27)

Senior career*
Years	Team	Apps	(Gls)
2022	Greenville Liberty	9	(10)
2024–	Bay FC	53	(5)

International career
2014	United States U14		
- * Club domestic league appearances and goals as of 05:05, November 2, 2026 (UTC)

Caroline Noel Conti (born March 28, 2001) is an American professional soccer player who plays as a midfielder or forward for Bay FC of the National Women's Soccer League (NWSL). She played college soccer for the Clemson Tigers and was drafted by Bay FC in the 2024 NWSL Draft.

== Early life ==
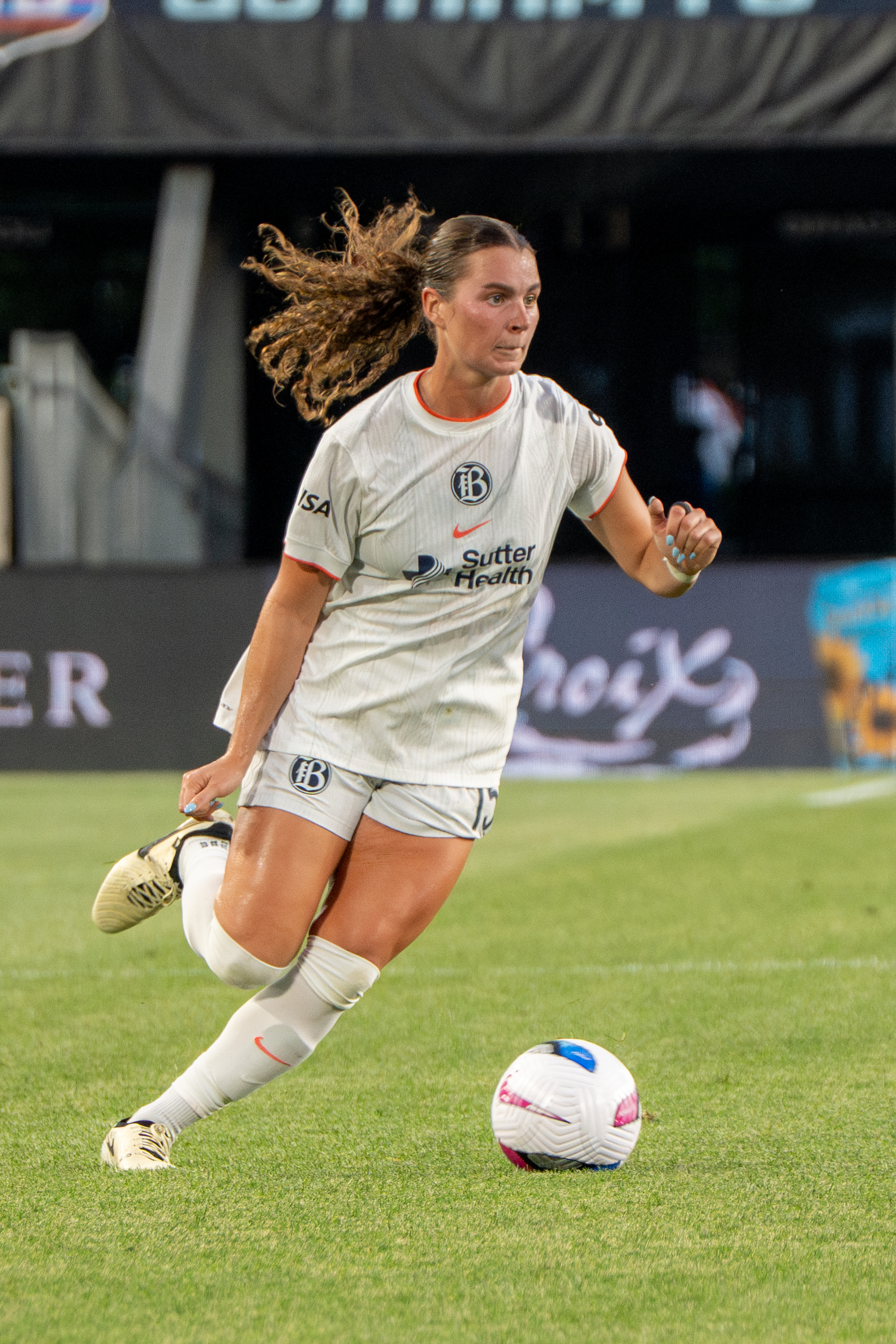
Conti with Bay FC in 2025

Conti was born in Charlotte, North Carolina and raised in Greenville, South Carolina where she attended J. L. Mann High School. She won three straight high school soccer titles in 2017, 2018 and 2019. She was also named South Carolina Gatorade Player of the Year in 2016–17 and 2018–19. She also was named an All-American following her 2018 High School season. Conti played youth club soccer with Carolina Elite Soccer Academy. She received an invitation to a United States under-14 training camp in 2014.

=== Clemson Tigers ===
Conti attended Clemson University, where she played as a forward for the Clemson Tigers from 2019 to 2023. In five years, she played in 100 games, scoring 27 times and registering 20 assists. Clemson qualified for the NCAA Division I tournament in each of Conti's five seasons in the squad. Conti's final year at Clemson in 2023 saw their best season to date. Clemson finished 3rd in the Atlantic Coast Conference's regular season standings, reached the final of the ACC tournament for the first time since 2002 and the fourth time overall, and reached the 2023 NCAA Division I tournament College Cup semi-finals, the first time ever in the program's history.

== Club career ==
=== Greenville Liberty SC ===
Conti played pre-professional club soccer with Greenville Liberty SC in the USL W League. She received USL W League second team honors after scoring 10 goals, the most of a Greenville player, and tallying 4 assists in the 2022 USL W League season.

=== Bay FC ===
Conti was drafted by NWSL expansion side Bay FC on January 12, 2024, selected 34th overall in the 2024 NWSL Draft. She was announced as officially signed on March 13, 2024, as part of the club's inaugural roster. She was signed for the 2024 NWSL season with an option for 2025. Conti made her professional debut on April 20, 2024, as a substitute in the 67th minute of a 5–2 loss away to the Kansas City Current. She made her first start on May 5, 2024, in a 2–1 home loss to the Chicago Red Stars. Conti scored her first NWSL goal on April 13, 2025, netting a penalty kick in another 2–1 home defeat at the hands of the Chicago Stars (formerly the Red Stars).

== International career ==
Conti attended training camp with the United States under-14 team in 2014.

== Career statistics ==
=== Club ===
As of July 4, 2024

Club	Season	League			Cup		Playoffs (Note: Includes NWSL Playoffs)		Total	
Club	Season	Division	Apps	Goals	Apps	Goals	Apps	Goals	Apps	Goals
Bay FC	2024	NWSL	5	0	—		—		5	0
Career total			5	0	0	0	0	0	5	0
