= Joseph Afful =

Ghanaian footballer

Joey Afful
Personal information
- Full name: Joseph Afful
- Date of birth: 30 July 1979 (age 47)
- Place of birth: Accra, Ghana
- Height: 6 ft 1 in (1.85 m)
- Position: Forward

Team information
- Current team: Brooklyn Knights

Youth career
- 2000–2002: St. Francis College
- 2003: Adelphi University

Senior career*
| Years | Team | Apps | (Gls) |
| 2004–2006 | Atlanta Silverbacks | 69 | (0) |
| 2007– | Brooklyn Knights | 9 | (0) |
- * Club domestic league appearances and goals

Joseph Afful (born July 30, 1979, in Accra, Ghana) is a soccer player, who plays for the Brooklyn Knights of the USL Premier Development League.

== Career ==
Afful came to the United States to play college soccer, first with St. Francis College where he was a three time All-Northeast Conference player from 2000 to 2003, and then an Atlantic Soccer Conference player in 2003 with Adelphi University. After college, Afful went on to play with the Atlanta Silverbacks after being released from the New England Revolution prior to joining the Knights in 2007.

== Education ==
Afful has recently received an MBA degree from Adelphi University.

== Personal life ==
Afful became a U.S. citizen in 2005.
