= Nicolas Garcia (footballer, born 1986) =

Colombian footballer (born 1986)

Personal information
- Full name: Nicolas Garcia
- Date of birth: September 30, 1986 (age 40)
- Place of birth: Bucaramanga, Colombia
- Height: 6 ft 1 in (1.85 m)
- Position: Defender

Team information
- Current team: Brooklyn Knights
- Number: 11

Senior career*
Years	Team	Apps	(Gls)
- Millonarios
2009	Charlotte Eagles	2	(0)
2010–	Brooklyn Knights	12	(2)
- * Club domestic league appearances and goals as of August 8, 2010

Nicolas Garcia (born September 30, 1986) is a Colombian footballer. He currently plays for Brooklyn Knights in the USL Premier Development League.

== Career ==
Garcia began his career in his native Colombia, playing for Millonarios in Fútbol Profesional Colombiano. He signed with Charlotte Eagles in 2009, and made his debut for the team on May 1, 2009, in a game against Crystal Palace Baltimore., but made just one more appearance for the club before being released at the end of the year.

Having been unable to secure a professional contract elsewhere, Garcia signed to play for the Brooklyn Knights in the USL Premier Development League in 2010.
