= Tormenta FC (women) =

American soccer club in Statesboro, Georgia

Tormenta FC Women
- Full name: South Georgia Tormenta FC Women
- Founded: June 8, 2021; 4 years ago
- Stadium: Optim Sports Medicine Field
- Capacity: 5,300
- Co-owners: Darin Van Tassell; Netra Van Tassell; Jeff Spencer
- Manager: Jim Robbins
- League: USL W League
- 2023: 3rd, South Central Division; Playoffs: DNQ
- Website: https://www.tormentafc.com/

Template:Tormenta FC sections

South Georgia Tormenta FC Women is an American women's soccer team, that began play in 2022 in USL W League. They are an affiliate of South Georgia Tormenta FC, a men's team in the USL League One.

== History ==
On June 8, 2021, it was announced that Tormenta would be one of the eight founding members of the new league. Tormenta FC women will play their home games at Optim Health System Field, currently under construction in Statesboro, Georgia.

Tormenta FC won the inaugural USL W League Championship, defeating Minnesota Aurora FC 2-1 (aet) on July 23, 2022.

== Roster ==
As of August 5, 2022

No.	Pos.	Nation	Player
0	GK	USA	Sydney Medina
1	GK	PUR	Sydney Martinez
3	MF	USA	Isabella Gutierrez
4	MF	USA	Jenae Packard
5	DF	DEN	Malene Duus
6	MF	USA	Helen Gutierrez
7	FW	ENG	Amy Andrews
8	MF	USA	Emily Burke
9	MF	USA	Remi Olalere
10	MF	USA	Jaida Nyby
13	MF	USA	Kelly Giddes
15	MF	USA	Lauren O’Hearn
16	MF	USA	Erin O’Hearn
17	FW	CAN	Elis Nemtsov
18	DF	ESP	Alicia Zamora
20	DF	USA	Reagan Tate
21	DF	USA	Abby Wolf
22	DF	USA	Jhenna Ellerbe
23	FW	USA	Elise Holcey
24	DF	USA	Camryn Scully
26	MF	NED	Isabel Kopp
27	FW	USA	Allie Rathbun
28	FW	USA	Ella Owen
43	GK	USA	Makenna Gottschalk

== Record ==
=== Year-by-year ===
As of July 20, 2025

Season	USL W League								Playoffs	Top Scorer		Head Coach
Season	P	W	L	D	GF	GA	Pts	Pos	Playoffs	Player	Goals	Head Coach
2022	12	7	1	4	33	9	25	1st, South Central	W League Champions	(England) Amy Andrews	16	(United States) Jim Robbins
2023	12	6	3	3	20	9	21	3rd, South Central	Did not qualify	(United States) Kiana Jacobson	5	(United States) Jim Robbins
2024	12	9	1	2	36	10	26	2nd, South Atlantic	Did not qualify			(United States) Jim Robbins
2025	11	6	4	1	25	14	19	4th, South Atlantic	Did not qualify	(France) Mady Soumare (Ghana) Constance Agyemang	5	(United States) Kian Brownlee

=== Head coaches ===
- Includes Regular Season and Playoffs. Excludes friendlies.

Coach	Nationality	Start	End	Games	Win	Loss	Draw	Win %
Jim Robbins	United States	October 16, 2021	March 4, 2025	36	22	5	9	61.11
Kian Brownlee	United States	March 5, 2025	present	11	6	4	1	54.55

== Honors ==
- USL W League
  - Champions: 2022
  - South Central Division Winner: 2022

=== Player honors ===
Year	Player	Country	Position	Honor
2022	Amy Andrews	England	Forward	Player of the Year; Golden Boot; All-League First Team
2022	Sydney Martinez	United States	Goalkeeper	Golden Glove; All-League First Team
2022	Jaida Nyby	United States	Midfielder	All-League Second Team
2022	Abby Wolf	United States	Defender	All-League Second Team

== See also ==
- Tormenta FC
- Tormenta FC 2
