= Tormenta Stadium =

Soccer stadium in Statesboro, Georgia, US

Optim Sports Medicine Field at Tormenta Stadium
- Interactive map of Optim Sports Medicine Field at Tormenta Stadium
- Address: 100 Tormenta Way; Statesboro, GA 30458
- Coordinates: 32°24′35″N 81°47′46″W
- Capacity: 3,500
- Surface: Grass
- Record attendance: 3,045

Construction
- Groundbreaking: March 27, 2019
- Opened: October 2, 2022

Tenants
- Tormenta FC (USL1) (2022–25); Tormenta FC (W League) (W League) (2023–present)

Optim Sports Medicine Field at Tormenta Stadium is a currently 3,500-seat soccer-specific stadium in Statesboro, Georgia, with an expected finished capacity of 5,300. The stadium is the home field for Tormenta FC (women), which competes in the USL W League.

The stadium's playing surface features a high-tech SubAir Sport System, which monitors subsurface conditions of the pitch and can control moisture and temperature of the natural surface. The pitch can be drained using a vacuum system, which can pull water through the turf in as little as ten minutes.

== History ==
The stadium opened on October 2, 2022 with Tormenta securing a 1–1 tie versus the Richmond Kickers in USL League One play. Tormenta's Fuad Adeniyi scored the opening goal in the 41st minute.

On November 6th, 2022, the stadium hosted the 2022 USL League One Final, which saw Tormenta FC defeat the Chattanooga Red Wolves to claim their first league title in front of 3,045 spectators.
