= Greenville Liberty SC =

- Full name: Greenville Liberty Soccer Club
- Founded: June 8, 2021; 5 years ago
- Ground: Paladin Stadium; Greenville, South Carolina
- Capacity: 10,000
- Owners: Joe Erwin; William M. Webster
- President: Chris Lewis
- Head Coach: Julie Carlson
- League: USL W League
- 2022: 1st, South Atlantic Division; Playoffs: National Semifinals
- Website: www.greenvilleliberty.com
Home colors	Away colors

Greenville Liberty SC is an American women's soccer team, that began play in 2022 in USL W League. They are affiliated with Greenville Triumph SC, a men's team in the USL League One.

== History ==
On June 8, 2021, Greenville Triumph SC announced that they would create a women's team that would be one of the eight founding members of the new W League. Fans chose the name Greenville Liberty, which was announced along with the team colors and crest, on March 23, 2022 .

The Liberty won their first game by defeating the Charlotte Independence women's team 4-2 on May 15 in Charlotte. They won their home debut by defeating the North Carolina Courage U23s 6-1 on May 20.

== Players and staff ==
=== Current roster ===
As of July 17, 2022

No.	Pos.	Nation	Player
2	DF	USA	Cambelle Roberson
3	DF	USA	Emmie Wannemacher
4	MF	TRI	Christian Brathwaite
5	DF	USA	Julie Mackin
6	MF	USA	Caitlyn Reilly
7	FW	USA	Carly Thatcher
8	DF	USA	Haley Schueppert
9	DF	USA	Cameron Whitacre
10	FW	USA	Bailey Manfredi
12	FW	USA	Maddie Turlington
13	FW	USA	Autumn Cayelli
14	DF	USA	Camryn Bolick
15	MF	USA	Hal Hershfelt
16	FW	USA	Courtney Jones
17	MF	USA	Sarah Jacobs
18	DF	USA	Reagan Burns
19	MF	USA	Riley Parsons
20	MF	USA	Anna Grace Abrams
21	MF	USA	Ellie Gower
22	MF	USA	Grace Baghdady
23	FW	USA	Caroline Conti
24	DF	USA	Megan Bornkamp
26	MF	USA	Bethany Morgan
27	FW	NIR	Breckyn Monteith
28	FW	USA	Alexah Fite
29	FW	USA	Sami Meredith
31	GK	USA	Reaghan Duval
32	GK	USA	Allanah Blye
33	GK	USA	Lauren Seedlock
36	DF	USA	Maggie Miller
99	FW	USA	Chidubem Dike

=== Staff ===
As of September 8, 2022

- (United States) Megan Kolak – Senior Vice-president
- (United States) Julie Carlson – Head Coach & Technical Director
- (United States) Sarah Jacobs – Assistant Coach
- (United States) Kevin Kennedy – Assistant Coach
- (United States) Santiago Restrepo – Goalkeeping Coach
- (United States) Blakely Mattern – Performance Coach
- (United States) India Trotter – Performance Coach

== Record ==
=== Year-by-year ===
As of July 23, 2025

Season	USL W League								Playoffs	Top Scorer		Head coach
Season	P	W	L	D	GF	GA	Pts	Pos	Playoffs	Player	Goals	Head coach
2022	12	8	2	2	32	13	26	1st, South Atlantic	National Semifinals	(United States) Caroline Conti	10	(United States) Julie Carlson
2023	12	3	9	0	16	27	9	6th, South Atlantic	Did not qualify	(United States) Christian Brathwaite (United States) Molly Dwyer	3	(United States) Julie Carlson
2024	12	5	6	1	17	13	16	5th, South Central	Did not qualify			(United States) Julie Carlson
2025	12	7	4	1	20	14	22	2nd, South Central	Did not qualify	(United States) Briyah Drayton (Canada) Lela Stark (United States) Payton Nutzman	3	(United States) Julie Carlson

=== Head coaches ===
- Includes Regular Season and Playoffs. Excludes friendlies.

Coach	Nationality	Start	End	Games	Win	Loss	Draw	Win %
Julie Carlson	United States	December 9, 2021	present	26	12	12	2	46.15

== Honors ==
- USL W League
  - South Atlantic Division Winner: 2022

=== Player honors ===
Year	Player	Country	Position	Honor
2022	Christian Brathwaite	(Trinidad and Tobago) Trinidad & Tobago	Midfielder	Young (U20) Player of the Year; All-League First Team
2022	Caroline Conti	United States	Midfielder	All-League Second Team

== See also ==
- Greenville Triumph SC
