= Sydney Martinez =

Puerto Rican footballer (born 1999)

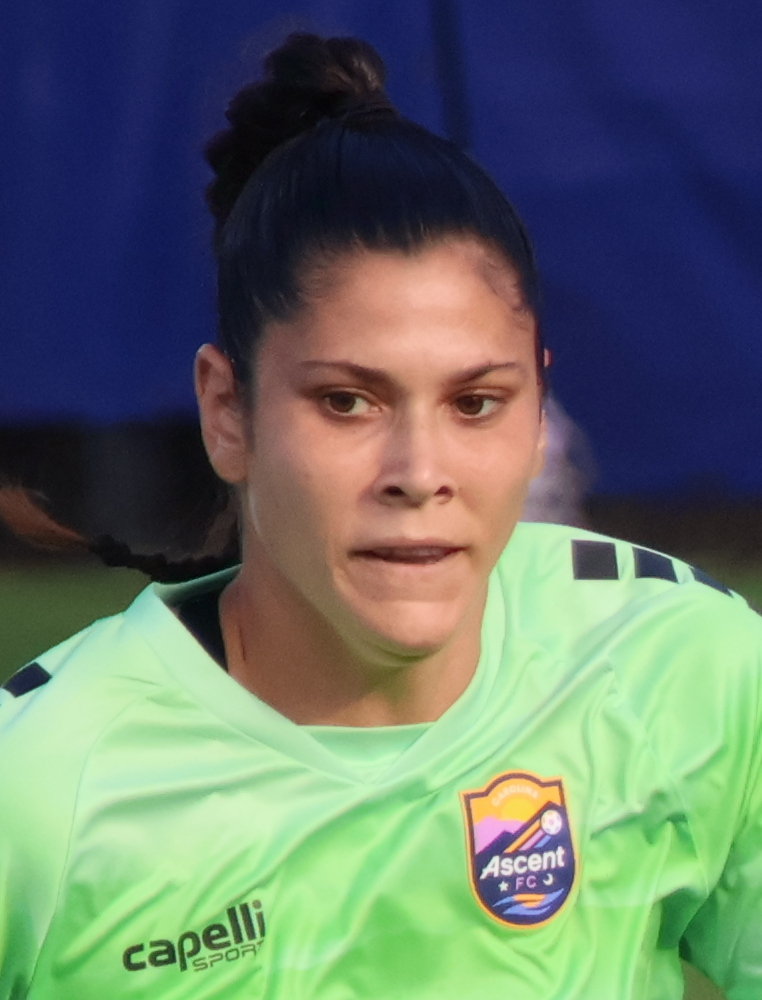
- Martinez with the Carolina Ascent in 2025

Personal information
- Full name: Sydney Elizabeth Martinez
- Date of birth: September 12, 1999 (age 27)
- Place of birth: Rincon, Georgia, U.S.
- Height: 1.83 m (6 ft 0 in)
- Position: Goalkeeper

Team information
- Current team: Carolina Ascent
- Number: 15

Youth career
- 2016–2017: Jacksonville Armada

College career
Years	Team	Apps	(Gls)
2018–2022	South Florida Bulls	80	(0)

Senior career*
Years	Team	Apps	(Gls)
2021	Savannah Spirit	3	(0)
2022	Tormenta FC	–	(–)
2023–2024	IK Grand Bodø	–	(–)
2024–2025	Brooklyn FC	11	(0)
2025–	Carolina Ascent	12	(0)

International career
2023–	Puerto Rico	8	(0)
- * Club domestic league appearances and goals as of 17:27, June 4, 2026 (UTC)

Sydney Elizabeth Martinez (born September 12, 1999) is a professional footballer who plays as a goalkeeper for USL Super League club Carolina Ascent. Born in the mainland United States, she plays for the Puerto Rico national team.

== Early life ==
Martinez grew up in Rincon, Georgia, United States.

== Education ==
Martinez attended Effingham County High School in the United States, where she was regarded as one of the soccer team's most important players. After that, she attended the University of South Florida, where she posted impressive numbers in her five-year career at for the South Florida Bulls.

== Club career ==
Martinez joined Women's Premier Soccer League club Savannah Spirit in 2021.

In 2022, Martinez played for USL W League side Tormenta FC, where she captained the club. She helped the team win the inaugural league championship, and captured the Golden Glove and Finals MVP awards herself.

Martinez signed for Norwegian club IK Grand Bodø in March 2023.

On June 7, 2024, Martinez was announced as the first-ever signing for Brooklyn FC ahead of the inaugural USL Super League season.

After one season at Brooklyn, Martinez moved to Carolina Ascent FC in July 2025. She was named to the March 2026 USL Super League Team of the Month after only conceding one goal across the Ascent's four fixtures that month.

== International career ==
Martinez played for the Olympic Development Program. Martinez was called up to the Puerto Rico women's national football team for the third time in June 2023.

== Style of play ==
Martinez has been described as "difficult to shoot over, has good lateral movement, aggressively fights for balls in the box and often flips the field with booming punts".
