= Nicolás García (footballer, born 2000) =

Uruguayan association football player

Personal information
- Full name: Álvaro Nicolás García Silvera
- Date of birth: 5 October 2000 (age 26)
- Place of birth: Lascano, Uruguay
- Height: 1.84 m (6 ft 0 in)
- Position: Forward

Youth career
- Peñarol

Senior career*
Years	Team	Apps	(Gls)
2021–2022	Peñarol	7	(0)
2022	→ Cerro Largo (loan)	5	(0)
2022	→ Cerrito (loan)	2	(0)

International career
2015	Uruguay U15	16	(2)
- * Club domestic league appearances and goals as of 1 January 2023

Álvaro Nicolás García Silvera (born 5 October 2000) is a Uruguayan professional footballer who plays as a forward.

== Club career ==
A youth academy graduate of Peñarol, García made his professional debut on 22 May 2021 in a goalless draw against Fénix. On 4 February 2022, he joined Cerro Largo on a season long loan deal.

== International career ==
García is a former Uruguay youth international. He was part of Uruguay squad which finished as runners-up at 2015 South American U-15 Championship.

== Career statistics ==
=== Club ===
As of 25 November 2021

Appearances and goals by club, season and competition
Club	Season	League			Cup		Continental		Other		Total	
Club	Season	Division	Apps	Goals	Apps	Goals	Apps	Goals	Apps	Goals	Apps	Goals
Peñarol	2021	Uruguayan Primera División	7	0	—		1 (Note: Appearance in Copa Sudamericana.)	0	0	0	8	0
Career total			7	0	0	0	1	0	0	0	8	0

== Honours ==
Peñarol

- Uruguayan Primera División: 2021
