= Joe Balsamo =

Italian-American football manager

Personal information
- Full name: Giuseppe Balsamo
- Place of birth: Switzerland

Senior career*
Years	Team	Apps	(Gls)
- San Diego Sockers

Managerial career
- 2007–2010: Brooklyn Knights
- * Club domestic league appearances and goals

Joe Balsamo is an Italian-American football manager. He is currently the head coach for the Brooklyn Knights' PDL squad.

== Biography ==
=== Early life and education ===
Giuseppe (Joe) Balsamo was born in Switzerland and grew up in Palermo, Sicily.

=== Football career ===
Joe became a professional player at the Primavera level at age 16, and came to the United States at 17 to play in the North American Soccer League. He returned to Italy to play in the Italian Serie C for coach Giovanni Seghedoni. In 1989, Joe returned to the United States and settled in Bensonhurst, Brooklyn.

Joe’s coaching accomplishments include many championships and titles at various age levels, including, in 2002, the championship of the Enzo Ferrari Cup in Italy, where his side defeated the squads of Juventus and Modena. He also coached the United States representative team at the 2003 Danone Cup in Paris.

Joe now is the president and head coach of F.A. Euro. Joe is the current coach of F.A. Euro's Professional Development League team (PDL).

=== Family life ===
Joe and his wife, Lisa, have two boys, Marco and Vincent. Marco is a college student pursuing film and Vincent who is in junior high school. They live happily in Brooklyn, NY.
