= 2024 in American soccer =

Soccer in the United States
- Season: 2024

Men's soccer
- Supporters' Shield: Inter Miami CF
- USL Championship: Colorado Springs Switchbacks FC
- USL League One: Union Omaha
- NISA: Los Angeles Force
- MLS Next Pro: North Texas SC
- NPSL: El Farolito SC
- USL League Two: Seacoast United Phantoms
- US Open Cup: Los Angeles FC
- MLS Cup: LA Galaxy

Women's soccer
- NWSL: Orlando Pride
- NWSL Shield: Orlando Pride
- WPSL: California Storm
- UWS: Santa Clarita Blue Heat
- NWSL Challenge Cup: San Diego Wave FC

The 2024 season was the 112th season of competitive soccer in the United States. The season began with friendlies for the USMNT and USWNT in January and February. The USMNT competed in the 2023–24 CONCACAF Nations League, winning for the third straight time, and also competed as the host of the 2024 Copa América. The USWNT competed in the inaugural 2024 CONCACAF W Gold Cup, becoming the first champions of the cup.

At the international level, qualifying MLS clubs competed in the 2024 CONCACAF Champions Cup, and qualifying NWSL clubs are competing in the inaugural 2024–25 CONCACAF W Champions Cup.

== National teams ==
=== Men's ===
==== Senior ====
As of November 18, 2024.

Wins	Losses	Draws
6	6	2

===== Friendlies =====
January 20	United States	0–1	Slovenia	San Antonio, Texas
15:00 ET		Report	Gradišar 26'	Stadium: Toyota Field; Attendance: 9,191; Referee: Pierre Luc Lauziere (Canada)

June 8	United States	1–5	Colombia	Landover, Maryland
17:30 ET	Weah 58'	Report	Arias 6'; Borré 19'; Ríos 77'; Carrascal 85'; Sinisterra 88'	Stadium: Commanders Field; Attendance: 55,494; Referee: Fernando Hernández Gómez (Mexico)

September 7	United States	1–2	Canada	Kansas City, Kansas
16:05 ET	de la Torre 66'	Report	Shaffelburg 17'; David 58'	Stadium: Children's Mercy Park; Attendance: 10,523; Referee: Keylor Herrera (Costa Rica

September 10	United States	1–1	New Zealand	Cincinnati, Ohio
19:00 ET	Pulisic 69'	Report	Waine 89'	Stadium: TQL Stadium; Attendance: 15,711; Referee: Selvin Brown (Honduras)

October 12	United States	2–0	Panama	Austin, Texas
21:00 ET	Musah 49'; Pepi 90+4'	Report		Stadium: Q2 Stadium; Attendance: 20,239; Referee: Katia Itzel García (Mexico)

October 15	Mexico	2–0	United States	Zapopan, Mexico
22:30 ET	Jiménez 22'; Huerta 49'	Report		Stadium: Estadio Akron; Attendance: 43,537; Referee: Keylor Herrera (Costa Rica)

===== 2023–24 CONCACAF Nations League =====
March 21 SF	United States	3–1 (a.e.t.)	Jamaica	Arlington, Texas
19:00 ET	Burke 90+6' (o.g.); Wright 96', 109'	Report	Leigh 1'	Stadium: AT&T Stadium; Attendance: 40,926; Referee: Selvin Brown (Honduras)

March 24 F	United States	2–0	Mexico	Arlington, Texas
21:15 ET	Adams 45'; Reyna 63'	Report		Stadium: AT&T Stadium; Attendance: 59,471; Referee: Drew Fischer (Canada)

===== Continental Clásico =====
June 12	United States	1–1	Brazil	Orlando, Florida
19:00 ET	Pulisic 26'	Report	Rodrygo 17'	Stadium: Camping World Stadium; Attendance: 60,016; Referee: Saíd Martínez (Honduras)

===== 2024 Copa América =====
====== Group C ======
Pos	Team	Pld	W	D	L	GF	GA	GD	Pts	Qualification
1	Uruguay	3	3	0	0	9	1	+8	9	Advance to knockout stage
2	Panama	3	2	0	1	6	5	+1	6	Advance to knockout stage
3	United States (H)	3	1	0	2	3	3	0	3	
4	Bolivia	3	0	0	3	1	10	−9	0	

Source: CONMEBOL
(H) Hosts

June 23	United States	2–0	Bolivia	Arlington, Texas
17:00 CDT	Pulisic 3'; Balogun 44'	Report		Stadium: AT&T Stadium; Attendance: 47,873; Referee: Maurizio Mariani (Italy)

June 27	Panama	2–1	United States	Atlanta, Georgia
18:00 EDT	Blackman 26'; Fajardo 83'	Report	Balogun 22'	Stadium: Mercedes-Benz Stadium; Attendance: 59,145; Referee: Iván Barton (El Salvador)

July 1	United States	0–1	Uruguay	Kansas City, Missouri
20:00 CDT		Report	M. Olivera 66'	Stadium: Arrowhead Stadium; Attendance: 55,460; Referee: Kevin Ortega (Peru)

===== 2024–25 CONCACAF Nations League =====
====== Quarterfinals ======
Team 1	Agg.	Team 2	1st leg	2nd leg
Jamaica	2–5	United States	0–1	2–4

November 14 1st Leg QF	Jamaica	0–1	United States	Kingston, Jamaica
20:00 ET		Report	Pepi 5'	Stadium: Independence Park; Attendance: 25,500; Referee: Juan Gabriel Calderon (Costa Rica)

November 18 2nd Leg QF	United States	4–2 (5–2 agg.)	Jamaica	St. Louis, Missouri
20:00 ET	Pulisic 14'; Bernard 33' (o.g.); Pepi 42'; Weah 56'	Report	D. Gray 53', 68'	Stadium: Energizer Park; Attendance: 21,080; Referee: Mario Escobar (Guatemala)
Note: Advance on aggregate 5–2

===== Goalscorers =====
Player	Goals
Christian Pulisic	4
Ricardo Pepi	3
Folarin Balogun	2
Timothy Weah	2
Haji Wright	2
Tyler Adams	1
Luca de la Torre	1
Yunus Musah	1
Giovanni Reyna	1
own goal	2
Total	19

==== U–23 ====
===== Friendlies =====
March 22	United States	3–0	Guinea	Olot, Spain
11:00 ET	Harriel 9'; Busio 45+1'; Gomez 51'	Report		Stadium: Nou Estadi Municipal; Attendance: 60; Referee: Jan Cobos Pujol (Spain)

March 25	France	2–2	United States	Montbéliard, France
15:00 ET				Stadium: Stade Bonal

June 11	United States	0–2	Japan	Kansas City, Kansas
20:00 ET				Stadium: Children's Mercy Park

===== 2024 Summer Olympics =====
====== Group A ======
Pos	Team	Pld	W	D	L	GF	GA	GD	Pts	Qualification
1	France (H)	3	3	0	0	7	0	+7	9	Advance to knockout stage
2	United States	3	2	0	1	7	4	+3	6	Advance to knockout stage
3	New Zealand	3	1	0	2	3	8	−5	3	
4	Guinea	3	0	0	3	1	6	−5	0	

Source: FIFA
Rules for classification: Group stage tiebreakers
(H) Hosts

July 24	France	3–0	United States	Marseille, France
15:00 ET	Lacazette 61'; Olise 69'; Badé 85'	Report		Stadium: Stade de Marseille; Attendance: 48,721; Referee: Yael Falcón (Argentina)

July 27	New Zealand	1–4	United States	Marseille, France
13:00 ET	Randall 78'	Report	Mihailovic 10' (pen.); Zimmerman 12'; Busio 30'; Aaronson 58'	Stadium: Stade de Marseille; Referee: Glenn Nyberg (Sweden)

July 30	United States	3–0	Guinea	Saint-Étienne, France
13:00 ET	Mihailovic 14'; Paredes 31', 75'	Report		Stadium: Stade Geoffroy-Guichard; Referee: Tess Olofsson (Sweden)

====== Knockout stage ======
August 2	Morocco	4–0	United States	Paris, France
09:00 ET	Rahimi 29' (pen.); Akhomach 63'; Hakimi 70'; Maouhoub 90+1' (pen.)	Report		Stadium: Parc des Princes; Referee: Yael Falcón (Argentina)

==== U–20 ====
===== CONCACAF U-20 Championship =====
====== Group A ======
Pos	Team	Pld	W	D	L	GF	GA	GD	Pts	Qualification
1	United States	3	3	0	0	14	0	+14	9	Advance to knockout stage
2	Costa Rica	3	1	1	1	4	2	+2	4	Advance to knockout stage
3	Cuba	3	1	1	1	4	5	−1	4	Advance to knockout stage
4	Jamaica	3	0	0	3	0	15	−15	0	

Source: CONCACAF
Rules for classification: tiebreakers

July 19	United States	9–0	Jamaica	Celaya, Mexico
	Vazquez 2', 3'; Soma 16', 20'; Medina 39'; Zambrano 54'; Ramos 67'; Berchimas 77'; Tsakiris 90+1'	Report		Stadium: Estadio Miguel Alemán Valdés; Referee: Adonis Carrasco (Dominican Republic)

July 22	Cuba	0–4	United States	Celaya, Mexico
		Report	Kohler 15'; Gozo 26'; Habroune 58'; Zambrano 90+1'	Stadium: Estadio Miguel Alemán Valdés; Referee: Filip Dujic (Canada)

July 26	United States	1–0	Costa Rica	Celaya, Mexico
	Tsakiris 37'	Report		Stadium: Estadio Miguel Alemán Valdés; Referee: Jefferson Escobar (Honduras)

====== Knockout stage ======
July 30 QF	United States	1–0	Guatemala	León, Mexico
	Ramos 49'	Report		Stadium: Estadio Nou Camp; Referee: Fernando Hernández (Mexico)

August 2 SF	United States	2–1	Panama	León, Mexico
	Vazquez 40'; Raines 86'	Report	Mosquera 72' (pen.)	Stadium: Estadio Nou Camp; Referee: David Gómez (Costa Rica)

August 4 F	United States	1–2 (a.e.t.)	Mexico	León, Mexico
				Stadium: Estadio Nou Camp

==== Beach ====
===== FIFA Beach Soccer World Cup =====
====== Group A ======
Pos	Team	Pld	W	W+	WP	L	GF	GA	GD	Pts	Qualification
1	Italy	3	2	0	0	1	9	3	+6	6	Knockout stage
2	United Arab Emirates (H)	3	1	1	1	0	5	3	+2	6	Knockout stage
3	Egypt	3	0	1	0	2	8	12	−4	2	
4	United States	3	0	0	0	3	7	11	−4	0	

Source: FIFA
Rules for classification: Tiebreakers
(H) Host

February 15	United States	1–3	Italy	Dubai, United Arab Emirates
6:30 ET	Rezende 11'	Report	Josep Jr. 2'; Zurlo 12'; Giordani 20'	Stadium: Dubai Design District Stadium; Attendance: 711; Referee: Mariano Romo (Argentina)

February 17	United Arab Emirates	3–2 (a.e.t.)	United States	Dubai, United Arab Emirates
10:30 ET	Eid 16'; Abbas 24'; Ali 39' (e.t.)	Report	Toth 27'; Canale 36'	Stadium: Dubai Design District Stadium; Attendance: 3,127; Referee: Vladimir Tashkov (Bulgaria)

February 19	Egypt	5–4 (a.e.t.)	United States	Dubai, United Arab Emirates
6:30 ET	Paulo 10', 11', 30'; Elshahat 33' (pen.); Taha 38' (e.t.)	Report	Canale 10', 16'; Collier 16'; Navas 24'	Stadium: Dubai Design District Stadium; Attendance: 749; Referee: Eduards Borisēvičs (Latvia)

=== Women's ===
==== Senior ====
As of December 3, 2024.

Wins	Losses	Draws
18	1	4

===== Friendlies =====
June 1	United States	4–0	South Korea	Commerce City, Colorado
17:00 ET	Swanson 34', 74'; Davidson 38', 48'	Report		Stadium: Dick's Sporting Goods Park; Attendance: 19,010; Referee: Carly Shaw-MacLaren (Canada)

June 4	United States	3–0	South Korea	St. Paul, Minnesota
20:00 ET	Dunn 13'; Smith 67'; Yohannes 82'	Report		Stadium: Allianz Field; Attendance: 19,169; Referee: Astrid Azucena Gramajo (Guatemala)

July 13	United States	1–0	Mexico	Harrison, New Jersey
15:30 ET	Smith 67'	Report		Stadium: Red Bull Arena; Attendance: 26,376; Referee: Deily Maria Gomez Espinoza (Costa Rica)

July 16	United States	0–0	Costa Rica	Washington, D.C.
19:30 ET		Report		Stadium: Audi Field; Attendance: 18,972; Referee: Lizzet Amairany Garcia Olvera (Mexico)

October 24	United States	3–1	Iceland	Austin, Texas
19:30 ET	Thompson 39'; Shaw 85'; Smith 89'	Report	Magnúsdóttir 56'	Stadium: Q2 Stadium; Attendance: 18,580; Referee: Odette Hamilton (Jamaica)

October 27	United States	3–1	Iceland	Nashville, Tennessee
17:30 ET	Williams 72'; Horan 76'; Sears 90+3'	Report	Vilhjálmsdóttir 31'	Stadium: Geodis Park; Attendance: 17,018; Referee: Melissa Borjas (Honduras)

October 30	United States	3–0	Argentina	Louisville, Kentucky
19:07 ET	Girma 37', 49'; Cometti 44' (o.g.)	Report		Stadium: Lynn Family Stadium; Attendance: 13,543; Referee: Karen Hernández Andrade (Mexico)

November 30	England	0–0	United States	London, England
12:20 ET		Report		Stadium: Wembley Stadium; Attendance: 78,346; Referee: Lina Lehtovaara (Finland)

December 3	Netherlands	1–2	United States	The Hague, Netherlands
14:45 ET	Buurman 15'	Report	Buurman 44' (o.g.); Williams 71'	Stadium: ADO Den Haag Stadium; Attendance: 12,503; Referee: María Eugenia Gil Soriano (Spain)

===== CONCACAF W Gold Cup =====
====== Group A ======
Pos	Team	Pld	W	D	L	GF	GA	GD	Pts	Qualification
1	Mexico	3	2	1	0	10	0	+10	7	Advance to knockout stage
2	United States (H)	3	2	0	1	9	2	+7	6	Advance to knockout stage
3	Argentina	3	1	1	1	3	4	−1	4	Advance to knockout stage
4	Dominican Republic	3	0	0	3	0	16	−16	0	

Source: CONCACAF
Rules for classification: Tiebreakers
(H) Hosts

February 20	United States	5–0	Dominican Republic	Carson, California
22:15 ET	Moultrie 7', 58'; Williams 30'; Nighswonger 86' (pen.); Morgan 90+2' (pen.)	Report	Reed (yellow card) 85'	Stadium: Dignity Health Sports Park; Attendance: 3,242; Referee: Astrid Gramajo (Guatemala)

February 23	Argentina	0–4	United States	Carson, California
22:15 ET	Mayorga (yellow card) 45+5' (red card) 75'; Cometti (yellow card) 65'	Report	Shaw 10', 18', (yellow card) 58'; Morgan 19'; Horan 77' (pen.)	Stadium: Dignity Health Sports Park; Attendance: 8,315; Referee: Marie-Soleil Beaudoin (Canada)

February 26	United States	0–2	Mexico	Carson, California
22:15 ET		Report	Ovalle (yellow card) 29', (goal) 38'; Luna (yellow card) 88'; Pelayo 90+2'	Stadium: Dignity Health Sports Park; Attendance: 11,612; Referee: Melissa Borjas (Honduras)

====== Knockout Stage ======
March 3 QF	United States	3–0	Colombia	Los Angeles, California
20:15 ET	Horan 13' (pen.); Nighswonger 22'; Shaw 45+2'	Report		Stadium: BMO Stadium; Attendance: 16,746; Referee: Marianela Araya (Costa Rica)

March 6 SF	Canada	2–2 (a.e.t.) (1–3 p)	United States	San Diego, California
19:00 ET	Huitema 82'; Leon 120+7' (pen.)	Report	Shaw 20'; Smith 99'	Stadium: Snapdragon Stadium; Attendance: 15,245; Referee: Katia García (Mexico)
	Penalties
	Leon (penalty missed); Huitema (penalty missed); Quinn (penalty scored); Fleming (penalty missed)		(penalty scored) Smith; (penalty missed) Albert; (penalty scored) Naeher; (penalty scored) Horan

March 10 F	United States	1–0	Brazil	San Diego, California
20:15 ET	Horan 45+1'	Report		Stadium: Snapdragon Stadium; Attendance: 31,528; Referee: Melissa Borjas (Honduras)

===== SheBelieves Cup =====
Semi-finals
April 6 – Atlanta, Georgia
United States	2
Japan	1
April 6 – Atlanta, Georgia
Brazil	1 (2)
Canada (p)	1 (4)

Final
April 9 – Columbus, Ohio
United States (p)	2 (5)
Canada	2 (4)
Third place
April 9 – Columbus, Ohio
Japan	1 (0)
Brazil (p)	1 (3)

April 6 SF	United States	2–1	Japan	Atlanta, Georgia
12:30 ET	Shaw 21'; Horan 77' (pen.)	Report	Seike 1'	Stadium: Mercedes-Benz Stadium; Attendance: 50,644; Referee: Myriam Marcotte (Canada)

April 9 F	United States	2–2 (5–4 p)	Canada	Columbus, Ohio
19:00 ET	Smith 50', 68'	Report	Leon 40', 86' (pen.)	Stadium: Lower.com Field; Attendance: 19,049; Referee: Crystal Sobers (Trinidad and Tobago)
	Penalties
	Rodman (penalty missed); Smith (penalty scored); Naeher (penalty scored); Horan (penalty scored); Sonnett (penalty missed); Dahlkemper (penalty scored); Fox (penalty scored)		(penalty scored) Fleming; (penalty scored) Leon; (penalty missed) Rose; (penalty missed) Lacasse; (penalty scored) Grosso; (penalty scored) Lawrence; (penalty missed) Viens

===== 2024 Summer Olympics =====
====== Group B ======
Pos	Team	Pld	W	D	L	GF	GA	GD	Pts	Qualification
1	United States	3	3	0	0	9	2	+7	9	Advance to knockout stage
2	Germany	3	2	0	1	8	5	+3	6	Advance to knockout stage
3	Australia	3	1	0	2	7	10	−3	3	
4	Zambia	3	0	0	3	6	13	−7	0	

Source: FIFA

July 25	United States	3–0	Zambia	Nice, France
15:00 ET	Rodman 17'; Swanson 24', 25'	Report		Stadium: Stade de Nice; Attendance: 5,550; Referee: Ramon Abatti (Brazil)

July 28	United States	4–1	Germany	Marseille, France
15:00 ET	Smith 11', 44'; Swanson 26'; Williams 89'	Report	Gwinn 22'	Stadium: Stade de Marseille; Attendance: 9,379; Referee: Yael Falcón (Argentina)

July 31	Australia	1–2	United States	Marseille, France
13:00 ET	Kennedy 90+2'	Report	Rodman 43'; Albert 77'	Stadium: Stade de Marseille; Attendance: 9,610; Referee: François Letexier (France)

====== Knockout stage ======
August 3 QF	United States	1–0 (a.e.t.)	Japan	Paris, France
09:00 ET	Rodman 105+2'	Report		Stadium: Parc des Princes; Attendance: 43,004; Referee: Tess Olofsson (Sweden)

August 6 SF	United States	1–0 (a.e.t.)	Germany	Décines-Charpieu, France
12:00 ET	Smith 95'	Report		Stadium: Stade de Lyon; Attendance: 15,107; Referee: Bouchra Karboubi (Morocco)

Gold Medal

10 August 2024
17:00

Brazil	0–1	United States
	Report	Swanson 57'

Parc des Princes, Paris
Attendance: 43,813
Referee: Tess Olofsson (Sweden)

===== Goalscorers =====
Player	Goals
Sophia Smith	9
Jaedyn Shaw	6
Mallory Swanson	6
Lindsey Horan	5
Lynn Williams	4
Trinity Rodman	3
Tierna Davidson	2
Naomi Girma	2
Alex Morgan	2
Olivia Moultrie	2
Jenna Nighswonger	2
Korbin Albert	1
Crystal Dunn	1
Emma Sears	1
Alyssa Thompson	1
Lily Yohannes	1
own goal	2
Total	50

==== U–20 ====
===== 2024 FIFA U-20 Women's World Cup =====
====== Group C ======
Pos	Team	Pld	W	D	L	GF	GA	GD	Pts	Qualification
1	Spain	3	3	0	0	5	0	+5	9	Knockout stage
2	United States	3	2	0	1	9	1	+8	6	Knockout stage
3	Paraguay	3	1	0	2	2	9	−7	3	
4	Morocco	3	0	0	3	0	6	−6	0	

Source: FIFA
Rules for classification: Group stage tiebreakers

September 1	Spain	1–0	United States	Cali, Colombia
14:00 ET		Report		Stadium: Estadio Pascual Guerrero

September 4	Morocco	0–2	United States	Cali, Colombia
19:00 ET		Report		Stadium: Estadio Pascual Guerrero

September 7	United States	7–0	Paraguay	Bogotá, Colombia
17:00 ET		Report		Stadium: Estadio El Techo

====== Knockout stage ======
September 11 R16	Mexico	2–3 (a.e.t.)	United States	Bogotá, Colombia
	Vargas 22'; Saldívar 39'	Report	Tordin 10'; Sentnor 27'; Dudley 97'	Stadium: Estadio El Campín; Attendance: 4,352; Referee: Iuliana Demetrescu (Romania)

September 15 QF	United States	2–2 (a.e.t.) (3–1 p)	Germany	Cali, Colombia
18:00	Dudley 90+8'; Sentnor 90+9'	Report	Zicai 61' (pen.); Bender 90+2'	Stadium: Estadio Pascual Guerrero; Referee: Oh Hyeon-jeong (South Korea)
	Penalties
	Sentnor (penalty scored); Klenke (penalty scored); Jackson (penalty scored)		(penalty scored) Veit; (penalty missed) Platner; (penalty missed) Diehm; (penalty missed) Şehitler

September 18 SF	United States	0–1	North Korea	Cali, Colombia
16:30		Report	Choe Il-son 22'	Stadium: Estadio Pascual Guerrero; Referee: Ivana Martinčić (Croatia)

September 21 3rd	United States	2–1 (a.e.t.)	Netherlands	Bogotá, Colombia
	Sentnor 10'; Buikema 119' (o.g.)	Report	Lacroix 26'	Stadium: Estadio El Campín; Referee: Shahenda El-Maghrabi (Egypt)

==== U–17 ====
===== CONCACAF Women's U-17 Championship =====
====== Group B ======
Pos	Team	Pld	W	D	L	GF	GA	GD	Pts	Qualification
1	United States	3	3	0	0	21	1	+20	9	Knockout stage
2	Canada	3	2	0	1	10	6	+4	6	Knockout stage
3	Panama	3	1	0	2	5	20	−15	3	
4	Puerto Rico	3	0	0	3	3	12	−9	0	

Source: CONCACAF

February 2	United States	13–0	Panama	Toluca, Mexico
13:00 ET	Townes 8', 19'; Pfeiffer 16', 21', 35' (pen.); Fuller 36', 42', 56', 66', 78'; McLanahan 68'; Hardeman 75'; Scott 80'	Report		Stadium: Campo 2 - FMF; Referee: Deily Gomez (Costa Rica)

February 4	Puerto Rico	1–3	United States	Toluca, Mexico
13:00 ET	Maldonado 32'	Report	Helfrich 28'; Travers 31' (pen.); Townes 67'	Stadium: Campo 2 - FMF; Referee: Neressa Goldson (Jamaica)

February 6	United States	5–0	Canada	Toluca, Mexico
13:00 ET		Report		Stadium: Campo 2 - FMF

====== Knockout Stage ======
February 9 SF	United States	7–1	Haiti	Toluca, Mexico
13:00 ET	Townes 24'; Fuller 40', 48'; Pfeiffer 59'; Ascanio 83', 85', 87'	Report	Etienne 78' (pen.)	Stadium: Campo 1 - FMF; Referee: Neressa Goldson (Jamaica)

February 11 F	Mexico	0–4	United States	Toluca, Mexico
16:00 ET		Report	Townes 11'; Ascanio 23'; González 28' (o.g.); Pfeiffer 62'	Stadium: Campo 1 - FMF; Referee: Vimarest Díaz (Dominican Republic)

===== FIFA U-17 Women's World Cup =====
====== Group B ======
Pos	Team	Pld	W	D	L	GF	GA	GD	Pts	Qualification
1	Spain	3	3	0	0	10	2	+8	9	Knockout stage
2	United States	3	2	0	1	8	3	+5	6	Knockout stage
3	Colombia	3	0	1	2	2	5	−3	1	
4	South Korea	3	0	1	2	1	11	−10	1	

Source: FIFA
Rules for classification: Group stage tiebreakers

October 16	Spain	3–1	United States	Santo Domingo, Dominican Republic
--:-- ET	Travers 3' (o.g.); Ortega 70'; Cerrato 83'	Report	Barcenas 22'	Stadium: Estadio Félix Sánchez; Referee: Asaka Koizumi (Japan)

October 19	Colombia	0–2	United States	Santo Domingo, Dominican Republic
--:-- ET		Report		Stadium: Estadio Félix Sánchez

October 22	United States	5–0	South Korea	Santiago de los Caballeros, Dominican Republic
--:-- ET		Report		Stadium: Estadio Cibao Universitario

====== Knockout stage ======
October 26 QF	Nigeria	2–0	United States	Santiago de los Caballeros, Dominican Republic
		Report	Fuller 43' (pen.); Ascanio 74'	Stadium: Estadio Cibao FC; Referee: Asaka Koizumi (Japan)

October 30 SF	United States	0–1	North Korea	Santiago de los Caballeros, Dominican Republic
		Report	Ro Un-hyang 69'	Stadium: Estadio Cibao FC; Referee: Alina Peșu (Romania)

November 3 3rd	United States	3–0	England	Santo Domingo, Dominican Republic
				Stadium: Estadio Félix Sánchez

== Club competitions ==
=== Men's ===
==== League competitions ====
===== Major League Soccer =====
====== Conference tables ======
Eastern Conference

MLS Eastern Conference table (2024)
Pos	Team	Pld	W	L	T	GF	GA	GD	Pts	Qualification
1	Inter Miami CF	34	22	4	8	79	49	+30	74	Qualification for round one, the Leagues Cup and the CONCACAF Champions Cup round one
2	Columbus Crew	34	19	6	9	72	40	+32	66	Qualification for round one and the Leagues Cup
3	FC Cincinnati	34	18	11	5	58	48	+10	59	Qualification for round one and the Leagues Cup
4	Orlando City SC	34	15	12	7	59	50	+9	52	Qualification for round one and the Leagues Cup
5	Charlotte FC	34	14	11	9	46	37	+9	51	Qualification for round one and the Leagues Cup
6	New York City FC	34	14	12	8	54	49	+5	50	Qualification for round one and the Leagues Cup
7	New York Red Bulls	34	11	9	14	55	50	+5	47	Qualification for round one and the Leagues Cup
8	CF Montréal	34	11	13	10	48	64	−16	43	Qualification for the wild card round and the Leagues Cup
9	Atlanta United FC	34	10	14	10	46	49	−3	40	Qualification for the wild card round and the Leagues Cup
10	D.C. United	34	10	14	10	52	70	−18	40	
11	Toronto FC	34	11	19	4	40	61	−21	37	
12	Philadelphia Union	34	9	15	10	62	55	+7	37	
13	Nashville SC	34	9	16	9	38	54	−16	36	
14	New England Revolution	34	9	21	4	37	74	−37	31	
15	Chicago Fire FC	34	7	18	9	40	62	−22	30	

Source: MLS
Rules for classification: 1) points; 2) total wins; 3) total goal differential; 4) total goals scored; 5) fewer disciplinary points; 6) away goal differential; 7) away goals scored; 8) home goals differential; 9) home goals scored; 10) coin toss (2 clubs tied) or drawing of lots (≥3 clubs tied)

Western Conference

MLS Western Conference table (2024)
Pos	Team	Pld	W	L	T	GF	GA	GD	Pts	Qualification
1	Los Angeles FC	34	19	8	7	63	43	+20	64	Qualification for round one, the Leagues Cup and the CONCACAF Champions Cup round one
2	LA Galaxy	34	19	8	7	69	50	+19	64	Qualification for round one and the Leagues Cup
3	Real Salt Lake	34	16	7	11	65	48	+17	59	Qualification for round one and the Leagues Cup
4	Seattle Sounders FC	34	16	9	9	51	35	+16	57	Qualification for round one and the Leagues Cup
5	Houston Dynamo FC	34	15	10	9	47	39	+8	54	Qualification for round one and the Leagues Cup
6	Minnesota United FC	34	15	12	7	58	49	+9	52	Qualification for round one and the Leagues Cup
7	Colorado Rapids	34	15	14	5	61	60	+1	50	Qualification for round one and the Leagues Cup
8	Vancouver Whitecaps FC	34	13	13	8	52	49	+3	47	Qualification for the wild card round (Note: Vancouver Whitecaps FC did not qualify for the Leagues Cup due to winning the 2024 Canadian Championship, giving them a place in the 2025 CONCACAF Champions Cup. As MLS teams could participate in no more than two cup competitions, their spot in the Leagues Cup was given to San Diego FC.)
9	Portland Timbers	34	12	11	11	65	56	+9	47	Qualification for the wild card round and the Leagues Cup
10	Austin FC	34	11	14	9	39	48	−9	42	
11	FC Dallas	34	11	15	8	54	56	−2	41	
12	St. Louis City SC	34	8	13	13	50	63	−13	37	
13	Sporting Kansas City	34	8	19	7	51	66	−15	31	
14	San Jose Earthquakes	34	6	25	3	41	78	−37	21	

Source: MLS
Rules for classification: 1) points; 2) total wins; 3) total goal differential; 4) total goals scored; 5) fewer disciplinary points; 6) away goal differential; 7) away goals scored; 8) home goals differential; 9) home goals scored; 10) coin toss (2 clubs tied) or drawing of lots (≥3 clubs tied)

====== Overall 2024 table ======
Note: the table below has no impact on playoff qualification and is used solely for determining host of the MLS Cup, certain CCL spots, the Supporters' Shield trophy, seeding in the 2025 Canadian Championship, and 2024 MLS draft. The conference tables are the sole determinant for teams qualifying for the playoffs.

Overall MLS standings table
Pos	Team	Pld	W	L	T	GF	GA	GD	Pts	Qualification
1	Inter Miami CF (S)	34	22	4	8	79	49	+30	74	Qualification for the FIFA Club World Cup group stage and the CONCACAF Champions Cup round one (Note: As 2024 MLS Supporters' Shield champions)
2	Columbus Crew (L)	34	19	6	9	72	40	+32	66	Qualification for the CONCACAF Champions Cup round of 16 (Note: As winners of Leagues Cup)
3	Los Angeles FC (U)	34	19	8	7	63	43	+20	64	Qualification for the CONCACAF Champions Cup round one (Note: As runners-up of Leagues Cup)
4	LA Galaxy (C)	34	19	8	7	69	50	+19	64	Qualification for the CONCACAF Champions Cup round of 16 (Note: As 2024 MLS Cup champions)
5	FC Cincinnati	34	18	11	5	58	48	+10	59	Qualification for the CONCACAF Champions Cup round one (Note: As highest-ranked club in 2024 MLS Supporters' Shield not already qualified)
6	Real Salt Lake	34	16	7	11	65	48	+17	59	Qualification for the CONCACAF Champions Cup round one (Note: As second highest-ranked club in 2024 MLS Supporters' Shield not already qualified)
7	Seattle Sounders FC	34	16	9	9	51	35	+16	57	Qualification for the CONCACAF Champions Cup round one (Note: As third highest-ranked club in 2024 MLS Supporters' Shield not already qualified)
8	Houston Dynamo FC	34	15	10	9	47	39	+8	54	Qualification for the U.S. Open Cup round of 32 (Note: As one of the best U.S. teams in the overall table to not qualify for the 2025 CONCACAF Champions Cup)
9	Orlando City SC	34	15	12	7	59	50	+9	52	Qualification for the U.S. Open Cup round of 32
10	Minnesota United FC	34	15	12	7	58	49	+9	52	Qualification for the U.S. Open Cup round of 32
11	Charlotte FC	34	14	11	9	46	37	+9	51	Qualification for the U.S. Open Cup round of 32
12	Colorado Rapids	34	15	14	5	61	60	+1	50	Qualification for the CONCACAF Champions Cup round one (Note: As third place of Leagues Cup)
13	New York City FC	34	14	12	8	54	49	+5	50	Qualification for the U.S. Open Cup round of 32
14	Vancouver Whitecaps FC (V)	34	13	13	8	52	49	+3	47	Qualification for the CONCACAF Champions Cup round one (Note: As winners of Canadian Championship)
15	Portland Timbers	34	12	11	11	65	56	+9	47	Qualification for the U.S. Open Cup round of 32
16	New York Red Bulls	34	11	9	14	55	50	+5	47	Qualification for the U.S. Open Cup round of 32
17	CF Montréal	34	11	13	10	48	64	−16	43	
18	Austin FC	34	11	14	9	39	48	−9	42	Qualification for the U.S. Open Cup round of 32 (Note: As one of the U.S. teams who did not qualify for the 2025 CONCACAF Champions Cup or the 2025 Leagues Cup)
19	FC Dallas	34	11	15	8	54	56	−2	41	Qualification for the U.S. Open Cup round of 32
20	Atlanta United FC	34	10	14	10	46	49	−3	40	
21	D.C. United	34	10	14	10	52	70	−18	40	Qualification for the U.S. Open Cup round of 32
22	Toronto FC	34	11	19	4	40	61	−21	37	
23	Philadelphia Union	34	9	15	10	62	55	+7	37	Qualification for the U.S. Open Cup round of 32
24	St. Louis City SC	34	8	13	13	50	63	−13	37	Qualification for the U.S. Open Cup round of 32
25	Nashville SC	34	9	16	9	38	54	−16	36	Qualification for the U.S. Open Cup round of 32
26	New England Revolution	34	9	21	4	37	74	−37	31	Qualification for the U.S. Open Cup round of 32
27	Sporting Kansas City	34	8	19	7	51	66	−15	31	Qualification for the CONCACAF Champions Cup round one (Note: Sporting Kansas City qualified as 2024 U.S. Open Cup finalists as the winners, Los Angeles FC, had already qualified via the 2024 Leagues Cup.)
28	Chicago Fire FC	34	7	18	9	40	62	−22	30	Qualification for the U.S. Open Cup round of 32
29	San Jose Earthquakes	34	6	25	3	41	78	−37	21	Qualification for the U.S. Open Cup round of 32

Source: MLS
Rules for classification: 1) points; 2) total wins; 3) total goal differential; 4) total goals scored; 5) fewer disciplinary points; 6) away goal differential; 7) away goals scored; 8) home goals differential; 9) home goals scored; 10) coin toss (2 clubs tied) or drawing of lots (≥3 clubs tied)
(C) MLS Cup champions; (L) Leagues Cup winners; (S) Supporters' Shield winners; (U) U.S. Open Cup winners; (V) Canadian Championship winners

====== MLS Playoffs ======
Bracket

The higher seeded teams hosted single-elimination matches, with the MLS Cup host determined by overall points in the Supporters' Shield table. During the best-of-three round, the team with higher seed hosted the first match and the third match if necessary.

Wild card single match
E8	CF Montréal	2 (4)
E9	**Atlanta United FC**	**2 (5)**
W8	**Vancouver Whitecaps FC**	**5**
W9	Portland Timbers	0

Round one best-of-three series
E1	Inter Miami CF	**2**	1	2
E9	**Atlanta United FC**	1	**2**	**3**
E4	**Orlando City SC**	**2**	0 (1)	**1 (4)**
E5	Charlotte FC	0	**0 (3)**	1 (1)
E3	FC Cincinnati	**1**	1	0 (5)
E6	**New York City FC**	0	**3**	**0 (6)**
E2	Columbus Crew	0	2 (4)	–
E7	**New York Red Bulls**	**1**	**2 (5)**	–
W1	**Los Angeles FC**	**2**	0	**1**
W8	Vancouver Whitecaps FC	1	**3**	0
W4	**Seattle Sounders FC**	**0 (5)**	**1 (7)**	–
W5	Houston Dynamo FC	0 (4)	1 (6)	–
W3	Real Salt Lake	0 (4)	1 (1)	–
W6	**Minnesota United FC**	**0 (5)**	**1 (3)**	–
W2	**LA Galaxy**	**5**	**4**	–
W7	Colorado Rapids	0	1	–

Conference semifinals single match
E9	Atlanta United FC	0
E4	**Orlando City SC**	**1**
**Eastern Conference**
E6	New York City FC	0
E7	**New York Red Bulls**	**2**
W1	Los Angeles FC	1
W4	**Seattle Sounders FC** (a.e.t.)	**2**
**Western Conference**
W6	Minnesota United FC	2
W2	**LA Galaxy**	**6**

Conference finals single match
E4	Orlando City SC	0
E7	**New York Red Bulls**	**1**
W4	Seattle Sounders FC	0
W2	**LA Galaxy**	**1**

MLS Cup single match
E7	New York Red Bulls	1
W2	**LA Galaxy**	**2**

====== MLS Cup ======
December 7, 2024
1:10 p.m. PST

LA Galaxy	2–1	New York Red Bulls
Paintsil 9'; Joveljić 13'	Report	S. Nealis 28'

Dignity Health Sports Park, Carson, California
Attendance: 26,812
Referee: Guido Gonzales Jr.

====== MLS All-Star Game ======
2024 MLS All-Star Game
July 24, 2024
8:30 p.m. EDT

MLS All-Stars (United States Soccer Federation) (Canadian Soccer Association)	1–4	(Mexican Football Federation) Liga MX All-Stars
Hernández 17'	Report	Berterame 16'; Idrissi 41'; Brunetta 68'; Meza 69'

Lower.com Field, Columbus, Ohio
Attendance: 20,931
Referee: Guido Gonzales Jr. (United States)

===== USL Championship =====
====== Conference tables ======
Eastern Conference

Pos	Team	Pld	W	L	T	GF	GA	GD	Pts	Qualification
1	Louisville City FC (S)	34	24	6	4	86	43	+43	76	Playoffs
2	Charleston Battery	34	18	6	10	68	35	+33	64	Playoffs
3	Detroit City FC	34	15	8	11	46	32	+14	56	Playoffs
4	Indy Eleven	34	14	11	9	49	50	−1	51	Playoffs
5	Rhode Island FC	34	12	7	15	56	41	+15	51	Playoffs
6	Tampa Bay Rowdies	34	14	12	8	55	46	+9	50	Playoffs
7	Pittsburgh Riverhounds SC	34	12	10	12	41	28	+13	48	Playoffs
8	North Carolina FC	34	13	12	9	54	43	+11	48	Playoffs
9	Birmingham Legion FC	34	13	15	6	44	51	−7	45	
10	Hartford Athletic	34	12	14	8	39	52	−13	44	
11	Loudoun United FC	34	11	14	9	44	39	+5	42	
12	Miami FC	34	3	29	2	26	89	−63	11	

Source: USL Championship Standings
Rules for classification: 1) head-to-head points; 2) head-to-head goal differential; 3) points-per game within conference; 4) total wins; 5) total goal differential; 6) total goals scored; 7) points earned against top four Conference finishers; 8) disciplinary points; 9) coin toss or drawing of lots
(S) Players' Shield winner

Western Conference

Pos	Team	Pld	W	L	T	GF	GA	GD	Pts	Qualification
1	New Mexico United	34	18	11	5	46	44	+2	59	Playoffs
2	Colorado Springs Switchbacks FC (C)	34	15	12	7	48	40	+8	52	Playoffs
3	Memphis 901 FC	34	14	11	9	52	41	+11	51	Playoffs
4	Las Vegas Lights FC	34	13	10	11	49	46	+3	50	Playoffs
5	Sacramento Republic FC	34	13	11	10	46	34	+12	49	Playoffs
6	Orange County SC	34	13	14	7	38	45	−7	46	Playoffs
7	Oakland Roots SC	34	13	16	5	37	57	−20	44	Playoffs
8	Phoenix Rising FC	34	11	14	9	33	39	−6	42	Playoffs
9	San Antonio FC	34	10	15	9	36	49	−13	39	
10	FC Tulsa	34	9	14	11	33	48	−15	38	
11	Monterey Bay FC	34	8	16	10	29	44	−15	34	
12	El Paso Locomotive FC	34	8	18	8	27	46	−19	32	

Source: USL Championship Standings
Rules for classification: 1) head-to-head points; 2) head-to-head goal differential; 3) points-per game within conference; 4) total wins; 5) total goal differential; 6) total goals scored; 7) points earned against top four Conference finishers; 8) disciplinary points; 9) coin toss or drawing of lots
(C) Champions

====== USL Championship Playoffs ======
Bracket

Conference Quarterfinals; November 1–3	Conference Semifinals; November 9–10
**E1**	**Louisville City FC**	**3**
E8	North Carolina FC	2
E1	Louisville City FC	0
**E5**	**Rhode Island FC**	**3**
E4	Indy Eleven	2
**E5**	**Rhode Island FC**	**3**
**Eastern Conference**
E3	Detroit City FC	1 (1)
**E6**	**Tampa Bay Rowdies (p)**	**1 (3)**
E6	Tampa Bay Rowdies	1
**E2**	**Charleston Battery**	**2**
**E2**	**Charleston Battery**	**1**
E7	Pittsburgh Riverhounds SC	0
**W1**	**New Mexico United**	**2**
W8	Phoenix Rising FC	1
W1	New Mexico United	0
**W4**	**Las Vegas Lights FC**	**1**
**W4**	**Las Vegas Lights FC (p)**	**0 (3)**
W5	Sacramento Republic FC	0 (2)
**Western Conference**
W3	Memphis 901 FC	0
**W6**	**Orange County SC (a.e.t.)**	**1**
W6	Orange County SC	1
**W2**	**Colorado Springs Switchbacks FC (a.e.t.)**	**2**
**W2**	**Colorado Springs Switchbacks FC**	**2**
W7	Oakland Roots SC	0

Conference Finals; November 16
**E5**	**Rhode Island FC**	**2**
E2	Charleston Battery	1
W4	Las Vegas Lights FC	0
**W2**	**Colorado Springs Switchbacks FC**	**1**

USL Championship Final; November 23
E5	Rhode Island FC	0
**W2**	**Colorado Springs Switchbacks FC**	**3**

====== USL Championship Final ======
November 23, 2024
10:00 AM (MST)

Colorado Springs Switchbacks	3–0	Rhode Island FC
Mahoney (yellow card) 14'; Tejada 22'; Henríquez 42'; Damus 53'	Report

Weidner Field, Colorado Springs, Colorado
Attendance: 8,023
Referee: Ricardo Fierro

Championship Game MVP: Juan Tejada (COS)

===== USL League One =====
====== League table ======
Pos	Team	Pld	W	L	T	GF	GA	GD	Pts	Qualification
1	(Nebraska) Union Omaha (C, S)	22	15	4	3	47	24	+23	48	Playoffs
2	Northern Colorado Hailstorm FC	22	12	5	5	34	18	+16	41	Playoffs
3	(Wisconsin) Forward Madison FC	22	10	3	9	35	18	+17	39	Playoffs
4	(South Carolina) Greenville Triumph SC	22	11	7	4	39	28	+11	37	Playoffs
5	(Tennessee) One Knoxville SC	22	9	5	8	23	16	+7	35	Playoffs
6	(North Carolina) Charlotte Independence	22	9	6	7	37	31	+6	34	Playoffs
7	(Washington (state)) Spokane Velocity FC	22	7	9	6	26	35	−9	27	Playoffs
8	(Virginia) Richmond Kickers	22	6	10	6	25	34	−9	24	Playoffs
9	(Kentucky) Lexington SC	22	5	11	6	33	42	−9	21	
10	(Georgia (U.S. state)) South Georgia Tormenta FC	22	4	10	8	33	42	−9	20	
11	(Tennessee) Chattanooga Red Wolves SC	22	5	14	3	28	48	−20	18	
12	(California) Central Valley Fuego FC	22	5	14	3	27	51	−24	18	

Source: USL League One
Rules for classification: 1) points; 2) total wins; 3) total goal differential; 4) total goals scored; 5) points earned against top four Conference finishers; 6) disciplinary points; 7) drawing of lots.
(C) Champions; (S) Players' Shield winner

Bracket

**Quarterfinals**; November 2–3
1	**Union Omaha**	**1**
8	Richmond Kickers	0
4	**Greenville Triumph SC**	2
5	One Knoxville SC	1
2	Northern Colorado Hailstorm FC	0
7	**Spokane Velocity FC**	**3**
3	**Forward Madison FC**	2
6	Charlotte Independence	0

**Semifinals**; November 9
1	**Union Omaha**	**2**
4	Greenville Triumph SC	1
7	**Spokane Velocity FC (p)**	**0 (5)**
3	Forward Madison FC	0 (4)

**Final**; November 17
1	**Union Omaha**	**3**
7	Spokane Velocity FC	0

====== USL League One Final ======
November 17, 2024
2:00 PM CST

Union Omaha	3–0	Spokane Velocity FC
Schneider 3'; Dolabella 19'; Kunga 71'	Report	Akale (yellow card) 7'; Miller (yellow card) 45'; Peláez (yellow card) 88'

Werner Park, Papillion, Nebraska
Attendance: 5,849
Referee: Adam Kilpatrick

Championship Game MVP: Joe Gallardo (OMA)

===== MLS Next Pro =====
====== Eastern Conference ======
Pos	Div	Team	Pld	W	SOW	SOL	L	GF	GA	GD	Pts	Qualification
1	NE	FC Cincinnati 2	28	16	2	2	8	47	34	+13	54	Qualification for the Playoffs
2	NE	Philadelphia Union II	28	15	3	1	9	59	41	+18	52	Qualification for the Playoffs
3	SE	Inter Miami CF II	28	14	0	6	8	53	45	+8	48	Qualification for the Playoffs
4	NE	Chicago Fire FC II	28	11	5	4	8	51	51	0	47	Qualification for the Playoffs
5	SE	Orlando City B	28	11	4	5	8	53	42	+11	46	Qualification for the Playoffs
6	NE	New York City FC II	28	11	3	6	8	58	46	+12	45	Qualification for the Playoffs
7	NE	Columbus Crew 2	28	11	4	4	9	53	47	+6	45	Qualification for the Playoffs
8	SE	Crown Legacy FC	28	11	5	2	10	51	46	+5	45	Qualification for the Playoffs
9	SE	Chattanooga FC	28	9	8	2	9	45	42	+3	45	
10	SE	Carolina Core FC	28	12	3	1	12	39	45	−6	43	
11	NE	New York Red Bulls II	28	10	4	2	12	56	61	−5	40	
12	NE	Toronto FC II	28	10	1	5	12	44	51	−7	37	
13	SE	Atlanta United 2	28	7	4	3	14	42	64	−22	32	
14	SE	Huntsville City FC	28	8	0	5	15	39	53	−14	29	
15	NE	New England Revolution II	28	4	4	2	18	37	59	−22	22	

Source: MLSNP Eastern Conference
Rules for classification: 1) points; 2) total wins; 3) total goal differential; 4) total goals scored; 5) fewer disciplinary points; 6) away goal differential; 7) away goals scored; 8) home goals differential; 9) home goals scored; 10) coin toss (2 clubs tied) or drawing of lots (≥3 clubs tied)

====== Western Conference ======
Pos	Div	Team	Pld	W	SOW	SOL	L	GF	GA	GD	Pts	Qualification
1	FR	North Texas SC	28	16	6	2	4	56	32	+24	62	Qualification for the Playoffs
2	FR	St. Louis City 2	28	17	1	3	7	53	35	+18	56	Qualification for the Playoffs
3	PC	The Town FC	28	13	4	4	7	41	28	+13	51	Qualification for the Playoffs
4	PC	Tacoma Defiance	28	13	2	3	10	59	53	+6	46	Qualification for the Playoffs
5	PC	Los Angeles FC 2	28	12	3	3	10	51	54	−3	45	Qualification for the Playoffs
6	PC	Ventura County FC	28	8	8	3	9	49	49	0	43	Qualification for the Playoffs
7	PC	Whitecaps FC 2	28	10	3	4	11	45	44	+1	40	Qualification for the Playoffs
8	FR	Houston Dynamo 2	28	10	2	5	11	46	45	+1	39	Qualification for the Playoffs
9	PC	Real Monarchs	28	9	5	2	12	39	41	−2	39	
10	FR	Sporting Kansas City II	28	10	2	4	12	53	57	−4	38	
11	PC	Portland Timbers 2	28	8	4	6	10	43	45	−2	38	
12	FR	Austin FC II	28	7	4	7	10	44	49	−5	36	
13	FR	Minnesota United FC 2	28	8	4	0	16	43	73	−30	32	
14	FR	Colorado Rapids 2	28	6	1	3	18	37	54	−17	23	

Source: MLSNP Western Conference
Rules for classification: 1) points; 2) total wins; 3) total goal differential; 4) total goals scored; 5) fewer disciplinary points; 6) away goal differential; 7) away goals scored; 8) home goals differential; 9) home goals scored; 10) coin toss (2 clubs tied) or drawing of lots (≥3 clubs tied)

====== Overall table ======
Pos	Team	Pld	W	SOW	SOL	L	GF	GA	GD	Pts	Awards
1	North Texas SC	28	16	6	2	4	56	32	+24	62	Regular season champion
2	St. Louis City 2	28	17	1	3	7	53	35	+18	56	
3	FC Cincinnati 2	28	16	2	2	8	47	34	+13	54	
4	Philadelphia Union II	28	15	3	1	9	59	41	+18	52	
5	The Town FC	28	13	4	4	7	41	28	+13	51	
6	Inter Miami CF II	28	14	0	6	8	53	45	+8	48	
7	Chicago Fire FC II	28	11	5	4	8	51	51	0	47	
8	Tacoma Defiance	28	13	2	3	10	59	53	+6	46	
9	Orlando City B	28	11	4	5	8	53	42	+11	46	
10	Los Angeles FC 2	28	12	3	3	10	51	54	−3	45	
11	New York City FC II	28	11	3	6	8	58	46	+12	45	
12	Columbus Crew 2	28	11	4	4	9	53	47	+6	45	
13	Crown Legacy FC	28	11	5	2	10	51	46	+5	45	
14	Chattanooga FC	28	9	8	2	9	45	42	+3	45	
15	Carolina Core FC	28	12	3	1	12	39	45	−6	43	
16	Ventura County FC	28	8	8	3	9	49	49	0	43	
17	Whitecaps FC 2	28	10	3	4	11	45	44	+1	40	
18	New York Red Bulls II	28	10	4	2	12	56	61	−5	40	
19	Houston Dynamo 2	28	10	2	5	11	46	45	+1	39	
20	Real Monarchs	28	9	5	2	12	39	41	−2	39	
21	Sporting Kansas City II	28	10	2	4	12	53	57	−4	38	
22	Portland Timbers 2	28	8	4	6	10	43	45	−2	38	
23	Toronto FC II	28	10	1	5	12	44	51	−7	37	
24	Austin FC II	28	7	4	7	10	44	49	−5	36	
25	Minnesota United FC 2	28	8	4	0	16	43	73	−30	32	
26	Atlanta United 2	28	7	4	3	14	42	64	−22	32	
27	Huntsville City FC	28	8	0	5	15	39	53	−14	29	
28	Colorado Rapids 2	28	6	1	3	18	37	54	−17	23	
29	New England Revolution II	28	4	4	2	18	37	59	−22	22	

Source: MLSNP
Rules for classification: 1) points; 2) total wins; 3) total goal differential; 4) total goals scored; 5) fewer disciplinary points; 6) away goal differential; 7) away goals scored; 8) home goals differential; 9) home goals scored; 10) coin toss (2 clubs tied) or drawing of lots (≥3 clubs tied)

====== MLS Next Pro Playoffs ======
Bracket

Conference Quarterfinals; October 20	Conference Semifinals; October 26–27
E3	Inter Miami CF II	2
**E7**	**Columbus Crew 2**	**6**
**E7**	**Columbus Crew 2**	**3**
E4	Chicago Fire FC II	2
**E4**	**Chicago Fire FC II (p)**	**1 (5)**
E5	Orlando City B	1 (4)
**Eastern Conference**
E1	FC Cincinnati 2	1
**E8**	**Crown Legacy FC**	**2**
E8	Crown Legacy FC	1 (3)
**E2**	**Philadelphia Union II (p)**	**1 (4)**
**E2**	**Philadelphia Union II**	**1**
E6	New York City FC II	0
**W1**	**North Texas SC**	**3**
W7	Vancouver Whitecaps 2	2
**W1**	**North Texas SC**	**4**
W4	Tacoma Defiance	1
**W4**	**Tacoma Defiance**	**4**
W6	Ventura County FC	0
**Western Conference**
**W3**	**The Town FC**	**2**
W8	Houston Dynamo 2	1
W3	The Town FC	2
**W2**	**St. Louis City 2 (a.e.t.)**	**4**
**W2**	**St. Louis City 2**	**2**
W5	Los Angeles FC 2	1

Conference Finals; November 2
E7	Columbus Crew 2	0
**E2**	**Philadelphia Union II**	**4**
**W1**	**North Texas SC (a.e.t.)**	**3**
W2	St. Louis City 2	0

MLS Next Pro Final; November 9
E2	Philadelphia Union II	2
**W1**	**North Texas SC**	**3**

====== 2024 MLS Next Pro Cup Final ======
November 9
8:30 PM EDT

North Texas SC	3–2	Philadelphia Union II
Farrington 51'; Pedrinho (yellow card) 52' (goal) 90+1'; Endeley (yellow card) 56'; Sali (yellow card) 59' (goal) 67'	Report	Anderson 9'; Davis 18'; Westfield (yellow card) 47'; Makhanya (red card) 75'

Toyota Stadium, Frisco, Texas
Attendance: 7,692
Referee: Joshua Encarnacion

Most Valuable Player: Herbert Endeley (North Texas SC)

==== National Independent Soccer Association ====
Pos	Team	Pld	W	D	L	GF	GA	GD	Pts	Qualification
1	Maryland Bobcats	19	16	2	1	50	18	+32	**50**	Disqualified
2	Michigan Stars (Q)	20	11	3	6	38	25	+13	**36**	Semifinals
3	Club de Lyon	19	5	4	10	30	42	−12	**19**	
4	Savannah Clovers	20	5	3	12	24	42	−18	**18**	
5	Georgia FC	20	5	2	13	24	39	−15	**14**	

Source: NISAofficial.com
Rules for classification: 1) points per game; 2) goal differential; 3) goals for; 4) head-to-head; 5) goals against
(Q) Qualified for the phase indicated

Pos	Team	Pld	W	D	L	GF	GA	GD	Pts	Qualification
1	Los Angeles Force (Q)	18	14	2	2	40	12	+28	**44**	Finals
2	Irvine Zeta (Q)	18	11	4	3	33	12	+21	**37**	Semifinals
3	Capo FC	16	4	3	9	18	29	−11	**15**	
4	Arizona Monsoon	16	0	1	15	7	45	−38	**1**	

Source: NISAofficial.com
Rules for classification: 1) points per game; 2) goal differential; 3) goals for; 4) head-to-head; 5) goals against
(Q) Qualified for the phase indicated

===== National Independent Soccer Association Playoffs =====
Bracket

Semifinal; October 12			Final; October 19
**2**	**Irvine Zeta**	**3**
3	Michigan Stars	0
3	Michigan Stars	0	**1**	**Los Angeles Force (p)**	**1 (3)**
			2	Irvine Zeta	1 (2)

===== NISA Championship =====
October 19
7:00 pm PDT

Los Angeles Force	1–1 (a.e.t.)	Irvine Zeta
Cartagena 26'; Lomeli (yellow card) 98'	Report	Almeida (yellow card) 46' (goal) 55'; Hanson (yellow card) 66'; Culwell (yellow card) 118'
Penalties
Hogbin (penalty scored); Cartagena (penalty scored); Lomeli (penalty missed); Pineda (penalty scored)	3–2	(penalty missed) Kleszewski; (penalty missed) Alvarado; (penalty scored) Salceda; (penalty scored) Mansaray; (penalty missed) Kadono

Veterans Memorial Stadium, Long Beach, California
Attendance: 1,447

==== Cup competitions ====
===== US Open Cup =====
====== Final ======
September 25, 2024
7:30 pm PDT

Los Angeles FC (California)	3–1 (a.e.t.)	Sporting Kansas City
Giroud 53'; Campos 102'; Kamara 109'	Reports: USSF; MLS	Thommy 60'

BMO Stadium, Los Angeles, California
Attendance: 22,214
Referee: Armando Villarreal

==== International competitions ====
===== CONCACAF competitions =====
====== CONCACAF Champions Cup ======
Club	Competition	Final round
Inter Miami CF	2024 CONCACAF Champions Cup	Quarter-finals
Columbus Crew	2024 CONCACAF Champions Cup	Runners Up
Nashville SC	2024 CONCACAF Champions Cup	Round of 16
Philadelphia Union	2024 CONCACAF Champions Cup	Round of 16
FC Cincinnati	2024 CONCACAF Champions Cup	Round of 16
St. Louis City SC	2024 CONCACAF Champions Cup	Round One
Orlando City SC	2024 CONCACAF Champions Cup	Round of 16
New England Revolution	2024 CONCACAF Champions Cup	Quarter-finals
Houston Dynamo FC	2024 CONCACAF Champions Cup	Round of 16

teams in bold are still active in the competition

Round One

Team 1	Agg.	Team 2	1st leg	2nd leg
Saprissa (Costa Rica)	5–6	(United States) Philadelphia Union	2–3	3–3 (a.e.t.)
Independiente (Panama)	0–4	(United States) New England Revolution	0–1	0–3
St. Louis City SC (United States)	2–2 (a)	(United States) Houston Dynamo FC	2–1	1–0
Cavalry FC (Canada)	1–6	(United States) Orlando City SC	0–3	1–3
Cavalier (Jamaica)	0–6	(United States) FC Cincinnati	0–2	0–4
Moca (Dominican Republic)	0–7	(United States) Nashville SC	0–3	0–4

Round of 16

Team 1	Agg.	Team 2	1st leg	2nd leg
Philadelphia Union (United States)	0–6	(Mexico) Pachuca	0–0	0–6
New England Revolution (United States)	5–1	(Costa Rica) Alajuelense	4–0	1–1
Houston Dynamo FC (United States)	1–2	(United States) Columbus Crew	0–1	1–1
Orlando City SC (United States)	2–4	(Mexico) UANL	0–0	2–4
FC Cincinnati (United States)	1–3	(Mexico) Monterrey	0–1	1–2
Nashville SC (United States)	3–5	(United States) Inter Miami CF	2–2	1–3

Quarter-finals

Team 1	Agg.	Team 2	1st leg	2nd leg
New England Revolution (United States)	2–9 (Note: Due to the availability of their stadium, New England Revolution requested to play the first leg at home, followed by the second leg away. This switch request was accepted by CONCACAF and América.)	(Mexico) América	0–4	2–5
Columbus Crew (United States)	1–1 (4–3 p)	(Mexico) UANL	1–1	1–1
Inter Miami CF (United States)	2–5	(Mexico) Monterrey	1–2	1–3

Notes

Semi-finals

Team 1	Agg.	Team 2	1st leg	2nd leg
Columbus Crew (United States)	5–2	(Mexico) Monterrey	2–1	3–1

Final

1 June 2024 (Note: The final match (originally scheduled for 2 June 2024) was moved back to 1 June 2024 due to a Mexican team hosting the final due to the 2024 Mexican general election taking place that day.)
21:15 (19:15 UTC−6)

Pachuca (Mexican Football Federation)	3–0	(United States Soccer Federation) Columbus Crew
Rondón 12', 67'; E. Rodríguez 32'	Report

Estadio Hidalgo, Pachuca
Referee: Iván Barton (El Salvador)

====== Leagues Cup ======
Group Stage

East

East 1
East 2
East 3

Pos	Team	Pld	Pts
1	(United States Soccer Federation) FC Cincinnati	2	**6**
2	(United States Soccer Federation) New York City FC	2	**2**
3	(Mexican Football Federation) Querétaro	2	**1**

Source: Leagues Cup

Pos	Team	Pld	Pts
1	(United States Soccer Federation) Orlando City SC	2	**5**
2	(Canadian Soccer Association) CF Montréal	2	**3**
3	(Mexican Football Federation) Atlético San Luis	2	**1**

Source: Leagues Cup

Pos	Team	Pld	Pts
1	(Mexican Football Federation) UANL	2	**6**
2	(United States Soccer Federation) Inter Miami CF	2	**3**
3	(Mexican Football Federation) Puebla	2	**0**

Source: Leagues Cup
East 4
East 5
East 6

Pos	Team	Pld	Pts
1	(United States Soccer Federation) Philadelphia Union	2	**4**
2	(Mexican Football Federation) Cruz Azul	2	**3**
3	(United States Soccer Federation) Charlotte FC	2	**2**

Source: Leagues Cup

Pos	Team	Pld	Pts
1	(United States Soccer Federation) New England Revolution	2	**5**
2	(Mexican Football Federation) Mazatlán	2	**3**
3	(United States Soccer Federation) Nashville SC	2	**1**

Source: Leagues Cup

Pos	Team	Pld	Pts
1	(Canadian Soccer Association) Toronto FC	2	**5**
2	(Mexican Football Federation) Pachuca	2	**2**
3	(United States Soccer Federation) New York Red Bulls	2	**2**

Source: Leagues Cup
East 7

Pos	Team	Pld	Pts
1	(United States Soccer Federation) D.C. United	2	**5**
2	(Mexican Football Federation) Santos Laguna	2	**2**
3	(United States Soccer Federation) Atlanta United FC	2	**2**

Source: Leagues Cup

West

West 1
West 2
West 3

Pos	Team	Pld	Pts
1	(United States Soccer Federation) Austin FC	2	**6**
2	(Mexican Football Federation) UNAM	2	**2**
3	(Mexican Football Federation) Monterrey	2	**1**

Source: Leagues Cup

Pos	Team	Pld	Pts
1	(United States Soccer Federation) LA Galaxy	2	**5**
2	(United States Soccer Federation) San Jose Earthquakes	2	**2**
3	(Mexican Football Federation) Guadalajara	2	**2**

Source: Leagues Cup

Pos	Team	Pld	Pts
1	(Mexican Football Federation) Juárez	2	**5**
2	(United States Soccer Federation) St. Louis City SC	2	**4**
3	(United States Soccer Federation) FC Dallas	2	**0**

Source: Leagues Cup
West 4
West 5
West 6

Pos	Team	Pld	Pts
1	(Mexican Football Federation) Toluca	2	**6**
2	(United States Soccer Federation) Sporting Kansas City	2	**3**
3	(United States Soccer Federation) Chicago Fire FC	2	**0**

Source: Leagues Cup

Pos	Team	Pld	Pts
1	(United States Soccer Federation) Portland Timbers	2	**6**
2	(United States Soccer Federation) Colorado Rapids	2	**2**
3	(Mexican Football Federation) León	2	**1**

Source: Leagues Cup

Pos	Team	Pld	Pts
1	(Mexican Football Federation) Necaxa	2	**3**
2	(United States Soccer Federation) Seattle Sounders FC	2	**3**
3	(United States Soccer Federation) Minnesota United FC	2	**3**

Source: Leagues Cup
West 7
West 8

Pos	Team	Pld	Pts
1	(Canadian Soccer Association) Vancouver Whitecaps FC	2	**5**
2	(United States Soccer Federation) Los Angeles FC	2	**4**
3	(Mexican Football Federation) Tijuana	2	**0**

Source: Leagues Cup

Pos	Team	Pld	Pts
1	(United States Soccer Federation) Houston Dynamo FC	2	**3**
2	(Mexican Football Federation) Atlas	2	**3**
3	(United States Soccer Federation) Real Salt Lake	2	**3**

Source: Leagues Cup

Knockout stage

Round of 32

Team 1	Score	Team 2
Los Angeles FC (United States)	2–0	(United States) Austin FC
Inter Miami CF (United States)	4–3	(Canada) Toronto FC
Seattle Sounders FC (United States)	3–1	(United States) LA Galaxy
San Jose Earthquakes (United States)	5–0	(Mexico) Necaxa
FC Cincinnati (United States)	1–1 (6–5 p)	(Mexico) Santos Laguna
Columbus Crew (United States)	4–0	(United States) Sporting Kansas City
D.C. United (United States)	1–2	(Mexico) Mazatlán
New England Revolution (United States)	1–1 (6–7 p)	(United States) New York City FC
Orlando City SC (United States)	0–0 (4–5 p)	(Mexico) Cruz Azul
Philadelphia Union (United States)	2–0	(Canada) CF Montréal
St. Louis City SC (United States)	3–1	(United States) Portland Timbers
Toluca (Mexico)	2–2 (5–4 p)	(United States) Houston Dynamo FC
Juárez (Mexico)	2–3	(United States) Colorado Rapids

Round of 16

Team 1	Score	Team 2
Seattle Sounders FC (United States)	4–0	(Mexico) UNAM
Columbus Crew (United States)	3–2	(United States) Inter Miami CF
FC Cincinnati (United States)	2–4	(United States) Philadelphia Union
UANL (Mexico)	1–2	(United States) New York City FC
Toluca (Mexico)	1–2	(United States) Colorado Rapids
América (Mexico)	4–2	(United States) St. Louis City SC
Los Angeles FC (United States)	4–1	(United States) San Jose Earthquakes

Quarter-finals

Team 1	Score	Team 2
Columbus Crew (United States)	1–1 (4–3 p)	(United States) New York City FC
Philadelphia Union (United States)	1–1 (4–3 p)	(Mexico) Mazatlán
Seattle Sounders FC (United States)	0–3	(United States) Los Angeles FC
América (Mexico)	0–0 (8–9 p)	(United States) Colorado Rapids

Semi-finals

Team 1	Score	Team 2
Columbus Crew (United States)	3–1	(United States) Philadelphia Union
Los Angeles FC (United States)	4–0	(United States) Colorado Rapids

Third Place

Team 1	Score	Team 2
Philadelphia Union (United States)	2–2 (1–3 p)	(United States) Colorado Rapids

Final

August 25, 2024
7:15 p.m. EDT

Columbus Crew (United States Soccer Federation)	3–1	(United States Soccer Federation) Los Angeles FC
Hernández 45', 90+2'; Russell-Rowe 90+4'	Report	Giroud 57'

Lower.com Field, Columbus, Ohio
Attendance: 20,190
Referee: Oshane Nation (Jamaica)

====== Campeones Cup ======
September 25, 2024
7:30 p.m. EDT (UTC−4)

Columbus Crew (United States Soccer Federation)	1–1	(Mexican Football Federation) América
Amundsen 77'	Report	Dávila 68'
Penalties
Camacho (penalty scored); Mățan (penalty missed); Russell-Rowe (penalty scored); Hernández (penalty scored); Jones (penalty scored); Jackson (penalty missed); Amundsen (penalty missed)	4–5	(penalty scored) Valdés; (penalty missed) R. Sánchez; (penalty scored) Aguirre; (penalty scored) Fidalgo; (penalty scored) Dávila; (penalty missed) Juárez; (penalty scored) Araujo

Lower.com Field, Columbus, Ohio
Attendance: 20,198
Referee: Walter López (Guatemala)

=== Women's ===
==== League competitions ====
===== National Women's Soccer League =====
====== Regular season ======
Pos	Team	Pld	W	D	L	GF	GA	GD	Pts	Qualification
1	Orlando Pride (C, S)	26	18	6	2	46	20	+26	60	NWSL Shield, playoffs, and CONCACAF W Champions Cup
2	Washington Spirit	26	18	2	6	51	28	+23	56	Playoffs, and CONCACAF W Champions Cup
3	NJ/NY Gotham FC	26	17	5	4	41	20	+21	56	Playoffs, and CONCACAF W Champions Cup (Note: With Orlando Pride winning both the 2024 National Women's Soccer League Championship and 2024 National Women's Soccer League Shield, the third qualifying spot for the United States went to the next best club in 2024 National Women's Soccer League Shield standings not already qualified, Gotham FC.)
4	Kansas City Current	26	16	7	3	57	31	+26	55	Playoffs
5	North Carolina Courage	26	12	3	11	34	28	+6	39	Playoffs
6	Portland Thorns FC	26	10	4	12	37	35	+2	34	Playoffs
7	Bay FC	26	11	1	14	31	41	−10	34	Playoffs
8	Chicago Red Stars	26	10	2	14	31	38	−7	32	Playoffs
9	Racing Louisville FC	26	7	7	12	33	39	−6	28	
10	San Diego Wave FC	26	6	7	13	24	35	−11	25	
11	Utah Royals	26	7	4	15	22	40	−18	25	
12	Angel City FC	26	7	6	13	29	42	−13	24 (Note: Angel City FC were deducted three points for breaching spending cap rules.)	
13	Seattle Reign FC	26	6	5	15	27	44	−17	23	
14	Houston Dash	26	5	5	16	20	42	−22	20	

Source: NWSL
Rules for classification: Tiebreakers
(C) Champions and W Champions Cup; (S) NWSL Shield

====== Playoffs ======
Bracket

**Quarterfinals**
**1**	**Orlando Pride**	**4**
8	Chicago Red Stars	1
**4**	**Kansas City Current**	**1**
5	North Carolina Courage	0
**2**	**Washington Spirit**	**2**
7	Bay FC	1
**3**	**NJ/NY Gotham FC**	**2**
6	Portland Thorns FC	1

**Semifinals**
**1**	**Orlando Pride**	**3**
4	Kansas City Current	2
**2**	**Washington Spirit (p)**	**1 (3)**
3	NJ/NY Gotham FC	1 (0)

**Championship**
**1**	**Orlando Pride**	**1**
2	Washington Spirit	0

Championship

November 23, 2024
8:00 pm EST

Orlando Pride	1–0	Washington Spirit
Banda 37'	Report

CPKC Stadium, Kansas City, Missouri
Attendance: 11,500
Referee: Alyssa Nichols

===== USL Super League =====
====== Regular season ======
Pos	Team	Pld	W	L	T	GF	GA	GD	Pts	Qualification
1	Carolina Ascent (S)	28	13	6	9	45	24	+21	48	Playoffs
2	Tampa Bay Sun (C)	28	12	6	10	42	28	+14	46	Playoffs
3	Dallas Trinity	28	12	9	7	42	30	+12	43	Playoffs
4	Fort Lauderdale United	28	11	8	9	35	33	+2	42 (Note: Head-to-head points: Fort Lauderdale 6, Spokane 3)	Playoffs
5	Spokane Zephyr	28	11	8	9	37	32	+5	42	
6	Brooklyn	28	10	9	9	30	34	−4	39	
7	DC Power	28	5	14	9	24	41	−17	24	
8	Lexington	28	4	18	6	29	62	−33	18	

Source: USL Super League
Rules for classification: 1) head-to-head points; 2) total goal differential; 3) total goals scored; 4) disciplinary points; 5) drawing of lots.
(C) Champions; (S) Players' Shield winner

==== Cup competitions ====
===== NWSL Challenge Cup =====
March 15, 2024
8:00 pm EDT

NJ/NY Gotham FC	0–1	San Diego Wave FC
	Report	Morgan 88'

Red Bull Arena, Harrison, New Jersey
Attendance: 14,241
Referee: Danielle Chesky

==== International competitions ====
===== CONCACAF competitions =====
====== 2024–25 CONCACAF W Champions Cup ======
Group Stage

Group A

Pos	Team	Pld	W	D	L	GF	GA	GD	Pts	Qualification	TUA	NYJ	MON	LDA	FRA
1	(Mexico) Tigres UANL	4	3	1	0	18	6	+12	**10**	Advance to knockout stage	—	—	4–0	3–1	—
2	(United States) NJ/NY Gotham	4	2	2	0	21	4	+17	**8**	Advance to knockout stage	4–4	—	0–0	—	—
3	(Mexico) Monterrey	4	2	1	1	8	4	+4	**7**		—	—	—	3–0	5–0
4	(Costa Rica) Alajuelense	4	1	0	3	6	10	−4	**3**		—	0–4	—	—	5–0
5	(Jamaica) Frazsiers Whip	4	0	0	4	1	30	−29	**0**		1–7	0–13	—	—	—

Source: CONCACAF
Rules for classification: Tiebreakers

Group B

Pos	Team	Pld	W	D	L	GF	GA	GD	Pts	Qualification	AME	POR	SDW	WFC	SFE
1	(Mexico) América	4	3	0	1	14	3	+11	**9**	Advance to knockout stage	—	—	—	7–0	5–0
2	(United States) Portland Thorns	4	3	0	1	13	5	+8	**9**	Advance to knockout stage	3–1	—	—	—	2–1
3	(United States) San Diego Wave	4	3	0	1	7	3	+4	**9**		0–1	3–2	—	—	—
4	(Canada) Whitecaps Girls Elite	4	1	0	3	2	16	−14	**3**		—	0–6	0–2	—	—
5	(Panama) Santa Fe	4	0	0	4	2	11	−9	**0**		—	—	0–2	1–2	—

Source: CONCACAF
Rules for classification: Tiebreakers

===== NWSL x Liga MX Femenil Summer Cup =====
====== Group Stage ======
Group A
Group B
Broup C

Pos	Team	Pld	Pts
1	(United States Soccer Federation) Utah Royals	3	**6**
2	(United States Soccer Federation) Portland Thorns FC	3	**6**
3	(United States Soccer Federation) Seattle Reign FC	3	**3**
4	(Mexican Football Federation) Tijuana	3	**3**

Source: NWSL

Pos	Team	Pld	Pts
1	(United States Soccer Federation) Angel City FC	3	**8**
2	(United States Soccer Federation) San Diego Wave FC	3	**4**
3	(Mexican Football Federation) Club América	3	**3**
4	(United States Soccer Federation) Bay FC	3	**3**

Source: NWSL

Pos	Team	Pld	Pts
1	(United States Soccer Federation) Kansas City Current	3	**9**
2	(United States Soccer Federation) Houston Dash	3	**6**
3	(Mexican Football Federation) Tigres UANL	3	**3**
4	(Mexican Football Federation) Pachuca	3	**0**

Source: NWSL
Group D
Group E
Ranking of group winners

Pos	Team	Pld	Pts
1	(United States Soccer Federation) NJ/NY Gotham FC	3	**8**
2	(United States Soccer Federation) Chicago Red Stars	3	**4**
3	(United States Soccer Federation) Washington Spirit	3	**3**
4	(Mexican Football Federation) Guadalajara	3	**3**

Source: NWSL

Pos	Team	Pld	Pts
1	(United States Soccer Federation) North Carolina Courage	3	**7**
2	(United States Soccer Federation) Racing Louisville FC	3	**6**
3	(United States Soccer Federation) Orlando Pride	3	**4**
4	(Mexican Football Federation) Monterrey	3	**1**

Source: NWSL

Pos	Team	Pld	Pts
1	(United States Soccer Federation) Kansas City Current	3	**9**
2	(United States Soccer Federation) NJ/NY Gotham FC	3	**8**
3	(United States Soccer Federation) Angel City FC	3	**8**
4	(United States Soccer Federation) North Carolina Courage	3	**7**
5	(United States Soccer Federation) Utah Royals	3	**6**

Source: NWSL

====== Knockout stage ======
Bracket

The tournament bracket is shown below, with bold denoting the winners of each match.

Semifinals
August 6 – Kansas City
**(United States Soccer Federation) NJ/NY Gotham FC**	**1**
(United States Soccer Federation) Angel City FC	0
August 6 – Kansas City
**(United States Soccer Federation) Kansas City Current**	**2**
(United States Soccer Federation) North Carolina Courage	0

Final
October 25 – San Antonio
(United States Soccer Federation) NJ/NY Gotham FC	0
**(United States Soccer Federation) Kansas City Current**	**2**

Semifinals

August 6
17:00 ET

NJ/NY Gotham FC (United States Soccer Federation)	1–0	(United States Soccer Federation) Angel City FC
Sheehan 48'	Report

CPKC Stadium, Kansas City, Missouri
Referee: Elijio Arreguin

August 6
21:00 ET

Kansas City Current (United States Soccer Federation)	2–0	(United States Soccer Federation) North Carolina Courage
Chawinga 2'; Debinha 78'	Report

CPKC Stadium, Kansas City, Missouri
Referee: Katja Koroleva

Final

October 25
19:30 ET

NJ/NY Gotham FC (United States Soccer Federation)	0–2	(United States Soccer Federation) Kansas City Current
	Report

Toyota Field, San Antonio, Texas

== Honors ==
=== Professional ===
Men
Competition		Winner
U.S. Open Cup		Los Angeles FC
MLS Supporters' Shield		Inter Miami CF
MLS Cup		LA Galaxy
Leagues Cup		Columbus Crew
USL Championship	Players' Shield	Louisville City FC
USL Championship	Playoffs	Colorado Springs Switchbacks FC
MLS Next Pro	Regular season	North Texas SC
MLS Next Pro	Playoffs	North Texas SC
USL League One	Players' Shield	Union Omaha
USL League One	Playoffs	Union Omaha
USL Jägermeister Cup		Northern Colorado Hailstorm FC
NISA	Regular season	Maryland Bobcats FC
NISA	Playoffs	Los Angeles Force

Women
Competition	Winner
NWSL Challenge Cup	San Diego Wave FC
National Women's Soccer League	Orlando Pride
NWSL Shield	Orlando Pride

=== Amateur ===
Men
Competition	Team
USL League Two	Seacoast United Phantoms
National Premier Soccer League	El Farolito SC
National Amateur Cup	New York Pancyprian-Freedoms
NCAA Division I Soccer Championship	University of Vermont
NCAA Division II Soccer Championship	Lynn University
NCAA Division III Soccer Championship	Amherst College
NAIA Soccer Championship	Dalton State College (GA)

Women
Competition	Team
United Women's Soccer	Santa Clarita Blue Heat
USL W League	North Carolina Courage U23
Women's Premier Soccer League	California Storm
NCAA Division I Soccer Championship	University of North Carolina
NCAA Division II Soccer Championship	Cal Poly Pomona
NCAA Division III Soccer Championship	Washington University
NAIA Soccer Championship	SCAD Bees (GA)
