= 2024 National Independent Soccer Association season =

National Independent Soccer Association
- Season: 2024
- Dates: Apr. 6 – Sep. 29 (regular season); Oct. 4–27 (playoffs)
- Champions: Los Angeles Force
- Matches: 84
- Goals: 266 (3.17 per match)
- Top goalscorer: (Nigeria) Patrick Okonkwo (5 goals)
- Best goalkeeper: (United States) Seth Torman Los Angeles Force
- Biggest home win: 4 games by 4 goals
- Biggest away win: Capo FC 0–5 Los Angeles Force (Sep. 7)
- Highest scoring: Maryland Bobcats 5–3 Club de Lyon (Jul. 17)
- Longest winning run: Maryland Bobcats (11 games)
- Longest unbeaten run: Maryland Bobcats (17 games)
- Longest winless run: Arizona Monsoon (16 games)
- Longest losing run: Arizona Monsoon (18 games)
- All statistics correct as of October 19, 2024.

The 2024 NISA season is the sixth season of the National Independent Soccer Association's third-division soccer competition. The 2023 champions, Flower City Union, are not defending their title, after announcing their departure from the league during the off-season.

== Teams ==
Of the nine teams that played in the 2023 season, five return for 2024, two (Flower City Union and Chattanooga FC) are moving on to different leagues, and two, Albion San Diego and Gold Star FC, are on hiatus, with the aim to return in 2025.

The five teams are joined by four expansion clubs: Arizona Monsoon, Capo FC, Georgia Lions FC and Irvine Zeta. On April 3, NISA announced that the Georgia Lions FC had been taken over by new leadership and were being rebranded as Georgia FC to start the 2024 season.

=== Stadiums and locations ===
Locations of announced clubs
- West Conference
- East Conference
Southern California clubs
- West Conference

Team	Location	Stadium	Capacity
Arizona Monsoon	Glendale, AZ	Matt O. Hanhila Field	3,000
Capo FC	San Juan Capistrano, CA	JSerra Catholic High School	
Club de Lyon	Daytona Beach, FL	Daytona Stadium	9,601
Georgia FC	Atlanta, GA	Atlanta Silverbacks Park	5,000
Irvine Zeta	Irvine, CA	Championship Soccer Stadium	5,500
Los Angeles Force	Long Beach, CA	Veterans Memorial Stadium	11,600
Maryland Bobcats	Boyds, MD	Maryland SoccerPlex	4,000
Michigan Stars	Washington, MI	Romeo High School	4,000
Savannah Clovers	Savannah, GA	Memorial Stadium	5,000

=== Personnel and sponsorship ===
Note: The league has signed a deal with Hummel to be the official kit manufacturer, but it still allows clubs to find their own provider.

Team	Head coach	Captain(s)	Kit manufacturer	Shirt sponsor
Arizona Monsoon	(Mexico) Carlos Padilla		(United States) Capelli	—
Capo FC	(United States) Peter Carey		(United States) New Balance	DirecTV
Club de Lyon	(Argentina) Hector Almandoz	(Venezuela) Victor Rojas	(Germany) Adidas	—
Georgia FC	(United States) Kerem Daser			
Irvine Zeta	(United States) Tyler Silva	(Japan) Shinya Kadono	(Spain) Kelme	—
Los Angeles Force	(Israel) Dekel Keinan	(United States) Brandon Gomez	(United States) Xara	—
Maryland Bobcats	(France) Alex Kao	(Ivory Coast) Josselin Possian	(Denmark) Hummel	Holiday Inn College Park
Michigan Stars	(Montenegro) Enis Dokovic	(Zimbabwe) Tatenda Mkuruva	(Germany) Adidas	HTC
Savannah Clovers	(England) David Proctor	(United States) Shandon Wright	(England) Umbro	Castro Wood Floors

=== Coaching changes ===
Team	Outgoing coach	Manner of departure	Date of vacancy	Position in table	Incoming coach	Date of appointment
Los Angeles Force	(United States) Matt Morse	Fired	December 8, 2023	Pre-season	(Israel) Dekel Keinan	December 8, 2023
Club de Lyon	(United States) Victor Balaguer			Pre-season	(Argentina) Hector Almandoz	March 4, 2024

== Regular season ==
The teams are divided in two conferences, playing an unbalanced schedule weighted on regional play. The season was scheduled to start on March 23, but was delayed until April 6 because the four expansion teams needed more time to prepare for the season.

=== Standings ===
==== East Conference ====
Pos	Team	Pld	W	D	L	GF	GA	GD	Pts	Qualification
1	Maryland Bobcats	19	16	2	1	50	18	+32	50	Disqualified
2	Michigan Stars (Q)	20	11	3	6	38	25	+13	36	Semifinals
3	Club de Lyon	19	5	4	10	30	42	−12	19	
4	Savannah Clovers	20	5	3	12	24	42	−18	18	
5	Georgia FC	20	5	2	13	24	39	−15	14	

Source: NISAofficial.com
Rules for classification: 1) points per game; 2) goal differential; 3) goals for; 4) head-to-head; 5) goals against
(Q) Qualified for the phase indicated

==== West Conference ====
Pos	Team	Pld	W	D	L	GF	GA	GD	Pts	Qualification
1	Los Angeles Force (Q)	18	14	2	2	40	12	+28	44	Finals
2	Irvine Zeta (Q)	18	11	4	3	33	12	+21	37	Semifinals
3	Capo FC	16	4	3	9	18	29	−11	15	
4	Arizona Monsoon	16	0	1	15	7	45	−38	1	

Source: NISAofficial.com
Rules for classification: 1) points per game; 2) goal differential; 3) goals for; 4) head-to-head; 5) goals against
(Q) Qualified for the phase indicated

=== Results ===
==== East Conference ====
Home \ Away	CDL	GEO	MAR	MIC	SAV	CDL	GEO	MAR	MIC	SAV	CDL	GEO	MAR	MIC	SAV
Club de Lyon	—	2–1	1–4	1–2	0–2	—		Can.	0–3	2–3	—	1–4			1–0
Georgia FC	1–1	—	0–3	4–1	3–0	1–3	—	0–2	0–2	1–3	3–3	—	0–3	1–0	
Maryland Bobcats	5–3	2–1	—	2–2	2–0	2–2	2–1	—	2–0	5–1	3–0		—	3–1	
Michigan Stars	3–2	2–0	2–0	—	3–2	1–3	3–0	1–2	—	3–0	1–3			—	3–0
Savannah Clovers	1–1	2–1	0–3	1–1	—	0–4	0–2	2–3	2–2	—		4–0	1–2		—

Source: nisasoccer.com
Legend: Blue = home team win; Yellow = draw; Red = away team win.

==== West Conference ====
Home \ Away	ARI	CAP	ZET	LAF	ARI	CAP	ZET	LAF	ARI	CAP	ZET	LAF
Arizona Monsoon	—	2–3	0–1	1–3	—	PP	0–3	0–3	—	PP	0–3	0–3
Capo FC	1–1	—	0–2	1–2	2–0	—	0–2	1–2	3–2	—	0–1	0–5
Irvine Zeta	4–0	1–1	—	1–0	3–0	2–2	—	0–1	3–0	3–1	—	0–2
L.A. Force	4–0	0–2	2–2	—	3–0	2–0	1–0	—	3–1	2–1	2–2	—

Source: nisasoccer.com
Legend: Blue = home team win; Yellow = draw; Red = away team win.

== Playoffs ==
In a format change from the previous seasons, the top two clubs in each conference will advance to their respective conference championship the weekend of October 4–6. The regular season head-to-head winner between conference champions will host the NISA championship the weekend of October 25–27. NISA announced that the Maryland Bobcats were ineligible for the playoffs due to noncompliance with league and USSF standards, despite having the best record in the league.

Semifinal; October 12			Final; October 19
2	Irvine Zeta	3
3	Michigan Stars	0
3	Michigan Stars	0	1	Los Angeles Force (p)	1 (3)
			2	Irvine Zeta	1 (2)

October 12 Semifinals	Irvine Zeta	3–0	Michigan Stars	Irvine, California
7:00 pm PDT	Estrada 8'; Almeida (yellow card) 52', (goal) 65'; Ciochetto 61', (yellow card) 90+2'	Report	Maduekwe (yellow card) 24'; Mkuruva (red card) 35'; Wright (yellow card) 85'	Stadium: Championship Soccer Stadium

October 19 Finals	Los Angeles Force	1–1 (a.e.t.) (3–2 p)	Irvine Zeta	Long Beach, California
7:00 pm PDT	Cartagena 26'; Lomeli (yellow card) 98'	Report	Almeida (yellow card) 46' (goal) 55'; Hanson (yellow card) 66'; Culwell (yellow card) 118'	Stadium: Veterans Memorial Stadium; Attendance: 1,447
	Penalties
	Hogbin (penalty scored); Cartagena (penalty scored); Lomeli (penalty missed); Pineda (penalty scored)		(penalty missed) Kleszewski; (penalty missed) Alvarado; (penalty scored) Salceda; (penalty scored) Mansaray; (penalty missed) Kadono

== Player statistics ==
As of June 9, 2024

=== Top goalscorers ===
Rank	Player	Club	Goals
1	(Nigeria) Patrick Okonkwo	Georgia FC	6
2	(Honduras) Darwin Espinal	Maryland Bobcats	5
2	(Croatia) Leon Maric	Michigan Stars	5
4	(Brazil) George Almeida	Irvine Zeta	4
4	(Argentina) Juan Manuel Martínez	Club de Lyon	4
4	(Mexico) Brandon Zambrano	Capo FC	4
7	(France) Niels Lellouch	Michigan Stars	3
7	(United States) Kevin Herrera	Georgia FC	3
7	(Niger) Praise Maduekwe	Michigan Stars	3
7	(United States) Bryan Ortega	Los Angeles Force	3
7	(Belize) Michael Salazar	Los Angeles Force	3
7	(Senegal) Abdou Mbacke Thiam	Maryland Bobcats	3
13	10 players tied		2

=== Top assists ===
Rank	Player	Club	Assists
1	(United States) Edson Alvarado	Irvine Zeta	2
1	(Argentina) Matias Cruz	Club de Lyon	2
1	(United States) Jedidiah McCloud	Savannah Clovers	2
4	13 players tied		1

=== Clean sheets ===
Rank	Player	Club	Clean sheets
1	(United States) Mitch North	Irvine Zeta	4
2	(Zimbabwe) Tatenda Mkuruva	Michigan Stars	3
3	(United States) Jacob Boyle	Maryland Bobcats	2
3	(United States) Seth Torman	Los Angeles Force	2
5	(United States) Elijah Clark	Georgia FC	1
5	(England) Jack Crichton	Savannah Clovers	1
5	(United States) Jordan Martinez	Capo FC	1
5	(Jamaica) Nicholas Nelson	Georgia FC	1

== Awards ==
=== NISA Best XI ===
Goalkeeper	Defenders	Midfielders	Forwards	Ref.
(United States) Seth Torman, Los Angeles Force	(United States) Luis Almeida, Maryland Bobcats FC (United States) Zack Hargreaves, Savannah Clovers FC (United States) Justin Jovel, Los Angeles Force (United States) Kyle Nelson, Savannah Clovers FC	(United States) Edson Alvarado, Irvine Zeta FC (Honduras) Darwin Espinal, Maryland Bobcats FC (United States) Tyler Gabarra, Maryland Bobcats FC (Ivory Coast) Josselin Possian	(Belize) Michael Salazar, (Brazil) George Almeida	

=== End-of-season awards ===
Award	Winner (club)	Ref.
Golden Glove	(United States) Seth Torman, Los Angeles Force	

== See also ==
- National Independent Soccer Association
