= 2022 California United Strikers FC season =

American soccer team season

California United Strikers
2022 season
- Owner: Pete Capriotti; Bronwyn Capriotti
- President: Michael Collins
- Head coach: Willie Diaz
- Stadium: Championship Stadium; Irvine, California
- NISA: 1st
- Playoffs: Semifinals
- Independent Cup: Did not enter
- U.S. Open Cup: Round of 32
- Top goalscorer: League: Omar Nuño (8); All: Omar Nuño (9)
Home colors	Away colors

The 2022 season was the California United Strikers FC's fifth and final season of existence, their third in the third division of American soccer and their third in the National Independent Soccer Association.

== Background ==
The 2020–21 season was split into three phases as the league moved from a winter to summer schedule. During the Fall 2020 season, the Strikers finished second in the Western Conference, and fourth in the overall league table, failing to qualify for the modified playoffs that were reduced due to the COVID-19 pandemic.

During the Spring 2021 segment of the season, the Strikers finished fourth in the table, and missed out on the championship game. In the Fall 2021 season, the Strikers finished second overall in the league.

== Club ==
=== Management ===
Position	Name
Co-Owner	(United States) Bronwyn Capriotti
Co-Owner	(United States) Pete Capriotti
President and General Manager	(United States) Michael Collins
Vice President	(United States) Darren McCartney
Director of Ticket Operations	(United States) Steven Bruner
Social Media Manager	(India) Pronit Dutta
Head coach	(United States) Willie Diaz
Assistant coach	(Mexico) Beto Navarro
Goalkeeping coach	(United States) Ludovic Antunes

=== First team roster ===
As of October 21, 2022

N	Pos.	Nat.	Name	Age	Since	App	Goals	Ends	Previous team	Notes
Goalkeepers
0	GK	(United States)	Steven Barrera	29	2018	27	0	2023	(United States) Ventura County Fusion	Second nationality: Mexico
33	GK	(Haiti)	Jean Gamain Antoine	28	2021	23	0	2023	(United States) Detroit City	
Defenders
2	DF	(United States)	Gonzalo Salguero	29	2019	37	3	2023	(United States) LA Wolves	
3	DF	(United States)	Aydan Bowers	25	2020	46	2	2023	(Denmark) Helsingør	
4	DF	(United States)	Garrett Hogbin	24	2021	24	2	2023	(United States) Chico State Wildcats	
5	DF	(United States)	Xavier Ikaika Fuerte	31	2019	31	0	2023	(United States) LA Wolves	
12	DF	(United States)	Marc Bermudez	24	2022	3	0	2023	(United States) Cal Poly Mustangs	
17	DF	(United States)	Brady Treinen	18	2022	9	0	2023	(United States) Irvine Strikers	
22	DF	(United States)	Kevin Garcia-Lopez	30	2020	24	1	2023	(United States) Las Vegas Lights	
24	DF	(United States)	Joseph Patrick Pérez	25	2022	9	0	2023	(United States) LA Force	Second nationality: Mexico
Midfielders
6	MF	(United States)	Duncan Capriotti	31	2019	38	0	2023	(United States) LA Wolves	
7	MF	(Mexico)	Luis Garcia Sosa	24	2022	11	3	2023	(United States) Stumptown Athletic	
10	MF	(United States)	Gustavo Villalobos	30	2019	19	1	2023	(United States) FC Golden State	
11	MF	(United States)	Shane Kaemerle	18	2022	10	0	2023	(United States) Irvine Strikers	
13	MF	(United States)	Felipe Liborio Jr.	26	2021	19	0	2023	(United States) Albion San Diego	
15	MF	(United States)	Alex Vedamanikam	23	2021	24	2	2023	(Spain) Alicante City	Second nationality: Spain
18	MF	(United States)	Beto Alvarenga	23	2022	14	1	2023	(United States) UC Irvine Anteaters	Second nationality: Mexico
19	MF	(United States)	Bay Kurtz	26	2022	9	0	2023	(United States) Stumptown Athletic	
20	MF	(United States)	Caleb Suh	20	2022	3	0	2023	(United States) LA Galaxy II	
21	MF	(United States)	Francis Jacobs	17	2022	1	0	2023	(United States) Orange County SC	Second nationality: England; On loan from Orange County SC
23	MF	(Japan)	Shinya Kadono	25	2020	44	4	2023	(United States) Loudoun United	
25	MF	(Brazil)	Guilherme Farias	25	2021	19	1	2023	(United States) Mount SAC Mounties	
34	MF	(Japan)	Ryotaro Kawashima	22	2022	12	3	2023	(United States) Irvine Strikers	
Forwards
8	FW	(United States)	Tony Lopez	24	2020	46	9	2023	(Germany) 1. FCA Darmstadt	
9	FW	(Mexico)	Omar Nuño	28	2019	57	28	2023	(United States) FC Arizona	Second nationality: United States
14	FW	(United States)	Andy Contreras	31	2021	16	2	2023	(United States) SoCal SC	
16	FW	(United States)	Christian Thierjung	27	2019	58	18	2023	(United States) FC Tulsa	
29	FW	(United States)	Marcus Lee	16	2022	6	0	2023	(United States) Irvine Strikers	Second nationality: South Korea
30	FW	(United States)	Bryan Medina	23	2021	2	0	2023	(United States) Bloomfield Bears	

== Transfers ==
=== Transfers in ===
Date	No.	Pos.	Player	From	Fee	Source
August 8, 2021	15	AM	(United States) Alex Vedamanikam	(Spain) Alicante City	Free	
October 6, 2021	30	FW	(United States) Bryan Medina	(United States) Bloomfield Bears	Free	
October 15, 2021	14	FW	(United States) Andy Contreras	(United States) SoCal SC	Free	
February 22, 2022	7	CM	(Mexico) Luis García Sosa	(United States) Stumptown Athletic	Free	
March 16, 2022	12	DF	(United States) Marc Bermudez	(United States) Cal Poly Mustangs	Free	
March 16, 2022	18	MF	(United States) Beto Alvarenga	(United States) UC Irvine Anteaters	Free	
March 16, 2022	19	CB	(United States) Bay Kurts	(United States) Stumptown Athletic	Free	
March 16, 2022	20	AM	(United States) Caleb Suh	(United States) LA Galaxy II	Free	
March 22, 2022	29	LW	(United States) Marcus Lee	(United States) Irvine Strikers	Free	

=== Transfers out ===
Date	No.	Pos.	Player	To	Fee	Source
December 1, 2021	3	DF	(United States) Chris Klute	None	Retired	
December 1, 2021	15	DF	(United States) James McGhee	None	Released	
December 1, 2021	18	MF	(South Korea) Min-jae Kwak	None	Released	
December 1, 2021	21	MF	(England) Billy Garton Jr.	None	Released	
January 1, 2022	6	MF	(Mexico) Bryan de la Fuente	None	Released	
February 11, 2022	5	DF	(United States) Michael Bryant	(United States) Detroit City	Free	
February 19, 2022	1	GK	(United States) Mitch North	(United States) Central Valley Fuego	Free	
March 18, 2022	8	MF	(Chile) Alejandro Araneda	(United States) North Texas SC	Free	
March 24, 2022	18	MF	(United States) Evan Waldrep	(United States) Syracuse Pulse	Free	
September 30, 2022	11	MF	(United States) Shane Kaemerle	(Slovakia) Dukla Banská Bystrica	Undisclosed	

=== Loans in ===
No.	Player	From	Loan begin	Loan end	Source
21	(United States) Francis Jacobs	(United States) Orange County SC	April 1, 2022	November 30, 2022	

== Competitions ==
=== Friendlies ===
March 26	California United Strikers	0–0	Valley United	Irvine, CA
19:00 PST		Report		Stadium: Championship Soccer Stadium

=== NISA ===
==== Table ====
Pos	Team	Pld	W	D	L	GF	GA	GD	Pts	PPG	Qualification
1	California United Strikers FC	21	14	4	3	35	12	+23	46	2.19	Qualification for the semi-finals
2	Chattanooga FC	24	14	7	3	44	21	+23	49	2.04	Qualification for the semi-finals
3	Michigan Stars FC	23	10	8	5	27	15	+12	38	1.65	Qualification for the play-offs
4	Albion San Diego	20	9	5	6	28	23	+5	32	1.60	Qualification for the play-offs
5	Maryland Bobcats FC	23	8	6	9	32	28	+4	30	1.30	Qualification for the play-offs

Source: nisasoccer.com
Rules for classification: 1) points; 2) goal differential; 3) goals scored; 4) head-to-head

==== Results summary ====
Overall								Home						Away					
Pld	W	D	L	GF	GA	GD	Pts	W	D	L	GF	GA	GD	W	D	L	GF	GA	GD
21	14	4	3	35	12	+23	46	7	3	1	24	9	+15	7	1	2	11	3	+8

Last updated: October 22, 2022.
Source: NISA

==== Results by round ====
Game Week	1	2	3	4	5	6	7	8	9	10	11	12	13	14	15	16	17	18	19	20	21	22	23	24
Stadium	H	A	H	A	A	A	H	H	A	H	A	A	A	H	H	H	A	H	H	A	H	A	H	A
Result	D	W	W	W	W	W	W	W	W	W	L	W	W	D	D	L	D	W	W	L	D	P	P	P
Position	5	3	1	1	1	1	1	1	1	1	1	1	1	1	1	1	1	1	1	1	1	1	1	1

Updated to match(es) played on October 15, 2022. Source: NISA
A = Away; H = Home; W = Win; D = Draw; L = Loss; P = Postponed
Notes: Positions show the situation at the end of the corresponding Game Weeks (GW); not the position at the conclusion of matches or game days

==== Match reports ====
Win Draw Loss Fixtures

April 2 1	California United Strikers	0–0	Bay Cities FC	Irvine, CA
16:00 PST	Hogbin (yellow card) 9'; Treinen (yellow card) 25'; Medina (yellow card) 27'	Report	Aguilar (yellow card) 16'; Orendain (yellow card) 55'; Liborio Jr. (yellow card) 87'	Stadium: Championship Soccer Stadium

April 16 2	LA Force	0–2	California United Strikers	Lake Forest, CA
13:00 PST	Torr (yellow card) 12'; Amo (yellow card) 33'	Report	Hogbin 30'; Bowers 34'	Stadium: Orange County Great Park Field 10

April 23 3	California United Strikers	4–3	Bay Cities FC	Irvine, CA
20:00 PST	Lopez 7'; Nuño 39', 90+2'; Valencia 45+1'; Contreras 75'	Report	Penner (yellow card) 11'; Orendain 29', 79'; Dean (yellow card) 64'	Stadium: Championship Soccer Stadium

May 1 4	Syracuse Pulse	0–1	California United Strikers	Syracuse, NY
16:00 PST	DaSilva (yellow card) 58'	Report	Nuño (yellow card) 74'; Lopez 78'	Stadium: Lazer Stadium

May 4 5	Flower City Union	1–2	California United Strikers	Batavia, NY
16:00 PST	Canas-Jarquin 32'; Lee (yellow card) 78'	Report	Nuño 36'; Kadono 61'; Treinen (yellow card) 62'	Stadium: Vandetta Stadium
Note: Match played at Vandetta Stadium, Batavia instead of the Flower City Union's normal stadium, Marina Auto Stadium, Rochester, due to venue conflicts.

May 14 6	Bay Cities FC	0–1	California United Strikers	Redwood City, CA
00:00 PST				Stadium: Terremere Field

May 28 7	California United Strikers	1–0	Flower City Union	Irvine, CA
00:00 PST				Stadium: Championship Soccer Stadium

June 5 8	California United Strikers	2–0	Michigan Stars	Irvine, CA
00:00 PST				Stadium: Championship Soccer Stadium

June 10 9	Albion San Diego	0–3	California United Strikers	San Diego, CA
00:00 PST				Stadium: Canyon Crest Stadium

June 26 10	California United Strikers	5–0	LA Force	Irvine, CA
00:00 PST				Stadium: Championship Soccer Stadium

August 3 11	Maryland Bobcats	1–0	California United Strikers	Boyds, MD
00:00 PST				Stadium: Maryland SoccerPlex

August 6 12	Michigan Stars	0–1	California United Strikers	Romeo, MI
00:00 PST				Stadium: Barnabo Field

August 10 13	Chattanooga FC	0–1	California United Strikers	Chattanooga, TN
00:00 PST				Stadium: Finley Stadium

August 20 14	California United Strikers	1–1	Albion San Diego	Irvine, CA
00:00 PST				Stadium: Championship Soccer Stadium

September 4 15	California United Strikers	2–2	Chattanooga FC	Irvine, CA
00:00 PST				Stadium: Championship Soccer Stadium

September 17 16	California United Strikers	1–2	Albion San Diego	Irvine, CA
00:00 PST				Stadium: Championship Soccer Stadium

September 24 17	LA Force	0–0	California United Strikers	Wilmington, CA
00:00 PST				Stadium: LAHC Stadium

September 28 18	California United Strikers	3–1	Syracuse Pulse	Irvine, CA
00:00 PST				Stadium: Championship Soccer Stadium

October 5 19	California United Strikers	2–0	Maryland Bobcats	Irvine, CA
00:00 PST				Stadium: Championship Soccer Stadium

October 8 20	Albion San Diego	1–0	California United Strikers	San Diego, CA
00:00 PST				Stadium: Canyon Crest Stadium

October 15 21	California United Strikers	3–0	LA Force	Irvine, CA
00:00 PST				Stadium: Championship Soccer Stadium

October 19 22	Valley United	—	California United Strikers	Mesa, AZ
00:00 PST				Stadium: Bell Bank Park
Note: Cancelled following Valley United's withdrawal from NISA.

October 23 23	California United Strikers	—	Valley United	Irvine, CA
00:00 PST				Stadium: Championship Soccer Stadium
Note: Cancelled following Valley United's withdrawal from NISA.

October 26 24	Bay Cities FC	—	California United Strikers	Redwood City, CA
00:00 PST				Stadium: Terremere Field
Note: Cancelled following Bay Cities FC's withdrawal from NISA.

=== NISA Playoffs ===
October 29 Semifinals	California United Strikers	2–4	Albion San Diego	Irvine, CA
19:00 PST	Nuño 39' (pen.); Vedamanikan (yellow card) 44'; Kadono 51' (yellow card) 65'; Hogbin (yellow card) 78'	Report	Carreon 17'; Mitchell (yellow card) 21'; Malango 38'; Bazaes 74'; Diakhate 83'	Stadium: Championship Soccer Stadium; Attendance: 3,192

=== U.S. Open Cup ===
April 7 Second round	California United Strikers (NISA)	5–0	(California) San Fernando Valley FC (UPSL)	Irvine, CA
00:00 PST	Lee 4'; López-Carrillo 15', 78'; Bowers 31'; Farias 71'			Stadium: Championship Soccer Stadium

April 19 Third round	FC Tucson (USL1) (Arizona)	1–2	California United Strikers FC (NISA)	Tucson, AZ
18:30 PST	Calixtro 17'	Report	Kurtz (yellow card) 45+2'; Nuño 71'; Kawashima 90+2'	Stadium: Kino North Stadium; Attendance: 528; Referee: Dejan Susak

May 11 Round of 32	California United Strikers (NISA)	2–3	(California) LA Galaxy (MLS)	Irvine, CA
19:30 PDT	Kadono 19'; Garcia-Lopez 88'	Report	Joveljić 45' (pen.), 83' (pen.); Álvarez (yellow card) 72'; Lambe 80'	Stadium: Championship Soccer Stadium; Attendance: 3,749; Referee: Samantha Martinez

== Statistics ==
As of October 15, 2022

No.	Pos	Nat	Player	Total		NISA		NISA Playoffs		U.S. Open Cup	
No.	Pos	Nat	Player	Apps	Goals	Apps	Goals	Apps	Goals	Apps	Goals
0	GK	(United States) USA	Steven Barrera	8	0	6+1	0	0+0	0	1+0	0
2	DF	(United States) USA	Gonzalo Salguero	19	1	12+5	1	0+0	0	0+2	0
3	DF	(United States) USA	Aydan Bowers	19	2	16+0	1	0+0	0	3+0	1
4	DF	(United States) USA	Garrett Hogbin	19	1	15+1	1	0+0	0	3+0	0
5	DF	(United States) USA	Xavier Fuerte	8	0	5+3	0	0+0	0	0+0	0
6	MF	(United States) USA	Duncan Capriotti	4	0	0+4	0	0+0	0	0+0	0
7	MF	(Mexico) MEX	Luis Garcia Sosa	9	0	7+2	0	0+0	0	0+0	0
8	FW	(United States) USA	Tony Lopez	16	8	11+2	6	0+0	0	3+0	2
9	FW	(Mexico) MEX	Omar Nuño	19	9	15+1	8	0+0	0	3+0	1
10	MF	(United States) USA	Gustavo Villalobos	17	1	8+7	1	0+0	0	1+1	0
11	MF	(United States) USA	Shane Kaemerle	10	0	5+3	0	0+0	0	2+0	0
12	DF	(United States) USA	Marc Bermudez	4	0	4+0	0	0+0	0	0+0	0
13	MF	(United States) USA	Felipe Liborio Jr.	20	0	17+0	0	0+0	0	3+0	0
14	FW	(United States) USA	Andy Contreras	12	2	5+6	2	0+0	0	0+1	0
15	FW	(Spain) ESP	Alex Vedamanikam	17	2	4+12	2	0+0	0	1+0	0
16	FW	(United States) USA	Christian Thierjung	18	3	9+6	3	0+0	0	0+3	0
17	DF	(United States) USA	Brady Treinen	11	0	8+0	0	0+0	0	3+0	0
18	MF	(United States) USA	Leonel Alvarenga	15	1	7+8	1	0+0	0	0+0	0
19	MF	(United States) USA	Bay Kurtz	10	0	7+1	0	0+0	0	2+0	0
20	MF	(United States) USA	Caleb Suh	3	0	2+1	0	0+0	0	0+0	0
22	DF	(United States) USA	Kevin Garcia-Lopez	16	1	13+1	0	0+0	0	0+2	1
23	MF	(Japan) JPN	Shinya Kadono	19	3	13+3	2	0+0	0	1+2	1
24	DF	(United States) USA	Joseph Patrick Pérez	0	0	0+0	0	0+0	0	0+0	0
25	MF	(Brazil) BRA	Guilherme Farias	8	2	3+4	1	0+0	0	0+1	1
29	FW	(United States) USA	Marcus Lee	6	1	3+0	0	0+0	0	3+0	1
30	FW	(United States) USA	Bryan Medina	2	0	1+1	0	0+0	0	0+0	0
32	DF	(United States) USA	Ethan Gonzalez	1	0	1+0	0	0+0	0	0+0	0
33	GK	(Haiti) HAI	Jean Gamain Antoine	16	0	14+0	0	0+0	0	2+0	0
34	MF	(Japan) JPN	Ryotaro Kawashima	13	3	9+3	2	0+0	0	0+1	1
