= Victor Rojas (footballer) =

Venezuelan footballer (born 1995)

Personal information
- Full name: Victor Alfonzo Rojas Ford
- Date of birth: 18 February 1995 (age 31)
- Place of birth: Miranda, Venezuela
- Height: 1.78 m (5 ft 10 in)
- Position: Midfielder

Team information
- Current team: Club de Lyon
- Number: 10

Youth career
- –2014: Mineros de Guayana
- 2014: Seattle Sounders FC
- 2014–2016: Coras de Nayarit

Senior career*
Years	Team	Apps	(Gls)
2016–2017	Florida Tropics (indoor)	18	(8)
2017	Lakeland Tropics	10	(6)
2018	Sampedrense		
2018–2019	Nogueirense	4	(0)
2019	Las Vegas Lights	10	(0)
2020–2021	OFC Barca	3	(5)
2023–	Club de Lyon	11	(8)
- * Club domestic league appearances and goals as of September 13, 2023

Victor Alfonzo Rojas Ford (born 18 February 1995) is a Venezuelan footballer who plays as a midfielder for Club de Lyon in the National Independent Soccer Association.

Rojas began his professional career playing in the Major Arena Soccer League with Florida Tropics SC. He also featured for the Tropics' outdoor USL PDL side, scoring a brace in his final game with the organization.

In March 2021, Rojas was named to the United Premier Soccer League 2020 Fall Season First Team, having tallied 13 goals and 10 assists in 15 games.
