= Savannah Clovers FC =

American soccer team in Savannah, Georgia

- Full name: Savannah Clovers Football Club
- Founded: June 23, 2016; 9 years ago
- Stadium: Memorial Stadium; Savannah, GA
- Capacity: 5,000
- Owner: Brian Sykes
- Head Coach: David Proctor
- League: NISA
- 2024: 4th. of East Conference (no playoffs)
Home colours

Savannah Clovers FC is an American professional soccer team based in Savannah, Georgia. The team was founded in 2016 and competed in the National Independent Soccer Association, a third tier league of the United States soccer league system.

== History ==
=== United Premier Soccer League ===
Savannah Clovers FC was founded in 2016 by a group of local soccer enthusiasts who wanted to create a platform for high-level soccer in Savannah. The team's name is a reference to the city's emblem, which features a clover, and the team's colors are green and white.

On August 3, 2017, the team joined the United Premier Soccer League (UPSL) for spring 2018 and played its first season in the UPSL's Southeast Conference. Despite being a new team in a competitive league, the Savannah Clovers FC finished the season with a respectable record of four wins, four losses, and two draws.

In 2018, the team improved its performance, finishing second in the Southeast Conference and earning a spot in the NPSL playoffs. Although the team was eliminated in the first round of the playoffs, the season was considered a success and helped to establish the Savannah Clovers FC as a competitive team in the league.

The team's success continued in 2019, as the Savannah Clovers FC finished first in the Southeast Conference and advanced to the second round of the playoffs. The team's strong performance was recognized by the league, as several Savannah Clovers FC players were named to the All-Conference team.

=== National Independent Soccer Association ===
On January 11, 2022, it was announced that the club would move up to the fully professional level, joining National Independent Soccer Association (NISA) for 2023 season. According to the club, it would be the first professional soccer season in the city of Savannah.

The Savannah Clovers made their U.S. Open Cup debut on April 4, 2023, losing 4-1 to Charleston Battery. The Clovers struggled in their early professional seasons, finishing with a 4-7-13 record in 2023, and a 5-3-12 record in 2024.

In June 2025, Clovers' general manager and co-owner Brian Sykes announced that the team would not be competing in 2025, due to the NISA not being sanctioned by the United States Soccer Federation in the 2025 season. Sykes also commented that the club had "other options" available if the USSF rejects NISA's application for sanctioning in 2026.

=== Season-by-season ===
Season	League	Conf	P	W	D	L	GF	GA	GD	Pts	PPG	Position	Playoffs	U.S. Open Cup
2018 Spring	UPSL	DMV North	14	9	0	5	46	24	+22	27	1.93	3rd	DNQ	DNQ
2018 Fall	UPSL	Mid-Atlantic	10	7	0	3	30	20	+10	21	2.10	2nd	DNQ	DNQ
2019 Spring	UPSL	Mid-Atlantic	10	2	1	7	9	22	-13	7	0.70	5th	DNQ	DNQ
2020 Fall	UPSL	Mid-Atlantic	10	3	2	5	18	15	+3	11	1.10	5th	DNQ	Cancelled
2021 Fall	UPSL	Georgia	10	0	3	7	4	44	-40	3	0.30	11th	DNQ	Cancelled
2023	NISA	-	24	4	7	13	19	47	-28	19	0.79	8th	DNQ	Second Round
2024	NISA	East	20	5	3	12	24	42	-18	18	0.90	4th	DNQ	Second Round
Total	-	-	98	30	16	52	150	214	-64	27	1.08	-	-	-

== Team and Supporters ==
The Savannah Clovers FC is owned by the club's supporters, who hold shares in the team and have a say in its management and decision-making. The team has a dedicated group of supporters, known as the Clover Nation.

The team's home field is the Memorial Stadium in Savannah, Georgia, which has a capacity of 5,000 spectators.

== Players and staff ==
=== Current roster ===
As of April 2, 2023

Note: Flags indicate national team as defined under FIFA eligibility rules; some limited exceptions apply. Players may hold more than one non-FIFA nationality.

No.	Pos.	Nation	Player
1	GK	USA	Jack Pondy
3	DF	USA	Theo Wichmann
4	DF	USA	Noe Jimenez
6	MF	USA	Mason Moyers
7	FW	CYP	Alexandros Ierides
8	MF	USA	Aaron Martinez
9	FW	USA	Joel Bunting
10	MF	RUS	Yasha Pomozov
11	MF	USA	Ahdan Tait
12	GK	USA	Russell Robles
13	DF	USA	Mateo Villafrade
14	MF	USA	Zack Hargreaves

No.	Pos.	Nation	Player
15	FW	USA	Andy Sanchez
16	DF	USA	Mikal Greene
17	DF	USA	Ford Hunt
18	MF	USA	Andrew Barrowman
19	DF	USA	Shandon Wright
21	MF	USA	Jedidiah McCloud
22	FW	USA	Benjamin Mackay
24	FW	USA	Alex Woods
25	DF	USA	Jelle Koridon
26	DF	USA	Sonny Quintanilla
28	FW	PUR	Lester Hayes III
