= 2025 National Independent Soccer Association Pro Cup =

National Independent Soccer Association
- Season: 2025
- Dates: Oct. 13 – Oct. 21
- Champions: Los Angeles Force
- Matches: 15
- Goals: 58 (3.87 per match)
- Best Player: (United States) Joel Quist
- Top goalscorer: (United States) Joel Quist (5 goals)
- Biggest home win: Capo FC 6–0 Modesto City FC (Oct. 17)
- Biggest away win: Modesto City FC 1–12 Sin City FC (Oct. 15)
- Highest scoring: Modesto City FC 1–12 Sin City FC (Oct. 15)
- Longest winning run: Capo FC (2 games)
- Longest unbeaten run: Capo FC; Los Angeles Force (3 games)
- Longest losing run: Modesto City FC (3 games)

The 2025 National Independent Soccer Association Pro Cup was a tournament organized by the National Independent Soccer Association. After the United States Soccer Federation withdrew its sanctioning of the league, the league decided to stage a tournament. The Los Angeles Force, the defending champions, won the tournament by defeating Capo FC.

== Changes from 2024 ==
In December 2024, several sources reported that the league was not given professional sanctioning for the 2025 season, though the league would later dispute these claims. The league later announced the 2025 NISA Pro Cup tournament, to be held in the fall, as part of its application for continued USSF sanctioning, with the intention of returning to a full season in 2026. The tournament consisted of eight teams from six leagues, including Capo FC and Los Angeles Force of NISA. The group stage was held between October 13 and 17, with the semifinals held on October 19 and the finals on October 21. All games were played at Total Sports Park in Washington, Michigan.

On July 21, 2025, Matt Morse, previously the Managing Director of NISA Nation, was appointed CEO of NISA. Two days later, retired American soccer player Chandler Hoffman was appointed league commissioner.

== Pro Cup ==
=== Group A ===
Pos	Team	Pld	W	D	L	GF	GA	GD	Pts	Qualification
1	Los Angeles Force (C)	3	2	1	0	6	3	+3	7	Playoff semifinals
2	Peak Eleven FC	3	1	1	1	3	4	−1	4	Playoff semifinals
3	Arkansas Wolves FC	3	1	0	2	6	7	−1	3	
4	DC Hyper	3	1	0	2	3	4	−1	3	

Source: National Independent Soccer Association
Rules for classification: 1) points; 2) total wins; 3) head-to-head points; 4) goal differential; 5) most goals
(C) Champions

=== Group B ===
Pos	Team	Pld	W	D	L	GF	GA	GD	Pts	Qualification
1	Capo FC	3	2	1	0	9	2	+7	7	Playoff semifinals
2	Northern Colorado Hailstorm FC	3	2	0	1	6	2	+4	6	Playoff semifinals
3	Sin City FC	3	1	1	1	13	3	+10	4	
4	Modesto City FC	3	0	0	3	1	22	−21	0	

Source: National Independent Soccer Association
Rules for classification: 1) points; 2) total wins; 3) head-to-head points; 4) goal differential; 5) most goals

=== Semifinals ===
October 19, 2025	Los Angeles Force	2–0	Northern Colorado Hailstorm FC	Washington, Michigan
10:00	Enzo Mauriz 52'; Jose Montes de Oca 87'	Report		Stadium: Michigan Stars Sports Center

October 19, 2025	Capo FC	2–0	Peak Eleven FC	Washington, Michigan
10:35	Julian Svoboda; Dakota Hatzenbeller	Report		Stadium: Michigan Stars Sports Center

=== Finals ===
October 21, 2025	Los Angeles Force	4–1	Capo FC	Washington, Michigan
11:00	Salazar 74'; Joel Quist 96', 100'; Bryan Ortega 120'	Report	Daniel Moreno	Stadium: Michigan Stars Sports Center

== Player statistics ==
=== Top goalscorers ===
Rank	Player	Club	Goals
1	(United States) Joel Quist	Los Angeles Force	5
2	(United States) Bryan Ortega	Los Angeles Force	2
2	(Belize) Michael Salazar	Los Angeles Force	2
