= Joel Bunting =

American soccer player (born 1997)

Personal information
- Date of birth: December 2, 1997 (age 28)
- Place of birth: Charleston, South Carolina, U.S.
- Height: 6 ft 0 in (1.83 m)
- Position: Forward

Youth career
- 2014–2015: Daniel Island Soccer Academy

College career
Years	Team	Apps	(Gls)
2016–2019	USC Upstate Spartans	54	(8)

Senior career*
Years	Team	Apps	(Gls)
2018	Greenville FC	5	(0)
2020	Charleston United	?	(2)
2021–2022	Charleston Battery	20	(4)
2023	Savannah Clovers	21	(2)
Total		46+	(8)
- * Club domestic league appearances and goals as of April 2, 2023

Joel Bunting (born December 2, 1997) is an American former professional soccer player who played as a forward.

== Career ==
=== Youth ===
Bunting graduated from Bishop England High School. During his time in high school, he was named All-State three times during his prep career and also received three Golden Boot Awards. Bunting also played club soccer for Daniel Island Soccer Academy, where he scored 26 goals and tallied 24 assists between 2014 and 2015.

=== College and amateur ===
Bunting played college soccer at the University of South Carolina Upstate between 2016 and 2019. During his time with the Spartans, Bunting made 54 appearances across four seasons, tallying eight goals and three assists. He was named to the ASUN All-Freshman Team in 2016.

In 2018, Bunting also played with NPSL side Greenville FC, making five appearances.

2020 saw Bunting appear with local UPSL side Charleston United during their 2020 Spring season.

=== Professional ===
Following a successful trial stint with the club, Bunting signed with USL Championship side Charleston Battery on May 21, 2021. He made his debut for the club on June 8, 2021, appearing as a 56th-minute substitute during a 1–0 win over Loudoun United. He scored his first professional goal on June 18, 2021, netting the winning goal in a 2–1 win over the Miami FC.

Bunting was released by Charleston following the 2021 season, but re-signed with the club on a short-term deal on September 22, 2022. Following the 2022 season, Bunting was again released by Charleston.
