= Mitch North =

American soccer player (born 1995)

Personal information
- Full name: Mitchell North
- Date of birth: February 9, 1995 (age 31)
- Place of birth: Medford, Oregon, United States
- Height: 1.88 m (6 ft 2 in)
- Position: Goalkeeper

Team information
- Current team: Irvine Zeta
- Number: 1

Youth career
- 2012–2013: Portland Timbers

College career
Years	Team	Apps	(Gls)
2013	Oregon State Beavers	0	(0)
2014–2017	Sonoma State Seawolves	57	(0)

Senior career*
Years	Team	Apps	(Gls)
2017	Burlingame Dragons	3	(0)
2021	California United Strikers	10	(0)
2022–2023	Central Valley Fuego	30	(0)
2024–	Irvine Zeta	14	(0)
- * Club domestic league appearances and goals as of October 14, 2024

Mitch North (born February 4, 1995) is an American soccer player who currently plays as a goalkeeper.

== Career ==
=== Youth & college ===
North was born in Medford, Oregon, but was raised in Jacksonville, Oregon. He attended both South Medford High School and Canby High School, and was a First Team All-State pick as a junior. In his senior year, he played with the Portland Timbers academy.

In 2013, North attended Oregon State University to play college soccer. He didn't play for the Beavers during 2013, redshirting the season. North transferred to Sonoma State University in 2014, where he went on to make 57 appearances for the Seawolves over four seasons and earned an honorable Mention All-CCAA in 2015. Again in 2016, North was a regular starter for Sonoma State, recording 66 saves, a career-high seven shutouts in 20 starts, and receiving another honorable mention recognition in the CCAA.

In 2017, North played in the USL PDL, making three appearances for Burlingame Dragons.

=== Professional ===
On February 23, 2021, North was announced as a new signing for NISA club California United Strikers. He went on to make ten regular season appearances for the Strikers.

On February 22, 2022, North signed with USL League One expansion club Central Valley Fuego FC ahead of their inaugural season. He made his debut for the club on April 5, 2022, appearing as an 83rd–minute substitute during a 4–1 win over USL Championship side El Paso Locomotive in a US Open Cup fixture.

North returned to playing in NISA, joining Irvine Zeta FC for their 2024 season.
