= Georgia FC =

- Full name: Georgia Football Club
- Founded: 2024; 2 years ago
- Stadium: Atlanta Silverbacks Park
- Capacity: 5,000
- Head Coach: Kerem Daser
- League: National Independent Soccer Association
- Website: gafcpro.com
Home colors	Away colors

Georgia FC is an American professional soccer club based in Atlanta, that plays in the National Independent Soccer Association (NISA), the third tier of the United States soccer league system.

== History ==
In 2024 as Georgia Lions FC, the club was joining the National Independent Soccer Association for the 2024 season and also the first Indian-woman-owned professional soccer club in the United States with co-ownerships Patrick Vierhout and Sunita Patel. On March 18, it was announced via X that Georgia Lions FC would forfeit their match against Apotheos FC in the 2024 U.S. Open Cup as a result of unspecified front office issues following controversies surrounding East Atlanta Dutch Lions FC of USL League Two, which also owned by Patrick Vierhout. In April, the club was officially rebranded as Georgia FC. Georgia FC finished their inaugural season with a record of 5 wins, 2 draws, and 13 losses, finishing last in NISA's East Conference.

== Colors and Badge ==
Georgia FC's badge features a southern live oak, Georgia' state tree. According to the team website, the three branches of the tree represent Unity, Resilience, and Growth. The team colors are blue, red, and gold.

== Stadium ==
Beginning in 2024, Georgia FC plays its home games at Atlanta Silverbacks Park, a 5,000-seat soccer stadium originally built for the defunct Atlanta Silverbacks FC.

== Statistics and records ==
=== Season-by-season ===
Season	League	Div	P	W	D	L	GF	GA	Pts	Position	Playoffs	U.S. Open Cup	Top Scorer	
2024	NISA	East	20	5	2	13	24	39	14	5th, East Conference	DNQ	Round 1	(Nigeria) Patrick Okonkwo	6
