= Josue Cartagena =

American soccer player

Personal information
- Date of birth: November 15, 1998 (age 27)
- Place of birth: Panorama City, California, United States
- Height: 1.73 m (5 ft 8 in)
- Position: Midfielder

Team information
- Current team: Flower City Union
- Number: 4

College career
Years	Team	Apps	(Gls)
2016	COC Cougars	19	(2)
2018	Taft Cougars	23	(0)
2019–2021	Cal State Dominguez Hills Toros	30	(3)

Senior career*
Years	Team	Apps	(Gls)
2022	Chattanooga Red Wolves	10	(1)
2023–	Flower City Union	1	(0)
- * Club domestic league appearances and goals as of April 2, 2023

Josue Cartagena (born November 15, 1998) is an American soccer player who plays as a midfielder for Flower City Union, in the National Independent Soccer Association.

== Career ==
=== Youth ===
Cartagena attended and played soccer at James Monroe High School.

=== College ===
Cartagena attended College of the Canyons in 2016 to play college soccer, going on to make 19 appearances for the Cougars, scoring two goals. Cartagena played his second year of eligibility at Taft College in 2018, where he played 23 goals and added two assists to his name. 2019 saw Cartagena transfer again, this time to California State University, Dominguez Hills, playing 30 games, scoring three goals and tallying a single assist in two seasons.

=== Professional ===
On January 25, 2022, Cartagena signed with USL League One club Chattanooga Red Wolves. He made his professional debut on April 2, 2022, appearing as an injury-time substitute in a 1–1 draw with Forward Madison. On March 15, 2023, Cartagena and Chattanooga mutually agreed to part ways.
