= Irvine Zeta FC =

Football club in California, US

- Full name: Irvine Zeta Football Club
- Nicknames: Zeta, IZFC
- Founded: 2022; 4 years ago
- Stadium: Championship Soccer Stadium; Irvine, California
- Capacity: 5,000
- Owner: Alex Filipovic
- League: UPSL; NISA
- Website: zetafc.com
Home colours

Irvine Zeta FC (known as Irvine Zeta FC, IZFC, and Irvine Zeta) is a professional soccer team based in Irvine, California. The club is established and financially backed by Chinese investors, the first Chinese-founded professional soccer team in the United States. It is the inaugural professional football club bearing the name of the city of Irvine. The club fields a senior team in the National Independent Soccer Association, as well as teams in NISA Nation, the UPSL, and youth leagues.

== History ==
Zeta FC was established in September 2022 in Irvine, California by Cary Lyu. The club began play in the United Premier Soccer League in 2023, reaching the 2023 UPSL Spring League Division 1 Tier playoffs.

On March 16, 2023, Zeta FC submitted the application to join the National Independent Soccer Association for the 2024 season. On May 22, Zeta FC received NISA's approval.

=== NISA ===
Irvine Zeta FC made their U.S. Open Cup debut on March 20, 2024, defeating SC MesoAmerica, winners of the 2023 National Amateur Cup, 1-0. The team would go on to defeat Ventura County FC in the second round, 3-0, before falling to Monterey Bay FC in the third round.

Irvine Zeta FC kicked off its first professional season in April 2024. Irvine finished the 2024 season with a record of 11 wins, 4 draws, and 3 losses, second-best in the West Conference. Zeta FC defeated the Michigan Stars FC in the semifinal, 3-0 to advance to their first NISA Championship Game. The game ended 1-1, with Irvine losing to Los Angeles Force 3-2 in penalty kicks.

== Colors and badge ==
Irvine Zeta's crest prominently features a lower-case orange zeta, with "IRVINE" across the top, and a stylized soccer ball and "FC" on the right side. The team's colors are two different shades of blue, with orange and white as accent colors.

== Stadium ==
Zeta FC shares the Championship Soccer Stadium with other teams in Irvine. The stadium is part of the Great Park Sports Complex in Orange County, California. Built in 2017, the stadium has an overall capacity of 5,000, combines with sports infrastructures such as training fields, a box office, concession areas, etc.

== Roster ==
As of
NO.	Name	Position
1	Mitch North	GK
12	Matthew Escareno	GK
30	Jake Hansen	GK
45	Braeden Hatt	GK
4	Aaron Keita	CB
2	Greg Stratton	CB
10	Edson Alvarado	CM
27	Miguel Pena	LB
13	Israel Espinoza	CB
33	Alex Culwell	CB
6	Andrew Kleszewski	CM
27	Edgardo Artero	MF
14	Danny Moreno	CM
3	Joey Ciochetto	CM
8	Jonathan Estrada	CM
11	Shinya Kadono	FW
9	Christian Fernandes Fecula	FW
18	Marcel Salceda	FW
19	George Almeida	FW

== Club staff ==
2024 Season
Role	Staff
President	Cary Lyu
General Manager	Ivan Todorovic
Marketing Manager	Key Wang
PR Manager	Alex Filipovic
Academy Director	Platini Soaf
Administration	Dekel Keinan

== Club trophies ==
Year	League	Title
2023	2023 UPSL Spring League Division 1 Tier	Champions
2023	2023 Del Real Foods SoCal Regional Cup	Champions
