= Arizona Monsoon FC =

American professional soccer club

- Nickname: AMFC
- Founded: June 15, 2023; 2 years ago
- Stadium: Matt O. Hanhila Field; Glendale, Arizona
- Owner: Troy Pearce
- Coach: Carlos Padilla
- League: NISA
- 2024: 4th, West Conference; Playoffs: DNQ
Home colors

Arizona Monsoon FC (AMFC) is an American men's professional soccer club located in Glendale, Arizona. AMFC's first season was the 2024 National Independent Soccer Association season, coached by Carlos Padilla, a former professional player.

== History ==
On June 15, 2023, the National Independent Soccer Association announced Arizona Monsoon FC had applied to be a member of the league for the 2024 season. On February 16, 2024, NISA announced Arizona Monsoon FC as part of the four–team West Conference for the 2024 season. Arizona's first competitive game came on 21 March 2024 in the 2024 U.S. Open Cup. Though they took a lead into halftime, but ultimately fell 2–1 to the amateur side Lubbock Matadors SC in the first round. The Monsoon finished their inaugural season with no wins and only one draw in sixteen games, the worst record in the league.

== Affiliations and Development ==
Arizona Monsoon has an affiliation with Cruz Azul, United Latinos SC, and Grande Football Club. Arizona Monsoon also supports a youth program that plays in the Arizona Soccer Association, Desert Conference of United States Youth Soccer Association, and have Union Maricopa, their semi-professional team that plays in the United Premier Soccer League.

== Players and staff ==
=== Current roster ===
As of April 27, 2024

Note: Flags indicate national team as defined under FIFA eligibility rules; some limited exceptions apply. Players may hold more than one non-FIFA nationality.

No.	Pos.	Nation	Player
0	GK	USA	Jose Cortez-Cruz
1	GK	USA	Brandon Barnes
2	DF	USA	Austin Cuevas
3	MF	USA	Jaden Gonzalez
4	DF	USA	Noe Jimenez
5	DF	USA	Cedric Jeanty
6	MF	USA	Kevin Mearse
8	MF	USA	Cesar Morquecho
9	FW	USA	Alex Tejera
10	FW	USA	Ricardo Velazco
11	DF	USA	Jesus Ruiz Flores
12	MF	USA	Izsak Fierro

No.	Pos.	Nation	Player
13	MF	USA	Jesus Ruiz
14	FW	USA	Freddy Aguilar
15			Kaw Co
16	MF	JPN	Daisuke Otsuka
17	FW	USA	Yahir Gonzalez-Garcia
18	FW	USA	Karl Bercy
19	MF	USA	Giancarlo Cañas-Jarquin
20	MF	USA	Isaias German
23	MF	USA	Alex Hernandez
24	GK	USA	Derek Hatcher
30	MF	MEX	Carlos Valenzuela
49	MF	USA	Jason Almanza

=== Staff ===
Executive
Majority owner	Troy Pearce
President & Sporting director	Marcelo Piana
Executive Director of Operations	Lanny Gholston
Director of Scouting	Adam Zelmanowicz
Coaching Staff
Head coach	Carlos Padilla
Assistant coach	Noel Castillo
Assistant coach	Kevin Mearse
Assistant coach	
Goalkeeper coach	
Head Athletic Trainer	Edwin Vasquez

Source: Staff

== Statistics and records ==
=== Season-by-season ===
As of September 22, 2024

Season	League												Position		Playoffs	U.S. Open Cup	Independent Cup	Top Scorer	
Season	Div	League	Conference	Pld	W	D	L	GF	GA	GD	Pts	PPG	Conf.	Overall	Playoffs	U.S. Open Cup	Independent Cup	Name	Goals
2024	3	NISA	West	16	0	1	15	7	45	-38	1	0.06	4th	9th	DNQ	First Round	First Round	(United States) Izsak Fierro (United States) Isaias German (Japan) Daisuke Otsuka	1

1. Top goalscorer(s) includes all goals scored in League, U.S. Open Cup, NISA Nation Playoffs, and other competitive matches.

=== Head coaches record ===
As of September 22, 2024

Coach	From	To	Record				
Coach	From	To	G	W	D	L	Win %
(United States) Carlos Padilla	2024	Present	18	0	1	17	0.00
Total			18	0	1	17	0.00

1. Includes NISA Regular Season, NISA Playoffs, Independent Cup, and U.S. Open Cup. Excludes friendlies.

== See also ==
- National Independent Soccer Association
