= Capo FC =

American soccer club

- Full name: Capistrano Football Club
- Founded: 2006; 20 years ago
- Stadium: JSerra Catholic High School
- President: Peter Carey
- Head Coach: Peter Carey
- League: NISA
- 2023: 6th, Southwest Division; Playoffs: DNQ
- Website: fccapistrano.org
Home colours

Capo FC, also known as Capistrano FC, is an American soccer club based in San Juan Capistrano, California.

== History ==
Capo FC was founded in 2006 with the mission of developing the youth soccer in the southern part of Orange County, California. The team currently competes locally in the SoCal Soccer League, N1, USLY, USLA, USL2, USLW, and NISA Professional League.

In June 2020, the team was accepted in the United Premier Soccer League with plans to begin play in Division 1 for the Fall 2020 season. Following a delay, Capo debuted in Spring 2021 and went on to win the SoCal South championship. The team was promoted to the Premier Division for Fall 2021 where it finished the regular season undefeated in the SoCal North Conference.

On November 30, 2021, the club announced it would join NISA Nation as members of its brand new Southwest Region.

Capo was announced as a new member of USL League Two in December 2022, with plans to begin play the following season.

=== Pro Team ===
On December 28, 2023, Capo FC announced it was launching a professional team to join the National Independent Soccer Association for the 2024 season. The team finished its inaugural professional season with a record of 4 wins, 3 draws, and 9 losses, finishing third out of four teams in the Western Conference.

Capistrano FC was announced as the third team confirmed for the 2025 NISA Pro Cup tournament, and the first team returning from the previous NISA season. Capo FC finished with 2 wins, 1 draw, and no losses in the Group Stage, defeating Peak XI FC of the Mountain Premier League in the Knockout Round before falling to Los Angeles Force in the finals, losing 4-1 in extra time.

=== Year-by-year ===
Pre-Professional Team

Year	League	Conference	Regular season (WDL)	Playoffs	U.S. Open Cup
2021	UPSL	SoCal South (Division 1)	Spring: 8-1-1 (1st out of 11)	N/A	Did not qualify
2021	UPSL	SoCal North (Premier)	Fall: 10-1-0 (1st out of 11)	Conference semifinals	Did not qualify
2022	NISA Nation	Southwest Region	8-1-1 (1st out of 6)	N/A	Fourth Qualifying Round
2023	USL League Two	Southwest Division	1-9-2 (6th out of 6)	Did not qualify	Second Round
2024	USL League Two	Southwest Division	5-2-7 (6th out of 8)	Did not qualify	Did not qualify
2025	USL League Two	Southwest Division	7-3-2 (3rd out of 9)	Did not qualify	Did not qualify
2026	USL League Two	Southwest Division	6-4-2 (3rd out of 8)	Did not qualify	Did not qualify
2027					Second Qualifying Round

Professional Team

Year	League	Conference	Regular season (WDL)	Playoffs	U.S. Open Cup
2024	NISA	Western Conference	4-3-9 (3rd out of 4)	Did not qualify	First Round

== Colors and badge ==
Capo FC's colors are blue and white. The club's crest features the bell tower of Mission Basilica San Juan Capistrano flanked by two cliff swallows, similar to those on the city's flag.
