= Shinya Kadono =

Japanese footballer

Personal information
- Date of birth: 30 January 1997 (age 29)
- Place of birth: Kobe, Hyōgo, Japan
- Height: 1.70 m (5 ft 7 in)
- Positions: Midfielder; forward

Team information
- Current team: Irvine Zeta
- Number: 11

College career
Years	Team	Apps	(Gls)
2015–2018	California Golden Bears	66	(20)

Senior career*
Years	Team	Apps	(Gls)
2017	Orange County U23	7	(2)
2018	San Francisco Glens	5	(1)
2019	Loudoun United	10	(1)
2019	→ South Georgia Tormenta (loan)	10	(1)
2020–2022	California United Strikers	42	(3)
2023	Albion San Diego	24	(2)
2024	Irvine Zeta	11	(1)
- * Club domestic league appearances and goals as of 10 October 2021

Shinya Kadono (born 30 January 1997) is a retired Japanese footballer who played as a midfielder for Irvine Zeta in the National Independent Soccer Association.

== Career ==
After a successful college career at Cal and one season in USL League Two with the San Francisco Glens, Kadono was selected by D.C. United in the 2019 MLS SuperDraft in the third round (72nd overall). Though D.C. United declined to offer him a contract in their preseason, he was signed by their USL Championship affiliate Loudoun United.

In May 2019, Kadono was called up to D.C. United for a friendly against La Liga side Real Betis Balompie.

On 27 July 2019, Kadono joined Tormenta FC on a loan for the remainder of the 2019 USL Championship season. He scored his first goal in his debut for Tormenta FC against Lansing Ignite FC that same day.

Kadono joined the California United Strikers on 26 February 2020.
