= Club de Lyon =

American soccer club

- Full name: Club de Lyon FC
- Nickname: Lions
- Founded: 2021; 5 years ago
- Stadium: Showalter Field
- Owner: Fabian Pourrain
- Head Coach: Joaquin Perez
- League: National Independent Soccer Association
- Website: clubdelyon.com
Home colors

Club de Lyon FC is an American professional soccer club based in Winter Park, Florida, that plays in the National Independent Soccer Association (NISA), as well as the National Premier Soccer League (NPSL), the third and fourth tier of the United States soccer league system, respectively.

== History ==
The club began operations as a semi-professional side that was part of the inaugural season of NISA Nation, as well as the Premier division of UPSL. After a highly successful 2022 season, in which it won the Florida Region championship of NISA Nation and went undefeated in the regular season of UPSL, the club applied to join NISA's professional league, and was officially accepted in November 2022, to begin play in the 2023 season.

On March 27, 2025, Club de Lyon FC announced it would be fielding a team in the National Premier Soccer League for the 2025 season, while still remaining a member of NISA while that league continued to seek sanctioning. The club competes in the Gulf Coast Sunshine Conference within the South Region.

== Stadium ==
For their inaugural season in NISA, Club de Lyon played its home matches in Daytona Beach, Florida, at Daytona Stadium. Beginning in 2024, Club de Lyon began play at Showalter Field in Winter Park, Florida, effectively relocating from Daytona Beach to the Orlando Metropolitan area. As a member of the NPSL, the club splits home games between Showalter Field and Lake Mary High School.

== Players and staff ==
=== Current roster ===
As of April 12, 2024

No.	Position	Nation	Player
1	GK	ARG	Álvaro Rezzano
2	DF	USA	Ivan Arenas
4	MF	ARG	Matias Cruz
5	DF	USA	Anthony Salorzano
6	DF	COL	Sebastian Mateus
7	FW	ARG	Juan Manuel Martínez
8	FW	USA	Yustin Rodriguez
9	FW	COL	Carlos Ibargüen
10	MF	ARG	Matias Pourrain
11	MF	USA	Pedro Hernandez
12	GK	VEN	Héctor Meléndez
13	DF	USA	Carter Burris
14	DF	USA	Tolunimi Ibikunle
15	DF	USA	Jean-Paul Lopez
16	DF	USA	Gabriel Ortiz
17	DF	FRA	Christopher Clement
18	DF	VEN	Jhansel Abreu Martinez
19	FW	USA	Malik Thom
20	DF	USA	Yoni Ramirez
21	DF	USA	Heath Martin
22	MF	USA	Victor Rolph
23	GK	BRA	Rafael dos Santos
24	DF	USA	Andrew Anyafo
26	FW	VEN	Johan Garcia
27	DF	ARG	Agustin Ortiz
28	MF	VEN	Jose Lara
29	FW	USA	Lukas Berg
32	DF	USA	Santiago Rodriguez
35	DF	USA	Matias Mercado
36	MF	USA	Christian Aragon Ruiz
37	GK	USA	Lincoln Hunt
55	DF	USA	Adil Gowani
91	GK	USA	Josue Mazon
