= National Independent Soccer Association =

Third division American soccer league

- Founded: June 6, 2017; 9 years ago
- First season: 2019–20
- Country: United States
- Confederation: CONCACAF (2019–2024); None (2025–present)
- Number of clubs: 9 (2024)
- League cup: NISA Independent Cup
- Current champions: Los Angeles Force (1st title) (2024)
- Most championships: Detroit City FC (2 titles)
- Website: nisasoccer.com

The National Independent Soccer Association (NISA) is a professional men's soccer league in the United States. The league began play in 2019 and is aiming to be in the third tier of American soccer. NISA initially used a fall-to-spring season format with a winter break but have switched to spring-to-fall which is more common in the United States. The league went on hiatus during the 2025 season but plans to resume play in fall 2026.

== History ==
=== League beginnings ===
Original league logo (2017–2021)

On June 6, 2017, it was announced that the newly formed National Independent Soccer Association would begin play in 2018 targeting an initial 8 to 10 teams, later revised to 8 to 12 teams. Initially, the league outlined plans to introduce a promotion/relegation system, once they reach their goal of 24 teams, the first in US professional soccer and in doing so act as a feeder league to the North American Soccer League (NASL); however, the NASL ceased operations prior to those plans being implemented.

On February 13, 2018, NISA co-founder Jack Cummins passed away suddenly. On May 17, 2018, NISA co-founder Peter Wilt left the NISA to help start up Forward Madison FC in Madison, Wisconsin in USL League One. A committee of club owners was formed to elect new leadership within the organization.

=== Reorganization and start of play ===
On August 31, 2018, NISA filed an application with the United States Soccer Federation (USSF) for sanctioning as a men's professional league, playing at the third division. On February 16, 2019, NISA received provisionally Division III sanctioning.

On June 10, 2019, it became known that both Miami FC and California United Strikers FC were approved at the recent board of governors meeting to join NISA, while the previously identified club in Central Florida would play in Baton Rouge, Louisiana instead of Daytona Beach, Florida. However, it was unclear whether either of the teams would start before the league's September start date. On June 27, 2019, it was announced that Oakland Roots SC would have their inaugural season with the league in the spring season, rather than the previously announced NPSL Founders Cup. On August 15, 2019, the league officially announced the addition of Oakland Roots for the 2019 season and Chattanooga FC, Detroit City FC, and Michigan Stars FC for early 2020.

The inaugural season began on August 31, 2019, with a 3–3 draw for Oakland Roots SC and California United Strikers FC in Oakland. On April 27, 2020, following previous postponements, the remainder of the 2019–20 season was canceled due to the COVID-19 pandemic.

On September 10, 2020, the league announced that one of the original co-founders of the league, Peter Wilt, would be rejoining the league in a club operations capacity by attempting to establish a club in Chicago. On September 15, 2020, one of the founding teams, Oakland Roots, announced that they were leaving the league to join the USL Championship, a league in the second division of professional soccer.

=== Development of the amateur and semi-professional game ===
On April 27, 2020, NISA revealed a new tournament called the NISA Independent Cup that would have member teams face off against high quality amateur and independent professional sides in a regional format. The tournament and 15 participating teams were announced on July 1.

NISA announced its first affiliation agreement with the Gulf Coast Premier League, a USASA affiliated amateur league based in the gulf coast of the United States, on August 13, 2020. The partnership is set to provide a pathway to professional status for both clubs and players, while also allowing two GCPL teams to qualify for future editions of the Independent Cup based on league play. This was expanded to include the Midwest Premier League and Eastern Premier Soccer League on September 3 and 4, 2020, respectively. On November 23, NISA announced a fourth agreement with the Mountain Premier League.

On September 17, 2020, the league announced that it was establishing a full-year amateur league, the NISA Nation, that would serve as an incubator for amateur and semi-professional clubs that wish to move into NISA's professional league. NISA stated that this full-season amateur league and its previously announced league affiliations would serve as the foundation of a fully open professional to amateur pyramid in the United States.

The league announced an "alliance" with semi-professional women's soccer league United Women's Soccer on January 28, 2021, with the target of launching a professional women's league in 2022. This proposed league would occupy the at the time vacant second tier of professional women's soccer in the United States. Many NISA clubs, including Detroit City FC, Michigan Stars FC, and NJ Teamsterz FC field or had announced fielding UWS and UWS2 teams.

The logo used from 2022 to 2024.

In December 2024, several sources reported that NISA was not given professional sanctioning for the 2025 season, though the league would later dispute these claims. The league later announced the 2025 NISA Pro Cup tournament to be held in the fall as part of the league's application for continued USSF sanctioning, with the intention of returning to a full season in 2026. The tournament consisted of eight teams from six leagues, including Capo FC and Los Angeles Force of NISA. The group stage was held between October 13 and 17, with the semifinals held on October 19 and the finals on October 21. All games were played Total Sports Park in Washington, Michigan.

On July 21, 2025, Matt Morse, previously the managing director of NISA Nation, was appointed CEO of NISA. Two days later, retired American soccer player Chandler Hoffman was appointed league commissioner.

=== 2026 reorganization and expansion efforts ===
In 2026, NISA announced organizational changes and strategic initiatives as part of an effort to seek renewed professional sanctioning from the USSF. The league expanded its leadership structure alongside chief executive officer Matt Morse and Commissioner Chandler Hoffman through a strategic partnership with RML Advisory Group. The group's leadership included Rob Lubin, who serves as president of NISA, and Harrison Krepack, who was appointed chief marketing officer to oversee communications, partnerships, and media initiatives.

According to the league, the partnership was intended to strengthen internal coordination, improve communication with member clubs, and support the league's commercial and operational planning ahead of a proposed return to professional play. The announcement also emphasized a more centralized marketing and communications strategy aimed at attracting new clubs and commercial partners.

As part of its restructuring efforts, NISA began recruiting prospective ownership groups and clubs with the goal of relaunching professional competition. The league indicated that it was targeting approximately 10 to 12 teams for a proposed return to professional play beginning in the fall of 2026. The league started play again on August 2026 with five teams.

== Teams ==
=== Current teams ===
Team	City	Stadium	Capacity	Founded	First season	Head coach
Capo FC	San Juan Capistrano, California	JSerra Catholic High School	2,989 (Note: Can accommodate 5,000 seats with portable bleachers.)	2006	2024	(United States) Erik Kirsch
Los Angeles Force	Long Beach, California	Clark Field	1,200	2019		(Israel) Dekel Keinan
Problems FC	Long Beach, California	Al Barbour Stadium	1,500	2018	2026	(United States) Mark Caudillo
Sin City FC	Las Vegas, Nevada	Mater Academy East High School	1,000	2024	2026	(United States) Gennette Martinez
STG Premier Pro	St. George, Utah	Snow Cannon High School	2,500	2024	2026	(United States) Eric McDonald

=== Former teams ===
Team	City	Joined	Final season	Fate
Arizona Monsoon FC	Glendale, Arizona	2023	2025	Folded
Atlanta SC	Alpharetta, Georgia	Fall 2019		Folded
Bay Cities FC	Redwood City, California	2021	2022	Folded
California United Strikers FC	Irvine, California	Fall 2019	2022	On hiatus
Chattanooga FC	Chattanooga, Tennessee	2020	2023	Moved to MLS Next Pro
Chicago House AC	Bridgeview, Illinois	Fall 2021		Moved to Midwest Premier League
Club de Lyon	Orlando, Florida	2022	2025	Moved to National Premier Soccer League
Detroit City FC	Hamtramck, Michigan	Spring 2020	Fall 2021	Moved to USL Championship
Flower City Union	Rochester, New York; Auburn, New York	2022	2023	Moved to National Premier Soccer League
Georgia FC	Atlanta, Georgia	2024	2025	Folded
Maryland Bobcats FC	Boyds, Maryland	2016	2025	Moved to NISA Nation.
Miami FC	Miami, Florida	Fall 2019		Moved to USL Championship
Michigan Stars FC	Washington, Michigan	1982	2024	On hiatus
New Amsterdam FC	Hempstead, New York	2020	2022	Folded
New York Cosmos	Uniondale, New York	2020		Folded; new iteration in USL League One
Philadelphia Fury	Philadelphia, Pennsylvania	Fall 2019		Folded
Oakland Roots SC	Oakland, California	Fall 2019	Fall 2020	Moved to USL Championship
San Diego 1904 FC	San Diego, California	Fall 2019	Fall 2021	Merged with Albion SC San Diego
Savannah Clovers FC	Savannah, Georgia	2016	2025	On hiatus
Stumptown AC	Matthews, North Carolina	Fall 2019	Fall 2021	Folded
Syracuse Pulse	Syracuse, New York	2021	2022	Merged with Flower City Union and rebranded as Salt City Union
Valley United FC	Mesa, Arizona	2020	2022	Folded

=== Timeline ===
Below are the teams that have historically participated in NISA. New teams for the 2026 Fall Season are to be announced in June.

== Champions ==
=== NISA League ===
Title number indicated in brackets ():

Ed.	Season	Champions	Score	Runner up	Venue	Att.	Date	Ref.
–	2019–20	(Season abandoned due to the COVID-19 pandemic)						
1	2020–21	Detroit City FC (1)	1–0	Los Angeles Force	Keyworth Stadium	7,231	3 Jul 2021	
2	2021	Detroit City FC (2)	n/a	California United Strikers	– (Note: Season champion determined by final table results)			
3	2022	Michigan Stars (1)	1–0	Albion San Diego	Romeo Stadium	1,178	6 Nov 2022	
4	2023	Flower City Union (1)	1–0	Michigan Stars	Romeo High School	1,016	11 Nov 2023	
5	2024	Los Angeles Force (1)	1–1 (3–2 p)	Irvine Zeta FC	Veterans Memorial Stadium	1,447	19 Oct 2024	

=== NISA League titles by team ===
Teams that no longer participate in the National Independent Soccer Association are in italics.

Team	Titles won	Winning years	Runners-up	Runners-up years	Seasons
Detroit City FC	2	2020–21, 2021	0	–	2
Los Angeles Force	1	2024	1	2020–21	5.5
Michigan Stars FC	1	2022	1	2023	5
Flower City Union	1	2023	0	–	2
Albion San Diego	0	–	1	2022	4.5
California United Strikers	0	–	1	2021	3.5
Irvine Zeta FC	0	–	1	2024	1

=== NISA Pro Cup Champions ===
Season	Champions	Score	Runner up	Venue	Attendance	Date
2025	Los Angeles Force	4–1	Capo FC	Michigan Stars Sports Center		October 21, 2025

=== NISA Independent Cup Champions ===
Year	Great Lakes	Midwest	Central Plains/ South Central	Southeast	Southern	Florida	Mid-Atlantic/ East	New England/ Northeast	Empire	Pacific	Southwest	West Coast	SoCal
2020	Detroit City FC	N/A	Gaffa FC (GCPL)	Chattanooga FC	N/A		Maryland Bobcats FC (NPSL)	N/A					N/A
2021	Detroit City FC	Milwaukee Torrent (NPSL)	Louisiana Krewe FC (GCPL)	Chattanooga FC	N/A		Maryland Bobcats FC	Lansdowne Yonkers FC (EPSL)	N/A	PDX FC (USL2)	California United Strikers FC	Los Angeles Force	N/A
2022	Michigan Stars FC	N/A	N/A	Chattanooga FC	N/A		Maryland Bobcats FC	Flower City Union	Syracuse Pulse	Wenatchee All-Stars FC (Cascadia Premier League)	Valley FC Raiders (NISA Nation)	Los Angeles Force	ASC San Diego
2023	Michigan Stars FC	Gold Star FC	N/A	Chattanooga FC	Savannah Clovers FC	Club de Lyon	Maryland Bobcats FC	Flower City Union	N/A	Los Angeles Force	N/A		ASC San Diego
2024	FC Milwaukee Torrent (NPSL)	N/A	N/A	Club de Lyon	N/A	N/A	Maryland Bobcats FC	N/A	N/A	Irvine Zeta FC	N/A	Los Angeles Force	N/A

== NISA Nation and affiliates ==
In addition to its professional division, NISA operates a full-season amateur league called NISA Nation. NISA's stated long-term goal is to have promotion and relegation between the professional division and NISA Nation, as well as between NISA Nation and seven affiliated regional leagues. Some of those affiliated leagues have entered into promotion and relegation agreements with other leagues, and so a pyramid can be constructed with NISA's Division III professional league at the top.

== See also ==
- NISA Nation
- United Soccer League, operator of several leagues in the US system, including:
  - USL Championship, the current second level
  - USL League One, also playing at the third level
- NPSL Members Cup
- Soccer in the United States
- Professional sports leagues in the United States
