= 2021 in American soccer =

Soccer in the United States
- Season: 2021

Men's soccer
- Supporters' Shield: New England Revolution
- USL Championship: Orange County SC
- USL League One: Union Omaha
- NISA: Detroit City FC
- NPSL: Denton Diablos FC
- USL League Two: Des Moines Menace
- US Open Cup: Canceled
- MLS Cup: New York City FC

Women's soccer
- NWSL: Washington Spirit
- UWS: Santa Clarita Blue Heat
- NWSL Shield: Portland Thorns FC
- NWSL Challenge Cup: Portland Thorns FC

The 2021 season was the 109th season of competitive soccer in the United States. A significant number of games scheduled for 2021 are matches postponed from 2020 due to the COVID-19 pandemic.

== National teams ==
=== Men's ===
==== Senior ====
As of December 18, 2021.

Wins	Losses	Draws
17	2	3

===== Friendlies =====
January 31	United States	7–0	Trinidad and Tobago	Orlando, Florida
19:00 ET	Lewis 2', 55'; Ferreira 9', 62'; Arriola 22', 41'; Robinson 52'	Report		Stadium: Exploria Stadium; Attendance: 3,503; Referee: Hector Said Martinez (Honduras)

March 25	United States	4–1	Jamaica	Wiener Neustadt, Austria
13:00 ET	Dest 34'; Aaronson 53'; Lletget 83', 90'	Report	Lowe 70'	Stadium: Wiener Neustadt Arena; Attendance: 0 (closed door); Referee: Christian-Petru Ciochirca (Austria)

March 28	Northern Ireland	1–2	United States	Belfast, Northern Ireland
12:00 ET	McGinn 88'	Report	Reyna 30'; Pulisic 59' (pen.)	Stadium: Windsor Park; Attendance: 0 (closed door); Referee: Robert Jenkins (Wales)

May 30	Switzerland	2–1	United States	St. Gallen, Switzerland
14:00 ET	Rodríguez 10'; Zuber 63'	Report	Lletget 5'	Stadium: Kybunpark; Attendance: 0 (closed door); Referee: Harm Osmers (Germany)

June 9	United States	4–0	Costa Rica	Sandy, Utah
19:00 ET	Aaronson 8'; Dike 42'; Cannon 52'; Reyna 77' (pen.)	Report		Stadium: Rio Tinto Stadium; Attendance: 19,007; Referee: Tristley Bassue (St. Kitts and Nevis)

December 18	United States	1–0	Bosnia and Herzegovina	Carson, California
	Bassett 89'	Report		Stadium: Dignity Health Sports Park; Attendance: 11,044; Referee: Keylor Herrera (Costa Rica)

===== 2021 CONCACAF Nations League Finals =====
The four teams were ranked based on their results in the group stage to determine the semi-final matchups.

Seed	Grp	Team	Pld	W	D	L	GF	GA	GD	Pts
1	B	Mexico	4	4	0	0	13	3	+10	12
2	C	Honduras	4	3	1	0	8	1	+7	10
3	A	United States (H)	4	3	0	1	15	3	+12	9
4	D	Costa Rica	4	1	3	0	4	3	+1	6

Source: CONCACAF
Rules for classification: 1) points; 2) goal difference; 3) goals scored; 4) away goals scored; 5) disciplinary points; 6) drawing of lots (Regulations Article 12.9).
(H) Hosts

Semi-finals
3 June – Denver
Honduras	0
United States	1
3 June – Denver
Mexico (p)	0 (5)
Costa Rica	0 (4)

Final
6 June – Denver
United States (a.e.t.)	3
Mexico	2
Third place play-off
6 June – Denver
Honduras (p)	2 (5)
Costa Rica	2 (4)

June 3 SF	Honduras	0–1	United States	Denver, Colorado
19:30 ET		Report	Siebatcheu 89'	Stadium: Empower Field at Mile High; Attendance: 34,451; Referee: Oshane Nation (Jamaica)

====== Final ======
6 June 2021
19:00 (Note: Though listed with a 19:00 kick-off time, the match actually began at 19:36.)

United States	3–2 (a.e.t.)	Mexico
Reyna 27'; McKennie 82'; Pulisic 114' (pen.)	Report	Corona 2'; Lainez 79'

Empower Field at Mile High, Denver
Attendance: 37,648
Referee: John Pitti (Panama)

===== 2021 CONCACAF Gold Cup =====
====== Group B ======
Pos	Team	Pld	W	D	L	GF	GA	GD	Pts	Qualification
1	United States (H)	3	3	0	0	8	1	+7	9	Advance to knockout stage
2	Canada	3	2	0	1	8	3	+5	6	Advance to knockout stage
3	Haiti	3	1	0	2	3	6	−3	3	
4	Martinique	3	0	0	3	3	12	−9	0	

Source: CONCACAF
(H) Hosts

July 11	United States	1–0	Haiti	Kansas City, Kansas
21:00 ET	Vines 8'	Report		Stadium: Children's Mercy Park; Attendance: 12,664; Referee: Hector Said Martinez (Honduras)

July 15	Martinique	1–6	United States	Kansas City, Kansas
22:00 ET	Rivière 64' (pen.)	Report	Dike 14', 59'; Camille 23' (o.g.); Robinson 50'; Zardes 70'; Gioacchini 90'	Stadium: Children's Mercy Park; Attendance: 7,511; Referee: Mario Escobar (Guatemala)

July 18	United States	1–0	Canada	Kansas City, Kansas
17:00 ET	Moore 1'	Report		Stadium: Children's Mercy Park; Attendance: 18,467; Referee: Adonai Escobedo (Mexico)

====== Knockout stage ======
July 25 QF	United States	1–0	Jamaica	Arlington, Texas
21:30 ET	Hoppe 83'	Report		Stadium: AT&T Stadium; Attendance: 41,318; Referee: César Ramos (Mexico)

July 29 SF	Qatar	0–1	United States	Austin, Texas
19:30 ET		Report	Zardes 87'	Stadium: Q2 Stadium; Attendance: 20,500; Referee: Juan Gabriel Calderón (Costa Rica)

====== Final ======
August 1, 2021
21:00 (18:00 UTC−7)

United States	1–0 (a.e.t.)	Mexico
Robinson 117'	Report

Allegiant Stadium, Paradise
Attendance: 61,114
Referee: Said Martínez (Honduras)

===== 2022 FIFA World Cup qualification =====
====== CONCACAF third round ======
Pos	Team	Pld	W	D	L	GF	GA	GD	Pts	Qualification	Canada	Mexico	United States	Costa Rica	Panama	Jamaica	El Salvador	Honduras
1	Canada	14	8	4	2	23	7	+16	28	2022 FIFA World Cup	—	2–1	2–0	1–0	4–1	4–0	3–0	1–1
2	Mexico	14	8	4	2	17	8	+9	28	2022 FIFA World Cup	1–1	—	0–0	0–0	1–0	2–1	2–0	3–0
3	United States	14	7	4	3	21	10	+11	25	2022 FIFA World Cup	1–1	2–0	—	2–1	5–1	2–0	1–0	3–0
4	Costa Rica	14	7	4	3	13	8	+5	25	Inter-confederation play-offs	1–0	0–1	2–0	—	1–0	1–1	2–1	2–1
5	Panama	14	6	3	5	17	19	−2	21		1–0	1–1	1–0	0–0	—	3–2	2–1	1–1
6	Jamaica	14	2	5	7	12	22	−10	11		0–0	1–2	1–1	0–1	0–3	—	1–1	2–1
7	El Salvador	14	2	4	8	8	18	−10	10		0–2	0–2	0–0	1–2	1–0	1–1	—	0–0
8	Honduras	14	0	4	10	7	26	−19	4		0–2	0–1	1–4	0–0	2–3	0–2	0–2	—

Source: FIFA, CONCACAF
Rules for classification: Tiebreakers

September 2	El Salvador	0–0	United States	San Salvador, El Salvador
22:00 ET		Report		Stadium: Estadio Cuscatlán; Attendance: 29,000; Referee: Juan Gabriel Calderon (Costa Rica)

September 5	United States	1–1	Canada	Nashville, Tennessee
20:00 ET	Aaronson 55'	Report	Larin 62'	Stadium: Nissan Stadium; Attendance: 43,028; Referee: Oshane Nation (Jamaica)

September 8	Honduras	1–4	United States	San Pedro Sula, Honduras
22:30 ET	Moya 27'	Report	Robinson 48'; Pepi 75'; Aaronson 86'; Lletget 90+3'	Stadium: Estadio Olímpico Metropolitano; Attendance: 31,000; Referee: Fernando Hernández Gómez (Mexico)

October 7	United States	2–0	Jamaica	Austin, Texas
19:30 ET	Pepi 49', 62'	Report		Stadium: Q2 Stadium; Attendance: 20,500; Referee: Reon Radix (Grenada)

October 10	Panama	1–0	United States	Panama City, Panama
17:00 ET	Godoy 54'	Report		Stadium: Estadio Rommel Fernández; Attendance: 21,000; Referee: César Arturo Ramos (Mexico)

October 13	United States	2–1	Costa Rica	Columbus, Ohio
19:00 ET	Dest 25'; Moreira 66' (o.g.)	Report	Fuller 1'	Stadium: Lower.com Field; Attendance: 20,165; Referee: Daneon Parchment (Jamaica)

November 12	United States	2–0	Mexico	Cincinnati, Ohio
21:10 ET	Pulisic 74'; McKennie 85'	Report		Stadium: TQL Stadium; Attendance: 26,000; Referee: Iván Barton (El Salvador)

November 16	Jamaica	1–1	United States	Kingston, Jamaica
17:00 ET	Antonio 22'	Report	Weah 11'	Stadium: Independence Park; Attendance: 4,100; Referee: Juan Gabriel Calderon (Costa Rica)

===== Goalscorers =====
Goals are current as of December 18, 2021, after the match against Bosnia and Herzegovina.

Player	Goals
Brenden Aaronson	4
Sebastian Lletget	4
Daryl Dike	3
Ricardo Pepi	3
Christian Pulisic	3
Giovanni Reyna	3
Miles Robinson	3
Paul Arriola	2
Sergiño Dest	2
Jesús Ferreira	2
Jonathan Lewis	2
Weston McKennie	2
Gyasi Zardes	2
Cole Bassett	1
Reggie Cannon	1
Nicholas Gioacchini	1
Matthew Hoppe	1
Shaq Moore	1
Antonee Robinson	1
Jordan Siebatcheu	1
Sam Vines	1
Timothy Weah	1
own goal	2

==== U–23 ====
===== CONCACAF Men's Olympic Qualifying Championship =====
The draw for the tournament took place on 9 January 2020, 19:00 CST (UTC−6), at the Estadio Akron, in Guadalajara, Mexico. On March 13, 2020 CONCACAF suspended all upcoming Concacaf competitions scheduled to take place over the next 30 days.

On 14 January 2021, CONCACAF announced that the Men's Olympic Qualifying will take place between 18 March and 30 March.

====== Group A ======
Pos	Team	Pld	W	D	L	GF	GA	GD	Pts	Qualification
1	Mexico (H)	3	3	0	0	8	1	+7	9	Advance to knockout stage
2	United States	3	2	0	1	5	1	+4	6	Advance to knockout stage
3	Costa Rica	3	1	0	2	5	4	+1	3	
4	Dominican Republic	3	0	0	3	1	13	−12	0	

Source: CONCACAF
(H) Hosts

March 18 Group A	United States	1–0	Costa Rica	Guadalajara, Mexico
17:30 ET	Ferreira 35'	Report		Stadium: Estadio Jalisco; Referee: Said Martínez (Honduras)

March 21 Group A	Dominican Republic	0–4	United States	Zapopan, Mexico
19:00 ET		Report	Yueill 60'; Dotson 73', 78'; Mihailovic 90'	Stadium: Estadio Akron; Referee: Daneon Parchment (Jamaica)

March 24 Group A	Mexico	1–0	United States	Guadalajara, Mexico
21:30 ET	Antuna 45'	Report		Stadium: Estadio Jalisco; Referee: Daneon Parchment (Jamaica)

March 28 SF	Honduras	2–1	United States	Guadalajara, Mexico
17:00 ET	Obregón 45+4'; Palma 47'	Report	Yueill 52'	Stadium: Estadio Jalisco; Referee: Iván Barton (El Salvador)

==== U–20 ====
===== CONCACAF U-20 Championship =====
The tournament was originally scheduled to be held in Honduras between 20 June and 5 July 2020. However, on 13 May 2020, CONCACAF announced the decision to postpone the tournament due to the COVID-19 pandemic, with the new dates of the tournament to be confirmed later. CONCACAF decided on 4 January 2021 that the 2020 CONCACAF U-20 Championship, which served as the regional qualifiers, would be cancelled.

=== Women's ===
==== Senior ====
As of November 30, 2021.

Wins	Losses	Draws
17	2	5

===== Friendlies =====
January 18	United States	4–0	Colombia	Orlando, Florida
19:00 ET	S. Mewis 4', 33', 46' (pen.); K. Mewis 85'	Report		Stadium: Exploria Stadium; Attendance: 2,042; Referee: Karen Abt (United States)

January 22	United States	6–0	Colombia	Orlando, Florida
19:00 ET	Macario 3'; Rapinoe 35', 44' (pen.); Williams 60'; Horan 73'; Purce 86'	Report		Stadium: Exploria Stadium; Attendance: 3,202; Referee: Danielle Chesky (United States)

April 10	Sweden	1–1	United States	Stockholm, Sweden
13:00 ET	Hurtig 38'	Report	Rapinoe 87' (pen.)	Stadium: Friends Arena; Referee: Lina Lehtovaara (Finland)

April 13	France	0–2	United States	Le Havre, France
15:00 ET		Report	Rapinoe 5' (pen.); Morgan 19'	Stadium: Stade Océane; Referee: Riem Hussein (Germany)

June 10	United States	1–0	Portugal	Houston, Texas
20:30 ET	S. Mewis 76'	Report		Stadium: BBVA Stadium; Attendance: 9,951; Referee: Danielle Chesky (United States)

June 13	United States	4–0	Jamaica	Houston, Texas
22:00 ET	Lloyd 1'; Horan 7' (pen.); Purce 22'; Morgan 90+1'	Report		Stadium: BBVA Stadium; Attendance: 8,737; Referee: Karen Abt (United States)

June 16	United States	2–0	Nigeria	Austin, Texas
21:00 ET	Press 45+2'; Williams 90+4'	Report		Stadium: Q2 Stadium; Attendance: 20,500; Referee: Katja Koroleva (United States)

July 1	United States	4–0	Mexico	East Hartford, Connecticut
19:00 ET	S. Mewis 21'; Press 39', 85'; Heath 74'	Report		Stadium: Pratt & Whitney Stadium; Attendance: 21,637; Referee: Katja Koroleva (United States)

July 5	United States	4–0	Mexico	East Hartford, Connecticut
17:00 ET	Horan 6'; Lloyd 11'; Reyes 37' (o.g.); Heath 39'	Report		Stadium: Pratt & Whitney Stadium; Attendance: 27,758; Referee: Danielle Chesky (United States)

September 16	United States	9–0	Paraguay	Cleveland, Ohio
19:30 ET	Lloyd 3', 6', 34', 38', 61'; Sullivan 25', 49'; Williams 30'; Heath 86'	Report		Stadium: FirstEnergy Stadium; Attendance: 14,117; Referee: Karen Abt (United States)

September 21	United States	8–0	Paraguay	Cincinnati, Ohio
19:30 ET	Lavelle 4'; Smith 6'; Morgan 8', 14', 53'; Macario 15', 82'; Lloyd 78'	Report		Stadium: TQL Stadium; Attendance: 22,515; Referee: Danielle Chesky (United States)

October 21	United States	0–0	South Korea	Kansas City, Kansas
20:00 ET		Report		Stadium: Children's Mercy Park; Attendance: 18,467; Referee: Katja Koroleva (United States)

October 26	United States	6–0	South Korea	St. Paul, Minnesota
20:00 ET	Horan 9'; Cho So-hyun 45' (o.g.); Morgan 69'; Rapinoe 85'; Lavelle 89'; Williams 90+2'	Report		Stadium: Allianz Field; Attendance: 18,115; Referee: Karen Abt (United States)

November 26	Australia	0–3	United States	Sydney, Australia
23:00 ET		Report	Hatch 1'; Lavelle 49'; Horan 68' (pen.)	Stadium: Stadium Australia; Attendance: 36,109; Referee: Hyeon Jeong Oh (South Korea)

November 30	Australia	1–1	United States	Newcastle, Australia
04:05 ET	Simon 88'	Report	Hatch 4'	Stadium: McDonald Jones Stadium; Attendance: 20,495; Referee: Seijin Park (South Korea)

===== SheBelieves Cup =====
Pos	Team	Pld	W	D	L	GF	GA	GD	Pts
1st place, gold medalist(s)	United States (C, H)	3	3	0	0	9	0	+9	9
2nd place, silver medalist(s)	Brazil	3	2	0	1	6	3	+3	6
3rd place, bronze medalist(s)	Canada	3	1	0	2	1	3	−2	3
4	Argentina	3	0	0	3	1	11	−10	0

Source: US Soccer
Rules for classification: 1) points; 2) goal difference; 3) goals scored; 4) head-to-head result; 5) Fair Play ranking.
(C) Champions; (H) Hosts

February 18	United States	1–0	Canada	Orlando, Florida
19:00 ET	Lavelle 79'	Report		Stadium: Exploria Stadium; Attendance: 3,104; Referee: Francia González (Mexico)

February 21	United States	2–0	Brazil	Orlando, Florida
15:00 ET	Press 11'; Rapinoe 88'	Report		Stadium: Exploria Stadium; Attendance: 4,000; Referee: Melissa Borjas (Honduras)

February 24	United States	6–0	Argentina	Orlando, Florida
19:00 ET	Rapinoe 16', 26'; Lloyd 35'; K. Mewis 41'; Morgan 84'; Press 88'	Report		Stadium: Exploria Stadium; Attendance: 3,702; Referee: Marianela Araya Cruz (Costa Rica)

===== Summer Olympics =====
Due to the COVID-19 pandemic, the games have been postponed to the summer of 2021. However, their official name remains 2020 Summer Olympics with the rescheduled 2021 dates have yet to be announced.

====== Group G ======
Pos	Team	Pld	W	D	L	GF	GA	GD	Pts	Qualification
1	Sweden	3	3	0	0	9	2	+7	9	Advance to knockout stage
2	United States	3	1	1	1	6	4	+2	4	Advance to knockout stage
3	Australia	3	1	1	1	4	5	−1	4	Advance to knockout stage
4	New Zealand	3	0	0	3	2	10	−8	0	

Source: TOCOG and FIFA
Rules for classification: Group stage tiebreakers

July 21 Olympics GS	Sweden	3–0	United States	Tokyo, Japan
04:30 ET	Blackstenius 25', 54'; Hurtig 72'	Report		Stadium: Tokyo Stadium; Attendance: 0 Referee: Yoshimi Yamashita (Japan)

July 24 Olympics GS	New Zealand	1–6	United States	Saitama, Japan
07:00 ET	Hassett 72'	Report	Lavelle 9'; Horan 45'; Erceg 63' (o.g.); Press 80'; Morgan 87'; Bott 90+3' (o.g.)	Stadium: Saitama Stadium 2002; Attendance: 0 Referee: Stéphanie Frappart (France)

July 27 Olympics GS	United States	0–0	Australia	Kashima, Japan
04:00 ET		Report		Stadium: Kashima Stadium; Referee: Anastasia Pustovoitova (Russia)

====== Knockout stage ======
July 30 QF	Netherlands	2–2 (a.e.t.) (2–4 p)	United States	Yokohama, Japan
07:00 ET	Miedema 18', 54'	Report	S. Mewis 28'; Williams 31'	Stadium: International Stadium Yokohama; Referee: Kate Jacewicz (Australia)
	Penalties
	Miedema (penalty missed); Janssen (penalty scored); Van der Gragt (penalty scored); Nouwen (penalty missed)		(penalty scored) Lavelle; (penalty scored) Morgan; (penalty scored) Press; (penalty scored) Rapinoe

August 2 Olympics SF	United States	0–1	Canada	Kashima, Japan
04:00 ET		Report	Fleming 75' (pen.)	Stadium: Kashima Stadium; Referee: Kateryna Monzul (Ukraine)

August 5 Olympics 3rd	Australia	3–4	United States	Kashima, Japan
	Kerr 17'; Foord 54'; Gielnik 90'	Report	Rapinoe 8', 21'; Lloyd 45+1', 51'	Stadium: Kashima Stadium; Referee: Laura Fortunato (Argentina)

===== Goalscorers =====
Goals are current as of November 30, 2021, after the match against Australia.

Player	Goals
Carli Lloyd	11
Megan Rapinoe	10
Alex Morgan	8
Lindsey Horan	6
Sam Mewis	6
Christen Press	6
Rose Lavelle	5
Lynn Williams	5
Tobin Heath	3
Catarina Macario	3
Ashley Hatch	2
Kristie Mewis	2
Margaret Purce	2
Andi Sullivan	2
Sophia Smith	1
own goal	4
Total	76

==== U-20 ====
===== FIFA U-20 Women's World Cup =====
The tournament was originally scheduled to be held in August/September 2020. However, due to the COVID-19 pandemic, FIFA announced on 3 April 2020 that the tournament would be postponed and rescheduled. On 12 May 2020, FIFA announced that the tournament will be held between 20 January–6 February 2021, subject to further monitoring. On November 17, 2020 tournament was moved to 2022.

== Club competitions ==
=== Men's ===
==== League competitions ====
===== Major League Soccer =====
====== Conference tables ======
Eastern Conference

Pos	Team	Pld	W	L	T	GF	GA	GD	Pts	Qualification
1	New England Revolution	34	22	5	7	65	41	+24	73	Qualification for the playoffs conference semifinals and CONCACAF Champions League
2	Philadelphia Union	34	14	8	12	48	35	+13	54	Qualification for the playoffs first round
3	Nashville SC	34	12	4	18	55	33	+22	54	Qualification for the playoffs first round
4	New York City FC (C)	34	14	11	9	56	36	+20	51	Qualification for the playoffs first round and CONCACAF Champions League (Note: As MLS Cup 2021 champions)
5	Atlanta United FC	34	13	9	12	45	37	+8	51	Qualification for the playoffs first round
6	Orlando City SC	34	13	9	12	50	48	+2	51	Qualification for the playoffs first round
7	New York Red Bulls	34	13	12	9	39	33	+6	48	Qualification for the playoffs first round
8	D.C. United	34	14	15	5	56	54	+2	47	
9	Columbus Crew	34	13	13	8	46	45	+1	47	
10	CF Montréal (Note: Canadian clubs cannot qualify for the 2022 CONCACAF Champions League through the MLS regular season or playoffs.)	34	12	12	10	46	44	+2	46	Qualification for the CONCACAF Champions League (Note: As 2021 Canadian Championship winners)
11	Inter Miami CF	34	12	17	5	36	53	−17	41	
12	Chicago Fire FC	34	9	18	7	36	54	−18	34	
13	Toronto FC	34	6	18	10	39	66	−27	28	
14	FC Cincinnati	34	4	22	8	37	74	−37	20	

Source: MLS
Rules for classification: 1) points; 2) total wins; 3) total goal differential; 4) total goals scored; 5) fewer disciplinary points; 6) away goal differential; 7) away goals scored; 8) home goals differential; 9) home goals scored; 10) coin toss (2 clubs tied) or drawing of lots (≥3 clubs tied)
(C) Champions
Notes:

Western Conference

Pos	Team	Pld	W	L	T	GF	GA	GD	Pts	Qualification
1	Colorado Rapids	34	17	7	10	51	35	+16	61	Qualification for the Playoffs Conference semifinals and CONCACAF Champions League
2	Seattle Sounders FC	34	17	8	9	53	33	+20	60	Qualification for the Playoffs first round and CONCACAF Champions League
3	Sporting Kansas City	34	17	10	7	58	40	+18	58	Qualification for the Playoffs first round
4	Portland Timbers	34	17	13	4	56	52	+4	55	Qualification for the Playoffs first round
5	Minnesota United FC	34	13	11	10	42	44	−2	49	Qualification for the Playoffs first round
6	Vancouver Whitecaps FC (Note: Canadian clubs cannot qualify for the 2022 CONCACAF Champions League through the MLS regular season or playoffs.)	34	12	9	13	45	45	0	49	Qualification for the Playoffs first round
7	Real Salt Lake	34	14	14	6	55	54	+1	48	Qualification for the Playoffs first round
8	LA Galaxy	34	13	12	9	50	54	−4	48	
9	Los Angeles FC	34	12	13	9	53	51	+2	45	
10	San Jose Earthquakes	34	10	13	11	46	54	−8	41	
11	FC Dallas	34	7	15	12	47	56	−9	33	
12	Austin FC	34	9	21	4	35	56	−21	31	
13	Houston Dynamo FC	34	6	16	12	36	54	−18	30	

Source: MLS
Rules for classification: 1) points; 2) total wins; 3) total goal differential; 4) total goals scored; 5) fewer disciplinary points; 6) away goal differential; 7) away goals scored; 8) home goals differential; 9) home goals scored; 10) coin toss (2 clubs tied) or drawing of lots (≥3 clubs tied)

====== Overall 2021 table ======
Note: the table below has no impact on playoff qualification and is used solely for determining host of the MLS Cup, certain CCL spots, the Supporters' Shield trophy, seeding in the 2021 Canadian Championship, and 2022 MLS draft. The conference tables are the sole determinant for teams qualifying for the playoffs.

Pos	Team	Pld	W	L	T	GF	GA	GD	Pts	Qualification
1	New England Revolution (S)	34	22	5	7	65	41	+24	73	Qualification for the 2022 CONCACAF Champions League (Note: As Supporters' Shield winners (USA2))
2	Colorado Rapids	34	17	7	10	51	35	+16	61	Qualification for the 2022 CONCACAF Champions League (Note: As 2021 MLS Western Conference regular season champions (USA3))
3	Seattle Sounders FC	34	17	8	9	53	33	+20	60	Qualification for the 2022 CONCACAF Champions League (Note: As highest-ranked U.S. based Division I club (based on 2021 MLS regular season record) not already qualified (USA4))
4	Sporting Kansas City	34	17	10	7	58	40	+18	58	
5	Portland Timbers	34	17	13	4	56	52	+4	55	
6	Philadelphia Union	34	14	8	12	48	35	+13	54	
7	Nashville SC	34	12	4	18	55	33	+22	54	
8	New York City FC (C)	34	14	11	9	56	36	+20	51	Qualification for the 2022 CONCACAF Champions League (Note: As MLS Cup 2021 champions (USA1))
9	Atlanta United FC	34	13	9	12	45	37	+8	51	
10	Orlando City SC	34	13	9	12	50	48	+2	51	
11	Minnesota United FC	34	13	11	10	42	44	−2	49	
12	Vancouver Whitecaps FC	34	12	9	13	45	45	0	49	
13	Real Salt Lake	34	14	14	6	55	54	+1	48	
14	New York Red Bulls	34	13	12	9	39	33	+6	48	
15	LA Galaxy	34	13	12	9	50	54	−4	48	
16	D.C. United	34	14	15	5	56	54	+2	47	
17	Columbus Crew	34	13	13	8	46	45	+1	47	
18	CF Montréal (V)	34	12	12	10	46	44	+2	46	Qualification for the 2022 CONCACAF Champions League (Note: As 2021 Canadian Championship winners (CAN1))
19	Los Angeles FC	34	12	13	9	53	51	+2	45	
20	Inter Miami CF	34	12	17	5	36	53	−17	41	
21	San Jose Earthquakes	34	10	13	11	46	54	−8	41	
22	Chicago Fire FC	34	9	18	7	36	54	−18	34	
23	FC Dallas	34	7	15	12	47	56	−9	33	
24	Austin FC	34	9	21	4	35	56	−21	31	
25	Houston Dynamo FC	34	6	16	12	36	54	−18	30	
26	Toronto FC	34	6	18	10	39	66	−27	28	
27	FC Cincinnati	34	4	22	8	37	74	−37	20	

Source: MLS
Rules for classification: 1) points; 2) total wins; 3) total goal differential; 4) total goals scored; 5) fewer disciplinary points; 6) away goal differential; 7) away goals scored; 8) home goals differential; 9) home goals scored; 10) coin toss (2 clubs tied) or drawing of lots (≥3 clubs tied)
(C) Champions; (S) Supporters' Shield winners; (V) Canadian Championship winner

====== MLS Playoffs ======
First round November 20–21, 23	Conference semifinals November 25, 28, 30
E1	New England Revolution	2 (3)
**E4**	**New York City FC (p)**	**2 (5)**
**E4**	**New York City FC**	**2**
E5	Atlanta United FC	0
**Eastern Conference**
E3	**Nashville SC**	**3**
E6	Orlando City SC	1
E3	Nashville SC	1 (0)
**E2**	**Philadelphia Union (p)**	**1 (2)**
**E2**	**Philadelphia Union (a.e.t.)**	**1**
E7	New York Red Bulls	0
W1	Colorado Rapids	0
**W4**	**Portland Timbers**	**1**
**W4**	**Portland Timbers**	**3**
W5	Minnesota United FC	1
**Western Conference**
**W3**	**Sporting Kansas City**	**3**
W6	Vancouver Whitecaps FC	1
W3	Sporting Kansas City	1
**W7**	**Real Salt Lake**	**2**
W2	Seattle Sounders FC	0 (5)
**W7**	**Real Salt Lake (p)**	**0 (6)**

Conference finals December 4–5
**E4**	**New York City FC**	**2**
E2	Philadelphia Union	1
**W4**	**Portland Timbers**	**2**
W7	Real Salt Lake	0

MLS Cup; December 11
**E4**	**New York City FC (p)**	**1 (4)**
W4	Portland Timbers	1 (2)

Note: The higher seeded teams hosted matches, with the MLS Cup host determined by overall points.

====== MLS Cup ======
December 11, 2021
12:00 p.m. PST

Portland Timbers	1–1 (a.e.t.)	New York City FC
Mora 90+4'	Report	Castellanos 41'
Penalties
Mora (penalty missed); Valeri (penalty missed); Moreno (penalty scored); Paredes (penalty scored)	2–4	(penalty scored) Castellanos; (penalty missed) Morales; (penalty scored) Moralez; (penalty scored) Talles Magno; (penalty scored) Callens

Providence Park, Portland, Oregon, U.S.
Attendance: 25,218
Referee: Armando Villarreal

====== MLS All-Star Game ======
2021 MLS All-Star Game
August 25, 2021
9:30 ET

MLS All-Stars (United States) (Canada)	1–1	(Mexico) Liga MX All-Stars
Murillo 53'	Report	Rodríguez 20'
Penalties
Kreilach (penalty scored); Sallói (penalty scored); Atuesta (penalty missed); Nani (penalty missed); Pepi (penalty scored)	3–2	(penalty scored) Sambueza; (penalty missed) Funes Mori; (penalty missed) Lira; (penalty missed) Reyes; (penalty scored) Romo

Banc of California Stadium, Los Angeles, California
Attendance: 21,000
Referee: Armando Villarreal

===== USL Championship =====
Renamed from United Soccer League (USL) after the 2018 season

====== Conference tables ======
Eastern Conference

Pos	Div	Team	Pld	W	D	L	GF	GA	GD	Pts	Qualification
1	AT	Tampa Bay Rowdies	32	23	2	7	55	23	+32	71	Playoffs
2	CT	Louisville City FC	32	18	7	7	61	37	+24	61	Playoffs
3	CT	Birmingham Legion FC	32	18	6	8	51	31	+20	60	Playoffs
4	AT	Charlotte Independence	32	18	5	9	57	36	+21	59	Playoffs
5	AT	Pittsburgh Riverhounds SC	32	17	7	8	52	34	+18	58	Playoffs
6	AT	Miami FC	32	16	6	10	55	40	+15	54	Playoffs
7	CT	Memphis 901 FC	32	14	8	10	47	42	+5	50	Playoffs
8	CT	FC Tulsa	32	14	5	13	49	48	+1	47	Playoffs
9	AT	Hartford Athletic	32	12	5	15	50	50	0	41	
10	AT	Charleston Battery	32	10	7	15	49	60	−11	37	
11	CT	OKC Energy FC	32	8	13	11	30	38	−8	37	
12	CT	Indy Eleven	32	9	8	15	32	47	−15	35	
13	CT	Atlanta United 2	32	8	10	14	47	56	−9	34	
14	AT	New York Red Bulls II	32	7	7	18	42	67	−25	28	
15	CT	Sporting Kansas City II	32	4	8	20	33	64	−31	20	
16	AT	Loudoun United FC	32	4	3	25	31	78	−47	15	

Source: USL Championship
Rules for classification: 1) points; 2) head-to-head points; 3) head-to-head goal differential; 4) total points earned against in-division opponents; 5) total regular season wins against in-division opponents; 6) total goal differential against in-division opponents; 7) total goals scored against in-division opponents; 8) disciplinary points; 9) coin toss or drawing of lots.

Western Conference

Pos	Div	Team	Pld	W	D	L	GF	GA	GD	Pts	Qualification
1	PC	Phoenix Rising FC	32	20	7	5	68	35	+33	67	Playoffs
2	MT	El Paso Locomotive FC	32	18	10	4	56	34	+22	64	Playoffs
3	PC	Orange County SC	32	15	7	10	44	37	+7	52	Playoffs
4	MT	San Antonio FC	32	14	10	8	50	38	+12	52	Playoffs
5	MT	Colorado Springs Switchbacks FC	32	13	10	9	60	50	+10	49	Playoffs
6	PC	San Diego Loyal SC	32	14	6	12	51	43	+8	48	Playoffs
7	MT	Rio Grande Valley FC Toros	32	13	8	11	49	42	+7	47	Playoffs
8	MT	New Mexico United	32	12	10	10	44	40	+4	46	
9	MT	Austin Bold FC	32	10	12	10	32	42	−10	42	
10	PC	Oakland Roots SC	32	11	8	13	36	43	−7	41	Playoffs
11	PC	LA Galaxy II	32	11	6	15	55	57	−2	39	
12	PC	Tacoma Defiance	32	10	9	13	37	41	−4	39	
13	PC	Sacramento Republic FC	32	8	12	12	36	42	−6	36	
14	MT	Real Monarchs	32	5	7	20	28	56	−28	22	
15	PC	Las Vegas Lights FC	32	6	3	23	41	77	−36	21	

Source: USL Championship
Rules for classification: 1) points; 2) head-to-head points; 3) head-to-head goal differential; 4) total points earned against in-division opponents; 5) total regular season wins against in-division opponents; 6) total goal differential against in-division opponents; 7) total goals scored against in-division opponents; 8) disciplinary points; 9) coin toss or drawing of lots.

===== USL League One =====
Pos	Team	Pld	W	D	L	GF	GA	GD	Pts	Qualification
1	Union Omaha (C, X)	28	14	9	5	44	22	+22	51	Qualification for the semi-finals
2	Greenville Triumph SC	28	12	9	7	36	29	+7	45	Qualification for the semi-finals
3	Chattanooga Red Wolves SC	28	11	11	6	37	29	+8	44	Qualification for the play-offs
4	FC Tucson	28	11	7	10	44	42	+2	40	Qualification for the play-offs
5	Richmond Kickers	28	11	7	10	35	36	−1	40	Qualification for the play-offs
6	North Texas SC	28	10	10	8	40	32	+8	40	Qualification for the play-offs
7	Toronto FC II	28	10	8	10	34	32	+2	38	
8	New England Revolution II	28	11	4	13	33	39	−6	37	
9	Forward Madison FC	28	8	12	8	32	34	−2	36	
10	Fort Lauderdale CF	28	8	7	13	40	49	−9	31	
11	Tormenta FC	28	8	6	14	36	47	−11	30	
12	North Carolina FC	28	7	4	17	30	50	−20	25	

Source: USL League One
Rules for classification: 1) points; 2) total wins; 3) total goal differential; 4) total goals scored; 5) points earned against top four Conference finishers; 6) disciplinary points; 7) drawing of lots.
(C) Champions; (X) Regular Season Champion

===== National Independent Soccer Association =====
====== Spring 2021 ======
Legends Cup

Pos	Team	Pld	W	D	L	GF	GA	GD	Pts	Qualification
1	Chattanooga FC	2	2	0	0	7	1	+6	6	Advance to Legends Cup final
2	Detroit City FC	2	1	1	0	2	0	+2	4	Advance to Legends Cup semifinal
3	San Diego 1904 FC	2	1	1	0	3	2	+1	4	Advance to Legends Cup semifinal
4	Los Angeles Force	2	1	0	1	4	6	−2	3	
5	Michigan Stars FC	2	0	2	0	2	2	0	2	
6	California United Strikers FC	2	0	2	0	1	1	0	2	
7	Maryland Bobcats FC	2	0	1	1	2	3	−1	1	
8	Stumptown AC	2	0	1	1	1	3	−2	1	
9	New Amsterdam FC	2	0	0	2	2	6	−4	0	

Source: nisasoccer.com
Rules for classification: 1) points; 2) goal differential; 3) goals scored; 4) head to head; 5) goals allowed; 6) coin toss

Semifinals; April 22, 2021			Finals; April 25, 2021
			1	Chattanooga FC	0
2	**Detroit City FC**	**1**	2	**Detroit City FC**	**3**
3	San Diego 1904 FC	0

Bold = winner
* = after extra time, ( ) = penalty shootout score

Conference table

Pos	Team	Pld	W	D	L	GF	GA	GD	Pts	Qualification
1	Detroit City FC (Y, X)	8	6	2	0	14	3	+11	20	Advance to season final
2	Los Angeles Force	8	6	0	2	11	6	+5	18	Advance to spring final (Note: If either 2020 Fall Champion Detroit or 2021 Legends Cup runner-up Chattanooga finish the spring season in first place, or both teams finish in the top two, the spot in the spring final will go to the next best team.)
3	Stumptown AC	8	4	3	1	8	4	+4	15	
4	California United Strikers FC	8	4	1	3	12	10	+2	13	
5	Maryland Bobcats FC	8	3	2	3	9	8	+1	11	
6	Chattanooga FC (Z)	8	2	2	4	6	8	−2	8	Advance to spring final
7	San Diego 1904 FC	8	2	1	5	8	17	−9	7	
8	Michigan Stars FC	8	1	2	5	5	12	−7	5	
9	New Amsterdam FC	8	1	1	6	5	10	−5	4	

Source: nisasoccer.com
Rules for classification: 1) points; 2) goal differential; 3) goals scored; 4) head to head; 5) goals allowed; 6) coin toss
(X) Spring Legends Cup champion; (Y) Fall Champion, qualifies for season final; (Z) Spring Legends Cup runner-up, qualifies for spring final
Notes:

Playoffs

Semifinal; June 30, 2021			Finals; July 3, 2021
			FC	**Detroit City FC**	**1**
LC	Chattanooga FC	2	SS	Los Angeles Force	0
SS	**Los Angeles Force**	**3**

Bold = winner
* = after extra time, ( ) = penalty shootout score
Source: Spring Season | National Independent Soccer Association

2020–21 NISA Championship

July 3, 2021
19:30 EDT

Detroit City FC	1–0	Los Angeles Force
McLaughlin 62' (o.g.); Botello Faz (yellow card) 73'	Report; Broadcast	Gordillo (yellow card) 30'; Moran (Ast. Coach) (yellow card) 69' (yellow-red card) 90+6'; Villatoro (yellow card) 70'; Pérez (yellow card) 74'; Barrera (yellow card) 79'; Goñi (yellow card) 84'; Chaney (yellow card) 90+2'

Keyworth Stadium, Hamtramck, Michigan
Attendance: 7,231
Referee: Gustavo Solorio

====== Fall 2021 ======
Pos	Team	Pld	W	D	L	GF	GA	GD	Pts
1	Detroit City FC (C)	18	14	3	1	35	10	+25	45 (Note: The November 13 match between the LA Force and Detroit City FC was cancelled due to several players testing positive for COVID-19. The match was declared a 0-0 draw.)
2	California United Strikers FC	18	9	6	3	31	20	+11	33
3	Los Angeles Force	18	7	9	2	20	14	+6	30
4	New Amsterdam FC	18	7	2	9	29	29	0	23
5	Chattanooga FC	18	7	2	9	20	21	−1	23
6	Chicago House AC	18	7	2	9	18	26	−8	23
7	Michigan Stars FC	18	5	6	7	24	24	0	21
8	Stumptown AC	18	4	8	6	13	18	−5	20
9	Maryland Bobcats FC	18	5	5	8	20	28	−8	20
10	San Diego 1904 FC	18	2	3	13	17	37	−20	9

Source: nisasoccer.com
Rules for classification: 1) points; 2) goal differential; 3) goals scored; 4) head-to-head
(C) Champions

==== Cup competitions ====
===== US Open Cup =====
On July 20, US Soccer finally announced that the tournament would be cancelled for 2021 and would resume in 2022.

==== International competitions ====
===== CONCACAF competitions =====
====== CONCACAF Champions League ======
Club	Competition	Final round
Columbus Crew SC	2021 CONCACAF Champions League	Quarter-finals
Philadelphia Union	2021 CONCACAF Champions League	Semi-finals
Portland Timbers	2021 CONCACAF Champions League	Quarter-finals
Atlanta United FC	2021 CONCACAF Champions League	Quarter-finals

teams in bold are still active in the competition

Round of 16

Team 1	Agg.	Team 2	1st leg	2nd leg
Real Estelí (Nicaragua)	0–5	(United States) **Columbus Crew SC**	0–4	0–1
Saprissa (Costa Rica)	0–5	(United States) **Philadelphia Union**	0–1	0–4
Alajuelense (Costa Rica)	0–2	(United States) **Atlanta United FC**	0–1	0–1
Marathón (Honduras)	2–7	(United States) **Portland Timbers**	2–2	0–5

Quarter-finals

Team 1	Agg.	Team 2	1st leg	2nd leg
Columbus Crew SC (United States)	2–5	(Mexico) **Monterrey**	2–2	0–3
Atlanta United FC (United States)	1–4	(United States) **Philadelphia Union**	0–3	1–1
Portland Timbers (United States)	2–4	(Mexico) **América**	1–1	1–3

Semi-finals

Team 1	Agg.	Team 2	1st leg	2nd leg
**América** (Mexico)	4–0	(United States) Philadelphia Union	2–0	2–0

====== Leagues Cup ======
Club	Competition	Final round
Sporting Kansas City	2021 Leagues Cup	Quarter-finals
Orlando City SC	2021 Leagues Cup	Quarter-finals
Seattle Sounders FC	2021 Leagues Cup	Runners-up
New York City FC	2021 Leagues Cup	Quarter-finals

teams in bold are still active in the competition.

Quarter-finals

Team 1	Score	Team 2
Orlando City SC (United States)	0–1	(Mexico) **Santos Laguna**
New York City FC (United States)	1–1 (p 2–3)	(Mexico) **UNAM**
**Seattle Sounders FC** (United States)	3–0	(Mexico) UANL
Sporting Kansas City (United States)	1–6	(Mexico) **León**

Semi-finals

Team 1	Score	Team 2
**Seattle Sounders FC** (United States)	1–0	(Mexico) Santos Laguna

Final

Team 1	Score	Team 2
Seattle Sounders FC (United States)	2–3	(Mexico) **León**

====== Campeones Cup ======
September 29, 2021
20:00 EDT (UTC−04:00)

Columbus Crew (United States)	2–0	(Mexico) Cruz Azul
Angulo 4' (o.g.); Mensah 74'	Report

Lower.com Field, Columbus, Ohio
Attendance: 18,026
Referee: Oshane Nation (Jamaica)

=== Women's ===
==== League competitions ====
===== National Women's Soccer League =====
====== Regular season ======
Pos	Team	Pld	W	D	L	GF	GA	GD	Pts	Qualification
1	Portland Thorns FC	24	13	5	6	33	17	+16	44	NWSL Shield
2	OL Reign	24	13	3	8	37	24	+13	42	Playoffs – Semi-finals
3	Washington Spirit (C)	24	11	6	7	29	26	+3	39	Playoffs – First round
4	Chicago Red Stars	24	11	5	8	28	28	0	38	Playoffs – First round
5	NJ/NY Gotham FC	24	8	11	5	29	21	+8	35	Playoffs – First round
6	North Carolina Courage	24	9	6	9	28	23	+5	33	Playoffs – First round
7	Houston Dash	24	9	5	10	31	31	0	32	
8	Orlando Pride	24	7	7	10	27	32	−5	28	
9	Racing Louisville FC	24	5	7	12	21	40	−19	22	
10	Kansas City	24	3	7	14	15	36	−21	16	

Source: NWSL
Rules for classification: Tiebreakers
(C) Champions

====== Playoffs ======
**First round**
**4**	**Chicago Red Stars**	**1**
5	NJ/NY Gotham FC	0
**3**	**Washington Spirit (a.e.t.)**	**1**
6	North Carolina Courage	0

**Semi-finals**
1	Portland Thorns FC	0
**4**	**Chicago Red Stars**	**2**
2	OL Reign	1
**3**	**Washington Spirit**	**2**

**Championship**
4	Chicago Red Stars	1
**3**	**Washington Spirit (a.e.t.)**	**2**

Championship

November 20, 2021
12:00 ET

Washington Spirit	2–1 (a.e.t.)	Chicago Red Stars
Sullivan 87' (pen.); O'Hara 90+7'	Report	Hill 45+5'

Lynn Family Stadium, Louisville, Kentucky
Attendance: 10,360
Referee: Tori Penso

==== Cup competitions ====
===== NWSL Challenge Cup =====
====== Standings ======
East

Pos	Team	Pld	W	D	L	GF	GA	GD	Pts	Qualification
1	NJ/NY Gotham FC	4	2	2	0	5	3	+2	**8**	Qualification for the Championship
2	North Carolina Courage	4	2	1	1	9	8	+1	**7**	
3	Orlando Pride	4	1	2	1	3	3	0	**5**	
4	Washington Spirit	4	1	1	2	3	4	−1	**4**	
5	Racing Louisville FC	4	0	2	2	4	6	−2	**2**	

Source: NWSL
Rules for classification: Tiebreakers

West

Pos	Team	Pld	W	D	L	GF	GA	GD	Pts	Qualification
1	Portland Thorns FC	4	3	1	0	6	2	+4	**10**	Qualification for the Championship
2	OL Reign	4	2	1	1	5	5	0	**7**	
3	Houston Dash	4	1	3	0	4	2	+2	**6**	
4	Chicago Red Stars	4	0	2	2	3	5	−2	**2**	
5	Kansas City	4	0	1	3	4	8	−4	**1**	

Source: NWSL
Rules for classification: Tiebreakers

Final

May 8, 2021
10:00 PT

Portland Thorns FC	1–1	NJ/NY Gotham FC
Sinclair 8'; Charley (yellow card) 79'	Report	Lewandowski (yellow card) 38'; Lloyd 61'
Penalties
Sinclair (penalty scored); Klingenberg (penalty missed); Horan (penalty scored); Rodríguez (penalty scored); Dunn (penalty scored); Sauerbrunn (penalty scored); Weaver (penalty scored)	6–5	(penalty scored) Long; (penalty scored) Lloyd; (penalty missed) Cudjoe; (penalty scored) Freeman; (penalty scored) Onumonu; (penalty scored) Viens; (penalty missed) Kawasumi

Providence Park, Portland, Oregon
Attendance: 4,588
Referee: Natalie Simon

== Honors ==
=== Professional ===
Men
Competition		Winner
U.S. Open Cup		canceled
MLS Supporters' Shield		New England Revolution
MLS Cup		New York City FC
USL Championship	Regular season	Tampa Bay Rowdies
USL Championship	Playoffs	Orange County SC
USL League One	Regular season	Union Omaha
USL League One	Playoffs	Union Omaha
NISA	Spring 2021	Detroit City FC
NISA	2020–21 Championship	Detroit City FC
NISA	Fall 2021	Detroit City FC

Women
Competition	Winner
NWSL Challenge Cup	Portland Thorns FC
National Women's Soccer League	Washington Spirit
NWSL Shield	Portland Thorns FC
Women's Premier Soccer League	no national champion
United Women's Soccer	Santa Clarita Blue Heat

=== Amateur ===
Men
Competition	Team
USL League Two	Des Moines Menace
National Premier Soccer League	Denton Diablos FC
National Amateur Cup	Lansdowne Yonkers FC
NCAA Division I Soccer Championship	Clemson
NCAA Division II Soccer Championship	Cal State LA
NCAA Division III Soccer Championship	Connecticut College
NAIA Soccer Championship	Keiser University

Women
Competition	Team
NCAA Division I Soccer Championship	Florida State
NCAA Division II Soccer Championship	Grand Valley State University
NCAA Division III Soccer Championship	Christopher Newport University
NAIA Soccer Championship	University of Tennessee Southern
