= 2020–21 Los Angeles Force season =

American soccer club season

Los Angeles Force
2020–21 NISA season
- Owner: Bob Friedland
- Head coach: Fall: Patryk Tenorio (caretaker); Spring: Thales Peterson
- Stadium: Jesse Owens Stadium; Los Angeles, California
- NISA: Fall, Western Conf.: 3rd Spring: 2nd
- Playoffs: Fall: Semifinal; Spring: Runner-up
- Legends Cup: 4th place
- U.S. Open Cup: Did not qualify
- Top goalscorer: League: Christian Chaney: 6 All: Christian Chaney: 7
- Biggest win: Three-way tie
- Biggest defeat: CFC 4–1 LAF (Apr. 13, Legends Cup)

The 2020–21 Los Angeles Force season was the club's second in the National Independent Soccer Association (NISA) and second overall.

== Roster ==
=== Players ===
As of April 8, 2021

No.	Position	Nation	Player
1	GK	USA	Brandon Gomez
2	DF	USA	Kavian Kashani
3	DF	USA	Joseph Patrick Pérez
4	DF	USA	Seamus McLaughlin
5	DF	USA	Ali Kromah
6	DF	USA	Erick Villatoro
7	MF	USA	Abraham Villon
8	MF	BRA	Cyro Reis de Oliveira
9	FW	USA	Chandler Hoffman
10	FW	MEX	Cristian Gordillo
11	FW	USA	Erik Hernandez
12	GK	USA	Kifi Cabrera
13	DF	USA	Juan Pablo Ocegueda
15	FW	ESP	Samuel Goñi
17	FW	USA	Josiah Romero
21	DF	USA	Joshua Culwell
22	MF	USA	Julio Rubio
24	FW	USA	Christopher Ribet
25	DF	USA	D'Morea Alewine
26	DF	USA	Daniel Klemm
27	MF	USA	Edson Alvarado
30	MF	USA	Baldemar Pineda
87	MF	USA	Diego Barrera
94	FW	USA	Christian Chaney
—	MF	MEX	Ángel Gaspar

=== Staff ===
- (Brazil) Thales Peterson – Head coach
- (United States) Salvador Moran – Assistant coach
- (United States) Ramon Melin – Goalkeeper coach
- (Costa Rica) Alberto Gomez – Fitness coach
- (Brazil) Gabriel Torricelli Vicente – Head Physiotherapist

== Friendlies ==
March 19, 2021 Preseason	LA Galaxy II	v	Los Angeles Force	Carson, California
1:00 p.m. PDT		Report		Stadium: Dignity Health Sports Park
Note: Result not published.

March 31, 2021 Preseason	Los Angeles Force	1–0	San Diego 1904 FC	Whittier, California
12:00 p.m. PDT		Report		Stadium: Rio Hondo Stadium

== Competitions ==
=== NISA Fall Season ===
On June 4, NISA announced details for the 2020 Fall Season. The eight member teams would be split into conferences, Eastern and Western, with the Force playing in the later.

The Fall regular season schedule was announced on July 31, 2020. The team played two regular season games against the rest of the Western Conference.

==== Standings ====
Pos	Team	Pld	W	D	L	GF	GA	GD	Pts
1	Oakland Roots SC	2	1	1	0	3	1	+2	4
2	California United Strikers FC	2	0	2	0	1	1	0	2
3	Los Angeles Force	2	0	1	1	0	2	−2	1

Source: NISAofficial.com

==== Results summary ====
Overall								Home						Away					
Pld	W	D	L	GF	GA	GD	Pts	W	D	L	GF	GA	GD	W	D	L	GF	GA	GD
2	0	1	1	0	2	−2	1	0	1	1	0	2	−2	0	0	0	0	0	0

Last updated: September 16, 2020.
Source: Match reports

==== Matches ====
August 29, 2020 Week 1	Los Angeles Force	P–P	California United Strikers FC	Irvine, California
5:00 p.m. PDT		Report		Stadium: OCGP Championship Soccer Stadium
Note: Match was postponed to protest racial injustice after the Shooting of Jacob Blake.

September 6, 2020 Week 2	Los Angeles Force	0–2	Oakland Roots SC	Irvine, California
5:00 p.m. PDT	España (yellow card) 58'; Gordillo (yellow card) 71'; Hale (yellow card) 89'	Report; Broadcast	Fondy 15', 18'; McInerney (yellow card) 36'	Stadium: Championship Soccer Stadium; Attendance: 0 Referee: Omeed Azadpour
Note: Game was played behind closed doors due to the COVID-19 pandemic

September 16, 2020 Week 1 (Replay)	Los Angeles Force	0–0	California United Strikers FC	Irvine, California
7:00 p.m. PDT	Carey (yellow card) 40'; Gordillo (yellow card) 56'; Salazar (yellow card) 70'; Hale (yellow card) 81'	NISA Report; FotMob Report; Broadcast	Garcia-Lopez (yellow card) 80'; Klute (yellow card) 87'	Stadium: OCGP Championship Soccer Stadium; Attendance: 0 Referee: William Hoffman
Note: Match make-up due to the Shooting of Jacob Blake. Game was played behind closed doors due to the COVID-19 pandemic.

=== Fall Playoffs ===
All eight NISA teams qualified for the 2020 Fall tournament, which will be hosted at Keyworth Stadium in Detroit, Michigan, beginning on September 21 ending with the final on October 2.

==== Group stage ====
Pos	Team	Pld	W	D	L	GF	GA	GD	Pts	Qualification
1	Los Angeles Force	3	2	0	1	5	5	0	6	Advance to semifinals
2	Chattanooga FC	3	1	2	0	3	1	+2	5	Advance to semifinals
3	California United Strikers FC	3	1	1	1	5	4	+1	4	
4	New York Cosmos	3	0	1	2	1	4	−3	1	

Updated to match(es) played on September 28, 2020. Source: NISAofficial.com
Rules for classification: 1) Points, 2) Goal differential, 3) Goals scored, 4) Head-to-head record, 5) Coin toss

September 22, 2020 Group stage	Chattanooga FC	2–0	Los Angeles Force	Hamtramck, Michigan
8:00 p.m. EDT	Hoffstatter 45'; Marcano (yellow card) 51'; Lom 63'; Redington (yellow card) 78'; Bement (yellow card) 90+3'	NISA Report; FotMob Report; Broadcast	Torres (red card) 9'; Trejo (penalty missed) 79'	Stadium: Keyworth Stadium; Attendance: 0 Referee: David Eberline
Note: Game was played behind closed doors due to the COVID-19 pandemic

September 25, 2020 Group stage	California United Strikers FC	2–3	Los Angeles Force	Hamtramck, Michigan
8:00 p.m. EDT	Nuño 58'; Thierjung 74'	NISA Report; Broadcast	Gordillo (yellow card) 28', (goal) 37' (pen.), 45+1', 69'	Stadium: Keyworth Stadium; Attendance: 0 Referee: Austin Saint
Note: Game was played behind closed doors due to the COVID-19 pandemic

September 28, 2020 Group stage	New York Cosmos	1–2	Los Angeles Force	Hamtramck, Michigan
8:00 p.m. EDT	Cella (yellow card) 44'; Szetela (yellow card) 53'; Acuña (penalty missed) 63'; John-Brown 90+1'	NISA Report; FotMob Report; Broadcast	Gordillo 15'; Trejo 40'; Villatoro (yellow card) 62' (yellow-red card) 74'; Salazar (yellow card) 70'	Stadium: Keyworth Stadium; Attendance: 0 Referee: Jacob Little
Note: Game was played behind closed doors due to the COVID-19 pandemic

==== Knock-Out Stage ====
September 30, 2020 Semifinals	Los Angeles Force	0–1	Detroit City FC	Hamtramck, Michigan
8:00 p.m. EDT		NISA Report; FotMob Report; Broadcast	Matthews (penalty missed) 7'; Todd (yellow card) 22', (goal) 29'	Stadium: Keyworth Stadium; Attendance: 0 Referee: Carter Brochu
Note: Game was played behind closed doors due to the COVID-19 pandemic

=== NISA Spring Season ===
==== NISA Legends Cup ====
NISA announced initial spring season plans in early February 2021, including starting the season with a tournament in Chattanooga, Tennessee with a standard regular season to follow. The tournament, now called the NISA Legends Cup, was officially announced on March 10 and is scheduled to run between April 13 and 25. All nine NISA members teams taking part in the Spring were divided into three team groups and played a round robin schedule. The highest placing group winner automatically qualified for the tournament final, while the second and third highest group winners played one-another in a semifinal to determine a second finalist.

The Force were drawn into Group 3 alongside New Amsterdam FC and tournament hosts Chattanooga FC.

===== Standings =====
Pos	Team	Pld	W	D	L	GF	GA	GD	Pts	Qualification
1	Chattanooga FC	2	2	0	0	7	1	+6	6	Advance to Legends Cup final
2	Detroit City FC	2	1	1	0	2	0	+2	4	Advance to Legends Cup semifinal
3	San Diego 1904 FC	2	1	1	0	3	2	+1	4	Advance to Legends Cup semifinal
4	Los Angeles Force	2	1	0	1	4	6	−2	3	
5	Michigan Stars FC	2	0	2	0	2	2	0	2	
6	California United Strikers FC	2	0	2	0	1	1	0	2	
7	Maryland Bobcats FC	2	0	1	1	2	3	−1	1	
8	Stumptown AC	2	0	1	1	1	3	−2	1	
9	New Amsterdam FC	2	0	0	2	2	6	−4	0	

Source: nisasoccer.com
Rules for classification: 1) points; 2) goal differential; 3) goals scored; 4) head to head; 5) goals allowed; 6) coin toss

===== Group 2 results =====
Home \ Away	CHA	LAF	NAM
Chattanooga FC	—	4–1	3–0
Los Angeles Force		—	3–2
New Amsterdam FC			—

Source: nisasoccer.com
Legend: Blue = home team win; Yellow = draw; Red = away team win.

===== Matches =====
April 13, 2021 Group 2 Round 1	Chattanooga FC	4–1	Los Angeles Force	Chattanooga, Tennessee
8:00 p.m. EDT	Hernandez 22'; Woodfin 29'; Naglestad 40'; Hoffstatter 64'; D’Amico (yellow card) 85'	NISA Report; CFC Report	Hoffman 6'; Reis de Oliveira (yellow card) 40' (yellow-red card) 90'; Gomez (yellow card) 84'	Stadium: Finley Stadium; Attendance: 1,257

April 19, 2021 Group 2 Round 2	New Amsterdam FC	2–3	Los Angeles Force	Chattanooga, Tennessee
12:00 p.m. EDT	Klemm 37'; Barrera (yellow card) 42'; Alewine (yellow card) 45+1'; Hoffman 70', 77'; Villatoro (yellow card) 82'	Report; Broadcast	Villatoro 14' (o.g.); Bardic 54', (yellow card) 83'	Stadium: Finley Stadium; Referee: Andrew Musashe

April 22, 2021	#4 Los Angeles Force	0–2	#5 Michigan Stars FC	Chattanooga, Tennessee
5:00 p.m. EDT	Gordillo (yellow card) 62'	Report	Suchecki 52'; Nuel 78'	Stadium: Finley Stadium; Referee: Matthew Thompson

==== Regular season ====
The Spring Season schedule was announced on March 18 with each association member playing eight games, four home and four away, in a single round-robin format.

===== Standings =====
Pos	Team	Pld	W	D	L	GF	GA	GD	Pts	Qualification
1	Detroit City FC (Y, X)	8	6	2	0	14	3	+11	20	Advance to season final
2	Los Angeles Force	8	6	0	2	11	6	+5	18	Advance to spring final (Note: If either 2020 Fall Champion Detroit or 2021 Legends Cup runner-up Chattanooga finish the spring season in first place, or both teams finish in the top two, the spot in the spring final will go to the next best team.)
3	Stumptown AC	8	4	3	1	8	4	+4	15	
4	California United Strikers FC	8	4	1	3	12	10	+2	13	
5	Maryland Bobcats FC	8	3	2	3	9	8	+1	11	
6	Chattanooga FC (Z)	8	2	2	4	6	8	−2	8	Advance to spring final
7	San Diego 1904 FC	8	2	1	5	8	17	−9	7	
8	Michigan Stars FC	8	1	2	5	5	12	−7	5	
9	New Amsterdam FC	8	1	1	6	5	10	−5	4	

Source: nisasoccer.com
Rules for classification: 1) points; 2) goal differential; 3) goals scored; 4) head to head; 5) goals allowed; 6) coin toss
(X) Spring Legends Cup champion; (Y) Fall Champion, qualifies for season final; (Z) Spring Legends Cup runner-up, qualifies for spring final

===== Results summary =====
Overall								Home						Away					
Pld	W	D	L	GF	GA	GD	Pts	W	D	L	GF	GA	GD	W	D	L	GF	GA	GD
8	6	0	2	11	6	+5	18	3	0	1	6	2	+4	3	0	1	5	4	+1

Last updated: June 19, 2021.
Source: Match reports

===== Matches =====
May 8, 2021 Week 1	Los Angeles Force	0–1	San Diego 1904 FC	Irvine, California
7:00 p.m. PDT	Gordillo (yellow card) 60'; Barrera (yellow card) 75'; Alvarado (yellow card) 90+3'	Report; Broadcast (Non-U.S.)	Marson (yellow card) 32'; Garduno (yellow card) 45+1'; Esquivel 67'; Cutler (yellow card) 79'	Stadium: Championship Stadium; Referee: Omeed Azadpour
Note: Report missing Garduno's caution, incorrectly claims Gordillo received a second yellow in the 75th, 1904 subs (Lomeli on for Arreola in the 55', Ramirez on for Apollon in the 64'), LAF subs (Culwell on for Barrera in the 82')

May 12, 2021 Week 2	Stumptown AC	0–1	Los Angeles Force	Matthews, North Carolina
7:00 p.m. EDT	Chunga (yellow card) 5'; Ward (yellow card) 28'	Report; Broadcast	Chaney 12', (yellow card) 89'; Barrera (yellow card) 57'	Stadium: Sportsplex at Matthews; Referee: Brandon Gardner
Note: Match report missing Chaney yellow card in 89th minute, Culwell missing from starting XI

May 15, 2021 Week 3	Maryland Bobcats FC	0–2	Los Angeles Force	Germantown, Maryland
7:30 p.m. EDT	Cooper (yellow card) 52' (yellow-red card) 81'; Dengler (yellow card) 71'	Report; Broadcast	Villon (yellow card) 1'; Chaney 53', 70'; Alvarado (yellow card) 59'; Kashani (yellow card) 74'	Stadium: Maryland SoccerPlex
Note: Dengler's card missing in report but shown on broadcast

May 30, 2021 Week 4	Los Angeles Force	2–1	California United Strikers FC	Irvine, California
7:00 p.m. PDT	Gordillo (yellow card) 26'; Chaney (yellow card) 29'; Barrera 48', 80'; Alvarado (yellow card) 86'	Report; Broadcast	Fuerte (yellow card) 47'; Nuño 77'	Stadium: Championship Stadium; Referee: Lorenzo Hernandez

June 2, 2021 Week 5	Detroit City FC	3–0	Los Angeles Force	Hamtramck, Michigan
7:30 p.m. EDT	Faz 46', 71' (pen.); Filerman (yellow card) 65'; Todd 76'	Report; Broadcast	Ocegueda (yellow card) 20'; Gordillo (yellow card) 44'	Stadium: Keyworth Stadium; Attendance: 3,356; Referee: Matt Geringer
Note: Both stream and match report missing both Los Angeles Force subs (Julio Rubio came in between 56th and 75th minutes, Edson Alvarado entered after Todd's goal and is shown on stream)

June 5, 2021 Week 6	Michigan Stars FC	1–2	Los Angeles Force	Washington, Michigan
7:00 p.m. EDT	Satrústegui 63'; Aidoo (yellow card) 77'; Amoo-Mensah (yellow card) 90+1'	Report	Barrera 2'; Chaney 4'; McLaughlin (yellow card) 50'	Stadium: Michigan Stars Sport Center; Referee: Gustavo Solorio

June 9, 2021 Week 7	Los Angeles Force	2–0	Chattanooga FC	Norco, California
7:30 p.m. PDT	Chaney 68', 76'	Report; First Half Stream; Second Half Stream	Dixon (yellow card) 66' (yellow-red card) 71'; Russell (yellow card) 89'	Stadium: SilverLakes Sports Complex
Note: Match originally scheduled to be played at Rio Hondo Stadium in Whittier, California; match report not complete and information (including stats) taken from team Twitter and fan stream

June 19, 2021 Week 8	Los Angeles Force	2–0	New Amsterdam FC	Costa Mesa, California
7:00 p.m. PDT	Gordillo 45'; Barrera (yellow card) 52'; Villon (yellow card) 55'	Report; Broadcast	Guarnera 43' (o.g.); Diosa (yellow card) 49'	Stadium: Vanguard University Soccer Complex
Note: Guarnera's own goal is not shown on the report but is shown on stream. Match called off in the 66th minute due to poor lighting at the venue. According to NISA rules, the score at the time of the match stoppage is final.

===== Spring Playoffs =====
June 30, 2021 Semifinal	Chattanooga FC	2–3	Los Angeles Force	Hamtramck, Michigan
7:30 p.m. EDT	Naglestad 31', 47' (Pen); Robertson (yellow card) 82'; Russell (red card) 88'; McGrath (yellow card) 90+4'	Report; Broadcast	McLaughlin (yellow card) 47'; Chaney 57', (yellow card) 90+2'; Ocegueda 70'; Barrera (yellow card) 78'; Gordillo 83'; Villon (red card) 87'	Stadium: Keyworth Stadium; Attendance: >100; Referee: Jeremy Scheer
Note: Report missing yellow cards from Barrera and Tate but they are shown on broadcast, Russell's red card is misattributed to Richard Dixon, LA's starting XI lists Kashani when it was actually Villatoro, Goñi was subbed into the match in the 54th minute and is shown on stream. Following the match, both red cards issued to Russell and Villon were downgraded to yellow cards.

July 3, 2021 2020–21 NISA Championship	Detroit City FC	1–0	Los Angeles Force	Hamtramck, Michigan
7:30 p.m. EDT	McLaughlin 62' (o.g.); Botello Faz (yellow card) 73'	Report; Broadcast	Gordillo (yellow card) 30'; Moran (Ast. Coach) (yellow card) 69' (yellow-red card) 90+6'; Villatoro (yellow card) 70'; Pérez (yellow card) 74'; Barrera (yellow card) 79'; Goñi (yellow card) 84'; Chaney (yellow card) 90+2'	Stadium: Keyworth Stadium; Attendance: 7,231; Referee: Gustavo Solorio
Note: Moran cards not shown on report but seen on stream including post-match, Goñi sub and yellow card not reported but seen on broadcast, report lists Villatoro twice on Force starting XI instead of Villon

=== U.S. Open Cup ===
As a team playing in a recognized professional league, the Force would normally be automatically qualified for the U.S. Open Cup. However, with the 2021 edition shorted due to the COVID-19 pandemic, NISA has only been allotted 1 to 2 teams spots. On March 29, U.S. Soccer announced 2020 Fall Champion Detroit City FC as NISA's representative in the tournament.

== Squad statistics ==
As of Match played July 3, 2021

=== Appearances and goals ===
No.	Pos	Nat	Player	Total		Fall Season		Fall Playoffs		Legends Cup		Spring Season		Spring Playoffs	
No.	Pos	Nat	Player	Apps	Goals	Apps	Goals	Apps	Goals	Apps	Goals	Apps	Goals	Apps	Goals
Goalkeepers
1	GK	(United States) USA	Brandon Gomez	17	0	1+0	0	4+0	0	2+0	0	8+0	0	2+0	0
12	GK	(United States) USA	Kifi Cabrera	1	0	0+0	0	0+0	0	1+0	0	0+0	0	0+0	0
Defenders
2	DF	(United States) USA	Kavian Kashani	9	0	0+0	0	0+0	0	1+0	0	5+2	0	0+1	0
3	DF	(United States) USA	Joseph Pérez	12	0	0+0	0	0+0	0	1+2	0	6+1	0	2+0	0
4	DF	(United States) USA	Seamus McLaughlin	12	0	0+0	0	0+0	0	3+0	0	7+0	0	2+0	0
5	DF	(United States) USA	Ali Kromah	1	0	0+0	0	0+0	0	1+0	0	0+0	0	0+0	0
6	DF	(United States) USA	Erick Villatoro	16	0	0+2	0	2+1	0	2+1	0	3+3	0	2+0	0
13	DF	(United States) USA	Juan Pablo Ocegueda	12	1	0+0	0	0+0	0	2+0	0	8+0	0	2+0	1
21	DF	(United States) USA	Joshua Culwell	10	0	0+0	0	0+0	0	0+0	0	7+1	0	2+0	0
25	DF	(United States) USA	D'Morea Alewine	11	0	0+0	0	0+0	0	2+1	0	2+4	0	0+2	0
26	DF	(United States) USA	Daniel Klemm	8	1	0+0	0	0+0	0	2+1	1	1+3	0	0+1	0
Midfielders
7	MF	(United States) USA	Abraham Villon	12	0	0+0	0	0+0	0	2+0	0	8+0	0	2+0	0
8	MF	(Brazil) BRA	Cyro Reis de Oliveira	13	0	1+0	0	4+0	0	2+0	0	3+2	0	0+1	0
22	MF	(United States) USA	Julio Rubio	4	0	0+0	0	0+0	0	0+0	0	1+2	0	0+1	0
27	MF	(United States) USA	Edson Alvarado	13	0	0+0	0	0+0	0	2+1	0	5+3	0	2+0	0
30	MF	(United States) USA	Baldemar Pineda	0	0	0+0	0	0+0	0	0+0	0	0+0	0	0+0	0
87	MF	(United States) USA	Diego Barrera	12	3	0+0	0	0+0	0	2+0	0	8+0	3	2+0	0
	MF	(Mexico) MEX	Ángel Gaspar	0	0	0+0	0	0+0	0	0+0	0	0+0	0	0+0	0
Forwards
9	FW	(United States) USA	Chandler Hoffman	3	3	0+0	0	0+0	0	3+0	3	0+0	0	0+0	0
10	FW	(Mexico) MEX	Cristian Gordillo	17	6	2+0	0	4+0	4	3+0	0	6+0	1	2+0	1
11	FW	(United States) USA	Erik Hernandez	6	0	0+0	0	0+0	0	2+1	0	1+2	0	0+0	0
15	FW	(Spain) ESP	Samuel Goñi	2	0	0+0	0	0+0	0	0+0	0	0+0	0	0+2	0
17	FW	(United States) USA	Josiah Romero	6	0	0+0	0	0+0	0	0+3	0	0+3	0	0+0	0
24	FW	(United States) USA	Christopher Ribet	10	0	0+1	0	0+3	0	0+2	0	1+3	0	0+0	0
94	FW	(United States) USA	Christian Chaney	9	7	0+0	0	0+0	0	0+0	0	7+0	6	2+0	1
Left during season
2	DF	(Argentina) ARG	Jonatan Valle	4	0	2+0	0	1+1	0	-	-	-	-	-	-
3	DF	(United States) USA	James Alewine	1	0	1+0	0	0+0	0	-	-	-	-	-	-
4	DF	(Brazil) BRA	Gabriel Silva	0	0	0+0	0	0+0	0	-	-	-	-	-	-
5	DF	(United States) USA	Frank Martinez	4	0	0+1	0	1+2	0	-	-	-	-	-	-
7	MF	(United States) USA	Josue España	6	0	1+1	0	4+0	0	-	-	-	-	-	-
8	FW	(United States) USA	Danny Trejo	6	1	2+0	0	4+0	1	-	-	-	-	-	-
9	FW	(Colombia) COL	Marvin Merlano	1	0	0+1	0	0+0	0	-	-	-	-	-	-
11	FW	(United States) USA	Diran Bebekian	0	0	0+0	0	0+0	0	-	-	-	-	-	-
12	DF	(United States) USA	Gregory Salazar	6	0	2+0	0	4+0	0	-	-	-	-	-	-
13	DF	(Mexico) MEX	Abraham Torres Nilo	5	0	2+0	0	3+0	0	-	-	-	-	-	-
14	MF	(United States) USA	Jimmie Villalobos	5	0	1+0	0	4+0	0	-	-	-	-	-	-
15	DF	(United States) USA	William Raygoza	3	0	0+1	0	0+2	0	-	-	-	-	-	-
16	DF	(United States) USA	Spencer Moeller	4	0	0+0	0	3+1	0	-	-	-	-	-	-
17	FW	(United States) USA	Moja Hale	4	0	0+2	0	0+2	0	-	-	-	-	-	-
19	MF	(The Bahamas) BAH	Quinton Carey	4	0	1+0	0	2+1	0	-	-	-	-	-	-
20	MF	(United States) USA	Jonathan Partida	3	0	2+0	0	0+1	0	-	-	-	-	-	-
22	GK	(United States) USA	Daniel Orozco	0	0	0+0	0	0+0	0	-	-	-	-	-	-
22	FW	(United States) USA	Santiago Galera	1	0	1+0	0	0+0	0	-	-	-	-	-	-
30	FW	(Uruguay) URU	Paolo Cardozo	6	0	2+0	0	4+0	0	-	-	-	-	-	-
31	GK	(United States) USA	Armando Quezada	1	0	1+0	0	0+0	0	-	-	-	-	-	-
70	DF	(United States) USA	Jesus Gonzalez	3	0	0+1	0	0+2	0	-	-	-	-	-	-

=== Goal scorers ===
Place	Position	Nation	Number	Name	Fall Season	Fall Playoffs	Legends Cup	Spring Season	Spring Playoffs	Total
1	FW	(United States)	94	Christian Chaney	-	-	-	6	1	7
2	FW	(Mexico)	10	Cristian Gordillo	0	4	0	1	1	6
3	FW	(United States)	9	Chandler Hoffman	0	0	3	0	0	3
3	MF	(United States)	87	Diego Barrera	0	0	0	3	0	3
4	FW	(United States)	8	Danny Trejo	0	1	-	-	-	1
4	DF	(United States)	13	Juan Pablo Ocegueda	-	-	0	0	1	1
4	DF	(United States)	26	Daniel Klemm	0	0	1	0	0	1
4				Own goal	0	0	0	1	0	1

=== Disciplinary record ===
Number	Nation	Position	Name	Fall Season		Fall Playoff		Legends Cup		Spring Season		Spring Playoffs		Total	
Number	Nation	Position	Name	Booked	Sent off (straight red)	Booked	Sent off (straight red)	Booked	Sent off (straight red)	Booked	Sent off (straight red)	Booked	Sent off (straight red)	Booked	Sent off (straight red)
1	(United States)	GK	Brandon Gomez	0	0	0	0	1	0	0	0	0	0	1	0
2	(United States)	DF	Kavian Kashani	-	-	-	-	0	0	1	0	0	0	1	0
3	(United States)	DF	Joseph Pérez	-	-	-	-	0	0	0	0	1	0	1	0
4	(United States)	DF	Seamus McLaughlin	-	-	-	-	0	0	1	0	1	0	2	0
6	(United States)	DF	Erick Villatoro	0	0	2	1	1	0	0	0	1	0	4	1
7	(United States)	MF	Josue España	1	0	0	0	-	-	-	-	-	-	1	0
7	(United States)	MF	Abraham Villon	0	0	0	0	0	0	1	0	0	1	1	1
8	(Brazil)	MF	Cyro Reis de Oliveira	0	0	0	0	2	1	0	0	0	0	2	1
10	(Mexico)	FW	Cristian Gordillo	2	0	1	0	1	0	3	0	1	0	8	0
12	(United States)	DF	Gregory Salazar	1	0	1	0	-	-	-	-	-	-	2	0
13	(Mexico)	DF	Abraham Torres Nilo	0	0	0	1	-	-	-	-	-	-	0	1
13	(United States)	DF	Juan Pablo Ocegueda	-	-	-	-	0	0	1	0	1	0	2	0
15	(Spain)	FW	Samuel Goñi	-	-	-	-	-	-	-	-	1	0	1	0
17	(United States)	FW	Moja Hale	2	0	0	0	-	-	-	-	-	-	2	0
19	(The Bahamas)	DF	Quinton Carey	1	0	0	0	-	-	-	-	-	-	1	0
25	(United States)	DF	D'Morea Alewine	0	0	0	0	1	0	-	-	-	-	1	0
27	(United States)	MF	Edson Alvarado	-	-	-	-	0	0	3	0	0	0	3	0
87	(United States)	MF	Diego Barrera	0	0	0	0	1	0	2	0	2	0	5	0
94	(United States)	FW	Christian Chaney	-	-	-	-	-	-	2	0	2	0	4	0
