= 2020–21 San Diego 1904 FC season =

American soccer club season

San Diego 1904 FC
2020–21 NISA season
- Owner: Demba Ba; Eden Hazard; Vagno Chandara; Alexandre Gontran
- Head coach: Scott Morrison (Note: During the Legends Cup tournament Alexandre Gontran served as head coach since Morrison could not travel due to COVID complications)
- Stadium: Chula Vista Elite; Athlete Training Center; Chula Vista, California
- NISA: Fall: Did not compete Spring: 7th
- Playoffs: Fall: Did not compete Spring: Did not qualify
- Legends Cup: Semifinals
- U.S. Open Cup: Did not qualify
- Top goalscorer: League: César Romero: 3 All: César Romero: 5
- Biggest win: MBFC 1–2 1904 (Apr. 16, NISA Legends Cup)
- Biggest defeat: 1904 1–4 NAFC (June 16)

The 2020–21 San Diego 1904 FC season was the club's second in the National Independent Soccer Association (NISA) and second overall.

== Roster ==
=== Players ===
As of April 13, 2021

No.	Position	Player	Nation
1	GK	USA	Rodrigo Sarmiento
2	DF	USA	Edwin Lara
3	DF	CAN	James Hone-Blanchet
4	MF	USA	Ozzie Ramos
5	DF	USA	Jonathan Stoop
6	DF	USA	Dallin Cutler
7	MF	USA	Felipe Liborio
8	FW	USA	Faisal Almubaslat
9	FW	USA	Lorenzo Ramirez
10	FW	USA	Moe Espinoza
11	MF	USA	Romario Lomeli
12	MF	USA	Gael Ruiz
13	DF	USA	Eder Arreola
14	MF	MEX	Brandon Zambrano
15	FW	USA	Ivan Garduno
16	GK	USA	Misha Marson
18	FW	USA	Ashkanov Apollon
19	FW	MEX	César Romero
21	DF	MLI	Amadou Mogossirega
22	DF	USA	Andrew Keszweski
23	MF	USA	Diego Esquivel
24	MF	USA	Jomar Munaf
26	MF	SCO	Rhys Gourdie
30	GK	COL	Mateo Zabala

=== Staff ===
- (Scotland) Scott Morrison – Head coach

== Transfers ==
=== In ===
#	Pos.	Player	Signed from	Details	Date	Source
4	DF	(United States) Ozzie Ramos	(Mexico) Atlético Jalisco	Free transfer	March 27, 2021	
8	FW	(United States) Faisal Almubaslat	(United States) Moros FC (UPSL)	Free transfer	March 29, 2021	
11	MF	(United States) Romario Lomeli	(United States) Cal FC	Free transfer	April 6, 2021	
18	FW	(United States) Ashkanov Apollon	(United States) Sacramento Republic FC	Free transfer	May 11, 2021	

=== Out ===
#	Pos.	Player	Signed to	Details	Date	Source
11	FW	(El Salvador) Nelson Blanco	(United States) Oakland Roots SC	Not re-signed	August 6, 2020	
21	GK	(Haiti) Jean Antoine	(United States) Detroit City FC	Not re-signed	August 11, 2020	
4	DF	(United States) Ozzie Ramos	(Mexico) Atlético Jalisco	Not re-signed	August 19, 2020	
	GK	(Cameroon) Antony Siaha	(United States) San Diego Sockers (Indoor)	Not re-signed	January 8, 2021	
19	MF	(England) Billy Garton Jr.	(United States) California United Strikers FC	Not re-signed	April 7, 2021	

== Friendlies ==
February 26, 2021 Scrimmage	California United Strikers FC	4–2	San Diego 1904 FC	Irvine, California
1:30 PM PST		Broadcast		Stadium: Orange County Great Park

March 7, 2021 Scrimmage	San Diego 1904 FC	2–2	White Tigers FC (UPSL)	Temecula, California
11:30 AM PST		Broadcast		Stadium: Patricia H. Birdsall Sports Park

March 20, 2021 Scrimmage	Temecula FC	3–6	San Diego 1904 FC	Temecula, California
3:00 PM PDT		Report		Stadium: Birdsall Sports Park; Attendance: 0
Note: Match consisted of three 35 minute periods and was played behind closed doors

March 28, 2021 Preseason	San Diego Loyal SC	3–1	San Diego 1904 FC	Chula Vista, California
12:00 PM PDT	Ibarra 17'; Adams 22'; Blake 45'	Report	Lomeli 8'	Stadium: Chula Vista Elite Athlete Training Center; Attendance: 0
Note: Match was 75 minutes long and played behind closed doors. The two teams also played a scrimmage between their trialists which ended 6–0 for the Loyal.

March 31, 2021 Preseason	Los Angeles Force	1–0	San Diego 1904 FC	Whittier, California
12:00 p.m. PDT		Report		Stadium: Rio Hondo Stadium

April 4, 2021 Preseason	San Diego 1904 FC	3–2	FC Arizona	Irvine, California
10:00 a.m. PDT		Report; Match Info		Stadium: Orange County Great Park

== Competitions ==
=== 2020 Fall season ===
Initial details for the NISA Fall 2020 season were released on June 4, 2020. In late July, it was announced that 1904 FC would not be taking part in either the Fall Season or NISA Independent Cup due to concerns raised by the COVID-19 pandemic. A second NISA team, Stumptown Athletic, followed shortly after.

On September 2, NISA confirmed San Diego would return for the NISA Spring 2021 season.

=== 2021 Spring Season ===
==== NISA Legends Cup ====
NISA announced initial spring season plans in early February 2021, including starting the season with a tournament in Chattanooga, Tennessee with a standard regular season to follow. The tournament, now called the NISA Legends Cup, was officially announced on March 10 and is scheduled to run between April 13 and 25. All nine NISA members teams take part in the Spring will be divided into three team groups. The highest placing group winner would automatically qualify for the tournament final, while the second and third highest finishing teams overall would play one-another in a semifinal to determine a second finalist.

1904 were drawn into Group 1 alongside Michigan Stars FC and the debuting Maryland Bobcats FC.

===== Group 1 Standings =====
Home \ Away	MAR	MIC	SDG
Maryland Bobcats FC	—	1–1	1–2
Michigan Stars FC		—	1–1
San Diego 1904 FC			—

Source: nisasoccer.com
Legend: Blue = home team win; Yellow = draw; Red = away team win.

===== Legends Cup Standings =====
Pos	Team	Pld	W	D	L	GF	GA	GD	Pts	Qualification
1	Chattanooga FC	2	2	0	0	7	1	+6	6	Advance to Legends Cup final
2	Detroit City FC	2	1	1	0	2	0	+2	4	Advance to Legends Cup semifinal
3	San Diego 1904 FC	2	1	1	0	3	2	+1	4	Advance to Legends Cup semifinal
4	Los Angeles Force	2	1	0	1	4	6	−2	3	
5	Michigan Stars FC	2	0	2	0	2	2	0	2	
6	California United Strikers FC	2	0	2	0	1	1	0	2	
7	Maryland Bobcats FC	2	0	1	1	2	3	−1	1	
8	Stumptown AC	2	0	1	1	1	3	−2	1	
9	New Amsterdam FC	2	0	0	2	2	6	−4	0	

Source: nisasoccer.com
Rules for classification: 1) points; 2) goal differential; 3) goals scored; 4) head to head; 5) goals allowed; 6) coin toss

===== Matches =====
April 13, 2021 Group 1 Round 1	Michigan Stars FC	1–1	San Diego 1904 FC	Chattanooga, Tennessee
12:00 p.m. EDT	Abraham (yellow card) 29'; Satrústegui 60'; Vang (yellow card) 67'; Aidoo (yellow card) 85' (yellow-red card) 90+3'	NISA Report; Stars Report; Broadcast	Lara (yellow card) 8'; Cutler (yellow card) 45+1'; Espinoza 90+4' (pen.)	Stadium: Finley Stadium; Referee: Andrew Musashe

April 16, 2021 Group 1 Round 2	Maryland Bobcats FC	1–2	San Diego 1904 FC	Chattanooga, Tennessee
5:00 p.m. EDT	Argueta (yellow card) 20', (goal) 61'; Akinlosotu (yellow card) 28'; Mason (yellow card) 39'; Sesay (yellow card) 42' (yellow-red card) 90+1'; Caulker (yellow card) 80' (yellow-red card) 82'	Report	Romero 13', 14'; Lomeli (yellow card) 30'; Arreola (yellow card) 68'	Stadium: Finley Stadium; Referee: Ben Meyer

April 22, 2021 Legends Cup Semifinal	#2 Detroit City FC	1–0	#3 San Diego 1904 FC	Chattanooga, Tennessee
8:00 p.m. EDT	Todd (yellow card) 34'; Carroll 43'; Rodriguez (yellow card) 89'	Report	Lara (yellow card) 84'	Stadium: Finley Stadium

==== Regular season ====
The Spring Season schedule was announced on March 18 with each association member playing eight games, four home and four away, in a single round-robin format.

===== Standings =====
Pos	Team	Pld	W	D	L	GF	GA	GD	Pts	Qualification
1	Detroit City FC (Y, X)	8	6	2	0	14	3	+11	20	Advance to season final
2	Los Angeles Force	8	6	0	2	11	6	+5	18	Advance to spring final (Note: If either 2020 Fall Champion Detroit or 2021 Legends Cup runner-up Chattanooga finish the spring season in first place, or both teams finish in the top two, the spot in the spring final will go to the next best team.)
3	Stumptown AC	8	4	3	1	8	4	+4	15	
4	California United Strikers FC	8	4	1	3	12	10	+2	13	
5	Maryland Bobcats FC	8	3	2	3	9	8	+1	11	
6	Chattanooga FC (Z)	8	2	2	4	6	8	−2	8	Advance to spring final
7	San Diego 1904 FC	8	2	1	5	8	17	−9	7	
8	Michigan Stars FC	8	1	2	5	5	12	−7	5	
9	New Amsterdam FC	8	1	1	6	5	10	−5	4	

Source: nisasoccer.com
Rules for classification: 1) points; 2) goal differential; 3) goals scored; 4) head to head; 5) goals allowed; 6) coin toss
(X) Spring Legends Cup champion; (Y) Fall Champion, qualifies for season final; (Z) Spring Legends Cup runner-up, qualifies for spring final

===== Results summary =====
Overall								Home						Away					
Pld	W	D	L	GF	GA	GD	Pts	W	D	L	GF	GA	GD	W	D	L	GF	GA	GD
8	2	1	5	8	17	−9	7	1	1	2	4	8	−4	1	0	3	4	9	−5

Last updated: June 26, 2021.
Source: Match reports

===== Matches =====
May 8, 2021 Week 1	Los Angeles Force	0–1	San Diego 1904 FC	Whittier, California
7:00 p.m. PDT	Gordillo (yellow card) 60'; Barrera (yellow card) 75'; Alvarado (yellow card) 90+3'	Report; Broadcast (Non-U.S.)	Marson (yellow card) 32'; Garduno (yellow card) 45+1'; Esquivel 67'; Cutler (yellow card) 79'	Stadium: Rio Hondo Stadium; Referee: Omeed Azadpour
Note: Report missing Ivan Garduno's caution, 1904 subs (Lomeli on for Arreola in the 55', Ramirez on for Apollon in the 64'), LAF subs (Culwell on for Barrera in the 82')

May 15, 2021 Week 2	San Diego 1904 FC	1–3	Detroit City FC	Chula Vista, California
7:00 p.m. PDT	Ramos (yellow card) 32'; Keszweski (yellow card) 35'; Romero Jr (yellow card) 70', (goal) 87' (pen.)	NISA Report; Detroit Report; Broadcast	Manning 45+3'; Rutz 51'; Todd (yellow card) 52'; Filerman 84'	Stadium: Chula Vista Elite Athlete Training Center; Referee: Randy Hoffman

May 29, 2021 Week 3	San Diego 1904 FC	1–0	Michigan Stars FC	Chula Vista, California
7:00 p.m. PDT	Ramirez 2'; Almubaslat (yellow card) 72'; Espinoza (yellow card) 90+2'	Report; Broadcast	Chalbaud (yellow card) 32'; Reynolds (yellow card) 43'	Stadium: Chula Vista Elite Athlete Training Center; Referee: Brendon Gardner

June 9, 2021 Week 4	California United Strikers FC	3–1	San Diego 1904 FC	Irvine, California
2:00 p.m. PDT	Ebert (red card) 27'; Waldrep (yellow card) 28'; Thierjung 72'; Lopez 86'; Garton Jr. 90'	Report; Highlights	Cutler 51', (yellow card) 55'; Ramos (yellow card) 54'	Stadium: Auxiliary Field at Great Park
Note: Not streamed, match report incomplete with details and stats taken from Strikers' Twitter. All players listed as subs for 1904 made appearances during the match.

June 12, 2021 Week 5	San Diego 1904 FC	1–1	Chattanooga FC	Chula Vista, California
7:00 p.m. PDT	Ramos (yellow card) 37'; Gourdie 45+2'; Keszweski (yellow card) 85'	Report; Broadcast	Coleman (yellow card) 24'; McKinley (yellow card) 46'; McGrath 89'	Stadium: Chula Vista Elite Athlete Training Center; Referee: Samantha Martinez

June 16, 2021 Week 6	San Diego 1904 FC	1–4	New Amsterdam FC	Chula Vista, California
7:00 p.m. PDT	Espinoza (yellow card) 24'; Hone-Blanchet 57'; Ramos (yellow card) 73'; Cutler (yellow card) 79'	Report; Broadcast	John-Brown 7', 11'; Mikaheel (yellow card) 14'; Barone 45+1'; Bermudez 77'	Stadium: Chula Vista Elite Athlete Training Center; Referee: Jervis Atagana

June 22, 2021 Week 7	Stumptown AC	3–1	San Diego 1904 FC	Matthews, North Carolina
7:00 p.m. EDT	McGrath 8', (yellow card) 89'; Ward 13'; Garcia Sosa 45+3'	Report; Broadcast	Romero 10'; Ramos (yellow card) 40'	Stadium: Sportsplex at Matthews; Referee: Alexander Zhelyazkov

June 26, 2021 Week 8	Maryland Bobcats FC	3–1	San Diego 1904 FC	Germantown, Maryland
7:30 p.m. EDT	Banjo 20'; Argueta (yellow card) 69'; Balogun 71'; Sesay 90'	NISA Report; FotMob Report; Match Recording	Gourdie (yellow card) 46'; Romero (yellow card) 70', (goal) 85'; Espinoza (yellow card) 89'	Stadium: Maryland SoccerPlex; Referee: Balvir Cabrera Garcia
Note: Match was not streamed due to technical issue and the match report only shows the starting lineups. Further detail was gathered from team social media and a match recording provided by Maryland. 1904 Subs (63' Lomeli in for Almubaslat, 75' Ramirez Jr in for Esquivel), MBFC Subs (56' Pato in for Alvarado, 79' Mason in for Balogun / Gray in for Kao / Kahsai in for Banjo, 85' Blystone in for Dawkins). Additionally, match report incorrectly lists Marson as starting GK for 1904 when it was actually Sarmiento.

=== U.S. Open Cup ===
As a team playing in a recognized professional league, San Diego would normally be automatically qualified for the U.S. Open Cup. However, with the 2021 edition shorted due to the COVID-19 pandemic, NISA has only been allotted 1 to 2 teams spots. On March 29, U.S. Soccer announced 2020 Fall Champion Detroit City FC as NISA's representative in the tournament.

== Squad statistics ==
As of Match played June 26, 2021

=== Appearances and goals ===
No.	Pos	Nat	Player	Total		Legends Cup		Spring Season	
No.	Pos	Nat	Player	Apps	Goals	Apps	Goals	Apps	Goals
Goalkeepers
1	GK	(United States) USA	Rodrigo Sarmiento	1	0	0+0	0	1+0	0
16	GK	(United States) USA	Misha Marson	7	0	3+0	0	4+0	0
30	GK	(Colombia) COL	Mateo Zabala	2	0	0+0	0	2+0	0
Defenders
2	DF	(United States) USA	Edwin Lara	9	0	3+0	0	4+2	0
3	DF	(Canada) CAN	James Hone-Blanchet	7	1	0+0	0	2+5	1
5	DF	(United States) USA	Jonathan Stoop	6	0	3+0	0	1+2	0
6	DF	(United States) USA	Dallin Cutler	10	1	2+0	0	8+0	1
13	DF	(United States) USA	Eder Arreola	9	0	2+1	0	4+2	0
21	DF	(Mali) MLI	Amadou Mogossirega	0	0	0+0	0	0+0	0
22	DF	(United States) USA	Andrew Keszweski	6	0	0+0	0	6+0	0
Midfielders
4	MF	(United States) USA	Ozzie Ramos	11	0	3+0	0	8+0	0
7	MF	(United States) USA	Felipe Liborio	11	0	3+0	0	7+1	0
11	MF	(United States) USA	Romario Lomeli	10	0	3+0	0	5+2	0
12	MF	(United States) USA	Gael Ruiz	2	0	0+2	0	0+0	0
14	MF	(Mexico) MEX	Brandon Zambrano	0	0	0+0	0	0+0	0
23	MF	(United States) USA	Diego Esquivel	9	1	2+1	0	1+5	1
24	MF	(United States) USA	Jomar Munaf	10	0	0+2	0	2+6	0
26	MF	(Scotland) SCO	Rhys Gourdie	5	1	0+0	0	5+0	1
Forwards
8	FW	(United States) USA	Faisal Almubaslat	11	0	3+0	0	7+1	0
9	FW	(United States) USA	Lorenzo Ramirez	11	1	1+2	0	6+2	1
10	FW	(United States) USA	Moe Espinoza	9	1	3+0	1	5+1	0
15	FW	(United States) USA	Ivan Garduno	5	0	0+3	0	1+1	0
18	FW	(United States) USA	Ashkanov Apollon	2	0	0+0	0	2+0	0
19	FW	(Mexico) MEX	César Romero	8	5	2+0	2	6+0	3
Left during season

=== Goal scorers ===
Place	Position	Nation	Number	Name	Legends Cup	Spring Season	Total
1	FW	(Mexico)	19	César Romero	2	3	5
2	DF	(Canada)	3	James Hone-Blanchet	0	1	1
2	DF	(United States)	6	Dallin Cutler	0	1	1
2	FW	(United States)	9	Lorenzo Ramirez	0	1	1
2	FW	(United States)	10	Moe Espinoza	1	0	1
2	MF	(United States)	23	Diego Esquivel	0	1	1
2	MF	(Scotland)	26	Rhys Gourdie	0	1	1

=== Disciplinary record ===
Number	Nation	Position	Name	Legends Cup		Spring Season		Total	
Number	Nation	Position	Name	Booked	Sent off (straight red)	Booked	Sent off (straight red)	Booked	Sent off (straight red)
2	(United States)	DF	Edwin Lara	2	0	0	0	2	0
4	(United States)	MF	Ozzie Ramos	0	0	5	0	5	0
6	(United States)	DF	Dallin Cutler	1	0	3	0	4	0
8	(United States)	FW	Faisal Almubaslat	0	0	1	0	1	0
10	(United States)	FW	Moe Espinoza	0	0	3	0	3	0
11	(United States)	MF	Romario Lomeli	1	0	0	0	1	0
13	(United States)	DF	Eder Arreola	1	0	0	0	1	0
15	(United States)	FW	Ivan Garduno	0	0	1	0	1	0
16	(United States)	GK	Misha Marson	0	0	1	0	1	0
19	(United States)	FW	César Romero	0	0	2	0	2	0
22	(United States)	DF	Andrew Keszweski	0	0	2	0	2	0
26	(Scotland)	MF	Rhys Gourdie	0	0	1	0	1	0
