= 2020–21 National Independent Soccer Association season =

1st season of the National Independent Soccer Association

National Independent Soccer Association
- Season: 2020–21 season
- Dates: Fall: Aug. 8 – Oct. 2, 2020; Spring: Apr. 13 – Jun. 30, 2021
- Champions: Fall: Detroit City FC; Spring: Detroit City FC; Overall: Detroit City FC
- Matches: 49
- Goals: 104 (2.12 per match)
- Top goalscorer: Christian Chaney (LA): 6
- Biggest home win: DCFC 3–0 NAFC (September 5, 2020); CFC 3–0 NAFC (September 16, 2020); CAL 3–0 MSFC (May 16, 2021); DCFC 3–0 LAF (June 2, 2021)
- Biggest away win: NAFC 0–3 MSFC (September 12, 2020); CAL 0–3 DCFC (May 12, 2021); 1904 1–4 NAFC (June 16, 2021)
- Highest scoring: 1904 1–4 NAFC (June 16, 2021)
- Longest winning run: 4 matches Detroit City FC (May 1, 2021 – May 15, 2021)
- Longest unbeaten run: 11 matches Detroit City FC (Aug. 22, 2020 – June 26, 2021)
- Longest winless run: 9 matches New Amsterdam FC (Aug. 21, 2020 – June 5, 2021)
- Longest losing run: 9 matches New Amsterdam FC (Aug. 21, 2020 – June 5, 2021)
- Highest attendance: 4,741; DCFC 2–1 CFC (June 26, 2021)
- Lowest attendance: 517; CFC 3–0 NAFC (Sept. 16, 2020)
- Total attendance: Fall: 1,435; Spring: 23,227 (Note: All reported attendances)
- Average attendance: Fall: N/A (Note: All but two Chattanooga FC home matches were played behind closed doors due to the COVID-19 pandemic); Spring: N/A (Note: Multiple member clubs were unable to host fans and not every team consistently reported attendance figures)
- All statistics correct as of June 26, 2021.

The 2020–21 NISA season was the second season of the National Independent Soccer Association's third-division soccer competition. The regular season was split into two halves, Fall and Spring, with playoffs at the end of each, and a Championship Match that had the Fall champion host the Spring champion. This season also saw the introduction of a new cup competition, the NISA Independent Cup, that features independent clubs from various professional and semi-professional leagues across the United States.

== Teams ==
The eight teams that participated in the inaugural 2019-20 NISA season were joined by three expansion teams: New York Cosmos and New Amsterdam FC for the full season. Two of the existing teams, San Diego 1904 and Stumptown Athletic, announced that they will not participate in the Fall season, but intend to return for the Spring season. On October 13, it was announced that Maryland Bobcats FC had been accepted into the league with the plan of starting play in Spring of 2021. The team had been taking part in the Mid-Atlantic region of the NISA Independent Cup and won the group following this announcement. On November 6, New Jersey Teamsterz FC announced that they were not joining for the Spring 2021 season, despite initially being included in the Spring 2021 competitors. Citing the on-going pandemic, they clarified they were joining the lower tiers of NISA in preparation for joining in Fall of 2021.

=== Stadiums and locations ===
Locations of announced clubs
- Full season club
- Fall-only club
- Spring-only club

Team	Location	Stadium	Capacity
California United Strikers FC	Irvine, California	Championship Stadium	5,000
Chattanooga FC	Chattanooga, Tennessee	Finley Stadium	20,668
Detroit City FC	Hamtramck, Michigan	Keyworth Stadium	7,933
Los Angeles Force	Whittier, California	Rio Hondo College	1,000
Maryland Bobcats FC (Note: Expansion team for the Spring 2021 season)	Boyds, Maryland	Maryland SoccerPlex	4,000
Michigan Stars FC	Pontiac, Michigan	Ultimate Soccer Arena	5,000
New Amsterdam FC	Warwick, New York	Hudson Sports Complex	1,200
New York Cosmos (Note: Played in the Fall season, but paused team operations before the Spring season due to the COVID-19 pandemic.)	Uniondale, New York	Mitchel Athletic Complex	5,000
Oakland Roots SC (Note: Played in the Fall season, but withdrew before the Spring season, after joining the USL Championship.)	Oakland, California	Laney College	5,500
San Diego 1904 FC (Note: On hiatus during Fall 2020 season)	San Diego, California	Lincoln High School	3,700
Stumptown Athletic	Matthews, North Carolina	Sportsplex at Matthews	5,000

=== Personnel and sponsorship ===
Note: The league has signed a deal with Hummel to be the official kit manufacturer, but it still allows clubs to find their own provider.

Team	Head coach	Captain(s)	Kit manufacturer	Shirt sponsor
California United Strikers FC	(United States) Don Ebert	(United States) Xavier Fuerte	(United States) Nike	Taco Bell
Chattanooga FC	(United States) Peter Fuller	(Spain) Juan Hernandez	(Denmark) Hummel	Fall: Volkswagen Spring: Louisiana Hot Sauce, VfL Wolfsburg
Detroit City FC	(England) Trevor James	(Republic of Ireland) Stephen Carroll	(Germany) Adidas	Metro Detroit Chevy Dealers
Los Angeles Force	(Brazil) Thales Peterson	(United States) Joshua Culwell	(Denmark) Hummel	—
Michigan Stars FC	(Germany) Alexander Strehmel	(United States) Kyle Nuel	(Denmark) Hummel	HTC
New Amsterdam FC	(Germany) Maximilian Mansfield	(United States) Daniel Vicente	Fall: (Italy) Erreà Spring: (United States) Icarus	Fruit Street
Only played the Spring Season
Maryland Bobcats FC	(United States) Phil Nana	(United States) Kay Banjo	(Denmark) Hummel	Dog Haus
San Diego 1904 FC	(Scotland) Scott Morrison	(United States) Ozzie Ramos	(United States) Nike	Live Up Nutrition
Stumptown Athletic	(United States) Rod Underwood	(United States) Franky Martinez	(Denmark) Hummel	OrthoCarolina Healthcare
Only played the Fall Season
New York Cosmos	(United States) Carlos Mendes	(United States) Danny Szetela	(Canada) INARIA	Mediacom
Oakland Roots SC	(United States) Jordan Ferrell	(Canada) Nana Attakora	(United States) Nike	Oaklandish

=== Managerial changes ===
Team	Outgoing manager	Manner of departure	Date of vacancy	Position in table	Incoming manager	Date of appointment
Los Angeles Force	(Brazil) Thales Peterson	Unknown		Preseason	(Poland) Patryk Tenorio (caretaker)	August 2020
New Amsterdam	(United States) Eric Wynalda	Mutual Parting	August 17, 2020	Preseason	(Germany) Maximilian Mansfield (interim)	August 17, 2020
Los Angeles Force	(Poland) Patryk Tenorio (caretaker)	Coach return		Offseason	(Brazil) Thales Peterson	January 2021
San Diego 1904 FC	(France) Alexandre Gontran	Stepping down		Offseason	(Scotland) Scott Morrison	April 2021

== NISA Independent Cup ==
Following the cancellation of the 2020 Spring Season on April 27, 2020 due to the COVID-19 pandemic, NISA announced initial Fall 2020 season plans and the creation of a new tournament called the NISA Independent Cup. The region-based competition would include NISA clubs, including new expansion sides the New York Cosmos and New Amsterdam FC, and both independent professional and high quality amateur teams.

On July 1, NISA officially announced the cup along with the 15 teams that would be participating. In total, four member clubs took part with the rest of the field consisting of teams from the National Premier Soccer League, United Premier Soccer League, and Gulf Coast Premier League. The participants were split into four geographical regions with each operating independently and making decisions (format, tiebreaker rules, fan attendance policies, etc.) autonomously. All games were live streamed online through MyCujoo, with some also being broadcast on local television.

Central Plains
St	Team	League
(Mississippi)	Gaffa FC	GCPL
(Texas)	Lone Star Republic	UPSL
(Louisiana)	Louisiana Krewe FC	GCPL
(Texas)	Mansfield Revolution SC	UPSL

Great Lakes
St	Team	League
(Ohio)	Cleveland SC	NPSL
(Michigan)	Detroit City FC	NISA
(New York (state))	FC Buffalo	NPSL

Mid-Atlantic
St	Team	League
(Maryland)	FC Baltimore Christos	NPSL
(Maryland)	Maryland Bobcats FC	NPSL
(New York (state))	New Amsterdam FC	NISA
(New York (state))	New York Cosmos	NISA

Southeast
St	Team	League
(Tennessee)	Chattanooga FC	NISA
(Georgia (U.S. state))	Georgia Revolution FC	NPSL
(Georgia (U.S. state))	Savannah Clovers FC	UPSL
(South Carolina)	Soda City FC	UPSL

The Great Lakes Division also served as a rekindling of the Rust Belt Derby, a former in-season competition previously held in the NPSL, with 2019 NPSL national semifinalist Cleveland SC taking the place of the now folded AFC Cleveland.

=== Central Plains Region ===
The four teams were split into pairs before playing two games against one-another. If tied on aggregate after two games, with no away goal rule, teams would play two 10-minute overtime periods followed by a penalty kick shootout if necessary. Winner of each aggregate competition meet in the Championship match.

Both matches between Louisiana Krewe and Gaffa were played at Holden Stadium on the campus of Pearl River Community College in Poplarville, Mississippi.

Lone Star Republic hosted the first game against Mansfield Revolution at Greenhill School in Addison, Texas. The Revolution hosted the second at Mansfield Summit High School in Arlington, Texas.

==== Semifinals ====
Team 1	Agg.	Team 2	1st leg	2nd leg
Louisiana Krewe FC	3–3 (8–9 p)	(Mississippi) Gaffa FC	0–1	3–2
Lone Star Republic (Texas)	9–1	(Texas) Mansfield Revolution SC	6–0	3–1

==== Final ====
August 1, 2020	Lone Star Republic (Texas)	0–1	(Mississippi) Gaffa FC	Bossier City, Louisiana
7:00 PM CST	Ameke (yellow card) 35'; Ketterhagen (yellow card) 45+1'	Report; MyCujoo Broadcast	Avila (yellow card) 21'; Costa (yellow card) 25'; Santos (yellow card) 78'; Cosgrave 86'	Stadium: First Bossier Stadium Field; Attendance: 0 Referee: Alexander Connelly
Note: Game was played behind closed doors due to the COVID-19 pandemic

=== Great Lakes Region ===
The three teams competed in a round-robin competition, each playing a total of two games. Any games tied after 90 minutes were set to be decided by a penalty kick shootout. Both games involving Detroit City took place at Keyworth Stadium in Hamtramck, Michigan. The remaining match between Cleveland and Buffalo was played at Erie Veterans Memorial Stadium in Erie, Pennsylvania.

The Great Lakes Champion was determined by most points, followed by head-to head, followed by goal differential.

==== Standings ====
Pos	Team	Pld	W	PW	PL	L	GF	GA	GD	Pts
1	Detroit City FC (C)	2	2	0	0	0	6	0	+6	6
2	Cleveland SC	2	1	0	0	1	3	4	−1	3
3	FC Buffalo	2	0	0	0	2	1	6	−5	0

Source: nisaofficial.com
Rules for classification: 1) points; 2) head to head; 3) goal differential.
(C) Champion

==== Results ====
Home \ Away	CSC	DCFC	FCB
Cleveland SC	—		
Detroit City FC	3–0	—	3–0
FC Buffalo	1–3		—

Source: nisaofficial.com
Legend: Blue = home team win; Yellow = draw; Red = away team win.

=== Mid-Atlantic Region ===
The four teams completed in a round-robin competition, playing a total of three games each. The Mid-Atlantic Champion was determined by most points, followed by head-to head, followed by goal differential.

All games were originally going to be hosted by the Bobcats at the Maryland SoccerPlex in Germantown, Maryland behind closed doors. On July 24, NISA announced that region's tournament was postponed due to a surge of COVID-19 cases in Maryland and the subsequent closing of Maryland SoccerPlex to professional sports. On July 28, NISA announced that five of the region's six games would be played at Evergreen Sportsplex in Leesburg, Virginia, with the August 2 match between New Amsterdam and the Cosmos being played at Hudson Sports Complex in Warwick, New York.

The Thursday, August 6 match between New Amsterdam and Maryland Bobcats was called off mid-way through the first half due to inclement weather, with the following match between the Cosmos and Baltimore postponed. On August 22, NISA announced the first make-up date with New Amsterdam taking on Maryland on Sunday, August 23 at YSC Sports Complex in Wayne, Pennsylvania. The second make-up was announced on September 25 with the Cosmos hosting Baltimore at Mitchel Athletic Complex in Uniondale, New York on Saturday, October 10.

==== Standings ====
Pos	Team	Pld	W	D	L	GF	GA	GD	Pts
1	Maryland Bobcats FC (C)	3	1	2	0	9	3	+6	5
2	FC Baltimore Christos	3	1	2	0	6	3	+3	5
3	New York Cosmos	3	0	3	0	4	4	0	3
4	New Amsterdam FC	3	0	1	2	2	11	−9	1

Source: nisaofficial.com
Rules for classification: 1) points; 2) head to head; 3) goal differential.
(C) Champions

==== Results ====
Home \ Away	FCB	MDB	NAM	NYC
FC Baltimore Christos	—	1–1	3–0	
Maryland Bobcats FC		—		1–1
New Amsterdam FC		1–7	—	
New York Cosmos	2–2		1–1	—

Updated to match(es) played on August 23, 2020. Source: nisaofficial.com
Legend: Blue = home team win; Yellow = draw; Red = away team win.

=== Southeast Region ===
The four teams competed in a round-robin competition against one-another in various venues in Georgia, South Carolina, and Tennessee.

Both Finley Stadium in Chattanooga, Tennessee and Memorial Stadium in Columbia, South Carolina hosted matches the first two weeks. The final group stage round that was set to be played at Columbia International University in Columbia, South Carolina on July 25 was called off due to weather. The Southeast Regional Champion will now be determined by group stage points instead of the originally scheduled championship final and third place match, with the final set of games moved to Finley Stadium on August 1.

==== Standings ====
Pos	Team	Pld	W	D	L	GF	GA	GD	Pts
1	Chattanooga FC (C)	3	3	0	0	9	1	+8	9
2	Soda City FC	3	1	1	1	4	6	−2	4
3	Savannah Clovers FC	3	1	0	2	2	5	−3	3
4	Georgia Revolution FC	3	0	1	2	3	6	−3	1

Source: nisaofficial.com
(C) Champions

==== Results ====
Home \ Away	CHT	GRV	SAC	SCY
Chattanooga FC	—	3–1	3–0	
Georgia Revolution FC		—		
Savannah Clovers FC		1–0	—	1–2
Soda City FC	0–3	2–2		—

Source: nisaofficial.com
Legend: Blue = home team win; Yellow = draw; Red = away team win.

== Fall season ==
On June 4, NISA announced the Fall season format. The season would be split into two separate formats: a regionalized regular season commencing in August, dividing the eight member teams into two conferences; Eastern and Western, followed by a single location tournament in late October that would determine a Fall Season champion.

Following the Shooting of Jacob Blake on August 23, the three league matches scheduled for the weekend of August 29 were postponed in protest of racial injustice. The games were rescheduled for later dates.

=== Eastern Conference ===
==== Standings ====
Pos	Team	Pld	W	D	L	GF	GA	GD	Pts
1	Chattanooga FC	4	3	0	1	8	3	+5	**9**
2	Michigan Stars FC	4	2	2	0	6	2	+4	**8**
3	New York Cosmos	4	1	2	1	5	4	+1	**5**
4	Detroit City FC	4	1	2	1	3	2	+1	**5**
5	New Amsterdam FC	4	0	0	4	1	12	−11	**0**

Source: NISAofficial.com

==== Results ====
Home \ Away	CHA	DET	MIC	NAM	NYC
Chattanooga FC	—	—	—	3–0	2–1
Detroit City FC	0–2	—	—	3–0	—
Michigan Stars FC	2–1	0–0	—	—	—
New Amsterdam FC	—	—	0–3	—	1–3
New York Cosmos	—	0–0	1–1	—	—

Source: NISAOfficial.com
Legend: Blue = home team win; Yellow = draw; Red = away team win.

=== Western Conference ===
==== Standings ====
Pos	Team	Pld	W	D	L	GF	GA	GD	Pts
1	Oakland Roots SC	2	1	1	0	3	1	+2	**4**
2	California United Strikers FC	2	0	2	0	1	1	0	**2**
3	Los Angeles Force	2	0	1	1	0	2	−2	**1**

Source: NISAofficial.com

==== Results ====
Home \ Away	CAL	LAF	OAK
California United Strikers FC	—	—	1–1
Los Angeles Force	0–0	—	0–2
Oakland Roots SC	—	—	—

Updated to match(es) played on September 16, 2020. Source: NISAOfficial.com
Legend: Blue = home team win; Yellow = draw; Red = away team win.

=== Playoffs ===
All 8 teams competed in the 2020 Fall tournament, which happened from September 21 to October 2, at Keyworth Stadium, in Hamtramack. The teams were split into two groups of four, based on their regular season records, with the top two teams in each group advancing to the semifinals. The winner of the Fall tournament will host the winner of the Spring season in the inaugural NISA Championship match.

==== Group stage ====
===== Group A =====
Pos	Team	Pld	W	D	L	GF	GA	GD	Pts	Qualification
1	Oakland Roots SC	3	2	0	1	5	2	+3	**6**	Advance to semifinals
2	Detroit City FC	3	2	0	1	6	5	+1	**6**	Advance to semifinals
3	Michigan Stars FC	3	1	1	1	4	3	+1	**4**	
4	New Amsterdam FC	3	0	1	2	4	9	−5	**1**	

Source: NISAofficial.com
Rules for classification: 1) Points, 2) Goal differential, 3) Goals scored, 4) Head-to-head record, 5) Coin toss

Home \ Away	NAM	DET	MIC	OAK
New Amsterdam FC	—	—	—	—
Detroit City FC	4–2	—	—	—
Michigan Stars FC	2–2	2–0	—	—
Oakland Roots SC	3–0	1–2	1–0	—

Source: NISAOfficial.com
Legend: Blue = home team win; Yellow = draw; Red = away team win.

===== Group B =====
Pos	Team	Pld	W	D	L	GF	GA	GD	Pts	Qualification
1	Los Angeles Force	3	2	0	1	5	5	0	**6**	Advance to semifinals
2	Chattanooga FC	3	1	2	0	3	1	+2	**5**	Advance to semifinals
3	California United Strikers FC	3	1	1	1	5	4	+1	**4**	
4	New York Cosmos	3	0	1	2	1	4	−3	**1**	

Updated to match(es) played on September 28, 2020. Source: NISAofficial.com
Rules for classification: 1) Points, 2) Goal differential, 3) Goals scored, 4) Head-to-head record, 5) Coin toss

Home \ Away	LAF	NYC	CAL	CHA
Los Angeles Force	—	—	—	—
New York Cosmos	1–2	—	—	—
California United Strikers FC	2–3	2–0	—	—
Chattanooga FC	2–0	0–0	1–1	—

Updated to match(es) played on September 28, 2020. Source: NISAOfficial.com
Legend: Blue = home team win; Yellow = draw; Red = away team win.

===== Knock-Out Round =====
Semifinals; September 30, 2020
**A1**	**Oakland Roots SC**	**3**
B2	Chattanooga FC	2
B1	Los Angeles Force	0
**A2**	**Detroit City FC**	**1**

Finals; October 2, 2020
A1	Oakland Roots SC	1
**A2**	**Detroit City FC**	**2**

Bold = winner
* = after extra time, ( ) = penalty shootout score
Source: nisaofficial.com

====== Semifinals ======
September 30, 2020	**Oakland Roots SC**	**3–2**	**Chattanooga FC**	Keyworth Stadium; Hamtramck, Michigan
5:00pm (EDT)	Rodriguez 6'; Heredia 19'; Pearson (yellow card) 31'; Fondy 48'; Irwin (yellow card) 85'; McInerney (yellow card) 90+4'	NISA Report; FotMob Report; Broadcast	McGrath 46'; Marcano 77'; Russell (yellow card) 90+4'	Attendance: 0 Referee: Samuel Pizzimenti
Note: Game was played behind closed doors due to the COVID-19 pandemic

September 30, 2020	**Los Angeles Force**	**0–1**	**Detroit City FC**	Keyworth Stadium; Hamtramck, Michigan
8:00pm (EDT)		NISA Report; FotMob Report; Broadcast	Todd (yellow card) 22', (goal) 29'	Attendance: 0 Referee: Carter Brochu
Note: Game was played behind closed doors due to the COVID-19 pandemic

====== NISA Fall Championship ======
October 2, 2020	**Oakland Roots SC**	**1–2**	**Detroit City FC**	Keyworth Stadium; Hamtramck, Michigan
6:00pm (EDT)	Rodriguez 26'; Harish (yellow card) 54'; Navarro (yellow card) 77'; Wier (yellow card) 80'; Irwin (yellow card) 90'	NISA Report; FotMob Report; Broadcast	Saydee (yellow card) 16'; Lawson 65'; Peterson 85'	Attendance: 0 Referee: Nicole Green
Note: Game was played behind closed doors due to the COVID-19 pandemic

=== Player statistics ===
As of September 16, 2020

==== Top goalscorers ====
Rank	Player	Club	Goals
1	(Brazil) Zeca Ferraz	Chattanooga FC	3
2	(Montenegro) Bljedi Bardic	New York Cosmos	2
2	(United States) Matthew Fondy	Oakland Roots SC	2
2	(Guatemala) Darwin Lom	Chattanooga FC	2
2	(United States) Kyle Nuel	Michigan Stars	2
2	(United States) Connor Rutz	Detroit City FC	2
7	14 players tied		1

==== Clean sheets ====
Rank	Player	Club	Clean sheets
1	(Zimbabwe) Tatenda Mkuruva	Michigan Stars	2
1	(United States) Alec Redington	Chattanooga FC	2
1	(United States) Nathan Steinwascher	Detroit City FC	2
4	(Haiti) Jean Antoine	Detroit City FC	1
4	(United States) Steven Barrera	California United Strikers FC	1
4	(United States) Jesse Corke	New York Cosmos	1
4	(United States) Brandon Gomez	Los Angeles Force	1
4	(Mexico) Christian Herrera	Oakland Roots SC	1
4	(United States) Parker Siegfried	Detroit City FC	1

== Spring season ==
The league saw an increase in the number of teams compared to the Fall season, with both San Diego 1904 FC and Stumptown Athletic returning from hiatus, and Maryland Bobcats FC joining as an expansion team. Meanwhile, Oakland Roots SC left the league in order to take part in USL Championship and the New York Cosmos went on hiatus due to the COVID-19 pandemic.

The Spring season started on April 13, 2021, with a bubble tournament named the NISA Legends Cup and hosted by Chattanooga FC, with the winner gaining entry into the Spring 2021 Final. Phase 2 began on May 1, 2021 and was a traditional regular season hosted in each team's markets. The highest finishing team in the table will face the winner of the Legends Cup in the Spring 2021 Final to determine the Spring champion.

=== NISA Legends Cup ===
The 9 teams were split into three groups of three teams. The best team at the end of the group stage qualified directly to the Legends Cup final, while the second and third seeds played a semifinal game to determine the second finalist.

==== Group 1 ====
Home \ Away	MAR	MIC	SDG
Maryland Bobcats FC	—	1–1	1–2
Michigan Stars FC		—	1–1
San Diego 1904 FC			—

Source: nisasoccer.com
Legend: Blue = home team win; Yellow = draw; Red = away team win.

==== Group 2 ====
Home \ Away	CAL	DET	STU
California United Strikers FC	—	0–0	1–1
Detroit City FC		—	2–0
Stumptown AC			—

Source: nisasoccer.com
Legend: Blue = home team win; Yellow = draw; Red = away team win.

==== Group 3 ====
Home \ Away	CHA	LAF	NAM
Chattanooga FC	—	4–1	3–0
Los Angeles Force		—	3–2
New Amsterdam FC			—

Source: nisasoccer.com
Legend: Blue = home team win; Yellow = draw; Red = away team win.

=== Overall standings ===
Pos	Team	Pld	W	D	L	GF	GA	GD	Pts	Qualification
1	Chattanooga FC	2	2	0	0	7	1	+6	6	Advance to Legends Cup final
2	Detroit City FC	2	1	1	0	2	0	+2	4	Advance to Legends Cup semifinal
3	San Diego 1904 FC	2	1	1	0	3	2	+1	4	Advance to Legends Cup semifinal
4	Los Angeles Force	2	1	0	1	4	6	−2	3	
5	Michigan Stars FC	2	0	2	0	2	2	0	2	
6	California United Strikers FC	2	0	2	0	1	1	0	2	
7	Maryland Bobcats FC	2	0	1	1	2	3	−1	1	
8	Stumptown AC	2	0	1	1	1	3	−2	1	
9	New Amsterdam FC	2	0	0	2	2	6	−4	0	

Source: nisasoccer.com
Rules for classification: 1) points; 2) goal differential; 3) goals scored; 4) head to head; 5) goals allowed; 6) coin toss

==== Knock-out round ====
Semifinals; April 22, 2021			Finals; April 25, 2021
			1	Chattanooga FC	0
2	**Detroit City FC**	**1**	2	**Detroit City FC**	**3**
3	San Diego 1904 FC	0

Bold = winner
* = after extra time, ( ) = penalty shootout score

April 22, 2021 Semi-final	**Detroit City**	**1–0**	**SD 1904**	Chattanooga, Tennessee
20:00 EDT	Todd (yellow card) 33'; Carroll 43'; Rodriguez (yellow card) 90'	Report	Barrios (yellow card) 84'	Stadium: Finley Stadium

April 25, 2021 Final	**Chattanooga FC**	**0–3**	**Detroit City**	Chattanooga, Tennessee
20:00 EDT	McGrath (yellow card) 50'	Report	Lewis 11'; Todd 34'; Venegas 90+4'	Stadium: Finley Stadium

==== Other Matches ====
Team 1	Score	Team 2
8 - **Stumptown AC**	1–0	New Amsterdam FC - 9
6 - **California United Strikers FC**	3–2	Maryland Bobcats FC - 7
4 - Los Angeles Force	0–2	**Michigan Stars FC** - 5

=== Phase 2 ===
==== Standings ====
Pos	Team	Pld	W	D	L	GF	GA	GD	Pts	Qualification
1	Detroit City FC (Y, X)	8	6	2	0	14	3	+11	20	Advance to season final
2	Los Angeles Force	8	6	0	2	11	6	+5	18	Advance to spring final (Note: If either 2020 Fall Champion Detroit or 2021 Legends Cup runner-up Chattanooga finish the spring season in first place, or both teams finish in the top two, the spot in the spring final will go to the next best team.)
3	Stumptown AC	8	4	3	1	8	4	+4	15	
4	California United Strikers FC	8	4	1	3	12	10	+2	13	
5	Maryland Bobcats FC	8	3	2	3	9	8	+1	11	
6	Chattanooga FC (Z)	8	2	2	4	6	8	−2	8	Advance to spring final
7	San Diego 1904 FC	8	2	1	5	8	17	−9	7	
8	Michigan Stars FC	8	1	2	5	5	12	−7	5	
9	New Amsterdam FC	8	1	1	6	5	10	−5	4	

Source: nisasoccer.com
Rules for classification: 1) points; 2) goal differential; 3) goals scored; 4) head to head; 5) goals allowed; 6) coin toss
(X) Spring Legends Cup champion; (Y) Fall Champion, qualifies for season final; (Z) Spring Legends Cup runner-up, qualifies for spring final

==== Results ====
Home \ Away	CAL	CHA	DET	LAF	MAR	MIC	NAM	SDG	STU
California United Strikers FC	—	1–0	0–3			3–0		3–1	
Chattanooga FC		—			0–0	2–1	2–0		0–1
Detroit City FC		2–1	—	3–0	1–0				0–0
Los Angeles Force	2–1	2–0		—			2–0	0–1	
Maryland Bobcats FC	2–1			0–2	—			3–1	1–2
Michigan Stars FC			1–1	1–2	1–3	—	1–0		
New Amsterdam FC	1–2		0–1		0–0		—		0–1
San Diego 1904 FC		1–1	1–3			1–0	1–4	—	
Stumptown AC	1–1			0–1		0–0		3–1	—

Source: NISAOfficial.com
Legend: Blue = home team win; Yellow = draw; Red = away team win.

==== Player statistics ====
As of June 26, 2021

===== Top goalscorers =====
Rank	Player	Club	Goals
1	(United States) Christian Chaney	Los Angeles Force	6
2	(Sierra Leone) James Sesay	Maryland Bobcats FC	5
3	(Mexico) Pato Botello Faz	Detroit City FC	4
4	(United States) Diego Barrera	Los Angeles Force	3
4	(England) Alex McGrath	Stumptown AC	3
6	(United States) Kay Banjo	Maryland Bobcats FC	2
6	(United States) Jimmy Filerman	Detroit City FC	2
6	(Mexico) Luis Garcia Sosa	Stumptown AC	2
6	(England) Billy Garton Jr.	California United Strikers FC	2
6	(Grenada) Shavon John-Brown	New Amsterdam FC	2
6	(United States) Tony López	California United Strikers FC	2
6	(United States) Anthony Manning	Detroit City FC	2
6	(United States) Ian McGrath	Chattanooga FC	2
6	(United States) Kyle Nuel	Michigan Stars FC	2
6	(Mexico) Omar Nuño	California United Strikers FC	2
6	(United States) César Romero	San Diego 1904 FC	2
6	(United States) Connor Rutz	Detroit City FC	2
6	(Spain) Alexander Satrústegui	Michigan Stars FC	2
6	(United States) Christian Thierjung	California United Strikers FC	2
6	(Scotland) Max Todd	Detroit City FC	2
6	(United States) Travis Ward	Stumptown AC	2

===== Clean sheets =====
Rank	Player	Club	Clean sheets
1	(United States) Nathan Steinwascher	Detroit City FC	8
2	(United States) Brandon Gomez	Los Angeles Force	6
2	(United States) Kevin Gonzalez	Stumptown AC	6
4	(Sierra Leone) Christian Caulker	Maryland Bobcats FC	4
5	(United States) Alec Redington	Chattanooga FC	3
6	(United States) Steven Barrera	California United Strikers FC	2
6	(United States) Misha Marson	San Diego 1904 FC	2
6	(Zimbabwe) Tatenda Mkuruva	Michigan Stars	2
6	(United States) Mitch North	California United Strikers FC	2
6	(Colombia) Kevin Tenjo	New Amsterdam FC	2

=== Playoffs ===
Originally, the NISA Legends Cup champion and the highest finishing team in Phase 2 were scheduled to play in the 2021 NISA Spring Championship at Keyworth Stadium on June 30 with the winner advancing to the 2020–21 Season Championship match three days later. However, since Detroit City FC won the Legends Cup and finished atop the Spring table the match simply became a semifinal between the runners-up of each competition.

June 30, 2021	**Chattanooga FC**	**2–3**	**Los Angeles Force**	Hamtramck, Michigan
19:30 EDT	Naglestad 31', 47' (pen.); Robertson (yellow card) 82'; Russell (red card) 88'; McGrath (yellow card) 90+4'	Report; Broadcast	McLaughlin (yellow card) 47'; Chaney 57', (yellow card) 90+2'; Ocegueda 70'; Barrera (yellow card) 78'; Gordillo 83'; Villon (red card) 87'	Stadium: Keyworth Stadium; Attendance: >100; Referee: Jeremy Scheer
Note: Report missing yellow cards from Barrera and Tate but they are shown on broadcast, Russell's red card is misattributed to Richard Dixon, LA's starting XI lists Kashani when it was actually Villatoro, Goñi was subbed into the match in the 54th minute and is shown on stream. Following the match, both red cards issued to Russell and Villon were downgraded to yellow cards.

== Championship match ==
Detroit City FC, the winner of the Fall season, hosted semifinal winner Los Angeles Force in the inaugural NISA Championship match on July 3, 2021.

July 3, 2021	Detroit City FC	1–0	Los Angeles Force	Hamtramck, Michigan
19:30 EDT	McLaughlin 62' (o.g.); Botello Faz (yellow card) 73'	Report; Broadcast	Gordillo (yellow card) 30'; Moran (Ast. Coach) (yellow card) 69' (yellow-red card) 90+6'; Villatoro (yellow card) 70'; Pérez (yellow card) 74'; Barrera (yellow card) 79'; Goñi (yellow card) 84'; Chaney (yellow card) 90+2'	Stadium: Keyworth Stadium; Attendance: 7,231; Referee: Gustavo Solorio
Note: Moran cards not shown on report but seen on stream including post-match, Goñi sub and yellow card not reported but seen on broadcast, report lists Villatoro twice on Force starting XI instead of Villon

== See also ==
- National Independent Soccer Association
