= Women's Independent Soccer League =

Women's American soccer league

- Founded: April 8, 2021; 5 years ago
- First season: 2024
- Country: United States
- Confederation: CONCACAF (North American Football Union)
- Level on pyramid: 2
- Website: wisleague.com

The Women's Independent Soccer League (WISL) is a planned professional women's soccer league in the United States. The league was announced officially on April 8, 2021, and expected to serve as a second division. In September 2023, the WISL announced it had applied for Division II sanctioning from the United States Soccer Federation ahead of a planned six-team shortened 2024 season, with 5 additional clubs committed to beginning play in a full-length season the following year. However, as of February 2025, this is the most recent communication regarding the league, and it has not yet begun play, leaving its future unclear.

== Teams ==
Team	Location	Stadium	Capacity	Joined	Head coach
Los Angeles Force	Los Angeles, California	TBC	TBC	2022	TBD

== League Leadership ==
Name	Years	Title	Ref.
Lynn Berling-Manuel	2021–?	Managing Director	
Josh Prutch	2021–?	EVP Expansion	
