= Abraham Torres Nilo =

Mexican footballer (born 1992)

Personal information
- Full name: Abraham de Jesus Torres Nilo
- Date of birth: 13 August 1992 (age 34)
- Place of birth: Leon, Guanajuato Mexico
- Height: 1.87 m (6 ft 1 1/2 in)
- Position: Centre back

Team information
- Current team: Los Angeles Force
- Number: 13

Youth career
- Pachuca

Senior career*
Years	Team	Apps	(Gls)
–2013	Pachuca II		
2012	→ Titanes de Tulancingo (loan)		
2013–2014	Linces de Tlaxcala		
2014–2015	Tlaxcala		
2015–2017	Potros UAEM	38	(2)
2017–2018	Mineros de Zacatecas	18	(0)
2018	Zacatepec	3	(0)
2019	Potros UAEM	7	(0)
2019	Correcaminos UAT	3	(0)
2020–	Los Angeles Force	2	(0)
- * Club domestic league appearances and goals as of 15 October 2020

Abraham de Jesús Torres Nilo (born August 13, 1992) is a Mexican professional footballer who currently plays for Los Angeles Force in the National Independent Soccer Association. He made his professional debut with Pachuca during a scoreless Copa MX draw against Atlante on 29 August 2012.
