= Joseph Patrick Pérez =

American soccer player

Joseph Pérez
Personal information
- Full name: Joseph Patrick Pérez Mancilla
- Date of birth: June 9, 1997 (age 29)
- Place of birth: Anaheim, California, U.S.
- Height: 5 ft 9 in (1.75 m)
- Position: Defender

Youth career
- 2015–2019: Puebla

Senior career*
Years	Team	Apps	(Gls)
2018–2019	Puebla	0	(0)
2018	→ Las Vegas Lights (loan)	7	(0)
2020	San Diego 1904	2	(1)
2021	Los Angeles Force	17	(0)
2022	Cal United Strikers	8	(0)
2023–2024	Chattanooga FC	50	(0)
2025	Tormenta FC	3	(0)
- * Club domestic league appearances and goals as of November 1, 2025

Joseph Patrick Pérez Mancilla (born June 9, 1997), known as Joseph Pérez, is an American professional soccer player who plays as a defender.

== Club career ==
In July 2018, Pérez was loaned to the Las Vegas Lights of the United Soccer League during the team's inaugural season.

In February 2020, Pérez was signed by San Diego 1904 FC of the National Independent Soccer Association for its Spring 2020 season. He made his debut on February 29 on the road against Stumptown Athletic and scored his first professional goal in the 36th minute.

In March 2021, Pérez joined Los Angeles Force ahead of the 2021 season.

Pérez signed with USL League One club Tormenta FC in January 2025.
