= Christian Chaney =

American soccer player (born 1994)

Personal information
- Full name: Christian Eric Chaney
- Date of birth: September 8, 1994 (age 32)
- Place of birth: Fresno, California, United States
- Height: 6 ft 2 in (1.88 m)
- Position: Forward

Team information
- Current team: Corpus Christi
- Number: 9

College career
Years	Team	Apps	(Gls)
2011–2014	Fresno City Rams		

Senior career*
Years	Team	Apps	(Gls)
2012	Club Deportivo de los Altos		
2015–2016	Fresno Fuego	26	(16)
2016	Ararat Yerevan	1	(0)
2016–2017	Sacramento Republic	9	(0)
2018–2019	Fresno FC	48	(10)
2020	Mosta	6	(1)
2020	Charlotte Independence	6	(0)
2021	Los Angeles Force	22	(11)
2022	Central Valley Fuego	27	(10)
2023–2024	Forward Madison	48	(16)
2025	Charlotte Independence	30	(12)
2026–	Corpus Christi	6	(0)
- * Club domestic league appearances and goals as of October 31, 2026

Christian Eric Chaney (born September 8, 1994) is an American soccer player who currently plays for USL League One club Corpus Christi.

== Career ==
Chaney played college soccer at Fresno City College between 2011 and 2014. In the summer of 2012, Chaney played with Mexican side C.D. De los Altos as an amateur player. Chaney has also played with Premier Development League side Fresno Fuego, where was a candidate for the League MVP in 2016, after scoring 13 goals in 12 appearances.

After appearing in a friendly for Fresno Fuego against Armenian side Ararat Yerevan, Chaney was signed by the Armenian Premier League club.

Chaney returned to the United States when he signed with United Soccer League club Sacramento Republic on August 12, 2016. In September 2016, Chaney appeared for San Jose Earthquakes in a friendly match against C.F. Pachuca.

Chaney signed with newly hometown USL club Fresno FC on December 6, 2017. Following a stint in Malta with Mosta F.C., Chaney returned to the United States on August 20, 2020, joining USL side Charlotte Independence.

Chaney returned to Fresno on January 27, 2022, signing with USL League One expansion club Central Valley Fuego.

Prior to the 2023 season, Chaney moved to fellow USL League One side Forward Madison FC.

On March 12, 2025, Chaney was announced as a new signing for USL League One side Charlotte Independence.

== Career statistics ==
=== Club ===
As of November 9, 2024.

Club	Season	League			Playoffs		Domestic Cup		League Cup		Total	
Club	Season	Division	Apps	Goals	Apps	Goals	Apps	Goals	Apps	Goals	Apps	Goals
FC Ararat Yerevan	2015–16	Armenian Premier League	1	0	–		0	0	–		1	0
Sacramento Republic FC	2016	United Soccer League	0	0	–		0	0	–		0	0
Sacramento Republic FC	2017	United Soccer League	9	0	–		3	0	–		12	0
Sacramento Republic FC	Total		9	0	0	0	3	0	0	0	12	0
Fresno FC	2018	United Soccer League	30	7	–		1	0	–		31	8
Fresno FC	2019	USL Championship	18	3	1	1	1	0	–		20	3
Fresno FC	Total		48	10	1	1	2	0	0	0	51	11
Mosta F.C.	2019–20	Maltese Premier League	6	1	–		1	0	–		7	1
Charlotte Independence	2020	USL Championship	6	0	1	0	0	0	–		7	0
Los Angeles Force	Spring 2021	National Independent Soccer Association	7	5	2	1	–		–		9	6
Los Angeles Force	Fall 2021	National Independent Soccer Association	15	6	–		–		–		15	6
Los Angeles Force	Total		22	11	2	1	0	0	0	0	24	12
Central Valley Fuego FC	2022	USL League One	27	10	–		2	1	–		29	11
Forward Madison FC	2023	USL League One	30	10	1	1	1	0	–		32	11
Forward Madison FC	2024	USL League One	18	6	2	0	1	2	9	4	30	12
Forward Madison FC	Total		48	16	3	1	2	2	9	4	62	23
Career total			167	48	7	3	10	3	9	4	193	58
