= Samuel Goñi =

Spanish footballer

Personal information
- Full name: Samuel Goñi Villava
- Date of birth: 10 February 1994 (age 32)
- Place of birth: Marcilla, Spain
- Height: 1.75 m (5 ft 9 in)
- Position: Forward

Youth career
- 2010–2011: Osasuna

College career
Years	Team	Apps	(Gls)
2014–2015	Bethel Wildcats	34	(26)
2016–2018	Cal State Fullerton Titans	43	(15)

Senior career*
Years	Team	Apps	(Gls)
2011	Osasuna B	1	(0)
2015–2017	Chattanooga		
2018	Golden State Force	10	(12)
2018–2020	Celaya	1	(0)
2020–2021	Peña Sport	21	(7)
2021–	Los Angeles Force	15	(4)
- * Club domestic league appearances and goals as of 6 April 2022

Samuel Goñi Villava (born 10 February 1994) is a footballer from Marcilla in Spain. He played as a forward for Los Angeles Force in the National Independent Soccer Association in the year 2021 where he emerged the Southwest Region Golden boot recipient under the FC Golden State Force for 9 goals scored at the end of the season.

== Career statistics ==
=== Club ===
As of 30 May 2021.

Club	Season	League			Cup		Other		Total	
Club	Season	Division	Apps	Goals	Apps	Goals	Apps	Goals	Apps	Goals
Osasuna B	2010–11	Segunda División B	1	0	–		0	0	1	0
Golden State Force	2018	PDL	10	12	3 (Note: Appearances in the U.S. Open Cup)	1	1 (Note: Appearances in the USL League Two playoffs)	0	14	13
Celaya	2018–19	Ascenso MX	1	0	0	0	0	0	1	0
Celaya	2019–20	Ascenso MX	0	0	3 (Note: Appearances in the Copa Mexico)	0	0	0	3	0
Celaya	Total		1	0	3	0	0	0	4	0
Peña Sport	2020–21	Tercera División	21	7	0	0	0	0	21	7
Career total			33	19	6	1	1	0	40	20
