= Cristian Gordillo =

Mexican footballer (born 1990)

Personal information
- Full name: Cristian Gordillo Moreno
- Date of birth: February 22, 1990 (age 36)
- Place of birth: Mexico City, Mexico
- Height: 1.75 m (5 ft 9 in)
- Position: Forward

Senior career*
Years	Team	Apps	(Gls)
2007–2012	Monarcas Morelia	64	(10)
2010	→ Mérida FC (loan)	8	(1)
2011	→ Atlante UTN (loan)	5	(0)
2012	Bravos de Nuevo Laredo	10	(3)
2012	Reynosa F.C.	15	(2)
2013	Delfines	6	(0)
2013–2016	Atlético San Luis	21	(2)
2014–2015	→ Club Necaxa (loan)	2	(0)
2015–2016	→ Celaya (loan)	21	(2)
2016–2017	Juárez	14	(3)
2018–2019	California United FC II		
2019	California United Strikers		
2019–2020	Orange County FC 2		
2020–2021	Los Angeles Force	4	(0)
- * Club domestic league appearances and goals as of April 19, 2021

Cristian Gordillo (born February 22, 1990) is a Mexican professional footballer who currently plays for Los Angeles Force in the National Independent Soccer Association.

== Career ==
On August 8, 2019, California United Strikers FC signed Gordillo prior to their first season in the National Independent Soccer Association. Prior to this he played for the Strikers' United Premier Soccer League side, California United FC II, between Spring 2018 and Spring 2019. In February 2019, Gordillo and the team won the UPSL Fall Season National Championship over Inocentes FC.

In November 2019, UPSL side Orange County FC 2 announced they had signed Gordillo.
