= Diego Barrera =

American soccer player (born 1987)

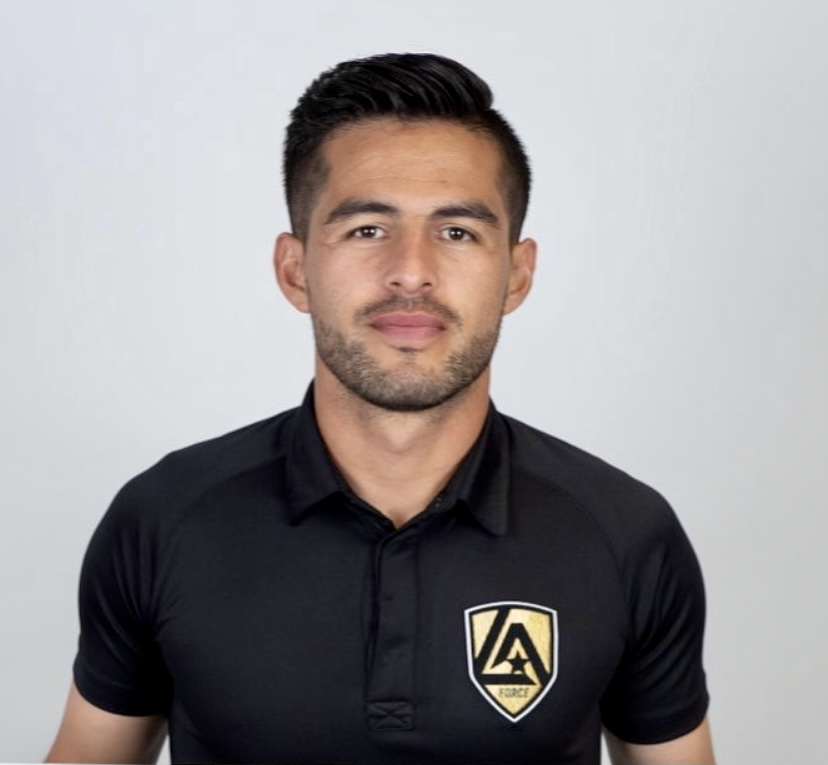

Personal information
- Full name: Diego Alejandro Barrera
- Date of birth: March 25, 1987 (age 39)
- Place of birth: Bogotá, Colombia
- Height: 5 ft 8 in (1.73 m)
- Positions: Midfielder; forward

College career
Years	Team	Apps	(Gls)
2004–2006	Loyola Marymount Lions		
2007	New Mexico Lobos		

Senior career*
Years	Team	Apps	(Gls)
2006	San Fernando Valley Quakes	4	(1)
2007	Ventura County Fusion	8	(0)
2008	San Fernando Valley Quakes	13	(4)
2009–2010	Hollywood United Hitmen	11	(1)
2010	Ventura County Fusion	2	(1)
2011	Wilmington Hammerheads	12	(0)
2011–2012	Syracuse Silver Knights (indoor)	13	(3)
2012	Cal FC		
2013	Stallion Sta. Lucia F.C.	9	(1)
2014	Team Socceroo	13	(7)
2015–2016	Kaya FC	12	(8)
2016–2017	Kasem Bundit University FC	46	(28)
2018	Phitsanulok F.C.	9	(6)
2019	Pathumthani University F.C.	22	(14)
2021–2022	Los Angeles Force	18	(9)

International career
2005	United States U18		
- * Club domestic league appearances and goals as of 16 September 2021—2022

Diego Barrera (born March 25, 1987) is an American soccer player. Born in Colombia, Barrera represented the United States at a youth level.

== Career ==
=== College and amateur ===
Barrera was born in Bogotá, Colombia. His family moved to California when he was ten. Later he attended Thousand Oaks High School, and played three years of college soccer at Loyola Marymount University, where he was named to the College Soccer News All-Freshman Third Team, the All-WCC second team and the WCC All-Freshman Team in his debut year in 2004. He transferred to the University of New Mexico prior to his senior year in 2007.

During his college career and beyond, Barrera played extensively with numerous Southern California teams in the USL Premier Development League, including the San Fernando Valley Quakes (twice), Hollywood United Hitmen and Ventura County Fusion (twice). He also made a Walmart TV commercial for the Fifa World Cup year 2010 Mom Knows Walmart

=== Professional ===
Barrera signed his first professional contract in March 2011, joining USL Pro club Wilmington Hammerheads. He made his professional debut on May 14, 2011, coming on as a second-half substitute in a 3–1 win over F.C. New York.

After the season at Wilmington, he played professional indoor soccer with the Syracuse Silver Knights in the MISL, before returning to California. Barrera then joined his home town based team, amateur side Cal FC in the USASA-affiliated La Gran Liga de Oxnard based in Oxnard, California.

Year 2013 he signed his first contract in the Philippines with the first division team STALLION FC and won the United Football League Division One Championship. He then transferred to team Soccoroo for the second quarter of 2014 and was loaned by KAYA FC for the UFL CUP 2014. In year 2015 KAYA FC signed him and made a big contribution. KAYA FC won their first championship in CUP 2015.

In the following year, 2016 he signed a 4-year contract to play in Bangkok, Thailand and he made a huge contribution that awarded him as the 2016 BEST PLAYER OF THE YEAR. In the year 2016, he was also the Top Goalscorer with 17 goals and 14 assists in 22 games played as a consistent starting lineup player.

In January 2021, Barrera moved back to the United States of America and signed into the California club Los Angeles Force. He scored two goals, and one assist in the first game and became the captain of the club. Barrera became the top player and made the first team of all seasons. He retired in June 2023 and started his own soccer academy training school business.

== Personal ==
Diego Barrera is married to Eva Barrera (m.2014).

Diego's younger brother, Danny Barrera, is also a professional soccer player.

== Honors ==
=== Club ===
Stallion

- UFL Division 1: 2013
