= Los Angeles Force =

Professional soccer club in California, United States

- Full name: Los Angeles Force
- Nickname: LA Force
- Founded: 2019; 7 years ago
- Stadium: St. Anthony High School Athletic Field
- Owner: Bob Friedland
- Head Coach: Dekel Keinan
- League: NISA
- 2025: Champions
- Website: losangelesforce.com
Home colors	Away colors

Los Angeles Force is an American professional soccer club based in the Greater Los Angeles area, that plays in the National Independent Soccer Association (NISA). The club is affiliated with NISA Nation side FC Golden State Force.

== History ==
On August 2, 2019, the National Independent Soccer Association announced the addition of Los Angeles Force ahead of the league's inaugural 2019 Fall Showcase. Los Angeles finished the Fall Showcase with a record of 3 wins, 2 draws, and 1 loss, losing to California United Strikers FC in the West Coast Championship on penalty kicks. The 2020 Spring season would be suspended, and eventually cancelled, due to the COVID-19 pandemic.

The Force returned to play in the 2020 Fall season, going 0-1-1 in the regional stage, but 2-0-1 in the Group stage. The team would lose 1-0 to eventual champion Detroit City FC in the semifinals. In the Spring season, finished with a record of 6 wins, 0 draws, and 2 losses, second in the NISA. Los Angeles forward Christian Chaney lead the league in scoring with 6 goals. In the postseason, the Force defeated Chattanooga FC in the semifinals by a score of 3-2. In the Championship Final, the Los Angeles Force lost to Detroit City FC 1-0 when Force defender Seamus McLaughlin scored an own goal while attempting to pass the ball back to keeper Brandon Gomez.

On October 19, 2024, the Force hosted 405 derby rivals Irvine Zeta FC in the 2024 NISA Championship at Veterans Memorial Stadium, with an attendance of 1,477. The Los Angeles Force opened the scoring in the 26th minute thanks to Josue Cartagena, but Irvine found an equalizer in the 55th minute through George Almeida. After 90 minutes and the score at 1-1, the game went to extra time with no one scoring within extra time. In penalties, the Los Angeles Force beat Irvine Zeta 3-2 in penalties, with goalkeeper Seth Torman saving the first two Zeta penalties, crowning the Los Angeles Force the 2024 NISA Champions, the first for the club.

Los Angeles Force was the fifth club confirmed for the 2025 NISA Pro Cup. The Force went 2-0-1 in the Group Stage, defeating Northern Colorado Hailstorm FC in the Knockout Round, and beating Capo FC in the finals, 4-1 in extra time. Forward Joel Quist led the tournament with five goals, earning the Golden Boot and Golden Ball for the tournament.

The Los Angeles Force were announced as one of six teams participating in the 2026 NISA Nation Fall season, with plans to return to professional play in 2027.

== Stadium ==
For the 2019 NISA Fall Showcase, the team played its home matches at Rio Hondo College in Whittier, California. Starting with the 2020 Spring season, the team moved to Los Angeles, and is using the newly renovated stadium on the campus of California State University - Los Angeles.

During the 2021 fall season, the Force primarily used Valley High School's facility in Santa Ana, except for two matches at Championship Soccer Stadium in Irvine. For the 2022 season, the Force used 6 different stadiums, including Championship Stadium (1 match, plus another at Great Park's turf field 10 adjacent), one match at Garey High School in Pomona, one at Yates Field in Chino, two at Covina District Field in Covina, and 4 at LA Harbor College's stadium.

During the 2023 season, the Force primarily used Championship Soccer Stadium in Irvine.

In 2024, the Force announced that they will be playing at Veterans Memorial Stadium at Long Beach City College.

Ahead of the 2026 NISA Nation Fall Season, it was announced that the Force would play their home games at St. Anthony High School's Athletic Field in Long Beach.

== Players and staff ==
=== Roster ===
As of December 22, 2024

Note: Flags indicate national team as defined under FIFA eligibility rules; some limited exceptions apply. Players may hold more than one non-FIFA nationality.

No.	Pos.	Nation	Player
2	DF	USA	Erick Villatoro
3	DF	USA	Aydan Bowers
4	DF	USA	Garrett Hogbin
6	DF	USA	Ronaldo Lomeli
7	MF	USA	Justin Jovel
8	MF	USA	Alex Juarez
9	FW	BLZ	Michael Salazar
10	MF	USA	Beto Alvarenga
11	FW	USA	Moja Hale
12	FW	USA	Dante Brigida
13	GK	USA	Sebastian Ascencio
16	MF	USA	Ronaldo Pineda
17	MF	USA	Josue Cartagena

No.	Pos.	Nation	Player
18	FW	COL	Victor Blanco
19	FW	MEX	José Montes de Oca
20	FW	USA	Oscar Delgado
21	DF	ISR	Dekel Keinan
23	MF	USA	Bryan Ortega
24	FW	CMR	Ayuk Tambe
25	FW	USA	Joel Quist
28	DF	USA	Ahmed Shaibu Jr.
29	DF	USA	Alex Thompson-Hill
30	GK	USA	Seth Torman
44	FW	JPN	Mouhamadou War
77	MF	USA	Josue España
80	DF	USA	Ivan Hernandez

=== Staff ===
As of December 22, 2024

Executive Staff

Robert Friedland - Owner, President

Alex Lujan - Vice President, General Manager

Logan Dahler - Assistant General Manager, Director of Soccer Operations

Coaching Staff

Dekel Keinan - Head Coach

Juan Carlos Garcia - Assistant Coach

Kris Guerra - Goalkeeper Coach

Support Staff

Kuvaal Patel - Team Administrator

Leo Freese - Team Manager

== Statistics and records ==
=== Season-by-season ===
Season	League	Div	P	W	D	L	GF	GA	Pts	Position	Playoffs	U.S. Open Cup	NISA Independent Cup	Top Scorer	
2019–20	NISA	Fall	6	3	2	1	8	7	14	1st, West Coast	Conference Final	Cancelled	N/A	(United States) Alvaro Madrigal-Zavala (Colombia) Marvin Merlano	2
2019–20	NISA	Spring	2	0	1	1	1	3	1	7th	Cancelled	Cancelled	N/A	(United States) Alvaro Madrigal-Zavala (Colombia) Marvin Merlano	2
2020–21	NISA	Fall	3	2	0	1	5	5	6	1st, Group B	Fall Semifinials	Cancelled	N/A	(United States) Christian Chaney	6
2020–21	NISA	Spring	8	6	0	2	11	6	18	2nd	Spring Final	Cancelled	N/A	(United States) Christian Chaney	6
Fall 2021	NISA		18	7	9	2	20	14	30	3rd	N/A	Cancelled	Champions (West Coast Region)	(United States) Christian Chaney	6
2022	NISA		11	2	4	5	7	14	10	7th*	DNQ	Round 2	Champions (West Coast Region)	(United States) Edwin Rivas Jr.	5
2023	NISA		24	13	5	6	33	21	44	3rd	Quarterfinals	Round 2	Champions (Pacific Region)	(United States) Francis Avoce	7
2024	NISA		18	14	2	2	40	12	44	1st, West Conference	Final, Champions	Round 2	Champions (West Region)	(United States) Bryan Ortega (Belize) Michael Salazar	3

*In the 2022 NISA season, from March 26-August 27, Los Angeles Force finished 4th in the West Division. After the withdrawal of Bay Cities FC from NISA, the league changed the format from two divisions to an 8 team table, where the Los Angeles Force finished 7th.

== Honors ==
=== Team ===
- NISA
  - League Champions (2): 2024, 2025
  - Independent Cup Champions (4): Fall 2021, 2022, 2023, 2024

=== Player ===
Honor	Player Name	Season
NISA Golden Glove	Seth Torman	2024
NISA Pro Cup Golden Boot	Joel Quist	2025
NISA Pro Cup Golden Ball	Joel Quist	2025
