= 2019–20 Michigan Stars FC season =

Michigan Stars FC
2019–20 NISA season
- Manager: George Juncaj
- Head coach: Alexander Strehmel
- Stadium: Ultimate Soccer Arenas; Pontiac, Michigan
- NISA: Fall: N/A; Spring: 8th
- Playoffs: Fall: N/A; Spring: N/A
- U.S. Open Cup: Cancelled
- Top goalscorer: League: Travis Ward (1); All: Travis Ward (1)
- Biggest defeat: 1 goal: 1–0 (February 29 vs. Cal United); 2–1 (March 7 vs. Oakland)

The 2019–20 Michigan Stars FC season was the club's first season playing in the National Independent Soccer Association, a newly established third division soccer league in the United States, and first professional season.

== Overview ==
Michigan Stars FC was admitted into the National Independent Soccer Association on September 23, 2019 and latter fully accepted by the U.S. Soccer Federation on December 11, 2019, and will start competing in the 2020 Spring season. The team will play its home matches at a temporary outdoor venue at the Ultimate Soccer Arenas in Pontiac, Michigan, the same complex the team used during the 2019 NPSL season and Members Cup tournament where it played indoors.

On April 27, 2020, following a stoppage of play and subsequent extension due to the COVID-19 pandemic, NISA announced the cancellation of the 2020 Spring season.

== Club ==
=== Roster ===
As of March 11, 2020.

No.	Pos.	Nat.	Name	Date of birth (age)	Since
1	GK	(Iran)	Arshia Aghababazadeh	November 5, 1995 (age 29)	2020
2	DF	(United States)	Tekodah Lobsiger	February 14, 1995 (age 30)	2020
3	DF	(Israel)	Gonnie Ben-Tal	July 24, 1995 (age 29)	2019
4	DF	(United States)	Robert Juncaj	October 15, 2001 (age 23)	2019
5	DF	(Liberia)	Joseph Aidoo	August 24, 1995 (age 29)	2019
6	MF	(Cameroon)	Remy Tazifor	March 5, 1995 (age 30)	2019
7	MF	(United States)	Steven Juncaj	March 8, 1998 (age 27)	2019
8	MF	(Bosnia and Herzegovina)	Zanin Mahic	June 19, 1992 (age 33)	2020
9	MF	(Serbia)	Nenad Markovic	June 11, 1993 (age 32)	2020
10	FW	(United States)	Kyle Nuel (captain)	July 2, 1993 (age 32)	2019
11	FW	(United States)	Travis Ward	May 9, 1996 (age 29)	2020
12	GK	(United States)	Sergio Orozco	April 9, 1994 (age 31)	2020
14	FW	(Spain)	Alexander Satrústegui	January 1, 1994 (age 31)	2020
15	DF	(Venezuela)	Andrés Chalbaud	December 26, 1994 (age 30)	2020
16	GK	(Zimbabwe)	Tatenda Mkuruva	January 4, 1996 (age 29)	2019
17	DF	(France)	Alexandre Frank	August 1, 1995 (age 29)	2020
19	DF	(United States)	Cameron Schneider	April 21, 1997 (age 28)	2020
20	MF	(Latvia)	Nils Valdmanis	August 8, 1997 (age 27)	2020
21	MF	(United States)	Zachary Reynolds	February 15, 1994 (age 31)	2020
22	DF	(United States)	Adil Gowani	June 2, 1994 (age 31)	2020
23	DF	(United States)	Patrick Sullivan	August 25, 1994 (age 30)	2019
25	DF	(England)	James Abraham	September 17, 1993 (age 31)	2019
26	DF	(Barbados)	Terence Smith	September 23, 1991 (age 33)	2020
29	FW	(United States)	James Pipe	March 18, 1996 (age 29)	2020
31	MF	(United States)	Jannik Eckenrode	December 13, 1993 (age 31)	2020

=== Coaching staff ===
Name	Position
(Germany) Alexander Strehmel	Head coach

== Transfers ==
=== Transfers In ===
Date from	Position	Player	Last team	Type	Ref.
February 19, 2020	MF	(United States) Steven Juncaj	Michigan Stars FC (NPSL)	Free transfer	
February 19, 2020	GK	(Zimbabwe) Tatenda Mkuruva	Michigan Stars FC (NPSL)	Free transfer	
February 19, 2020	DF	(England) James Abraham	Michigan Stars FC (NPSL)	Free transfer	
February 20, 2020	MF	(Cameroon) Remy Tazifor	Michigan Stars FC (NPSL)	Free transfer	
February 20, 2020	DF	(Israel) Gonnie Ben-Tal	Michigan Stars FC (NPSL)	Free transfer	
February 20, 2020	DF	(Liberia) Joseph Aidoo	Michigan Stars FC (NPSL)	Free transfer	
February 20, 2020	DF	(Cameroon) Robert Juncaj	Michigan Stars FC (NPSL)	Free transfer	
February 20, 2020	FW	(United States) Kyle Nuel	Michigan Stars FC (NPSL)	Free transfer	
February 20, 2020	DF	(United States) Patrick Sullivan	Michigan Stars FC (NPSL)	Free transfer	
February 20, 2020	FW	(United States) Travis Ward	Greenville Triumph SC	Free transfer	
February 20, 2020	DF	(United States) Cameron Schneider	Philadelphia Fury	Free transfer	
February 20, 2020	MF	(Bosnia and Herzegovina) Zanin Mahic	East Bay FC Stompers	Free transfer	
February 21, 2020	GK	(Iran) Arshia Aghababazadeh	Los Angeles Force	Free transfer	
February 21, 2020	GK	(United States) Sergio Orozco	Unattached	Free transfer	
February 21, 2020	DF	(United States) Adil Gowani	Atlanta SC	Free transfer	
February 21, 2020	MF	(United States) Zachary Reynolds	(Sweden) Säffle FF	Free transfer	
February 21, 2020	DF	(Venezuela) Andrés Chalbaud	AFC Ann Arbor	Free transfer	
February 22, 2020	MF	(Serbia) Nenad Markovic	St. Mary's Rattlers	Free transfer	
February 22, 2020	MF	(Latvia) Nils Valdmanis	Kalamazoo FC	Free transfer	
February 22, 2020	DF	(France) Alexandre Frank	Western Mass Pioneers	Free transfer	
February 22, 2020	FW	(Spain) Alexander Satrústegui	Atlantic City FC	Free transfer	
February 22, 2020	DF	(Barbados) Terence Smith	Unattached	Free transfer	
February 22, 2020	DF	(United States) Tekodah Lobsiger	Orange County FC	Free transfer	
February 22, 2020	FW	(United States) James Pipe	Unattached	Free transfer	

== Friendlies ==
January 25, 2020 Preseason	Sarasota Metropolis FC (USL2)	v	Michigan Stars FC	Lakewood Ranch, Florida
12:00 EDT		Report		Stadium: The Premier Sports Campus at Lakewood Ranch
Note: Result not published.

February 19, 2020 Preseason	Sporting Detroit SC (UPSL)	v	Michigan Stars FC	Wixom, Michigan
9:30 EDT		Report		Stadium: Total Sports Complex
Note: Result not published.

== Competitions ==
=== NISA Fall season ===
Michigan did not take part in the 2019 NISA Fall season. On September 23, the NISA Board of Governors announced the team had been accepted into the league but would not begin full league play until Spring 2020.

=== NISA Spring season ===
Details for the 2020 NISA Spring season were announced January 27, 2020.

==== Standings ====
Pos	Team	Pld	W	D	L	GF	GA	GD	Pts	Qualification
1	Oakland Roots SC	2	1	1	0	3	2	+1	4	Playoffs
2	California United Strikers FC (Q)	2	1	1	0	1	0	+1	4	Playoffs
3	Detroit City FC	1	1	0	0	2	0	+2	3	Playoffs
4	Stumptown Athletic	2	0	2	0	3	3	0	2	Playoffs
5	San Diego 1904 FC	2	0	2	0	2	2	0	2	
6	Chattanooga FC	1	0	1	0	1	1	0	1	
7	Los Angeles Force	2	0	1	1	1	3	−2	1	
8	Michigan Stars FC	2	0	0	2	1	3	−2	0	

Updated to match(es) played on March 8, 2020. Source: NISAofficial.com
(Q) Qualified for the phase indicated

==== Results summary ====
Overall								Home						Away					
Pld	W	D	L	GF	GA	GD	Pts	W	D	L	GF	GA	GD	W	D	L	GF	GA	GD
2	0	0	2	1	3	−2	0	0	0	0	0	0	0	0	0	2	1	3	−2

Last updated: 7 March 2020.
Source: Match reports

==== Matches ====
February 29, 2020 1	California United Strikers FC	1–0	Michigan Stars FC	Irvine, California
7:00 p.m.	Jeon 59'	Report; MyCujoo Broadcast	Reynolds (yellow card) 7'; Sullivan (yellow card) 23'; Schneider (yellow card) 82'	Stadium: Championship Soccer Stadium; Attendance: 2,258; Referee: William Randy Hoffman

March 7, 2020 2	Oakland Roots SC	2–1	Michigan Stars FC	Oakland, California
5:10 p.m.	Harish (yellow card) 16'; Littleton (yellow card) 45'; McInerney 75' (pen.); Garuba 82'; Attakora (yellow card) 88'	MyCujoo Broadcast	Mahic (yellow card) 12'; Schneider (yellow card) 63'; Ward 89'	Stadium: Laney College; Attendance: 4,873

March 14, 2020 3	Chattanooga FC	P–P	Michigan Stars FC	Chattanooga, Tennessee
3:00 p.m.				Stadium: Finley Stadium
Note: On March 12, NISA announced that it would be suspending its season 30 days due to the COVID-19 pandemic

March 21, 2020 4	Michigan Stars FC	P–P	Los Angeles Force	Pontiac, Michigan
8:00 p.m.				Stadium: Ultimate Soccer Arenas Outdoor Stadium
Note: On March 12, NISA announced that it would be suspending its season 30 days due to the COVID-19 pandemic

March 28, 2020 5	Detroit City FC	P–P	Michigan Stars FC	Hamtramck, Michigan
2:00 p.m.				Stadium: Keyworth Stadium
Note: On March 12, NISA announced that it would be suspending its season 30 days due to the COVID-19 pandemic

April 4, 2020 6	Michigan Stars FC	P–P	California United Strikers FC	Pontiac, Michigan
7:30 p.m.				Stadium: Ultimate Soccer Arenas Outdoor Stadium
Note: On March 12, NISA announced that it would be suspending its season 30 days due to the COVID-19 pandemic

April 11, 2020 7	Stumptown Athletic	P–P	Michigan Stars FC	Pineville, North Carolina
7:04 p.m.				Stadium: CSA OrthoCarolina Sportsplex
Note: On March 30, NISA announced that it would be extending its suspension of play to May 10 in accordance with CDC guidelines for COVID-19

April 18, 2020 8	San Diego 1904 FC	P–P	Michigan Stars FC	San Diego, California
7:04 p.m.				Stadium: Lincoln High School
Note: On March 30, NISA announced that it would be extending its suspension of play to May 10 in accordance with CDC guidelines for COVID-19

May 2, 2020 9	Michigan Stars FC	P–P	Oakland Roots SC	Pontiac, Michigan
7:00 p.m.				Stadium: Ultimate Soccer Arenas Outdoor Stadium
Note: On March 30, NISA announced that it would be extending its suspension of play to May 10 in accordance with CDC guidelines for COVID-19

May 9, 2020 10	Michigan Stars FC	P–P	Stumptown Athletic	Pontiac, Michigan
7:00 p.m.				Stadium: Ultimate Soccer Arenas Outdoor Stadium
Note: On March 30, NISA announced that it would be extending its suspension of play to May 10 in accordance with CDC guidelines for COVID-19

May 17, 2020 11	Michigan Stars FC	P–P	San Diego 1904 FC	Pontiac, Michigan
7:00 p.m.				Stadium: Ultimate Soccer Arenas Outdoor Stadium
Note: On April 28, NISA announced the cancellation of the 2020 Spring season due to COVID-19

May 23, 2020 12	Michigan Stars FC	P–P	Detroit City FC	Pontiac, Michigan
7:00 p.m.				Stadium: Ultimate Soccer Arenas Outdoor Stadium
Note: On April 28, NISA announced the cancellation of the 2020 Spring season due to COVID-19

May 29, 2020 13	Michigan Stars FC	P–P	Chattanooga FC	Pontiac, Michigan
7:00 p.m.				Stadium: Ultimate Soccer Arenas Outdoor Stadium
Note: On April 28, NISA announced the cancellation of the 2020 Spring season due to COVID-19

June 5, 2020 14	Los Angeles Force	P–P	Michigan Stars FC	Los Angeles, California
7:30 p.m.				Stadium: Jesse Owens Stadium
Note: On April 28, NISA announced the cancellation of the 2020 Spring season due to COVID-19

=== U.S. Open Cup ===
Michigan will enter the 2020 U.S. Open Cup with the rest of the National Independent Soccer Association teams in the Second Round. It was announced on January 29 that their first opponent would be USL Championship side Indy Eleven.

April 8 Second Round	Indy Eleven (USLC) (Indiana)	P–P	Michigan Stars FC (NISA)	Indianapolis, Indiana
7:00 pm EDT				Stadium: Carroll Stadium
Note: On March 13, U.S. Soccer’s Open Cup Committee announced the tournament would be temporarily suspended due to the COVID-19 pandemic

== Squad statistics ==
As of Match played March 7, 2020

=== Appearances and goals ===
No.	Pos	Nat	Player	Total		Spring Season		U.S. Open Cup	
No.	Pos	Nat	Player	Apps	Goals	Apps	Goals	Apps	Goals
Goalkeepers
1	GK	(Iran) IRN	Arshia Aghababazadeh	2	0	2	0	-	-
12	GK	(United States) USA	Sergio Orozco	0	0	0	0	-	-
16	GK	(Zimbabwe) ZIM	Tatenda Mkuruva	0	0	0	0	-	-
Defenders
2	DF	(United States) USA	Tekodah Lobsiger	1	0	1	0	-	-
3	DF	(Israel) ISR	Gonnie Ben-Tal	2	0	2	0	-	-
4	DF	(United States) USA	Robert Juncaj	0	0	0	0	-	-
5	DF	(Liberia) LBR	Joseph Aidoo	2	0	2	0	-	-
15	DF	(Venezuela) VEN	Andrés Chalbaud	2	0	2	0	-	-
17	DF	(France) FRA	Alexandre Frank	0	0	0	0	-	-
19	DF	(United States) USA	Cameron Schneider	2	0	2	0	-	-
22	DF	(United States) USA	Adil Gowani	0	0	0	0	-	-
23	DF	(United States) USA	Patrick Sullivan	2	0	2	0	-	-
25	DF	(England) ENG	James Abraham	0	0	0	0	-	-
26	DF	(Barbados) BRB	Terence Smith	0	0	0	0	-	-
Midfielders
6	MF	(Cameroon) CMR	Remy Tazifor	0	0	0	0	-	-
7	MF	(United States) USA	Steven Juncaj	2	0	2	0	-	-
8	MF	(Bosnia and Herzegovina) BIH	Zanin Mahic	2	0	2	0	-	-
9	MF	(Serbia) SRB	Nenad Markovic	0	0	0	0	-	-
20	MF	(Latvia) LVA	Nils Valdmanis	2	0	2	0	-	-
21	MF	(United States) USA	Zachary Reynolds	2	0	2	0	-	-
31	MF	(United States) USA	Jannik Eckenrode	1	0	1	0	-	-
Forwards
10	FW	(United States) USA	Kyle Nuel	2	0	2	0	-	-
11	FW	(United States) USA	Travis Ward	2	1	2	1	-	-
14	FW	(Spain) ESP	Alexander Satrústegui	0	0	0	0	-	-
29	FW	(United States) USA	James Pipe	0	0	0	0	-	-

=== Goal scorers ===
Place	Position	Nation	Number	Name	Spring Season	U.S. Open Cup	Total
1	FW	(United States)	11	Travis Ward	1	-	1

=== Disciplinary record ===
Number	Nation	Position	Name	Spring Season		U.S. Open Cup		Total	
Number	Nation	Position	Name	Booked	Sent off (straight red)	Booked	Sent off (straight red)	Booked	Sent off (straight red)
8	(Bosnia and Herzegovina)	MF	Zanin Mahic	1	0	-	-	1	0
19	(United States)	DF	Cameron Schneider	2	0	-	-	2	0
21	(United States)	MF	Zachary Reynolds	1	0	-	-	1	0
23	(United States)	DF	Patrick Sullivan	1	0	-	-	1	0

== See also ==
- 2019–20 NISA season
