= 2020–21 Michigan Stars FC season =

Michigan Stars FC
2020–21 NISA season
- Manager: George Juncaj
- Head coach: Alexander Strehmel
- Stadium: Fall: Ultimate Soccer Arenas; Pontiac, Michigan; Spring: Romeo High School; Washington, Michigan
- NISA: Fall: Eastern Conf: 2nd Spring: 7th
- Playoffs: Fall: Group stage Spring: Did not qualify
- Legends Cup: 5th place
- U.S. Open Cup: Did not qualify
- Top goalscorer: League: Kyle Nuel: 4 All: Kyle Nuel: 5
- Highest home attendance: 2,837 (May 22 vs. DCFC)
- Biggest win: NAFC 0–3 MSFC (Sept. 12)
- Biggest defeat: CAL 3–0 MSFC (May 16)
Home colours	Away colours

The 2020–21 Michigan Stars FC season was the club's second season playing in the third division National Independent Soccer Association and first full professional season.

== Club ==
=== Roster ===
As of April 19, 2021.

No.	Pos.	Nat.	Name	Date of birth (age)	Since
1	GK	(United States)	Micah Bledsoe	September 26, 1994 (age 31)	2021
2	DF	(United States)	Tekodah Lobsiger	February 14, 1995 (age 31)	2020
3	MF	(United States)	Grant Elgin	April 2, 1997 (age 28)	2021
4	DF	(United States)	Robert Juncaj	October 15, 2001 (age 24)	2019
5	DF	(Liberia)	Joseph Aidoo	August 24, 1995 (age 30)	2019
6	FW	(El Salvador)	Bernardo Majano	December 9, 1993 (age 32)	2021
7	MF	(United States)	Steven Juncaj	March 8, 1998 (age 27)	2019
8	DF	(United States)	Brian Vang	March 17, 1998 (age 27)	2020
9	FW	(United States)	Waleed Cherif	January 31, 1998 (age 28)	2021
10	FW	(United States)	Kyle Nuel (captain)	July 2, 1993 (age 32)	2019
11	MF	(United States)	Bryant Nardizzi	April 9, 1998 (age 27)	2021
12	GK	(United States)	Colin Coppola Sneddon	December 23, 1995 (age 30)	2021
13	FW	(United States)	Tom Suchecki	September 9, 1997 (age 28)	2021
14	FW	(Spain)	Alexander Satrústegui	January 1, 1994 (age 32)	2020
15	DF	(Venezuela)	Andrés Chalbaud	December 26, 1994 (age 31)	2020
16	GK	(Zimbabwe)	Tatenda Mkuruva	January 4, 1996 (age 30)	2019
17	MF	(United States)	Jay Lee	July 8, 1998 (age 27)	2021
20	DF	(Japan)	Yuki Shibata	January 15, 1998 (age 28)	2021
21	MF	(United States)	Zachary Reynolds	February 15, 1994 (age 32)	2020
23	DF	(United States)	Carl Schneider	November 19, 1992 (age 33)	2021
25	DF	(England)	James Abraham	September 17, 1993 (age 32)	2019
30	DF	(United States)	Devon Amoo-Mensah	November 27, 1995 (age 30)	2020

=== Coaching staff ===
Name	Position
(Germany) Alexander Strehmel	Head coach

== Transfers ==
=== Transfers In ===
Date from	Position	Player	Last team	Type	Ref.
July 23, 2020	DF	(United States) Devon Amoo-Mensah	Lewis University	Free transfer	
July 23, 2020	DF	(Chile) Tomas Bernedo	Dayton Dutch Lions	Free transfer	
July 24, 2020	DF	(United States) Brian Vang	University of Wisconsin–Green Bay	Free transfer	
July 24, 2020	DF	(United States) Sebastien Des Pres	Orange County SC	Free transfer	
April 6, 2021	DF	(United States) Carl Schneider	Forward Madison FC	Free transfer	
April 6, 2021	FW	(United States) Waleed Cherif	Duquesne Dukes	Free transfer	
April 7, 2021	FW	(United States) Tom Suchecki	Stumptown Athletic	Free transfer	
April 7, 2021	MF	(United States) Jay Lee	Free Agent	Free transfer	
April 7, 2021	FW	(El Salvador) Bernardo Majano	Virginia United FC	Free transfer	
April 8, 2021	MF	(United States) Grant Elgin	Northeastern Huskies	Free transfer	
April 8, 2021	MF	(United States) Bryant Nardizzi	Framingham State Rams	Free transfer	
April 12, 2021	GK	(United States) Colin Coppola Sneddon	UC Santa Barbara Gauchos	Free transfer	
April 12, 2021	GK	(United States) Micah Bledsoe	Stumptown Athletic	Free transfer	
May 2021	DF	(Japan) Yuki Shibata	(Montenegro) FK Ibar	Free transfer	

=== Transfers Out ===
Date to	Position	Player	Next team	Type	Ref.
	MF	(Bosnia and Herzegovina) Zanin Mahic]	Free agent	Released	
	MF	(Serbia) Nenad Markovic	Free agent	Released	
	MF	(Latvia) Nils Valdmanis	Free agent	Released	
November 2020	GK	(Iran) Arshia Aghababazadeh	Free agent	Not re-signed	
November 2020	DF	(Israel) Gonnie Ben-Tal	Free agent	Not re-signed	
November 2020	DF	(Chile) Tomas Bernedo	Free agent	Not re-signed	
November 2020	DF	(United States) Sebastien Des Pres	Free agent	Not re-signed	
November 2020	MF	(United States) Jannik Eckenrode	Free agent	Not re-signed	
November 2020	MF	(France) Alexandre Frank	Free agent	Not re-signed	
November 2020	DF	(United States) Adil Gowani	Free agent	Not re-signed	
November 2020	GK	(United States) Sergio Orozco	Free agent	Not re-signed	
November 2020	FW	(United States) James Pipe	Free agent	Not re-signed	
November 2020	DF	(United States) Cameron Schneider	Free agent	Not re-signed	
November 2020	DF	(Barbados) Terence Smith	Free agent	Not re-signed	
November 2020	DF	(United States) Patrick Sullivan	Free agent	Not re-signed	
November 2020	MF	(Cameroon) Remy Tazifor	Free agent	Not re-signed	
November 2020	FW	(United States) Travis Ward	Stumptown AC	Not re-signed	

== Friendlies ==
June 24, 2020 Preseason	Michigan Stars FC	v	Inter Detroit (UPSL)	Washington, Michigan
7:00 PM EDT		Broadcast		Stadium: Total Sports Park
Note: Result not published.

July 22, 2020 Preseason	Michigan Stars FC	2–0	Livonia City FC (MPL)	Washington, Michigan
7:00 PM EDT		Report		Stadium: Total Sports Park

July 25, 2020 Preseason	Michigan Stars FC	v	LK St. Clair Soccer (MPL)	Washington, Michigan
7:00 PM EDT		Report		Stadium: Total Sports Park
Note: Result not published.

December 8, 2020 Friendly	Michigan Stars FC	2–1	Metro Louisville FC (NPSL)	Washington, Michigan
6:00 p.m. EST		Report		Stadium: Total Sports Park

March 3, 2021 Preseason	Metro Louisville FC (NPSL)	2–3	Michigan Stars FC	Jeffersonville, Indiana
7:00 p.m. EST		Match Broadcast		Stadium: Woehrle Athletic Complex

April 3, 2021 Preseason	Michigan Stars FC	2–1	Panathinaikos Chicago (NPSL)	Washington, Michigan
5:00 p.m. EDT		Stars Report; Chicago Report		Stadium: Michigan Stars Sport Center

== Competitions ==
=== NISA Fall season ===
On June 4, NISA announced the initial details for the 2020 Fall Season with the member teams split into conferences, Eastern and Western.

Details for the Fall regular season were announced on July 31, 2020. The Stars will take part as a member of the Eastern Conference.

==== Standings ====
Pos	Team	Pld	W	D	L	GF	GA	GD	Pts
1	Chattanooga FC	4	3	0	1	8	3	+5	9
2	Michigan Stars FC	4	2	2	0	6	2	+4	8
3	New York Cosmos	4	1	2	1	5	4	+1	5
4	Detroit City FC	4	1	2	1	3	2	+1	5
5	New Amsterdam FC	4	0	0	4	1	12	−11	0

Source: NISAofficial.com

==== Results summary ====
Overall								Home						Away					
Pld	W	D	L	GF	GA	GD	Pts	W	D	L	GF	GA	GD	W	D	L	GF	GA	GD
4	2	2	0	6	2	+4	8	1	1	0	2	1	+1	1	1	0	4	1	+3

Last updated: September 12, 2020.
Source: Match reports

==== Matches ====
August 8, 2020 Week 1	Michigan Stars FC	2–1	Chattanooga FC	Pontiac, Michigan
7:00 p.m. EDT	Nuel 6', (yellow card) 39'; Aidoo (yellow card) 26'; S. Juncaj 88', (yellow card) 88'; Aghababazadeh (yellow card) 90+4'	NISA Report; Stars Report; Broadcast	Hernandez (yellow card) 50'; McGrath 59' (pen.); Carr (yellow card) 90+1'	Stadium: Ultimate Soccer Arenas Outdoor Stadium; Attendance: 0
Note: Game was played behind closed doors due to the COVID-19 pandemic

August 15, 2020 Week 2	New York Cosmos	1–1	Michigan Stars FC	Uniondale, New York
7:00 p.m. EDT	Szetela (yellow card) 53'; Bardic 72'	NISA Report; FotMob Report; Broadcast	Bernedo (yellow card) 45'; Reynolds 90+2'	Stadium: Mitchel Athletic Complex; Attendance: 0
Note: Game was played behind closed doors due to the COVID-19 pandemic

August 22, 2020 Week 3	Michigan Stars FC	0–0	Detroit City FC	Pontiac, Michigan
7:00 p.m. EDT	Satrústegui (yellow card) 44'	NISA Report; Detroit News Report; Broadcast	Jirira (yellow card) 27'; Kafari (red card) 57'	Stadium: Ultimate Soccer Arenas Outdoor Stadium; Attendance: 0
Note: Game was played behind closed doors due to the COVID-19 pandemic

September 12, 2020 Week 4	New Amsterdam FC	0–3	Michigan Stars FC	Warwick, New York
6:00 p.m. EDT	Esche (yellow card) 45+1'; Bedoya (yellow card) 49'; Vicente (yellow card) 70'; Alvarez (yellow card) 89'	NISA Report; FotMob Report; Broadcast	Ben-Tal 6', (yellow card) 6'; Nuel 45+4'; Reynolds (yellow card) 52'; S. Juncaj (yellow card) 81'; Sullivan (yellow card) 90'; Bernedo 90+4'	Stadium: Hudson Sports Complex; Attendance: 0
Note: Game was played behind closed doors due to the COVID-19 pandemic

=== Fall Playoffs ===
All eight NISA teams qualified for the 2020 Fall tournament, which will be hosted at Keyworth Stadium in Detroit, Michigan, beginning on September 21 ending with the final on October 2.

==== Group stage ====
Pos	Team	Pld	W	D	L	GF	GA	GD	Pts	Qualification
1	Oakland Roots SC	3	2	0	1	5	2	+3	6	Advance to semifinals
2	Detroit City FC	3	2	0	1	6	5	+1	6	Advance to semifinals
3	Michigan Stars FC	3	1	1	1	4	3	+1	4	
4	New Amsterdam FC	3	0	1	2	4	9	−5	1	

Source: NISAofficial.com
Rules for classification: 1) Points, 2) Goal differential, 3) Goals scored, 4) Head-to-head record, 5) Coin toss

September 21, 2020 Group stage	Michigan Stars FC	2–0	Detroit City FC	Hamtramck, Michigan
5:00 p.m. EDT	Ben-Tal 52'; Bernedo 58'; Vang (yellow card) 82'	NISA Report; FotMob Report; Broadcast	Clegg (yellow card) 44'	Stadium: Keyworth Stadium; Attendance: 0 Referee: Nicole Green
Note: Game was played behind closed doors due to the COVID-19 pandemic

September 24, 2020 Group stage	Michigan Stars FC	2–2	New Amsterdam FC	Hamtramck, Michigan
8:00 p.m. EDT	Satrústegui (yellow card) 21' (yellow-red card) 23'; Ben-Tal 45'; Tazifor (red card) 53'; S. Juncaj (yellow card) 90+6'	NISA Report; FotMob Report; Broadcast	Vicente 35', (yellow card) 45+1'; Williams (yellow card) 37'; Bello 63'; Bartley (yellow card) 75'; Nastu (yellow card) 90+4'	Stadium: Keyworth Stadium; Attendance: 0 Referee: Kevin Fikar
Note: Game was played behind closed doors due to the COVID-19 pandemic

September 27, 2020 Group stage	Oakland Roots SC	1–0	Michigan Stars FC	Hamtramck, Michigan
5:00 p.m. EDT	Kim 3'; Abidor (yellow card) 59'	NISA Report; FotMob Report; Broadcast	Mkuruva (yellow card) 90+5'	Stadium: Keyworth Stadium; Attendance: 0 Referee: Carter Brochu
Note: Game was played behind closed doors due to the COVID-19 pandemic

=== 2021 Spring Season ===
==== NISA Legends Cup ====
NISA announced initial spring season plans in early February 2021, including starting the season with a tournament in Chattanooga, Tennessee with a standard regular season to follow. The tournament, now called the NISA Legends Cup, was officially announced on March 10 and is scheduled to run between April 13 and 25. All nine NISA members teams taking part in the Spring were divided into three team groups and played a round robin schedule. The highest placing group winner automatically qualified for the tournament final, while the second and third highest finishing teams overall played one-another in a semifinal to determine a second finalist.

The Stars were drawn into Group 1 alongside the debuting Maryland Bobcats FC and the returning San Diego 1904 FC.

===== Standings =====
Pos	Team	Pld	W	D	L	GF	GA	GD	Pts	Qualification
1	Chattanooga FC	2	2	0	0	7	1	+6	6	Advance to Legends Cup final
2	Detroit City FC	2	1	1	0	2	0	+2	4	Advance to Legends Cup semifinal
3	San Diego 1904 FC	2	1	1	0	3	2	+1	4	Advance to Legends Cup semifinal
4	Los Angeles Force	2	1	0	1	4	6	−2	3	
5	Michigan Stars FC	2	0	2	0	2	2	0	2	
6	California United Strikers FC	2	0	2	0	1	1	0	2	
7	Maryland Bobcats FC	2	0	1	1	2	3	−1	1	
8	Stumptown AC	2	0	1	1	1	3	−2	1	
9	New Amsterdam FC	2	0	0	2	2	6	−4	0	

Source: nisasoccer.com
Rules for classification: 1) points; 2) goal differential; 3) goals scored; 4) head to head; 5) goals allowed; 6) coin toss

===== Group 1 results =====
Home \ Away	MAR	MIC	SDG
Maryland Bobcats FC	—	1–1	1–2
Michigan Stars FC		—	1–1
San Diego 1904 FC			—

Source: nisasoccer.com
Legend: Blue = home team win; Yellow = draw; Red = away team win.

===== Matches =====
April 13, 2021 Group 2 Round 1	Michigan Stars FC	1–1	San Diego 1904 FC	Chattanooga, Tennessee
12:00 p.m. EDT	Abraham (yellow card) 29'; Satrústegui 60'; Vang (yellow card) 67'; Aidoo (yellow card) 85' (yellow-red card) 90+3'	Report; Broadcast	Lara (yellow card) 8'; Cutler (yellow card) 45+1'; Espinoza 90+4' (pen.)	Stadium: Finley Stadium; Referee: Andrew Musashe

April 19, 2021 Group 2 Round 2	Michigan Stars FC	1–1	Maryland Bobcats FC	Chattanooga, Tennessee
8:00 p.m. EDT	Aidoo (yellow card) 41', (goal) 79'; Nuel (yellow card) 52'; Majano (yellow card) 83'; Mkuruva (yellow card) 83'	Report; Broadcast	Fane (yellow card) 20'; Banjo 85' (Pen.)	Stadium: Finley Stadium

April 22, 2021	#4 Los Angeles Force	0–2	#5 Michigan Stars FC	Chattanooga, Tennessee
5:00 p.m. EDT	Gordillo (yellow card) 62'	Report; Broadcast	Suchecki 52'; Nuel 78'	Stadium: Finley Stadium; Referee: Matthew Thompson

==== Regular season ====
The Spring Season schedule was announced on March 18 with each association member playing eight games, four home and four away, in a single round-robin format.

===== Standings =====
Pos	Team	Pld	W	D	L	GF	GA	GD	Pts	Qualification
1	Detroit City FC (Y, X)	8	6	2	0	14	3	+11	20	Advance to season final
2	Los Angeles Force	8	6	0	2	11	6	+5	18	Advance to spring final (Note: If either 2020 Fall Champion Detroit or 2021 Legends Cup runner-up Chattanooga finish the spring season in first place, or both teams finish in the top two, the spot in the spring final will go to the next best team.)
3	Stumptown AC	8	4	3	1	8	4	+4	15	
4	California United Strikers FC	8	4	1	3	12	10	+2	13	
5	Maryland Bobcats FC	8	3	2	3	9	8	+1	11	
6	Chattanooga FC (Z)	8	2	2	4	6	8	−2	8	Advance to spring final
7	San Diego 1904 FC	8	2	1	5	8	17	−9	7	
8	Michigan Stars FC	8	1	2	5	5	12	−7	5	
9	New Amsterdam FC	8	1	1	6	5	10	−5	4	

Source: nisasoccer.com
Rules for classification: 1) points; 2) goal differential; 3) goals scored; 4) head to head; 5) goals allowed; 6) coin toss
(X) Spring Legends Cup champion; (Y) Fall Champion, qualifies for season final; (Z) Spring Legends Cup runner-up, qualifies for spring final

===== Results summary =====
Overall								Home						Away					
Pld	W	D	L	GF	GA	GD	Pts	W	D	L	GF	GA	GD	W	D	L	GF	GA	GD
8	1	2	5	5	12	−7	5	1	1	2	4	6	−2	0	1	3	1	6	−5

Last updated: June 25, 2021.
Source: Match reports

===== Matches =====
May 1, 2021 Week 1	Michigan Stars FC	1–0	New Amsterdam FC	Washington, Michigan
7:00 p.m. EDT	S. Juncaj 50'; Mkuruva (yellow card) 90+5'	Report; Broadcast		Stadium: Romeo High School Stadium
Note: Missed subs from report: MSFC = Majano in for Abraham (46'), Chalbaud in for Lobsiger (71'), Lee in for Satrústegui (83'), Elgin in for Reynolds (86')/NAFC = Malango in for Vicente (58'), Preciado in for Mikaheel (75')

May 8, 2021 Week 2	Chattanooga FC	2–1	Michigan Stars FC	Chattanooga, Tennessee
7:30 p.m. EDT	Hoffstatter (yellow card) 35'; Russell (yellow card) 76'; Jones 80'; Naglestad 90+7' (Pen); Bement (red card) 90+7'	NISA Report; Chattanooga Report; Broadcast	Satrústegui 64'; Nuel (yellow card) 90+3'; Amoo-Mensah (yellow card) 90+5'; Aidoo (yellow card) 90+5'; Tazifor (Asst. coach) (red card) 90+7'	Stadium: Finley Stadium; Attendance: 2,329; Referee: Rashawn Clark
Note: An altercation following the match resulted in the suspension of three player and one Michigan Stars' assistant coach

May 16, 2021 Week 3	California United Strikers FC	3–0 (Forfeit)	Michigan Stars FC	Irvine, California
4:00 p.m. PDT		Report		Stadium: Championship Stadium
Note: On May 14 the Michigan Stars announced it would not play that weekend's match against the California United Strikers due to unresolved issues with NISA. Later that day the association announced the game would be ruled a forfeit with Cal receiving a 3-0 walkover and all three points in the spring table.

May 22, 2021 Week 4	Michigan Stars FC	1–1	Detroit City FC	Washington, Michigan
7:00 p.m. EDT	Reynolds (yellow card) 38'; Nuel 87' (Pen)	Report; Broadcast	Saydee 50'	Stadium: Romeo High School Stadium; Attendance: 2,837; Referee: Ernie Constantine
Note: Bernardo Majano was subbed into the game for Carl Schneider in the 64th minute, the report incorrectly states Remy Tazifor came in (who is no longer on the roster)

May 29, 2021 Week 5	San Diego 1904 FC	1–0	Michigan Stars FC	Chula Vista, California
7:00 p.m. PDT	Ramirez 2'; Almubaslat (yellow card) 72'; Espinoza (yellow card) 90+2'	Report; Broadcast	Chalbaud (yellow card) 32'; Reynolds (yellow card) 43'	Stadium: Chula Vista Elite Athlete Training Center; Referee: Brendon Gardner

June 5, 2021 Week 6	Michigan Stars FC	1–2	Los Angeles Force	Washington, Michigan
7:00 p.m. EDT	Satrústegui 63'; Aidoo (yellow card) 77'; Amoo-Mensah (yellow card) 90+1'	Report	Barrera 2'; Chaney 4'; McLaughlin (yellow card) 50'	Stadium: Michigan Stars Sport Center; Referee: Gustavo Solorio

June 19, 2021 Week 7	Michigan Stars FC	1–3	Maryland Bobcats FC	Washington, Michigan
7:00 p.m. EDT	Nuel 90' (Pen)	Report; Broadcast	Argueta 68'; Sesay 70', 80'	Stadium: Romeo High School Stadium

June 25, 2021 Week 8	Stumptown AC	0–0	Michigan Stars FC	Matthews, North Carolina
7:00 p.m. EDT	Williams (yellow card) 42'	Report; Broadcast	Schneider (yellow card) 45+1'; Abraham (yellow card) 71'	Stadium: Sportsplex at Matthews; Referee: Nicole Green

=== U.S. Open Cup ===
As a team playing in a recognized professional league, Michigan would normally be automatically qualified for the U.S. Open Cup. However, with the 2021 edition shorted due to the COVID-19 pandemic, NISA has only been allotted 1 to 2 teams spots. On March 29, U.S. Soccer announced 2020 Fall Champion Detroit City FC as NISA's representative in the tournament.

== Squad statistics ==
As of Match played June 25, 2021

=== Appearances and goals ===
No.	Pos	Nat	Player	Total		Fall Season		Fall Playoffs		Legends Cup		Spring Season	
No.	Pos	Nat	Player	Apps	Goals	Apps	Goals	Apps	Goals	Apps	Goals	Apps	Goals
Goalkeepers
1	GK	(United States) USA	Micah Bledsoe	1	0	-	-	-	-	0+0	0	1+0	0
12	GK	(United States) USA	Colin Coppola Sneddon	0	0	-	-	-	-	0+0	0	0+0	0
16	GK	(Zimbabwe) ZIM	Tatenda Mkuruva	16	0	4+0	0	3+0	0	3+0	0	6+0	0
Defenders
2	DF	(United States) USA	Tekodah Lobsiger	16	0	0+3	0	0+3	0	3+0	0	7+0	0
4	DF	(United States) USA	Robert Juncaj	2	0	0+0	0	0+0	0	0+1	0	1+0	0
5	DF	(Liberia) LBR	Joseph Aidoo	17	1	4+0	0	3+0	0	3+0	1	7+0	0
8	DF	(United States) USA	Brian Vang	9	0	3+0	0	1+1	0	0+3	0	0+1	0
15	DF	(Venezuela) VEN	Andrés Chalbaud	17	0	4+0	0	3+0	0	0+3	0	4+3	0
20	DF	(Japan) JPN	Yuki Shibata	2	0	-	-	-	-	-	-	0+2	0
23	DF	(United States) USA	Carl Schneider	9	0	-	-	-	-	3+0	0	5+1	0
25	DF	(England) ENG	James Abraham	16	0	4+0	0	3+0	0	3+0	0	6+0	0
30	DF	(United States) USA	Devon Amoo-Mensah	17	0	4+0	0	3+0	0	3+0	0	7+0	0
Midfielders
3	MF	(United States) USA	Grant Elgin	1	0	-	-	-	-	0+0	0	0+1	0
7	MF	(United States) USA	Steven Juncaj	16	3	4+0	1	3+0	1	3+0	0	6+0	1
11	MF	(United States) USA	Bryant Nardizzi	3	0	-	-	-	-	0+1	0	0+2	0
17	MF	(United States) USA	Jay Lee	2	0	-	-	-	-	0+1	0	0+1	0
21	MF	(United States) USA	Zachary Reynolds	15	0	2+2	0	1+0	0	3+0	0	7+0	0
Forwards
6	FW	(El Salvador) SLV	Bernardo Majano	7	0	0+0	0	0+0	0	1+0	0	2+4	0
9	FW	(United States) USA	Waleed Cherif	3	0	-	-	-	-	1+1	0	1+0	0
10	FW	(United States) USA	Kyle Nuel	16	5	3+0	2	3+0	0	3+0	1	7+0	2
13	FW	(United States) USA	Tom Suchecki	8	1	-	-	-	-	1+2	1	5+0	0
14	FW	(Spain) ESP	Alexander Satrústegui	15	3	1+2	0	3+0	0	3+0	1	5+1	2
Left during season
1	GK	(Iran) IRN	Arshia Aghababazadeh	0	0	0+0	0	0+0	0	-	-	-	-
3	DF	(Israel) ISR	Gonnie Ben-Tal	7	3	2+2	1	3+0	2	-	-	-	-
6	MF	(Cameroon) CMR	Remy Tazifor	2	0	0+0	0	0+2	0	-	-	-	-
9	DF	(Chile) CHI	Tomas Bernedo	7	2	2+2	1	3+0	1	-	-	-	-
11	FW	(United States) USA	Travis Ward	0	0	0+0	0	0+0	0	-	-	-	-
12	GK	(United States) USA	Sergio Orozco	0	0	0+0	0	0+0	0	-	-	-	-
17	DF	(France) FRA	Alexandre Frank	0	0	0+0	0	0+0	0	-	-	-	-
19	DF	(United States) USA	Cameron Schneider	6	0	4+0	0	0+2	0	-	-	-	-
20	DF	(United States) USA	Sebastien Des Pres	5	0	3+1	0	1+0	0	-	-	-	-
22	DF	(United States) USA	Adil Gowani	0	0	0+0	0	0+0	0	-	-	-	-
23	DF	(United States) USA	Patrick Sullivan	2	0	0+1	0	0+1	0	-	-	-	-
26	DF	(Barbados) BRB	Terence Smith	1	0	0+1	0	0+0	0	-	-	-	-
29	FW	(United States) USA	James Pipe	1	0	0+0	0	0+1	0	-	-	-	-
31	MF	(United States) USA	Jannik Eckenrode	0	0	0+0	0	0+0	0	-	-	-	-

=== Goal scorers ===
Place	Position	Nation	Number	Name	Fall Season	Fall Playoffs	Legends Cup	Spring Season	Total
1	FW	(United States)	10	Kyle Nuel	2	0	1	2	5
2	DF	(Israel)	3	Gonnie Ben-Tal	1	2	-	-	3
2	MF	(United States)	7	Steven Juncaj	1	1	0	1	3
2	FW	(Spain)	14	Alexander Satrústegui	0	0	1	2	3
3	DF	(Chile)	9	Tomas Bernedo	1	1	-	-	2
4	DF	(Liberia)	5	Joseph Aidoo	0	0	1	0	1
4	FW	(United States)	13	Tom Suchecki	0	0	1	0	1
4	MF	(United States)	21	Zachary Reynolds	1	0	-	-	1

=== Disciplinary record ===
Number	Nation	Position	Name	Fall Season		Fall Playoffs		Legends Cup		Spring Season		Total	
Number	Nation	Position	Name	Booked	Sent off (straight red)	Booked	Sent off (straight red)	Booked	Sent off (straight red)	Booked	Sent off (straight red)	Booked	Sent off (straight red)
1	(Iran)	GK	Arshia Aghababazadeh	1	0	0	0	-	-	-	-	1	0
3	(Israel)	DF	Gonnie Ben-Tal	1	0	0	0	-	-	-	-	1	0
5	(Liberia)	DF	Joseph Aidoo	0	0	0	0	3	1	2	0	5	1
6	(El Salvador)	FW	Bernardo Majano	-	-	-	-	1	0	0	0	1	0
6	(Cameroon)	MF	Remy Tazifor	0	0	0	1	-	-	0	1	0	2
7	(United States)	MF	Steven Juncaj	2	0	1	0	0	0	0	0	3	0
8	(United States)	DF	Brian Vang	0	0	1	0	1	0	0	0	2	0
9	(Chile)	DF	Tomas Bernedo	1	0	0	0	-	-	-	-	1	0
10	(United States)	DF	Kyle Nuel	1	0	0	0	1	0	1	0	3	0
14	(Spain)	FW	Alexander Satrústegui	1	0	2	1	0	0	0	0	3	1
15	(Venezuela)	DF	Andrés Chalbaud	0	0	0	0	0	0	1	0	1	0
16	(Zimbabwe)	GK	Tatenda Mkuruva	0	0	1	0	1	0	1	0	3	0
21	(United States)	MF	Zachary Reynolds	1	0	0	0	0	0	2	0	3	0
23	(United States)	DF	Patrick Sullivan	1	0	0	0	-	-	-	-	1	0
23	(United States)	DF	Carl Schneider	-	-	-	-	0	0	1	0	1	0
25	(England)	DF	James Abraham	0	0	0	0	1	0	1	0	2	0
30	(United States)	DF	Devon Amoo-Mensah	0	0	0	0	0	0	2	0	2	0

== See also ==
- 2020–21 NISA season
