= Turenne des Pres =

Turenne des Pres is a Haitian surname, also shortened to Des Pres. Notable people with the surname include:

- François Turenne des Pres (1907–?), Haitian artist and writer
- Josquin Des Pres (c. 1450/1455–1521), French composer
- Sebastien Des Pres (born 1998), American soccer player
- Josquin Des Pres (20th century musician)
