= Killing Me Night & Day =

Studio album by Stress
- Released: 1984, CD reissue in 2001
- Recorded: 1984−1985
- Genre: Rock
- Length: 56:29
- Label: Deep Shag Records
- Producer: Josquin Des Pres (20th century musician), Greg Errico & Mark Paladino

Debut album from San Diego melodic rock band, Stress. It was originally released on LP in 1984 by Bernett Records and reissued on CD in 2001 by Deep Shag Records. The CD reissue contains the entire recorded output of the band including the original LP, a two track 12" single plus five unreleased bonus tracks - two are outtakes from the original LP and three are the sessions with Jimmy Crespo (former guitarist for Aerosmith & Rough Cutt).

== Track listing ==
1. Burning In Your Fire
2. Never Should Have Turned Around
3. Don't Need No Education
4. Killing Me Night & Day
5. Prime Time To Party
6. Save Me
7. I Can't Get Over You
8. It's Too Bad
9. Search For The Fool (bonus track: A-Side from 1985 non-album single)
10. You're So Critical (bonus track A-Side from 1985 non-album single)
11. It Makes Me Mad (bonus track: 1984 outtake)
12. Friday On My Mind (bonus track: 1984 outtake, The Easybeats cover)
13. Let Me Make It Alright (bonus track: 1986 sessions with Jimmy Crespo)
14. Don't Let Go (bonus track: 1986 sessions with Jimmy Crespo)
15. Key To Your Heart (bonus track: 1986 sessions with Jimmy Crespo)

== Personnel ==
from the reissue credits

all songs written and composed by Josquin Des Pres (20th century musician) and Thomas except for:

- "It's Too Bad" by Des Pres and Nicholson
- "Friday On My Mind" by George Young and Harry Vanda

musicians:

- Josquin Des Pres - bass, keyboards & additional vocals
- Mike Thomas - vocals & guitars
- Tim Nicholson - guitars & additional vocals (all songs except the 1986 sessions)
- Jimmy Crespo - guitars & additional vocals (1986 sessions)
- Jeff Gabaldon - drums (all original LP tracks except for the title track)
- John Shearer - drums (original LP outtakes and title track)
- Leroy Vega - drums (non-album single and 1986 sessions)
- Bill Van Wulven - additional backing vocals
