= The Complete Sussman Lawrence (1979–1985) =

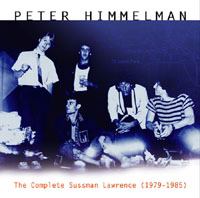

Compilation album by Sussman Lawrence
- Released: 2004
- Recorded: 1979–1985
- Genres: Pop, rock, new wave
- Length: 118:12
- Label: Deep Shag Records
- Producers: Sussman Lawrence, Michael McKern, Dale Goulett, Ritchie Cordell, Glen Kolotkin & Steve Greenberg

The Complete Sussman Lawrence (1979–1985) is the 2004 2CD reissue on Deep Shag Records of Sussman Lawrence's two rare indie albums—Hail to the Modern Hero! (1980) and Pop City (1984)—which includes four rare bonus tracks. As the singer, songwriter and guitarist for the band, this set contains the earliest recordings of Peter Himmelman.

Both albums were recorded at the height of Sussman Lawrence's creative genius in sculpting a sound that veteran Billboard writer Jim Bessman, who covered the group for Variety, aptly called a cross between Bruce Springsteen and Elvis Costello.

== Track listing ==
- DISC ONE (Hail To The Modern Hero!)
1. Shelly's Dog
2. Rock Slow
3. Ode To Another Egg
4. Where Are The Leaders
5. Another Song About Erections
6. The Way You Touch
7. So Hard And Shiny
8. Information
9. Cast Away For Merchandise
10. Modern Saint*
11. Fortunate*
12. Hard Rock Tambourine*
13. Tough Suction (live)*

(*) unreleased bonus tracks

- DISC TWO (Pop City)
1. Torture Me
2. She's The Living End
3. (I Really Don't Love You But)I Sure Do Like You A Lot
4. The Fifth Of August
5. House On Fire
6. Fireman
7. Naturally (You're Artificial)
8. Closer, Closer
9. 1.5 BMMPH
10. Made To Order
11. Hope
12. Listen Up
13. Pajama Party
14. The Strangest Emotion
15. Bitter World
16. The Sperm Song
17. Baby Let Me Be Your Cigarette
18. Luxury
19. Call Me On Monday
20. Love Is A Fight
