= Deep Shag Records =

- Founded: 2000
- Founder: Michael Reed
- Genre: Rock, new wave, comedy, spoken word
- Country of origin: U.S.
- Location: Atlanta, Georgia
- Official website: www.deepshag.com

Deep Shag Records was an American record label founded in 2000 by Michael Reed. The label was known for the On the Road With Ellison series of releases by Harlan Ellison and for re-issuing rare 1980's modern rock, new wave, comedy, and spoken word albums previously unavailable on CD.

== History ==
Michael Reed, founder of Deep Shag Records, established the label driven by his passion for records and frustration over certain titles in his personal collection not being brought into the digital age. Concerned that the cherished music, comedy, and spoken word of his youth might be lost to history, Reed leveraged his 15 years of experience in the music industry to provide a new home for these nearly forgotten gems.

In 2001, Deep Shag was fortunate enough to secure the rights to the rare 1982 spoken word album On the Road with Ellison Volume 1 by noted author and raconteur Harlan Ellison. The release was a great success and Deep Shag was granted access to the author's vast audio archive. The series resumed in 2005 with On the Road with Ellison Volume 2 some 23 years after the original vinyl release of the first volume.

After 25 years, Michael Reed folded the label in 2025.

== Overview ==
Deep Shag Records was headquartered in Atlanta, Georgia and had the mission to be a label that "refuses to sit in just one section of your collection."

== Artists ==
- Harlan Ellison
- Peter Himmelman
- Sussman Lawrence
- The Frantics
- Stress
- Assassin
- Fish Karma

== Release history ==
Year	No.	Artist	Title
2001	SHAG1	Fish Karma	Lunch with the Devil
2001	SHAG2	Stress	Killing Me Night & Day
2001	SHAG3	Harlan Ellison	On the Road with Ellison Volume 1
2003	SHAG4	The Frantics	Frantic Times
2004	SHAG5	Peter Himmelman & Sussman Lawrence	The Complete Sussman Lawrence (1979–1985)
2004	SHAG6	Harlan Ellison	On the Road with Ellison Volume 2
2007	SHAG7	Harlan Ellison	On the Road with Ellison Volume 3
2009	SHAG8	Assassin	Assassin
2010	SHAG9	Harlan Ellison	On the Road with Ellison Volume 4
2011	SHAG10	Harlan Ellison	On the Road with Ellison Volume 5
2012	SHAG11	Harlan Ellison	On the Road with Ellison Volume 6
2018	SHAG12	Harlan Ellison	On the Road with Ellison Volume 7
2024	SHAG13	Harlan Ellison	On the Road with Ellison Volume 8
