= Sacko Konate =

American-Guinean footballer (born 1998)

Personal information
- Date of birth: October 13, 1998 (age 28)
- Place of birth: United States
- Height: 6 ft 6 in (1.98 m)
- Position: Defender

Youth career
- Marly La Ville ES

College career
Years	Team	Apps	(Gls)
2021	Whatcom Orcas	16	(0)

Senior career*
Years	Team	Apps	(Gls)
2021–2022	Sporting International FC		
2023	Altitude FC	13	(1)
2024	Michigan Stars FC	12	(1)
2025	TSS FC Rovers	2	(0)
2025	Bellevue Athletic FC	2	(0)
2025	Midlakes United	4	(0)
2025	Bellevue Athletic FC	6	(0)
2026	Michigan Stars FC		
2026–	Columbus United FC	10	(2)

International career^{‡}
2025–	Guinea	2	(0)
- * Club domestic league appearances and goals as of October 3, 2026 ‡ National team caps and goals as of November 14, 2025

Sacko Konate (born October 13, 1998) is a footballer who plays for Michigan Stars FC in the National independent soccer association. Born in the United States, he represents Guinea at international level.

== Early life ==
Konate was born in the United States, but raised in Paris, France, where he played youth soccer with Marly La Ville ES.

== College career ==
In 2021, Konate attended Whatcom Community College, where he played for the men's soccer team.

== Club career ==
In 2021, Konate began playing with Sporting International FC. In 2022, he attended pre-season training camp with Colorado Rapids 2.

In 2023, he played with Altitude FC in League1 British Columbia.

In March 2024, he signed with Michigan Stars FC in the National Independent Soccer Association. On April 2, 2024, he scored the winning goal in a 2-0 victory over Minnesota United FC 2 of MLS Next Pro in the 2024 U.S. Open Cup. At the end of the season, he was named a league Second Team All-Star.

In 2025, Konate played with TSS FC Rovers in League1 British Columbia. Later he played with Midlakes United in USL League Two.

Later in 2025, he joined Bellevue Athletic FC in the United Premier Soccer League. He had previously spent some time with Idaho Cutthroats and Deportivo Rose City in UPSL as well.

In March 2026, he was linked to a return with Michigan Stars FC in NISA, although NISA never resumed. Later, in March 2026, he began playing with Southern Indiana FC of the UPSL, also playing with them in the 2026 US Open Cup. On May 1, 2026, Columbus United FC announced they signed Konate for the upcoming 2026 USL League Two season.

== International career ==
In November 2025, Konate was called up to the Guinea national team.

== Personal life ==
Konate is the younger brother of Guinea national football team player Mory Konaté.
