= On the Road with Ellison Volume 5 =

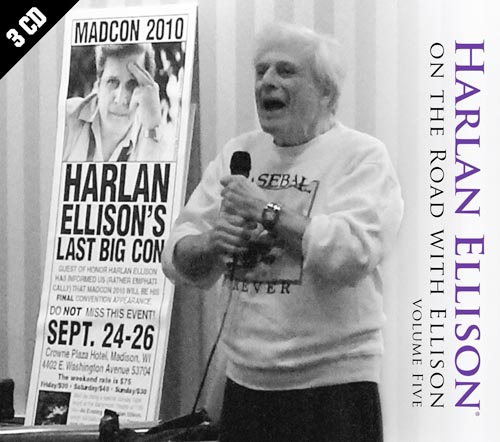

Live album by Harlan Ellison
- Released: 2011
- Recorded: 2010
- Genre: Spoken word, comedy
- Length: 232:10
- Label: Deep Shag Records
- Producer: Michael Reed

Harlan Ellison chronology
On the Road with Ellison Volume 4 (2010)	On the Road with Ellison Volume 5 (2011)	On the Road with Ellison Volume 6 (2012)

Released in 2011 by Deep Shag Records, On the Road with Ellison Volume 5 is a massive 3CD deluxe set chronicling Harlan Ellison’s three days in Madison, Wisconsin at MadCon 2010. The release features an exclusive new Ellison essay written for this release. At 76, Mr. Ellison has stated publicly that MadCon 2010 would be his final convention appearance ever.

== Track listing ==
On the Road with Ellison Volume 5 is intended to be listened to as a whole and is broken up into individual tracks only for easier navigation. Sound recorded and engineered by Brad James Beske.

- Disc one
1. A Warning
2. Friday Part 1
3. Friday Part 2
4. Friday Part 3
5. Friday Part 4
6. Friday Part 5
7. Friday Part 6
8. Friday Part 7
9. Friday Part 8
10. Friday Part 9
11. Friday Part 10
12. Friday Part 11
13. Saturday Part 1
14. Saturday Part 2
15. Saturday Part 3
- Disc two
1. Saturday Part 4
2. Saturday Part 5
3. Saturday Part 6
4. Saturday Part 7
5. Saturday Part 8
6. Saturday Part 9
7. Saturday Part 10
8. Saturday Banquet Part 1
9. Saturday Banquet Part 2
10. Saturday Banquet Part 3
11. Saturday Banquet Part 4
12. Saturday Banquet Part 5
13. Saturday Banquet Part 6
14. Saturday Banquet Part 7
15. Saturday Banquet Part 8
- Disc three
1. Saturday Banquet Part 9
2. Sunday Part 1
3. Sunday Part 2
4. Sunday Part 3
5. Sunday Part 4
6. Sunday Part 5
7. Sunday Part 6
8. Sunday Part 7
9. Sunday Part 8
10. Sunday Part 9
11. Sunday Part 10
12. Sunday Part 11
13. Sunday Part 12
14. Sunday Part 13
15. Sunday Part 14
