= On the Road with Ellison Volume 2 =

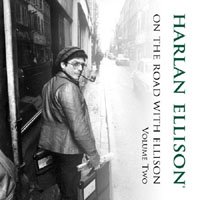

Live album by Harlan Ellison
- Released: 2004
- Recorded: 1981–1983
- Genre: Spoken word, comedy
- Length: 70:29
- Label: Deep Shag Records
- Producer: Michael Reed

Harlan Ellison chronology
On the Road with Ellison Volume 1 (2001)	On the Road with Ellison Volume 2 (2004)	On the Road with Ellison Volume 3 (2007)

Released in 2004 by Deep Shag Records, On the Road with Ellison Volume 2 is a collection of humorous and thought provoking moments from the vaults of Harlan Ellison. The CD features a new essay written by Harlan for this release. When Harlan Ellison speaks, no topic is off-limits. This is not Harlan reading his work; it's a collection of interesting observations and stories from his life.

== Track listing ==
1. You Have Been Warned
2. The Player In The Bogus Blue Blazer
3. The "I, Robot" Tragedy
4. Demented SF Movie Harangue
5. Quickies Redux
6. Mailing Labels, Or, How Corporate America Goes Sticky All Over You
7. Diabetes & The Anti-Christ
8. Why We Will Never Enjoy The Pleasures Of Atomic Holocaust: A Theory
9. Reagan's "Enemies" List
10. How Steve McQueen Saved My Life
11. Deductive Logic
12. The Dick
13. Where There's Smoke
14. And Now, The Sermon & Soup
