= Young Dubliners =

American rock band

- Origin: Los Angeles, CA, U.S
- Genres: Celtic rock; folk rock
- Years active: 1988–present
- Labels: Scotti Bros., Cargo Music, Higher Octave Music, 429 Records
- Members: Keith Roberts; Chas Waltz; Dave Ingraham; Justin Pecot; Ethan Jones
- Website: youngdubliners.com

The Young Dubliners (sometimes shortened to the Young Dubs or just The Dubs) is an Irish-American rock band formed in Santa Monica, California, in 1988. Lead singer and rhythm guitarist Keith Roberts has remained the only constant member of the band. The other current members include violinist Chas Waltz, drummer David Ingraham, guitarist Justin Pecot, and bassist Ethan Jones.

They describe their music as "original rock compositions and Irish folk songs with a rock twist" and their stated influences include Thin Lizzy, The Pogues, The Waterboys, Big Country, and U2. AllMusic states, "[t]heir sound defies categorization" and describes them as "Ireland's answer to Los Lobos, with a similar combination of traditional folk music, raucous electric rock, and forward-thinking experimentation".

The band was signed to Scotti Brothers Records in early 1994 and released the EP Rocky Road to the Adult Album Alternative radio format, where it reached 37 the week of May 6, 1994. It was followed by the full-length album Breathe on June 13, 1995. Shortly after, the band starting touring nationally. The lineup at that time included co-founders Keith Roberts and Paul O’Toole sharing vocals and guitar duties, fellow Irishman Brendan Holmes on bass, violinist Chas Waltz, Jeff Dellisanti on saxophone, Randy Woolford on lead guitar, and Jon Mattox on drums.

In 1997, the group signed with Cargo Music, which marked the beginning of a tumultuous period of major tours, label and personnel changes, and multiple record releases. Violinist Chas Waltz left and was replaced by Mark Epting. In August 1997 the band recorded a live album, Alive, Alive ‘O, with producers Steve Albini and Josquin Des Pres (American musician). for their new label, but co-founder Paul O’Toole left the band just before the album’s release February 10, 1998.

In June 2000 they released Red with OmTown/Higher Octave records. The lyrics for the title track were written by Elton John’s writing partner Bernie Taupin, who gifted it to the band; they subsequently played it at his birthday party at House of Blues. The album was produced by Thom Panunzio. Just after the album’s release guitarist Randy Woolford retired and was replaced by Bob Boulding and drummer Jon Mattox was replaced by David Ingraham, formerly with Tribe of Gypsies. That same year they recorded the theme song for the ABC sitcom Madigan Men.

In 2001, violinist Chas Waltz returned to the band and they joined Jethro Tull on a two-month, 30-city international tour. In 2002, they played the Winter Olympics in Salt Lake City, UT. That June they released a new album, Absolutely. Killian’s beer used a track from the album in a commercial and offered the band a sponsorship deal that included a Killian’s branded tour bus. Shortly after, the band rejoined Jethro Tull for a US tour.

They followed that by joining Canadian band Great Big Sea and American Celtic rock band Seven Nations to form the Uprooted tour and also toured as the opening act for John Hiatt. In 2004, while preparing a third album with Higher Octave, lead singer Roberts developed vocal cord nodules which required surgery. After a brief delay they resumed recording and touring and the album, Real World, was released February 15, 2005. Jethro Tull’s Ian Anderson played flute on an instrumental track, "Banshee" and Eric Rigler appeared throughout the album on uilleann pipes. The Washington Post described the album as, "the commercial gold at the end of the rainbow for this criminally underappreciated rock band."

In 2006, they signed with 429 Records and recorded an album consisting solely of covers of Irish songs. With All Due Respect - The Irish Sessions was released February 13, 2007 and reached 14 on the Billboard World Music chart. The single Rocky Road to Dublin peaked at 2 and remained on the chart for 115 weeks, while Foggy Dew reached 18 and remained on the chart for four weeks. In 2007, the Young Dubliners toured Denmark, performed a handful of shows in Norway, and played at the G! Festival in the Faroe Islands. On March 15, 2008, the group appeared live on the CBS Early Show. On February 3, 2009, they released Saints and Sinners on 429 Records. The album featured guest performances by Cindy Wasserman and Kenny Wayne Shepherd. On March 17, 2009, the band appeared on ABC-TV's Jimmy Kimmel Live!, and performed two tracks, "Rosie" and the album's title track, "Saint And Sinners". Jimmy Kimmel Live! featured the group a second time on March 17, 2011, when they played "Howya Girls".

On July 13, 2013, the band released their ninth album, titled 9, which was funded by independent crowdfunding.

== Discography ==
- Rocky Road (1994)
- Breathe (1995)
- Alive Alive'O (1998, live)
- Red (2000)
- Absolutely (2002)
- Real World (2005)
- With All Due Respect - The Irish Sessions (2007)
- Saints and Sinners (2009)
- 9 (2013)
- Home Movies (2003, DVD)
