= Fish Karma =

American musician

- Born: Terry Owen; 1959 (age 66–67)
- Origin: Tucson, Arizona, United States
- Genres: Punk rock, folk rock, comedy rock
- Years active: 1980s–present
- Labels: Addled, Triple X, San Jacinto, Deep Shag, Alternative Tentacles

Fish Karma (real name Terry Owen, born 1959) is an American punk rock/comedy rock/folk rock musician from Tucson, Arizona, United States.

== Biography ==
Fish Karma has also described as "one of the worst vocalists ever to have the gall to step in front of a mic, his voice falling somewhere between Neil Young after a swift boot to the naughty bits and the dying screech of a depleted air horn". His career in creative antagonism began at the University of Arizona where Fish worked with a student run comedy troupe. An early incarnation of Owen's stage persona featured Karma garbed in elf shoes and a full-length burlap gown (purchased at a Tucson thrift store) festooned with bottle caps.

While performing at a club called Tequila Mockingbird, Karma so offended musician Al Perry (who was employed as a bartender at the club) with his perverse renderings of Delta blues that Perry intentionally disrupted Karma's performances by running an electric drink mixer during his songs. This early antagonism led fortuitously to a musical collaboration lasting more than two decades. Recording on only the cheapest and most inferior equipment, Perry, like a revolted yet somewhat intrigued biographer, began capturing Fish's songs on tape. Karma's concerts made him a cult figure. Byron Coley of The Village Voice said "Fish is a great entertainer. Live, he strums along at whatever tempo he wants & rants & raves the funniest observations this side of George Carlin." Karma worked with Al Perry & The Cattle, Mojo Nixon and Jello Biafra who says "Fish's music is your basic FUGS-style electric grunge folk, and his lyrics feature some of the meanest put-downs of American consumer culture I've heard in years." The songs "Should I Shop Or Should I Die" and "Grenada" aim their sights squarely at America's obsession with materialism and the need to police the world.

After a few self-released albums, Fish got a record deal and put out two CDs: Teddy In The Sky With Magnets (1991) and Sunnyslope (1993). His trademark song "God Is A Groovy Guy" is about the ferocious and anal retentive Jehovah of the Old Testament that says "You are all doomed - especially you!". After years of touring, Fish took a break in 1995; only popping up in 1998 to collaborate with Andy Young on the children's record, The Dangerous Playground.

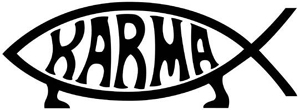
Fish Karma logo

The Tucson Weekly said "He's hilarious, irreverent, disgusting and thoroughly insightful. He's sort of a cross between Frank Zappa in the Freak Out days and early Bob Dylan ramblings." Fish is well known for his wry wit and humor, as well as an insatiable need to spit on all things conventional. He says "Part of my problem is that the first record I ever heard was "My Ding-A-Ling" by Chuck Berry. I have been struggling to overcome that disability ever since." Fish Karma's music is a tortured testament of his laughter in the face of oblivion. He is an eternally befuddled spokesperson for important social issues of which he has only a vague understanding.

== Discography ==
=== Singles ===
- "Hellhound on my Leg" (7", Addled Records)
- "American" (7", Sapient Records)

=== Albums ===
- To Hell With Love, I'm Going Bowling (cassette) (Addled Records)
- Disco Entropy (Addled Records)
- Teddy in the Sky with Magnets (1991) (Triple X)
- Sunnyslope (1993) (Triple X)
- The Dangerous Playground (1998) (San Jacinto)
- Lunch With The Devil (2001) (Deep Shag Records)
- The Theory of Intelligent Design (2006) (Alternative Tentacles)
- Halloween in America (2010) (Alternative Tentacles)
- Lethal Fairy tales (2012) (Alternative Tentacles)

== Other sources ==
- Fish Karma @ Deep Shag Records (An earlier revision of this article is copied from this source with permission)
- Fish Karma at AllMusic
