= Skin (Peter Himmelman album) =

Studio album by Peter Himmelman
- Released: 1994
- Genre: Rock
- Label: 550 Music/Epic
- Producer: Peter Himmelman, Jeff Victor

Peter Himmelman chronology
Flown This Acid World (1992)	Skin (1994)	Stage Diving (1996)

Skin is an album by the American musician Peter Himmelman, released in 1994. It is a concept album about a man named Ted who dies and is spiritually reborn; Himmelman chose to think of it as a song cycle.

Himmelman supported the album by playing it on tour from beginning to end, before moving on to his older songs. The first single was "With You".

== Production ==
The album was produced by Himmelman and Jeff Victor. Himmelman was backed by his touring band, with the addition of J'anna Jacoby on violin. Its lyrics were inspired in part by Himmelman's Judaism. 550 Music had urged Himmelman not to make a concept album.

== Critical reception ==
Professional ratings
Review scores
Source	Rating
AllMusic	4.5/5 stars
Chicago Tribune	3/4 stars
The Encyclopedia of Popular Music	3/5 stars
The Indianapolis Star	2.5/4 stars
Knoxville News Sentinel	2/5 stars
MusicHound Rock: The Essential Album Guide	3.5/5 stars
Windsor Star	C

The Washington Post deemed the album "a legitimate rock opera." The New York Times wrote that it "moves from hymns to guitar-strumming waltzes to up-tempo, neo-1960's rock." The Knoxville News Sentinel called Skin "trite," writing that the album "lacks the character motivation and simple details that should move the story along, which is particularly damning considering Himmelman seems to have sleighted the music on behalf of the lyrics."

The Chicago Tribune praised the "solid pop-rock-folk tunesmithy" of Himmelman. The Daily Press stated: "Filled with memorable songs, such as the gripping rockers 'Easy to Be Broken' and '11 Months in the Bath of Dirty Spirits', the stark ballad 'Nowhere Else to Go' and the elegant record-ending track 'Been Set Free', Skin is both musically and lyrically ambitious." Newsday labeled it "a ponderously flimsy concept work about corruption, death, rebirth and redemption in which the alternation of loud theatricality and quiet keyboard-violin delicacy sounded like a baseball game between Pink Floyd and Meat Loaf."

AllMusic wrote that "the occasional heavy-handedness and meandering subplots hardly mar this impressive work."

== Track listing ==
No.	Title	Length
1.	"Prelude"
2.	"11 Months in the Bath of Dirty Spirits"
3.	"Clean"
4.	"They're Naked and They're Calling Me"
5.	"Disposable Child"
6.	"Regular Daydreams"
7.	"With You"
8.	"Shilo"
9.	"Laugh My Beloved"
10.	"Easy to Be Broken"
11.	"The 5th of August"
12.	"Nowhere Else to Go"
13.	"Chaos and Void"
14.	"Been Set Free"
