= Sussman Lawrence =

Musical group

Sussman Lawrence was a band led by Peter Himmelman on lead vocals and guitar, with his cousin Jeff Victor on keyboards and backup vocals. Both had previously performed as the only white members in Minneapolis soul singer Alexander O'Neal's band. Saxophonist Eric Moen, bass guitarist Al Wolovitch, and drummer Andrew Kamman rounded out the group, which formed in the late ‘70s and took its name from a character on Steamroller, a local public-access television comedy show that Himmelman hosted.

The members of Sussman Lawrence had all gone to junior high school together in the Minneapolis suburb of St. Louis Park. Heavily influenced by Jimi Hendrix and Bob Marley, Himmelman (who also performed with Shangoya where he added a 'rock-guitar' flavor to the Caribbean sound) brought a pronounced reggae/ska flavor to their debut album Hail To The Modern Hero! and then embellished it on the more polished and ambitiously pop-oriented follow up, the double LP Pop City. Both albums fueled Sussman Lawrence's incendiary live shows with such fan favorites as “House on Fire,” “Baby Let Me Be Your Cigarette,” “Closer, Closer,” and “The Fifth of August”—a love song that would resurface on Himmelman's 1994 album Skin.

Searching for greater glory, Sussman Lawrence left the midwest in 1984 for the east coast. Settling in Ridgewood, New Jersey, the band gained a foothold in the thriving Manhattan concert scene with their way-over-the-top live shows. Himmelman's writing, however, was beginning to take a turn inward, as evidenced on his first solo album This Father's Day, which was independently released in 1985 and then re-released by Island Records the following year. Recorded with the same band he'd been with since 1979, Sussman Lawrence then became The Peter Himmelman Band.

Peter Himmelman would go on as a solo recording artist. Now based in Los Angeles, he has branched out, composing popular children's records and award-winning music for film and television—most notably the hit CBS drama Judging Amy. Also in L.A. are Andy Kamman, who moved on to play drums for Vonda Shepard and the recording group Uma, and Al Wolovitch, who is a scorer of TV shows and commercials in his own right. Eric Moen is back in Minneapolis, as is Jeff Victor, who has been performing live at Timberwolves home games and touring with The Honeydogs, in addition to winning Emmy and Cleo awards while producing CDs for Target Corp's Lifescape label.

== Discography ==
- Hail To The Modern Hero! (LP, 1980)
- Pop City (double LP, 1984)
- The Complete Sussman Lawrence (1979-1985) (double CD reissue with bonus tracks) (CD, Deep Shag Records, 2004)
