= On the Road with Ellison Volume 7 =

Live album by Harlan Ellison
- Released: 2018
- Recorded: 1983
- Genre: Spoken word, comedy
- Length: 126:16
- Label: Deep Shag
- Producer: Michael Reed

Harlan Ellison chronology
On the Road with Ellison Volume 6 (2012)	On the Road with Ellison Volume 7 (2018)	On the Road with Ellison Volume 8 (2024)

On the Road with Ellison Volume Seven is a spoken word album by Harlan Ellison published as a 2-CD set. It is mostly a reissue of "An Hour With Ellison" which was a cassette-only release in 1983. Harlan talks about Gene Roddenberry’s office, if he watches Judge Judy, where he gets his ideas, should he be in charge of Middle East peace, and other topics.

== Track listing ==
- Disc one
1. Opening Gambits
2. Reading Voltaire to a Cage of Baboons
3. Tales of the Green Monkey
4. The Back of Your Underwear Drawer
5. Baggies of Blood
6. Me and Judge Judy
7. Who Needs The Quickie Smart?
8. Origins: “Bleeding Stones”
9. Why I Didn’t Go to Israel
10. The Consequences of Tactlessness
11. Straight Outta Schenectady
12. The Moment with Bill Maher, or, It Broke Off in a Stiff Wind
13. An Average Ellison Day?
14. Broadly Speaking, Most People Are Just Awful
15. Collective Amnesia
16. Origins: “I Have No Mouth, and I Must Scream”
- Disc two
1. An Hour with Harlan Ellison: Loving Reminiscences of the Dying Gasp of the Pulp Era (vinyl reissue)
