= On the Road with Ellison Volume 1 =

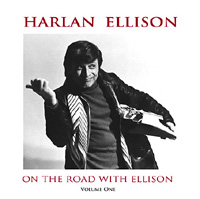

Live album by Harlan Ellison
- Released: 1983, CD reissue 2001
- Recorded: 1981–1983
- Genre: Spoken word, comedy
- Length: 41:49
- Label: Deep Shag Records
- Producer: Shelley Levinson

Harlan Ellison chronology
On the Road with Ellison Volume 1 (1983)	On the Road with Ellison Volume 2 (2004)

First released in 1983 as an extremely limited edition vinyl album, On the Road with Ellison Volume 1 was reissued on CD in 2001 by Deep Shag Records. The CD features liner notes written by Harlan specifically for the release. From the mailing of a dead gopher to a perfect impression of Tattoo from Fantasy Island, you get inside the head of America's most outspoken wordsmith.

== Track listing ==
1. Intro: Caveat Ellison
2. You're Short
3. Selected Quickies
4. Did You Really Mail A Dead Gopher To An Editor?
5. Bugfuck Is A Way Of Life
6. Carl Sagan Is A Nifty Guy
7. Cosmic Nuhdges
8. Gee, Gang, Kids Say The Darndest Things
9. An Edge In My Voice:Installment #54 (December 19, 1982)
