= Assassin (band) =

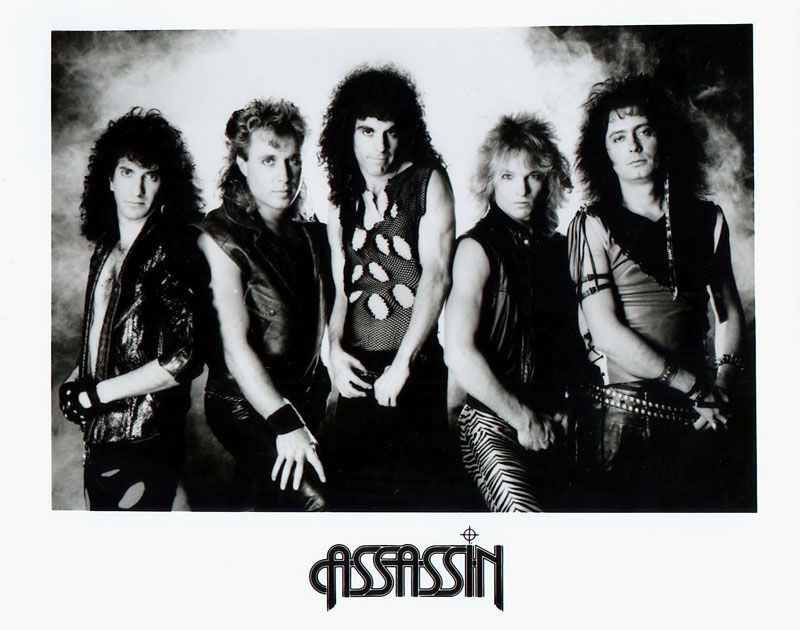
- Publicity photo circa 1985

Background information
- Origin: San Diego, California
- Genres: Hard rock, Heavy metal
- Years active: 1983–1986; 1988
- Label: Deep Shag Records
- Past members: Thom Beebe; Vinnie Cavarra; Leroy Vega; Pete Papps; Neil Foote; John Osmon; Dave Bundy; Marc Anthony

Assassin was a heavy metal band that was formed in San Diego during the summer of 1983 by guitarists Thom Beebe and Vinnie Cavarra. They sought out noted drummer Leroy Vega and, in recruiting him, also lucked into a vocalist, his friend Pete Papps, both of whom had previously played in the band Vengeance with future Dio guitarist Craig Goldy. After a brief stint with bassist Neil Foote, the band settled into its classic early line-up with the addition of Chicago native John Osmon on bass, another former Vengeance member.

Thom brought in a handful of songs from his previous band, Child, which had briefly featured Jake E. Lee on second guitar, and Vinnie had a few songs as well. Assassin took these songs, broke them down, and molded each one to suit the band's direction. With a solid core of material, they began writing Assassin originals that ran from sleazy power blues to hard rockers.

Taking these songs to the clubs and concert halls of San Diego gave the band a chance to "road test" the material. The Assassin live show was well regarded and earned the band opening slots for national acts like Alcatrazz, Girlschool, Coney Hatch, Wendy O. Williams, King Kobra, Poison, Precious Metal, L.A. Guns, Raven, Blue Murder, Grim Reaper, Anthrax, Rough Cutt, and Slayer. With such recognition, Assassin knew it was time to get into the studio.

The Assassin album was recorded in early 1984. From these sessions, the band released a 7" single of the concert favorites, "Treason" and "All Your Love". "Treason" was also the opening cut on No Substitute For Steel, a 1985 compilation spotlighting the San Diego hard rock and metal scene. In addition, the song would also appear on the Metal Madness Volume One compilation on New Renaissance Records. By the summer of 1985, the band was working towards getting a record deal. It was during this time that Leroy Vega departed for the group Stress and was replaced by new drummer, Dave "Bundy" Imondi who would turn up in the bands I, Napoleon and Warrior, in the 1990s.

Assassin played at many San Diego clubs: Straita Head Sound, The California Theater, Carnation Hall, Circle Sounds, Rogo's, The Spirit, My Rich Uncle's, The Bacchanal, The Fox Theater, and even did a show for fans in Tijuana. As Assassin continued to refine their sound, the band was honored in the pages of local metal zine Loud N Clear as "Best Local Band" and "Best Local Song" ("Treason").

By the end of 1985, Assassin had received several label offers, but was holding out for just the right deal. While working towards that goal, Pete Papps left in January 1986 to form Red Alert, and the band brought in L.A. vocalist Mark "Anthony" Del Papa. Assassin continued on a short while longer before geographical problems with their new singer arose, limiting the band's rehearsal time. Mark Del Papa left Assassin, going on to sign a deal with his band Broken Silence in 1986 and this forced the band to implode. Assassin played one more show with original singer Pete Papps almost two years later at Club Mirage In San Diego, CA on February 6, 1988. This signalled the end of the band.

In 2009, the band's unreleased studio album was issued through Deep Shag Records. On April 17, 2010, the original Assassin line-up of Pete Papps, Thom Beebe, Vinnie Cavarra, John Osmon, and Leroy Vega reunited in San Diego for a one time only reunion show at 4th & B along with other local bands from the 80s.

Osmon and drummer Dave "Bundy" Imondi have re-teamed in Deep Purple tribute band Deeper Purple; Osmon is also a member of OU812, a Van Halen/Sammy Hagar tribute band. As of 2012, Beebe and his wife PK were active in the band Steampunk Willie. Meanwhile, Cavarra was last seen playing with the band Toyz in Oregon.

== Former members ==
- Pete Papps - vocals (1983–1985; 1988; 2009)
- Mark Anthony Del Papa - vocals (1985-1986)
- Thom Beebe - lead guitar (1983–1986; 1988; 2009)
- Vinnie Cavarra - lead guitar (1983–1986; 1988; 2009)
- Neil Foote - bass guitar (1983)
- John Osmon - bass guitar (1983–1986; 1988; 2009; died 2025)
- Leroy Vega - drums (1983–1985; 2009)
- Dave Bundy - drums (1985–1986; 1988)

== Discography ==
- Treason b/w All Your Love (7" single, self-released, 1984)
- Various - No Substitute For Steel (T.A.S.S. Records, 1985) w/ "Treason"
- Various - Metal Madness Volume One (New Renaissance Records, 1985) w/ "Treason"
- Assassin (CD, Deep Shag Records, 2009)
