= Stress (pop rock band) =

American pop rock band (1983–1987)

- Origin: San Diego, California, U.S.
- Genre: Pop rock
- Years active: 1983–1987
- Labels: Deep Shag Records, Burnett Records
- Past members: Josquin Des Pres; Mike Thomas; Tim Nicholsen; Jeff Gabaldon; Leroy Vega; Jimmy Crespo

Stress was an American pop rock band formed in San Diego, California, in 1983.

== Biography ==
Stress was founded in 1983 by bassist Josquin des Pres and vocalist/guitarist Mike Thomas. They added guitarist Tim Nicholson and went through a number of drummers; most notably Jeff Gabaldon and Leroy Vega (formerly of Assassin). When Nicholson left in early 1985, he was replaced with guitarist Jimmy Crespo, who had previously played with Aerosmith.

Stress performed primarily in San Diego and Los Angeles performing at clubs such as Madame Wong's, FM Station, The Troubadour, and The Roxy.

Stress Disbanded in late 1987 when Josquin Des Pres began a career as a record producer and Mike Thomas started a solo career. His first solo effort "Circular Motion" recorded in France in 1988 was produced by Josquin Des Pres.

== Former members ==
- Mike Thomas - vocals, guitar
- Tim Nicholson - guitar, backing vocals
- Josquin Des Pres - bass, backing vocals, keyboards
- Jeff Gabaldon - drums
- Leroy Vega - drums
- Jimmy Crespo - guitar, backing vocals

== Discography ==
=== Studio albums ===
- Killing Me Night & Day (1984) Burnett Records
- Killing Me Night & Day (reissue with bonus tracks) (2001) Deep Shag Records

=== Singles ===
- Killing Me Night & Day/It's Too Bad (1984) Burnett Records
- Search For The Fool/You're So Critical (1985) N.E.W. Records
