= Assassin (album) =

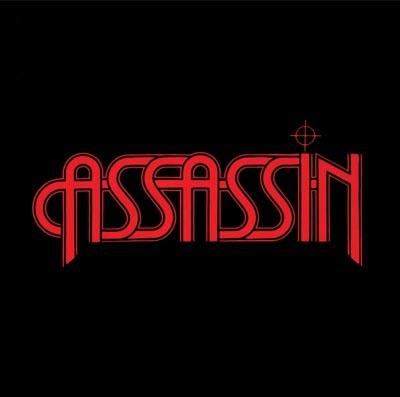

Studio album by Assassin
- Released: 2009
- Recorded: 1984
- Genre: Heavy metal, hard rock
- Length: 58:31
- Label: Deep Shag Records
- Producer: Vincent Cavarra

The Assassin album was recorded in early 1984 and from these sessions, the band released a 7" single of the concert favorites, Treason and All Your Love. By the summer of 1985, the band was working towards getting "the big record deal" and had licensed songs to a few indie metal compilation albums to raise their profile. By the end of 1985, Assassin had received several label offers, but was holding out for just the right deal. While working towards that goal, vocalist Pete Papps left in January 1986 to form Red Alert, and the band brought in L.A. vocalist Marc Anthony. Assassin continued on a short while longer before problems with their new singer forced the band to implode before recording any additional material. The 2009 Deep Shag Records CD release contains the entire 1984 sessions plus 5 live tracks recorded in 1984 at Straita Head Sound in La Mesa, CA

Alternate versions of "All Your Love" and "Backstabber" appear on singer Rick Reed's 2014 EP, But Wait, There's More! Both songs date back to Child, the 70s band that featured Reed and Assassin guitarist, Thom Beebe.

== Track listing ==
1. Treason
2. Angel
3. Nuance Le Dancer
4. Backstabber
5. Tower
6. Triangle
7. Setback
8. No Way
9. All Your Love
10. Feel You Out*
11. The Right Stuff*
12. Street Kid*
13. The Assassin*
14. Treason*

(*) live bonus tracks recorded in 1984 at Straita Head Sound in La Mesa, CA
