= Adil Gowani =

American soccer player (born 1994)

Personal information
- Full name: Adil Amin Gowani Gutierrez
- Date of birth: 2 June 1994 (age 32)
- Place of birth: Hempstead, New York, United States
- Height: 1.88 m (6 ft 2 in)
- Position: Defender

Team information
- Current team: Club de Lyon
- Number: 55

Youth career
- 2015–2017: Mercy College

Senior career*
Years	Team	Apps	(Gls)
2017–2018	Tuxtla F.C.	4	
2018–2019	Sporting Canamy	3	
2019	Atlanta SC	1	
2019–2020	Michigan Stars FC	1	
2020–2021	Leones Dorados F.C.	16	
2022–2023	Inter de Querétaro	5	(0)
2024–	Club de Lyon		
- * Club domestic league appearances and goals

Adil Amin Gowani Gutierrez (born June 2, 1994) is an American soccer player who plays as a defender for National Independent Soccer Association league Club de Lyon.

== Early life ==
Gowani was born in Hempstead, New York, in the United States, to a Sindhi Pakistani father and Mexican mother. He began playing soccer at the age of three in a youth league called St Hughs. Gowani began attending Huntington High School in 2011, where he was captain of the soccer team. He later attended Nassau Community College in 2013.

== Club career ==
=== Early career ===
Gowani played for the soccer team of Mercy University from 2015 until 2017 while majoring in Business Administration.

In 2015, he was named in the second team, appearing in 11 games and recording one goal. In 2016, he started in two games for the team. In 2017, he appeared in 15 games and scored one goal.

=== Tuxtla & Sporting Canamy ===
Once Adil finished college, he moved to Mexico to pursue a professional career. In the summer of 2018, he signed his first professional contract, participating in Mexico's Copa VAR with Sporting Canamy and shortly after went on to play with Tuxtla FC in Mexico's second-tier Serie A. After his stint, Adil went back to Sporting Canamy.

=== Atlanta SC ===
In the fall of 2019, he returned to the United States to join Atlanta SC in the National Independent Soccer Association league.

=== Michigan Stars ===
Gowani then moved to Michigan Stars shortly after in the same league.

=== Leones Dorados ===
In 2020, Gowani signed for Leones Dorados at the Liga de Balompié Mexicano, a semi-professional first division football league in Mexico, being alternate to Liga MX organized by the Mexican Football Federation and member of CONIFA, thus not recognized by FIFA.

==== Trial at CD Victoria ====
In June 2022, Gowani participated in the pre-season with the Honduran first division club C.D. Victoria.

=== Inter de Querétaro ===
In 2022, Gowani moved to Inter de Querétaro in Serie A de México.

=== Club de Lyon ===
In 2024, Gowani returned to the United States joining Club de Lyon.

== International career ==
Gowani is eligible to play for both Pakistan and Mexico due to his heritage, and United States as it is his country of birth. In 2022, Gowani revealed that he had been contacted by the Pakistan Football Federation.

== Personal life ==
Gowani has stated Liverpool as his favorite club and has cited cooking as his favorite activity outside of sports. He has cited Biggie Smalls as his favorite musician and Philippe Coutinho as his favorite soccer player.
