= On the Road with Ellison Volume 3 =

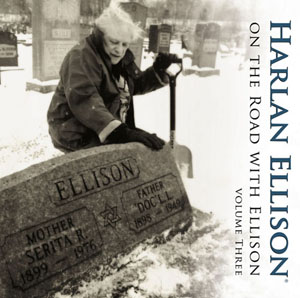

Live album by Harlan Ellison
- Released: 2007
- Recorded: 1991–1993
- Genre: Spoken word, comedy
- Length: 76:58
- Label: Deep Shag Records
- Producer: Michael Reed

Harlan Ellison chronology
On the Road with Ellison Volume 2 (2004)	On the Road with Ellison Volume 3 (2007)	On the Road with Ellison Volume 4 (2010)

Released in 2007 by Deep Shag Records, On the Road with Ellison Volume 3 is a collection of humorous and thought provoking moments from the vaults of Harlan Ellison. The CD features a new essay written by Harlan for this release. When Harlan Ellison speaks, no topic is off-limits. This is not Harlan reading his work; it's a collection of interesting observations and stories from his life.

== Track listing ==
1. Opening Shots
2. Down The Escalator W/ Camera In Arizona
3. The Egg & I
4. Watching Me, Myself & Four Ellisons
5. A Cultural Amnesia Nightmare
6. QVC Ya On The Couch
7. A Harlan Chandelier Evening
8. Again With The Quickies
9. A Leprechaun None?
10. Disney Drive-Thru With Pink Slip
11. Mate Expectations
12. Bogart, Books & Bargains
13. Deep Philosophy About The Middle East
14. Him: About Her
15. Observations On The Abyss
