= On the Road with Ellison Volume 6 =

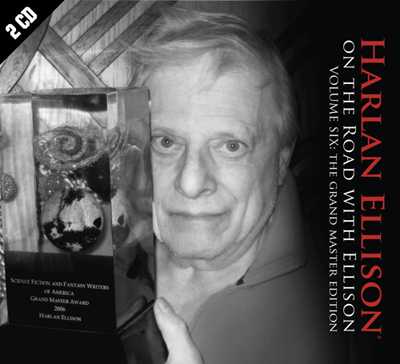

Live album by Harlan Ellison
- Released: 2012
- Recorded: 1977–1995
- Genre: Spoken word, comedy
- Length: 126:16
- Label: Deep Shag
- Producer: Michael Reed

Harlan Ellison chronology
| On the Road with Ellison Volume 5 (2011) | On the Road with Ellison Volume 6 (2012) | On the Road with Ellison Volume 7 (2018) |

On the Road with Ellison Volume Six is the latest report from Harlan Ellison and a life lived on the road. This 2-CD set features an exclusive new essay and Harlan’s historic 2005 Grand Master Award acceptance speech. Volume Six finds the author impersonating a rabbi, getting kicked out of Brazil, offering his thoughts on Star Wars and saying goodbye to his dear friend Octavia Butler. Follow Harlan on the road and get inside the head of America's most outspoken wordsmith. This is Ellison live on stage and anything goes.

== Track listing ==
- Disc one
1. Magellan and I Take Tea at the Roxy
2. Neither Harry S. Truman nor David O. Selznik Had a Middle Name
3. The Finest Man Who Ever Lived, Anywhere, Anytime
4. Oh, Oh, Oblivion!
5. I Babysat Peter David's 9 Year Old Daughter, Caroline Helen Helen
6. Serial Killers Are Just Doughnuts
7. Notes on My Flirtation with Higher Education, or, Taken to the Shedd
8. The Charnel House, the Rotting Swamp, and the Abattoir
9. What Decade Is This?
10. Blahblahblahblah&blah
11. I AM NOT Now, Nor Have I Ever Been Rabbi Rosenthal
12. Get Outta Town Now, Gringo Muthuhfugguh!
13. An Edge In My Voice: Installment #54 - How To Make Life Interesting
- Disc two
1. 2005 Nebula Grandmaster Award: Neil Gaiman introduction
2. Harlan's Grandmaster Acceptance Speech
3. In Memoriam: Octavia E. Butler
