= François Turenne des Pres =

Haitian artist and writer (1907–1990)

François Turenne des Pres (1907–1990) was a Haitian artist and writer born in 1907 in the Caribbean Island of Haiti. He grew up the small village of Jérémie where he was inspired and mentored by many of the local artists. Turenne des Pres traveled and painted extensively between the islands, New York and throughout the South of France where he met his wife Marguerite Turenne Des Pres whose family introduced him to legendary French Impressionist Raoul Dufy who became his mentor, both in France and in New York where the couple finally settled in the mid-1950s.

François Turenne des Pres also collaborated on various writings with actor Danny Kaye including in the 1960s book entitled "Danny Kaye's The World Story Book 104 Legends, Fables, Fairy Tales" where Turenne pens a story on Page 36 "Bouqui And The Enormous Yams". Turenne des Pres exhibited his works all over Europe, the US and the Caribbean Islands. His paintings have earned recognition from art aficionado Jonathan Demme (Academy Award-winning film director - 'Silence of the Lambs' and ‘Philadelphia’). A dozen paintings by François Turenne des Pres are part of the permanent collection at the California Afro-American Museum in Los Angeles (CAAM), alongside those of Hector Hyppolite, the most renowned of all Haitian artists.

Turenne Des Pres’ legacy is also preserved in a collection of 12 folktales in a book "Children of Yayoute: Folk Tales of Haiti." The book was originally published in Haiti in 1949 without illustrations however in 1992 Universe Publishing and Rizolli Books released "Children of Yayoute", a book of François Turenne des Pres’ folktales of Haiti and Caribbean art paired with paintings culled from the more than 300 works executed by Turenne Des Pres.

Collectors of Turenne des Pres’ artwork include legendary lyricist Bernie Taupin, Washington Post columnist Malia Jacobson, Grammy record producer Kamau Kenyatta, famed French attorneys Drujon D’Astros and numerous others all over the world.

== Personal life ==
Francois and Marguerite are parents to Tristan Des Pres and Josquin Des Pres (American musician) and are grandparents to soccer player Sebastien Des Pres.

Turenne des Pres died in 1990 in Riverside County, California.
