= On the Road with Ellison Volume 4 =

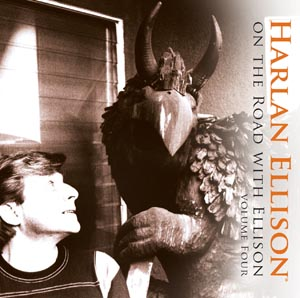

Live album by Harlan Ellison
- Released: 2010
- Recorded: 1982–1995
- Genre: Spoken word, comedy
- Length: 72:44
- Label: Deep Shag
- Producer: Michael Reed

Harlan Ellison chronology
| On the Road with Ellison Volume 3 (2007) | On the Road with Ellison Volume 4 (2010) | On the Road with Ellison Volume 5 (2011) |

Released in 2010 by Deep Shag Records, On the Road with Ellison Volume 4 is a collection of humorous and thought provoking moments from the vaults of Harlan Ellison. The CD features a new essay written by Harlan for this release. When Harlan Ellison speaks, no topic is off-limits. This is not Harlan reading his work; it's a collection of interesting observations and stories from his life.

== Track listing ==
1. A Cautionary Prologue: Slippery, Also Gross, When Wet
2. And How Was Your Year? A Wandering Baedeker
3. How I Came To Be A Pistolero For The Weirdest Guy In The World
4. Babylon Jive, Or, In Straczynski We Trust
5. The Fanged Businessman
6. Quickies: Moments Minus Any Context
7. Mad About Jew
8. One For The Masters: Not a “Rant” - Just Passion Unleashed
9. I Ain’t Rude, I’ve Just Got A Low Bullshit Threshold
10. Philistinism Makes Lucid Copy For Dolts
