= Terence Smith (soccer) =

Barbadian footballer

Personal information
- Date of birth: September 23, 1991 (age 35)
- Place of birth: Windsor, Ontario, Canada
- Height: 1.93 m (6 ft 4 in)
- Position: Defender

Team information
- Current team: Stallion Laguna
- Number: 42

Youth career
- 2007–2010: Toronto Lynx

College career
Years	Team	Apps	(Gls)
2011–2014	Northeastern State RiverHawks	72	(7)

Senior career*
Years	Team	Apps	(Gls)
2010–2014	Toronto Lynx	38	(0)
2016	Tulsa Athletic	17	(1)
2018	Tulsa Roughnecks		
2020–2022	Michigan Stars		
2022–2023	FC Brandenburg		
2023–2024	SV Zehdenick		
2024–	Stallion Laguna	9	(0)
2025	→ Maharlika (loan)	7	(0)

International career
2023–	Barbados	1	(0)
- * Club domestic league appearances and goals as of 11 March 2026

Terence Smith (born September 23, 1991) is a professional soccer player who plays as a defender for Philippines Football League club Stallion Laguna. Born in Canada, he plays for the Barbados national team.

== Early life ==
He was born in Windsor, Ontario and grew up in Brampton. He attended St. John Bosco Elementary school where he played basketball, soccer, and track and field. He attended St. Marguerite d'Youville Catholic Secondary School, where he played football, basketball and soccer. He attended George Brown College in Toronto, for one year earning a diploma in general arts and sciences. He earned a soccer scholarship and went on to earn a Bachelor of Arts degree from Northeastern State University in Oklahoma.

== Club career ==
=== College and amateur ===
Smith played four years of college soccer at Northeastern State University in between 2011 and 2014. During Smith's well decorated career at NSU he was a; 3 x All MIAA, 3 x All Region and 2 x All Daktronic player. From 2012 to 2014 Smith led NSU to its lowest goals against total for 3 straight season's, every year breaking a school record which still stands today. Smith also helped lead NSU to its first MIAA Regular Season Championship and the schools first and only MIAA Conference Tournament Title.

Before and during college, Smith also played for USL Premier Development League side Toronto Lynx between 2010 and 2014. Smith signed for National Premier Soccer League side Tulsa Athletic in 2016 which he was voted into the National Premier Soccer League Supporters’ XI which is an all-league team voted on by the NPSL's fans and supporters.

=== Professional ===
On January 19, 2018, Smith signed with the United Soccer League club Tulsa Roughnecks. He made his professional debut on October 10, 2018, starting in a 1–0 loss to Saint Louis FC.

In 2020, Smith was signed by Michigan Stars FC ahead of their first professional season in the National Independent Soccer Association.

Smith joined Stallion Laguna of the Philippines Football League in 2024.

== International career ==
Smith earned his first call up for Barbados national team for their 2019–20 CONCACAF Nations League qualifying round game on November 18 (2018) vs U.S. Virgin Islands Soccer Federation which they won 3–0. He was then called up a year later for the CONCACAF Nations League qualifiers in October 2019, the team won 1–0 in Barbados.

== Acting and modelling ==
As a preteen, Terence was represented by Minor Details Model and Talent. His print modelling work includes Sears back to school flyer, and a Nelson Educational textbook. He earned acting roles, including that of a student in an AIDS awareness short film which was shown at the XVI International AIDS Conference, 2006 held in Toronto, and a zombie in a 2008 YTV Halloween Promo.

As a teenager and currently he is represented by Applause Bickerton Model and Talent Agency. He has done various print and acting work. During 2019 he appeared in media ads for Backwoods Cigars, TD Music, and Humira. His acting roles include playing a cameraman in the Paranormal Witness series, 2012 episode, The Tenants and a backup dancer in the 2016, Michael Buble music video, Nobody but Me.
