= Tatenda Mkuruva =

Zimbabwean footballer (born 1996)

Personal information
- Full name: Tatenda Marshal Mkuruva
- Date of birth: 4 January 1996 (age 30)
- Place of birth: Harare, Zimbabwe
- Height: 1.87 m (6 ft 2 in)
- Position: Goalkeeper

Team information
- Current team: Detroit City
- Number: 16

Youth career
- 2007–2008: Budiriro Gunners FC
- 2008–2012: Dynamos Juniors

Senior career*
Years	Team	Apps	(Gls)
2013–2016	Dynamos	68	(0)
2017–2018	Cape Town City	12	(0)
2018–2019	Buildcon	20	(0)
2019–2024	Michigan Stars	91	(1)
2025–	Detroit City	0	(0)

International career^{‡}
2012	Zimbabwe U17	11	(0)
2013	Zimbabwe U20	9	(0)
2015	Zimbabwe U23	6	(0)
2015–2017	Zimbabwe	16	(0)
- * Club domestic league appearances and goals as of 2 January 2026 ‡ National team caps and goals as of 23 January 2017

Tatenda Marshal Mkuruva (born 4 January 1996) is a Zimbabwean professional footballer who plays as a goalkeeper for USL Championship club Detroit City FC. He has also represented the Zimbabwe national team.

== Club career ==
=== Youth career ===
Mkuruva began his career with Budiriro Gunners FC (2007–2008) in Harare and joined Dynamos Juniors 2008–2012.

=== Dynamos ===
In 2013, Mkuruva joined Zimbabwe Premier Soccer League club Dynamos on a three-year contract. He made 23 league appearances.

=== Cape Town City ===
In February 2017, he joined Premier Soccer League club Cape Town City on a three-year contract.

=== Buildcon ===
On 2 January 2018, MTN/FAZ Super Division club Buildcon F.C confirmed that they had reached a deal with Mkuruva to sign on a year as free agent.

=== Michigan Stars ===
Mkuruva moved to America after a year in Zambia. In September 2019, he signed with Michigan Stars ahead of their inaugural season in the National Independent Soccer Association. On 19 March 2025, Mkuruva announced via his Facebook that he would not be returning to Michigan Stars FC.

=== Detroit City FC ===
On 25 March 2025, USL Championship club Detroit City FC announced the signing of Mkuruva for the 2025 season with a 2026 option. He did not make any official appearances, and was released at the end of the season. On 6 April 2026 Mkuruva resigned with Detroit City FC for the 2026 campaign.

== International career ==
Mkuruva represented Zimbabwe at the under-17, under-20 and under-23 level before making his senior debut in 2016. He represented Zimbabwe national team at the 2017 Africa Cup of Nations.

== Honours ==
=== Club ===
Dynamos

- Zimbabwe Premier Soccer League: 2013, 2014, 2015
- Mbada Diamonds Cup: 2012–2013
- Zimbabwean Independence Trophy : 2013

Cape Town City

- MTN 8: 2017 : Runners

=== Individual ===
Dynamos

- Rookie of the Year: 2015
- Soccer Star of the Year: 2015
