= UWM Sports Complex =

Soccer stadium in Pontiac, Michigan

Coordinates: 42°37′16″N 83°15′15″W

- Interactive map of UWM Sports Complex
- Location: 867 South Blvd. E. Pontiac, Michigan
- Owner: United Wholesale Mortgage
- Operator: Ultimate Soccer Arenas, Inc.
- Capacity: 5,000
- Surface: AstroTurf GameDay XPE

Construction
- Opened: 2008
- Cost: US$ 13 million (not including the price of the land)

Tenants
- Michigan Stars FC (NISA) (2019–present); Michigan Bucks (PDL) (2008–2018); Detroit Mechanix (AUDL) (2012–2015); Detroit Sun FC (UWS) (2017–2019)

UWM Sports Complex is an multi-purpose sports complex Pontiac, Michigan. The facility houses one of the largest fully enclosed full-size association football arenas in the United States. It features four AstroTurf pitches: three are full-size 110x75-yard pitch, while the fourth is an 85x47-yard pitch. It was formerly known as Ultimate Soccer Arenas. 20,000 square feet.

It has 1,650 permanent seating, a full-service restaurant, a full-service coffee shop, a full service Soccer store and mezzanine level. The ceiling is 72 feet (21 m) tall.

The facility was home of the Michigan Bucks of the USL Premier Development League, a minor-league affiliate of the Columbus Crew of Major League Soccer and the Detroit Sun FC of United Women's Soccer. The Detroit Mechanix of the American Ultimate Disc League use the facility as well.

In 2020, it was acquired by United Wholesale Mortgage for $23.3 million, with the intention to keep the stadium open to the public and also become part of the company's Pontiac, Michigan campus.
