= Sebastien Des Pres =

American soccer player

Personal information
- Full name: Sebastien Francois Turenne Des Pres
- Date of birth: 11 November 1998 (age 28)
- Place of birth: Encinitas, California, United States
- Position: Winger

Youth career
- 2015–2016: Real Salt Lake
- 2017: Blackpool

Senior career*
Years	Team	Apps	(Gls)
2017	Blackpool	0	(0)
2017–2018	Fleetwood Town	0	(0)
2019	Orange County SC	4	(0)
2020	Michigan Stars	4	(0)

International career^{‡}
2016	United States U19	2	(0)
- * Club domestic league appearances and goals as of September 29, 2020 ‡ National team caps and goals as of April 8, 2017

Sebastien Francois Turenne Des Pres (born 11 November 1998) is an American soccer player who last played for Michigan Stars FC in the National Independent Soccer Association.

== Club career ==
Des Pres joined the academy at Real Salt Lake in 2015, scoring two goals in 33 games in the 2015–16 season.

In January 2017, he joined Football League Two side Blackpool on an 18-month contract. He made his debut for the Seasiders in an EFL Trophy game against Wycombe Wanderers on 10 January 2017.

Des Pres joined Fleetwood Town on a 12-month contract in September 2017.

Des Pres joined USL Championship side Orange County SC in December 2018, ahead of their 2019 season.

In July 2020, Des Pres signed with Michigan Stars FC of the National Independent Soccer Association ahead of the fall season. He did not return for the spring 2021 season.

== International career ==
Des Pres has been capped twice by the United States at under-19 level. In April 2017, he was called up to a training camp by the under-20 team ahead of the 2017 FIFA U-20 World Cup. Des Pres is also eligible to play for France.
