= Josquin Des Pres (American musician) =

French-born American musician

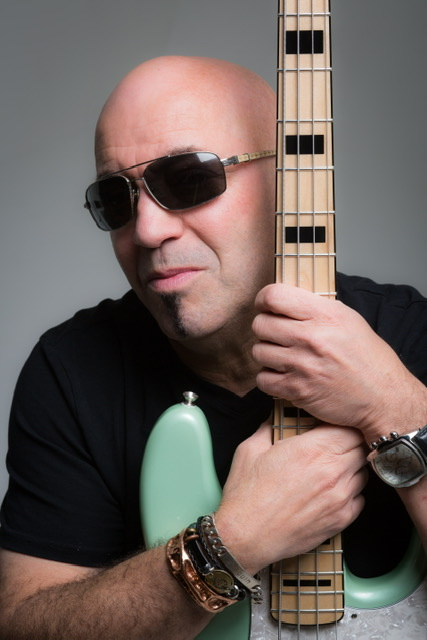
- Des Pres in 2020

Background information
- Born: Josquin Turenne Des Pres; France
- Genres: Progressive rock; melodic hard rock
- Occupations: Musician; Record producer; songwriter; TV composer
- Instrument: Bass guitar
- Years active: mid-1970s–present

Josquin Des Pres (born Josquin Turenne Des Pres) is a French-born American record producer, songwriter, and TV composer who is also known for his composing collaboration with English lyricist Bernie Taupin. He also writes music scores and trailers for more than 40 major TV networks and television shows. Des Pres has contributed to instructional music media books for Hal Leonard and Mel Bay; he has written a vast library of compositions and music techniques on bass, music studies, and various collections, which are used by music teachers, private studies, and in schools, both nationally and internationally, as a standard tool in the music industry.

== Career ==
Des Pres started out in the mid-1970s playing bass professionally in the South of France. He joined progressive rock group Edition Speciale with whom he recorded two albums, including Allée Des Tilleuls (United Artists Records) and Aliquante (RCA Records) in 1975–1977. In the late '70s, Des Pres toured with French jazz violinist Didier Lockwood and then migrated to Los Angeles, California, to play with former Mahavishnu Orchestra violinist Jerry Goodman. In the early 1980s, he formed the melodic hard rock group Stress with guitarist/vocalist Mike Thomas; they were later joined by former Aerosmith guitarist Jimmy Crespo.

In the late 1980s, Des Pres and Bernie Taupin wrote several songs covered by various artists internationally.

== Music producer and bass player ==
Over the last four decades, Des Pres has worked a cast of musicians including songwriter/lyricist Bernie Taupin, singer/songwriter Jason Mraz,Gipsy Kings, Young Dubliners, Slightly Stoopid, Spencer Davis, Jack Johnson, Jax, actress/singer Laura Marano, singer/songwriter Anna Danes, American Idol alumni Makayla Phillips and Rayvon Owen, French singers Michel Polnareff and Joyce Jonathan, drummers Kenny Aronoff, Aaron Sterling, Jeff Porcaro, Vinnie Colaiuta, Marco Minnemann, and Alex Acuña; Tower of Power drummer David Garibaldi, Little Feat drummer Richie Hayward, Sly and the Family Stone drummer Greg Errico, guitarists Steve Lukather, Jennifer Batten, Jerry Donahue, John Jorgenson, Fred Tackett, Don Preston, and Pat Benatar, guitarist and co-writer Scott St. Clair Sheets, bassists Bunny Brunel, Stanley Clarke, Billy Sheehan, country singer-songwriter Charley Pride.

He also produced and co-wrote the album The Gypsy Swing AllStars featuring John Jorgensen and Charlie Bisharat and Jamie Reno's album featuring Peter Frampton, Dickey Betts, Skunk Baxter, Charlie Daniels, Ricky Skaggs and Randy Meisner. Des Pres is also the owner and record producer of Track Star Studios in La Mesa, California.

== Personal life ==
Des Pres is the son of Haitian artist and writer François Turenne des Pres.

== Songs written with Bernie Taupin ==
- Black on Blue
- Destiny
- Dollhouse
- Heart of Glass
- In the Names of Dark Angels
- Radiate
- Red Neck Male
- So Much Love
- The Backstairs
- The Last to Know
- Turn Back the Hands of Time
- Waitress in a Roadhouse
- You Freed Me

== Discography ==
- "Loukas" Soy Tuyo Mi Amor Utonium Music / Virgin Music Group / Prisound 2026
- "Loukas" Soy Tuyo Utonium Music / Virgin Music Group / Prisound 2025
- "Warrior X" I Am The Sea feat. Jennifer Batten and Marco Minnemann 2023
- "Bunny Brunel / Stanley Clarke" Bass Ball 2 NIkaia Records 2023
- "Jason Mraz/Joyce Jonathan" A La Vie Comme A La Mort 2100 Records JoNa Music Group 2021
- "Jason Mraz/Reneé Dominique" Could I Love You Any More Virgin Records / Universal 2019
- "Bunny Brunel / Stanley Clarke" Bass Ball NIkaia Records 2018
- "Mario Olivares" Radio Nostalgia 2 Mario Olivares Music 2014
- "Cindy Lee Berryhill" Music is Love Route 61 Music 2013
- "Jacqueline Grace Lopez" This Christmas J Glo Records 2012
- "Gypsy Swing AllStars" feat. John Jorgensen Allegro Media Group 2010
- "21AD" Christmas, A Winter's Love Allegro Media Group 2010
- "Mario Olivares" Radio Nostalgia Mario Olivares Music 2009
- "Jacqueline Grace Lopez" A Global Soul J Glo Records 2009
- "Jack Johnson & Danny Riley" Hallelujah Indie Release 2008
- "Jack Johnson & Danny Riley" Conversation Indie Release 2007
- "Deirdre Hughes" Deirdre Hughes Satchel Catch Records 2007
- "Joey Pearson" Authentic Track Star Entertainment 2006
- "Gipsy Kings" Mira La Chica Sony Music 2006
- "Jamie Reno" Greatest Hits 33rd Street Records 2004
- "Joey Pearson" Mirror Image Track Star Entertainment 2004
- "Jamie Reno" All American Music 33 Street Records 2004
- "David Garibaldi" Tower of Funk Track Star Entertainment 2003
- "Deadbolt" Hobo Babylon Cargo Music 2002
- "Deadbolt" Zulu Death Mask Cargo Music 2002
- "Jack Johnson" Latitude 32 Live 94.9 2001
- "Slightly Stoopid" American Roots Live 94.9 2000
- "The Young Dubliners" Red Higher Octave Music 2000
- "Lisa Sanders" Life Takes You Flying Earth Music/Cargo Music, Inc. 1999
- "Deadbolt" Voodoo Trucker Cargo Music 1999
- "Mary Dolan" Another Holy Day Earth Music/Cargo Music, Inc. 1998
- "The Young Dubliners" Alive, Alive'O Earth Music/Cargo Music, Inc. 1998
- "Basses Influences" Volume 2 XIII BIS Records 1998
- "Tristan Des Pres" World Affair Muffin Records 1997
- "Scott Sheets" St. Clair MTM Music 1997
- "Lisa Sanders" Isn't Life Fine Cargo Music / MCA Records 1997
- "Conglomerate" Armaghetto Earth Music/Cargo Music, Inc. 1995
- "Steve Harris" Pebble Earth Music/Cargo Music, Inc. 1995
- "Yves Choir" By Prescription Only Musidisc 1989
- "Jimmy Martin" The Rhythm of Life Musidisc 1989
- "Fisc" Handle With Care Musidisc 1988
- "Michel Polnareff" Incognito RCA 1985
- "Michel Polnareff" Viens Te Faire Chahuter RCA 1985
- "Stress" Killing Me Night and Day Musidisc / Deep Shag Records 1985
- "Stress" Search For The Fool Musidisc / Deep Shag Records 1985
- "Jean Michel Kajdan" First Step Polydor 1979
- "Edition Speciale" Allée Des Tilleuls RCA 1977
- "Edition Speciale" Aliquante United Artists 1976

== Music instructional works ==
Josquin Des Pres has written, co-written and scored at least 18 books, audio CD's and DVD's regarding the music industry, music tutorials and bass playing. His books are a standard in music instruction worldwide.

- Creative Careers in Music:
- Reality Check: Hal Leonard Publishing
- Bass Fitness: Hal Leonard Publishing
- Guitar Fitness: Hal Leonard Publishing
- Slap Bass Essentials: Hal Leonard Publishing
- Muted Grooves For Bass: Hal Leonard Publishing
- Simplified Sight Reading For Bass: Hal Leonard Publishing
- Fretless Bass: Hal Leonard Publishing
- Hip Hop Bass: Hal Leonard Publishing
- 70's Funk and Disco Bass: Hal Leonard Publishing
- First Bass: Hal Leonard Publishing
- J.S. Bach For Bass: Mel Bay Publications
- Classical Masterpieces For Bass: Mel Bay Publications
- Daily Chop Builders For Bass: Mel Bay Publications
- Encyclopedia of Bass Riffs: Mel Bay Publications
- The New Sound of Funk Bass: Mel Bay Publications
- Essential Reading Skills For Guitar: Alfred Music
- Classic Funk and R&B Bass:

== Television ==
Josquin Des Pres has written music and themes for the following TV Shows and TV Networks: Ellen de Generes, The Bachelor, American Idol, Tyra Banks, George Lopez Show, Anderson Cooper, TMZ, Extra, American Chopper, Pawn Stars, Deadliest Catch, The Today Show, World's Strongest Man, American Heroes, Shahs of Sunset, Ladies of London, Teen Titans, Impractical Jokers etc. MTV Networks (Catfish, The Seven, When I Was Seventeen, Cribs, Pimp My Ride, Teen Mom, True Life, 10 on Top etc.) CNN, NBC, HGTV, TBS, Bravo, Food Network, Animal Planet, Discovery Channel, History Channel, Travel Channel, CBS, Viacom, VH1, ABC, BET, KPBS, TLC, CW Network, Miss Universe etc.

== Associated record labels ==
- United Artists Records
- RCA records
- Cargo Records
- MCA Records
- Musea Records
- EMI Publishing
- Virgin Records
- Virgin Music Group
- Universal Music Group
- My Major Company
- Warner Chappell Publishing
- Warner Brothers Television
- Riptide Music Group
