= Travis Ward (soccer) =

American soccer player

Personal information
- Date of birth: May 9, 1996 (age 30)
- Place of birth: New Egypt, New Jersey, United States
- Height: 1.86 m (6 ft 1 in)
- Position: Defender

College career
Years	Team	Apps	(Gls)
2014–2017	Rowan Profs	72	(29)

Senior career*
Years	Team	Apps	(Gls)
2018	Philadelphia Fury	10	(4)
2019	Greenville Triumph	14	(1)
2020	Michigan Stars	2	(1)
2021	Stumptown AC	2	(0)
2022	Chattanooga FC	19	(1)
- * Club domestic league appearances and goals as of November 8, 2023

Travis Ward (born May 9, 1996) is an American soccer player who currently plays as a defender.

== Early life ==
Raised in the New Egypt section of Plumsted Township, New Jersey, Ward attended New Egypt High School before playing collegiate soccer at Rowan University.

== Club career ==
In November 2018, Ward attended an open tryout for USL League One side Greenville Triumph SC ahead of the team's first season in the new league. It was announced on February 6, 2019, that he, along with fellow standout Dominic Boland, had been signed by the team. Ward made his debut on March 29 in the league's first ever game, coming on as a second half substitution in a 1–0 loss to Tormenta FC. He scored his first professional goal on May 11 against Lansing Ignite and earned Greenville a 1–1 draw. On November 11, Greenville announced it had declined an option on re-signing Ward.

On February 21, 2020, Ward was announced as a new player by Michigan Stars FC ahead of its first season in the National Independent Soccer Association. He scored the first professional goal in the team's history on March 7 in a 2–1 loss to Oakland Roots SC.

In April 2021, Ward joined Stumptown AC ahead of the spring 2021 season.
