= Alexander Strehmel =

German football manager (born 1968)

Personal information
- Date of birth: 20 March 1968 (age 58)
- Place of birth: Hann. Münden, West Germany
- Height: 1.84 m (6 ft 0 in)
- Positions: Defender; midfielder

Team information
- Current team: SSV Reutlingen (head coach)

Youth career
- SV Bonlanden
- SV Hoffeld
- TSV Birkach
- SSV Plittersdorf
- –1986: VfB Stuttgart

Senior career*
Years	Team	Apps	(Gls)
1986–1994	VfB Stuttgart	157	(5)
1994–1996	SG Wattenscheid 09	41	(0)
1996–2004	SpVgg Unterhaching	208	(10)
2004–2005	FC Augsburg	8	(0)
Total		414	(15)

International career
1988–1990	West Germany U-21	8	(0)

Managerial career
- 2019–2022: Michigan Stars
- 2022–2024: SSV Vorsfelde
- 2024–: SSV Reutlingen
Medal record
Representing West Germany
Men's football
FIFA World Youth Championship
Runner-up	1987 Chile
- * Club domestic league appearances and goals

Alexander Strehmel (born 20 March 1968) is a German football manager and a former professional player who is the head coach of SSV Reutlingen. During his playing career, he positioned as a defender or midfielder.

== Club career ==
Strehmel began his career with VfB Stuttgart, and broke into the first team during the 1986–87 season, in which he made sixteen appearances in the Bundesliga. He continued to play steadily over the next few years, and helped the club to the 1989 UEFA Cup Final, although he missed the entire second half of the 1988–89 season, including final itself (a defeat against Napoli). Three years later came the greatest success of Strehmel's career as Stuttgart won the Bundesliga title. He made 25 appearances during the season, as the club overhauled Eintracht Frankfurt and Borussia Dortmund with a 4–2 win over the latter on the last day of the season to become German champions. Strehmel played in the match as a late substitute for Andreas Buck, with the score at 3–1.

By the 1993–94 season, Strehmel was used less frequently (only thirteen appearances), so he left Stuttgart in July 1994, after over 150 league appearances for the club. He signed for SG Wattenscheid 09 of the 2. Bundesliga, where he spent two seasons, the second of which saw the club relegated in last place. Strehmel stayed in the second tier, though, signing for SpVgg Unterhaching.

In the 1998–99 season, Unterhaching finished in second place, earning promotion to the Bundesliga, where they would spend the next two seasons. The first season they finished a very respectable tenth, and were involved in another dramatic title race - their 2–0 win over Bayer Leverkusen on the last day of the season handing the German championship to their neighbours Bayern Munich. However, Unterhaching finished 16th the following season, and this relegation was followed by another - they finished 15th in the 2. Bundesliga and were relegated to the Regionalliga Süd. They immediately bounced back as champions, before Strehmel left the club midway through the 2003–04 season, returning to the Regionalliga Süd to join FC Augsburg. He retired from football at the end of the 2004–05 season, after only eight appearances in eighteen months for Augsburg.

== International career ==
Strehmel was part of the West Germany under-20 team that went to the 1987 FIFA World Youth Championship in Chile. He played in all six matches as West Germany reached the final, scoring once in a group game against Saudi Arabia. He also scored a penalty in the shoot-out in the final against Yugoslavia, but West Germany lost 5–4. Strehmel also won 8 caps for the under-21 team between 1988 and 1990.

== Coaching career ==
Since retiring from football, Strehmel has been a coach, usually working as assistant to Lorenz-Günther Köstner, who had been his manager at SpVgg Unterhaching. The pair have worked at Rot-Weiss Essen, TSG 1899 Hoffenheim, and VfL Wolfsburg II.

He became coach at Michigan Stars FC of the National Independent Soccer Association, the US third tier.

In 2022, he returned to coaching in Germany, becoming head coach of SSV Vorsfelde. In 2024, he was appointed head coach of SSV Reutlingen. He extended his contract with the club in May 2025.

== Honours ==
VfB Stuttgart

- UEFA Cup finalist: 1989
- Bundesliga: 1992
