= Peter Himmelman =

American singer-songwriter (born 1959)

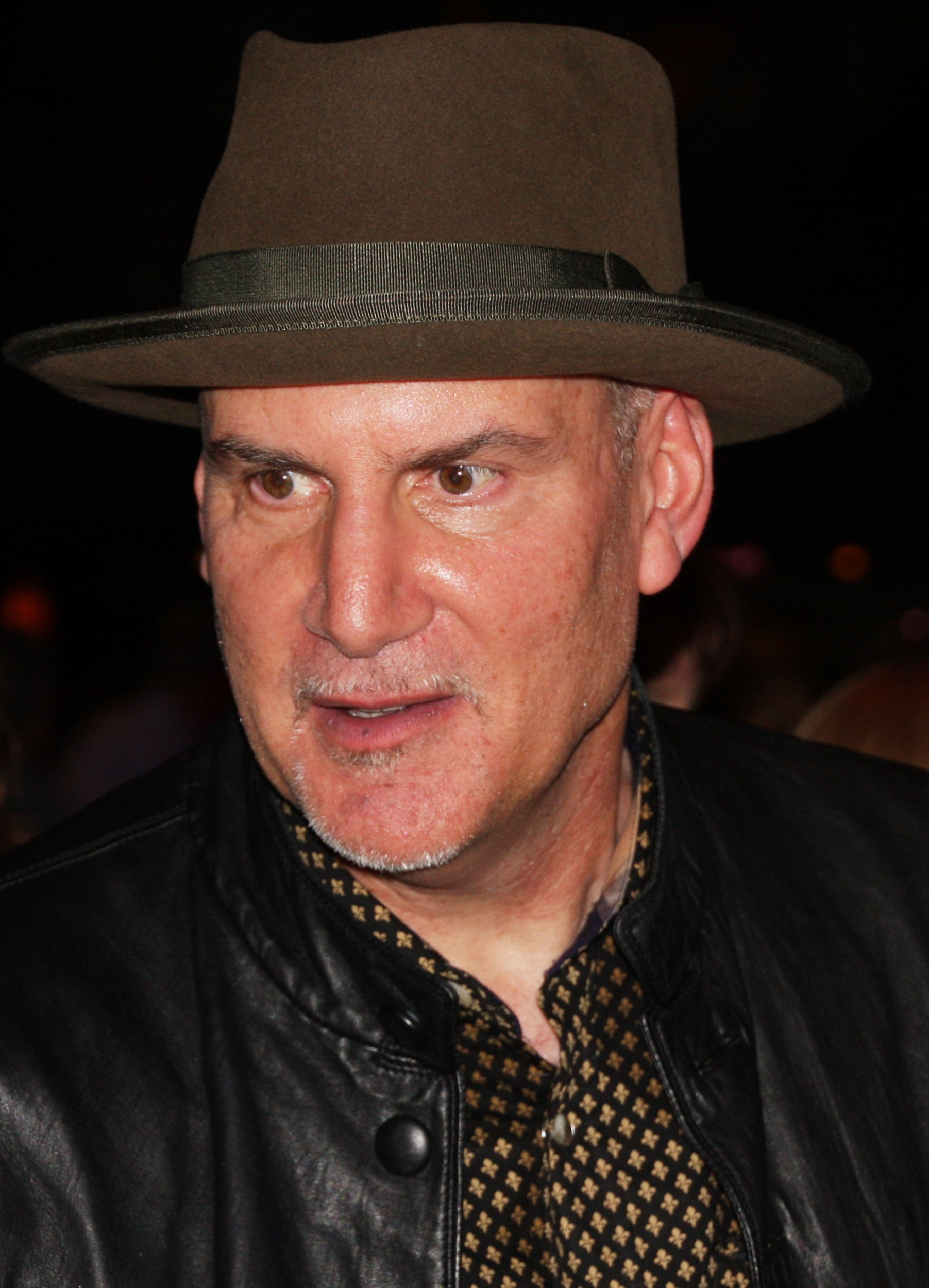

Background information
- Born: November 23, 1959 (age 66); St. Louis Park, Minnesota, U.S.
- Genres: Rock, folk rock, folk, blues
- Occupations: Singer-songwriter, composer, speaker
- Instruments: Vocals, guitar, piano, bass
- Years active: 1980–present
- Label: Himmasongs
- Formerly of: Sussman Lawrence
- Website: peterhimmelman.com www.bigmuse.com

Peter Himmelman (born November 23, 1959, in St. Louis Park, Minnesota) is an American singer-songwriter, musician, and film and television composer from Minnesota, who formerly played in the Minneapolis indie rock band Sussman Lawrence before pursuing an extensive solo career.

== Career ==
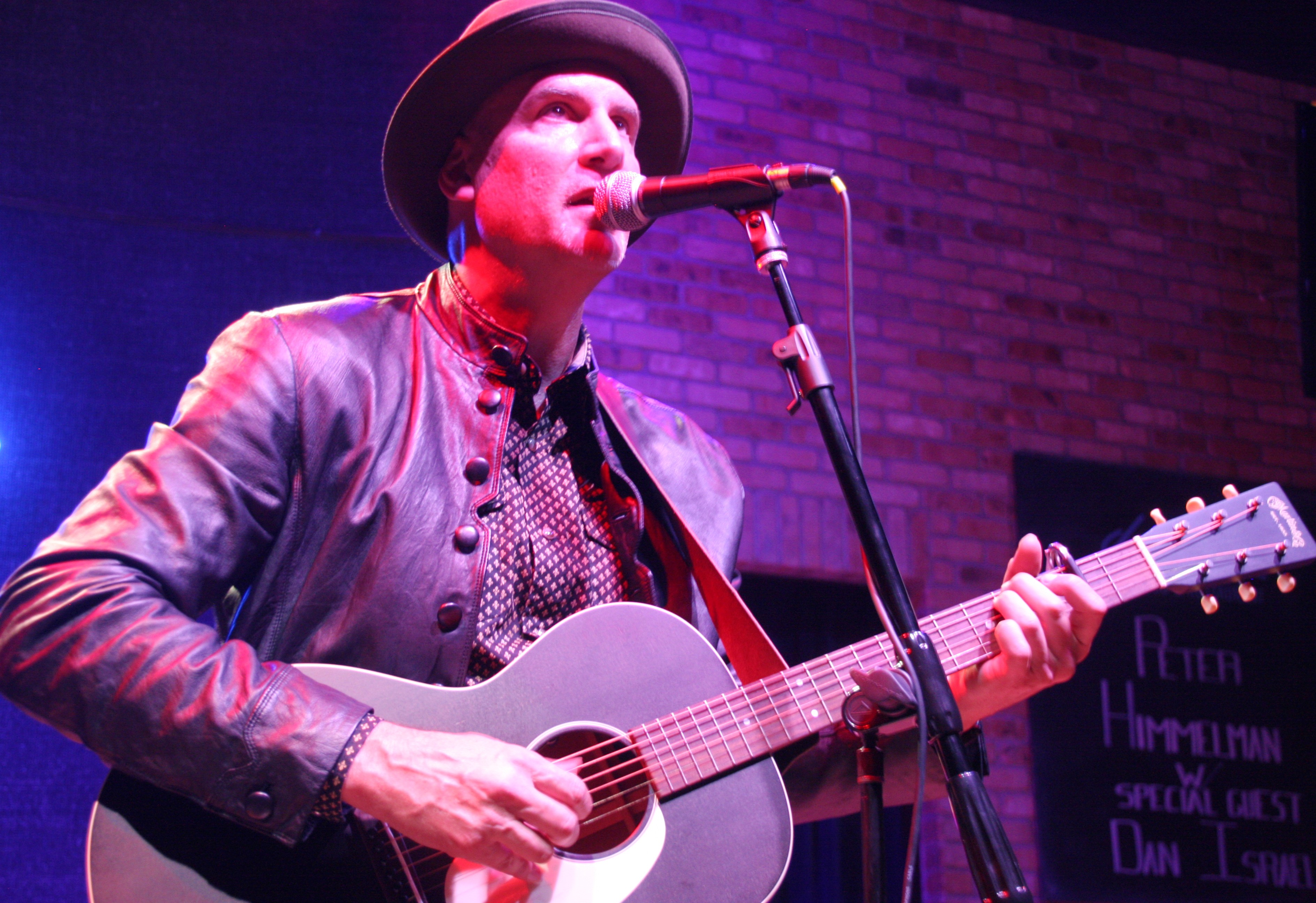
Himmelman in 2017 at the Dakota Jazz Club in Minneapolis

Himmelman garnered his first solo deal on Island Records in 1985 after a video for the song "Eleventh Confession" made its way onto regular rotation on MTV. His first release, This Father's Day, was composed for his father, David. In the early '90s, he achieved significant alternative radio play with songs including "The Woman With The Strength of 10000 Men", from his From Strength To Strength release. He was nominated for an Emmy Award in 2002 for his song "Best Kind of Answer", which appeared in the CBS series Judging Amy, for which he also composed the score. He was the composer for the FOX television show Bones through the fourth season. He was nominated for a Grammy Award for his children's album, My Green Kite. USA Today has called Himmelman "one of rock's most wildly imaginative performers" for his often highly improvisational stage shows.

== Big Muse ==
In 2011 Himmelman began working with organizations and brands such as McDonald's, Gap Inc., and Banana Republic to help them achieve better communication, innovation and leadership, via a company he started called Big Muse. The methodology Himmelman created is designed to help organizations increase innovative thinking, team building and leadership ability. Its main metaphor for teaching these skills is songwriting.

== Connection to Daniel Pearl ==
Himmelman met journalist Daniel Pearl briefly at the 9:30 Club in Washington, D.C., in 1995. After Pearl's murder in Pakistan in 2002, Himmelman became deeply engaged with Pearl's story and legacy. He visited Pearl's parents, Judea Pearl and Ruth Pearl, in Encino, California, and wrote the musical tribute "For a Son" in Pearl's honor. He has written about Pearl's legacy in publications including Commentary magazine.

== Personal life ==
Himmelman is married to lawyer Maria Dylan, adopted daughter of Bob Dylan. They have four children.

Himmelman identifies as an Orthodox Jew, prays three times a day, and does not work on the Jewish Sabbath or Jewish holidays. His observance has affected his performing schedule; he declined an invitation to appear on The Tonight Show because the performance would have fallen on Sukkot.

== Discography ==
=== Solo studio albums ===
- 1986: This Father's Day (reissued 1995)
- 1987: Gematria
- 1989: Synesthesia
- 1991: From Strength to Strength
- 1992: Flown This Acid World
- 1994: Skin
- 1999: Love Thinketh No Evil
- 2004: Unstoppable Forces (bonus disc: Himmelvaults, vol. 3)
- 2005: Imperfect World
- 2007: Pigeons Couldn't Sleep (bonus DVD: Rock God – originally titled: Mittin Derinin)
- 2010: The Mystery and the Hum
- 2014: The Boat That Carries Us
- 2017: There Is No Calamity
- 2020: Press On
- 2024: At the Emergence of Stars

=== Band albums ===
- 1978: Shangoya – "Get a Grip" – 7" single
- 1979: Sussman Lawrence – Hail to the Modern Hero (reissued 1980)
- 1984: Sussman Lawrence – Pop City
- 2004: The Complete Sussman Lawrence (1979–1985) (double CD reissue with bonus tracks) (CD, Deep Shag Records)
- 2013: Minnesota – Are You There? (2013)

=== Solo children's albums ===
- 1997: My Best Friend Is a Salamander
- 2000: My Fabulous Plum (re-issued 2004)
- 2004: My Lemonade Stand
- 2007: My Green Kite
- 2009: My Trampoline

=== Live albums ===
- 1996: Stage Diving – Live from The Bottom Line – NY, NY
- 2008: Pen and Ink

=== Greatest hits compilations ===
- 2004: The Complete Sussman Lawrence (1979–1985) (double CD reissue with bonus tracks) (CD, Deep Shag Records)
- 2005: Mission of My Soul, The Best of Peter Himmelman
- 2007: Songs of Folly and Transcendence (1998–2007)
- 2011: Best of Kids Collection: Songs to Make Boring Days Fun

=== Rarities releases ===
- 1998: Himmelvaults, Vol. 1
- 1999: Himmelman Music for Film
- 2002: Himmelvaults, Vol. 2
- 2004: Himmelvaults, Vol. 3 – bundled with Unstoppable Forces
- 2005: Himmelvaults, Vol. 4 Pristine
- 2005: Himmelvaults, Vol. 5 When Grace Collides with Sin
- 2006: Himmelvaults, Vol. 6
- 2007: Himmelvaults, Vol. 7
- 2008: Himmelvaults, Vol. 8
- 2009: Blackout in the Book of Light
- 2011: Flimsy
- 2014: Himmelvaults, Vol. 9

Spinoza Bear Project

In the early 1980s, Himmelman wrote and produced songs for Spinoza Bear, a therapeutic stuffed animal that was used to eliminate the stress of children in hospitals, rape victims, autism sufferers and others. He also provided the voice of the bear.

- 1984: I'm Your Friend and My Name Is Spinoza – Bonding, Opens Communication
- 1985: You Are All You Need To Be – Encouragement, Self Esteem
- 1985: Everybody Needs A Little Tenderness – Ease Anxiety
- 1985: Dream on the Water – Encourage Sleep
- 1986: Do You Wonder – Curiosity, Learning
- 1986: Good Friends – Feelings, Relationships
- 1991: New Beginnings – Relaxation, Healthy Choices
- 1991: Breathing Healthy, Breathing Free – Positive Attitude, Deep Breathing
- 1991: Hold On to Me – Grief and Loss

== Filmography ==
From 2008 to 2010, Himmelman produced a live Internet show, Furious World, broadcast every Tuesday evening from his home studio. The show featured original live music with his band, video segments that ranged from philosophical to comedic, and special guests from the world of technology, music and the arts.

The film Rock God is a documentary about Himmelman directed by Keith Wolf. Tim Townsend of the St. Louis Post-Dispatch wrote about the documentary in the context of Himmelman's Orthodox Jewish faith and music career.

== Film and TV composition credits ==
TV scoring credits

- Bones (FOX)
- Judging Amy (CBS) – Emmy-nominated song "Best Kind of Answer"
- Men in Trees (ABC)
- Ex List (CBS)
- Heartland (TNT)
- Freshmen Diaries (Showtime)
- The American Embassy (FOX)
- Going to California (Showtime)
- Making the Band 4 (MTV)
- Bug Juice (Disney)
- ER – Season 9 – "A Thousand Cranes" (NBC): "Always in Disguise", from the album Flown This Acid World
- Miami Vice – Season 3 – "Lend Me an Ear" (NBC)
- How To Rock (Nickelodeon)

Film music and scoring credits

- Ash Tuesday – Janeane Garofalo
- Four Feet
- The Souler Opposite – Chris Meloni, Tim Busfield
- Bill's Gun Shop
- A Slipping-Down Life – Guy Pearce, Lili Taylor
- Dinner & Driving – Joey Slotnick, Paula DeVico, Sam Robards, Brigitte Bako
- Liar's Poker – Flea
- Crossing the Bridge – Jason Gedrick, Stephen Baldwin, David Schwimmer
- Pyrates – Kevin Bacon, Kyra Sedgwick
- Queen Sized – Nikki Blonsky
- Porn 'n Chicken
- Snow in August
- A Face to Kill For – Doug Savant, Crystal Bernard
- Long Gone – Dermot Mulroney
- Heart of Dixie – Ally Sheedy, Phoebe Cates, Treat Williams

== Visual art and writing ==
Himmelman is also a visual artist and painter whose work appeared on the cover of his 1987 Island release Synesthesia. A collection of his recent art can be found online. Himmelman is also a poet and essayist, making many contributions to the philosophy blog Feed Your Head.
