= Michigan Stars FC =

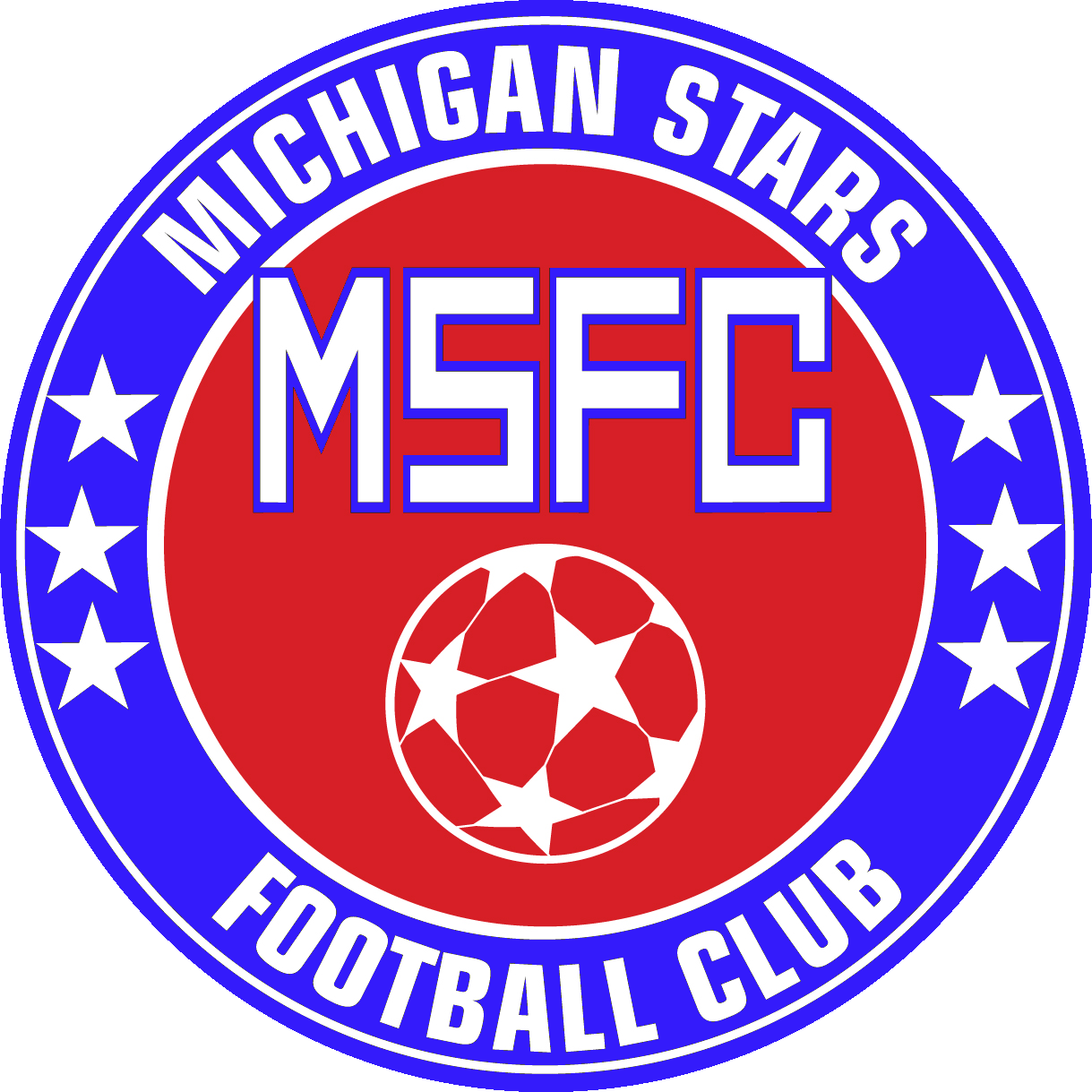
- Full name: Michigan Stars Football Club
- Nickname: Stars
- Founded: 1998; 28 years ago
- Stadium: Barnabo Field
- Capacity: 5,000
- Owner: George Juncaj
- Head Coach: Enis Dokovic
- League: NISA
- 2024: 2nd of East Conference; Playoffs: lost on semifinals
- Website: mi-stars.com
Home colors	Away colors

Michigan Stars Football Club is an American professional soccer team based in the Metro Detroit area. The team currently competes in the National Independent Soccer Association (NISA). The Michigan Stars play their home games at the 5,000-capacity Barnabo Field in Michigan.

== History ==
The club was established circa 1998 as Windsor Spartans FC in Windsor, Ontario, Canada. In 2012, the team moved to the Metro Detroit area in Michigan, and joined the National Premier Soccer League as FC Sparta Michigan for the 2013 season. In January 2014, the team was purchased by Dearborn Sports Enterprise (DSE) and rebranded as Michigan Stars FC.

The team went on hiatus for the 2018 season, and during this time, George Juncaj purchased a 50% stake in the club. The team returned for the NPSL 2019 season and the 2019 NPSL Members Cup. In the beginning of September, Juncaj purchased the remaining 50% of the club and on September 21, 2019, Michigan Stars FC were announced as a National Independent Soccer Association expansion team that would take part in the Spring half of the league's 2019–20 season. Following the 2024 NISA season, the team has been inactive and in an unofficial period of hiatus.

== Players and staff ==
=== Current roster ===
As of March 25, 2025

Note: Flags indicate national team as defined under FIFA eligibility rules; some limited exceptions apply. Players may hold more than one non-FIFA nationality.

No.	Pos.	Nation	Player
1	GK	USA	Lucas Morefield
2	DF	CHI	Sebastian Capozucchi
3	DF	USA	Sacko Konate
4	DF	USA	Robert Juncaj
5	GK	USA	Brandon Roeske
6	MF	USA	Justin Jun
7	MF	USA	Steven Juncaj
8	DF	USA	Braydon Walker
9	FW	NIG	Praise Maduekwe
10	MF	USA	Daniel Wright
12	MF	USA	Kyle Healy

No.	Pos.	Nation	Player
13	DF	FRA	Niels Lellouch
14	MF	USA	Colin Stripling
15	DF	VEN	Andrés Chalbaud
17	FW	USA	Nicolas Nikolla
20	MF	USA	Hunter Olson
22	MF	USA	Elias McCloud
23	FW	USA	Nathan Brown
26	DF	HAI	Pierre San Rabens
27	FW	BIH	Leon Maric
98	GK	USA	Michael Harre

== U-23 Team ==
Michigan Stars U23 is the under-23 development team of Michigan Stars FC. The team competes in the Midwest Premier League, a regional semi-professional league that provides a competitive platform for emerging talent across the Midwest. Serving as a bridge between the club’s academy system and its senior professional team, Michigan Stars U23 focuses on player development and preparing athletes for higher levels of competition

== Year-by-year ==
Season	League	Div.	Pos.	Pl.	W	D	L	GS	GA	Pts.	Playoffs	U.S. Open Cup	Top goalscorer		Manager
Season	League	Div.	Pos.	Pl.	W	D	L	GS	GA	Pts.	Playoffs	U.S. Open Cup	Name	Goals	Manager
2013	NPSL	Midwest-Great Lakes	5th	12	2	2	8	10	34	8	Did not qualify	Not Eligible			
2014	NPSL	Midwest-Great Lakes West	4th	14	4	1	9	17	31	13	Did not qualify	Did not qualify			
2015	NPSL	Midwest	9th	12	4	1	7	17	21	13	Did not qualify	Did not qualify			(United States) Mark Christensen
2016	NPSL	Midwest-Great Lakes West	3rd	12	5	4	3	17	13	19	Did not qualify	Did not qualify			(England) Andy Wagstaff
2017	NPSL	Midwest-Great Lakes	5th	14	3	6	5	26	30	15	Did not qualify	Did not qualify			Morris Lupenec
2018	On Hiatus														
2019	NPSL	Midwest-Great Lakes	6th	14	3	5	6	14	17	14	Did not qualify	Did not qualify			(Montenegro) George Juncaj
2019	NPSL	NPSL Members Cup	5th	10	2	2	6	9	17	8	Did not qualify	Did not qualify			(Montenegro) George Juncaj
2019–20 Spring (Note: Spring season cancelled before completion)	NISA		8th	2	0	0	2	1	3	0	Canceled	Canceled	(United States) Travis Ward	1	(Germany) Alexander Strehmel
2020–21 Fall	NISA	Eastern	2nd	4	2	2	0	6	2	8	Group stage	Canceled	(United States) Kyle Nuel	2	(Germany) Alexander Strehmel
2020–21 Spring	NISA		8th	8	1	2	5	5	12	5	Did not qualify	Canceled	(United States) Kyle Nuel	2	(Germany) Alexander Strehmel
2021	NISA		7th	18	5	6	7	24	24	21	Did not qualify	Canceled	(United States) Leon Maric (United States) Kyle Nuel	5	(Germany) Alexander Strehmel
2022	NISA		3rd	23	10	8	5	27	15	38	Champions	Second round	(Greece) Vasilios Zogos	5	(United States) Trevor Banks
2023	NISA		2nd	24	13	7	4	37	21	46	Runners-up	Second round	(Bosnia and Herzegovina) Leon Maric	14	
2024	NISA	East	2nd	20	11	3	6	38	25	36	Semifinals	Third round	(Bosnia and Herzegovina) Leon Maric	5	(Montenegro) Enis Dokovic
