= 2022 Flower City Union season =

Flower City Union
2022 season
- Owner: Jimmy Paola
- Head coach: Zach Agliata (until May 3); Colton Bly (interim)
- Stadium: Marina Auto Stadium
- NISA: 10th
- NISA Playoffs: Did not qualify
- U.S. Open Cup: Third round
- Independent Cup: Northeast Champions
- Top goalscorer: League: Canas-Jarquin (2); All: Fernandes (5)
- Average home league attendance: 880
- Biggest win: 1–0 (vs. WMP (A), April 6, USOC)
- Biggest defeat: 1–6 (vs. MBFC (A), April 2, NISA)
Home colors	Away colors

The 2022 Flower City Union season was the club's first season of existence, and their first in the National Independent Soccer Association (NISA), the third tier of American soccer. The Union's season began on March 26, 2022, and concluded on October 10, 2022.

The Union finished at the bottom of the NISA table.

== Background ==
The club's history begins in 2017, when the long-time professional soccer club in the Rochester metropolitan area, the Rochester Rhinos announced they were going on a hiatus beginning in 2018. The hiatus left the city without a professional soccer team for the first time since 19985, and left the city's soccer-specific stadium, Marina Auto Stadium, without a main tenant.

In 2020, a ownership group headed by David Weaver, the CEO and founder of Rochester-based Aphex BioCleanse Systems Inc. and a former Kodak optical engineer, submitted an application for a NISA team in Rochester. Mark Washo, a former Chief Business Officer with the Rhinos was appointed as Managing Director and Chief Commercial Officer and the group later announced a partnership with St. John Fisher College’s Sport Management Department.

On December 17, 2020, NISA approved the group's expansion application, and the following day, it was revealed that the club's name would be the Flower City Union, a nod to Rochester's nickname as the Flower City. On April 14, 2021, the team logo and colors were introduced, the primary color being Lilac purple in honor of Rochester's signature flower.

== Club ==
=== Team management ===
Position	Name
Owner	(United States) Jimmy Paola
Vice Chairman	(United States) Mark Washo
Vice President of Business Operations	(United States) Andrew Hoyt
Director of Marketing	(United States) Nina Korn
Director of Corporate Partnerships	(United States) Casey Catlin
Director of Fan Engagement	(United States) Casey Catlin
Digital Coordinators	(United States) Ben Conrow (United States) Adam Drake
Operations Managers	(United States) Logan Adams (United States) Ryan Adams
Head coach	(United States) Jordan Sullivan
Assistant coach	(United States) Nelson Cupello
Goalkeeping coach	(Brazil) Marcelo Moreira

=== Roster ===
No.	Name	Games played	Games Started	Goals	Yellow	Red	Minutes
Outfield Players
2	Benjamin Watson	9	4	0	1	0	379
3	Alex Ainscough	22	18	0	1	0	1,639
4	Andriy Demydiv	11	9	0	1	0	873
5	Nikkyi De Point	21	19	0	1	0	1,745
6	Andrea Pregoni	9	3	0	2	0	368
7	Jay Yun Lee	22	11	2	2	0	925
8	Jordan Saling	19	16	0	3	0	1,451
9	Arion Sobers-Assue	17	10	2	2	0	916
10	Giancarlo Canas-Jarquin	23	18	3	2	0	1,438
11	Jose Sierra	8	4	0	2	0	408
12	Colin Muller	21	17	0	1	0	1,528
14	Quinton Carey	13	4	0	1	0	456
15	Robert Williamson	7	7	0	3	0	558
17	Hunter Kassel	1	0	0	0	0	22
19	Suniel Veerakone	22	21	1	4	0	1,896
20	Dylan Evande	5	4	1	2	1	378
21	Ozlo Riley	2	0	0	2	0	69
22	Mitchell Brickman	15	15	0	6	0	1,346
23	Lukas Fernandez	19	17	5	1	0	1,494
24	Marcus Micheletti	18	11	0	1	1	1,065
25	Grant Michaels	4	4	0	0	0	353
42	Andre Deas	22	17	0	0	0	1,534
71	Noah Cavanaugh	7	5	0	0	0	412
77	Michael Cunningham	4	3	0	2	0	242
82	Ryan Curtis	9	3	1	0	0	418
88	Auston Kranick	23	20	0	4	0	1,766
2024 Goalkeepers
No.	Name	Games played	GA	GA	Minutes		
0	Missing Info						
1	Missing Info						

- Stats include US Open Cup and NISA regular season matches. They do not include NISA Independent Cup stats.

== Non-competitive ==
September 7	Flower City Union	0–6	Syracuse Pulse	Rochester, NY
8:30 p.m. EDT		Report		Stadium: Marina Auto Stadium

== Competitions ==
=== NISA ===
==== Season Recap ====
The season began with Zach Agliata at the helm. After a string of poor result, he was replaced by Colton Bly, who was given the interim tag.

==== Standings ====
Pos	Team	Pld	W	D	L	GF	GA	GD	Pts	PPG	Qualification
1	California United Strikers FC	21	14	4	3	35	12	+23	46	2.19	Qualification for the semi-finals
2	Chattanooga FC	24	14	7	3	44	21	+23	49	2.04	Qualification for the semi-finals
3	Michigan Stars FC	23	10	8	5	27	15	+12	38	1.65	Qualification for the play-offs
4	Albion San Diego	20	9	5	6	28	23	+5	32	1.60	Qualification for the play-offs
5	Maryland Bobcats FC	23	8	6	9	32	28	+4	30	1.30	Qualification for the play-offs
6	Syracuse Pulse	22	7	4	11	26	32	−6	25	1.14	Qualification for the play-offs
7	Los Angeles Force	20	2	8	10	14	31	−17	14	0.70	
8	Flower City Union	23	2	3	18	13	57	−44	9	0.39	

Source: nisasoccer.com
Rules for classification: 1) points; 2) goal differential; 3) goals scored; 4) head-to-head

==== Results summary ====
Overall								Home						Away					
Pld	W	D	L	GF	GA	GD	Pts	W	D	L	GF	GA	GD	W	D	L	GF	GA	GD
21	2	3	16	13	54	−41	9	1	1	8	6	23	−17	1	2	8	7	31	−24

Last updated: September 2, 2022.
Source: Flower City Union

==== Match results ====
March 26 1	Flower City Union	0–1	Syracuse Pulse	Rochester, NY
12:00 p.m. EDT	Saling (yellow card) 55'; Brickman (yellow card) 71'	Report	Jackson 48'; DaSilva (red card) 58'; MacDonald (yellow card) 75'	Stadium: Rochester Community Sports Complex; Attendance: 880

April 2 2	Maryland Bobcats	6–1	Flower City Union	Boyds, MD
4:00 p.m. EDT	Amo 13'; Espinal 29'; Solomon 56', 63'; Amo 72'; Brickman 90+2' (o.g.)	Report	Veerakone (yellow card) 17'; Canas-Jarquin 58'	Stadium: Maryland SoccerPlex; Attendance: UNK; Referee: Gary Gutierrez, Max Smith, Scarlet Agrawal, Steven Foster

April 9 3	Flower City Union	0–3	Michigan Stars	Rochester, NY
12:00 p.m. EDT	Brickman (yellow card) 60'	Report	Firmino 32'; Mujan (yellow card) 37'; Constant 40'; Firmino (yellow card) 54'; Brickman (yellow card) 60'; Zhongo 79'	Stadium: Rochester Community Sports Complex; Attendance: UNK

April 23 4	Flower City Union	0–1	Maryland Bobcats	Rochester, NY
3:00 p.m. EDT	Williamson (yellow card) 14'; Kranick (yellow card) 57'; Demydiv (yellow card) 78'	Report	Mason (yellow card) 9'; Majano (yellow card) 19'; Clegg 22'; Espinal (yellow card) 29'; Alvarado (yellow card) 73'; González (yellow card) 90'	Stadium: Rochester Community Sports Complex; Attendance: 477

April 30 5	Chattanooga FC	0–1	Flower City Union	Chattanooga, TN
7:30 p.m. EDT	Gray (yellow card) 57'; Robertson (yellow card) 66'; Stripling (yellow card) 76'	Report	Deas (yellow card) 32'; Fernandes 85'	Stadium: Finley Stadium; Attendance: 3,260

May 4 6	Flower City Union	1–2	California United Strikers	Batavia, NY
7:30 p.m. EDT	Canas-Jarquin 32'; Lee (yellow card) 78'	Report	Nuño 36'; Kadono 61'; Treinen (yellow card) 62'	Stadium: Vandetta Stadium; Attendance: 243
Note: Match played at Vandetta Stadium, Batavia instead of the club's normal stadium, Marina Auto Stadium, Rochester, due to venue conflicts.

May 8 7	Syracuse Pulse	3–1	Flower City Union	Syracuse, NY
7:00 p.m. EDT	Jackson 7'; Kafari (yellow card) 32'; Satrustegui 61'; MacDonald 71'	Report	Ainscough (yellow card) 18'; Fernandes 30'; Kranick (yellow card) 42'; Watson (yellow card) 64'	Stadium: Lazer Stadium

May 14 8	Flower City Union	2–1	Maryland Bobcats	Rochester, NY
3:00 p.m. EDT	Sobers-Assue 32'; Brickman (yellow card) 68'; Canas-Jarquin 78'; Ortega (yellow card) 89'; Demydiv (yellow card) 90+1'; Kranick (yellow card) 90+3'	Report	Boone 49'; Gonzalez (yellow card) 82'	Stadium: Rochester Community Sports Complex; Attendance: 717

May 21 9	Flower City Union	1–5	Chattanooga FC	Rochester, NY
6:00 p.m. EDT	Veerakone 39'; Sobers-Assue (yellow card) 74'; Ortega (yellow card) 85'	Report	Naglestad 12', 34', 37', 86' (pen.); Cerro 14'	Stadium: Rochester Community Sports Complex

May 28 10	California United Strikers FC	1–0	Flower City Union	Irvine, CA
10:00 p.m. EDT	Thierjung 62'; Kadono (yellow card) 75'	Report	Veerakone (yellow card) 9'; Deas (yellow card) 23'	Stadium: Championship Soccer Stadium

June 1 11	Bay Cities FC	3–1	Flower City Union	Redwood City, CA
10:00 p.m. EDT	Paoli 9'; Romero 38' (pen.); Penner 54' (yellow card) 69'	Report	Fernandes 45+2' (yellow card) 59'; Sierra (yellow card) 78'	Stadium: Cañada College Soccer Field

June 4 12	Flower City Union	2–1	Valley United	Rochester, NY
7:00 p.m. EDT	Sobers-Assue 41' (pen.); Fernandes 72'		Gil 61'	Stadium: Rochester Community Sports Complex
Note: Result null and void after Valley United was expelled by the league.

June 11 13	Michigan Stars	3–0	Flower City Union	Romeo, MI
7:00 p.m. EDT	Mkuruva (yellow card) 14'; Juncaj 22', 47'; Marić 66'	Report		Stadium: Romeo Stadium

June 15 14	Flower City Union	0–3	LA Force	Rochester, NY
7:30 p.m. EDT	De Point (yellow card) 82'	Report	Rivas Jr. 7' (yellow card) 21'; McLaughlin 17' (yellow card) 90'; Goñi 59'	Stadium: Rochester Community Sports Complex

June 18 15	Flower City Union	2–2	Albion San Diego	Rochester, NY
7:00 p.m. EDT	Lee 16'; Ainscough (yellow card) 34'; Saling (yellow card) 49'; Fernandes 90+1'	Report	Diakhate 15'; Pelaez (yellow card) 41'; Hanson 69'; Malango (yellow card) 87'; Bazaes (yellow card) 90+6'	Stadium: Rochester Community Sports Complex

July 3 16	Michigan Stars	0–0	Flower City Union	Romeo, MI
7:00 p.m. EDT	McCloud (yellow card) 30'	Report	Lee (yellow card) 71'; Deas (yellow card) 77'	Stadium: Romeo Stadium

July 8 17	Syracuse Pulse	4–0	Flower City Union	Syracuse, NY
7:00 p.m. EDT	Fokam (yellow card) 8' (yellow-red card) 77'; Mckinley 35'; Kafari (yellow card) 43'; Louis 49', 66'; Kwak 59'; Waldrep (yellow card) 86'	Report	Brickman (yellow card) 36'; Muller (yellow card) 48'	Stadium: Lazer Stadium

July 16 18	Flower City Union	0–5	Chattanooga FC	Rochester, NY
EDT	Watson (yellow card) 34'; Kranick (yellow card) 55'; Sobers-Assue (yellow card) 66'	Report	Naglestad 17' (pen.), 33'; Hernandez 35'; Gray 84'; Green 90+1'	Stadium: Marina Auto Stadium

August 13 19	Maryland Bobcats	5–0	Flower City Union	Boyds, MD
7:00 p.m. EDT	Wivell 7'; Espinal 54', 77'; Boone 57', 58'; Boone (yellow card) 71'	Report	Deas (yellow card) 50'; Pregoni (yellow card) 90'	Stadium: Maryland SoccerPlex

August 20 20	Flower City Union	0–2	Syracuse Pulse	Rochester, NY
6:00 p.m. EDT	Pregoni (yellow card) 56'	Report	Kwak 10'; Louis 17'; DaSilva (yellow card) 23'; Jackson (yellow card) 71'	Stadium: Rochester Community Sports Complex

August 27 21	Albion San Diego	2–1	Flower City Union	San Diego, CA
9:00 p.m. EDT	Gabarra 40'; Diakhate 43'; Haupt (yellow card) 59'; Mitchell (yellow card) 83'	Report	Williamson (yellow card) 67'; Evande 85'	Stadium: Canyon Crest Stadium

August 29 22	LA Force	2–2	Flower City Union	Wilmington, CA
10:00 p.m. EDT	Amo (yellow card) 32'; Guerrero 30' (yellow card) 40'; Quintanilla 70'; Tor (yellow card) 82'	Report	Curtis 19' (yellow card) 87'; Lee 26'; Williamson (yellow card) 51'	Stadium: Casey Field

September 7 23	Flower City Union	—	Bay Cities FC	Rochester, NY
8:30 p.m. EDT				Stadium: Rochester Community Sports Complex
Note: Match canceled after Bay Cities FC withdrew from the league.

September 24 24	Chattanooga FC	1-0	Flower City Union	Chattanooga, TN
7:30 p.m. EDT	Naglestad 35' (pen.); Robertson (yellow card) 45'; Stratton (yellow card) 70'; Cerro (yellow card) 76'	Report	Canas-Jarsuin (yellow card) 25'; Brickman (yellow card) 43'; Evande (yellow card) 52' (yellow-red card) 55'	Stadium: Finley Stadium; Attendance: 3,437

October 10 25	Flower City Union	0-2	Michigan Stars	Rochester, NY
3:00 p.m. EDT	Micheletti (yellow card) 24'; Deas (yellow card) 29'; Brickman (yellow card) 53'; Pregoni (yellow card) 90'	Report	Zhongo 24' (pen.); Bowie (yellow card) 37'; Schmelev (yellow card) 74'; Maric 80'; Gvozdic (yellow card) 87'	Stadium: Rochester Community Sports Complex

=== U.S. Open Cup ===
April 6 Second round	Western Mass Pioneers (USL2) (Massachusetts)	0–1 (a.e.t.)	(New York (state)) Flower City Union (NISA)	Ludlow, MA
4:30 p.m. EDT	Gutiérrez (yellow card) 23'; Matera (yellow card) 81'; Freitas (yellow card) 114'	Report	Veerakone (yellow card) 81'; Fernandes 94'; Micheletti (red card) 110'	Stadium: Lusitano Stadium; Attendance: 363; Referee: Jeremy Scheer

April 19 Third round	Flower City Union (NISA) (New York (state))	0–3	(Washington, D.C.) D.C. United (MLS)	Rochester, NY
7:30 p.m. EDT	Ortega (yellow card) 85'	Report	Kamara 73', 86' (pen.); Robertha 81'	Stadium: Marina Auto Stadium; Attendance: 556; Referee: Luis Arroyo

=== NISA Independent Cup ===
June 25 First round	Flower City Union (NISA) (New York (state))	2–0 AET	(New Jersey) NJ Alliance (NISAN)	Rochester, NY
	Veerakone 101', 114'; Canas-Jarquin (yellow card); Muller (yellow card)	Report		Stadium: Mariana Auto Stadium
