= 2019–20 San Diego 1904 FC season =

American soccer club season

San Diego 1904 FC
2019–20 NISA season
- Owner: Demba Ba; Eden Hazard; Vagno Chandara; Alexandre Gontran
- Head coach: Alexandre Gontran
- Stadium: (Fall) SDCCU Stadium; San Diego, CA (Spring) Lincoln HS; San Diego, CA
- NISA: Fall, West Coast Conf.: 3rd Spring: 5th
- Playoffs: Fall: DNQ; Spring: N/A
- Challenge Cup: Loss vs Los Angeles
- U.S. Open Cup: Cancelled
- Top goalscorer: League: Lorenzo Ramirez Jr. (3); All: Lorenzo Ramirez Jr. (3)
- Highest home attendance: 2,838 (September 14 vs. Cal United)
- Lowest home attendance: 749 (March 8 vs. Cal United)
- Average home league attendance: 2,107
- Biggest win: 3–1 (September 14 vs. Cal United)
- Biggest defeat: 3 goals: 0–3 (October 2 vs. Cal United); 1–4 (October 20 vs. Cal United)

The 2019–20 San Diego 1904 FC season was the club's first ever and its first in the newly created National Independent Soccer Association (NISA), a newly established third division soccer league in the United States.

== Overview ==
1904 FC previously attempted to play professionally in both the North American Soccer League and United Soccer League with neither effort coming to fruition. In mid 2018, the team was announced as the first member of the newly established National Independent Soccer Association.

The team announced Alex Gontran as the club's first head coach on August 28, 2019. The team's first game against the Los Angeles Force was played on September 7, 2019 and was for the "NISA Challenge Cup," a trophy contested between neighboring clubs that moves around the league every season. 1904 lost, 0–2, on the road at Rio Hondo Stadium.

1904 played its first home game at SDCCU Stadium on September 14 against California United Strikers FC. In front of a crowd of nearly 3,000, the team won its first league game, 3–1, with a pair of goals by Lorenzo Ramirez Jr. and a third from Billy Garton via a penalty kick. A second win at home the following week over Oakland Roots SC, 4–3, was the last time the team earned points during the fall as it went on to lose its next three games, finished in third place within the conference, and missed the West Coast playoffs.

On April 27, 2020, following a stoppage of play and subsequent extension due to the COVID-19 pandemic, NISA announced the cancellation of the 2020 Spring season.

== Roster ==
=== Players ===
As of March 2, 2020

No.	Position	Nation	Player
2	DF	USA	Alexis Velela
3	DF	USA	Mac Clarke
4	DF	USA	Ozzie Ramos
5	DF	ENG	Josiah Benjamin
6	DF	USA	Dallin Cutler
7	MF	USA	Felipe Liborio
8	MF	USA	Christian Enriquez
9	FW	USA	Lorenzo Ramirez Jr.
10	FW	USA	Ernesto Espinoza
11	FW	SLV	Nelson Blanco
13	DF	USA	Eder Arreola
14	MF	MEX	Brandon Zambrano
16	FW	USA	Adonis Amaya
19	MF	ENG	Billy Garton
21	GK	HAI	Jean Antoine
22	MF	USA	Jesse Vogel
23	FW	USA	Hanif Wright
25	FW	BEN	Don Tchilao
29	DF	USA	Joseph Pérez
98	MF	ENG	Milo Barton
—	GK	CMR	Antony Siaha
—	MF	USA	Diego Esquivel

=== Staff ===
- (France) Alexandre Gontran – Head coach
- (France) Haruna Ba – Physical Trainer
- (France) Johann Kennel – Performance Trainer

== Transfers ==
=== Fall ===
In: Note: Flags indicate national team as defined under FIFA eligibility rules; some limited exceptions apply. Players may hold more than one non-FIFA nationality.

No.	Pos.	Nation	Player
11	FW	SLV	Nelson Blanco (from (United States) North Carolina FC)
13	DF	USA	Eder Arreola (from (United States) Orange County FC)
4	DF	USA	Ozzie Ramos (from (United States) ASC San Diego)
10	FW	USA	Ernesto Espinoza (from (Mexico) Club Tijuana U-20s)
7	MF	USA	Felipe Liborio (from (United States) ASC San Diego)
21	GK	HAI	Jean Antoine (from (United States) ASC San Diego)
3	DF	FRA	Abdoulaye Cissoko (loan from (United States) Tacoma Defiance)
5	DF	ENG	Josiah Benjamin (from (United States) University of San Diego)
19	MF	ENG	Billy Garton (from (United States) University of Portland)
8	MF	USA	Christian Enriquez (from (United States) ASC San Diego)
6	MF	USA	Dallin Cutler (from (United States) ASC San Diego)
2	DF	USA	Alexis Velela (from (United States) ASC San Diego)
14	MF	MEX	Brandon Zambrano (from (Mexico) Real Zamora)
15	DF	USA	Jack Villatoro (from (United States) Loudoun United FC)
16	FW	USA	Adonis Amaya (from Unattached)
17	FW	USA	Jorge Taylor (from Unattached)
18	FW	FRA	Élie Junior Akobeto (from (United States) Atlanta SC)
20	MF	FRA	Nicolas Briere (from (United States) San Diego Zest FC)
22	MF	USA	Jesse Vogel (from Unattached)
23	FW	USA	Hanif Wright (from (United States) San Diego Zest FC)
36	FW	JPN	Kazuma Suzuki (from (United States) San Diego Zest FC)
89	GK	USA	Brent Reis (from Unattached)
98	MF	ENG	Milo Barton (from (United States) Seattle Sounders FC Academy)
99	MF	FRA	Kentin Olive (from (United States) Park City Red Wolves SC)

Out: Note: Flags indicate national team as defined under FIFA eligibility rules; some limited exceptions apply. Players may hold more than one non-FIFA nationality.

No.	Pos.	Nation	Player

=== Spring ===
In: Note: Flags indicate national team as defined under FIFA eligibility rules; some limited exceptions apply. Players may hold more than one non-FIFA nationality.

No.	Pos.	Nation	Player
29	DF	USA	Joseph Pérez (from (Mexico) Club Puebla)
3	DF	USA	Mac Clarke (from (United States) San Diego State Aztecs)
25	FW	BEN	Don Tchilao (from (United States) LA Galaxy II)
—	MF	USA	Diego Esquivel (from Unattached)
—	GK	CMR	Antony Siaha (from (United States) Benedictine Redhawks)

Out: Note: Flags indicate national team as defined under FIFA eligibility rules; some limited exceptions apply. Players may hold more than one non-FIFA nationality.

No.	Pos.	Nation	Player
3	DF	FRA	Abdoulaye Cissoko ((end of loan) to (United States) Tacoma Defiance)
1	GK	USA	Marcus Norris (to Unattached)
15	DF	USA	Jack Villatoro (to Unattached)
17	FW	USA	Jorge Taylor (to Unattached)
18	FW	FRA	Élie Junior Akobeto (to Unattached)
20	MF	FRA	Nicolas Briere (to Unattached)
36	FW	JPN	Kazuma Suzuki (to Unattached)
89	GK	USA	Brent Reis (to Unattached)
99	MF	FRA	Kentin Olive (to Unattached)

== Friendlies ==
August 23, 2019	San Diego Premier SC (UPSL)	3–1	San Diego 1904 FC	San Diego, California
7:00 p.m	Goal	Report	Goal	Stadium: Lincoln High School Stadium

October 5, 2019	San Diego 1904 FC	2–1	San Diego Premier SC (UPSL)	San Diego, California
5:00 p.m	Goal	MyCujoo Broadcast	Goal	Stadium: John Muir Field

October 12, 2019	Club Tijuana Under-20s	2–4	San Diego 1904 FC	Tijuana, Baja California, Mexico
3:00 p.m	Goal	Report	Arreola; Espinoza; Suzuki	Stadium: Estadio Caliente

October 28, 2019	Temecula FC (NPSL)	1–7	San Diego 1904 FC	Temecula, California
6:00 p.m		Report	Zambrano; Suzuki; Blanco; Espinoza; Ramirez Jr.	Stadium: Chaparral High School; Referee: William Delgado

November 17, 2019	White Tigers FC (UPSL)	1–4	San Diego 1904 FC	Ramona, California
3:00 p.m	Goal	Report	Espinoza; Suzuki; Ramirez Jr.	Stadium: Ramona High School
Note: Served as a fundraiser for injured White Tigers' player Armando “Zurdo” Macias.

February 1, 2020	Santa Ana Winds FC (UPSL)	0–1	San Diego 1904 FC	Lake Forest, California
7:00 p.m		Report	Wright	Stadium: Lake Forest Sports Park

February 2, 2020	San Diego Premier SC (UPSL)	0–3	San Diego 1904 FC	Lake Forest, California
7:00 p.m		Report	Wright; San Diego Premier SC (-); Zambrano	Stadium: Lake Forest Sports Park

February 8, 2020	Escondido Mayas FC (UPSL)	0–4	San Diego 1904 FC	Escondido, California
12:00 p.m		Report	Enriquez; Zambrano; Barton; Vergara	Stadium: Orange Glen High School

February 16, 2020	UPSL All-Stars	0–8	San Diego 1904 FC	Danville, California
6:00 p.m		Report	Perez; Ramirez Jr.; Blanco; Barton; Wright; Egeli	Stadium: Monte Vista High School

February 22, 2020	Cal State Fullerton Titans (NCAA)	1–3	San Diego 1904 FC	Fullerton, California
5:30 p.m	Goal	Report	Garton Jr.; Perez; Espinoza	Stadium: Titan Stadium

== Competitions ==
=== NISA Fall season (Showcase) ===
Details for the 2019 NISA Fall season were announced July 25, 2019.

==== Standings ====
Pos	Team	Pld	W	D	L	GF	GA	GD	Pts	Qualification
1	Los Angeles Force	6	3	2	1	8	7	+1	11	West Coast Championship
2	California United Strikers FC (O)	6	2	3	1	13	9	+4	9	West Coast Championship
3	San Diego 1904 FC	6	2	0	4	9	15	−6	6	
4	Oakland Roots SC	6	0	3	3	10	13	−3	3	

Source: NISAofficial.com
(O) Play-off winners

==== Results summary ====
Overall								Home						Away					
Pld	W	D	L	GF	GA	GD	Pts	W	D	L	GF	GA	GD	W	D	L	GF	GA	GD
6	2	0	4	9	15	−6	6	2	0	1	8	6	+2	0	0	3	1	9	−8

Last updated: 2 November 2019.
Source: Match reports

==== Matches ====
September 7, 2019 1	Los Angeles Force	2–0	San Diego 1904 FC	Whittier, California
7:00 p.m	Ruiz 4'; Placito (yellow card) 47'; Canale 61', (yellow card) 76'; Vazquez (yellow card) 65'	MyCujoo Broadcast	Ramos (yellow card) 83'	Stadium: Rio Hondo Stadium; Attendance: 926
Note: First annual NISA Challenge Cup

September 14, 2019 2	San Diego 1904 FC	3–1	California United Strikers FC	San Diego, California
7:04 p.m	Ramirez Jr. 11', 62'; Garton (yellow card) 22', (goal) 52' (pen.); Barton (yellow card) 90+1'	Report; MyCujoo Broadcast	Nuño (yellow card) 9', (goal) 25'; Rincón (yellow card) 75'	Stadium: SDCCU Stadium; Attendance: 2,838; Referee: Samantha Martinzes

September 28, 2019 3	San Diego 1904 FC	4–3	Oakland Roots SC	San Diego, California
7:04 p.m	Garton 25', (yellow card) 83'; Blanco 29'; Ramirez Jr. 45+1'; Amaya 80' (pen.); Arreola (yellow card) 90+6'	MyCujoo Broadcast	Joya (yellow card) 7'; Masch 38', 68'; Christian (red card) 48'; McInerney 90+2'	Stadium: SDCCU Stadium; Attendance: 2,536

October 2, 2019 4	California United Strikers FC	3–0	San Diego 1904 FC	Irvine, California
7:00 p.m.	Thierjung 4'; Contreras 59'; Villalobos 90+1'	Report; MyCujoo Broadcast	Zambrano (yellow card) 53'; Taylor (yellow card) 84'	Stadium: Championship Soccer Stadium; Attendance: 1,102; Referee: Christopher Calderon

October 20, 2019 5	California United Strikers FC	4–1	San Diego 1904 FC	Irvine, California
4:00 p.m.	Nuño 18'; Contreras (yellow card) 45+3', (goal) 52'; Bryant 83'; Thierjung 90'	Report; MyCujoo Broadcast	Ramirez Jr. (yellow card) 31'; Zambrano 71'; Wright (yellow card) 88'; Velela (yellow card) 89'	Stadium: Championship Soccer Stadium; Attendance: 1,620; Referee: Samantha Martinez
Note: Due to the Strikers playing more than six games, this game was not counted towards their standings but did count for San Diego.

November 2, 2019 6	San Diego 1904 FC	1–2	Los Angeles Force	San Diego, California
7:04 p.m	Cissoko (yellow card) 29'; Zambrano (yellow card) 34'; Antoine (red card) 44'; Espinoza 62' (pen.)	MyCujoo Broadcast	Tanko (yellow card) 22'; Madrigal-Zavala 32', 45+3'; Muchiri (yellow card) 48'; Alberto (yellow card) 59'; Perez (yellow card) 60'; Cardenas (yellow card) 72'	Stadium: SDCCU Stadium; Attendance: 2,308

=== NISA Spring Season ===
Details for the 2020 NISA Spring season were announced January 27, 2020.

==== Standings ====
Pos	Team	Pld	W	D	L	GF	GA	GD	Pts	Qualification
1	Oakland Roots SC	2	1	1	0	3	2	+1	4	Playoffs
2	California United Strikers FC (Q)	2	1	1	0	1	0	+1	4	Playoffs
3	Detroit City FC	1	1	0	0	2	0	+2	3	Playoffs
4	Stumptown Athletic	2	0	2	0	3	3	0	2	Playoffs
5	San Diego 1904 FC	2	0	2	0	2	2	0	2	
6	Chattanooga FC	1	0	1	0	1	1	0	1	
7	Los Angeles Force	2	0	1	1	1	3	−2	1	
8	Michigan Stars FC	2	0	0	2	1	3	−2	0	

Updated to match(es) played on March 8, 2020. Source: NISAofficial.com
(Q) Qualified for the phase indicated

==== Results summary ====
Overall								Home						Away					
Pld	W	D	L	GF	GA	GD	Pts	W	D	L	GF	GA	GD	W	D	L	GF	GA	GD
2	0	2	0	2	2	0	2	0	1	0	0	0	0	0	1	0	2	2	0

Last updated: 8 March 2020.
Source: Match reports

==== Matches ====
February 29, 2020 1	Stumptown Athletic	2–2	San Diego 1904 FC	Matthews, North Carolina
7:04 p.m.	Robertson 3'; Brown 42'; Odenbeck (yellow card) 57'	Report; MyCujoo Broadcast	Clarke (yellow card) 3'; Pérez 36'; Ramos 82'; Wright (yellow card) 86'	Stadium: CSA OrthoCarolina Sportsplex; Attendance: 963; Referee: Joshua Escobar

March 8, 2020 2	San Diego 1904 FC	0–0	California United Strikers FC	San Diego, California
3:00 p.m.	Ramos (yellow card) 26'; Garton (yellow card) 80'	Report; MyCujoo Broadcast	Capriotti (yellow card) 22'	Stadium: Lincoln High School; Attendance: 749; Referee: Samantha Martinez

March 14, 2020 3	California United Strikers FC	P–P	San Diego 1904 FC	Irvine, California
7:00 p.m				Stadium: Championship Soccer Stadium
Note: On March 12, NISA announced that it would be suspending its season 30 days due to the COVID-19 pandemic

March 21, 2020 4	San Diego 1904 FC	P–P	Stumptown Athletic	San Diego, California
7:04 p.m.				Stadium: Lincoln High School
Note: On March 12, NISA announced that it would be suspending its season 30 days due to the COVID-19 pandemic

March 28, 2020 5	San Diego 1904 FC	P–P	Oakland Roots SC	San Diego, California
7:04 p.m.				Stadium: Lincoln High School
Note: On March 12, NISA announced that it would be suspending its season 30 days due to the COVID-19 pandemic

April 10, 2020 6	Los Angeles Force	P–P	San Diego 1904 FC	Los Angeles, California
7:30 p.m				Stadium: Jesse Owens Stadium
Note: On March 30, NISA announced that it would be extending its suspension of play to May 10 in accordance with CDC guidelines for COVID-19

April 18, 2020 7	San Diego 1904 FC	P–P	Michigan Stars FC	San Diego, California
7:04 p.m.				Stadium: Lincoln High School
Note: On March 30, NISA announced that it would be extending its suspension of play to May 10 in accordance with CDC guidelines for COVID-19

April 25, 2020 8	Detroit City FC	P–P	San Diego 1904 FC	Hamtramck, Michigan
TBD				Stadium: Keyworth Stadium
Note: On March 30, NISA announced that it would be extending its suspension of play to May 10 in accordance with CDC guidelines for COVID-19

May 2, 2020 9	San Diego 1904 FC	P–P	Los Angeles Force	San Diego, California
7:04 p.m				Stadium: Lincoln High School
Note: On March 30, NISA announced that it would be extending its suspension of play to May 10 in accordance with CDC guidelines for COVID-19

May 9, 2020 10	San Diego 1904 FC	P–P	Detroit City FC	San Diego, California
7:04 p.m				Stadium: Lincoln High School
Note: On March 30, NISA announced that it would be extending its suspension of play to May 10 in accordance with CDC guidelines for COVID-19

May 17, 2020 11	Michigan Stars FC	P–P	San Diego 1904 FC	Pontiac, Michigan
7:00 p.m.				Stadium: Ultimate Soccer Arenas Outdoor Stadium
Note: On April 28, NISA announced the cancellation of the 2020 Spring season due to COVID-19

May 23, 2020 12	Chattanooga FC	P–P	San Diego 1904 FC	Chattanooga, Tennessee
7:30 p.m.				Stadium: Finley Stadium
Note: On April 28, NISA announced the cancellation of the 2020 Spring season due to COVID-19

May 30, 2020 13	Oakland Roots SC	P–P	San Diego 1904 FC	Oakland, California
5:10 p.m.				Stadium: Laney College
Note: On April 28, NISA announced the cancellation of the 2020 Spring season due to COVID-19

June 6, 2020 14	San Diego 1904 FC	P–P	Chattanooga FC	San Diego, California
7:04 p.m				Stadium: Lincoln High School
Note: On April 28, NISA announced the cancellation of the 2020 Spring season due to COVID-19

=== U.S. Open Cup ===
1904 FC will enter the 2020 U.S. Open Cup with the rest of the National Independent Soccer Association teams in the Second Round. It was announced on 29 January that their first opponent would be either National Premier Soccer League side ASC San Diego or local qualifier Chula Vista FC.

TBD Second Round	San Diego 1904 FC (NISA)	P–P	ASC San Diego (NPSL) or Chula Vista FC (LQ)	San Diego, California
				Stadium: Lincoln High School
Note: On March 13, U.S. Soccer’s Open Cup Committee announced the tournament would be temporarily suspended due to the COVID-19 pandemic

== Squad statistics ==
As of Match played 8 March 2020

=== Appearances and goals ===
No.	Pos	Nat	Player	Total		Fall Season		Spring Season		U.S. Open Cup	
No.	Pos	Nat	Player	Apps	Goals	Apps	Goals	Apps	Goals	Apps	Goals
Goalkeepers
21	GK	(Haiti) HAI	Jean Antoine	6	0	4	0	2	0	-	-
	GK	(Cameroon) CMR	Antony Siaha	0	0	0	0	0	0	-	-
Defenders
2	DF	(United States) USA	Alexis Velela	5	0	3	0	2	0	-	-
3	DF	(United States) USA	Mac Clarke	2	0	0	0	2	0	-	-
4	DF	(United States) USA	Ozzie Ramos	8	1	6	0	2	1	-	-
5	DF	(England) ENG	Josiah Benjamin	5	0	4	0	1	0	-	-
6	DF	(United States) USA	Dallin Cutler	8	0	6	0	2	0	-	-
13	DF	(France) FRA	Eder Arreola	8	0	6	0	2	0	-	-
29	DF	(United States) USA	Joseph Pérez	2	1	0	0	2	1	-	-
Midfielders
7	MF	(United States) USA	Felipe Liborio	7	0	6	0	1	0	-	-
8	MF	(United States) USA	Christian Enriquez	8	0	6	0	2	0	-	-
14	MF	(Mexico) MEX	Brandon Zambrano	5	1	5	1	0	0	-	-
19	MF	(England) ENG	Billy Garton	6	2	4	2	2	0	-	-
22	MF	(United States) USA	Jesse Vogel	0	0	0	0	0	0	-	-
98	MF	(England) ENG	Milo Barton	3	0	2	0	1	0	-	-
	MF	(United States) USA	Diego Esquivel	0	0	0	0	0	0	-	-
Forwards
9	FW	(United States) USA	Lorenzo Ramirez Jr.	8	3	6	3	2	0	-	-
10	FW	(United States) USA	Ernesto Espinoza	8	1	6	1	2	0	-	-
11	FW	(El Salvador) SLV	Nelson Blanco	6	1	6	1	0	0	-	-
16	FW	(United States) USA	Adonis Amaya	2	1	2	1	0	0	-	-
23	FW	(United States) USA	Hanif Wright	5	0	3	0	2	0	-	-
25	FW	(Benin) BEN	Don Tchilao	2	0	0	0	2	0	-	-
Left during season
1	GK	(United States) USA	Marcus Norris	4	0	4	0	-	-	-	-
3	DF	(France) FRA	Abdoulaye Cissoko	2	0	2	0	-	-	-	-
15	DF	(United States) USA	Jack Villatoro	3	0	3	0	-	-	-	-
17	FW	(United States) USA	Jorge Taylor	2	0	2	0	-	-	-	-
18	FW	(France) FRA	Élie Junior Akobeto	0	0	0	0	-	-	-	-
20	MF	(France) FRA	Nicolas Briere	1	0	1	0	-	-	-	-
36	FW	(Japan) JPN	Kazuma Suzuki	1	0	1	0	-	-	-	-
89	GK	(United States) USA	Brent Reis	0	0	0	0	-	-	-	-
99	MF	(France) FRA	Kentin Olive	1	0	1	0	-	-	-	-

=== Goal scorers ===
Place	Position	Nation	Number	Name	Fall Season	Spring Season	U.S. Open Cup	Total
1	FW	(United States)	9	Lorenzo Ramirez Jr.	3	0	-	3
2	MF	(England)	19	Billy Garton	2	0	-	2
3	DF	(United States)	4	Ozzie Ramos	0	1	-	1
3	FW	(United States)	10	Ernesto Espinoza	1	0	-	1
3	FW	(El Salvador)	11	Nelson Blanco	1	0	-	1
3	MF	(Mexico)	14	Brandon Zambrano	1	0	-	1
3	FW	(United States)	16	Adonis Amaya	1	0	-	1
3	DF	(United States)	29	Joseph Pérez	-	1	-	1

=== Disciplinary record ===
Number	Nation	Position	Name	Fall Season		Spring Season		U.S. Open Cup		Total	
Number	Nation	Position	Name	Booked	Sent off (straight red)	Booked	Sent off (straight red)	Booked	Sent off (straight red)	Booked	Sent off (straight red)
2	(United States)	DF	Alexis Velela	2	0	0	0	-	-	2	0
3	(United States)	DF	Abdoulaye Cissoko	1	0	-	-	-	-	1	0
3	(United States)	DF	Mac Clarke	-	-	1	0	-	-	1	0
4	(United States)	DF	Ozzie Ramos	1	0	1	0	-	-	2	0
9	(United States)	FW	Lorenzo Ramirez Jr.	1	0	0	0	-	-	1	0
13	(France)	DF	Eder Arreola	1	0	0	0	-	-	1	0
14	(Mexico)	MF	Brandon Zambrano	2	0	0	0	-	-	2	0
17	(United States)	FW	Jorge Taylor	1	0	-	-	-	-	1	0
19	(England)	MF	Billy Garton	2	0	1	0	-	-	3	0
21	(Haiti)	GK	Jean Antoine	0	1	0	0	-	-	0	1
23	(United States)	FW	Hanif Wright	1	0	1	0	-	-	2	0
98	(England)	MF	Milo Barton	1	0	0	0	-	-	1	0
