= 2022 Maryland Bobcats FC season =

Maryland Bobcats
2022 season
- President: Jay Saba
- Head coach: Sylvain Rastello
- Stadium: Maryland SoccerPlex
- NISA: Conference: 1st Overall: 1st
- U.S. Open Cup: Second round
- Legends Cup: To be determined
- Independent Cup: Mid-Atlantic Champions
- Top goalscorer: League: Canas-Jarquin (1); All: Fernandes (2)
- Biggest win: 1–0 (vs. WMP (A), April 6, USOC)
- Biggest defeat: 1–6 (vs. MBFC (A), April 2, NISA)
Home colors	Away colors	Third colors

The 2022 Maryland Bobcats FC season was the club's seventh season of existence, and their third in the National Independent Soccer Association (NISA), the third tier of American soccer. The Bobcats' season began on March 26, 2022, and will conclude on October 10, 2022.

== Competitions ==
=== NISA ===
==== Standings ====
Pos	Team	Pld	W	D	L	GF	GA	GD	Pts	PPG	Qualification
1	California United Strikers FC	21	14	4	3	35	12	+23	46	2.19	Qualification for the semi-finals
2	Chattanooga FC	24	14	7	3	44	21	+23	49	2.04	Qualification for the semi-finals
3	Michigan Stars FC	23	10	8	5	27	15	+12	38	1.65	Qualification for the play-offs
4	Albion San Diego	20	9	5	6	28	23	+5	32	1.60	Qualification for the play-offs
5	Maryland Bobcats FC	23	8	6	9	32	28	+4	30	1.30	Qualification for the play-offs
6	Syracuse Pulse	22	7	4	11	26	32	−6	25	1.14	Qualification for the play-offs
7	Los Angeles Force	20	2	8	10	14	31	−17	14	0.70	
8	Flower City Union	23	2	3	18	13	57	−44	9	0.39	

Source: nisasoccer.com
Rules for classification: 1) points; 2) goal differential; 3) goals scored; 4) head-to-head

==== Results summary ====
Overall								Home						Away					
Pld	W	D	L	GF	GA	GD	Pts	W	D	L	GF	GA	GD	W	D	L	GF	GA	GD
5	3	2	0	12	4	+8	11	2	1	0	10	3	+7	1	1	0	2	1	+1

Last updated: May 6, 2022.
Source: Maryland Bobcats

==== Match results ====
March 26 1	Chattanooga FC	1–1	Maryland Bobcats	Chattanooga, TN
TBD EDT	Gray (yellow card) 6'; Jones (yellow card) 35'; Cerro 48'; Dixon (yellow card) 71'	Report	Possian (yellow card) 18'; Espinal 82'	Stadium: Finley Stadium; Attendance: 2,315

April 2 2	Maryland Bobcats	6–1	Flower City Union	Boyds, MD
TBD EDT	Amo 13'; Espinal 29'; Solomon 56', 63'; Amo 72'; Brickman 90' (o.g.)	Report	Veerakone (yellow card) 17'; Canas-Jarquin 58'	Stadium: Maryland SoccerPlex

April 9 3	Maryland Bobcats	3–1	Syracuse Pulse	Boyds, MD
TBD EDT	Espinal 19'; Amo 62'; Akinkoye 64'	Report	Moyers (yellow card) 69' (yellow-red card) 84'; Kafari (yellow card) 72'; Satrustegui 81'	Stadium: Maryland SoccerPlex

April 23 4	Flower City Union	0–1	Maryland Bobcats	Rochester, NY
TBD EDT	Williamson (yellow card) 14'; Kranick (yellow card) 57'; Demydiv (yellow card) 78'	Report	Mason (yellow card) 9'; Majano (yellow card) 19'; Clegg 22'; Espinal (yellow card) 29'; Alvarado (yellow card) 73'; González (yellow card) 90'	Stadium: Marina Auto Stadium

April 30 5	Maryland Bobcats	1–1	Michigan Stars	Boyds, MD
TBD EDT	Fane (yellow card) 27'; Maric 45'; Bowie (yellow card) 89'	Report	Solomon 38'; Alvarado (yellow card) 90'	Stadium: Maryland SoccerPlex; Attendance: 657

May 7 6	Maryland Bobcats	1–2	Chattanooga FC	Boyds, MD
7:00 p.m. EDT	Caulker (yellow card) 45'; Wright (yellow card) 45'; Clegg 72'	Report	Naglestad 38'; McGrath (yellow card) 51'; Green (yellow card) 80'	Stadium: Maryland SoccerPlex

May 14 7	Flower City Union	2–1	Maryland Bobcats	Rochester, NY
3:00 p.m. EDT				Stadium: Marina Auto Stadium

May 21 8	Maryland Bobcats	1-4	Bay Cities FC	Boyds, MD
7:00 p.m. EDT	Majano 33'		Jimenez 6', Cardona 35', Romero 44', Cardona 63'	Stadium: Maryland SoccerPlex

June 4 9	Syracuse Pulse	0-0	Maryland Bobcats	Syracuse, NY
7:00 p.m. EDT				Stadium: Lazer Stadium

June 18 10	Michigan Stars	0-1	Maryland Bobcats	Romeo, MI
7:00 p.m. EDT			Amo 60'	Stadium: Barnabo Field

July 9 11	Maryland Bobcats	1-2	Michigan Stars	Boyds, MD
7:00 p.m. EDT	Espinal 38' (pen.)		Zhongo 21', Nelson 89'	Stadium: Maryland SoccerPlex

August 3 12	Maryland Bobcats	1–0	California United Strikers	Boyds, MD
7:00 p.m. EDT				Stadium: Maryland SoccerPlex

August 6 13	Chattanooga FC	3–0	Maryland Bobcats	Chattanooga, TN
7:30 p.m. EDT				Stadium: Finley Stadium

August 13 14	Maryland Bobcats	5–0	Flower City Union	Boyds, MD
7:00 p.m. EDT	Wivell 7'; Espinal 54', 77'; Boone 57', 58'	Report		Stadium: Maryland SoccerPlex

August 17 15	Albion San Diego	2-1	Maryland Bobcats	San Diego, CA
9:00 p.m. EDT	Diakhate 45+1', 68'		Mason 27'	Stadium: Canyon Crest Stadium

August 20 16	Bay Cities FC	v	Maryland Bobcats	Redwood City, CA
10:00 p.m. EDT				Stadium: Terremere Field

August 24 17	Maryland Bobcats	v	Valley United	Boyds, MD
7:00 p.m. EDT				Stadium: Maryland SoccerPlex

August 27 18	Maryland Bobcats	1-1	Chattanooga FC	Boyds, MD
7:00 p.m. EDT	Clegg 49'		Rodriguez 30'	Stadium: Maryland SoccerPlex

September 11 19	Syracuse Pulse	2-1	Maryland Bobcats	Syracuse, NY
7:00 p.m. EDT	Louis 24' Kwak 88'		Balogun 43'	Stadium: Lazer Stadium

September 14 20	Maryland Bobcats	3-0	Los Angeles Force	Boyds, MD
7:00 p.m. EDT	Wivell 4', Espinal 77', 87'			Stadium: Maryland SoccerPlex

September 25 21	Michigan Stars	2-0	Maryland Bobcats	Boyds, MD
7:00 p.m. EDT	Zhongo 2', 45'			Stadium: Maryland SoccerPlex

October 1 22	Maryland Bobcats	1-0	Albion San Diego	Boyds, MD
7:00 p.m. EDT				Stadium: Maryland SoccerPlex

October 5 23	California United Strikers	2-0	Maryland Bobcats	Irvine, CA
10:00 p.m. EDT				Stadium: Championship Soccer Stadium

October 8 24	Los Angeles Force	1-1	Maryland Bobcats	Los Angeles, CA
10:00 p.m. EDT				Stadium: Jesse Owens Stadium

October 12 25	Valley United	v	Maryland Bobcats	Mesa, AZ
10:00 p.m. EDT				Stadium: Bell Bank Park

October 15 26	Maryland Bobcats	1-1	Syracuse Pulse	Boyds, MD
7:00 p.m. EDT				Stadium: Maryland SoccerPlex

=== U.S. Open Cup ===
April 5	Pittsburgh Riverhounds (USLC) (Pennsylvania)	2–0	Maryland Bobcats FC (NISA)	Pittsburgh, PA
7:00 pm EDT	Sims 37', 55'	Report		Stadium: Highmark Stadium; Referee: Samuel Reynolds

=== NISA Independent Cup ===
July 30 Mid-Atlantic final	Maryland Bobcats (NISA)	5–2	Northern Virginia FC (EPSL)	Boyds, MD
7:00 pm EDT	Balogun 26', 90'; Espinal 31'; Fane 77'; Wangu 80'	Report	Sheta 49'; Vagner 59'	Stadium: Maryland SoccerPlex
