= 2022 National Independent Soccer Association season =

National Independent Soccer Association
- Season: 2022
- Dates: Mar. 26 – Oct. 15 (regular season); Oct. 21 – Nov. 6 (playoffs)
- Champions: Michigan Stars FC
- Regular season title: California United Strikers FC
- Matches: 94
- Goals: 239 (2.54 per match)
- Top goalscorer: (Norway) Markus Naglestad (19)
- Biggest home win: MAR 6–1 FCU (April 2); CAL 5–0 LAF (Jun 26)
- Biggest away win: FCU 0–5 CHA (Jul 16)
- Highest scoring: CAL 4–3 BCFC (April 23)
- Longest winning run: 9 games CAL
- Longest unbeaten run: 10 games CAL
- Longest winless run: 9 games FCU
- Longest losing run: 5 games FCU
- All statistics correct as of October 15, 2022.

The 2022 NISA season is the fourth season of the National Independent Soccer Association's third-division soccer competition. After three years of split seasons, NISA switched to a full season format, with a single table and a playoff competition to determine the 2022 champion.

== Teams ==
Six of the teams that participated in the 2021 Fall season returned, and were joined by four expansion clubs: Bay Cities FC, Flower City Union, Syracuse Pulse, and Valley United FC. From the existing 2021 teams, San Diego 1904 FC were rebranded to Albion San Diego, after merging with the youth club with the same name, while Chicago House AC, New Amsterdam FC and Stumptown AC will be on hiatus for 2022, and current title holders Detroit City FC moved to USL Championship.

=== Stadiums and locations ===
Locations of announced clubs
- Participating club

Team	Location	Stadium	Capacity
Albion San Diego	San Diego, California	Canyon Crest Academy Stadium (Note: Albion played its home match vs Maryland on August 17 at California State University San Marcos)	5,000
Bay Cities FC	Redwood City, California	Terremere Field (Note: Bay Cities played its home match vs Flower City on June 1 at Cañada College)	3,500
California United Strikers FC	Irvine, California	Championship Soccer Stadium	5,000
Chattanooga FC	Chattanooga, Tennessee	Finley Stadium	20,668
Flower City Union	Rochester, New York	Marina Auto Stadium (Note: Flower City Union played its home matches of May 4 vs California United Strikers and June 15 vs Los Angeles Force at Vandetta Stadium in Batavia, New York due to date conflicts.)	13,768
Los Angeles Force	Whittier, California	Various (Note: LA Force played their first home matches at Garey Stadium, second home at Orange County Great Park Turf 10, third hone at Ayala Park Stadium at Chino, fourth home at Championship Soccer Stadium and now fifth, and sixth home at Covina District Field at Covina. The seventh match, also meant for Covina, was postponed and is listed as of August 22, 2022 as to be decided. The final four matches, excluding the postponed match, are to be held at Los Angeles Harbor College.)	
Maryland Bobcats FC	Boyds, Maryland	Maryland SoccerPlex	4,000
Michigan Stars FC	Washington, Michigan	Romeo High School	4,000
Syracuse Pulse	Syracuse, New York	Lazer Stadium	2,000
Valley United FC	Mesa, Arizona	Bell Bank Park	5,000

=== Personnel and sponsorship ===
Note: The league has signed a deal with Hummel to be the official kit manufacturer, but it still allows clubs to find their own provider.

Team	Head coach	Captain(s)	Kit manufacturer	Shirt sponsor
Albion San Diego	(United States) Jeff Korytoski	(United States) Ozzie Ramos	(United States) Capelli	Nova Easy Kombucha
Bay Cities FC	(United States) Anders Perez		(Denmark) Hummel	Premia
California United Strikers FC	(United States) Don Ebert	(United States) Xavier Fuerte	(United States) Nike	Taco Bell
Chattanooga FC	(United States) Rod Underwood	(Spain) Juan Hernandez	(Denmark) Hummel	Louisiana Hot Sauce, VfL Wolfsburg
Flower City Union	(United States) Colton Bly (interim)		(Denmark) Hummel	
Los Angeles Force	(Brazil) Thales Peterson	(United States) Joshua Culwell	(United States) Xara	—
Maryland Bobcats FC	(Canada) Sylvain Rastello	(United States) Kay Banjo	(Denmark) Hummel	Jimmy's Famous Seafood
Michigan Stars FC	(United States) Trevor Banks		(Denmark) Hummel	HTC
Syracuse Pulse	(United States) Peter Fuller	(United States) Shaun Russell	(Italy) Givova	Montreal Construction, SOS
Valley United FC		(United States) Nico Gaitan	(United States) Capelli	

=== Coaching changes ===
Team	Outgoing coach	Manner of departure	Date of vacancy	Position in table	Incoming coach	Date of appointment
Flower City Union	(United States) Zach Agliata	Resigned	May 3, 2022	4th in East	(United States) Colton Bly (interim)	May 3, 2022
Valley United	(United States) Adrian Gaitan	Resigned	May 19, 2022	2nd in East	TBD	

== Regular season ==
The season started on March 26, and will see each team play 26 games over 30 weeks: four times against each opponent in the same division and two times against each opponent in the opposite division.

=== Standings (March 26–August 27) ===
==== East Division ====
Pos	Team	Pld	W	D	L	GF	GA	GD	Pts	Qualification
1	Chattanooga FC	16	9	4	3	30	12	+18	31	Qualification for the semi-finals
2	Michigan Stars FC	15	6	6	3	18	9	+9	24	Qualification for the play-offs
3	Maryland Bobcats FC	15	6	3	6	24	19	+5	21	Qualification for the play-offs
4	Syracuse Pulse	16	5	2	9	18	23	−5	17	
5	Flower City Union	19	2	2	15	10	50	−40	8	

Updated to match(es) played on August 20, 2022. Source: nisasoccer.com
Rules for classification: 1) points; 2) goal differential; 3) goals scored; 4) head-to-head

==== West Division ====
Pos	Team	Pld	W	D	L	GF	GA	GD	Pts	Qualification
1	California United Strikers FC	14	11	2	1	24	6	+18	35	Qualification for the semi-finals
2	Albion San Diego	10	4	4	2	14	12	+2	16	Qualification for the play-offs
3	Bay Cities FC	12	4	3	5	18	18	0	15	Qualification for the play-offs
4	Los Angeles Force	11	2	4	5	7	14	−7	10	
5	Valley United FC (Note: Valley United FC withdrew from the league and their playing record of P9 W1 D1 L7 GF4 GA21 was expunged.)	0	0	0	0	0	0	0	0	Withdrew from the league

Updated to match(es) played on August 20, 2022. Source: nisasoccer.com
Rules for classification: 1) points; 2) goal differential; 3) goals scored; 4) head-to-head

=== Standings (August 27–October 15) ===
Due to Bay Cities FC's withdrawal from this season, NISA has revised the 2022 schedule and table with the eight remaining clubs. As a result, this standings had been condensed into a single table format and used an average-points per game total (points earned divided by matches played).

Pos	Team	Pld	W	D	L	GF	GA	GD	Pts	PPG	Qualification
1	California United Strikers FC	21	14	4	3	35	12	+23	46	2.19	Qualification for the semi-finals
2	Chattanooga FC	24	14	7	3	44	21	+23	49	2.04	Qualification for the semi-finals
3	Michigan Stars FC	23	10	8	5	27	15	+12	38	1.65	Qualification for the play-offs
4	Albion San Diego	20	9	5	6	28	23	+5	32	1.60	Qualification for the play-offs
5	Maryland Bobcats FC	23	8	6	9	32	28	+4	30	1.30	Qualification for the play-offs
6	Syracuse Pulse	22	7	4	11	26	32	−6	25	1.14	Qualification for the play-offs
7	Los Angeles Force	20	2	8	10	14	31	−17	14	0.70	
8	Flower City Union	23	2	3	18	13	57	−44	9	0.39	

Source: nisasoccer.com
Rules for classification: 1) points; 2) goal differential; 3) goals scored; 4) head-to-head

=== Results ===
Home \ Away	CHA	FLO	MAR	MIC	SYR	ALB	BAY	CAL	LAF	~~VAL~~ (Note: Valley United withdrew from 2022 season after roster controversy around a club. As a result, a team who against Valley United in previous matches will not take a result and points for standings.)	CHA	FLO	MAR	MIC	SYR	ALB	BAY	CAL	LAF	~~VAL~~
Chattanooga FC	—	0–1	1–1	0–0	3–0	2–1	4–2	0–1	3–2	With.	—	1–0	3–0	0–0	2–1					
Flower City Union	1–5	—	0–1	0–3	0–1	2–2	With.	1–2	0–3	~~2-1~~	0–5	—	2–1	0–2	0–2					
Maryland Bobcats FC	1–2	6–1	—	1–1	3–1	1–0	1–4	1–0	3–0	With.	1–1	5–0	—	1–2	1–1					
Michigan Stars FC	0–0	3–0	0–1	—	3–0 (Note: Forfeited by Syracuse due to financial issues)	2–0	2–1	0–1	1–0	With.	2–3	0–0	2–0	—	2–2					
Syracuse Pulse	0–1	4–0	0–0	0–2	—	0–3	With.	0–1	1–2	~~0-2~~	3–0	3–1	2–1	0–0	—					
Albion San Diego	1–2	2–1	2–1	3–0	3–1	—	1–1	0–3	3–1	~~3-0~~ (Note: Forfeited by Valley United due to roster violations)						—	With.	1–0	1–0	With.
Bay Cities FC	0–3	3–1	With.	With.	With.	3–1	—	0–1	With.	~~3-0~~						With.	—	With.	With.	With.
California United Strikers FC	2–2	1–0	2–0	2–0	3–1	1–1	0–0	—	5–0	~~3-0~~						1–2	4–3	—	3–0	With.
Los Angeles Force	1–1	2–2	1–1	0–0	1–3	0–0	0–0	0–2	—	With.						1–1	0–1	0–0	—	With.
~~Valley United FC~~	~~0-3~~	With.	With.	With.	With.	~~0-3~~	With.	With.	~~0-3~~	—						~~1-1~~	With.	With.	With.	—

Source: nisasoccer.com
Legend: Blue = home team win; Yellow = draw; Red = away team win.

== Playoffs ==
The playoffs began on October 21, and featured the top six teams from the regular season. The top two teams from the regular season table received a bye into the league semifinals. Teams finishing third through sixth played in the quarterfinals, with the winners being re-seeded before playing in the next round. The 2022 Final took place on November 6. All postseason games were broadcast online on Eleven Sports.

Originally, the East and West division winners would have been assigned the top two seeds and received byes to the semifinals. The second place teams in each division were to be seeded 3 and 4, while the third place finishers would be seeded 5 and 6. Following the restructuring of the table on August 27, the division aspect was dropped.

Quarterfinal; October 21 (Eleven Sports)
3	Michigan Stars FC	2
6	Syracuse Pulse	0

Quarterfinal; October 21 (Eleven Sports)
4	Albion San Diego	2
5	Maryland Bobcats FC	0

Semifinals; October 29/30 (Eleven Sports)
1	California United Strikers FC	2
4	Albion San Diego	4
2	Chattanooga FC	0
3	Michigan Stars FC	1

NISA Championship Final; November 5 (Eleven Sports)
4	Albion San Diego	0
3	Michigan Stars FC	1

=== Schedule ===
==== Quarterfinals ====
October 21, 2022	Michigan Stars FC	2–0	Syracuse Pulse	Washington, Michigan
7:00 p.m. EDT	Iakov Shmelev 44'; Anthony Bowie 76'	Report; Broadcast		Stadium: Romeo Stadium; Referee: Kevin Fikar

October 21, 2022	Albion San Diego	2–0	Maryland Bobcats FC	Pacific Highlands Ranch, San Diego
6:00 p.m. PDT	Daniel Vicente 47' (pen.); Mayele Malango 67'	Report; Broadcast		Stadium: Canyon Crest Stadium

==== Semifinals ====
October 29, 2022	California United Strikers FC	2–4	Albion San Diego	Irvine, California
7:00 p.m. PDT	Omar Nuño 39' (pen.); Shinya Kadono 51'	Report; Broadcast	Lennyn Carreon 17'; Mayele Malango 38'; Jonathan Bazaes 74'; Alioune Diakhate 83'	Stadium: Championship Soccer Stadium

October 30, 2022	Chattanooga FC	0–1	Michigan Stars FC	Chattanooga, Tennessee
5:00 p.m. EDT		Report; Broadcast	Leon Maric 56'	Stadium: Finley Stadium

==== NISA Championship Final ====
November 6, 2022	Michigan Stars FC	1–0	Albion San Diego	Washington, Michigan
4:00 p.m. EDT	Anthony Bowie 31'	Report; Broadcast		Stadium: Romeo Stadium; Attendance: 1,178; Referee: Alex Beehler

== Player statistics ==
As of October 15, 2022

=== Top goalscorers ===
Rank	Player	Club	Goals
1	(Norway) Markus Naglestad	Chattanooga FC	19
2	(Senegal) Alioune Diakhate	Albion San Diego	12
3	(Honduras) Darwin Espinal	Maryland Bobcats	10
4	(Mexico) Omar Nuño	California United Strikers	9
5	(United States) Kaleb Jackson	Syracuse Pulse	8
6	(United States) Tony Lopez	California United Strikers	7
7	(United States) Taylor Gray	Chattanooga FC	6
7	(Haiti) Juan Louis	Syracuse Pulse	6
9	(United States) Elijah Amo	Maryland Bobcats	5
9	(England) Alex McGrath	Chattanooga FC	5
9	(United States) Edwin Rivas	Los Angeles Force	5
9	(Greece) Vasilios Zogos	Michigan Stars	5

=== Top assists ===
Rank	Player	Club	Assists
1	(United States) Éder Guerrero	Los Angeles Force	5
1	(United States) Steven Juncaj	Michigan Stars	5
1	(United States) David Mason	Maryland Bobcats	5
1	(Norway) Markus Naglestad	Chattanooga FC	5
5	(United States) Elijah Amo	Maryland Bobcats	4
5	(Senegal) Alioune Diakhate	Albion San Diego	4
5	(Honduras) Darwin Espinal	Maryland Bobcats	4
5	(Cape Verde) Walter Varela	Albion San Diego	4
5	(United States) Gustavo Villalobos	California United Strikers	4
10	7 players tied		3

=== Clean sheets ===
Rank	Player	Club	Clean sheets
1	(Haiti) Jean Antoine	California United Strikers	11
1	(Zimbabwe) Tatenda Mkuruva	Michigan Stars	11
3	(Ghana) Felix Annan	Maryland Bobcats	6
3	(United States) Kevin Gonzalez	Chattanooga FC	6
5	(United States) Brandon Gomez	Los Angeles Force	5
6	(United States) Benjamin Roach	Albion San Diego	4
7	(United States) Daniel Gagliardi	Syracuse Pulse	3
7	(United States) Alec Redington	Chattanooga FC	3
7	(United States) Macklin Robinson	Syracuse Pulse	3
10	5 players tied		2

== Awards ==
=== Individual awards ===
Award	Winner	Team	Reason	Ref.
Golden Boot	(Norway) Markus Naglestad	Chattanooga FC	19 goals in 23 games	
Golden Glove	(Haiti) Jean Antoine	California United Strikers FC	12 shutouts in 16 matches; 5 goals against	
Coach of the Year	(United States) Rod Underwood	Chattanooga FC	14-7-3 record	
Golden Ball (Most Valuable Player)	(Norway) Markus Naglestad	Chattanooga FC	19 goals, 5 assists	

=== NISA Best XI ===
First team
Goalkeeper	Defenders	Midfielders	Forwards
(Haiti) Jean Antoine (CUS)	(Canada) Matt Constant (MIC) (United States) Garrett Hogbin (CUS) (Greece) Vasilios Zogos (MIC)	(South Korea) Minjae Kwak (SYR) (England) Alex McGrath (CHA)	(Senegal) Alioune Diakhate (ASD) (Honduras) Darwin Espinal (MAR) (United States) Taylor Gray (CHA) (Norway) Markus Naglestad (CHA) (Mexico) Omar Nuño (CUS)

Second team
Goalkeeper	Defenders	Midfielders	Forwards
(Zimbabwe) Tatenda Mkuruva (MIC)	(Portugal) Jonathan Firmino (MIC) (United States) Franky Martinez (CHA) (United States) Edwin Rivas (LAF)	(United States) Ian Cerro (CHA) (Jamaica) Richard Dixon (CHA) (Colombia) Manuel Gonzalez (MAR) (United States) Steven Juncaj (MIC) (United States) Tony Lopez (CUS) (Cape Verde) Walter Varela (ASD)	(United States) Kaleb Jackson (SYR)

== NISA Independent Cup ==
The NISA Independent Cup will start on June 25. It features nine of the ten NISA clubs, with California United Strikers FC opting not to participate the tournament. They will be joined by 27 invited amateur teams and divided geographically into nine regions of four clubs each. Each region will play a single round robin tournament between three amateur teams using a 10-point system. The winner of that round-robin will play against the NISA teams for the regional championship. Like last year, there will be no interregional play or national champion.

=== Participating Clubs ===
Nine NISA teams play in nine regions respectively, as California United Strikers FC did not participate. Midwest, New England and South Central region replaced with Empire, Northeast and SoCal region due to lack of NISA teams (despite Michigan Stars based from Midwest but plays in Great Lakes as NISA's 2022 season did not have Midwest based clubs other than Michigan Stars).

Empire
St	Team	League
(Pennsylvania)	Allentown United FC	NISA Nation
(New York (state))	Lansdowne Yonkers FC	EPSL
(New York (state))	NY Braveheart SC	NISA Nation
(New York (state))	Syracuse Pulse	NISA

Great Lakes
St	Team	League
(Wisconsin)	FC Milwaukee Torrent	NPSL
(Michigan)	Lansing Common FC	MWPL
(Kentucky)	Metro Louisville FC	UPSL
(Michigan)	Michigan Stars FC	NISA

Mid-Atlantic
St	Team	League
(Maryland)	Maryland Bobcats FC	NISA
(Virginia)	Northern Virginia FC	EPSL
(Maryland)	Rockville SC	UPSL
(South Carolina)	Soda City FC	UPSL

Northeast
St	Team	League
(New York (state))	Flower City Union	NISA
(New Jersey)	New Jersey Alliance FC	NISA Nation
(New York (state))	NY Contour United	UPSL
(Maryland)	Steel Pulse FC	Maryland Super Soccer League

Pacific
St	Team	League
(Nevada)	Battle Born FC	NISA Nation
(California)	Bay Cities FC	NISA
(California)	Modesto City FC	SWPL
(Washington (state))	Wenatchee All-Stars FC	CasPL

SoCal
St	Team	League
(California)	AFC South Bay	NISA Nation
(California)	Albion San Diego	NISA
(California)	Capo FC	NISA Nation
(California)	Soul 2 Sole	SWPL

Southeast
St	Team	League
(Florida)	Brevard Fire SC	NSL Florida
(Tennessee)	Chattanooga FC	NISA
(Florida)	Club de Lyon FC	NISA Nation
(Florida)	Miami Beach CF	NPSL

Southwest
St	Team	League
(Arizona)	East Valley United	SWPL
(Arizona)	SC Saguaros	SWPL
(Arizona)	Valley FC Raiders	NISA Nation
(Arizona)	Valley United FC	NISA

West Coast
St	Team	League
(California)	Inland Empire Republic FC	SWPL
(California)	Los Angeles Force	NISA
(California)	Olympiacos CA	SWPL
(Colorado)	Peak XI FC	MPL

=== Empire Region ===
==== Group stage ====
Pos	Team	Pld	W	D	L	GF	GA	GD	Pts	Qualification
1	NY Braveheart SC (Q)	2	2	0	0	7	1	+6	19	Qualification for the regional final
2	Lansdowne Yonkers FC	2	1	0	1	6	5	+1	10	
3	Allentown United FC	2	0	0	2	1	8	−7	1	

Source: nisaofficial.com
(Q) Qualified for the phase indicated

==== Regional final ====
July 30, 2022	Syracuse Pulse	6–2	NY Braveheart SC	Utica, New York
4:00 PM EDT	Russell 18', (yellow card) 66'; McKinley 45+1'; Jackson 55', 74'; Rendon (yellow card) 68'; Campos 80' (o.g.); MacDonald 82'	Report	Rodriguez 37', (yellow card) 74'; Najera (yellow card) 61'; Lenis 64'	Stadium: Charles A. Gaetano Stadium

=== Great Lakes Region ===
==== Group stage ====
Pos	Team	Pld	W	D	L	GF	GA	GD	Pts	Qualification
1	Metro Louisville FC (Q)	2	2	0	0	3	1	+2	16	Qualification for the regional final
2	FC Milwaukee Torrent	2	1	0	1	5	2	+3	11	
3	Lansing Common FC	2	0	0	2	0	5	−5	0	

Source: nisaofficial.com
(Q) Qualified for the phase indicated

==== Regional final ====
July 29, 2022	Michigan Stars FC	2–1 (a.e.t.)	Metro Louisville FC	Washington, Michigan
6:30 PM EDT	S. Juncaj (yellow card) 26'; Maric 70'; Zhongo 97'; McCloud (yellow card) 116'	Report	Ibrahimkadic (yellow card) 45+1'; Harmon 46'; Trejo (yellow card) 84'	Stadium: Michigan Stars Sports Center; Referee: Nicole Green

=== Mid-Atlantic Region ===
==== Group stage ====
Pos	Team	Pld	W	D	L	GF	GA	GD	Pts	Qualification
1	Northern Virginia FC (Q)	2	2	0	0	9	2	+7	19	Qualification for the regional final
2	Soda City FC	2	1	0	1	3	3	0	10	
3	Rockville SC	2	0	0	2	2	9	−7	2	

Source: nisaofficial.com
(Q) Qualified for the phase indicated

==== Regional final ====
July 30, 2022	Maryland Bobcats FC	5–2	Northern Virginia FC	Boyds, Maryland
7:00 PM EDT		Report		Stadium: Maryland SoccerPlex

=== Northeast Region ===
==== Group stage ====
Pos	Team	Pld	W	D	L	GF	GA	GD	Pts	Qualification
1	New Jersey Alliance FC (Q)	2	1	1	0	1	0	+1	13	Qualification for the regional final
2	Steel Pulse FC	2	1	0	1	10	1	+9	10	
3	NY Contour United	2	0	1	1	0	10	−10	5	

Source: nisaofficial.com
(Q) Qualified for the phase indicated

==== Regional final ====
July 24, 2022	Flower City Union	2–0	New Jersey Alliance FC	Rochester, New York
5:00 PM EDT		Report		Stadium: Rochester Community Sports Complex Stadium

=== Pacific Region ===
==== Group stage ====
Pos	Team	Pld	W	D	L	GF	GA	GD	Pts	Qualification
1	Wenatchee All-Stars FC (Q)	2	2	0	0	4	1	+3	17	Qualification for the regional final
2	Battleborn FC	2	1	0	1	7	3	+4	11	
3	Modesto City FC	2	0	0	2	0	7	−7	0	

Source: nisaofficial.com
(Q) Qualified for the phase indicated

==== Regional final ====
July 23, 2022	Bay Cities FC	0–1	Wenatchee All-Stars FC	Redwood City, California
6:00 PM PDT		Report		Stadium: Sequoia Stadium

=== SoCal Region ===
==== Group stage ====
Pos	Team	Pld	W	D	L	GF	GA	GD	Pts	Qualification
1	Capo FC (Q)	2	2	0	0	6	1	+5	17	Qualification for the regional final
2	AFC South Bay	2	1	0	1	4	4	0	9	
3	Soul 2 Sole	2	0	0	2	4	9	−5	4	

Source: nisaofficial.com
(Q) Qualified for the phase indicated

==== Regional final ====
July 24, 2022	Capo FC	1–3	Albion San Diego	San Juan Capistrano, California
7:00 PM PDT		Report		Stadium: Jserra Stadium

=== Southeast Region ===
==== Group stage ====
Pos	Team	Pld	W	D	L	GF	GA	GD	Pts	Qualification
1	Club de Lyon FC (Q)	2	2	0	0	5	1	+4	18	Qualification for the regional final
2	Miami Beach CF	2	1	0	1	5	3	+2	10	
3	Brevard Fire SC	2	0	0	2	1	7	−6	1	

Source: nisaofficial.com
(Q) Qualified for the phase indicated

==== Regional final ====
July 23, 2022	Chattanooga FC	3–2	Club de Lyon FC	Chattanooga, Tennessee
7:30 PM EDT		Report		Stadium: Finley Stadium

=== Southwest Region ===
==== Group stage ====
Pos	Team	Pld	W	D	L	GF	GA	GD	Pts	Qualification
1	Valley FC Raiders (Q)	2	1	1	0	6	1	+5	15	Qualification for the regional final
2	East Valley United	2	1	1	0	5	2	+3	14	
3	SC Saguaros	2	0	0	2	1	9	−8	1	

Source: nisaofficial.com
(Q) Qualified for the phase indicated

==== Regional final ====
August 6, 2022	Valley United FC	Cancelled	Valley FC Raiders	Mesa, Arizona
TBD MST				Stadium: Bell Bank Park
Note: Due to Valley United FC suspended all operations for the balance of the 2022 season including southwest regional final between Valley United FC and Valley FC Raiders, Valley FC Raiders was awarded the southwest regional title as a group stage winner.

=== West Coast Region ===
==== Group stage ====
Pos	Team	Pld	W	D	L	GF	GA	GD	Pts	Qualification
1	Inland Empire Republic FC (Q)	2	2	0	0	4	1	+3	17	Qualification for the regional final
2	Peak XI FC	2	1	0	1	3	2	+1	10	
3	Olympiacos CA	2	0	0	2	0	4	−4	0	

Source: nisaofficial.com
(Q) Qualified for the phase indicated

==== Regional final ====
July 24, 2022	Los Angeles Force	2–0	Inland Empire Republic FC	Covina, California
6:00 PM PDT		Report		Stadium: Covina District Field

== See also ==
- National Independent Soccer Association
