= 2023 National Independent Soccer Association season =

National Independent Soccer Association
- Season: 2023
- Dates: Mar. 31 – Oct. 25 (regular season); Oct. 28 – Nov. 11 (playoffs)
- Champions: City Union
- Regular season title: Chattanooga FC
- Matches: 108
- Goals: 268 (2.48 per match)
- Top goalscorer: (Norway) Markus Naglestad (15)
- All statistics correct as of November 11, 2023.

The 2023 NISA season is the fifth season of the National Independent Soccer Association's third-division soccer competition. Michigan Stars are the defending champions, after winning the 2022 season.

== Teams ==
Of the eight teams that finished the 2022 season, five return for 2023, two (Flower City Union and Syracuse Pulse) merge to form a new team branded City Union, and one, California United Strikers, is on hiatus, with the aim to return in 2024.

The six teams are joined by three expansion clubs: Club de Lyon, Gold Star FC and Savannah Clovers FC.

=== Stadiums and locations ===
Locations of announced clubs
- Participating club

Team	Location	Stadium	Capacity
Albion San Diego	San Diego, CA	Canyon Crest Academy Stadium	5,000
Chattanooga FC	Chattanooga, TN	Finley Stadium	20,668
City Union	Rochester, NY; Auburn, NY	Marina Auto Stadium; Falcon Park	13,768; 2,800
Club de Lyon	Daytona Beach, FL	Daytona Stadium	9,601
Gold Star FC	Livonia, MI	Gold Star Stadium	5,000
Los Angeles Force	Irvine, CA	Championship Stadium	5,000
Maryland Bobcats	Boyds, MD	Maryland SoccerPlex	4,000
Michigan Stars	Washington, MI	Romeo High School	4,000
Savannah Clovers	Savannah, GA	Memorial Stadium	5,000

=== Personnel and sponsorship ===
Note: The league has signed a deal with Hummel to be the official kit manufacturer, but it still allows clubs to find their own provider.

Team	Head coach	Captain(s)	Kit manufacturer	Shirt sponsor
Albion San Diego	(Spain) Diego Gómez	(United States) Tyler Gabarra	(United States) Capelli	DarkHorse
Chattanooga FC	(United States) Rod Underwood	(Jamaica) Richard Dixon	(Denmark) Hummel	Volkswagen
City Union	(England) Jordan Sullivan	(United States) Mumbi Kwesele	(Denmark) Hummel	—
Club de Lyon	(United States) Victor Balaguer	(Venezuela) Victor Rojas	(Germany) Adidas	—
Gold Star FC	(United States) Alex Lubyansky	(United States) Brandon Barnes	(Germany) Adidas	—
Los Angeles Force	(United States) Matt Morse	(United States) Brandon Gomez	(United States) Xara	—
Maryland Bobcats	(France) Alex Kao	(Ivory Coast) Josselin Possian	(Denmark) Hummel	Holiday Inn College Park
Michigan Stars		(Zimbabwe) Tatenda Mkuruva	(Denmark) Hummel	HTC
Savannah Clovers	(England) David Proctor	(United States) Shandon Wright	(England) Umbro	Castro Wood Floors

=== Coaching changes ===
Team	Outgoing coach	Manner of departure	Date of vacancy	Position in table	Incoming coach	Date of appointment
Albion San Diego	(United States) Jeff Korytoski	Signed by Chattanooga Red Wolves SC	December 14, 2022	Preseason	(Spain) Diego Gómez	February 23, 2023
City Union	(United States) Colton Bly (interim)	End of interim period	February 10, 2023	Preseason	(England) Jordan Sullivan	February 10, 2023
Maryland Bobcats	(Canada) Sylvain Rastello	Resigned	February 21, 2023	Preseason	(France) Alex Kao	March 1, 2023
Los Angeles Force	(Mexico) Jesus Ochoa (interim)	End of interim period	April 23, 2023	5th	(United States) Matt Morse	April 23, 2023

== Regular season ==
The season started on March 31, with the nine teams playing an unbalanced schedule weighted on regional play.

=== Standings ===
Pos	Team	Pld	W	D	L	GF	GA	GD	Pts	Qualification
1	Chattanooga FC (X)	24	15	7	2	41	12	+29	52	Qualification for the semifinals
2	Michigan Stars	24	13	7	4	37	21	+16	46	Qualification for the semifinals
3	Los Angeles Force	24	13	5	6	33	21	+12	44	Qualification for the playoffs
4	Albion San Diego	24	11	8	5	31	21	+10	41	Qualification for the playoffs
5	Maryland Bobcats	24	11	3	10	31	22	+9	36	Qualification for the playoffs
6	City Union (C)	24	8	3	13	30	34	−4	27	Qualification for the playoffs
7	Club de Lyon	24	6	5	13	23	45	−22	23	
8	Savannah Clovers	24	4	7	13	19	47	−28	19	
9	Gold Star FC	24	3	3	18	23	45	−22	12	

Source: nisasoccer.com
Rules for classification: 1) points per game; 2) goal differential; 3) goals for; 4) head-to-head; 5) goals against
(C) Champions; (X) Regular season winner

=== Results ===
Home \ Away	ALB	CHA	FLO	CLY	GOL	LAF	MAR	MIC	SAV	ALB	CHA	FLO	CLY	GOL	LAF	MAR	MIC	SAV	ALB	CHA	FLO	CLY	GOL	LAF	MAR	MIC	SAV
Albion San Diego	—	0–5	2–0	3–1	1–0	2–0	0–0	1–1	0–0	—				3–0	0–0		2–2	4–0	—								
Chattanooga	2–0	—	1–0	1–1	3–0	3–0	1–0	2–0	1–1		—	0–0	1–0	1–1	3–1			5–0		—							
City Union	1–1	0–1	—	2–4	2–0	1–3	0–3	2–3	2–0		0–2	—	1–1		0–1	2–0		4–2			—						
Club de Lyon	1–2		0–3 (Note: Forfeited by Club de Lyon due to lack of approved venue availability.)	—	3–2	0–0	0–3	0–4	1–2	2–1			—				0–2	1–1				—					
Gold Star FC	0–1	1–2	2–3	1–2	—	0–3	2–0	2–3	1–1			1–3		—	0–1	0–1	2–4						—				
L.A. Force	1–1	2–1	2–1	1–0	3–0	—	2–1	1–1	1–1	2–0			4–0		—				2–1			1–0		—			
Maryland Bobcats	0–1	1–2	1–0	5–1	3–1	2–1	—	0–2	4–1		1–1	2–0	0–1			—	0–0	0–1							—		
Michigan Stars	0–1	0–0	2–0	3–1	2–1	2–1	1–2	—	2–0					0–0	1–0	0–2	—									—	
Savannah Clovers	1–4	3–2	0–3	0–1	0–1		2–0	1–1	—		0–1		2–2	0–5			0–1	—									—

Source: nisasoccer.com
Legend: Blue = home team win; Yellow = draw; Red = away team win.

== Playoffs ==
The playoffs will keep the same format from last year, and feature the top six teams from the regular season. The top two teams receive a bye into the semifinals. Teams finishing third through sixth play in the quarterfinals, with the winners being re-seeded before playing in the next round.

=== Bracket ===
Quarterfinal; October 29
3	Los Angeles Force	2
6	Flower City Union	4

Quarterfinal; October 28
4	Albion San Diego (p)	0 (8)
5	Maryland Bobcats FC	0 (7)

Semifinals; November 4/5
1	Chattanooga FC	0 (0)
6	Flower City Union (p)	0 (2)
2	Michigan Stars FC	3
4	Albion San Diego	2

NISA Championship Final; November 11
6	Flower City Union	1
2	Michigan Stars FC	0

=== Schedule ===
==== Quarter-finals ====
October 28, 2023	Albion San Diego	0–0 (a.e.t.) (8–7 p)	Maryland Bobcats FC	San Diego, California
5:30 PM PDT	Shibata (yellow card) 98'	Report	Forka (yellow card) 9'; Richard (yellow card) 24'; Brown (yellow card) 70'; Espinal (yellow card) 96'; Akinkoye (yellow card) 114'	Stadium: Canyon Crest Academy Stadium
	Penalties
	Gabarra (penalty scored); Carreon (penalty scored); Patti (penalty scored); Mitchell (penalty scored); Shibata (penalty scored); Tran (penalty scored); Carreon (penalty scored); Gluvačević (penalty scored)		(penalty scored) Wivell; (penalty scored) Espinal; (penalty scored) Thiam; (penalty scored) Mansour; (penalty scored) Pritchett; (penalty scored) Akinkoye; (penalty scored) Filerman; (penalty missed) Sutton

October 29, 2023	Los Angeles Force	2–4	Flower City Union	Whittier, California
6:00 PM PDT	Avoce 18', 51' (yellow card) 31'; Hale (yellow card) 57' (red card) 85'; Jovel (yellow card) 67'; Echavarría (yellow card) 73'	Report	Diakhate 2', 6'; Cartagena 34'; Ferreira (yellow card) 81'; Elias (yellow card) 84'; Stewart 90+3'	Stadium: Rio Hondo College Stadium

==== Semi-finals ====
November 4, 2023	Michigan Stars FC	3–2	Albion San Diego	Washington Township, Michigan
3:30 PM EST	Chalbaud 23'; Bowie 27'; Baranovskyi (yellow card) 45'; Umeda (yellow card) 56'; Olson 60' (yellow card) 70'	Report	Dalou 15'; Kadono 82'; Pineda (yellow card) 83'	Stadium: Romeo High School

November 5, 2023	Chattanooga FC	0–0 (a.e.t.) (0–2 p)	Flower City Union	Chattanooga, Tennessee
5:00 PM EST	Prepeliță (yellow card) 45'	Report	Cartagena (yellow card) 52'; Cavanaugh (yellow card) 59'	Stadium: Finley Stadium
	Penalties
	Prepeliță (penalty missed); Naglestad (penalty missed); Ibarra (penalty missed); McGrath (penalty missed)		(penalty missed) Ferreira; (penalty scored) Cavanaugh; (penalty missed) Bolduc; (penalty scored) Diakhate

==== NISA Championship Final ====
November 11, 2023	Michigan Stars FC	0–1	Flower City Union	Washington Township, Michigan
	Maric (yellow card) 63'	Report	Ferreira (yellow card) 14' (red card) 75'; Diakhate (yellow card) 35'; Bolduc 52' (yellow card) 90'; Lee (yellow card) 57'; Cavanaugh (yellow card) 70'; Mejia (yellow card) 85'; Cartagena (yellow card) 90'	Stadium: Romeo High School; Attendance: 1,016

== Player statistics ==
As of October 25, 2023

=== Top goalscorers ===
Rank	Player	Club	Goals
1	(Norway) Markus Naglestad	Chattanooga FC	15
2	(Croatia) Leon Maric	Michigan Stars	14
3	(Honduras) Darwin Espinal	Maryland Bobcats	11
4	(United States) Francis Avoce	Los Angeles Force	7
4	(Senegal) Alioune Diakhate	Flower City Union	7
4	(Argentina) Ignacio Ten López	Club de Lyon	7
7	(England) Alex McGrath	Chattanooga FC	6
7	(United States) Hunter Olson	Michigan Stars	6
7	(Mexico) Aldo Quintanilla	Los Angeles Force	6
7	(United States) Cyrus Tran	Michigan Stars	6

=== Clean sheets ===
Rank	Player	Club	Clean sheets
1	(Haiti) Jean Antoine	Chattanooga FC	15
2	(United States) Benjamin Roach	Albion San Diego	12
3	(Zimbabwe) Tatenda Mkuruva	Michigan Stars	10
4	(United States) Brandon Gomez	Los Angeles Force	8
5	(United States) Alexander Sutton	Maryland Bobcats	7
6	(United States) Michael Mejia	City Union	5
7	(United States) Brandon Barnes	Gold Star FC	3
7	(England) Jack Crichton	Savannah Clovers	3
9	(United States) Nick Nelson	Club de Lyon	2
10	(United States) Josue Mazon	Club de Lyon	1
10	(United States Virgin Islands) Dylan Ramos	Gold Star FC	1
10	(Puerto Rico) Joel Serrano	Los Angeles Force	1
10	(Sierra Leone) Sylvanus Thompson	Maryland Bobcats	1

=== Top assists ===
Rank	Player	Club	Assists
1	(Venezuela) Andrés Chalbaud	Michigan Stars	7
1	(United States) Andrew Wivell	Maryland Bobcats	7
3	(Croatia) Leon Maric	Michigan Stars	6
3	(United States) Edwin Rivas	Los Angeles Force	6
5	(Colombia) Daniel Bedoya	Albion San Diego	5
5	(Honduras) Darwin Espinal	Maryland Bobcats	5
5	(United States) Luke Ferreira	Flower City Union	5
5	(United States) Jimmy Filerman	Maryland Bobcats	5
5	(Serbia) Vladimir Jokic	Gold Star FC	5
10	(England) Alex McGrath	Chattanooga FC	4
10	(Argentina) Matias Pourrain	Club de Lyon	4
10	(Venezuela) Victor Rojas	Club de Lyon	4
10	(United States) Junior Rosero	Gold Star FC	4

== Awards ==
=== Individual awards ===
Award	Winner	Team	Reason	Ref.
Golden Boot	(Norway) Markus Naglestad	Chattanooga FC	15 goals in 23 games	
Golden Glove	(Haiti) Jean Antoine	Chattanooga FC	15 shutouts in 23 matches; 9 goals against	
Coach of the Year	(Spain) Diego Gomez	Albion San Diego	11-8-5 record in his debut season	
Golden Ball (Most Valuable Player)	(Honduras) Darwin Espinal	Maryland Bobcats	11 goals, 5 assists in 22 matches	

=== NISA Best XI ===
Goalkeeper	Defenders	Midfielders	Forwards	Ref.
(Haiti) Jean Antoine (CHA)	(United States) Aydan Bowers (CHA) (Jamaica) Richard Dixon (CHA) (United States) Jimmy Filerman (MAR) (Moldova) Anatolie Prepeliță (CHA)	(Colombia) Daniel Bedoya (ALB) (United States) Tyler Gabarra (ALB) (England) Alex McGrath (CHA)	(Honduras) Darwin Espinal (MAR) (Croatia) Leon Maric (MIC) (Norway) Markus Naglestad (CHA)	

=== Player of the Month ===
Month	Winner	Team	Reason	Ref.
April	(Haiti) Jean Antoine	Chattanooga FC	4 clean sheets	
May	(Argentina) Ignacio Ten López	Club de Lyon	4 goals scored	
June	(United States) Edwin Rivas	Los Angeles Force	3 assists in 136 minutes	
July	(United States) Ben Roach	Albion San Diego	3 clean sheets	
August	(Mexico) Aldo Quintanilla	Los Angeles Force	Team went 4-0-0, scored hat-trick	
September	(Colombia) Daniel Bedoya	Albion San Diego	3 goals scored	

=== Coach of the Month ===
Month	Winner	Team	Reason	Ref.
April	(Togo) Alex Kao	Maryland Bobcats FC	2-0-0 in league play; win in US Open Cup	
May	(Spain) Diego Gómez	Albion San Diego	3-1-0 in league play	
June	(United States) Rod Underwood	Chattanooga FC	Undefeated in June	
July	(United States) Rod Underwood	Chattanooga FC	3-1-0 in league play	
August	(United States) Matt Morse	Los Angeles Force	2-2-0 in league play	
September	(Togo) Alex Kao	Maryland Bobcats FC	2-1-0 in league play	

== See also ==
- National Independent Soccer Association
