= Alexis Velela =

American soccer player

Personal information
- Full name: Alexis Alfonso Velela
- Date of birth: April 17, 1998 (age 28)
- Place of birth: San Diego, California, United States
- Height: 5 ft 7 in (1.70 m)
- Position: Defender

Team information
- Current team: San Diego 1904
- Number: 2

Youth career
- San Diego Surf

Senior career*
Years	Team	Apps	(Gls)
2015–2017	New York Cosmos	2	(0)
2017	→ New York Cosmos B (loan)	5	(0)
2017	→ Motril (loan)		
2018	New York Cosmos B	14	(0)
2019	ASC San Diego	15	(0)
2019–	San Diego 1904	5	(0)

International career
2013–2015	United States U18	19	(1)
- * Club domestic league appearances and goals as of 17 March 2020

Alexis Alfonso Velela (born April 17, 1998) is an American soccer player for San Diego 1904 FC in the National Independent Soccer Association.

== Youth ==
Velela was born in San Diego, California and played with his local side San Diego Surf. He is of Mexican descent.

== Professional ==
=== New York Cosmos ===
Velela signed with North American Soccer League side New York Cosmos on August 10, 2015.

=== Motril CF (loan) ===
On August 27, 2017, Velela went out on loan to Spanish Tercera División side CF Motril until December 31, 2017.
