= Lukas Fernandes =

Lukas Fernandes may refer to:

- Lukas Fernandes (footballer) (born 1993), Danish football goalkeeper
- Lukas Fernandes (soccer) (born 1998), American soccer forward
