= Éder Arreola =

American soccer player

Personal information
- Date of birth: November 13, 1991 (age 34)
- Place of birth: Los Angeles, California, U.S.
- Height: 5 ft 6 in (1.68 m)
- Positions: Left midfielder; winger

College career
Years	Team	Apps	(Gls)
2008–2011	UCLA Bruins	80	(8)

Senior career*
Years	Team	Apps	(Gls)
2009	Orange County Blue Star	15	(5)
2012	Cal FC	4	(0)
2012–2013	Delfines	25	(3)
2014	LA Galaxy II	11	(0)
2015	Ventura County Fusion	3	(0)
2016	Shirak	10	(0)
2017	Phoenix Rising	6	(1)
2017–2018	California United II	15	(6)
2018	Shirak	10	(1)
2019	ASC San Diego	5	(0)
2019–2022	San Diego 1904	14	(0)
2022	Albion San Diego	6	(0)
Total		124	(16)

International career
2011	United States U20	1	(0)
- * Club domestic league appearances and goals as of April 16, 2021

Éder Arreola (born November 13, 1991) is an American former professional soccer player.

== Early life ==
Arreola grew up in Chino Hills, California, just outside of Los Angeles County.

== Career ==
=== College and amateur ===
He played four years of college soccer at the University of California, Los Angeles at the age of 16 between 2008 and 2011.

While at college, Arreola also appeared for USL PDL club Orange County Blue Star in 2009.

=== Professional ===
Arreola was drafted 18th in the 2012 MLS Supplemental Draft by the Houston Dynamo, but did not earn a contract with the team.

Arreola was part of the Cal FC team that had a successful US Open Cup run in 2012, and later signed with Mexican third division club Delfines.

In February 2014, Arreola joined LA Galaxy II for their inaugural season in the USL Pro. In 2016, he played in the Armenian Premier League with Shirak SC.

Arreola was signed by Phoenix Rising FC of the United Soccer Leagues on April 28, 2017.

Following the United Soccer League season, Arreola joined California United FC II in the United Premier Soccer League, where he contributed to the team winning the 2017 Fall Season National Championship.

In October 2018, Arreola and fellow American Pablo Cruz left Shirak SC.

In August 2019, he joined San Diego 1904 FC, an expansion team in the National Independent Soccer Association. Following the team's hiatus, he returned to 1904 ahead of the Spring 2021 season.

=== International ===
Arreola was a member of the U.S. residency program in Bradenton, Florida, and played for the U.S. Under-17 for two years. He later moved on to the U-20 national team, whom he has represented the U.S. at the 2011 CONCACAF U-20 Championship 2011 CONCACAF U-20 Championship squads. Has also represented the U.S. in lower ages U-15 & U-16.
