= Abdoulaye Cissoko =

French footballer (born 1999)

Personal information
- Full name: Abdoulaye Cissoko
- Date of birth: 27 December 1999 (age 26)
- Place of birth: Sèvres, France
- Height: 1.88 m (6 ft 2 in)
- Position: Defender

Team information
- Current team: FC Tulsa
- Number: 91

Youth career
- Les Ulis

Senior career*
| Years | Team | Apps | (Gls) |
| 2018–2019 | Les Ulis | 2 | (0) |
| 2019 | San Diego Zest | 11 | (0) |
| 2019–2021 | Tacoma Defiance | 20 | (3) |
| 2019 | → San Diego 1904 (loan) | 2 | (0) |
| 2021–2023 | Seattle Sounders | 26 | (0) |
| 2022–2023 | → Tacoma Defiance (loan) | 30 | (12) |
| 2024 | Memphis 901 | 29 | (1) |
| 2025– | FC Tulsa | 45 | (0) |
- * Club domestic league appearances and goals as of 11 November 2026

Abdoulaye "AB" Cissoko (born 27 December 1999) is a French professional footballer who plays as a defender for USL Championship club FC Tulsa.

== Career ==
Cissoko appeared for his local side Les Ulis, playing in the French Championnat National 3, in both 2018 and 2019. In 2019, Cissoko moved to the United States to play with third-tier side San Diego 1904 in the NISA.

Following his time with San Diego Zest, Cissoko moved to USL Championship side Tacoma Defiance on 6 September 2019. He was immediately loaned to NISA side San Diego 1904 ahead of their inaugural season.

On 21 May 2021, Cissoko moved up to MLS side Seattle Sounders FC, the parent club of Tacoma. On 19 June 2021, following the international break, Cissoko made his debut for the Sounders in an away win against the Western Conference rivals, Los Angeles Galaxy.

Following his release from Seattle at the end of the 2023 season, Cissoko joined USL Championship side Memphis 901 on 2 February 2024, signing a multi-year deal. In his 2024 season, he led the team in blocks (20) and percentage aerial duels won (61 of 98) in 30 appearances.

After the dissolution of Memphis 901, Cissoko was signed by Championship club FC Tulsa in 2025.

== Personal life ==
Born in France, Cissoko is of Senegalese descent.

== Career statistics ==
=== Club ===
As of match played 8 July 2021

Appearances and goals by club, season and competition
| Club | Season | League | | | National Cup | | Other | | Total | |
| Club | Season | Division | Apps | Goals | Apps | Goals | Apps | Goals | Apps | Goals |
|---|---|---|---|---|---|---|---|---|---|---|
| Les Ulis | 2017–18 | National 3 | 1 | 0 | 0 | 0 | — | | 1 | 0 |
| Les Ulis | 2018–19 | National 3 | 1 | 0 | 0 | 0 | — | | 1 | 0 |
| Les Ulis | Total | | 2 | 0 | 0 | 0 | 0 | 0 | 2 | 0 |
| San Diego Zest | 2019 | USL League Two | 11 | 0 | 0 | 0 | — | | 11 | 0 |
| Tacoma Defiance | 2019 | USL | 12 | 1 | — | | — | | 12 | 1 |
| Tacoma Defiance | 2020 | USL | 3 | 1 | — | | — | | 3 | 1 |
| Tacoma Defiance | Total | | 15 | 2 | 0 | 0 | 0 | 0 | 15 | 2 |
| San Diego 1904 (loan) | 2019 | NISA | 2 | 0 | — | | — | | 2 | 0 |
| Seattle Sounders FC | 2021 | MLS | 5 | 0 | 0 | 0 | — | | 5 | 0 |
| Career total | | | 35 | 2 | 0 | 0 | 0 | 0 | 35 | 2 |
