= Milo Barton =

English footballer (born 1998)

Personal information
- Full name: Milo Barton
- Date of birth: July 29, 1998 (age 28)
- Place of birth: England
- Height: 6 ft 1 in (1.85 m)
- Position: Forward

Team information
- Current team: San Diego 1904
- Number: 98

Youth career
- –2015: Del Mar Carmel Valley Sharks
- 2016–2017: Seattle Sounders

Senior career*
Years	Team	Apps	(Gls)
2016–2017	Seattle Sounders 2	7	(0)
2019–	San Diego 1904	3	(0)
- * Club domestic league appearances and goals as of March 17, 2020

Milo Barton (born July 29, 1998) is an English footballer who plays as a forward for San Diego 1904 FC in the National Independent Soccer Association.

== Career ==
=== Youth ===
In 2008, Barton moved with his family to San Diego when his father was named as the U-18 coach for Los Angeles Galaxy of Major League Soccer.

While playing for the Cathedral Catholic High School boys soccer team, Barton was named to the 2015 and 2016 All-San Diego Section first teams, and won player of the year for the 2016 season.

After originally being committed to play soccer for UC Santa Barbara, Barton opted to instead join the Sounders' academy system. On August 1, 2016, during an interview done by Barton's father, it was announced Barton had signed to be a part of the Sounders' academy.

=== Professional ===
Barton made his professional debut with Seattle Sounders FC 2 on September 24, 2016, in a 2–0 loss to Swope Park Rangers in the last match of the 2016 season. Barton appeared for 61 minutes before being subbed off. He made his first start on May 28, 2017, in a 2–2 draw against Sacramento Republic FC.

In late 2019 Barton was signed by San Diego 1904 FC ahead of the team's inaugural season in the newly established National Independent Soccer Association.

== International career ==
In October 2016, Barton was called up by Brad Friedel to the USA under-19 side for a training camp and friendly against Club Tijuana.

== Personal life ==
Barton was born to Warren and Candy Barton. His father, Warren Barton, is an English former footballer and currently a television pundit for Fox Sports in the United States. Barton is one of three children, and is older than his younger brothers Kane and Tye.

== Career statistics ==
As of June 6, 2017

Club	Season	League			Playoffs			Total		
Club	Season	Apps	Goals	Assists	Apps	Goals	Assists	Apps	Goals	Assists
Seattle Sounders FC 2	2016	1	0	0	0	0	0	1	0	0
Seattle Sounders FC 2	2017	4	0	0	0	0	0	4	0	0
Seattle Sounders FC 2 total		5	0	0	0	0	0	5	0	0
Career total		5	0	0	0	0	0	5	0	0
