= Gold Star FC =

Gold Star FC Detroit
- Full name: Gold Star FC Detroit
- Nickname(s): Gold Star
- Founded: 2022
- Owner: Daniel Milstein
- Head Coach: Alex Lubyansky
- League: National Independent Soccer Association
- Website: https://goldstardetroit.com/
Home colors	Away colors

Gold Star FC Detroit is an American professional soccer team based in Livonia, Michigan in Metro Detroit, that is an inactive member of the National Independent Soccer Association (NISA), on the third tier of the United States soccer league system.

== History ==
=== Founding ===
On July 22, 2022, after Gold Star Sports Management Group, led by Ukrainian-American Entrepreneur, Daniel Milstein, announced to acquire an Andorran football club FC Santa Coloma, the club was established on the same day after being granted entry into the National Independent Soccer Association (NISA). On October 18, 2022, Gold Star FC Detroit announced that the team's CEO and general manager, Alex Lubyansky would be the first head coach for their inaugural season.

=== Financial struggles ===
Just two months into their inaugural season, it was reported Gold Star FC Detroit had lost its funding source and was "in deep (financial) trouble".

=== First season ===
In the 2023 season, Gold Star FC finished ninth out of nine clubs in the single table, with a record of 3 wins, 3 draws, 18 losses, and 12 points from 24 games.

=== Hiatus ===
On February 16, 2024, the league announced that Gold Star would go on hiatus for the 2024 season. The club will be under new ownership, with plans to re-brand and return to play in 2025.

== Stadium ==
Gold Star FC Detroit announced it would construct a 5,000 capacity stadium on the grounds of Madonna University, behind the former Ladywood High School in Livonia, Michigan.

The team intended to play in the newly built stadium for its first home match in Spring 2023, but that deadline came with no progress. On May 11, two months into the season, the club confirmed that it would indeed be playing all its games in Madonna University's existing stadium. By September, the planned new stadium had been abandoned over a lack of financing.
