= Jordan Saling =

Puerto Rican footballer (born 1996)

Personal information
- Date of birth: March 15, 1996 (age 30)
- Place of birth: Paterson, New Jersey, United States
- Height: 1.78 m (5 ft 10 in)
- Positions: Midfielder; forward

Team information
- Current team: Flower City Union
- Number: 8

College career
| Years | Team | Apps | (Gls) |
| 2016–2017 | Herkimer Generals | 20 | (12) |
| 2017–2018 | Wilmington Wildcats | 4 | (0) |
| 2018–2019 | William Paterson Pioneers | 38 | (12) |

Senior career*
| Years | Team | Apps | (Gls) |
| 2018 | FC Monmouth | 9 | (4) |
| 2019 | KF Laçi | | |
| 2019 | Cedar Stars Rush | 1 | (0) |
| 2020 | Hartford Athletic | 0 | (0) |
| 2021– | Flower City Union | 14 | (0) |

International career^{‡}
| 2021– | Puerto Rico | 1 | (0) |
- * Club domestic league appearances and goals as of October 16, 2022 ‡ National team caps and goals as of 17:24, 3 June 2021 (UTC)

Jordan Saling (born March 15, 1996) is a footballer who plays as a midfielder for Flower City Union in the National Independent Soccer Association. Born in the mainland United States, he represents the Puerto Rico national team.

== Youth career ==
Raised in Haledon, New Jersey, Saling played for Parsippany SC, NASA United, and Paramus Catholic High School in his youth.

== College career ==
For the 2016/2017 season, Saling played college soccer for the Generals of Herkimer County Community College. He was the team's second-top scorer with twelve goals while adding nine assists as he started all twenty of the team's matches. He was named national player of the week, first team All Mountain Valley, first team All-Region, and to the NSCAA All East Team. For the 2017/18 season he transferred to Wilmington University. He made four appearances for the team that year after complications caused by a broken wrist early in the season. In 2018, he transferred once again and played for William Paterson Pioneers for the following two seasons. In total he started all thirty eight matches that he played, tallying twelve goals and three assists.

== Club career ==
In 2018 Saling briefly joined Atlanta Silverbacks FC of the National Premier Soccer League. In 2018 he played for fellow-NPSL side FC Monmouth. He was the team's top scorer that season with four goals in nine appearances. Also following the 2018 season he was named to the Keystone Conference Best XI team. Saling moved abroad in summer 2019 and had a 3-month stint with KF Laçi of the Albanian Kategoria Superiore. After returning to the United States in August of that year, he joined Cedar Stars Rush of the USL League Two. He made one league appearance for the club that season.

Saling joined National Independent Soccer Association expansion side Flower City Union in November 2021.

== International career ==
Saling made his senior international debut for Puerto Rico on June 2, 2021, in a 2022 FIFA World Cup qualification match against the Bahamas. He came on as a 74th-minute substitute in the eventual 7–0 victory.

== Career statistics ==
=== International ===
As of match played June 2, 2021

| National team | Year | Apps | Goals |
|---|---|---|---|
| Puerto Rico | 2021 | 1 | 0 |
| Total | | 1 | 0 |
