= Brandon Zambrano =

American soccer player (born 1995)

Personal information
- Full name: Brandon Zambrano Lopez
- Date of birth: 20 November 1995 (age 30)
- Place of birth: Tijuana, Mexico
- Height: 1.80 m (5 ft 11 in)
- Position: Winger

Team information
- Current team: Kaya–Iloilo
- Number: 6

Youth career
- University City High School
- –2014: Nomads SC
- 2016: Sounders FC

College career
| Years | Team | Apps | (Gls) |
| 2014–2018 | Portland University | 58 | (6) |

Senior career*
| Years | Team | Apps | (Gls) |
| 2015 | FC Tucson | | |
| 2017 | Lane United | 9 | (0) |
| 2018–2019 | Real Zamora | | |
| 2019–2021 | San Diego 1904 | 5 | (1) |
| 2023–2024 | Escondido FC | | |
| 2024 | Capo FC | 12 | (4) |
| 2024–2025 | Stallion Laguna | 4 | (0) |
| 2025 | Maharlika | 5 | (9) |
| 2025– | Kaya–Iloilo | 18 | (11) |
- * Club domestic league appearances and goals as of 6:44, 8 June 2026 (UTC)

Brandon Zambrano Lopez (born 20 November 1995) is an American professional soccer player who plays as a midfielder for Philippines Football League club Kaya–Iloilo.

== Personal life ==
Zambrano was born to Mexican parents in Tijuana, Mexico, but migrated with his family to San Diego at nine years old. There, he started playing football as a kid with his brother Edwin.

== Club career ==
=== Youth ===
Zambrano played youth football in San Diego, both for local club Nomads SC and for University City High School. In 2016, he also had a short spell with the youth team of Major League Soccer side Sounders. In 2014 he signed for the Pilots of the University of Portland, where he reunited with childhood friend Rey Ortiz. He made 19 appearances in his freshman season, including a hat-trick in a game against Saint Mary's. He earned an All-WCC Honorable Mention in 2016 and graduated from Portland in 2018, having made 58 appearances in total.

=== Early pro career ===
While playing college soccer at Portland, Zambrano also played amateur and professional soccer for a number of teams in the lower American leagues. He first played with FC Tucson in 2015, and later with Lane United in 2017, where he made 9 appearances.

After graduating, Zambrano returned to Mexico to play for Real Zamora, and went back to the States to play for San Diego 1904. After another short spell at Escondido, he spent a half season at Capo FC, where he made 12 appearances and scored four goals.

=== Career in the Philippines ===
In mid-2024, Zambrano moved to the Philippines, where he signed as a midfielder for Stallion Laguna of the Philippines Football League, where he made his debut on the opening matchday in a win over Maharlika. In the mid-season, he transferred from Stallion to Maharlika, tallying 5 appearances.

Before the 2025–26 season, Zambrano signed with defending PFL champions Kaya–Iloilo. He scored his first goal in the country in a win over rivals Dynamic Herb Cebu, and made 16 league appearances as well as 6 continental appearances in the AFC Champions League Two.
