= Luke Ferreira =

American soccer player (born 1995)

Personal information
- Full name: Luke Vincent Ferreira
- Date of birth: July 2, 1995 (age 31)
- Place of birth: New Jersey, United States
- Height: 1.83 m (6 ft 0 in)
- Positions: Attacking midfielder; forward

Team information
- Current team: Flower City Union
- Number: 10

Youth career
- 1998–2010: Boca United
- 2011: Fluminense
- 2012–2013: Sertanense
- 2013–2014: A.D. Estação

College career
Years	Team	Apps	(Gls)
2015	EFSC Titans		
2016	Stetson Hatters	16	(4)

Senior career*
Years	Team	Apps	(Gls)
2017	Palm Beach Suns	11	(3)
2017	Boca Raton FC	0	(0)
2018–2019	Jerv	46	(4)
2020	Colorado Springs Switchbacks	14	(1)
2022	Chattanooga FC	7	(0)
2023–	Flower City Union	23	(5)
- * Club domestic league appearances and goals as of April 2, 2023

Luke Vincent Ferreira (born April 2, 1995) is an American soccer player who currently plays for Flower City Union in the National Independent Soccer Association.

== Career ==
=== Youth ===
Ferreira spent time with Fluminense in Brazil, and Sertanense and A.D. Estação in Portugal.

=== College and amateur ===
Ferreira returned to the United States to play college soccer at Eastern Florida State College in 2015, before transferring to Stetson University for the 2016 season, where he made 16 appearances, scoring 4 goals and tallying 4 assists.

In 2017, following college, Ferriera appeared for both USL PDL side Palm Beach Suns and NPSL side Boca Raton FC, but didn't make a first team league appearance for the club.

=== Professional ===
Ferreira joined Norwegian 1. divisjon club FK Jerv, where he played for two seasons.

On December 18, 2019, Ferreira joined USL Championship side Colorado Springs Switchbacks ahead of their 2020 season. He made his professional debut ion July 18, 2020, appearing as an 82nd-minute substitute in a 3–3 draw with Real Monarchs.

On March 1, 2022, Ferreira signed with National Independent Soccer Association side Chattanooga FC.

== Personal ==
Ferreira also holds citizenship with Portugal and Brazil through his parents.

Ferreira was born in New Jersey, but grew up in Deerfield Beach, Florida.
