= Macklin Robinson =

American soccer player

Macklin R. Robinson
Personal information
- Date of birth: April 2, 1994 (age 32)
- Place of birth: Cooperstown, New York, United States
- Position: Goalkeeper

Team information
- Current team: AC Syracuse Pulse
- Number: 1

College career
Years	Team	Apps	(Gls)
2012–2013	Ohio Dominican Panthers	28	(0)
2014–2015	DePaul Blue Demons	34	(0)

Senior career*
Years	Team	Apps	(Gls)
2016–2017	North Carolina FC	5	(0)
2017	→ Pittsburgh Riverhounds (loan)	1	(0)
2018	New York Cosmos	4	(0)
2019–2020	Tampa Bay Rowdies	5	(0)
2022–	AC Syracuse Pulse	12	(0)
- * Club domestic league appearances and goals as of 14 April 2022

Macklin Robinson (born April 2, 1994) is an American professional soccer player who plays as a goalkeeper for AC Syracuse Pulse.

== Career ==
Robinson played two years of college soccer at Ohio Dominican University between 2012 and 2013, before transferring to DePaul University, where he played in 2014 and 2015.

On April 27, 2016, Robinson signed with North American Soccer League side Carolina RailHawks. Now known as North Carolina FC, he played two years with notable performances against, Swansea City, at the time an English Premier League team, and eventual NASL champions the San Francisco Deltas.

Robinson was loaned to United Soccer League club Pittsburgh Riverhounds on June 30, 2017.

On 6 February 2019, Robinson signed with the Tampa Bay Rowdies of the USL Championship. His Rowdies team would eventually go on to win the USL Eastern conference title and become Co-USL-Champions during the 2020 Covid Pandemic.

On 24 March 2022, Robinson signed with a new expansion team based in Syracuse, New York, AC Syracuse Pulse.
