= Cyrus Tran =

American soccer player (born 1994)

Cyrus Ryuichi Tran 谷口 サイラス 龍一
Personal information
- Full name: Cyrus Ryuichi Taniguchi (谷口 サイラス 龍一)
- Date of birth: 4 October 1994 (age 32)
- Place of birth: Honolulu, Hawaii, United States
- Height: 1.76 m (5 ft 9 in)
- Position: Midfielder

Youth career
- Meito Club
- –2013: Machida Zelvia
- 2013–2017: International Budo University

Senior career*
Years	Team	Apps	(Gls)
2017–2020	Paradise Soccer Club		
2020–2021	FC Arizona		
2021–2022	Michigan Stars	24	(0)
2023	Albion San Diego	18	(6)
2024	Becamex Binh Duong	4	(0)
- * Club domestic league appearances and goals as of June 25, 2024

Cyrus Ryuichi Taniguchi (谷口 サイラス 龍一, Taniguchi Sairasu Ryuichi; born October 4, 1994), also known as Cyrus Tran, is an American professional soccer player who last played for V.League 1 club Becamex Binh Duong.

== Career ==
Taniguchi was born in Honolulu, Hawaii to a Vietnamese father from Saigon and a Japanese mother. He moved to Japan with his family when he was 6 years old. He joined the youth academy of Machida Zelvia and played there until 2013. He then attended the International Budo University.

He started his senior career playing for NPSL side FC Arizona before signing for National Independent Soccer Association clubs Michigan Stars and then Albion San Diego.

In March 2024, Taniguchi joined Vietnamese club Becamex Binh Duong as a free agent. On 31 March 2024, Taniguchi made his professional with Becamex Binh Duong in the V.League 1, coming in as a substitute in his team's 0–2 away defeat against Hong Linh Ha Tinh.
