= Tony López (soccer) =

American soccer player

Personal information
- Full name: Anthony Edward López-Carillo
- Date of birth: November 13, 1997 (age 28)
- Place of birth: Northridge, California, United States
- Height: 1.85 m (6 ft 1 in)
- Positions: Fullback; forward

Youth career
- –2016: FC Golden State

College career
Years	Team	Apps	(Gls)
2016–2017	UC Riverside Highlanders	31	(2)

Senior career*
Years	Team	Apps	(Gls)
2017	Orange County SC U23	3	(0)
2018	Rio Claro		
2019	1. FCA Darmstadt	15	(14)
2020–2022	California United Strikers	42	(10)
2023	Pittsburgh Riverhounds	6	(0)
2025–	Ventura County Fusion		
- * Club domestic league appearances and goals as of July 3, 2023

Anthony Edward López-Carillo (born November 13, 1997) is an American soccer player who plays as a forward or midfielder for USL League Two club Ventura County Fusion.

== Career ==
=== Youth ===
López was part of the USSDA side FC Golden State's academy team until 2016. He also attended Sylmar High School.

=== College and amateur ===
In 2016, López attended the University of California, Riverside to play college soccer. In two seasons with the Highlanders, López made 31 appearances, scoring two goals and adding four assists. In 2017, he also appeared for USL PDL side Orange County SC U23.

=== Professional ===
After two years in college, López left early to pursue a professional career. He joined Brazilian second division side Rio Claro in 2018, before moving to Germany, where he scored 14 goals in 15 appearances for seventh-tier side 1. FCA Darmstadt. During this time there are reports of López having spells with SV Rot-Weiss Walldorf, Ventura County Fusion and an unnamed club in the United Premier Soccer League.

Following a successful open tryout in December 2019, López signed with National Independent Soccer Association side California United Strikers. He went on to score ten goals in 42 appearances.

On February 28, 2023, López signed with USL Championship club Pittsburgh Riverhounds prior to their 2023 season. Despite his injury, López's contract was not extended, and the player became a free agent.

In 2025, Lopez joined USL League Two club Ventura County Fusion and was an unused substitute in their 3–1 defeat to AV Alta FC on 18 March in the U.S. Open Cup.
