= Ozzie Ramos =

American soccer player (born 1996)

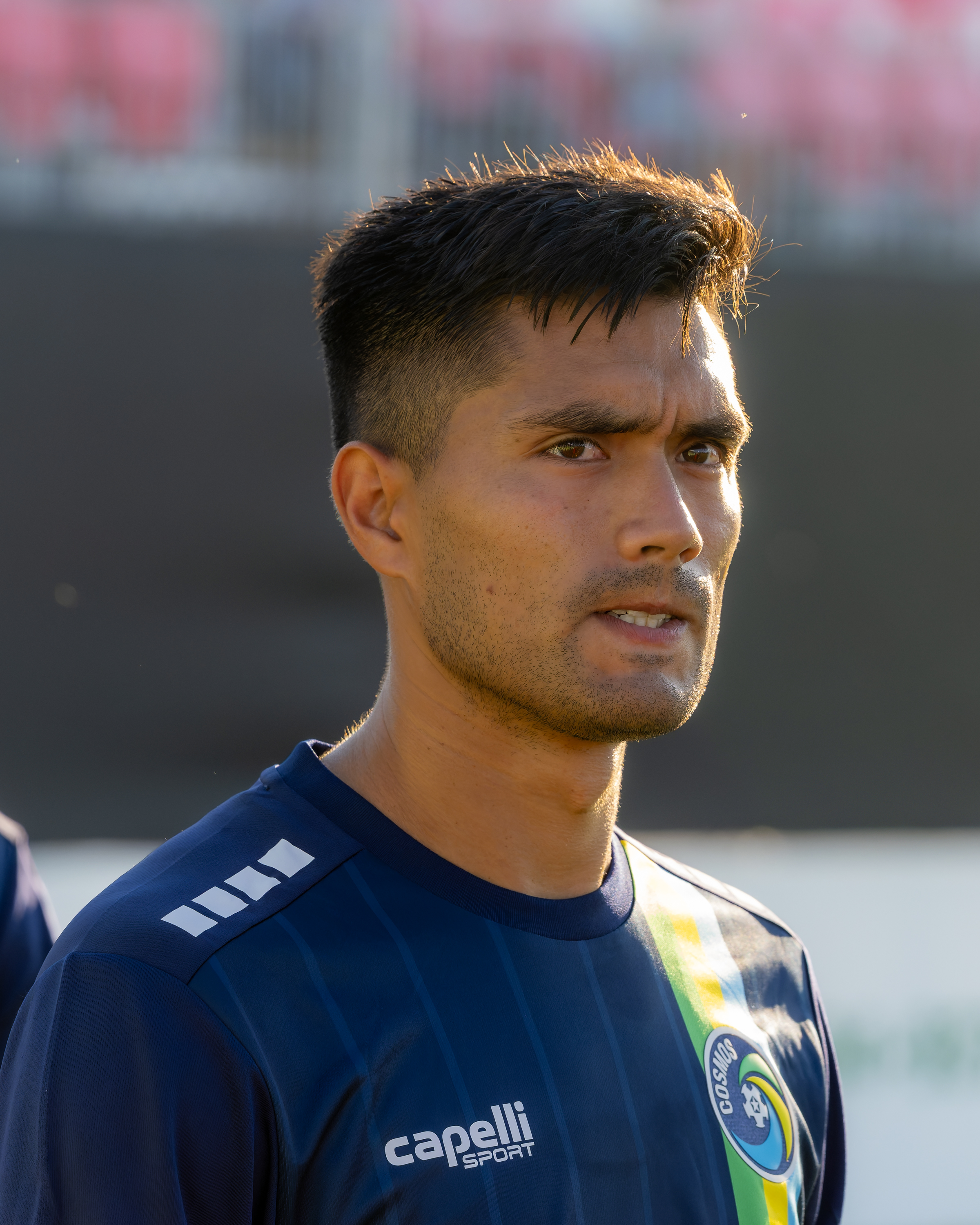
- Ramos with the NY Cosmos in 2026

Personal information
- Date of birth: September 11, 1996 (age 30)
- Place of birth: Modesto, California, United States
- Height: 1.73 m (5 ft 8 in)
- Position: Midfielder

College career
Years	Team	Apps	(Gls)
2014–2015	San Diego State Aztecs	38	(2)
2016–2017	Seattle Redhawks	39	(1)

Senior career*
Years	Team	Apps	(Gls)
2015–2017	FC Tucson	28	(2)
2019–2020	San Diego 1904	8	(1)
2020	Atlético Jalisco	3	(0)
2021–2022	Albion San Diego	25	(1)
2022–2023	Central Valley Fuego	52	(1)
2023	Forward Madison	7	(0)
2024	Carolina Core	7	(0)
2025	Texoma FC	27	(0)
2026	New York Cosmos	15	(1)
- * Club domestic league appearances and goals as of November 6, 2026

Ozzie Ramos (born September 11, 1996) is an American soccer player who plays as a midfielder forUSL League One club New York Cosmos.

== Career ==
=== College and amateur ===
Ramos began playing for San Diego State University in the fall of 2014, making 19 appearances in his freshman season. Following his sophomore season, Ramos transferred to Seattle University. During his senior season, he was listed as an All-Western Athletic Conference Team Honorable Mention.

While in college, Ramos made appearances with FC Tucson in the Premier Development League.

=== Sab Diego 1904 ===
In September 2019, Ramos signed his first professional contract with local side San Diego 1904. He made his professional debut on September 10, 2019, appearing as a starter in a 2-0 loss to Los Angeles Force.

=== Atlético Jalisco ===
Following a successful tryout, Ramos signed for Liga de Balompié Mexicano club Atlético Jalisco in August 2020. He made his competitive debut for the club in October of that year, before the club folded three matches into the 2020–21 season. He appeared in the clubs first three matches before the club had to fold due to financial and administrative issues.

=== Albion San Diego ===
Ramos returned to the United States and signed for Albion San Diego for the 2021 season. Ramos appeared in 25 matches scoring 1 goal for San Diego.

=== Central Valley Fuego ===
In February 2022, Ramos joined USL League One expansion club Central Valley Fuego FC ahead of their inaugural season. He made his competitive debut for the club in its opening match of the season, tallying 71 minutes in a 2–0 victory over the Greenville Triumph. He scored his first and only goal for the club on April 8, 2022, finding the net in the 39th minute of a 3–3 away draw against the Charlotte Independence.

=== Forward Madison ===
On September 7, 2023, it was announced that Central Valley Fuego FC would transfer Ramos to fellow USL League One side Forward Madison FC in exchange for a 2024 international roster spot. Following his transfer to Forward Madison FC, Ramos made six regular-season appearances and one postseason appearance, helping the club qualify for the 2023 USL League One Playoffs for the first time since 2019, where they fell 4–1 to Northern Colorado Hailstorm FC in the quarterfinals.

=== Carolina Core ===
Ramos signed with MLS Next Pro club Carolina Core on August 5, 2024. Ramos would go on to make 7 appearance for the side.

=== Texoma FC ===
Ramos signed with USL League One side Texoma FC during March 2025 ahead of the clubs inaugural season. He went on to play in 30 matches in all competitions with 1 assist that year during the club's only professional campaign.

=== New York Cosmos ===
On August 3, 2026, Ramos signed with the New York Cosmos midway through their 2026 USL League One campaign. He quickly established himself in the starting lineup, making 15 appearances to close out the season. On October 21, 2026, Ramos scored his first goal for the club in a 3–3 draw against Spokane Velocity FC.

== Personal life ==
Born in the United States, Ramos is of Mexican descent.

== Career statistics ==
As of November 6, 2026

Appearances and goals by club, season and competition
Club	Season	League			National Cup		League Cup		Playoffs		Total	
Club	Season	Division	Apps	Goals	Apps	Goals	Apps	Goals	Apps	Goals	Apps	Goals
FC Tucson	2015	PDL	13	1	—	—	—	—	—	—	13	1
FC Tucson	2016	PDL	8	1	—	—	—	—	2	1	10	2
FC Tucson	2017	PDL	7	0	—	—	—	—	1	0	8	0
FC Tucson	Total		28	2	—	—	—	—	3	1	31	3
San Diego 1904	2019	NISA	6	0	—	—	—	—	—	—	6	0
San Diego 1904	2020	NISA	2	1	—	—	—	—	—	—	2	1
San Diego 1904	2021	NISA	25	1	—	—	—	—	—	—	25	1
San Diego 1904	Total		33	2	—	—	—	—	—	—	33	2
Central Valley Fuego	2022	USL League One	30	1	2	0	—	—	—	—	32	1
Central Valley Fuego	2023	USL League One	22	0	1	0	—	—	—	—	23	0
Central Valley Fuego	Total		52	1	3	0	—	—	—	—	55	1
Forward Madison	2023	USL League One	6	0	—	—	—	—	1	0	7	0
Carolina Core	2024	MLS Next Pro	7	0	—	—	—	—	—	—	7	0
Texoma FC	2025	USL League One	27	0	1	0	2	0	—	—	30	0
New York Cosmos	2026	USL League One	15	1	0	0	0	0	—	—	15	1
Career Total			168	6	4	0	2	0	4	1	178	7
