= Lukas Fernandes (soccer) =

American soccer player

Personal information
- Date of birth: February 26, 1998 (age 28)
- Place of birth: Rochester, New York, United States
- Height: 5 ft 10 in (1.78 m)
- Position: Forward

College career
Years	Team	Apps	(Gls)
2016–2019	Temple Owls	55	(10)

Senior career*
Years	Team	Apps	(Gls)
2017–2019	Rochester Lancers	29	(7)
2020	Pittsburgh Riverhounds	12	(2)
2021	Rochester Lancers		
2022	Flower City Union	16	(4)

Managerial career
- 2022–: Temple Owls (assistant)
- * Club domestic league appearances and goals as of 26 July 2022

Lukas Fernandes (born February 26, 1998) is an American soccer player and coach who is currently an assistant with the Temple Owls men's soccer team.

== Career ==
=== College ===
Fernandes played four years of college soccer at Temple University between 2016 and 2019, where he scored 10 goals and tallied 9 assists in 55 appearances for the Owls.

While at college, Fernandes played with Rochester Lancers in both the NPSL and the MASL.

=== Professional ===
Fernandes signed his first professional deal with USL Championship club Pittsburgh Riverhounds on December 19, 2019, ahead of their 2020 season. He made his professional debut on July 12, 2020, appearing as an injury time substitute during a 3–1 win over Louisville City FC. Fernandes scored his first professional goal on July 19, 2020, during a 6–0 win over Philadelphia Union II.

Fernandes was dropped by the Riverhounds after the 2020 season. He signed with the Rochester Lancers again in 2021.

=== Coaching ===
In July 2022, Fernandes left the Flower City Union to join the coaching staff at his alma mater, Temple University.
