= Alioune Diakhate =

Senegalese footballer

Personal information
- Date of birth: 10 April 1994 (age 32)
- Place of birth: Dakar, Senegal
- Height: 1.80 m (5 ft 11 in)
- Position: Forward

Team information
- Current team: Flower City Union
- Number: 9

Youth career
- 2008–2009: Katane

Senior career*
Years	Team	Apps	(Gls)
2009–2010	Jappo		(9)
2010–2013	Académie Mawade Wade		
2013–2015	ASC Walli Dann		(14)
2014–2015	→ RS YOFF (loan)		(8)
2015–2016	FC Obukhiv		(20)
2016–2017	Tadamon Sour		
2017–2018	C.D. Oller		
2019	Indy Eleven	15	(1)
2021	FC Tucson	4	(0)
2022	Albion San Diego	20	(12)
2023–	Flower City Union	1	(0)
- * Club domestic league appearances and goals as of April 2, 2023

Alioune Diakhate (born 10 April 1994) is a Senegalese professional footballer who plays as a forward for Flower City Union in the National Independent Soccer Association.

== Career ==
Diakhate signed with FC Tucson on 23 September 2021.

On 31 March 2022, Albion San Diego of the National Independent Soccer Association announced that they signed Diakhate ahead of their 2022 season.
