= Elijah Amo =

American soccer player (born 1999)

Personal information
- Date of birth: February 3, 1999 (age 27)
- Place of birth: Silver Spring, Maryland, United States
- Height: 5 ft 10 in (1.78 m)
- Position: Winger

Team information
- Current team: Virginia Dream
- Number: 7

Youth career
- 2008–2017: Bethesda SC

College career
Years	Team	Apps	(Gls)
2017–2020	Louisville Cardinals	60	(6)

Senior career*
Years	Team	Apps	(Gls)
2022	Maryland Bobcats	19	(5)
2023	South Georgia Tormenta	27	(0)
2024	Maryland Bobcats	13	(2)
2025–	Virginia Dream	0	(0)
- * Club domestic league appearances and goals as of October 18, 2024

Elijah Amo (born February 3, 1999) is an American soccer player who plays as a winger for Maryland Bobcats in the NISA.

== Career ==
=== Youth and college ===
Amo joined Bethesda SC in 2008 and remained part of the academy until 2017. He helped the team win the Maryland State Cup and US Youth Soccer Region 1 Championship in 2012. Amo graduated Cum Laude from Southern High School and was a four-year honor roll member. He also lettered in basketball at Southern High School from 2014 to 2015.

In 2017, Amo attended the University of Louisville to play college soccer. Over four seasons with the Cardinals, Amo made 60 appearances, scoring six goals and tallying four assists.

=== Professional ===
On January 21, 2021, Amo was selected 34th overall in the 2021 MLS SuperDraft by Real Salt Lake. However, he went unsigned by the club.

In 2022, Amo signed with National Independent Soccer Association side Maryland Bobcats. He made 19 regular season appearances for the Bobcats, scoring five goals.

On January 18, 2023, Amo signed with USL League One side South Georgia Tormenta. He made his debut for Tormenta on March 17, 2023, appearing as an 80th-minute substitute during a 1–0 win over North Carolina FC.

After being released by Tormenta following their 2023 season, Amo returned to the NISA to play with Maryland Bobcats in 2024.

Amo appeared for National Premier Soccer League side Virginia Dream during their US Open Cup run in 2025.

== Personal ==
Amo is cousins with fellow US soccer player Joe Gyau. He comes from a soccer family where his father played and his younger brother is currently a soccer player with Stevenson University.
