= Syracuse Pulse =

- Nickname: Pulse
- Founded: 2021
- Dissolved: 2022; 4 years ago (merged into Flower City Union)
- Stadium: Lazer Stadium
- Capacity: 2,000
- President: Samir Belhseine
- Head Coach: Peter Fuller
- League: NISA; United Women's Soccer
- Website: syracusepulse.com

Syracuse Pulse, initially AC Syracuse Pulse, was an American professional soccer club based in Syracuse, New York. The Pulse fielded a men's team in the National Independent Soccer Association (NISA), the third tier of the US soccer pyramid, during the 2022 season before merging with the Flower City Union.

== History ==
=== Founding ===
In May 2021, an ownership group led by local businessman Samir Belhseine announced an application to join the National Independent Soccer Association for 2022. The team, initially just called "AC Syracuse", announced plans to develop an academy system along with a women's soccer team that would compete in United Women's Soccer. The team also announced a fan-vote for the community to pick the club mascot, with the top 32 names at the end of the voting submission window entered into a bracket and a winner announced at the New York State Fair.

On October 26, the team was officially accepted into NISA after being approved by the league's Board of Governors. The team also announced its new team nickname "Syracuse Pulse" and logo the same day in a local press conference. Former C.F. União assistant manager and Cayman Islands youth national team manager Cláudio Garcia was announced as the first-ever team manager, but was replaced before the season by former Chattanooga FC coach Peter Fuller.

=== 2022 Season ===
The Pulse entered their inaugural season in a rushed fashion; the club's first training session was March 19, just seven days before their first league match. Nevertheless, they won that inaugural game over Upstate New York rival Flower City Union.

The Pulse finished the 2022 season 7-4-11, good for sixth place and the last playoff spot. They were eliminated from the playoffs in the first round, 2-0, by eventual league champions Michigan Stars FC.

=== Merger ===
"Salt City Union" kit, used for home matches in Syracuse. The team played their first (and only) NISA season in 2023, crowning champions

On January 17, 2023, Syracuse Pulse ceased to exist as a separate club after they merged with fellow expansion team Flower City Union based in Rochester, New York. The combined club played home matches in both cities; for home games in Syracuse the club played under the name "Salt City Union" with its own logo, uniforms, and color scheme.

After winning the 2023 NISA championship in its first season as a combined club, Flower City Union announced its departure from the league in a statement on February 15, 2024. NISA responded with a press release saying "goodbye to our reigning champions". Five days later, Flower City were announced as new members of the semi-professional National Premier Soccer League.

The Salt City identity has been abandoned with the move to the NPSL, and Flower City Union no longer plays any home games in Syracuse.

== Ground ==
AC Syracuse Pulse played their home games at Lazer Stadium on the campus of Onondaga Community College in Syracuse, New York.

During their time as Salt City Union, the club played home games at Falcon Park in Auburn, New York.

== Planned Women's Team ==
On December 10, 2021, the United Women's Soccer league announced that the a new Pulse women's team had been accepted into the league for the 2022 season. Syracuse native and former UWS player Brooke Barbuto was also announced as the team's first head coach. In May 2022, the league announced that the Pulse would not be playing after all "due to unforeseen circumstances".

== Proposed Moroccan Academy ==
Ahead of its inaugural season, team management from The Pulse and NISA visited Morocco, Belhseine's home country, in November 2021 on a humanitarian mission. In a joint press conference the team announced a partnership with the Moroccan-occupied city of Laayoune to open an academy to promote and develop football in the Sahara region.
