= Flower City Union =

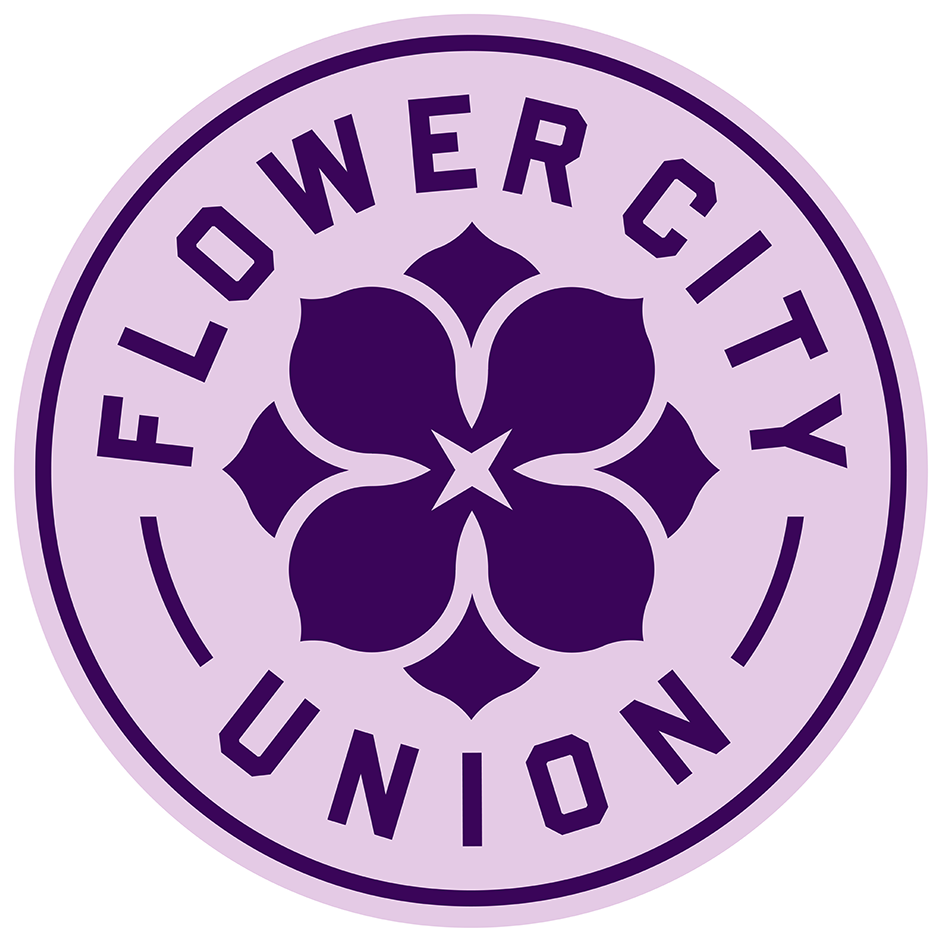
- Founded: 2020; 6 years ago
- Stadium: Rochester Community Sports Complex Stadium
- Capacity: 13,768
- Owner: Jimmy Paola
- General Manager: Brennan Shanahan
- Head Coach: Jordan Sullivan
- League: National Premier Soccer League
- Website: flowercityunion.com
| Home colours | Away colours |

Flower City Union is an American pre-professional soccer team based in Rochester, New York, United States, that currently plays in the National Premier Soccer League. Its home stadium was Rochester Community Sports Complex Stadium. Flower City Union won their first championship in 2023, winning the 2023 National Independent Soccer Association Championship.

== History ==
=== Founding ===
In 2017, the long-time professional soccer team in Rochester, the USL's Rochester Rhinos, announced that they were going on hiatus as of the 2018 season. The departure of the Rhinos left Rochester without a professional soccer team for the first time since 1995 and left the team's stadium, Rochester Community Sports Complex Stadium, without a tenant in 2019. In 2020, an ownership group headed by David Weaver, the CEO and founder of Rochester-based Aphex BioCleanse Systems Inc. and a former Kodak optical engineer, submitted an application for a NISA team in Rochester. In June 2021, an announcement at the final Rochester Lancers game announced that FCU would take over the men's and women's Lancers and Lady Lancers teams. Behind the scenes, there was a big push from rival RNYFC to take over the Lancers. Promised shares in Weaver's company Aphex BioCleanse were the deciding factor in Salvatore "Soccer Sam" Fantauzzo choosing the Flower City Union brand. When this came to light internally in Aphex BioCleanse, Weaver was dismissed from the company, and his ownership in Flower City Union was quietly removed. Jimmy Paola was brought in to ensure the team had the ownership requirements for NISA to compete.

Mark Washo, a former Chief Business Officer with the Rhinos, was appointed as Managing Director and Chief Commercial Officer and the group later announced a partnership with St. John Fisher College’s Sport Management Department. In December 2020, NISA approved the group's expansion application, and soon after the team was unveiled as Flower City Union, a nod to Rochester's nickname as the "Flower City". On April 14, 2021, the team logo and colors were introduced, the primary color being lilac purple in honor of Rochester's signature festival.

=== NISA Champions ===
The club began play in 2022, and finished last in the nine-team league. For 2023 they merged with the Syracuse Pulse to form a single club that would split home matches between Rochester (as Flower City Union) and Auburn (as Salt City Union).

During the 2023 season, Flower City finished in 6th place during the regular season, making the playoffs as the last seed. Flower City defeated the top three seeds, on the road, to win the 2023 NISA Championship.

=== Departure from NISA ===
Flower City Union announced its departure from NISA in a statement on February 15, 2024, promising an announcement on the club's future to come the following week. NISA responded with a press release saying "goodbye to our reigning champions".

Club general manager Casey Catlin cited the cost of traveling cross-country for league matches as the primary reason for Flower City's departure from NISA.

=== New league ===
On February 20, 2024 the team were announced as members of the semi-professional National Premier Soccer League. As a regional league, the clubs play fewer matches with shorter travel distances.

The Salt City identity has been abandoned with the move to the NPSL, and Flower City Union no longer plays any of its home games in Auburn.

== Seasons ==
| Season | League | | | | | | | | | | | Position | | Playoffs | USOC | Continental | | Average attendance | Top goalscorer(s) | |
| Season | Div | League | Pld | W | L | D | GF | GA | GD | Pts | PPG | Conf. | Overall | Playoffs | USOC | Continental | | Average attendance | Name | Goals |
|---|---|---|---|---|---|---|---|---|---|---|---|---|---|---|---|---|---|---|---|---|
| 2022 | 3 | NISA | 23 | 2 | 18 | 3 | 13 | 57 | −44 | 9 | 0.39 | 4th | 8th | DNQ | R3 | DNQ | — | 492 | (United States) Lukas Fernandez | 5 |
| 2023 | 3 | NISA | 24 | 8 | 13 | 3 | 30 | 34 | −4 | 27 | 1.13 | N/A | 6th | Champion | R3 | DNQ | — | 635 (Note: Only accounts for regular season matches played at Rochester Community Sports Complex Stadium) | (Senegal) Alioune Diakhate | 10 |
| 2024 | 4 | NPSL | 10 | 5 | 4 | 1 | 26 | 24 | 2 | 16 | 1.6 | 4th | N/A | Conference semifinal | DNQ | DNQ | — | 452 | Rodrigo Gomes de Almeida | 10 |
| 2025 | 4 | NPSL | 10 | 8 | 1 | 1 | 31 | 8 | 23 | 25 | 2.5 | 1st | 6th | Regional Finals | DNQ | DNQ | — | — | Rodrigo Gomes de Almeida | — |
| 2026 | 4 | NPSL | 12 | 4 | 3 | 5 | 20 | 15 | 5 | 15 | 1.25 | 4th | 35th | Conference Finals | R1 | DNQ | — | — | – | — |
| Total | — | — | 79 | 27 | 39 | 13 | 120 | 138 | -18 | 92 | 1.16 | — | — | — | — | — | — | — | — | — |

== Honors ==
National Independent Soccer Association

- NISA National Championship
  - Champion (1): 2023
