= San Diego 1904 FC =

- Full name: San Diego 1904 Football Club
- Nickname: 1904 FC
- Founded: 2016
- Dissolved: 2021; 5 years ago
- Stadium: Chula Vista Elite; Athlete Training Center; Chula Vista, California
- Capacity: 3,700
- League: National Independent Soccer Association
- Fall 2021: 10th place
- Website: 1904fc.com
Home colors	Away colors

San Diego 1904 FC was an American professional soccer team based in San Diego, California. In December 2021, the team was absorbed by Albion San Diego, which effectively took over 1904's membership in the National Independent Soccer Association (NISA).

== History ==
The name 1904 was suggested by a fan, and refers to S and D, the nineteenth and fourth letters of the alphabet (also, the letters S and D resemble the numbers 9 and 0 in the club logo). Commenters on social media pointed out that the number could also be seen as a reference to a joke in the film Anchorman: The Legend of Ron Burgundy (in which Burgundy falsely asserts that San Diego was "discovered by the Germans in 1904"), leading journalists to suggest that reference may have been intentional.

The club's founders include soccer players Demba Ba and Eden Hazard. The club intended to build a soccer stadium in Oceanside, approximately 40 miles (64 km) north of downtown San Diego.

The team was originally announced to make its debut in the North American Soccer League in 2018. However, due to the cancellation of the 2018 NASL season, the expansion team withdrew from the NASL and attempted to reach an agreement to join the United Soccer League in 2019. On June 7, 2018, it was revealed that 1904 FC's exclusive negotiating window had elapsed without agreement in place to join USL. On September 6, 2018, the National Independent Soccer Association (NISA), a planned Division III league, confirmed that San Diego 1904 FC was the league's first member club. NISA has applied to the United States Soccer Federation (U.S. Soccer) for sanctioning as a Division III league to start play in 2019. The club played at 70,561-seat capacity SDCCU Stadium for the Fall 2019 NISA season.

On August 29, 2019, Alexandre Gontran was announced as the club's first head coach.

In the spring, the team announced it would move to Lincoln High School within the city.

On July 28, 2020, the team announced it would go on hiatus for the Fall 2020 NISA season due to the COVID-19 pandemic and un-sustainability that would come from playing behind closed doors. On September 2, NISA and the team both confirmed it would be returning for the Spring 2021 season. This continued into 2021 when the team was announced as one of nine participating teams in both the Spring season and NISA Legends Cup tournament. On July 7, it was announced that 1904 FC had withdrawn from the 2021 NISA Independent Cup, with the league citing that the club had opted for a "different route to prepare for the fall season". In December 2021, the team announced it would be taken over by Albion San Diego.

== Stadiums ==
- SDCCU Stadium; San Diego, California (2019)
- Lincoln High School; San Diego, California (2020)
- Chula Vista Elite Athlete Training Center; Chula Vista, California (2021)

== Year-by-year ==
Season	League	Div.	Pos.	Pl.	W	D	L	GS	GA	Pts.	Playoffs	U.S. Open Cup	Top goalscorer		Manager
Season	League	Div.	Pos.	Pl.	W	D	L	GS	GA	Pts.	Playoffs	U.S. Open Cup	Name	League	Manager
2019–20	NISA	Fall - West Coast (Note: The Fall 2019 NISA season had eight teams split into two separate conferences, East Coast and West Coast)	3rd	6	2	0	4	9	15	6	Did not qualify	Second round	(United States) Lorenzo Ramirez Jr.	3	(France) Alexandre Gontran
2019–20	NISA	Spring (Note: Spring season cancelled before completion)	5th	2	0	2	0	2	2	2	Cancelled	Second round	(United States) Joseph Patrick Pérez (United States) Ozzie Ramos	1	(France) Alexandre Gontran
2020–21	NISA	Fall	Did not play												
2020–21	NISA	Spring	7th	8	2	1	5	8	17	7	Did not qualify	Cancelled	(United States) Cesar Romero Jr	2	(Scotland) Scott Morrison
2021	NISA	Fall	10th	18	2	3	13	17	37	9	Cancelled	Cancelled	(United States) Edward Benito	3	(Scotland) Scott Morrison
