= Albion San Diego =

Soccer club in San Diego, California

- Nicknames: Albion; Pros (former)
- Founded: 2015; 11 years ago
- Stadium: Canyon Crest Stadium; San Diego, California
- Capacity: 2,400
- Chairman: Demba Ba
- League: National Independent Soccer Association
- Website: albionsandiego.com
Home colors	Away colors

Albion San Diego is an American professional soccer team based in San Diego, California, that is an inactive member of the National Independent Soccer Association (NISA). Albion San Diego began play in the 2016 season. The team plays their home games at Canyon Crest Academy.

== History ==
=== Amateur founding ===
The club was formed in 2015 as the Albion SC Pros, and played its first competitive season as a franchise in 2016, in the National Premier Soccer League. The team's name changed to ASC San Diego for the 2018 season.

=== 2022: Going professional ===
On December 15, 2021, the club announced a merger with San Diego 1904 FC of NISA, after that club lost a major source of financing. The new club was to take its name from West Bromwich Albion, a professional soccer club in England, and compete in NISA as Albion San Diego, starting with the 2022 season.

=== Hiatus ===
Following two seasons in NISA, Albion announced that it would be taking a hiatus from competitive play starting with the 2024 season.

== Year-by-year ==
Year	Division	League	Record	Regular season	Playoffs	US Open Cup
2016	4	NPSL	8–0–4	1st, West-Southwest	Regional Final	Ineligible
2017	4	NPSL	11–4–1	4th, West-Southwest	Regional First Round	1st Round
2018	4	NPSL	9–2–1	1st, West-Southwest	Regional Quarterfinals	Ineligible
2019	4	NPSL	12–5–1	3rd, West-Southwest	National Semifinal	Ineligible
2020	4	NPSL	Season canceled due to COVID-19 pandemic			
2021	4	NPSL	2–5–3	4th, West-Southwest	did not qualify	Cancelled
2022	3	NISA	9–6–5	4th	Runner-up	2nd Round
2023	3	NISA	11–8–5	4th	Semi Final	2nd Round
