= 2022 Union Omaha season =

Union Omaha
2022 season
- Owner: Gary Green
- Head coach: Jay Mims
- Stadium: Werner Park
- USL League One: 5th place
- USL1 Playoffs: Quarterfinals
- U.S. Open Cup: Quarterfinals
- Top goalscorer: League: Noe Meza (7 goals); All: Noe Meza (9 goals)
- Highest home attendance: 5,167 vs. CHA (7/30)
- Lowest home attendance: 2,236 vs. NC (8/20)
- Average home league attendance: 3,407
- Biggest win: League/All: OMA 3–0 CV (4/23); OMA 4–1 NC (8/20)
- Biggest defeat: League: RIC 3–0 OMA (8/27); TUC 3–0 OMA (9/11); All: SKC 6–0 OMA (6/22, USOC)
Home colors	Away colors

The 2022 Union Omaha season was the third season in the soccer team's history, and their third season in the third division of American soccer, USL League One. Union Omaha played their home games at Werner Park, located in Papillion, Nebraska, United States.

Union Omaha were the defending league champions, after defeating Greenville Triumph SC in the final the previous season. They also competed in the U.S. Open Cup for the first time, defeating two teams from Major League Soccer and reaching the quarterfinals, the farthest a team from USL League One has advanced in the tournament since the formation of the league.

== Transfers ==
=== Transfers in ===
Date	Position	Name	From	Fee/notes	Ref.
February 1, 2022	MF	(United States) Dion Acoff	(Iceland) Grindavík	Free	
February 1, 2022	FW	(United States) Noe Meza	(United States) Seattle University	Free	
February 10, 2022	FW	(United States) Giovanni Montesdeoca	(United States) Loudoun United	Free	
February 18, 2022	MF	(South Sudan) Ryen Jiba	(United States) Salt Lake Community College	Free	
February 18, 2022	FW	(Japan) Hugo Kametani	(United States) Omaha Mavericks	Free	
February 24, 2022	MF	(Jamaica) Chavany Willis	(Jamaica) Arnett Gardens F.C.	Undisclosed	
March 8, 2022	DF	(England) Alex Touche	(United States) New Mexico United	Free	
March 22, 2022	DF	(Ghana) Isaac Bawa	(United States) LA Galaxy II	Free	
March 22, 2022	MF	(United States) Joe Brito	(United States) UNC Charlotte	Free	
March 22, 2022	FW	(England) Alex Bruce	(United States) North Texas SC	Free	
March 22, 2022	DF	(United States) Gabriel Claudio	(United States) UNLV	Free	
April 12, 2022	FW	(Jamaica) Kemal Malcolm	(El Salvador) A.D. Chalatenango	Free	
April 15, 2022	MF	(United States) Eddie Gordon	(United States) Omaha Mavericks	Free	
August 22, 2022	DF	(United States) Shaft Brewer Jr.	(Norway) Fram Larvik	Free	

=== Transfers out ===
Date	Position	No.	Name	To	Fee/notes	Ref.
November 29, 2021	FW	12	(United States) Austin Panchot		Retired	
November 30, 2021	DF	18	(United States) Blake Malone	(United States) Orange County SC	End of Loan	
December 21, 2021	DF	16	(United States) Jake Crull	(United States) FC Tucson	Free	
January 6, 2022	FW	11	(United States) Evan Conway	(United States) San Diego Loyal	Free	
January 17, 2022	FW	9	(Scotland) Greg Hurst	(United States) Phoenix Rising FC	Free	
January 20, 2022	MF	20	(United States) Devin Boyce	(United States) Memphis 901 FC	Free	
January 25, 2022	DF	25	(Democratic Republic of the Congo) Ferrety Sousa	(United States) Sacramento Republic	Free	
January 28, 2022	MF	7	(United States) Ethan Vanacore-Decker	(United States) Northern Colorado Hailstorm	Free	
February 15, 2022	MF	14	(El Salvador) Christian Molina	(United States) Richmond Kickers	Free	
February 15, 2022	MF	5	(Kenya) Tobias Otieno	(United States) South Georgia Tormenta	Free	
March 2, 2022	MF	10	(Brazil) Nicolas Firmino	(United States) Atlanta United 2	Free	
March 2, 2022	DF	3	(Spain) Damià Viader	(United States) Sacramento Republic	Undisclosed	
March 3, 2022	MF	8	(United States) John Murphy	(United States) New York Red Bulls II	Free	

== Roster ==
In December 2021, Union Omaha announced an initial group of five players from last season's roster returning for the 2022 season.

As of October 2, 2022

No.	Position	Nation	Player
2	MF	BIH	Emir Alihodžić
4	DF	ENG	Alex Touche
5	DF	USA	Gabriel Claudio
6	MF	JAM	Chavany Willis
7	FW	USA	Noe Meza
8	MF	USA	Joe Brito
10	FW	JPN	Hugo Kametani
11	FW	JAM	Kemal Malcolm
12	MF	USA	Eddie Gordon
13	DF	USA	Daltyn Knutson
16	FW	ENG	Alex Bruce
17	MF	USA	JP Scearce
19	FW	PUR	Ricardo Rivera
21	DF	GHA	Isaac Bawa
22	MF	USA	Conor Doyle
23	FW	USA	Giovanni Montesdeoca
24	GK	GHA	Rashid Nuhu
26	MF	USA	Dion Acoff
27	MF	SSD	Ryen Jiba
28	DF	USA	Shaft Brewer
30	MF	USA	Yoskar Galván-Mercado
33	GK	USA	Kevin Piedrahita

== Competitions ==
=== Exhibitions ===
February 26, 2022 Preseason 1	San Diego Loyal	2–0	Union Omaha	San Diego, California

March 1, 2022 Preseason 2	University of San Diego	0–1	Union Omaha

March 13, 2022 Preseason 3	Sporting Kansas City II	1–1	Union Omaha	Kansas City, Missouri
2:00 PM CST				Stadium: Swope Soccer Village

March 18, 2022 Preseason 4	Union Omaha	1–2	St. Louis City SC 2	Kansas City, Missouri
				Stadium: Swope Soccer Village

=== USL League One ===
==== Standings ====
Pos	Team	Pld	W	L	T	GF	GA	GD	Pts	Qualification
3	Tormenta FC (C)	30	12	9	9	42	40	+2	45	Qualification for the play-offs
4	Chattanooga Red Wolves SC	30	12	11	7	52	39	+13	43	Qualification for the play-offs
5	Union Omaha	30	10	7	13	34	33	+1	43	Qualification for the play-offs
6	Charlotte Independence	30	12	12	6	48	48	0	42	Qualification for the play-offs
7	Northern Colorado Hailstorm FC	30	11	10	9	42	38	+4	42	

Source: USL League One
Rules for classification: 1) points; 2) total wins; 3) total goal differential; 4) total goals scored; 5) points earned against top four Conference finishers; 6) disciplinary points; 7) drawing of lots.
(C) Champions

==== Results summary ====
Overall								Home						Away					
Pld	W	D	L	GF	GA	GD	Pts	W	D	L	GF	GA	GD	W	D	L	GF	GA	GD
30	10	13	7	34	32	+2	43	6	6	3	20	14	+6	4	7	4	14	18	−4

Source: USL League One

==== Results by round ====
Round	1	2	3	4	5	6	7	8	9	10	11	12	13	14	15	16	17	18	19	20	21	22	23	24	25	26	27	28	29	30
Stadium	A	A	H	A	A	H	A	A	H	A	H	A	H	A	A	H	A	H	H	H	A	H	H	A	H	H	A	A	H	H
Result	D	D	W	L	D	D	W	W	L	W	D	D	W	D	D	D	W	D	W	W	L	W	W	L	L	D	L	D	D	L
Position	7	7	2	6	8	10	8	6	7	7	6	6	4	7	7	6	5	5	5	3	3	2	2	3	3	3	2	3	4	5

Source: USL League One
A = Away; H = Home; W = Win; D = Draw; L = Loss

==== Match results ====
April 9, 2022 1	Forward Madison	2–2	Union Omaha	Madison, Wisconsin
7:00 PM CDT	Bartman (yellow card) 26'; Wheeler-Omiunu (yellow card) 30'; Jepson 36'; Leonard (yellow card) 38'; Maldonado (yellow card) 57'; Streng 70'	Report	Kametani 15'; Scearce 45+3'; Doyle (yellow card) 47'; Brito (yellow card) 67'	Stadium: Breese Stevens Field; Referee: Esad Omanovic

April 16, 2022 2	South Georgia Tormenta	0–0	Union Omaha	Statesboro, Georgia
6:30 PM CDT	Billhardt (yellow card) 51'; Nembhard (yellow card) 66'; Roberts (yellow card) 67'; Phelps (red card) 73'	Report	Knutson (yellow card) 15'; Scearce (yellow card) 20'; Malcolm (yellow card) 80'	Stadium: Eagle Field; Attendance: 978; Referee: Izlen Peksenar

April 23, 2022 3	Union Omaha	3–0	Fuego FC	Papillion, Nebraska
6:00 PM CDT	Kametani 48'; Malcolm 90'; Scearce 90+4' (pen.)	Report	S. Chavez (yellow card) 15' (yellow-red card) 90+3'; Ramos (yellow card) 17'; Smith (yellow card) 63'; Casillas (yellow card) 90+4'	Stadium: Werner Park; Attendance: 3,375; Referee: Greg Dopka

April 30, 2022 4	Charlotte Independence	2–1	Union Omaha	Charlotte, North Carolina
6:00 PM CDT	Ciss (yellow card) 38'; Luquetta 83'; Páez (yellow card) 86'; Bennett 90+4'	Report	Meza 65'	Stadium: American Legion Memorial Stadium; Attendance: 2,902; Referee: John Matto

May 14, 2022 5	Richmond Kickers	1–1	Union Omaha	Richmond, Virginia
5:30 PM CDT	Terzaghi (yellow card) 37'; Gordon 41'; Ritchie (yellow card) 45+6'; Barnathan (yellow card) 59'; Morán (yellow card) 69'; Payne (yellow card) 86'	Report	Meza 26'; Touche (yellow card) 62'; Bawa (yellow card) 75'	Stadium: City Stadium; Attendance: 2,579; Referee: Ben Meyer

May 25, 2022 -	Union Omaha	P–P	Charlotte Independence	Papillion, Nebraska
7:00 PM CDT				Stadium: Werner Park
Note: Postponed due to U.S. Open Cup scheduling conflict

May 28, 2022 6	Union Omaha	0–0	Hailstorm FC	Papillion, Nebraska
7:00 PM CDT	Claudio (yellow card) 53'	Report	Evans (yellow card) 50'; Hernández (yellow card) 57'; Scally (yellow card) 76'; Peñaranda (yellow card) 88'; Parra (yellow card) 90+4'	Stadium: Werner Park; Attendance: 3,432; Referee: Lorenzo Hernandez

June 4, 2022 7	Chattanooga Red Wolves	0–1	Union Omaha	East Ridge, Tennessee
6:30 PM CDT	Ortiz (yellow card) 17'; Lombardi (yellow card) 22'; Carrera (yellow card) 90+4'	Report	Brito 2', (yellow card) 64'; Malcolm (yellow card) 45'; Jiba (yellow card) 49'; Nuhu (yellow card) 66'; Alihodžić (yellow card) 70'; Touche (yellow card) 87'	Stadium: CHI Memorial Stadium; Attendance: 2,235; Referee: Joshua Belk

June 11, 2022 8	FC Tucson	1–2	Union Omaha	Tucson, Arizona
9:00 PM CDT	Pérez (yellow card) 69'; Doyle 73' (o.g.); Fahling (yellow card) 90+2'	Report	Meza 42'; Claudio (yellow card) 51' (yellow-red card) 63'; Malcolm 57'	Stadium: Kino Sports Complex; Attendance: 1,355; Referee: Dejan Susak

June 18, 2022 9	Union Omaha	0–2	Greenville Triumph	Papillion, Nebraska
7:00 PM CDT	Malcolm (yellow card) 24'; Alihožić (yellow card) 86'	Report	Pilato (yellow card) 21'; Labovitz (yellow card) 41' (goal) 44'; Keegan 56'; Fenton (yellow card) 81'; Smart (yellow card) 86'; Brown (yellow card) 90+4'	Stadium: Werner Park; Attendance: 3,662; Referee: Luis Arroyo

June 25, 2022 10	South Georgia Tormenta	2–3	Union Omaha	Statesboro, Georgia
6:30 PM CDT	Phelps (yellow card) 5' (yellow-red card) 77'; Billhardt 17'; Adeniyi (yellow card) 45+4'; Dengler (yellow card) 54'; Bawa 90+3' (o.g.)	Report	Scearce 23', (yellow card) 42', (goal) 55' (pen.); Brito 74'; Galvan (yellow card) 90'; Piedrahita (yellow card) 90+3'	Stadium: Optim Health System Field; Attendance: 627; Referee: Josiah Parke

July 1, 2022 11	Union Omaha	0–0	Charlotte Independence	Papillion, Nebraska
7:00 PM CDT	Galvan (yellow card) 90'	Report	Ciss (yellow card) 36'; Amaya (yellow card) 44'; Shevtsov (yellow card) 50'; Dutey (yellow card) 69'; Barber (red card) 83'; Dimick (yellow card) 90+3'	Stadium: Werner Park; Attendance: 3,026; Referee: Velimir Stefanovic

July 9, 2022 12	North Carolina FC	1–1	Union Omaha	Cary, North Carolina
6:00 PM CDT	Servania (yellow card) 32', (goal) 39'; Martinez (yellow card) 83'; Sommersall (yellow card) 88'	Report	Bawa (yellow card) 35'; Meza 63'	Stadium: WakeMed Soccer Park; Attendance: 1,279; Referee: Izlen Peksenar

July 16, 2022 13	Union Omaha	2–1	FC Tucson	Papillion, Nebraska
7:00 PM CDT	Kametani 14'; Scearce (yellow card) 23' (yellow-red card) 30'; Touche (yellow card) 27'; Knutson (yellow card) 54'; Jiba (yellow card) 55'; Nuhu (yellow card) 55'; Bawa (yellow card) 90'; Bruce 90+1'	Report	Fox (yellow card) 25'; Pérez (yellow card) 53' (yellow-red card) 61'; Garcia (yellow card) 54'; Crull 68'; Shibata (yellow card) 84'	Stadium: Werner Park; Attendance: 4,004; Referee: Laura Chambers

July 23, 2022 14	Greenville Triumph	0–0	Union Omaha	Greenville, South Carolina
6:00 PM CDT	Smart (yellow card) 52'; Polak (yellow card) 55'	Report	Doyle (yellow card) 10'; Jiba (yellow card) 32'; Bruce (yellow card) 80'; Piedrahita (yellow card) 88'; Claudio (yellow card) 90+3'	Stadium: Legacy Early College Field; Referee: Gerald Flores

July 26, 2022 15	Forward Madison	0–0	Union Omaha	Madison, Wisconsin
7:00 PM CDT	Rad (yellow card) 12'; Torres (yellow card) 36'; Wheeler-Omiunu (yellow card) 75'; Maldonado (yellow card) 80'	Report	Bawa (yellow card) 35'; Meza (yellow card) 37'; Brito (yellow card) 43'; Touche (yellow card) 64'; Gil (yellow card) 69'	Stadium: Breese Stevens Field; Attendance: 4,695; Referee: Rebeca Pagan

July 30, 2022 16	Union Omaha	1–1	Chattanooga Red Wolves	Papillion, Nebraska
7:00 PM CDT	Willis 90+3'	Report	Hernández 20' (yellow card) 50' (yellow-red card) 66'; Lombardi (yellow card) 67'	Stadium: Werner Park; Attendance: 5,167; Referee: Cristian Campo Hernández

August 6, 2022 17	Fuego FC	0–1	Union Omaha	Fresno, California
9:30 PM CDT	Bijev (penalty missed) 16'; Partida (yellow card) 29'; Chaney (yellow card) 78'; S. Chavez (yellow card) 90+7'	Report	Nuhu (yellow card) 16'; Scearce 23'; Brito (yellow card) 40'	Stadium: Fresno State Soccer and Lacrosse Stadium; Attendance: 1,075; Referee: Joseph Salinas

August 13, 2022 18	Union Omaha	1–1	Hailstorm FC	Papillion, Nebraska
7:00 PM CDT	Meza 12'; Gordon (yellow card) 90+4'	Report	Robles (yellow card) 37'; Dietrich (yellow card) 42'; Parra (yellow card) 75', (goal) 79'	Stadium: Werner Park; Attendance: 4,312; Referee: DeShun Beard

August 17, 2022 19	Union Omaha	2–1	Charlotte Independence	Papillion, Nebraska
7:00 PM CDT	Willis (yellow card) 32', (goal) 67'; Bruce (yellow card) 45+2'; Meza 57'	Report	Ibarra (yellow card) 29'; Ciss (yellow card) 43'; Bennett 51' (pen.); Barber (yellow card) 78'; Dutey (yellow card) 90+10'	Stadium: Werner Park; Attendance: 2,258; Referee: Esad Omanovic

August 20, 2022 20	Union Omaha	4–1	North Carolina FC	Papillion, Nebraska
7:00 PM CDT	Piedrahita 1'; Hertzog 6'; Meza 17', 58'; Touche (yellow card) 29'; Gordon (yellow card) 52'; Galván (yellow card) 90+2'	Report	Blanco (red card) 49'; Fernandes (yellow card) 55'; Fischer (yellow card) 68' (yellow-red card) 68'; McLaughlin 90+1'	Stadium: Werner Park; Attendance: 2,236; Referee: Chris Ruska

August 27, 2022 21	Richmond Kickers	3–0	Union Omaha	Richmond, Virginia
5:30 PM CDT	Bolanos 20'; Payne (yellow card) 45+12'; Vanacore-Decker (yellow card) 66'; Terzaghi 70', 76'	Report	Jiba (yellow card) 69'; Doyle (yellow card) 72'; Meza (yellow card) 72'	Stadium: City Stadium; Attendance: 4,886; Referee: Matthew Franz

August 31, 2022 22	Union Omaha	1–0	Forward Madison	Papillion, Nebraska
7:00 PM CDT	Alihodžić (red card) 50'; Hertzog 77'; Doyle (yellow card) 90'	Report	Mbacke Thiam (yellow card) 45+3'; R. Smith (yellow card) 89'	Stadium: Werner Park; Referee: Velimir Stefanovic

September 3, 2022 23	Union Omaha	2–1	Chattanooga Red Wolves	Papillion, Nebraska
7:00 PM CDT	Brito (yellow card) 35'; Hertzog (red card) 60'; Gil 88'; Acoff 90+1'	Report	Espinoza 28'; Villalobos (yellow card) 64'; Tejera (yellow card) 89'	Stadium: Werner Park; Attendance: 2,745; Referee: Joshua Encarnación

September 11, 2022 24	FC Tucson	3–0	Union Omaha	Tucson, Arizona
9:00 PM CDT	Weir 1', (yellow card) 6'; Fahling (yellow card) 58'; Bedoya 60'; Toia 76'	Report	Rivera (yellow card) 43'	Stadium: Kino Sports Complex; Referee: Lorenzo Hernandez

September 14, 2022 25	Union Omaha	2–3	Richmond Kickers	Papillion, Nebraska
7:00 PM CDT	Scearce 49' (pen.), 81'; Gil (yellow card) 77'; Touche (yellow card) 90+5'; Doyle (yellow card) 90+7'	Report	Vanacore-Decker 78'; Gordon (yellow card) 80'; Payne 89'; Vinyals 90+7' (pen.)	Stadium: Werner Park; Attendance: 2,610; Referee: Gerald Flores

September 17, 2022 26	Union Omaha	1–1	Greenville Triumph	Papillion, Nebraska
7:00 PM CDT	Scearce (yellow card) 48'; Hertzog 76' (pen.); Nuhu (yellow card) 90+3'	Report	Fenton (yellow card) 9' (yellow-red card) 80'; Franke (yellow card) 40'; Coutinho (yellow card) 45'; Waldeck (yellow card) 69'; Fricke (yellow card) 75' (yellow-red card) 84'; Walker 90+3' (pen.)	Stadium: Werner Park; Attendance: 3,264; Referee: Abdou Ndiaye

September 21, 2022 27	Hailstorm FC	2–1	Union Omaha	Windsor, Colorado
8:00 PM CDT	Evans 24', 84'; Dietrich (yellow card) 42'; Parra (yellow card) 57'; Olsen (yellow card) 72'	Report	Malcolm (yellow card) 40'; Hertzog (yellow card) 41'; Scearce (yellow card) 59'; Meza 75' (pen.)	Stadium: Future Legends Complex; Referee: Corbyn May

October 1, 2022 28	North Carolina FC	1–1	Union Omaha	Cary, North Carolina
6:00 PM CDT	Anderson 82'	Report	Touche (yellow card) 6'; Hertzog 25'; Gil (yellow card) 66'; Scearce (yellow card) 81'; Brewer (yellow card) 85'	Stadium: WakeMed Soccer Park; Attendance: 1,608; Referee: John Matto

October 8, 2022 29	Union Omaha	1–1	South Georgia Tormenta	Papillion, Nebraska
7:00 PM CDT	Doyle 24'; Scearce (yellow card) 50'; Knutson (yellow card) 75'	Report	Green (red card) 22'; Sterling 52' (pen.)	Stadium: Werner Park; Attendance: 4,437; Referee: Greg Dopka

October 15, 2022 30	Union Omaha	0–2	Fuego FC	Papillion, Nebraska
4:00 PM CDT	Rivera (yellow card) 23'	Report	Casillas (yellow card) 32'; S. Chavez (yellow card) 40'; Villarreal (yellow card) 45+2'; Dieye 61', (yellow card) 74'; Chaney (yellow card) 78', (goal) 90+10'; Gillingham (yellow card) 79'	Stadium: Werner Park; Attendance: 3,174; Referee: Ricardo Fierro

==== USL League One playoffs ====
October 22, 2022 Quarter-finals	Chattanooga Red Wolves SC	1–0 (a.e.t.)	Union Omaha	East Ridge, Tennessee
7:30 PM EDT	Texeira (yellow card) 49'; Ortiz (yellow card) 57'; Benton (yellow card) 93'; Mentzingen 101'; Gutiérrez (yellow card) 120+4'	Report	Gil (yellow card) 10'; Scearce (yellow card) 78'; Claudio (yellow card) 113'	Stadium: CHI Memorial Stadium; Attendance: 2,416; Referee: Matthew Corrigan

=== U.S.Open Cup ===
April 5, 2022 Second round	Union Omaha (USL1) (Nebraska)	2–1	(Iowa) Des Moines Menace (USL2)	Omaha, NE
7:00 CDT	Scearce 19'; Touche (yellow card) 45+2'; Bertini 81' (o.g.)	Report	Hertzog 14'; Salvadego (yellow card) 90'; Garcia (yellow card) 90+2'	Stadium: Morrison Stadium

April 19, 2022 Third round	Chicago Fire (MLS) (Illinois)	2–2 (a.e.t.) (4–5 p)	(Nebraska) Union Omaha (USL1)	Chicago, IL
7:00 CDT	Oregel (yellow card) 7'; Durán (yellow card) 42'; Czichos 53' (pen.), 115' (pen.); Espinoza (yellow card) 97'; Casas (yellow card) 110'	Report	Rivera (yellow card) 55'; Claudio (yellow card) 60'; Meza 68'; Alihodžić (yellow card) 77'; Touche 120+2'	Stadium: Soldier Field; Referee: Calin Radosav
	Penalties
	Przybyłko (penalty missed); Czichos (penalty scored); Espinoza (penalty scored); Ivanov (penalty scored); Bezerra (penalty scored); Navarro (penalty missed)		Kametani (penalty scored); Alihodžić (penalty scored); Meza (penalty missed); Knutson (penalty scored); Montesdeoca (penalty scored); Acoff (penalty scored)

May 11, 2022 Round of 32	Union Omaha (USL1) (Nebraska)	2–0	Northern Colorado Hailstorm FC (USL1)	Omaha, Nebraska
7:00 CDT	Bawa (yellow card) 45'; Meza 46'; Doyle 58'; Rivera (yellow card) 83'	Report	Desdunes (yellow card) 1'; Lukic (yellow card) 36'	Stadium: Al F. Caniglia Field; Attendance: 1,931; Referee: Esad Omanovic

May 25, 2022 Round of 16	Minnesota United FC (MLS) (Minnesota)	1–2	(Nebraska) Union Omaha (USL1)	St. Paul, Minnesota
7:00 CDT	Hunou 6'; Hlongwane (yellow card) 55'	Report	Kametani 45+1'; Brito 51'	Stadium: Allianz Field; Referee: Elton García

June 22, 2022 Quarterfinal	Sporting Kansas City (MLS)	6–0	(Nebraska) Union Omaha (USL1)	Kansas City, Kansas
7:30 CDT	Sallói 10', 53'; Ford 37'; Shelton 56'; Hernández 66', 81'	Report	Bawa (yellow card) 71'	Stadium: Children's Mercy Park; Attendance: 18,552; Referee: Brandon Stevis

== Statistics ==
=== Appearances and goals ===
Numbers after plus–sign (+) denote appearances as a substitute.

No.	Pos	Nat	Player	Total		USL-1		U.S. Open Cup	
No.	Pos	Nat	Player	Apps	Goals	Apps	Goals	Apps	Goals
2	DF	(Bosnia and Herzegovina) BIH	Emir Alihodžić	25	0	12+8	0	4+1	0
4	DF	(England) ENG	Alex Touche	29	1	22+3	0	2+2	1
5	DF	(United States) USA	Gabriel Claudio	26	0	10+12	0	3+1	0
6	MF	(Jamaica) JAM	Chavany Willis	16	2	5+8	2	1+2	0
7	FW	(United States) USA	Noe Meza	34	11	25+4	9	3+2	2
8	MF	(United States) USA	Joe Brito	34	3	26+3	2	5+0	1
9	FW	(United States) USA	Corey Hertzog	13	4	10+3	4	0+0	0
10	FW	(Japan) JPN	Hugo Kametani	28	4	16+7	3	4+1	1
11	FW	(Jamaica) JAM	Kemal Malcolm	22	2	11+7	2	4+0	0
12	MF	(United States) USA	Eddie Gordon	21	0	7+10	0	0+4	0
13	DF	(United States) USA	Daltyn Knutson	35	0	30+0	0	5+0	0
16	FW	(England) ENG	Alex Bruce	20	1	2+14	1	1+3	0
17	MF	(United States) USA	JP Scearce	30	8	24+2	7	4+0	1
19	FW	(Puerto Rico) PUR	Ricardo Rivera	17	0	3+10	0	2+2	0
20	MF	(United States) USA	Luis Gil	17	1	12+5	1	0+0	0
21	DF	(Ghana) GHA	Isaac Bawa	16	0	13+1	0	1+1	0
22	MF	(United States) USA	Conor Doyle	35	2	27+3	1	5+0	1
23	FW	(United States) USA	Giovanni Montesdeoca	5	0	1+2	0	0+2	0
24	GK	(Ghana) GHA	Rashid Nuhu	28	0	23+0	0	5+0	0
26	MF	(United States) USA	Dion Acoff	29	1	12+13	1	1+3	0
27	DF	(South Sudan) SSD	Ryen Jiba	33	0	26+2	0	5+0	0
28	MF	(United States) USA	Shaft Brewer Jr.	8	0	4+4	0	0+0	0
30	MF	(United States) USA	Yoskar Galvan-Mercado	10	0	1+8	0	0+1	0
33	GK	(United States) USA	Kevin Piedrahita	8	1	7+1	1	0	0

- Last updated: April 18, 2023
- Source: https://fbref.com/en/squads/8585378e/2022/Union-Omaha-Stats

=== Disciplinary record ===
No.	Pos.	Player	USL1			US Open Cup			Total		
No.	Pos.	Player	Booked	(yellow card) (yellow-red card)	Sent off (straight red)	Booked	(yellow card) (yellow-red card)	Sent off (straight red)	Booked	(yellow card) (yellow-red card)	Sent off (straight red)
2	MF	(Bosnia and Herzegovina) Emir Alihodžić	2	0	0	1	0	0	3	0	0
4	DF	(England) Alex Touche	6	0	0	1	0	0	7	0	0
5	DF	(United States) Gabriel Claudio	4	1	0	1	0	0	5	1	0
6	MF	(Jamaica) Chavany Willis	1	0	0	0	0	0	1	0	0
7	FW	(United States) Noe Meza	1	0	0	0	0	0	1	0	0
8	MF	(United States) Joe Brito	3	0	0	0	0	0	3	0	0
9	FW	(United States) Corey Hertzog	1	0	1	0	0	0	1	0	1
10	FW	(Japan) Hugo Kametani	0	0	0	0	0	0	0	0	0
11	FW	(Jamaica) Kemal Malcolm	4	0	0	0	0	0	4	0	0
12	MF	(United States) Eddie Gordon	1	0	0	0	0	0	1	0	0
13	DF	(United States) Daltyn Knutson	2	0	0	0	0	0	2	0	0
16	FW	(England) Alex Bruce	4	0	0	0	0	0	4	0	0
17	MF	(United States) JP Scearce	5	1	0	0	0	0	5	1	0
19	FW	(Puerto Rico) Ricardo Rivera	1	0	0	2	0	0	3	0	0
20	MF	(United States) Luis Gil	2	0	0	0	0	0	2	0	0
21	DF	(Ghana) Isaac Bawa	2	0	0	1	0	0	3	0	0
22	MF	(United States) Conor Doyle	5	0	0	1	0	0	6	0	0
23	FW	(United States) Giovanni Montesdeoca	0	0	0	0	0	0	0	0	0
24	GK	(Ghana) Rashid Nuhu	3	0	0	0	0	0	3	0	0
26	MF	(United States) Dion Acoff	0	0	0	0	0	0	0	0	0
27	DF	(South Sudan) Ryen Jiba	5	0	0	0	0	0	5	0	0
28	DF	(United States) Shaft Brewer Jr.	1	0	0	0	0	0	1	0	0
30	MF	(United States) Yoskar Galvan-Mercado	3	0	0	0	0	0	3	0	0
33	GK	(United States) Kevin Piedrahita	3	0	0	0	0	0	3	0	0
Total			42	2	0	7	0	0	46	2	0

- Last updated: October 2, 2022
- Source: USL League One

== Awards and honors ==
=== USL League One All League First Team ===
Award	Awardee	Position	Ref
USL League One All League First Team	Rashid Nuhu	GK	
USL League One All League First Team	JP Scearce	FW	

=== USL League One End of Season Awards ===
Award	Awardee	Position	Ref
Goalkeeper of the year	Rashid Nuhu	GK	
