= Alex Touche =

English footballer

Personal information
- Full name: Alexander Touche
- Date of birth: 2 June 1999 (age 27)
- Place of birth: London, England
- Height: 1.91 m (6 ft 3 in)
- Position: Defender

Youth career
- 2009–2017: Rio Rapids SC
- 2015–2017: Colorado Rapids

College career
| Years | Team | Apps | (Gls) |
| 2017–2020 | Penn Quakers | 44 | (8) |

Senior career*
| Years | Team | Apps | (Gls) |
| 2017–2019 | Albuquerque Sol | 23 | (3) |
| 2021 | New Mexico United | 3 | (0) |
| 2022 | Union Omaha | 25 | (0) |
- * Club domestic league appearances and goals as of October 16, 2022

Alexander Touche (born 2 June 1999) is an English professional footballer who plays as a defender.

== Career ==
=== Youth ===
Touche was a four-year letter winner at the Albuquerque Academy, helping the team to New Mexico Activities Association state championships in 2015 and 2016. During his time at the Academy, Touche was named first-team All-State, All-District and All-Metro in 2016, All-state Player of the Year, District Player of the Year, first-team All-State, All-District and All-Metro in 2015, First-team All-State, All-District and District Player of the Year in 2014, and an honorable mention All-State in 2013.

=== College and amateur ===
In 2017, Touche attended the University of Pennsylvania to play college soccer. In three seasons with the Quakers, Touche made 44 appearances and scored 8 goals. The Ivy League season was cancelled in 2020 due to the COVID-19 pandemic. During his three seasons, Touche was named Second-team All-Ivy in 2017, First-team All-Ivy in 2018 and 2019, and third-team United Soccer Coaches, All-Region in Northeast, All-ECAC and the Ivy League Defensive Player of the Year in 2019.

Whilst at college, Touche also played in the USL League Two with Albuquerque Sol, making 23 regular seasons appearances over 3 seasons.

=== Professional ===
On 12 January 2021, Touche signed with USL Championship side New Mexico United. He made his professional debut on 29 May, appearing as an injury-time substitute during a 1–0 loss to Loudoun United.

On 8 March 2022 Union Omaha announced they had signed Touche to play in the 2022 season.

== Personal life ==
Touche was born in London, England, but also lived in Albuquerque, New Mexico. His twin brother, Charles, played college soccer at Cornell University.

== Career statistics ==
As of 30 May 2021

Appearances and goals by club, season and competition
| Club | Season | League | | | National Cup | | League Cup | | Total | |
| Club | Season | Division | Apps | Goals | Apps | Goals | Apps | Goals | Apps | Goals |
|---|---|---|---|---|---|---|---|---|---|---|
| Albuquerque Sol FC | 2017 | USL PDL | 5 | 0 | — | | — | | 5 | 0 |
| Albuquerque Sol FC | 2018 | USL PDL | 9 | 1 | — | | — | | 9 | 1 |
| Albuquerque Sol FC | 2019 | USL League Two | 9 | 2 | — | | — | | 9 | 2 |
| Albuquerque Sol FC | Total | | 23 | 3 | — | | — | | 23 | 3 |
| New Mexico United | 2021 | USL Championship | 3 | 0 | — | | — | | 3 | 0 |
| Career total | | | 26 | 3 | 0 | 0 | 0 | 0 | 26 | 3 |
