= Hugo Kametani =

Japanese footballer

Personal information
- Date of birth: 26 January 1999 (age 27)
- Place of birth: Kashima, Ibaraki, Japan
- Height: 1.78 m (5 ft 10 in)
- Position: Forward

Team information
- Current team: Sha Tin
- Number: 11

College career
Years	Team	Apps	(Gls)
2017–2018	Pima Aztecs	54	(39)
2020–2021	Omaha Mavericks	28	(11)

Senior career*
Years	Team	Apps	(Gls)
2021	Des Moines Menace	0	(0)
2022–2023	Union Omaha	24	(3)
2023–2025	Nagaworld	34	(16)
2025	Hougang United	5	(0)
2026–	Sha Tin	8	(2)
- * Club domestic league appearances and goals as of 21:07, 22 November 2026 (UTC)

Hugo Kametani (born 26 January 1999) is a Japanese professional footballer who currently plays as a forward for Hong Kong Premier League club Sha Tin.

== Career ==
=== Pima Aztecs ===
Kametani began attending Pima Community College in 2017, where he played two seasons for the men's soccer team. In 2018 he scored the game-winning goal in overtime to win Pima their first national championship. He scored 30 goals in his sophomore season, and was named the Junior College Division I men's national player of the year.

=== Omaha Mavericks ===
After his time at Pima Community College, Kametani began attending the University of Nebraska-Omaha. Kametani played two seasons for the men's soccer team, and in 2020 was the Summit League Newcomer of the Year as well as named to the All-Summit First Team. In his two seasons with the Mavericks, Kametani scored 11 goals in 28 games.

=== Union Omaha ===
Kametani stayed in Omaha to begin his professional career, signing with Union Omaha of USL League One in 2022 after participating in an invitational camp. Kametani made his professional debut the following April, starting in Omaha's second round match in the U.S. Open Cup. He scored his first professional goal in his second match, a 2–2 draw against Forward Madison in Omaha's opening match of the 2022 season.

=== Sha Tin ===
On 8 August 2026, Kametani joined Hong Kong Premier League club Sha Tin.

== Career statistics ==
=== Club ===
As of 12 July 2025

Club	Season	League			National cup (Note: Includes U.S. Open Cup and Singapore Cup)		Total	
Club	Season	Division	Apps	Goals	Apps	Goals	Apps	Goals
Des Moines Menace	2021	USL League Two	0	0	0	0	0	0
Union Omaha	2022	USL League One	24	3	5	1	29	4
Nagaworld	2023–24	Cambodian Premier League	5	7	0	0	5	7
Nagaworld	2024–25	Cambodian Premier League	29	9	0	0	29	9
Nagaworld	Total		34	16	0	0	45	16
Hougang United	2025–26	Singapore Premier League	5	0	3	0	8	0
Career total			63	19	8	1	71	20
