= List of New Mexico Activities Association championships =

This list of New Mexico Activities Association championships gives the past US state of New Mexico champions of the New Mexico Activities Association in all sanctioned sports and non-sports.

== Fall sports ==
=== Cross Country ===
| Year | Boys' 1A | Boys' 2A | Boys' 3A | Boys' 4A | Boys' 5A | Girls' 1A | Girls' 2A | Girls' 3A | Girls' 4A | Girls' 5A |
|---|---|---|---|---|---|---|---|---|---|---|
| 2026 | Mesa Vista | Pecos | Navajo Prep | St. Pius X | Cleveland | Penasco | Oak Grove Classical | Santa Fe Prep | Los Alamos | Eldorado |
| Year | Boys' A-AA | Boys' AAA | Boys' AAAA | Boys' AAAAA | Boys' AAAAAA | Girls' A-AA | Girls' AAA | Girls' AAAA | Girls' AAAAA | Girls' AAAAAA |
| 2025 | Pecos | Santa Fe Indian School | Albuquerque Academy | Cleveland | | Oak Grove Classical | Santa Fe Prep | Los Alamos | Eldorado | |
| 2024 | Pecos | Navajo Prep | Albuquerque Academy | Rio Rancho | | McCurdy | Santa Fe Prep | Albuquerque Academy | Eldorado | |
| 2023 | Oak Grove | Zuni | Los Alamos | Rio Rancho | | ATC | Santa Fe Prep | Albuquerque Academy | Rio Rancho | |
| 2022 | Pecos | Zuni | Los Alamos | Rio Rancho | | Penasco | Santa Fe Indian | Los Alamos | Cleveland | |
| 2021 | Pecos | Zuni | Los Alamos | Volcano Vista | | Penasco | Cottonwood Classical Prep | Los Alamos | Volcano Vista | |
| 2020 | Cloudcroft | Cottonwood Classical Prep | Hope Christian | Cleveland | | Academy for Technology and the Classics (ATC) | Cottonwood Classical Prep | Los Alamos | Rio Rancho | |
| 2019 | Navajo Pine | Zuni | Los Alamos | Cleveland | | Academy for Technology and the Classics (ATC) | Cottonwood Classical Prep | Los Alamos | Eldorado | |
| 2018 | Navajo Pine | Zuni | Los Alamos | Cleveland | | Pecos | Robertson | Albuquerque Academy | Eldorado | |
| 2017 | Navajo Pine | Pecos | Navajo Prep | Albuquerque Academy | Cleveland | Penasco | Zuni | Cottonwood Classical Prep | Albuquerque Academy | Cleveland |
| 2016 | Mesa Vista | Pecos | Navajo Prep | Albuquerque Academy | Hobbs | Penasco | Zuni | Taos | Albuquerque Academy | Rio Rancho |
| 2015 | Mesa Vista | Pecos | Zuni | Albuquerque Academy | Hobbs | Mountainair | Academy for Technology and the Classics (ATC) | Shiprock | Los Alamos | Cleveland |
| 2014 | Navajo Pine | Laguna-Acoma | Zuni | Los Alamos | Rio Rancho | Jemez Valley | Estancia | Taos | Los Alamos | La Cueva |
| 2013 | Zuni | Taos | Los Alamos | Rio Rancho | | East Mountain | Taos | Los Alamos | La Cueva | |
| 2012 | Laguna-Acoma | Pojoaque | Los Alamos | Cleveland | | Navajo Prep | Shiprock | Los Alamos | Eldorado | |
| 2011 | Laguna-Acoma | Pojoaque | Los Alamos | Cleveland | | Bosque School | Wingate | Los Alamos | Cleveland | |
| 2010 | Laguna-Acoma | Santa Fe Indian | Albuquerque Academy | La Cueva | | Bosque School | Wingate | Los Alamos | Eldorado | |
| 2009 | Jemez Valley | Santa Fe Indian | Albuquerque Academy | Cibola | | Bosque School | Zuni | Los Alamos | Eldorado | |
| 2008 | Navajo Pine | St. Michael's | Albuquerque Academy | Cibola | | Navajo Pine | St. Michael's | Albuquerque Academy | Rio Rancho | |
| 2007 | Navajo Pine | Zuni | Los Alamos | Gallup | | Navajo Pine | St. Michael's | Belen | Eldorado | |
| 2006 | Navajo Pine | St. Michael's | Albuquerque Academy | Gallup | | Navajo Pine | St. Michael's | Los Alamos | Eldorado | |
| 2005 | Navajo Pine | Cobre | Albuquerque Academy | Gallup | | Navajo Prep | St. Michael's | Albuquerque Academy | Gallup | |
| 2004 | Zuni | Wingate | Albuquerque Academy | La Cueva | | Navajo Prep | Shiprock | Los Alamos | Gallup | |
| 2003 | Jemez Valley | Pojoaque | Los Alamos | Gallup | | Santa Fe Indian School | Robertson | Los Alamos | Gallup | |
| 2002 | Jemez Valley | Pojoaque | Albuquerque Academy | Gallup | | Zuni | Pojoaque | Los Alamos | Gallup | |
| 2001 | Jemez Valley | Shiprock | Albuquerque Academy | Manzano | | Santa Rosa | Shiprock | Los Alamos | Gallup | |
| 2000 | Zuni | Pojoaque | Albuquerque Academy | Sandia | | Jemez Valley | Pojoaque | Los Alamos | Gallup | |
| 1999 | Pecos | Albuquerque Academy | Gallup | | | Santa Fe Indian School | Kirtland Central | Gallup | | |
| 1998 | Rehoboth | Albuquerque Academy | La Cueva | | | Rehoboth | Pojoaque | Gallup | | |
| 1997 | Laguna-Acoma | Zuni | Eldorado | | | Rehoboth | Los Alamos | Gallup | | |
| 1996 | Rehoboth | Wingate | La Cueva | | | Rehoboth | Los Alamos | Gallup | | |
| 1995 | Santa Fe Indian School | Albuquerque Academy | La Cueva | | | Newcomb | Los Alamos | La Cueva | | |
| 1994 | Laguna-Acoma | Tohatchi | Gallup | | | Santa Fe Indian School | Los Alamos | La Cueva | | |
| 1993 | Laguna-Acoma | Tohatchi | Gallup | | | Crownpoint | Albuquerque Academy | Gallup | | |
| 1992 | Laguna-Acoma | Tohatchi | Gallup | | | Rehoboth | Los Alamos | Espanola Valley | | |
| 1991 | Laguna-Acoma | Zuni | Gallup | | | Rehoboth | Bloomfield | Farmington | | |
| 1990 | Laguna-Acoma | Tucumcari | Gallup | | | Newcomb | Taos | Gallup | | |
| 1989 | Jemez Valley | Zuni | Gallup | | | Newcomb | Taos | Gallup | | |
| 1988 | Laguna-Acoma | Wingate | Gallup | | | Newcomb | Zuni | Gallup | | |
| 1987 | Santa Fe Indian School | Fort Wingate | Gallup | | | Crownpoint | Zuni | La Cueva | | |
| 1986 | Crownpoint | Wingate | Gallup | | | Crownpoint | Zuni | Santa Fe | | |
| 1985 | Jemez Valley | Zuni | Gallup | | | Laguna-Acoma | Zuni | Santa Fe | | |
| 1984 | Jemez Valley | Zuni | Gallup | | | Laguna-Acoma | Zuni | Santa Fe | | |
| 1983 | Jemez Valley | Grants | Gallup | | | Laguna-Acoma | Zuni | Santa Fe | | |
| 1982 | Jemez Valley | Zuni | Del Norte | | | Laguna-Acoma | Zuni | Los Alamos | | |
| 1981 | Laguna-Acoma | Wingate | Grants | | | Laguna-Acoma | Kirtland Central | Los Alamos | | |
| 1980 | Jemez Valley | Tohatchi | Santa Fe | | | Laguna-Acoma | Santa Fe | | | |
| 1979 | Laguna-Acoma | Tohatchi | Santa Fe | | | Laguna-Acoma | Santa Fe | | | |
| 1978 | Laguna-Acoma | Zuni | Santa Fe | | | | | | | |
| 1977 | Laguna-Acoma | Tohatchi | Grants | | | | | | | |
| 1976 | Laguna-Acoma | Zuni | Santa Fe | | | | | | | |
| 1975 | Laguna-Acoma | Zuni | Santa Fe | | | | | | | |
| 1974 | Laguna-Acoma | Shiprock | Santa Fe | | | | | | | |
| 1973 | Laguna-Acoma | Zuni | Grants | | | | | | | |
| 1972 | Laguna-Acoma | Grants | Las Cruces | | | | | | | |
| 1971 | Laguna-Acoma | Bernalillo | West Mesa | | | | | | | |
| 1970 | Laguna-Acoma | Bernalillo | Manzano | | | | | | | |
| 1969 | Laguna-Acoma | Robertson | Highland | | | | | | | |
| 1968 | Zuni | Bernalillo | Highland | | | | | | | |
| 1967 | Jemez Valley | Wingate | Highland | | | | | | | |
| 1966 | Jemez Valley | Bernalillo | Del Norte | | | | | | | |
| 1965 | Jemez Valley | Silver | Hobbs | | | | | | | |
| 1964 | Jemez Valley | Silver | Valley | | | | | | | |
| 1963 | El Rito | Valley | | | | | | | | |
| 1962 | El Rito | Silver | | | | | | | | |
| 1961 | El Rito | Manzano | | | | | | | | |
| 1960 | Rehoboth | Highland | | | | | | | | |

=== Football ===
| Year | Six man | Eight man | AA | AAA | AAAA | AAAAA | AAAAAA |
|---|---|---|---|---|---|---|---|
| 2025 | Logan (2) | Ft. Sumner (11)/House (3)** | Texico (8) | St Micheal's (7) | Bloomfield (4) | Artesia (33) | V. Sue Cleveland (7) |
| 2024 | Logan (1) | Melrose (15) | Texico (7) | St Micheal's (6) | Bloomfield (3) | Roswell (7) | V. Sue Cleveland (6) |
| 2023 | Roy (10)/Mosquero (1)** | Melrose (14) | Texico (6) | St. Michael's (5) | Lovington (20) | Artesia (32) | La Cueva (6) |
| 2022 | Gateway Christian (8) | Ft. Sumner (10)/House (2)** | Jal (12) | Ruidoso (9) | Bloomfield (2) | Artesia (31) | V. Sue Cleveland (5) |
| 2021 | Gateway Christian (7) | Tatum (7) | Eunice (15) | Robertson (4) | Lovington (19) | Los Lunas (1) | V. Sue Cleveland (4) |
| 2020-21 | Short spring season played but no championships awarded | | | | | | |
| 2019 | Springer (1)/Maxwell (1)** | Melrose (13) | Eunice (14) | Hope Christian | Portales (6) | Roswell (6) | V. Sue Cleveland (3) |
| 2018 | Animas (9) | Tatum (6) | Eunice (13) | Dexter (2) | Taos | Roswell (5) | La Cueva (5) |
| 2017 | Animas (8) | Melrose (12) | Fort Sumner (9)/House (1)** | Eunice (12) | Ruidoso (8) | Artesia (30) | Manzano (1) |
| 2016 | San Jon (1) | Melrose (11) | Lordsburg (2) | Capitan (4) | Portales (5) | St. Pius X (3) | Rio Rancho (2) |
| 2015 | Hondo Valley (3) | Melrose (10) | Escalante (3) | Estancia (3) | Hatch Valley (3) | Artesia (29) | V. Sue Cleveland (2) |
| 2014 | Hondo Valley (2) | Melrose (9) | Escalante (2) | Estancia (2) | Ruidoso (7) | Artesia (28) | Rio Rancho (1) |
| Year | Six man | Eight man | A | AA | AAA | AAAA | AAAAA |
| 2013 | Lake Arthur (8) | Gateway Christian (6) | Hagerman (9) | Clayton | Robertson (3) | Farmington (2) | Las Cruces (7) |
| 2012 | Lake Arthur (7) | Gateway Christian (5) | Escalante | Santa Rosa (8) | St. Michael's (4) | Goddard (8) | Las Cruces (6) |
| 2011 | Lake Arthur (6) | Gateway Christian (4) | Mesilla Valley (1) | Santa Rosa (7) | Lovington (18) | Aztec (2) | V. Sue Cleveland (1) |
| 2010 | Clovis Christian | Melrose (8) | Fort Sumner (8) | Santa Rosa (6) | Lovington (17) | Artesia (27) | Mayfield (8) |
| 2009 | Lake Arthur (5) | Melrose (7) | Hagerman (8) | Tularosa (4) | Lovington (16) | Goddard (7) | La Cueva (4) |
| 2008 | Hondo Valley | Melrose (6) | Fort Sumner (7) | Texico (6) | Portales (4) | Goddard (6) | Las Cruces (5) |
| 2007 | Lake Arthur (4) | Mountainair (5) | Fort Sumner (6) | Santa Rosa (5) | St. Michael's (3) | Artesia (26) | Mayfield (7) |
| 2006 | NM School for the Deaf (1) | Gateway Christian (3) | Fort Sumner (6) | Lordsburg | Robertson (2) | Artesia (25) | Mayfield (6) |
| Year | Six man | A | AA | AAA | AAAA | AAAAA | |
| 2005 | Gateway Christian (2) | Fort Sumner (5) | Hatch Valley (3) | Robertson (1) | Silver (1) | Mayfield (5) | |
| 2004 | Melrose (5) | Texico (5) | Hatch Valley (2) | Lovington (15) | Artesia (24) | La Cueva (3) | |
| 2003 | Tatum (5) | Texico (4) | Hatch Valley | St. Michael's (2) | Artesia (23) | La Cueva (2) | |
| 2002 | Gateway Christian (1) | Fort Sumner (5) | Tucumcari (2) | Ruidoso (6) | Onate (currently Organ Mountain) (1) | Las Cruces (4) | |
| 2001 | Ramah (2) | Fort Sumner (4) | Tularosa (3) | Lovington (14) | Artesia (22) | Clovis (13) | |
| 2000 | Floyd (1) | Hagerman (7) | Eunice (12) | Lovington (13) | Roswell (5) | Las Cruces (3) | |
| Year | Six man | A | AA | AAA | AAAA | | |
| 1999 | Melrose (3) | Jal (11) | Eunice (11) | St. Pius X (2) | Las Cruces (2) | | |
| 1998 | Roy (9) | Fort Sumner (3) | Santa Rosa (4) | Artesia (21) | Mayfield (4) | | |
| 1997 | Roy (8) | Fort Sumner (2) | Dexter | Artesia (20) | Goddard (5) | | |
| 1996 | Melrose (3) | Texico (3) | Santa Rosa (3) | Artesia (19) | Mayfield (3) | | |
| 1995 | Ramah (1) | Fort Sumner (1) | Eunice (10) | Lovington (12) | Mayfield (2) | | |
| 1994 | Melrose (2) | Jal (10) | Eunice (9) | Artesia (18) | Clovis (12) | | |
| 1993 | Lake Arthur (3) | Loving (3) | Santa Rosa (2) | Artesia (17) | Goddard (4) | | |
| 1992 | Mountainair (4) | Loving (2) | Jal (9) | Artesia (16) | La Cueva | | |
| 1991 | Mountainair (3) | Hagerman (6) | Menaul (2) | Goddard (3) | Clovis (11) | | |
| 1990 | Mountainair (2) | Texico (2) | Animas (7) | Lovington (11) | Clovis (10) | | |
| 1989 | Mountainair (1) | Loving (1) | Animas (6) | Goddard (2) | Highland (4) | | |
| 1988 | Lake Arthur (2) | Tatum (4) | Animas (5) | Portales (3) | Roswell (4) | | |
| 1987 | Lake Arthur (1) | Tatum (3) | Animas (4) | Artesia (15) / Lovington (10) * | Roswell (3) | | |
| 1986 | El Paso Jesus Chapel (2)*** | Tatum (2) | Animas (3) | Lovington (9) | Highland (3) | | |
| 1985 | El Paso Jesus Chapel*** | Reserve (4) | Animas (2) | Ruidoso (4) | Clovis (9) | | |
| 1984 | Vaughn (3)*** | Reserve (3) | Animas (1) / Tularosa (2) * | Artesia (14) | Clovis (8) | | |
| 1983 | Vaughn (2)*** | Texico | Jal (8) | Artesia (13) | Clovis (7) | | |
| 1982 | Roy (7)*** | Capitan (3) | Moriarty (2) | Artesia (12) | Clovis (6) | | |
| 1981 | Roy (6)*** | Reserve (2) | Moriarty | Portales (2) | Clovis (5) | | |
| 1980 | Roy (5)*** | Reserve (1) | Jal (7) | Artesia (11) | Eldorado | | |
| 1979 | Roy (4)*** | Hagerman (5) | Estancia (1) | Portales (1) | Santa Fe (1) | | |
| Year | A | AA | AAA | AAAA | | | |
| 1978 | Hagerman (4) | Eunice (8) | Artesia (10) | Clovis (4) | | | |
| 1977 | Hagerman (3) | Eunice (7) | Socorro | Clovis (3) | | | |
| 1976 | Carrizozo (9) | McCurdy Mission (2) | Artesia (9) | Sandia (1) | | | |
| 1975 | Hagerman (2) | Eunice (6) | Artesia (8) | Las Cruces (1) | | | |
| 1974 | Hagerman | Jal (6) | Artesia (7) | Del Norte (1) | | | |
| 1973 | Cloudcroft (1) / Vaughn (1) * | Kirtland Central (5) | St. Pius X | Clovis (2) | | | |
| 1972 | Carrizozo (8) | Ruidoso (3) | St. Michael's (2) | Hobbs (2) | | | |
| 1971 | Carrizozo (7) | Jal (5) | Cobre | Mayfield (1) | | | |
| 1970 | Carrizozo (6) | Jal (4) | Lovington (8) | Hobbs (1) | | | |
| 1969 | Carrizozo (5) | Kirtland Central (4) | Lovington (7) | Artesia (6) | | | |
| Year | C | B | A | AA | | | |
| 1968 | Navajo Mission (1) | Hot Springs (1) | Lovington (6) | Artesia (5) | | | |
| 1967 | Roy (3) | Jal (3) | Goddard (1) | Artesia (4) | | | |
| 1966 | Roy (2) | Bloomfield (1) | Los Alamos (1) | Artesia (3) | | | |
| 1965 | Roy (1) | Eunice (5) | NMMI (2) | Highland (3) | | | |
| 1964 | Carrizozo (4) | Kirtland Central (3) | St. Michael's | Artesia (2) | | | |
| 1963 | Carrizozo (3) | Kirtland Central (2) | NMMI (1) | Highland (2) | | | |
| 1962 | McCurdy Mission (1) | Eunice (4) | Gadsden (5) | Carlsbad (6) | | | |
| 1961 | Carrizozo (2) | Eunice (3) | Gadsden (4) | Carlsbad (5) | | | |
| 1960 | Carrizozo (1) | Jal (2) | Lovington (5) | Clovis (1) | | | |
| 1959 | Menaul (1) | Jal (1) | Tucumcari (1) | Las Cruces (1) | | | |
| 1958 | Kirtland Central (1) | Eunice (2) | Lovington (4) | Carlsbad (4) | | | |
| 1957 | Ruidoso (3) | Eunice (1) | Lovington (3) | Artesia (1) | | | |
| 1956 | Tatum (1) | Gallup Cathedral (2) | Raton (1) | Carlsbad (3) | | | |
| 1955 | Ruidoso (2) | Santa Rosa (1) | Gadsden (3) | Roswell (2) | | | |
| 1954 | Tularosa (1) | Gallup Cathedral (1) | Gadsden (2) | Highland (1) | | | |
| 1953 | Capitan (2) | Aztec (1) | Gadsden (1) | Roswell (1) | | | |
| Year | B | A | | | | | |
| 1952# | Lovington (2) / Capitan (1) * | Farmington (1) | | | | | |
| Year | C | B | A | | | | |
| 1951# | Melrose (1) / El Rito (1) * | Lovington (1) | Carlsbad (2) | | | | |
| 1950# | Ruidoso (1) | Alamogordo (1) | Carlsbad (1) | | | | |

* Co-champs
** Co-op program
*** Six-Man was not sanctioned by the NMAA at this time
# Championships determined by a points system. Beginning in 1953 championships were determined by a playoff system

=== Soccer ===
| Year | Boys' A-AAA | Boys' AAAA | Boys' A-AAAA | Boys' AAAAA | Boys' AAAAAA | Girls' A-AAA | Girls' AAAA | Girls' A-AAAA | Girls' AAAAA | Girls' AAAAAA |
|---|---|---|---|---|---|---|---|---|---|---|
| 2025 | Sandia Prep | St. Pius X | | Sandia | | Sandia Prep | Hope Christian | | Volcano Vista | |
| 2025 | Santa Fe Prep | St. Pius X | | La Cueva | | St. Michael's | Hope Christian | | Eldorado | |
| 2024 | NMMI | Albuquerque Academy | | Centennial | | Sandia Prep | Hope Christian | | La Cueva | |
| 2023 | NMMI | St. Pius | | Hobbs | | Sandia Prep | Hope Christian | | Cleveland | |
| 2022 | Sandia Prep | Lovington | | Cleveland | | Sandia Prep | Hope Christian | | Eldorado | |
| 2021 | Sandia Prep | Albuquerque Academy | | Santa Fe | | Sandia Prep | Hope Christian | | Cibola | |
| 2020 | Sandia Prep | Albuquerque Academy | | Rio Rancho | | St. Micheal's | St. Pius X | | Carlsbad | |
| 2019 | St. Michael's | Los Lunas | | Albuquerque | | Sandia Prep | St. Pius X | | Volcano Vista | |
| 2018 | Sandia Prep | Albuquerque Academy | | Cleveland | | Sandia Prep | Albuquerque Academy | | Sandia | |
| 2017 | | | Hope Christian | Alamogordo | Albuquerque | | | Sandia Prep | Albuquerque Academy | La Cueva |
| 2016 | | | Santa Fe Prep | Albuquerque Academy | La Cueva | | | Sandia Prep | Albuquerque Academy | Cibola |
| 2015 | | | Bosque | Albuquerque Academy | Albuquerque | | | Hope Christian | St. Pius X | Cibola |
| 2014 | | | Santa Fe Prep | Capital | Volcano Vista | | | Hope Christian | St. Pius X | La Cueva |
| 2013 | Sandia Prep | Roswell | | Las Cruces | | Hope Christian | St. Pius X | | Eldorado | |
| 2012 | Sandia Prep | Chaparral | | La Cueva | | Sandia Prep | Albuquerque Academy | | La Cueva | |
| 2011 | Sandia Prep | Farmington | | Eldorado | | Sandia Prep | Albuquerque Academy | | La Cueva | |
| 2010 | Sandia Prep | Los Alamos | | Eldorado | | Hope Christian | Albuquerque Academy | | Volcano Vista | |
| 2009 | Bosque School | Farmington | | La Cueva | | St. Michael's | Albuquerque Academy | | Eldorado | |
| 2008 | Bosque School | St. Pius X | | La Cueva | | Bosque School | Albuquerque Academy | | Sandia | |
| 2007 | Hope Christian | St. Pius X | | Las Cruces | | St. Michael's | St. Pius X | | Rio Rancho | |
| 2006 | Sandia Prep | St. Pius X | | Eldorado | | Sandia Prep | St. Pius X | | La Cueva | |
| 2005 | Sandia Prep | St. Pius X | | Eldorado | | Santa Fe Prep | St. Pius X | | Las Cruces | |
| 2004 | Sandia Prep | St. Pius X | | Las Cruces | | Sandia Prep | St. Pius X | | La Cueva | |
| 2003 | Sandia Prep | St. Pius X | | Eldorado | | Santa Fe Prep | Los Alamos | | Las Cruces | |
| 2002 | Sandia Prep | St. Pius X | | La Cueva | | Sandia Prep | Albuquerque Academy | | La Cueva | |
| 2001 | Sandia Prep | Albuquerque Academy | | Eldorado | | St. Michael's | Albuquerque Academy | | Eldorado | |
| 2000 | Santa Teresa | Albuquerque Academy / St. Pius X (tie) | | Eldorado | | Hope Christian | Albuquerque Academy | | Sandia | |
| 1999 | Albuquerque Academy / St. Pius X (tie) | Manzano | | | | St. Pius X | Eldorado | | | |
| 1998 | St. Pius X | Clovis | | | | Los Alamos | La Cueva | | | |
| 1997 | St. Pius X | Hobbs | | | | | | La Cueva | | |
| 1996 | St. Pius X | La Cueva | | | | | | Sandia | | |
| 1995 | St. Pius X | Eldorado | | | | | | La Cueva | | |
| 1994 | St. Pius X | La Cueva | | | | | | La Cueva | | |
| 1993 | Sandia Prep | Alamogordo / St. Pius X (tie) | | | | | | La Cueva | | |
| 1992 | Sandia Prep | Sandia | | | | | | Eldorado / La Cueva (tie) | | |
| 1991 | Aztec | Highland | | | | | | La Cueva | | |
| 1990 | Sandia Prep | St. Pius X | | | | | | La Cueva | | |
| 1989 | Pojoaque / Sandia Prep (tie) | Highland / La Cueva (tie) | | | | | | Eldorado / La Cueva (tie) | | |
| 1988 | Sandia Prep | St. Pius X | | | | | | Eldorado | | |
| 1987 | Sandia Prep | Manzano | | | | | | Eldorado / Los Alamos (tie) | | |
| 1986 | Bernalillo | Los Alamos | | | | | | Eldorado | | |
| 1985 | Sandia Prep | Highland | | | | | | Sandia / Los Alamos (tie) | | |
| 1984 | Hope Christian | Albuquerque Academy | | | | | | Eldorado | | |
| 1983 | Hope Christian | Albuquerque Academy | | | | | | Los Alamos | | |
| 1982 | Santa Fe Prep | Sandia | | | | | | Eldorado | | |
| 1981 | Hope Christian / Santa Fe Prep (tie) | Highland | | | | | | Los Alamos | | |

=== Volleyball ===
| Year | B | A | AA | AAA | AAAA | AAAAA | AAAAAA |
|---|---|---|---|---|---|---|---|
| 2026 | | Melrose | Legacy Academy | St. Michael's | St. Pius X | Las Cueva | |
| 2025 | | Quemado | Legacy Academy | Cobre | St. Pius X | Las Cruces | |
| 2024 | | Quemado | Texico | St. Michael's | St. Pius X | Las Cruces | |
| 2023 | | Melrose | Texico | St. Michael's | St. Pius X | Las Cruces | |
| 2022 | | Gateway Christian | Laguna Acoma | St. Michaels | Goddard | La Cueva | |
| 2021 | | Melrose | Laguna Acoma | Robertson | Artesia | La Cueva | |
| 2020-21 | | Melrose | Cloudcroft | Sandia Prep | Albuquerque Academy | Centennial | |
| 2019 | | Logan | Texico | Robertson | St. Pius X | La Cueva | |
| 2018 | | Logan | Texico | St. Michael's | Los Lunas | La Cueva | |
| 2017 | | Melrose | Logan | Texico | Sandia Prep | Los Lunas | Sandia |
| 2016 | | Elida | Mora | Texico | Sandia Prep | St. Pius X | Centennial |
| 2015 | | Elida | Melrose | Texico | Sandia Prep | Los Lunas | La Cueva |
| 2014 | | Elida | Ramah | Texico | Ruidoso | Centennial | Cibola |
| 2013 | Elida | Fort Sumner | Hatch Valley | Pojoaque | Goddard | Sandia | |
| 2012 | Elida | Tatum | Bosque | Pojoaque | St. Pius X | V. Sue Cleveland | |
| 2011 | Elida | Tatum | Texico | Pojoaque | Artesia | Gadsden | |
| 2010 | Elida | Tatum | Texico | Pojoaque | Artesia | Gadsden | |
| 2009 | | Tatum | Texico | Pojoaque | Goddard | Rio Rancho | |
| 2008 | | Fort Sumner | Texico | Ruidoso | Moriarty | Mayfield | |
| 2007 | | Animas | Texico | Portales | Moriarty | Rio Rancho | |
| 2006 | | Fort Sumner | Texico | Pojoaque | Roswell | Rio Rancho | |
| 2005 | | Tatum | Ramah | Portales | Deming | Rio Rancho | |
| 2004 | | Fort Sumner | Sandia Prep | Ruidoso | Deming | Mayfield | |
| 2003 | | Des Moines | Hope Christian | Portales | St. Pius X | Rio Rancho | |
| 2002 | | Des Moines | Capitan | St. Michael's | St. Pius X | Rio Rancho | |
| 2001 | | Des Moines | Texico | Portales | Goddard | Las Cruces | |
| 2000 | | Animas | Fort Sumner | Portales | Goddard | Las Cruces | |
| 1999 | | Melrose | Animas | St. Pius X | Goddard | | |
| 1998 | | Des Moines | Dexter | Albuquerque Academy | Las Cruces | | |
| 1997 | | Hagerman | Hope Christian | St. Pius X | Las Cruces | | |
| 1996 | | Fort Sumner | Eunice | Los Alamos | Santa Fe | | |
| 1995 | | Tatum | Hope Christian | Los Alamos | Las Cruces | | |
| 1994 | | Tatum | Hope Christian | St. Pius X | Santa Fe | | |
| 1993 | | Roy | Hot Springs | Deming | Roswell | | |
| 1992 | | Roy | Hot Springs | Aztec | West Mesa | | |
| 1991 | | Dora | Hot Springs | Onate | West Mesa | | |
| 1990 | | Elida | Hot Springs | Ruidoso | West Mesa | | |
| 1989 | | Floyd | Hot Springs | Goddard | West Mesa | | |
| 1988 | | Capitan | Hot Springs | Kirtland Central | West Mesa | | |
| 1987 | | Tatum | Hot Springs | Goddard | Los Alamos | | |
| 1986 | | Elida | Mora | Goddard | Alamogordo | | |
| 1985 | | Texico | Hatch Valley | Hot Springs | West Mesa | | |
| 1984 | | Texico | Jal | Goddard | West Mesa | | |
| 1983 | | Melrose | McCurdy | Moriarty | Santa Fe | | |
| 1982 | | Melrose | McCurdy | Hot Springs | Goddard | | |
| 1981 | | Melrose | Estancia | Aztec | Cibola | | |
| 1980 | | Texico | Animas | Portales | Goddard | | |
| 1979 | | Floyd | Animas | Los Lunas | Alamogordo | | |
| 1978 | | Capitan | Estancia | Artesia | Santa Fe | | |
| 1977 | | Quemado | Estancia | Artesia | Roswell | | |
| 1976 | | Tatum | Estancia | Portales | Roswell | | |
| 1975 | | Dexter | Manzano | | | | |
| 1974 | | Dexter | Cibola | | | | |
| 1973 | | Sandia | | | | | |

== Winter sports ==
=== Wrestling ===
| Year | A-AAA | AAA-Dual | AAAA | AAAA-Dual | A-AAAA | AAAAA | AAAAA-Dual | AAAAAA |
|---|---|---|---|---|---|---|---|---|
| 2026 | | | | | Aztec | Cleveland | | |
| 2025 | | | | | Aztec | Volcano Vista | | |
| 2024 | | | | | Bloomfield | Volcano Vista | | |
| 2023 | | | | | Belen | Volcano Vista | | |
| 2022 | West Las Vegas | | Aztec | | | Farmington | | |
| 2021 | Cobre | | Aztec | | | Farmington | | |
| 2020 | Cobre | | Aztec | | | Piedra Vista | | |
| 2019 | Cobre | | Aztec | | | Rio Rancho | | |
| 2018 | | | | | Silver | Aztec | | Rio Rancho |
| 2017 | | | | | Silver | Belen | | V. Sue Cleveland |
| 2016 | | | | | Cobre | Belen | | V. Sue Cleveland |
| 2015 | | | | | Robertson | Piedra Vista | | Rio Rancho |
| 2014 | Bloomfield | | Piedra Vista | | | Rio Rancho | | |
| 2013 | St. Michael's | | Piedra Vista | | | V. Sue Cleveland / Rio Grande (tie) | | |
| 2012 | St. Michael's | | Piedra Vista | | | V. Sue Cleveland | | |
| 2011 | Silver City | | Piedra Vista | | | Rio Rancho | | |
| 2010 | St. Michael's | | Volcano Vista | | | Rio Rancho | | |
| 2009 | Robertson | | Silver City | | | Rio Rancho | | |
| 2008 | Robertson | | Belen | | | Rio Rancho | | |
| 2007 | Robertson | | Belen | | | Rio Rancho | | |
| 2006 | Robertson | | Belen | | | Eldorado | | |
| 2005 | Cobre | | Belen | | | Rio Rancho | | |
| 2004 | Cobre | Cobre | Belen | Belen | | Rio Rancho | Rio Rancho | |
| 2003 | Robertson | Robertson | Belen | Farmington | | Rio Rancho | Rio Rancho | |
| 2002 | Robertson | Robertson | Aztec | Aztec | | La Cueva | La Cueva | |
| 2001 | Robertson | Robertson | Farmington | Farmington | | Del Norte | Del Norte | |
| 2000 | Aztec | | Del Norte | | | | | |
| 1999 | Aztec | | West Mesa | | | | | |
| 1998 | Aztec | | Los Lunas | | | | | |
| 1997 | Aztec | | Carlsbad | | | | | |
| 1996 | Aztec | | Carlsbad | | | | | |
| 1995 | Aztec | | Carlsbad | | | | | |
| 1994 | Aztec | | West Mesa | | | | | |
| 1993 | Aztec | | Farmington | | | | | |
| 1992 | Aztec | | Farmington | | | | | |
| 1991 | Aztec | | West Mesa | | | | | |
| 1990 | Aztec | | West Mesa | | | | | |
| 1989 | Taos | | Carlsbad | | | | | |
| 1988 | Taos | | Rio Grande | | | | | |
| 1987 | Belen | | Eldorado | | | | | |
| 1986 | Los Lunas | | Eldorado | | | | | |
| 1985 | Los Lunas | | Farmington | | | | | |
| 1984 | Bloomfield | | Rio Grande | | | | | |
| 1983 | Albuquerque Academy | | Eldorado | | | | | |
| 1982 | Aztec | | Cibola | | | | | |
| 1981 | Los Lunas | | Sandia | | | | | |
| 1980 | Los Lunas | | Sandia | | | | | |
| 1979 | Albuquerque Academy | | Mayfield | | | | | |
| 1978 | Albuquerque Academy | | Manzano | | | | | |
| 1977 | Albuquerque Academy | | Carlsbad | | | | | |
| 1976 | St. Michael's | | Carlsbad | | | | | |
| 1975 | St. Michael's | | Manzano | | | | | |
| 1974 | St. Michael's | | Albuquerque | | | | | |
| 1973 | St. Michael's | | Sandia | | | | | |
| 1972 | St. Michael's | | Sandia | | | | | |
| 1971 | Aztec | | Carlsbad | | | | | |
| 1970 | Belen | | Carlsbad | | | | | |
| 1969 | Albuquerque Academy | | Albuquerque | | | | | |
| 1968 | Carlsbad | | | | | | | |
| 1967 | Albuquerque | | | | | | | |
| 1966 | Las Cruces | | | | | | | |
| 1965 | Albuquerque | | | | | | | |
| 1964 | Las Cruces | | | | | | | |
| 1963 | Aztec | | | | | | | |
| 1962 | Highland | | | | | | | |
| 1961 | Albuquerque | | | | | | | |
| 1960 | Sandia | | | | | | | |
| 1959 | Albuquerque | | | | | | | |
| 1958 | Highland | | | | | | | |
| 1957 | Highland | | | | | | | |

=== Swimming and Diving ===
| Year | Boys' A-AAAAAA | Girls' A-AAAAAA |
|---|---|---|
| 2026 | Albuquerque Academy | Albuquerque Academy |
| 2025 | Albuquerque Academy | Albuquerque Academy |
| 2024 | Eldorado | ABQ Academy |
| 2023 | Eldorado | ABQ Academy |
| 2022 | Los Alamos | Albuquerque Academy |
| 2021 | Los Alamos | Albuquerque Academy |
| 2020 | Los Alamos | Albuquerque Academy |
| 2019 | La Cueva | Albuquerque Academy |
| 2018 | Eldorado | Albuquerque Academy |
| 2017 | Albuquerque Academy | Albuquerque Academy |
| 2016 | Albuquerque Academy | La Cueva |
| 2015 | Albuquerque Academy | Eldorado |
| 2014 | Cibola | Eldorado |
| 2013 | Eldorado | Eldorado |
| 2012 | Eldorado | Albuquerque Academy |
| 2011 | Albuquerque Academy | Albuquerque Academy |
| 2010 | Albuquerque Academy | Albuquerque Academy |
| 2009 | Albuquerque Academy | Albuquerque Academy |
| 2008 | Albuquerque Academy | La Cueva |
| 2007 | Albuquerque Academy | Albuquerque Academy |
| 2006 | Albuquerque Academy | Albuquerque Academy |
| 2005 | Los Alamos | Albuquerque Academy |
| 2004 | Los Alamos | Los Alamos |
| 2003 | Albuquerque Academy | Albuquerque Academy |
| 2002 | Albuquerque Academy | Albuquerque Academy |
| 2001 | Albuquerque Academy | La Cueva |
| 2000 | Albuquerque Academy | Albuquerque Academy |
| 1999 | Albuquerque Academy | La Cueva |
| 1998 | Farmington | La Cueva |
| 1997 | Albuquerque Academy | La Cueva |
| 1996 | La Cueva | La Cueva |
| 1995 | Albuquerque Academy | La Cueva |
| 1994 | Albuquerque Academy | Albuquerque Academy |
| 1993 | Eldorado | Los Alamos |
| 1992 | Albuquerque Academy | Los Alamos |
| 1991 | Los Alamos | Albuquerque Academy |
| 1990 | Los Alamos | Albuquerque Academy |
| 1989 | Albuquerque Academy | Albuquerque Academy |
| 1988 | Los Alamos | Los Alamos |
| 1987 | Los Alamos | Albuquerque Academy |
| 1986 | Albuquerque Academy | Albuquerque Academy |
| 1985 | Albuquerque Academy | Los Alamos |
| 1984 | Los Alamos | Los Alamos |
| 1983 | Los Alamos | Las Cruces |
| 1982 | Los Alamos | Los Alamos |
| 1981 | Los Alamos | Los Alamos |
| 1980 | Los Alamos | Los Alamos |
| 1979 | Los Alamos | Los Alamos |
| 1978 | Los Alamos | Los Alamos |
| 1977 | Los Alamos | Los Alamos |
| 1976 | Los Alamos | Los Alamos |
| 1975 | Albuquerque Academy | Eldorado/Highland |
| 1974 | Los Alamos | Eldorado |
| 1973 | Albuquerque Academy/Del Norte | Eldorado |
| 1972 | Albuquerque Academy | Los Alamos |
| 1971 | Los Alamos | Farmington |
| 1970 | Highland | Los Alamos |
| 1969 | Highland | |
| 1968 | Highland | |
| 1967 | Highland | |
| 1966 | NMMI | |
| 1965 | Highland | |
| 1964 | Highland | |
| 1963 | Highland | |
| 1962 | NMMI | |
| 1961 | Roswell | |
| 1960 | NMMI | |
| 1959 | NMMI | |
| 1958 | Highland | |
| 1957 | NMMI | |
| 1956 | Los Alamos | |

=== Boys' Basketball ===
| Year | B | A | AA | AAA | AAAA | AAAAA | AAAAAA |
|---|---|---|---|---|---|---|---|
| 2026 | | Ft. Sumner (5)/House (5)** | Texico (7) | St. Michael's (13) | Highland (4) | Volcano Vista (6) | |
| 2025 | | Logan (3) | Texico (6) | Robertson (2) | Artesia (3) | Volcano Vista (5) | |
| 2024 | | Ft. Sumner (4)/House (4)** | ATC (1) | Navajo Prep (1) | Highland (3) | Volcano Vista (4) | |
| 2023 | | Ft. Sumner (3)/House (3)** | Pecos (6) | St. Michael's (12) | Albuquerque Academy (10) | Volcano Vista (3) | |
| 2022 | | Magdalena (3) | Menaul (1) | Robertson (1) | Highland (2) | Volcano Vista (2) | |
| 2021 | | Magdalena (2) | Rehoboth Christian (2) | Hot Springs (4) | Del Norte (1) | V. Sue Cleveland (1) | |
| 2020 | | Melrose (6) | Pecos (5) | Bosque Prep (1) | Valley (5) | Las Cruces (7) | |
| 2019 | | Melrose (5) | Pecos (4) | Hot Springs (3) | Valley (4) | Atrisco Heritage (2) | |
| 2018 | | Melrose (5) | Fort Sumner (2)/House (2) | Pecos (3) | Hope Christian (16) | Belen (1) | Atrisco Heritage (1) |
| 2017 | | Maxwell (1) | Lordsburg (4) | Pecos (2) | Hope Christian (15) | Roswell (9) | Volcano Vista (1) |
| 2016 | | Cliff (12) | Melrose (4) | Texico (5) | Hope Christian (14) | Espanola Valley (2) | Rio Rancho (2) |
| 2015 | | Cliff (11) | Magdalena (1) | Mesilla Valley (4) | Hope Christian (13) | Centennial (1) | Hobbs (16) |
| 2014 | Hondo Valley (2) | Hagerman (4) | Dexter (1) | Hope Christian (12) | Roswell (8) | Valley (3) | |
| 2013 | Hondo Valley (1) | Cliff (10) | Laguna-Acoma (1) | Hope Christian (11) | St. Pius X (6) | Las Cruces (6) | |
| 2012 | Wagon Mound (3) | Logan (2) | Tularosa (1) | St. Michael's (11) | Santa Teresa (1) | Eldorado (4) | |
| 2011 | Quemado (1) | Hagerman (3) | Mesilla Valley (3) | Hope Christian (10) | Espanola Valley (1) | Onate (1) | |
| 2010 | | Cliff (9) | Mesilla Valley (2) | Hope Christian (9) | Roswell (7) | La Cueva (13) | |
| 2009 | | Fort Sumner (1) | Texico (4) | Hope Christian (8) | Roswell (6) | La Cueva (12) | |
| 2008 | | Cliff (8) | Texico (3) | Pojoaque (1) | St. Pius X (5) | Hobbs (15) | |
| 2007 | | Gateway Christian (1) | Mesilla Valley (1) | St. Michael's (10) | St. Pius X (4) | Rio Rancho (1) | |
| 2006 | | Des Moines (1) | Hope Christian (7) | St. Michael's (9) | St. Pius X (3) | Manzano (3) | |
| 2005 | | Temple Baptist (1) | Mora (4) | Bernalillo (5) | Deming (4) | Eldorado (3) | |
| 2004 | | Springer (3) | Hope Christian (6) | Bernalillo (4) | Capital (1) | Eldorado (2) | |
| 2003 | | Dora (2) | Hope Christian (5) | St. Michael's (8) | Kirtland Central (9) | La Cueva (11) | |
| 2002 | | Springer (2) | Hope Christian (4) | St. Michael's (7) | Kirtland Central (3) | Hobbs (14) | |
| 2001 | | Melrose (3) | Texico (2) | Portales (5) | Kirtland Central (2) | Hobbs (13) | |
| 2000 | | Tatum (1) | Jal (3) | Los Alamos (1) | Hobbs (13) | | |
| 1999 | | Cliff (7) | Hope Christian (3) | St. Michael's (6) | Hobbs (12) | | |
| 1998 | | Logan (1) | Mora (3) | Socorro (1) | Albuquerque High (12) | | |
| 1997 | | Cliff (6) | Mesa Vista (2) | Artesia (2) | Alamogordo (3) | | |
| 1996 | | Cliff (5) | Navajo Pine (1) | Silver (2) | Valley (2) | | |
| 1995 | | Grady (3) | Mora (2) | Artesia (1) | Albuquerque High (11) | | |
| 1994 | | Cliff (4) | Questa (1) | Albuquerque Academy (9) | La Cueva (10) | | |
| 1993 | | Melrose (2) | Hot Springs (2) | Albuquerque Academy (8) | Albuquerque High (10) | | |
| 1992 | | Melrose (1) | Hope Christian (2) | Albuquerque Academy (7) | Alamogordo (2) | | |
| 1991 | | Loving (1) | Hot Springs (1) | Albuquerque Academy (6) | Alamogordo (1) | | |
| 1990 | | Springer (1) | Santa Rosa (4) | Albuquerque Academy (5) | Albuquerque High (9) | | |
| 1989 | | Cloudcroft (2) | Santa Fe Indian School (1) | Albuquerque Academy (4) | La Cueva (1) | | |
| 1988 | | Cloudcroft (1) | Escalante (2) | Goddard (1) | Hobbs (11) | | |
| 1987 | | Floyd (2) | Clayton (2) | Bernalillo (3) | Hobbs (10) | | |
| 1986 | | Floyd (1) | Mesa Vista (1) | Grants (2) | Farmington (2) | | |
| 1985 | | Cliff (3) | Hope Christian (1) | St. Pius X (2) | Sandia (3) | | |
| 1984 | | Texico (1) | Santa Rosa (3) | Albuquerque Academy (3) | Albuquerque High (8) | | |
| 1983 | | Cliff (2) | Escalante (1) | Lovington (2) | Eldorado (1) | | |
| 1982 | | Cliff (1) | Moriarty (1) | St. Pius X (1) | Farmington (1) | | |
| 1981 | | Reserve (2) | Penasco (1) | Albuquerque Academy (2) | Hobbs (9) | | |
| 1980 | | Grady (2) | Clayton (1) | St. Pius X (1) | Hobbs (8) | | |
| 1979 | | Cimarron (1) | Mora (1) | Bernalillo (2) | Clovis (4) | | |
| 1978 | | Grady (1) | Animas (1) | Kirtland Central (1) | Santa Fe (1) | | |
| 1977 | | Rehoboth Christian (1) | Jal (2) | Bernalillo (1) | Albuquerque High (7) | | |
| 1976 | | Wagon Mound (2) | Eunice (5) | Deming (3) | Las Cruces (7) | | |
| 1975 | | | Jal (1) | Silver (1) | Las Cruces (6) | | |
| 1974 | | | Lordsburg (3) | Deming (2) | Manzano (2) | | |
| 1973 | | | Lordsburg (2) | Portales (4) | Manzano (1) | | |
| 1972 | | | Reserve (1) | Deming (1) | Highland (1) | | |
| 1971 | | | Eunice (4) | Deming (1) | Albuquerque High (6) | | |
| 1970 | | | Dora (1) | Grants (1) | Hobbs (7) | | |
| 1969 | Eunice (3) | St. Michael's (5) | Hobbs (6) | | | | |
| 1968 | Albuquerque Academy (1) | St. Michael's (4) | Hobbs (5) | | | | |
| 1967 | Taos Central (1) | St. Michael's (3) | Sandia (2) | | | | |
| 1966 | Pecos (1) | Portales (3) | Hobbs (4) | | | | |
| 1965 | Mora (1) | Portales (2) | Valley (1) | | | | |
| 1964 | Hatch Valley (1) | Los Alamos (1) | Roswell (5) | | | | |
| 1963 | San Jon (3) | Roswell (4) | | | | | |
| 1962 | San Jon (2) | Sandia (1) | | | | | |
| 1961 | San Jon (1) | Las Cruces (5) | | | | | |
| 1960 | Eunice (2) | Las Cruces (4) | | | | | |
| 1959 | El Rito (2) | Las Cruces (3) | | | | | |
| 1958 | Eunice (1) | Hobbs (3) | | | | | |
| 1957 | El Rito (1) | Hobbs (2) | | | | | |
| 1956 | Santa Rosa (2) | Hobbs (1) | | | | | |
| 1955 | Santa Rosa (1) | Carlsbad (2) | | | | | |
| 1954 | Wagon Mound (1) | Carlsbad (2) | | | | | |
| 1953 | Clovis (3) | | | | | | |
| 1952 | Roswell (3) | | | | | | |
| 1951 | Clovis (2) | | | | | | |
| 1950 | Tucumcari (1) | | | | | | |
| 1949 | Lovington (1) | | | | | | |
| 1948 | Portales (1) | | | | | | |
| 1947 | Carlsbad (1) | | | | | | |
| 1946 | Albuquerque High (5) | | | | | | |
| 1945 | Las Cruces (2) | | | | | | |
| 1944 | Virden (2) | | | | | | |
| 1943 | Capitan (1) | | | | | | |
| 1942 | St. Michael's (2) | | | | | | |
| 1941 | Las Cruces (1) | | | | | | |
| 1940 | St. Michael's (1) | | | | | | |
| 1939 | Lordsburg (1) | | | | | | |
| 1938 | House (1) | | | | | | |
| 1937 | Albuquerque High (4) | | | | | | |
| 1936 | Raton (3) | | | | | | |
| 1935 | Floyd (1) | | | | | | |
| 1934 | Virden (1) | | | | | | |
| 1933 | Forrest (2) | | | | | | |
| 1932 | Raton (2) | | | | | | |
| 1931 | Forrest (1) | | | | | | |
| 1930 | Clovis (1) | | | | | | |
| 1929 | Raton (1) | | | | | | |
| 1928 | Albuquerque Indian (1) | | | | | | |
| 1927 | Roswell (2) | | | | | | |
| 1926 | Roswell (1) | | | | | | |
| 1925 | Albuquerque High (3) | | | | | | |
| 1924 | Hagerman (2) | | | | | | |
| 1923 | Hagerman (1) | | | | | | |
| 1922 | Albuquerque High (2) | | | | | | |
| 1921 | Albuquerque High (1) | | | | | | |

=== Girls' Basketball ===
| Year | A | AA | AAA | AAAA | AAAAA | |
|---|---|---|---|---|---|---|
| 2026 | Logan (3) | Mesa Vista | Sante Fe Indian (4) | Kirtland Central (22) | Hobbs (5) | |
| 2025 | Roy (6)/Mosquero (3) | Tatum (5) | Navajo Prep (9) | Gallup (8) | Sandia (6) | |
| 2024 | Ft. Sumner (9)/House (3) | Penasco | Navajo Prep (8) | Kirtland Central (21) | Sandia (5) | |
| 2023 | Roy (5)/Mosquero (2) | Texico (12) | Tohatchi (2) | Gallup (7) | Hobbs (4) | |
| 2022 | Ft. Sumner (8)/House (2) | Clayton (13) | Robertson (2) | Kirtland Central (20) | Volcano Vista (5) | |
| 2021 | Roy (4)/Mosquero | Pecos (2) | Navajo Prep (7) | Gallup (6) | Volcano Vista (4) | |
| 2020 | Melrose (8) | Mescalero Apache | Navajo Prep (6) | Los Lunas (5) | Hobbs (3) | |
| 2019 | Tatum (4) | Pecos | Robertson | Los Lunas (4) | West Mesa | |
| Year | A | AA | AAA | AAAA | AAAAA | AAAAAA |
| 2018 | Elida (9) | Fort Sumner (7)/House | Texico (11) | Portales (8) | Los Lunas (3) | Hobbs (2) |
| 2017 | Elida (8) | Tatum (3) | Tohatchi | Shiprock (5) | Goddard | Sandia (4) |
| 2016 | Elida (7) | Melrose (7) | Texico (10) | Hope Christian (3) | Roswell | Volcano Vista (3) |
| 2015 | Elida (6) | Melrose (6) | Texico (9) | Hope Christian (2) | Los Lunas (2) | Cibola |
| Year | B | A | AA | AAA | AAAA | AAAAA |
| 2014 | Elida (5) | Tatum (2) | Tularosa | Portales (7) | Santa Fe (2) | Volcano Vista (2) |
| 2013 | Elida (4) | Logan (2) | Navajo Pine (2) | Lovington (2) | Los Lunas | Clovis (4) |
| 2012 | Elida (3) | Melrose (5) | Texico (8) | Lovington | Kirtland Central (19) | Volcano Vista |
| 2011 | Elida (2) | Fort Sumner (6) | Navajo Pine | Santa Fe Indian (3) | Gallup (5) | Mayfield (3) |
| Year | A | AA | AAA | AAAA | AAAAA | |
| 2010 | Floyd (4) | Texico (7) | Santa Fe Indian (2) | Kirtland Central (18) | Sandia (3) | |
| 2009 | Cimarron (3) | Navajo Prep (6) | Pojoaque (2) | St. Pius X (3) | La Cueva (2) | |
| 2008 | Animas (2) | Texico (6) | Pojoaque (2) | St. Pius X (2) | La Cueva | |
| 2007 | Cimarron (2) | Texico (5) | Hope Christian | Aztec | Mayfield (2) | |
| 2006 | Cimarron | Ramah (2) | Portales (6) | St. Pius X | Gallup (4) | |
| 2005 | Fort Sumner (5) | Ramah | Santa Fe Indian | Kirtland Central (17) | Clovis (4) | |
| 2004 | Des Moines (4) | Cimarron | Portales (5) | Kirtland Central (16) | Mayfield | |
| 2003 | Des Moines (3) | Coronado | Portales (4) | Kirtland Central (15) | Hobbs | |
| 2002 | Des Moines (2) | Texico (4) | Shiprock (4) | Farmington (2) | Gallup (3) | |
| 2001 | Cliff (3) | Texico (3) | Portales (3) | Kirtland Central (14) | Sandia (2) | |
| Year | A | AA | AAA | AAAA | | |
| 2000 | Cliff (2) | Texico (2) | Silver | Clovis (4) | | |
| 1999 | Des Moines | Navajo Prep (5) | Kirtland Central (13) | Clovis (3) | | |
| 1998 | Roy (3) | Mora | Pojoaque | Rio Grande | | |
| 1997 | Fort Sumner (4) | Navajo Prep (4) | Moriarty | Gallup (2) | | |
| 1996 | Fort Sumner (3) | Navajo Prep (3) | Kirtland Central (12) | Sandia | | |
| 1995 | Elida | Navajo Prep (2) | Kirtland Central (11) | Eldorado (15) | | |
| 1994 | Roy (2) | Clayton (12) | Kirtland Central (10) | Gallup | | |
| 1993 | Cliff | Clayton (11) | Kirtland Central (9) | Eldorado (14) | | |
| 1992 | Dora | Animas | Shiprock (4) | Eldorado (13) | | |
| 1991 | Roy | Navajo Academy | Portales (2) | Clovis (2) | | |
| 1990 | Floyd (3) | Clayton (10) | Shiprock (3) | Eldorado (12) | | |
| 1989 | Floyd (2) | Clayton (9) | Shiprock (2) | Eldorado (11) | | |
| 1988 | Tatum | Clayton (8) | Shiprock | Santa Fe | | |
| 1987 | San Jon (2) | Clayton (7) | Kirtland Central (8) | Eldorado (10) | | |
| 1986 | Grady (2) | Clayton (6) | Kirtland Central (7) | Eldorado (9) | | |
| 1985 | Grady | Clayton (5) | Kirtland Central (6) | Alamogordo | | |
| 1984 | Melrose (4) | Clayton (4) | Kirtland Central (5) | Eldorado (8) | | |
| 1983 | Melrose (3) | Clayton (3) | Kirtland Central (4) | Eldorado (7) | | |
| 1982 | Melrose (2) | Jal | Kirtland Central (3) | Higland | | |
| 1981 | Texico | Clayton (2) | Kirtland Central (2) | Eldorado (6) | | |
| 1980 | Logan | Dexter | Kirtland Central | Eldorado (5) | | |
| 1979 | Floyd | Fort Sumner (2) | St. Pius X | Farmington | | |
| 1978 | Reserve | Clayton | Portales | Eldorado (4) | | |
| 1977 | Cloudcroft | Fort Sumner | Artesia | Clovis | | |
| Year | A | AA | | | | |
| 1976 | Melrose | Eldorado (3) | | | | |
| 1975 | Dora | Eldorado (2) | | | | |
| Year | Single Class | | | | | |
| 1974 | Amistad | | | | | |
| 1973 | San Jon | | | | | |

=== Spirit/Dance/Drill ===
| Year | A-AA | AAA | A-AAA | AAAA | A-AAAA | AAAAA | AAAAAA |
|---|---|---|---|---|---|---|---|
| 2026 | | | | | Sandia Prep | Roswell | |
| 2025 | | | | | Sandia Prep | Roswell | |
| 2024 | | | | | Hope Christian | Roswell | |
| 2023 | | | Sandia Prep | Hope Christian | | Roswell | |
| 2022 | | | Sandia Prep | Hope Christian | | Roswell | |
| 2021 | | | St. Michaels | Hope Christian | | Roswell | |
| 2019 | | | St. Michaels | Hope Christian/Valley | | Atrisco Heritage | |
| 2018 | | | | St. Michaels | | Roswell | Valley |
| 2017 | | | | Hope Christian | | Roswell | Valley |
| 2016 | | | | St. Michaels | | Roswell | Valley |
| 2015 | | | Tularosa | St. Michaels | | Roswell | Valley |
| 2014 | Tularosa | St. Michaels | | Roswell | | Valley | |
| 2013 | Gallup Catholic | St. Michaels | | Roswell | | Valley | |
| 2012 | Santa Fe Prep | Hope Christian | | Roswell | | Eldorado | |
| 2011 | Tularosa | St. Michaels | | Gallup | | Valley | |
| 2010 | Santa Fe Prep | St. Michaels | | Farmington | | Valley | |
| 2009 | Valley Christian | St. Michaels | | Roswell | | Valley | |
| 2008 | Valley Christian | Hope Christian | | Roswell | | Valley | |
| 2007 | Valley Christian | St. Michaels | | Roswell | | Valley | |
| 2006 | Hope Christian | St. Michaels | | Roswell | | Valley (small) / Eldorado (large) | |
| 2005 | Hope Christian | St. Michaels | | Roswell | | Gallup (small) / Eldorado (large) | |
| 2004 | Hatch Valley | St. Michaels | | Farmington | | Albuquerque (small) / Eldorado (large) | |
| 2003 | Hope Christian | St. Michaels | | Farmington | | Albuquerque (small) / Eldorado (large) | |
| 2002 | Hope Christian | St. Michaels | | Farmington | | Albuquerque (small) / Del Norte (large) | |
| 2001 | Hope Christian | St. Michaels | | Farmington | | Valley (small) / Eldorado (large) | |
| 2000 | Hope Christian | St. Michaels | | Valley (small) / Del Norte (large) | | | |
| 1999 | Hope Christian | St. Michaels | | Valley (small) / Del Norte (large) | | | |
| 1998 | Hope Christian | St. Michaels | | Valley (small) / Del Norte (large) | | | |
| 1997 | Clayton | St. Michaels | | Valley (small) / Del Norte (large) | | | |

=== Spirit/Cheer ===
| Year | A | AA | A-AA | AAA | AAAA | AAAAA | AAAAAA | COED A-AAAAAA |
|---|---|---|---|---|---|---|---|---|
| 2026 | | | Questa | Cobre | Taos | La Cueva | | Bernalillo (A-4A) / Rio Rancho (5A) |
| 2025 | | | Questa | Cobre | Taos | La Cueva | | Lovington (A-4A) / Hobbs (5A) |
| 2024 | | | Maxwell | Ruidoso | Taos | La Cueva | | Lovington (A-4A) / Organ Mountain (5A) |
| 2023 | | | Questa | Raton | Taos | Eldorado | | Lovington (A-4A) / Hobbs (5A) |
| 2022 | | | Questa | Raton | Taos | Rio Rancho | | Lovington (A-4A) / Hobbs (5A) |
| 2021 | | | Clayton | Raton | Taos | Cleveland | | Lovington (A-4A) / Las Cruces (5A) |
| 2019 | | | Clayton | Raton | Valencia | Rio Rancho | | West Las Vegas (A-3A) / Lovington (4A) / Hobbs (5A) |
| 2018 | | | Questa | Pecos | Taos | Lovington | Eldorado | West Las Vegas (A-4A) / Oñate (5A-6A) |
| 2017 | | | Questa | Pecos | Taos | Valencia | Mayfield | West Las Vegas (A-4A) / Las Cruces (5A-6A) |
| 2016 | | | Gateway Christian | Raton | Taos | Centennial | Rio Rancho | Hatch Valley (A-4A) / Las Cruces (5A-6A) |
| 2015 | | | Gateway Christian | Clayton | Taos | Roswell | Santa Fe | West Las Vegas (A-4A) / Oñate (5A-6A) |
| 2014 | Gateway Christian | Pecos | | Hope Christian | Santa Fe | Eldorado | | Taos (A-3A) / Las Cruces (4A-5A) |
| 2013 | Gateway Christian | Pecos | | Hope Christian | Roswell | Cleveland | | Hot Springs (A-3A) / Las Cruces (4A-5A) |
| 2012 | Escalante | Pecos | | Hope Christian | Roswell | La Cueva | | Las Cruces |
| 2011 | Gateway Christian | Texico | | Hope Christian | Roswell | Rio Rancho | | Eldorado |
| 2010 | Gateway Christian | Escalante | | Hope Christian | Roswell | Rio Rancho | | Albuquerque |
| 2009 | San Jon | Texico | | Hope Christian | Artesia | Eldorado | | Rio Grande |
| 2008 | Floyd | Peñasco | | Hope Christian | Artesia | Sandia | | Del Norte |
| 2007 | Clovis Christian | Pecos | | Hope Christian | Artesia | Eldorado | | Rio Grande |
| 2006 | Clovis Christian | Hope Christian | | Robertson | Aztec (small) / Artesia (large) | La Cueva | | Mayfield |

== Spring sports ==
=== Baseball ===
| Year | A | AA | AAA | AAAA | AAAAA | |
|---|---|---|---|---|---|---|
| 2026 | Grady | Mesilla Valley | East Mountain (2) | Goddard (6) | Piedra Vista (5) | |
| 2025 | Magdalena (2) | Santa Rosa (2) | NMMI (4) | Artesia (7) | Sandia (9) | |
| 2024 | Melrose (4) | Menaul/Oak Grove | Robertson (2) | Grants | La Cueva (13) | |
| 2023 | Melrose (3) | Tularosa (4) | Sandia Prep (8) | St. Pius X (14) | Rio Rancho (4) | |
| 2022 | Logan (2) | Eunice (18) | NMMI (3) | St. Pius X (13) | Carlsbad (12) | |
| 2021 | Logan | Texico (6) | Sandia Prep (7) | Albuquerque Academy (5) | La Cueva (12) | |
| 2020 | Season not played/no championships awarded | | | | | |
| 2019 | Gateway Christian (5) | Texico (5) | Robertson | St. Pius X (12) | Volcano Vista | |
| Year | A | AA | AAA | AAAA | AAAAA | AAAAAA |
| 2018 | Mora | | Texico (4) | Hope Christian (4) | Farmington (14) | La Cueva (10) |
| 2017 | Lordsburg | | Texico (3) | Portales (2) | Goddard (5) | La Cueva (9) |
| 2016 | Melrose (2) | | Texico (2) | Sandia Prep (6) | Centennial | Carlsbad (11) |
| 2015 | Melrose | | Eunice (17) | Sandia Prep (5) | Albuquerque Academy (4) | Eldorado (6) |
| Year | A | AA | AAA | AAAA | AAAAA | |
| 2014 | Gateway Christian (4) | Cobre (7) | Silver (2) | Piedra Vista (4) | La Cueva (8) | |
| 2013 | Jemez Valley (2) | Cobre (6) | Hope Christian (3) | St. Pius X (11) | Rio Rancho (3) | |
| 2012 | Capitan (2) | East Mountain | Portales | Piedra Vista (3) | Carlsbad (10) | |
| 2011 | Capitan | Estancia (3) | Sandia Prep (4) | Piedra Vista (2) | La Cueva (7) | |
| 2010 | Gallup Catholic | Eunice (16) | Bloomfield | Piedra Vista | La Cueva (6) | |
| 2009 | Loving (6) | | Sandia Prep (3) | Albuquerque Academy (3) | Rio Rancho (2) | |
| Year | A | AA | AAA | AAAA | AAAAA | |
| 2008 | Gateway Christian (3) | Loving (5) | Cobre (5) | Farmington (13) | La Cueva (5) | |
| 2007 | Gateway Christian (2) | Estancia (2) | Raton (2) | Farmington (12) | Rio Rancho | |
| 2006 | Gateway Christian | Estancia | Lovington (2) | Farmington (11) | La Cueva (4) | |
| 2005 | Texico | Sandia Prep (2) | Pojoaque (4) | Farmington (10) | La Cueva (3) | |
| 2004 | Loving (4) | | St. Michael's (2) | Deming (3) | La Cueva (2) | |
| 2003 | Loving (3) | | St. Michael's | St. Pius X (10) | La Cueva | |
| 2002 | Jemez Valley | | NMMI (2) | Farmington (9) | Carlsbad (9) | |
| 2001 | Sandia Prep | | NMMI | Farmington (8) | Eldorado (5) | |
| Year | A | AA | AAA | AAAA | | |
| 2000 | Tularosa (3) | | Artesia (6) | Eldorado (5) | | |
| 1999 | Dexter | | Albuquerque Academy (2) | Eldorado (4) | | |
| 1998 | Hope Christian (2) | | Albuquerque Academy | Carlsbad (8) | | |
| 1997 | Eunice (15) | | Silver City | Eldorado (4) | | |
| 1996 | Hope Christian | | Artesia (5) | Carlsbad (7) | | |
| 1995 | Eunice (14) | | Cobre (4) | Farmington (7) | | |
| 1994 | Hot Springs (3) | | Artesia (4) | Farmington (6) | | |
| 1993 | Loving (2) | | Artesia (3) | Eldorado (3) | | |
| 1992 | Clayton | | Goddard (4) | Eldorado (2) | | |
| 1991 | Loving | | Goddard (3) | Farmington (5) | | |
| 1990 | Magdalena | | Raton | Carlsbad (6) | | |
| 1989 | Santa Fe Indian School (3) | | Deming (2) | Carlsbad (5) | | |
| 1988 | Tularosa (2) | | St. Pius X (9) | Carlsbad (4) | | |
| 1987 | Santa Fe Indian School (2) | | Artesia (2) | Highland (3) | | |
| 1986 | Tularosa | | Goddard (2) | Farmington (4) | | |
| 1985 | Jal (4) | | Cobre (3) | Eldorado | | |
| 1984 | Pojoaque (3) | | St. Pius X (8) | Farmington (3) | | |
| Year | AA | AAA | AAAA | | | |
| 1983 | Jal (3) | St. Pius X (7) | Cibola | | | |
| 1982 | Hatch Valley (4) | Pojoaque (2) | Del Norte | | | |
| 1981 | Santa Rosa | St. Pius X (6) | Mayfield | | | |
| 1980 | Hatch Valley (3) | Deming | Sandia (4) | | | |
| 1979 | Hatch Valley (2) | St. Pius X (5) | Sandia (3) | | | |
| 1978 | Hatch Valley | West Las Vegas (2) | Los Alamos (2) | | | |
| 1977 | Jal (2) | St. Pius X (4) | Santa Fe | | | |
| 1976 | Albuquerque Indian | Artesia | Manzano (2) | | | |
| 1975 | Eunice (13) | Gadsden (5) | Alamogordo (2) | | | |
| 1974 | Eunice (12) | Cobre (2) | Sandia (2) | | | |
| 1973 | Pojoaque | Lovington | Carlsbad (3) | | | |
| 1972 | Eunice (11) | Los Lunas (3) | Carlsbad (2) | | | |
| 1971 | Eunice (10) | Cobre | Alamogordo | | | |
| 1970 | Eunice (9) | Los Lunas (2) | Farmington (2) | | | |
| Year | B | A | AA | | | |
| 1969 | Eunice (8) | Goddard | Farmington | | | |
| 1968 | Eunice (7) | West Las Vegas | Sandia | | | |
| 1967 | Eunice (6) | Gadsden (4) | Manzano | | | |
| 1966 | San Jon | Los Alamos | Roswell (3) | | | |
| 1965 | Eunice (5) | St. Pius X (3) | Valley | | | |
| 1964 | Eunice (4) | St. Pius X (2) | Roswell (2) | | | |
| 1963 | Eunice (3) | St. Pius X | Las Cruces (5) | | | |
| Year | B | A | | | | |
| 1962 | Eunice (2) | Las Cruces (4) | | | | |
| 1961 | Jal | Las Cruces (3) | | | | |
| 1960 | Eunice | Roswell | | | | |
| 1959 | Hot Springs (2) | Highland (2) | | | | |
| 1958 | Hatch | Carlsbad | | | | |
| 1957 | Santa Fe Indian School | Las Cruces (2) | | | | |
| 1956 | Bernalillo | Gadsden (3) | | | | |
| 1955 | Los Lunas | Gadsden (2) | | | | |
| 1954 | Hot Springs | Gadsden | | | | |
| Year | Single Class | | | | | |
| 1953 | Gallup | | | | | |
| 1952 | Las Cruces | | | | | |
| 1951 | Highland | | | | | |
| 1950 | Albuquerque High (10) | | | | | |
| 1949 | St. Mary's | | | | | |
| 1948 | Albuquerque High (9) | | | | | |
| 1947 | Albuquerque High (8) | | | | | |
| 1946 | Albuquerque High (7) | | | | | |
| 1945 | Albuquerque High (6) | | | | | |
| 1944 | Albuquerque High (5) | | | | | |
| 1943 | Albuquerque High (4) | | | | | |
| 1942 | Albuquerque High (3) | | | | | |
| 1941 | Albuquerque High (2) | | | | | |
| 1940 | Albuquerque High | | | | | |

=== Boys' Golf ===
| Year | A-AAA | AAAA | A-AAAA | AAAAA | AAAAAA |
|---|---|---|---|---|---|
| 2026 | Mesilla Valley | Artesia | | La Cueva | |
| 2025 | Mesilla Valley | ABQ Academy | | Volcano Vista | |
| 2024 | Mesilla Valley | ABQ Academy | | Volcano Vista | |
| 2023 | Mesilla Valley | Deming | | La Cueva | |
| 2022 | Mesilla Valley | ABQ Academy | | Deming | |
| 2021 | Clovis Christian | ABQ Academy | | Hobbs | |
| 2019 | Socorro | Los Alamos | | Piedra Vista | |
| 2018 | | | Portales | Los Alamos | Piedra Vista |
| 2017 | | | Hope Christian & Portales | Artesia | V. Sue Cleveland |
| 2016 | | | Socorro | St. Pius X | La Cueva |
| 2015 | | | Hope Christian | Albuquerque Academy | V. Sue Cleveland |
| 2014 | Hope Christian | Albuquerque Academy | | V. Sue Cleveland | |
| 2013 | Hope Christian | Goddard | | Oñate | |
| 2012 | Hope Christian | Deming | | Hobbs | |
| 2011 | Lovington | Goddard | | La Cueva | |
| 2010 | St. Michael's | Goddard | | La Cueva | |
| 2009 | St. Michael's | Albuquerque Academy | | Sandia | |
| 2008 | Lovington | Albuquerque Academy | | La Cueva | |
| 2007 | Lovington | Artesia | | Rio Rancho | |
| 2006 | Socorro | Los Alamos | | Mayfield | |
| 2005 | Mesilla Valley | Los Alamos | | Rio Rancho | |
| 2004 | NMMI | Los Alamos | | La Cueva | |
| 2003 | Hot Springs | Albuquerque Academy | | La Cueva | |
| 2002 | NMMI | Artesia | | La Cueva | |
| 2001 | Ruidoso | Goddard | | La Cueva | |
| 2000 | Ruidoso | La Cueva | | | |
| 1999 | Ruidoso | Farmington | | | |
| 1998 | Artesia | Carlsbad | | | |
| 1997 | Albuquerque Academy | Goddard | | | |
| 1996 | Los Alamos | Carlsbad | | | |
| 1995 | Lovington | Farmington | | | |
| 1994 | Grants | Cibola | | | |
| 1993 | Ruidoso | Clovis | | | |
| 1992 | Lovington | Clovis | | | |
| 1991 | Goddard | Cibola | | | |
| 1990 | Albuquerque Academy | Cibola | | | |
| 1989 | Goddard | Mayfield | | | |
| 1988 | Goddard | Hobbs | | | |
| 1987 | Belen | Hobbs | | | |
| 1986 | Goddard | Mayfield | | | |
| 1985 | Belen | Farmington | | | |
| 1984 | Lovington | Carlsbad | | | |
| 1983 | Socorro | Gadsden | | | |
| 1982 | Socorro | Belen | | | |
| 1981 | St. Pius X | Belen | | | |
| 1980 | Deming | Manzano | | | |
| 1979 | Socorro | Highland | | | |
| 1978 | Socorro | Albuquerque High | | | |
| 1977 | Socorro | Sandia | | | |
| 1976 | NMMI | Santa Fe | | | |
| 1975 | Albuquerque Academy | Sandia | | | |
| 1974 | Gadsden | Goddard | | | |
| 1973 | Socorro | Goddard | | | |
| 1972 | Socorro | Alamogordo | | | |
| 1971 | Jal | Alamogordo | | | |
| 1970 | Socorro | Hobbs | | | |
| | A/B | AA | | | |
| 1969 | Goddard | Los Alamos | | | |
| 1968 | Socorro | Sandia | | | |
| 1967 | Socorro | Highland | | | |
| 1966 | Socorro | Sandia | | | |
| 1965 | Jal | Alamogordo | | | |
| 1964 | NMMI | Highland | | | |
| 1963 | Albuquerque High | | | | |
| 1962 | Socorro | | | | |
| 1961 | Hobbs | | | | |
| 1960 | Highland | | | | |
| 1959 | Albuquerque High | | | | |
| 1958 | Albuquerque High | Las Cruces High School | Alfonso H. Cabrera | | |
| 1957 | Hobbs | | | | |
| 1956 | Highland | | | | |
| 1955 | Highland | | | | |
| 1954 | Highland | | | | |
| 1953 | Highland | | | | |
| 1952 | Highland | | | | |
| 1951 | Highland | | | | |

=== Girls' Golf ===
| Year | A-AAA | AAAA | A-AAAA | AAAAA | AAAAAA |
|---|---|---|---|---|---|
| 2026 | Socorro | ABQ Academy | | Organ Mountain | |
| 2025 | Socorro | ABQ Academy | | Piedra Vista | |
| 2024 | Texico | ABQ Academy | | Piedra Vista | |
| 2023 | Socorro | ABQ Academy | | La Cueva | |
| 2022 | Socorro | ABQ Academy | | Centennial | |
| 2021 | Socorro | ABQ Academy | | Piedra Vista | |
| 2019 | Mesilla Valley | Los Alamos | | Cleveland | |
| 2018 | | | St. Michael's | St. Pius X | La Cueva |
| 2017 | | | St. Michael's | Artesia | La Cueva |
| 2016 | | | Silver | Artesia | Cleveland |
| 2015 | | | Socorro | ABQ Academy | Deming |
| 2014 | | | Socorro | Albuquerque Academy | Deming |
| 2014 | Bosque | Deming | | La Cueva | |
| 2013 | Socorro | Deming | | La Cueva | |
| 2012 | Socorro | Deming | | Sandia | |
| 2011 | Socorro | Deming | | La Cueva | |
| 2010 | Socorro | Deming | | Sandia | |
| 2009 | Socorro | Deming | | Sandia | |
| 2008 | Socorro | Piedra Vista | | Sandia | |
| 2007 | Socorro | Los Alamos | | La Cueva | |
| 2006 | St. Michael's | Goddard | | Sandia | |
| 2005 | St. Michael's | Goddard | | Carlsbad | |
| 2004 | St. Michael's | Piedra Vista | | Sandia | |
| 2003 | Ruidoso | Goddard | | Alamogordo | |
| 2002 | Shiprock | Goddard | | Alamogordo | |
| 2001 | Shiprock | Goddard | | Alamogordo | |
| 2000 | Kirtland Central | Goddard | | | |
| 1999 | West Las Vegas | Goddard | | | |
| 1998 | Portales | Goddard | | | |
| 1997 | Socorro | Goddard | | | |
| 1996 | West Las Vegas | Alamogordo | | | |
| 1995 | Albuquerque Academy | Goddard | | | |
| 1994 | Portales | Goddard | | | |
| 1993 | Albuquerque Academy | Goddard | | | |
| 1992 | Goddard | Carlsbad | | | |
| 1991 | Goddard | Mayfield | | | |
| 1990 | Goddard | Mayfield | | | |
| 1989 | Lovington | La Cueva | | | |
| 1988 | Goddard | | | | |
| 1987 | Goddard | | | | |
| 1986 | Belen | | | | |
| 1985 | Santa Fe | | | | |
| 1984 | Los Alamos | | | | |
| 1983 | Socorro | | | | |
| 1982 | Socorro | | | | |
| 1981 | Socorro | | | | |
| 1980 | Socorro | | | | |
| 1979 | Albuquerque High | | | | |
| 1978 | Socorro | | | | |
| 1977 | Socorro | | | | |
| 1976 | Socorro | | | | |
| 1975 | Socorro | | | | |
| 1974 | Socorro | | | | |
| 1973 | Socorro | | | | |

=== Softball ===
| Year | Girls' A-AA | Girls' AAA | Girls' A-AAA | Girls' AAAA | Girls' AAAAA | Girls' AAAAAA |
|---|---|---|---|---|---|---|
| 2026 | Loving | West Las Vegas | | Artesia | Mayfield | |
| 2025 | Loving | Cobre | | Silver | Centennial | |
| 2024 | Loving | West Las Vegas | | Gallup | Centennial | |
| 2023 | Loving | Robertson | | Silver | Carlsbad | |
| 2022 | Loving | Robertson | | Gallup | Carlsbad | |
| 2021 | Tularosa | Dexter | | Artesia | Cleveland | |
| 2019 | Loving | Cobre | | Artesia | Rio Rancho | |
| 2018 | | | Dexter | Silver | Artesia | Rio Rancho |
| 2017 | | | Dexter | Silver | Aztec | La Cueva |
| 2016 | | | Dexter | Silver | Centennial | Oñate |
| 2015 | | | Dexter | Silver | Valencia | Rio Rancho |
| 2014 | Loving | Silver | | Piedra Vista | Rio Rancho | |
| 2013 | Loving | Silver | | Piedra Vista | Las Cruces | |
| 2012 | Loving | Silver | | Piedra Vista | Volcano Vista | |
| 2011 | Jal | Silver | | Piedra Vista | Volcano Vista | |
| 2010 | Jal | Silver | | Piedra Vista | Carlsbad | |
| 2009 | Loving | Bloomfield | | Piedra Vista | Cibola | |
| 2008 | Jal | St. Michael's | | Piedra Vista | Cibola | |
| 2007 | Loving | Bloomfield | | Piedra Vista | Cibola | |
| 2006 | Laguna Acoma | Grants | | Piedra Vista | West Mesa | |
| 2005 | Loving | Grants | | Aztec | La Cueva | |
| 2004 | Jal | Grants | | Farmington | Alamogordo | |
| 2003 | Loving | Bernalillo | | Farmington | Rio Rancho | |
| 2002 | McCurdy | Lovington | | Farmington | Carlsbad | |
| 2001 | Jal | Lovington | | Artesia | Carlsbad | |
| 2000 | Jal | Bloomfield | | Farmington | | |
| 1999 | Loving | Artesia | | Alamogordo | | |
| 1998 | Jal | Silver | | Farmington | | |
| 1997 | Jal | Silver | | Farmington | | |
| 1996 | Hope Christian | Silver | | Carlsbad | | |
| 1995 | Loving | Artesia | | Farmington | | |
| 1994 | Loving | Silver | | Farmington | | |
| 1993 | Loving | Bloomfield | | Carlsbad | | |
| 1992 | Loving | Bloomfield | | Carlsbad | | |
| 1991 | Loving | Bloomfield | | Carlsbad | | |
| 1990 | Loving | Cobre | | Carlsbad | | |
| 1989 | Loving | Cobre | | Del Norte | | |
| 1988 | Hatch Valley | Artesia | | Carlsbad | | |
| 1987 | Hatch Valley | Cobre | | Carlsbad | | |
| 1986 | Hatch Valley | St. Pius X | | Hobbs | | |
| 1985 | Hatch Valley | Cobre | | Carlsbad | | |
| 1984 | Laguna-Acoma | Cobre | | Del Norte | | |
| 1983 | Hatch Valley | Cobre | | Carlsbad | | |
| 1982 | Hatch Valley | Cobre | | Carlsbad | | |
| 1981 | Hatch Valley | Cobre | | Highland | | |
| 1980 | Cobre | | | | Carlsbad | |
| 1979 | Cobre | | | | Manzano | |
| 1978 | Sandia | | | | | |
| 1977 | Carlsbad | | | | | |
| 1976 | Carlsbad | | | | | |

=== Boys' Tennis ===
| Year | A-AAA | AAAA | A-AAAA | AAAAA | AAAAAA |
|---|---|---|---|---|---|
| 2026 | | | Albuquerque Academy | La Cueva | |
| 2025 | | | Albuquerque Academy | La Cueva | |
| 2024 | | | Albuquerque Academy | La Cueva | |
| 2023 | | | Albuquerque Academy | La Cueva | |
| 2022 | | | Albuquerque Academy | La Cueva | |
| 2021 | | | Albuquerque Academy | La Cueva | |
| 2019 | | | Albuquerque Academy | La Cueva | |
| 2018 | | | NMMI | Albuquerque Academy | Eldorado |
| 2017 | | | Robertson | Albuquerque Academy | La Cueva |
| 2016 | | | Bosque | Albuquerque Academy | La Cueva |
| 2015 | | | Robertson | Albuquerque Academy | La Cueva |
| 2014 | NMMI | Albuquerque Academy | | La Cueva | |
| 2013 | NMMI | Albuquerque Academy | | Sandia | |
| 2012 | NMMI | Albuquerque Academy | | Carlsbad | |
| 2011 | NMMI | Albuquerque Academy | | La Cueva | |
| 2010 | Sandia Prep | Albuquerque Academy | | Mayfield | |
| 2009 | Sandia Prep | Albuquerque Academy | | La Cueva | |
| 2008 | NMMI | Albuquerque Academy | | La Cueva | |
| 2007 | Robertson | Albuquerque Academy | | La Cueva | |
| 2006 | Robertson | Albuquerque Academy | | La Cueva | |
| 2005 | NMMI | Albuquerque Academy | | La Cueva | |
| 2004 | NMMI | Albuquerque Academy | | La Cueva | |
| 2003 | Robertson | Albuquerque Academy | | La Cueva | |
| 2002 | NMMI | St. Pius X | | La Cueva | |
| 2001 | NMMI | Albuquerque Academy | | La Cueva | |
| 2000 | Albuquerque Academy | Albuquerque High | | | |
| 1999 | Albuquerque Academy | Carlsbad | | | |
| 1998 | Albuquerque Academy | Carlsbad | | | |
| 1997 | NMMI | Albuquerque High | | | |
| 1996 | NMMI | Las Cruces | | | |
| 1995 | Albuquerque Academy | Las Cruces | | | |
| 1994 | Belen | Carlsbad | | | |
| 1993 | Albuquerque Academy | Carlsbad | | | |

=== Girls' Tennis ===
| Year | A-AAA | AAAA | A-AAAA | AAAAA | AAAAAA |
|---|---|---|---|---|---|
| 2026 | | | Albuquerque Academy | Farmington | |
| 2025 | | | Albuquerque Academy | Farmington | |
| 2024 | | | Albuquerque Academy | La Cueva | |
| 2023 | | | Albuquerque Academy | La Cueva | |
| 2022 | | | Albuquerque Academy | La Cueva | |
| 2021 | | | Albuquerque Academy | La Cueva | |
| 2019 | | | Albuquerque Academy | Sandia | |
| 2018 | | | Robertson | Farmington | Eldorado |
| 2017 | | | Robertson | Los Alamos | Eldorado |
| 2016 | | | Robertson | Albuquerque Academy | Albuquerque |
| 2015 | | | Robertson | Farmington | Albuquerque |
| 2014 | Robertson | Farmington | | Mayfield | |
| 2013 | Bosque | Los Alamos | | Eldorado | |
| 2012 | St Michael's | Farmington | | Mayfield | |
| 2011 | Robertson | Farmington | | Valley | |
| 2010 | Bosque | Farmington | | Carlsbad | |
| 2009 | Sandia Prep | Farmington | | Carlsbad | |
| 2008 | Bosque | Los Alamos | | Carlsbad | |
| 2007 | Bosque | Los Alamos | | Carlsbad | |
| 2006 | Bosque | Albuquerque Academy | | Carlsbad | |
| 2005 | Sandia Prep | Albuquerque Academy | | Sandia | |
| 2004 | Portales | Los Alamos | | Sandia | |
| 2003 | Portales | Los Alamos | | Sandia | |
| 2002 | Sandia Prep | Los Alamos | | Sandia | |
| 2001 | Portales | Los Alamos | | Hobbs | |
| 2000 | Los Alamos | Hobbs | | | |
| 1999 | St. Pius X | Hobbs | | | |
| 1998 | Albuquerque Academy | La Cueva | | | |
| 1997 | Albuquerque Academy | Las Cruces / Santa Fe (tie) | | | |
| 1996 | Albuquerque Academy | Las Cruces | | | |
| 1995 | Albuquerque Academy | Santa Fe | | | |
| 1994 | Albuquerque Academy | Santa Fe | | | |
| 1993 | Portales | Carlsbad | | | |

=== Small Team Tennis ===
| Year | Small team |
|---|---|
| 2010 | Moriarty |
| 2009 | West Las Vegas |

=== Boys' Track and Field ===
| Year | B | A | AA | AAA | AAAA | AAAAA | AAAAAA |
|---|---|---|---|---|---|---|---|
| 2026 | | Melrose | Menaul | St. Michael's | Albuquerque Academy | V. Sue Cleveland | |
| 2025 | | Logan | Texico | St. Michael's | Albuquerque Academy | V. Sue Cleveland | |
| 2024 | | Logan | Hagerman | St. Michael's | Los Alamos | V. Sue Cleveland | |
| 2023 | | Logan | Santa Rosa | St. Michael's | Los Alamos | V. Sue Cleveland | |
| 2022 | | Magdalena | Hagerman | St. Michael's | Los Alamos | V. Sue Cleveland | |
| 2021 | | Magdalena | Hagerman | St. Michael's | Los Alamos | V. Sue Cleveland | |
| 2020 | | Season cancelled | | | | | |
| 2019 | | Fort Sumner | Santa Rosa | St. Michael's | Albuquerque Academy | V. Sue Cleveland | |
| 2018 | | Reserve | Fort Sumner | Dexter | Taos | Albuquerque Academy | V. Sue Cleveland |
| 2017 | | Melrose | Hagerman | Tucumcari | Taos | Albuquerque Academy | V. Sue Cleveland |
| 2016 | | Reserve | Logan | Pecos | Taos | Albuquerque Academy | V. Sue Cleveland |
| 2015 | | Cimarron | Logan / Magdelena (tie) | Clayton | Taos | Albuquerque Academy | Volcano Vista |
| 2014 | | Cimarron | Clayton / Santa Rosa (tie) | Taos | Farmington | V. Sue Cleveland | |
| 2013 | | Cimarron | Texico | Silver | Piedra Vista | V. Sue Cleveland | |
| 2012 | | Fort Sumner | Lordsburg | Silver | Albuquerque Academy | V. Sue Cleveland | |
| 2011 | | Cliff | Lordsburg | Lovington | Artesia | La Cueva | |
| 2010 | | Fort Sumner | Texico | Lovington | Albuquerque Academy | Cibola | |
| 2009 | | Fort Sumner | Hagerman | Lovington | Albuquerque Academy | Highland | |
| 2008 | | Hagerman | Tucumcari | Hope Christian | Los Alamos | Cibola | |
| 2007 | | Carrizozo | Estancia | Ruidoso | Albuquerque Academy | Alamogordo | |
| 2006 | | Hagerman | Estancia | Lovington | Albuquerque Academy | La Cueva | |
| 2005 | | Fort Sumner | Loving | Lovington | Albuquerque Academy | Highland | |
| 2004 | | Fort Sumner | Loving | Lovington | Albuquerque Academy | La Cueva | |
| 2003 | | Fort Sumner | Hope Christian | Lovington | Albuquerque Academy | La Cueva | |
| 2002 | | Tatum | Cimarron | Grants | Albuquerque Academy | La Cueva | |
| 2001 | | Logan | Estancia | NMMI | Kirtland Central | La Cueva | |
| 2000 | | Hagerman | Fort Sumner | Ruidoso | La Cueva | | |
| 1999 | | Cliff | Fort Sumner | Albuquerque Academy / Artesia (tie) | La Cueva | | |
| 1998 | | Hagerman | Texico | Artesia | La Cueva | | |
| 1997 | | Hagerman | Eunice | Artesia | La Cueva | | |
| 1996 | | Fort Sumner | Lordsburg | Albuquerque Academy | Alamogordo | | |
| 1995 | | Cimarron | Santa Rosa | Los Alamos | Alamogordo | | |
| 1994 | | Springer | Eunice | Bloomfield | Alamogordo | | |
| 1993 | | Loving | Clayton | Bloomfield | Alamogordo | | |
| 1992 | | Carrizozo | Menaul | Belen | Hobbs | | |
| 1991 | | Hagerman | Jal | Albuquerque Academy | Highland | | |
| 1990 | | Hagerman | Jal | Grants | Del Norte | | |
| 1989 | | Hagerman | Clayton | Bloomfield | Highland | | |
| 1988 | | Springer | Clayton | Bloomfield | Highland | | |
| 1987 | | Capitan | Clayton | Lovington | Mayfield | | |
| 1986 | | Hagerman | Clayton | Grants | West Mesa | | |
| 1985 | | Tatum | Lordsburg | Lovington | Alamogordo | | |
| 1984 | | Tatum | Estanica | Lovington | Hobbs | | |
| 1983 | | Capitan | Moriarty | Tucumcari | Hobbs | | |
| 1982 | | Cliff | Clayton | Lovington | Highland | | |
| 1981 | | Cliff | Jal | Lovington | Highland | | |
| 1980 | | Tatum | Estancia | Lovington | Carlsbad / Hobbs (tie) | | |
| 1979 | | Tatum | Estancia | Tucumcari | Highland | | |
| 1978 | | Tatum | Lordsburg | Lovington | Carlsbad | | |
| 1977 | | Hagerman | Laguna-Acoma | Lovington | Sandia | | |
| 1976 | | Melrose | Jal | Artesia | Sandia | | |
| 1975 | | Hagerman | Jal | Silver | Manzano | | |
| 1974 | | Hagerman | Jal | Gadsden | Hobbs | | |
| 1973 | | Hagerman | Hot Springs | Cobre | Hobbs | | |
| 1972 | | Jal | Robertson | Hobbs | | | |
| 1971 | | Jal | Silver | Highland | | | |
| 1970 | | Jal | Lovington | Highland | | | |
| 1969 | Eunice | Lovington | Del Norte | | | | |
| 1968 | Jal | NMMI | Highland | | | | |
| 1967 | Jal | NMMI | Del Norte | | | | |
| 1966 | Jal | Lovington | Hobbs | | | | |
| 1965 | Jal | Los Alamos | Hobbs | | | | |
| 1964 | Hot Springs | Gadsden | Highland | | | | |
| 1963 | Tatum | NMMI | Highland | | | | |
| 1962 | Fort Sumner | Las Cruces | | | | | |
| 1961 | Fort Sumner | Highland | | | | | |
| 1960 | Fort Sumner | Albuquerque High | | | | | |
| 1959 | Fort Sumner | Highland | | | | | |
| 1958 | Fort Sumner | Highland | | | | | |
| 1957 | Fort Sumner | Highland | | | | | |
| 1956 | Fort Sumner | Highland | | | | | |
| 1955 | Fort Sumner | Highland | | | | | |
| 1954 | Eunice | Highland | | | | | |
| 1953 | Highland | | | | | | |
| 1952 | Highland | | | | | | |
| 1951 | Alamogordo | | | | | | |
| 1950 | Albuquerque High | | | | | | |
| 1949 | Carlsbad | | | | | | |
| 1948 | Albuquerque High | | | | | | |
| 1947 | Carlsbad | | | | | | |
| 1946 | Albuquerque High | | | | | | |
| 1945 | Albuquerque High | | | | | | |
| 1944 | Albuquerque High | | | | | | |
| 1943 | Albuquerque High | | | | | | |
| 1942 | Menaul | | | | | | |
| 1941 | Albuquerque High | | | | | | |
| 1940 | Albuquerque High | | | | | | |
| 1939 | Hobbs | | | | | | |
| 1938 | Hobbs | | | | | | |
| 1937 | Albuquerque High | | | | | | |
| 1936 | Albuquerque High | | | | | | |
| 1935 | Floyd | | | | | | |
| 1934 | Albuquerque High | | | | | | |
| 1933 | Carlsbad | | | | | | |
| 1932 | Carlsbad | | | | | | |
| 1931 | Carlsbad | | | | | | |
| 1930 | Carlsbad | | | | | | |
| 1929 | Grenville | Springer | | | | | |
| 1928 | Menaul | Albuquerque Indian | | | | | |
| 1927 | Tucumcari | | | | | | |
| 1926 | Tucumcari | | | | | | |
| 1925 | Albuquerque High | | | | | | |
| 1924 | Taos | | | | | | |
| 1923 | Albuquerque High | | | | | | |
| 1922 | Albuquerque High | | | | | | |
| 1921 | Albuquerque High | | | | | | |
| 1920 | Albuquerque High | | | | | | |
| 1919 | Roswell | | | | | | |
| 1918 | Roswell | | | | | | |
| 1917 | Albuquerque High | | | | | | |
| 1916 | Albuquerque High | | | | | | |
| 1915 | Roswell | | | | | | |
| 1914 | Roswell | | | | | | |
| 1913 | Albuquerque High | | | | | | |

=== Girls' Track and Field ===
| Year | A | AA | AAA | AAAA | AAAAA | AAAAAA |
|---|---|---|---|---|---|---|
| 2026 | Logan | Legacy Academy | St. Michael's | ABQ Academy | Rio Rancho | |
| 2025 | Fort Sumner | Texico | St. Michael's | Los Alamos | Rio Rancho | |
| 2024 | Legacy Academy | ATC | St. Michael's | Los Alamos | Eldorado / Rio Rancho (tie) | |
| 2023 | Melrose | Santa Rosa | St. Michael's | Los Alamos | La Cueva | |
| 2022 | Melrose | ATC | St. Michael's | Los Alamos | Alamogordo | |
| 2021 | Logan | Rehoboth Christian | St. Michael's | Los Alamos | Alamogordo | |
| 2019 | Logan | Cloudcroft | Sandia Prep | ABQ Academy | La Cueva | |
| 2018 | Melrose | Cloudcroft | Santa Fe Prep | Taos | ABQ Academy | La Cueva |
| 2017 | Melrose | Cloudcroft / Logan (tie) | Eunice | Hope Christian | Alamogordo | V. Sue Cleveland |
| 2016 | Elida | Fort Sumner | Eunice | Hope Christian | Piedra Vista | V. Sue Cleveland |
| 2015 | Cimarron | Fort Sumner | Santa Fe Prep | Ruidoso | Aztec | V. Sue Cleveland |
| 2014 | Fort Sumner | Estancia | Taos | Aztec | Eldorado | |
| 2013 | Fort Sumner | Santa Rosa | Taos | Aztec | La Cueva | |
| 2012 | Fort Sumner | Cuba | Hope Christian | Los Alamos | V. Sue Cleveland | |
| 2011 | Fort Sumner | Santa Fe Prep | Hope Christian | Los Alamos | La Cueva | |
| 2010 | Fort Sumner | Estancia | Hope Christian | Los Alamos | Highland | |
| 2009 | Fort Sumner | Texico | Pojoaque | Los Alamos | Clovis | |
| 2008 | Fort Sumner | Cloudcroft | Ruidoso | Albuquerque Academy | Clovis | |
| 2007 | Fort Sumner | Cloudcroft | St. Michael's | Albuquerque Academy | La Cueva | |
| 2006 | Cimarron | Santa Fe Prep | St. Michael's | Albuquerque Academy | Clovis | |
| 2005 | Cimarron | Hope Christian | St. Michael's | Albuquerque Academy | La Cueva | |
| 2004 | Fort Sumner | Hope Christian | St. Michael's | Farmington | La Cueva | |
| 2003 | Carrizozo | Tucumcari | Grants | Los Alamos | Cibola | |
| 2002 | Carrizozo | Tucumcari | Grants | Albuquerque Academy | Eldorado | |
| 2001 | Carrizozo | Fort Sumner | Lovington | Moriarty | Eldorado / Manzano (tie) | |
| 2000 | Loving | Fort Sumner | Lovington | La Cueva | | |
| 1999 | Floyd | Sandia Prep | Moriarty | Clovis | | |
| 1998 | Fort Sumner | Sandia Prep | Silver | Clovis | | |
| 1997 | Fort Sumner | Cimarron | Bloomfield | Hobbs | | |
| 1996 | Fort Sumner | Santa Rosa | Lovington | Clovis | | |
| 1995 | Cimarron | Santa Rosa | Los Alamos | Manzano | | |
| 1994 | Cimarron | Hot Springs | Deming | Clovis | | |
| 1993 | Roy | Hot Springs | Albuquerque Academy | Clovis | | |
| 1992 | Cimarron | Hot Springs | Onate | Eldorado | | |
| 1991 | Capitan | Hot Springs | Onate | Clovis | | |
| 1990 | Capitan | Clayton | Onate | Alamogordo | | |
| 1989 | Capitan | Clayton | Lovington | Roswell | | |
| 1988 | Tatum | Clayton | Lovington | Clovis | | |
| 1987 | Tatum | Clayton | Robertson | Clovis | | |
| 1986 | Tatum | Clayton | Silver | Eldorado | | |
| 1985 | Tatum | Jal | Lovington | Eldorado | | |
| 1984 | Tatum | Clayton | Lovington | Manzano | | |
| 1983 | Tatum | Jal | Lovington | Manzano | | |
| 1982 | Melrose | Jal | Socorro | Alamogordo | | |
| 1981 | Melrose | Clayton | Socorro | Hobbs | | |
| 1980 | Tatum | Clayton | Los Lunas | Highland | | |
| 1979 | Texico | Clayton | Lovington | Hobbs | | |
| 1978 | Tatum | Clayton | Lovington | Manzano | | |
| 1977 | Tatum | Clayton | Belen | Manzano | | |
| 1976 | Clayton | Del Norte | | | | |
| 1975 | Estancia | Clovis | | | | |
| 1974 | Portales | | | | | |
| 1973 | Texico | | | | | |

== Activities (non-sports) ==
=== Marching Band ===
| Year | A-AAAA | AAAAA |
|---|---|---|
| 2026 | Los Alamos | Cleveland |
| 2025 | Los Alamos | Cleveland |
| 2024 | Goddard | Rio Rancho |

=== Concert Band ===
| Year | A-AA | AAA | A-AAA | AAAA | AAAAA | AAAAAA |
|---|---|---|---|---|---|---|
| 2026 | | | Rehoboth Christian (3) | Valencia (5) | Cleveland (3) | |
| 2025 | | | Cimarron (13) | Valencia (4) | La Cueva (6) | |
| 2024 | | | Rehoboth Christian (2) | Santa Teresa (2) | Cleveland (2) | |
| 2023 | | | Cimarron (12) | Santa Teresa (1) | Volcano Vista (1) | |
| 2022 | | | Cimarron (11) | Valencia (3) | Cleveland (1) | |
| 2020- 2021 | | | Cancelled | | | |
| 2019 | | | Cimarron (10) | Valencia (2) | La Cueva (5) | |
| 2018 | | | Cimarron (9) | Silver (2) | Artesia (1) | La Cueva (4) |
| 2017 | | | Cloudcroft (1) | Silver (1) | Deming (7) | La Cueva (3) |
| 2016 | | | Rehoboth Christian (1) | Cobre (9) | Centennial (1) | Deming (7) |
| 2015 | | | Cimarron (8) | Cobre (8) | Valencia (1) | Deming (6) |
| 2014 | Cimarron (7) | Cobre (7) | | Deming (5) | Clovis (1) | |
| 2013 | Capitan (1) | Cobre (6) | | Deming (4) | Eldorado (2) | |
| 2012 | Cimarron (6) | Cobre (5) | | Deming (3) | Sandia (1) | |
| 2011 | Cimarron (5) | Cobre (4) | | Los Alamos (2) | La Cueva (2) | |
| 2010 | Cimarron (4) | Cobre (3) | | Deming (2) | La Cueva (1) | |
| 2009 | Cimarron (3) | St. Michael's (1) | | Los Alamos (1) | Onate (Organ Mountain) (1) | |
| 2008 | Cimarron (2) | Cobre (2) | | Deming (1) | Eldorado (1) | |
| 2007 | Cimarron (1) | Cobre (1) | | Kirtland Central (1) | Cibola (1) | |

=== Choir ===
| Year | A-AA | AAA | A-AAA | AAAA | AAAAA | AAAAA | A-AAAAA Treble |
|---|---|---|---|---|---|---|---|
| 2026 | | | New Mexico School for the Arts | Los Alamos | Clovis | | Clovis |
| 2025 | | | Public Academy for Performing Arts | Moriarty | Centennial | | Moriarty |
| 2024 | | | St. Michael’s | Portales | Portales | | Piedra Vista |
| 2023 | | | St. Michael’s | Portales | Clovis | | Public Academy for Performing Arts |
| 2022 | | | New Mexico School for the Arts | Portales | Piedra Vista | | Public Academy for Performing Arts |
| 2020-21 | | | Cancelled | | | | Cancelled |
| 2019 | | | St. Michael’s | Portales | Piedra Vista | | Clovis HS & Volcano Vista HS** |
| 2018 | | | Capitan | Portales | Artesia | Piedra Vista & Rio Rancho * | Farmington |
| 2017 | | | New Mexico School for the Arts | St. Micheals | Los Alamos | La Cueva | La Cueva |
| 2016 | | | New Mexico School for the Arts | Portales | Piedra Vista | Rio Rancho | |
| 2015 | | | New Mexico School for the Arts | | Los Alamos | La Cueva | |
| 2014 | Victory Christian | Lovington | | Piedra Vista | La Cueva | | |
| 2013 | Victory Christian | New Mexico School for the Arts | | Piedra Vista | Carlsbad | | |
| 2012 | Cloudcroft | Sandia Prep | | Piedra Vista | Carlsbad | | |
| 2011 | Victory Christian | West Las Vegas | | Piedra Vista | Eldorado | | |
| 2010 | Victory Christian | Sandia Prep | | Piedra Vista | Eldorado | | |
| 2009 | Victory Christian | West Las Vegas | | Piedra Vista | Hobbs | | |
| 2008 | | West Las Vegas | | Piedra Vista | Manzano | | |

- * Both Piedra Vista and Rio Rancho tied with a score of 14.33
- ** Clovis and Volcano Vista tied with a score of 16.00

=== Athletic Training Challenge ===
| Year | School |
|---|---|
| 2026 | St. Pius X |
| 2025 | St. Pius X |
| 2024 | Alamogordo |
| 2023 | Gadsden |
| 2022 | Gadsden |
| 2021 | Gadsden |
| 2019 | Alamogordo |
| 2018 | Centennial |
| 2017 | Centennial |
| 2016 | Centennial |
| 2015 | Gadsden |
| 2014 | Centennial |
| 2013 | Rio Rancho |
| 2012 | Rio Rancho |
| 2011 | Rio Rancho |
| 2010 | Rio Rancho |
| 2009 | Rio Rancho |

=== Bowling ===
| Year | A-AAA | AAAA | A-AAAA | AAAAA | AAAAAA |
|---|---|---|---|---|---|
| 2026 | | Bernalillo | | Rio Rancho | |
| 2025 | | Valley | | Eldorado | |
| 2024 | East Mountain | Artesia | | Rio Rancho | |
| 2023 | East Mountain | Artesia | | V. Sue Cleveland | |
| 2022 | East Mountain | Espanola | | Sandia | |
| 2021 | | Artesia | | Rio Rancho | |
| 2020 | East Mountain | Artesia | | Rio Rancho | |
| 2019 | East Mountain | Artesia | | Rio Rancho | |
| 2018 | | | East Mountain | Artesia | Rio Rancho |
| 2017 | | | Pojoaque | Artesia | V. Sue Cleveland |
| 2016 | | | Pojoaque | Los Lunas | Rio Rancho |
| 2015 | | | East Mountain | Piedra Vista | V. Sue Cleveland |
| 2014 | East Mountain | Artesia | | Rio Rancho | |
| 2013 | Pojoaque | Piedra Vista | | Manzano | |
| 2012 | East Mountain | Artesia | | V. Sue Cleveland | |
| 2011 | Pojoaque | Santa Fe | | V. Sue Cleveland | |
| 2010 | East Mountain | Del Norte | | V. Sue Cleveland | |
| 2009 | East Mountain | Piedra Vista | | Rio Rancho | |
| 2008 | East Mountain | | | La Cueva | |

=== Chess ===
| Year | A-AA | AAA | A-AAA | AAAA-AAAAA | AAAA | AAAAA-AAAAAA |
|---|---|---|---|---|---|---|
| 2026 | | | AIMS | ABQ Academy | | |
| 2025 | | | AIMS | ABQ Academy | | |
| 2024 | | | AIMS | ABQ Academy | | |
| 2023 | | | AIMS | ABQ Academy | | |
| 2022 | | | AIMS | Los Alamos | | |
| 2021 | | | Arrowhead Park ECHS | ABQ Academy | | |
| 2020 | | | ATC | ABQ Academy | | |
| 2019 | | | AIMS | Los Alamos | | |
| 2018 | | | ATC | | Santa Fe Indian | Los Alamos |
| 2017 | | | AIMS | | Santa Fe Indian | Los Alamos |
| 2016 | | | Albuquerque Institute for Mathematics & Science (AIMS) | | St. Michael's | Los Alamos |
| 2015 | | | Albuquerque Institute for Mathematics & Science (AIMS) / Academy for Technology & the Classics (ATC) (tie) | | St. Michael's / Santa Fe Indian (tie) | Albuquerque Academy |
| 2014 | Albuquerque Institute for Mathematics & Science (AIMS) | St. Michael's | | Albuquerque Academy | | |
| 2013 | Bosque / Academy for Technology & the Classics (ATC) (tie) | Taos | | Albuquerque Academy | | |
| 2010 | Wagon Mound | | | Albuquerque Academy | | |
| 2009 | Bosque | | | Taos / Albuquerque Academy (tie) | | |
| 2008 | Santa Fe Prep | | | Taos | | |
| 2007 | Peñasco | | | Del Norte | | |

=== Esports ===
| Year | A | AA | AAA | A-AAA | AAAA | AAAAA |
|---|---|---|---|---|---|---|
| 2026 | Floyd | Rio Rancho Cyber Academy | Bosque | | Los Alamos | La Cueva |
| 2025 | Floyd | Hagerman | West Las Vegas | | Portales | La Cueva |
| 2024 | Wagon Mound | Early College Academy | West Las Vegas | | Silver | La Cueva |
| 2023 | Springer | Early College Academy | West Las Vegas | | Del Norte | Clovis |
| 2022 | | | | Early College Academy | Del Norte | Clovis |
| 2021 | | | | Early College Academy | Los Alamos | La Cueva |
| 2020 | CANCELLED | | | | | |
| 2019 | | | | Sandia Prep | Los Alamos | Rio Rancho |

=== JROTC ===
Physical Fitness
| Year | AAAA-AAAAA | AAAAA | AAAAAA |
|---|---|---|---|
| 2015 | | Los Alamos | La Cueva |
| 2014 | La Cueva | | |
| 2013 | La Cueva | | |

Drill
| Year | AAAA-AAAAA | AAAAA | AAAAAA |
|---|---|---|---|
| 2015 | | Los Alamos | Cibola |
| 2014 | Grants | | |
| 2013 | Grants | | |

Precision Rifle
| Year | AAAA-AAAAA | AAAAA | AAAAAA |
|---|---|---|---|
| 2015 | | Piedra Vista | Eldorado |
| 2014 | Volcano Vista | | |
| 2013 | Volcano Vista | | |

Sporter Rifle
| Year | AAAA-AAAAA | AAAAA | AAAAAA |
|---|---|---|---|
| 2015 | | Kirtland Central | Volcano Vista |
| 2014 | Piedra Vista | | |
| 2013 | Kirtland Central | | |

=== Orchestra (Defunct) ===
Symphony
| Year | A-AAAAAA |
|---|---|
| 2016 | Centennial |
| 2015 | Centennial |
| 2014 | Centennial |

String
| Year | A-AAAAA | AAAAAA |
|---|---|---|
| 2016 | New Mexico School for the Arts | La Cueva |
| 2015 | New Mexico School for the Arts | La Cueva |
| 2014 | La Cueva | |

== Team titles ==
=== Schools with most team titles ===
| Rank | No. of titles | School | City | No. of boys' titles | No. of girls' titles | First | Last |
|---|---|---|---|---|---|---|---|
| 1 | 147 | Albuquerque Academy | Albuquerque | 101 | 46 | 1968 | 2016 |
| 2 | 110 | La Cueva High School | Albuquerque | 63 | 46 | 1987 | 2016 |
| 3 | 99 | Los Alamos High School | Los Alamos | 39 | 60 | 1965 | 2015 |
| 4 | 82 | Eldorado High School | Albuquerque | 29 | 53 | 1975 | 2015 |
| 5 | 68 | Carlsbad High School | Carlsbad | 44 | 24 | 1930 | 2012 |
| 6 | 65 | St. Michael's High School | Santa Fe | 30 | 35 | 1940 | 2016 |
| 7 | 64 | Hope Christian School | Albuquerque | 27 | 37 | 1981 | 2016 |
| 7 | 64 | Highland High School | Albuquerque | 59 | 5 | 1951 | 2010 |
| 9 | 62 | Albuquerque High School | Albuquerque | 55 | 7 | 1921 | 2016 |
| 10 | 61 | Lovington High School | Lovington | 46 | 15 | 1949 | 2013 |
| 11 | 59 | St. Pius X High School | Albuquerque | 39 | 20 | 1963 | 2015 |
| 12 | 58 | Artesia High School | Artesia | 45 | 13 | 1957 | 2015 |
| 13 | 56 | Fort Sumner High School | Fort Sumner | 28 | 28 | 1955 | 2016 |
| 14 | 54 | Farmington High School | Farmington | 30 | 24 | 1952 | 2015 |
| 15 | 53 | Goddard High School | Roswell | 25 | 28 | 1967 | 2013 |
| 16 | 47 | Hobbs High School | Hobbs | 39 | 8 | 1938 | 2015 |
| 17 | 46 | Jal High School | Jal | 33 | 13 | 1959 | 2011 |
| 18 | 45 | Las Cruces High School | Las Cruces | 30 | 15 | 1941 | 2016 |
| 18 | 45 | Sandia High School | Albuquerque | 24 | 21 | 1960 | 2013 |
| 20 | 42 | Eunice High School | Eunice | 40 | 2 | 1954 | 2016 |
| 20 | 42 | Roswell High School | Roswell | 21 | 21 | 1926 | 2016 |
| 20 | 42 | Texico High School | Texico | 15 | 27 | 1973 | 2016 |
| 23 | 40 | Gallup High School | Gallup | 19 | 21 | 1953 | 2011 |

=== Schools with most team titles in one sport ===
| Rank | # of Titles | School | City | Sport | First | Last |
|---|---|---|---|---|---|---|
| 1 | 32 | Artesia | Artesia | Football | 1957 | 2023 |
| 2 | 23 | Albuquerque Academy | Albuquerque | Boys' Swimming and Diving | 1972 | 2016 |
| 2 | 23 | Laguna Acoma | Casa Blanca | Boys' Cross Country | 1969 | 2014 |
| 4 | 22 | Highland | Albuquerque | Boys' Track and Field | 1952 | 2009 |
| 5 | 20 | Albuquerque Academy | Albuquerque Academy | Boys' Tennis | 1993 | 2016 |
| 5 | 20 | Los Alamos | Los Alamos | Girls' Cross Country | 1981 | 2015 |
| 5 | 20 | Sandia Prep | Albuquerque | Boys' Soccer | 1981 | 2014 |
| 5 | 20 | Albuquerque | Albuquerque | Boys' Track and Field | 1913 | 1960 |
| 9 | 19 | Socorro | Socorro | Girls' Golf | 1973 | 2015 |
| 9 | 19 | Kirtland Central | Kirtland | Girls' Basketball | 1980 | 2012 |
| 11 | 18 | St. Michael's | Santa Fe | Spirit/Dance/Drill | 1978 | 2016 |
| 11 | 18 | Lovington | Lovington | Football | 1951 | 2011 |
| 11 | 18 | Lovington | Lovington | Boys' Track and Field | 1966 | 2011 |
| 11 | 18 | Gallup | Gallup | Boys' Cross Country | 1983 | 2007 |
| 11 | 18 | Los Alamos | Los Alamos | Boys' Swimming and Diving | 1956 | 2005 |
| 16 | 17 | Zuni | Zuni | Boys' Cross Country | 1968 | 2015 |
| 16 | 17 | Eunice | Eunice | Baseball | 1960 | 2015 |
| 16 | 17 | Hobbs | Hobbs | Boys' Basketball | 1956 | 2015 |
| 16 | 17 | Fort Sumner | Fort Sumner | Boys' Track and Field | 1955 | 2012 |
| 16 | 17 | Lovington | Lovington | Boys' Track and Field | 1966 | 2010 |
| 16 | 17 | St. Pius X | Albuquerque | Boys' Soccer | 1988 | 2008 |
| 16 | 17 | Goddard | Roswell | Girls' Golf | 1987 | 2006 |
| 23 | 16 | Fort Sumner | Fort Sumner | Girls' Track and Field | 1996 | 2016 |
| 23 | 16 | Albuquerque Academy | Albuquerque | Girls' Swimming and Diving | 1975 | 2012 |
| 23 | 16 | Carlsbad | Carlsbad | Softball | 1976 | 2010 |
| 23 | 16 | Aztec | Aztec | Wrestling | 1963 | 2002 |
| 27 | 15 | Valley | Albuquerque | Spirit/Dance/Drill | 1997 | 2016 |
| 27 | 15 | La Cueva | La Cueva | Girls' Soccer | 1989 | 2014 |
| 27 | 15 | Loving | Loving | Softball | 1989 | 2014 |
| 27 | 15 | Los Alamos | Los Alamos | Girls' Swimming and Diving | 1970 | 2004 |
