= Isaac Bawa =

Ghanaian footballer

Personal information
- Date of birth: 24 April 1997 (age 29)
- Place of birth: Accra, Ghana
- Height: 1.80 m (5 ft 11 in)
- Position: Defender

Youth career
- Wa Anokye Stars
- Rockets FC
- Wa Allstars

College career
Years	Team	Apps	(Gls)
2018–2019	Azusa Pacific Cougars	38	(2)

Senior career*
Years	Team	Apps	(Gls)
2019	Golden State Force	6	(0)
2020–2021	LA Galaxy II	31	(0)
2022	Union Omaha	14	(0)
2024	Union Omaha	5	(0)
- * Club domestic league appearances and goals as of November 25, 2024

Isaac Bawa (born 24 April 1997) is a retired Ghanaian professional footballer.

== Career ==
=== College and amateur ===
==== Azusa Pacific University ====
Bawa moved to the United States to play college soccer at Azusa Pacific in 2018, making 38 appearances, scoring 2 goals and tallying 1 assists in his two seasons with the Cougars.

==== FC Golden State Force ====
In 2019, Bawa appeared for USL League Two side FC Golden State Force.

=== Professional ===
==== LA Galaxy II ====
On 31 January 2020, Bawa signed for USL Championship side LA Galaxy II. Following the 2021 season, Bawa was released by the Galaxy.

==== Union Omaha ====
Bawa joined Union Omaha of USL League One in March 2022. He appeared in 14 matches for Omaha that season On 19 June 2024, it was announced that Bawa had re-signed with Omaha on a 25-day contract. Bawa announced his retirement from playing professional football in January 2025.
