= Gabriel Claudio =

American soccer player

Personal information
- Date of birth: October 25, 1999 (age 27)
- Place of birth: Yuma, Arizona, United States
- Height: 1.88 m (6 ft 2 in)
- Position: Defender

College career
Years	Team	Apps	(Gls)
2018–2019	Yavapai Roughriders	38	(12)
2020–2021	UNLV Rebels	29	(2)

Senior career*
Years	Team	Apps	(Gls)
2019	FC Golden State Force	0	(0)
2021	Laredo Heat	9	(2)
2022	Union Omaha	22	(0)
2023	One Knoxville	19	(1)
- * Club domestic league appearances and goals as of October 18, 2023

Gabriel Claudio (born October 25, 1999) is an American soccer player who plays as a defender.

== Career ==
=== Youth, College & Amateur ===
Claudio attended Cibola High School, where he helped the team finish third in the state tournament during his junior season. Claudio was a two-time first team all-state selection and claimed conference Player of the Year honors in 2017. He also spent two seasons on the football team, playing kicker, free safety, and wide receiver and earning City Player of the Year recognition as well as first team all-state honors in 2017 as a junior. He likewise set every major receiving and touchdown record in Yuma County history. He was also a first-team all-state selection on defense as a sophomore.

In 2017, Claudio attended Yavapai College to play college soccer. In two seasons with the Roughriders, Claudio made 38 appearances, scoring 12 goals and tallying six assists. Claduio helped Yavapai to a conference title in 2019 while earning Region Player of the Year Runner-Up honors, and was a first team All-NJCAA All-Region team selection.

In 2020, Claudio transferred to the University of Nevada, Las Vegas. Here he made 29 appearances, scored two goals, added three assists, and was an Honorable Mention for the All-WAC teams.

While at college, Claudio was with FC Golden State Force of the USL League Two during their 2019 season, but didn't make an appearance for the team. In 2021, he played with NPSL club Laredo Heat, scoring two goals in nine games, and was also named as a finalist for the NPSL Conference XI awards.

=== Professional ===
On March 22, 2022, Claudio signed with USL League One club Union Omaha. He debuted for the club on April 9, 2022, appearing as an 85th–minute substitute during a 2–2 draw with Forward Madison.

Claudio signed with League One expansion club One Knoxville on January 26, 2023.
