= 2025 North Carolina FC season =

North Carolina FC
2025 season
- Owner: Stephen Malik
- Head coach: John Bradford
- Stadium: First Horizon Stadium at WakeMed Soccer Park
- USL Championship: TBD
- USL Championship Playoffs: Conference: 3rd League: 5th
- U.S. Open Cup: Round of 32
- USL Cup: Group stage
Home colors	Away colors

The 2025 North Carolina FC season was the 19th season of the club's existence, and their fifth season in the USL Championship, the second division in the American soccer pyramid, after three years in the USL League One, the third division of the American soccer pyramid. North Carolina was coached by John Bradford, his seventh season with the club, and played their home games at First Horizon Stadium at WakeMed Soccer Park.

== Roster ==
As of March 9, 2025

Note: Flags indicate national team as defined under FIFA eligibility rules; some limited exceptions apply. Players may hold more than one non-FIFA nationality.

No.	Pos.	Nation	Player
1	GK	USA	Jake McGuire
4	DF	SEN	Justin Malou
5	DF	ENG	Paco Craig
7	FW	USA	Evan Conway
8	MF	BRA	Pedro Dolabella
9	FW	VIN	Oalex Anderson
10	MF	PUR	Jaden Servania
11	DF	MTQ	Patrick Burner
13	MF	FRA	Louis Perez
14	DF	BRA	Rafa Mentzingen
15	MF	USA	Mikey Maldonado

No.	Pos.	Nation	Player
16	MF	BRA	Rodrigo da Costa
17	MF	USA	Collin Martin
19	MF	PLE	Ahmad Al-Qaq
20	DF	USA	Conor Donovan
24	GK	USA	Trevor Mulqueen
25	GK	JPN	Akira Fitzgerald
26	FW	USA	Adam Luckhurst
27	DF	USA	Bryce Washington
42	DF	USA	Ezra Armstrong
44	MF	SKN	Raheem Somersall
55	DF	TRI	Triston Hodge

USL Academy Contract

== Competitions ==
=== USL Championship ===
==== Standings ====
Pos	Team	Pld	W	L	T	GF	GA	GD	Pts	Qualification
1	Louisville City FC (S)	30	22	1	7	56	19	+37	73	Playoffs
2	Charleston Battery	30	19	6	5	62	32	+30	62	Playoffs
3	North Carolina FC	30	13	11	6	40	39	+1	45	Playoffs
4	Pittsburgh Riverhounds SC (C)	30	12	10	8	32	28	+4	44 (Note: Pittsburgh Riverhounds SC are ahead of Hartford Athletic on head-to-head points. PGH 6, HFD 0.)	Playoffs
5	Hartford Athletic	30	13	12	5	48	36	+12	44	Playoffs

Source: USL Championship Standings
Rules for classification: 1) head-to-head points; 2) head-to-head goal differential; 3) points-per-game within conference; 4) total wins; 5) total goal differential; 6) total goals scored; 7) points earned against top four Conference finishers; 8) disciplinary points; 9) coin toss or drawing of lots
(C) Champions; (S) Players' Shield winner

==== Match results ====
On December 19, 2024, the USL Championship released the regular season schedule for all 24 teams.

All times are in Eastern Time, unless otherwise indicated.

===== March =====
March 8, 2025 1	North Carolina FC	1–1	Pittsburgh Riverhounds SC	Cary, North Carolina
	Conway 22'	Report	Williams 57'	Stadium: WakeMed Soccer Park; Attendance: 2,331; Referee: Matthew Corrigan

March 15, 2025 2	North Carolina FC	1–2	Loudoun United FC	Cary, North Carolina
8:00 PM EDT		Report		Stadium: WakeMed Soccer Park

March 22, 2025 3	FC Tulsa	0-1	North Carolina FC	Tulsa, Oklahoma
7:00 PM CDT		Report	Dolabella 82'	Stadium: ONEOK Field; Attendance: 2,931

March 29, 2025 4	North Carolina FC	2–1	Charleston Battery	Cary, NC
	Conway 24'; Smith 33' (o.g.)	Report	Jennings 45'+5' (pen.)	Stadium: WakeMed Soccer Park; Attendance: 2,480; Referee: Natalie Simon

===== April =====
April 5, 2025 5	Indy Eleven	2–2	North Carolina FC	Indianapolis, IN
7:00 PM EST	Murphy (yellow card) 6'; Musa (yellow card) 8'; Somersall 26' (o.g.); Kizza 48'; Quinn (yellow card) 89'	Report	Mentzingen (yellow card) 13'; Somersall (yellow card) 45'; Conway 51'; Craig (yellow card) 81'; Servania (yellow card) 83'; Donovan 90+3'	Stadium: Carroll Stadium; Attendance: 7,017; Referee: Edson Carvajal

April 12, 2025 6	New Mexico United	1−0	North Carolina FC	Albuquerque, New Mexico
7:00 PM	Akale (yellow card) 22'; Zelalem (yellow card) 38'; Jabang (yellow card) 67'; Amang 90+2'	Report	Perez (yellow card) 9'; Mentzingen (yellow card) 36'; Somersall (yellow card) 56'; Dolabella (yellow card) 71'	Stadium: Isotopes Park; Attendance: 10,291; Referee: Nabil Bensalah

April 19, 2025 7	Miami FC	2–1	North Carolina FC	Miami, Florida
7:00 pm EDT	Bonfiglio 18'; Knutson 26'; Mercado (yellow card) 30'; Zárate (yellow card) 82'	Report	Hodge (yellow card) 25'; Craig 45+2'	Stadium: South Dade Kia Field at Pitbull Stadium; Attendance: 1,103; Referee: Atahan Yaya

===== May =====
May 3, 2025 8	Pittsburgh Riverhounds SC	0–2	North Carolina FC	Pittsburgh, Pennsylvania
		Report	Pérez 66' Dolabella 72'	Stadium: Highmark Stadium; Attendance: 3,808; Referee: Corbyn May

May 9, 2025 9	North Carolina FC	0–1	Orange County SC	Cary, North Carolina
	da Costa 45'	Report		Stadium: First Horizon Stadium; Attendance: 2,788; Referee: Rodrigo Albuquerque

May 16, 2025 10	North Carolina FC	4–2	Oakland Roots SC	Cary, North Carolina
7:00 PM	Servania 33'; Martin (yellow card) 38'; Maldonado 45+2'; Washington (yellow card) 53'; Perez 74'; Anderson 90+9'	Report	Hackshaw (yellow card) 28'; Damm 63' (yellow card) 83'; Wilson 81'	Stadium: WakeMed Soccer Park; Attendance: 2,736; Referee: Gerald Flores

===== June =====
June 7, 2025 11	Hartford Athletic	0–1	North Carolina FC	Hartford, Connecticut
	Farrell (yellow card) 64' (yellow-red card) 68'	Report	Dolabella 90'+4'	Stadium: Trinity Health Stadium; Attendance: 4,320; Referee: Edson Carvajal

June 14, 2025 12	Rhode Island FC	2–1	North Carolina FC	Pawtucket, RI
7:00PM	Dikwa 18'; Sanchez (yellow card) 23'; Nodarse (yellow card) 81'; Rodriguez 90+5' (pen.)	Report	Perez (yellow card) 12'; Mentzingen 35'; Burner (yellow card) 40'	Stadium: Centreville Bank Stadium; Attendance: 7,072; Referee: Elijio Arreguin

June 20, 2025 13	North Carolina FC	2–1	Louisville City FC	Cary, North Carolina
7:00 PM	Sundstrom 45'; Luckhurst 66'	Report	Goodrum 48'	Stadium: WakeMed Soccer Park; Attendance: 2,479; Referee: Brad Jensen

===== July =====
July 6, 2025 14	Charleston Battery	1–0	North Carolina FC	Mount Pleasant, South Carolina
	Ycaza 40'	Report		Stadium: Patriots Point Soccer Complex; Attendance: 3,260; Referee: Alyssa Nichols

July 11, 2025 15	North Carolina FC	2–3	Birmingham Legion FC	Cary, North Carolina
6:30 PM	Dolabella 40'; Conway 90'+9'	Report	Damus 45'; Trejo 56', 63'	Stadium: WakeMed Soccer Park; Attendance: 2,269; Referee: Thomas Snyder

July 18, 2025 16	North Carolina FC	4–2	Indy Eleven	Cary, NC
7:30 PM EST	Mentzingen 20'; Servania 48'; Conway 55'; Dolabella 73'	Report	Murphy 43'; Blake 90'+3' (pen.)	Stadium: WakeMed Soccer Park; Attendance: 2,383; Referee: Joshua Encarnación

===== August =====
August 2, 2025 17	Louisville City FC	4–1	North Carolina FC	Louisville, Kentucky
8:00 PM	Lambert 5'; Goodrum 50'; Wilson 62'; Davila 88'		Anderson 18'	Stadium: Lynn Family Stadium; Attendance: 9,756; Referee: Gerald Flores

August 9, 2025 18	North Carolina FC	2–1	Tampa Bay Rowdies	Cary, North Carolina
	Conway 39'; Pérez 45'+6' (pen.)	Report	Hilton 23'	Stadium: WakeMed Soccer Park; Attendance: 2,500; Referee: Muhammad Kaleia

August 15, 2025 19	North Carolina FC	1–1	Detroit City FC	Cary, North Carolina
	Dolabella 23'	Report	Smith 62'	Stadium: WakeMed Soccer Park; Attendance: 2,011; Referee: Christian Campo Hernández

August 23, 2025 20	Las Vegas Lights FC	1–2	North Carolina FC	Las Vegas, Nevada
10:30 PM	Gannon 83'	Report	Dolabella 3'; Roberts 76'	Stadium: Cashman Field; Attendance: 2,504; Referee: Drew Klemp

August 30, 2025 21	North Carolina FC	2–3	Hartford Athletic	Cary, North Carolina
	Anderson 34'; Somersall 80'	Report	Careaga 5'; Hodge 86' (o.g.); Diz Pe 90'+3'	Stadium: WakeMed Soccer Park; Referee: Amin Hadzic

===== September =====
September 5, 2025 22	Lexington SC	2–1	North Carolina FC	Lexington, Kentucky
7:00 PM	Ajago 45'+2'; Firmino 72'	Report	da Costa 87'	Stadium: Lexington SC Stadium; Attendance: 4,233; Referee: Atahan Yaya

September 12, 2025 23	North Carolina FC	1–0	El Paso Locomotive FC	Cary, North Carolina
7:00 PM	Conway 45'+8'	Report	Ackwei (red card) 14'	Stadium: WakeMed Soccer Park; Attendance: 2,365; Referee: Joe Surgan

September 20, 2025 24	Tampa Bay Rowdies	2–2	North Carolina FC	St. Petersburg, Florida
7:00 PM	Arteaga 37'; Pacius 82'	Report	Conway 14'; Anderson 90'+5'	Stadium: Al Lang Stadium; Attendance: 5,160; Referee: Corbyn May

September 26, 2025 25	North Carolina FC	1–0	Miami FC	Cary, North Carolina
7:00 PM	Conway 13'	Report		Stadium: WakeMed Soccer Park; Attendance: 3,774; Referee: Edson Carvajal

===== October =====
October 1, 2025 26	Birmingham Legion FC	1–1	North Carolina FC	Birmingham, Alabama
7:00 PM	Turnbull 90'+6'	Report	Forbes 32'	Stadium: Protective Stadium; Attendance: 3,935; Referee: Calin Radosav

October 4, 2025 27	Detroit City FC	2–0	North Carolina FC	Hamtramck, MI
4:00 PM EDT	Cedeno 44' (pen.); Diouf 74'	Report		Stadium: Keyworth Stadium; Attendance: 6,127; Referee: Mark Verso

October 10, 2025 28	North Carolina FC	0–2	Phoenix Rising FC	Cary, North Carolina
7:00 PM		Report	Dennis 35'; Smith 61'	Stadium: WakeMed Soccer Park; Attendance: 2,526; Referee: Elton García

October 18, 2025 29	North Carolina FC	0−0	Rhode Island FC	Cary, North Carolina
4:00PM		Report		Stadium: WakeMed Soccer Park; Attendance: 3,586; Referee: Elijio Arreguin

October 25, 2025 30	Loudoun United FC	0–1	North Carolina FC	Leesburg, Virginia
5:00 PM EDT		Report	Anderson 58'	Stadium: Segra Field; Attendance: 4,204; Referee: Brad Jensen

==== USL Championship playoffs ====
As the third seed in the Eastern Conference, North Carolina clinched a playoff spot in the 2025 USL Championship playoffs, being matched up at home against Loudoun United FC. At home, North Carolina scored a quick goal in the sixth minute to clinch a 10 victory at home. In the Conference Semi-Finals, the club is matched up against seventh-seeded Rhode Island FC, the runners-up in the 2024 USL Championship finals.

November 1, 2025 Conference Quarter-Finals	North Carolina FC	1–0	Loudoun United FC	Cary, North Carolina
7:30 PM ET	Anderson 6'; Al-Qaq (yellow card) 70'; Sundstrom (yellow card) 90'; Burner (yellow card) 90+1'	Report	Turner (yellow card) 10'	Stadium: First Horizon Stadium at WakeMed Soccer Park; Attendance: 2,005; Referee: Natalie Simon

November 8, 2025 Conference Semi-Finals	North Carolina FC	0–2	Rhode Island FC	Cary, North Carolina
7:00 PM ET	Somersall (yellow card) 36'; Maldonado (yellow card) 42'	Report	Fuson (yellow card) 29'; Dikwa 81', 90+3'	Stadium: First Horizon Stadium at WakeMed Soccer Park; Attendance: 2,287; Referee: Joshua Encarnación

=== USL Cup ===
North Carolina participated in the second edition of the USL Cup, the first edition to feature teams from both the USL Championship and League One.

==== Standings ====
Pos	Lg	Team	Pld	W	PKW	PKL	L	GF	GA	GD	Pts
2	USL1	Charlotte Independence	4	2	1	1	0	8	4	+4	9
3	USLC	Louisville City FC	4	3	0	0	1	8	4	+4	9
4	USLC	Lexington SC	4	1	0	1	2	6	5	+1	4
5	USLC	North Carolina FC	4	1	1	0	2	3	4	−1	5
6	USL1	Richmond Kickers	4	0	0	0	4	1	11	−10	0

Updated to match(es) played on July 26, 2025. Source: USL

==== Group stage ====
April 25, 2025	North Carolina FC	1–2	Charlotte Independence	Cary, North Carolina
7:00 PM EDT	Anderson 27'	Report	Chaney 10'; Álvarez 25' (pen.)	Stadium: First Horizon Stadium at WakeMed Soccer Park; Attendance: 2,428; Referee: Mark Verso

May 31, 2025	Richmond Kickers	0–1	North Carolina FC	Richmond, Virginia
7:00 PM EDT		Report	Luckhurst 81'	Stadium: City Stadium; Attendance: 4,753; Referee: Alex Beehler

June 29, 2025	Louisville City FC	1–0	North Carolina FC	Louisville, Kentucky
8:00 PM EDT	Wilson 10'	Report		Stadium: Lynn Family Stadium; Attendance: 7,002; Referee: Jeremy Scheer
Note: Match moved from June 28 to June 29 to accommodate travel issues experienced by North Carolina FC.

July 25, 2025	North Carolina FC	1–1 (5–3 p)	Loudoun United FC	Cary, North Carolina
7:30 PM EDT	Perez 90+13'	Report	Bidois 36'	Stadium: First Horizon Stadium at WakeMed Soccer Park; Attendance: 1,602; Referee: John Matto
	Penalties
	Perez (penalty scored); Mentzingen (penalty scored); Maldonado (penalty scored); Dolabella (penalty scored); Conway (penalty scored)		(penalty scored) Tingey; (penalty missed) Mines; (penalty scored) Nagy; (penalty scored) Skundrich

=== U.S. Open Cup ===
North Carolina, as a member of the second division USL Championship, entered the U.S. Open Cup in the Third Round based on their performance in the 2024 USL Championship season.

April 15, 2025	Charlotte Independence (USL1) (North Carolina)	1–3	North Carolina FC (USLC)	Matthews, North Carolina
7:00 p.m. EDT	Bakero 48'	Report	Anderson 71'; da Costa 74', 77'	Stadium: Sportsplex at Matthews; Attendance: 584; Referee: Danielle Chesney

May 6, 2025	North Carolina FC (North Carolina)	1–4 (a.e.t.)	(North Carolina) Charlotte FC	Cary, North Carolina
7:00 p.m. EDT	Mentzingen 98'	Report	Abada 97'; Agyemang 104'; Petković 119'; Vargas 120+3'	Stadium: WakeMed Soccer Park; Attendance: 4,155; Referee: John Matto
