= 2024 North Carolina FC season =

North Carolina FC
2024 season
- Owner: Stephen Malik
- Head coach: John Bradford
- Stadium: WakeMed Soccer Park
- USL Championship: Eastern Conference: 8th
- USL Championship Playoffs: Eastern Conference Quarterfinals
- U.S. Open Cup: Round of 32
- Top goalscorer: League: Oalex Anderson & Evan Conway (12 goals); All: Oalex Anderson (13 goals)
- Highest home attendance: 6,083 (October 26, against Las Vegas Lights)
- Lowest home attendance: 1,359 (May 14, against Loudoun United FC)
- Average home league attendance: 2,094

The 2024 North Carolina FC season was the 18th season of the club's existence, and their fourth season in the USL Championship, the second division in the American soccer pyramid, after three years in the USL League One, the third division of the American soccer pyramid. North Carolina is coached by John Bradford, his sixth season with the club, and played their home games at WakeMed Soccer Park.

During the offseason, North Carolina experienced multiple promotions. It was announced on August 7, 2023, that North Carolina will return to the USL Championship for the 2024 season. Along with their return to the second division, coach John Bradford was promoted to the position of Sporting Director along with his duties of Head Coach, after five seasons with the club.

== Roster ==
As of July 22, 2024

Note: Flags indicate national team as defined under FIFA eligibility rules; some limited exceptions apply. Players may hold more than one non-FIFA nationality.

No.	Pos.	Nation	Player
1	GK	USA	Jake McGuire
2	DF	ENG	Paco Craig
4	DF	SEN	Justin Malou
5	DF	USA	Daniel Navarro
6	MF	USA	Jacori Hayes
7	DF	USA	Lamar Batista
8	FW	FRA	Louis Perez
9	FW	VIN	Oalex Anderson
10	FW	PUR	Jaden Servania
11	FW	USA	Evan Conway
14	FW	BRA	Rafael Mentzingen
15	MF	USA	Michael Maldonado
16	MF	BRA	Rodrigo da Costa
17	MF	USA	Collin Martin

No.	Pos.	Nation	Player
25	GK	JPN	Akira Fitzgerald
27	DF	USA	Bryce Washington
28	DF	USA	Shaft Brewer
42	DF	USA	Ezra Armstrong
44	MF	SKN	Raheem Sommersall
48	MF	USA	Kyrome Lumsden
60	FW	SLV	Raul Avalos
61	DF	USA	Xavier Holloway
62	FW	USA	Kevin Aguilar
63	DF	USA	Luc Lavielle
64	DF	USA	Benjamin Salter
65	MF	USA	Jaxon Silverman
66	MF	USA	Finn Sundstrom

== Competitions ==
=== USL Championship ===
==== Standings ====
Pos	Team	Pld	W	L	T	GF	GA	GD	Pts	Qualification
6	Tampa Bay Rowdies	34	14	12	8	55	46	+9	50	Playoffs
7	Pittsburgh Riverhounds SC	34	12	10	12	41	28	+13	48	Playoffs
8	North Carolina FC	34	13	12	9	54	43	+11	48	Playoffs
9	Birmingham Legion FC	34	13	15	6	44	51	−7	45	
10	Hartford Athletic	34	12	14	8	39	52	−13	44	

Source: USL Championship Standings
Rules for classification: 1) head-to-head points; 2) head-to-head goal differential; 3) points-per game within conference; 4) total wins; 5) total goal differential; 6) total goals scored; 7) points earned against top four Conference finishers; 8) disciplinary points; 9) coin toss or drawing of lots

==== Match results ====
On December 18, 2023, the USL Championship released the regular season schedule for all 24 teams.

All times are in Eastern Standard Time.

===== March =====
March 9 1	North Carolina FC	0–0	Charleston Battery	Cary, North Carolina
7:00 PM	Somersall (yellow card) 39'; Placias (yellow card) 87'	Report	LaCava (yellow card) 20'; Conway (yellow card) 84'; Torres (yellow card) 90+4'	Stadium: WakeMed Soccer Park; Attendance: 2,576; Referee: Jeremy Scheer

March 16 2	Loudoun United FC	3–1	North Carolina FC	Leesburg, Virginia
9:30 PM	ElMedkhar 23'; Leggett (yellow card) 37'; Ryan 61', (yellow card) 71'; Aboukoura 85'	Report	da Costa (yellow card) 36'; Maldonado 38'	Stadium: Segra Field; Attendance: 3,810; Referee: Elvis Osmanovic

March 23 3	North Carolina FC	1–1	Tampa Bay Rowdies	Cary, North Carolina
7:00 PM	Mentzingen 75'	Report	Maldonado 63' (o.g.); Dezart (yellow card) 90+3'	Stadium: WakeMed Soccer Park; Attendance: 1,796; Referee: John Griggs

March 29 4	North Carolina FC	2–0	Hartford Athletic	Cary, North Carolina
7:00 PM	Perez 25' (pen.); Anderson 35'; Batista (yellow card) 44'; Rafa (yellow card) 71'; Maldonado (yellow card) 80'; Servania (yellow card) 90+3'	Report	Asiedu (yellow card) 25'; Chapman (yellow card) 31', (goal) 72'; Beckford (yellow card) 69'; Mushagalusa (yellow card) 80'	Stadium: WakeMed Soccer Park; Attendance: 1,465; Referee: Thomas Snyder

===== April =====
April 6 5	Detroit City FC	1–0	North Carolina FC	Hamtramck, Michigan
2:00 PM	Blanco 9' (o.g.); Diop (yellow card) 26'; Murphy (yellow card) 66'; Levis (yellow card) 77'; Amoo-Mensah (yellow card) 86'	Report	Rafael Mentzingen (yellow card) 25'; Batista (yellow card) 75'; Craig (yellow card) 83'; Malou (yellow card) 89'	Stadium: Keyworth Stadium; Attendance: 5,155; Referee: Nabil Bensalah

April 14 6	North Carolina FC	1–1	Birmingham Legion FC	Cary, North Carolina
5:00 PM	da Costa 2' (pen.)	Report	Martinez 23' (yellow card) 58'; Paterson (yellow card) 31'; Perez (yellow card) 90+5'	Stadium: WakeMed Soccer Park; Attendance: 1,807; Referee: Velimir Stefanovic

April 20 7	North Carolina FC	2–3	New Mexico United	Cary, North Carolina
7:00 PM	Placias 16'; Armstrong 28'; Craig (yellow card) 87'	Report	Hurst 19' 29' (pen.); Bailey (yellow card) 33'; Rivas 90+1'	Stadium: WakeMed Soccer Park; Attendance: 1,916; Referee: Matthew Corrigan

April 27 8	Indy Eleven	2–1	North Carolina FC	Indianapolis, IN
7:00 PM	Ikoba (yellow card) 45+1'; Maldonado 48' (o.g.); Martínez 75'	Report	Perez 51'; Placias (yellow card) 72'; Armstrong (yellow card) 74'; Brewer (yellow card) 85'; da Costa (yellow card) 90+1'	Stadium: Carroll Stadium; Attendance: 10,071; Referee: Eric Tattersall

===== May =====
May 4 9	North Carolina FC	0–0	Rhode Island FC	Cary, NC
7:00 PM	Perez (yellow card) 50'	Report	Holstad (yellow card) 32'; Nodarse (yellow card) 40'; Twumasi (yellow card) 90+3'	Stadium: WakeMed Soccer Park; Attendance: 3,187; Referee: Jeremy Flores

May 14 10	North Carolina FC	2–0	Loudoun United FC	Cary, North Carolina
7:26 PM	Mentzingen (yellow card) 1'; Craig 24'; Somersall (yellow card) 41'; Armstrong (yellow card) 67' (goal) 90+7'; Batista (yellow card) 74' (yellow-red card) 90+12'	Report	Erlandson (yellow card) 13'; Skundrich (yellow card) 26'; Fauroux (yellow card) 32'	Stadium: WakeMed Soccer Park; Attendance: 1,359; Referee: Jonathan Bilinski

May 18 11	Pittsburgh Riverhounds SC	1–1	North Carolina FC	Pittsburgh, PA
7:00 PM	Osumanu (yellow card) 6'; Kizza 44'; Etou (yellow card) 67'; Sample (yellow card) 85'	Report	Conway 58'	Stadium: Highmark Stadium; Attendance: 5,113; Referee: Natalie Simon

May 25 12	Miami FC	0–4	North Carolina FC	Miami, Florida
7:00 PM	Molina (yellow card) 5'; Knutson (yellow card) 12'; Jean-Francois (yellow card) 90+2'; Mitrano (yellow card) 90+4'	Report	Conway 51'; Anderson 69'; Maldonado 76'; da Costa 89'	Stadium: FIU Soccer Stadium; Attendance: 1,039; Referee: (United States) Trevor Wiseman

===== June =====
June 8 13	Louisville City FC	2–1	North Carolina FC	Louisville, Kentucky
8:00 PM	Gleadle 31'; Ordoñez (yellow card) 62'; Totsh 70' (pen.); Wynder (yellow card) 83'	Report	Washington (yellow card) 25'; Conway 90+2'; Batista (yellow card) 90+5'	Stadium: Lynn Family Stadium; Attendance: 9,733; Referee: Abdou Ndiaye; Assistant referees: Matt Trotter; Eric Burton; Fourth official: Matthew Fotia

June 16 14	North Carolina FC	2–0	Monterey Bay FC	Cary, North Carolina
6:00 PM	Anderson 28'; Mentzingen 34' (pen.); Perez (yellow card) 85'	Report	Martinez (yellow card) 26'; Guzmán (red card) 32'; Rebollar (yellow card) 45+3'	Stadium: WakeMed Soccer Park; Attendance: 2,047; Referee: Esad Omanovic

June 22 15	North Carolina FC	0–0	Pittsburgh Riverhounds SC	Cary, North Carolina
7:30 PM	da Costa (yellow card) 32'; Maldonado (yellow card) 44'; Armstrong (yellow card) 44'; Malou (yellow card) 58'	Report	Walti (yellow card) 44'; Griffin (yellow card) 52'; Suber (yellow card) 64'	Stadium: WakeMed Soccer Park; Attendance: 1,996; Referee: Muhammad Hassan

June 28 16	Charleston Battery	5–2	North Carolina FC	Mount Pleasant, South Carolina
7:30 PM	Markanich (yellow card) 45+5' (goal) 80'; Myers 58' 90+2' 90+8' (pen.); Dossantos (yellow card) 84'; Rodriguez (yellow card) 88'; Conway 90+4'	Report	Conway 27' (yellow card) 37'; Batista (yellow card) 42'; Armstrong (yellow card) 45+3' (yellow-red card) 50'; Brewer 45+6'; McGuire (yellow card) 90+1'	Stadium: Patriots Point Soccer Complex; Attendance: 3,876; Referee: Abdou Ndiaye

===== July =====
July 6 17	North Carolina FC	4–1	Miami FC	Cary, North Carolina
7:30	Craig (yellow card) 11'; Mentzingen 50'; Conway 63' 64'; Anderson 77' (pen.) da Costa (yellow card) 90+3'	Report	Knutson (yellow card) 7'; Balogun 18'; Cardona (yellow card) 45+2'; Mitrano (yellow card) 57'; Biek (yellow card) 66'	Stadium: WakeMed Soccer Park; Attendance: 2,161; Referee: Sergii Demianchuk

July 13 18	Sacramento Republic FC	0–0	North Carolina FC	Sacramento, California
11:00 PM	Portillo (yellow card) 62'; Fernandes (yellow card) 90+1'	Report	Mentzingen (yellow card) 66'; Maldonado (yellow card) 74'; Craig (yellow card) 87'	Stadium: Heart Health Park; Attendance: 9,388; Referee: Corbyn May

July 19 19	North Carolina FC	1–1	Detroit City FC	Cary, North Carolina
7:30 PM	Armstrong (red card) 5'; Anderson (yellow card) 56'; Conway 67'; Servania (yellow card) 86'; Batista (yellow card) 90+2'	Report	Bryant (yellow card) 10'; Amoo-Mensah (yellow card) 26'; Bezerra 90+3'; Matthews (red card) 90+4'	Stadium: WakeMed Soccer Park; Attendance: 2,054; Referee: John Matto

July 27 20	Rhode Island FC	2–1	North Carolina FC	Smithfield, Rhode Island
7:30 PM	Nodarse (yellow card) 15'; Kwizera (yellow card) 65'; Doyle 74'; Herivaux 84' (yellow card) 90+1'	Report	Maldonado 30'; Brewer (yellow card) 72'; Craig (yellow card) 89'	Stadium: Beirne Stadium; Attendance: 4,045; Referee: Eric Tattersall

===== August =====
August 3 21	Orange County SC	0–1	North Carolina FC	Irvine, California
10:00 PM	Sorto (yellow card) 84'	Report	Batista (yellow card) 21'; Malou 27'; Servania (yellow card) 90+5'	Stadium: Championship Soccer Stadium; Attendance: 3,353; Referee: Benjamin Meyer

August 10 22	North Carolina FC	4–1	Colorado Springs Switchbacks FC	Cary, North Carolina
7:30 PM	Batista (yellow card) 25'; Anderson 40', 78' (yellow card) 79'; Conway 46' (yellow card) 65'; Servania (yellow card) 87'; Armstrong (yellow card) 89' da Costa 90+5'	Report	Foster 57'	Stadium: WakeMed Soccer Park; Attendance: 2,387; Referee: Thomas Snyder

August 17 23	San Antonio FC	1–0	North Carolina FC	San Antonio, Texas
9:00 PM	Hernández (yellow card) 50'; Brigido 79'	Report	Craig (yellow card) 17'; Anderson (yellow card) 51'; Maldonado (yellow card) 69'	Stadium: Toyota Field; Attendance: 6,729; Referee: Adam Kilpatrick

August 24 24	Phoenix Rising FC	0–0	North Carolina FC	Phoenix, Arizona
10:00 PM	Scearce (yellow card) 51'; Doratiotto (yellow card) 67'	Report	Armstrong (yellow card) 10'; Mentzingen (yellow card) 29'; Malou (yellow card) 41'; Martin (yellow card) 43'	Stadium: Phoenix Rising Soccer Stadium; Attendance: 5,000; Referee: Muhammad Hassan

August 31 25	North Carolina FC	4–6	Louisville City FC	Cary, North Carolina
7:30 PM	da Costa 11'; Anderson 29', 56'; Adams 45+3' (o.g.); Craig (yellow card) 58'	Report	Adams (yellow card) 10'; Wilson 18', 29'; Craig 32' (o.g.); Malou 36' (o.g.); Harris 60' (pen.), 69'; Serrano (yellow card) 67'; McFadden (yellow card) 70'	Stadium: WakeMed Soccer Park; Attendance: 2,219; Referee: Lorenzo Hernandez; Assistant referees: Eric Del Rosario Gandara; Aaron Riley; Fourth official: Josiah Parke

===== September =====
September 7 26	North Carolina FC	5–0	Oakland Roots SC	Cary, North Carolina
10:00 PM	da Costa 6'; Mentzingen 8'; Craig 32' (yellow card) 88'; Conway 44'; Washington (yellow card) 54'; Martin (yellow card) 59'; Armstrong 63'	Report		Stadium: WakeMed Soccer Park; Attendance: 1,946; Referee: Elvis Osmanovic

September 14 27	Memphis 901 FC	3-0	North Carolina FC	Memphis, Tennessee
8:00 PM	Lopes 10', 22'; Fernando 70'; Cissoko (yellow card) 77'	Report	Malou (red card) 3'; Martin (yellow card) 64'; Anderson (yellow card) 71'	Stadium: AutoZone Park; Attendance: 2,610; Referee: Calin Radosav

September 21 28	North Carolina FC	2-0	Indy Eleven	Cary, NC
7:30 PM	Mentzingen 19'; Maldonado (yellow card) 22'; Batista (yellow card) 45+7'; Mentzingen (yellow card) 55'; Martin (yellow card) 73'; Anderson 77'; Anderson (yellow card) 79'	Report	R. Williams (yellow card) 33'; White (yellow card) 45'	Stadium: WakeMed Soccer Park; Attendance: 2,478; Referee: Jeremy Scheer

September 29 29	El Paso Locomotive FC	1-0	North Carolina FC	El Paso, Texas
4:00 PM	Calvillo (yellow card) 29'; Ortiz (yellow card) 88'; Rivas 90'+2' (pen.)	Report	Martin (yellow card) 19'; Maldonado (yellow card) 45'+1'; Malou (yellow card) 88'; Craig (yellow card) 90'+1'	Stadium: Southwest University Park; Attendance: 4,014; Referee: Muhammad Hassan

===== October =====
October 6 30	Birmingham Legion	2-3	North Carolina FC	Birmingham, Alabama
6:00 PM	Martínez 32'; Rufe (yellow card) 45'+3'; Hernandez-Foster (yellow card) 46'; Zouhir (yellow card) 80' (goal) 89'	Report	Armstrong 8', 65'; Anderson 59'	Stadium: Protective Stadium; Referee: Alejo Calume

October 9 31	North Carolina FC	2-0	FC Tulsa	Cary, North Carolina
7:00 PM EDT	da Costa 19'; Perez (yellow card) 30'; Armstrong (yellow card) 36'; Conway 81' (pen.)	Report	Seagrist (yellow card) 22'; Bibout (yellow card) 33'; Booth (yellow card) 45'+3'; Sanchez (yellow card) 84'	Stadium: WakeMed Soccer Park; Attendance: 1,959; Referee: John Matto

October 12 32	Hartford Athletic	4-3	North Carolina FC	Hartford, Connecticut
7:30 PM	Barrera 9', 33'; Makangila 56'; Mamadou 63'; Farrell (yellow card) 89'; Ribeiro (yellow card) 90'+4'	Report	Conway 74'; da Costa 83'; Mentzingen (yellow card) 85'; Malou (yellow card) 90'+1'	Stadium: Trinity Health Stadium; Attendance: 5,500; Referee: Adam Kilpatrick

October 19 33	Tampa Bay Rowdies	0-2	North Carolina FC	Cary, North Carolina
7:30 PM	Bodily (yellow card) 35'; Niyongabire (yellow card) 81'	Report	Conway (yellow card) 41' (goal) 70'; Anderson 49'; Craig (yellow card) 60'; Niyongabire (yellow card) 81'	Stadium: WakeMed Soccer Park; Referee: Greg Dopka
Note: Match was to be played in St. Petersburg, but due to the effects of Hurricane Helene and Hurricane Milton, the match was moved to North Carolina, with Tampa retaining the "Home" side label

October 26 34	North Carolina FC	2-1	Las Vegas Lights FC	Cary, North Carolina
4:00 PM	Craig 12'; Martin (yellow card) 32'; Anderson 45' (yellow card) 45'+1'; Perez (yellow card) 63'; McGuire (yellow card) 76'; Mentzingen (yellow card) 78'; Batista (yellow card) 90'+8'	Report	Bennett 9'; Smart (yellow card) 37'	Stadium: WakeMed Soccer Park; Attendance: 6,083; Referee: Matthew Thompson

===== Playoffs =====
November 2 Conference Quarterfinals	Louisville City FC	3–2	North Carolina FC	Louisville, Kentucky
7:30 PM EDT	Dia 20'; Davila 24'; Perez 54'; Charpie (yellow card) 90+3'; Adams (yellow card) 90+4'	Report	Anderson 11'; Batista (yellow card) 59'; Washington 90+4'	Stadium: Lynn Family Stadium; Attendance: 8,875; Referee: Matthew Corrigan

=== U.S. Open Cup ===
As a member of the USL Championship, North Carolina FC entered the U.S. Open Cup in the Third Round, faced against Carolina Core FC, an independent club in the MLS Next Pro league, a team in the third division of U.S. Soccer. After winning 1–0 at home, North Carolina was matched up by the U.S. Soccer Federation on April 18, 2024, against fellow USL Championship team Phoenix Rising FC, again at home. They would eventually end up losing 1–2 in added extra time in a match that saw three players shown red cards.

April 17 Third Round	North Carolina FC (USLC)	1–0	(North Carolina) Carolina Core FC (MLSNP)	Cary, North Carolina
7:00 PM	Servania (yellow card) 27'; Lumsden (yellow card) 83'; Hayes (yellow card) 87'; Placias 60' (yellow card) 90+8'	Report	Ndoye (yellow card) 41'; Covi (yellow card) 71'; Orejuela (yellow card) 78'; Rodriguez (yellow card) 88'; Canete (yellow card) 90+6'	Stadium: WakeMed Soccer Park; Attendance: 1,112; Referee: Josh Parke

May 8 Round of 32	North Carolina FC (North Carolina)	1–2 (a.e.t.)	(Arizona) Phoenix Rising FC	Cary, North Carolina
19:00 EDT	Craig (yellow card) 9' (red card) 40'; Malou (yellow card) 54' (goal) 80'; Somersall (yellow card) 85'; Anderson (yellow card) 86'; Armstrong (yellow card) 90+2' (red card) 95'; Placias (yellow card) 90+6'	Report	Wyke (yellow card) 7' (red card) 24'; Azócar 9' (yellow card) 90+8'; Doratiotto (yellow card) 110' (goal) 111'; Gallardo (yellow card) 117'	Stadium: WakeMed Soccer Park; Attendance: 822; Referee: Guido Gonzales Jr.
