= List of North Carolina FC seasons =

Since its inaugural season in 2007, the American soccer club North Carolina FC, previously known as the Carolina RailHawks, has competed in the lower divisions of American soccer in a variety of leagues. The team is currently on hiatus, pending an application to join the USL Premier, and has had stints in the USL Championship, North American Soccer League, USSF Division 2 Professional League and USL First Division. The following list covers each season of the club's existence, documenting its performance in all competitive competitions.

== Key ==
Key to competitions

- USL Championship (USLC) – The second division of soccer in the United States, established in 2010 and previously known as USL and USL Pro. The Championship was the third division of American soccer from its founding until its elevation to second division status in 2017.
- North American Soccer League (NASL) – The second division of soccer in the United States from 2011 through 2017, now defunct.
- USSF Division 2 Professional League (D2 Pro) – The second division of soccer in the United States for a single season in 2010, now defunct.
- USL First Division (USL-1) – The second division of soccer in the United States from 2005 through 2009.
- U.S. Open Cup (USOC) – The premier knockout cup competition in US soccer, first contested in 1914.
- CONCACAF Champions League (CCL) – The premier competition in North American soccer since 1962. It went by the name of Champions' Cup until 2008.

Key to colors and symbols

1st or W	Winners
2nd or RU	Runners-up
Last	Wooden Spoon
♦	League Golden Boot
	Highest average attendance

Key to league record

- Season = The year and article of the season
- Div = Level on pyramid
- League = League name
- Pld = Games played
- W = Games won
- L = Games lost
- D = Games drawn
- GF = Goals scored
- GA = Goals against
- Pts = Points
- PPG = Points per game
- Conf = Conference position
- Overall = League position

Key to cup record

- DNE = Did not enter
- DNQ = Did not qualify
- NH = Competition not held or canceled
- QR = Qualifying round
- PR = Preliminary round
- GS = Group stage
- R1 = First round
- R2 = Second round
- R3 = Third round
- R4 = Fourth round
- R5 = Fifth round
- QF = Quarterfinals
- SF = Semifinals
- RU = Runners-up
- W = Winners

== Seasons ==
Season	League											Position		Playoffs	USOC	Continental / Other	Average attendance	Top goalscorer(s)	
Season	Div	League	Pld	W	L	D	GF	GA	GD	Pts	PPG	Conf.	Overall	Playoffs	USOC	Continental / Other	Average attendance	Name	Goals
2007	2	USL-1	28	8	12	8	24	34	−10	32	1.14	N/A	8th	QF	SF	Ineligible	4,962	(Nigeria) Connally Edozien	7
2008	2	USL-1	30	9	11	10	34	42	−8	37	1.23	N/A	8th	DNQ	Ro16	Ineligible	3,869	(Ivory Coast) Hamed Diallo	7
2009	2	USL-1	30	16	7	7	43	19	+24	55	1.83	N/A	2nd	QF	R2	DNQ	2,943	(United States) Daniel Paladini	10
2010	2	D2 Pro	30	13	9	8	44	32	+12	47	1.56	1st	4th	RU	R2	DNQ	2,241	(Malta) Etienne Barbara	8
2011	2	NASL	28	17	8	3	50	26	+24	54	1.93	N/A	1st	SF	DNE	DNQ	3,353	(Malta) Etienne Barbara	20
2012	2	NASL	28	10	8	10	44	46	−2	40	1.43	N/A	4th	SF	Ro16	Ineligible	3,883	(United States) Nick Zimmerman	15
2013	2	NASL	26	12	7	7	41	32	+9	43	1.65	N/A	1st	DNQ	QF	DNQ	4,708	(United States) Brian Shriver	16
2014	2	NASL	27	13	9	5	41	31	+10	43	1.59	N/A	5th	DNQ	QF	DNQ	4,551	(United States) Zack Schilawski	9
2015	2	NASL	30	9	13	8	44	49	−5	35	1.17	N/A	6th	DNQ	R3	DNQ	4,539	(Spain) Nacho Novo	11
2016	2	NASL	32	11	14	7	36	48	−12	40	1.25	N/A	8th	DNQ	R4	DNQ	5,058	(United States) Matthew Fondy	7
2017	2	NASL	32	11	9	12	46	37	+9	45	1.41	N/A	3rd	SF	R4	DNQ	4,471	(Jamaica) Lance Laing	9
2018	2	USL	34	13	13	8	60	50	+10	47	1.38	9th	18th	DNQ	R4	DNQ	4,730	(Mexico) Daniel Ríos	20
2019	2	USLC	34	16	10	8	57	37	+20	56	1.65	7th	10th	PR	R4	DNQ	4,118	(Bosnia and Herzegovina) Robert Kristo	11
2020	2	USLC	15	6	8	1	17	21	−4	19	1.27	10th	21st	DNQ	NH	DNQ	3,515	(Trinidad and Tobago) Andre Fortune II	6
2021	3	USL L1	28	7	4	17	30	50	–20	25	0.89	N/A	12th	DNQ	NH	DNQ	1,741	3 players tied	4
2022	3	USL L1	30	8	16	6	35	53	–18	30	1.00	N/A	11th	DNQ	R2	DNQ	1,874	(United States) Garrett McLaughlin	14
2023	3	USL L1	32	19	7	6	58	39	+19	63	1.91	N/A	2nd	W	R2	DNQ	2,389	(Saint Vincent and the Grenadines) Oalex Anderson	17
2024	2	USLC	34	13	12	9	54	43	+11	48	1.41	8th	13th	R1	R4	DNQ	2,320	(Saint Vincent and the Grenadines) Oalex Anderson	13
2025	2	USLC	30	13	11	6	40	39	+1	45	1.50	3rd	6th	SF	R32	DNQ	2,502	(United States) Evan Conway	9
Total	–	–	558	224	188	146	798	728	+70	759	1.44	–	–	–	–	–	–	(Saint Vincent and the Grenadines) Oalex Anderson	36

1. Avg. attendance only includes statistics from regular season matches.
2. Top goalscorer(s) includes all goals scored in regular season play, playoffs, U.S. Open Cup, and other competitive matches.
