= 2021 North Carolina FC season =

North Carolina FC
2021 season
- Owner: Stephen Malik
- Head coach: John Bradford
- Stadium: Sahlen's Stadium at WakeMed Soccer Park
- USL League One: 12th
- USL1 Playoffs: Did not qualify
Home colors	Away colors

The 2021 North Carolina FC season was the 15th season of the club's existence, and their first season in USL League One and the third division of the American soccer pyramid after dropping down from the USL Championship to focus on their youth system. North Carolina was coached by John Bradford, his first season leading the club, replacing former head coach Dave Sarachan. North Carolina FC played their home games at Sahlen's Stadium at WakeMed Soccer Park.

== Club ==
=== Roster ===
No.	Pos.	Nation	Player
1	GK	USA	Damian Las (on loan from Fulham)
2	DF	CAN	Malyk Hamilton
4	DF	USA	Max Flick
5	DF	SEN	Malick Mbaye
6	DF	SLV	Nelson Blanco
7	MF	BRA	Pecka
8	MF	USA	Luis Arriaga
9	MF	USA	Selmir Miscic (on loan from Philadelphia Union II)
12	MF	USA	Peter Pearson
14	DF	USA	Nelson Martinez
15	MF	SCO	Daniel Steedman
17	FW	USA	Josh Coan
18	GK	USA	Jake McGuire
19	MF	SLE	Jay Tee Kamara (on loan from Louisville City)
21	MF	CUW	Shermaine Martina
22	MF	USA	Aziel Jackson (on loan from Minnesota United)
24	GK	USA	Nick Holliday
25	DF	USA	Britton Fischer
26	FW	USA	Cole Frame
27	MF	USA	Drew Kerr
28	MF	USA	Marvin Mariche
29	MF	USA	Nata Martinez
32	DF	PUR	Parker O'Ferral
34	FW	USA	Rohit Thakur
35	MF	USA	Caden Tolentino
36	GK	USA	Sam Terranova
44	FW	JAM	Thorn Simpson (on loan from Molynes United)

North Carolina FC Youth Academy Contract

== Competitions ==
=== USL League One ===
==== Standings ====
Pos	Team	Pld	W	D	L	GF	GA	GD	Pts
8	New England Revolution II	28	11	4	13	33	39	−6	37
9	Forward Madison FC	28	8	12	8	32	34	−2	36
10	Fort Lauderdale CF	28	8	7	13	40	49	−9	31
11	Tormenta FC	28	8	6	14	36	47	−11	30
12	North Carolina FC	28	7	4	17	30	50	−20	25

Source: USL League One
Rules for classification: 1) points; 2) total wins; 3) total goal differential; 4) total goals scored; 5) points earned against top four Conference finishers; 6) disciplinary points; 7) drawing of lots.

==== Match results ====
On January 25, 2021, the USL League One office announced the schedule for all twelve teams.

May 8, 2021 1	North Carolina FC	0–1	Greenville Triumph	Cary, North Carolina
7:00 PM EDT	Miscic 15'	Report	Lomis 10' (pen.); McLean 65'	Stadium: WakeMed Soccer Park; Attendance: 1,440

May 15, 2021 2	Forward Madison	1–0	North Carolina FC	Madison, Wisconsin
8:00 PM EDT	Gebhard 90'+2'	Report		Stadium: Breese Stevens Field; Attendance: 1,529

May 22, 2021 3	Richmond Kickers	0–0	North Carolina FC	Richmond, Virginia
7:30 PM EDT		Report		Stadium: City Stadium; Attendance: 2,377

May 29, 2021 4	North Carolina FC	1–2	FC Tucson	Cary, North Carolina
7:00 PM EDT	Miscic 9'	Report	Pearson 11' (o.g.); Ferriol 50'; Pérez (yellow card) 86' (yellow-red card) 90'+4'	Stadium: WakeMed Soccer Park; Attendance: 1,060

June 5, 2021 5	North Carolina FC	1–2	Fort Lauderdale CF	Cary, North Carolina
7:00 PM EDT	Miscic 35'; Mbaye (red card) 76'	Report	Curry 30'; Azcona 90'+1'	Stadium: WakeMed Soccer Park; Attendance: 1,513

June 16, 2021 6	Greenville Triumph	2–1	North Carolina FC	City View, South Carolina
7:30 PM EDT	Smart 37'; Lomis 48'; Morrell (yellow card) 27' (yellow-red card) 65'	Report	Kamara 11'	Stadium: Legacy Early College Field; Attendance: 2,552

June 20, 2021 7	Chattanooga Red Wolves	3–2	North Carolina FC	East Ridge, Tennessee
7:00 PM EDT	Galindrez 73', 88'; Hernández 90'+2'	Report	Frame 6'; Flick 90'+5'	Stadium: CHI Memorial Stadium; Attendance: 1,924

June 25, 2021 8	North Carolina FC	2–1	Richmond Kickers	Cary, North Carolina
7:00 PM EDT	Flick 47'; Kamara 56'	Report	Terzaghi 6'; Calvo (yellow card) 11' (yellow-red card) 59'	Stadium: WakeMed Soccer Park; Attendance: 2,118

July 3, 2021 9	South Georgia Tormenta FC	0–0	North Carolina FC	Statesboro, Georgia
7:00 PM EDT	Galindrez 73', 88'; Hernández 90'+2'	Report		Stadium: Eagle Field; Attendance: 1,057

July 10, 2021 10	Greenville Triumph	0–0	North Carolina FC	City View, South Carolina
7:00 PM EDT		Report		Stadium: Legacy Early College Field; Attendance: 2,411

July 18, 2021 11	North Carolina FC	2–4	Toronto FC II	Cary, North Carolina
6:00 PM EDT	Simpson 26'; Pecka (red card) 34'; Frame 67'	Report	McLaughlin 23', 32', 83'; Carlini 75'	Stadium: WakeMed Soccer Park; Attendance: 1,088

July 21, 2021 12	North Carolina FC	4–0	Richmond Kickers	Cary, North Carolina
6:00 PM EDT	Kristo 19', 41'; Coan 48', 90'+2'	Report	Magalhaes (red card) 85'	Stadium: WakeMed Soccer Park; Attendance: 2,118

August 1, 2021 13	Fort Lauderdale CF	2–3	North Carolina FC	Fort Lauderdale, Florida
7:30 PM EDT	Azcona 11'; Méndez 79'	Report	Kamara 5'; Kristo 29' (pen.), 90'+1' (pen.)	Stadium: Chase Stadium

August 5, 2021 14	New England Revolution II	3–0	North Carolina FC	Foxborough, Massachusetts
7:00 PM EDT	Rivera 33'; Kizza 49', 74'	Report		Stadium: Gillette Stadium; Attendance: 100

August 10, 2021 15	North Carolina FC	1–4	Chattanooga Red Wolves	Cary, North Carolina
7:00 PM EDT	Frame 90'+4'	Report	Hernández 13'; Dietrich 21'; Galindrez 70'; Ricketts 76'	Stadium: WakeMed Soccer Park; Attendance: 1,211

August 14, 2021 16	North Texas SC	4–0	North Carolina FC	Arlington, Texas
9:00 PM EDT	ElMedkhar 10'; Kazu 26'; De Morais 40'; Hernandez 59' (pen.)	Report		Stadium: Choctaw Stadium; Attendance: 550

August 25, 2021 17	North Carolina FC	1–0	Forward Madison	Cary, North Carolina
7:00 PM EDT	Martinez 8'	Report		Stadium: WakeMed Soccer Park; Attendance: 996

August 28, 2021 18	Richmond Kickers	0–0	North Carolina FC	Richmond, Virginia
6:30 PM EDT		Report		Stadium: City Stadium; Attendance: 1,807

September 4, 2021 19	North Carolina FC	0–3	Union Omaha	Cary, North Carolina
7:00 PM EDT		Report	Viader 7', 53' (pen.); Rivera 85'	Stadium: WakeMed Soccer Park

September 11, 2021 20	North Carolina FC	4–1	New England Revolution II	Cary, North Carolina
7:00 PM EDT	Albadawi 16', 54'; Coan 26'; Kamara 64'	Report	Bajraktarevic 12'	Stadium: WakeMed Soccer Park; Attendance: 2,249

September 18, 2021 21	Chattanooga Red Wolves	3–1	North Carolina FC	East Ridge, Tennessee
7:00 PM EDT	Ricketts 52'; Galindrez 58'; Hernández 70'	Report	Arriaga 69'	Stadium: CHI Memorial Stadium; Attendance: 1,689

September 26, 2021 22	North Carolina FC	0–1	North Texas SC	Cary, North Carolina
2:00 PM EDT		Report	Hernandez 41'	Stadium: WakeMed Soccer Park; Attendance: 1,106

October 1, 2021 23	Toronto FC II	3–0	North Carolina FC	Toronto, Canada
4:00 PM EDT	Maples 65'; Petrasso 67'; Rothrock 73'	Report		Stadium: BMO Training Ground; Attendance: 1,689

October 9, 2021 24	North Carolina FC	2–3	Chattanooga Red Wolves	Cary, North Carolina
3:00 PM EDT	Pecka 14'; Jackson 48'	Report	Ricketts 37'; Luna 54'; Hernández 57'	Stadium: WakeMed Soccer Park; Attendance: 1,120

October 13, 2021 25	FC Tucson	0–2	North Carolina FC	Tucson, Arizona
10:00 PM EDT	Barnathan (red card) 27'	Report	Pearson 58'; Miscic 61' (pen.)	Stadium: Kino North Stadium; Attendance: 1,417

October 16, 2021 26	Union Omaha	4–1	North Carolina FC	Papillion, Nebraska
7:00 PM EDT	Conway 2', 18', 57'; Alihodzic 25'	Report	Mbaye 15'	Stadium: Werner Park; Attendance: 3,197

October 23, 2021 27	North Carolina FC	1–0	South Georgia Tormenta FC	Cary, North Carolina
7:00 PM EDT	Pearson 48'	Report	Somersall (yellow card) 31' (yellow-red card) 45'+2'	Stadium: WakeMed Soccer Park; Attendance: 1,373; Referee: Joshua Belk

October 30, 2021 28	North Carolina FC	0–2	Greenville Triumph	Cary, North Carolina
7:00 PM EDT		Report	Lomis 18'; Gavilanes 32'	Stadium: WakeMed Soccer Park; Attendance: 4,084
