= Cole Frame =

American soccer player

Personal information
- Full name: Robert Coleman Frame
- Date of birth: October 5, 2002 (age 24)
- Place of birth: Wake Forest, North Carolina, United States
- Height: 5 ft 8 in (1.73 m)
- Positions: Forward; winger

Team information
- Current team: Eintracht Nordhorn

Youth career
- 2016–2023: North Carolina FC

Senior career*
Years	Team	Apps	(Gls)
2021–2023	North Carolina FC	41	(3)
2021–2022	North Carolina FC U23	5	(2)
2023	→ Rio Grande Valley FC (loan)	3	(0)
2024–	Eintracht Nordhorn		
- * Club domestic league appearances and goals as of October 15, 2024

Robert Coleman Frame (born October 5, 2002) is an American soccer player who currently plays for German club Eintracht Nordhorn.

== Playing career ==
=== Youth ===
Frame played as part of the North Carolina FC academy from 2016. On March 24, 2021, Frame signed an academy contract with the club's senior team who compete in the USL League One. He made his debut on May 8, 2021, appearing as an 81st-minute substitute during a 2–1 loss to Greenville Triumph. His first goal came on June 20, 2021, vs. Chattanooga Red Wolves SC.

On June 16, 2023, Frame was loaned to USL Championship side Rio Grande Valley FC for the remainder of the season.
