= Collin Martin =

American soccer player (born 1994)

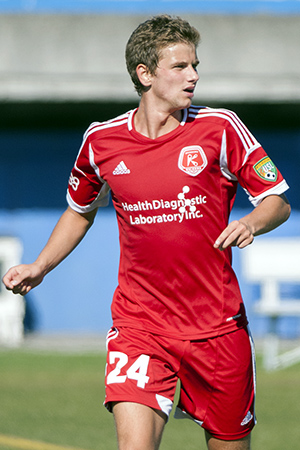
- Martin with Richmond Kickers in 2013

Personal information
- Date of birth: November 9, 1994 (age 32)
- Place of birth: Chevy Chase, Maryland, U.S.
- Height: 5 ft 11 in (1.80 m)
- Position: Midfielder

Youth career
- 2009–2012: D.C. United

College career
Years	Team	Apps	(Gls)
2012	Wake Forest Demon Deacons	20	(1)

Senior career*
Years	Team	Apps	(Gls)
2013–2016	D.C. United	15	(0)
2013−2015	→ Richmond Kickers (loan)	14	(1)
2017–2019	Minnesota United	26	(0)
2019	→ Hartford Athletic (loan)	7	(0)
2020–2023	San Diego Loyal	105	(4)
2024–2025	North Carolina FC	55	(0)

International career^{‡}
2012–2013	United States U20	5	(0)
- * Club domestic league appearances and goals as of October 26, 2025 ‡ National team caps and goals as of April 25, 2014

Collin Martin (born November 9, 1994) is a former American professional soccer player who played as a midfielder. He has played for D.C. United and Minnesota United FC in Major League Soccer, and for Richmond Kickers and Hartford Athletic in the United Soccer League. He came out as gay in June 2018, making him at the time the only out gay man in any of the big five American sports leagues or any top-division professional men's national soccer leagues. He was also reported at the time to be the only active male professional soccer player to be openly gay.

== Youth and College soccer ==
Born in Chevy Chase, Maryland, Martin joined the D.C. United Academy during the 2009–10 season as a 14-year-old in the under-16 category. In his second season with the U16s, Martin led the team in scoring with 13 goals while leading the side to finish top of its group in the U.S. Soccer Development Academy. Then, the next season, Martin was promoted to the under-18s where he led the team in scoring with 11 goals. He impressed the coaching staff enough that season to earn playing time with the D.C. United Reserves in MLS Reserve League action.

Martin then attended Wake Forest University where he played for the Wake Forest Demon Deacons soccer team for the 2012 season in which he scored one goal and registered six assists. At the end of the season, Martin earned All-ACC Freshman Team honors.

== Professional career ==
=== D.C. United ===
On July 10, 2013, it was announced that Martin had signed on as a homegrown player with D.C. United of Major League Soccer, thus becoming the team's sixth homegrown signing. After a short loan spell at the Richmond Kickers in the USL Pro, Martin made his debut for D.C. United on August 3, 2013, against the Montreal Impact in which he came on in the 76th minute for Nick DeLeon as United won the game 3–1. He finished the 2013 season with seven league appearances.

==== Richmond Kickers (loan) ====
On July 17, 2013, it was announced that D.C. United had sent Martin out on loan to their USL Pro affiliate, the Richmond Kickers. He made his one and only appearance for the Kickers on July 23 against the Vancouver Whitecaps Reserves in which he started and played 85 minutes as the Kickers won the match 2–1.

On September 13, 2014, he scored his first professional goal to open a 2–1 win over the Charleston Battery in the playoff quarter-finals.

=== Minnesota United ===
In January 2017, Martin was traded by D.C. to MLS expansion side Minnesota United FC in exchange for a fourth-round pick in the 2018 MLS SuperDraft. He made his debut on March 25 in a 5–2 loss at the New England Revolution, as a 63rd-minute substitute for Mohammed Saeid.

Martin played 12 matches in his first season in Minnesota, five as a starter. Having taken no part in the 2019 season, he was loaned in late April to USL Championship team Hartford Athletic. In October 2019, at the end of Minnesota's season, Martin was one of five players released.

=== San Diego Loyal SC ===
In February 2020, Martin was signed by San Diego Loyal for its inaugural season. He made his debut on March 11 in a 2–1 win at Tacoma Defiance, assisting the opener by Francis Atuahene via a free kick, and scored his first goal on September 2 to open a 1–1 tie at Las Vegas Lights FC.

During a home match against Phoenix Rising FC on September 30, 2020, Martin was the target of a homophobic slur by Phoenix midfielder Junior Flemmings during first-half stoppage time. Flemmings called him a "batty boy", a homophobic slur in his native Jamaica. After he went to the referee to report the incident, Martin was shown a red card that was later rescinded after the referee admitted he was confused. After Phoenix manager Rick Schantz declined to apologize and remove Flemmings, San Diego walked off the field and forfeited the match in protest. A week earlier, the Loyal had forfeited a match against the LA Galaxy II after a racial slur was used against one of their players. Flemmings was banned for six games and fined an undisclosed amount.

On May 7, 2022, Martin came on as a half-time substitute at New Mexico United with his team winning. He was sent off for his second yellow card in the 79th minute, and the hosts scored for a 1–1 tie in added time.

On March 3, 2023, San Diego Loyal unveiled their new kits through a collaboration with local street artists Signe Ditona and Paul Jimenez of Ground Floor Murals. A mural of Collin Martin was unveiled in Hillcrest.

San Diego Loyal folded following the 2023 USL Championship season and in December 2023 Martin signed with North Carolina FC.

=== North Carolina FC ===
In December 2023, Martin was signed by North Carolina FC. He made his debut on March 9 in a 0-0 tie at home against the Charleston Battery. On May 14, 2024, Martin reached 10,000 USL Championship Regular Season minutes in a 2-0 win against Loudoun United FC. On August 3, 2024, Martin was named the Man of the Match in their 1-0 win against Orange County SC. On September 21, 2024, Martin recorded his 150th USL Championship Regular Season appearance in a 2-0 win against Indy Eleven and recorded an assist. Martin was included as an honorable mention in the USL Championship Team of the Week for week 29 of the 2024 season.

== International career ==
Martin represented the United States at U-14, U-15, U-17, and U-20 levels.

== Personal life ==
Martin was raised in an observant Episcopalian family.

On June 29, 2018, Martin came out publicly as gay, making him at the time the only out gay man in any of the big five American sports leagues or any top-division professional men's national soccer leagues. He was also reported at the time to be the only active male professional soccer player to be openly gay.

Martin transferred his credits from Wake Forest University to George Washington University after joining D.C. United. He attended part-time for four years, and online for a fifth from Minnesota, before graduating in 2019 with a degree in history.

== Career statistics ==
As of matches played on May 16, 2025

Appearances and goals by club, season and competition
Club	Season	League			USL Cup		U.S. Open Cup		Champions League		Total		Ref.
Club	Season	Division	Apps	Goals	Apps	Goals	Apps	Goals	Apps	Goals	Apps	Goals	Ref.
D.C. United	2013	MLS	7	0	—		0	0	—		7	0	
D.C. United	2014	MLS	6	0	—		1	0	3	0	10	0	
D.C. United	2015	MLS	0	0	—		0	0	4	0	4	0	
D.C. United	2016	MLS	2	0	—		0	0	—		2	0	
D.C. United	Total		15	0	0	0	1	0	7	0	23	0	—
Richmond Kickers (loan)	2013	USL	1	0	—		0	0	—		1	0	
Richmond Kickers (loan)	2014	USL	6	1	—		0	0	—		6	1	
Richmond Kickers (loan)	2015	USL	7	0	—		0	0	—		7	0	
Richmond Kickers (loan)	Total		14	1	0	0	0	0	0	0	14	1	—
Minnesota United	2017	MLS	11	0	—		1	0	—		12	0	
Minnesota United	2018	MLS	12	0	—		2	0	—		14	0	
Minnesota United	2019	MLS	3	0	—		0	0	—		3	0	
Minnesota United	Total		26	0	0	0	3	0	0	0	29	0	—
Hartford Athletic (loan)	2019	USL Championship	7	0	—		0	0	–		7	0	
San Diego Loyal SC	2020	USL Championship	14	1	—		0	0	–		14	1	
San Diego Loyal SC	2021	USL Championship	25	1	—		0	0	_		25	1	
San Diego Loyal SC	2022	USL Championship	32	1	—		0	0	_		32	1	
San Diego Loyal SC	2023	USL Championship	34	1	—		1	0	_		35	1	
San Diego Loyal SC	Total		105	4	0	0	1	0	0	0	106	4	
North Carolina FC	2024	USL Championship	36	0	—		2	0	–		38	0	
North Carolina FC	2025	USL Championship	9	0	3	0	2	0	–		14	0	
Career total			212	5	3	0	9	0	7	0	231	5	—
