= North Carolina FC =

Former American soccer club

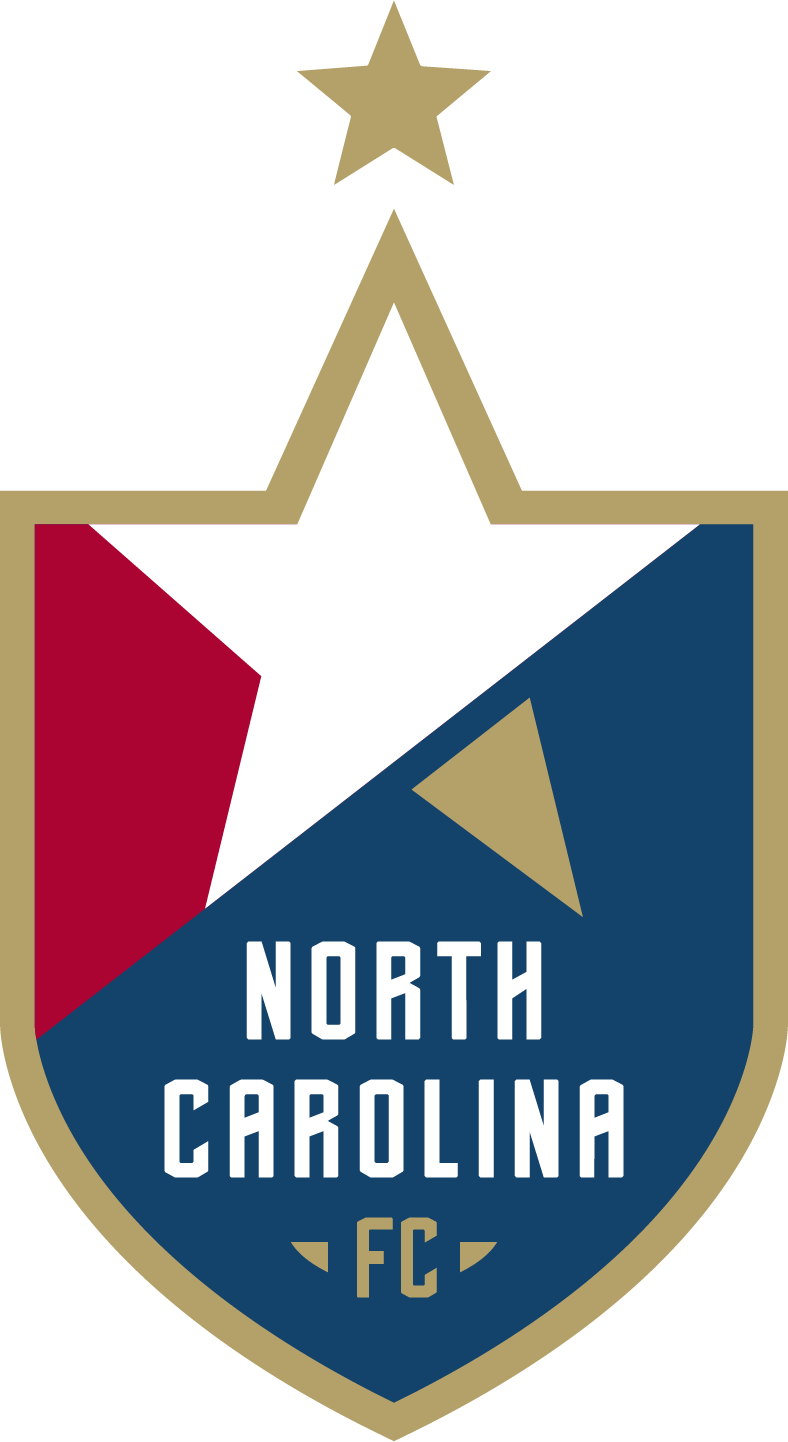
- Full name: North Carolina Football Club
- Founded: January 26, 2006; 20 years ago (as "Carolina RailHawks")
- Stadium: WakeMed Soccer Park; Cary, North Carolina
- Capacity: 10,000
- Owner: Steve Malik
- Sporting Director: John Bradford
- Head coach: John Bradford
- League: USL Championship
- 2025: 3rd, Eastern Conference; Playoffs: Conference Semifinals
- Website: northcarolinafc.com
Home colors	Away colors

North Carolina Football Club is an American professional soccer team in Cary, North Carolina, a suburb of Raleigh, and member of the United Soccer League system. Founded in 2006, the team was known as the Carolina RailHawks.

On December 6, 2016, the RailHawks announced a name change to North Carolina Football Club in pursuit of becoming a Major League Soccer franchise. The club's home attendance record had been broken earlier that year when 10,125 attended a match against West Ham United of the English Premier League.

On November 4, 2025, the club announced it was suspending operations pending an application to join the future USL Premier in 2028.

The team has played its home games at the 10,000-seat WakeMed Soccer Park since 2007. The team's colors are Atlantic blue, cardinal red, and Southern gold.

== History ==
=== Club formation and play in the USL first division ===
On January 26, 2006, the expansion of the USL to Cary, North Carolina, was announced at a press conference at SAS Soccer Park, since renamed WakeMed Soccer Park. After a few changes in the 2008 off-season, the RailHawks ownership group consisted of Wellman Family Limited partnership (Selby and Brian Wellman), HTCFC. INC (Bob Young former CEO of Red Hat, presently founder and CEO of LULU.com), Singh Holdings (Dr. H. Paul Singh) and Boris Jerkunica. After the 2010 season, Traffic Sports USA took ownership.

On October 11, 2006, former Rochester Rhinos defender Scott Schweitzer was named the first head coach of the RailHawks. Schweitzer played collegiately at North Carolina State University and retired from play prior to the 2006 season. On December 5, 2006, the RailHawks named the first players to sign with the franchise. Among the signings were two former UNC Tar Heel players, Chris Carrieri and Caleb Norkus, as well as several other players with Major League Soccer, United Soccer Leagues, and foreign playing experience.

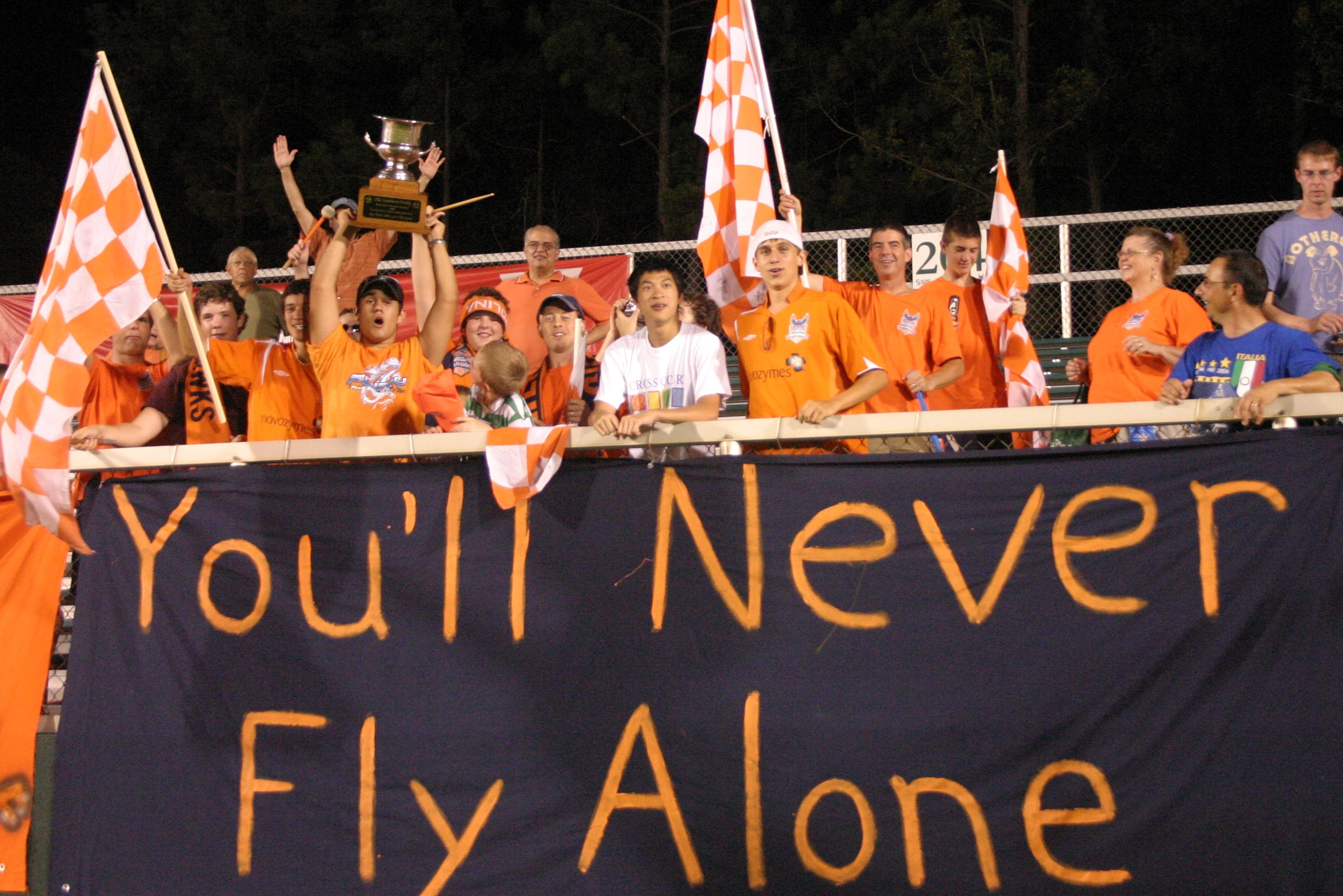
RailHawks fans celebrate their team's 2007 Southern Derby Championship on August 17, 2007, at SAS Soccer Park

The club launched their inaugural season on April 21, 2007, in front of a crowd of 6,327 at SAS Soccer Park when they drew 1–1 with the Minnesota Thunder in their first official regular season match. Midfielder Kupono Low scored the first goal in franchise history when he blasted a 24-yard left-footed shot past Thunder keeper Joe Warren in the 8th minute of the inaugural match. On May 8, 2007, the RailHawks earned their first franchise victory 2–0 against Chivas USA in an exhibition match.

On August 14, 2007, with a 3–0 victory over the Charleston Battery, the RailHawks secured their first piece of silverware, the 2007 Southern Derby Cup, with one match remaining in the contest. The RailHawks finished their first USL-1 season in 8th place in the league table, securing the league's final playoff spot on the last day of the regular season with a 2–0 victory away over fellow expansion franchise the California Victory. The RailHawks were eliminated from the playoff quarterfinals by the eventual league champion Seattle Sounders.

=== Move to the NASL ===
In November 2009 the RailHawks announced their intent to leave the USL First Division to become the co-founders of a new North American Soccer League, which would begin play in 2010. The league, which had yet to be sanctioned by the United States Soccer Federation or the Canadian Soccer Association, also comprised the Atlanta Silverbacks, Crystal Palace Baltimore, Miami FC, Minnesota Thunder, Montreal Impact, Tampa Bay Rowdies, Vancouver Whitecaps and a brand new team led by St. Louis Soccer United.

After lawsuits were filed and heated press statements exchanged, the USSF declared they would sanction neither league for the coming year, and ordered both to work together on a plan to temporarily allow their teams to play a 2010 season. The interim solution was announced on January 7, 2010, with the USSF running the new USSF D-2 league comprising clubs from both USL-1 and NASL. The RailHawks reached the final of the USSF D-2 playoffs, but fell to the Puerto Rico Islanders. After the 2010 season, the NASL and USL split, but the RailHawks faced sale by Selby Wellman on December 31, 2010. The RailHawks name was sold on eBay and was purchased by Traffic Sports USA, who assumed operations of the club. The NASL received provisional sanctioning in 2011 and full sanctioning in 2012.

The RailHawks won the regular season in 2011 but fell to the NSC Minnesota Stars in the semifinals of playoffs. The club hired Colin Clarke as coach after Martin Rennie left for the Vancouver Whitecaps. In 2012, the RailHawks finished 4th in the regular season and fell to the Tampa Bay Rowdies in the playoff semifinals, while reaching the fourth round of the US Open Cup.

In 2013 the NASL's format changed to a split season, and though the RailHawks finished with the most points in the league, they finished 2nd in both the Spring and Fall seasons and did not make the Soccer Bowl. However, they defeated MLS teams LA Galaxy and Chivas USA to advance to the quarterfinals of the US Open Cup. In 2014, the RailHawks again defeated Chivas USA and Los Angeles Galaxy to reach quarterfinals of the US Open Cup, but fell just short of reaching the NASL playoffs.

In 2015, the club saw a change in ownership as local businessman Steve Malik took over the team from Traffic Sports. During a press conference on October 30, 2015, the ambitious local owner said, "Our goal is to take the RailHawks to the highest level through additional investment in marketing, players and staffing. We are excited to lead our community in working together to give the Triangle a world-class soccer team."

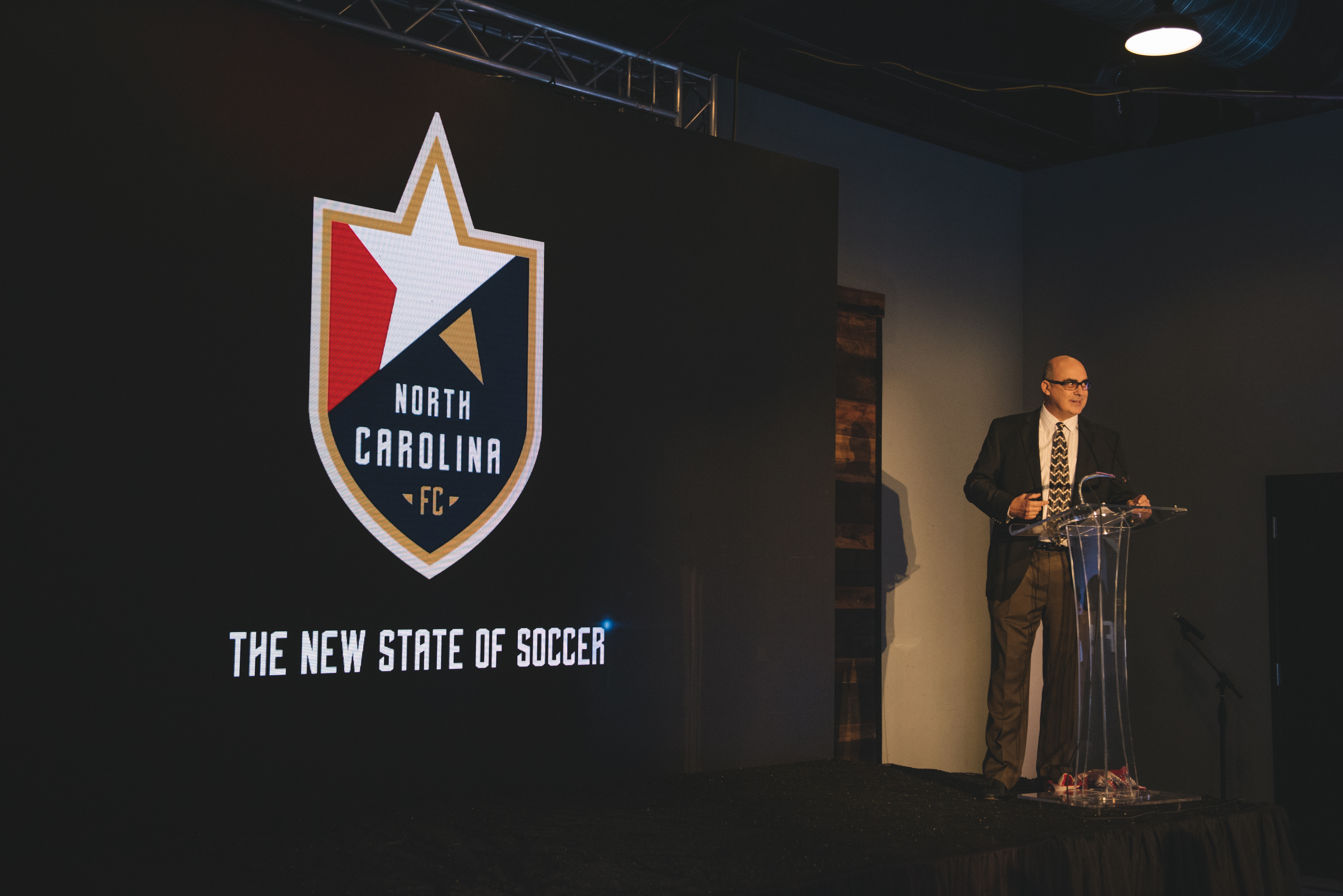
North Carolina FC owner Steve Malik announces The New State of Soccer on December 6, 2016

New faces in the front office were matched with the new faces on the field. The RailHawks had a big year in 2016 with the addition of forwards Omar Bravo and Matt Fondy. Bravo, the biggest signing in club history, provided senior leadership and immense experience to the team, as he left C.D. Guadalajara as the team's all-time leading scorer. Though the RailHawks missed the playoffs again, with a 7W-5D-10L record, they again made an impressive Open Cup run, reaching the fourth round where they lost a tight 1–0 game to the New England Revolution of MLS. In the third round, the RailHawks eliminated the Charlotte Independence with a 5–0 win that saw Carolina score five extra-time goals in the thrilling match. The score set a US Open Cup record for the most goals scored by a single team in extra time.

Also in 2016, West Ham United became the first Premier League team to visit the Triangle region of North Carolina when they came to WakeMed Soccer Park on July 12, 2016. The game ended in a 2–2 draw in front of a record-breaking crowd of 10,125.

=== Return to the USL ===
On November 16, 2017, the club announced it would be leaving the NASL to join the USL for the 2018 season. The club announced, on October 17, 2018, that head coach Colin Clarke would not be returning to the club after seven seasons and that the club has begun searching for a new head coach.

Dave Sarachan, the former U.S. Men's National Team coach, was named as the fourth head coach in club history on December 17, 2018. They clinched a spot in the USL Championship Playoffs on September 30, 2019.

=== Drop to USL League One ===
On January 10, 2021, club chairman Steve Malik announced that the club would make a "strategic move" to USL League One, the third-division of the United States soccer league system. Along with the move to USL League One, coach Dave Sarachan and North Carolina parted ways. In their final season in USL League One, North Carolina FC defeated rivals Charlotte Independence on penalties 1-1 (5-4) to win the 2023 USL League One Finals, securing their first title in franchise history.

=== Return to USL Championship ===
On August 7, 2023, the club announced they were exercising their option to rejoin the USL Championship beginning in the 2024 season. In their two seasons back in the USL Championship, North Carolina FC experienced moderate success, with their first season back in second division soccer seeing the club achieve the eighth seed and making the playoffs, and the 2025 season seeing North Carolina FC achieve the third seed in the Eastern Conference, achieving a home playoff spot, and making the Eastern Conference Semi-Finals.

=== Adjourning of operations ===
On November 4, 2025, the club announced that they would not be fielding a team in 2026, to focus on being ready to launch a USL Premier team by the time that league launches in 2028. USL Players Association Executive Director Connor Tobin criticized the move, arguing that North Carolina FC's shutdown fits a wider pattern of instability in the USL. He stated that when clubs fold, players are left to absorb the consequences, receiving only two months of salary and facing immediate housing insecurity. Tobin also noted that international players experience additional uncertainty, as their immigration status can be threatened once their employment ends.

== Colors and badge ==
The flag of North Carolina was the main inspiration for the club's colors and logo

The North Carolina FC badge features elements from the flag of North Carolina. The lower right point of the star represents the Research Triangle, a geographical region that includes Chapel Hill, Durham, and Raleigh. The initials "FC" (Football Club) lies between two airplane wings, alluding to North Carolina's official slogan: "First in Flight." NCFC's primary colors include "Atlantic blue", "cardinal red", and "Southern gold".

=== Sponsorship ===
Period	Kit manufacturer	Shirt sponsor
2007–2008	Umbro	Novozymes
2009–2013	Umbro	BlueCross BlueShield of NC
2013–2016	Adidas	BlueCross BlueShield of NC
2017–2018	Adidas	Circle K
2019	Adidas	Aetna
2020	Adidas	Dreamville Festival Aetna
2021–2023	Adidas	WakeMed Dreamville Festival
2024	Adidas	EmergeOrtho
2025	Charly	EmergeOrtho

== Stadium ==
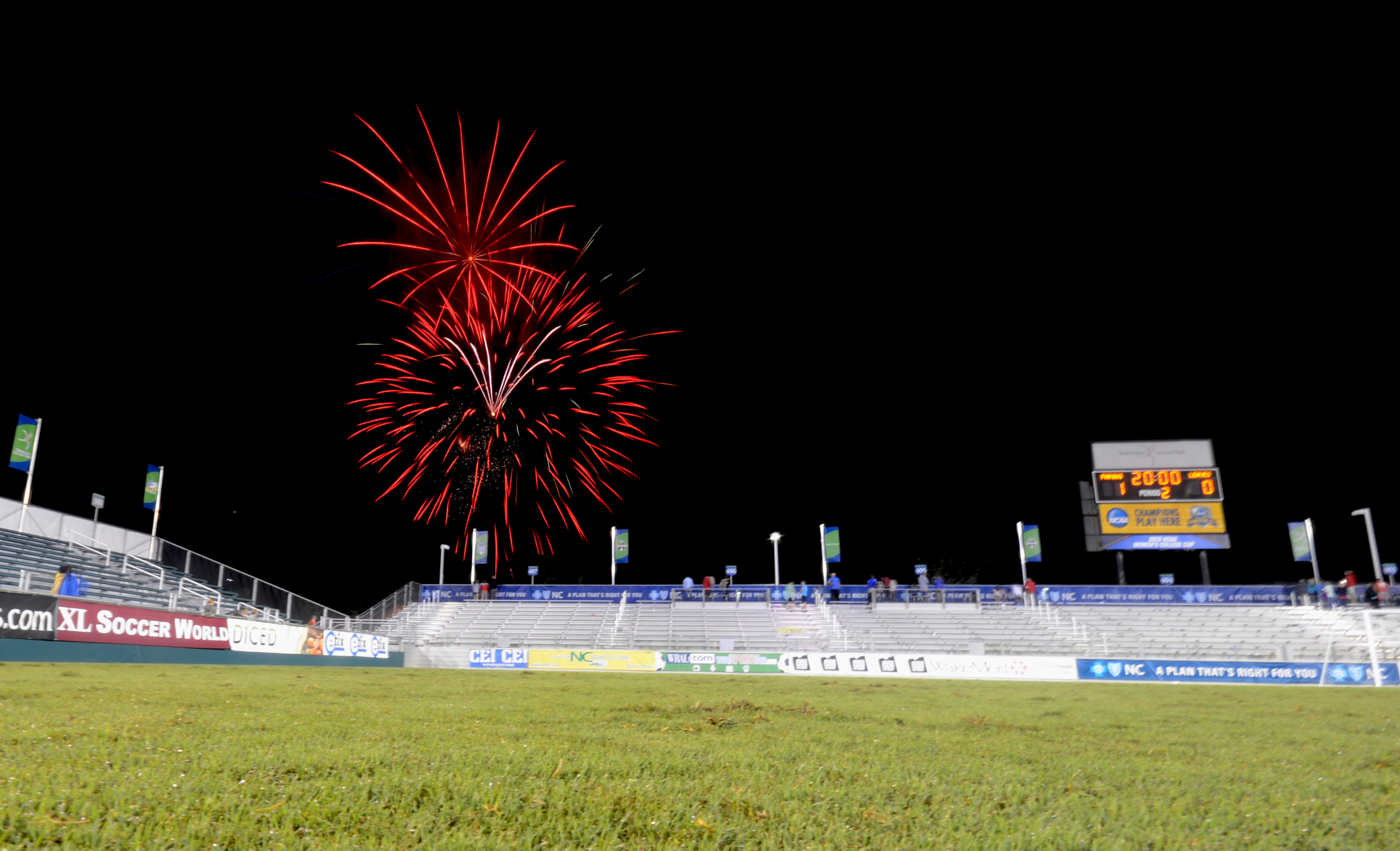
WakeMed Soccer Park. Credit: Rob Kinnan- Carolina RailHawks

- WakeMed Soccer Park; Cary, North Carolina (2007–present)

North Carolina FC play their home games at WakeMed Soccer Park (formerly known as SAS Soccer Park), a soccer-specific stadium shared by the North Carolina Courage, a team in the National Women's Soccer League also owned by Steve Malik.

The soccer complex consists of a purpose-built main stadium, two lighted practice fields, and four additional fields. The main stadium and the 2 lighted fields (2 & 3) are all FIFA international regulation size (120 yards x 75 yards). The main stadium seats 10,000 with the expansions of 2012. Field 2 also has 1,000 permanent bleacher seats.

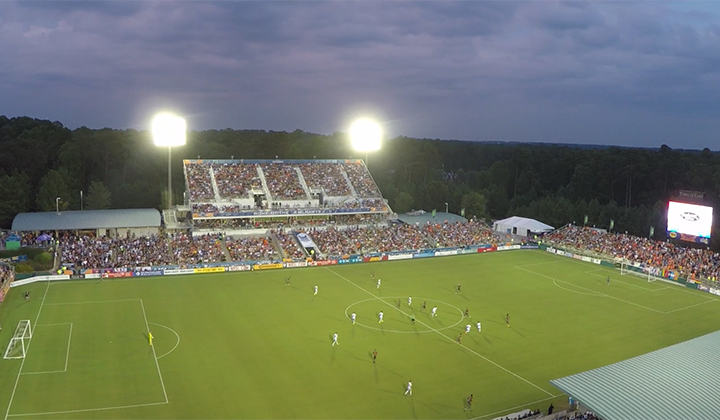
WakeMed Soccer Park during the match between the Carolina RailHawks (now North Carolina FC) and West Ham United

The park is on 150 acres (0.61 km^{2}) that the State of North Carolina has leased to Wake County. Money to build the soccer park came from $14.5 million in county-wide hotel room and prepared food and beverage taxes. The Town of Cary assumed responsibility for operations and maintenance in 2004 from the then Capital Area Soccer League, now North Carolina FC Youth. On January 26, 2006, the Town of Cary council amended its lease to allow it to sublet the property to Triangle Professional Soccer through the year 2011 for the exclusive promotion of professional soccer and lacrosse events at the complex. This deal was extended for the new ownership group through 2014.

On December 6, 2016, along with a name change, North Carolina FC announced plans for a stadium seating 24,000.

On July 13, 2018, the Daily Commercial News reported that the team is planning a $750 million stadium complex.

Sahlen Packing Company acquired naming rights to the main stadium at WakeMed Soccer Park on March 31, 2017, thus becoming Sahlen's Stadium. Sahlen's paid $400,000 over five years for the rights, with $100,000 going to the town of Cary and the rest to the North Carolina Courage organization. On April 30, 2021, WakeMed renewed the agreement through 2023.

== Club culture ==
=== Rivalries ===
==== Charleston Battery and Atlanta Silverbacks ====
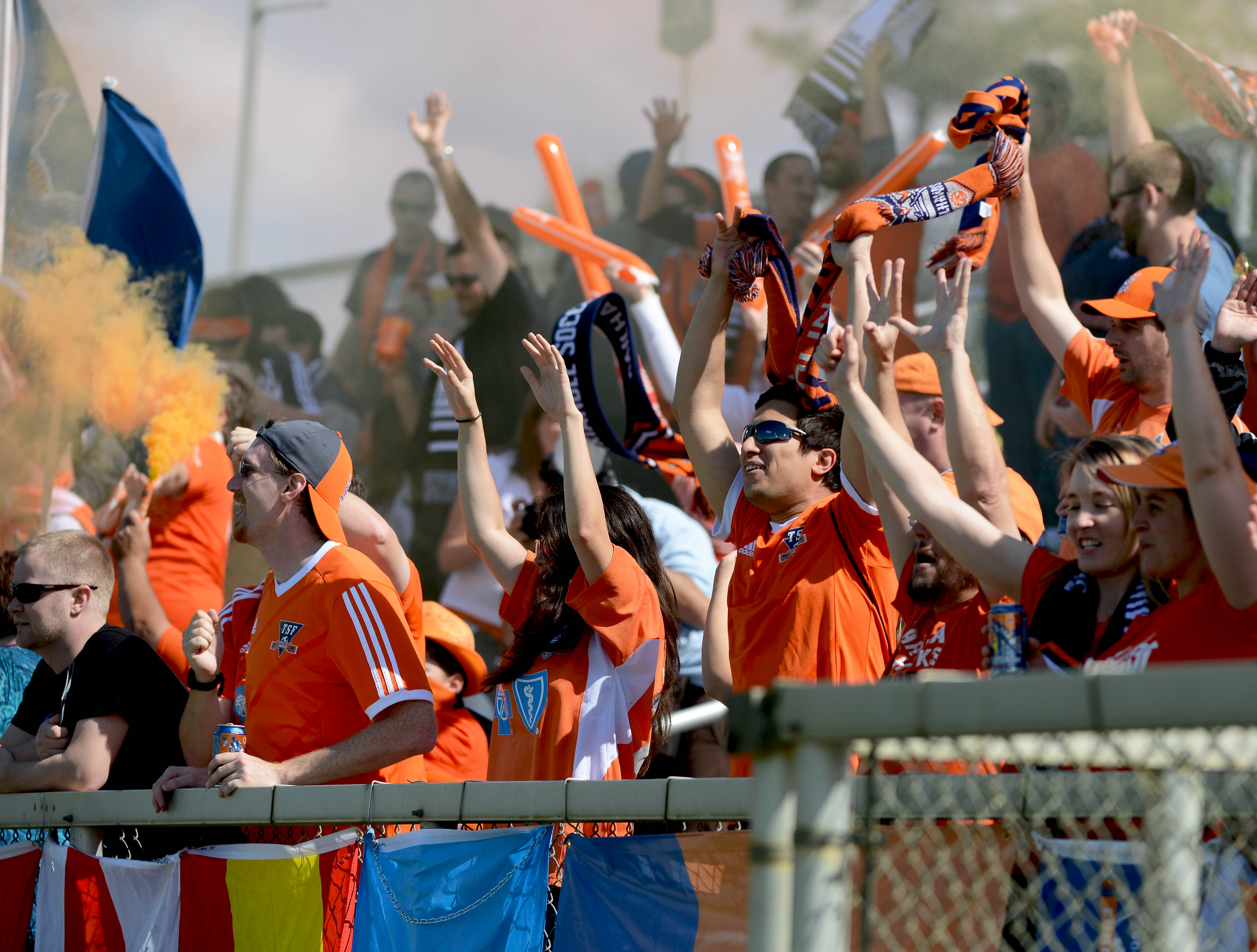
Carolina RailHawks (now North Carolina FC) fans cheer on their team at WakeMed Soccer Park in Cary, NC

Upon entering the USL First Division, the RailHawks also joined the Southern Derby, renewing a rivalry first started in 2000 between supporters of the Charleston Battery, Atlanta Silverbacks, and the Raleigh Express. By winning the Southern Derby Cup in their inaugural season, the RailHawks became the first Triangle-area team to hold the Cup since 2000 when Raleigh won the cup 3–1–0 over the Silverbacks and Battery in the Derby's first season.

The rivalry between the three clubs was further fueled by the fact that former RailHawks coach Scott Schweitzer earned a reputation among Battery supporters as the defender they loved to hate during his time as a player for Rochester Rhinos and current Atlanta Silverbacks owner Boris Jerkunica had a partial ownership stake in the RailHawks franchise.

With North Carolina FC moving to the USL for the 2018 season, old rivalries with Charleston, Charlotte Independence, and Richmond Kickers will be reborn, along with potential new geographical rivalries with expansion clubs Nashville SC and Atlanta United 2.

==== Rochester Rhinos ====
A rivalry developed between the RailHawks and Rochester Rhinos due to the close financial and player ties between the two organizations. Former RailHawks GM Chris Economides held the same position with the Rhinos before departing for Cary, and former Rhinos President Frank DuRoss and former CEO Steve Donner were part of the original ownership group. In addition, former RailHawks coach Scott Schweitzer was a captain and fan favorite of the Rhinos, and onetime RailHawks players Frank Sanfilippo and Connally Edozien were once Rhinos players. This rivalry has cooled ever since the two teams joined different leagues.

==== Puerto Rico Islanders ====
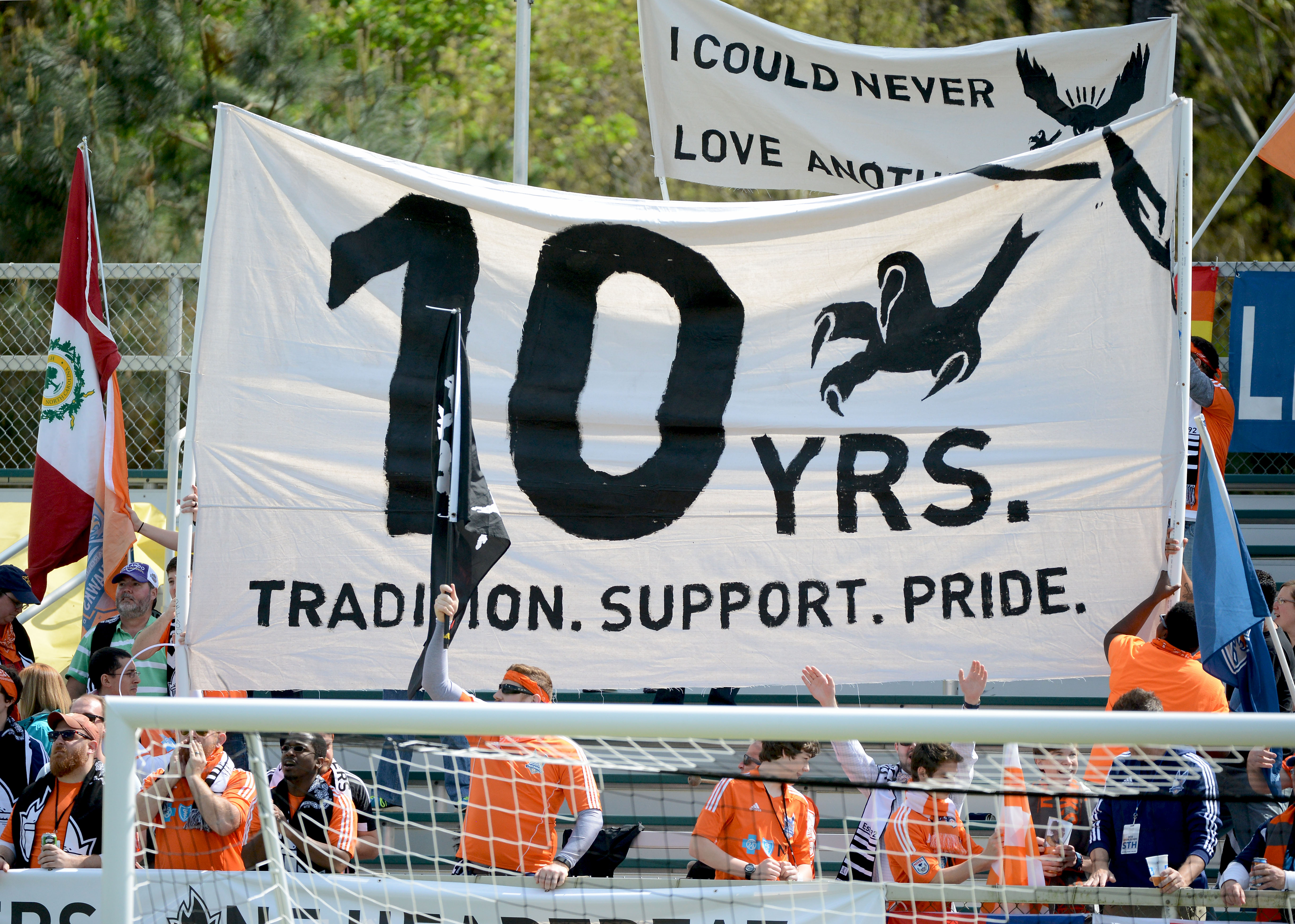
The Carolina RailHawks (now North Carolina FC) celebrated their 10-year anniversary in 2016

The Carolina RailHawks and Puerto Rico Islanders had a rivalry brewing among the two clubs. Although Islanders supporters were not pleased when the RailHawks revealed orange and blue kit colors (selected because the combination is not used by any other Triangle area sports teams, although coincidentally the same colors sported by the Islanders), the rivalry begun in earnest when Islanders President Andrés Guillemard-Noble accused the RailHawks of piracy in the signing of Islanders' free agent Caleb Norkus.

While the club executive insists that the Islanders had a verbal agreement with Norkus to return to Puerto Rico for the 2007 season, the player refutes that accusation, saying the two sides never reached terms and cites the lack of an offered written contract as evidence of their lack of agreement. This rivalry has died since the Islanders ceased operations.

=== Supporters ===
North Carolina FC has two independent supporter groups, the Oak City Supporters and Renegados Soccer Supporters.

== Players and staff ==
=== Roster ===
As of August 16, 2025

Note: Flags indicate national team as defined under FIFA eligibility rules; some limited exceptions apply. Players may hold more than one non-FIFA nationality.

No.	Pos.	Nation	Player
1	GK	USA	Jake McGuire
6	MF	USA	Thomas Roberts
7	FW	USA	Evan Conway
8	MF	BRA	Pedro Dolabella
9	FW	VIN	Oalex Anderson
10	MF	PUR	Jaden Servania
11	DF	MTQ	Patrick Burner
13	MF	FRA	Louis Perez
14	DF	BRA	Rafa Mentzingen
15	MF	USA	Mikey Maldonado
16	MF	BRA	Rodrigo da Costa
17	MF	USA	Collin Martin
19	MF	PLE	Ahmad Al-Qaq

No.	Pos.	Nation	Player
20	DF	USA	Conor Donovan
22	GK	GER	Oliver Semmle (on loan from Philadelphia Union)
23	DF	USA	Jahlane Forbes (on loan from Charlotte FC)
24	GK	USA	Trevor Mulqueen
25	GK	JPN	Akira Fitzgerald
26	FW	USA	Adam Luckhurst
27	DF	USA	Bryce Washington
30	FW	ESA	Raúl Ávalos
42	DF	USA	Ezra Armstrong
44	MF	SKN	Raheem Somersall
55	DF	TTO	Triston Hodge
66	DF	USA	Finn Sundstrom
71	MF	USA	Jayson Quintanilla

USL Academy Contract

=== Out on loan ===
Note: Flags indicate national team as defined under FIFA eligibility rules; some limited exceptions apply. Players may hold more than one non-FIFA nationality.

No.	Pos.	Nation	Player
4	DF	SEN	Justin Malou (on loan to South Georgia Tormenta)

=== Staff ===
As of December 19, 2023

- (United States) John Bradford – sporting director & head coach
- (United States) Mike McGinty – assistant coach
- (United States) Andrew Scheck – assistant coach

=== Head coaches ===
- (United States) Scott Schweitzer (2007–2008)
- (Scotland) Martin Rennie (2009–2011)
- (Northern Ireland) Colin Clarke (2012–2018)
- (United States) Dave Sarachan (2019–2020)
- (United States) John Bradford (2021–present)

== Achievements ==
- USL League One Playoffs
  - Champions: 2023
- North American Soccer League
  - Winners (Supporters Cup) (2): 2011, 2013
- USL First Division
  - Runner-up (Regular Season) (1): 2009
- USSF Division 2 Professional League
  - Runner-up (Playoffs) (1): 2010
  - Winners, NASL Conference (1): 2010
- Minor Trophies
  - Copa Tecate (1): 2009
  - Southern Derby (3): 2007, 2008, 2009, 2018

== Record ==
=== Year-by-year ===
This is a partial list of the last five seasons completed by the club. For the full season-by-season history, see: List of North Carolina FC seasons.

Season	League											Position		Playoffs	USOC	Continental	Average attendance	Top goalscorer(s)	
Season	Div	League	Pld	W	L	D	GF	GA	GD	Pts	PPG	Conf.	Overall	Playoffs	USOC	Continental	Average attendance	Name	Goals
2021	3	USL L1	28	7	4	17	30	50	–20	25	0.89	N/A	12th	DNQ	NH	DNQ	1,741	3 players tied	4
2022	3	USL L1	30	8	16	6	35	53	–18	30	1.00	N/A	11th	DNQ	R2	DNQ	1,874	(United States) Garrett McLaughlin	14
2023	3	USL L1	32	19	7	6	58	39	+19	63	1.91	N/A	2nd	W	R2	DNQ	2,389	(Saint Vincent and the Grenadines) Oalex Anderson	17
2024	2	USLC	34	13	12	9	54	43	+11	48	1.41	8th	13th	R1	R4	DNQ	2,389	(Saint Vincent and the Grenadines) Oalex Anderson	13
2025	2	USLC	30	13	11	6	40	39	+1	45	1.50	3rd	6th	SF	R32	DNQ	2,502	(United States) Evan Conway	9

1. Avg. attendance include statistics from league matches only.
2. Top goalscorer(s) includes all goals scored in league play, playoffs, U.S. Open Cup, and other competitive matches.

== See also ==
- North Carolina Courage
- North Carolina FC U23
- North Carolina Courage U23
- North Carolina FC Youth
