= Bryce Washington (soccer) =

American soccer player (born 1998)

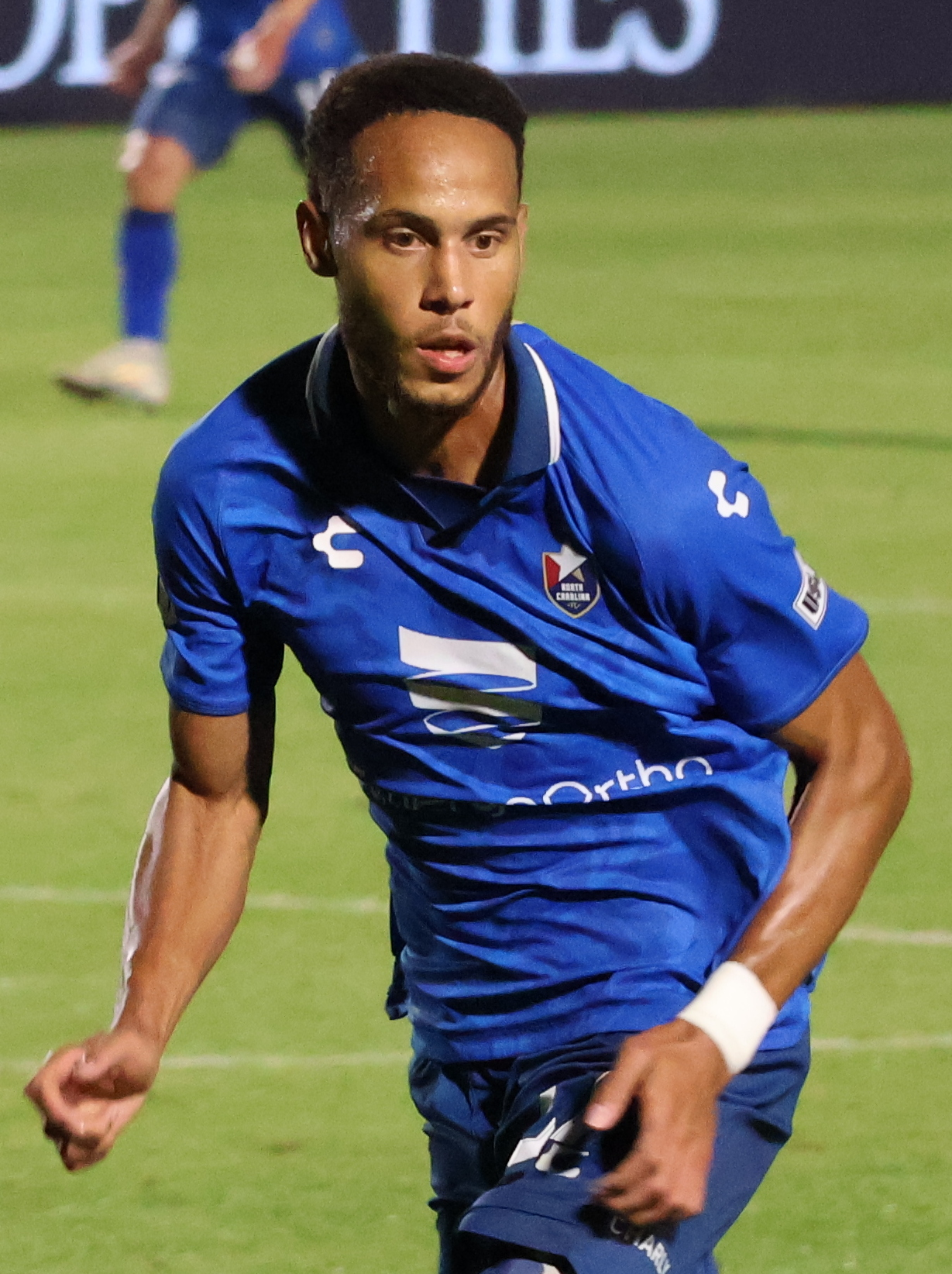
- Washington with North Carolina FC in 2025

Personal information
- Full name: Bryce Washington
- Date of birth: September 12, 1998 (age 28)
- Place of birth: Atlanta, Georgia, United States
- Height: 1.88 m (6 ft 2 in)
- Position: Defender

Team information
- Current team: Birmingham Legion
- Number: 27

Youth career
- 2016–2017: Atlanta United

College career
Years	Team	Apps	(Gls)
2017–2018	Rutgers Scarlet Knights	32	(1)
2019–2021	Pittsburgh Panthers	38	(6)

Senior career*
Years	Team	Apps	(Gls)
2021–2022	Atlanta United	0	(0)
2021–2022	Atlanta United 2	41	(0)
2023	Loudoun United	22	(0)
2024–2025	North Carolina FC	53	(0)
2026–	Birmingham Legion	20	(0)
- * Club domestic league appearances and goals as of November 2, 2026

Bryce Washington (born September 2, 1998) is an American professional soccer player who plays as a defender for USL Championship club Birmingham Legion.

== Early life and college ==
Washington was born in Atlanta, Georgia and played soccer at North Atlanta High School. He also spent a season in the youth academy of Atlanta United, appearing 30 times for the club's under-18 side and leading the side in minutes played.

In 2017, Washington began to attend Rutgers University and played college soccer for the Rutgers Scarlet Knights. After two seasons with Rutgers, Washington transferred to the University of Pittsburgh and joined the Pittsburgh Panthers. In his first season, Washington appeared in 18 matches as he helped lead the side to their first NCAA College Cup appearance. In 2021, due to the COVID-19 pandemic, the college season was extended and Washington decided to remain with the team.

== Career ==
=== Atlanta United ===
On June 4, 2021, Washington joined Major League Soccer club Atlanta United, signing as a homegrown player. He made his professional debut for the club's reserve affiliate, Atlanta United 2, on June 16 in their 1–0 away defeat against Memphis 901. Washington's contract option was declined by Atlanta following the 2022 season.

=== Loudoun United ===
On January 20, 2023, Washington signed with USL Championship side Loudoun United.

== Career statistics ==
As of match played August 22, 2021

Appearances and goals by club, season and competition
Club	Season	League			National cup		Continental		Other		Total	
Club	Season	Division	Apps	Goals	Apps	Goals	Apps	Goals	Apps	Goals	Apps	Goals
Atlanta United	2021	Major League Soccer	0	0	0	0	—		0	0	0	0
Atlanta United 2	2021	USL Championship	13	0	—		—		—		13	0
Career total			13	0	0	0	0	0	0	0	13	0
