= Ezra Armstrong =

American soccer player (born 1998)

Personal information
- Full name: Ezra Hanani Armstrong
- Date of birth: December 15, 1998 (age 27)
- Place of birth: Gastonia, North Carolina, U.S.
- Height: 1.75 m (5 ft 9 in)
- Positions: Defender; midfielder

Team information
- Current team: Loudoun United
- Number: 12

Youth career
- Sporting Nashville Heroes
- 2014–2016: Sporting Kansas City

Senior career*
Years	Team	Apps	(Gls)
2016	Swope Park Rangers	2	(0)
2018	FC Columbus	11	(3)
2018–2019	Türkspor Augsburg	25	(3)
2019–2020	Skovshoved IF	1	(0)
2021	Pittsburgh Riverhounds	14	(0)
2022–2023	St. Louis City 2	38	(0)
2024–2025	North Carolina FC	33	(5)
2026–	Loudoun United	0	(0)
- * Club domestic league appearances and goals as of October 31, 2026

Ezra Armstrong (born December 15, 1998) is an American professional soccer player who plays as a defender for Loudoun United in the USL Championship.

== Career ==
Armstrong signed to Sporting Kansas City's United Soccer League affiliate side Swope Park Rangers from their academy on March 10, 2016.

In 2018, Armstrong joined German 6th-tier side Türkspor Augsburg.

Armstrong signed to Skovshoved IF in the fall of 2019.

On February 15, 2021, Armstrong returned to the United States, joining USL Championship side Pittsburgh Riverhounds.

On February 7, 2022, Armstrong joined MLS Next Pro side St. Louis City 2 ahead of the league's inaugural season.

Armstrong moved to USL Championship club North Carolina FC on 15 December 2023.

== Personal ==
Ezra is the son of former United States international Desmond Armstrong.
