= Justin Malou =

Senegalese footballer (born 1998)

Personal information
- Date of birth: 1 June 1998 (age 28)
- Place of birth: Kédougou, Senegal
- Height: 1.80 m (5 ft 11 in)
- Position: Defender

Team information
- Current team: CT United FC
- Number: 20

Youth career
- 2016–2017: Montverde Academy

College career
Years	Team	Apps	(Gls)
2017–2021	Clemson Tigers	90	(2)

Senior career*
Years	Team	Apps	(Gls)
2017	SIMA Águilas	10	(0)
2022	Columbus Crew 2	19	(1)
2023	FC Tulsa	23	(0)
2024–2025	North Carolina FC	24	(2)
2025	→ Tormenta FC (loan)	6	(0)
2026–	CT United FC	0	(0)
- * Club domestic league appearances and goals as of 11 September 2025

Justin Malou (born 1 June 1998) is a Senegalese footballer who plays as a defender for MLS Next Pro club CT United FC.

== Early life and career ==
Malou, born in Kédougou in Senegal, moved to the United States to attended the Montverde Academy in the summer of 2016. In 2017, Malou also played in the USL PDL with SIMA Águilas, Montverde's affiliate team, making ten appearances and finishing the season with a single assist.

After graduating in 2017, Malou committed to playing college soccer at Clemson University. Over five seasons with the Tigers, including a truncated 2020 season due to the COVID-19 pandemic, Malou made 90 appearances, scoring two goals and tallying eight assists. Malou helped the team win the 2020 ACC Tournament as well as reach the quarterfinals of the 2019 NCAA Tournament. In 2020, he was named ACC All-Tournament Team.

On 21 January 2021, Malou was selected 27th overall in the 2021 MLS SuperDraft by Columbus Crew. Malou was offered the chance to play another season at Clemson in 2021, which he opted for instead of immediately signing with Columbus.

== Professional career ==
=== Columbus Crew 2 ===
On 25 February 2022, Malou signed with Columbus Crew 2 ahead of their inaugural season in the MLS Next Pro.

=== FC Tulsa ===
On 13 December 2022, Malou was acquired by USL Championship side FC Tulsa.

=== North Carolina FC ===
Malou joined North Carolina FC in December 2023, ahead of the club's return to the USL Championship.

==== Loan to Tormenta FC ====
On 11 September 2025, North Carolina loaned Malou to USL League One side Tormenta FC.
