= John Bradford (soccer) =

American soccer coach

Personal information
- Date of birth: March 26, 1980 (age 46)
- Place of birth: Winston-Salem, North Carolina, U.S.
- Height: 6 ft 1 in (1.85 m)
- Position: Defender

Team information
- Current team: North Carolina FC (head coach)

College career
Years	Team	Apps	(Gls)
1998–2001	Furman Paladins		

Senior career*
Years	Team	Apps	(Gls)
2020	North Carolina FC	0	(0)

International career
1999	United States U17		

Managerial career
- 2002–2005: Dallas Texans (assistant coach)
- 2003–2005: UT Permian Basin (assistant)
- 2006–2021: North Carolina FC (assistant)
- 2021–: North Carolina FC
- * Club domestic league appearances and goals

John Bradford (born March 26, 1980) is an American soccer coach and former player who serves as the head coach of USL Championship club North Carolina FC.

== Playing career ==
Bradford played college soccer at Furman University between 1998 and 2001.

In July 2020, aged 40 years old, Bradford signed his first professional contract for North Carolina FC due to an injury crisis.

== Coaching career ==
After college, Bradford was invited to be an assistant coach with Dallas Texans Soccer Club, where he stayed in the role for three years.

=== North Carolina FC ===
Bradford returned to North Carolina to work with the Capital Area Soccer League, now known as North Carolina FC Youth. Following fourteen years working as an assistant coach and academy director for the club, he was eventually handed the head coach role in January 2021, taking charge of the USL League One side. On June 9, 2022, Bradford was named USL League One Coach of the Month for May 2022. On June 15, 2022, North Carolina announced Bradford had signed a multi-year contract extension. On November 5, 2023, Bradford led his team to victory in the 2023 USL League One Final, securing the first championship in the club's history.
