= Mikey Maldonado =

American soccer player (born 1998)

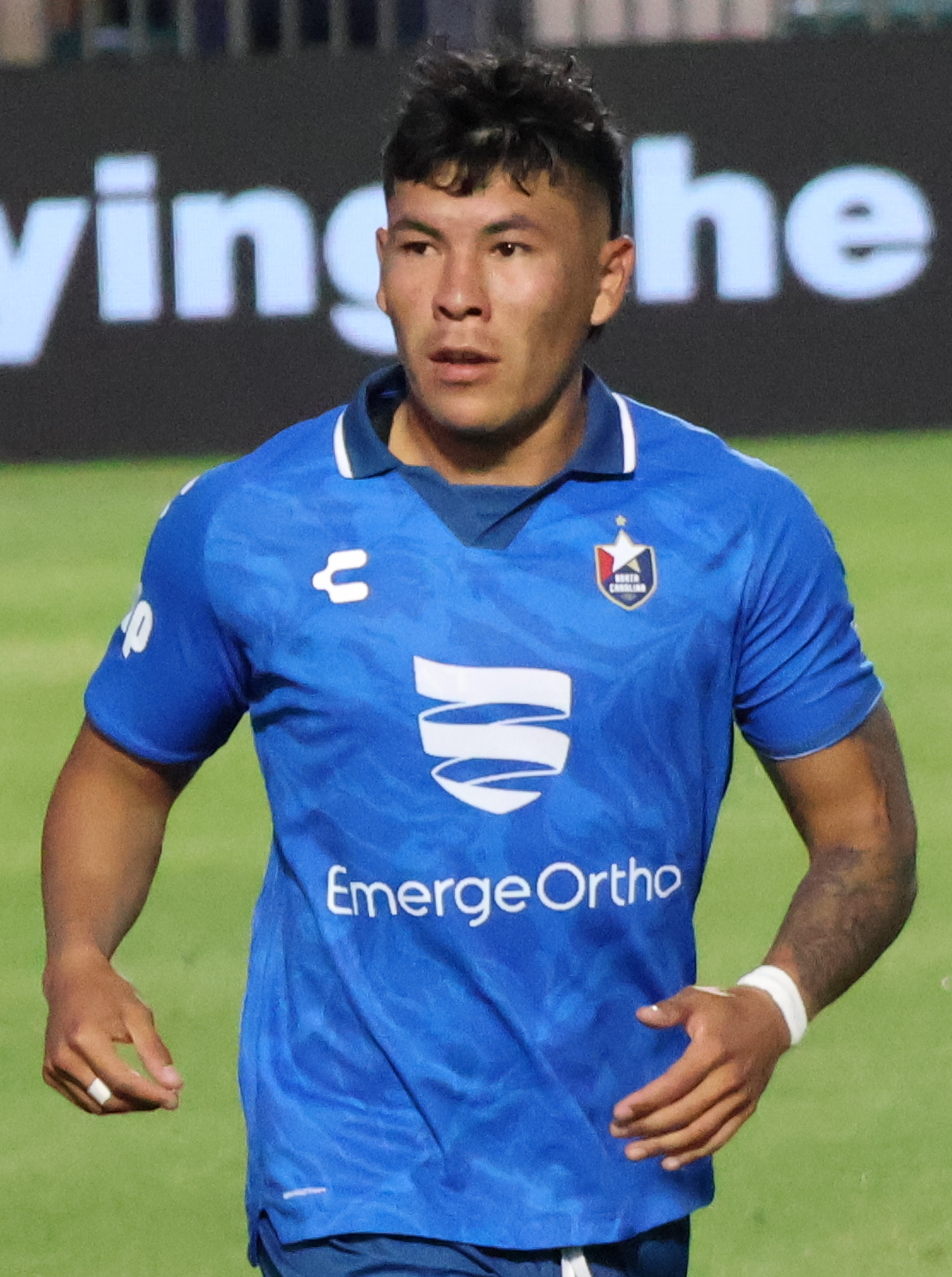
- Maldonado with North Carolina FC in 2025

Personal information
- Full name: Michael Maldonado
- Date of birth: July 2, 1998 (age 28)
- Place of birth: San Antonio, Texas, United States
- Height: 5 ft 9 in (1.75 m)
- Positions: Defender; defensive midfielder

Team information
- Current team: San Antonio FC
- Number: 15

Youth career
- San Antonio Surf

Senior career*
Years	Team	Apps	(Gls)
2019–2020	San Antonio Runners		
2021–2022	North Texas SC	26	(0)
2022	Forward Madison	28	(2)
2023–2025	North Carolina FC	92	(5)
2026–	San Antonio FC	29	(0)
- * Club domestic league appearances and goals as of October 31, 2026

Michael "Mikey" Maldonado (born July 2, 1998) is an American professional soccer player who plays for USL Championship club San Antonio FC.

== Playing career ==
=== San Antonio Runners SC ===
Maldonado spent two seasons with UPSL side San Antonio Runners SC in 2019 and 2020.

=== North Texas SC ===
Maldonado was signed by USL League One side North Texas SC on March 26, 2021. He had attended the club's 2021 open tryout in January and was one of four players invited to participate in the team's preseason training camp. He became the second player to be signed from the club's open tryouts after Bernard Kamungo. He made his professional debut on April 24, 2021, starting in a 4–2 win over Fort Lauderdale CF.

=== Forward Madison FC ===
On March 14, 2022, Forward Madison FC, also of USL League One, announced they had signed Maldonado for the 2022 season, indicating he could play right back, center back or central midfield. Maldonado was named to the 2022 USL League One All-League Second Team in October 2022.

=== North Carolina FC ===
Maldonado signed with North Carolina FC on January 6, 2023.

=== San Antonio FC ===
Following North Carolina's decision to leave the USL Championship for the 2026 season, Maldonado joined San Antonio FC on December 9, 2025.
