= Louis Perez =

French footballer (born 1997)

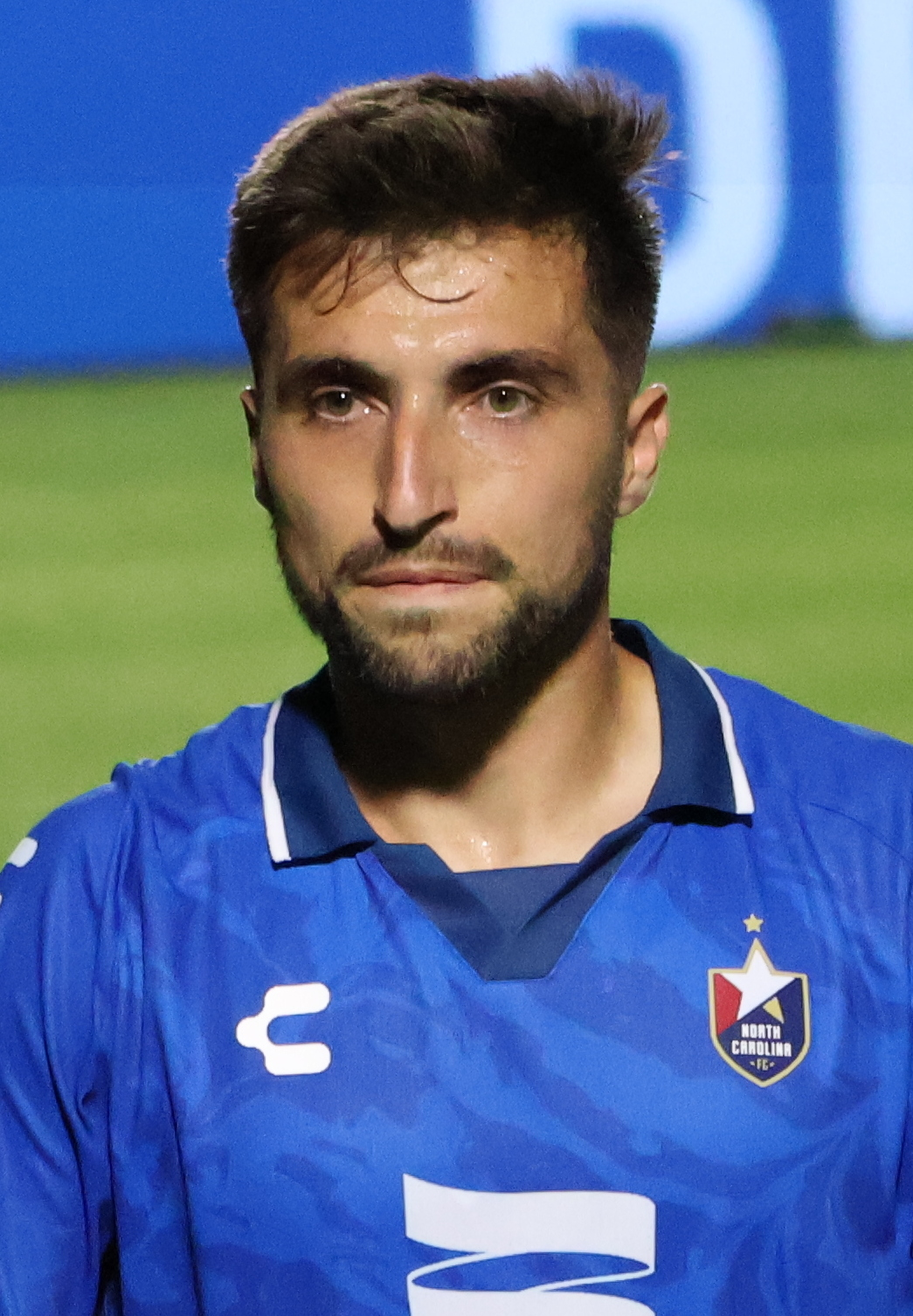
- Perez with North Carolina FC in 2025

Personal information
- Date of birth: June 11, 1997 (age 29)
- Place of birth: Paris, France
- Height: 1.82 m (6 ft 0 in)
- Position: Midfielder

Team information
- Current team: Tampa Bay Rowdies
- Number: 13

Youth career
- 2005–2007: CO Vincennes
- 2007–2011: Paris Saint-Germain
- 2011–2013: Poissy
- 2013–2014: Paris Saint-Germain
- 2014–2017: Troyes

College career
Years	Team	Apps	(Gls)
2017–2020	UCF Knights	50	(7)

Senior career*
Years	Team	Apps	(Gls)
2015–2017	Troyes II	33	(0)
2021	Pittsburgh Riverhounds	26	(2)
2022	FC Tucson	26	(5)
2023–2025	North Carolina FC	94	(12)
2026–	Tampa Bay Rowdies	29	(5)
- * Club domestic league appearances and goals as of 17:57, 8 November 2026 (UTC)

Louis Perez (born 11 June 1997) is a French professional footballer who plays as a midfielder for the Tampa Bay Rowdies in the USL Championship.

== Career ==
=== Youth ===
Perez spent time with various teams in France, including CO Vincennes, Paris Saint-Germain, AS Poissy and ESTAC Troyes, the latter of which he appeared for the club's second team in the CFA.

=== College ===
In 2017, Perez moved to the United States to play college soccer at the University of Central Florida. In three seasons with the Golden Knights, Perez made 50 appearances, scoring 7 goals and tallying 16 assists. In 2019, his last full season for UCF before the COVID-19 pandemic saw the 2020 season cancelled, Perez was the team's second-leading scorer with four goals and 11 assists, which was one-off a school single-season record. Perez's 11 assists were fourth in the NCAA and led Perez to be named as second-team All-American Athletic Conference. In 2018, Perez was named the AAC Midfielder of the Year and a third-team All-American by the United Soccer Coaches, helping UCF to the AAC regular-season title.

=== Professional ===
On 17 February 2021, Perez signed his first professional contract, joining USL Championship side Pittsburgh Riverhounds. Perez made his professional debut on May 8, 2021, appearing as a 61st-minute substitute in a 3–0 loss to Tampa Bay Rowdies.

On 3 February 2022, Perez made the move to USL League One side FC Tucson.

Following Tucson's voluntary relegation to USL League Two, Perez signed with USL League One club North Carolina FC.
