= Jake McGuire =

American soccer player (born 1994)

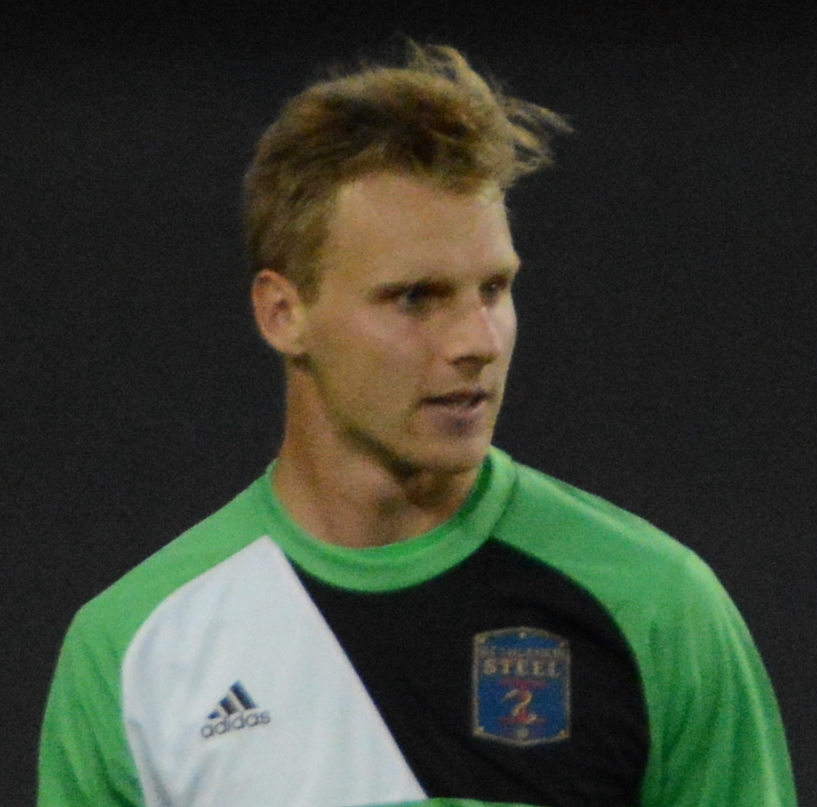
- McGuire playing for Bethlehem Steel FC in 2017

Personal information
- Date of birth: September 3, 1994 (age 32)
- Place of birth: Pomona, California, United States
- Height: 1.90 m (6 ft 3 in)
- Position: Goalkeeper

Team information
- Current team: Sporting JAX
- Number: 1

Youth career
- 2011–2012: Chivas USA

College career
Years	Team	Apps	(Gls)
2013–2016	Tulsa Golden Hurricane	67	(0)

Senior career*
Years	Team	Apps	(Gls)
2014	OC Pateadores Blues	10	(0)
2016	Portland Timbers U23s	1	(0)
2017–2018	Philadelphia Union	0	(0)
2017–2018	→ Bethlehem Steel (loan)	46	(0)
2019	Gefle	30	(0)
2020	Örebro	0	(0)
2021	North Carolina FC	21	(0)
2022–2023	Miami FC	23	(0)
2024–2025	North Carolina FC	47	(0)
2026–	Sporting JAX	15	(0)
- * Club domestic league appearances and goals as of November 7, 2026

Jake McGuire (born September 3, 1994) is an American soccer player who plays as a goalkeeper for Sporting JAX in USL Championship.

== Early life and education ==
McGuire played in the youth ranks of Major League Soccer side Chivas USA. He also trained with the Chivas USA first team.

McGuire played college soccer for the Tulsa Golden Hurricane. As a senior, he was named to the NSCAA Third-Team All-East Region and the American Athletic Conference All-Tournament Team. While at the University of Tulsa between 2013 and 2016, he started all four years, made 67 appearances, and concluded his career ranked first in career shutouts, minutes played, and games played. He tallied 17 shutouts (school record). He was on the All-Academic Team from 2014 to 2017. While at college, McGuire also appeared for Premier Development League sides OC Pateadores Blues and Portland Timbers U23s.

== Club career ==
=== Professional ===
On January 13, 2017, McGuire was selected 30th overall in the 2017 MLS SuperDraft by Houston Dynamo. While with Houston during the 2017 preseason, McGuire started a scrimmage against the Colorado Rapids (February 25), helping keep a clean sheet over 65 minutes of play. He also appeared in a friendly for Rio Grande Valley FC against the Dynamo in an intra-squad scrimmage (February 7). McGuire signed with Philadelphia Union on March 10, 2017, after his rights were waived by Houston.

=== Philadelphia Union ===
McGuire never played a league match with the Union. Throughout his career with the Union, he was listed as a substitute on 14 occasions but did not see any minutes on the pitch. However, he was in the starting lineup for a club friendly on July 15, 2017, against Swansea City.

=== Bethlehem Steel ===
McGuire made his professional debut on April 9, 2017, while on loan with the Union's United Soccer League affiliate Bethlehem Steel. McGuire played 90 minutes in a 2–0 win over FC Cincinnati. He established himself as the starting goalkeeper during his tenure with the Bethlehem Steel. He currently holds the club's record for career Saves, Shutouts, Wins, Minutes, and Games Played.

=== Gefle IF ===
On January 21, 2019, McGuire signed with Gefle IF as a free transfer competing in Division 1 Norra. He has appeared in 30 games collecting 7 clean sheets.

=== Örebro SK ===
After a successful season at Gefle IF in 2019, McGuire was offered a contract with Allsvenskan side, Örebro SK, for the 2020 season.

=== North Carolina FC ===
In March 2021, McGuire joined North Carolina FC in USL League One.

=== Miami FC ===
On January 26, 2022, McGuire joined USL Championship side Miami FC.

=== North Carolina FC ===
McGuire returned to North Carolina FC on in December 2023, ahead of the club's return to the USL Championship.

=== Sporting JAX ===
On January 22, 2026, USL Championship expansion club Sporting Club Jacksonville, commonly known as Sporting JAX, announced McGuire had joined their inaugural roster.

== International career ==
McGuire was a member of the United States under-17 national team with its residency program from 2010 to 2011 in Bradenton, FL. McGuire was a member of the United States under-20 national team in 2012.
