= Raheem Somersall =

Kittitian footballer (born 1997)

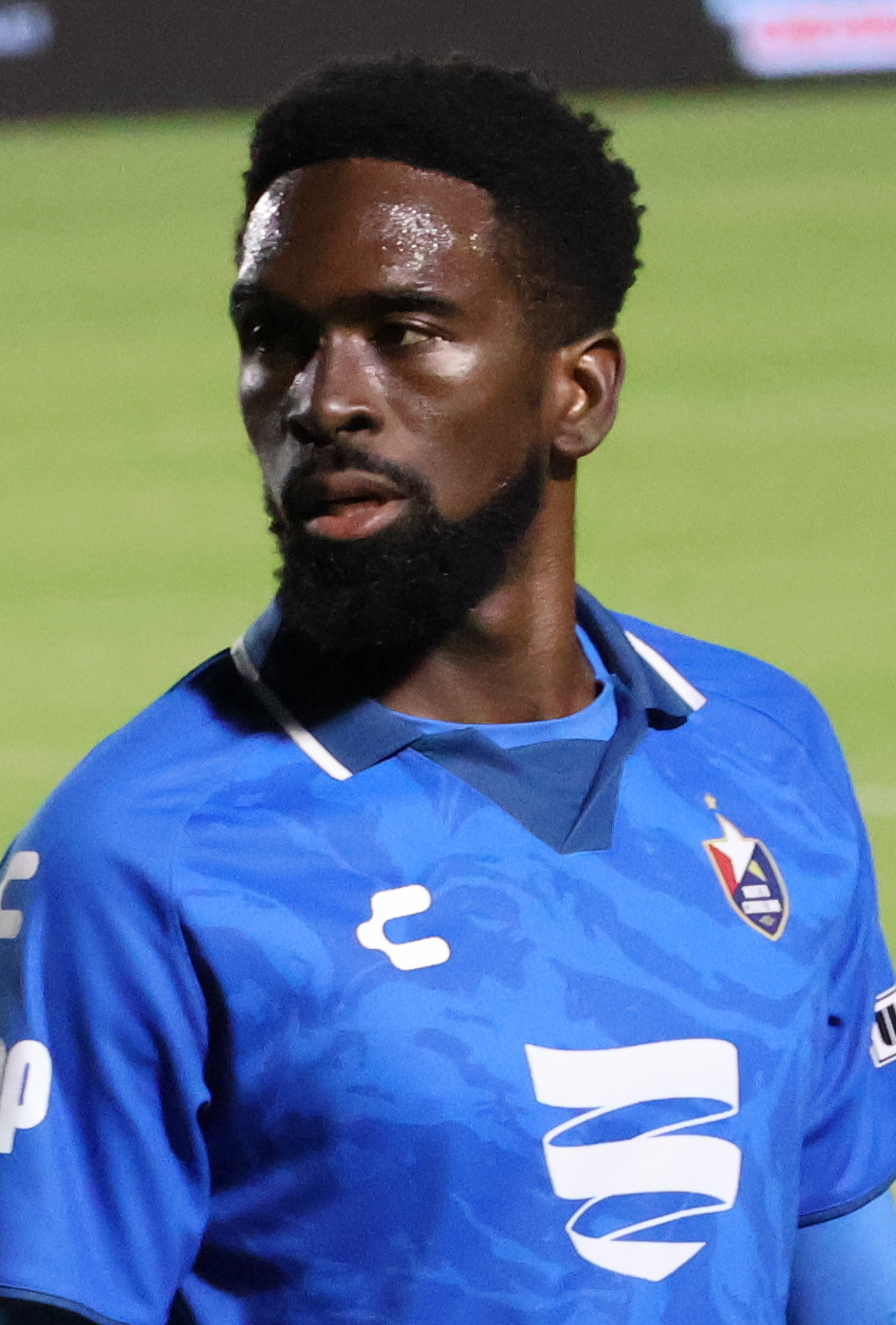
- Somersall with North Carolina FC in 2025

Personal information
- Date of birth: 5 July 1997 (age 29)
- Place of birth: Basseterre, St. Kitts and Nevis
- Height: 1.78 m (5 ft 10 in)
- Position: Midfielder

Team information
- Current team: Sporting Club Jacksonville
- Number: 44

Youth career
- Triangle Futbol Club Alliance

College career
Years	Team	Apps	(Gls)
2015–2017	Appalachian State Mountaineers	51	(1)
2018	Florida Gulf Coast Eagles	15	(0)

Senior career*
Years	Team	Apps	(Gls)
2016	Ocean City Nor'easters	9	(0)
2017	IMG Academy Bradenton	10	(0)
2019–2020	FC Tucson	20	(0)
2021	South Georgia Tormenta	20	(0)
2022–2025	North Carolina FC	94	(3)
2026	FC Tulsa	8	(0)
2026–	Sporting Club Jacksonville	13	(0)

International career^{‡}
- Saint Kitts and Nevis U20
- Saint Kitts and Nevis U23
2017–	Saint Kitts and Nevis	28	(0)
- * Club domestic league appearances and goals as of 7 November 2026 ‡ National team caps and goals as of 17 November 2026

Raheem Somersall (born 5 July 1997) is a Kittitian professional footballer who plays for USL Championship club Sporting Club Jacksonville and the Saint Kitts and Nevis national team.

== Club career ==
Somersall played collegiately at Appalachian State University and at Florida Gulf Coast University.

Somersall joined North Carolina FC on December 2, 2021.

On January 2, 2026, FC Tulsa of the USL Championship announced they had signed Somersall for the 2026 season.

Sporting Club Jacksonville announced on June 9, 2026 that they had signed Somersall to a contract to the 2026 USL Championship season.

== International career ==
At the youth level he played in the 2017 CONCACAF U-20 Championship and 2020 CONCACAF Men's Olympic Qualifying Championship qualification.

== Career statistics ==
=== Club ===
As of 1 June 2019.

Club	Season	League			Cup		Continental		Other		Total	
Club	Season	Division	Apps	Goals	Apps	Goals	Apps	Goals	Apps	Goals	Apps	Goals
Ocean City Nor'easters	2016	Premier Development League	9	0	0	0	–		1 (Note: Appearances in the Premier Development League playoffs)	0	10	0
IMG Academy	2017	Premier Development League	10	0	0	0	–		0	0	10	0
FC Tucson	2019	USL League One	6	0	0	0	–		0	0	6	0
Career total			25	0	0	0	0	0	1	0	26	0

=== International ===
As of matches played 17 November 2026

National team	Year	Apps	Goals
Saint Kitts and Nevis	2017	5	0
Saint Kitts and Nevis	2018	2	0
Saint Kitts and Nevis	2019	1	0
Saint Kitts and Nevis	2020	0	0
Saint Kitts and Nevis	2021	5	0
Saint Kitts and Nevis	2022	2	0
Saint Kitts and Nevis	2023	9	0
Saint Kitts and Nevis	2024	2	0
Saint Kitts and Nevis	2025	0	0
Saint Kitts and Nevis	2026	2	0
Total		28	0
