= Evan Conway =

American soccer player (born 1997)

Personal information
- Date of birth: November 7, 1997 (age 29)
- Place of birth: Whitefish Bay, Wisconsin, U.S.
- Height: 6 ft 1 in (1.85 m)
- Position: Forward

Team information
- Current team: Tampa Bay Rowdies
- Number: 7

College career
Years	Team	Apps	(Gls)
2016–2019	Milwaukee Panthers	77	(27)

Senior career*
Years	Team	Apps	(Gls)
2019	Ventura County Fusion	12	(9)
2020–2021	Union Omaha	32	(16)
2022–2023	San Diego Loyal	64	(19)
2024–2025	North Carolina FC	50	(21)
2026–	Tampa Bay Rowdies	25	(3)
- * Club domestic league appearances and goals as of 17:56, 8 November 2026 (UTC)

Evan Conway (born November 7, 1997) is an American soccer player who plays as a forward for USL Championship club Tampa Bay Rowdies.

== Career ==
=== Union Omaha ===
Following a successful open trial, Conway signed with USL League One side Union Omaha ahead of their inaugural season. Conway made his league debut for the club on July 25, 2020, against New England Revolution II. (Note: "New England II VS. Union Omaha 0 - 0". Soccerway.)

=== San Diego Loyal ===
On January 6, 2022, Conway moved to USL Championship side San Diego Loyal. (Note: "Evan Conway". San Diego Loyal SC. 2022-04-26.)

=== North Carolina FC ===
Conway signed with North Carolina FC in December 2023, ahead of the club's return to the USL Championship.
