= 2024 Union Omaha season =

Union Omaha
2024 season
- Owner: Gary Green
- Head coach: Dominic Casciato
- Stadium: Werner Park
- USL League One: 1st (3rd Players' Shield)
- USL1 Playoffs: Champions (2nd Playoff Championship)
- U.S. Open Cup: Round of 32
- USL Cup: Semi final
- Top goalscorer: League: Pedro Dolabella (14 goals); All: Pedro Dolabella (15 goals)
- Highest home attendance: 5,849 (11/17 v. SPO)
- Lowest home attendance: 2,135 (5/1 v. NCO)
- Average home league attendance: 3,397
- Biggest win: 4 goals (10/2 v. SPO)
- Biggest defeat: 2 goals (three times)
Home colors	Away colors

The 2024 Union Omaha season was the fifth season in the soccer team's history, and their fifth season in the third division of American soccer, USL League One. Union Omaha played the majority of their home games at Werner Park, located in Papillion, Nebraska, United States. They also played two matches in the U.S. Open Cup at Caniglia Field on the campus of the University of Nebraska at Omaha.

On January 25, the team announced their intention to build a new soccer specific stadium in the downtown riverfront area of Omaha. The team intends to move into the new stadium by the Spring of 2026.

On July 20, Brazilian Midfielder Victor "PC" Giro suddenly announced his immediate retirement from professional soccer after an 11-year career. PC would subsequently join the academy coaching staff of USL Championship club San Antonio FC as the director/head coach of their U12 program.

On October 31, Hatian Defender Mechack Jérôme, his wife, and a close relative were involved in an accidental explosion caused by propane vapors from a cooktop igniting at his home in Bellevue, Nebraska. Jérôme had been a regular in the Union Omaha lineup, featuring in 28 of the club's matches in all competitions, and the situation led to an outpouring of support from the team and fans alike. In comments following the USL League One Final, principal owner Gary Green declared that, "Nobody will ever wear number two for Union Omaha, except for Mechack," making his the second number retired for Union Omaha, and the first that had been worn by an active player.

The team secured the Players' Shield, awarded to the team with the best regular season record, for the third time in four seasons after a 3–2 victory on the road against South Georgia Tormenta FC. They won their second playoff championship by defeating Spokane Velocity 3–0 in the final, becoming the first team to win the championship twice. They also advanced to the semi-final of the inaugural USL Cup, losing to eventual champions Northern Colorado Hailstorm.

== Transfers ==
=== Transfers in ===
Date	Position	Name	From	Fee/notes	Ref.
January 9, 2024	FW	(France) Adam Aoumaich	(United States) Marshall Thundering Herd	Free	
January 9, 2024	DF	(United States) Blake Malone	(United States) Colorado Rapids 2	Free	
January 16, 2024	MF	(England) Nortei Nortey	(United States) Northern Colorado Hailstorm FC	Free	
January 30, 2024	FW	(Mexico) Aarón Gómez	(United States) El Paso Locomotive	Free	
January 30, 2024	DF	(Haiti) Mechack Jérôme	(United States) Indy Eleven	Free	
February 6, 2024	MF	(Brazil) PC	(United States) San Antonio FC	Free	
February 6, 2024	GK	(United States) Wallis Lapsley	(United States) Tacoma Defiance	Free	
February 27, 2024	MF	(United States) Brandon Knapp	(United States) St. John's Red Storm	Free	
March 5, 2024	DF	(South Sudan) Ryen Jiba	(United States) Minnesota United FC	Free	
March 6, 2024	DF	(United States) Will Perkins	(United States) Western Michigan	Free	
March 28, 2024	FW	(Bermuda) Zeiko Lewis	(United States) Sacramento Republic	Free	
June 19, 2024	DF	(Ghana) Isaac Bawa	Unattached	25-day Contract	
July 31, 2024	DF	(United States) Charlie Ostrem	(New Zealand) Western Suburbs FC	Free	

=== Loans in ===
No.	Pos.	Player	Loaned from	Start	End	Source
	FW	(United States) Missael Rodríguez	(United States) Chicago Fire FC	March 14, 2024		
	MF	(Germany) Max Schneider	(United States) Indy Eleven	July 18, 2024		

=== Transfers out ===
Date	Position	No.	Name	To	Fee/notes	Ref.
December 7, 2023	MF	8	(United States) Joe Brito	(United States) Rhode Island FC	Free	
December 12, 2023	MF	17	(United States) JP Scearce	(United States) Phoenix Rising FC	Free	
December 19, 2023	DF	28	(United States) Shaft Brewer Jr.	(United States) North Carolina FC	Free	
January 4, 2024	FW	7	(United States) Noe Meza	(United States) Memphis 901 FC	Free	
January 22, 2024	MF	20	(United States) Luis Gil	(United States) Spokane Velocity	Free	
January 29, 2024	MF	22	(United States) Conor Doyle	(United States) South Georgia Tormenta	Free	
Unknown	DF	95	(Comoros) Alexis Souahy	(United States) Spokane Velocity	Free	

=== Loans out ===
No.	Pos.	Player	Loaned to	Start	End	Source
22	DF	(United States) Will Perkins	(United States) Huntsville City FC	June 8, 2024		

== Roster ==
As of September 5, 2024

=== Current roster ===
No.	Pos.	Nation	Player
2	DF	HAI	Mechack Jérôme
3	DF	USA	Blake Malone
4	DF	ITA	Luca Mastrantonio
5	DF	ITA	Marco Milanese
7	MF	USA	Joe Gallardo
8	MF	ENG	Nortei Nortey
9	MF	BRA	Pedro Dolabella
10	FW	CPV	Steevan Dos Santos
11	FW	BER	Zeiko Lewis
13	DF	USA	Anderson Holt
15	MF	USA	Brandon Knapp
18	FW	USA	Mark Bronnik
20	DF	USA	Charlie Ostrem
21	FW	MEX	Aarón Gómez
22	MF	GER	Max Schneider
24	GK	GHA	Rashid Nuhu
26	MF	USA	Dion Acoff
27	DF	SSD	Ryen Jiba
33	FW	FRA	Adam Aoumaich
36	GK	USA	Wallis Lapsley
70	FW	USA	Lagos Kunga
77	DF	GHA	Isaac Bawa
99	FW	USA	Missael Rodríguez

1. On loan from Indy Eleven
2. On loan from Chicago Fire FC

=== Out on loan ===
Note: Flags indicate national team as defined under FIFA eligibility rules; some limited exceptions apply. Players may hold more than one non-FIFA nationality.

No.	Pos.	Nation	Player
22	DF	USA	Will Perkins (on loan to Huntsville City FC)

== Competitions ==
February 10, 2024 Preseason 1	St. Louis City 2	1–2	Union Omaha	St. Louis, Missouri
12:00 PM CST		Report		Stadium: Washington University Orthopedics High Performance Center

February 17, 2024 Preseason 2	Sporting Kansas City II	0–4	Union Omaha	Kansas City, Missouri
1:00 PM CST		Report	Mastrantonio; Gallardo; Kunga

February 21, 2024 Preseason 3	Minnesota United FC 2	1–1	Union Omaha	St Paul, Minnesota
10:30 AM CST	Trialist	Report

February 25, 2024 Preseason 4	FC Tulsa	1–1	Union Omaha	Tulsa, Oklahoma
11:00 AM CST	Goodrum 12' (pen.)	Report	Gallardo 47'

March 2, 2024 Preseason 5	Colorado Springs Switchbacks	3–2	Union Omaha	Colorado Springs, Colorado
12:00 PM CST	Henríquez 40'; Santos 84'; Andersson 90'	Report	62' 90+1'

=== Regular season ===
==== Standings ====
Pos	Team	Pld	W	L	T	GF	GA	GD	Pts	Qualification
1	(Nebraska) Union Omaha (C, S)	22	15	4	3	47	24	+23	48	Playoffs
2	Northern Colorado Hailstorm FC	22	12	5	5	34	18	+16	41	Playoffs
3	(Wisconsin) Forward Madison FC	22	10	3	9	35	18	+17	39	Playoffs
4	(South Carolina) Greenville Triumph SC	22	11	7	4	39	28	+11	37	Playoffs
5	(Tennessee) One Knoxville SC	22	9	5	8	23	16	+7	35	Playoffs

Source: USL League One
Rules for classification: 1) points; 2) total wins; 3) total goal differential; 4) total goals scored; 5) points earned against top four Conference finishers; 6) disciplinary points; 7) drawing of lots.
(C) Champions; (S) Players' Shield winner

==== Results summary ====
Overall								Home						Away					
Pld	W	D	L	GF	GA	GD	Pts	W	D	L	GF	GA	GD	W	D	L	GF	GA	GD
22	15	3	4	47	24	+23	48	7	2	2	23	10	+13	8	1	2	24	14	+10

Source: USL League One

==== Results by round ====
Round	1	2	3	4	5	6	7	8	9	10	11	12	13	14	15	16	17	18	19	20	21	22
Stadium	A	A	H	H	A	H	A	A	A	A	H	H	H	A	H	A	H	H	A	H	A	H
Result	W	W	D	W	W	L	W	L	W	W	L	D	W	L	W	W	W	W	D	W	W	W
Position	4	4	4	2	2	3	1	3	2	1	3	2	2	2	2	1	1	1	1	1	1	1

Source: USL League One
A = Away; H = Home; W = Win; D = Draw; L = Loss

==== Match results ====
March 16, 2024 1	Central Valley Fuego FC	1–2	Union Omaha	Fresno, California
7:00 PDT	John-Brown (yellow card) 33', (goal) 71'; Carrera-García (yellow card) 47'; Lawal (yellow card) 84'	Report	Malone 18'; PC (yellow card) 45'; Gómez 62'; Jérôme (yellow card) 83'	Stadium: Fresno State Soccer Stadium; Attendance: 1,000; Referee: Iryna Petrunok
Note: Limited capacity due to stadium maintenance

March 30, 2024	Chattanooga Red Wolves	P–P	Union Omaha	East Ridge, Tennessee
				Stadium: CHI Memorial Stadium
Note: Match postponed due to inadequate field conditions. Rescheduled date TBD

April 12, 2024 2	One Knoxville SC	0–1	Union Omaha	Knoxville, Tennessee
6:30 EDT	Skelton (yellow card) 45'; Calixtro (yellow card) 77'; Crisler (red card) 84'	Report	Dolabella (yellow card) 34'; Gómez (yellow card) 44'; Gallardo (yellow card) 44'; Milanese (yellow card) 50'; Jérôme (yellow card) 60'; Dos Santos 70'	Stadium: Regal Stadium; Attendance: 1,793; Referee: Benjamin Meyer
Note: Nickrod Fateh

April 20, 2024 3	Union Omaha	0–0	Charlotte Independence	Papillion, Nebraska
2:00 CDT	Kunga (yellow card) 16'; Dion Acoff (yellow card) 16'	Report	Sorenson (yellow card) 42'; Álvarez (yellow card) 82'	Stadium: Werner Park; Attendance: 2,461; Referee: Atahan Yaya

May 4, 2024 4	Union Omaha	4–2	South Georgia Tormenta	Papillion, Nebraska
7:00 CDT	Nortey 9'; Dolabella 12'; Kunga (yellow card) 54'; Milanese (yellow card) 68'; Gallardo 70'; Rodríguez 81' (yellow card) 90'	Report	Lombardi (yellow card) 28'; Vivas 45+1'; Watson (yellow card) 58'; Akoto (yellow card) 72'; Rodriguez (yellow card) 76'; Fonseca 84' (pen.)	Stadium: Werner Park; Attendance: 3,065; Referee: Aleksandar Zhelyazkov

May 18, 2024 5	Charlotte Independence	1–4	Union Omaha	Charlotte, North Carolina
7:30 EDT	Nuhu 36' (o.g.); Djedje (yellow card) 39'; Pilato (yellow card) 73'; Spielman (yellow card) 90+6'	Report	Acoff (yellow card) 12'; Mastrantonio (yellow card) 40'; Gallardo (yellow card) 43'; Dolabella 54'; Rodríguez 62', 76'; Kunga 90+4'	Stadium: American Legion Memorial Stadium; Attendance: 1,438; Referee: Joe Surgan

June 1, 2024 6	Union Omaha	1–2	Hailstorm FC	Papillion, Nebraska
7:00 CDT	Nortey (yellow card) 20'; Rodríguez (yellow card) 38' (yellow-red card) 45+7'; Dolabella 45+5'; Kunga (yellow card) 45+8'	Report	Dietrich (yellow card) 11'; Martinez (yellow card) 41'; Delgado (yellow card) 45+8'; Opara (yellow card) 45+8'; King 54'; Langlois (yellow card) 60'; Rendón 62'; Kwakwa (yellow card) 88'; Powder (yellow card) 88'	Stadium: Werner Park; Attendance: 3,977; Referee: Rafael Santos

June 5, 2024 7	Chattanooga Red Wolves	2–5	Union Omaha	East Ridge, Tennessee
7:30 EDT	Watters 18'; Ruiz (yellow card) 30'; Folla (yellow card) 41'; Lukic (yellow card) 45+1'; Chevone Marsh (yellow card) 59', (goal) 89'; Gómez-Tapia (yellow card) 90'; Bush (yellow card) 90+10'	Report	Dolabella 15'; Gómez (yellow card) 26'; Malone 29'; Gallardo 32', (yellow card) 62'; Nortey (yellow card) 48'; PC (yellow card) 53'; Nuhu (yellow card) 79'; Mastrantonio (yellow card) 80'; Kunga 90+4'; Aoumaich 90+7'; Knapp (yellow card) 90+11'	Stadium: CHI Memorial Stadium; Attendance: 1,701; Referee: Edson Carvajal
Note: Rescheduled from March 30

June 20, 2024 8	Forward Madison	2–0	Union Omaha	Madison, Wisconsin
7:00 CDT	Chaney 40' (pen.); Murphy Jr. (yellow card) 84'; Prentice 90+5', (yellow card) 90+6'	Report	Mastrantonio (yellow card) 23'; PC (yellow card) 39'; Gallardo (yellow card) 42'; Malone (yellow card) 83'	Stadium: Breese Stevens Field; Attendance: 4,076; Referee: Atahan Yaya

July 06, 2024 9	Lexington SC	2–4	Union Omaha	Georgetown, Kentucky
7:00 EDT	Méndez (yellow card) 7'; Uche (yellow card) 38'; Liadi (yellow card) 59'; Brown 63'; Malone 90+4' (o.g.)	Report	Dolabella 9' (pen.); Dos Santos 20', 34'; Malone (yellow card) 27'; Caputo 34' (o.g.)	Stadium: Toyota Stadium; Attendance: 1,135; Referee: Erick Lezama

July 13, 2023 10	Greenville Triumph	0–1	Union Omaha	Greenville, South Carolina
7:00 EDT	Lee (yellow card) 13'; Zakowski (yellow card) 27'; Anguiano (yellow card) 47'; Smith (yellow card) 69'	Report	Dos Santos (yellow card) 24'; Gómez (yellow card) 31'; Milanese (yellow card) 38'; Dolabella (yellow card) 45+1', (goal) 49'; PC (yellow card) 73'	Stadium: Paladin Stadium; Attendance: 1,656; Referee: Andrew Musashe

July 27, 2024 11	Union Omaha	0–1	Chattanooga Red Wolves	Papillion, Nebraska
7:00 CDT	Knapp (yellow card) 28'; Schneider (yellow card) 53'; Nortey (yellow card) 61'	Report	Fernandes (red card) 40'; Knapp (yellow card) 73'; Jérôme 74' (o.g.); Bush (yellow card) 81'	Stadium: Werner Park; Attendance: 3,652; Referee: Alejo Calume

August 3, 2024 12	Union Omaha	2–2	Forward Madison	Papillion, Nebraska
7:00 CDT	Mastrantonio (yellow card) 12'; Dos Santos (yellow card) 53', (goal) 63'; Dolabella (yellow card) 60', (goal) 71'; Gómez (yellow card) 63'; Gallardo (yellow card) 89'	Report	Villalobos (yellow card) 37'; Galindrez 47'; Chilaka (yellow card) 64'; Crull 90+5'; Murphy Jr. (yellow card) 90+9'; Chaney (yellow card) 90+9'	Stadium: Werner Park; Attendance: 3,265; Referee: Aleksandar Zhelyazkov

August 24, 2023 13	Union Omaha	3–0	Richmond Kickers	Papillion, Nebraska
7:00 CDT	Knapp 4'; Gallardo 19' (pen.), 84', (yellow card) 62'; Dos Santos (yellow card) 23'; Milanese (yellow card) 65'	Report	Morán (yellow card) 11'; Sukow (yellow card) 17'; Sierakowski (yellow card) 67'	Stadium: Werner Park; Attendance: 3,752; Referee: Wesley Costa

September 4, 2024 14	Spokane Velocity	2–1	Union Omaha	Spokane, Washington
6:00 PM PDT	Miller (yellow card) 39', (goal) 74'; Gil 47'	Report	Lewis (yellow card) 49'; Mastrontonio (yellow card) 73'; Dolabella 90+5'	Stadium: One Spokane Stadium; Attendance: 3,456; Referee: Rafael Bonilla

September 7, 2024 15	Union Omaha	3–1	Greenville Triumph	Papillion, Nebraska
7:00 CDT	Dolabella (yellow card) 26'; Polak 30', 54' (o.g.); Casciato (yellow card) 35'; Dos Santos 62'; Gómez (yellow card) 77'; Mastrantonio (yellow card) 90+5'	Report	Castro 21'; Corvino (yellow card) 34'; Smith (yellow card) 40'; Anderson (yellow card) 41'; Polak (yellow card) 44'; Shultz (yellow card) 82'	Stadium: Werner Park; Attendance: 3,440; Referee: Velimir Stefanovic

September 14, 2024 16	Hailstorm FC	2–3	Union Omaha	Windsor, Colorado
7:00 MDT	Rendón (yellow card) 15'; Powder 55' (pen.); Hoard 83'; Zayed (yellow card) 86'	Report	Acoff (yellow card) 29'; Gómez 40'; Kunga 56', 85', (yellow card) 86'; Nuhu (yellow card) 75'; Ostrem (yellow card) 80'; Rodríguez (yellow card) 90+5'	Stadium: Future Legends Complex; Attendance: 1,147; Referee: Erick Lezama

September 21, 2024 17	Union Omaha	1–0	One Knoxville	Papillion, Nebraska
7:00 CDT	Dolabella (yellow card) 24' (yellow-red card) 45+4'; Ostrem 31'; Knapp (yellow card) 55'; Gallardo (yellow card) 80'; Holt (yellow card) 90+5'	Report	Haugli (yellow card) 35'; Zarokosta (yellow card) 46'; Ritchie (yellow card) 57'	Stadium: Werner Park; Attendance: 2,896; Referee: Igor Bych

October 2, 2024 18	Union Omaha	4–0	Spokane Velocity	Papillion, Nebraska
12:00 CDT	Mastrantonio (yellow card) 17'; Lewis (yellow card) 36'; Gómez 43', 48', (yellow card) 83'; Ostrem 55'; Jérôme 59'; Kunga (yellow card) 75'	Report		Stadium: Werner Park; Attendance: 4,509; Referee: DeShun Beard

October 5, 2024 19	Richmond Kickers	0–0	Union Omaha	Richmond, Virginia
6:00 EDT	Fitch (yellow card) 14'; Cela (yellow card) 26'; O'Dwyer (yellow card) 47'; Garnett (yellow card) 90+2'	Report	Malone (yellow card) 11'; Jérôme (yellow card) 82'; Gómez (yellow card) 87' (yellow-red card) 87'	Stadium: City Stadium; Attendance: 5,448; Referee: Atahan Yaya

October 12, 2024 20	Union Omaha	2–1	Lexington SC	Papillion, Nebraska
4:00 CDT	Mastrantonio (yellow card) 53', (goal) 90+5'; Schneider (yellow card) 61'; Dolabella 77' (pen.)	Report	Uche (yellow card) 28' (yellow-red card) 76'; Diouf 64'	Stadium: Werner Park; Attendance: 4,509; Referee: Andrew Musashe

October 19, 2023 21	South Georgia Tormenta	2–3	Union Omaha	Statesboro, Georgia
7:30 EDT	Walker 2'; Dengler (yellow card) 12' (yellow-red card) 90+3'; Khoury (yellow card) 16'; Steedman (yellow card) 21' (yellow-red card) 40'; Mastrantonio 36' (o.g.); Vivas (yellow card) 81' (yellow-red card) 87'	Report	Rodríguez (yellow card) 9'; Schneider (yellow card) 32'; Gallardo (yellow card) 54'; Thorn 63' (o.g.); Lewis 67'; Ostrem (yellow card) 80'; Dolabella 90'; Holt (yellow card) 90+5'	Stadium: Optim Sports Medicine Field; Attendance: 1,069; Referee: Edson Carvajal

October 26, 2024 22	Union Omaha	3–1	Fuego FC	Papillion, Nebraska
4:00 CDT	Gómez 15'; Bronnik (yellow card) 47', (goal) 59'; Jiba 53', (yellow card) 70'; Knapp (yellow card) 55'	Report	Vinberg (yellow card) 20'; Midence (yellow card) 82'; Mariona 89'	Stadium: Werner Park; Attendance: 3,061; Referee: Esad Omanovic

=== USL League One playoffs ===
November 3, 2024 Quarter-Final	Union Omaha	1–0	Richmond Kickers	Papillion, Nebraska
2:30 PM CST	Mastrantonio (yellow card) 24'; Kunga 51'; Gómez (yellow card) 60'; Schneider (yellow card) 69'; Rodríguez (yellow card) 90+5'	Report	Cela (yellow card) 26'; O'Dwyer (yellow card) 67'	Stadium: Werner Park; Attendance: 2,245; Referee: Jeremy Scheer

November 9, 2024 Semi-Final	Union Omaha	2–1	Greenville Triumph	Papillion, Nebraska
4:00 PM CST	Gómez 42'; Lewis 58'; Gallardo (yellow card) 63'; Schneider (yellow card) 90+2'	Report	Lee 8'; Herrera (yellow card) 31'	Stadium: Werner Park; Attendance: 3,053; Referee: Matthew Corrigan

November 17, 2024 Final	Union Omaha	3–0	Spokane Velocity	Papillion, Nebraska
2:00 PM CST	Schneider 3'; Dolabella 19'; Kunga 71'	Report	Akale (yellow card) 7'; Miller (yellow card) 45'; Peláez (yellow card) 88'	Stadium: Werner Park; Attendance: 5,849; Referee: Adam Kilpatrick

=== Table ===
Pos	Team	Pld	W	PKW	PKL	L	GF	GA	GD	Pts	Qualification
1	Northern Colorado Hailstorm FC	8	6	1	1	0	22	10	+12	21	Advanced to knockout stage
2	Union Omaha	8	3	2	1	2	16	13	+3	14	Advanced to knockout stage (wild card)
3	Central Valley Fuego FC	8	1	1	3	3	8	10	−2	8	
4	Spokane Velocity FC	8	1	0	2	5	9	17	−8	5	

Source: USL League One

==== Match results ====
May 1, 2024 1	Union Omaha	2–2 (3-2 p)	Northern Colorado Hailstorm	Papillion, Nebraska
6:30 CDT	Rodríguez 44', 45+1'	Report	Rendón 17'; Hoard 62'; Opara (yellow card) 79'	Stadium: Werner Park; Attendance: 2,135; Referee: Lukasz Jozefecki
	Penalties
	Lewis (penalty scored); Milanese (penalty scored); Aoumaich (penalty missed); Bronnik (penalty scored); Rodríguez (penalty missed)		Fenwick (penalty missed); Martinez (penalty missed); Powder (penalty scored); Parra (penalty scored); Keegan (penalty missed)

May 11, 2024 2	Spokane Velocity	3–2	Union Omaha	Spokane, Washington
6:00 PDT	Lewis 16'; L. Gil 56'; J. Gil 90+3' (yellow card) 90+3'	Report	Rodríguez 11'; Mastrantonio (yellow card) 45'; Dolabella 51' (pen.); Milanese (yellow card) 65'; Gómez (yellow card) 90+1'	Stadium: One Spokane Stadium; Attendance: 4,523; Referee: Rafael Bonilla

May 29, 2024 3	Union Omaha	0–0 (4–1 p)	Fuego FC	Papillion, Nebraska
6:30 CDT	Knapp (yellow card) 32'; Perkins (yellow card) 45+1'; Holt (yellow card) 60'	Report	Midence (yellow card) 21'; Yaya (yellow card) 29'; Mendiola (yellow card) 68'; Torr (yellow card) 84'	Stadium: Werner Park; Attendance: 3,020; Referee: Amin Hadzic
	Penalties
	Mastrantonio (penalty scored); Aoumaich (penalty scored); PC (penalty scored); Rodríguez (penalty scored)		Coronado (penalty scored); Vasquez (penalty missed); Carrera-García (penalty missed)

June 13, 2024 4	Union Omaha	4–1	Spokane Velocity	Papillion, Nebraska
7:00 CDT	Rodríguez 17'; Malone (yellow card) 32'; Dolabella 63', (yellow card) 81'; Gallardo (yellow card) 77'; Kunga 82', (yellow card) 83'; Dos Santos 90+5' (pen.); Bronnik (yellow card) 90+7'	Report	L. Gil 33' (pen.); Lage (yellow card) 60'; Miller (yellow card) 90+4'	Stadium: Werner Park; Attendance: 3,188; Referee: José Lara

June 27, 2024 5	Union Omaha	4–2	Chattanooga Red Wolves	Papillion, Nebraska
7:00 CDT	Dos Santos 4', 20'; Kunga 54'; Dolabella 67', (yellow card) 68'	Report	Cvetanović (yellow card) 11'; Ruiz 40'; Lukic 45+5'; Fernandes (yellow card) 76'; Coutinho (yellow card) 88'	Stadium: Werner Park; Attendance: 3,061; Referee: Igor Bych

July 19, 2023 6	Northern Colorado Hailstorm	2–0	Union Omaha	Windsor, Colorado
7:00 MDT	King 9'; Gill (yellow card) 64'; Evans 69', (yellow card) 83'; Dietrich (yellow card) 77'; Martinez (yellow card) 83'	Report	Dolabella (yellow card) 20'; Dos Santos (yellow card) 26'; Gallardo (yellow card) 45+2'; Nortey (yellow card) 51'	Stadium: Future Legends Complex; Attendance: 1,613; Referee: Edson Carvajal

August 9, 2024 7	Fuego FC	0–1	Union Omaha	Fresno, California
8:00 PDT	Carrera-García (yellow card) 90+5'; Cromwell (yellow card) 90+9'	Report	Kunga (yellow card) 78'; Schneider (yellow card) 81'; Dos Santos 90+6'	Stadium: Fresno State Soccer Stadium; Referee: Olvin Oliva

August 29, 2024 8	Forward Madison	3–3 (5-4 p)	Union Omaha	Madison, Wisconsin
7:00 CDT	Prentice 2', (yellow card) 64'; Galindrez (yellow card) 16'; Milanese 23' (o.g.); Chaney (yellow card) 45+4', (goal) 85'; Dieye (yellow card) 81'	Report	Lewis 29'; Mastrantonio (yellow card) 45+2'; Kunga (yellow card) 65'; Dolabella 71'; Dos Santos 73'; Gallardo (yellow card) 80'; Gómez (yellow card) 87'	Stadium: Breese Stevens Field; Attendance: 3,676; Referee: Edson Carvajal
	Penalties
	Boyce (penalty scored); McLaughlin (penalty scored); Gebhard (penalty scored); Dieye (penalty scored); Chaney (penalty scored)		Dolabella (penalty scored); Gallardo (penalty scored); Milanese (penalty missed); Gómez (penalty scored); Rodríguez (penalty scored)

September 11, 2024 SF	Northern Colorado Hailstorm	2–0	Union Omaha	Windsor, Colorado
7:56 MDT	Hoard 56'; Rendón 72'; Parra (yellow card) 87'	Report	Jérôme (red card) 26'; Rodríguez (yellow card) 52'; Gómez (yellow card) 59'; Nortey (yellow card) 60'; Dolabella (yellow card) 63'; Schneider (red card) 75'; Gallardo (yellow card) 80'	Stadium: 4Rivers Equipment Stadium; Attendance: 1,657; Referee: Ekaterina Koroleva

=== U.S. Open Cup ===
March 21 First Round	(Massachusetts) Western Mass Pioneers (USL2)	0–4	(Nebraska) Union Omaha	Ludlow, Massachusetts
7:30 pm EDT	K. Rose (yellow card) 44'; S. Blasco (yellow card) 51'	Report	Gallardo 4', 73', 89'; Dos Santos 67'	Stadium: Lusitano Stadium; Referee: S. Briem

April 3 Second Round	(Nebraska) Union Omaha	3–1	(Iowa) Des Moines Menace (USL2)	Omaha, Nebraska
7:30 pm CDT	Nuhu (yellow card) 24'; Dolabella 34'; Milanese 48'; Gallardo (yellow card) 49'; PC (yellow card) 82'; Gómez (yellow card) 90+3'; Kunga 90+9'	Report	Mohammed (yellow card) 67'; Harmon (yellow card) 74'; Enzugusi 87'	Stadium: Al F. Caniglia Field; Attendance: 820; Referee: Kyle Healey

April 17 Third Round	(Nebraska) Union Omaha (USL2)	0–0 (5–3 p)	(Texas) El Paso Locomotive (USLC)	Papillion, Nebraska
7:00 pm CDT	Milanese (yellow card) 42'; Gómez (yellow card) 45+1'; Nortey (yellow card) 45+2'; Dolabella (yellow card) 70'; Aoumaich (yellow card) 105+2'	Report	Hinds (yellow card) 45+12'; Nevárez (yellow card) 55'; Rose (yellow card) 89'; Dollenmayer (red card) 90+2'; Alfaro (yellow card) 103'; Yuma (yellow card) 106'; Pelúa (yellow card) 107'; Pasquel (yellow card) 117'	Stadium: Werner Park; Attendance: 864; Referee: Esad Omanovic
	Penalties
	Gallardo (penalty scored); Mastrantonio (penalty scored); Aoumaich (penalty scored); Dolabella (penalty scored); Bronnik (penalty scored)		Calvillo (penalty scored); Alfaro (penalty scored); Pelúa (penalty missed); Dhillon (penalty scored)

May 8 Round of 32	(Nebraska) Union Omaha	1–2	Sporting Kansas City (MLS)	Omaha, Nebraska
7:00 pm CDT	Kunga 31'; Mastrantonio (yellow card) 57'; Knapp (yellow card) 81'; Gallardo (yellow card) 90+7'	Report	Tzionis 48'; Rodríguez (yellow card) 66'; Russell (yellow card) 78'; Radoja (yellow card) 91'; Voloder (yellow card) 108'; Pulido 120'	Stadium: Al F. Caniglia Field; Attendance: 4,733; Referee: Nabil Bensalah

== Statistics ==
=== Appearances and goals ===
Numbers after plus–sign (+) denote appearances as a substitute.

No.	Pos	Nat	Player	Total		USL-1		U.S. Open Cup	
No.	Pos	Nat	Player	Apps	Goals	Apps	Goals	Apps	Goals
2	DF	(Haiti) HAI	Mechack Jérôme	28	1	20+4	1	4+0	0
3	DF	(United States) USA	Blake Malone	32	2	24+5	2	3+0	0
4	DF	(Italy) ITA	Luca Mastrantonio	34	1	28+2	1	4+0	0
5	DF	(Italy) ITA	Marco Milanese	26	1	21+2	0	3+0	1
6	MF	(Brazil) BRA	PC	11	0	8+2	0	1+0	0
7	MF	(United States) USA	Joe Gallardo	31	7	23+4	4	4+0	3
8	MF	(England) ENG	Nortei Nortey	29	1	19+6	1	3+1	0
9	MF	(Brazil) BRA	Pedro Dolabella	30	15	25+1	14	4+0	1
10	FW	(Cape Verde) CPV	Steevan Dos Santos	23	11	16+5	10	2+0	1
11	FW	(Bermuda) BER	Zeiko Lewis	23	2	12+10	2	0+1	0
13	DF	(United States) USA	Anderson Holt	11	0	4+7	0	0+0	0
15	MF	(United States) USA	Brandon Knapp	33	1	15+14	1	0+4	0
18	FW	(United States) USA	Mark Bronnik	10	1	0+8	1	0+2	0
20	DF	(United States) USA	Charlie Ostrem	12	2	11+1	2	0+0	0
21	FW	(Mexico) MEX	Aarón Gómez	33	5	21+8	5	4+0	0
22	DF	(United States) USA	Will Perkins	6	0	3+1	0	1+1	0
23	MF	(Germany) GER	Max Schneider	12	0	6+6	0	0+0	0
24	GK	(Ghana) GHA	Rashid Nuhu	28	0	24+0	0	4+0	0
26	MF	(United States) USA	Dion Acoff	25	0	22+0	0	3+0	0
27	DF	(South Sudan) SSD	Ryen Jiba	20	1	4+13	1	1+2	0
33	FW	(France) FRA	Adam Aoumaich	9	1	1+5	1	0+3	0
36	GK	(United States) USA	Wallis Lapsley	7	0	7+0	0	0+0	0
70	MF	(United States) USA	Lagos Kunga	32	8	15+14	6	2+1	2
77	DF	(Ghana) GHA	Isaac Bawa	7	0	1+6	0	0+0	0
99	FW	(United States) USA	Missael Rodríguez	30	7	11+16	7	1+2	0

- Last updated: October 28, 2024
- Source: USL League One

=== Disciplinary record ===
No.	Pos.	Player	USL1			US Open Cup			Total		
No.	Pos.	Player	Yellow card	(yellow card) (yellow-red card)	Red card	Yellow card	(yellow card) (yellow-red card)	Red card	Yellow card	(yellow card) (yellow-red card)	Red card
2	DF	(Haiti) Mechack Jérôme	3	0	1	0	0	0	3	0	1
3	DF	(United States) Blake Malone	4	0	0	0	0	0	4	0	0
4	DF	(Italy) Luca Mastrantonio	10	0	0	1	0	0	11	0	0
5	DF	(Italy) Marco Milanese	5	0	0	1	0	0	6	0	0
6	MF	(Brazil) PC	4	0	0	1	0	0	5	0	0
7	MF	(United States) Joe Gallardo	13	0	0	2	0	0	15	0	0
8	MF	(England) Nortei Nortey	5	0	0	1	0	0	6	0	0
9	FW	(Brazil) Pedro Dolabella	7	1	0	1	0	0	8	1	0
10	FW	(Cape Verde) Steevan Dos Santos	4	0	0	0	0	0	4	0	0
11	FW	(Bermuda) Zeiko Lewis	2	0	0	0	0	0	2	0	0
13	DF	(United States) Anderson Holt	3	0	0	0	0	0	3	0	0
15	MF	(United States) Brandon Knapp	5	0	0	1	0	0	6	0	0
18	FW	(United States) Mark Bronnik	2	0	0	0	0	0	2	0	0
20	DF	(United States) Charlie Ostrem	2	0	0	0	0	0	2	0	0
21	FW	(Mexico) Aarón Gómez	10	1	0	2	0	0	12	1	0
22	DF	(United States) Will Perkins	1	0	0	0	0	0	1	0	0
23	MF	(Germany) Max Schneider	4	0	1	0	0	0	4	0	1
24	GK	(Ghana) Rashid Nuhu	2	0	0	1	0	0	3	0	0
26	MF	(United States) Dion Acoff	3	0	0	0	0	0	3	0	0
27	DF	(South Sudan) Ryen Jiba	1	0	0	0	0	0	1	0	0
33	FW	(France) Adam Aoumaich	0	0	0	1	0	0	1	0	0
36	GK	(United States) Wallis Lapsley	0	0	0	0	0	0	0	0	0
70	MF	(United States) Lagos Kunga	8	0	0	0	0	0	8	0	0
77	DF	(Ghana) Isaac Bawa	0	0	0	0	0	0	0	0	0
99	FW	(United States) Missael Rodríguez	4	1	0	0	0	0	4	1	0
Total			95	3	2	12	0	0	107	3	2

- Last updated: October 28, 2024
- Source: USL League One

== Awards and honors ==
Player of the Week
Week	Player	Opponent	Position	Ref
Jägermeister Cup Round 1	(United States) Missael Rodríguez	Northern Colorado Hailstorm	FW	
8	(United States) Joe Gallardo	Tormenta FC	MF	
13	(Cape Verde) Steevan Dos Santos	Lexington SC	FW	
Jägermeister Cup Round 7	(Cape Verde) Steevan Dos Santos (2)	Central Valley Fuego	FW	
18	(United States) Joe Gallardo (2)	Richmond Kickers	MF	

Team of the Week
Week	Player	Opponent	Position	Ref
2	(United States) Blake Malone	Central Valley Fuego FC	DF	
2	(Italy) Marco Milanese	Central Valley Fuego FC	Bench	
2	(Mexico) Aarón Gómez	Central Valley Fuego FC	Bench	
2	(Cape Verde) Steevan Dos Santos	Central Valley Fuego FC	Bench	
6	(United States) Blake Malone (2)	One Knoxville SC	DF	
6	(Cape Verde) Steevan Dos Santos (2)	One Knoxville SC	FW	
6	(Ghana) Rashid Nuhu	One Knoxville SC	Bench	
7	(Italy) Marco Milanese (2)	Charlotte Independence	DF	
7	(Ghana) Rashid Nuhu (2)	Charlotte Independence	Bench	
7	(Haiti) Mechack Jérôme	Charlotte Independence	Bench	
Jägermeister Cup Round 1	(South Sudan) Ryen Jiba	Northern Colorado Hailstorm	MF	
Jägermeister Cup Round 1	(United States) Missael Rodríguez	Northern Colorado Hailstorm	FW	
Jägermeister Cup Round 1	(United States) Wallis Lapsley	Northern Colorado Hailstorm	Bench	
Jägermeister Cup Round 1	(Italy) Luca Mastrantonio	Northern Colorado Hailstorm	Bench	
8	(England) Dominic Casciato	Tormenta FC	Coach	
8	(United States) Dion Acoff	Tormenta FC	DF	
8	(Brazil) Pedro Dolabella	Tormenta FC	MF	
8	(United States) Joe Gallardo	Tormenta FC	MF	
8	(Ghana) Rashid Nuhu (3)	Tormenta FC	Bench	
8	(England) Nortei Nortey	Tormenta FC	Bench	
Jägermeister Cup Round 2	(United States) Missael Rodríguez (2)	Spokane Velocity	FW	
Jägermeister Cup Round 2	(Brazil) Pedro Dolabella (2)	Spokane Velocity	Bench	
8	(Brazil) Pedro Dolabella (3)	Tormenta FC	MF	
8	(United States) Lagos Kunga	Tormenta FC	MF	
8	(United States) Missael Rodríguez (3)	Tormenta FC	FW	
8	(Italy) Marco Milanese (3)	Tormenta FC	Bench	
8	(Mexico) Aarón Gómez (2)	Tormenta FC	Bench	
Jägermeister Cup Round 3	(Brazil) Pedro Dolabella (4)	Central Valley Fuego	MF	
Jägermeister Cup Round 3	(United States) Lagos Kunga	Central Valley Fuego	MF	
Jägermeister Cup Round 3	(United States) Missael Rodríguez (3)	Central Valley Fuego	FW	
10	(United States) Blake Malone (3)	Chattanooga Red Wolves	DF	
10	(Brazil) Pedro Dolabella (5)	Chattanooga Red Wolves	MF	
10	(United States) Joe Gallardo (2)	Chattanooga Red Wolves	FW	
Jägermeister Cup Round 4	(Brazil) PC	Spokane Velocity	MF	
Jägermeister Cup Round 4	(Cape Verde) Steevan Dos Santos (2)	Spokane Velocity	FW	
Jägermeister Cup Round 4	(United States) Missael Rodríguez (4)	Spokane Velocity	Bench	
12	(Italy) Luca Mastrantonio (2)	Forward Madison	Bench	
Jägermeister Cup Round 5	(United States) Blake Malone (4)	Chattanooga Red Wolves	DF	
Jägermeister Cup Round 5	(Cape Verde) Steevan Dos Santos (3)	Chattanooga Red Wolves	FW	
Jägermeister Cup Round 5	(Brazil) Pedro Dolabella (6)	Chattanooga Red Wolves	Bench	
Jägermeister Cup Round 5	(United States) Joe Gallardo (3)	Chattanooga Red Wolves	Bench	
Jägermeister Cup Round 5	(United States) Missael Rodríguez (5)	Chattanooga Red Wolves	Bench	
13	(Brazil) Pedro Dolabella (7)	Lexington SC	MF	
13	(Cape Verde) Steevan Dos Santos (4)	Lexington SC	FW	
14	(United States) Luca Mastrantonio (3)	Greenville Triumph	DF	
14	(Brazil) Pedro Dolabella (8)	Greenville Triumph	MF	
Jägermeister Cup Round 7	(United States) Wallis Lapsley (2)	Central Valley Fuego	GK	
Jägermeister Cup Round 7	(Cape Verde) Steevan Dos Santos (5)	Central Valley Fuego	FW	
18	(United States) Joe Gallardo (4)	Richmond Kickers	MF	
18	(United States) Brandon Knapp	Richmond Kickers	MF	
Jägermeister Cup Round 7	(Cape Verde) Steevan Dos Santos (6)	Northern Colorado Hailstorm	FW	
19	(Brazil) Pedro Dolabella (9)	Spokane Velocity	MF	
19	(Cape Verde) Steevan Dos Santos (7)	Spokane Velocity	FW	
20	(United States) Lagos Kunga (3)	Northern Colorado Hailstorm FC	FW	
20	(England) Dominic Casciato	Northern Colorado Hailstorm FC	Coach	
20	(Mexico) Aarón Gómez (3)	Northern Colorado Hailstorm FC	Bench	
21	(England) Dominic Casciato (2)	One Knoxville SC	Coach	
21	(United States) Charlie Ostrem	One Knoxville SC	Bench	
22	(United States) Charlie Ostrem (2)	Spokane Velocity	MF	
22	(Mexico) Aarón Gómez (4)	Spokane Velocity	Bench	
22	(Ghana) Rashid Nuhu (4)	Spokane Velocity	Bench	
23	(Italy) Luca Mastrantonio (3)	Lexington SC	Bench	
24	(Germany) Max Schneider	South Georgia Tormenta	MF	
24	(Brazil) Pedro Dolabella (10)	South Georgia Tormenta	Bench	
24	(United States) Joe Gallardo (5)	South Georgia Tormenta	Bench	
25	(South Sudan) Ryen Jiba (2)	Central Valley Fuego	DF	
25	(Mexico) Aarón Gómez (5)	Central Valley Fuego	Bench	

Save of the Week
Week	Player	Opponent	Ref
9	(Ghana) Rashid Nuhu	Charlotte Independence	
