= 2024 U.S. Open Cup =

109th edition of cup competition in American soccer

2024 Lamar Hunt U.S. Open Cup
Tournament details
- Country: United States
- Dates: March 19 – September 25
- Teams: 95

Final positions
- Champions: Los Angeles FC (1st title)
- Runners-up: Sporting Kansas City

Tournament statistics
- Matches played: 92
- Goals scored: 292 (3.17 per match)
- Top goal scorers: Dembor Benson; Jonathan Jiménez; Stefano Pinho; (4 goals each)

The 2024 Lamar Hunt U.S. Open Cup was the 109th edition of the U.S. Open Cup, the knockout domestic cup competition of American soccer. Houston Dynamo FC were the defending champions, but were eliminated in the round of 32 by Detroit City FC.

Los Angeles FC won their first U.S. Open Cup title after defeating Sporting Kansas City 3–1 after extra time in the final, held at BMO Stadium in Los Angeles on September 25.

On December 15, 2023, Major League Soccer announced that its teams would not participate in the 2024 edition of the U.S. Open Cup due to fixture congestion. This would have been the first year since its inception that MLS teams would not participate in the tournament. The league intended to send reserve teams from MLS Next Pro instead, but the request was denied by the United States Soccer Federation on December 20. An agreement was tempered between the two sides in mid-February, whereby MLS will send some, but not all, of its teams to the Open Cup for 2024, with discussions ongoing for a long-term solution in 2025 and beyond. On March 1, 2024, the official format was announced, with eight MLS first teams and nine MLS Next Pro reserve teams taking part. This was the first edition of the U.S. Open Cup since 2011 where some MLS teams did not take part in the competition, and the first since 2015 where MLS reserve sides participated. With the exception of Houston Dynamo FC, the eight MLS teams that qualified for the 2024 CONCACAF Champions Cup did not participate, and the next seven highest-rated US-based clubs from the 2023 MLS rankings fielded their first teams, while the rest of the MLS clubs fielded their MLS Next Pro team (except for D.C. United, which did not have an MLS Next Pro team).

== Schedule ==
Schedule for 2024 Lamar Hunt U.S. Open Cup
Round	Draw date	Match day	Entrants	Teams entered to date
First Round	March 1, 2024	March 19–21, 2024	11 local qualifiers 1 National Amateur Cup; 1 UPSL Spring Champion; 8 National Premier Soccer League teams 11 USL League Two teams 12 USL League One teams 8 NISA teams 11 MLS Next Pro teams	63 teams
Second Round	March 22, 2024	April 2–3, 2024	32 winners from First Round	63 teams
Third Round	April 4, 2024	April 16–17, 2024	16 winners from Second Round; 16 USL Championship teams	79 teams
Round of 32	April 18, 2024	May 7–8, 2024	16 winners from Third Round; 8 USL Championship teams 8 Major League Soccer teams	95 teams
Round of 16	April 18, 2024	May 21–22, 2024	16 winners from Round of 32	95 teams
Quarterfinals	May 22, 2024	July 9–10, 2024	8 winners from Round of 16	95 teams
Semifinals	May 22, 2024	August 27–28, 2024	4 winners from Quarterfinals	95 teams
Final		September 25, 2024	2 winners from Semifinals	95 teams

== Teams ==
On March 18, 2024, Georgia Lions FC was announced as having forfeit their first round match at Apotheos FC.

=== Table ===
**Enter in First Round**			**Enter in Third Round**	**Enter in Round of 32**	
**Open Division**		**Division III**	**Division II**		**Division I**
**USASA/USSSA**; 13 teams	**NPSL/USL2**; 19 teams	**MLS Next Pro/NISA/USL1**; ~~32 teams~~ 31 teams	**USL Championship**; 24 teams		**MLS**; 8 teams
National Amateur Cup: SC MesoAmerica (Cal South State Cup); UPSL Spring Champions: AS Frenzi; Local Qualifiers: Azteca FC (CPL); Brockton FC United (UPSL); Chicago House AC (MWPL); Christos FC (MSSL); FC America CFL Spurs (UPSL); FC Folsom (UPSL); Foro SC (UPSL); Irvine Zeta FC 2 (UPSL); Miami United FC (USSL); South Carolina United Heat (UPSL); Vereinigung Erzgebirge (USL-P)	NPSL: Apotheos FC; Duluth FC; El Farolito SC $ (Note: Open Division team with most goals scored in tournament proper.); FC Motown; Lubbock Matadors SC; Steel City FC; Tulsa Athletic; West Chester United SC; USL2: Asheville City SC; Ballard FC; Brave SC; Chicago City SC; Des Moines Menace; Hudson Valley Hammers; Northern Virginia FC (Note: Northern Virginia FC replaced Salem City FC, who withdrew from the competition.); Redlands FC; South Carolina United FC; Vermont Green FC; Western Mass Pioneers	MLS Next Pro: Austin FC II; Carolina Core FC; Chattanooga FC; Chicago Fire FC II; Colorado Rapids 2; Crown Legacy FC; Minnesota United FC 2; New York City FC II $; New York Red Bulls II; Portland Timbers 2; Ventura County FC; NISA: Arizona Monsoon FC; ~~Georgia Lions FC~~; Capo FC; Club de Lyon; Irvine Zeta FC; Los Angeles Force; Maryland Bobcats FC; Michigan Stars FC; Savannah Clovers FC; USL1: Central Valley Fuego FC; Charlotte Independence; Chattanooga Red Wolves SC; Forward Madison FC; Greenville Triumph SC; Lexington SC; Northern Colorado Hailstorm FC; One Knoxville SC; Richmond Kickers; South Georgia Tormenta FC; Spokane Velocity; Union Omaha	Birmingham Legion FC; Detroit City FC; El Paso Locomotive FC; Hartford Athletic; Indy Eleven $; Las Vegas Lights FC; Loudoun United FC; Louisville City FC; Memphis 901 FC; Miami FC; Monterey Bay FC; New Mexico United; North Carolina FC; Oakland Roots SC; Rhode Island FC; FC Tulsa	Charleston Battery; Colorado Springs Switchbacks FC; Orange County SC; Phoenix Rising FC; Pittsburgh Riverhounds SC; Sacramento Republic FC; San Antonio FC; Tampa Bay Rowdies	Atlanta United FC; FC Dallas; Houston Dynamo FC; Los Angeles FC $$$; Real Salt Lake; San Jose Earthquakes; Seattle Sounders FC; Sporting Kansas City $$

- **Bold** denotes team is still active in the tournament.
- $: Winner of $25,000 bonus for advancing the furthest in the competition from their respective divisions.
- $$: Winner of $100,000 for being the runner-up in the competition.
- $$$: Winner of $300,000 for winning the competition.

=== Map ===
Locations of teams in the tournament proper.
- MLS
- USLC
- Division 3 (MLSNP/USL1/NISA)
- Open Division (USL2/NPSL)
- Local Qualifiers, National Amateur Cup Champion and UPSL Spring Champion
- Multiple Teams

Metro areas with multiple teams:

- Atlanta: Atlanta United FC (MLS), Apotheos FC (NPSL)
- Charlotte: Crown Legacy FC (MLSNP), Charlotte Independence (USL1)
- Chattanooga: Chattanooga FC (MLSNP), Chattanooga Red Wolves SC (USL1)
- Chicago: Chicago Fire FC II (MLSNP), Chicago City SC (USL2), Chicago House AC (local)
- Columbia: SC United Bantams (USL2), South Carolina United Heat (local)
- Dallas: FC Dallas (MLS), Foro SC (local)
- Denver: Colorado Rapids 2 (MLSNP), Azteca FC (local)
- Detroit: Detroit City FC (USLC), Michigan Stars FC (NISA)
- Los Angeles: Los Angeles FC (MLS), Ventura County FC (MLSNP), Orange County SC (USLC), Capo FC (NISA), Los Angeles Force (NISA), Irvine Zeta FC (NISA), Irvine Zeta FC 2 (local)
- Miami: Miami FC (USLC), Miami United FC (local)
- New York City: New York City FC II (MLSNP), New York Red Bulls II (MLSNP), FC Motown (NPSL)
- Orlando: AS Frenzi (UPSL Spring Champions), FC America CFL Spurs (local)
- Philadelphia: West Chester United SC (NPSL), Vereinigung Erzgebirge (local)
- Phoenix: Phoenix Rising FC (USLC), Arizona Monsoon FC (NISA)
- Pittsburgh: Pittsburgh Riverhounds SC (USLC), Steel City FC (NPSL)
- Sacramento: Sacramento Republic FC (USLC), FC Folsom (local)
- San Francisco Bay Area: San Jose Earthquakes (MLS), Oakland Roots SC (USLC), El Farolito SC (NPSL)
- Seattle: Seattle Sounders FC (MLS), Ballard FC (USL2)
- Tulsa: FC Tulsa (USLC), Tulsa Athletic (NPSL)

=== Number of teams by state ===
A total of 34 states were represented by clubs in the U.S. Open Cup this year.

	States	Number	Teams
1	California	16	Capo FC, Central Valley Fuego FC, El Farolito SC, FC Folsom, Irvine Zeta FC, Irvine Zeta FC 2, Ventura County FC, Los Angeles FC, Los Angeles Force, Monterey Bay FC, Oakland Roots SC, Orange County SC, Redlands FC, Sacramento Republic FC, San Jose Earthquakes, SC MesoAmerica
2	Florida	7	AS Frenzi, Brave SC, Club de Lyon, FC America CFL Spurs, Miami FC, Miami United FC, Tampa Bay Rowdies
2	Texas	7	Austin FC II, FC Dallas, El Paso Locomotive FC, Foro SC, Houston Dynamo FC, Lubbock Matadors SC, San Antonio FC
4	North Carolina	5	Asheville City SC, Carolina Core FC, Charlotte Independence, Crown Legacy FC, North Carolina FC
5	Colorado	4	Azteca FC, Colorado Rapids 2, Colorado Springs Switchbacks FC, Northern Colorado Hailstorm FC
5	Georgia	4	Apotheos FC, Atlanta United FC, South Georgia Tormenta FC, Savannah Clovers FC
5	Pennsylvania	4	Pittsburgh Riverhounds SC, Steel City FC, Vereinigung Erzgebirge, West Chester United SC
5	South Carolina	4	Charleston Battery, Greenville Triumph SC, SC United Bantams, South Carolina United Heat
5	Tennessee	4	Chattanooga FC, Chattanooga Red Wolves SC, Memphis 901 FC, One Knoxville SC
10	Illinois	3	Chicago City SC, Chicago Fire FC II, Chicago House AC
10	Virginia	3	Loudoun United, NoVa FC, Richmond Kickers
10	Washington	3	Ballard FC, Seattle Sounders FC, Spokane Velocity FC
13	Arizona	2	Arizona Monsoon FC, Phoenix Rising FC
13	Kentucky	2	Louisville City FC, Lexington SC
13	Maryland	2	Christos FC, Maryland Bobcats FC
13	Massachusetts	2	Brockton FC United, Western Mass Pioneers
13	Michigan	2	Detroit City FC, Michigan Stars FC
13	Minnesota	2	Duluth FC, Minnesota United FC 2
13	New Jersey	2	FC Motown, New York Red Bulls II
13	New York	2	Hudson Valley Hammers, New York City FC II
13	Oklahoma	2	FC Tulsa, Tulsa Athletic
22	Alabama	1	Birmingham Legion FC
22	Connecticut	1	Hartford Athletic
22	Indiana	1	Indy Eleven
22	Iowa	1	Des Moines Menace
22	Kansas	1	Sporting Kansas City
22	Nebraska	1	Union Omaha
22	Nevada	1	Las Vegas Lights FC
22	New Mexico	1	New Mexico United
22	Oregon	1	Portland Timbers 2
22	Rhode Island	1	Rhode Island FC
22	Utah	1	Real Salt Lake
22	Vermont	1	Vermont Green FC
22	Wisconsin	1	Forward Madison FC

=== Open Cup debuts ===
27 teams made their Open Cup debuts in the 2024 tournament.

- USLC: Rhode Island FC
- NISA: Arizona Monsoon FC, Irvine Zeta FC
- USL1: Spokane Velocity FC
- MLSNP: Austin FC II, Carolina Core FC, Chicago Fire FC II, Colorado Rapids 2, Crown Legacy FC, Minnesota United FC 2, New York City FC II
- NPSL: Apotheos FC, Lubbock Matadors SC, Steel City FC
- USL2: Asheville City SC, Ballard FC, Chicago City SC, Hudson Valley Hammers, Redlands FC, Vermont Green FC
- NAC: SC MesoAmerica
- UPSL: AS Frenzi
- Local: FC America CFL Spurs, FC Folsom, Foro SC, Irvine Zeta FC 2, South Carolina United Heat

== Early rounds ==
=== Bracket ===
First round March 19–21
**USL1**	**(Georgia (U.S. state)) South Georgia Tormenta FC**	**1**
UPSL	(Florida) FC America CFL Spurs	0
USL2	(Florida) Brave SC	0
**NISA**	**(Georgia (U.S. state)) Savannah Clovers FC**	**2**
USL-P	(Pennsylvania) Vereinigung Erzgebirge	0
**USL1**	**(North Carolina) Charlotte Independence**	**2**
MLSNP	(North Carolina) Crown Legacy FC	0
**UPSL**	**South Carolina United Heat**	**1**
**NPSL**	(Georgia (U.S. state)) **Apotheos FC**	**w/o**
NISA	(Georgia (U.S. state)) ~~Georgia Lions FC~~
**USL1**	**(Tennessee) Chattanooga Red Wolves SC (a.e.t.)**	**4**
UPSL	(Massachusetts) Brockton FC United	2
MLSNP	(Tennessee) Chattanooga FC	0
**USSL**	**(Florida) Miami United FC**	**1**
UPSL	(Florida) AS Frenzi	2
**NISA**	**(Florida) Club de Lyon FC**	**3**
USL2	(Massachusetts) Western Mass Pioneers	0
**USL1**	**(Nebraska) Union Omaha**	**4**
NISA	(California) Capo FC	2 (4)
**USL2**	**(Iowa) Des Moines Menace (p)**	**2 (5)**
**MLSNP**	**Colorado Rapids 2**	**3**
CPL	(Colorado) Azteca FC	0
NPSL	(Oklahoma) Tulsa Athletic	1
**USL1**	**Northern Colorado Hailstorm FC**	**4**
USL2	(North Carolina) Asheville City SC	0
**USL1**	**(Tennessee) One Knoxville SC**	**2**
USL2	(South Carolina) SC United Bantams	0
**USL1**	**(South Carolina) Greenville Triumph SC**	**1**
**USL2**	**Vermont Green FC**	**4**
USL1	(Kentucky) Lexington SC	3
**MLSNP**	**(North Carolina) Carolina Core FC**	**3**
USL2	Northern Virginia FC	2
**MLSNP**	**(California) Ventura County FC**	**2**
UPSL	(California) Irvine Zeta FC 2	1
**NISA**	**(California) Irvine Zeta FC**	**1**
CSA	(California) SC MesoAmerica	0
UPSL	(California) FC Folsom	1
**USL1**	**(California) Central Valley Fuego FC**	**2**
MLSNP	(Oregon) Portland Timbers 2	1
**NPSL**	**(California) El Farolito SC**	**2**
USL2	(Washington (state)) Ballard FC	0
**USL1**	**(Washington (state)) Spokane Velocity FC**	**1**
**NISA**	**(California) Los Angeles Force**	**2**
USL2	(California) Redlands FC	1
**USL1**	**(Virginia) Richmond Kickers**	**1**
MSSL	(Maryland) Christos FC	0
NPSL	(Pennsylvania) West Chester United SC	0
**NISA**	**Maryland Bobcats FC**	**2**
**MLSNP**	**(Illinois) Chicago Fire FC II**	**6**
USL2	(Illinois) Chicago City SC	0
**USL1**	**(Wisconsin) Forward Madison FC**	**2**
NPSL	(Minnesota) Duluth FC	0
MWPL	(Illinois) Chicago House AC	0
**MLSNP**	**Minnesota United FC 2**	**3**
NPSL	(Pennsylvania) Steel City FC	0
**NISA**	**Michigan Stars FC**	**1**
NPSL	(New Jersey) FC Motown	0
**MLSNP**	**(New York (state)) New York City FC II**	**3**
**MLSNP**	**(New Jersey) New York Red Bulls II**	**5**
USL2	(New York (state)) Hudson Valley Hammers	1
**NPSL**	**(Texas) Lubbock Matadors SC (a.e.t.)**	**2**
NISA	Arizona Monsoon FC	1
MLSNP	(Texas) Austin FC II	2 (3)
**UPSL**	**(Texas) Foro SC (p)**	**2 (4)**

Second round April 2–3
**USL1**	**(Georgia (U.S. state)) South Georgia Tormenta FC**	**4**
NISA	(Georgia (U.S. state)) Savannah Clovers FC	0
**USL1**	**(North Carolina) Charlotte Independence (p)**	**0 (4)**
UPSL	South Carolina United Heat	0 (3)
NPSL	(Georgia (U.S. state)) Apotheos FC	0
**USL1**	**(Tennessee) Chattanooga Red Wolves SC**	**1**
**USSL**	**(Florida) Miami United FC**	**2**
NISA	(Florida) Club de Lyon FC	0
**USL1**	**(Nebraska) Union Omaha**	**3**
USL2	(Iowa) Des Moines Menace	1
MLSNP	Colorado Rapids 2	2
**USL1**	**Northern Colorado Hailstorm FC (a.e.t.)**	**3**
USL1	(Tennessee) One Knoxville SC	2
**USL1**	**(South Carolina) Greenville Triumph SC (a.e.t.)**	**3**
USL2	Vermont Green FC	1
**MLSNP**	**(North Carolina) Carolina Core FC**	**2**
MLSNP	(California) Ventura County FC	0
**NISA**	**(California) Irvine Zeta FC**	**3**
USL1	(California) Central Valley Fuego FC	1
**NPSL**	**(California) El Farolito SC**	**2**
**USL1**	**(Washington (state)) Spokane Velocity FC**	**1**
NISA	(California) Los Angeles Force	0
**USL1**	**(Virginia) Richmond Kickers**	**5**
NISA	Maryland Bobcats FC	2
**MLSNP**	**(Illinois) Chicago Fire FC II**	**2**
USL1	(Wisconsin) Forward Madison FC	0
MLSNP	Minnesota United FC 2	0
**NISA**	**Michigan Stars FC (a.e.t.)**	**2**
**MLSNP**	**(New York (state)) New York City FC II**	**4**
MLSNP	(New Jersey) New York Red Bulls II	2
**NPSL**	**(Texas) Lubbock Matadors SC**	**2**
UPSL	(Texas) Foro SC	0

Third round April 16–17
USLC	(Florida) Miami FC	2
**USL1**	**(Georgia (U.S. state)) South Georgia Tormenta FC**	**4**
**USL1**	**(North Carolina) Charlotte Independence (p)**	**4 (5)**
USLC	Rhode Island FC	4 (4)
**USLC**	**(Alabama) Birmingham Legion FC (a.e.t.)**	**4**
USL1	(Tennessee) Chattanooga Red Wolves SC	2
**USLC**	**(Tennessee) Memphis 901 FC**	**2**
USSL	(Florida) Miami United FC	0
**USL1**	**(Nebraska) Union Omaha (p)**	**0 (5)**
USLC	(Texas) El Paso Locomotive FC	0 (3)
**USLC**	**(Oklahoma) FC Tulsa**	**2**
USL1	Northern Colorado Hailstorm FC	1
**USLC**	**(Kentucky) Louisville City FC**	**3**
USL1	(South Carolina) Greenville Triumph SC	1
**USLC**	**North Carolina FC**	**1**
MLSNP	(North Carolina) Carolina Core FC	0
**USLC**	**(California) Monterey Bay FC**	**2**
NISA	(California) Irvine Zeta FC	1
**USLC**	**(California) Oakland Roots SC (a.e.t.)**	**2**
NPSL	(California) El Farolito SC	1
**USLC**	**(Nevada) Las Vegas Lights FC (a.e.t.)**	**2**
USL1	(Washington (state)) Spokane Velocity FC	1
USL1	(Virginia) Richmond Kickers	0 (4)
**USLC**	**(Virginia) Loudoun United FC (p)**	**0 (5)**
MLSNP	(Illinois) Chicago Fire FC II	0
**USLC**	**(Indiana) Indy Eleven**	**1**
**USLC**	**(Michigan) Detroit City FC**	**1**
NISA	Michigan Stars FC	0
USLC	(Connecticut) Hartford Athletic	2
**MLSNP**	**(New York (state)) New York City FC II (a.e.t.)**	**3**
**USLC**	**New Mexico United**	**3**
NPSL	(Texas) Lubbock Matadors SC	1

Host team listed first
Bold = winner

=== First round ===
The complete draw for the first round, including match dates and times, was announced on March 2, 2024.

All times local to game site.

March 19	Chattanooga FC (MLSNP) **(Tennessee)**	**0–1**	**(Florida) Miami United (USSL)**	Chattanooga, Tennessee
6:00 pm EDT		Report	Pajoy 12'	Stadium: Finley Stadium; Attendance: 2,312; Referee: Promise Adebayo-Ige

March 19	Brave SC (USL2) **(Florida)**	**0–2**	**(Georgia (U.S. state)) Savannah Clovers FC (NISA)**	The Villages, Florida
7:00 pm EDT		Report	Green 29'; Jokic 45+2'	Stadium: H.G. Morse Stadium; Attendance: 120; Referee: Daniel Gutierrez

March 19	**Vermont Green FC (USL2)**	**4–3**	**(Kentucky)** Lexington SC (USL1)	Burlington, Vermont
7:00 pm EDT	Barrett 5'; Lockermann 10'; Labovitz 24'; Ashford 50'	Report	Cano 20'; Lancaster 60', 78'	Stadium: Virtue Field; Attendance: 4,500; Referee: Brendan Fanning

March 19	**Forward Madison FC (USL1) (Wisconsin)**	**2–0**	**(Minnesota)** Duluth FC (NPSL)	Madison, Wisconsin
6:00 pm CDT	Chaney 9', 53'	Report		Stadium: Breese Stevens Field; Attendance: 1,240; Referee: Peter Bernardy

March 19	West Chester United SC (NPSL) (Pennsylvania)	**0–2**	**Maryland Bobcats FC (NISA)**	Wayne, Pennsylvania
7:30 pm EDT		Report	Espinal 8', 57'	Stadium: YSC Sports; Attendance: 250; Referee: Bennett Sheker

March 19	**South Georgia Tormenta FC (USL1) (Georgia (U.S. state))**	**1–0**	(Florida) FC America CFL Spurs (UPSL)	Statesboro, Georgia
7:30 pm EDT	Akoto 5'	Report		Stadium: Optim Sports Medicine Field at Tormenta Stadium; Attendance: 1,001; Referee: Izlen Peksenar

March 19	Tulsa Athletic (NPSL) **(Oklahoma)**	**1–4**	**Northern Colorado Hailstorm FC (USL1)**	Tulsa, Oklahoma
7:00 pm CDT	Lopez 88'	Report	Opara 43'; Parra 50'; Hernández 65'; Hoard 85'	Stadium: Athletic Community Field at Hicks Park; Attendance: 251; Referee: Matthew Corrigan

March 19	Austin FC II (MLSNP) **(Texas)**	**2–2** (a.e.t.) (**3–4** p)	**(Texas) Foro SC (UPSL)**	Austin, Texas
8:00 pm CDT	Katawa 53' (o.g.); Pineau 105'	Report	Sauceda 39'; Bennett 120+3'	Stadium: Parmer Field; Attendance: 1,300; Referee: William Hale
	**Penalties**
	Fodrey (penalty scored); Mazzaferro (penalty missed); Ramirez (penalty scored); Pineau (penalty scored); Torres (penalty missed)		(penalty scored) Padilla; (penalty missed) Ruiz; (penalty scored) Albury; (penalty scored) Celi; (penalty scored) Bennett

March 19	Portland Timbers 2 (MLSNP) **(Oregon)**	**1–2**	**(California) El Farolito SC (NPSL)**	Portland, Oregon
7:30 pm PDT	Ferdinand 30'	Report	Yabur 52'; Benson 68'	Stadium: Providence Park; Attendance: 652; Referee: Justin St. Pierre

March 20	**Richmond Kickers (USL1) (Virginia)**	**1–0**	**(Maryland)** Christos FC (MSSL)	Richmond, Virginia
6:30 pm EDT	Billhardt 45+1'	Report		Stadium: City Stadium; Attendance: 1,108; Referee: Brendan O'Neill

March 20	AS Frenzi (UPSL) **(Florida)**	**2–3**	**(Florida) Club de Lyon FC (NISA)**	Daytona Beach, Florida
7:00 pm EDT	Miranda 35'; Forestal 47'	Report	Miranda 9' (o.g.); Martínez 23', 90+1'	Stadium: Daytona State College Soccer Stadium; Attendance: 124; Referee: Jonathan Bilinski

March 20	SC United Bantams (USL2) **(South Carolina)**	**0–1**	**(South Carolina) Greenville Triumph SC (USL1)**	Columbia, South Carolina
7:00 pm EDT		Report	Castro 45'	Stadium: Southeastern Freight Lines Soccer Complex; Attendance: 600; Referee: Joe Tompkins

March 20	Asheville City SC (USL2) **(North Carolina)**	**0–2**	**(Tennessee) One Knoxville SC (USL1)**	Asheville, North Carolina
7:00 pm EDT		Report	Castro 13'; Johnson 45+4'	Stadium: Greenwood Soccer Field; Attendance: 1,115; Referee: Josiah Parke

March 20	**Apotheos FC (NPSL) (Georgia (U.S. state))**	**1–0** **forfeit**	**(Georgia (U.S. state))** ~~Georgia Lions FC~~ (NISA)	Atlanta, Georgia
7:30 pm EDT		Report		Stadium: Silverbacks Park Stadium; Attendance: NA
Note: Apotheos FC advanced on walkover due to Georgia Lions FC forfeiting.

March 20	**New York Red Bulls II (MLSNP) (New Jersey)**	**5–1**	(New York (state)) Hudson Valley Hammers (USL2)	Montclair, New Jersey
7:30 pm EDT	Sullivan 17'; Sofo 43'; Jarvis 63'; Dembele 83'; Kasule 90+1'	Report	Neto 79'	Stadium: MSU Soccer Park at Pittser Field; Attendance: 1,073; Referee: Christian Centeno

March 20	**Chicago Fire FC II (MLSNP) (Illinois)**	**6–0**	**(Illinois)** Chicago City SC (USL2)	Bridgeview, Illinois
7:00 pm CDT	Labovic 6' (o.g.); Granda 45+1'; Poreba 65'; Nesci 70'; Osorio 84'; Hlyut 86'	Report		Stadium: SeatGeek Stadium; Attendance: 902; Referee: Alex Beehler

March 20	Chicago House AC (MWPL) **(Illinois)**	**0–3**	**Minnesota United FC 2 (MLSNP)**	Elmhurst, Illinois
7:00 pm CDT		Report	Adebayo-Smith 52', 55', 90+5'	Stadium: Langhorst Field; Attendance: 435; Referee: Igor Bych

March 20	FC Folsom (UPSL) **(California)**	**1–2**	**(California) Central Valley Fuego FC (USL1)**	Folsom, California
7:00 pm PDT	Wilondja 51'	Report	Ramos 9'; John-Brown 82'	Stadium: Folsom Lake College Soccer Field; Attendance: 266; Referee: Turan Özdemir

March 20	**Irvine Zeta FC (NISA) (California)**	**1–0**	**(California)** SC MesoAmerica (CSA)	Irvine, California
7:30 pm PDT	Kadono 12'	Report		Stadium: Championship Soccer Stadium; Attendance: 100; Referee: Servando Berna Rico

March 20	**Los Angeles Force (NISA) (California)**	**2–1**	**(California)** Redlands FC (USL2)	Long Beach, California
7:30 pm PDT	Quist 40'; de Oca 84'	Report	Kovach 42'	Stadium: Long Beach City College; Attendance: 150; Referee: Trevor Wiseman

March 20	Ballard FC (USL2) **(Washington (state))**	**0–1**	**(Washington (state)) Spokane Velocity FC (USL1)**	Seattle, Washington
7:30 pm PDT		Report	Lewis 90+7'	Stadium: Memorial Stadium; Attendance: 2,452; Referee: Jaclyn Metz

March 20	Capo FC (NISA) **(California)**	**2–2** (a.e.t.) (**4–5** p)	**(Iowa) Des Moines Menace (USL2)**	San Juan Capistrano, California
8:00 pm PDT	Scalzo 66', 120'	Report	Harmon 53'; Enzugusi 117'	Stadium: JSerra Catholic High School; Attendance: 100; Referee: Osvaldo Delgado-Landeros
	**Penalties**
	Vickers (penalty scored); Simes (penalty scored); Zambrano (penalty scored); Shockey (penalty scored); Scalzo (penalty missed)		(penalty scored) Kurtz; (penalty scored) Holden; (penalty scored) Enzugusi; (penalty scored) Owen; (penalty scored) Kljestan

March 21	Steel City FC (NPSL) **(Pennsylvania)**	**0–1**	**Michigan Stars FC (NISA)**	Pittsburgh, Pennsylvania
7:00 pm EDT		Report	Lellouch 83'	Stadium: Petersen Sports Complex; Attendance: 1,142; Referee: Alex Parent

March 21	FC Motown (NPSL) **(New Jersey)**	**0–3**	**(New York (state)) New York City FC II (MLSNP)**	Montclair, New Jersey
7:30 pm EDT		Report	Calheira 9'; Baiera 20'; Carrizo 65'	Stadium: MSU Soccer Park at Pittser Field; Attendance: 450; Referee: Harris Rasheed

March 21	**Chattanooga Red Wolves SC (USL1) (Tennessee)**	**4–2** (a.e.t.)	(Massachusetts) Brockton FC United (UPSL)	Harrison, Tennessee
7:30 pm EDT	Hernandez 26' (pen.); Marsh 66' (pen.); Mensah 116', 120'	Report	Fernandes 89'; Teixeira 90+5'	Stadium: Chattanooga Central High School; Attendance: 804; Referee: Kyle Johnston

March 21	Crown Legacy FC (MLSNP) (North Carolina)	**0–1**	**South Carolina United Heat (UPSL)**	Matthews, North Carolina
7:30 pm EDT		Report	Inalien 90+5' (pen.)	Stadium: Mecklenburg County Sportsplex; Attendance: 630; Referee: Shawn Tehini

March 21	Western Mass Pioneers (USL2) (Massachusetts)	**0–4**	**(Nebraska) Union Omaha (USL1)**	Ludlow, Massachusetts
7:30 pm EDT		Report	Gallardo 4', 73', 89'; Dos Santos 67'	Stadium: Lusitano Stadium; Attendance: 317; Referee: Stearne Briem

March 21	Vereinigung Erzgebirge (USL-P) (Pennsylvania)	**0–2**	**(North Carolina) Charlotte Independence (USL1)**	Langhorne, Pennsylvania
7:30 pm EDT		Report	Ciss 72'; Belmar 86'	Stadium: Cairn University Soccer Field; Attendance: 418; Referee: Vincent Whitmore

March 21	**Carolina Core FC (MLSNP) (North Carolina)**	**3–2**	**(Virginia)** NoVa FC (USL2)	Greensboro, North Carolina
7:30 pm EDT	Hadeed 18'; Polanco 50'; Jo. Rodriguez 82'	Report	Holmes 34'; Abril 40'	Stadium: UNCG Soccer Stadium; Attendance: 1,511; Referee: MJ Tehini

March 21	**Lubbock Matadors SC (NPSL) (Texas)**	**2–1** (a.e.t.)	**(Arizona)** Arizona Monsoon FC (NISA)	Lubbock, Texas
7:30 pm CDT	Martinez 83'; Najem 119'	Report	Fierro 37'	Stadium: LCU Soccer Field; Attendance: 2,258; Referee: Cuauhtemoc Delgadillo

March 21	**Colorado Rapids 2 (MLSNP)**	**3–0**	**(Colorado)** Azteca FC (CPL)	Commerce City, Colorado
7:30 pm MDT	Belluz 13'; D. Garcia 45'; Díaz 63'	Report		Stadium: Dick's Sporting Goods Park; Attendance: 1,042; Referee: Marcelo Soto

March 21	**Ventura County FC (MLSNP) (California)**	**2–1**	**(California)** Irvine Zeta FC 2 (UPSL)	Carson, California
7:30 pm PDT	Barry 11' (o.g.); Karani 45+1'	Report	Baumgartner 8' (pen.)	Stadium: Dignity Health Sports Park; Attendance: 179; Referee: Ben Meyer

=== Second round ===
The complete draw for the second round, including match dates and times, was announced on March 22, 2024.

All times local to game site.

April 2	**Richmond Kickers (USL1) (Virginia)**	**5–2**	**(Maryland)** Maryland Bobcats FC (NISA)	Richmond, Virginia
7:00 pm EDT	Vinyals 6' (pen.); O'Dwyer 20'; Barnathan 45+3', 88'; Sierakowski 83'	Report	Kooistra 24'; Espinal 71'	Stadium: City Stadium; Attendance: 1,267; Referee: David Elliott

April 2	**Charlotte Independence (USL1) (North Carolina)**	**0–0** (a.e.t.) (**4–3** p)	South Carolina United Heat (UPSL)	Charlotte, North Carolina
7:30 pm EDT		Report		Stadium: American Legion Memorial Stadium; Attendance: 350; Referee: John Rush
	**Penalties**
	Obregón (penalty missed); Spielman (penalty scored); Álvarez (penalty scored); Belmar (penalty scored); Ngah (penalty scored)		Nygård (penalty scored); Barrozo (penalty scored); Inalien (penalty missed); Fortune (penalty scored); Vlek (penalty missed)

April 2	**New York City FC II (MLSNP) (New York (state))**	**4–2**	(New Jersey) New York Red Bulls II (MLSNP)	New York City, New York
7:30 pm EDT	Jiménez 22', 38', 87' (pen.); Jones 45'	Report	Sofo 6'; Ngoma 47'	Stadium: Belson Stadium; Attendance: 719; Referee: Guido Gonzalez

April 2	**Lubbock Matadors SC (NPSL) (Texas)**	**2–0**	**(Texas)** Foro SC (UPSL)	Lubbock, Texas
7:30 pm CDT	Martinez 71'; Sasaki 90+3'	Report		Stadium: LCU Soccer Field; Attendance: 2,043; Referee: Collins Gitau

April 2	Minnesota United FC 2 (MLSNP)	**0–2** (a.e.t.)	**Michigan Stars FC (NISA)**	Saint Paul, Minnesota
7:30 pm CDT		Report	Konate 99'; Olson 106'	Stadium: Allianz Field; Attendance: 814; Referee: Chris Ruska

April 2	Central Valley Fuego FC (USL1) (California)	**1–2**	**(California) El Farolito SC (NPSL)**	Merced, California
7:30 pm PDT	Carrera-García 19' (pen.)	Report	Benson 45+2', 88'	Stadium: Bobcat Field; Attendance: 652; Referee: Jamie Padilla

April 3	**Miami United FC (USSL) (Florida)**	**2–0**	**(Florida)** Club de Lyon FC (NISA)	Pembroke Pines, Florida
6:00 pm EDT	Pajoy 27'; Melo Fernandez 56'			Stadium: UPSL Stadium; Attendance: 200

April 3	**South Georgia Tormenta FC (USL1) (Georgia (U.S. state))**	**4–0**	(Georgia (U.S. state)) Savannah Clovers FC (NISA)	Statesboro, Georgia
7:00 pm EDT	Watson 2'; Ramos 35'; Vivas 57'; Wehner 90'			Stadium: Optim Sports Medicine Field at Tormenta Stadium; Attendance: 1,946

April 3	One Knoxville SC (USL1) **(Tennessee)**	**2–3** (a.e.t.)	**(South Carolina) Greenville Triumph SC (USL1)**	Knoxville, Tennessee
7:00 pm EDT	Tekiela 18' (pen.), 62'		MacKinnon 15', 33'; Herrera 107'	Stadium: Regal Stadium; Attendance: 1,117

April 3	Vermont Green FC (USL2) **(Vermont)**	**1–2**	**(North Carolina) Carolina Core FC (MLSNP)**	Burlington, Vermont
7:00 pm EDT	Bazini 28' (pen.)		Ndoye 60' (pen.); Rodriguez 70'	Stadium: Virtue Field; Attendance: 2,500

April 3	Apotheos FC (NPSL) **(Georgia (U.S. state))**	**0–1**	**(Tennessee) Chattanooga Red Wolves SC (USL1)**	Atlanta, Georgia
7:30 pm EDT			Lukic 52'	Stadium: Atlanta Silverbacks Park; Attendance: 600

April 3	**Chicago Fire FC II (MLSNP) (Illinois)**	**2–0**	**(Wisconsin)** Forward Madison FC (USL1)	Bridgeview, Illinois
7:00 pm CDT	Poręba 11'; Shokalook 90'			Stadium: SeatGeek Stadium; Attendance: 198

April 3	**Union Omaha (USL1) (Nebraska)**	**3–1**	**(Iowa)** Des Moines Menace (USL2)	Omaha, Nebraska
7:30 pm CDT	Dolabella 34'; Milanese 48'; Kunga 90+9'		Enzugusi 87'	Stadium: Al F. Caniglia Field; Attendance: 890

April 3	Colorado Rapids 2 (MLSNP)	**2–3** (a.e.t.)	**Northern Colorado Hailstorm FC (USL1)**	Commerce City, Colorado
7:30 pm MDT	Frederick 47'; Stewart-Baynes 90+3'		Hernández 58'; Hoard 80'; García 120+1'	Stadium: Dick's Sporting Goods Park; Attendance: 446

April 3	Ventura County FC (MLSNP) **(California)**	**0–3**	**(California) Irvine Zeta FC (NISA)**	Carson, California
7:30 pm PDT			Espinoza 45'; Almeida 61'; Salceda 88'	Stadium: Dignity Health Sports Park; Attendance: 350

April 3	**Spokane Velocity FC (USL1) (Washington (state))**	**1–0**	**(California)** Los Angeles Force (NISA)	Spokane, Washington
7:30 pm PDT	Gil 85'			Stadium: One Spokane Stadium; Attendance: 2,423; Referee: Elorm Atisu

=== Third round ===
The complete draw for the third round, including match dates and times, was announced on April 4, 2024.

==== Groups ====
Draw groups
Northeast Region	Atlantic Region	Southeast Region	South Region	North Region	Midwest Region	West Region
Charlotte Independence; Hartford Athletic; New York City FC II; Rhode Island FC	Carolina Core FC; Loudoun United FC; North Carolina FC; Richmond Kickers	Memphis 901 FC; Miami FC; Miami United FC; South Georgia Tormenta FC	Birmingham Legion FC; Chattanooga Red Wolves SC; Greenville Triumph SC; Louisville City FC	Chicago Fire FC II; Detroit City FC; Indy Eleven; Michigan Stars FC	El Paso Locomotive FC; FC Tulsa; Lubbock Matadors SC; New Mexico United; Northern Colorado Hailstorm FC; Union Omaha	El Farolito SC; Irvine Zeta FC; Las Vegas Lights FC; Monterey Bay FC; Oakland Roots SC; Spokane Velocity FC

==== Matches ====
All times local to game site.

April 16	**Louisville City FC (USLC) (Kentucky)**	**3–1**	**(South Carolina)** Greenville Triumph SC (USL1)	Louisville Kentucky
	Totsch 2'; Harris 49'; González 90+7'		Anderson 90+3'	Stadium: Lynn Family Stadium; Attendance: 4,373

April 16	**Detroit City FC (USLC) (Michigan)**	**1–0**	**(Michigan)** Michigan Stars FC (NISA)	Hamtramck, Michigan
	Rodriguez 90+3'			Stadium: Keyworth Stadium; Attendance: 2,017

April 16	**Charlotte Independence (USL1) (North Carolina)**	**4–4** (a.e.t.) (**5–4** p)	**(Rhode Island)** Rhode Island FC (USLC)	Charlotte, North Carolina
	Obregón 26' (pen.) 95'; Mbuyu 35'; Álvarez 72'	Report	McGlynn 11'; Messer 45+2'; Holstad 50'; Turnbull 115'	Stadium: American Legion Memorial Stadium; Attendance: 3,865
	**Penalties**
	Belmar (penalty scored); Mbuyu (penalty scored); Álvarez (penalty missed); Spielman (penalty scored); Dimick (penalty missed); Djedje (penalty scored); Sorenson (penalty scored)		Dikwa (penalty missed); Fuson (penalty scored); Kwizera (penalty scored); Doyle (penalty scored); Brito (penalty missed); Holstad (penalty scored); Alves (penalty missed)

April 16	**New Mexico United (USLC)**	**3–1**	**(Texas)** Lubbock Matadors SC (NPSL)	Rio Rancho, New Mexico
	Swartz 58'; Bruce 59'; Akale 62'	Report	Sasaki 90' (pen.)	Stadium: Rio Rancho High School Stadium; Attendance: 1,200

April 16	**Oakland Roots SC (USLC) (California)**	**2–1** (a.e.t.)	**(California)** El Farolito SC (NPSL)	Hayward, California
	Diaz 45+1'; Elmasnaouy 98'	Report	Benson 12'	Stadium: CSU East Bay; Attendance: 1,500

April 17	Hartford Athletic (USLC) **(Connecticut)**	**2–3** (a.e.t.)	**(New York (state)) New York City FC II (MLSNP)**	Hartford, Connecticut
	Williams 81' (pen.); Beckford 92'	Report	Calheira 63', 99'; Carrizo 109'	Stadium: Trinity Health Stadium; Attendance: 2,552

April 17	**North Carolina FC (USLC)**	**1–0**	**(North Carolina)** Carolina Core FC (MLSNP)	Cary, North Carolina
	Placias 60'	Report		Stadium: WakeMed Soccer Park; Attendance: 1,112; Referee: Josh Parke

April 17	**Memphis 901 FC (USLC) (Tennessee)**	**2–0**	**(Florida)** Miami United FC (USSL)	Memphis, Tennessee
	Pickering 31', 85'	Report		Stadium: AutoZone Park; Attendance: 724

April 17	Richmond Kickers (USL1) **(Virginia)**	**0–0** (a.e.t.) (**4–5** p)	**(Virginia) Loudoun United FC (USLC)**	Richmond, Virginia
		Report		Stadium: City Stadium; Attendance: 1,439
	**Penalties**
	Vinyals (penalty scored); Billhardt (penalty scored); Barnathan (penalty scored); Vaughan (penalty scored); Bosua (penalty missed)		Ryan (penalty scored); Tingey (penalty scored); Leerman (penalty scored); Aboukoura (penalty scored); Skundrich (penalty scored)

April 17	Miami FC (ULSC) **(Florida)**	**2–4**	**(Georgia (U.S. state)) South Georgia Tormenta FC (USL1)**	Miami, Florida
	Luisinho 20', 45+8'	Report	Dengler 12'; Doyle 69'; Stretch 88'; Vivas 90'	Stadium: FIU Soccer Stadium; Attendance: 471

April 17	**FC Tulsa (USLC) (Oklahoma)**	**2–1**	**(Colorado)** Northern Colorado Hailstorm FC (USL1)	Tulsa, Oklahoma
	Pacheco 39' (pen.); Yosef 45+1'	Report	Martinez 65'	Stadium: University of Tulsa Soccer and Track Stadium; Attendance: 300

April 17	**Birmingham Legion FC (USLC) (Alabama)**	**4–2** (a.e.t.)	**(Tennessee)** Chattanooga Red Wolves SC (USL1)	Montevallo, Alabama
	Pinho 48', 80', 105+1', 107'	Report	Folla 12'; Ruiz 76' (pen.)	Stadium: University of Montevallo; Attendance: 300

April 17	Chicago Fire FC II (MLSNP) **(Illinois)**	**0–1**	**(Indiana) Indy Eleven (USLC)**	Bridgeview, Illinois
		Report	Martínez 4'	Stadium: SeatGeek Stadium; Attendance: 326

April 17	**Union Omaha (USL1) (Nebraska)**	**0–0** (a.e.t.) (**5–3** p)	**(Texas)** El Paso Locomotive FC (ULSC)	Omaha, Nebraska
		Report		Stadium: Werner Park; Attendance: 864
	**Penalties**
	Gallardo (penalty scored); Mastrantonio (penalty scored); Aoumaich (penalty scored); Dolabella (penalty scored); Bronnik (penalty scored)		Calvillo (penalty scored); Alfaro (penalty scored); Pelúa (penalty missed); Dhillon (penalty scored)

April 17	**Monterey Bay FC (USLC) (California)**	**2–1**	**(California)** Irvine Zeta FC (NISA)	Seaside, California
	Ayon 32', 65'	Report	Almeida 62'	Stadium: Cardinale Stadium; Attendance: 2,564

April 17	**Las Vegas Lights FC (USLC) (Nevada)**	**2–1** (a.e.t.)	**(Washington (state))** Spokane Velocity FC (USL1)	Las Vegas, Nevada
	Noël 51'; Alba 112'	Report	Lewis 90+6'	Stadium: Cashman Field; Attendance: 1,197

== Round of 32 and 16 ==
The draw for the round of 32 and 16 was announced on April 18, 2024. Schedule and locations for the round of 32 were also announced. The schedule and locations for the round of 16 were announced on May 9.

=== Groups ===
Draw groups
Alonso Division	Gonsalves Division	Hakala–Nolan Division	LeToux Division	Lopez Division	Mark Division	Onstad Division	Watson Division
Atlanta United FC; Charleston Battery; Charlotte Independence; South Georgia Tormenta FC	Birmingham Legion FC; FC Dallas; Memphis 901 FC; Tampa Bay Rowdies	FC Tulsa; Pittsburgh Riverhounds SC; Sporting Kansas City; Union Omaha	Louisville City FC; North Carolina FC; Phoenix Rising FC; Seattle Sounders FC	Monterey Bay F.C. Oakland Roots SC; Sacramento Republic FC; San Jose Earthquakes	Las Vegas Lights FC; Los Angeles FC; Loudoun United FC; Orange County SC	Detroit City FC; Houston Dynamo FC; Indy Eleven; San Antonio FC	Colorado Springs Switchbacks FC; New Mexico United; New York City FC II; Real Salt Lake

=== Bracket ===
Round of 32; May 7–8
**USLC**	**(South Carolina) Charleston Battery (a.e.t.)**	**3**
USL1	(Georgia (U.S. state)) South Georgia Tormenta FC	2
**MLS**	**(Georgia (U.S. state)) Atlanta United FC**	**3**
USL1	(North Carolina) Charlotte Independence	0
**USLC**	**(Florida) Tampa Bay Rowdies (a.e.t.)**	**6**
USLC	(Alabama) Birmingham Legion FC	4
**MLS**	**(Texas) FC Dallas**	**1**
USLC	(Tennessee) Memphis 901 FC	0
USL1	(Nebraska) Union Omaha	1
**MLS**	**Sporting Kansas City (a.e.t.)**	**2**
USLC	(Pennsylvania) Pittsburgh Riverhounds SC	0
**USLC**	**(Oklahoma) FC Tulsa**	**1**
**MLS**	**(Washington (state)) Seattle Sounders FC (p)**	**2 (5)**
USLC	(Kentucky) Louisville City FC	2 (4)
USLC	North Carolina FC	1
**USLC**	**(Arizona) Phoenix Rising FC (a.e.t.)**	**2**
**USLC**	**(California) Sacramento Republic FC**	**2**
USLC	(California) Monterey Bay FC	0
**MLS**	**(California) San Jose Earthquakes**	**1**
USLC	(California) Oakland Roots SC	0
USLC	(Nevada) Las Vegas Lights FC	1
**MLS**	**(California) Los Angeles FC**	**3**
USLC	(California) Orange County SC	1
**USLC**	**(Virginia) Loudoun United FC**	**2**
**USLC**	**(Indiana) Indy Eleven**	**2**
USLC	(Texas) San Antonio FC	0
MLS	(Texas) Houston Dynamo FC	3 (9)
**USLC**	**(Michigan) Detroit City FC (p)**	**3 (10)**
**MLSNP**	**(New York (state)) New York City FC II**	**1**
USLC	Colorado Springs Switchbacks FC	0
**USLC**	**New Mexico United**	**4**
MLS	(Utah) Real Salt Lake	2

Round of 16; May 21–22
USLC	(South Carolina) Charleston Battery	0 (4)
**MLS**	**(Georgia (U.S. state)) Atlanta United FC (p)**	**0 (5)**
USLC	(Florida) Tampa Bay Rowdies	1
**MLS**	**(Texas) FC Dallas**	**2**
**MLS**	**Sporting Kansas City**	**4**
USLC	(Oklahoma) FC Tulsa	0
**MLS**	**(Washington (state)) Seattle Sounders FC**	**2**
USLC	(Arizona) Phoenix Rising FC	1
**USLC**	**(California) Sacramento Republic FC (a.e.t.)**	**4**
MLS	(California) San Jose Earthquakes	3
**MLS**	**(California) Los Angeles FC**	**3**
USLC	(Virginia) Loudoun United FC	0
**USLC**	**(Indiana) Indy Eleven**	**3**
USLC	(Michigan) Detroit City FC	0
MLSNP	(New York (state)) New York City FC II	0
**USLC**	**New Mexico United**	**3**

Host team listed first
Bold = winner

=== Round of 32 ===
All times local to game site.

May 7	Pittsburgh Riverhounds SC **(Pennsylvania)**	**0–1**	**(Oklahoma) FC Tulsa**	Pittsburgh, Pennsylvania
19:00 EDT		Report	Goodrum 88'	Stadium: Highmark Stadium; Attendance: 1,131; Referee: Brad Jensen

May 7	**Atlanta United FC (Georgia (U.S. state))**	**3–0**	**(North Carolina)** Charlotte Independence	Kennesaw, Georgia
19:30 EDT	Firmino 52', 71'; Ríos 85'	Report		Stadium: Fifth Third Stadium; Attendance: 2,522; Referee: Lorenzo Hernandez

May 7	Houston Dynamo FC **(Texas)**	**3–3** (**9–10** p)	**(Michigan) Detroit City FC**	Houston, Texas
19:00 CDT	Dorsey 6'; Blessing 31'; Carrasquilla 77'	Report	Williams 41'; Matthews 75'; Rodriguez 83'	Stadium: Shell Energy Stadium; Attendance: 7,540; Referee: Elvis Osmanovic
	**Penalties**
	Bassi (penalty scored); Kowalczyk (penalty scored); Carrasquilla (penalty scored); Greguš (penalty scored); Ibrahim (penalty missed); Sviatchenko (penalty scored); Bartlow (penalty scored); Dorsey (penalty scored); Schmitt (penalty scored); Artur (penalty scored); Tarbell (penalty missed)		(penalty scored) Matthews; (penalty scored) Villanueva; (penalty missed) Morris; (penalty scored) Murphy; (penalty scored) Bryant; (penalty scored) Gasso; (penalty scored) Espeleta; (penalty scored) Amoo-Mensah; (penalty scored) Rutz; (penalty scored) Carroll; (penalty scored) Saldaña

May 7	**FC Dallas (Texas)**	**1–0**	**(Tennessee)** Memphis 901 FC	Frisco, Texas
19:30 CDT	Farrington 73'	Report		Stadium: Toyota Stadium; Attendance: 4,511

May 7	**San Jose Earthquakes (California)**	**1–0**	**(California)** Oakland Roots SC	San Jose, California
19:00 PDT	Bouda 76'	Report		Stadium: PayPal Park; Attendance: 5,000

May 7	Orange County SC **(California)**	**1–2**	**(Virginia) Loudoun United FC**	Irvine, California
19:00 PDT	Amang 62'	Report	Leggett 22', 64'	Stadium: Championship Soccer Stadium; Attendance: 1,749

May 7	**Sacramento Republic FC (California)**	**2–0**	**(California)** Monterey Bay FC	Sacramento, California
19:30 PDT	Greene 27' (o.g.); Phillips 31'	Report		Stadium: Heart Health Park; Attendance: 2,900

May 8	**Charleston Battery (South Carolina)**	**3–2** (a.e.t.)	**(Georgia (U.S. state))** South Georgia Tormenta FC	Mount Pleasant, South Carolina
19:00 EDT	Myers 21', 45+3', 120+1'	Report	Fonseca 40'; Rodriguez 83'	Stadium: Patriots Point Soccer Complex; Attendance: 998

May 8	North Carolina FC **(North Carolina)**	**1–2** (a.e.t.)	**(Arizona) Phoenix Rising FC**	Cary, North Carolina
19:00 EDT	Craig (yellow card) 9' (red card) 40'; Malou (yellow card) 54' (goal) 80'; Somersall (yellow card) 85'; Anderson (yellow card) 86'; Armstrong (yellow card) 90+2' (red card) 95'; Placias (yellow card) 90+6'		Wyke (yellow card) 7' (red card) 24'; Azócar 9' (yellow card) 90+8'; Doratiotto (yellow card) 110' (goal) 111'; Gallardo (yellow card) 117'	Stadium: WakeMed Soccer Park; Attendance: 822

May 8	**Indy Eleven (Indiana)**	**2–0**	**(Texas)** San Antonio FC	Indianapolis, Indiana
19:00 EDT	Williams 2'; Blake 10'	Report		Stadium: Bud and Jackie Sellick Bowl; Attendance: 4,086

May 8	**New York City FC II (New York (state))**	**1–0**	**(Colorado)** Colorado Springs Switchbacks FC	New York City, New York
19:30 EDT	Jimenez 6'	Report		Stadium: Belson Stadium; Attendance: 360

May 8	**Tampa Bay Rowdies (Florida)**	**6–4** (a.e.t.)	**(Alabama)** Birmingham Legion FC	St. Petersburg, Florida
19:30 EDT	Rivera 25'; Jennings 33', 45+6', 79'; Arteaga 101', 109'	Report	Martínez 82'; Hernandez-Foster 89'; Pasher 90+3', 90+6' (pen.)	Stadium: Al Lang Stadium; Attendance: 2,195

May 8	Union Omaha **(Nebraska)**	**1–2** (a.e.t.)	**Sporting Kansas City**	Omaha, Nebraska
19:00 CDT	Kunga 31'		Tzionis 48'; Pulido 120'	Stadium: Al F. Caniglia Field; Attendance: 4,733

May 8	**New Mexico United**	**4–2**	**(Utah)** Real Salt Lake	Albuquerque, New Mexico
19:00 MDT	Bailey 17', 19'; Hernandez 45+4'; Reyes 89'	Report	Barajas 35'; Luna 49'	Stadium: Isotopes Park; Attendance: 5,266; Referee: Malik Badawi

May 8	**Seattle Sounders FC (Washington (state))**	**2–2** (a.e.t.) (**5–4** p)	(Kentucky) Louisville City FC	Tukwila, Washington
19:30 PDT	Rothrock 41'; Musovski 62'		Totsch 67' (pen.); Gonzalez 89'	Stadium: Starfire Sports; Attendance: 3,207; Referee: Ricardo Ocampo
	**Penalties**
	Musovski (penalty missed); Leyva (penalty scored); Lopez (penalty scored); Léo Chú (penalty missed); Brunell (penalty scored); De Rosario (penalty missed); Kossa-Rienzi (penalty scored); Thomas (penalty scored)		(penalty missed) Totsch; (penalty missed) Wynder; (penalty scored) Ordoñez; (penalty scored) Davila; (penalty scored) McCabe; (penalty missed) Gleadle; (penalty scored) Wilson; (penalty missed) Adams

May 8	Las Vegas Lights FC (Nevada)	**1–3**	**(California) Los Angeles FC**	Las Vegas, Nevada
19:30 PDT	Smart 56'		Kamara 47'; Olivera 70', 90+1'	Stadium: Cashman Field; Attendance: 3,495; Referee: James Duling

=== Round of 16 ===
All times local to game site.

May 21	Charleston Battery **(South Carolina)**	**0–0** (**4–5** p)	**(Georgia (U.S. state)) Atlanta United FC**	Mount Pleasant, South Carolina
7:00 PM EDT				Stadium: Patriots Point Soccer Complex; Attendance: 5,000; Referee: Fabio Tovar
	**Penalties**
	Rodríguez (penalty scored); Conway (penalty scored); Myers (penalty scored); Smith (penalty scored); Gutierrez (penalty missed); Molloy (penalty missed)		(penalty missed) Lennon; (penalty scored) Ríos; (penalty scored) Slisz; (penalty scored) Hernández; (penalty scored) Firmino; (penalty scored) Gregersen

May 21	New York City FC II **(New York (state))**	**0–3**	**New Mexico United**	New York City, New York
7:30 PM EDT			Flanagan 50'; Maples 65'; Herbert 86'	Stadium: Belson Stadium; Attendance: 534; Referee: Joshua Encarnación

May 21	**Sporting Kansas City**	**4–0**	**(Oklahoma)** FC Tulsa	Kansas City, Kansas
7:30 PM CDT	Hernández 38', 63'; Afrifa 45+3'; Tzionis 65'			Stadium: Children's Mercy Park; Attendance: 10,088; Referee: Jorge Gonzalez

May 21	**Sacramento Republic FC (California)**	**4–3** (a.e.t.)	**(California)** San Jose Earthquakes	Sacramento, California
7:00 PM PDT	Phillips 17', 38'; Luis Felipe 106'; Herrera 107'		Judd 11'; Espinoza 80'; López 100'	Stadium: Heart Health Park; Attendance: 5,817; Referee: Allen Chapman

May 21	**Los Angeles FC (California)**	**3–0**	**(Virginia)** Loudoun United FC	Los Angeles, California
7:30 PM PDT	Tillman 8'; Olivera 52'; Ángel 61'			Stadium: BMO Stadium; Attendance: 4,689; Referee: Geoff Cameron

May 22	**Indy Eleven (Indiana)**	**3–0**	**(Michigan)** Detroit City FC	Indianapolis, Indiana
7:00 PM EDT	Stephen Carroll 14' (o.g.); Williams 33'; Ofeimu 36'			Stadium: IU Michael A. Carroll Stadium; Referee: Yosuke Araki

May 22	Tampa Bay Rowdies **(Florida)**	**1–2**	**(Texas) FC Dallas**	St. Petersburg, Florida
7:30 PM EDT	Pérez 85' (pen.)	Report	Delgado 15'; Farrington 26'	Stadium: Al Lang Stadium; Attendance: 1,862; Referee: Guido Gonzalez

May 22	**Seattle Sounders FC (Washington (state))**	**2–1**	**(Arizona)** Phoenix Rising FC	Tukwila, Washington
7:30 PM PDT	Roldan 68' (pen.); Kossa-Rienzi 88'		Cabral 45+5' (pen.)	Stadium: Starfire Sports; Attendance: 3,314; Referee: Brandon Stevis

== Quarterfinals and beyond ==
=== Bracket ===
Quarterfinals; July 9–10
**MLS**	**Sporting Kansas City (a.e.t.)**	**2**
MLS	(Texas) FC Dallas	1
MLS	(Georgia (U.S. state)) Atlanta United FC	1
**USLC**	**(Indiana) Indy Eleven**	**2**
USLC	(California) Sacramento Republic FC	1
**MLS**	**(Washington (state)) Seattle Sounders FC**	**2**
**MLS**	**(California) Los Angeles FC**	**3**
USLC	New Mexico United	1

Semifinals; August 27–28
**MLS**	**Sporting Kansas City**	**2**
USLC	(Indiana) Indy Eleven	0
MLS	(Washington (state)) Seattle Sounders FC	0
**MLS**	**(California) Los Angeles FC**	**1**

Final; September 25
MLS	Sporting Kansas City	1
**MLS**	**(California) Los Angeles FC (a.e.t.)**	**3**

Bold = winner

=== Quarterfinals ===
July 9	Atlanta United FC **(Georgia (U.S. state))**	**1–2**	**(Indiana) Indy Eleven**	Kennesaw, Georgia
7:00 PM EDT	Firmino 90+2'	Report	Williams 31'; McCarty 83' (o.g.)	Stadium: Fifth Third Stadium; Attendance: 2,417; Referee: Sergii Demianchuk

July 9	Sacramento Republic FC **(California)**	**1–2**	**(Washington (state)) Seattle Sounders FC**	Sacramento, California
8:00 PM PDT	Herrera 49'	Report	Atencio 16'; Morris 31'	Stadium: Heart Health Park; Attendance: 11,569; Referee: Ted Unkel

July 10	**Sporting Kansas City**	**2–1** (a.e.t.)	**(Texas)** FC Dallas	Kansas City, Kansas
8:00 PM CDT	Agada 77'; Rosero 111'	Report	Musa 86'	Stadium: Children's Mercy Park; Attendance: 12,943; Referee: Tim Ford

July 10	**Los Angeles FC (California)**	**3–1**	**(New Mexico)** New Mexico United	Los Angeles, California
8:00 PM PDT	Tillman 6'; Martínez 37'; Bogusz 77'	Report	Hurst 57'	Stadium: BMO Stadium; Attendance: 7,846; Referee: Allen Chapman

=== Semifinals ===
August 27	**Sporting Kansas City**	**2–0**	**(Indiana)** Indy Eleven	Kansas City, Kansas
7:00 PM CDT	Russell 14'; Rosero 35'	Report		Stadium: Children's Mercy Park; Attendance: 10,812; Referee: Rosendo Mendoza

August 28	Seattle Sounders FC **(Washington (state))**	**0–1**	**(California) Los Angeles FC**	Tukwila, Washington
7:30 PM PDT		Report	Bouanga 83' (pen.)	Stadium: Starfire Sports; Attendance: 4,109; Referee: Ricardo Fierro

=== Final ===
September 25, 2024
7:30 pm PDT

Los Angeles FC (California)	3–1 (a.e.t.)	Sporting Kansas City
Giroud 53'; Campos 102'; Kamara 109'	Reports: USSF; MLS	Thommy 60'

BMO Stadium, Los Angeles, California
Attendance: 22,214
Referee: Armando Villarreal

== Broadcasting ==
TNT Sports holds the rights to broadcast the Open Cup from 2023 to 2030, as part of a larger media rights agreement with U.S. Soccer. All games through the round of 16 were broadcast on the websites of U.S. Soccer, United Soccer League, and Major League Soccer. All games from the quarter-finals to the final were broadcast on MLS Season Pass on Apple TV.

== Top goal scorers ==
Team eliminated for this round.
Team was inactive for this round.

Rank	Player	Team	Goals	By round							
Rank	Player	Team	Goals	1R	2R	3R	R32	R16	QF	SF	F
1	(Honduras) Dembor Benson	El Farolito SC	4	1	2	1					
1	(Mexico) Jonathan Jiménez	New York City FC II	4		3		1				
1	(Brazil) Stefano Pinho	Birmingham Legion FC	4			4					
4	(United States) Jordan Adebayo-Smith	Minnesota United FC 2	3	3							
4	(United States) Taylor Calheira	New York City FC II	3	1		2					
4	(Honduras) Darwin Espinal	Maryland Bobcats FC	3	2	1						
4	(Brazil) Nicolas Firmino	Atlanta United FC	3				2		1		
4	(United States) Joe Gallardo	Union Omaha	3	3							
4	(United States) Cal Jennings	Tampa Bay Rowdies	3				3				
4	(United States) MD Myers	Charleston Battery	3				3				
4	(Uruguay) Cristian Olivera	Los Angeles FC	3				2	1			
4	(England) Kieran Phillips	Sacramento Republic FC	3				1	2			
4	(Sierra Leone) Augustine Williams	Indy Eleven	3				1	1	1		
