= Wallis Lapsley =

American soccer player

Personal information
- Date of birth: April 14, 1997 (age 29)
- Place of birth: Seattle, Washington, United States
- Height: 1.96 m (6 ft 5 in)
- Position: Goalkeeper

College career
Years	Team	Apps	(Gls)
2016–2019	UC Davis Aggies	65	(0)

Senior career*
Years	Team	Apps	(Gls)
2019	Des Moines Menace	0	(0)
2020	New York Red Bulls II	11	(0)
2021	FC Tucson	28	(0)
2022–2023	Tacoma Defiance	12	(0)
2022	→ Seattle Sounders FC (loan)	0	(0)
2024	Union Omaha	1	(0)
2025	Forward Madison	12	(0)
Total		64	(0)
- * Club domestic league appearances and goals

Wallis Lapsley (born April 14, 1997) is a former American soccer player who played as a goalkeeper.

== Career ==
Lapsley was selected by the New York Red Bulls with the 36th pick in the second round of the 2020 MLS SuperDraft. In March 2020, Lapsley signed with the Red Bulls' USL Championship club New York Red Bulls II. He made his professional debut on March 7, starting in a 1–0 loss against Tampa Bay Rowdies. He was released by Red Bulls II on November 30, 2020. Lapsley signed with FC Tucson on February 4, 2021.

On March 18, 2022, it was announced that Lapsley had joined MLS Next Pro side Tacoma Defiance. On March 20, 2022, Lapsley made an emergency loan to Tacoma's Major League Soccer parent club Seattle Sounders FC for their fixture against Austin FC, where he made the bench.

On February 6, 2024, Lapsley signed with USL League One side Union Omaha.

Prior to the 2025 season, Lapsley moved to rival USL League One club Forward Madison FC.

Following the 2025 season, Lapsley announced his retirement from professional soccer on his Instagram.
