= Blake Malone =

American soccer player (born 2001)

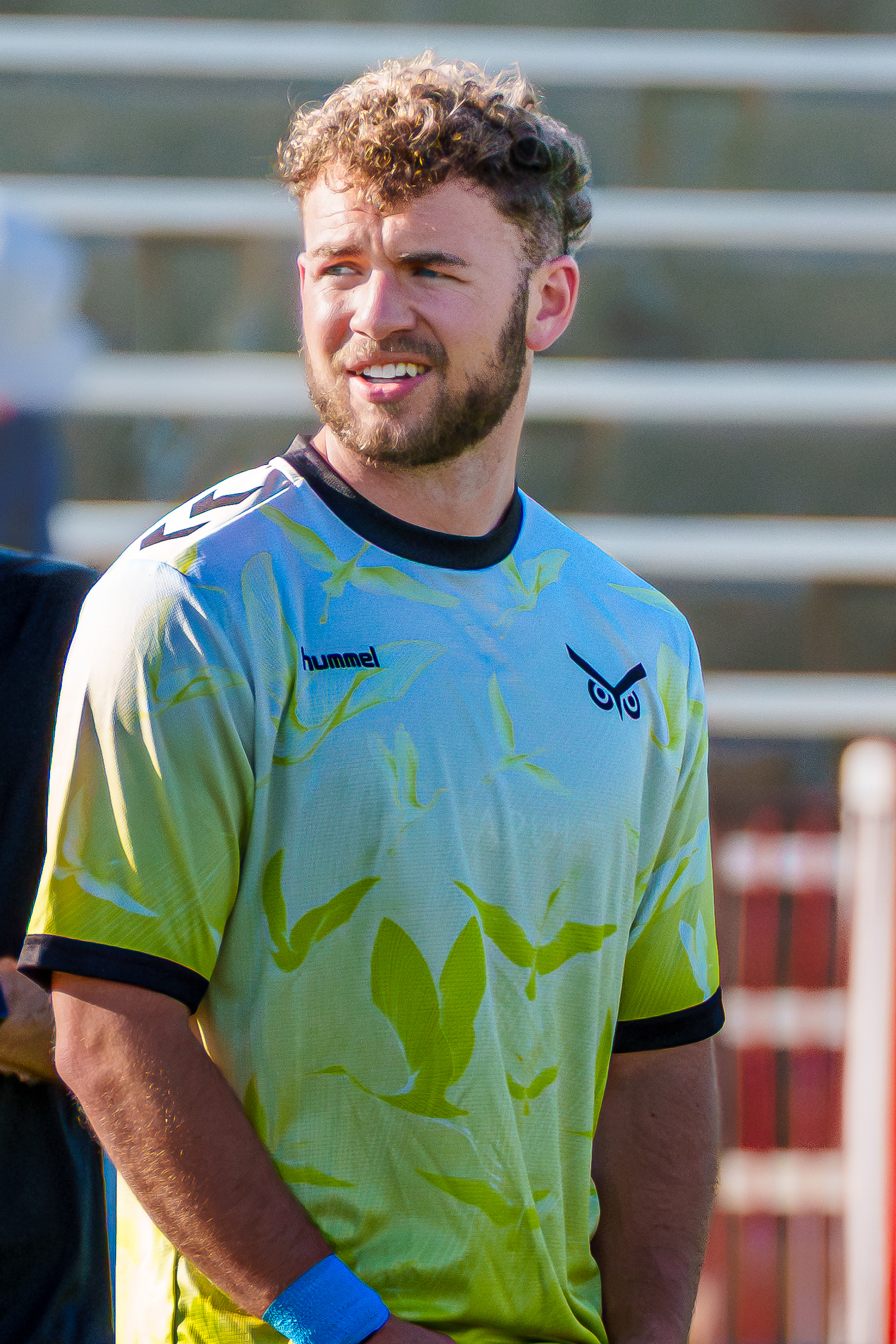
- Maline with Union Omaha in 2026

Personal information
- Full name: Blake Malone
- Date of birth: March 23, 2001 (age 25)
- Place of birth: Omaha, Nebraska, United States
- Height: 6 ft 0 in (1.83 m)
- Position: Defender

Team information
- Current team: Union Omaha
- Number: 3

Youth career
- 2009–2017: Downtown Las Vegas SC
- 2017–2019: Seattle Sounders FC

College career
Years	Team	Apps	(Gls)
2019	North Carolina Tar Heels	15	(1)

Senior career*
Years	Team	Apps	(Gls)
2018	Seattle Sounders FC 2	6	(0)
2020–2022	Orange County SC	0	(0)
2021	→ Union Omaha (loan)	13	(0)
2022–2023	Colorado Rapids 2	43	(4)
2024–	Union Omaha	38	(2)
- * Club domestic league appearances and goals as of October 31, 2026

Blake Malone (born March 23, 2001) is an American soccer player who currently plays for Union Omaha in USL League One.

== Career ==
Malone was part of the Seattle Sounders FC academy, and appeared for their USL affiliate side Seattle Sounders FC 2 during their 2018 season.

After leaving the Seattle Sounders academy, Malone began to play college soccer at the University of North Carolina at Chapel Hill in 2019.

In March 2021, Orange County SC loaned Malone to USL League One club Union Omaha for the 2021 season.

After two seasons with Colorado Rapids 2 in MLS Next Pro, Malone returned to Omaha on January 9, 2024.
