= Joe Gallardo =

American jazz musician and composer

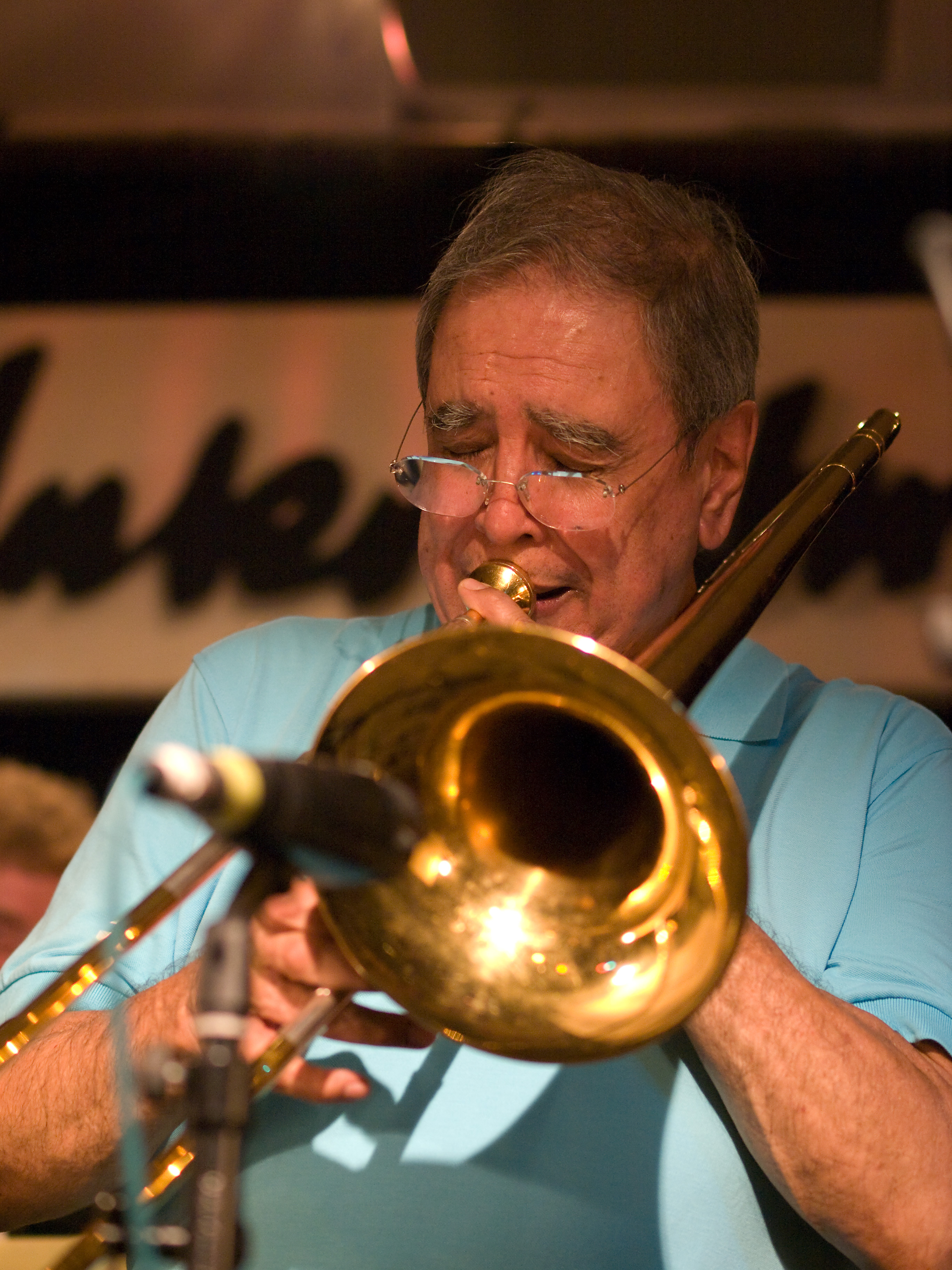
- Joe Gallardo at the Unterfahrt Jazz Club in Munich, 2009

Background information
- Birth name: Jose Gallardo
- Born: September 22, 1939 (age 85); Corpus Christi, Texas, United States
- Genres: Latin jazz, jazz
- Occupation(s): Musician, composer and teacher
- Instrument(s): Piano, trumpet, trombone

Jose "Joe" Gallardo (born September 22, 1939) is an American jazz musician and composer.

== Awards and honors ==
- 2008: South Texas Music Walk of Fame

== Discography ==
=== As leader ===
- 1975: Sol - Sol
- 1981: Latino Blue
- 2002: A Latin Shade of Blue
- 2004: Latin Jazz Latino with the NDR Big Band

=== As sideman ===
With Luis Gasca

- 1968: The Little Giant
- 1974: Born to Love You
- 1976: Collage

With Little Joe y La Familia

- 1972: Para La Gente
- 1973: Total

With Mongo Santamaria

- 1975: Mongo / Lady Guajira
- 1977: Dawn (Amanecer)Feat Ruben Blades on Vocals

With Roberto Santamaria

- 2013: Fiesta Al Jazz
- 2015: The Conga King

With others

- 1971: Arnett Cobb - The Wild Man from Texas
- 1973: La Tortilla Factory - La Tortilla Factory
- 1979: Mel Lewis and New Quintet - The New Mel Lewis Quintet Live
- 1988: Peter Herbolzheimer Rhythm Combination & Brass - Live in Concert Peter Herbolzheimer Rhythm Combination & Brass
- 2005: Pee Wee Ellis - Different Rooms
- 2012: Jerry Tilitz & Joe Gallardo - An Exciting Jazz Trombone Summit
- 2015: The Windwalkers - The Windwalkers

- Most Notable Songs:Dawn (Amanecer)Composer: Won Grammy- (Mongo Santamaría Feat Ruben Blades on Vocals
- Las Nubes: Little Joe y La Familia-Chicano/Tejano Anthem Producer & Arranger
- La Malagueña: Tortilla Factory- Producer & Arranger
