= Vivas =

Vivas is a surname. Notable people with the surname include:

- Achito Vivas (born 1934), Colombian footballer
- Anaís Vivas (born 1989), Venezuelan singer
- Ángel Vivas (born 1956), Venezuelan general
- Borja Vivas (born 1984), Spanish shot putter
- César Pérez Vivas (born 1957), Venezuelan lawyer and politician
- Claudio Vivas (born 1968), Argentine football manager and former goalkeeper
- Darío Vivas (1950–2020), Venezuelan politician
- Eliseo Vivas (1901-1991), Columbian-American philosopher and literary theorist
- Félix Saurí Vivas, Puerto Rican businessman
- Francisco Morales Vivas (born 1971), Argentine retired judoka
- Gonzalo Vivas (born 1993), Argentine footballer
- Jorbit Vivas (born 2001), Venezuelan baseball player
- José Vivas (born 1928), Venezuelan architect
- Juan Jesús Vivas (born 1953), Spanish politician
- Kathy Vivas (born 1972), Venezuelan astrophysicist
- Lindy Vivas, American volleyball player and coach
- Mayco Vivas (born 1998), Argentine rugby union player
- Nelson Vivas (born 1969), Argentine footballer
