= Malick Dembele =

Malian footballer

Malick Dembélé
Personal information
- Full name: Malick Zanké Dembélé
- Date of birth: 5 April 2004 (age 22)
- Place of birth: Mali
- Height: 1.80 m (5 ft 11 in)
- Position: Midfielder

Youth career
- 2015–2020: Yeelen Olympique

Senior career*
Years	Team	Apps	(Gls)
2021–	Yeelen Olympique	32	(9)
2024–2025	→ New York Red Bulls II (loan)	26	(3)
- * Club domestic league appearances and goals as of 21:47, 24 October 2025 (UTC)

Malick Dembélé (born 5 April 2004) is a Malian footballer who plays as a midfielder for Yeelen Olympique.

== Club career ==
=== Yeelen Olympique ===
Born in Mali, Dembélé joined the youth academy of Yeelen Olympique in 2015. In 2021, at the age of 17, he made his debut with the first team and featured regularly as an attacking midfielder. During this span, he has made 32 appearances for the club, scoring nine goals and assisting on nine others.

While with Yeelen Olympique, Dembélé went on trial with Spain's Sevilla FC.

==== Loan to New York Red Bulls II ====
On 8 March 2024, Dembélé joined MLS Next Pro side New York Red Bulls II on a loan from Yeelen Olympique. Dembélé made his debut for New York on 20 March 2024, appearing as a second-half substitute for Mohammed Sofo in a 5–1 victory over Hudson Valley Hammers in the first round of the U.S. Open Cup, Dembélé would also record his first goal for the club in this match.
