= Joe Gallardo (soccer) =

American soccer player (born 1998)

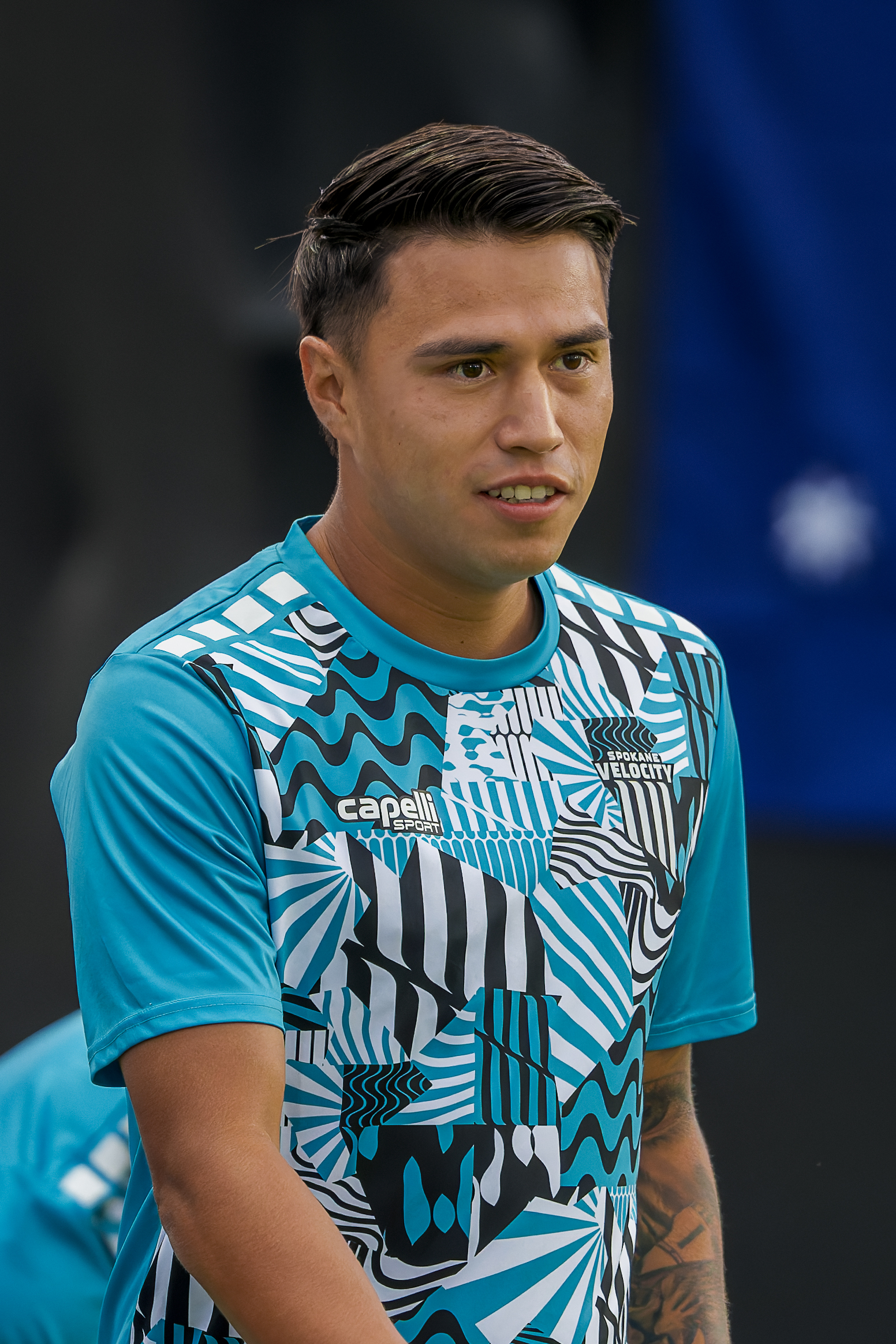
- Gallardo with Spokane Velocity in 2026

Personal information
- Full name: Joe Gallardo
- Date of birth: January 1, 1998 (age 28)
- Place of birth: San Diego, California, United States
- Height: 5 ft 10 in (1.78 m)
- Position: Forward

Team information
- Current team: Spokane Velocity
- Number: 7

Youth career
- 2012–2016: Monterrey
- 2016–2017: Orlando City

Senior career*
Years	Team	Apps	(Gls)
2017	Orlando City B	7	(0)
2018	SIMA Águilas	2	(0)
2019	Richmond Kickers	27	(7)
2020	Real Monarchs	1	(0)
2021–2022	Querétaro	14	(2)
2022	→ UAT (loan)	18	(0)
2023–2025	Union Omaha	66	(13)
2026–	Spokane Velocity	20	(2)

International career
2013–2015	United States U17	19	(14)
- * Club domestic league appearances and goals as of November 2, 2026

Joe Gallardo (born January 1, 1998) is an American professional soccer player who plays as a forward for Spokane Velocity in USL League One.

== Career ==
Gallardo was acquired by Orlando City B on January 25, 2017, after previously spending time with Monterrey's youth team. Gallardo was named to the USL League One All-League First Team.

Gallardo spent the 2019 season with Richmond Kickers where he led the club in goals. On December 5, 2019, Gallardo was transferred to USL Championship club Real Monarchs for an undisclosed transfer fee.

During the 2020 winter transfer window, Gallardo became a top target for multiple clubs in Mexico's top-flight. Eventually, Liga MX side Querétaro FC was able to secure the striker's signature on a multi-year contract. He made his debut during the Guardianes 2021 tournament.

Gallardo was loaned to Liga de Expansión MX side Correcaminos UAT for the 2022 season. On 14 February 2023, he signed with Union Omaha, thus returning to USL League One.

== Personal ==
Born in the United States, Gallardo is of Mexican descent which makes him eligible to play for Mexico.
