= Lagos Kunga =

American soccer player (born 1998)

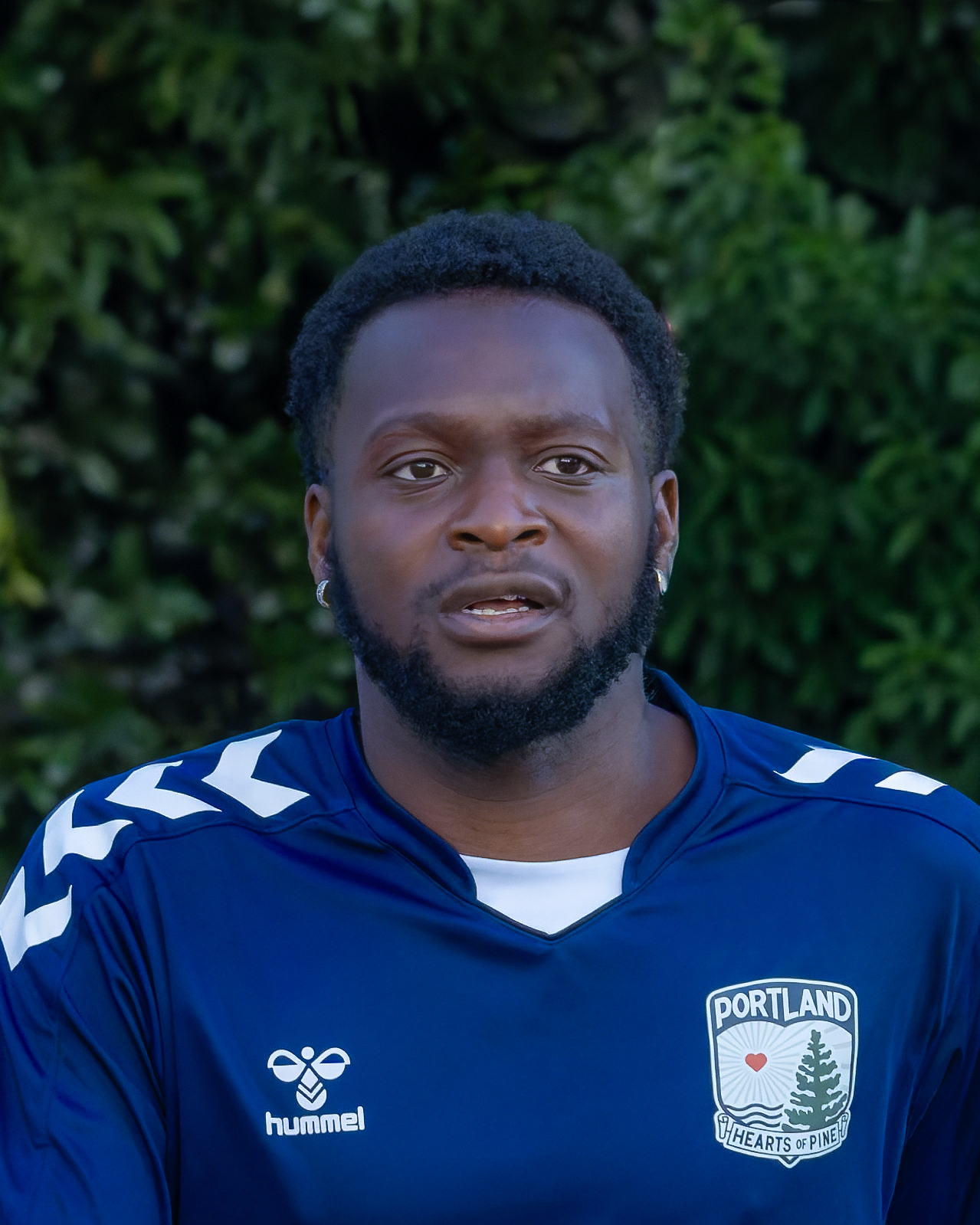
- Kunga with Portland in 2026

Personal information
- Date of birth: October 20, 1998 (age 28)
- Place of birth: Luanda, Angola
- Height: 1.73 m (5 ft 8 in)
- Position: Winger

Team information
- Current team: Portland Hearts of Pine
- Number: 70

Youth career
- 2008–2016: DDYSC Wolves
- 2016–2017: Atlanta United

Senior career*
Years	Team	Apps	(Gls)
2017	Charleston Battery	2	(0)
2017	→ Atlanta United (loan)	0	(0)
2018–2020	Atlanta United	0	(0)
2018–2019	→ Atlanta United 2 (loan)	33	(5)
2019	→ Memphis 901 (loan)	20	(1)
2020	→ Phoenix Rising (loan)	9	(1)
2021	Kalonji Pro-Profile	5	(2)
2021	Kristiansund	1	(0)
2022	Kalonji Pro-Profile		
2022–2023	Al Khums	6	(0)
2023	Des Moines Menace	13	(6)
2023–2025	Union Omaha	27	(5)
2026–	Portland Hearts of Pine	6	(0)

International career^{‡}
2017	United States U20	4	(1)
- * Club domestic league appearances and goals as of October 25, 2026 ‡ National team caps and goals as of June 28, 2017

Lagos Kunga (born October 20, 1998) is a professional soccer player who plays for Portland Hearts of Pine in USL League One. Born in Angola, he represented the United States at youth level.

== Early life ==
Kunga was born in Angola before his family moved to Russia, where they lived until he was seven years old. They later moved to Clarkston, Georgia in the United States.

== Professional career ==
At the youth level, Kunga developed at DDYSC in Atlanta and played varsity soccer at The Paideia School. Kunga had initially stated a commitment to play college soccer at Furman University.

=== Atlanta United ===
It was announced on June 17, 2017, that Kunga would sign with Major League Soccer side Atlanta United as a Homegrown Player at the beginning of the 2018 season.

On June 28, 2017, Kunga signed with United Soccer League side Charleston Battery, the USL affiliate of Atlanta United, until the end of their 2017 season. He was immediately sent on a short-term loan deal to Atlanta and made an appearance on the same day as a 65th-minute substitute in 3–2 loss to Miami FC in the U.S. Open Cup.

On March 24, 2018, Kunga made his first official appearance for Atlanta United on their second team, Atlanta United 2. Kunga started the game, and was subbed off after 86 minutes.

On the last day of the USL regular season, October 13, 2018, Kunga scored a brace against the Richmond Kickers in a 3–2 victory to finish off the season with five goals in 31 appearances.

Following the 2020 season, Kunga was released by Atlanta on November 24, 2020.

==== Memphis 901 (loan) ====
Kunga was loaned to Memphis 901 in the USL Championship. Kunga made 20 appearances scoring one goal.

==== Phoenix Rising (loan) ====
On January 21, 2020, Kunga was loaned to USL Championship club Phoenix Rising FC.

=== Kalonji Pro-Profile ===
After being released from Phoenix Rising FC following the 2020 USL Championship season, Kunga returned to Georgia to play with United Premier Soccer League club Kalonji Pro-Profile.

=== Kristiansund BK ===
On August 29, 2021, Kunga signed with Eliteserien club Kristiansund BK.

=== Kalonji Pro-Profile ===
Kunga returned to Kalonji Pro-Profile in 2022. He scored in Kalonji's United Premier Soccer League National Third Place match against the Los Angeles FC Academy.

=== Al Khums SC ===
In September 2022, Kunga signed Libyan Premier League side Al Khums SC.

=== Des Moines Menace ===
In May 2023, Kunga signed with USL2 side Des Moines Menace. Kunga scored six goals with Des Moines as the club made the League Two Central Conference Final.

=== Union Omaha ===
Kunga joined Union Omaha of USL League One on August 31, 2023. He made 27 appearances and scored five goals across two seasons with the club. He remained under contract but missed the 2025 USL League One season due to an anterior cruciate ligament injury.

=== Portland Hearts of Pine ===
Kunga joined USL League One side Portland Hearts of Pine on January 29, 2026.

== Statistics ==
As of June 22, 2020

Club	Season	League			Cup		League Cup		Other^{[A]}		Total	
Club	Season	Division	Apps	Goals	Apps	Goals	Apps	Goals	Apps	Goals	Apps	Goals
United States			League		US Open Cup		Playoffs		North America		Total	
Atlanta United	2017	Major League Soccer	0	0	1	0	—		—		1	0
Charleston Battery	2017	United Soccer League	2	0	0	0	—		—		2	0
Atlanta United 2	2018	United Soccer League	31	5	0	0	—		—		31	5
Atlanta United 2	2019	USL Championship	2	0	0	0	—		—		2	0
Memphis 901	2019	USL Championship	20	1	3	0	—		—		23	1
Phoenix Rising	2020	USL Championship	1	1	0	0	—		—		1	1
Total	United States		56	7	4	0	0	0	0	0	60	7
Career statistics			56	7	4	0	0	0	0	0	60	7
