= Marco Milanese (footballer) =

Italian footballer (born 1998)

Personal information
- Date of birth: 31 July 1998 (age 28)
- Place of birth: Isernia, Italy
- Height: 1.85 m (6 ft 1 in)
- Position: Defender

Team information
- Current team: Union Omaha
- Number: 5

Youth career
- –2014: Chievo
- 2014–2015: Parma
- 2015–2016: Torino
- 2016–2017: Napoli

College career
Years	Team	Apps	(Gls)
2018–2020	Akron Zips	45	(3)
2021–2022	UNC Greensboro Spartans	40	(3)

Senior career*
Years	Team	Apps	(Gls)
2017	Napoli	0	(0)
2017–2018	Città di Isernia San Leucio SSD		
2021	Long Island Rough Riders	0	(0)
2022	Ocean City Nor'easters	1	(0)
2023–	Union Omaha	67	(1)

International career
- Italy U15
- Italy U17
- * Club domestic league appearances and goals as of October 31, 2025

Marco Milanese (born 31 July 1998) is an Italian footballer who plays as a defender for Union Omaha in USL League One.

== Career ==
=== Early career ===
Milanese played with the youth teams at Chievo, Parma, Torino and Napoli, the latter of which he spent time with the first team squad, making the bench on four occasions in 2017. He also spent time with local amateur side Città di Isernia San Leucio SSD.

During his youth career, Milanese also played for the Italy under-15 and under-17 sides.

=== College & amateur ===
In 2018, Milanese opted to move to the United States to play college soccer at Akron University. In three seasons with the Zips, Milanese made 45 appearances, scoring three goals and tallying two assists. In 2021, he transferred to the University of North Carolina at Greensboro and went on to appear 40 times in two seasons with the Spartans, netting three goals.

While at college, Milanese also appeared in the USL League Two, spending time with the Long Island Rough Riders in 2021, and making a single appearance for the Ocean City Nor'easters in 2022.

=== Union Omaha ===
On 24 January 2023, Milanese signed with USL League One side Union Omaha ahead of their 2023 season.
