= 2023 Union Omaha season =

Union Omaha
2023 season
- Owner: Gary Green
- Head coach: Dominic Casciato
- Stadium: Werner Park
- USL League One: 1st
- USL1 Playoffs: Semi-finals
- U.S. Open Cup: Third Round
- Top goalscorer: League: Steevan Dos Santos (13); All: Steevan Dos Santos (14)
- Highest home attendance: 4,095
- Lowest home attendance: 1,665
- Average home league attendance: 3,030
- Biggest win: League/All: (OMA 4-0 TRM (10/7))
- Biggest defeat: League: 3 goals (twice); All: SLC 5–1 OMA (4/25, USOC)
Home colors	Away colors

The 2023 Union Omaha season was the fourth season in the soccer team's history, and their fourth season in the third division of American soccer, USL League One. It was the team's first season without head coach Jay Mims, after the club announced his resignation on December 16. He was replaced by Dominic Casciato, who was most recently an assistant coach at El Paso Locomotive of the USL Championship. Union Omaha played their home games at Werner Park, located in Papillion, Nebraska, United States.

== Transfers ==
=== Transfers in ===
Date	Position	Name	From	Fee/notes	Ref.
January 24, 2023	DF	(Italy) Luca Mastrantonio	(United States) FC Tucson	Free	
January 24, 2023	DF	(Italy) Marco Milanese	(United States) UNC Greensboro	Free	
January 31, 2023	DF	(Colombia) Junior Palacios	(United States) Miami FC	Free	
January 31, 2023	DF	(United States) Stefan Mueller	(United States) Rio Grande Valley FC	Free	
February 7, 2023	FW	(Cape Verde) Steevan Dos Santos	(United States) Tampa Bay Rowdies	Free	
February 14, 2023	FW	(United States) Joe Gallardo	(Mexico) Querétaro F.C.	Free	
February 14, 2023	DF	(Comoros) Alexis Souahy	(United States) New Mexico United	Free	
March 7, 2023	FW	(United States) Alex Steinwascher	(United States) Xavier Musketeers	Free	
March 14, 2023	MF	(Brazil) Pedro Dolabella	(United States) Rochester New York FC	Free	
March 14, 2023	GK	(United States) Ian McGrane	(United States) St. Louis City 2	Free	
August 31, 2023	MF	(United States) Lagos Kunga	(United States) Des Moines Menace	Free	
September 19, 2023	DF	(United States) Ethan Dudley	(United States) Crown Legacy FC	Free	

=== Loan In ===
No.	Pos.	Player	Loaned from	Start	End	Source
	DF	(United States) Sebastian Sanchez	(United States) Louisville City FC	February 7, 2023	December 31, 2023	

=== Transfers out ===
Date	Position	No.	Name	To	Fee/notes	Ref.
January 12, 2023	DF	27	(United States) Ryen Jiba	(United States) Minnesota United FC	$50,000	
January 18, 2023	FW	16	(England) Alex Bruce	(Vietnam) Hồ Chí Minh City	Free	
January 26, 2023	DF	5	(United States) Gabriel Claudio	(United States) One Knoxville SC	Free	
March 31, 2023	DF	13	(United States) Daltyn Knutson	(United States) Tormenta FC	Free	

== Roster ==
Union Omaha announced their initial list of returning players on December 7, 2022.

As of September 19, 2023

No.	Pos.	Nation	Player
2	DF	USA	Ethan Dudley
3	DF	USA	Stefan Mueller
4	DF	ITA	Luca Mastrantonio
5	DF	ITA	Marco Milanese
6	MF	JAM	Chavany Willis
7	FW	USA	Noe Meza
8	MF	USA	Joe Brito
9	MF	BRA	Pedro Dolabella
10	FW	CPV	Steevan Dos Santos
11	FW	USA	Joe Gallardo
12	MF	USA	Eddie Gordon
13	DF	USA	Anderson Holt
14	DF	USA	Sebastian Sanchez (on loan from Louisville City)
17	MF	USA	JP Scearce
20	MF	USA	Luis Gil
22	MF	USA	Conor Doyle
24	GK	GHA	Rashid Nuhu
25	GK	USA	Ian McGrane
26	MF	USA	Dion Acoff
28	DF	USA	Shaft Brewer Jr.
30	MF	USA	Yoskar Galván-Mercado
44	FW	USA	Alex Steinwascher
70	MF	USA	Lagos Kunga
95	DF	COM	Alexis Souahy

USL Academy Contract

== Competitions ==
=== Exhibitions ===
February 18, 2023 Preseason 1	Sporting Kansas City II	2–3	Union Omaha	Kansas City, MO
2:00 PM CST		Report		Stadium: Swope Park Stadium

February 25, 2023 Preseason 2	Tulsa Golden Hurricane	1–1	Union Omaha	Tulsa, OK
2:00 PM CST	2' (pen.)	Report	Mueller 34'	Stadium: Hurricane Soccer & Track Stadium
Note: Sixty minutes

February 25, 2023 Preseason 3	FC Tulsa	0–2	Union Omaha	Tulsa, OK
12:30 AM CST		Report	Meza 9'; Gil 54'	Stadium: Hurricane Soccer & Track Stadium
Note: Sixty minutes

March 3, 2023 Preseason 4	Creighton Bluejays	0-1	Union Omaha	Omaha, NE
TBA			Meza	Stadium: Morrison Stadium
Note: Sixty minutes

March 3, 2023 Preseason 5	Iowa Western Reviers	0–0	Union Omaha	Omaha, NE
TBA				Stadium: Morrison Stadium
Note: Sixty minutes

March 11, 2023 Preseason 6	Omaha Mavericks	–	Union Omaha	Omaha, NE
				Stadium: Caniglia Field
Note: Abandoned due to weather

March 11, 2023 Preseason 7	Iowa Western Reviers	–	Union Omaha	Omaha, NE
TBA				Stadium: Caniglia Field
Note: Abandoned due to weather

March 16, 2023 Preseason 8	Bellevue Bruins	—	Union Omaha	TBA
TBA				Stadium: TBA
Note: Abandoned due to weather

March 18, 2023 Preseason 9	St. Louis City SC 2	—	Union Omaha	St. Louis, MO
TBA				Stadium: Washington University Orthopedics High Performance Center
Note: Abandoned due to weather

=== USL League One ===
==== Standings ====
Pos	Team	Pld	W	L	T	GF	GA	GD	Pts	Qualification
1	Union Omaha (S)	32	19	5	8	61	41	+20	65	Qualification for the semi-finals
2	North Carolina FC (C)	32	19	7	6	58	39	+19	63	Qualification for the semi-finals
3	Northern Colorado Hailstorm FC	32	18	6	8	59	37	+22	62	Qualification for the play-offs
4	Charlotte Independence	32	13	9	10	50	42	+8	49	Qualification for the play-offs
5	Greenville Triumph SC	32	13	10	9	45	40	+5	48	Qualification for the play-offs

Source: USL League One
Rules for classification: 1) points; 2) total wins; 3) total goal differential; 4) total goals scored; 5) points earned against top four Conference finishers; 6) disciplinary points; 7) drawing of lots.
(C) Champions; (S) Players' Shield winner

==== Results summary ====
Overall								Home						Away					
Pld	W	D	L	GF	GA	GD	Pts	W	D	L	GF	GA	GD	W	D	L	GF	GA	GD
32	19	8	5	61	41	+20	65	11	3	2	38	22	+16	8	5	3	23	19	+4

Source: USL League One

==== Results by round ====
Round	1	2	3	4	5	6	7	8	9	10	11	12	13	14	15	16	17	18	19	20	21	22	23	24	25	26	27	28	29	30	31	32
Stadium	H	A	H	A	H	A	A	H	H	A	A	H	H	A	H	A	A	A	H	H	H	A	H	A	H	H	A	H	A	H	A	A
Result	D	W	L	D	W	D	D	D	L	L	D	D	W	W	W	L	W	L	W	W	W	W	W	W	W	W	W	W	D	W	W	W
Position	6	4	7	6	4	5	9	8	9	9	9	10	8	8	7	7	6	6	6	4	3	2	2	3	3	2	2	2	3	1	1	1

Source: USL League One
A = Away; H = Home; W = Win; D = Draw; L = Loss

==== Match results ====
March 26, 2023 1	Union Omaha	1–1	Forward Madison	Omaha, Nebraska
2:00 pm CT	Scearce 20'; Acoff (yellow card) 40'; Palacios (yellow card) 63'; Brewer (yellow card) 89'	Report	Chaney 55'; Wheeler-Omiunu (yellow card) 77'; Osmond (yellow card) 82'	Stadium: Caniglia Field; Attendance: 1,913; Referee: Nabil Bensalah

April 1, 2023	One Knoxville SC	P–P	Union Omaha	Knoxville, Tennessee
				Stadium: Regal Stadium; Referee: Benjamin Meyer
Note: Match postponed due to travel delays. Rescheduled date July 18

April 8, 2023 2	Fuego FC	0–2	Union Omaha	Fresno, California
9:00 pm CDT	Partida (yellow card) 37'; Chavez (yellow card) 60'	Report	Brito (yellow card) 18'; Brewer Jr. (yellow card) 41'; Meza 45'; Doyle (yellow card) 55'; Dolabella (yellow card) 75'; Dos Santos 88'; Nuhu (yellow card) 90'; Souahy (yellow card) 90+3'	Stadium: Fresno State Soccer Stadium; Attendance: 570; Referee: Alexis Da Silva

April 15, 2023 3	Union Omaha	1–2	North Carolina FC	Omaha, Nebraska
2:00 pm CDT	Doyle (yellow card) 17'; Brewer Jr. (yellow card) 46'; Souahy (yellow card) 73'; Palacios (yellow card) 78'; Gallardo 84'	Report	Mentzingen 3' (pen.); Young (yellow card) 5'; Maldondo (yellow card) 14'; Navarro (yellow card) 25'; Servania (yellow card) 31'; Perez 43'; Popp (yellow card) 71'	Stadium: Caniglia Field; Attendance: 1,665; Referee: Jervis Atagana

April 19, 2023 4	Charlotte Independence	0–0	Union Omaha	Charlotte, North Carolina
6:00 pm CDT	Mbuyu (yellow card) 21'; Obertan (yellow card) 39'	Report	Gallardo (yellow card) 43'	Stadium: American Legion Memorial Stadium; Attendance: 467; Referee: Katherine McCormick

April 29, 2023 5	Union Omaha	3–2	Hailstorm FC	Papillion, Nebraska
7:00 CDT	Palacios 35', (yellow card) 49'; Meza 45+3', 56', (yellow card) 68'; Milanese (yellow card) 67'	Report	Lukic (yellow card) 8' (yellow-red card) 15'; Kwakwa (yellow card) 15'; Amann 60', 81'; Hernández (yellow card) 86'; Rosas (yellow card) 90+2'	Stadium: Werner Park; Attendance: 2,560; Referee: DeShaun Beard

May 5, 2023 6	Richmond Kickers	0–0	Union Omaha	Richmond, Virginia
6:00 CDT		Report	Dos Santos (yellow card) 67'	Stadium: City Stadium; Attendance: 5,418; Referee: John Matto

May 20, 2023 7	Chattanooga Red Wolves	3–3	Union Omaha	East Ridge, Tennessee
6:30 CDT	Cardona (yellow card) 22'; Marsh 53'; Mensah 73'; Tejera 90+3'	Report	Dolabella 22'; Steinwascher 66'; Gallardo 74' (yellow card) 74'; Nuhu (yellow card) 77'	Stadium: CHI Memorial Stadium; Referee: Melinda Sopka

May 24, 2023 8	Union Omaha	3–3	Greenville Triumph	Papillion, Nebraska
7:00 CDT	Dolabella 18'; Souahy (yellow card) 21'; Milanese (yellow card) 26'; Meza 53', 70'; Nuhu (yellow card) 73'	Report	Wu (yellow card) 6'; Castro 24'; Boyce (yellow card) 44', (goal) 74' (pen.); MacKinnon (yellow card) 54'; Labovitz 76'	Stadium: Werner Park; Attendance: 2,533; Referee: Gloria Martinez

May 27, 2023 9	Union Omaha	1–2	Forward Madison	Papillion, Nebraska
7:00 CDT	Brito (yellow card) 6'; Brewer Jr. 21'; Willis (yellow card) 78'; Dos Santos (yellow card) 90+5'	Report	Cichero (yellow card) 10'; Mesias 14', (yellow card) 33'; Bartman (yellow card) 39'; Chaney 53'; Schipmann (yellow card) 56'	Stadium: Werner Park; Attendance: 2,886; Referee: Gabriele Ciampi

June 3, 2023 10	Charlotte Independence	3–0	Union Omaha	Charlotte, North Carolina
4:00 CDT	Johnson 7'; Mbuyu 55'; Bennett 90'	Report		Stadium: American Legion Memorial Stadium; Attendance: 2,562; Referee: Cristian Campo Hernández

June 10, 2023 11	Greenville Triumph	1–1	Union Omaha	Greenville, South Carolina
6:00 CDT	Castro (yellow card) 41'; MacKinnon 45+2', (yellow card) 62'	Report	Meza 8'; Brewer Jr. (yellow card) 45+1'; Gordon (yellow card) 90+7'	Stadium: Paladin Stadium; Attendance: 2,164; Referee: Alejo Calume

June 21, 2023 12	Union Omaha	1–1	One Knoxville	Papillion, Nebraska
7:00 CDT	Meza 47'; Milanese (yellow card) 64'; Souahy (yellow card) 90+1'; Steinwascher (yellow card) 90+7'; Willis (yellow card) 90+8'	Report	Ross (yellow card) 41'; Waldeck (yellow card) 83'; Ilić 90+2' (pen.); Thomas (yellow card) 90+5'	Stadium: Werner Park; Attendance: 2,602; Referee: Fevzi Demirhan

June 24, 2023 13	Union Omaha	2–0	South Georgia Tormenta	Papillion, Nebraska
7:00 CDT	Scearce 42' (yellow card) 60'; Nembhard 45+5' (o.g.); Doyle (yellow card) 75'; Milanese (yellow card) 82'; Dos Santos (red card) 90+6'	Report	Akoto (yellow card) 45+4'; Heckenberg (yellow card) 65'; Dengler (yellow card) 67'	Stadium: Werner Park; Attendance: 3,082; Referee: Servando Berna Rico

July 1, 2023 14	Fuego FC	0–1	Union Omaha	Fresno, California
7:00 PDT	Falck (yellow card) 24'; Partida (yellow card) 42'; Partida (yellow card) 37'; Cromwell (yellow card) 56'; Dulysse (yellow card) 69'; Cerritos (yellow card) 87'	Report	Meza 32'; Gallardo (yellow card) 56'; Milanese (yellow card) 90+4'	Stadium: Fresno State Soccer Stadium; Attendance: N/A; Referee: Adam Rice
Note: The report didn't say attendance

July 8, 2023 15	Union Omaha	4–1	Richmond Kickers	Papillion, Nebraska
7:00 pm CDT	Scearce 24'; Meza (yellow card) 31'; Gallardo (red card) 41'; Meza 49'; Dos Santos 68', 79'; Willis (red card) 71'	Report	Vinyals (yellow card) 26'; Terzaghi 39' (pen.), (yellow card) 4q' Sukow (yellow card) 66'; Morán Correa (yellow card) 73'; Aune (yellow card) 86'	Stadium: Werner Park; Attendance: 3,524; Referee: Kevin Fikar

July 15, 2023 16	Hailstorm FC	2–0	Union Omaha	Windsor, Colorado
7:00 pm MDT	Amann 39', 73'; Kwakwa (yellow card) 50' (yellow-red card) 78'; Nortey (yellow card) 59'; Rogers (yellow card) 66'; Norman (yellow card) 86'	Report	Brito (yellow card) 11'; Mastrantonio (yellow card) 90+5'	Stadium: Future Legends Complex; Attendance: 809; Referee: Servando Berna Rico

July 18, 2023 17	One Knoxville SC	1–2	Union Omaha	Knoxville, Tennessee
5:30 pm EDT	Fernandez 10', (yellow card) 89'; Crisler (yellow card) 37'; Skelton (yellow card) 45+1'; Claudio (yellow card) 69'	Report	Palacios (yellow card) 9', (goal) 15'; Mastrantonio (red card) 82'; Acoff 90+4'	Stadium: Regal Stadium; Attendance: N/A; Referee: Joe Surgan
Note: Match originally scheduled for April 1, the report didn't say attendance

July 22, 2023 18	Lexington SC	3–0	Union Omaha	Georgetown, Kentucky
7:00 pm EDT	Brown 10'; Mohammed (yellow card) 26'; Fox (yellow card) 36'; Ates Diouf 41'; Knight (yellow card) 53'; Machell (yellow card) 70'; Ceja (yellow card) 75'; Balogun 81'	Report	Willis (yellow card) 38'; Dolabella (yellow card) 78'	Stadium: Toyota Stadium; Attendance: 2,178; Referee: Benjamin Mayer

July 29, 2023 19	Union Omaha	3–2	South Georgia Tormenta	Papillion, Nebraska
7:00 pm CDT	Mastrantonio (yellow card) 26'; Scearce 35' (pen.) (yellow card) 63'; Dos Santos 50'; Souahy 90+2'	Report	Heckenberg (yellow card) 29'; Nembhard (yellow card) 30'; Murphy (yellow card) 41'; Akoto 56' (yellow card) 58'; Akale 77'; Mason (yellow card) 77'	Stadium: Werner Park; Attendance: 3,573; Referee: Esad Omanovic

August 2, 2023 20	Union Omaha	2–0	Lexington SC	Papillion, Nebraska
7:00 pm CDT	Dos Santos 24'; Brito (yellow card) 38'; Scearce 52' (yellow card) 73'	Report	Ceja (yellow card) 9'; Dious (yellow card) 36'; Smart (yellow card) 45'; Robertson (yellow card) 90+4'	Stadium: Werner Park; Attendance: 3,524; Referee: Gloria Martinez

August 5, 2023 21	Union Omaha	3–1	One Knoxville	Papillion, Nebraska
7:00 pm CDT	Brito 26'; Dolabella (yellow card) 37'; Milanese (yellow card) 38'; Doyle 59'; Willis 90+7'	Report	Kelly-Rosales (yellow card) 44' (yellow-red card) 46'; Skelton (yellow card) 45+1'; Fletcher (yellow card) 85'; Vowinkel (yellow card) 90+6'; Johnson 90+9'	Stadium: Werner Park; Attendance: 4,095; Referee: Dion Coxe-Trieger

August 12, 2023 22	Hailstorm FC	2–3	Union Omaha	Windsor, Colorado
7:00 pm MDT	Opara 38', 87'; Cornwall (yellow card) 43'; Zayed (yellow card) 90+5'	Report	Gallardo 36' (pen.); Scearce 44' (pen.), (yellow card) 75'; Dolabella 80'; Brewer Jr. (yellow card) 82'	Stadium: Future Legends Complex; Attendance: 1,446; Referee: Donovan Eubank

August 19, 2023 23	Union Omaha	2–1	Chattanooga Red Wolves	Papillion, Nebraska
7:00 pm CT	Gallardo (yellow card) 9'; Steinwascher 10'; Lombardi 66' (o.g.)	Report	Filipe (yellow card) 82'; Marsh 90+8'	Stadium: Werner Park; Attendance: 3,356; Referee: Richonne Clark

August 26, 2023 24	Greenville Triumph	1–2	Union Omaha	Greenville, South Carolina
7:00 pm EDT	Shultz (yellow card) 47'; Shaw (yellow card) 66'; Labovitz (yellow card) 78', (goal) 90+1'	Report	Doyle (yellow card) 1'; Brito (yellow card) 5', (goal) 31'; McGrane (yellow card) 53'; Dos Santos 62'; Gallardo (yellow card) 69'; Willis (yellow card) 90+7'	Stadium: Paladin Stadium; Attendance: 1,735; Referee: Aleksandar Zhelyazkov

September 6, 2023 25	Union Omaha	4–3	North Carolina FC	Papillion, Nebraska
7:00 pm CDT	Dolabella 9', (yellow card) 70'; Scearce (yellow card) 19'; Brito 45+2'; Brewer Jr. (yellow card) 54'; Dos Santos 59', (yellow card) 83'; Meza 75'	Report	McLaughlin 11'; Maldonado (yellow card) 12'; Fernandes (yellow card) 15'; Arriaga (yellow card) 49'; Benton (yellow card) 69'; Mentzingen 85'; Croll (yellow card) 90+3'; Popp 90+4'	Stadium: Werner Park; Attendance: 2,684; Referee: Joe Surgan

September 9, 2023 26	Union Omaha	2–1	Richmond Kickers	Papillion, Nebraska
7:00 pm CDT	Dos Santos (yellow card) 21'; Dolabella 58', (yellow card) 90+4'; Gil 82'	Report	Morán Correa (yellow card) 40'; Silva (yellow card) 45+3'; Brewer 90+2' (o.g.)	Stadium: Werner Park; Attendance: 4,046; Referee: Velimir Stefanovic

September 16, 2023 27	Chattanooga Red Wolves	2–3	Union Omaha	East Ridge, Tennessee
6:30 CDT	Kraft 39', (yellow card) 45+4'; Madrid (red card) 58'; Hernández (yellow card) 78'; Mensah 90+1'	Report	Dos Santos 18'; Milanese 34', (yellow card) 38'; Dolabella (yellow card) 45+1'; Brito 45+2'; Scearce (yellow card) 56'	Stadium: CHI Memorial Stadium; Attendance: 2,123; Referee: Campo Hernández

September 23, 2023 28	Union Omaha	2–1	Fuego FC	Papillion, Nebraska
7:00 pm CDT	Gil (yellow card) 34'; Meza 77'; Acoff (yellow card) 81'; Gallardo 90+3'	Report	Forbes (yellow card) 27'; García (yellow card) 37'; Vasquez 56'; Cerritos (yellow card) 72'	Stadium: Werner Park; Attendance: 3,442; Referee: Madzid Coric

September 29, 2023 29	North Carolina FC	1–1	Union Omaha	Cary, North Carolina
7:00 pm ET	Mentzingen 12'; Garcia (yellow card) 25'	Report	Gil 40'; Meza (yellow card) 76'	Stadium: WakeMed Soccer Park; Attendance: 3,664; Referee: Gary Gutierrez

October 4, 2023 30	Union Omaha	4–1	Charlotte Independence	Papillion, Nebraska
6:30 pm CDT	Joe Gallardo (soccer) 20'; Brewer (yellow card) 61'; Dos Santos 66', 90' (pen.), 90+5'; Scearce (yellow card) 82'; Acoff (yellow card) 83'	Report	Mbuyu 21'; Dunwell (yellow card) 72'; Acosta (yellow card) 90'	Stadium: Werner Park; Attendance: 3,002; Referee: Olvin Oliva

October 7, 2023 31	South Georgia Tormenta	0–4	Union Omaha	Statesboro, Georgia
7:30 ET	Knutson (red card) 39'; Heckenburg (yellow card) 73'	Report	Dos Santos 13'; Dolabella (yellow card) 29'; Meza 60'; Kunga 61'; Brito 81'	Stadium: Optim Sports Medicine Field; Attendance: 1,368; Referee: Alejo Calume

October 14, 2023 32	Forward Madison	0–1	Union Omaha	Madison, Wisconsin
6:00 CDT	Wheeler (yellow card) 44'; Chaney (yellow card) 75'; Brotherton (yellow card) 88'; Da Silva (yellow card) 90+1'	Report	Kunga (yellow card) 35'; Scearce (yellow card) 41'; Dos Santos 64'; Joe Gallardo (soccer) (yellow card) 90+3'; Nuhu (yellow card) 90+9'	Stadium: Breese Stevens Field; Attendance: 4,740; Referee: Velimir Stefanovic

==== USL League One playoffs ====
October 28, 2023 Semi-finals	Union Omaha	0–0 (a.e.t.) (4–5 p)	Charlotte Independence	Papillion, Nebraska
4:30 PM CDT	Scearce (yellow card) 30'; Gallardo (yellow card) 90'; Souahy (yellow card) 102'	Report	Spielman (yellow card) 21'; Obertan (yellow card) 90'; Dunwell (yellow card) 104'	Stadium: Werner Park; Attendance: 2,217; Referee: Eric Tattersall
	Penalties
	Scearce (penalty scored); Dos Santos (penalty missed); Gallardo (penalty scored); Brito (penalty scored); Willis (penalty scored)		(penalty scored) Johnson; (penalty scored) Acosta; (penalty scored) Bennett; (penalty scored) Álvarez; (penalty scored) Spielman

=== U.S.Open Cup ===
April 5, 2023 Second Round	(Nebraska) Union Omaha	2–0	(Texas) El Paso Locomotive FC	Omaha, Nebraska
7:00pm CDT	Gallardo (yellow card) 11'; Palacios 58'; Dos Santos 75'; Mueller (yellow card) 87'	Report	Gómez (yellow card) 22'; Herrera (yellow card) 49'; Zacarías (yellow card) 72'; Borelli (yellow card) 84'	Stadium: Morrison Stadium; Referee: Velimir Stefanovic

April 25, 2023 Third Round	(Missouri) St. Louis City SC	5–1	(Nebraska) Union Omaha	St. Louis, Missouri
7:00 PM CDT	Jackson 3', 66'; Gallardo 48' (o.g.); Watts 62'; Löwen 86'	Report	Palacios (yellow card) 25'; Dolabella 79'	Stadium: Citypark; Attendance: 22,435; Referee: Lorenzo Hernandez

== Statistics ==
=== Appearances and goals ===
Numbers after plus–sign (+) denote appearances as a substitute.

No.	Pos	Nat	Player	Total		USL-1		U.S. Open Cup	
No.	Pos	Nat	Player	Apps	Goals	Apps	Goals	Apps	Goals
3	DF	(United States) USA	Stefan Mueller	5	0	2+2	0	1+0	0
4	DF	(Italy) ITA	Luca Mastrantonio	20	0	16+4	0	0+0	0
5	DF	(Italy) ITA	Marco Milanese	28	1	26+1	1	0+1	0
6	MF	(Jamaica) JAM	Chavany Willis	18	1	1+15	1	0+2	0
7	FW	(United States) USA	Noe Meza	30	12	22+6	12	2+0	0
8	MF	(United States) USA	Joe Brito	34	5	25+7	5	0+2	0
9	MF	(Brazil) BRA	Pedro Dolabella	32	6	22+8	5	0+2	1
10	FW	(Cape Verde) CPV	Steevan Dos Santos	31	14	22+7	13	2+0	1
11	MF	(United States) USA	Joe Gallardo	30	5	17+11	5	2+0	0
12	MF	(United States) USA	Eddie Gordon	5	0	0+5	0	0+0	0
13	DF	(United States) USA	Anderson Holt	6	0	0+6	0	0+0	0
14	DF	(United States) USA	Sebastian Sanchez	0	0	0+0	0	0+0	0
17	MF	(United States) USA	JP Scearce	33	6	31+0	6	2+0	0
18	DF	(Colombia) COL	Junior Palacios	15	3	9+4	2	2+0	1
20	MF	(United States) USA	Luis Gil	34	2	25+7	2	2+0	0
22	MF	(United States) USA	Conor Doyle	30	1	26+2	1	2+0	0
24	GK	(Ghana) GHA	Rashid Nuhu	29	0	27+0	0	2+0	0
25	GK	(United States) USA	Ian McGrane	5	0	5+0	0	0+0	0
26	MF	(United States) USA	Dion Acoff	25	1	18+6	1	1+0	0
28	MF	(United States) USA	Shaft Brewer Jr.	31	1	22+7	1	2+0	0
30	MF	(United States) USA	Yoskar Galvan-Mercado	1	0	0+1	0	0+0	0
44	FW	(United States) USA	Alex Steinwascher	24	2	2+20	2	0+2	0
70	MF	(United States) USA	Lagos Kunga	7	1	2+5	1	0+0	0
95	DF	(Comoros) COM	Alexis Souahy	34	1	32+0	1	2+0	0

- Last updated: October 17, 2023
- Source: USL League One

=== Disciplinary record ===
No.	Pos.	Player	USL1			US Open Cup			Total		
No.	Pos.	Player	Booked	(yellow card) (yellow-red card)	Sent off (straight red)	Booked	(yellow card) (yellow-red card)	Sent off (straight red)	Booked	(yellow card) (yellow-red card)	Sent off (straight red)
3	DF	(United States) Stefan Mueller	0	0	0	1	0	0	1	0	0
4	DF	(Italy) Luca Mastrantonio	2	0	1	0	0	0	2	0	1
5	DF	(Italy) Marco Milanese	7	0	0	0	0	0	7	0	0
6	MF	(Jamaica) Chavany Willis	4	0	1	0	0	0	4	0	1
7	FW	(United States) Noe Meza	3	0	0	0	0	0	3	0	0
8	MF	(United States) Joe Brito	5	0	0	0	0	0	5	0	0
9	MF	(Brazil) Pedro Dolabella	7	0	0	0	0	0	7	0	0
10	FW	(Cape Verde) Steevan Dos Santos	4	0	1	0	0	0	4	0	1
11	MF	(United States) Joe Gallardo	6	0	1	1	0	0	7	0	1
12	MF	(United States) Eddie Gordon	1	0	0	0	0	0	1	0	0
14	DF	(United States) Sebastian Sanchez	0	0	0	0	0	0	0	0	0
17	MF	(United States) JP Scearce	8	0	0	0	0	0	8	0	0
18	DF	(Colombia) Junior Palacios	4	0	0	1	0	0	5	0	0
20	MF	(United States) Luis Gil	1	0	0	0	0	0	1	0	0
22	MF	(United States) Conor Doyle	4	0	0	0	0	0	4	0	0
24	GK	(Ghana) Rashid Nuhu	4	0	0	0	0	0	4	0	0
25	GK	(United States) Ian McGrane	1	0	0	0	0	0	1	0	0
26	MF	(United States) Dion Acoff	3	0	0	0	0	0	3	0	0
28	DF	(United States) Shaft Brewer Jr.	7	0	0	0	0	0	7	0	0
30	MF	(United States) Yoskar Galvan-Mercado	0	0	0	0	0	0	0	0	0
44	FW	(United States) Alex Steinwascher	1	0	0	0	0	0	1	0	0
70	MF	(United States) Lagos Kunga	1	0	0	0	0	0	1	0	0
95	DF	(Comoros) Alexis Souahy	5	0	0	0	0	0	5	0	0
Total			78	0	4	3	0	0	81	0	4

- Last updated: October 17, 2023
- Source: USL League One

== Awards and honors ==
=== Coach of the Year ===
Name	Ref
(England) Dominic Casciato	

=== All League Teams ===
Team	Player	Position	Ref
First Team	(United States) JP Scearce	MF	
First Team	(Comoros) Alexis Souahy	DF	
Second Team	(Cape Verde) Steevan Dos Santos	FW	
Second Team	(United States) Noe Meza	FW	
Second Team	(United States) Dion Acoff	DF	

=== Player of the Week ===
Week	Player	Opponent	Position	Ref
7	(United States) Noe Meza	Northern Colorado Hailstorm FC	FW	
11	(United States) Noe Meza (2)	Greenville Triumph SC	FW	
26	(Brazil) Pedro Dolabella	North Carolina FC/ Richmond Kickers	MF	
30	(Cape Verde) Steevan Dos Santos	Charlotte Independence/ South Georgia Tormenta	FW	

=== Team of the Week ===
Week	Player	Opponent	Position	Ref
2	(United States) JP Scearce	Forward Madison FC	MF	
2	(Ghana) Rashid Nuhu	Forward Madison FC	Bench	
2	(United States) Luis Gil	Forward Madison FC	Bench	
4	(Comoros) Alexis Souahy	Central Valley Fuego FC	DF	
4	(United States) Noe Meza	Central Valley Fuego FC	FW	
4	(Ghana) Rashid Nuhu (2)	Central Valley Fuego FC	Bench	
4	(United States) Luis Gil (2)	Central Valley Fuego FC	Bench	
4	(Cape Verde) Steevan Dos Santos	Central Valley Fuego FC	Bench	
5	(United States) Joe Gallardo	North Carolina FC	FW	
5	(Colombia) Junior Palacios	North Carolina FC	Bench	
6	(Comoros) Alexis Souahy (2)	Charlotte Independence	DF	
7	(United States) Noe Meza (2)	Northern Colorado Hailstorm FC	FW	
7	(United States) Luis Gil (3)	Northern Colorado Hailstorm FC	Bench	
8	(Ghana) Rashid Nuhu (3)	Richmond Kickers	Bench	
8	(Italy) Luca Mastrantonio	Richmond Kickers	Bench	
10	(United States) Luis Gil (4)	Chattanooga Red Wolves SC	Bench	
11	(United States) Noe Meza (3)	Greenville Triumph SC	FW	
11	(United States) Luis Gil (4)	Greenville Triumph SC	MF	
11	(United States) Shaft Brewer Jr.	Greenville Triumph SC	Bench	
11	(Brazil) Pedro Dolabella	Greenville Triumph SC	Bench	
13	(United States) Noe Meza (4)	Greenville Triumph SC	Bench	
15	(Ghana) Rashid Nuhu (4)	Tormenta FC	GK	
15	(Italy) Marco Milanese	Tormenta FC	MF	
15	(United States) JP Scearce (2)	Tormenta FC	Bench	
16	(United States) Noe Meza (5)	Central Valley Fuego FC	FW	
16	(United States) JP Scearce (3)	Central Valley Fuego FC	Bench	
17	(Ghana) Rashid Nuhu (5)	Richmond Kickers	GK	
17	(United States) Dion Acoff	Richmond Kickers	MF	
17	(United States) JP Scearce (4)	Richmond Kickers	MF	
17	(Cape Verde) Steevan Dos Santos (2)	Richmond Kickers	FW	
17	(United States) Joe Brito	Richmond Kickers	Bench	
20	(Cape Verde) Steevan Dos Santos (3)	Tormenta FC	FW	
21	(United States) Shaft Brewer Jr.	Lexington SC/ One Knoxville SC	DF	
21	(Italy) Luca Mastrantonio (2)	Lexington SC/ One Knoxville SC	DF	
21	(United States) Conor Doyle	Lexington SC/ One Knoxville SC	MF	
21	(United States) JP Scearce (5)	Lexington SC/ One Knoxville SC	MF	
24	(United States) Ian McGrane	Greenville Triumph SC	Bench	
26	(Brazil) Pedro Dolabella (2)	North Carolina FC/ Richmond Kickers	MF	
26	(United States) Luis Gil (5)	North Carolina FC/ Richmond Kickers	MF	
26	(Comoros) Alexis Souahy (3)	North Carolina FC/ Richmond Kickers	Bench	
26	(United States) Joe Brito (2)	North Carolina FC/ Richmond Kickers	Bench	
26	(United States) Noe Meza (6)	North Carolina FC/ Richmond Kickers	Bench	
27	(Italy) Marco Milanese (2)	Chattanooga Red Wolves SC	MF	
27	(Cape Verde) Steevan Dos Santos (4)	Chattanooga Red Wolves SC	FW	
27	(United States) Joe Brito (3)	Chattanooga Red Wolves SC	Bench	
28	(United States) Dion Acoff (2)	Central Valley Fuego FC	MF	
28	(United States) Noe Meza (7)	Central Valley Fuego FC	Bench	
29	(Italy) Marco Milanese (3)	North Carolina FC	Bench	
29	(United States) Luis Gil (6)	North Carolina FC	Bench	
30	(United States) Dion Acoff (3)	Charlotte Independence/ South Georgia Tormenta	MF	
30	(Italy) Marco Milanese (4)	Charlotte Independence/ South Georgia Tormenta	DF	
30	(United States) Luis Gil (7)	Charlotte Independence/ South Georgia Tormenta	MF	
30	(United States) Lagos Kunga	Charlotte Independence/ South Georgia Tormenta	MF	
30	(Cape Verde) Steevan Dos Santos (5)	Charlotte Independence/ South Georgia Tormenta	FW	
30	(United States) JP Scearce (6)	Charlotte Independence/ South Georgia Tormenta	Bench	
