= Stefan Mueller (soccer, born 1995) =

American soccer player

Personal information
- Date of birth: October 13, 1995 (age 31)
- Place of birth: East Northport, New York, United States
- Height: 1.85 m (6 ft 1 in)
- Position: Full-back

Youth career
- 2010–2013: BW Gottschee

College career
Years	Team	Apps	(Gls)
2013–2016	Temple Owls	70	(1)

Senior career*
Years	Team	Apps	(Gls)
2017	TB Uphusen		
2018	Long Island Rough Riders	2	(0)
2018–2019	Southport	4	(0)
2020–2022	South Georgia Tormenta	34	(4)
2022	Rio Grande Valley FC	9	(0)
2023	Union Omaha	4	(0)
- * Club domestic league appearances and goals as of October 18, 2023

Stefan Mueller (born October 13, 1995) is an American professional soccer player.

== Career ==
=== College ===
Mueller attended Temple University, playing all four years for their varsity soccer team. Throughout his four years at the college, Mueller registered 70 appearances, scoring once and tallying four assists.

=== Senior ===
After graduating college, Mueller moved to Europe to play amateur soccer with TB Uphusen in Germany. In the summer of the following year, Mueller returned to the United States with the Long Island Rough Riders of USL League Two, making two appearances during the 2018 season.

In July 2018, Mueller returned to Europe, signing with National League North club Southport. He made his league debut for the club on August 7, 2018, playing the entirety of a 3–1 home defeat to Altrincham.

In March 2020, Mueller returned to the States once again, signing with USL League One club Tormenta FC. He made his competitive debut for the club on July 25, 2020, playing the entirety of a 2–2 home draw with the Chattanooga Red Wolves.

On March 8, 2022, Mueller was transferred to USL Championship side Rio Grande Valley FC for an undisclosed fee.

Mueller joined USL League One club Union Omaha on January 31, 2023.
