= Shaft Brewer Jr. =

American soccer player (born 1999)

Personal information
- Date of birth: October 28, 1999 (age 27)
- Place of birth: Sacramento, California, United States
- Height: 5 ft 9 in (1.75 m)
- Positions: Winger; right-back

Team information
- Current team: Birkirkara

Youth career
- 2015–2016: Sacramento Republic
- 2016: FC Dallas
- 2016–2017: RB Leipzig

Senior career*
Years	Team	Apps	(Gls)
2018–2019	Los Angeles FC	4	(0)
2018–2019	→ Phoenix Rising (loan)	9	(0)
2020–2021	Fram Larvik	24	(3)
2022–2023	Union Omaha	37	(1)
2024	North Carolina FC	29	(1)
2025–2026	Valletta	25	(0)
2026–	Birkirkara	0	(0)

International career
2016–2017	United States U18	11	(2)
2018	United States U20	2	(0)
- * Club domestic league appearances and goals as of May 7, 2026

Shaft Brewer Jr. (born October 28, 1999) is an American professional soccer player who currently plays as right-back for Maltese Premier League club Birkirkara.

== Club career ==
=== Youth ===
Brewer played with USL side Sacramento Republic's academy team from 2015, where he was their top goal scorer, before moving to the academy team at MLS club FC Dallas a year later, where he won the Dallas Cup Gordon Jago Super Group title. He again moved in 2017 when he joined Bundesliga club RB Leipzig in Germany, where he appeared three times for their under-19 side, scoring one goal.

=== Los Angeles FC ===
Brewer joined MLS side Los Angeles FC on March 21, 2018, during their inaugural season. Los Angeles traded a fourth-round 2019 MLS SuperDraft pick and $50,000 of General Allocation Money to FC Dallas to acquire his rights. He made his professional debut for on June 2, 2018, coming on as a 77th-minute substitute in a 2–1 loss to FC Dallas.

=== Fram Larvik ===
On August 6, 2020, he joined Norwegian Second Division side Fram Larvik.

=== Union Omaha ===
On August 18, 2022, Brewer signed with USL League One side Union Omaha.

=== North Carolina FC ===
Brewer joined North Carolina FC on December 19, 2023, ahead of the club's return to the USL Championship.

=== Valletta ===
On June 24, 2025, Brewer officially joined Maltese Premier League side Valletta on a permanent deal.
