= Ian McGrane =

American soccer player

Personal information
- Full name: Ian McGrane
- Date of birth: November 22, 1995 (age 30)
- Place of birth: Kingston, Pennsylvania, United States
- Height: 1.96 m (6 ft 5 in)
- Position: Goalkeeper

Team information
- Current team: Union Omaha
- Number: 25

College career
Years	Team	Apps	(Gls)
2014	Monroe Mustangs	10	(0)
2015–2016	Green Bay Phoenix	0	(0)
2017–2018	South Carolina Gamecocks	11	(0)

Senior career*
Years	Team	Apps	(Gls)
2016	FC Miami City		
2017–2018	SC United Bantams	14	(0)
2019	AFC Ann Arbor	12	(0)
2019	Stumptown Athletic	2	(0)
2020–2021	Tampa Bay Rowdies	0	(0)
2022	Bay Cities	2	(0)
2022	St. Louis City 2	7	(0)
2023–	Union Omaha	5	(0)
- * Club domestic league appearances and goals as of October 18, 2023

Ian McGrane (born November 22, 1995) is an American soccer player who playing for Union Omaha in USL League One as a goalkeeper.

== Career ==
=== College and amateur ===
McGrane began playing college soccer at Monroe College in 2014. He transferred to the University of Wisconsin–Green Bay, but didn't appear for them during his time there. In 2016, McGrane transferred again, this time to the University of South Carolina.

While in college, McGrane had spells with NPSL side FC Miami City in 2016, as well as with USL PDL side SC United Bantams in both 2017 and 2018.

McGrane returned to the NPSL in 2019, playing with AFC Ann Arbor.

=== Professional ===
In September 2019, McGrane signed for NISA side Stumptown Athletic ahead of the league's inaugural season.

McGrane signed with the Tampa Bay Rowdies of USLC on January 31, 2020. Following the 2021 season it was announced that McGrane would leave the Rowdies.

In May 2022, McGrane moved to MLS Next Pro side St. Louis City SC 2. McGrane's contract option was declined in November 2022.
