= Chavany Willis =

Jamaican footballer (born 1997)

Personal information
- Full name: Chavany Shaunjay Willis
- Date of birth: 17 September 1997 (age 29)
- Place of birth: Spanish Town, Jamaica
- Height: 1.85 m (6 ft 1 in)
- Position: Defensive midfielder

Team information
- Current team: Union Omaha
- Number: 6

Senior career*
Years	Team	Apps	(Gls)
2014–2017	Boys' Town	44	(2)
2017–2020	Portmore United	60	(11)
2019	→ Bethlehem Steel (loan)	27	(3)
2021	Arnett Gardens F.C.	4	(1)
2022–	Union Omaha	29	(3)

International career^{‡}
2019	Jamaica U23	2	(0)
2019–	Jamaica	5	(2)
- * Club domestic league appearances and goals as of 16 October 2023 ‡ National team caps and goals as of 17 November 2020

Chavany Shaunjay Willis (born 17 September 1997) is a Jamaican footballer who plays for Union Omaha.

== Career ==
=== Club ===
Willis transferred from Boys Town FC to Portmore United F.C. in 2017, where he played for two seasons. In 2019, Willis was sent on loan to USL Championship team, Bethlehem Steel FC.

In 2022, Willis transferred to USL League One club Union Omaha for an undisclosed fee.

=== International ===
Willis was called up by Jamaica in September 2019 to face Antigua and Guyana in CONCACAF Nations League. Willis made his first senior national start versus Guyana.

=== International goals ===
Scores and results list Jamaica's goal tally first.

No.	Date	Venue	Opponent	Score	Result	Competition
1.	15 October 2019	Ergilio Hato Stadium, Willemstad, Curaçao	Aruba	1–0	6–0	2019–20 CONCACAF Nations League B
2.	15 November 2019	Sir Vivian Richards Stadium, North Sound, Antigua and Barbuda	Antigua and Barbuda	1–0	2–0	2019–20 CONCACAF Nations League B

== Honors ==
=== Portmore United ===
- Jamaica National Premier League: 2

2017–18, 2018–19
