= Gary Green (sports owner) =

American businessman and entrepreneur (born 1965)

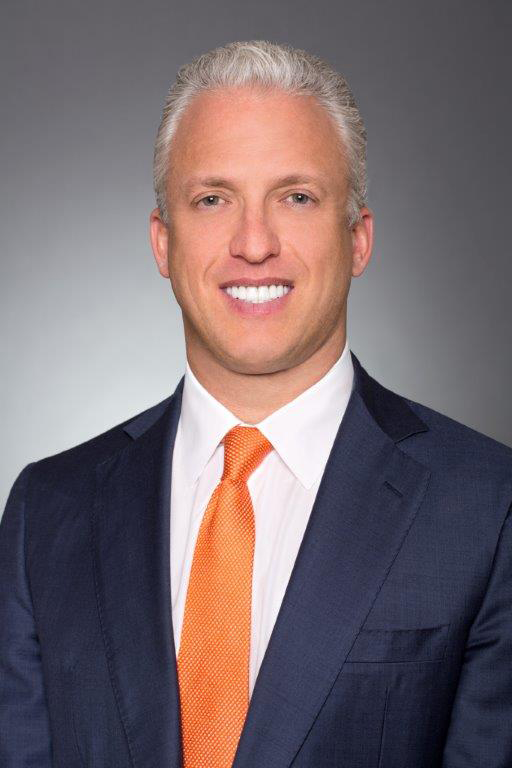
- Born: Gary Michael Green; September 8, 1965 (age 61); Manhasset, New York
- Occupations: CEO of Alliance Building Services, CEO of Alliance Baseball LLC & CEO of Alliance Omaha Soccer Holdings LLC
- Parent(s): Sandra Elaine Turboff Green; Stephen L. Green

Gary Michael Green (born September 8, 1965) is an American businessman and entrepreneur. He is the former CEO of Alliance Building Services, one of the largest privately held building service providers in North America and current owner of multiple sports franchises for teams in Minor League Baseball and United Soccer League, including the Richmond Flying Squirrels, Montgomery Biscuits and Union Omaha.

== Early life ==
Green was born in Manhasset, New York and attended Great Neck North High School in Great Neck, New York and graduated in 1983.

Green attended Union College in Schenectady, New York for one year (1983–1984) before transferring to University of Vermont in the fall of 1984. He traveled to Sydney, Australia in his senior year where he studied Australian politics at Macquarie University. Green graduated from University of Vermont in 1988 with a B.A. in political science. He returned to New York City from Australia a year later and enrolled in New York University Stern School of Business where he earned an M.B.A. in finance in 1991.

After completing his M.B.A., Green worked as a real estate broker for Abrams Benisch Riker and Riverbank Realty. He also taught real estate finance in the Executive Division of New York University Stern School of Business.

Green then worked for his family's real estate company, SL Green Real Estate, where he launched and ran its brokerage division. As vice president, he played a role in the redevelopment of the company's commercial building portfolio.

== Alliance Building Services ==
In 1992, at the age of 26, Green founded Alliance Building Services. Green formed First Quality Maintenance, a subsidiary of Alliance, out of a frustration with mediocre janitorial service companies that overcharged landlords and tenants. He wasn't satisfied with just mimicking an "old guard" business; he wanted to change the business model.

In 1997, Alliance bought Classic Security and acquired a lighting and electrical company as a complement to the other business under Alliance. After the September 11, 2001 terrorist attacks on the World Trade Center, Alliance Building Services' security business took a major role in protecting the city and providing cleaning services in the aftermath.

Alliance acquired Bright Star Messenger Centers in 2001. In 2008, Alliance purchased Onyx Restoration and Painting. In 2009, Alliance provided maintenance services for the inaugural seasons of the new Yankee Stadium and Citi Field, the home of the New York Mets. Alliance provides cleaning services to the Empire State Building as well.

Alliance is one of the largest privately held building service providers in North America, with approximately 5,000 employees.

== Sports ownership ==
In 2009, Green co-founded Alliance Baseball LLC with business partner and fellow baseball enthusiast Larry Botel. Green and Botel negotiated to a buy a large stake in the Connecticut Defenders from owner Lou DiBella. Green, Botel, and DiBella closed the deal in 2009 and immediately relocated the team to Richmond under its new name: the Richmond Flying Squirrels. The team drew nearly a half-million fans in its first year and led all of Minor League Baseball in merchandise sales. Style Weekly named Green, Botel, and DiBella 2010 Richmonders of the Year.

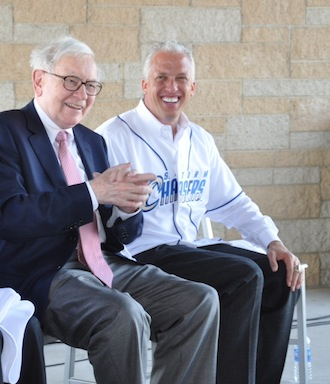
Warren Buffett (left) and Gary Green (right) at news conference announcing new ownership of the Omaha Storm Chasers

In June 2012, Green acquired the Omaha Storm Chasers. He negotiated and closed the deal to buy the franchise from owners Warren Buffett, Walter Scott, Jr., and Bill Shea. Green's ownership of the franchise ended a 21-year streak in which an Omahan had owned at least a piece of the team. Former Storm Chasers owner Warren Buffett was confident that Green's record as a successful businessman and team owner would transfer over into the new venture and lauded Green's experience at a press conference announcing the change in ownership: “We know he’s a great owner, we know he has enormous enthusiasm for the game, and he loves Omaha,” Buffett said. “It doesn’t get better than that." Buffett continued, “After 21 years, we want someone who is going to keep it for the next 21 years or more, and he’s that sort of fella.”

In May 2017, Green and Botel again partnered with Lou DiBella to purchase the Montgomery Biscuits, the Tampa Bay Rays' Double-A affiliate.

In 2019, Green and Botel took their experience in the sports industry and negotiated to buy an expansion franchise from the United Soccer League (USL). Alliance Omaha Soccer Holdings was granted the rights to own and operate a professional soccer team in the Omaha area. In May 2019, Green and Omaha Storm Chasers President & General Manager Martie Cordaro along with officials from USL League One announced Omaha as the home of a new franchise to begin play in 2020. Union Omaha became the first professional team in Omaha. The team plays its matches at Werner Park alongside the Omaha Storm Chasers, also owned by Green. The team made its home debut in August 2020.

In 2024, Green sold the Storm Chasers to Diamond Baseball Holdings in order to focus on the development of Union Omaha.

== Philanthropy ==
Green was a national board member of the advocacy group Third Millennium and a founder of its New York City chapter. Green testified in front of the U.S. House Ways and Means' Subcommittee on Social Security on behalf of Third Millennium "calling on the government to institute Social Security reform 'yesterday.'" At its peak, the group had 2,000 members in all 50 states.

In May 2005, Green was awarded the Builders of Freedom Award in acknowledgment of his work with the Israel Bonds campaign. Green has received numerous awards for his philanthropic support of various charities including North Shore Child and Family Guidance Association; the Chrysanthemum Event in November 2001; the Award of Courage Corporation's Humanitarian Award in April 2008 in support of cancer research; Ronald McDonald House of New York's Children's Champion award in recognition of his continued support in November 2009 and again in October 2013; the Starlight Starbright Children's Foundation award for his work on behalf of the charity, which aids seriously ill children and their families, on July 17, 2006.

On February 5, 2019, Green was awarded the M. Anthony Fisher Humanitarian Award at the 39th Annual Thurman Munson Awards Dinner, recognizing Alliance's support of AHRC.

During the COVID-19 pandemic, Green donated 500,000 masks across the nation to raise awareness for frontline workers. Union Omaha also announced a free partnership with CHI Health and Nebraska Medicine as its jersey sponsors in honor of 1st responders.

In 2023 Gary and Amy Green formed Green Vision, a foundation to collaborate with organizations who share their vision of a better, more sustainable planet. Green Vision acts as an ambassador for these organizations as well as pinpointing areas where financial support will have the greatest impact.

== Media ==
Green was recognized in Timothy Dobbins' book Stepping Up: Make Decisions that Matter. Green is also highlighted as a baseball and New York Mets historian in the 2010 documentary on Billy Joel's Last Play at Shea. Green also served as co-executive producer for the Emmy-nominated ESPN 30 for 30 film "Doc & Darryl", which "chronicles the glory days and destructive nights" of Dwight Gooden and Darryl Strawberry.

In February 2017, Green led a group to buy the baseball media company Baseball America. In announcing the deal, Green stated, "We're excited to take ownership of one of the great baseball media brands. No other outlet covers the sport so thoroughly and definitively as Baseball America".
