= Marco Milanese =

Italian archaeologist

Marco Milanese (born 27 October 1958) is an Italian archaeologist. He graduated in archaeology in 1981 from the University of Genoa. In 1983 he won the 3rd edition of the Bretschneider's Erma International Archaeology Prize in Rome, with the work Scavi nell'oppidum pre-romano di Genova.

In 1987 he obtained his PhD in archaeology at the University of Pisa, Siena and Florence. Since 1992 he has been teaching, as associate professor, in archaeological research methodologies and medieval archaeology at the Universities of Sassari, Genoa, Arezzo and Pisa. Since 2003 he has been full professor in Sassari.

== Publications ==
- with Giovanni Aliprandi, La Ceramica Europea Introduzione alla tecnologia alla storia e all'arte, Editore: ECIG Edizioni culturali internazionali Genova, (1986) ISBN 978-88-7545-168-4 ISBN 978-88-7545-168-4
- with Riccardo Francovich, Lo Scavo archeologico di Montarrenti e i problemi dell'incastellamento medievale. Esperienze a confronto, Firenze ISBN 978-88-7814-075-2
- Scavi nell'oppidum preromando di Genova (Genova-S. Silvestro 1), Breitschneider, 1987
- Genova romana. Mercato e città dalla tarda età repubblicana a Diocleziano dagli scavi del colle di Castello (Genova-San Silvestro), Ed. L'Erma di Bretschneider, Roma, 1993 ISBN 978-88-7062-802-9 ISBN 978-88-7062-802-9
- Archeologia Postmedievale: l'esperienza europea e l'Italia, Florence: Ed. all'Insegna del Giglio, 1997
- Uchi Maius tardo antica e islamica. Miscellanea di studi 1997-2002, Plus – Università di Pisa, 2003
- Studi e ricerche sul villaggio medievale di Geridu. Miscellanea 1996-2001, QUAVAS - Quaderni del Centro di Documentazione dei Villaggi Abbandonati della Sardegna, 2004 ISBN 978-88-7814-257-2
- Alghero. Archeologia di una città medievale, Sassari. 2013 ISBN 978-88-7138-646-1
