= Noe Meza =

American soccer player (born 1998)

Personal information
- Date of birth: February 13, 1998 (age 28)
- Place of birth: Sunnyside, Washington, U.S.
- Height: 1.78 m (5 ft 10 in)
- Position: Forward

Youth career
- 2013–2015: Three Rivers Soccer Club
- 2015: Yakima United
- 2016: Crossfire Academy

College career
Years	Team	Apps	(Gls)
2016–2021	Seattle Redhawks	62	(21)

Senior career*
Years	Team	Apps	(Gls)
2019	Seattle Sounders FC U-23	5	(4)
2021	Charlotte Eagles	11	(1)
2022–2023	Union Omaha	58	(21)
2024	Memphis 901	25	(0)
- * Club domestic league appearances and goals as of November 13, 2024

Noe Meza (born February 13, 1998) is an American soccer player who plays as a forward.

== Career ==
=== Youth, College & Amateur ===
Meza attended Sunnyside High School in Sunnyside, Washington, where he helped his team to became district, regional and league champions in 2014. He was Big Nine Conference first team in 2013, 2014 and 2015, top scorer for the team in 2014 and 2015, and named Team MVP in 2015. Meza also played club soccer with Three Rivers Soccer Club, Yakima United, who competed in the Evergreen Premier League, and Crossfire Academy.

In 2016, Meza attended Seattle University to play college soccer. He redshirted his freshman season, but went on to make 62 appearances for the Redhawks, scoring 28 goals and tallying 10 assists. Meza was named First Team All-Western Athletic Conference in his senior year. In his time at Seattle University, Meza completed his bachelor's degree in mechanical engineering.

While at college, Meza played in the USL League Two. In 2019, he made five appearances, scoring four goacomls for Seattle Sounders FC U-23. In 2021, he made 11 appearances for Charlotte Eagles, scoring a single goal.

=== Professional ===
On February 1, 2022, Meza signed his first professional contract with USL League One club Union Omaha. He made his professional league debut for Omaha on April 9, 2022, starting in a 2–2 draw with Forward Madison FC.

On January 4, 2024, Meza signed with Memphis 901 FC of USL Championship to a multi-year deal.
