= Jay Mims =

American soccer player and coach (born 1977)

Personal information
- Full name: Jason Mims
- Date of birth: 1977 (age 48–49)
- Place of birth: Memphis, Tennessee

Team information
- Current team: Puerto Rico (caretaker)

College career
Years	Team	Apps	(Gls)
1995–1999	Saint Louis Billikens		

Senior career*
Years	Team	Apps	(Gls)
2000	Cincinnati Riverhawks	10	(2)

Managerial career
- 2001–2010: Creighton Bluejays (assistant)
- 2011: Penn State Nittany Lions (assistant)
- 2011–2018: Omaha Mavericks
- 2018–2019: Real Salt Lake (academy director)
- 2018–2019: Real Monarchs (assistant)
- 2019–2022: Union Omaha
- 2026: Puerto Rico (caretaker)
- * Club domestic league appearances and goals

Jason Mims is an American soccer coach.

== Playing career ==
Mims grew up in Memphis, Tennessee. He then attended Saint Louis Billikens men's soccer in St. Louis, Missouri, where he was a four-year starting midfielder from 1995 to 1999. Mims then played one year of professional soccer for the Cincinnati Riverhawks where he made 10 appearances and scored 2 goals.

== Coaching career ==
=== College career ===
After Mims retired from professional soccer he was hired as an assistant for the Creighton Bluejays. He spent nine years with Creighton before he was hired by the Omaha Mavericks as the first head coach in their soccer program's history. While there he brought the program national success, until leaving in mid-2018 for a spot in the Real Salt Lake academy system.

=== Real Salt Lake Academy ===
Mims accepted a position working with the Real Salt Lake academy. While there he primarily worked with the U-18 and U-19 development teams. Moreover, when the head coach of the Salt Lake reserve team, Real Monarchs, left the team, Mims joined as an assistant to Jámison Olave.

=== Union Omaha ===
On May 7, 2019, Mims was announced as the head coach of the new USL League One club, Union Omaha. Mims was named League One Coach of the Year in 2021. On December 16, 2022, Mims resigned from his position with Union Omaha.

=== Memphis 901 FC ===
In December 2023, Mims returned to his hometown to act as Chief Operations Officer for Memphis 901 in the USL Championship.

=== Puerto Rico ===
In March 2026, Mims was named head coach of the Puerto Rico national football team ahead of the FIFA Series competition. After defeating Guam and U.S. Virgin Islands, Mims guided Puerto Rico to its first men's senior tournament championship.
