= John Scearce =

American soccer player (born 1997)

Personal information
- Full name: John Paul Scearce
- Date of birth: December 19, 1997 (age 28)
- Place of birth: Nogales, Arizona, United States
- Height: 1.85 m (6 ft 1 in)
- Position: Midfielder

Team information
- Current team: Phoenix Rising FC

College career
Years	Team	Apps	(Gls)
2016–2017	Yavapai Roughriders	38	(9)
2018–2019	Cornell Big Red	31	(10)

Senior career*
Years	Team	Apps	(Gls)
2019	Lionsbridge FC	12	(0)
2020–2023	Union Omaha	98	(16)
2024–	Phoenix Rising	76	(5)
- * Club domestic league appearances and goals as of 18:52, 10 November 2026 (UTC)

John Paul "JP" Scearce (born December 19, 1997) is an American soccer player who plays as a midfielder for Phoenix Rising FC in USL Championship.

== Career ==
=== High school ===
Scearce attended Chaparral High School in Scottsdale, Arizona, where he was a member of the soccer team. He was an all-city selection both as a junior and a senior. Scearce also played club soccer for CCV Stars 98, which he captained.

=== College and amateur ===
Scearce began playing college soccer at Yavapai College in 2016, where he spent two seasons, making a total of 38 regular season appearances, scoring 13 goals and tallying 31 assists for the Roughriders. For his junior season, Scearce transferred to Cornell University. In his two seasons with Big Red, Scearce made 30 appearances, scoring 10 goals and tallying three assists. He also earned second-team All-Northeast Region honors from United Soccer Coaches.

In his senior college season, Scearce played in the USL League Two with Lionsbridge FC in 2019.

=== Professional ===
On February 16, 2020, Scearce signed with USL League One side Union Omaha. He made his professional debut on August 1, 2020, appearing as an 84th-minute substitute in a 1–0 win over North Texas SC.

On December 12, 2023, Scearce signed with Phoenix Rising FC in the USL Championship.
