= Morrison Stadium =

Soccer stadium in Omaha, Nebraska, USA

Coordinates: 41.264743°N 95.939398°W

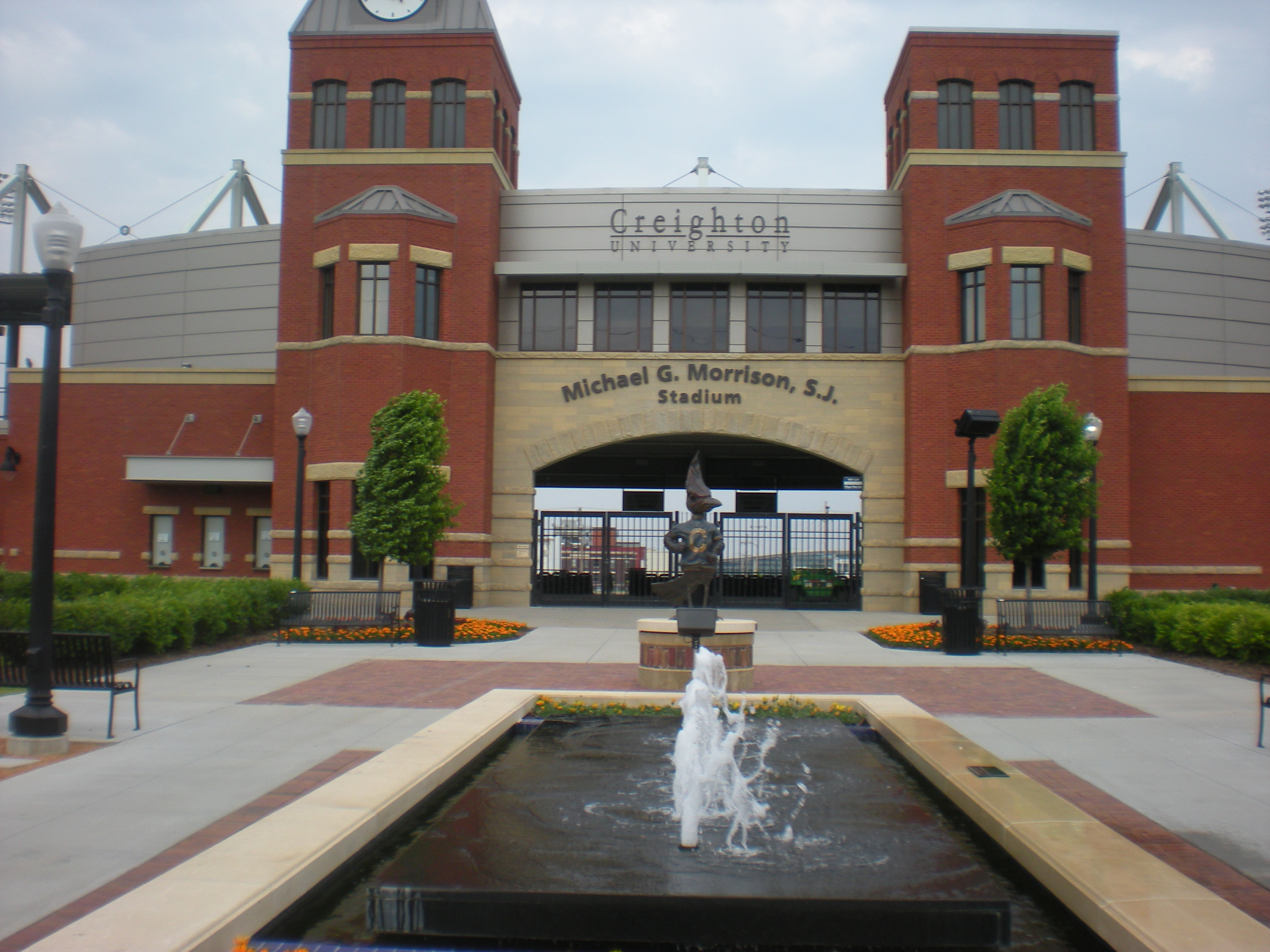
- Entrance to the stadium as seen in 2010
- Interactive map of Morrison Stadium
- Full name: Michael J. Morrison, S.J., Stadium
- Former names: Creighton Soccer Field
- Address: 19th and California; Omaha, NE; United States
- Owner: Creighton University
- Operator: Creighton Univ. Athletics
- Capacity: 6,000
- Type: Soccer-specific stadium
- Surface: Arena Grass
- Current use: Soccer

Construction
- Groundbreaking: 2002
- Opened: August 2003; 23 years ago
- Cost: $14 million
- Architect: DLR Group

Tenants
- Creighton Bluejays (NCAA) teams: men's and women's (2003–present); Union Omaha (USL League One) (2026–present)

Website
- gocreighton.com/morrison-stadium

Morrison Stadium is a 6,000-seat soccer-specific stadium located between 17th and 19th Streets to the north of Cass Street, on the east side of the Creighton University campus in the NoDo neighborhood of Omaha, Nebraska. The main entrance and ticket window is located on the west side, at the intersection of California and Florence Blvd (19th Street).

The stadium is home to the Creighton Bluejays men's and women's soccer teams. It also hosts the USL League One club Union Omaha.

== History ==
Designed by architectural firm DLR Group, the stadium opened in the fall of 2003 as the "Creighton Soccer Field". During this season, the facility was limited to the artificial playing surface and berm seating located on the east side of the field. The grandstand, reserved seating, upper-level suites, press box, and video board were completed in the fall of 2004 when the facility was renamed Michael G. Morrison, S.J. Stadium after the university's former president.

The first goal in NCAA competition was scored by future U.S. national team legend Clint Dempsey on August 31, 2003, for Furman University.

The hill behind the north goal was renovated in 2013, making space for a field entrance and updated berm seating. Several suites and coaching offices were added to the second level of the stadium in 2017. A new videoboard was built in 2023. It stands 24 feet tall and 56.4 feet wide.

== Events ==
Morrison Stadium has hosted many significant postseason matches including the Missouri Valley Conference men's soccer tournament on three occasions and the women's soccer conference tournament six times. The stadium has also hosted over 20 NCAA Division I soccer tournament matches, including quarterfinal matches in 2011 and 2014.

Morrison Stadium is also the host for the boys and girls Nebraska high school (NSAA) Class A and Class B soccer state championships in May.

The stadium became the new home for Union Omaha for the 2026 season. The USL League One club moved to Morrison after playing their home matches at Werner Park from 2020–2025.

Morrison Stadium has also hosted the annual Kicks for a Cure fundraiser every spring since 2006. The goal of the event is to raise funds and awareness for local cancer research.

The stadium hosts a variety of non-soccer events including concerts, the Nebraska Special Olympics, and tailgating events for the College World Series hosted by Creighton University every summer.

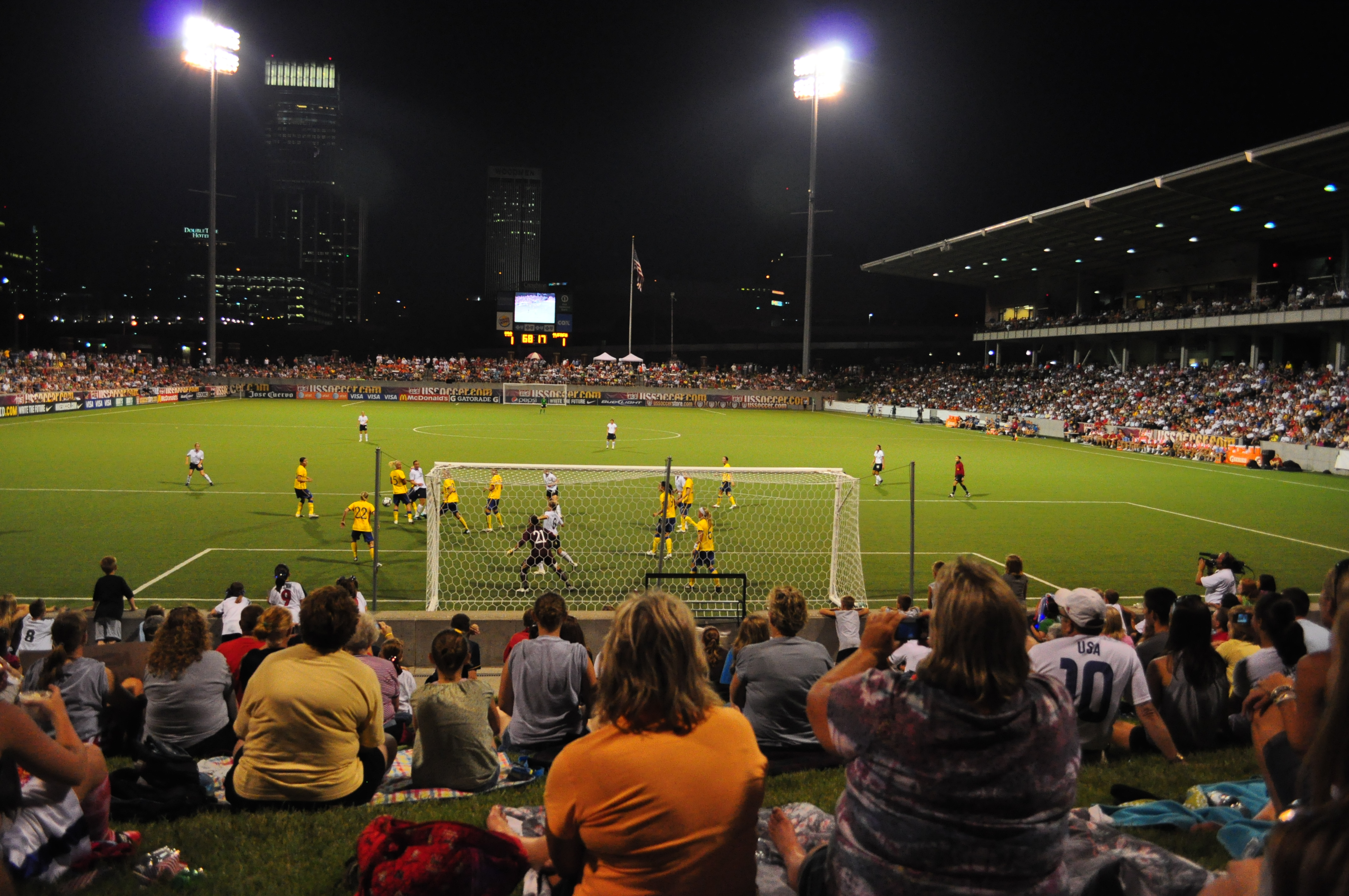
Morrison Stadium hosting an international friendly between the US and Sweden in 2010

=== International matches ===
Morrison Stadium hosted the state of Nebraska's first international friendly on July 13, 2010, where the women's national soccer teams of the United States and Sweden played to a 1–1 draw.

On July 25, 2026, Union Omaha hosted the Liga MX club, FC Juárez. The team out of Mexico brought their U-21 squad to Morrison Stadium for a friendly, making it the first time Union Omaha hosted an international club. FC Juárez won the match 3–1.

July 13, 2010 Friendly	United States	1–1	Sweden	Omaha, NE
20:00 CT	Rodriguez 44'	Report	Forsberg 57'	Stadium: Morrison Stadium; Attendance: 6,493; Referee: Felisha Mariscal (United States)

July 25, 2026 Friendly	Union Omaha (USL1)	1–3	FC Juarez (Liga MX)	Omaha, NE
6:00 CDT	Klein 49'	Report	Galvan 23' Galvan 67' Cota 89'	Stadium: Morrison Stadium; Referee: Jacob Larson

=== Record attendance ===
The attendance at the NSAA 2013 Class A high school boys championship, won by Omaha South over Creighton Prep, was estimated at 8,200, making it the highest-attended soccer match ever in the state of Nebraska.

May 13, 2013 Final	Omaha South	1–0	Creighton Prep	Omaha, NE
7:45pm	Jose Marquez 76'	Report		Stadium: Morrison Stadium; Attendance: 8,200; Referee: Jim McVay

== See also ==
- Creighton University
- Sports in Omaha, Nebraska
- Al Caniglia Field
- CHI Health Center Omaha
- Charles Schwab Field
