= Rashid Nuhu =

Ghanaian footballer (born 1995)

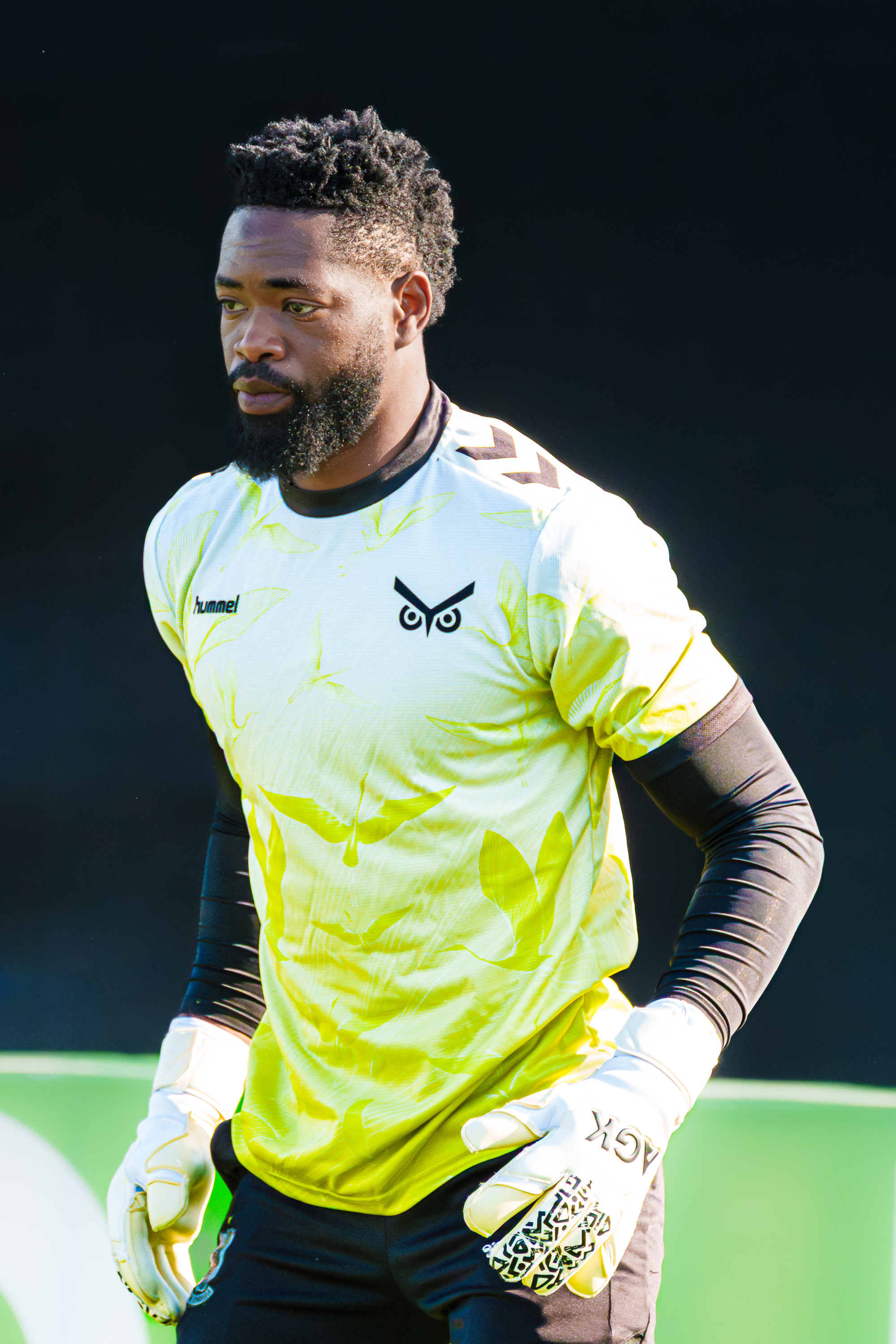
- Nuhu with Union Omaha in 2026

Personal information
- Date of birth: December 7, 1995 (age 30)
- Place of birth: Accra, Ghana
- Height: 1.88 m (6 ft 2 in)
- Position: Goalkeeper

Team information
- Current team: Union Omaha
- Number: 24

Youth career
- –2011: Right to Dream Academy

College career
Years	Team	Apps	(Gls)
2015–2018	Fordham Rams	74	(0)

Senior career*
Years	Team	Apps	(Gls)
2016	Westchester Flames	9	(0)
2018	New York Red Bulls U-23	8	(0)
2019	New York Red Bulls II	4	(0)
2020–	Union Omaha	149	(0)
- * Club domestic league appearances and goals as of October 31, 2026

Rashid Nuhu (born 7 December 1995) is a Ghanaian footballer who currently plays as a goalkeeper for Union Omaha in USL League One.

== Career ==
=== Youth and college ===
Nuhu played four years of college soccer at Fordham University between 2015 and 2018, where he made a total of 74 appearances for the Rams. He was named first team All-Atlantic 10 Conference in both his junior and senior seasons and the Most Outstanding Player of the 2016 Atlantic 10 Men's Soccer Tournament as a sophomore after posting three consecutive clean sheets as Fordham won the tournament.

While at college, Nuhu also played in the USL PDL for both Westchester Flames, in 2016, and New York Red Bulls U-23 in 2018.

=== New York Red Bulls II ===
On January 14, 2019, Nuhu was drafted 70th overall in the 2019 MLS SuperDraft by New York Red Bulls. On May 6, 2019, Nuhu signed for the club's USL Championship affiliate New York Red Bulls II.

=== Union Omaha ===
On February 16, 2020, Nuhu was announced by Union Omaha in a Twitter video before the teams' first preseason match against Real Monarchs at the 2020 Wasatch Winter Cup.

== Personal ==
Rashid is the young brother of Ghanaian international footballer Razak Nuhu.
