= Werner Park =

Baseball park in Papillion, Nebraska, U.S.

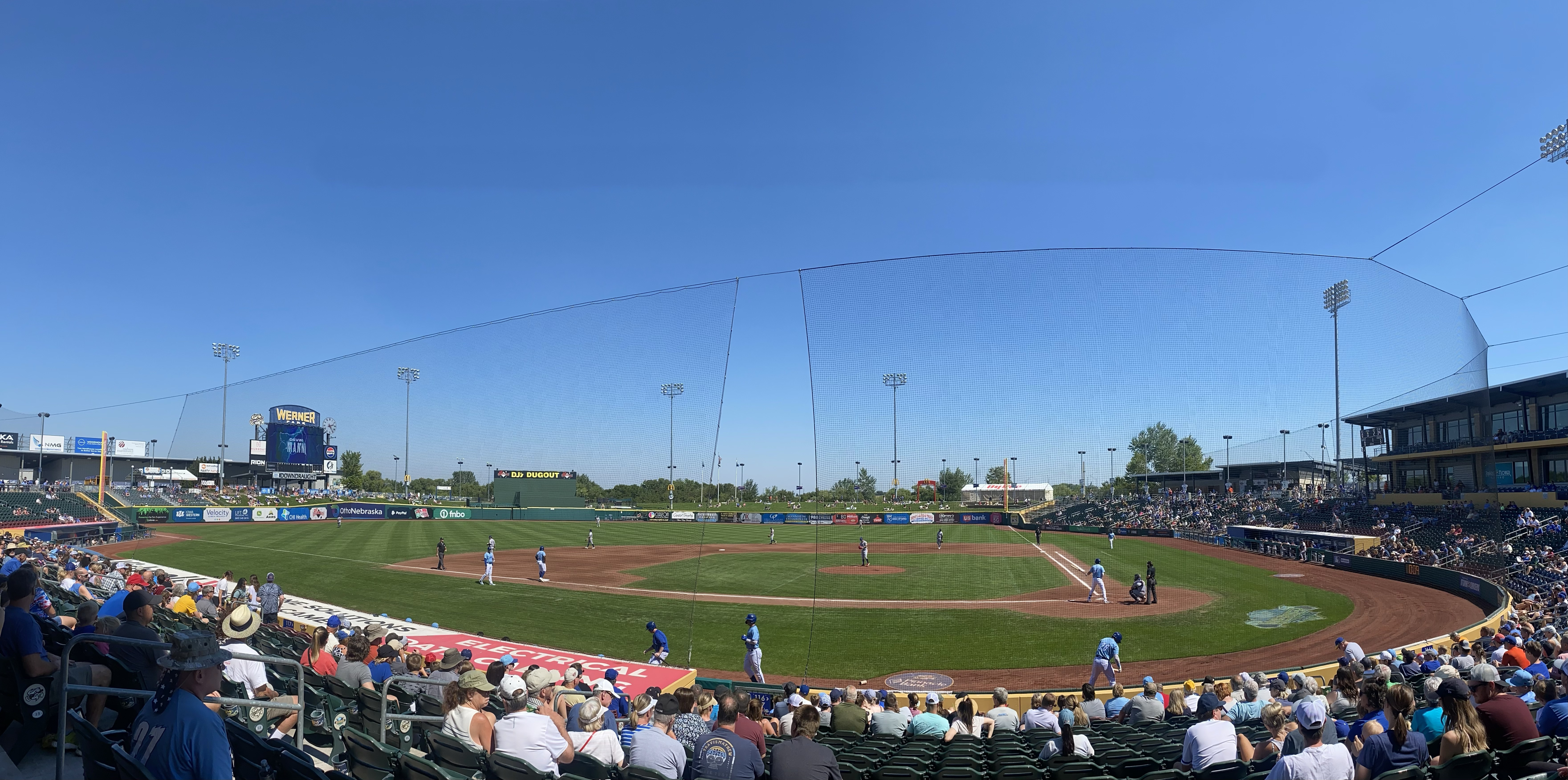
- Hosting St. Paul in September 2024
- Interactive map of Werner Park
- Address: 12356 Ballpark Way
- Location: Papillion, Nebraska, U.S.
- Coordinates: 41.1514°N 96.107°W
- Elevation: 1,150 ft (350 m) AMSL
- Owner: Sarpy County
- Operator: Omaha Storm Chasers
- Capacity: 9,023 total; 6,254 fixed seats, 14 private suites, grass berm seating, and standing room
- Surface: Kentucky bluegrass / ryegrass blend
- Record attendance: 9,351 (March 25, 2019, versus Kansas City Royals)
- Field size: Left field: 310 ft (94 m); Center field: 402 ft (123 m); Right field: 315 ft (96 m)

Construction
- Groundbreaking: August 12, 2009
- Opened: April 11, 2011; 15 years ago
- Cost: $36 million ($51.5 million in 2025)
- Architect: DLR Group
- General contractor: The Weitz Company

Tenants
- Omaha Storm Chasers (PCL/AAAE/IL) 2011−present Omaha Mavericks (NCAA) 2013−2020; Union Omaha (USL1) 2020−2025

Werner Park is a minor league ballpark in the midwestern United States, located in Papillion, Nebraska. It is the home of the Omaha Storm Chasers (the Triple A affiliate of Major League Baseball's Kansas City Royals). The University of Nebraska Omaha Mavericks also occasionally used the stadium for some home college baseball games. Opened in 2011, the ballpark cost $36 million to construct. It is located along state highway 370 just east of South 126th Street, in an unincorporated area less than three miles (5 km) west of downtown Papillion, a suburb southwest of Omaha in Sarpy County, which owns the venue.

== History ==
=== Background ===
From 1969 through 2010, the Omaha Royals (named the Golden Spikes from 1999 to 2001) played at Rosenblatt Stadium in south Omaha. The Royals were hobbled by Rosenblatt's size, as it was continuously expanded to accommodate the NCAA Men's College World Series that was played at the park every June. At 23,000 seats in its final configuration, Rosenblatt had 5,000 more seats than the next-largest Triple-A stadium, the Buffalo Bisons’ Coca-Cola Field. In hopes of providing a more intimate setting, capacity was reduced to around 8,500 for Royals games. When the city announced plans to replace Rosenblatt Stadium, it was intended that the new downtown park (TD Ameritrade Park Omaha, now Charles Schwab Field Omaha) would use a capacity of around 12,000 for Royals games.

However, the Royals did not consider that a viable alternative, and subsequently sought to build their own stadium in a different location. Areas both inside and outside Omaha were considered, including other cities nationwide interested in hosting a Triple-A team. They intended to make a final decision on a new location by April 2009. On December 3, 2008, team president Alan Stein announced that the Royals and Sarpy County had signed a memorandum of understanding regarding the construction of a new baseball stadium. On March 17, 2009, the Royals reached a formal agreement with the county for the stadium, and on July 1, Stein announced the deal had been made official.

=== Construction and naming ===
Roger Langpaul, a real estate developer from Des Moines, Iowa, agreed to donate 310 acres (1.3 km^{2}) of land in Sarpy County for construction of the ballpark and other buildings as part of a planned mixed-use development. In exchange, the county agreed to build and maintain roads and make infrastructure improvements for the development. Omaha-based firm DLR Group was chosen as the lead architect and engineer for the project, with the Des Moines-based Weitz Company as general contractor.

Groundbreaking on the ballpark took place on August 12, 2009. Most of the money for construction came from Sarpy County, but the Royals agreed to pay the county $2.35 million towards the construction costs, plus annual rent that covers roughly one-third of the debt payments. The grass for the playing field was planted on September 15, 2010.

On November 11, 2010, the Royals announced they had reached an agreement with Omaha-based transportation company and longtime sponsor Werner Enterprises for the ballpark's naming rights; the deal was initially valued at $305,000 per year for five years, with an option for a five-year renewal. In 2020, the deal was extended for an additional ten years through the 2030 season.

=== Renovation ===
From fall 2019 to spring 2020, Werner Park underwent a $2.4 million renovation in order to prepare the playing surface and facilities for USL League One professional soccer club Union Omaha, that was originally scheduled to begin play in spring 2020; this schedule was subsequently affected by the emergence of the COVID-19 pandemic in the United States. Modifications included a retractable pitcher's mound, alterations to the right field foul pole, and a new building beyond left field to house team staff and equipment.

== Description and features ==
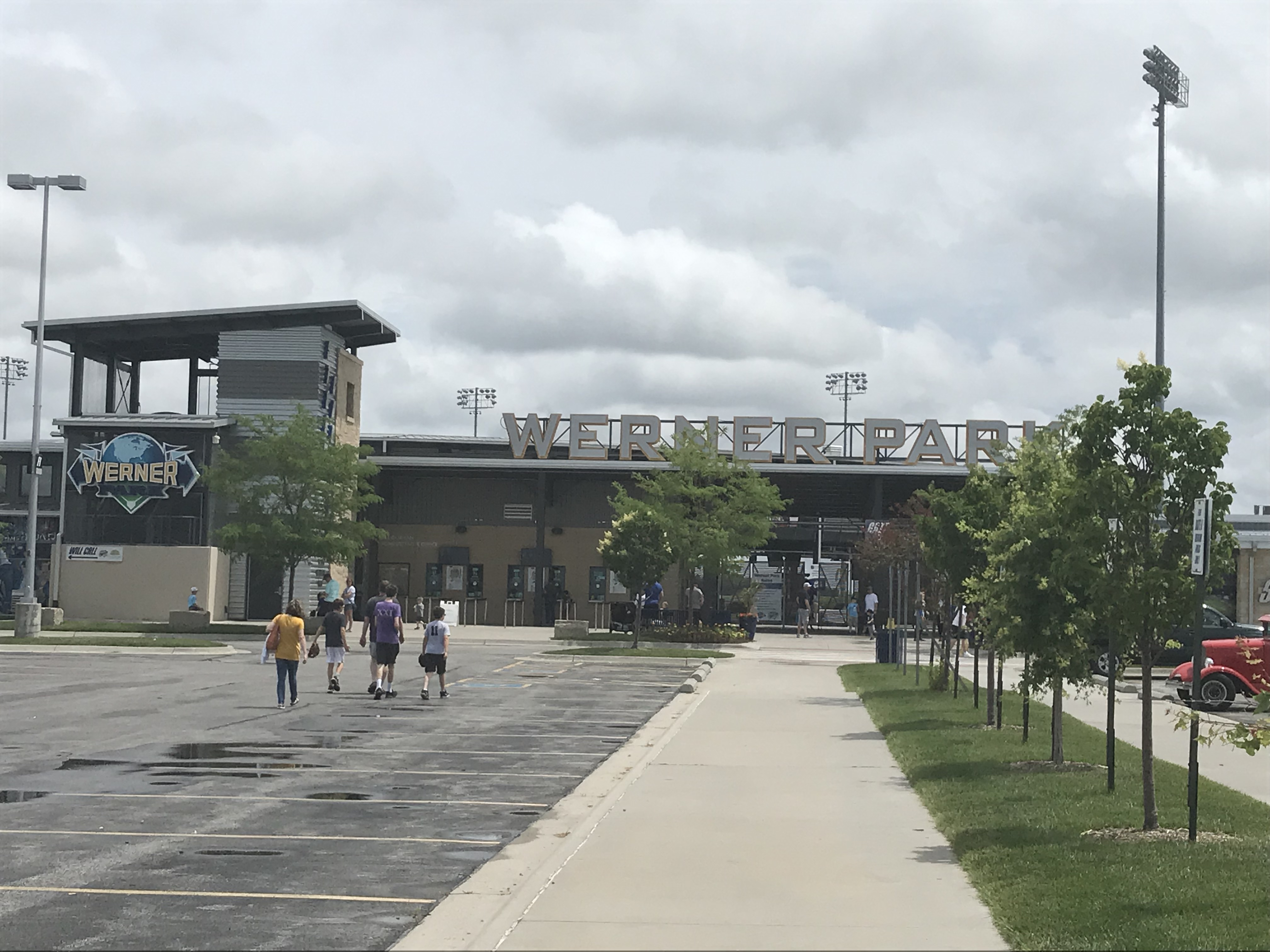
The main entrance to Werner Park in 2019

Werner Park's playing field is aligned northeast (home plate to center field) at an approximate elevation of 1,150 feet (350 m) above sea level; Rosenblatt Stadium had a similar alignment and elevation. Five paved parking lots designated "F1" through "F5" (a reference to the Fujita scale for measuring the intensity of tornadoes, consistent with other weather-related references throughout the park) are located on the premises to the west and north of the stadium. Several spaces for recreational vehicles are located in lot F5. There is an additional overflow gravel lot further to the north, south of Lincoln Road. The main entry gate, ticket office, will call window, and outside team store entrance are located behind home plate, with another entry gate on the third base side. The stadium has a 360-degree concourse, which varies from 50–100 feet (15–30 m) wide at its widest point behind the playing field.

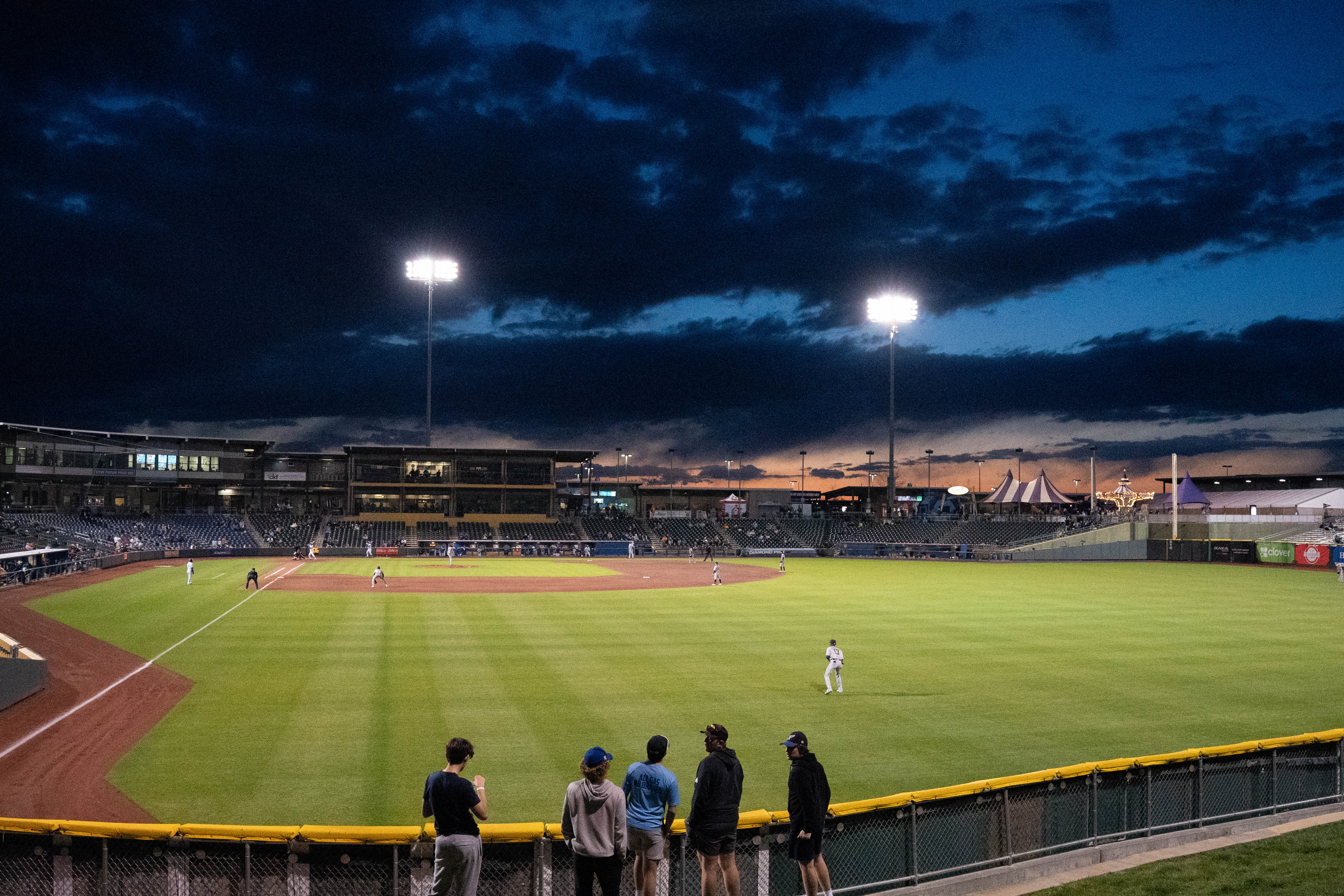
Werner Park in 2023

Werner Park has thirteen climate-controlled luxury suites on two levels behind the first and third base lines, flanking the press box, which is centrally located on the upper level; there are covered open-air "party decks" on each side of the upper level between the suites and the press box. There is also a field-level "dugout suite" along the third base line adjacent to the home dugout. The upper suite level and dugout suite each have their own private restrooms. Seat widths vary from 22 inches (56 cm) in the seating sections directly behind home plate, to 20 inches (51 cm) in the seating sections along the baselines, compared to 18–19 inches (46–48 cm) at Rosenblatt Stadium. All seats have cup holders. Luxury suite, Diamond Club, or Club ticket holders can access an enclosed, climate-controlled bar and seating area on the first level of the third base luxury suites. Two rows of "Diamond Club" cushioned seats are located at the top of seating sections 110 and 111 outside the bar. Prior to the 2021 season, the fixed seats were removed from seating section 100, adjacent to the right field foul pole, and replaced with rows of standing drink rails, reducing the number of fixed seats in the stadium from 6,434 to 6,254. This section is normally a non-reserved area open to any fans with tickets, but is available for reservation by groups of at least 20 fans for a fee.

Werner Park has a grass berm beyond the outfield fence that serves as an additional seating area for fans. A small section of bleachers with backrests called the "Home Run Porch," another non-reserved area open to any fans with tickets, is located on the berm in left field adjacent to the foul pole. The two bullpens are located on the berm in center field, to the right of the batter's eye.

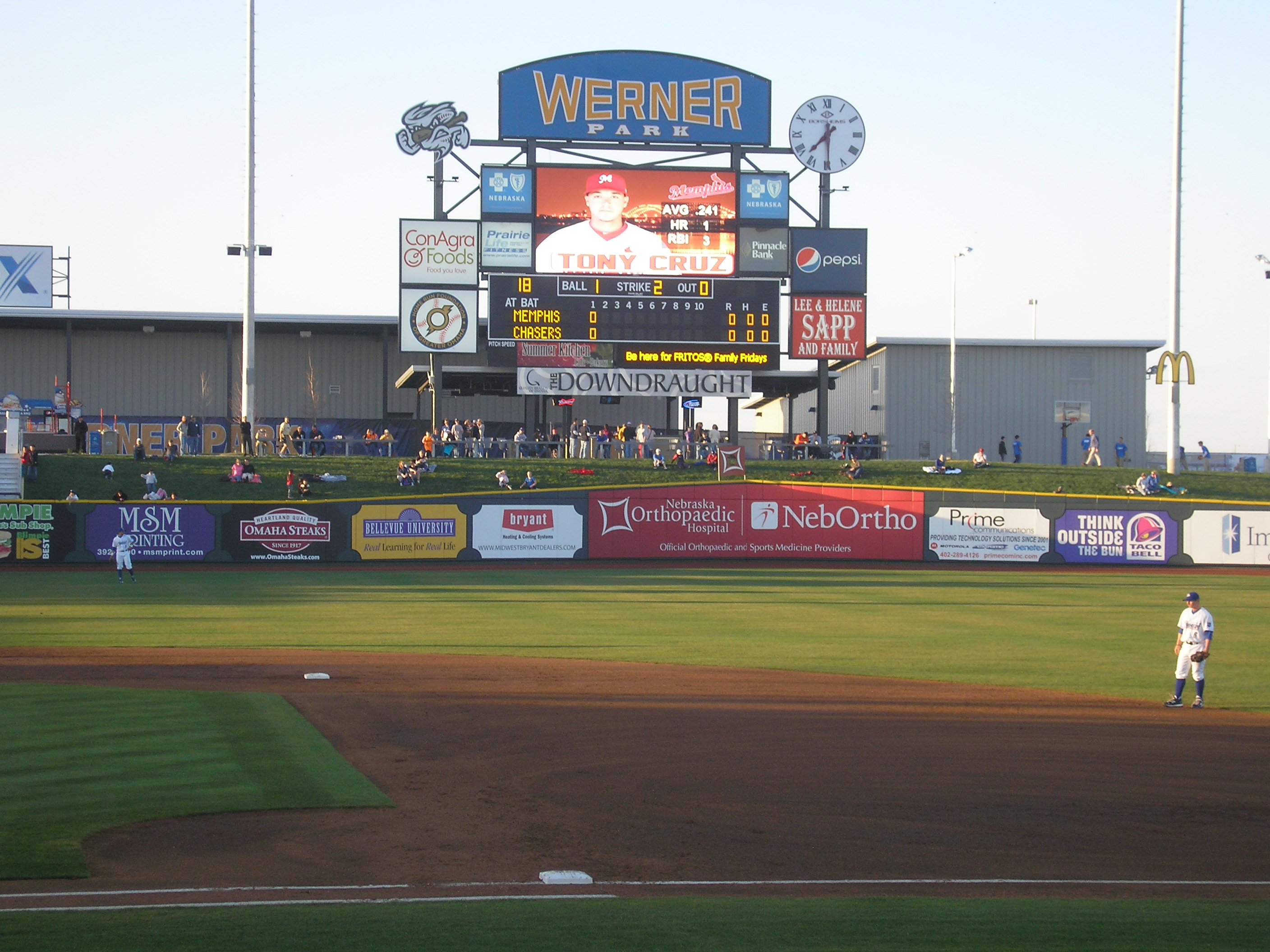
Werner Park's original scoreboard in 2011

Werner Park's original scoreboard and video display was 31 feet (9.4 m) wide and 16 feet (4.9 m) tall (496 ft^{2}). By 2014, the display was malfunctioning frequently and had become difficult to maintain. In January 2015, the Sarpy County board of commissioners voted 4-1 to accept a nearly $600,000 bid from Daktronics of Brookings, South Dakota, for a new high-definition display. The display is 45.5 feet (13.9 m) wide and 25 feet (7.6 m) tall (1,137.5 ft^{2}), over twice as large as the old display. The display can either show one large image, or combinations of live video, instant replays, scoring information, statistics, graphics, animations, or sponsor messages and advertisements. Prior to the 2026 season, a new high-definition display was installed that is twenty percent larger than the old display by virtue of incorporating the old physical line score display and that features a 114 percent increase in resolution (1.34 million pixels versus 625,000 pixels). The park's wireless camera and microphone systems were also upgraded. A bar and beer garden is located below the scoreboard.

The park features a 6,500 square feet (600 m^{2}) children's play area located along the concourse behind left field with a carousel, inflatable bounce house, and other activities. There is also a wiffle ball field and a half-basketball court behind the concourse in left-center field. Tented picnic areas for large groups are located behind the children's play area and along the concourse in right field. A statue of hometown pitching legend Bob Gibson was unveiled outside Werner Park's main entrance in 2013.

== Usage ==
The stadium's first event was a high school rivalry game on April 11, 2011, between the Papillion-La Vista Public Schools' two high schools, Papillion-La Vista South and Papillion-La Vista; the South Titans won, 2–0, over the Monarchs. Having returned to Omaha from two road series versus the Albuquerque Isotopes and Round Rock Express to open their 2011 season, the Storm Chasers opened Werner Park five days later on April 16 with a 2–1 victory over the Nashville Sounds with 6,533 fans in attendance, as top Royals prospect Eric Hosmer went 3-for-3 in the victory. The game was originally scheduled to take place on April 15, but was delayed one day because of inclement weather.

Werner Park was home to USL League One professional soccer club Union Omaha from 2020 to 2025. Werner Park hosted the USL League One Final on two different occasions. Union Omaha earned their first title by defeating Greenville Triumph SC 3-0 in front of a crowd of 5,521 in 2021. Werner Park hosted the final again in 2024 with over 5,800 spectators in the stands. At that time, it set a record for the highest-attended final in the league's history; Union Omaha lifted their second trophy with a 3-0 victory over Spokane Velocity FC. Union Omaha announced on October 30, 2025, that it would use Creighton University's soccer-specific Morrison Stadium for the 2026 season.

From 2013 to 2020, the Omaha Mavericks of the University of Nebraska Omaha sometimes used the venue for several college baseball games each season. The stadium is sometimes used as one of the host sites for the annual Nebraska School Activities Association high school baseball state tournament.

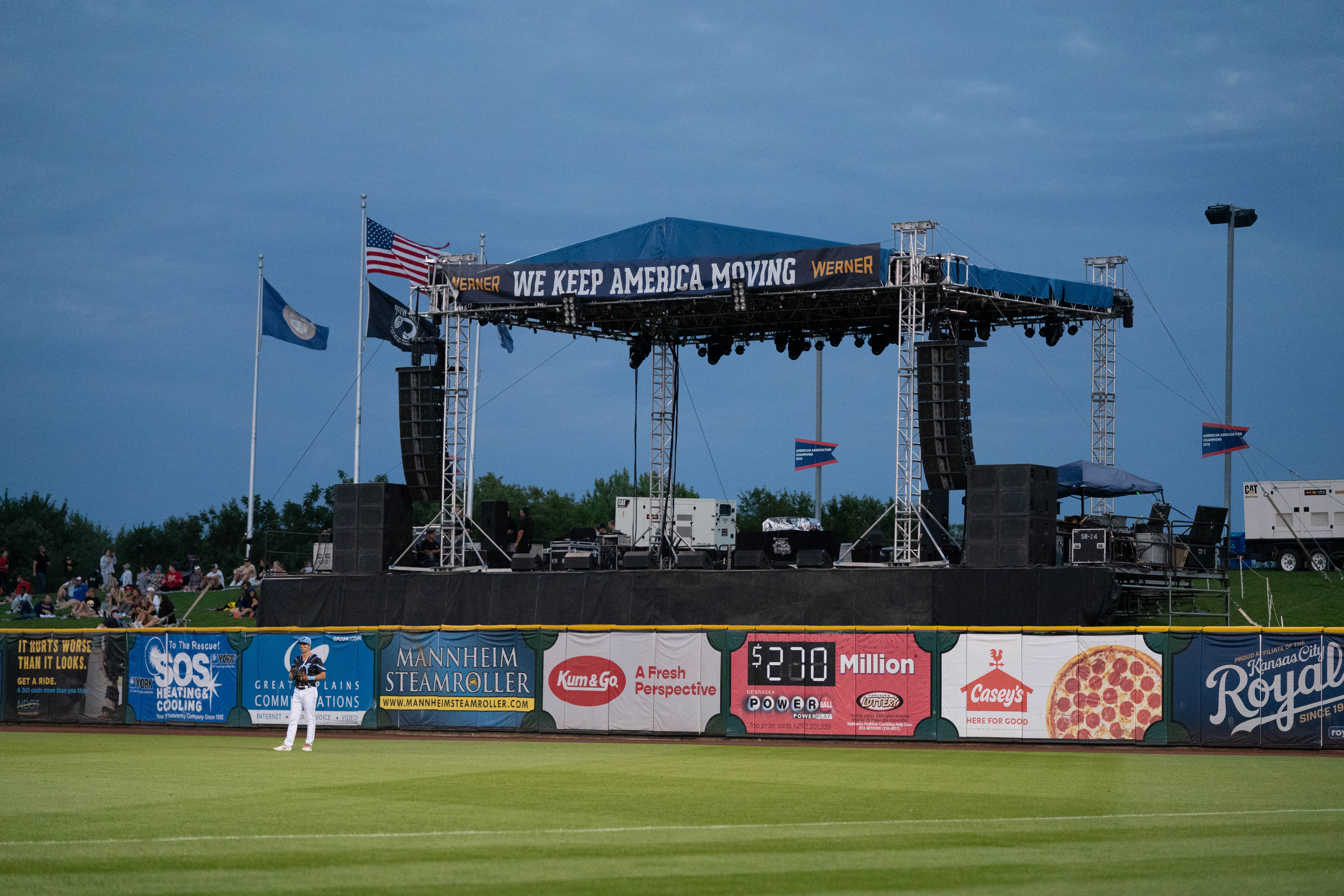
Werner Park stage for Flo Rida concert in 2022

In July 2015, Werner Park hosted the Triple-A All-Star Game and Home Run Derby, the first time the events had been held in Omaha. The Derby, which was won by the Norfolk Tides' Dariel Álvarez, was held on July 13. The All-Star Game was held two days later on July 15. The Storm Chasers were represented at the game by Cheslor Cuthbert, Louis Coleman, and John Lamb as well as trainer Dave Innicca and manager Brian Poldberg, who skippered the PCL team. The IL All-Stars defeated the PCL All-Stars, 4–3.

Werner Park has hosted various concerts over the years. On September 24, 2022, Flo Rida held a concert at Werner Park following the game between the Storm Chasers and the Iowa Cubs. It was the first time the Storm Chasers sold out the park since 2019.

=== Attendance records ===
On March 25, 2019, the Storm Chasers hosted the Kansas City Royals in an exhibition game prior to the start of the 2019 season that drew 9,351 fans, the largest announced attendance in the history of Werner Park. The Storm Chasers defeated the Royals 3-2 on a walkoff sacrifice fly by outfielder D.J. Burt. The largest crowd for a regular-season Storm Chasers game came on July 3, 2024, when Werner Park saw 9,313 fans as the Storm Chasers defeated the Iowa Cubs 7-3 before the team's annual Independence Day fireworks celebration.

== See also ==
- Sports in Omaha
