= Union Omaha =

Professional soccer team in Omaha, Nebraska, U.S.

- Full name: Union Omaha Soccer Club
- Nicknames: The Owls, Los Búhos
- Founded: May 1, 2019; 7 years ago
- Stadium: Morrison Stadium; Omaha, Nebraska, U.S.
- Capacity: 6,000
- Owner: Gary Green
- Head coach: Vincenzo Candela
- League: USL League One
- 2025: USL League One, 5th of 14; Playoffs: Quarter-finals
- Website: unionomaha.com
| Home colors | Away colors |

Union Omaha Soccer Club is an American professional soccer team based in Omaha, Nebraska, United States. Nicknamed the Owls, the team made its debut in USL League One (USL1) in 2020. In the club’s first five seasons, the Owls finished in first place in the league three times and defeated two MLS sides during the 2022 U.S. Open Cup. Along with those achievements, Union Omaha won the league championship in just the second season of the club's existence and again in 2024.

== History ==
In 2019, USL1 awarded a franchise to Alliance Omaha Soccer Holdings to begin play in the 2020 season. The decision to bring the league to Omaha, Nebraska, came as part of the USL's initiative to bring teams to communities without professional soccer.

An addition more than two years in the making finally became a reality in October 2019, when Alliance Omaha Soccer unveiled the team's name, colors and crest design.

Prior to its inaugural season, Union Omaha named former University of Nebraska Omaha head soccer coach Jay Mims the club's first manager. Mims took the Owls to the playoffs in all three of his seasons at the helm and managed to get the club to the League One Finals in both 2020 and 2021. He remained in charge until his resignation on Dec. 16, 2022.

Union Omaha finished the 2020 season in second place and qualified for the USL1 championship game. However, the match was canceled due to an outbreak of COVID-19 within the team's roster.

By defeating the Richmond Kickers 2–0 in the second to last match of the 2021 season, the Owls became the USL League One regular-season champions and clinched the top seed for the playoffs. Union Omaha then finished the season winning their first ever championship, beating defending champion Greenville Triumph SC 3–0 in the final.

Union Omaha made a deep run in the 2022 U.S. Open Cup, entering in the second round and advancing to the quarterfinals as the last remaining third division team in the competition. In April, the Owls defeated Major League Soccer club Chicago Fire FC in a penalty shootout in the third round, becoming the first USL1 team to defeat an MLS team in U.S. Open Cup history. After defeating fellow USL1 side Northern Colorado Hailstorm FC, Omaha played Minnesota United FC of MLS in the Round of 16 and won 2–1. They were the first third division team since Orlando City in 2013 to advance to the U.S. Open Cup quarterfinals. The club's run in the competition ended with a 6–0 defeat to hosts Sporting Kansas City in the quarterfinals; approximately 700 fans traveled from Omaha to attend the match at Children's Mercy Park in Kansas City, Kansas.

After slipping to fifth in the standings and losing in the quarterfinals in 2022, Mims stepped down and the club announced the hiring of Dominic Casciato to take his place. In his first season in charge, Casciato led Union Omaha to 14 consecutive wins to finish the season. The Owls eventually lost in the semifinals of the playoffs, but their 14 straight wins helped them earn the USL League One Players' Shield given out to the team sitting atop the league standings at the end of the regular season.

On Jan. 25, 2024, the club announced their plans to build a dedicated soccer stadium in Downtown Omaha. The team later paused development following the site's unfavorable position and cost. Then, on Nov. 17, 2024, Union Omaha won its second USL League One title, defeating expansion team Spokane Velocity FC 3–0. In front of the largest crowd in USL League One Finals history, the Owls became the first USL League One club to win a second championship. Union Omaha also won their third USL League One Players' Shield in 2024. In November 2025, Union Omaha announced that they had found a new site for their stadium. The $114 million stadium will be located in North Downtown Omaha, Nebraska and is expected to be completed in 2028.

== Honors ==
Four Owls' earned USL League One All-League honors in the club's first season. Out of the four, defender Damia Viader and midfielder Evan Conway made the All-League First Team. Viader finished the season top three at his position in chances created and tackles won. Conway created 16 chances and won the most duels of any player in the league. Goalkeeper Rashid Nuhu and forward Ethan Vanacore-Decker made the All-League Second Team.

Union Omaha saw five players earn All-League honors after winning the championship in 2021. Viader and forward Greg Hurst featured on the All-League First Team while Conway, Nuhu and midfielder Devin Boyce made the All-League Second Team. Hurst led the team with 13 goals, and Nuhu won the League One Golden Glove award given out to the goalkeeper deemed the best in the league.

In 2022, only Nuhu and midfielder JP Scearce earned All-League honors, but both appeared on the All-League First Team. Nuhu won the Golden Glove award for the second straight season and finally the jump to the First Team. Scearce recorded 225 duel wins and led the league in that category.

The Owls bounced back in 2023 by putting more players than any other club on the All-League teams with five. Scearce made a second consecutive appearance on the All-League First Team. Defender Alexis Souahy joined him and defender Dion Acoff, forward Steevan Dos Santos and forward Noe Meza all made the All-League Second Team.

After winning the league in 2024, Union Omaha only had one player make an appearance on the All-League teams. Midfielder Pedro Dolabella won 107 duels and recorded 14 goal contributions to make the All-League First Team.

Both Mims and Casciato also earned honors throughout the club's first five seasons. The league awarded Mims USL League One Coach of the Year honors following the Owls 2021 championship season. Two seasons later, Casciato earned USL League One Coach of the Year honors in his first season in charge of the team. Then, he led the Owls to their second league championship and won the award in back-to-back years.

== Club Icons ==
Mims brought the Owls their first league championship and left a lasting impact as the first manager of a USL1 side to lead his team to victory over an MLS team in the U.S. Open Cup. He did so twice during the 2022 season before resigning at the end of the year.

Casciato made his mark in each of his first two seasons in charge, winning the league and finishing first in the standings at the end of both regular seasons.

== Crest and colors ==
The team developed its name and crest through fan engagement including town halls, workshops, interviews and online polls to reflect the entire Omaha region. In a bid to stay true to the roots of both the state and city, the team announced its new name on Oct. 3, 2019, in a nod to the Union Pacific Railroad.

The great horned owl, a species of owl native to Nebraska, is the prominent focal point of the club's crest. Designed by Matthew Wolff, the three stars to the left of the owl represent the supporters, the city and the purpose of the club.

The Owls' chose the color black as a symbol of power, white to represent new beginnings and lightning yellow as a representation of striking with speed.

=== Kit history ===
Home, away, and third kits.

- Home

| 2020 | 2021–22 | 2023 | 2024 | 2025 | 2026 |

- Away

| 2020 | 2021 | 2022 | 2023 | 2024 | 2025 | 2026 |

=== Sponsorship ===
| Period | Kit manufacturer | Shirt sponsor |
|---|---|---|
| 2020 | Nike | CHI Health (home); Nebraska Medicine (away) |
| 2021–2022 | Nike | XCancer |
| 2023 | Hummel | XCancer |
| 2024–present | Hummel | Centris Federal Credit Union |

== Club ownership ==
Union Omaha is owned and operated by Alliance Sports. Founded in 2008 by Gary Green and Larry Botel, Alliance Sports owns multiple minor league baseball teams. The Owls ownership group now also includes founder and chairman of Carson Group Ron Carson. Carson officially joined the club in August 2024 and is now working with Alliance Sports, the ownership group formerly in charge of the Omaha Storm Chasers, to run the club.

== Stadium ==
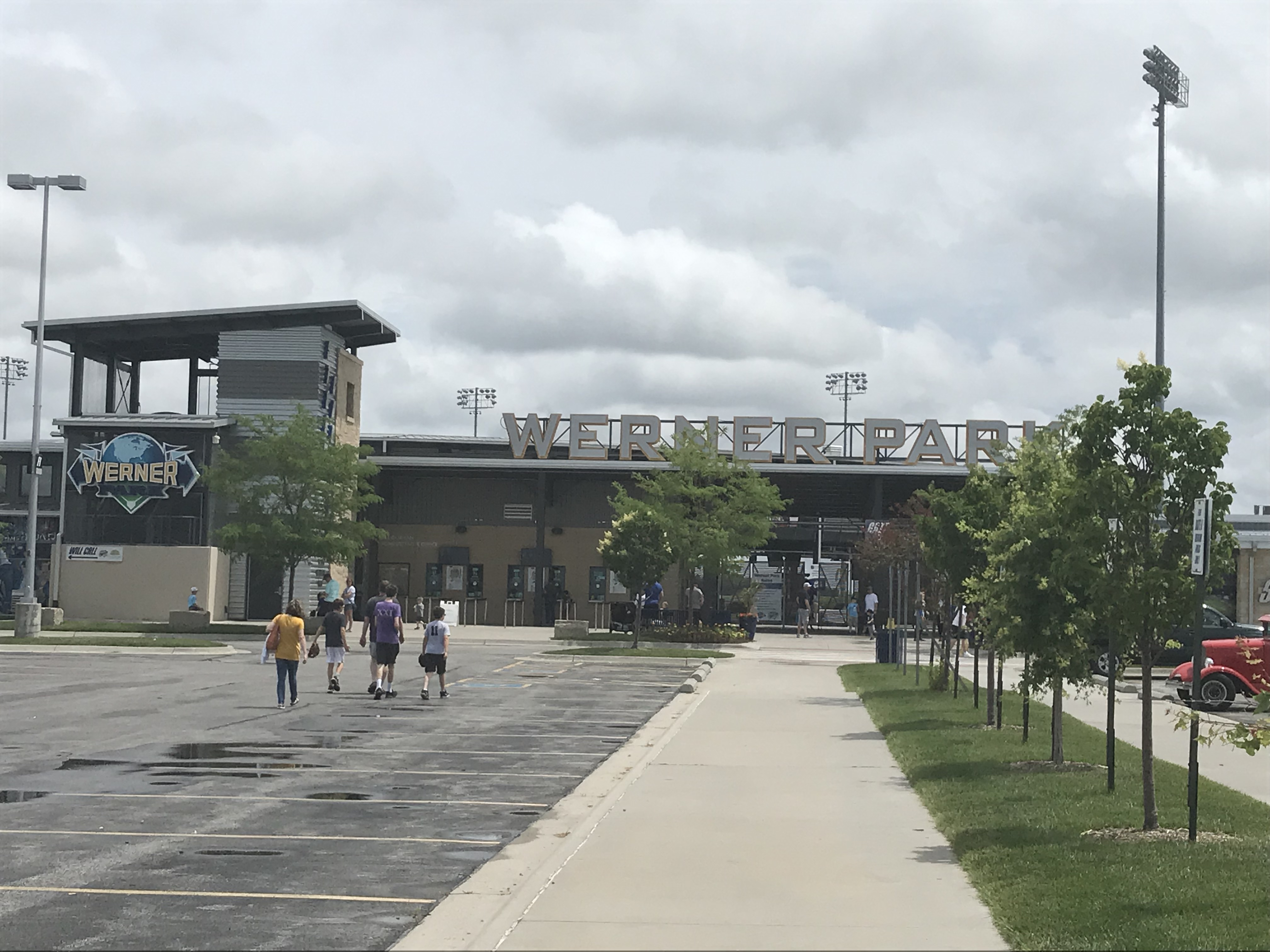
Werner Park Entrance

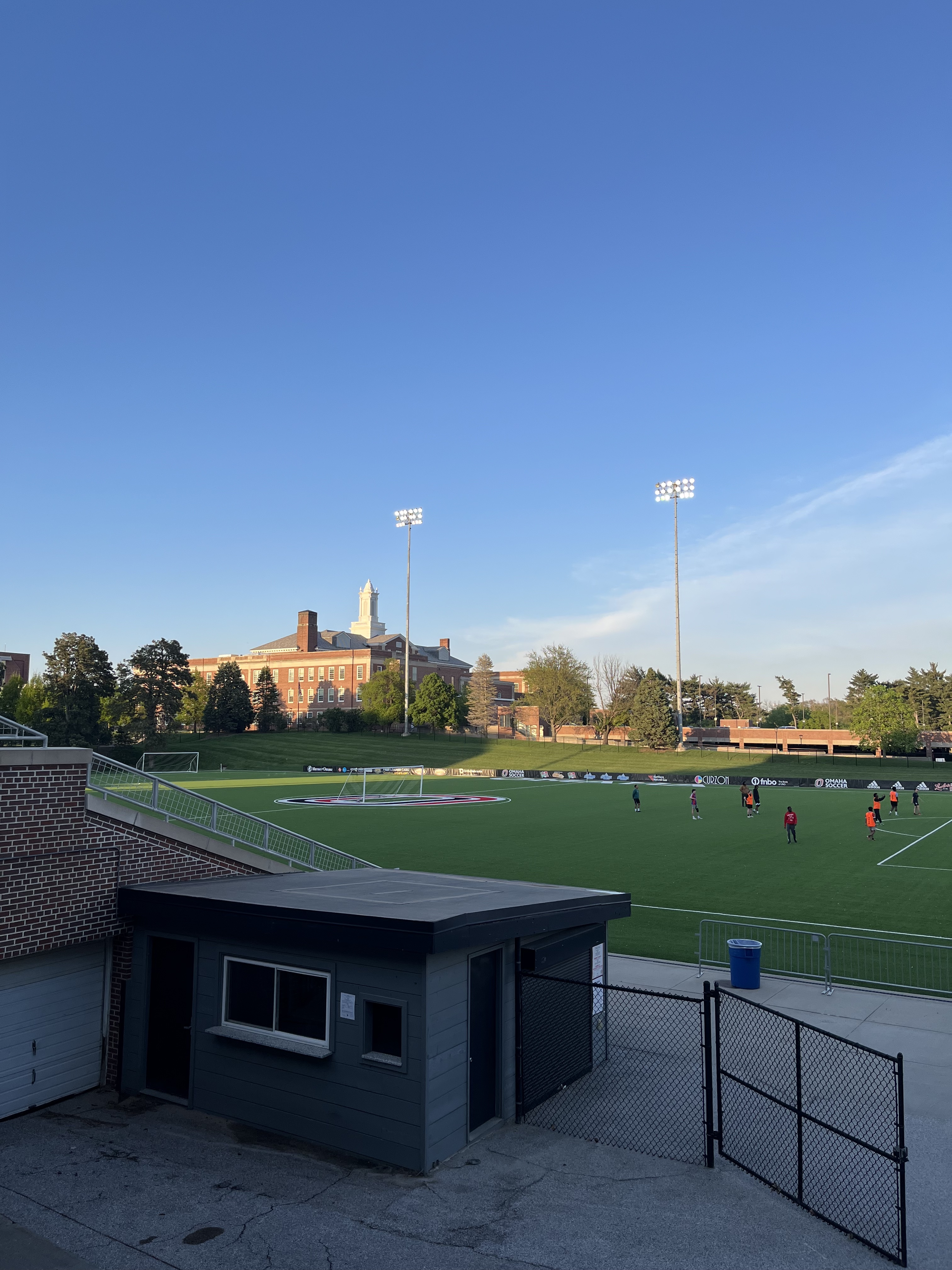
Caniglia Field in 2025. It is located on the University of Nebraska-Omaha's campus and occasionally the site of Union Omaha home games.

From its foundation until 2026, Union Omaha primarily played its home matches at Werner Park, a baseball park located southwest of Omaha in the suburb of Papillion. The Sarpy County owned stadium opened fifteen years ago in 2011 and is shared with the Omaha Storm Chasers, the Triple-A affiliate of the Kansas City Royals. The ballpark cost $36 million to construct and is located near 126th St. and Highway 370, less than three miles (5 km) west of Papillion in unincorporated Sarpy County. During the 2022 U.S. Open Cup, the team hosted Northern Colorado Hailstorm FC at Caniglia Field, located on the campus of the University of Nebraska at Omaha. On October 30, 2025, Union Omaha announced that it would begin playing at Creighton University's Morrison Stadium for the 2026 season.

=== New stadium ===
In January 2024, the team announced plans to build a dedicated 7,000-seat stadium in the Riverfront area of east downtown Omaha along the Missouri River, southeast of the intersection of Abbott Drive and Riverfront Drive near the CHI Health Center and Charles Schwab Field. The stadium, with an estimated cost of $60 million, was originally intended to be part of a planned $300 million housing and entertainment district, and was scheduled to open in spring 2026. In January 2025, team owner Gary Green stated that plans had changed and the Riverfront site was no longer under consideration but also said that the team was still “fully committed to building a downtown professional soccer stadium for Omaha.”

In November 2025, Union Omaha chose a different site in North Downtown Omaha on the west side of Abbott Drive, across from the formerly-chosen site. Construction of the stadium on the 25-acre site, which was formerly owned by the Union Pacific Railroad, is expected to begin in the fall of 2026 and will be completed in time for the beginning of the 2028 season.

== Players ==
=== First team squad ===
As of September 15, 2026

Note: Flags indicate national team as defined under FIFA eligibility rules; some limited exceptions apply. Players may hold more than one non-FIFA nationality.

| No. | Pos. | Nation | Player |
|---|---|---|---|
| 3 | DF | USA | Blake Malone |
| 4 | DF | GHA | Samuel Owusu |
| 5 | DF | USA | Jamie Orson |
| 6 | DF | USA | Sami Guediri |
| 7 | MF | GER | Adrian Billhardt |
| 8 | MF | BRA | Gabriel Cabral |
| 9 | FW | MEX | Pato Botello Faz |
| 14 | DF | USA | Brent Kallman |
| 15 | MF | USA | Brandon Knapp |
| 16 | MF | ENG | Laurence Wootton |
| 17 | FW | USA | Diego Gutierrez |

| No. | Pos. | Nation | Player |
|---|---|---|---|
| 19 | DF | USA | Camron Lawrence |
| 20 | FW | ESP | Sergio Ors Navarro |
| 21 | FW | MEX | Aarón Gómez |
| 22 | FW | GER | Kempes Tekiela |
| 23 | DF | MAR | Younes Boudadi |
| 24 | GK | GHA | Rashid Nuhu |
| 25 | MF | LAO | Theo Klein |
| 27 | DF | SSD | Ryen Jiba |
| 28 | MF | USA | Edrey Cáceres |
| 77 | MF | USA | Allen Gavilanes (on loan from Indy Eleven) |
| 99 | GK | USA | Cole Jensen |

=== Out on loan ===
Note: Flags indicate national team as defined under FIFA eligibility rules; some limited exceptions apply. Players may hold more than one non-FIFA nationality.

| No. | Pos. | Nation | Player |
|---|---|---|---|
| 11 | FW | USA | Dylan Borczak (on loan to FC Tulsa) |

=== Club captains ===
| Years | Name | Nation |
|---|---|---|
| 2020 | Sebastián Contreras | Argentina |
| 2021–2023 | Conor Doyle | United States |
| 2024– | Rashid Nuhu | Ghana |

== Staff ==
=== Current staff ===
Coaching staff
| (Colombia) Vincenzo Candela | Head coach |
| (United States) Lars Eckenrode | Assistant Coach |
| (England) Ollie Richardson | Assistant Coach |
| (England) Luke Baxter | Goalkeeper Coach |
Front office
| (United States) Martie Cordaro | President |
| (United States) Alexis Boulos | General Manager |
| (England) Jamie Henderson | Sporting Director |

== Statistics and records ==
=== Year-by-year ===
As of November 9, 2025

| Season | USL League One | | | | | | | | | Playoffs | US Open Cup | Top Scorer | |
| Season | P | W | D | L | GF | GA | Pts | PPG | Position | Playoffs | US Open Cup | Player | Goals |
|---|---|---|---|---|---|---|---|---|---|---|---|---|---|
| 2020 | 16 | 8 | 5 | 3 | 20 | 15 | 29 | 1.81 | 2nd | F | Cancelled | (United States) Evan Conway | 6 |
| 2021 | 28 | 14 | 9 | 5 | 44 | 22 | 51 | 1.82 | 1st | W | Cancelled | (Scotland) Greg Hurst | 14 |
| 2022 | 30 | 10 | 13 | 7 | 34 | 33 | 43 | 1.43 | 5th | QF | QF | (United States) Noe Meza | 9 |
| 2023 | 32 | 19 | 8 | 5 | 61 | 41 | 65 | 2.03 | 1st | SF | Third Round | (Cape Verde) Steevan Dos Santos | 13 |
| 2024 | 22 | 15 | 3 | 4 | 47 | 24 | 48 | 2.18 | 1st | W | Ro32 | (Brazil) Pedro Dolabella | 11 |
| 2025 | 30 | 13 | 7 | 10 | 51 | 39 | 46 | 1.53 | 5th | QF | Ro32 | (Spain) Sergio Ors | 10 |
| Total | 158 | 79 | 45 | 34 | 257 | 174 | 282 | 1.78 | – | – | – | - | - |

=== Head coaches record ===
As of November 2, 2025

- Includes Regular Season, Playoffs, Jägermeister Cup, U.S. Open Cup. Excludes friendlies.

| Name | Nationality | From | To | P | W | D | L | GF | GA | Win% |
|---|---|---|---|---|---|---|---|---|---|---|
| Jay Mims | United States | May 1, 2019 | December 16, 2022 | 82 | 38 | 27 | 17 | 115 | 82 | 46.34 |
| Dominic Casciato | England | January 17, 2023 | July 8, 2025 | 91 | 49 | 18 | 24 | 160 | 117 | 53.85 |
| Vincenzo Candela | Colombia | July 8, 2025 | Present | 21 | 11 | 6 | 4 | 40 | 20 | 52.38 |

=== Average attendance ===
| Year | Reg. season | Playoffs |
|---|---|---|
| 2020 | 2,500 | – |
| 2021 | 3,354 | 4,414 |
| 2022 | 3,911 | – |
| 2023 | 3,030 | 2,217 |
| 2024 | 3,206 | 3,716 |
| 2025 | 3,043 | |

== Honors ==
- USL League One playoffs
  - Champions: 2021, 2024
- USL League One Regular Season
  - Players' Shield: 2021, 2023, 2024

=== Individual honors ===
| Year | Player | Country | Position | Honor |
|---|---|---|---|---|
| 2020 | Evan Conway | United States | Midfielder | All-League First Team |
| 2020 | Damià Viader | Spain | Defender | All-League First Team |
| 2020 | Ethan Vanacore-Decker | United States | Forward | All-League Second Team; Assists Champion |
| 2020 | Rashid Nuhu | Ghana | Goalkeeper | All-League Second Team |
| 2021 | Damià Viader | Spain | Defender | Defender of the Year; All-League First Team; League Finals MVP |
| 2021 | Rashid Nuhu | Ghana | Goalkeeper | Goalkeeper of the Year; Golden Glove Award; All-League Second Team |
| 2021 | Greg Hurst | Scotland | Forward | All-League First Team |
| 2021 | Devin Boyce | United States | Midfielder | All-League Second Team |
| 2021 | Evan Conway | United States | Forward | All-League Second Team |
| 2022 | Rashid Nuhu | Ghana | Goalkeeper | Golden Glove Award; Goalkeeper of the Year Award; All-League First Team |
| 2022 | JP Scearce | United States | Midfielder | All-League First Team |
| 2023 | Dominic Casciato | England | Coach | Coach of the Year |
| 2023 | JP Scearce | United States | Midfielder | All-League First Team |
| 2023 | Alexis Souahy | Comoros | Defender | All-League First Team |
| 2023 | Steevan Dos Santos | Cape Verde | Forward | All-League Second Team |
| 2023 | Noe Meza | United States | Forward | All-League Second Team |
| 2023 | Dion Acoff | United States | Defender | All-League Second Team |
| 2024 | Dominic Casciato | England | Coach | Coach of the Year |
| 2024 | Pedro Dolabella | Brazil | Midfielder | All-League First Team |
