= 2024 Detroit City FC season =

American soccer team season

Detroit City FC
2024 season
- CEO: Sean Mann
- Manager: Danny Dichio
- Stadium: Keyworth Stadium; Hamtramck, Michigan
- USL Championship: 3rd (Eastern Conference)
- USL Championship Playoffs: First Round
- U.S. Open Cup: Round of 16
- Top goalscorer: League: 10 goals: Maxi Rodriguez; Ben Morris; All: 12 goals: Maxi Rodriguez
- Highest home attendance: Regular season: 7,172 vs Charleston Battery (June 15); Playoffs: 7,183 vs Tampa Bay Rowdies (November 2)
- Lowest home attendance: 5,155 vs North Carolina FC (April 6)
- Average home league attendance: Regular season: 6,261; Playoffs: 7,183
- Biggest win: 0-4 at Miami FC (June 29)
- Biggest defeat: 5-1 at Louisville City FC (May 29)
Home colors	Away colors	Third colors

The 2024 Detroit City FC season was the club's sixth professional season since the club was established in 2012, and the team's third season in the USL Championship. The club finished with their best record since joining the league, going 15W-11D-8L to finish with 56 points, an improvement of 15 points from their 2023 campaign and 2 points and 1 win from their 2022 campaign, their previous best finish in the league. They finished 3rd in the Eastern Conference, falling to the Tampa Bay Rowdies on penalties in the first round of the playoffs in their first home playoff game since joining the league. The season includes milestones when Rhys Williams and Michael Bryant played their 100th games for the club, becoming the 5th and 6th City Centurions of the club, and Matt Sheldon having played his 150th game in the league.

== Kits ==
Home	Away	Alternate	Pride for Ruth Ellis Center	Charity for CHASS Center

== Roster ==
Final 2024 roster

Note: Flags indicate national team as defined under FIFA eligibility rules; some limited exceptions apply. Players may hold more than one non-FIFA nationality.

No.	Pos.	Nation	Player
1	GK	USA	Nate Steinwascher
2	DF	USA	Rhys Williams
3	DF	USA	Alex Villanueva
4	MF	ENG	Ryan Williams
5	DF	IRL	Stephen Carroll
6	MF	USA	James Murphy
7	FW	USA	Victor Bezerra (on loan from Chicago Fire)
8	MF	SEN	Abdoulaye Diop
9	FW	ENG	Ben Morris
11	MF	USA	Connor Rutz
12	MF	USA	Michael Bryant

No.	Pos.	Nation	Player
13	DF	USA	Matt Sheldon
14	MF	USA	Daniel Espeleta
17	DF	CAN	Brett Levis
19	FW	GHA	Elvis Amoh
21	MF	USA	Maxi Rodriguez
22	DF	SOM	Abdi Salim (on loan from Orlando City)
23	FW	ECU	Jeciel Cedeño
27	FW	RSA	Yazeed Matthews
30	DF	USA	Devon Amoo-Mensah
70	MF	CIV	Laurent Kissiedou (on loan from Pardubice)
91	GK	MEX	Carlos Saldaña

1. USL Academy Contract

== Coaching staff ==
Technical staff
Head Coach	(England) Danny Dichio
Assistant Coach	(Canada) Nick Dasovic
Sports Performance Coach	(United States) Dan Trosper
Goalkeeper Coach	(United States) Emerson Lovato

== Transfers ==
For transfers in, dates listed are when Detroit City FC officially signed the players to the roster. Transactions where only the rights to the players are acquired are not listed. For transfers out, dates listed are when Detroit City FC officially removed the players from its roster, not when they signed with another club. If a player later signed with another club, his new club will be noted, but the date listed here remains the one when he was officially removed from the Detroit City FC roster.

=== In ===
No.	Pos.	Player	Transferred from	Fee/notes	Date	Source
10	MF	(Scotland) Ali Coote	(Republic of Ireland) Bohemian F.C.		January 9, 2024	
3	DF	(United States) Alex Villanueva	(United States) Orange County SC		January 10, 2024	
19	FW	(Ghana) Elvis Amoh	(United States) Hartford Athletic		January 11, 2024	
13	DF	(United States) Matthew Sheldon	(United States) Hartford Athletic	Skage Simonsen sent to Hartford Athletic as part of the exchange.	January 24, 2024	
6	MF	(United States) James Murphy	(United States) Monterey Bay FC		January 25, 2024	
91	GK	(Mexico) Carlos Saldaña	(United States) Sacramento Republic FC		January 30, 2024	
4	MF	(England) Ryan Williams	(Sweden) AFC Eskilstuna		March 4, 2024	
14	MF	(United States) Daniel Espeleta	(Costa Rica) Municipal Grecia		March 5, 2024	
7	FW	(United States) Victor Bezerra	(United States) Chicago Fire FC	Loan	March 19, 2024	
22	DF	(Somalia) Abdi Salim	(United States) Orlando City SC	Loan	July 15, 2024	
23	FW	(Ecuador) Jeciel Cedeño	(United States) Oakland Roots SC		July 29, 2024	
70	MF	(Ivory Coast) Laurent Kissiedou	(Czech Republic) FK Pardubice	Loan	August 20, 2024	

=== Out ===
No.	Pos.	Player	Transferred to	Fee/notes	Date	Source
7	FW	(Norway) Skage Simonsen	(United States) Hartford Athletic	Matt Sheldon received from Hartford Athletic as part of the exchange.	January 24, 2024	
10	FW	(Scotland) Ali Coote	(Republic of Ireland) Shelbourne FC		June 18, 2024	
24	MF	(United States) Dominic Gasso	(United States) Huntsville City FC	Loan	August 3, 2024	

== Competitions ==
=== Preseason and friendlies ===
February 10 1	Grand Canyon Antelopes	0–2	Detroit City FC	Tucson, Arizona
				Stadium: Kino Sports Complex

February 13 2	New Mexico United	1–0	Detroit City FC	Tucson, Arizona
				Stadium: Kino Sports Complex

February 15 3	El Paso Locomotive FC	0–1	Detroit City FC	Tucson, Arizona
				Stadium: Kino Sports Complex

February 22 4	Columbus Crew 2	1–2	Detroit City FC	Columbus, Ohio
				Stadium: Historic Crew Stadium

February 29 5	Indy Eleven	3–1	Detroit City FC	Indianapolis, Indiana
				Stadium: Grand Park

March 8 6	Oakland Golden Grizzlies	2–4	Detroit City FC	Rochester, Michigan
				Stadium: Oakland University Dome

June 22 7	Detroit City FC (United States)	1–0	(Mexico) UNAM Pumas	Hamtramck, Michigan
	Salim 54'			Stadium: Keyworth Stadium

=== USL Championship ===
==== Eastern Conference ====
Pos	Team	Pld	W	L	T	GF	GA	GD	Pts	Qualification
1	Louisville City FC (S)	34	24	6	4	86	43	+43	76	Playoffs
2	Charleston Battery	34	18	6	10	68	35	+33	64	Playoffs
3	Detroit City FC	34	15	8	11	46	32	+14	56	Playoffs
4	Indy Eleven	34	14	11	9	49	50	−1	51	Playoffs
5	Rhode Island FC	34	12	7	15	56	41	+15	51	Playoffs

Source: USL Championship Standings
Rules for classification: 1) head-to-head points; 2) head-to-head goal differential; 3) points-per game within conference; 4) total wins; 5) total goal differential; 6) total goals scored; 7) points earned against top four Conference finishers; 8) disciplinary points; 9) coin toss or drawing of lots
(S) Players' Shield winner

Overall								Home						Away					
Pld	W	D	L	GF	GA	GD	Pts	W	D	L	GF	GA	GD	W	D	L	GF	GA	GD
34	15	11	8	46	32	+14	56	7	6	4	19	12	+7	8	5	4	27	20	+7

Source: Match reports

==== Matches ====
On December 18, 2024, the USL Championship released the schedule for all 24 teams.

March 16 1	Colorado Springs Switchbacks FC	1–2	Detroit City FC	Colorado Springs, Colorado
8:00 pm EDT	Santos (yellow card) 22' (yellow-red card) 60'; Echevarria (yellow card) 33'; Mahoney 47'; Huerman (yellow card) 87'	Report	Amoh 11'; Levis (yellow card) 45+2'; Steinwascher (yellow card) 84'; Rutz 89'	Stadium: Weidner Field; Attendance: 6,174; Referee: Elijio Arreguin

March 23 2	Detroit City FC	2–1	Loudoun United FC	Hamtramck, Michigan
4:00 pm EDT	Amoh (yellow card) 9'; Rodriguez (yellow card) 16' (goal) 71'; Diop 56'; Murphy (yellow card) 63'	Report	Leggett 14'; Hughes (yellow card) 90+3'	Stadium: Keyworth Stadium; Attendance: 6,231; Referee: Adam Kilpatrick

March 30 3	Indy Eleven	1–2	Detroit City FC	Indianapolis, Indiana
7:00 pm EDT	Boudadi (yellow card) 15'; Guenzatti 15'; Diz Pe (yellow card) 87'	Report	Diop (yellow card) 42'; Coote 55'; Rodriguez 87'; Carroll (yellow card) 87'	Stadium: Michael A. Carroll Stadium; Referee: Velimir Stefanovic

April 6 4	Detroit City FC	1–0	North Carolina FC	Hamtramck, Michigan
2:00 pm EDT	Blanco 9' (o.g.); Diop (yellow card) 26'; Murphy (yellow card) 66'; Levis (yellow card) 77'; Amoo-Mensah (yellow card) 86'	Report	Rafael Mentzingen (yellow card) 25'; Batista (yellow card) 75'; Craig (yellow card) 83'; Malou (yellow card) 89'	Stadium: Keyworth Stadium; Attendance: 5,155; Referee: Nabil Bensalah

April 20 5	Detroit City FC	3–1	Oakland Roots SC	Hamtramck, Michigan
4:00 pm EDT	Morris 8'; Bryant (yellow card) 19'; Diop (yellow card) 20'; Rodriguez 27' (pen.); Bezerra 51'	Report	Diaz (yellow card) 25'; Margvelashvili (yellow card) 39' (yellow-red card) 60'; Rasmussen 57'	Stadium: Keyworth Stadium; Attendance: 5,620; Referee: Olvin Oliva

April 27 6	Pittsburgh Riverhounds SC	2–0	Detroit City FC	Pittsburgh, Pennsylvania
7:00 pm EDT	Hogan 20'; Griffin 35' (pen.) (yellow card) 40'; Blackstock (yellow card) 45+1'; Etou (yellow card) 49'; Suber (yellow card) 90'	Report	Amoo-Mensah (yellow card) 33'; Diop (yellow card) 75'; Matthews (yellow card) 86'; Sheldon (yellow card) 90+4'; Carroll (red card) 90+6'	Stadium: Highmark Stadium; Attendance: 6,099; Referee: Kyle Johnston

May 4 7	Loudoun United FC	0–0	Detroit City FC	Leesburg, Virginia
7:00 pm EDT	Skundrich (yellow card) 30'; ElMedkhar (yellow card) 78'	Report	Villanueva (yellow card) 35'; Diop (yellow card) 59'	Stadium: Segra Field; Attendance: 3,017; Referee: Lorenzo Hernandez

May 11 8	Detroit City FC	1–1	Phoenix Rising FC	Hamtramck, Michigan
5:00 pm EDT	Morris 9'; Rodriguez (yellow card) 38'	Report	Doratiotto 49'; Torres (yellow card) 65'; Hernández (yellow card) 81'	Stadium: Keyworth Stadium; Attendance: 6,538; Referee: Trevor Wiseman

May 29 9	Louisville City FC	5–1	Detroit City FC	Louisville, Kentucky
7:30 pm EDT	Ordoñez (yellow card) 20' (goal) 42'; Wynder (yellow card) 38'; Perez 48' (yellow card) 57'; Harris 61', 84' (pen.); Morris 74'; Cruz (yellow card) 80'	Report	Sheldon 34'; Murphy (yellow card) 40'; Rutz (yellow card) 72'	Stadium: Lynn Family Stadium; Attendance: 10,385; Referee: Matthew Corrigan

June 1 10	Orange County SC	3–2	Detroit City FC	Irvine, California
10:00 pm EDT	Amang 40' (yellow card) 90+5'; Scott (yellow card) 56' (goal) 57'; Fox (yellow card) 65'; Jamison 78'	Report	Carroll (yellow card) 8' (goal) 19'; Amoo-Mensah (yellow card) 14'; Diop 67' (pen.); Rutz (yellow card) 90+3'	Stadium: Championship Soccer Stadium; Attendance: 3,537; Referee: Nabil Bensalah

June 8 11	Rhode Island FC	0–2	Detroit City FC	Smithfield, Rhode Island
7:30 pm EDT		Report	Rodriguez 36'; Carroll (yellow card) 61'; Bezerra 64'	Stadium: Beirne Stadium; Attendance: 4,108; Referee: Elton García

June 15 12	Detroit City FC	2–0	Charleston Battery	Hamtramck, Michigan
4:00 pm EDT	Amoo-Mensah (yellow card) 55'; Ry. Williams (yellow card) 72'; Rodriguez 86' (pen.); Murphy (yellow card) 90+2'; Amoh 90+4'	Report	Markanich (yellow card) 33'; Gutierrez (yellow card) 40'; Pirmann (yellow card) 42'; Ycaza (yellow card) 52'; Allan (yellow card) 69'; Segbers (yellow card) 88'	Stadium: Keyworth Stadium; Attendance: 7,172; Referee: Brandon Stevis

June 26 13	Detroit City FC	1–2	Birmingham Legion FC	Hamtramck Stadium
7:00 pm EDT	Rh. Williams 39'; Murphy (yellow card) 42'; Sheldon (yellow card) 70'	Report	Pasher (yellow card) 64'; Dodson 82'; Kavita (yellow card) 86' (goal) 88'	Stadium: Keyworth Stadium; Attendance: 6,244; Referee: Abdou Ndiaye

June 29 14	Miami FC	0–4	Detroit City FC	Miami, Florida
7:00 pm EDT	Botta (yellow card) 6'; Palacios (yellow card) 50' (yellow-red card) 88'; Booth (yellow card) 53'; López (yellow card) 87'	Report	Rh. Williams 44' (yellow card) 88'; Bryant 51'; Carroll (yellow card) 65'; Rodriguez 72', 90+3'	Stadium: FIU Stadium; Attendance: 1,077; Referee: Alyssa Nichols

July 6 15	Detroit City FC	1–1	Tampa Bay Rowdies	Hamtramck, Michigan
7:00 pm EDT	Murphy (yellow card) 41'; Diop (yellow card) 41' (yellow-red card) 59'; Dichio (yellow card) 60'; Amoh 71'; Rodriguez (yellow card) 75'	Report	Arteaga (yellow card) 45+4'; Kleemann (yellow card) 51'; Moon 90+4'	Stadium: Keyworth Stadium; Attendance: 6,403; Referee: Muhammad Hassan

July 13 16	Detroit City FC	0–1	Memphis 901 FC	Hamtramck, Michigan
7:00 pm EDT	Murphy (yellow card) 62'	Report	Luiz Fernando (yellow card) 17'; Cissoko (yellow card) 20'; Borczak (yellow card) 45+2'; Turci (yellow card) 67'; Lapa 86'; Marlon (yellow card) 90'	Stadium: Keyworth Stadium; Attendance: 6,122; Referee: Ricardo Fierro

July 19 17	North Carolina FC	1–1	Detroit City FC	Cary, North Carolina
7:30 pm EDT	Armstrong (red card) 5'; Anderson (yellow card) 56'; Conway 67'; Servania (yellow card) 86'; Batista (yellow card) 90+2'	Report	Bryant (yellow card) 10'; Amoo-Mensah (yellow card) 26'; Bezerra 90+3'; Matthews (red card) 90+4'	Stadium: WakeMed Soccer Park; Attendance: 2,054; Referee: John Matto

July 27 18	Detroit City FC	0–1	Sacramento Republic FC	Hamtramck, Michigan
7:00 pm EDT	Sheldon (yellow card) 26'	Report	Cicerone 84'	Stadium: Keyworth Stadium; Attendance: 6,039; Referee: Joshua Encarnación

July 31 19	Hartford Athletic	1–0	Detroit City FC	Hartford, Connecticut
7:30 pm EDT	Beckford 23'; Barrera (yellow card) 65'; Akpunonu (yellow card) 77'; Mamadou (yellow card) 90'; Hairston (yellow card) 90+1'	Report	Rh. Williams (yellow card) 90+1'	Stadium: Trinity Health Stadium; Referee: Matthew Corrigan

August 3 20	Detroit City FC	1–1	Rhode Island FC	Hamtramck, Michigan
7:00 pm EDT	Morris 77'	Report	Williams (yellow card) 46'; Herivaux (yellow card) 57'; Kwizera (yellow card) 72'; Holstad 90+3'	Stadium: Keyworth Stadium; Attendance: 6,862; Referee: Lorenzo Hernandez

August 7 21	Detroit City FC	0–0	Pittsburgh Riverhounds SC	Hamtramck, Michigan
7:00 pm EDT	Cedeño (yellow card) 16'; Amoh (yellow card) 32'; Ry. Williams (yellow card) 45+1'; Espeleta (yellow card) 85'	Report	Hogan (yellow card) 63'	Stadium: Keyworth Stadium; Attendance: 7,166; Referee: Brandon Stevis

August 10 22	Las Vegas Lights FC	1–1	Detroit City FC	Las Vegas, Nevada
10:30 pm EDT	Bennett (yellow card) 56' (goal) 66'	Report	Morris 39'; Murphy (yellow card) 54'	Stadium: Cashman Field; Attendance: 1,990; Referee: Gerald Flores

August 16 23	Birmingham Legion FC	0–1	Detroit City FC	Birmingham, Alabama
8:00 pm EDT	Pinho (yellow card) 90+3'	Report	Levis 32'; Sheldon (yellow card) 75'	Stadium: Protective Stadium; Attendance: 4,123; Referee: Calin Radosav

August 21 24	Tampa Bay Rowdies	2–3	Detroit City FC	St. Petersburg, Florida
7:30 pm EDT	Bubb (yellow card) 27' (goal) 36'; Arteaga (yellow card) 45+6' (goal) 90+3'; Fernandes (yellow card) 82'	Report	Amoo-Mensah 3' (yellow card) 42'; Rutz (yellow card) 23'; Rh. Williams (yellow card) 29'; Carroll (yellow card) 44'; Morris 58', 74'; Bryant (yellow card) 81'	Stadium: Al Lang Stadium; Attendance: 3,159; Referee: Ricardo Montero

August 24 25	Detroit City FC	0–1	FC Tulsa	Hamtramck, Michigan
7:00 pm EDT	Diop (yellow card) 70'	Report	Bibout 14' (yellow card) 54'; St. Clair (yellow card) 22' (yellow-red card) 66'; Diallo (yellow card) 27'; Pacheco (yellow card) 90+7'	Stadium: Keyworth Stadium; Attendance: 6,124; Referee: Alejo Calume

August 31 26	Detroit City FC	1–1	Hartford Athletic	Hamtramck, Michigan
7:00 pm EDT	Morris 21'; Amoo-Mensah (yellow card) 24'; Murphy (yellow card) 54'; Bryant (yellow card) 75'	Report	Dieng 17'; Samadia (yellow card) 42'; Hodge (yellow card) 65'; Farrell (yellow card) 88'	Stadium: Keyworth Stadium; Attendance: 6,047; Referee: Servando Berna Rico

September 7 27	El Paso Locomotive FC	0–0	Detroit City FC	El Paso, Texas
9:00 pm EDT	Lyons (yellow card) 85'	Report	Murphy (yellow card) 22'; Villanueva (yellow card) 82'	Stadium: Southwest University Park; Attendance: 5,764; Referee: Luis Arroyo

September 14 28	Detroit City FC	1–0	New Mexico United	Hamtramck, Michigan
7:00 pm EDT	Rodriguez 20' (pen.); Sheldon (yellow card) 90+6'	Report	Shakes (yellow card) 89'; Quill (yellow card) 90+7'	Stadium: Keyworth Stadium; Attendance: 5,738; Referee: Eric Tattersall

September 21 29	Detroit City FC	2–1	Louisville City FC	Hamtramck, Michigan
3:00 pm EDT	Rodriguez 17' (yellow card) 62'; Rh. Williams (yellow card) 37'; Rutz 67'	Report	Goodrum (yellow card) 33' (yellow-red card) 49'; Totsch 45+5' (pen.); Perez (yellow card) 51'; Ordoñez (yellow card) 73'	Stadium: Keyworth Stadium; Attendance: 6,173; Referee: Ricardo Fierro

September 28 30	Monterey Bay FC	0–2	Detroit City FC	Seaside, California
10:00 pm EDT	Robinson (yellow card) 38'; Gutierrez (yellow card) 70'; Dieter (yellow card) 80'	Report	Diop (yellow card) 31'; Morris 37'; Rutz 86'	Stadium: Cardinale Stadium; Attendance: 4,742; Referee: Abdou Ndiaye

October 5 31	Charleston Battery	2–2	Detroit City FC	Mount Pleasant, South Carolina
4:00 pm EDT	Torres (yellow card) 27' (goal) 84'; Markanich 73' (pen.); Molloy (yellow card) 82'	Report	Murphy (yellow card) 33'; Villanueva (yellow card) 36'; Carroll 49' (yellow card) 59'; Rutz (red card) 57'; Amoo-Mensah (yellow card) 72'; Rodriguez (yellow card) 90'; Kissiedou 90+3'	Stadium: Patriots Point Soccer Complex; Attendance: 4,610; Referee: Greg Dopka

October 12 32	Detroit City FC	0–0	Indy Eleven	Hamtramck, Michigan
4:00 pm EDT	Murphy (yellow card) 39'; Diop (yellow card) 69'; Rodriguez (yellow card) 78'	Report	Soumaoro (yellow card) 57'; Musa (yellow card) 69'	Stadium: Keyworth Stadium; Attendance: 6,240; Referee: Gerald Flores

October 19 33	Detroit City FC	3–0	Miami FC	Hamtramck, Michigan
4:00 pm EDT	Rh. Williams 39'; Kissiedou 75'; Steinwascher 90+5' (pen.)	Report	Rodriguez (yellow card) 90+4'	Stadium: Keyworth Stadium; Attendance: 6,564; Referee: Servando Berna Rico

October 26 34	San Antonio FC	1–4	Detroit City FC	San Antonio, Texas
8:30 pm EDT	Burks (yellow card) 27'; Manley (red card) 45+1'; Gomez (yellow card) 45+4'; Mbongue 57'; Haakenson (yellow card) 76'	Report	Rodriguez 28'; Ry. Williams 45+3'; Morris 54' 65'; Amoo-Mensah (yellow card) 71'	Stadium: Toyota Field; Attendance: 7,066; Referee: John Griggs

==== Playoffs ====
Detroit City officially qualified for the playoffs on October 12, following their 0-0 draw with Indy Eleven. The team earned their first home playoff game since joining USL Championship with their victory over Miami FC on October 19, and sealed third place in the Eastern Conference with a 4-1 win against San Antonio in the season finale.

November 2 Eastern Quarterfinal	Detroit City FC	1–1 (1–3 p)	Tampa Bay Rowdies	Hamtramck, Michigan
7:00 pm EDT	Rodriguez (yellow card) 19'; Moon 49' (o.g.); Kissiedou (yellow card) 52'; Amoo-Mensah (yellow card) 56'; Bryant (yellow card) 91'; Carroll (yellow card) 118'; Murphy (yellow card) 118'	Report	Jennings 19'; Bodily (yellow card) 41'; Niyongabire (yellow card) 78'; Doherty (yellow card) 116'	Stadium: Keyworth Stadium; Attendance: 7,183; Referee: Sergii Demianchuk
	Penalties
	Rodriguez (penalty missed); Murphy (penalty missed); Morris (penalty scored); Amoh (penalty missed)		(penalty missed) Arteaga; (penalty missed) Pérez; (penalty scored) Munjoma; (penalty scored) Doherty; (penalty scored) Hilton

=== U.S. Open Cup ===
As a USL Championship club that finished below the top eight in the table in 2023, Detroit City FC entered the competition in the third round.

April 16 Third Round	Detroit City FC (Michigan)	1–0	Michigan Stars FC	Hamtramck, Michigan
7:00 pm EDT	Saldaña (yellow card) 19'; Rodriguez (yellow card) 43' (goal) 90+3'; Levis (yellow card) 88' (yellow-red card) 90+7'	Report	Stripling (yellow card) 44'; Lellouch (yellow card) 56'; Olson (yellow card) 63' (yellow-red card) 78'; Meram (yellow card) 79'; Chelbaud (yellow card) 90+9'	Stadium: Keyworth Stadium; Referee: Filip Dujic

May 7 Round of 32	Houston Dynamo FC (Texas)	3–3 (9–10 p)	(Michigan) Detroit City FC	Houston, Texas
8:00 pm EDT	Dorsey 6'; Blessing 31'; Carrasquilla 77'	Report	Williams 41'; Matthews 75'; Rodriguez 83'	Stadium: Shell Energy Stadium; Attendance: 7,540; Referee: Claudiu Badea
	Penalties
	Bassi (penalty scored); Kowalczyk (penalty scored); Carrasquilla (penalty scored); Greguš (penalty scored); Ibrahim (penalty missed); Sviatchenko (penalty scored); Bartlow (penalty scored); Dorsey (penalty scored); Schmitt (penalty scored); Artur (penalty scored); Tarbell (penalty missed)		(penalty scored) Matthews; (penalty scored) Villanueva; (penalty missed) Morris; (penalty scored) Murphy; (penalty scored) Bryant; (penalty scored) Gasso; (penalty scored) Espeleta; (penalty scored) Amoo-Mensah; (penalty scored) Rutz; (penalty scored) Carroll; (penalty scored) Saldaña

May 22 Round of 16	Indy Eleven (Indiana)	3–0	(Michigan) Detroit City FC	Indianapolis, Indiana
7:00 pm EDT	Ofeimu (yellow card) 7' (goal) 36'; Carroll 14' (o.g.); Williams 33'; Blake (yellow card) 65'; Schneider (yellow card) 90+1'	Report	Amoo-Mensah (yellow card) 61'	Stadium: Michael A. Carroll Stadium; Referee: Yosuke Araki

== Statistics ==
No.	Pos	Nat	Player	Total		USL		USL Playoffs		U.S. Open Cup	
No.	Pos	Nat	Player	Apps	Goals	Apps	Goals	Apps	Goals	Apps	Goals
Goalkeepers
1	GK	(United States) USA	Nate Steinwascher	23	1	22	1	1	0	0	0
91	GK	(Mexico) MEX	Carlos Saldaña	15	0	12	0	0	0	3	0
Defenders
2	DF	(United States) USA	Rhys Williams	32	3	30	3	1	0	1	0
3	DF	(United States) USA	Alex Villanueva	38	0	34	0	1	0	3	0
5	DF	(Republic of Ireland) IRL	Stephen Carroll	36	2	32	2	1	0	3	0
13	DF	(United States) USA	Matthew Sheldon	33	1	29	1	1	0	3	0
17	DF	(Canada) CAN	Brett Levis	20	1	17	1	1	0	2	0
22	DF	(Somalia) SOM	Abdi Salim	3	0	3	0	0	0	0	0
30	DF	(United States) USA	Devon Amoo-Mensah	38	1	34	1	1	0	3	0
Midfielders
4	MF	(England) ENG	Ryan Williams	25	2	22	1	1	0	2	1
6	MF	(United States) USA	James Murphy	36	0	32	0	1	0	3	0
8	MF	(Senegal) SEN	Abdoulaye Diop	33	2	30	2	0	0	3	0
10	MF	(Scotland) SCO	Ali Coote	11	1	9	1	0	0	2	0
12	MF	(United States) USA	Michael Bryant	37	1	33	1	1	0	3	0
14	MF	(United States) USA	Daniel Espeleta	14	0	11	0	0	0	3	0
21	MF	(United States) USA	Maxi Rodriguez	37	12	33	10	1	0	3	2
24	MF	(United States) USA	Dominic Gasso	7	0	5	0	0	0	2	0
70	MF	(Ivory Coast) CIV	Laurent Kissiedou	13	2	10	2	1	0	2	0
Forwards
7	FW	(United States) USA	Victor Bezerra	21	3	18	3	0	0	3	0
9	FW	(England) ENG	Ben Morris	38	10	34	10	1	0	3	0
11	FW	(United States) USA	Connor Rutz	24	3	22	3	1	0	1	0
19	FW	(Ghana) GHA	Elvis Amoh	26	3	25	3	1	0	0	0
23	FW	(Ecuador) ECU	Jeciel Cedeño	12	0	12	0	0	0	0	0
27	FW	(South Africa) RSA	Yazeed Matthews	22	1	19	0	0	0	3	1

Last updated: November 2, 2024.

=== Top scorers ===
Rank	Position	Number	Name	USL	USL Playoffs	U.S. Open Cup	Total
1	MF	21	Maxi Rodriguez	10	0	2	12
2	FW	9	Ben Morris	10	0	0	10
3	DF	2	Rhys Williams	3	0	0	3
3	FW	7	Victor Bezerra	3	0	0	3
3	FW	11	Connor Rutz	3	0	0	3
3	FW	19	Elvis Amoh	3	0	0	3
7	MF	4	Ryan Williams	1	0	1	2
7	DF	5	Stephen Carroll	2	0	0	2
7	MF	8	Abdoulaye Diop	2	0	0	2
7	MF	70	Laurent Kissiedou	2	0	0	2
11	GK	1	Nate Steinwascher	1	0	0	1
11	MF	10	Ali Coote	1	0	0	1
11	DF	12	Michael Bryant	1	0	0	1
11	DF	13	Matthew Sheldon	1	0	0	1
11	DF	17	Brett Levis	1	0	0	1
11	FW	27	Yazeed Matthews	0	0	1	1
11	DF	30	Devon Amoo-Mensah	1	0	0	1

Last updated: November 2, 2024.
