= 2022 Detroit City FC season =

American soccer team season

Detroit City FC
2022 season
- CEO: Sean Mann
- Manager: Trevor James
- Stadium: Keyworth Stadium; Hamtramck, Michigan
- USL Championship: 7th (Eastern Conference)
- U.S. Open Cup: Round of 32
- Top goalscorer: 9 goals: Maxi Rodriguez
- Highest home attendance: 7,537 v. MIA (10/8)
- Lowest home attendance: 4,157 v. MEM (4/2)
- Average home league attendance: 6,118
- Biggest win: ATL 0–4 DET (4/9)
- Biggest defeat: TUL 3–1 DET (5/7); DET 0–2 SAC (6/11); MEM 2–0 DET (6/25)
Home colors	Away colors	Charity colors

The 2022 Detroit City FC season was the club's fourth professional season since the club was established in 2012. It is also the team's first season in the USL Championship.

== Kits ==
Home	Away	Charity for Hamtramck Historical Museum	Charity for the Special Olympics

== Roster ==
As of April 18, 2022

No.	Name	Nationality	Position	Date of birth (age)	Previous club
1	Nate Steinwascher	United States	GK	February 15, 1993 (age 33)	(Sweden) Grythyttans IF
2	Rhys Williams	United States	DF	August 9, 1995 (age 31)	(United States) Stumptown AC
5	Stephen Carroll	Ireland	DF	November 30, 1993 (age 32)	(United States) Davenport University
6	Brad Dunwell	United States	MF	December 31, 1996 (age 29)	(United States) Oklahoma City Energy FC
7	Billy Forbes	Turks and Caicos Islands	FW	December 30, 1990 (age 35)	(United States) Miami FC
8	Abdoulaye Diop	Senegal	MF	September 17, 1999 (age 27)	(United States) Atlanta United 2
9	Francis Atuahene	Ghana	FW	June 8, 1996 (age 30)	(United States) Memphis 901 FC
11	Connor Rutz	United States	FW	April 9, 1997 (age 29)	(United States) Saginaw Valley State University
12	Michael Bryant	United States	MF	April 2, 1995 (age 31)	(United States) California United Strikers
13	Ryan Shellow	United States	GK	October 10, 1997 (age 29)	(United States) FC Tucson
15	Matt Lewis	United States	DF	August 1, 1996 (age 30)	(United States) El Paso Locomotive
17	Benedek Tanyi	Hungary	MF	January 19, 2001 (age 25)	(United States) Grosse Ile Red Devils
19	Pato Botello Faz	Mexico	FW	September 8, 1996 (age 30)	(United States) Tormenta FC
20	Deklan Wynne	New Zealand	DF	March 20, 1995 (age 31)	(United States) Phoenix Rising FC
21	Maxi Rodriguez	United States	MF	August 9, 1995 (age 31)	(United States) Richmond Kickers
29	Antoine Hoppenot	France; United States	FW	November 23, 1990 (age 35)	(United States) Louisville City
30	Devon Amoo-Mensah	United States	MF	November 27, 1995 (age 30)	(United States) Michigan Stars FC
47	Barnabas Tanyi	Hungary	MF	January 23, 2003 (age 23)	(United States) Detroit City FC U23

== Coaching staff ==
As of April 11, 2022

Technical staff
Head coach/General manager	(England) Trevor James
Assistant/Goalkeeping coach	(United States) Eric Perilla

== Transfers ==
For transfers in, dates listed are when Detroit City FC officially signed the players to the roster. Transactions where only the rights to the players are acquired are not listed. For transfers out, dates listed are when Detroit City FC officially removed the players from its roster, not when they signed with another club. If a player later signed with another club, his new club will be noted, but the date listed here remains the one when he was officially removed from the Detroit City FC roster.

=== In ===
No.	Pos.	Player	Transferred from	Fee/notes	Date	Source
8	MF	(Senegal) Abdoulaye Diop	(United States) Atlanta United 2		January 12, 2022	
2	DF	(United States) Rhys Williams	(United States) Stumptown AC		January 18, 2022	
30	MF	(United States) Devon Amoo-Mensah	(United States) Michigan Stars		January 19, 2022	
6	MF	(United States) Brad Dunwell	(United States) Oklahoma City Energy		January 21, 2022	
20	DF	(New Zealand) Deklan Wynne	(United States) Phoenix Rising		January 28, 2022	
29	MF	(France) Antoine Hoppenot	(United States) Louisville City		February 7, 2022	
12	MF	(United States) Michael Bryant	(United States) Cal United Strikers		February 11, 2022	
7	FW	(Turks and Caicos Islands) Billy Forbes	(United States) Miami FC		March 2, 2022	
9	FW	(Ghana) Francis Atuahene	(United States) Memphis 901 FC		March 3, 2022	
13	GK	(United States) Ryan Shellow	(United States) FC Tucson		March 11, 2022	

== Competitions ==
=== USL Championship ===
==== Eastern Conference ====
Pos	Team	Pld	W	L	T	GF	GA	GD	Pts	Qualification
5	Pittsburgh Riverhounds SC	34	16	9	9	50	38	+12	57	Playoffs
6	Miami FC	34	15	9	10	47	32	+15	55	Playoffs
7	Detroit City FC	34	14	8	12	44	30	+14	54	Playoffs
8	FC Tulsa	34	12	16	6	48	58	−10	42	
9	Indy Eleven	34	12	17	5	41	55	−14	41	

Source: USL Championship Standings
Rules for classification: 1) head-to-head points; 2) head-to-head goal differential; 3) points-per game within conference; 4) total wins; 5) total goal differential; 6) total goals scored; 7) points earned against top four Conference finishers; 8) disciplinary points; 9) coin toss or drawing of lots

Overall								Home						Away					
Pld	W	D	L	GF	GA	GD	Pts	W	D	L	GF	GA	GD	W	D	L	GF	GA	GD
34	14	12	8	25	3	+22	54	6	8	3	21	2	+19	8	4	5	4	1	+3

Source: Match reports

==== Matches ====
March 12 1	San Antonio FC	1–0	Detroit City FC	San Antonio, Texas
7:30 PM CST	Abu (yellow card) 23'; Manley (yellow card) 26'; Garcia 68'; Dhillon (yellow card) 84'	Report	Hoppenot (yellow card) 10'; Dunwell (yellow card) 45'; Bryant (yellow card) 90+3'; Amoo-Mensah (yellow card) 90+5'	Stadium: Toyota Field; Attendance: 6,033; Referee: Elvis Osmanovic

March 19 2	Detroit City FC	1–0	Charleston Battery	Hamtramck, Michigan
4:00 PM EST	Hoppenot 50'	Report	Apodaca (yellow card) 6'; Sheldon (yellow card) 38'; Cichero (yellow card) 84'	Stadium: Keyworth Stadium; Attendance: 5,344; Referee: Elton Garcia

March 26 3	Detroit City FC	1–1	Pittsburgh Riverhounds	Hamtramck, Michigan
4:00 PM EDT	Hoppenot (yellow card) 58'; Amoo-Mensah (yellow card) 67'; Rodriguez 73' (pen.)	Report	Dikwa 18'; Wiedt (yellow card) 67'; Ybarra (yellow card) 68'	Stadium: Keyworth Stadium; Attendance: 4,733; Referee: Adam Kilpatrick

April 2 4	Detroit City FC	1–1	Memphis 901 FC	Hamtramck, Michigan
5:00 PM EDT	Diop (yellow card) 13'; Rodriguez (yellow card) 40'; Williams (yellow card) 68'; Botello Faz 73'	Report	Goodrum 28'; Kissiedou (yellow card) 53'	Stadium: Keyworth Stadium; Attendance: 4,157; Referee: Jeremy Scheer

April 9 5	Atlanta United 2	0–4	Detroit City FC	Kennesaw, Georgia
7:30 PM EDT	Mertz (yellow card) 48'; Mejía (yellow card) 57'; Ambrose (yellow card) 76'; Matheus (red card) 79'; Prince (red card) 86'	Report	Carroll 23'; Hoppenot 33'; Botello Faz 42'; Bryant 78'	Stadium: Fifth Third Bank Stadium; Attendance: 574; Referee: Jordan Gray

April 15 6	Detroit City FC	1–0	Birmingham Legion	Hamtramck, Michigan
5:00 PM EDT	Botello Faz (yellow card) 20'; Hoppenot 63'	Report	Martínez (yellow card) 26'; Kavita (yellow card) 90+5'	Stadium: Keyworth Stadium; Attendance: 4,505; Referee: Matthew Franz

April 23 7	Hartford Athletic	1–2	Detroit City FC	Hartford, Connecticut
7:00 PM EDT	Dally 42'; Boudadi (yellow card) 78'	Report	Wynne (yellow card) 54' (goal) 68'; Amoo-Mensah (yellow card) 80'; Carroll 90+3'	Stadium: Trinity Health Stadium; Attendance: 4,939; Referee: Luis Arroyo

April 30 8	Detroit City FC	2–0	New York Red Bulls II	Hamtramck, Michigan
4:00 PM EDT	Atuahene 82'; Monzon 90' (o.g.)	Report	Murphy (yellow card) 77'	Stadium: Keyworth Stadium; Attendance: 6,973; Referee: Eric Tattersall

May 7 9	FC Tulsa	3–1	Detroit City FC	Tulsa, Oklahoma
8:30 PM EDT	Rivas 15', 78' da Costa 21'; Silva (yellow card) 28'; Diz (yellow card) 71'	Report	Bryant 36'; Ouimette (yellow card) 90+6'	Stadium: ONEOK Field; Attendance: 4,311; Referee: Brandon Stevis

May 14 10	Detroit City FC	4–2	Loudoun United FC	Hamtramck, Michigan
7:30 PM EDT	Lillard 35' (o.g.); Botello Faz 39'; Bryant 45+2'; Rodriguez 53'; Wynne (yellow card) 76'; Amoo-Mensah (yellow card) 88'	Report	Hope-Gund (yellow card) 88'; Simonsen 68'; Lillard 90+2'	Stadium: Keyworth Stadium; Attendance: 5,256; Referee: Austin Saini

May 18 11	Miami FC	1–1	Detroit City FC	University Park, Florida
7:00 PM EDT	Stanley (yellow card) 82'; Sparrow (yellow card) 84'; Reid (yellow card) 88', (goal) 90+5'; McFarlane (yellow card) 89'	Report	Hoppenot 22'; Williams (yellow card) 80'; Rodriguez (yellow card) 85'	Stadium: Riccardo Silva Stadium; Attendance: 853; Referee: Alejo Calume

May 21 12	Detroit City FC	3–1	Atlanta United 2	Hamtramck, Michigan
7:30 PM EDT	Botello Faz 13'; Hoppenot 32'; Rodriguez 49'; Diop (yellow card) 54'; Ouimette (yellow card) 67'; Bryant (yellow card) 90+4'	Report	Chukwuma 44'; Morales (yellow card) 53' (yellow-red card) 64'; Mertz (yellow card) 54'; McFadden (yellow card) 57'	Stadium: Keyworth Stadium; Attendance: 5,483; Referee: Alex Billeter

June 4 13	Pittsburgh Riverhounds SC	1–1	Detroit City FC	Pittsburgh, Pennsylvania
7:00 PM EDT	Dikwa 30' (yellow card) 90+4'; Wiedt (yellow card) 41'; Griffin (yellow card) 90+2'	Report	Rodriguez 70'	Stadium: Highmark Stadium; Attendance: 4,273; Referee: Luis Arroyo

June 11 14	Detroit City FC	0–2	Sacramento Republic FC	Hamtramck, Michigan
7:30 PM EDT	Ouimette (yellow card) 58'	Report	Viader 10'; Keko 56'; Martínez (yellow card) 64'; López (yellow card) 77'	Stadium: Keyworth Stadium; Attendance: 7,011; Referee: Austin Saini

June 18 15	Detroit City FC	1–1	El Paso Locomotive FC	Hamtramck, Michigan
12:00 PM EDT	Amoo-Mensah (yellow card) 18'; Faz 23'; Diop (yellow card) 29'	Report	Calvillo 32'; Yuma (yellow card) 67'	Stadium: Keyworth Stadium; Attendance: 7,267; Referee: Matthew Conger

June 25 16	Memphis 901 FC	2–0	Detroit City FC	Memphis, Tennessee
8:30 PM EDT	Goodrum (yellow card) 4', (goal) 89'; Smith 38'	Report	Hoppenot (yellow card) 37'; Rodriguez (yellow card) 55'; Wynne (yellow card) 79'; Bryant (yellow card) 90+6'	Stadium: AutoZone Park; Attendance: 3,883; Referee: Joshua Encarnación

July 2 17	Las Vegas Lights FC	0–1	Detroit City FC	Las Vegas, Nevada
10:30 PM EDT	Sepulveda (yellow card) 90+3'	Report	Rodriguez (yellow card) 53'; Rutz 63'	Stadium: Cashman Field; Referee: Melvin Rivas

July 6 18	Detroit City FC	1–1	Hartford Athletic	Hamtramck, Michigan
7:30 PM EDT	Faz 20'	Report	Yacoubou (yellow card) 16'; Lewis 57'; Martínez (yellow card) 90'	Stadium: Keyworth Stadium; Attendance: 5,517; Referee: Matthew Thompson

July 9 19	Indy Eleven	0–1	Detroit City FC	Indianapolis, Indiana
7:00 PM EDT	Ingram (yellow card) 56'; Arteaga (yellow card) 68'; Aguilera (yellow card) 83'	Report	Rutz 5'; Bryant (yellow card) 42'; Dunwell (yellow card) 70'; Williams (yellow card) 90+3'	Stadium: Michael A. Carroll Stadium; Attendance: 9,462; Referee: Benjamin Meyer

July 16 20	Monterey Bay FC	0–0	Detroit City FC	Seaside, California
10:00 PM EDT	Dawkins (yellow card) 64'; Doner (yellow card) 68'; Rebollar (yellow card) 77'; Murphy (yellow card) 90+1'	Report	Diop (yellow card) 74'	Stadium: Cardinale Stadium; Attendance: 3,357; Referee: Mark Allatin

July 23 21	Detroit City FC	2–2	New Mexico United	Hamtramck, Michigan
7:30 PM EDT	Rodriguez 25' (pen.), (yellow card) 56'; Bryant (yellow card) 35'; Wynne 62'; Hoppenot (yellow card) 73'; Diop (yellow card) 78'; Dunwell (yellow card) 82'; Atuahene (yellow card) 85'	Report	Wehan 30'; Ryden (yellow card) 66'; Seymore (yellow card) 80'; Brett 90+2'	Stadium: Keyworth Stadium; Attendance: 7,470; Referee: Malik Badawi

August 6 22	Tampa Bay Rowdies	1–0	Detroit City FC	St. Petersburg, Florida
7:30 PM EDT	Wyke (yellow card) 42'; Dos Santos 64'	Report		Stadium: Al Lang Stadium; Attendance: 5,104; Referee: Alyssa Nichols

August 13 23	Detroit City FC	1–1	Oakland Roots SC	Hamtramck, Michigan
7:30 PM EDT	Hoppenot (yellow card) 40'; Bryant (yellow card) 72'; Atuahene 87'; Carroll (yellow card) 90+2'	Report	Hernández (yellow card) 40'; Azócar (yellow card) 45'; Dennis 50'; Rito (yellow card) 57'; Fissore (yellow card) 70'	Stadium: Keyworth Stadium; Attendance: 7,283; Referee: John Griggs

August 17 24	Birmingham Legion FC	1–2	Detroit City FC	Birmingham, Alabama
7:30 PM EDT	Lopez (yellow card) 49'; Kasim 68'; Agudelo (yellow card) 90+3'	Report	Rutz 66', (yellow card) 78'; Lewis (yellow card) 80', (goal) 82'; Dunwell (yellow card) 90'	Stadium: Protective Stadium; Referee: Elvis Osmanovic

August 20 25	Detroit City FC	0–1	Louisville City FC	Hamtramck, Michigan
7:30 PM EDT	Bryant (yellow card) 74'	Report	Totsch 66' (pen.); Charpie (red card) 69'; Harris (yellow card) 86' (yellow-red card) 90+4'	Stadium: Keyworth Stadium; Attendance: 6,011; Referee: Matt Thompson

August 27 26	Charleston Battery	0–3	Detroit City FC	Mount Pleasant, South Carolina
7:30 PM EDT	Hogan (yellow card) 36'; Crawford (yellow card) 47'	Report	Botello Faz 48' 53'; Hogan 65' (o.g.)	Stadium: Patriots Point Soccer Complex; Attendance: 3,168; Referee: Gerald Flores

September 3 27	Detroit City FC	0–0	Indy Eleven	Hamtramck, Michigan
7:30 PM EDT	Williams (yellow card) 33'; Hoppenot (yellow card) 88'	Report	Michael (yellow card) 43'; Trilk (yellow card) 90+5'; Vázquez (yellow card) 90+7'	Stadium: Keyworth Stadium; Attendance: 6,078; Referee: Brandon Stevis

September 10 28	Colorado Springs Switchbacks FC	1–2	Detroit City FC	Colorado Springs, Colorado
9:00 PM EDT	Matthews (yellow card) 27'; Rodriguez 42'; Wynne 59'	Report	Nglina (yellow card) 55'; Wheeler (yellow card) 82' (goal) 90+2'	Stadium: Weidner Field; Attendance: 7,587; Referee: Calin Radosav

September 17 29	Detroit City FC	1–0	Tampa Bay Rowdies	Hamtramck, Michigan
7:30 PM EDT	Wynne (yellow card) 62'; Hoppenot 81'; Foster (yellow card) 90+1'	Report		Stadium: Keyworth Stadium; Attendance: 6,856; Referee: Kevin Broadley

September 21 30	New York Red Bulls II	0–0	Detroit City FC	Montclair, New Jersey
7:00 PM EDT	Wise (yellow card) 48'; Filipe (yellow card) 88'	Report	Williams (yellow card) 27'; Faz (yellow card) 71'	Stadium: MSU Soccer Park at Pittser Field; Attendance: 437; Referee: Luis Arroya

September 24 31	Detroit City FC	2–2	FC Tulsa	Hamtramck, Michigan
7:30 PM EDT	Godard (yellow card) 40'; Matthews 47'; Rodriguez (yellow card) 52'; Bryant 75'	Report	Suárez 67'; Bird 69'	Stadium: Keyworth Stadium; Attendance: 6,531; Referee: Greg Dopka

October 1 32	Loudoun United FC	0–4	Detroit City FC	Leesburg, Virginia
6:30 PM EDT	Vom Steeg (yellow card) 21'; Zanne (yellow card) 83'; Liadi (yellow card) 88'	Report	Matthews 8'; Williams (yellow card) 26'; Rodriguez 41', 66', 70'; Lewis (yellow card) 73'	Stadium: Segra Field; Attendance: 2,496; Referee: Alyssa Nicholas

October 5 33	Louisville City FC	2–1	Detroit City FC	Louisville, Kentucky
7:30 PM EDT	Harris 61'; Wynder 64'; Lancaster (yellow card) 80'	Report	Wynne (yellow card) 33'; Carroll (yellow card) 34'; Hoppenot 42'; Diop (yellow card) 72'	Stadium: Lynn Family Stadium; Attendance: 9,524; Referee: John Griggs

October 15 34	Detroit City FC	0–1	Miami FC	Hamtramck, Michigan
4:00 PM EDT	Williams (yellow card) 69'	Report	Rivas 45+1'; Chapman-Page (yellow card) 80'; Segbers (yellow card) 81'; Repetto (yellow card) 89'	Stadium: Keyworth Stadium; Attendance: 7,537; Referee: Luis Guardia

==== Playoffs ====
October 22 First Round	Memphis 901 FC	3–1	Detroit City FC	Memphis, Tennessee
9:00 PM EDT	Buckmaster (yellow card) 51'; Allan 72'; Smith 88'; Goodrum 90+4' (yellow card) 90+5'	Report	Rodriguez (yellow card) 10'; Bryant (yellow card) 75'; Matthews 77'; Lewis (yellow card) 85'	Stadium: AutoZone Park; Attendance: 6,010; Referee: Elijio Arreguin

=== U.S. Open Cup ===
As a USL Championship club, Detroit City FC entered the competition in the second round, played April 5–7.

April 5 Second Round	Detroit City FC (Michigan)	3–0	Michigan Stars FC (NISA)	Hamtramck, Michigan
7:30 pm EDT	Rutz 45'; Lewis 45+2', 63'	Report	McCloud (yellow card) 9'; Firmino (yellow card) 35'; Bowie (yellow card) 85'	Stadium: Keyworth Stadium; Referee: Conlan Campbell

April 19 Third Round	Detroit City FC (Michigan)	2–1	(Ohio) Columbus Crew (MLS)	Hamtramck, Michigan
7:00 pm EDT	Lewis (yellow card) 62'; Rodriguez 64', 86' (pen.)		Zardes 7' (pen.); Sands (yellow card) 43'; Parente (yellow card) 66'; Berry (yellow card) 87'	Stadium: Keyworth Stadium; Attendance: 6,121; Referee: Chris Ruska

May 10 Round of 32	Detroit City FC (Michigan)	1–1 (a.e.t.) (2-4 p)	(Kentucky) Louisville City FC	Hamtramck, Michigan
7:30 pm EDT	Rodriguez 14' (pen.); Atuahene (yellow card) 44'; Forbes (yellow card) 107'	Report	Harris 24', (yellow card) 52'; Bone (yellow card) 42'; Totsch (yellow card) 110'	Stadium: Keyworth Stadium; Attendance: 6,837; Referee: Calin Radosav
	Penalties
	Rodriguez (penalty scored); Williams (penalty missed); Hoppenot (penalty scored); Carroll (penalty missed)		(penalty scored) Totsch; (penalty scored) McCabe; (penalty scored) Harris; (penalty scored) Pino

== Statistics ==
No.	Pos	Nat	Player	Total		USL		USL Playoffs		U.S. Open Cup	
No.	Pos	Nat	Player	Apps	Goals	Apps	Goals	Apps	Goals	Apps	Goals
Goalkeepers
1	GK	(United States) USA	Nate Steinwascher	37	0	33	0	1	0	3	0
13	GK	(United States) USA	Ryan Shellow	1	0	1	0	0	0	0	0
Defenders
2	DF	(United States) USA	Rhys Williams	37	0	33	0	1	0	3	0
5	DF	(Republic of Ireland) IRL	Stephen Carroll	33	2	29	2	1	0	3	0
15	DF	(United States) USA	Matt Lewis	28	3	25	1	1	0	2	2
20	DF	(New Zealand) NZL	Deklan Wynne	36	3	32	3	1	0	3	0
22	DF	(Canada) CAN	Karl Ouimette	15	0	15	0	0	0	0	0
23	DF	(Scotland) SCO	Richard Foster	5	0	5	0	0	0	0	
30	DF	(United States) USA	Devon Amoo-Mensah	22	0	19	0	0	0	3	0
Midfielders
6	MF	(United States) USA	Brad Dunwell	21	0	20	0	0	0	1	0
8	MF	(Senegal) SEN	Abdoulaye Diop	30	0	26	0	1	0	3	0
12	MF	(United States) USA	Michael Bryant	33	4	30	4	0	0	3	0
14	MF	(Japan) JPN	Cy Goddard	7	0	6	0	1	0	0	0
17	MF	(Hungary) HUN	Benedek Tanyi	1	0	1	0	0	0	0	0
21	MF	(United States) USA	Maxi Rodriguez	37	13	33	10	1	0	3	3
24	MF	(United States) USA	Dominic Gasso	2	0	2	0	0	0	0	0
47	MF	(Hungary) HUN	Barnabas Tanyi	8	0	7	0	0	0	1	0
Forwards
7	FW	(Turks and Caicos Islands) TCA	Billy Forbes	6	0	5	0	0	0	1	0
9	FW	(Ghana) GHA	Francis Atuahene	32	2	30	2	0	0	2	0
11	FW	(United States) USA	Connor Rutz	37	4	33	3	1	0	3	1
19	FW	(Mexico) MEX	Pato Botello Faz	34	8	31	8	0	0	3	0
27	FW	(South Africa) RSA	Yazeed Matthews	12	3	11	2	1	1	0	0
29	FW	(France) FRA	Antoine Hoppenot	35	7	32	7	0	0	3	0
77	FW	(Senegal) SEN	Amadou Macky Diop	7	0	6	0	1	0	0	0

Last updated: October 22, 2022.

=== Top scorers ===
Rank	Position	Number	Name	USL	USL Playoffs	U.S. Open Cup	Total
1	MF	21	(United States) Maxi Rodriguez	10	0	3	13
2	FW	19	(Mexico) Pato Botello Faz	8	0	0	8
3	FW	29	(France) Antoine Hoppenot	7	0	0	7
4	FW	11	(United States) Connor Rutz	3	0	1	4
4	MF	12	(United States) Michael Bryant	4	0	0	4

Last updated: October 22, 2022.
