= 2023 Detroit City FC season =

American soccer team season

Detroit City FC
2023 season
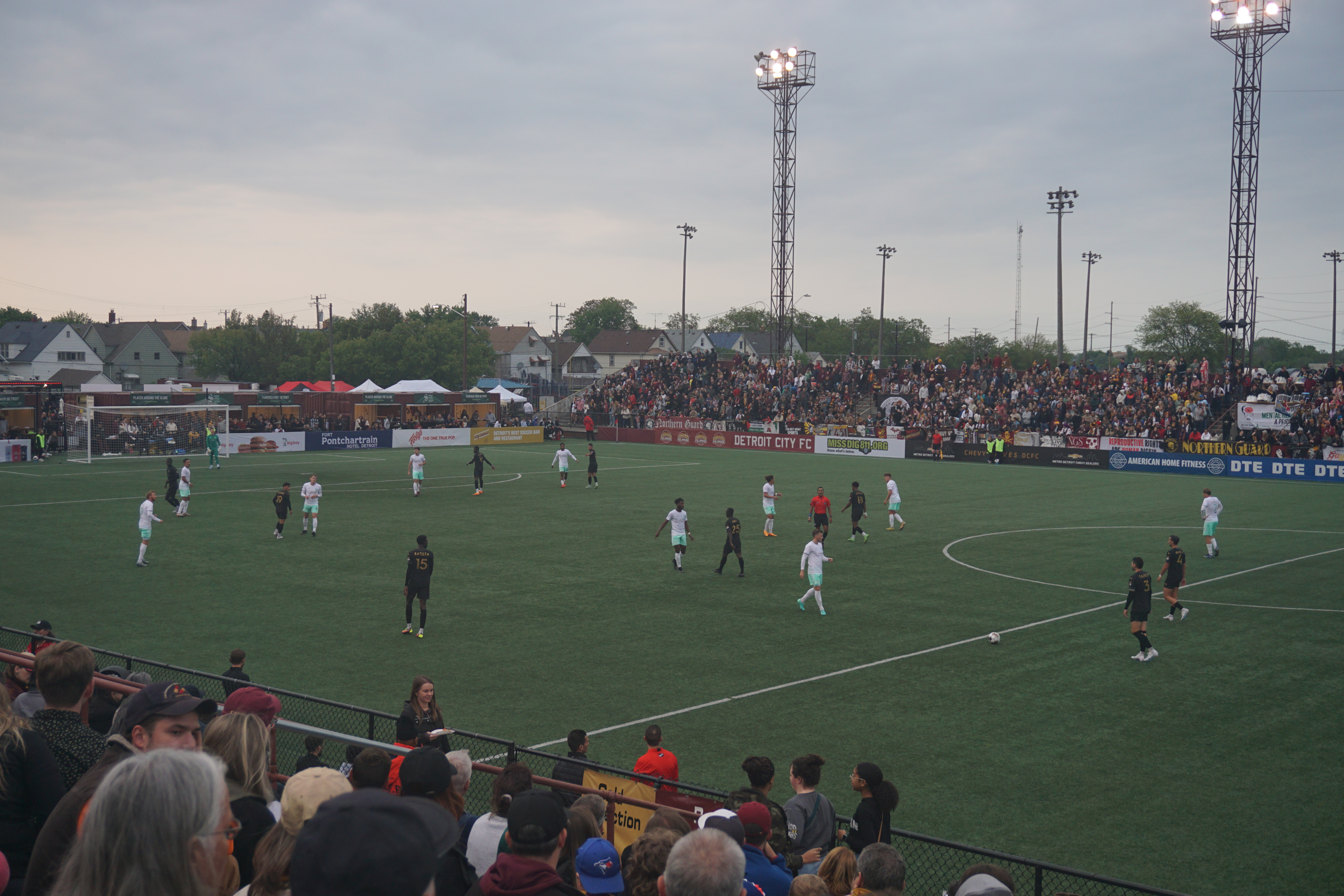
- Detroit City FC takes on San Antonio FC at Keyworth Stadium in May, 2023
- CEO: Sean Mann
- Manager: Trevor James
- Stadium: Keyworth Stadium; Hamtramck, Michigan
- USL Championship: 8th (Eastern Conference)
- U.S. Open Cup: Third Round
- Top goalscorer: 7 goals: Ben Morris
- Highest home attendance: 7,181 v. LVL (8/19)
- Lowest home attendance: 4,293 v. RGV (4/1)
- Average home league attendance: 6,032
- Biggest win: DET 3-0 HFD (9/23); LDN 0-3 DET (10/7)
- Biggest defeat: PHX 5-0 DET (9/16)
Home colors	Away colors	Alternative colors

The 2023 Detroit City FC season was the club's fifth professional season since the club was established in 2012, and the team's second season in the USL Championship.

== Kits ==
Home	Away	Alternate for Detroit's birthday	Pride for Ruth Ellis Center	Charity for Brilliant Detroit

== Roster ==
Final 2023 roster

No.	Pos.	Nation	Player
1	GK	USA	Nate Steinwascher
2	DF	USA	Rhys Williams
4	DF	USA	Jalen Robinson
5	DF	IRL	Stephen Carroll
7	FW	NOR	Skage Simonsen
8	MF	SEN	Abdoulaye Diop
9	FW	ENG	Ben Morris
11	FW	USA	Connor Rutz
12	MF	USA	Michael Bryant
13	GK	USA	Ryan Shellow
15	DF	USA	Matt Lewis
17	DF	CAN	Brett Levis
19	MF	GER	Adrian Billhardt
21	MF	USA	Maxi Rodriguez
24	MF	USA	Dominic Gasso
26	MF	USA	Richard Ballard
27	FW	RSA	Yazeed Matthews
30	DF	USA	Devon Amoo-Mensah
73	FW	CMR	Aaron Bibout (on loan from LA Galaxy II)
91	DF	JAM	Oniel Fisher
92	FW	CUB	Darío Suárez

== Coaching staff ==
Technical staff
Head coach / General manager	(England) Trevor James
Assistant coach	(United States) Ryan Needs
Assistant coach	(England) Steve Myles
Goalkeeping coach	(United States) Eric Perilla

== Transfers ==
For transfers in, dates listed are when Detroit City FC officially signed the players to the roster. Transactions where only the rights to the players are acquired are not listed. For transfers out, dates listed are when Detroit City FC officially removed the players from its roster, not when they signed with another club. If a player later signed with another club, his new club will be noted, but the date listed here remains the one when he was officially removed from the Detroit City FC roster.

=== In ===
No.	Pos.	Player	Transferred from	Fee/notes	Date	Source
7	FW	(Norway) Skage Simonsen	(United States) Loudoun United		December 13, 2022	
26	MF	(United States) Richard Ballard	(United States) Miami FC		January 10, 2023	
19	MF	(Germany) Adrian Billhardt	(United States) Tormenta FC		January 19, 2023	
4	DF	(United States) Jalen Robinson	(United States) Loudoun United		February 2, 2023	
9	FW	(England) Ben Morris	(England) Ipswich Town F.C.		February 15, 2023	
6	MF	(United States) Tommy McCabe	(United States) Orange County SC		March 8, 2023	
99	MF	(Colombia) Vincenzo Candela	(United States) Richmond Kickers		March 23, 2023	
91	DF	(United States) Oniel Fisher	(United States) Minnesota United FC		March 29, 2023	
17	DF	(Canada) Brett Levis	(United States) FC Tulsa	Tommy McCabe sent to FC Tulsa as part of the exchange for Brett Levis and Darío Suárez	June 6, 2023	
92	FW	(Cuba) Darío Suárez	(United States) FC Tulsa	Tommy McCabe sent to FC Tulsa as part of the exchange for Brett Levis and Darío Suárez	June 6, 2023	
73	FW	(Cameroon) Aaron Bibout	(United States) LA Galaxy II	Loan	September 21, 2023	

=== Out ===
No.	Pos.	Player	Transferred to	Fee/notes	Date	Source
6	MF	(United States) Tommy McCabe	(United States) FC Tulsa	Tommy McCabe sent to FC Tulsa as part of the exchange for Brett Levis and Darío Suárez	June 6, 2023	
14	MF	(Japan) Cy Goddard	(India) Odisha FC		July 28, 2023	
99	MF	(Colombia) Vincenzo Candela	(Sweden) Bodens BK		July 28, 2023	

== Competitions ==
=== USL Championship ===
==== Eastern Conference ====
Pos	Team	Pld	W	L	T	GF	GA	GD	Pts	Qualification
6	Indy Eleven	34	13	11	10	46	38	+8	49	Playoffs
7	Birmingham Legion FC	34	14	16	4	44	53	−9	46	Playoffs
8	Detroit City FC	34	11	15	8	30	39	−9	41	Playoffs
9	Miami FC	34	11	15	8	43	44	−1	41	
10	FC Tulsa	34	10	15	9	43	55	−12	39	

Source: USL Championship Standings
Rules for classification: 1) head-to-head points; 2) head-to-head goal differential; 3) points-per game within conference; 4) total wins; 5) total goal differential; 6) total goals scored; 7) points earned against top four Conference finishers; 8) disciplinary points; 9) coin toss or drawing of lots

Overall								Home						Away					
Pld	W	D	L	GF	GA	GD	Pts	W	D	L	GF	GA	GD	W	D	L	GF	GA	GD
34	11	8	15	30	39	−9	41	7	4	6	14	12	+2	4	4	9	16	27	−11

Source: Match reports

==== Matches ====
March 11 1	San Diego Loyal SC	1–0	Detroit City FC	San Diego, California
11:00 PM EST	Conway (yellow card) 28'; Kasanzu 42'; Ackon (yellow card) 66'	Report	Carroll (yellow card) 54'; Matthews (yellow card) 59'	Stadium: Torero Stadium; Attendance: 5,671; Referee: Ricardo Fierro

March 18 2	El Paso Locomotive FC	1–3	Detroit City FC	El Paso, Texas
9:30 PM EST	Kostyshyn 17'; Calvillo (yellow card) 52'; Borelli (yellow card) 52'	Report	Yuma 9' (o.g.); Matthews (yellow card) 57' (goal) 60'; Rodriguez 78'	Stadium: Southwest University Park; Attendance: 5,014; Referee: Greg Dopka

March 25 3	Detroit City FC	0–1	Indy Eleven	Hamtramck, Michigan
4:00 PM EDT	Ballard (yellow card) 16'; Matthews (yellow card) 39' (yellow-red card) 74'; Williams (yellow card) 48'; Carroll (yellow card) 90+6'; Simonsen (yellow card) 90+9'	Report	Boudadi (yellow card) 14'; Asante (yellow card) 21'; Martínez (yellow card) 33'; Rebellón 62'	Stadium: Keyworth Stadium; Attendance: 6,182; Referee: Jervis Atagana

April 1 4	Detroit City FC	0–1	Rio Grande Valley FC	Hamtramck, Michigan
7:00 PM EDT	Simonsen (yellow card) 41'; Rodriguez (yellow card) 58'	Report	Nodarse (yellow card) 11'; Davila 23'; Ricketts (yellow card) 44'	Stadium: Keyworth Stadium; Attendance: 4,293; Referee: Adam Kilpatrick

April 8 5	Louisville City FC	1–0	Detroit City FC	Louisville, Kentucky
3:00 PM EDT	Harris 80'	Report	Rodriguez (yellow card) 45+2'	Stadium: Lynn Family Stadium; Referee: Sergii Demianchuk

April 15 6	Miami FC	0–0	Detroit City FC	Miami, Florida
7:00 PM EDT	Salazar (yellow card) 53'	Report	Rodriguez (yellow card) 22'; Diop (yellow card) 32'	Stadium: Riccardo Silva Stadium; Attendance: 1,559; Referee: Melvin Rivas

April 23 7	Sacramento Republic FC	1–0	Detroit City FC	Sacramento, California
10:00 PM EDT	Felipe 9'; Gurr (yellow card) 36'	Report		Stadium: Heart Health Park; Attendance: 9,896; Referee: Jeremy Scheer

April 29 8	Detroit City FC	0–1	Tampa Bay Rowdies	Hamtramck, Michigan
4:00 PM EDT	Fisher (yellow card) 29'; Bryant (yellow card) 51'; Amoo-Mensah (yellow card) 78'	Report	Herivaux (yellow card) 41'; Dennis 79' (pen.); Kleemann (yellow card) 89'	Stadium: Keyworth Stadium; Attendance: 4,840; Referee: Calin Radosav

May 6 9	Detroit City FC	1–1	FC Tulsa	Hamtramck, Michigan
7:30 PM EDT	Diop 10' (yellow card) 75'; Williams (yellow card) 20' (yellow-red card) 83'; Bryant (yellow card) 44'; Matthews (yellow card) 87'	Report	Bird (yellow card) 18'; Suárez 45' (pen.); Tetteh (yellow card) 65'	Stadium: Keyworth Stadium; Attendance: 5,138; Referee: Eric Tattersall

May 13 10	Tampa Bay Rowdies	5–1	Detroit City FC	St. Petersburg, Florida
7:30 PM EDT	Williams 3', 13', 43'; Guillén (yellow card) 19'; Ekra (yellow card) 30'; Dennis 37'; Harris 53'; Kleemann (yellow card) 72'; Lasso (yellow card) 88'	Report	Diop 22'; Bryant (yellow card) 35'; Fisher (yellow card) 82'	Stadium: Al Lang Stadium; Attendance: 5,239; Referee: Nabil Bensalah

May 20 11	Detroit City FC	1–0	San Antonio FC	Hamtramck, Michigan
7:30 PM EDT	Simonsen 5'; Bryant (yellow card) 78'	Report	Gomez (yellow card) 45+3'; Hernández (yellow card) 90+2'; Batista (yellow card) 90+4'	Stadium: Keyworth Stadium; Attendance: 5,924; Referee: Gerald Flores

May 27 12	Detroit City FC	1–0	Birmingham Legion FC	Hamtramck, Michigan
4:00 PM EDT	Rodriguez 29'; Williams (yellow card) 68'; Matthews (yellow card) 82'; Amoo-Mensah (yellow card) 90+3'	Report	Mensah (yellow card) 28'; Lopez (yellow card) 35'; Smith (yellow card) 44'; Dupont (yellow card) 90'	Stadium: Keyworth Stadium; Attendance: 6,164; Referee: Melvin Rivas

June 7 13	Charleston Battery	0–0	Detroit City FC	Mount Pleasant, South Carolina
10:30 PM EDT	Williams (yellow card) 33'	Report	Williams (yellow card) 15'; Bryant (yellow card) 78'; Fisher (yellow card) 60'	Stadium: Patriots Point Soccer Complex; Attendance: 2,196; Referee: John Matto

June 14 14	Hartford Athletic	1–3	Detroit City FC	Hartford, Connecticut
7:30 PM EDT	Rito (yellow card) 34'; Hoppenot 37'; Edwards (yellow card) 42'; Apollon (yellow card) 83'	Report	Morris 24', 58'; Simonsen 43'; Matthews (yellow card) 65'; Rutz (yellow card) 68'; Rodriguez (yellow card) 74'	Stadium: Trinity Health Stadium; Attendance: 4194; Referee: Alexandra Billeter

June 17 15	Memphis 901 FC	0-0	Detroit City FC	Memphis, Tennessee
8:30 PM EDT	Turci (yellow card) 54'; Kelly (yellow card) 64'	Report	Fisher (yellow card) 33'; Rodriguez (yellow card) 45'; Simonsen (yellow card) 49'	Stadium: AutoZone Park; Referee: Joshua Encarnación

June 25 16	Detroit City FC	0–1	Orange County SC	Hamtramck, Michigan
8:30 PM EDT	Williams (yellow card) 63'; Lewis (yellow card) 70'; Carroll (yellow card) 72'	Report	M. Iloski 23'; B. Iloski (yellow card) 55'; McNulty (yellow card) 61'; Partida (yellow card) 65'; Nakkim (yellow card) 90'; Scott (red card) 90+6'	Stadium: Keyworth Stadium; Attendance: 6,669; Referee: Alejo Calume

June 30 17	FC Tulsa	3-2	Detroit City FC	Tulsa, Oklahoma
9:00 PM EDT	Goodrum 36' (pen.), 82'; Dyer (yellow card) 54'; Yosef (yellow card) 59'; Epps 89'	Report	Steinwascher (yellow card) 35'; Lewis 40'; Gasso (yellow card) 55'; Carroll (yellow card) 57' (goal) 74'	Stadium: ONEOK Field; Attendance: 5,565; Referee: Olvin Oliva

July 8 18	New Mexico United	1–0	Detroit City FC	Albuquerque, New Mexico
9:00 PM EDT	Bruce (yellow card) 21'; Waggoner 82'; Hurst (yellow card) 88'	Report	Rodriguez (yellow card) 41'; Amoo-Mensah (yellow card) 63'	Stadium: Isotopes Park; Attendance: 9,495; Referee: Elvis Osmanovic

July 12 19	Detroit City FC	1–1	Loudoun United FC	Hamtramck, Michigan
7:30 PM EDT	Suárez 59'; Steinwascher (yellow card) 67'	Report	Turner (yellow card) 20'; Houssou (yellow card) 50'; Ryan 66' (pen.); Williamson (red card) 67'; Leerman (yellow card) 90+4'	Stadium: Keyworth Stadium; Attendance: 5,291; Referee: Austin Saini

July 15 20	Pittsburgh Riverhounds SC	2–0	Detroit City FC	Pittsburgh, Pennsylvania
7:00 PM EDT	Kizza 8'; Forbes (yellow card) 37'; Ordoñez (yellow card) 47'; Fahling 51'	Report		Stadium: Highmark Stadium; Attendance: 5,151; Referee: Gerald Flores

July 19 21	Detroit City FC	2–0	Louisville City FC	Hamtramck, Michigan
7:00 PM EDT	Morris 5' (yellow card) 84'; Bryant (yellow card) 45+4'; Totsch 60' (o.g.); Rodriguez (yellow card) 79'; Steinwascher (yellow card) 90+6'	Report	Jimenez (yellow card) 74'; Charpie (yellow card) 82'; Pouwels (yellow card) 90+6'	Stadium: Keyworth Stadium; Attendance: 6,382; Referee: Alexis Da Silva

July 22 22	Detroit City FC	1–0	Monterey Bay FC	Hamtramck, Michigan
8:36 PM EDT	Levis (yellow card) 49'; Diop (yellow card) 62'; Lara 75' (o.g.)	Report	Doner (yellow card) 52'	Stadium: Keyworth Stadium; Attendance: 6,928; Referee: Sergii Demianchuk

July 29 23	Oakland Roots SC	1–1	Detroit City FC	Hayward, California
7:30 PM EDT	Rodriguez 1'	Report	Carroll 5'	Stadium: Pioneer Stadium; Attendance: 2,586; Referee: Brad Jensen

August 12 24	Detroit City FC	0-1	Charleston Battery	Hamtramck, Michigan
7:30 PM EDT	Lewis (yellow card) 7'; Bryant (yellow card) 27'; Levis (yellow card) 81'	Report	Palma (yellow card) 40'; Williams 71'; Reedy (yellow card) 75'; Booth (yellow card) 90+5'	Stadium: Keyworth Stadium; Attendance: 7,022; Referee: Abdou Ndiaye

August 19 25	Detroit City FC	1–0	Las Vegas Lights FC	Hamtramck, Michigan
7:30 PM EDT	Simonsen 36'; Steinwascher (yellow card) 81'; Ballard (yellow card) 84'	Report	Tabort Etaka (yellow card) 73'; Ingram (yellow card) 73'; Bushue (yellow card) 90+5'	Stadium: Keyworth Stadium; Attendance: 7,181; Referee: Olvin Oliva

August 27 26	Birmingham Legion FC	2–3	Detroit City FC	Birmingham, Alabama
5:00 PM EDT	Brett 29' (pen.); Martínez 38' (pen.); Mensah (yellow card) 48'; Lopez (yellow card) 66'	Report	Morris 31', 44'; Kavita 45' (o.g.)	Stadium: Protective Stadium; Attendance: 3,250; Referee: Greg Dopka

September 2 27	Detroit City FC	1-1	Memphis 901 FC	Hamtramck, Michigan
7:30 PM EDT	Rutz (yellow card) 3'; Amoo-Mensah 36'; Gasso (yellow card) 39'	Report	Bruno Lapa (yellow card) 30'; Luiz Fernando 72'	Stadium: Keyworth Stadium; Attendance: 6,266; Referee: Thomas Snyder

September 9 28	Detroit City FC	2–1	Miami FC	Hamtramck, Michigan
7:30 PM EDT	Bryant 2'; Rodriguez (yellow card) 24'; Amoo-Mensah 55'	Report	Zendejas (yellow card) 45+3'; Valot (yellow card) 61'; Repetto 75' (pen.); Segbers (yellow card) 86'; Ofeimu (yellow card) 90+2'	Stadium: Keyworth Stadium; Attendance: 6,528; Referee: Ricardo Fierro

September 16 29	Phoenix Rising FC	5–0	Detroit City FC	Phoenix, Arizona
10:30 PM EDT	Trejo 45+1', 65'; Armenakas 56'; Arteaga 81'; Zambrano (yellow card) 86'; Formella 90'	Report	Lewis (yellow card) 80'	Stadium: Phoenix Rising Soccer Stadium; Attendance: 5,887; Referee: Joshua Encarnación

September 23 30	Detroit City FC	3–0	Hartford Athletic	Hamtramck, Michigan
7:30 PM EDT	Suárez 24' (yellow card) 25'; Bryant 31'; Morris 57'	Report	Hoppenot (yellow card) 58'	Stadium: Keyworth Stadium; Attendance: 6,547; Referee: Alejo Calume

September 27 31	Detroit City FC	0–3	Colorado Springs Switchbacks FC	Hamtramck, Michigan
7:30 PM EDT	Bryant (yellow card) 53' (yellow-red card) 58'; Lewis (yellow card) 90+5'	Report	Tejada 15'; Williams 24', 49' (yellow card) 54'; Chapman (yellow card) 27'; Musa (yellow card) 37'; Skundrich (yellow card) 43'; Williams (yellow card) 79'; Herrera (yellow card) 80'	Stadium: Keyworth Stadium; Attendance: 5,021; Referee: Kevin Broadley

September 30 32	Indy Eleven	3-0	Detroit City FC	Indianapolis, Indiana
7:00 PM EDT	Martínez 45'; Velásquez (yellow card) 45+2' (goal) 69'; Molina 90+3' (yellow card) 90+7'	Report	Fisher (yellow card) 33'; Diop (yellow card) 74'	Stadium: Michael A. Carroll Stadium; Attendance: 12,351; Referee: Katja Koroleva

October 7 33	Loudoun United FC	0-3	Detroit City FC	Leesburg, Virginia
6:30 PM EDT	Leggett (yellow card) 48'; Rocha (yellow card) 48'; Fauroux (yellow card) 67'; Hegardt (yellow card) 90+1'	Report	Rodriguez 6', 41' (pen.) (yellow card) 54'; Morris 65'; Levis (yellow card) 79'	Stadium: Segra Field; Attendance: 4,389; Referee: Jeremy Scheer

October 14 34	Detroit City FC	0–0	Pittsburgh Riverhounds SC	Hamtramck, Michigan
4:00 PM EDT	Gasso (yellow card) 47'; Diop (yellow card) 71'	Report	Farrell (yellow card) 27'	Stadium: Keyworth Stadium; Attendance: 6,190; Referee: Brandon Stevis

==== Playoffs ====
October 21 Round of 16	Pittsburgh Riverhounds SC	0-1	Detroit City FC	Pittsburgh, Pennsylvania
7:00 PM EDT	Dossantos (yellow card) 15'; Dikwa (yellow card) 52'	Report	Lewis (yellow card) 4'; Amoo-Mensah (yellow card) 38'; Rodriguez (yellow card) 52'; Gasso 78'	Stadium: Highmark Stadium; Attendance: 6,123; Referee: Sergii Demianchuk

October 28 Quarterfinals	Louisville City FC	4-0	Detroit City FC	Louisville, Kentucky
7:30 PM EDT	Lancaster 15' (pen.), 59'; Ownby 43'; Gonzalez 60'	Report	Bryant (yellow card) 14'	Stadium: Lynn Family Stadium; Attendance: 7,959; Referee: Ricardo Fierro

=== U.S. Open Cup ===
As a USL Championship club, Detroit City FC entered the competition in the second round.

April 4 Second Round	Detroit City FC (Michigan)	1–0	(Michigan) Gold Star FC (NISA)	Hamtramck, Michigan
7:30 pm EDT	Bryant (yellow card) 35'; Matthews 43'; Robinson (yellow card) 75'	Report	Gibbons (yellow card) 14'; Rugova (yellow card) 16'; Burris (yellow card) 60'; Gatt (yellow card) 82'; Boateng (yellow card) 90+6'	Stadium: Keyworth Stadium; Attendance: 1,361; Referee: Joshua Encarnación

April 25 Third Round	Detroit City FC (Michigan)	1–3	Minnesota United (MLS)	Hamtramck, Michigan
7:30 pm EDT	Matthews 5'; Rodriguez (yellow card) 49'; McCabe (yellow card) 90+1'	Report	Fragapane 60'; Iwe 63'; Amarilla 66'; Hlongwane (yellow card) 69'	Stadium: Keyworth Stadium; Attendance: 4,529; Referee: Christian Little

== Statistics ==
No.	Pos	Nat	Player	Total		USL		U.S. Open Cup	
No.	Pos	Nat	Player	Apps	Goals	Apps	Goals	Apps	Goals
Goalkeepers
1	GK	(United States) USA	Nate Steinwascher	35	0	34	0	1	0
13	GK	(United States) USA	Ryan Shellow	3	0	2	0	1	0
Defenders
2	DF	(United States) USA	Rhys Williams	37	0	35	0	2	0
4	DF	(United States) USA	Jalen Robinson	12	0	11	0	1	0
5	DF	(Republic of Ireland) IRL	Stephen Carroll	35	2	33	2	2	0
15	DF	(United States) USA	Matt Lewis	26	1	25	1	1	0
17	DF	(Canada) CAN	Brett Levis	15	0	15	0	0	0
30	DF	(United States) USA	Devon Amoo-Mensah	29	2	28	2	1	0
91	DF	(Jamaica) JAM	Oniel Fisher	23	0	21	0	2	0
Midfielders
6	MF	(United States) USA	Tommy McCabe	12	0	11	0	1	0
8	MF	(Senegal) SEN	Abdoulaye Diop	30	2	28	2	2	0
12	MF	(United States) USA	Michael Bryant	36	2	34	2	2	0
14	MF	(Japan) JPN	Cy Goddard	5	0	5	0	0	0
19	MF	(Germany) GER	Adrian Billhardt	15	0	13	0	2	0
21	MF	(United States) USA	Maxi Rodriguez	36	4	34	4	2	0
24	MF	(United States) USA	Dominic Gasso	18	1	18	1	0	0
26	MF	(United States) USA	Richard Ballard	26	0	25	0	1	0
99	MF	(United States) USA	Vincenzo Candela	1	0	0	0	1	0
Forwards
7	FW	(Norway) NOR	Skage Simonsen	26	3	24	3	2	0
9	FW	(England) ENG	Ben Morris	35	7	33	7	2	0
11	FW	(United States) USA	Connor Rutz	35	0	33	0	2	0
27	FW	(South Africa) RSA	Yazeed Matthews	23	3	21	1	2	2
73	FW	(Cameroon) CMR	Aaron Bibout	5	0	5	0	0	0
92	FW	(Cuba) CUB	Darío Suárez	18	2	18	2	0	0

Last updated: November 14, 2023.

=== Top scorers ===
Rank	Position	Number	Name	USL	USL Playoffs	U.S. Open Cup	Total
1	FW	9	(England) Ben Morris	7	0	0	7
2	MF	21	(United States) Maxi Rodriguez	4	0	0	4
3	FW	7	(Norway) Skage Simonsen	3	0	0	3
3	DF	27	(South Africa) Yazeed Matthews	1	0	2	3
5	DF	5	(Republic of Ireland) Stephen Carroll	2	0	0	2
5	MF	8	(Senegal) Abdoulaye Diop	2	0	0	2
5	MF	12	(United States) Michael Bryant	2	0	0	2
5	DF	30	(United States) Devon Amoo-Mensah	1	0	0	2
5	FW	92	(Cuba) Darío Suárez	2	0	0	2
10	DF	15	(United States) Matt Lewis	1	0	0	1
10	MF	24	(United States) Dominic Gasso	0	1	0	1

Last updated: November 14, 2023.
