= Ben Morris (footballer) =

English footballer (born 1999)

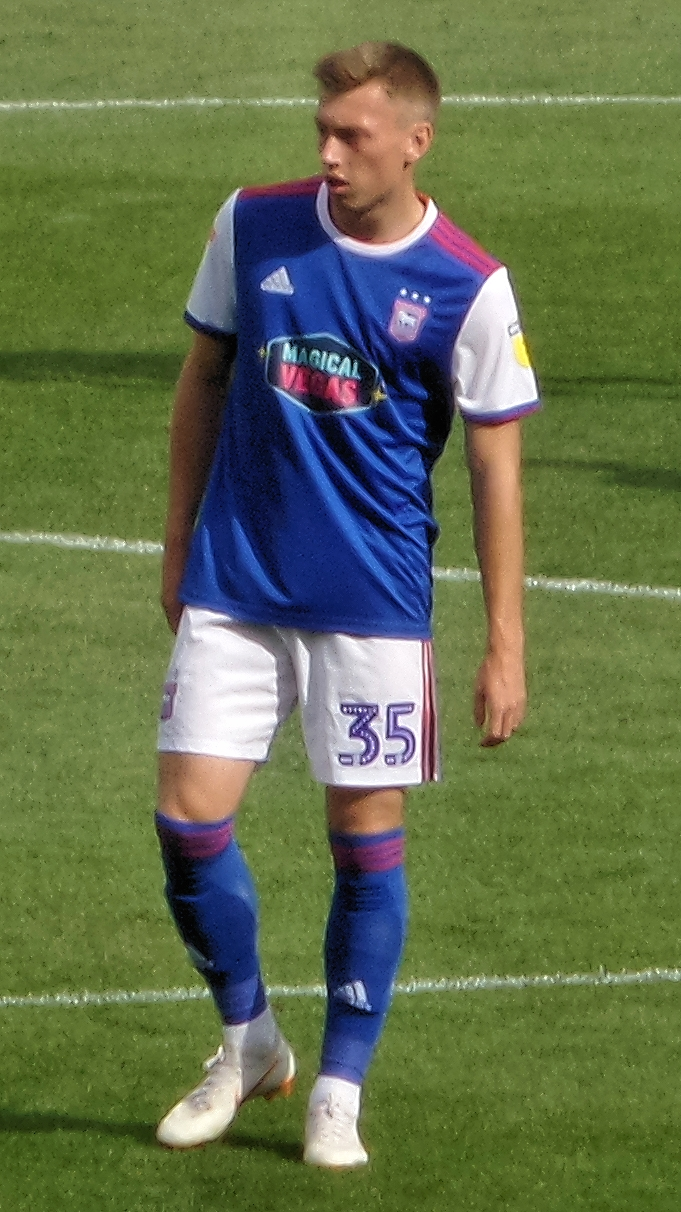
- Morris playing for Ipswich Town in 2018

Personal information
- Full name: Benjamin James Morris
- Date of birth: 6 July 1999 (age 27)
- Place of birth: Colchester, England
- Height: 5 ft 9 in (1.75 m)
- Position: Forward

Team information
- Current team: Detroit City
- Number: 9

Youth career
- –2013: Cornard United
- 2013–2016: Ipswich Town

Senior career*
Years	Team	Apps	(Gls)
2016–2023	Ipswich Town	4	(0)
2016–2017	→ Woking (loan)	1	(0)
2018–2019	→ Forest Green Rovers (loan)	4	(1)
2022	→ GAIS (loan)	28	(4)
2023–	Detroit City	93	(20)

International career
2015–2016	England U17	10	(1)
2016–2017	England U18	2	(0)
2017–2018	England U19	1	(0)
- * Club domestic league appearances and goals as of November 4, 2026

Benjamin James Morris (born 6 July 1999) is an English professional footballer who plays as a forward for Detroit City in the USL Championship.

== Club career ==
=== Ipswich Town ===
Morris became a schoolboy player with Ipswich Town during the 2013–14 season and a full academy player in June 2015, signing a two-year scholarship, before he signed a two-year pro deal on his 17th birthday. After playing regularly for the Ipswich Town Under-23s, he featured on the bench for the first team, before joining National League side Woking on a youth loan in March 2017, making one appearance for the Surrey-based side.

He made his senior Ipswich debut as a second-half substitute in an EFL Cup match at Crystal Palace on 22 August 2017, getting an assist for Ipswich's goal in a 2–1 defeat. He signed a contract extension in November 2017, extending his stay at Ipswich until 2019, with the option of an additional year extension. Morris made his full league debut for the club as an 80th minute substitute against Hull City on 13 March 2018. Morris made his first league start for the club a month later against Nottingham Forest

On 17 December 2018, Morris signed a new contract at Ipswich, keeping him at the club until 2021, with the option of an additional year extension.

==== Forest Green Rovers (loan) ====
On 31 August 2018, Morris joined League Two side Forest Green Rovers on loan for the 2018–19 season. He scored his first professional goal in a 2–1 win over Carlisle United on 24 November 2018. Morris was recalled from his loan spell on 3 January 2019. He made eight appearances in all competitions for the Gloucestershire based club during his loan spell.

==== Return to Ipswich ====
In February 2019, Morris suffered an anterior cruciate ligament injury in training. He made his return from injury in December 2019, featuring regularly for Ipswich's under-23 side. On 17 January 2020, he scored in a 3–1 win against Norwich City under-23s, before netting a brace against Coventry City under-23s ten days later in a 3–0 win. In August 2020, Morris suffered a second ACL injury, only eight months after returning to action following a similar injury.

After working his way back to fitness, in June 2021, Morris signed a new one-year contract at Ipswich, with the option of an additional years' extension.

==== GAIS (loan) ====
On 31 January 2022, Morris joined Swedish side GAIS on loan until November 2022.

=== Detroit City ===
On 15 February 2023, Morris was signed to a two-year contract with USL Championship side Detroit City FC with an option in place for the 2024 season.

== International career ==
Morris made his international debut for the England U17 team on 5 February 2016, in a 1–1 draw with Portugal. He scored his first international goal in a 2–0 win over France on 9 May 2016. He was part of the England under-17 side the competed at the 2016 UEFA European Under-17 Championship, coming off the bench in a 1–0 loss to Spain in the quarter-final of the tournament.

He won his first cap for the England U18 team on 1 September 2016, as a second-half substitute in a 2–1 win over Italy at the Highbury Stadium. He won two caps for England's under-18's during 2016.

He made his debut for the England U19 team on 20 July 2018, coming on as a substitute in a 1–1 draw with Ukraine.

== Career statistics ==
As of match played 1 January 2025

Appearances and goals by club, season and competition
Club	Season	League			National cup		EFL Cup		Other		Total	
Club	Season	Division	Apps	Goals	Apps	Goals	Apps	Goals	Apps	Goals	Apps	Goals
Ipswich Town	2016–17	Championship	0	0	0	0	0	0	—		0	0
Ipswich Town	2017–18	Championship	3	0	0	0	1	0	—		4	0
Ipswich Town	2018–19	Championship	1	0	0	0	0	0	—		1	0
Ipswich Town	2019–20	League One	0	0	0	0	0	0	0	0	0	0
Ipswich Town	2020–21	League One	0	0	0	0	0	0	0	0	0	0
Ipswich Town	Total		4	0	0	0	1	0	0		5	0
Woking (loan)	2016–17	National League	1	0	0	0	—		0	0	1	0
Forest Green Rovers (loan)	2018–19	League Two	4	1	1	0	0	0	3 (Note: Appearances in EFL Trophy)	0	8	1
GAIS (loan)	2022	Ettan	28	4	3	0	—		—		31	4
Detroit City FC	2023	USL Championship	31	6	2	0	–		2	0	35	6
Detroit City FC	2024	USL Championship	34	10	3	0	–		1	0	38	10
Detroit City FC	Total		65	16	5	0	0	0	3	0	73	16
Career total			102	21	9	0	1	0	6	0	118	21
