= Brilliant Detroit =

Nonprofit

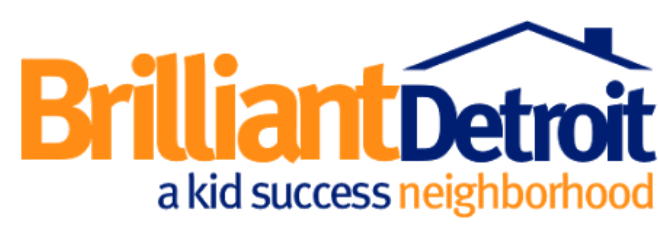
- Formation: 2016
- Type: Nonprofit organization
- Legal status: 501(c)(3)
- Location: Detroit, Michigan
- Chief Executive Officer: Cindy Eggleton
- Treasurer and Co-founder: Carolyn Bellinson
- Chair and Co-founder: Jim Bellinson
- Website: brilliantdetroit.org

Brilliant Detroit is a nonprofit organization based in Detroit, Michigan founded by Carolyn and Jim Bellinson and Cindy Eggleton that re-purposes houses and coordinates the evidence-based programs of partner organizations through them with the goal to prepare young children and their families for school, and to ensure that they are healthy and stable.

== History ==
Co-founders Carolyn and Jim Bellinson and Cindy Eggleton met in 2015 at the Early Childhood Education presentation that Eggleton gave to the Metro Detroit Jewish Fund. They identified the necessity for improved kindergarten readiness in city neighborhoods and developed their plan over the course of a year.

Brilliant Detroit became a formal 501(c)(3) nonprofit in January 2016 and launched its first house in the Warrendale/Cody Rouge neighborhood on the far west side of Detroit. After the first six months, Eggleton was named CEO as they prepared to launch a new location in the Chadsey-Condon/Southwest neighborhood. From 2016 to early 2019, the organization grew from two houses with five organizational partners, and 50 participating families to seven houses, 80 organizational partners, and over 900 participating families. More staff joined to oversee roles such as social media, volunteer and donor stewardship, finances, outreach, operations, and special projects.

As of January 2019, the organization has 12 communities on its waitlist for a new house. It is actively searching for new houses on the eastside of Detroit, and is in conversation with other U.S. cities to support new “Brilliant” programs outside of Detroit.

== Education ==
Brilliant Detroit's educational programs range from Play and Learns for families and children (CARE of Michigan, Detroit Parent Network, and the like) and parenting workshops (DPTV PreSchool U, Wayne Metro, and the like) to online childhood literacy support (ABC Mouse) and after-school high dosage tutoring (Center for Success Network), among others. The organization also partners with national organizations such as LENA Start and Raising a Reader to build early literacy and family reading habits, respectively.

== Finances ==
When it launched in 2016, Brilliant Detroit was funded by the Bellinsons. In the fall of 2017, the organization held their inaugural fundraising event and raised $1.5 million against a goal of $100,000. Since then, Brilliant Detroit has had other fundraising events and campaigns, allowing them to expand through the city.
