= James Murphy (soccer, born 1997) =

American soccer player (born 1997)

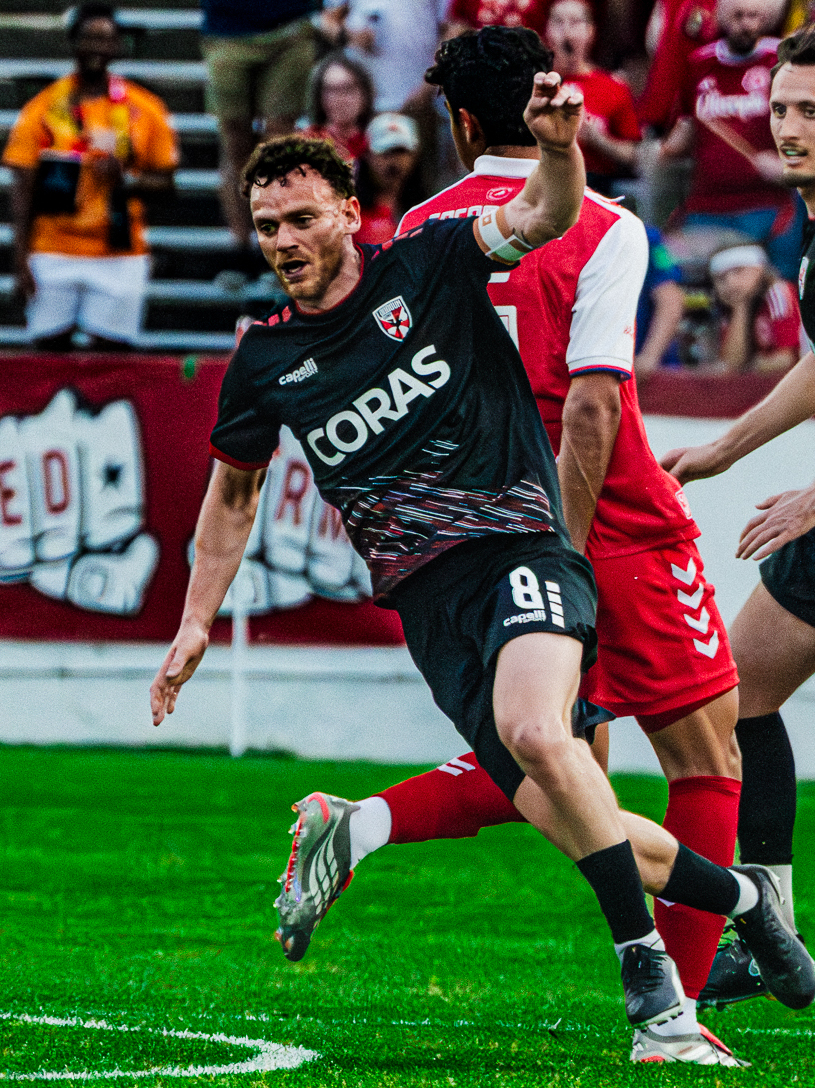
- Murphy with Loudoun United FC in 2026

Personal information
- Full name: James Vincent Murphy
- Date of birth: September 17, 1997 (age 29)
- Place of birth: Scotch Plains, New Jersey, U.S.
- Height: 5 ft 11 in (1.80 m)
- Position: Midfielder

Team information
- Current team: Loudoun United
- Number: 8

Youth career
- 2005–2016: Players Development Academy

Senior career*
Years	Team	Apps	(Gls)
2016–2018	Sheffield Wednesday	0	(0)
2018	Los Angeles FC	0	(0)
2018	→ Las Vegas Lights (loan)	7	(0)
2019–2020	Arbroath	17	(0)
2020–2021	Rio Grande Valley FC	36	(0)
2022–2023	Monterey Bay	57	(1)
2024	Detroit City	32	(0)
2025	Indy Eleven	30	(1)
2026–	Loudoun United	29	(2)

International career
2015	United States U20	5	(0)
- * Club domestic league appearances and goals as of 12:18, 8 November 2026 (UTC)~

James Murphy (born September 17, 1997) is an American professional soccer player who plays as a midfielder for USL Championship club Loudoun United.

Murphy grew up in Scotch Plains, New Jersey and attended Scotch Plains-Fanwood High School, where he was named as the 2013–14 Gatorade New Jersey Boys Soccer Player of the Year.

== Club career ==
=== United States ===
Murphy came through the ranks at the Players Development Academy in his home state of New Jersey. He played for the United States under-20 team during the 2015 Stevan Vilotic Tournament and 2015 Four Nations Tournament. Also in 2015, Murphy went on trial with the Philadelphia Union of MLS but ended up not signing with the club.

=== Sheffield Wednesday ===
Murphy signed a professional contract for Sheffield Wednesday in June 2016.

In August 2016 he made his first team debut for the club, coming on as a substitute as Wednesday lost to Cambridge United in the first round of the Football League Cup.

=== Los Angeles FC ===
Murphy joined MLS side Los Angeles FC on March 2, 2018, ahead of their inaugural season. On May 22, 2018, he made his LAFC debut in a friendly against Borussia Dortmund.

=== Las Vegas Lights FC ===
Murphy joined USL side Las Vegas Lights FC on June 22, 2018, on a short-term loan. He had his first assist in his debut with the club on June 24, 2018, against Swope Park Rangers.

=== Arbroath ===
After a trial spell, Murphy signed with Scottish Championship club Arbroath in July 2019.

=== Rio Grande Valley FC ===
In July 2020, returned to the United States, joining USL Championship side Rio Grande Valley FC.

=== Monterey Bay FC ===
Murphy signed with USL Championship expansion side Monterey Bay FC on February 8, 2022. Murphy was included in the starting 11 for Monterey Bay's inaugural match, a 4–2 loss to Phoenix Rising FC. Murphy's contract option was declined following the 2023 USL Championship season.

=== Detroit City FC ===
Murphy signed a two-year contract with Detroit City on January 25, 2024. Detroit declined his contract option following their 2024 season.

=== Indy Eleven ===
Murphy joined Indy Eleven on January 29, 2025 ahead of their 2025 season. He made his debut for the club on March 15, 2025, in a 1–3 victory over Miami FC in the USL Championship. Murphy scored his first goal for the club in a 2–4 away loss to North Carolina FC on July 18, 2025. He ended the season with 36 appearances and one goal in all competitions, exiting the club in December 2025 upon the expiry of his contract.

=== Loudoun United ===
On January 15, 2026, Murphy made the move to USL Championship side Loudoun United.

== Personal life ==
Murphy has an older sister, Casey, and two younger brothers, John and Owen. Both brothers also play soccer, with John Murphy being a player for One Knoxville SC, and Owen being of the Montclair University soccer team.

== Career statistics ==
As of match played October 25, 2025.

Club	Season	League			Cup		League Cup		Other		Total	
Club	Season	Division	App	Goals	App	Goals	App	Goals	App	Goals	App	Goals
Sheffield Wednesday	2016–17	EFL Championship	0	0	0	0	1	0	0	0	1	0
Sheffield Wednesday	2017–18	EFL Championship	0	0	0	0	0	0	0	0	0	0
Sheffield Wednesday	Total		0	0	0	0	1	0	0	0	1	0
Los Angeles FC	2018	Major League Soccer	0	0	0	0	0	0	0	0	0	0
Las Vegas Lights FC (loan)	2018	USL Championship	7	0	0	0	0	0	0	0	7	0
Arbroath	2019–20	Scottish Championship	17	0	1	2	2	2	2 (Note: Appearance in the Scottish Challenge Cup)	0	22	4
Rio Grande Valley	2020	USL Championship	11	0	0	0	0	0	0	0	11	0
Rio Grande Valley	2021	USL Championship	25	0	0	0	0	0	0	0	25	0
Rio Grande Valley	Total		36	0	0	0	0	0	0	0	36	0
Monterey Bay FC	2022	USL Championship	31	1	1	0	0	0	0	0	32	1
Monterey Bay FC	2023	USL Championship	26	0	2	0	0	0	0	0	28	0
Monterey Bay FC	Total		57	1	3	0	0	0	0	0	60	1
Detroit City FC	2024	USL Championship	32	0	3	0	1	0	0	0	36	0
Indy Eleven	2025	USL Championship	30	1	1	0	5	0	0	0	36	1
Career total			179	1	8	2	9	2	2	0	198	6
