= Brad Dunwell =

American soccer player (born 1996)

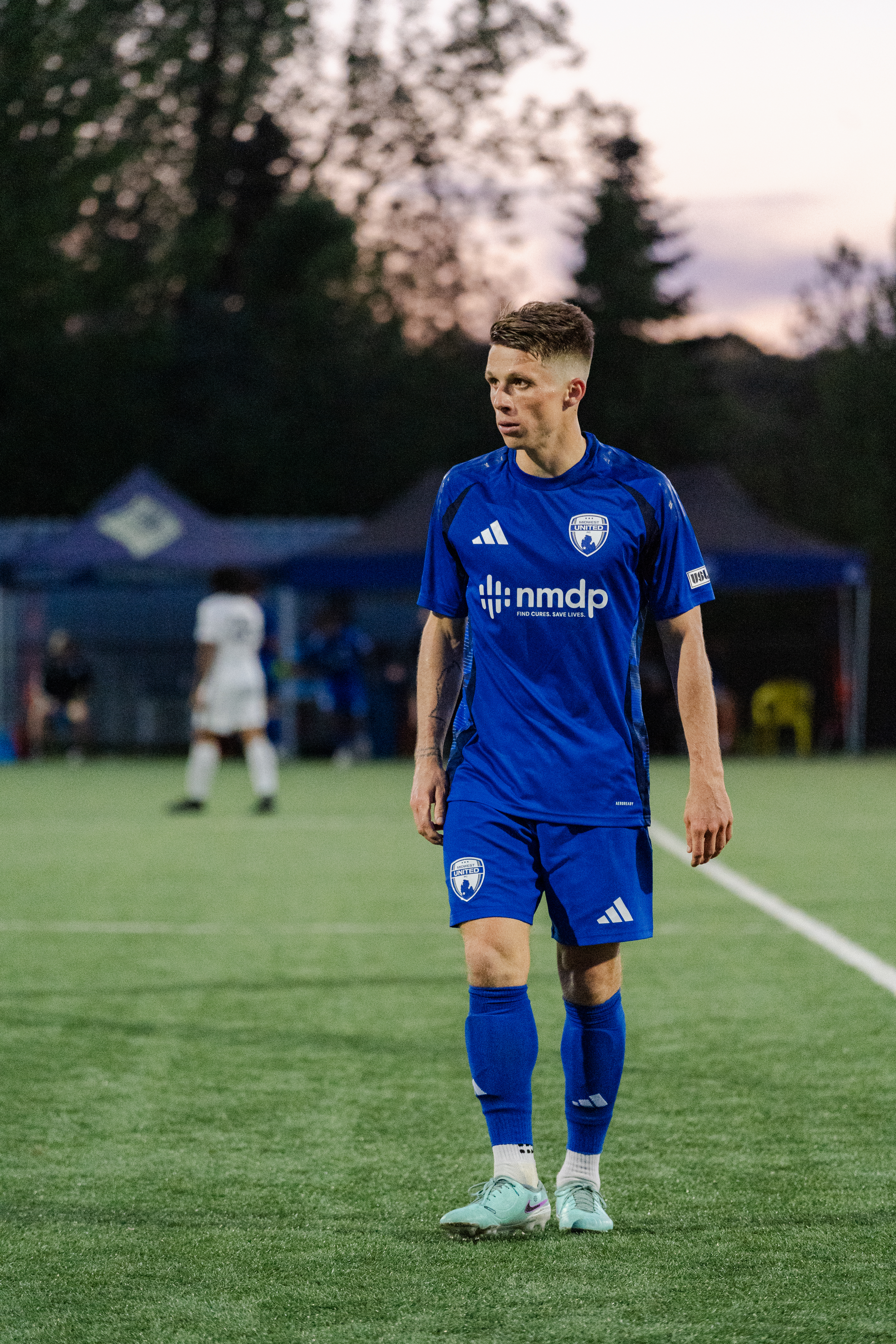

Personal information
- Full name: Bradley Dunwell
- Date of birth: December 31, 1996 (age 29)
- Place of birth: Grand Rapids, Michigan, United States
- Height: 5 ft 8 in (1.73 m)
- Position: Defensive midfielder

Youth career
- 2011–2013: Chicago Fire

College career
Years	Team	Apps	(Gls)
2015–2018	Wake Forest Demon Deacons	91	(1)

Senior career*
Years	Team	Apps	(Gls)
2015–2018	Michigan Bucks	37	(0)
2019	Rio Grande Valley FC	5	(0)
2020–2021	Oklahoma City Energy	35	(0)
2022	Detroit City	20	(0)
2023	Charlotte Independence	31	(1)
2024	Midwest United FC	12	(0)
- * Club domestic league appearances and goals

Brad Dunwell (born December 31, 1996) is an American former professional soccer player who currently coaches Detroit City FC II and serves as an assistant for the first team.

== Career ==
=== Youth and college ===
Dunwell played four years of college soccer at Wake Forest University between 2015 and 2018, starting in all 91 games, scoring a single goal and tallying 14 assists. Led the Deacs to a 73-11-7 record in his four seasons, more wins than any other Division I program in that time. Dunwell received All-ACC athletic and academic honors every season along with United Soccer Coaches All-America Second Team in 2018.

While at college, Dunwell appeared for USL Premier Development League side Michigan Bucks between 2015 and 2018. The Bucks finished first in the Great Lakes conference in 2015, 2016, and 2017. Dunwell won a PDL Championship with the Bucks in 2016 with a 16-2-0 record.

=== Professional ===
On January 14, 2019, Dunwell was selected 56th overall in the 2019 MLS SuperDraft by Houston Dynamo. On March 8, 2019, Dunwell signed for Houston's USL Championship affiliate side Rio Grande Valley FC. Dunwell was released by the Toros at the end of the season.

On January 10, 2020, Dunwell signed with USL Championship side Oklahoma City Energy. Energy FC announced they would be suspending play for the 2022 USL Championship season.

On January 21, 2022, Dunwell signed with Detroit City ahead of their inaugural USL Championship season. He left Detroit following their 2022 season.

Dunwell signed with USL League One side Charlotte Independence on February 21, 2023.

Dunwell signed with USL League Two side Midwest United FC as a player-assistant coach on May 1, 2024. He served as one of the team's captains for the 2024 season and helped lead the club to its first-ever USL League Two playoff appearance.
