= Daniel Espeleta =

American soccer player

Personal information
- Full name: Daniel Francisco Espeleta Quirós
- Date of birth: April 5, 1998 (age 28)
- Place of birth: Athens, Georgia, United States
- Height: 1.75 m (5 ft 9 in)
- Position: Midfielder

Team information
- Current team: Uruguay

Youth career
- Tucson Soccer Academy
- Saprissa
- Seattle Sounders
- Pacific Northwest SC
- Saprissa
- Uruguay

College career
Years	Team	Apps	(Gls)
2018–2021	Creighton Bluejays	62	(5)
2022	Fordham Rams	15	(3)

Senior career*
Years	Team	Apps	(Gls)
2016–2017	Uruguay		
2018	Laredo Heat		
2022	Manhattan SC	6	(1)
2023	Los Angeles Force	3	(0)
2023	Grecia	4	(0)
2024	Detroit City	11	(0)
2025–	Uruguay	0	(0)
- * Club domestic league appearances and goals as of October 27, 2024

Daniel Francisco Espeleta Quirós (born April 5, 1998) is an American soccer player who currently plays for Uruguay in the Segunda División de Costa Rica.

== Career ==
=== Youth, college and amateur ===
Espeleta was born in Athens, Georgia, to Costa Rican parents. During his childhood he attended 10 different schools, regularly moving between Costa Rica and various US states, eventually moving to Washington, where he spent time with Seattle Sounders FC's under-15 team. He was also a two-time King County Conference All-Star Selection while playing for Mercer Island High School. Espeleta was a member of the Deportivo Saprissa youth setup, appearing with various youth teams between under-14 to under-20 level, helping the squad to pair of national championships. He also spent two years with Pacific Northwest Soccer Club at under-18 level. Before heading to college, he played for the senior team at C.S. Uruguay de Coronado in the Segunda División de Costa Rica.

In 2018, Espeleta attended Creighton University to play college soccer. Over four seasons with the Bluejays, Espeleta made 62 appearances, scoring five goals and tallying three assists. He was twice named CoSIDA Academic All-District VII First Team. He was a graduate transfer to Fordham University in 2022, where he appeared 15 times, scoring three times and adding three assists.

While at college, Espeleta also played in the National Premier Soccer League with Laredo Heat during their 2018 season. In 2022, Espeleta made seven appearances in the USL League Two over the regular season and playoffs with Manhattan SC.

=== Professional ===
Following college, Espeleta trialed with MLS Next Pro side Sporting Kansas City II, but wasn't signed by the team. His first professional contract was with National Independent Soccer Association side Los Angeles Force, who he made three appearances for in May and June 2023. In late 2023, Espeleta joined Liga FPD side Municipal Grecia on a short-term deal, where he made five appearances across league and cup. On March 5, 2024, Espeleta returned to the United States, signing for USL Championship side Detroit City FC following a successful trial. Detroit declined his contract option following their 2024 season.

== International ==
Espeleta was part of the Costa Rica under-17 camp in 2014.
