= Ryan Shellow =

American soccer player (born 1997)

Personal information
- Date of birth: October 10, 1997 (age 29)
- Place of birth: Miami, Florida, United States
- Height: 1.83 m (6 ft 0 in)
- Position: Goalkeeper

Youth career
- –2013: Pinecrest Premier SC
- 2013–2016: Kendall SC

College career
| Years | Team | Apps | (Gls) |
| 2016–2019 | Cornell Big Red | 47 | (0) |

Senior career*
| Years | Team | Apps | (Gls) |
| 2017–2018 | Weston FC | 7 | (0) |
| 2019 | Lakeland Tropics | 4 | (0) |
| 2021 | FC Tucson | 0 | (0) |
| 2022–2023 | Detroit City | 3 | (0) |
| 2024 | Richmond Kickers | 5 | (0) |
| Total | | 19 | (0) |
- * Club domestic league appearances and goals

Ryan Shellow (born October 10, 1997) is an American former professional soccer player who played as a goalkeeper.

== Career ==
=== Youth and college ===
Shellow played two years of high school soccer at Gulliver Preparatory School, before playing club soccer with Pinecrest Premier SC and later USSDA side Kendall SC, where he stayed for three years. At Pinecrest, Shellow captained the side as they played in the Region III Premier League and National League. He was also a member of the Florida Olympic Development State Team, and was named an Interregional All-Star at the 2010 Thanksgiving Showcase.

Shellow played college soccer at Cornell University, where he made 47 appearances with the Big Red in four seasons. Shellow led the Ivy League in total saves in two of his four seasons, making 70 saves in his freshman and junior seasons. For his senior year campaign, Shellow started in 12 games, only allowing 13 goals, making 31 saves, and finishing the season with a .705 save percentage.

While at college, Shellow also appeared in the USL League Two with Weston FC and Lakeland Tropics.

=== FC Tucson ===
On February 22, 2021, Shellow signed his first professional contract with USL League One side FC Tucson. However, he didn't appear for Tucson during 2021 and wasn't announced as a returnee at the conclusion of the season.

=== Detroit City ===
On March 11, 2022, USL Championship side Detroit City announced they'd signed Shellow to a one-year deal. He made his professional debut on September 10, 2022, starting in a 2–1 win over Colorado Springs Switchbacks. On March 6, 2023, Detroit announced Shellow had re-signed with the club for their 2023 season. He left Detroit following their 2023 season.

=== Richmond Kickers ===
On February 1, 2024, Shellow signed with USL League One side Richmond Kickers ahead of their 2024 season.He would retire at the end of the season.
