= Matthew Sheldon =

American soccer player (born 1992)

Personal information
- Date of birth: August 23, 1992 (age 34)
- Place of birth: Bellevue, Washington, U.S.
- Height: 6 ft 0 in (1.83 m)
- Position: Right-back

College career
Years	Team	Apps	(Gls)
2011–2014	UC Davis Aggies	61	(17)

Senior career*
Years	Team	Apps	(Gls)
2014	San Jose Earthquakes U23	14	(6)
2015	Ventura County Fusion	11	(0)
2016	Orange County Blues U23	1	(0)
2016	SG Kinzenbach	13	(1)
2016	Orange County Blues	16	(0)
2017	Saint Louis FC	12	(0)
2018	Waterside Karori	7	(0)
2019–2021	FC Tulsa	64	(2)
2022	Charleston Battery	29	(0)
2023	Hartford Athletic	29	(1)
2024–2025	Detroit City	45	(1)
Total		241	(11)
- * Club domestic league appearances and goals

Matthew Sheldon (born August 23, 1992) is an American former professional soccer player who primarily played as a right-back.

== Early life ==
Sheldon was born on August 23, 1992, in Bellevue, Washington, United States. He grew up in Portland, Oregon, and was one of three children in his family. Sheldon played recreational soccer until 5th grade, when he joined his first club team. He also played basketball, baseball and American football.

Sheldon attended Lincoln High School in Portland, Oregon. Alongside high school soccer, he played for Westside Metros Remix FC.

== College career ==
During his senior year, Sheldon received athletic scholarships from both UC Davis and Oregon State, as well as a roster spot from Gonzaga. He committed to play for UC Davis.

Sheldon played college soccer at UC Davis between 2011 and 2014. He spent time in the Premier Development League with San Jose Earthquakes U23 in 2014, Ventura County Fusion in 2015, and briefly with Orange County Blues U-23 in 2016, before moving to Germany with sixth-tier side SG Kinzenbach.

== Club career ==
Sheldon signed with United Soccer League club Orange County Blues in July 2016, making his professional debut on July 10, 2016, in a 3–3 draw with Sacramento Republic.

In November 2016, Sheldon announced that he would play for Saint Louis FC for the 2017 USL season.

In March 2018, it was announced Sheldon would play for amateur club side Waterside Karori in Wellington, New Zealand.

On January 14, 2019, the Tulsa Roughnecks FC announced that they had signed Sheldon for their 2019 season. On December 10, 2019, it was announced that Tulsa, now rebranded as FC Tulsa, had re-signed Sheldon to their roster for the 2020 USL Championship season. On December 15, 2020, it was announced that FC Tulsa, had re-signed Sheldon to their roster for the 2021 USL Championship season following a successful campaign with the club in 2020.

On December 30, 2021, it was announced that Sheldon had signed a contract with the Charleston Battery ahead of the 2022 USL Championship season. Following the 2022 season, Sheldon was released by Charleston.

On January 31, 2023, Sheldon was announced as a new signing for USL Championship side Hartford Athletic on a one-year deal.

Sheldon joined Detroit City on January 24, 2024. A corresponding transaction saw Skage Simonsen join Hartford from Detroit.

On November 24, 2025, Sheldon announced his retirement from professional soccer. In an emotional video posted to his Youtube channel Become Elite, he stated that he was retiring to devote more time to his family.

== Personal life ==
Matthew Sheldon

YouTube information
- Channel: Become Elite
- Years active: 2015–present
- Genres: vlog; sports
- Subscribers: 710 thousand
- Views: 96.4 million
- Last updated: 24 November 2025

Sheldon operates a YouTube called Become Elite, which has more 700,000 subscribers in December 2025, and podcast called Against All Odds. By May 2018 his videos had over 18 million views and he was one of YouTube's most popular vloggers.

He married his partner, Mimi Estelle, on December 4, 2021. Together, the couple have two daughters.

When asked who motivated him to become a soccer player, Sheldon cited his parents as a motivation to become a professional athlete, he stated in an interview "My parents were the biggest supporters of my athletic career since the start. My Dad pushed me to go for a D1 scholarship when I was unsure of my capabilities. They supported me every step of the way, and without them I don't know if I would have even made it to Varsity High School soccer. Having the belief of your parents is such a huge motivation as a young athlete".
