= Devon Amoo-Mensah =

American soccer player (born 1995)

Personal information
- Date of birth: November 27, 1995 (age 30)
- Place of birth: Naperville, Illinois, United States
- Height: 1.85 m (6 ft 1 in)
- Position: Defender

Team information
- Current team: Detroit City
- Number: 30

Youth career
- Naperville Central
- Chicago Fire
- Sockers FC

College career
Years	Team	Apps	(Gls)
2014-2018	Lewis Flyers	73	(8)

Senior career*
Years	Team	Apps	(Gls)
2019	FK Älmeboda/Linneryd		
2020–2021	Michigan Stars	35	(2)
2022–	Detroit City FC	137	(3)
- * Club domestic league appearances and goals as of November 4, 2026

Devon Amoo-Mensah (born November 27, 1995) is an American soccer player who plays as a defender for Detroit City FC in the USL Championship.

== College Career ==
Amoo-Mensah played 5 years of soccer for the Flyers of Lewis University where he was a two-time All-Great Lakes Valley Conference selection.

== Club Career ==
On January 19, 2022, Detroit City FC of the USL Championship announced they had signed Amoo-Mensah to a contract for the 2022 season.

Amoo-Mensah won the 2023 Black Arrow Award, named for DCFC's Players' Player of the year. Detroit City exercised his contract option ahead of the 2024 season, and Amoo-Mensah signed a new contract ahead of the 2025 season.

Following the 2026 season, Amoo-Mensah was named USL Championship Defender of the Year.

== Honors ==
Individual

- USL Championship Defender of the Year: 2026
