= Yazeed Matthews =

South African soccer player

Personal information
- Date of birth: 22 April 1996 (age 30)
- Place of birth: Johannesburg, South Africa
- Height: 1.85 m (6 ft 1 in)
- Position: Forward

College career
Years	Team	Apps	(Gls)
2015–2016	Tyler Apaches	45	(36)
2017–2018	Coastal Carolina Chanticleers	30	(16)

Senior career*
Years	Team	Apps	(Gls)
2019	AFC Ann Arbor	11	(5)
2019–2021	Detroit City	26	(6)
2022–2024	Detroit City	48	(3)
- * Club domestic league appearances and goals as of 26 October 2024

Yazeed Matthews (born 22 April 1996) is a South African soccer player.

== Career ==
=== College and amateur ===
Matthews began playing college soccer in the United States at Tyler Junior College, where he went on to score 36 goals and tally 12 assists in 45 appearances. He was named the NJCAA National Player of the Year following the 2016 season, and led Tyler to the 2016 National Junior College Championship after finishing as the runners up in 2015. In 2017, he transferred to Coastal Carolina University, where he netted 16 times in 30 appearances for the Chanticleers.

Following college, Matthews signed with National Premier Soccer League side AFC Ann Arbor, scoring five goals in 11 regular season games. After his 2019 season, he signed with Detroit City in the National Independent Soccer Association.

=== Professional ===
On 13 August 2022, Matthews returned to Detroit City halfway during their USL Championship season. On November 20, 2023, DCFC announced that they had exercised his contract option for the 2024 season. Matthews left Detroit following their 2024 season.
