= Nate Steinwascher =

American soccer player (born 1993)

Personal information
- Full name: Nathan Enrique Steinwascher
- Date of birth: February 15, 1993 (age 33)
- Place of birth: Sterling Heights, Michigan, United States
- Height: 1.83 m (6 ft 0 in)
- Position: Goalkeeper

Youth career
- –2011: Michigan Wolves-Hawks

College career
Years	Team	Apps	(Gls)
2011–2015	Detroit Mercy Titans	73	(0)

Senior career*
Years	Team	Apps	(Gls)
2016–2019	Detroit Waza Flo (indoor)	14	(0)
2016–2018	Detroit City		
2018	Grythyttans IF		
2019–2024	Detroit City	114	(1)
- * Club domestic league appearances and goals as of October 19, 2024

Nathan Enrique Steinwascher (born February 15, 1993) is an American former professional soccer player who played as a goalkeeper.

== Professional career ==
=== Detroit City FC ===
Steinwascher made his USL Championship debut against San Antonio FC on March 12, 2022. Steinwascher would go on to claim the USL Championship Save of the Month Award for March 2022 on April 11, 2022, for saving a penalty taken by PC in Steinwascher's debut. Steinwascher would help DCFC into the playoffs later that season, only to come up short in the first round. In the 2023 season, Steinwascher would again back DCFC up to a playoff spot, as he was one of four DCFC players, along with Connor Rutz, Maxi Rodriguez, and captain Stephen Carroll as the club's first-ever "City Centurions". This time in the playoffs, Steinweischer and DCFC would win, beating Pittsburgh Riverhounds SC, the best team in the league that season, in the first round @ Pittsburgh before losing to Louisville City FC 4–0, also on the road. On December 11, 2023, DCFC came out with an announcement that Steinwascher had agreed to a new, two-year guaranteed contract that would run through the 2025 season. Steinwascher announced his retirement from professional soccer on December 17, 2024.
