= Stephen Carroll (footballer) =

Irish footballer

Personal information
- Date of birth: 30 November 1993 (age 32)
- Place of birth: Cork, Ireland
- Height: 1.85 m (6 ft 1 in)
- Position: Defender

Youth career
- –2006: Wilton United
- 2006–2010: Ballincollig AFC
- 2010–2012: Cork City

College career
Years	Team	Apps	(Gls)
2014–2015	MMC RedHawks	20	(5)
2016–2018	Davenport Panthers	55	(8)

Senior career*
Years	Team	Apps	(Gls)
2012–2013	Cork City	0	(0)
2013	→ College Corinthians (loan)		
2013–2014	Carrigaline United AFC		
2016	Muskegon Risers		
2017–2025	Detroit City	164+	(13+)
- * Club domestic league appearances and goals as of 26 October 2025

Stephen Carroll (born 30 November 1993) is a retired Irish footballer who was the captain for Detroit City in the USL Championship.

== Career ==
=== Early career ===
Carroll played in his native Ireland with Wilton United, also playing both football and Gaelic football with Ballincollig until he was 16-years old, before joining the Cork City academy. He appeared on the bench for Cork's senior team in 2012, before going on loan to College Corinthians in the Munster Senior League. A spell at Carrigaline United in the Munster First Division followed in 2013, who he helped to promotion.

=== College in the United States ===
In 2014, Carroll was recruited by Martin Methodist College in Pulaski, Tennessee and offered a scholarship. In his first game at Martin Methodist, Carroll dislocated his knee and required surgery. He played 20 games in 2015, scoring five goals and was named First Team All-Southern States Athletic Conference.

Carroll transferred to Davenport University in 2016, where he went on to make 55 appearances over three seasons, scoring eight goals and tallying two assists. In 2016, Carroll was named First Team All-Wolverine Hoosier Athletic Conference, 2017 saw him named GLIAC Defensive Player of the Year and First Team All-GLIAC whilst helping the Panthers to the GLIAC championship, and was named on the D2CCA All-Midwest Region first team.

In 2016, Carroll played with amateur side Muskegon Risers.

=== Detroit City ===
In 2017, Carroll made the move to amateur side Detroit City FC, who at the time competed in the NPSL. He remained with the club through to 2020 in the NPSL, as well as their spell in the NISA, winning numerous titles with the club, being named captain in 2019.

On 10 January 2022, Carroll was re-signed by Detroit as they made the move to the fully professional USL Championship. On October 14, 2023, Carroll, along with teammates Nate Steinwascher, Connor Rutz, and Maxi Rodriguez were honored as "City Centurions" for playing in at least 100 games with the club.

On 19 November 2025, Carroll's retirement from professional football was announced, along with a move to Detroit City's front office.
