= Keyworth Stadium =

Multi-purpose stadium in Hamtramck, Michigan

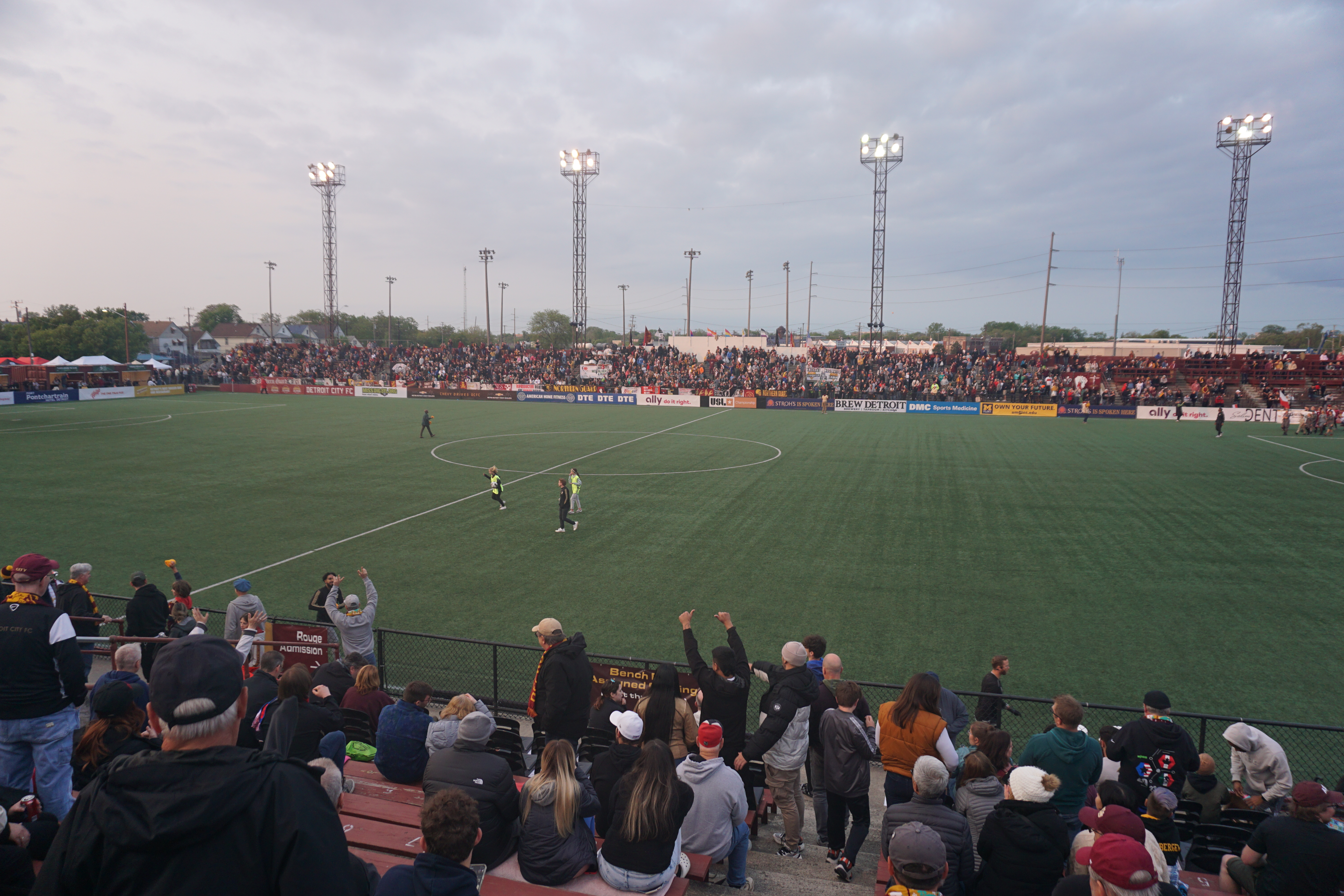
- Keyworth Stadium during the Detroit City FC v. San Antonio FC soccer match on May 20, 2023

- Location in Wayne County Location in Michigan
- Interactive map showing stadium location
- Location: 3201 Roosevelt St, Hamtramck, MI 48212
- Coordinates: 42°23′32″N 83°02′56″W
- Owner: Hamtramck Public Schools
- Capacity: 7,933

Construction
- Built: October 15, 1936
- Renovated: 2016

Tenants
- Hamtramck Public Schools 1936–present Wayne Tartars (NCAA) 1946–1949; Detroit City FC (USLC) 2016–present

Keyworth Stadium is a 7,933 seat multi-purpose stadium located in Hamtramck, Michigan, an enclave of Detroit. It was opened by former president Franklin Delano Roosevelt on October 15, 1936, during his second campaign for president. Keyworth was the first Works Progress Administration project in the state of Michigan.

Democratic Senator John F. Kennedy spoke at Keyworth Stadium during his successful 1960 presidential campaign.

The stadium is owned by Hamtramck Public Schools and it is currently used mostly for soccer and American football games.

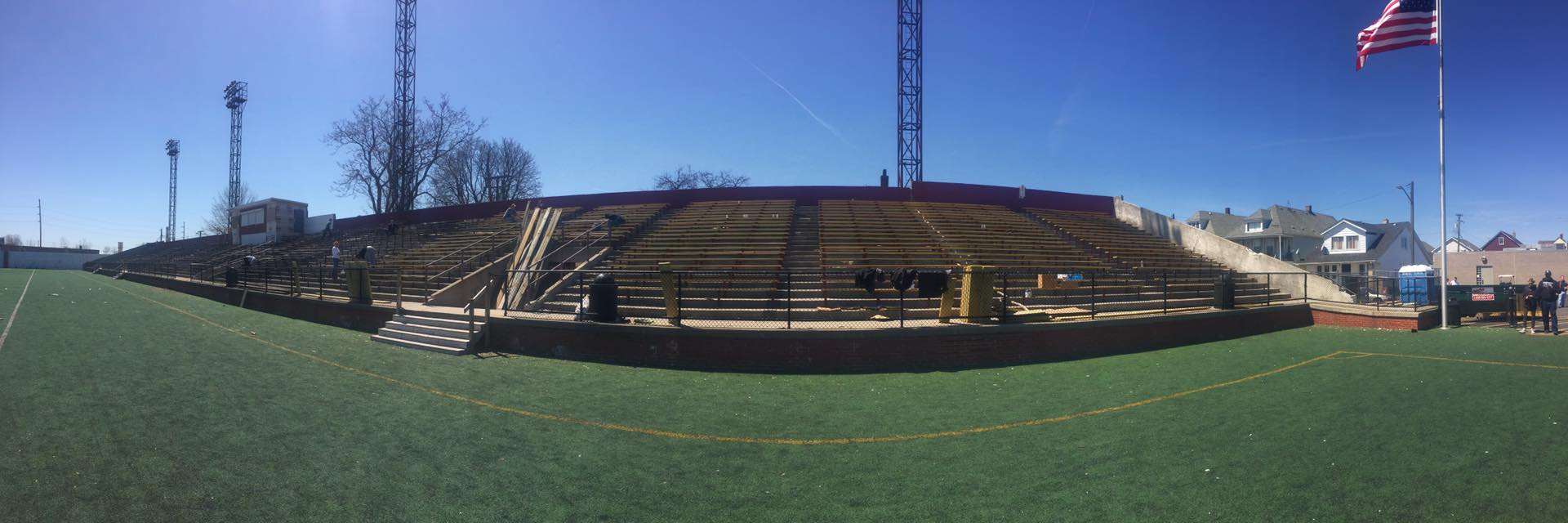
Panoramas of the west grandstands undergoing renovations in preparation for the 2016 season (above) and the view of the pitch and east grandstands, used by supporters, during the same (below).

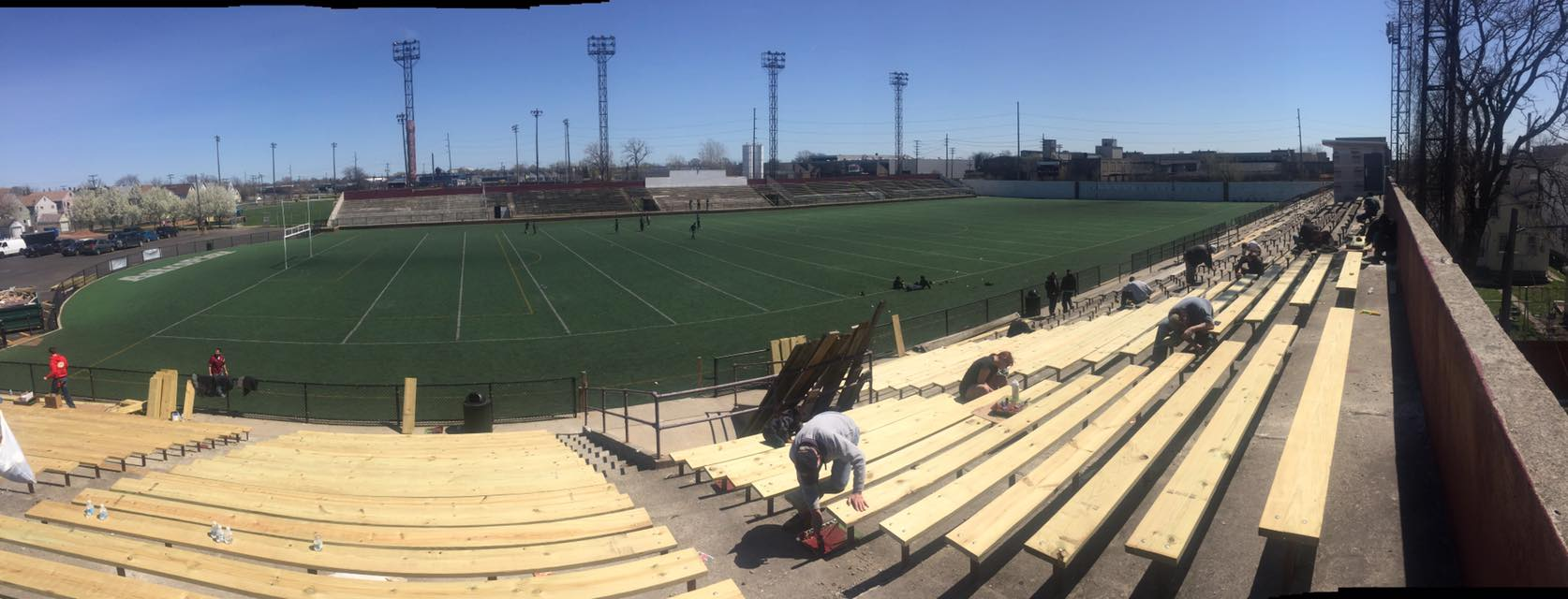

The professional soccer club Detroit City FC initiated a crowd-based investment program to renovate and rehabilitate the stadium, intending to move their home games to the stadium in 2016. On February 5, 2016, Detroit City FC owners announced that they had successfully raised the minimum $400,000 to begin renovations, with the investment drive topping off at $741,250 by the midnight deadline on February 15, 2016.

The club played their first game at their new home on May 20, 2016.

DCFC set a new club attendance record of 7,887 in a 0–10 loss to Serie A side Frosinone Calcio on July 31, 2018.

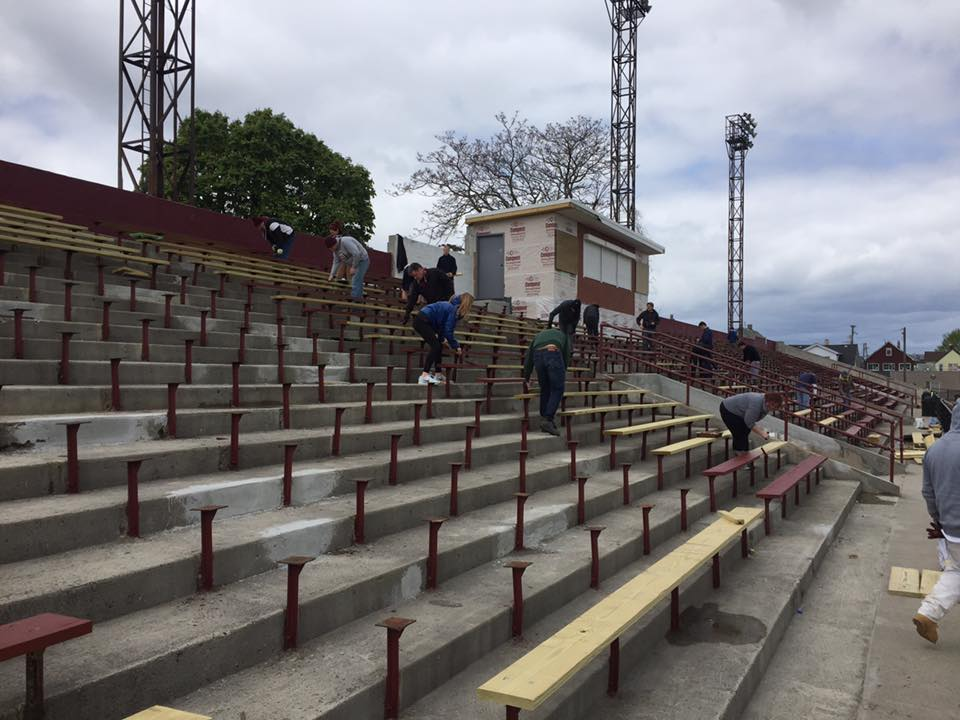
Volunteer fans of Detroit City FC work on refurbishing the west grandstand of Keyworth Stadium

On September 11, 2020, the National Independent Soccer Association announced that Keyworth Stadium would host the 2020 NISA Fall Playoffs. The tournament took place behind closed doors owing to the then on-going COVID-19 pandemic in Michigan.
