= Rhys Williams (soccer, born 1995) =

American soccer player (born 1995)

Personal information
- Date of birth: August 9, 1995 (age 31)
- Place of birth: White Plains, New York, United States
- Height: 5 ft 2 in (1.57 m)
- Positions: Winger; midfielder

Team information
- Current team: Detroit City FC
- Number: 2

Youth career
- Weston FC

College career
Years	Team	Apps	(Gls)
2013–2016	Columbia Lions	49	(7)

Senior career*
Years	Team	Apps	(Gls)
2014–2016	New York Red Bulls U-23		
2017	New York Cosmos B	9	(1)
2018	Real Monarchs	6	(0)
2019	Lansing Ignite	21	(1)
2020	South Georgia Tormenta	10	(0)
2021	Stumptown AC	28	(3)
2022–	Detroit City	124	(3)
- * Club domestic league appearances and goals as of November 4, 2026

Rhys Williams (born August 9, 1995) is an American professional soccer player who plays as a winger or midfielder for Detroit City FC in the USL Championship.

== Career ==
=== College and PDL ===
Williams played college soccer at Columbia University between 2013 and 2016.

While at college, Williams appeared for New York Red Bulls U-23 in both the National Premier Soccer League and the Premier Development League.

=== Professional ===
Following college in April 2017, Williams signed a professional contract with National Premier Soccer League side New York Cosmos B.

On February 15, 2018, Williams signed with United Soccer League side Real Monarchs.

On January 14, 2019, Williams joined USL League One side Lansing Ignite ahead of their inaugural 2019 season.

Williams signed with South Georgia Tormenta of USL League One on January 14, 2020.

In April 2021, Williams joined National Independent Soccer Association side Stumptown AC ahead of the spring 2021 season.

In January 2022, Williams joined USL Championship side Detroit City FC ahead of the 2022 season. Williams helped DCFC get into the playoffs in the '22 season, in '23, where they won their first playoff game since joining the league, and in '24. On September 22, it was announced that Williams had played his 100th game for the club, becoming the club's 6th city centurion in club history and 2nd to gain that honor in the season, a week behind teammate Michael Bryant.
