= Abdoulaye Diop (footballer) =

Senegalese footballer (born 1999)

Personal information
- Date of birth: September 17, 1999 (age 27)
- Place of birth: Dakar, Senegal
- Height: 1.90 m (6 ft 3 in)
- Position: Midfielder

Team information
- Current team: Detroit City
- Number: 8

Youth career
- 2013–2017: Montverde Academy
- 2017–2018: Orlando City

College career
Years	Team	Apps	(Gls)
2019	EFSC Titans	17	(4)

Senior career*
Years	Team	Apps	(Gls)
2019	Detroit City	12	(1)
2020–2021	Atlanta United 2	26	(1)
2022–	Detroit City	125	(5)
- * Club domestic league appearances and goals as of November 4, 2026

Abdoulaye Diop (born 17 September 1999) is a Senegalese footballer who plays for Detroit City in the USL Championship.

== Career ==
=== Early career ===
Diop played soccer at the Montverde Academy and spent a season with the Orlando City SC academy during their 2017-18 season.

=== Eastern Florida State College ===
Diop played one season of college soccer at Eastern Florida State College in 2019, where he scored 4 goals and tallied 4 assists in 17 appearances.

=== Detroit City FC (first stint) ===
While at college, Diop also appeared for NPSL side Detroit City, making 12 regular season appearances, scoring 1 goal in a season where they won the Great Lakes Conference and progressed to the Regional Finals.

=== Atlanta United 2 ===
On 26 February 2020, it was announced that Diop would sign for USL Championship side Atlanta United 2. He made his debut for Atlanta on 11 July 2020, appearing as a 58th-minute substitute in a 2-1 loss against Tampa Bay Rowdies. Diop was released by Atlanta following the 2021 season.

=== Detroit City FC (second stint) ===
On 12 January 2022, Diop returned to Detroit City ahead of their inaugural USL Championship season. On November 30th, 2023, DCFC announced that they had exercised Diop's contract option for the 2024 season. After the 2024 season, it was announced that Detroit had signed Diop to an extension through 2026 with an option for the '27 season.

== Personal life ==
Born in Dakar, Senegal, Diop moved to Florida in the United States when he was 13 years old.
