= Maxi Rodriguez (American soccer) =

American soccer player (born 1995)

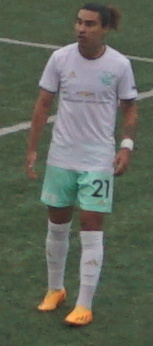
- Maxi playing for Detroit City FC in 2023

Personal information
- Full name: Maximiliano Rodriguez
- Date of birth: August 9, 1995 (age 31)
- Place of birth: San Antonio, Texas, United States
- Height: 5 ft 11 in (1.80 m)
- Position: Midfielder

Team information
- Current team: Detroit City FC

Youth career
- –2013: Classics Elite

College career
Years	Team	Apps	(Gls)
2013–2016	Charlotte 49ers	60	(2)

Senior career*
Years	Team	Apps	(Gls)
2017–2018	San Antonio	32	(1)
2019	Richmond Kickers	23	(1)
2021–2024	Detroit City	113	(27)
2025	Rhode Island	28	(4)
2026–	Detroit City	24	(3)
- * Club domestic league appearances and goals as of November 4, 2026

Maximiliano "Maxi" Rodriguez (born August 9, 1995) is an American professional soccer player who currently plays as a midfielder for Detroit City FC in the USL Championship.

== Career ==
=== College ===
Rodriguez played four years of college soccer at the University of North Carolina at Charlotte between 2013 and 2016.

=== Professional career ===
Rodriguez signed with San Antonio FC on February 22, 2017.

Rodriguez joined the Richmond Kickers on February 22, 2019. On March 30, 2019, Rodriguez made his Richmond debut scoring in a match against Lansing Ignite FC.

On March 22, 2021, Rodriguez signed with National Independent Soccer Association side Detroit City FC ahead of the 2021 season. Maxi stayed with DCFC as they made the jump to the USL Championship, and led DCFC to the playoffs in the first two seasons, winning their first playoff game in 2023 when they upset top-seeded Pittsburgh Riverhounds SC 1–0 in Pittsburgh, the team they had only tied at home the week prior where, during the game, Maxi was recognized as one of the 4 "City Centurions", along with teammates Nate Steinwascher, Connor Rutz, and captain Stephen Carroll, for playing at least 100 games with the club.

On December 3, 2024, it was announced that Rodriguez would join USL Championship side Rhode Island FC ahead of their 2025 season. He ended up making 38 apps, in which, in 2300+ minutes with the club, he scored 5 goals and tallied 7 assists, helping the club get a 7th seed in the Eastern Conference playoffs, falling to Pittsburgh, the eventual champions, in the conference finals.

On December 19, 2025, it was announced that Rodriguez would come back to Detroit City FC on a multi-year deal that saw him sign through the 2027 season.
