= Skage Simonsen =

Norwegian footballer (born 1998)

Personal information
- Full name: Skage Simonsen Lehland
- Date of birth: 12 April 1998 (age 28)
- Place of birth: Grimstad, Norway
- Height: 1.90 m (6 ft 3 in)
- Positions: Attacking midfielder; forward

Team information
- Current team: Djerv

Youth career
- –2014: Brann

College career
Years	Team	Apps	(Gls)
2018–2019	St. John's Red Storm	38	(9)
2020–2021	SMU Mustangs	27	(10)

Senior career*
Years	Team	Apps	(Gls)
2014–2015	Sandviken	27	(6)
2015–2017	Fana	38	(2)
2017	Os TF	7	(0)
2018	Varegg	5	(1)
2019	Lokomotiv Oslo	6	(5)
2021	NY Pancyprian-Freedoms		
2022	Loudoun United	25	(2)
2023	Detroit City	24	(3)
2024	Hartford Athletic	0	(0)
2024	NY Pancyprian-Freedoms		
2025	Djerv	0	(0)
- * Club domestic league appearances and goals as of 23 January 2025

Skage Simonsen Lehland (born 12 April 1998) is a Norwegian professional footballer who plays as an attacking midfielder for SK Djerv.

== Career ==
=== Early career & college ===
Simonsen played with SK Brann at youth level, before joining various lower league clubs in Norway, including Sandviken, Fana, Os TF, Krohnsminde (futsal), and Varegg.

In 2018, Simonsen moved to the United States to play college soccer at St. John's University. In two seasons in New York, Simonsen made 38 appearances, scoring nine goals and tallying ten assists. He was named Big East Freshman of Year in 2018 and All-Big East Second Team in both seasons. Simonsen transferred to Southern Methodist University in 2020, going on to score ten goals and add four assists to his name in 27 appearances for the Mustangs. He was named AAC First Team in both his seasons at SMU.

While at college, Simosen also traveled back to Norway during the summers to play with Lokomotiv Oslo, where he made six appearances and scored five goals in the Norwegian Third Division. In 2021, he played with fifth-tier US side NY Pancyprian-Freedoms.

=== Professional ===
On 11 January 2022, Simonsen was drafted 69th overall in the 2022 MLS SuperDraft by D.C. United. He signed with D.C. United's USL Championship affiliate side Loudoun United on 8 March 2022.

On 13 December 2022, Simonsen was announced as a new signing for USL Championship side Detroit City FC ahead of their 2023 season.

On 24 January 2024, Simonsen was transferred to Hartford Athletic in exchange for Matthew Sheldon. On 7 March, his contract was mutually terminated.

On 30 March 2025, Simonsen returned to Norway and joined SK Djerv.
