= 2020–21 Detroit City FC season =

American soccer team season

Detroit City FC
2020–21 season
- CEO: Sean Mann
- Manager: Trevor James
- Stadium: Keyworth Stadium
- NISA: Fall: 4th, Eastern Conf; Spring: 1st
- Playoffs: Fall: Champions; Spring: Ineligible; Season: Champions
- U.S. Open Cup: Cancelled
- Top goalscorer: League: Connor Rutz, Pato Botello Faz: 4 All: Shawn Lawson, Pato Botello Faz: 5
- Highest home attendance: 4,741
- Lowest home attendance: 1,530
- Average home league attendance: 3,209
- Biggest win: DCFC 3–0 NAFC (Sep. 5); Cal United 0–3 DCFC (May 12); DCFC 3–0 Force (Jun. 2)
- Biggest defeat: DCFC 0–2 CFC (Aug. 15); MSFC 2–0 DCFC (Sep. 21, Fall Playoffs)
Home colors	Away colors

The 2020–21 season was a championship winning season for Detroit City FC in the National Independent Soccer Association. This was the club's second professional season since being established in 2012, and their first full season in NISA.

After the cancellation of the 2020 NISA Spring season the association confirmed that the 2020–21 season would take place as normal, under local guidelines for social distancing and restrictions for fan attendance.

== Kits ==
The club wore different kits for the 2020 and 2021 portions of the season. Adidas was the supplier and Metro-Detroit Chevy Dealers was the sponsor through both halves of the season.

2020 Fall Competitions		2021 Spring Competitions	
Home	Away	Home	Away

== Roster ==
As of May 21, 2021.

No.	Pos.	Nat.	Name	Date of birth (age)	Since
1	GK	(United States)	Nathan Steinwascher	February 15, 1993 (age 33)	2016
2	DF	(United States)	James Filerman	November 11, 1996 (age 30)	2020
3	DF	(United States)	Javan Torre	October 20, 1993 (age 33)	2021
4	DF	(United States)	Anthony Manning	September 4, 1992 (age 34)	2021
5	DF	(Republic of Ireland)	Stephen Carroll (captain)	November 30, 1993 (age 32)	2017
6	FW	(Scotland)	Max Todd	March 5, 1996 (age 30)	2020
7	MF	(United States)	Roddy Green	September 26, 1997 (age 29)	2017
10	MF	(Liberia)	Cyrus Saydee	March 21, 1992 (age 34)	2012
11	FW	(United States)	Connor Rutz	April 9, 1997 (age 29)	2020
12	DF	(Zimbabwe)	Tendai Jirira	November 12, 1991 (age 35)	2019
13	GK	(United States)	Armando Quezada	July 6, 1994 (age 32)	2019
14	MF	(United States)	Javier Steinwascher	March 14, 1998 (age 28)	2021
15	DF	(United States)	Matt Lewis	August 1, 1996 (age 30)	2020
17	FW	(Hungary)	Benedek Tanyi	January 19, 2001 (age 25)	2020
19	FW	(Mexico)	Pato Botello Faz	September 8, 1996 (age 30)	2021
20	FW	(South Africa)	Yazeed Matthews	April 22, 1996 (age 30)	2019
21	MF	(United States)	Maxi Rodriguez	August 9, 1995 (age 31)	2021
23	FW	(Honduras)	Darwin Espinal	January 16, 1995 (age 31)	2021
22	DF	(United States)	Kevin Venegas	April 29, 1989 (age 37)	2020
47	MF	(Hungary)	Barnabas Tanyi	January 23, 2003 (age 23)	2021
99	MF	(Bulgaria)	George Chomakov	November 19, 1990 (age 35)	2014

== Coaching staff ==
Name	Position
(England) Trevor James	Head coach and general manager
(United States) Brie Gauna	Head athletic trainer
(Brazil) Armen Tonianse	Assistant and goalkeeper coach

== Transfers ==
=== In ===
Date from	Position	Player	Last team	Type	Ref.
August 11, 2020	GK	(Haiti) Jean Antoine	San Diego 1904 FC	Free transfer	
August 11, 2020	DF	(United States) James Filerman	Old Dominion Monarchs	Free transfer	
August 11, 2020	MF	(Hungary) Benedek Tanyi	Grosse Ile Red Devils	Free transfer	
August 11, 2020	FW	(United States) Elijah Rice	Stumptown Athletic	Free transfer	
August 11, 2020	FW	(United States) Ryan Peterson	Stumptown Athletic	Free transfer	
August 11, 2020	FW	(United States) Travis Bowen	FC Golden State	Free transfer	
August 14, 2020	MF	(Sierra Leone) Ibrahim Conteh	(Indonesia) Persipura Jayapura	Free transfer	
September 8, 2020	GK	(United States) Parker Siegfried	Tormenta FC	Free transfer	
September 11, 2020	FW	(Scotland) Max Todd	Detroit City FC (NPSL)	Free transfer	
September 21, 2020	DF	(United States) Brandon Clegg	James Madison Dukes	Free transfer	
February 15, 2021	DF	(United States) Anthony Manning	Indy Eleven	Free transfer	
February 19, 2021	DF	(United States) Javan Torre	Las Vegas Lights	Free transfer	
March 1, 2021	MF	(United States) Pablo Cruz	Las Vegas Lights	Free transfer	
March 22, 2021	MF	(Hungary) Barnabas Tanyi	Grosse Ile Red Devils	Free transfer	
March 22, 2021	MF	(United States) Maxi Rodriguez	Richmond Kickers	Free transfer	
March 29, 2021	DF	(United States) Matt Lewis	New York Cosmos	Free transfer	
March 30, 2021	MF	(United States) Javier Steinwascher	Oakland County FC	Free transfer	
April 16, 2021	FW	(Mexico) Pato Botello Faz	Tormenta FC	Free transfer	
April 20, 2021	GK	(United States) Armando Quezada	San Antonio FC	Free transfer	
April 30, 2021	DF	(United States) James Filerman	FC Tucson	Free transfer	
May 21, 2021	FW	(Honduras) Darwin Espinal	New York Cosmos	Free transfer	

=== Out ===
Date to	Position	Player	Next team	Type	Ref.
	MF	(United States) James Vaughan	Unattached	Released	
August 23, 2020	GK	(United States) Austin Rogers	(Kosovo) KF Vushtrria	Released	
November 2020	DF	(Ghana) Evans Frimpong	Unattached	Not re-signed	
November 2020	MF	(United States) Bakie Goodman	Unattached	Retired	
November 2020	FW	(Mexico) Javier Bautista	Joined Detroit City FC coaching staff	Retired	
November 2020	FW	(United States) Elijah Rice	Unattached		
November 2020	DF	(United States) Brandon Clegg	Unattached		
November 2020	FW	(United States) Travis Bowen	Unattached		
February 16, 2021	DF	(United States) James Filerman	FC Tucson	Not re-signed	
February 24, 2021	GK	(Haiti) Jean Antoine	California United Strikers FC	Not re-signed	
February 24, 2021	MF	(Sierra Leone) Ibrahim Conteh	(Bahrain) Al Ittifaq (Maqaba)	Free transfer	
March 2021	FW	(United States) Ryan Peterson	FC Motown	Not re-signed	
March 5, 2021	DF	(Chile) Sebastian Capozucchi	Chattanooga Red Wolves SC	Not re-signed	
March 17, 2021	GK	(United States) Parker Siegfried	Louisville City FC	Not re-signed	
April 2021	MF	(Ghana) Michael Kafari	New Amsterdam FC	Not re-signed	
April 29, 2021	FW	(Jamaica) Shawn Lawson	(Canada) Atlético Ottawa	Not re-signed	
During season	MF	(United States) Pablo Cruz	Unattached		

== Competitions ==
=== Friendlies ===
March 23, 2021 Mid-season	**Indy Eleven**	**3–1**	**Detroit City**	Westfield, Indiana
11:00 a.m. EDT	Arteaga 32' (pen.); Ayoze 78' (pen.), 90'	Report	Venegas 51'	Stadium: Grand Park Sports Campus; Attendance: 0
Note: Played behind closed doors

April 6, 2021 Mid-season	**Pittsburgh Riverhounds**	**0–0**	**Detroit City**	Pittsburgh, Pennsylvania
3:00 p.m. EDT		Report		Stadium: Highmark Stadium; Attendance: 0
Note: Played behind closed doors

=== 2020 NISA Independent Cup ===
The NISA Independent Cup was originally unveiled on April 27, 2020, following the 2020 Spring Season's cancellation, as a competition between NISA members and high level amateur clubs. On July 1, the regional tournament was officially announced as a 'pre-season event' with Detroit City taking part alongside three other association members.

Competing within the Great Lakes Region, The team was reunited with Rust Belt Derby rival FC Buffalo and Cleveland SC, against whom Detroit City had lost the 2019 NPSL Midwest Region Finals to in PKs.

==== Standings ====
Pos	Team	Pld	W	PW	PL	L	GF	GA	GD	Pts
1	Detroit City FC (C)	2	2	0	0	0	6	0	+6	**6**
2	Cleveland SC	2	1	0	0	1	3	4	−1	**3**
3	FC Buffalo	2	0	0	0	2	1	6	−5	**0**

Source: nisaofficial.com
Rules for classification: 1) points; 2) head to head; 3) goal differential.
(C) Champion

==== Matches ====
July 31, 2020 Match 1	**Detroit City**	**3–0**	**Cleveland SC**	Hamtramck, Michigan
19:30 EST	Peterson 42', (yellow card) 48'; Rutz 52'; Lawson 65'	Report; Broadcast	Termine (yellow card) 21'; Manfut (yellow card) 86'	Stadium: Keyworth Stadium; Attendance: 0 Referee: Nicole Green
Note: Game was played behind closed doors due to the COVID-19 pandemic

August 2, 2020 Match 2	**Detroit City**	**3–0**	**FC Buffalo**	Hamtramck, Michigan
15:00 EST	Matthews 15'; Lawson 31'; Rutz 36'	Report; Broadcast		Stadium: Keyworth Stadium; Attendance: 0
Note: Game was played behind closed doors due to the COVID-19 pandemic

=== 2020 NISA Fall Season ===
The schedule for the 2020 NISA Fall Season was released on 31 July 2020. The format consisted of a regionalized East/West divisional competition beginning 8 August, with Detroit playing in the Eastern Conference, and a single-location tournament to be held 21 September through 2 October, resulting in a single Fall champion.

Pos	Team	Pld	W	D	L	GF	GA	GD	Pts
1	Chattanooga FC	4	3	0	1	8	3	+5	**9**
2	Michigan Stars FC	4	2	2	0	6	2	+4	**8**
3	New York Cosmos	4	1	2	1	5	4	+1	**5**
4	Detroit City FC	4	1	2	1	3	2	+1	**5**
5	New Amsterdam FC	4	0	0	4	1	12	−11	**0**

Source: NISAofficial.com

==== Results summary ====
Overall								Home						Away					
Pld	W	D	L	GF	GA	GD	Pts	W	D	L	GF	GA	GD	W	D	L	GF	GA	GD
4	1	2	1	3	2	+1	5	1	0	1	3	2	+1	0	2	0	0	0	0

Last updated: September 9, 2020.
Source: Match reports

==== Matches ====
August 15, 2020 Week 1	**Detroit City**	**0–2**	**Chattanooga FC**	Hamtramck, Michigan
19:30 EST	Capozucchi (yellow card) 58'; Conteh (yellow card) 64'; Venegas (yellow card) 90+2'	DCFC Report; NISA Report; Broadcast	Lom 4'; Ferraz 56'	Stadium: Keyworth Stadium; Attendance: 0 Referee: Nicole Green
Note: Game was played behind closed doors due to the COVID-19 pandemic

August 22, 2020 Week 2	**Michigan Stars**	**0–0**	**Detroit City**	Pontiac, Michigan
19:00 EST	Satrústegui (yellow card) 44'	DCFC Report; NISA Report; Broadcast	Jirira (yellow card) 27'; Kafari (red card) 57'	Stadium: Ultimate Soccer Arena; Attendance: 0
Note: Game was played behind closed doors due to the COVID-19 pandemic

August 29, 2020 Week 3	**New York Cosmos**	**P–P**	**Detroit City**	Uniondale, New York
19:00 EST				Stadium: Mitchel Athletic Complex
Note: Match was postponed to protest racial injustice after the Shooting of Jacob Blake.

September 5, 2020 Week 4	**Detroit City**	**3–0**	**New Amsterdam FC**	Hamtramck, Michigan
19:30 EST	Rutz 7', 53'; Lawson 11'; Venegas (yellow card) 29'; Rice (red card) 72'	DCFC Report; NISA Report; Broadcast	Keita (yellow card) 22' (yellow-red card) 41'; Bedoya (yellow card) 59'; O. Williams (red card) 82'	Stadium: Keyworth Stadium; Attendance: 0
Note: Game was played behind closed doors due to the COVID-19 pandemic

September 9, 2020 Week 3 (Replay)	**New York Cosmos**	**0–0**	**Detroit City**	Uniondale, New York
19:00 EST	Cella (yellow card) 21'; Szetela (yellow card) 30'; Bardic (yellow card) 52'; Agolli (yellow card) 68'	NISA Report; FotMob Report; Broadcast	Matthews (yellow card) 15'; Conteh (yellow card) 35'	Stadium: Mitchel Athletic Complex; Attendance: 0 Referee: Christian Centeno
Note: Match was postponed to protest racial injustice after the Shooting of Jacob Blake. Game was played behind closed doors due to the COVID-19 pandemic.

=== Fall Playoffs ===
Detroit City FC hosted the entirety of the 2020-21 NISA Fall Playoffs at Keyworth Stadium.

==== Group stage ====
Pos	Team	Pld	W	D	L	GF	GA	GD	Pts	Qualification
1	Oakland Roots SC	3	2	0	1	5	2	+3	**6**	Advance to semifinals
2	Detroit City FC	3	2	0	1	6	5	+1	**6**	Advance to semifinals
3	Michigan Stars FC	3	1	1	1	4	3	+1	**4**	
4	New Amsterdam FC	3	0	1	2	4	9	−5	**1**	

Source: NISAofficial.com
Rules for classification: 1) Points, 2) Goal differential, 3) Goals scored, 4) Head-to-head record, 5) Coin toss

September 21, 2020 Group A Round 1	**Michigan Stars**	**2–0**	**Detroit City**	Hamtramck, Michigan
17:00 EST	Ben-Tal 52'; Bernedo 58'; Vang (yellow card) 82'	NISA Report; FotMob Report; Broadcast	Clegg (yellow card) 44'	Stadium: Keyworth Stadium; Attendance: 0 Referee: Nicole Green
Note: Game was played behind closed doors due to the COVID-19 pandemic

September 24, 2020 Group A Round 2	**Oakland Roots**	**1–2**	**Detroit City**	Hamtramck, Michigan
17:00 EST	Mbumba (yellow card) 39'; Fondy 45'	NISA Report; FotMob Report; Broadcast	Kafari (yellow card) 36'; Matthews 54'; Filerman (yellow card) 64'; Lawson 80'	Stadium: Keyworth Stadium; Attendance: 0 Referee: Jacob Little
Note: Game was played behind closed doors due to the COVID-19 pandemic

September 27, 2020 Group A Round 3	**Detroit City**	**4–2**	**New Amsterdam FC**	Hamtramck, Michigan
20:00 EST	Venegas 9'; Kafari 13'; Lawson 70', 76'	NISA Report; Broadcast	Bello 73', 84'; Nadaner (yellow card) 91'	Stadium: Keyworth Stadium; Attendance: 0 Referee: Joshua Abts
Note: Game was played behind closed doors due to the COVID-19 pandemic

==== Knock-Out Stage ====
Semifinals; September 30, 2020
**A1**	**Oakland Roots SC**	**3**
B2	Chattanooga FC	2
B1	Los Angeles Force	0
**A2**	**Detroit City FC**	**1**

Finals; October 2, 2020
A1	Oakland Roots SC	1
**A2**	**Detroit City FC**	**2**

Bold = winner
* = after extra time, ( ) = penalty shootout score
Source: nisaofficial.com

September 30, 2020 Semifinals	**Los Angeles Force**	**0–1**	**Detroit City**	Hamtramck, Michigan
20:00 EST		NISA Report; FotMob Report; Broadcast	Matthews (penalty missed) 7'; Todd (yellow card) 22', (goal) 29'	Stadium: Keyworth Stadium; Attendance: 0 Referee: Carter Brochu
Note: Game was played behind closed doors due to the COVID-19 pandemic

October 2, 2020 NISA Fall Championship	**Oakland Roots**	**1–2**	**Detroit City**	Hamtramck, Michigan
18:00 EST	Rodriguez 26'; Harish (yellow card) 54'; Navarro (yellow card) 77'; Wier (yellow card) 80'; Irwin (yellow card) 90'	NISA Report; FotMob Report; Broadcast	Saydee (yellow card) 16'; Lawson 65'; Peterson 85'	Stadium: Keyworth Stadium; Attendance: 0 Referee: Nicole Green
Note: Game was played behind closed doors due to the COVID-19 pandemic

=== NISA Legends Cup ===
The Spring season began on April 13, 2021, with a bubble tournament named Legends Cup and hosted by Chattanooga FC, with the winner gaining entry into the Spring 2021 Final. Phase 2, which is scheduled to begin on May 1, 2021, will be a traditional regular season hosted in each team's markets, the winner of which will face the winner of Phase 1 in the Spring 2021 Final, to determine the Spring champion.

Detroit City was assigned to the second group of three. The best team at the end of the group stage qualifies directly to the Legends Cup final, while the second and third seeds will play a semifinal game to determine the second finalist.

==== Group 2 ====
Home \ Away	CAL	DET	STU
California United Strikers FC	—	0–0	1–1
Detroit City FC		—	2–0
Stumptown AC			—

Source: nisasoccer.com
Legend: Blue = home team win; Yellow = draw; Red = away team win.

April 13, 2021 Group 2 Round 1	**Detroit City**	**0–0**	**Cal United**	Chattanooga, Tennessee
17:00 EDT	Bosh Tanyi (yellow card) 56'	Report	North (yellow card) 50'	Stadium: Finley Stadium

April 16, 2021 Group 2 Round 2	**Detroit City**	**2–0**	**Stumptown AC**	Chattanooga, Tennessee
12:00 EDT	Matthews 57'; Venegas (yellow card) 82'; Botello Faz 87'	Report		Stadium: Finley Stadium

April 22, 2021 Semi-Finals	**Detroit City**	**1–0**	**SD 1904**	Chattanooga, Tennessee
20:00 EDT	Todd (yellow card) 33'; Carroll 43'; Rodriguez (yellow card) 90'	Report	Barrios (yellow card) 84'	Stadium: Finley Stadium

April 25, 2021 Final	**Chattanooga FC**	**0–3**	**Detroit City**	Chattanooga, Tennessee
20:00 EDT	McGrath (yellow card) 50'	Report	Lewis 11'; Todd 34'; Venegas 90+4'	Stadium: Finley Stadium

==== Legends Cup Standings ====
Pos	Team	Pld	W	D	L	GF	GA	GD	Pts	Qualification
1	Chattanooga FC	2	2	0	0	7	1	+6	6	Advance to Legends Cup final
2	Detroit City FC	2	1	1	0	2	0	+2	4	Advance to Legends Cup semifinal
3	San Diego 1904 FC	2	1	1	0	3	2	+1	4	Advance to Legends Cup semifinal
4	Los Angeles Force	2	1	0	1	4	6	−2	3	
5	Michigan Stars FC	2	0	2	0	2	2	0	2	
6	California United Strikers FC	2	0	2	0	1	1	0	2	
7	Maryland Bobcats FC	2	0	1	1	2	3	−1	1	
8	Stumptown AC	2	0	1	1	1	3	−2	1	
9	New Amsterdam FC	2	0	0	2	2	6	−4	0	

Source: nisasoccer.com
Rules for classification: 1) points; 2) goal differential; 3) goals scored; 4) head to head; 5) goals allowed; 6) coin toss

Semifinals; April 22, 2021			Finals; April 25, 2021
			1	Chattanooga FC	0
2	**Detroit City FC**	**1**	2	**Detroit City FC**	**3**
3	San Diego 1904 FC	0

Bold = winner
* = after extra time, ( ) = penalty shootout score

=== 2021 NISA Spring Season ===
Pos	Team	Pld	W	D	L	GF	GA	GD	Pts	Qualification
1	Detroit City FC (Y, X)	8	6	2	0	14	3	+11	20	Advance to season final
2	Los Angeles Force	8	6	0	2	11	6	+5	18	Advance to spring final (Note: If either 2020 Fall Champion Detroit or 2021 Legends Cup runner-up Chattanooga finish the spring season in first place, or both teams finish in the top two, the spot in the spring final will go to the next best team.)
3	Stumptown AC	8	4	3	1	8	4	+4	15	
4	California United Strikers FC	8	4	1	3	12	10	+2	13	
5	Maryland Bobcats FC	8	3	2	3	9	8	+1	11	
6	Chattanooga FC (Z)	8	2	2	4	6	8	−2	8	Advance to spring final
7	San Diego 1904 FC	8	2	1	5	8	17	−9	7	
8	Michigan Stars FC	8	1	2	5	5	12	−7	5	
9	New Amsterdam FC	8	1	1	6	5	10	−5	4	

Source: nisasoccer.com
Rules for classification: 1) points; 2) goal differential; 3) goals scored; 4) head to head; 5) goals allowed; 6) coin toss
(X) Spring Legends Cup champion; (Y) Fall Champion, qualifies for season final; (Z) Spring Legends Cup runner-up, qualifies for spring final
Notes:

May 1, 2021 Week 1	**Detroit City**	**1–0**	**Maryland Bobcats**	Hamtramck, Michigan
19:30 EDT	Manning 90+'	Report; Twitter	Brown (yellow card) 26'; Dawkins (yellow card) 59'	Stadium: Keyworth Stadium; Attendance: 1,530; Referee: Brandon Gardner

May 7, 2021 Week 2	**New Amsterdam FC**	**0–1**	**Detroit City**	Warwick, New York
19:00 EDT	Vicente (yellow card) 49'	Report	Todd 15'; Filerman (yellow card) 20'	Stadium: Hudson Sports Complex; Referee: Ernie Constantine

May 12, 2021 Week 3	**Cal United**	**0–3**	**Detroit City**	Irvine, California
19:00 PDT	Bowers (yellow card) 10'; Bryant (yellow card) 81'	Report	Faz 17'; Rutz 44'; Rodriguez 67'	Stadium: Championship Stadium; Referee: Omeed Azadpour

May 15, 2021 Week 4	**1904 FC**	**1–3**	**Detroit City**	Chula Vista, California
17:00 PDT	Ramos (yellow card) 31'; Kleszewski (yellow card) 35'; Romero (yellow card) 68', (goal) 86' (pen.)	Report	Manning 45'; Rutz 50'; Todd (yellow card) 53'; Filerman 84'	Stadium: Chula Vista Elite Athlete Training Center; Referee: William Randy Hoffman

May 22, 2021 Week 5	**Michigan Stars**	**1–1**	**Detroit City**	Washington, Michigan
19:00 EDT	Reynolds (yellow card) 38'; Nuel 87' (pen.)	Report	Saydee 50'	Stadium: Michigan Stars Sports Center; Referee: Ernie Constantine

June 2, 2021 Week 6	**Detroit City**	**3–0**	**LA Force**	Hamtramck, Michigan
19:30 EDT	Faz 46', 71' (pen.); Filerman (yellow card) 65'; Todd 76'	Report	Ocegueda (yellow card) 20'; Moreno (yellow card) 44'	Stadium: Keyworth Stadium; Attendance: 3,356; Referee: Matt Geringer

June 5, 2021 Week 7	**Detroit City**	**0–0**	**Stumptown AC**	Hamtramck, Michigan
19:30 EDT	Manning (yellow card) 8'	Report	Hines (yellow card) 41'; Ward (yellow card) 50'; Martinez (yellow card) 72'; Kurtz (yellow card) 86'	Stadium: Keyworth Stadium

June 26, 2021 Week 8	**Detroit City**	**2–1**	**Chattanooga FC**	Hamtramck, Michigan
19:30 EDT	Faz 2'; Filerman 19'; Espinal (yellow card) 72'; Rodriguez (yellow card) 74'	Report	Coleman (yellow card) 15'; Oliveira 78'	Stadium: Keyworth Stadium; Attendance: 4,741; Referee: Lorenzo Hernandez

=== 2020-21 Season Playoffs ===
Detroit City FC, the winner of the Fall season, hosted semifinal winner Los Angeles Force in the inaugural NISA Championship match on July 3, 2021.

July 3, 2021 NISA 2020–21 Season Final	**Detroit City**	**1–0**	**LA Force**	Hamtramck, Michigan
19:30 EDT	McLaughlin 62' (o.g.); Botello Faz (yellow card) 73'	Report; Broadcast	Gordillo (yellow card) 30'; Moran (Ast. Coach) (yellow card) 69' (yellow-red card) 90+6'; Villatoro (yellow card) 70'; Pérez (yellow card) 74'; Barrera (yellow card) 79'; Goñi (yellow card) 84'; Chaney (yellow card) 90+2'	Stadium: Keyworth Stadium; Attendance: 7,231; Referee: Gustavo Solorio
Note: Moran cards not shown on report but seen on stream including post-match, Goñi sub and yellow card not reported but seen on broadcast, report lists Villatoro twice on Force starting XI instead of Villon

== Squad statistics ==
As of Match played June 26, 2021

=== Appearances and goals ===
No.	Pos	Nat	Player	Total		Fall Season		Fall Playoffs		Legends Cup		Spring Season	
No.	Pos	Nat	Player	Apps	Goals	Apps	Goals	Apps	Goals	Apps	Goals	Apps	Goals
Goalkeepers
1	GK	(United States) USA	Nathan Steinwascher	15	0	3+0	0	0+0	0	4+0	0	8+0	0
13	GK	(United States) USA	Armando Quezada	0	0	-	-	-	-	0+0	0	0+0	0
Defenders
2	DF	(United States) USA	James Filerman	15	2	4+0	0	4+0	0	0+0	0	7+0	2
3	DF	(United States) USA	Javan Torre	3	0	-	-	-	-	1+0	0	0+2	0
4	DF	(United States) USA	Anthony Manning	11	2	-	-	-	-	3+0	0	8+0	2
5	DF	(Republic of Ireland) IRL	Stephen Carroll	21	1	4+0	0	5+0	0	4+0	1	8+0	0
12	DF	(Zimbabwe) ZIM	Tendai Jirira	9	0	4+0	0	5+0	0	0+0	0	0+0	0
15	DF	(United States) USA	Matt Lewis	12	1	-	-	-	-	4+0	1	8+0	0
22	DF	(United States) USA	Kevin Venegas	19	2	2+1	0	5+0	1	4+0	1	7+0	0
Midfielders
7	MF	(United States) USA	Roddy Green	10	0	1+3	0	0+0	0	1+2	0	1+2	0
10	MF	(Liberia) LBR	Cyrus Saydee	16	1	0+0	0	4+1	0	3+0	0	6+2	1
14	MF	(United States) USA	Javier Steinwascher	9	0	-	-	-	-	1+2	0	0+6	0
21	MF	(United States) USA	Maxi Rodriguez	12	1	-	-	-	-	4+0	0	8+0	1
47	MF	(Hungary) HUN	Barnabas Tanyi	1	0	-	-	-	-	0+1	0	0+0	0
99	MF	(Bulgaria) BUL	George Chomakov	13	0	2+1	0	1+2	0	1+2	0	4+0	0
Forwards
6	FW	(Scotland) SCO	Max Todd	17	4	0+0	0	5+0	1	3+1	1	5+3	2
11	FW	(United States) USA	Connor Rutz	20	4	4+0	2	2+2	0	4+0	0	8+0	2
17	FW	(Hungary) HUN	Benedek Tanyi	5	0	0+2	0	0+0	0	0+3	0	0+0	0
19	FW	(Mexico) MEX	Pato Botello Faz	11	5	-	-	-	-	2+1	1	7+1	4
20	FW	(South Africa) RSA	Yazeed Matthews	16	2	3+0	0	5+0	1	3+1	1	2+2	0
23	FW	(Honduras) HON	Darwin Espinal	1	0	-	-	-	-	-	-	1+2	0
Left during season
	GK	(Haiti) HAI	Jean Antoine	5	0	1+0	0	4+0	0	-	-	-	-
	FW	(Mexico) MEX	Javier Bautista	1	0	0+1	0	0+0	0	-	-	-	-
	FW	(United States) USA	Travis Bowen	0	0	0+0	0	0+0	0	-	-	-	-
	DF	(Chile) CHI	Sebastian Capozucchi	6	0	2+0	0	1+3	0	-	-	-	-
	DF	(United States) USA	Brandon Clegg	2	0	0+0	0	1+1	0	-	-	-	-
	MF	(Sierra Leone) SLE	Ibrahim Conteh	7	0	3+1	0	3+0	0	-	-	-	-
	DF	(Ghana) GHA	Evans Frimpong	7	0	3+1	0	0+3	0	-	-	-	-
	MF	(United States) USA	Bakie Goodman	5	0	0+0	0	5+0	0	-	-	-	-
	MF	(Ghana) GHA	Michael Kafari	9	1	4+0	0	4+1	1	-	-	-	-
	FW	(Jamaica) JAM	Shawn Lawson	9	5	4+0	1	0+5	4	-	-	-	-
	FW	(United States) USA	Ryan Peterson	7	1	0+3	0	0+4	1	-	-	-	-
	FW	(United States) USA	Elijah Rice	1	0	0+1	0	0+0	0	-	-	-	-
	GK	(United States) USA	Parker Siegfried	2	0	0+1	0	1+0	0	-	-	-	-
	MF	(United States) USA	Pablo Cruz	1	0	-	-	-	-	0+1	0	-	-

=== Goal scorers ===
Place	Name	Fall Season	Fall Playoffs	Legends Cup	Spring Season	League Play	All Competitions
1	Shawn Lawson	1	4	-	-	1	5
1	Pato Botello Faz	-	-	1	4	4	5
3	Connor Rutz	2	0	0	2	4	4
3	Max Todd	0	1	1	2	2	4
5	Yazeed Matthews	0	1	1	0	0	2
5	Kevin Venegas	0	1	1	0	0	2
5	Anthony Manning	-	-	0	2	2	2
5	James Filerman	0	0	-	2	2	2
8	Michael Kafari	0	1	-	-	0	1
8	Ryan Peterson	0	1	-	-	0	1
8	Stephen Carroll	0	0	1	0	0	1
8	Matt Lewis	-	-	1	0	0	1
8	Maxi Rodriguez	-	-	0	1	1	1
8	Cyrus Saydee	0	0	0	1	1	1

=== Disciplinary record ===
Name	Fall Season		Fall Playoffs		Legends Cup		Spring Season		Total	
Name	Yellow card	Red card	Yellow card	Red card	Yellow card	Red card	Yellow card	Red card	Yellow card	Red card
James Filerman	0	0	1	0	-	-	2	0	3	0
Cyrus Saydee	0	0	1	0	0	0	0	0	1	0
Tendai Jirira	1	0	0	0	0	0	0	0	1	0
Michael Kafari	0	1	1	0	-	-	-	-	1	1
Elijah Rice	0	1	0	0	-	-	-	-	0	1
Ibrahim Conteh	2	0	0	0	-	-	-	-	2	0
Yazeed Matthews	1	0	0	0	0	0	0	0	1	0
Kevin Venegas	2	0	0	0	1	0	0	0	3	0
Sebastian Capozucchi	1	0	0	0	-	-	-	-	1	0
Brandon Clegg	0	0	1	0	-	-	-	-	1	0
Barnabas Tanyi	-	-	-	-	1	0	0	0	1	0
Max Todd	0	0	0	0	1	0	1	0	2	0
Maxi Rodriguez	-	-	-	-	1	0	1	0	2	0
Anthony Manning	-	-	-	-	0	0	1	0	1	0
Darwin Espinal	-	-	-	-	0	0	1	0	1	0
