= 2019–20 Detroit City FC season =

American soccer team season

Detroit City FC
2019–20 season
- CEO: Sean Mann
- Manager: Trevor James
- Stadium: Keyworth Stadium
- NISA: Fall: N/A; Spring: 3rd
- Playoffs: Fall: N/A; Spring: N/A
- U.S. Open Cup: Cancelled
- Top goalscorer: League: 1 goal each: Matt Lewis; Roddy Green^{[a]} All: 1 goal each: Matt Lewis; Roddy Green^{[b]}
- Biggest win: 0–2 (against LA Force)
Home colors	Away colors	Alternate colors

The 2019–20 season was Detroit City FC's first professional season since the club was established in 2012 and their first in the National Independent Soccer Association.

Detroit City FC was accepted in the National Independent Soccer Association on December 11, 2019, and began competing in the 2020 Spring season. After playing a single match, the NISA season was postponed and then ultimately canceled on April 27, 2020, due to the COVID-19 pandemic.

== Roster ==
As of March 25, 2020.

No.	Pos.	Nat.	Name	Date of birth (age)	Since
1	GK	(United States)	Nathan Steinwascher	February 15, 1993 (age 33)	2016
5	DF	(Republic of Ireland)	Stephen Carroll (captain)	November 30, 1993 (age 32)	2017
7	MF	(United States)	Roddy Green	September 26, 1997 (age 29)	2017
8	MF	(United States)	Bakie Goodman	February 28, 1995 (age 31)	2019
9	FW	(Jamaica)	Shawn Lawson	January 13, 1994 (age 32)	2017
10	MF	(Liberia)	Cyrus Saydee	March 21, 1992 (age 34)	2012
11	DF	(United States)	Connor Rutz	April 9, 1997 (age 29)	2020
12	DF	(Zimbabwe)	Tendai Jirira	November 12, 1991 (age 35)	2019
14	MF	(Ghana)	Michael Kafari	October 30, 1991 (age 35)	2020
17	MF	(England)	James Vaughan	December 11, 1994 (age 31)	2019
20	FW	(South Africa)	Yazeed Matthews	April 22, 1996 (age 30)	2019
22	DF	(United States)	Kevin Venegas	April 29, 1989 (age 37)	2020
23	DF	(Chile)	Sebastian Capozucchi	December 23, 1995 (age 30)	2020
30	DF	(Ghana)	Evans Frimpong	August 8, 1989 (age 37)	2019
31	GK	(United States)	Austin Rogers	August 10, 1995 (age 31)	2020
57	FW	(Mexico)	Javier Bautista	March 22, 1993 (age 33)	2015
99	MF	(Bulgaria)	George Chomakov	November 19, 1990 (age 35)	2014

== Coaching staff ==
Name	Position
(England) Trevor James	Head coach and general manager
(United States) Brie Gauna	Head athletic trainer
(Brazil) Armen Tonianse	Assistant and goalkeeper coach

== Transfers ==
=== Transfers In ===
Date from	Position	Player	Last team	Type	Ref.
February 14, 2020	DF	(United States) Kevin Venegas	New York Cosmos	Free transfer	
February 20, 2020	MF	(United States) Salvatore Barone	New York Cosmos	Loan for Spring Season	
February 20, 2020	DF	(United States) Matt Lewis	New York Cosmos	Loan for Spring Season	
February 26, 2020	DF	(Chile) Sebastian Capozucchi	Milwaukee Torrent	Free transfer	
February 26, 2020	MF	(Ghana) Michael Kafari	New York Cosmos	Free transfer	
February 27, 2020	DF	(United States) Connor Rutz	Cincinnati Dutch Lions	Free transfer	
February 27, 2020	GK	(United States) Austin Rogers	(Albania) KF Tërbuni	Free transfer	
February 28, 2020	FW	(Mexico) Isaac Acuña	New York Cosmos	Loan for Spring Season	
March 11, 2020	FW	(Honduras) Darwin Espinal	New York Cosmos	Loan for Spring Season	

=== Transfers Out ===
Date to	Position	Player	Next team	Type	Ref.
March 24, 2020	DF	(United States) Matt Lewis	New York Cosmos	Loan terminated	
March 24, 2020	MF	(United States) Salvatore Barone	New York Cosmos	Loan terminated	
March 24, 2020	FW	(Honduras) Darwin Espinal	New York Cosmos	Loan terminated	
March 24, 2020	FW	(Mexico) Isaac Acuña	New York Cosmos	Loan terminated	

== Competitions ==
=== Friendlies ===
July 10, 2019 Friendly	Detroit City	1–3	(Mexico) FC Juárez	Hamtramck, Michigan
7:30 pm EST	Lawson 17'	Team Report; Detroit News Report	Borelli 36'; Xavier 39'; Hachen 65'	Stadium: Keyworth Stadium; Attendance: 6,901

August 13, 2019 Friendly	Detroit City	0–1	Indy Eleven	Hamtramck, Michigan
7:30 pm EST		Report	Starikov 71'	Stadium: Keyworth Stadium; Attendance: 4,350

August 31, 2019 Friendly	Detroit City	1–0	Philadelphia Fury	Hamtramck, Michigan
7:30 pm EST	Peterson 63' (pen.)	Report		Stadium: Keyworth Stadium; Attendance: 5,859

September 7, 2019 Friendly	Detroit City	2–1	(Mexico) Atlas F.C.	Hamtramck, Michigan
7:30 pm EST	Peterson 3'; Matthews 58'	Report	Barcelo 18'	Stadium: Keyworth Stadium; Attendance: 7,478

February 14, 2020 Pre-Season	Indy Eleven	2–1	Detroit City	Westfield, Indiana
	Ilić 12' (pen.); Antley 53'		Matthews 77'	Stadium: Grand Park
Note: Closed to public

=== NISA Fall season ===
Detroit City did not take part in the 2019 NISA Fall season in an official capacity. On August 15, the NISA Board of Governors announced Detroit, along with Chattanooga FC and Oakland Roots SC, had been accepted into the league but would not begin full league play until Spring 2020. The team did play a friendly match against then NISA member Philadelphia Fury on Saturday, August 31 at home. City also hosted a friendly against Liga MX side Atlas F.C. in September and earned the upset win, 2–1, in-front of a sold-out crowd.

=== NISA Spring season ===
Details for the 2020 NISA Spring showcase were announced January 27, 2020. On February 4, 2020, Detroit City FC announced a TV deal with local WMYD TV20 Detroit and the spring season home kickoff times.

==== Standings ====
Pos	Team	Pld	W	D	L	GF	GA	GD	Pts	Qualification
1	Oakland Roots SC	2	1	1	0	3	2	+1	4	Playoffs
2	California United Strikers FC (Q)	2	1	1	0	1	0	+1	4	Playoffs
3	Detroit City FC	1	1	0	0	2	0	+2	3	Playoffs
4	Stumptown Athletic	2	0	2	0	3	3	0	2	Playoffs
5	San Diego 1904 FC	2	0	2	0	2	2	0	2	
6	Chattanooga FC	1	0	1	0	1	1	0	1	
7	Los Angeles Force	2	0	1	1	1	3	−2	1	
8	Michigan Stars FC	2	0	0	2	1	3	−2	0	

Updated to match(es) played on March 8, 2020. Source: NISAofficial.com
(Q) Qualified for the phase indicated

==== Results summary ====
Overall								Home						Away					
Pld	W	D	L	GF	GA	GD	Pts	W	D	L	GF	GA	GD	W	D	L	GF	GA	GD
1	1	0	0	2	0	+2	3	0	0	0	0	0	0	1	0	0	2	0	+2

Last updated: February 28, 2020.
Source: Match reports

==== Matches ====
February 28, 2020 Week 1	LA Force	0–2	Detroit City	Los Angeles, California
22:00 EST	Gonzalez (yellow card) 70'	Team Report; Detroit News Report; MyCujoo Broadcast	Lewis 22'; Carroll (yellow card) 64'; Kafari (yellow card) 90+2'; Green 90+3'	Stadium: Jesse Owens Stadium; Attendance: 1,132

March 21, 2020 Week 2	Detroit City	C–C	Oakland Roots	Hamtramck, Michigan
15:00 EDT				Stadium: Keyworth Stadium
Note: On March 12, NISA announced that it would be suspending its season 30 days due to the COVID-19 pandemic

March 28, 2020 Week 3	Detroit City	C–C	Michigan Stars	Hamtramck, Michigan
15:00 EDT				Stadium: Keyworth Stadium
Note: On March 12, NISA announced that it would be suspending its season 30 days due to the COVID-19 pandemic

April 4, 2020 Week 4	Oakland Roots	C–C	Detroit City	Oakland, California
20:10 EDT				Stadium: Laney College
Note: On March 12, NISA announced that it would be suspending its season 30 days due to the COVID-19 pandemic

April 11, 2020 Week 5	Detroit City	C–C	Chattanooga FC	Hamtramck, Michigan
15:00 EDT				Stadium: Keyworth Stadium
Note: On March 20, NISA announced that it would be extending its suspension of its season to May 10 due to the COVID-19 pandemic

April 19, 2020 Week 6	Cal United	C–C	Detroit City	Irvine, California
19:00 EDT				Stadium: Championship Stadium
Note: On March 20, NISA announced that it would be extending its suspension of its season to May 10 due to the COVID-19 pandemic

April 25, 2020 Week 7	Detroit City	C–C	1904 FC	Hamtramck, Michigan
15:00 EDT				Stadium: Keyworth Stadium
Note: On March 20, NISA announced that it would be extending its suspension of its season to May 10 due to the COVID-19 pandemic

May 2, 2020 Week 8	Chattanooga FC	C–C	Detroit City	Chattanooga, Tennessee
19:30 EDT				Stadium: Finley Stadium
Note: On March 20, NISA announced that it would be extending its suspension of its season to May 10 due to the COVID-19 pandemic

May 9, 2020 Week 9	1904 FC	C–C	Detroit City	San Diego, California
22:04 EDT				Stadium: Lincoln High School
Note: On March 20, NISA announced that it would be extending its suspension of its season to May 10 due to the COVID-19 pandemic

May 16, 2020 Week 10	Detroit City	C–C	LA Force	Hamtramck, Michigan
19:30 EDT				Stadium: Keyworth Stadium
Note: On April 27, NISA and the club announced that the spring season would be canceled due to the COVID-19 pandemic

May 23, 2020 Week 11	Michigan Stars	C–C	Detroit City	Pontiac, Michigan
19:00 EDT				Stadium: Ultimate Soccer Arena
Note: On April 27, NISA and the club announced that the spring season would be canceled due to the COVID-19 pandemic

May 30, 2020 Week 12	Detroit City	C–C	Cal United	Hamtramck, Michigan
19:30 EDT				Stadium: Keyworth Stadium
Note: On April 27, NISA and the club announced that the spring season would be canceled due to the COVID-19 pandemic

June 6, 2020 Week 13	Stumptown Athletic	C–C	Detroit City	Matthews, North Carolina
19:04 EDT				Stadium: CSA OrthoCarolina Sportsplex
Note: On April 27, NISA and the club announced that the spring season would be canceled due to the COVID-19 pandemic

June 13, 2020 Week 14	Detroit City	C–C	Stumptown Athletic	Hamtramck, Michigan
19:30 EDT				Stadium: Keyworth Stadium
Note: On April 27, NISA and the club announced that the spring season would be canceled due to the COVID-19 pandemic

Round	1	2	3	4	5	6	7	8	9	10	11	12	13	14
Stadium	A	H	H	A	H	A	H	A	A	H	A	H	A	H
Result	W													
Position	1													

Source: https://www.nisaofficial.com/schedule
A = Away; H = Home; W = Win; D = Draw; L = Loss

=== U.S. Open Cup ===
Detroit was set to enter the 2020 U.S. Open Cup with the rest of the National Independent Soccer Association teams in the Second Round. It was announced on January 29 that their first opponent would be USL Championship side El Paso Locomotive FC. The competition was suspended on March 13 due to the COVID-19 pandemic, and officially cancelled on August 17.

April 8, 2020 Second Round	Detroit City (Michigan)	C–C	(Texas) El Paso Locomotive	Hamtramck, Michigan
19:00 EDT				Stadium: Keyworth Stadium
Note: On March 13, U.S. Soccer’s Open Cup Committee announced the tournament would be temporarily suspended due to the COVID-19 pandemic

== Squad statistics ==
As of Match played February 28, 2020

=== Appearances and goals ===
No.	Pos	Nat	Player	Total		Spring Season		U.S. Open Cup	
No.	Pos	Nat	Player	Apps	Goals	Apps	Goals	Apps	Goals
Goalkeepers
1	GK	(United States) USA	Nathan Steinwascher	0	0	0	0	-	-
31	GK	(United States) USA	Austin Rogers	1	0	1	0	-	-
Defenders
3	DF	(United States) USA	Matt Lewis	1	1	1	1	-	-
5	DF	(Republic of Ireland) IRL	Stephen Carroll	1	0	1	0	-	-
11	DF	(United States) USA	Connor Rutz	1	0	1	0	-	-
12	DF	(Zimbabwe) ZIM	Tendai Jirira	1	0	1	0	-	-
22	DF	(United States) USA	Kevin Venegas	1	0	1	0	-	-
23	DF	(Chile) CHI	Sebastian Capozucchi	0	0	0	0	-	-
30	DF	(Ghana) GHA	Evans Frimpong	1	0	1	0	-	-
Midfielders
7	MF	(United States) USA	Roddy Green	1	1	1	1	-	-
8	MF	(United States) USA	Bakie Goodman	1	0	1	0	-	-
10	MF	(Liberia) LBR	Cyrus Saydee	1	0	1	0	-	-
14	MF	(Ghana) GHA	Michael Kafari	1	0	1	0	-	-
17	MF	(England) ENG	James Vaughan	0	0	0	0	-	-
21	MF	(United States) USA	Salvatore Barone	0	0	0	0	-	-
99	MF	(Bulgaria) BUL	George Chomakov	1	0	1	0	-	-
Forwards
9	FW	(Jamaica) JAM	Shawn Lawson	0	0	0	0	-	-
20	FW	(South Africa) RSA	Yazeed Matthews	0	0	0	0	-	-
24	FW	(Honduras) HON	Darwin Espinal	0	0	0	0	-	-
70	FW	(Mexico) MEX	Isaac Acuña	0	0	0	0	-	-
57	FW	(Mexico) MEX	Javier Bautista	0	0	0	0	-	-

=== Goal scorers ===
Place	Position	Nation	Number	Name	Spring Season	U.S. Open Cup	Total
1	DF	(United States)	3	Matt Lewis	1	-	1
1	MF	(United States)	7	Roddy Green	1	-	1

=== Disciplinary record ===
Number	Nation	Position	Name	Spring Season		U.S. Open Cup		Total	
Number	Nation	Position	Name	Yellow card	Red card	Yellow card	Red card	Yellow card	Red card
5	(United States)	DF	Stephen Carroll	1	0	-	-	1	0
14	(Ghana)	MF	Michael Kafari	1	0	-	-	1	0

== See also ==
- 2019–20 NISA season

== Notes ==
1.^a Only includes matches played during the 2020 spring leg of the 2019–20 NISA season.
2.^b Only includes competitive matches played after January 1, 2020.
