= List of Detroit City FC seasons =

Detroit City FC is an American soccer club that competes in the USL Championship, the second division of American soccer. Established in 2012 as an amateur club, the first eight years were spent in the semi-professional National Premier Soccer League, followed by a move to professional soccer with a two-year stint in the third tier National Independent Soccer Association. The following list covers each season of the club's existence, documenting its performance in all competitive competitions.

== Key ==
Key to competitions

- USL Championship (USLC) – The second division of soccer in the United States, established in 2010 and previously known as USL and USL Pro. The Championship was the third division of American soccer from its founding until its elevation to second division status in 2017.
- National Independent Soccer Association (NISA) – A third division American soccer league that began play in 2019.
- National Premier Soccer League (NPSL) - A semi-professional soccer league in the United States, competing at the top of the amateur league system.
- USL Cup - The interleague cup competition contested by the USL professional tiers, beginning in 2024 with USL League One only, and expanding the following year.
- U.S. Open Cup (USOC) – The premier knockout cup competition in US soccer, first contested in 1914.
- CONCACAF Champions Cup (CCC) – The premier competition in North American soccer since 1962.

Key to colors and symbols

1st or W	Winners
2nd or RU	Runners-up
Last	Wooden Spoon
♦	League Golden Boot

Key to league record

- Season = The year and article of the season
- Tier = Level on pyramid
- League = League name
- Conf/Div = Conference or division within the league
- Pld = Games played
- W = Games won
- D = Games drawn
- L = Games lost
- GF = Goals scored
- GA = Goals against
- Pts = Points
- Conf = Conference position
- Ovr = Overall league position

Key to cup record

- DNP = Did not participate
- DNQ = Did not qualify
- NH = Competition not held or canceled
- R1 = First round
- R2 = Second round
- R3 = Third round
- Ro32 = Round of 32
- Ro16 = Round of 16
- QF = Quarterfinals
- SF = Semifinals
- RU = Runners-up
- W = Winners

== Seasons ==
Season	Tier	League	Conf/Div	Record							Position		Playoffs	USOC	USL Cup	Avg. Attendance	Top goalscorer	
Season	Tier	League	Conf/Div	Pld	W	D	L	GF	GA	Pts	Conf	Ovr	Playoffs	USOC	USL Cup	Avg. Attendance	Name	Goals
2012	-	NPSL	Great Lakes	12	5	5	2	26	10	20	2nd	-	Conf. SF	Ineligible	N/A	1,244	(United States) Adam Bedell (United States) Kyle Bethel	4
2013	-	NPSL	Great Lakes	12	11	1	0	35	8	34	1st	-	Conf. RU	DNQ	N/A	1,591	(United States) Zach Myers	6
2014	-	NPSL	Great Lakes West	14	8	3	3	30	17	28	2nd	-	DNQ	R1	N/A	2,642	(England) Will Mellors-Blair	5
2015	-	NPSL	Midwest	12	8	2	2	30	14	26	2nd	-	Regional SF	R1	N/A	3,306	(England) Will Mellors-Blair	10
2016	-	NPSL	Great Lakes West	12	4	4	4	24	21	16	5th	-	DNQ	R2	N/A	5,255	(United States) Tommy Catalano (Liberia) Cyrus Saydee	4
2017	-	NPSL	Great Lakes	14	9	3	2	29	19	30	2nd	-	Nat'l SF	DNQ	N/A	5,498	(Jamaica) Shawn Lawson	7
2018	-	NPSL	Great Lakes	12	5	3	4	36	15	18	4th	-	DNQ	R2	N/A	5,946	(Jamaica) Shawn Lawson	6
2019	-	NPSL	Great Lakes	14	10	3	1	39	6	33	1st	-	Regional RU	DNQ	N/A	6,037	(Jamaica) Shawn Lawson	12
2019–20 Spring	3	NISA		1	1	0	0	2	0	3	-	3rd	NH	NH	N/A	5,647 (Note: Only includes Members Cup as no home games were played prior to the 2019–20 NISA season being canceled due to the COVID-19 pandemic)	(United States) Matt Lewis (United States) Roddy Green	1
2020–21 Fall	3	NISA	Eastern	4	1	2	1	3	2	5	4th	-	W	NH	N/A	0 (Note: Due to the COVID-19 pandemic, fans were not allowed to attend)	(United States) Connor Rutz (Mexico) Pato Botello Faz	4
2020–21 Spring	3	NISA		8	6	2	0	14	3	20	-	1st	Overall W (Note: Detroit City already had a berth to the season final and thus was not eligible to compete in the spring final)	NH	N/A	0	(United States) Connor Rutz (Mexico) Pato Botello Faz	4
2021	3	NISA		18	14	3	1	35	10	45	-	1st	W	NH	N/A	4,280	(United States) Maxi Rodriguez	7
2022	2	USLC	Eastern	34	14	12	8	44	30	54	7th	10th	R1	Ro32	N/A	6,118	(United States) Maxi Rodriguez	9
2023	2	USLC	Eastern	34	11	8	15	30	39	41	8th	18th	QF	R3	N/A	6,032	(England) Ben Morris	7
2024	2	USLC	Eastern	34	15	11	8	46	32	56	3rd	4th	R1	Ro16	DNP	6,312	(United States) Maxi Rodriguez	12
2025	2	USLC	Eastern	30	9	10	11	33	35	37	8th	15th	QF	Ro32	R1	6,229	(South Africa) Darren Smith	13
2026	2	USLC	Eastern	30	14	9	7	34	21	51	3rd	4th	R1	Ro32	R1	6,251	(South Africa) Darren Smith	16
