= Fall 2021 Detroit City FC season =

American soccer team season

Detroit City FC
Fall 2021 season
- CEO: Sean Mann
- Manager: Trevor James
- Stadium: Keyworth Stadium; Hamtramck, Michigan
- NISA: Champions (No playoffs)
- Top goalscorer: 7 goals: Maxi Rodriguez
- Highest home attendance: 6,076 (Aug 7 vs. CHI)
- Lowest home attendance: 3,689 (Sep 25 vs. LAF)
- Average home league attendance: 4,280
- Biggest win: DET 6–1 NAFC (Sep. 29)
- Biggest defeat: DET 0–1 STAC (Sep. 18)
Home colors	Away colors

The Fall 2021 Detroit City FC season was the club's third professional season since the club was established in 2012. It was also the team's third and final season in the National Independent Soccer Association.

== Kits ==
Home	Away	Charity for Give Merit

== Roster ==
As of August 7, 2021.

No.	Pos.	Nat.	Name	Date of birth (age)	Since
1	GK	(United States)	Nate Steinwascher	February 15, 1993 (age 33)	2016
2	DF	(United States)	James Filerman	November 11, 1996 (age 29)	2020
3	DF	(United States)	Javan Torre	October 20, 1993 (age 32)	2021
4	DF	(United States)	Anthony Manning	September 4, 1992 (age 34)	2021
5	DF	(Republic of Ireland)	Stephen Carroll (captain)	November 30, 1993 (age 32)	2017
7	MF	(United States)	Roddy Green	September 26, 1997 (age 28)	2017
10	MF	(Liberia)	Cyrus Saydee	March 21, 1992 (age 34)	2012
11	FW	(United States)	Connor Rutz	April 9, 1997 (age 29)	2020
12	DF	(Zimbabwe)	Tendai Jirira	November 12, 1991 (age 34)	2019
13	GK	(United States)	Armando Quezada	July 6, 1994 (age 32)	2019
14	MF	(United States)	Javier Steinwascher	March 14, 1998 (age 28)	2021
15	DF	(United States)	Matt Lewis	August 1, 1996 (age 30)	2020
17	MF	(England)	James Vaughan	December 11, 1994 (age 31)	2021
19	FW	(Mexico)	Pato Botello Faz	September 8, 1996 (age 30)	2021
20	FW	(South Africa)	Yazeed Matthews	April 22, 1996 (age 30)	2019
21	MF	(United States)	Maxi Rodriguez	August 9, 1995 (age 31)	2021
22	DF	(United States)	Kevin Venegas	April 29, 1989 (age 37)	2020
23	FW	(Honduras)	Darwin Espinal	January 16, 1995 (age 31)	2021
25	DF	(England)	Richard Bryan	September 13, 1995 (age 31)	2021
87	GK	(United States)	Eric Perilla	January 1, 1987 (age 39)	2021
99	MF	(Bulgaria)	George Chomakov	November 19, 1990 (age 35)	2014

== Coaching staff ==
Name	Position
(England) Trevor James	Head coach and general manager
(United States) Brie Gauna	Head athletic trainer
(Brazil) Armen Tonianse	Assistant and goalkeeper coach

== Transfers ==
=== In ===
Date from	Position	Player	Last team	Type	Ref.
July 2021	GK	(United States) Eric Perilla	Unattached	Free transfer	
August 21	DF	(England) Richard Bryan	Unattached	Free transfer	
August 23	MF	(England) James Vaughan	(England) Eastbourne Borough F.C.	Free transfer	

=== Out ===
Date to	Position	Player	Next team	Type	Ref.
July 2021	FW	(Scotland) Max Todd	Unattached	Not re-signed	
February 16, 2021	FW	(Hungary) Benedek Tanyi	Unattached	Departed club	
February 16, 2021	MF	(Hungary) Barnabas Tanyi	Unattached	Departed club	

=== Loan out ===
Date	Position	Player	Loaned to	Details	Ref.
July 23	DF	(United States) Matt Lewis	El Paso Locomotive FC	Until August 1	

== Competitions ==
=== Friendlies ===
July 7 Friendly	Detroit City FC	6–1	Hamtramck City FC (UPSL)	Hamtramck, Michigan
7:30 p.m. EDT	Faz 34'; Larson 45'; Filerman 52', 66'; Rutz 80'; Jirira 90+1'	Report; Broadcast	Kourouma 21' (pen.); (yellow card) 40'	Stadium: Keyworth Stadium
Note: Benefit match, donations made to the United Humanitarian Foundation to support efforts in Yemen

=== NISA Independent Cup ===
Details for the 2021 NISA Independent Cup were released on June 10. Detroit was placed in the Great Lakes Region for the second straight year along with Rust Belt Derby rivals FC Buffalo, Cleveland SC, and Midwest Premier League side Livonia City FC.

City won the regional title for a second straight season after beating Cleveland, 4–1, in its third match.

==== Standings ====
Pos	Team	Pld	W	D	L	GF	GA	GD	Pts
1	Detroit City FC (C)	3	3	0	0	17	2	+15	9
2	FC Buffalo	3	2	0	1	11	3	+8	6
3	Cleveland SC	3	0	1	2	3	13	−10	1
4	Livonia City FC	3	0	1	2	2	15	−13	1

Source: nisaofficial.com
Rules for classification: 1) points; 2) goal differential; 3) goals for; 4) head-to-head
(C) Champions

==== Matches ====
July 14 Match 1	Detroit City FC	3–1	FC Buffalo	Hamtramck, Michigan
7:30 p.m. EDT	Lewis 4'; Rutz 40'; Filerman 67'	Broadcast	Keita 55'	Stadium: Keyworth Stadium; Attendance: 3,271
Note: Part of the Rust Belt Derby

July 28 Match 2	Detroit City FC	10–0	Livonia City FC (MWPL)	Hamtramck, Michigan
7:30 p.m. EDT	Filerman 2'; Matthews 22', 68', 85'; Venegas 35'; Jirira 59'; Faz 62'; Espinal 71', 83'; Green 81'	Report; Broadcast		Stadium: Keyworth Stadium; Attendance: 4,757; Referee: Michael Koziara

August 3 Match 3	Cleveland SC	1–4	Detroit City FC	Berea, Ohio
7:30 p.m. EDT	Elbana (yellow card) 44'; Cvecko 76'	Broadcast	Matthews 3'; Anthony Manning 33'; Rutz 37'; Espinal 90'	Stadium: George Finnie Stadium
Note: Part of the Rust Belt Derby

=== National Independent Soccer Association season ===
Details regarding the Fall season were released on June 16.

==== Standings ====
Pos	Team	Pld	W	D	L	GF	GA	GD	Pts
1	Detroit City FC (C)	18	14	3	1	35	10	+25	45 (Note: The November 13 match between the LA Force and Detroit City FC was cancelled due to several players testing positive for COVID-19. The match was declared a 0-0 draw.)
2	California United Strikers FC	18	9	6	3	31	20	+11	33
3	Los Angeles Force	18	7	9	2	20	14	+6	30
4	New Amsterdam FC	18	7	2	9	29	29	0	23
5	Chattanooga FC	18	7	2	9	20	21	−1	23
6	Chicago House AC	18	7	2	9	18	26	−8	23
7	Michigan Stars FC	18	5	6	7	24	24	0	21
8	Stumptown AC	18	4	8	6	13	18	−5	20
9	Maryland Bobcats FC	18	5	5	8	20	28	−8	20
10	San Diego 1904 FC	18	2	3	13	17	37	−20	9

Source: nisasoccer.com
Rules for classification: 1) points; 2) goal differential; 3) goals scored; 4) head-to-head
(C) Champions

==== Results summary ====
Overall								Home						Away					
Pld	W	D	L	GF	GA	GD	Pts	W	D	L	GF	GA	GD	W	D	L	GF	GA	GD
18	14	3	1	35	10	+25	45	7	1	1	13	4	+9	7	2	0	22	6	+16

Last updated: November 20, 2021.
Source: Match reports

==== Matches ====
August 7 1	Detroit City FC	3–2	Chicago House AC	Hamtramck, Michigan
7:30 p.m. EDT	Lewis 30'; Rodriguez 39' (pen.); Carroll (yellow card) 78'; Manning 87'	Report; Broadcast	Wojcik 25'; Kim (yellow card) 37'; Conner 49' (pen.), (yellow card) 89'	Stadium: Keyworth Stadium; Attendance: 6,076; Referee: Matt Geringer
Note: Kim's yellow card missing from report but shown on broadcast

August 14 2	California United Strikers FC	1–1	Detroit City FC	Irvine, California
7:00 p.m. PDT	Hogbin (yellow card) 24'; Venegas 39' (o.g.); Capriotti (yellow card) 45+1'; Kwak (yellow card) 72'; Araneda (yellow card) 84'	Report; Broadcast	Rodriguez (yellow card) 50'; Filerman 63', (yellow card) 68'	Stadium: Championship Soccer Stadium; Attendance: 653; Referee: José Lara

August 21 3	Detroit City FC	3–0	San Diego 1904 FC	Hamtramck, Michigan
7:30 p.m. EDT	Rutz 3'; Filerman 22'; Saydee (yellow card) 84'; Espinal 90'	NISA Report; DCFC Report; Broadcast	Cuttler (yellow card) 31'; Ramos (yellow card) 58'	Stadium: Keyworth Stadium; Attendance: 4,664; Referee: Adam Zarrin
Note: Referee name shown in broadcast (2'); NISA Report incorrectly lists Anthony Manning as a starter for Detroit, it was actually Matt Lewis. Detroit Substitutes are also inaccurate in NISA Report; Javan Torre IN, James Filerman OUT (66'), Yazeed Matthews IN, Patricio Botello Faz OUT (66'), Richard Bryan IN, Kevin Venegas OUT (67'), Javi Steinwascher IN, George Chomakov OUT (80'), Darwin Espinal IN, Cyrus Saydee OUT (83'). The correct substitute information is shown in the DCFC Report.

August 29 4	Chicago House AC	0–1	Detroit City FC	Bridgeview, Illinois
6:05 p.m. CDT	Conner (yellow card) 56'; Kafari (yellow card) 71'	DCFC Report; NISA Report; Broadcast	Filerman (yellow card) 60'; Rodriguez 65' (pen.); Venegas (yellow card) 90'	Stadium: SeatGeek Stadium; Attendance: 1,013; Referee: Aleksandar Zhelyazkov
Note: Venegas' yellow missing from report, shown in broadcast. Report also missing fourth DCFC sub in 75' (Matthews IN, Botello Faz OUT) and Matthews is erroneously not listed as an available sub.

September 4 5	Chattanooga FC	1–2	Detroit City FC	Chattanooga, Tennessee
7:30 p.m. EDT	Russell (yellow card) 26'; Kasak (yellow card) 39'; Naglestad 55'; McKinley (yellow card) 58'; Dixon (red card) 63'	Report; Broadcast	Faz 42'; Lewis (yellow card) 45'; Matthews 88'	Stadium: Finley Stadium; Attendance: 1,946; Referee: Aleksandar Zhelyazkov
Note: Russell and McKinley yellows missing from report, shown on broadcast, Chattanooga 90th min sub missing from report (Rodriguez IN, Kasak OUT), shown in broadcast.

September 11 6	Detroit City FC	2–1	New Amsterdam FC	Hamtramck, Michigan
4:05 p.m. EDT	Saydee (yellow card) 8'; Carroll 13'; Rutz 75'; Bryan (yellow card) 82'; Venegas (yellow card) 85'; Torre (yellow card) 90'	Report; Broadcast	John-Brown 5'; Bedward (yellow card) 36'	Stadium: Keyworth Stadium; Attendance: 3,894; Referee: Gustavo Solorio
Note: Yellow card in 82nd erroneously credited to Connor Rutz instead of Richard Bryan, shown on broadcast.

September 15 7	Maryland Bobcats FC	0–4	Detroit City FC	Germantown, Maryland
7:30 p.m. EDT	Karpeh (yellow card) 6'; Caulker (yellow card) 20'; Possian (yellow card) 36'	Report; Broadcast	Faz 32'; Vaughan 48'; Rodriguez 55'; Filerman 63'	Stadium: Maryland SoccerPlex; Attendance: 292; Referee: Kyle Johnston
Note: With City up comfortably, lightning struck again in the 72nd minute of the match. This caused the match to end, as a 30-minute delay would have reached midnight which is when NISA rules require delayed games to end. With the second half being played, City was awarded the win and all three points. Note: Just before the final lightning strike Javi Steinwascher was subbed on for Connor Rutz in the 72nd minute. This is missing from the report but shown in the broadcast.

September 18 8	Detroit City FC	0–1	Stumptown AC	Hamtramck, Michigan
7:30 p.m. EDT	Vaughan (yellow card) 63'; Jirira (yellow card) 78'	Report; Broadcast	Williams (yellow card) 50'; Sosa (yellow card) 52'; Navia (yellow card) 68'; Nembhard 80'; Hines (yellow card) 88'	Stadium: Keyworth Stadium; Attendance: 3,969; Referee: Lorenzo Hernandez

September 25 9	Detroit City FC	1–0	Los Angeles Force	Hamtramck, Michigan
7:30 p.m. EDT	Venegas 45+1'	Report; Broadcast	Culwell (yellow card) 84'	Stadium: Keyworth Stadium; Attendance: 3,689; Referee: Lorenzo Hernandez
Note: Darwin Espinal sub for George Chomakov in 82nd minute missing from report, shown in broadcast

September 29 10	New Amsterdam FC	1–6	Detroit City FC	Hempstead, New York
8:00 p.m. EDT	Charles 56' (pen.); Bosua (yellow card) 79'; Kalley (yellow card) 82'	Report; Broadcast	Rodriguez 7' (pen.), (yellow card) 30'; Rutz 14'; Filerman 25'; Carroll 36', (yellow card) 53'; Espinal 61'; Matthews 84'	Stadium: James M. Shuart Stadium; Attendance: 422; Referee: William Randy Hoffman

October 2 11	Detroit City FC	0–0	Maryland Bobcats FC	Hamtramck, Michigan
7:30 p.m. EDT	Filerman (yellow card) 68'	Report; Broadcast	Pato (yellow card) 32'; Gray (yellow card) 63'; Forka (yellow card) 68'	Stadium: Keyworth Stadium; Attendance: 3,817; Referee: Adam Zarrin
Note: Report erroneously lists Benedek Tanyi as a starter for Detroit instead of James Vaughan, broadcast demonstrates this is wrong. Also, report missing Richard Forka's yellow card in the 68th minute, shown in broadcast.

October 9 12	Detroit City FC	1–0	Michigan Stars FC	Hamtramck, Michigan
4:00 p.m. EDT	Venegas (yellow card) 45'; Rodriguez 56'	Report; Broadcast	Lobsiger (yellow card) 68'; Tran (yellow card) 76'; Espinoza (yellow card) 89'	Stadium: Keyworth Stadium; Attendance: 4,053; Referee: Adam Zarrin
Note: Yazeed Matthews sub for Pato Botello-Faz in 73rd minute missing from report, shown in broadcast

October 16 13	San Diego 1904 FC	1–2	Detroit City FC	Pacific Highlands Ranch, San Diego
7:00 p.m. PDT	Seye (yellow card) 44'; Benito 62'; Ramos (yellow card) 68'; Prentice (yellow card) 83'	Report; Broadcast	Torre (yellow card) 47'; Rutz 51'; Carroll 70'	Stadium: Canyon Crest Stadium; Attendance: 259; Referee: Jose Lara
Note: Yellow card to Javan Torre in the 47th minute missing from report. Report also missing Yazeed Matthews sub for Pato Botello-Faz in the 84th minute, shown on broadcast.

October 23 14	Stumptown AC	0–3	Detroit City FC	Matthews, North Carolina
7:00 p.m. EDT	Legendre (yellow card) 7'; Navia (yellow card) 49'; Nembhard (yellow card) 75'	Report; Broadcast	Torre (yellow card) 48'; Botello Faz 52'; Lewis 57'; Rodriguez 88'	Stadium: Sportsplex at Matthews; Attendance: 362; Referee: Jose Lara

October 30 15	Detroit City FC	1–0	California United Strikers FC	Hamtramck, Michigan
4:00 p.m. EDT	Rodriguez 34' (pen.); Chomakov (yellow card) 42'	Report; Broadcast	Liborio (yellow card) 39'	Stadium: Keyworth Stadium; Attendance: 3,833; Referee: Matt Geringer
Note: Match report erroneously lists Javan Torre twice instead of Matt Lewis, shown in broadcast

November 6 16	Detroit City FC	2–0	Chattanooga FC	Hamtramck, Michigan
4:00 p.m. EDT	Carroll 20'; Vaughan (yellow card) 87'; Matthews 90+4'	Report; Broadcast	Hernandez (yellow card) 18'; DaSilva (yellow card) 25'; Dixon (yellow card) 90+3'	Stadium: Keyworth Stadium; Attendance: 4,721; Referee: Jervis Atagama

November 13 17	Los Angeles Force	0–0	Detroit City FC	Santa Ana, California
7:00 p.m. PST				Stadium: Valley High School
Note: Canceled due to COVID-19 outbreak among LA Force players. The 0-0 tie would count in the standings.

November 20 18	Michigan Stars FC	2–3	Detroit City FC	Romeo, Michigan
3:30 p.m. EST	Suchecki 23'; Schneider (yellow card) 37'; Aidoo (yellow card) 44'; Chalbaud (yellow card) 74'; Juncaj 77'	Report; Broadcast	Rutz 7'; Botello Faz 37'; Matthews 63'	Stadium: Romeo High School Stadium; Attendance: 2,214; Referee: Ernie Constantine
Note: Match report erroneously lists Richard Bryan as a starter instead of Tendai Jirira, broadcast shows this. Report also missing Armando Quezada sub for Nate Steinwascher in 73rd minute, also shown on broadcast.

== Squad statistics ==
As of Match played November 20, 2021

=== Appearances and goals ===
No.	Pos	Nat	Player	Total		Regular season	
No.	Pos	Nat	Player	Apps	Goals	Apps	Goals
Goalkeepers
1	GK	(United States) USA	Nate Steinwascher	16	0	16+0	0
13	GK	(United States) USA	Armando Quezada	2	0	1+1	0
87	GK	(United States) USA	Eric Perilla	0	0	0+0	0
Defenders
2	DF	(United States) USA	James Filerman	17	4	12+5	4
3	DF	(United States) USA	Javan Torre	11	0	9+2	0
4	DF	(United States) USA	Anthony Manning	1	1	1+0	1
5	DF	(Republic of Ireland) IRL	Stephen Carroll	17	4	17+0	4
12	DF	(Zimbabwe) ZIM	Tendai Jirira	13	0	8+5	0
15	DF	(United States) USA	Matt Lewis	15	2	15+0	2
22	DF	(United States) USA	Kevin Venegas	16	1	15+1	1
25	DF	(England) ENG	Richard Bryan	7	0	2+5	0
Midfielders
7	MF	(United States) USA	Roddy Green	1	0	0+1	0
10	MF	(Liberia) LBR	Cyrus Saydee	17	0	17+0	0
14	MF	(United States) USA	Javier Steinwascher	11	0	2+9	0
17	MF	(England) ENG	James Vaughan	11	1	7+4	1
21	MF	(United States) USA	Maxi Rodriguez	17	7	17+0	7
99	MF	(Bulgaria) BUL	George Chomakov	13	0	11+2	0
Forwards
11	FW	(United States) USA	Connor Rutz	16	5	16+0	5
19	FW	(Mexico) MEX	Pato Botello Faz	16	4	14+2	4
20	FW	(South Africa) RSA	Yazeed Matthews	13	4	1+12	4
23	FW	(Honduras) HON	Darwin Espinal	16	2	5+11	2

=== Goal scorers ===
Place	Position	Nation	Number	Name	Regular season
1	MF	(United States)	21	Maxi Rodriguez	7
2	FW	(United States)	11	Connor Rutz	5
3	DF	(United States)	2	James Filerman	4
3	DF	(Republic of Ireland)	5	Stephen Carroll	4
3	FW	(Mexico)	19	Pato Botello Faz	4
3	FW	(South Africa)	20	Yazeed Matthews	4
4	DF	(United States)	15	Matt Lewis	2
4	FW	(Honduras)	23	Darwin Espinal	2
5	DF	(United States)	4	Anthony Manning	1
5	MF	(England)	17	James Vaughan	1
5	DF	(United States)	22	Kevin Venegas	1

=== Disciplinary record ===
Number	Nation	Position	Name	Regular season	
Number	Nation	Position	Name	Booked	Sent off (straight red)
2	(United States)	DF	James Filerman	3	0
3	(United States)	DF	Javan Torre	3	0
5	(Republic of Ireland)	DF	Stephen Carroll	2	0
10	(Liberia)	MF	Cyrus Saydee	2	0
12	(Zimbabwe)	DF	Tendai Jirira	1	0
15	(United States)	MF	Matt Lewis	1	0
17	(England)	MF	James Vaughan	2	0
21	(United States)	MF	Maxi Rodriguez	2	0
22	(United States)	DF	Kevin Venegas	3	0
25	(England)	DF	Richard Bryan	1	0
