= 2023 FC Tulsa season =

FC Tulsa
2023 season
- Head coach: Blair Gavin
- Stadium: ONEOK Field; Tulsa, Oklahoma
- USL Championship: Conference: 10th Overall: 21st
- USL Cup: DNQ
- 2023 U.S. Open Cup: Second Round
- Black Gold Derby: Not Held
Route 66 Kit colors	Interstate Kit colors	Indigenous Peoples' Kit colors

The 2023 FC Tulsa season was the franchise's 9th season in the USL Championship, the second-tier professional soccer league in the United States. The team also participated in the 2023 U.S. Open Cup.

== Club ==
Squad no.	Name	Nationality	Position(s)	Date of birth (age)	Previous club
Goalkeepers
1	Austin Wormell	(United States)	GK	May 26, 1998 (age 28)	(United States) Rogers State Hillcats
24	Michael Nelson	(United States)	GK	February 10, 1995 (age 31)	(United States) Houston Dynamo 2
25	Dallas Odle	(United States)	GK	August 5, 2001 (age 25)	(Spain) CD Almuñécar City FC
Defenders
3	Justin Malou	(Senegal)	RB	January 6, 1998 (age 28)	(United States) Columbus Crew 2
4	Ruxi^{[sp]}	(Spain)	CB	April 11, 1995 (age 31)	(Finland) AC Oulu
12	Rashid Tetteh	(Ghana)	CB	July 14, 1995 (age 31)	(United States) New Mexico United
13	Jorge Corrales	(Cuba)	LB	May 20, 1991 (age 35)	(Canada) CF Montréal
17	Brett Levis	(Canada)	LB	March 29, 1993 (age 33)	(Canada) Valour FC
22	Bradley Bourgeois	(United States)	CB	April 13, 1994 (age 32)	(United States) Nashville SC
23	Chase Bromstedt	(United States)	LB	May 26, 1998 (age 28)	(United States) Kansas City Comets
26	Angel Bernal	(United States)	RB	February 26, 2005 (age 21)	(United States) FC Dallas Academy
30	Adam Armour	(United States)	LB	September 27, 2002 (age 24)	(United States) Charlotte FC
Midfielders
5	Tommy McCabe	(United States)	DM	December 15, 2003 (age 22)	(United States) Detroit City FC
6	Blaine Ferri	(United States)	CM	September 29, 2000 (age 25)	(United States) North Texas SC
8	Collin Fernandez	(Peru)	CM	February 13, 1997 (age 29)	(United States) Sporting Kansas City II
18	Nate Worth	(United States)	MF	February 26, 2007 (age 19)	(United States) New York Red Bulls II
28	Renan Mendoza	(United States)	MF	June 30, 2008 (age 18)	(United States) Tulsa SC Academy
48	Eric Bird	(United States)	CM	April 8, 1993 (age 33)	(United States) Houston Dynamo FC
88	Christopher Pearson	(Jamaica)	CM	January 21, 2003 (age 23)	(Jamaica) Cavalier F.C.
Forwards
7	Marcus Epps	(United States)	RW	January 16, 1995 (age 31)	(United States) Phoenix Rising
10	Phillip Goodrum	(United States)	CF	June 20, 1997 (age 29)	(United States) Memphis 901
19	Siad Haji	(Somalia)	RW	December 1, 1999 (age 26)	(United States) San Jose Earthquakes II
20	Milo Yosef	(Germany)	FW	September 11, 1998 (age 28)	(United States) Marshall Thundering Herd
21	Aimar Membrila	(United States)	RW	October 5, 2003 (age 22)	(United States) Tulsa SC Academy
29	Patrick Weah	(Liberia)	FW	December 15, 2003 (age 22)	(United States) Minnesota United FC
77	Moses Dyer	(New Zealand)	CF	March 21, 1997 (age 29)	(Canada) Valour FC
Out on Loan
-	Luca Sowinski	(United States)	AM	June 5, 2004 (age 22)	(United States) Barça Residency Academy
-	Watz Leazard	(Haiti)	RW	June 17, 2003 (age 23)	(Haiti) Real Hope FA

USL Academy player
On loan to Charlotte Independence
On loan from Charlotte FC
On loan from Minnesota United FC
On loan to Total 90 Futbol Academy (Haiti)

=== Staff ===
As of January 1, 2023

- (United States) Sam Doerr – president
- (United States) Blair Gavin – head coach
- (Republic of Ireland) Richie Ryan – first assistant coach
- (England) Matt Watson – second assistant coach
- (Jamaica) Donovan Ricketts – goalkeeping coach
- (United States) Johnathon Millwee – head athletic trainer

== Competitions ==
=== Preseason ===
FC Tulsa announced their full preseason schedule on January 19, 2023.

February 5 Scrimmage	Team Patina	0-2	Team Gold	Tulsa, Oklahoma
11:00 AM CST		Report	Mendoza 15+2' da Costa 30+1'	Stadium: Hurricane Soccer & Track Stadium
Note: Intrasquad scrimmage played in 2 15-minute halves

February 11 Preseason 1	Oral Roberts Golden Eagles	1-0	FC Tulsa	Tulsa, Oklahoma
1:00 PM CST	55'			Stadium: Case Soccer Complex

February 18 Preseason 2	San Antonio FC	1-7	FC Tulsa	San Antonio, Texas
1:00 PM CST	Dhillon 14'		Epps 49'; Bird 76'; Suarez 78', 88', 110'; Cabrera 82'; Trialist 111'	Stadium: Toyota Field
Note: Played in four 30-minute quarters.

February 25 Preseason 3	FC Tulsa	0-2	Union Omaha	Tulsa, Oklahoma
11:30 AM CST			Meza 9'; Gil 54'	Stadium: Hurricane Soccer & Track Stadium
Note: Split squad match

February 25 Preseason 4	Tulsa Golden Hurricane	0-4	FC Tulsa	Tulsa, Oklahoma
1:00 PM CST			Pearson 12', 25' da Costa 17'; Dyer 44'	Stadium: Hurricane Soccer & Track Stadium
Note: Split squad match

March 4 Preseason 5	FC Tulsa	1-2	Sporting Kansas City II	Tulsa, Oklahoma
1:00 PM CST	Dyer 63'		25'; 83'	Stadium: Hurricane Soccer & Track Stadium

March 4 Preseason 6	Tulsa Golden Hurricane	2-1	FC Tulsa	Tulsa, Oklahoma
6:00 PM CST	33'; 47'		Vassell 35'	Stadium: Hurricane Soccer & Track Stadium

=== USL Championship ===
==== Standings — Eastern Conference ====
Pos	Team	Pld	W	L	T	GF	GA	GD	Pts	Qualification
1	Pittsburgh Riverhounds SC (S)	34	19	5	10	50	29	+21	67	Playoffs
2	Tampa Bay Rowdies	34	19	9	6	60	39	+21	63	Playoffs
3	Charleston Battery	34	17	9	8	47	43	+4	59	Playoffs
4	Memphis 901 FC	34	14	10	10	59	53	+6	52	Playoffs
5	Louisville City FC	34	14	12	8	41	44	−3	50	Playoffs
6	Indy Eleven	34	13	11	10	46	38	+8	49	Playoffs
7	Birmingham Legion FC	34	14	16	4	44	53	−9	46	Playoffs
8	Detroit City FC	34	11	15	8	30	39	−9	41	Playoffs
9	Miami FC	34	11	15	8	43	44	−1	41	
10	FC Tulsa	34	10	15	9	43	55	−12	39	
11	Loudoun United FC	34	7	23	4	36	61	−25	25	
12	Hartford Athletic	34	4	24	6	40	79	−39	18	

Source: USL Championship Standings
Rules for classification: 1) head-to-head points; 2) head-to-head goal differential; 3) points-per game within conference; 4) total wins; 5) total goal differential; 6) total goals scored; 7) points earned against top four Conference finishers; 8) disciplinary points; 9) coin toss or drawing of lots
(S) Players' Shield winner

==== Match results ====
March 11 1	Miami FC	1-1	FC Tulsa	Westchester, Florida
5:00 p.m. EST	Valot 26'	Report	Yousef 28'	Stadium: Riccardo Silva Stadium; Attendance: 2,092; Referee: John Griggs

March 17 2	Birmingham Legion	3-2	FC Tulsa	Birmingham, Alabama
7:00 p.m. CDT	Pasher 4', 83'; Brett 90+2'	Report	da Costa 49'; Epps 54'	Stadium: Protective Stadium; Referee: Elvis Osmanovic

March 25 3	FC Tulsa	3-0	Loudoun United FC	Tulsa, Oklahoma
7:30 p.m. CDT	Ferri 45+1'; Yousef 46'; Epps 90+6'	Report		Stadium: ONEOK Field; Attendance: 4,645; Referee: Mathew Corrigan

March 28 4	FC Tulsa	0-0	Pittsburgh Riverhounds SC	Tulsa, Oklahoma
7:00 p.m. CDT		Report		Stadium: ONEOK Field; Attendance: 2,177; Referee: Melvin Rivas

March 31 5	FC Tulsa	2-2	El Paso Locomotive FC	Tulsa, Oklahoma
8:00 p.m. CDT	da Costa 33'; Dyer 90+1'	Report	Solignac 38', 68'	Stadium: ONEOK Field; Attendance: 4,003; Referee: Brandon Stevis

April 8 6	San Diego Loyal	2-1	FC Tulsa	San Diego, California
2:00 p.m. PDT	Conway 63'; Fernandez 90+4' (o.g.)	Report	da Costa 65'	Stadium: Torero Stadium; Attendance: 4,412; Referee: Corbyn May

April 15 7	FC Tulsa	1-2	Charleston Battery	Tulsa, Oklahoma
5:00 p.m. CDT	Epps 14'	Report	Markanich 5'; Polvara 50'	Stadium: ONEOK Field; Attendance: 4,007; Referee: Elton García

April 29 8	FC Tulsa	1-1	Sacramento Republic FC	Tulsa, Oklahoma
5:00 p.m. CDT	Dyer 76'	Report	Herrera 54'	Stadium: ONEOK Field; Attendance: 5,004; Referee: Elvis Osmanovic

May 6 9	Detroit City FC	1-1	FC Tulsa	Hamtramck, Michigan
6:30 p.m. CDT	Diop 10'	Report	Suarez 45' (pen.)	Stadium: Keyworth Stadium; Attendance: 5,138; Referee: Eric Tattersall

May 13 10	Las Vegas Lights FC	1-1	FC Tulsa	Las Vegas, Nevada
7:30 p.m. PDT	Botello Faz 68' (pen.)	Report	Bird 61'	Stadium: Cashman Field; Referee: Ricardo Fierro

May 19 11	FC Tulsa	1-2	Memphis 901 FC	Tulsa, Oklahoma
8:00 p.m. CDT	Suárez 83'	Report	Pickering 54'; Molloy 65'	Stadium: ONEOK Field; Attendance: 4,577; Referee: Alejo Calume

May 24 12	Louisville City FC	1-2	FC Tulsa	Louisville, Kentucky
6:30 p.m. CDT	González 29'	Report	Bird 77'; Goodrum 89'	Stadium: Lynn Family Stadium; Attendance: 11,434; Referee: Abdou Ndiaye

May 31 13	Monterey Bay FC	0-0	FC Tulsa	Seaside, California
7:00 p.m. PDT		Report		Stadium: Cardinale Stadium; Attendance: 3,431; Referee: Gerald Flores

June 9 14	Loudoun United FC	3-1	FC Tulsa	Leesburg, Virginia
7:00 p.m. EDT		Report		Stadium: Segra Field; Attendance: 4,007; Referee: Amiel Aleman

June 17 15	FC Tulsa	0-3	Orange County SC	Tulsa, Oklahoma
8:00 p.m. CDT		Report		Stadium: ONEOK Field; Attendance: 4,333; Referee: José Carlos Rivero

June 21 16	Memphis 901 FC	4-0	FC Tulsa	Memphis, Tennessee
7:00 p.m. CDT		Report		Stadium: AutoZone Park; Referee: Melvin Rivas

June 30 17	FC Tulsa	3-2	Detroit City FC	Tulsa, Oklahoma
8:00 p.m. CDT	Goodrum 36' (pen.), 82'; Epps 89'	Report	Lewis 40'; Carroll 74'	Stadium: ONEOK Field; Attendance: 5,565; Referee: Olvin Oliva

July 8 18	Indy Eleven	0-1	FC Tulsa	Indianapolis, Indiana
6:00 p.m. CDT		Report	Dyer 5'	Stadium: IUPUI Carroll Stadium; Attendance: 9,153; Referee: Benjamin Meyer

July 12 19	FC Tulsa	1-0	Miami FC	Tulsa, Oklahoma
8:00 p.m. CDT	Epps 71'	Report		Stadium: ONEOK Field; Attendance: 4,583; Referee: Izlen Peksenar

July 15 20	FC Tulsa	3-2	Hartford Athletic	Tulsa, Oklahoma
8:00 p.m. CDT	Epps 13'; Goodrum 35', 90+5'	Report	Amoh 24'; 60' (o.g.)	Stadium: ONEOK Field; Attendance: 4,110; Referee: Velimir Stefanovic

July 21 21	FC Tulsa	2-1	Rio Grande Valley FC Toros	Tulsa, Oklahoma
8:00 p.m. CDT	Yosef 7'; Goodrum 31' (pen.)	Report	Coronado (red card) 29'; Galindrez 74'; Nodarse (red card) 83'	Stadium: ONEOK Field; Attendance: 4,441; Referee: Elijio Arreguin

July 29 22	Tampa Bay Rowdies	3-0	FC Tulsa	St. Petersburg, Florida
7:30 p.m. EDT		Report		Stadium: Al Lang Stadium; Referee: Eric Tattersall

August 4 23	FC Tulsa	0-3	Louisville City FC	Tulsa, Oklahoma
8:00 p.m. CDT		Report		Stadium: ONEOK Field; Attendance: 4,277; Referee: Joshua Encarnación

August 9 24	Colorado Springs Switchbacks	1-1	FC Tulsa	Colorado Springs, Colorado
7:00 p.m. MDT	Fjeldberg 79'	Report	Yosef 42'	Stadium: Weidner Field; Attendance: 8,023; Referee: Elvis Osmanovic
Note: Aired on ESPN2

August 18 25	FC Tulsa	1-2	Tampa Bay Rowdies	Tulsa, Oklahoma
8:00 p.m. CDT		Report		Stadium: ONEOK Field; Attendance: 4,022; Referee: Adam Kilpatrick

August 23 26	FC Tulsa	1-3	Birmingham Legion FC	Tulsa, Oklahoma
7:00 p.m. CDT		Report		Stadium: ONEOK Field; Attendance: 3,927; Referee: Calin Radosav

August 26 27	New Mexico United	2-1	FC Tulsa	Albuquerque, New Mexico
7:00 p.m. MDT		Report		Stadium: RGCU Field at Isotopes Park; Referee: Gerald Flores

September 3 28	FC Tulsa	2-1	San Antonio FC	Tulsa, Oklahoma
7:30 p.m. CDT	Bird 14'; Epps 68'	Report	Zouhir 80'	Stadium: Hurricane Soccer & Track Stadium; Attendance: 2,587; Referee: Nabil Bensalah
Note: First USL match played at the University of Tulsa.

September 9 29	FC Tulsa	0-0	Phoenix Rising FC	Tulsa, Oklahoma
7:30 p.m. CDT		Report		Stadium: ONEOK Field; Attendance: 4,821; Referee: Matthew Corrigan

September 16 30	Oakland Roots SC	0-1	FC Tulsa	Oakland, California
7:00 p.m. PDT				Stadium: Laney Football Stadium

September 23 31	Charleston Battery	2-1	FC Tulsa	Charleston, South Carolina
7:30 p.m. EDT				Stadium: Patriots Point Soccer Complex

September 30 32	Pittsburgh Riverhounds SC	3-2	FC Tulsa	Pittsburgh, Pennsylvania
7:00 p.m. EDT				Stadium: Highmark Stadium

October 7 33	FC Tulsa	1-2	Indy Eleven	Tulsa, Oklahoma
7:30 p.m. CDT				Stadium: ONEOK Field; Attendance: 6,444

October 14 34	Hartford Athletic	2-5	FC Tulsa	Hartford, Connecticut
7:00 p.m. EDT				Stadium: Trinity Health Stadium

=== U.S. Open Cup ===
April 5 Second Round	Tulsa Athletic (NPSL) (Oklahoma)	1–0	(Oklahoma) FC Tulsa	Tulsa, OK
7:00 p.m. CDT	Harris 58'	Report		Stadium: Athletic Community Field at Hicks Park; Attendance: 1,025; Referee: Brandon Gardner
Note: 2nd Tulsa Derby
