= Joseph Aidoo =

Joseph Aidoo may refer to:

- Joseph Aidoo (Liberian footballer) (born 1995)
- Joseph Aidoo (Ghanaian footballer) (born 1995)
- Joseph Aidoo (politician) (born 1957), Ghanaian politician
