= Ibrahim Conteh =

Sierra Leone professional footballer

Personal information
- Full name: Ibrahim Posle Conteh
- Date of birth: 2 November 1996 (age 30)
- Place of birth: Freetown, Sierra Leone
- Height: 1.75 m (5 ft 9 in)
- Position: Midfielder

Senior career*
Years	Team	Apps	(Gls)
2008–2009	Kallon	10	(6)
2009–2011	Old Edwardians	13	(7)
2012–2015	Kallon	12	(8)
2015	Pelita Bandung Raya	4	(1)
2016–2017	Barito Putera	17	(2)
2017	PS TNI	3	(0)
2017	Wingate & Finchley	0	(0)
2018–2019	PSIS Semarang	29	(5)
2019	Persipura Jayapura	25	(1)
2020–2021	Detroit City	6	(0)
2021	Al-Ittifaq Maqaba	0	(0)
2022	Albion San Diego	10	(0)
2022	Charlotte Independence	9	(0)

International career^{‡}
2019	Sierra Leone	2	(0)
- * Club domestic league appearances and goals as of 16 October 2022 ‡ National team caps and goals as of 17 November 2019

Ibrahim Posle Conteh (born 2 November 1996) is a Sierra Leonean professional footballer who plays as a midfielder.

== International career ==
In 2014, Conteh played with the Sierra Leone national under-20 team scoring one goal in four games. He made his debut for the senior team in a 1-0 win over Liberia on 8 September 2019, playing 90 minutes in the 2022 FIFA World Cup qualification.
