= Joseph Aidoo (Liberian footballer) =

Liberian footballer (born 1995)

Personal information
- Date of birth: 24 August 1995 (age 31)
- Place of birth: Monrovia, Liberia
- Height: 1.83 m (6 ft 0 in)
- Position: Defender

Youth career
- 2006–2012: Philadelphia Lone Star

Senior career*
Years	Team	Apps	(Gls)
2013–2016	Philadelphia Lone Star	35	(13)
2017–2018	Uppsala Kurd FK	14	(5)
2017–2018	Türkischer SV Oldenburg	19	(6)
2018	Llapi Besianë Podujevë	0	(0)
2018–2019	Philadelphia Lone Star	13	(6)
2019–2021	Michigan Stars	27	(0)

International career^{‡}
2018–2019	Liberia	2	(0)
- * Club domestic league appearances and goals as of 14 January 2023 ‡ National team caps and goals as of 17:36, 30 September 2019 (UTC)

Joseph Aidoo (born 24 August 1995) is a Liberian professional footballer who plays as a defender for the Liberia national team.

== Club career ==
=== Early career ===
Born in Monrovia, Liberia, Aidoo arrived in the United States and began playing in the Philadelphia Lone Star youth system in 2006.

==== Philadelphia Lone Star FC ====
Aidoo made his top-tier league appearance in 2013 playing for Philadelphia Lone Star of the National Premier Soccer League for three seasons, scoring 13 goals in 35 appearances.

==== Uppsala Kurd FK ====
Ahead of the 2017–18 season, he joined Swedish football club Uppsala Kurd FK.

==== Türkischer SV Oldenburg ====
On 1 January 2018, Aidoo joined the German Landesliga Weser-Ems side Türkischer SV Oldenburg. He made his debut for the club away to SC Melle in a 2–1 loss on 18 February.

==== Llapi Besianë Podujevë ====
Aidoo signed a one-year deal with Kosovo Superliga club. Within a month, he opted for mutual termination of his contract after which he headed back to the United States.

==== Philadelphia Lone Star ====
Aidoo returned to his previous club Philadelphia Lone Star and signed a 12-month contract.

==== Michigan Stars FC ====
On 1 January 2019, Aidoo signed with Michigan Stars FC in the National Premier Soccer League on a free transfer. He established himself as a key player in the squad.

In 2020, He further extended his stay with Michigan Stars ahead of their first professional season in the National Independent Soccer Association Spring 2020. He made his debut on 29 February against California United Strikers.

== International career ==
Aidoo made his international debut for Liberia on 22 July 2018 in a 0–0 friendly draw against Sierra Leone. His second appearance for Liberia was on 30 September 2019 in another 0–0 friendly draw, against Botswana.
