= Ryan Peterson (soccer, born 1995) =

American soccer player (born 1995)

Personal information
- Date of birth: December 26, 1995 (age 30)
- Place of birth: Budd Lake, New Jersey
- Height: 5 ft 11 in (1.80 m)
- Position: Winger

Team information
- Current team: Ocean City Nor'easters
- Number: 18

Youth career
- Players Development Academy

College career
Years	Team	Apps	(Gls)
2014–2015	NC State Wolfpack	33	(3)
2016–2017	Rutgers Scarlet Knights	30	(4)

Senior career*
Years	Team	Apps	(Gls)
2015	Ocean City Nor'easters		
2019	FC Motown	8	(0)
2019	Detroit City FC	0	(0)
2020	Stumptown Athletic	2	(0)
2020	Detroit City FC	3	(0)
2021	FC Motown	18	(7)
2021	San Diego 1904 FC	9	(2)
2022	New Jersey Alliance FC	1	(0)
2022	FC Motown	14	(1)
2022	Charlotte Independence	1	(0)
2023–	Ocean City Nor'easters		
- * Club domestic league appearances and goals as of October 1, 2022

Ryan Peterson (born December 26, 1995) is an American soccer player who plays for Ocean City Nor'easters.

== Career ==
=== Youth and college ===
Peterson grew up in the Budd Lake section of Mount Olive Township, New Jersey where he attended Mount Olive High School and played youth soccer for Players Development Academy (PDA). While with PDA, he helped the Under-17/18 Academy team to a U.S. Soccer Development Academy U-17/18 Championship in 2014. In the final on Saturday, July 19, Peterson scored the team's second goal, assisted by future Major League Soccer player Brian White, against Bethesda-Olney (MD) in the 2–0 win at StubHub Center in Carson, California. Peterson also played college soccer for four years at two NCAA Division I universities. He attended North Carolina State University for two years and played in 33 games while scoring three goals. Following his sophomore year, he transferred to Rutgers University and played two more seasons, scoring four goals in 30 games.

=== Amateur ===
While still attending North Carolina State, Peterson spent the summer of 2015 playing with the Ocean City Nor'easters of the Premier Developmental League. In 2019, Peterson joined National Premier Soccer League side Detroit City FC following the conclusion of the regular season. He spent the late summer and early fall with the club competing in the 2019 NPSL Members Cup tournament. Detroit went on the win the competition with Peterson competing in a majority of the team's games. He also scored the lone goal in Detroit's friendly against the Philadelphia Fury, a professional side in the National Independent Soccer Association which Detroit was in the process of joining.

Prior to this in 2019 Peterson also appeared with USL Championship side Pittsburgh Riverhounds SC in a pre-season friendly against the Cleveland State Vikings men's soccer team. However he was not signed to the final roster ahead of the regular season.

==== FC Motown ====
Peterson spent multiple stints with Morristown, New Jersey amateur side FC Motown prior to and in-between playing with professional teams. While mainly competing in the National Premier Soccer League and later USL League Two, he also made appearances for the club in their state and regional leagues across USASA Region I. He made his NPSL debut on Saturday, May 18, 2019, coming on as a first half substitute against the Electric City Shock SC in a 3–1 road win.

During his third year with the team in 2022 Peterson had his most successful season with the club. On April 1, following a successful protest by Motown, Peterson scored the game-winning goal against West Chester United SC in the 90th minute of their 2022 U.S. Open Cup First Round replay. He played in all three of Motown's tournament matches that year, plus the original first round match that was later replayed. In league, Motown won the 2022 NPSL National Championship with Peterson scoring the opening goal against Crossfire Redmond in the final.

=== Professional ===
==== National Independent Soccer Association ====
On February 25, 2020, Peterson signed his first professional contract with Stumptown Athletic of the third division National Independent Soccer Association. He started both of the team's games that season before the COVID-19 pandemic forced the cancellation of the Spring Season.

On August 11 Peterson returned to Detroit City FC, now playing in NISA, ahead of the Fall 2020 season. In the 2020 NISA Fall Championship he scored the game-winning goal against Oakland Roots SC in the 85th minute to give Detroit its first professional title. He departed the team following the fall season.

On October 8, 2021, Peterson signed with San Diego 1904 FC.

==== Charlotte Independence ====
Peterson signed with USL League One club Charlotte Independence on September 22, 2022. He made his first appearance on Saturday, October 1, as a second-half substitute in a 3–1 loss to the Chattanooga Red Wolves SC.

== Career statistics ==
As of matches played October 1, 2022

Club	Season	League			Cup (Note: Includes appearances in U.S. Open Cup)		Other (Note: Includes appearances in league playoffs and NPSL Members Cup)		Total	
Club	Season	Division	Apps	Goals	Apps	Goals	Apps	Goals	Apps	Goals
FC Motown	2019	National Premier Soccer League	8	0	0	0	3	0	11	0
Detroit City FC	2019	National Premier Soccer League	0	0	0	0	9	2	9	2
Stumptown Athletic	2020	National Independent Soccer Association	2	0	0	0	0	0	2	0
Detroit City FC	2020	National Independent Soccer Association	3	0	0	0	4	1	7	1
FC Motown	2021	National Premier Soccer League	8	4	0	0	4	2	12	6
FC Motown	2021	USL League Two	10	3	0	0	0	0	10	3
San Diego 1904 FC	2021	National Independent Soccer Association	9	2	0	0	0	0	9	2
New Jersey Alliance FC	2022	NISA Nation	1	0	0	0	0	0	1	0
FC Motown	2022	National Premier Soccer League	6	0	3	1	6	1	15	2
FC Motown	2022	USL League Two	8	1	0	0	0	0	8	1
Charlotte Independence	2022	USL League One	1	0	0	0	0	0	1	0
Career total			56	10	3	1	26	6	85	17

== Honors ==
Detroit City FC

- NPSL Members Cup: 2019
- NISA Fall Championship: 2020
- NISA Independent Cup Great Lakes Region: 2020

FC Motown

- NPSL National Championship: 2022
- NPSL East Regional Championship: 2022
- NPSL Keystone Conference Championship: 2019, 2021, 2022
- New Jersey Soccer Association Men's Open State Cup: 2021–22
