= Uppsala Kurd FK =

Swedish football club

Uppsala Kurd FK was a Swedish football club located in Uppsala.
