= Austin Rogers (soccer) =

American professional soccer player (born 1995)

Personal information
- Full name: Austin Jeffrey Rogers
- Date of birth: August 10, 1995 (age 31)
- Place of birth: Portland, Oregon, United States
- Height: 1.87 m (6 ft 2 in)
- Position: Goalkeeper

Team information
- Current team: PDX FC
- Number: 99

Youth career
- 2002–2007: Eastside United
- 2008–2010: Oregon Soccer Academy
- 2010–2013: Eastside United

Senior career*
Years	Team	Apps	(Gls)
2014	Kitsap Pumas (indoor)	2	(0)
2015	Kitsap Pumas	0	(0)
2016	Besa Kavajë	11	(0)
2016	Bayangol	4	(0)
2017	FC Ulaanbaatar	18	(0)
2018	Ulaanbaatar City	18	(0)
2019	Dacia Unirea Brăila	2	(0)
2019	Portland Timbers U23s	2	(0)
2019	KF Tërbuni Pukë	10	(0)
2020	Detroit City	2	(0)
2020	KF Vushtrria	14	(0)
2021	PDX FC	8	(0)
2021	San Diego 1904	6	(0)
2022–2024	PDX FC	12	(0)
2025	Portland Bangers FC	0	(0)
2025–	Tacoma Stars (indoor)	0	(0)
2025–	Tacoma Stars Reserves (indoor)	3	(0)
- * Club domestic league appearances and goals as of 28 February 2020 ‡ National team caps and goals as of 12 September 2015

Austin J. Rogers (born August 10, 1995) is an American professional soccer player who plays as a goalkeeper for San Diego 1904 in the National Independent Soccer Association. His father, Glenn Rogers, also played professionally, most notably for the Portland Timbers.
