= Sebastian Capozucchi =

Chilean footballer (born 1995)

Personal information
- Full name: Sebastian Nicol Capozucchi Collant
- Date of birth: 23 December 1995 (age 30)
- Place of birth: Villa Alemana, Chile
- Height: 6 ft 0 in (1.84 m)
- Position: Defender

Team information
- Current team: Don Carlo Misilmeri

Youth career
- Deportivo Merlo

Senior career*
Years	Team	Apps	(Gls)
2016	New York Cosmos B		
2016–2017	Platense	0	(0)
2017	New York Cosmos B		
2017–2018	Troina	0	(0)
2017–2018	→ Paternò (loan)		
2018–2019	Marina Di Ragusa	19	(0)
2019	Atlantic City	8	(0)
2019	Milwaukee Torrent	9	(1)
2020	Detroit City	5	(0)
2021–2022	Chattanooga Red Wolves	29	(0)
2023	Chattanooga FC	16	(0)
2024	Michigan Stars	4	(0)
2024–	Don Carlo Misilmeri		
- * Club domestic league appearances and goals as of October 16, 2022

Sebastian Nicol Capozucchi Collant (born 23 December 1995) is a Chilean professional footballer who plays as a defender for Italian club Don Carlo Misilmeri.

== Club career ==
=== New York Cosmos B and Platense ===
Capozucchi began his career with NPSL side New York Cosmos B, joining the club in 2016. He re-signed with the club for their 2017 season following a spell in Argentina with Platense, where he appeared for the club's reserve team.

=== Move to Italy ===
Over three years, Capozucchi played for a trio of Serie D side Italy. Starting with Troina in 2017, he then spent a season on loan with Paternò, where he and the team went on to allow the second fewest goals in the league. He was then signed by Marina Di Ragusa in 2018, helping the club to win the league title that season.

=== Return to the United States ===
In 2019, Capozucchi returned to the United States and spent time in the NPSL again with Atlantic City FC. He then joined Milwaukee Torrent later in the year for the NPSL Founders Cup.

=== Detroit City FC ===
In 2020, Capozucchi signed with NISA side Detroit City, making five regular season appearances and two post-season appearances for the club during a season affected by the COVID-19 pandemic.

=== Chattanooga Red Wolves ===
On March 5, 2021, Capozucchi signed with USL League One side Chattanooga Red Wolves. He made his debut on May 8, 2021, starting in a 1–0 win over North Texas SC.

=== Don Carlo Misilmeri ===
In October 2024, Capozucchi returned to Italy and joined Don Carlo Misilmeri in the Eccellenza Sicilia.

== Personal life ==
Capozucchi was born in Chile, born to a Chilean mother and Argentine father, Walter Capozucchi, who was also a professional soccer player. Capozucchi lived in Argentina, Chile and Guatemala all before the age of nine. After which, Sebastian moved to New Jersey in the United States. He played prep soccer at Memorial High School in West New York, New Jersey, graduating in 2013.
