= Javan Torre =

American soccer player

Personal information
- Full name: Javan Rene Torre Howell
- Date of birth: October 20, 1993 (age 33)
- Place of birth: Santa Monica, California, United States
- Height: 6 ft 2 in (1.88 m)
- Position: Defender

Youth career
- 2011–2012: LA Galaxy

College career
| Years | Team | Apps | (Gls) |
| 2012–2015 | UCLA Bruins | 56 | (2) |

Senior career*
| Years | Team | Apps | (Gls) |
| 2014–2015 | Ventura County Fusion | 16 | (0) |
| 2017 | Ventura County Fusion | 2 | (0) |
| 2017–2018 | FSV Frankfurt | 24 | (1) |
| 2019–2020 | Las Vegas Lights | 44 | (4) |
| 2021 | Detroit City | 12 | (0) |

International career
| 2012–2013 | United States U20 | 9 | (0) |
- * Club domestic league appearances and goals

Javan Rene Torre Howell (born October 20, 1993) is an American former professional soccer player who played as a defender.

== Career ==
=== Youth and college ===
Torre played four years of college soccer at the University of California, Los Angeles between 2012 and 2015.

While at college, Torre also appeared for USL League Two side Ventura County Fusion in both 2014 and 2015. He returned to the club in 2017 as well to make two appearances.

=== Professional ===
On January 19, 2016, Torre was selected in the third round (56th overall) of the 2016 MLS SuperDraft by Colorado Rapids. However, he was not signed by the club.

Torre moved to Germany to play for Regionalliga Südwest side FSV Frankfurt during their 2017–18 season, making 24 appearances for the club.

On January 19, 2019, it was announced Torre had joined USL Championship side Las Vegas Lights ahead of their 2019 season.

On February 19, 2021, Torre joined NISA side Detroit City FC ahead of the 2021 season.
