= Anthony Manning =

American soccer player (born 1992)

Personal information
- Date of birth: September 4, 1992 (age 34)
- Place of birth: Mesquite, Texas, United States
- Height: 1.94 m (6 ft 4 in)
- Position: Defender

College career
Years	Team	Apps	(Gls)
2011–2014	Saint Louis Billikens	54	(5)

Senior career*
Years	Team	Apps	(Gls)
2015	Portland Timbers 2	6	(0)
2015–2016	Portland Timbers	0	(0)
2015–2016	→ Portland Timbers 2 (loan)	11	(0)
2017	Indy Eleven	5	(0)
2018	Motala AIF	10	(1)
2021	Detroit City	10	(3)
2023–	Dallas Dynamo		
- * Club domestic league appearances and goals as of November 10, 2021

Anthony Manning (born September 4, 1992) is an American soccer player who plays for Dallas Dynamo in the United Premier Soccer League.

== Career ==
=== College ===
Manning spent his entire college career at Saint Louis University. He made a total of 76 appearances for the Billikens and tallied five goals and two assists.

=== Professional ===
Manning was selected in the third round (52nd overall) of the 2015 MLS SuperDraft by the Portland Timbers. On March 29, he signed a professional contract with USL affiliate club Portland Timbers 2. He made his professional debut that same day in a 3–1 victory over Real Monarchs SLC.

Manning was signed to Portland Timbers MLS squad on July 13, 2015.

Manning signed with North American Soccer League side Indy Eleven on March 9, 2017.

On February 15, 2021, Detroit City FC announced that they had signed Manning pending approval from NISA and the USSF.

== Honors ==
=== Club ===
Portland Timbers

- MLS Cup: 2015
- Western Conference (playoffs): 2015
