= Bakie Goodman =

American soccer player (born 1995)

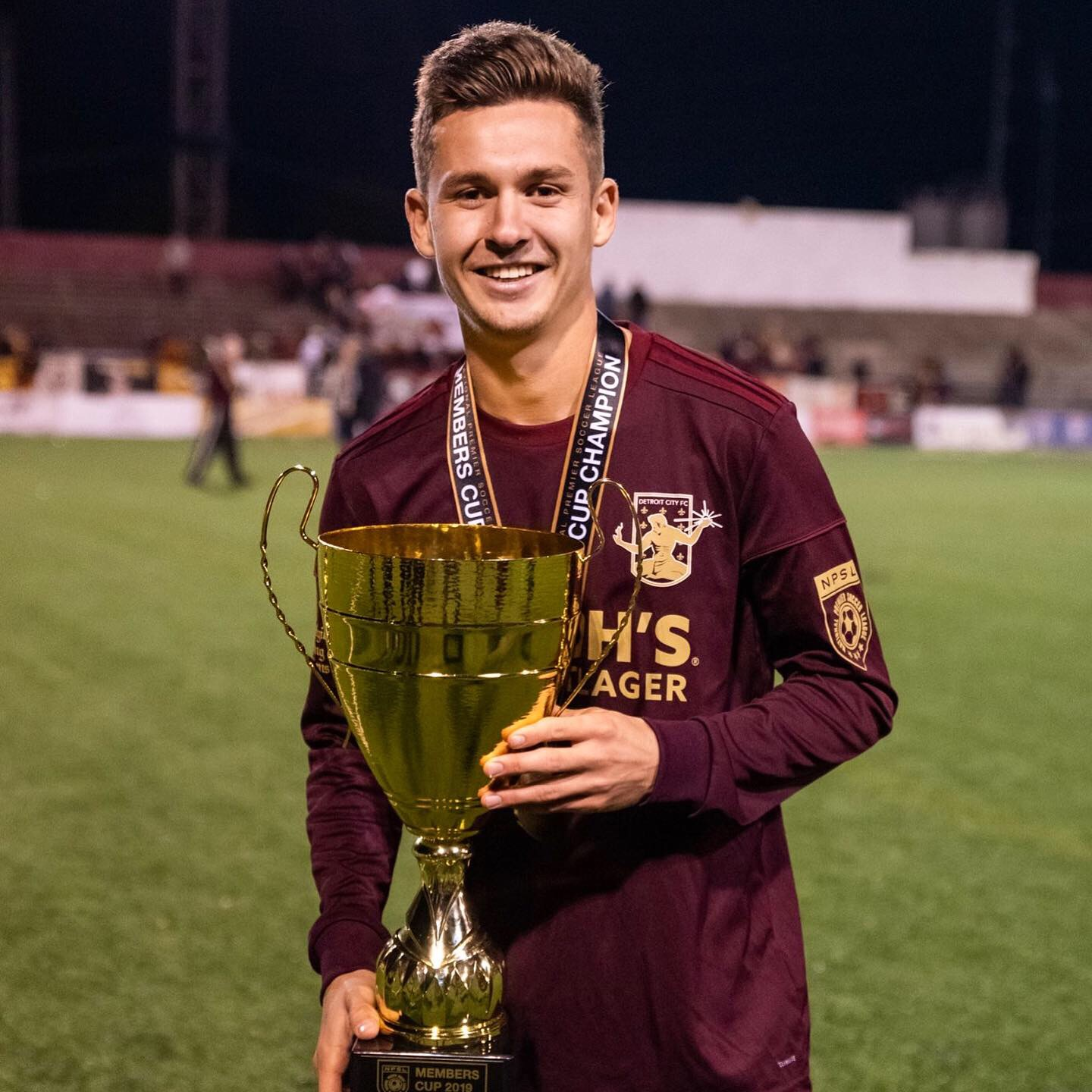
- Goodman with Detroit City in 2019

Personal information
- Full name: Douglas Goodman
- Date of birth: February 28, 1995 (age 31)
- Place of birth: Nashville, Tennessee, U.S.
- Height: 1.76 m (5 ft 9 in)
- Position: Midfielder

Youth career
- 2011–2013: Clearwater Chargers

College career
Years	Team	Apps	(Gls)
2013–2016	Georgetown Hoyas	80	(7)

Senior career*
Years	Team	Apps	(Gls)
2014	IMG Academy Bradenton	8	(0)
2017	Detroit City	15	(2)
2018	Pittsburgh Riverhounds	2	(0)
2019–2020	Detroit City	21	(1)
- * Club domestic league appearances and goals as of April 14, 2021

Douglas "Bakie" Goodman (born February 28, 1995) is an American soccer player.

== Career ==
=== College ===
Goodman spent his entire college career at Georgetown University between 2013 and 2016, where he made 80 appearances, scoring 7 goals and tallying 12 assists in his town with the Hoyas.

In 2014, Goodman played with USL League Two side IMG Academy Bradenton.

=== Professional ===
Goodman was selected in the third round (56th overall) of the 2017 MLS SuperDraft by Seattle Sounders FC. He trained with Seattle's USL affiliate Seattle Sounders FC 2, but was released a week before the beginning of the season.

Following his release by Seattle, Goodman joined NPSL side Detroit City FC for their 2017 season.

On February 23, 2018, Goodman signed for USL side Pittsburgh Riverhounds SC.

Goodman rejoined Detroit City FC on 4 February 2019.
