= Kevin Venegas =

American soccer player

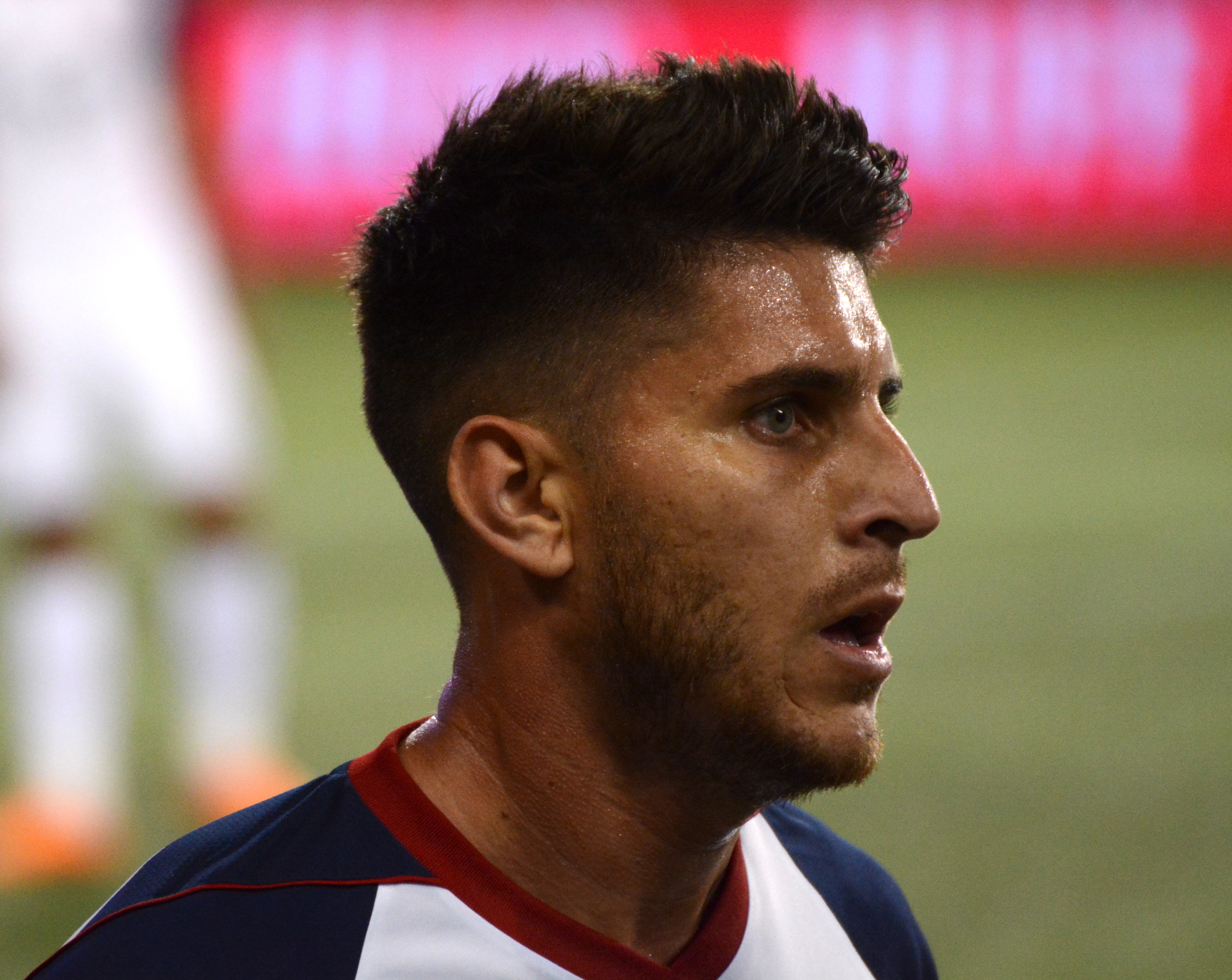
- Venegas playing for Indy Eleven in 2018

Personal information
- Full name: Kevin Venegas
- Date of birth: July 29, 1989 (age 37)
- Place of birth: Lakewood, California, United States
- Height: 1.78 m (5 ft 10 in)
- Positions: Fullback; midfielder

College career
Years	Team	Apps	(Gls)
2008–2011	Cal State Fullerton Titans	74	(16)

Senior career*
Years	Team	Apps	(Gls)
2010	Orange County Blue Star	14	(4)
2012–2016	Minnesota United	108	(5)
2017	Minnesota United	6	(0)
2018	Indy Eleven	22	(1)
2019	New York Cosmos	30	(0)
2020–2021	Detroit City	60	(2)
- * Club domestic league appearances and goals as of April 16, 2021

Kevin Venegas (born July 29, 1989) is an American soccer player.

== Career ==
=== College and amateur ===
In 2010, while at Cal State Fullerton, Venegas put together a career year for the Titans starting in all 21 matches and finished with seven goals and three assists. He finished his career at Fullerton with 74 appearances, 16 goals and 11 assists.

Venegas also spent the summer of 2010 with the Orange County Blue Star in the USL Premier Development League.

=== Professional ===
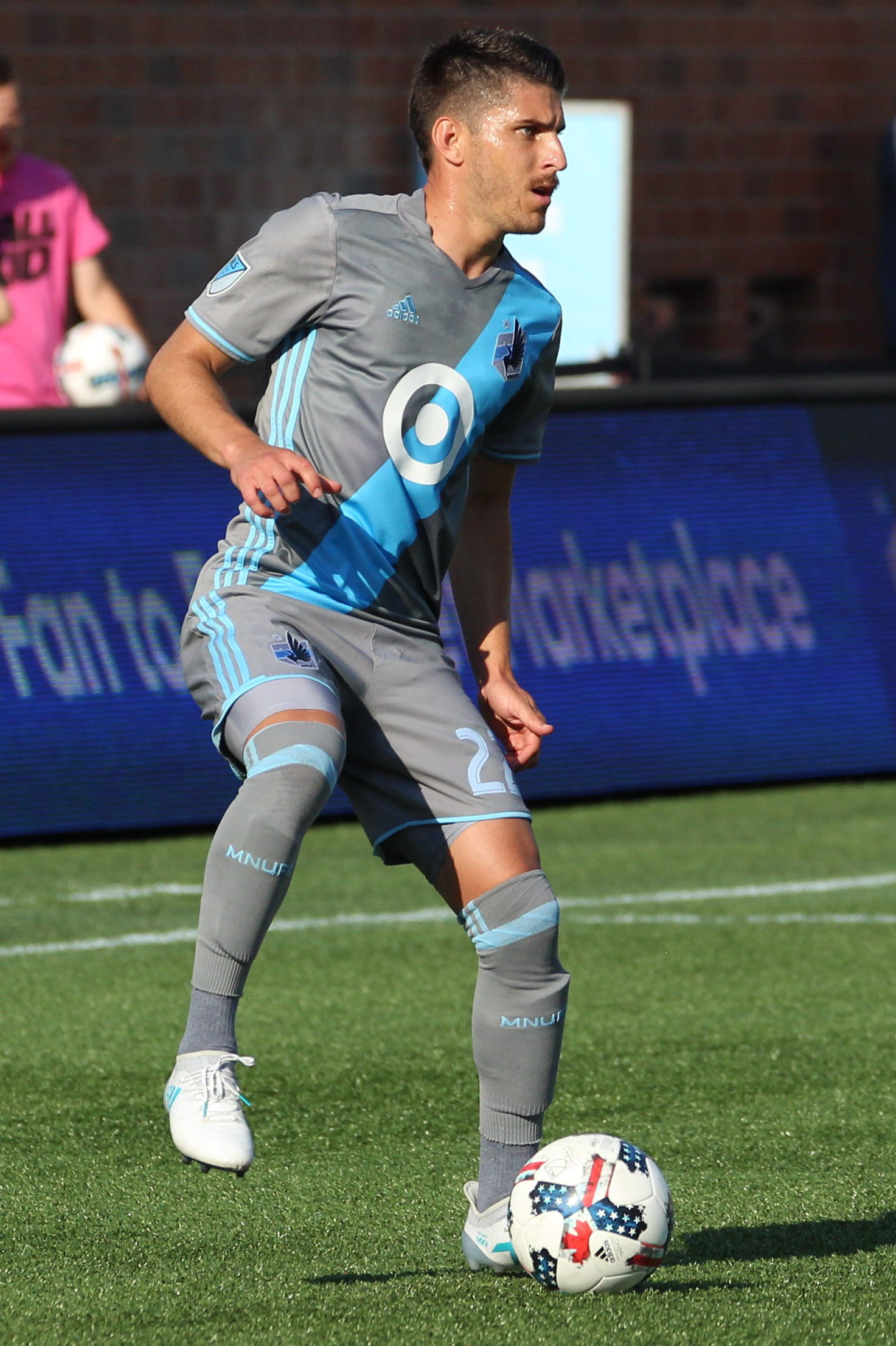
Venegas playing for Minnesota United FC in 2017

On January 17, 2012, Venegas was drafted in the second round (37th overall) of the 2012 MLS Supplemental Draft by Chivas USA. After failing to make the squad, Venegas joined Minnesota Stars FC of the North American Soccer League on April 3, 2012. Three weeks later, he made his debut in a 3–3 draw against the Atlanta Silverbacks. In 2012, he was named NASL Play Of The Year.

Venegas remained with Minnesota (now known as Minnesota United FC) as they moved up from NASL to Major League Soccer in 2017. He made six appearances for Minnesota that year, playing a full 90 minutes in each of them. After the season's conclusion, Minnesota dropped Venegas from their roster.

On January 25, 2018, United Soccer League side Indy Eleven announced that they had signed Venegas for the 2018 season. On June 14, Venegas scored his first goal and an assist for Indy Eleven in a 3–1 win over Toronto FC II. This performance earned him a spot on the USL Team of the Week for week 14.

On February 14, 2020, Detroit City FC announced they had signed Venegas for the 2020 season.

== Career statistics ==
As of October 20, 2018

Club	Season	League			Playoffs		Cup		Continental		Total	
Club	Season	Division	Apps	Goals	Apps	Goals	Apps	Goals	Apps	Goals	Apps	Goals
Orange County Blue Star	2010	USL PDL	14	4	–		–		–		14	4
Minnesota United (NASL)	2012	NASL	20	1	0	0	2	1	–		22	2
Minnesota United (NASL)	2013	NASL	16	0	–		0	0	–		16	0
Minnesota United (NASL)	2014	NASL	21	1	1	0	1	0	–		23	1
Minnesota United (NASL)	2015	NASL	28	2	1	0	0	0	–		29	2
Minnesota United (NASL)	2016	NASL	23	1	–		2	1	–		25	2
Minnesota United (NASL)	Total		108	5	2	0	5	2	0	0	115	7
Minnesota United	2017	MLS	6	0	–		1	0	–		7	0
Indy Eleven	2018	USL	21	1	1	0	0	0	–		22	1
Career total			149	10	3	0	6	2	0	0	158	12
