= Shawn-Claud Lawson =

Canadian-Jamaican footballer (born 1994)

Personal information
- Full name: Shawn-Claud Nicholas Lawson
- Date of birth: 13 January 1994 (age 32)
- Place of birth: Scarborough, Ontario, Canada
- Height: 1.75 m (5 ft 9 in)
- Position: Forward

Team information
- Current team: Simcoe County Rovers

Youth career
- 1998–2005: Ajax SC
- 2005: North Scarborough SC
- 2006–2007: Feyenoord
- 2007–2009: Pickering SC
- 2009–2012: Ajax SC

College career
Years	Team	Apps	(Gls)
2012–2015	Oakland Golden Grizzlies	78	(8)

Senior career*
Years	Team	Apps	(Gls)
2013–2014	Detroit City	12	(4)
2015	Des Moines Menace	8	(1)
2016	Michigan Stars	12	(2)
2017	Detroit City	14	(7)
2017	Durham United FA	4	(1)
2018	Detroit City	12	(6)
2018	Darby FC	3	(0)
2019–2020	Detroit City	17	(13)
2021	Atlético Ottawa	8	(0)
2022–	Simcoe County Rovers	80	(22)

International career^{‡}
2011	Jamaica U17	4	(0)
- * Club domestic league appearances and goals as of 29 August 2025 ‡ National team caps and goals as of 26 June 2021

Shawn-Claud Nicholas Lawson (born 13 January 1994) is a professional footballer who plays as a forward for Simcoe County Rovers in League1 Ontario. Born in Canada, he represented Jamaica at youth international level.

== Early life ==
Lawson was born in Scarborough, Ontario, the son of former Jamaican national team player Jimmy Lawson. As an infant, he had an open heart surgery after the doctors had discovered a leaking valve. Lawson started playing youth soccer at the age of three with Ajax SC. He briefly played for North Scarborough SC and also trained with Dutch club Feyenoord's academy in 2006 and 2007. He later played for Pickering FC, where he was invited to attend trainings with English clubs Luton Town and Birmingham FC after attending a soccer camp led by Canada national team player Paul Peschisolido. He was part of the U15 Ontario provincial program. Afterwards, he returned to Ajax SC helping lead them to the 2011 Canada national U-18 championship, in which he scored the game-winning goal.

== College career ==
In 2012, he began attending Oakland University, playing for the Oakland Golden Grizzlies on a scholarship, after having interest from Clemson, North Carolina, Bucknell, Harvard, Colgate, Michigan, and the University of Cincinnati. He scored 8 goals in 78 appearances and won back-to-back Horizon League titles in 2014 and 2015.

== Club career ==
In 2013, during the college off-season, he joined NPSL club Detroit City FC. He played 19 total matches between 2013 and 2014. He scored the 2014 NPSL Goal of the Year.

In 2015, he joined PDL club Des Moines Menace, scoring his first goal and collecting his first assist on June 26 against the Springfield Synergy FC.

In 2016, he played for NPSL club Michigan Stars FC.

For the 2017 season, he re-joined Detroit City, leading them in scoring in 2017 with nine goals across all compeititons, also winning the NPSA Northwest Region Championship in 2017.

After the NPSL season, he joined Durham United FA in League1 Ontario.

The next year, he again returned to Detroit City, where he led the team in scoring in 2018 once again with eight goals across all compeititions. He also had a training stint with USL club Ottawa Fury FC in 2018.

In late 2018, Lawson played for League1 Ontario side Darby FC, making three appearances in August and September of that year.

He returned to Detroit City in 2019. On July 7, he scored a hat trick in a 3–1 victory over AFC Ann Arbor. He scored another hat trick on August 6 in the club's annual cross-border exhibition against Canadian club Windsor TFC. In 2019, he set the club record with 19 goals in a single season, being named the DCFC Black Arrow Award winner as team MVP. With the club, he won the NISA Fall Tournament Championship. He departed the club after the 2020 season as the club's all-time leading scorer with 51 goals across all competitions.

On 29 April 2021, Lawson returned to Canada, signing with Canadian Premier League side Atlético Ottawa. After the season, Ottawa elected not to exercise its contract option on Lawson.

In February 2022, Lawson signed with Simcoe County Rovers of League1 Ontario. He scored six goals, appearing in all 21 of the team's regular season matches and two playoff appearances in 2022. After winning the league championship with the team in 2023, he re-signed for the 2024 season.

== International career ==
He first joined the Jamaica in 2010, later playing for them at the 2011 CONCACAF U-17 Championship, making two appearances in the group stage against Trinidad and Tobago and Guatemala, and a third appearance in the third-place match against the Panama. He was subsequently called up for the 2011 FIFA U-17 World Cup, where he made one appearance against Japan.
