= Tendai Jirira =

Zimbabwean footballer (born 1991)

Personal information
- Date of birth: 12 November 1991 (age 34)
- Place of birth: Zimbabwe
- Position: Defender

Senior career*
| Years | Team | Apps | (Gls) |
| 2017 | AFC Ann Arbor | | |
| 2018–2019 | Cincinnati Dutch Lions | 21 | (0) |
| 2019–2021 | Detroit City FC | | |
| 2024 | Foro SC | | |

International career
- Zimbabwe
- * Club domestic league appearances and goals

Tendai Jirira (born 12 November 1991) is a Zimbabwean footballer who is last known to have played as a defender for Foro SC.

== Early life ==
Jirira was raised by his grandmother after his mother moved to England for job opportunities, which enabled her to fund his schooling in Zimbabwe. He was born in 1991 in Marondera, Zimbabwe, and attended Beatrice Primary School, Prince Edward High School, and Nyazura Adventist High School.

== Youth career ==
As a youth player, Jirira joined the Friendly Academy in Zimbabwe.

== College career ==
Jirira did not play any senior club competitive football in Zimbabwe before moving to the United States on a football scholarship. He first "made a name for himself" after spending four years with the University of Northwestern Ohio Racers, helping them go deep in the NAIA national championship and win nineteen games during the 2016 season. He majored in business.

== Club career ==
During Jirira's college career, he trained a lot with an American lower league side, but the club was unable to sign him at the time due to college soccer rules. He started his senior club career with American side AFC Ann Arbor. In 2019, he signed for American side Detroit City FC. He helped the club win the league and 2020 NISA Independent Cup. He also won the Black Arrow Award. He last appeared in the 2024 U.S. Open Cup with UPSL club Foro SC.

== International career ==
Jirira has represented Zimbabwe at Under-14, Under-15, and Under-17 level. He was called up to the Zimbabwe national football team squad for the 2021 Africa Cup of Nations qualifiers. However, he was unable to play for Zimbabwe during those qualifiers due to flight problems.

== Style of play ==
Jirira mainly operates as a full back. He can also operate as a center back. He is known for his crossing ability and work rate.

== Philanthropy ==
Jirira has helped donate resources to several Zimbabwean orphanages with the support of Detroit City FC supporters.

== Personal life ==
Jirira has a sister.
