= Connor Rutz =

American soccer player (born 1997)

Personal information
- Date of birth: April 9, 1997 (age 29)
- Place of birth: Commerce Township, Michigan, United States
- Height: 1.85 m (6 ft 1 in)
- Position: Attacking midfielder

Team information
- Current team: Detroit City
- Number: 11

College career
Years	Team	Apps	(Gls)
2015–2016	Schoolcraft Ocelots	34	(13)
2017–2019	SVSU Cardinals	39	(17)

Senior career*
Years	Team	Apps	(Gls)
2018–2019	Cincinnati Dutch Lions	26	(3)
2020–	Detroit City	141	(18)
- * Club domestic league appearances and goals as of November 4, 2026

Connor Rutz (born April 9, 1997) is an American soccer player who plays for Detroit City in the USL Championship.

== Career ==
=== Early career ===
Rutz played soccer at Walled Lake Northern High School before attending Schoolcraft College in 2016. Rutz scored five goals in 19 appearances in his single season with the Ocelots, before transferring to Saginaw Valley State University in 2017. With the Cardinals, Rutz scored 17 goals and tallied eight assists in 39 appearances, missing the entire 2018 season. In 2017, he was named All-GLIAC First Team midfielder, earned United Soccer Coaches First Team and D2CCA All-Midwest Region Second Team honors. In his senior year, Rutz was earned GLIAC Offensive Player of the Year and All-GLIAC First-Team honors, D2CCA All-Midwest Region Second-Team honors, was named to the United Soccer Coaches All-Midwest Region First-Team, and the United Soccer Coaches All-America Second-Team.

In 2018 and 2019, Rutz also appeared for USL League Two side Cincinnati Dutch Lions, making 26 appearances and scoring three goals.

=== Detroit City ===
Rutz joined National Independent Soccer Association club Detroit City FC for their 2020 season, scoring two goals in seven games, helping the team to become the Great Lakes Region champions. He stayed with the club in 2021, where the team was Great Lakes Champions, regular season champions and won the Legends Cup. He continued with the team in 2022 as the club made the move to the USL Championship, helping the team make the playoffs in both the '22 and '23 seasons and being recognized as a "City Centurion", along with teammates Nate Steinwascher, Maxi Rodriguez, and captain Stephen Carroll. Ahead of the 2024 season, it was announced that Connor Rutz was resigning with DCFC.

== Honors ==
=== Team ===
National Independent Soccer Association

- Season Championship
  - Champions (2): 2020–21, 2021
- Fall Championship
  - Champions (1): 2020
- Legends Cup
  - Champions (1): 2021
- NISA Independent Cup
  - Great Lakes Region
    - Champions (2): 2020, 2021

=== Individual ===
National Independent Soccer Association

- NISA All-League first team: 2021
