= Pato Botello Faz =

Mexican footballer (born 1996)

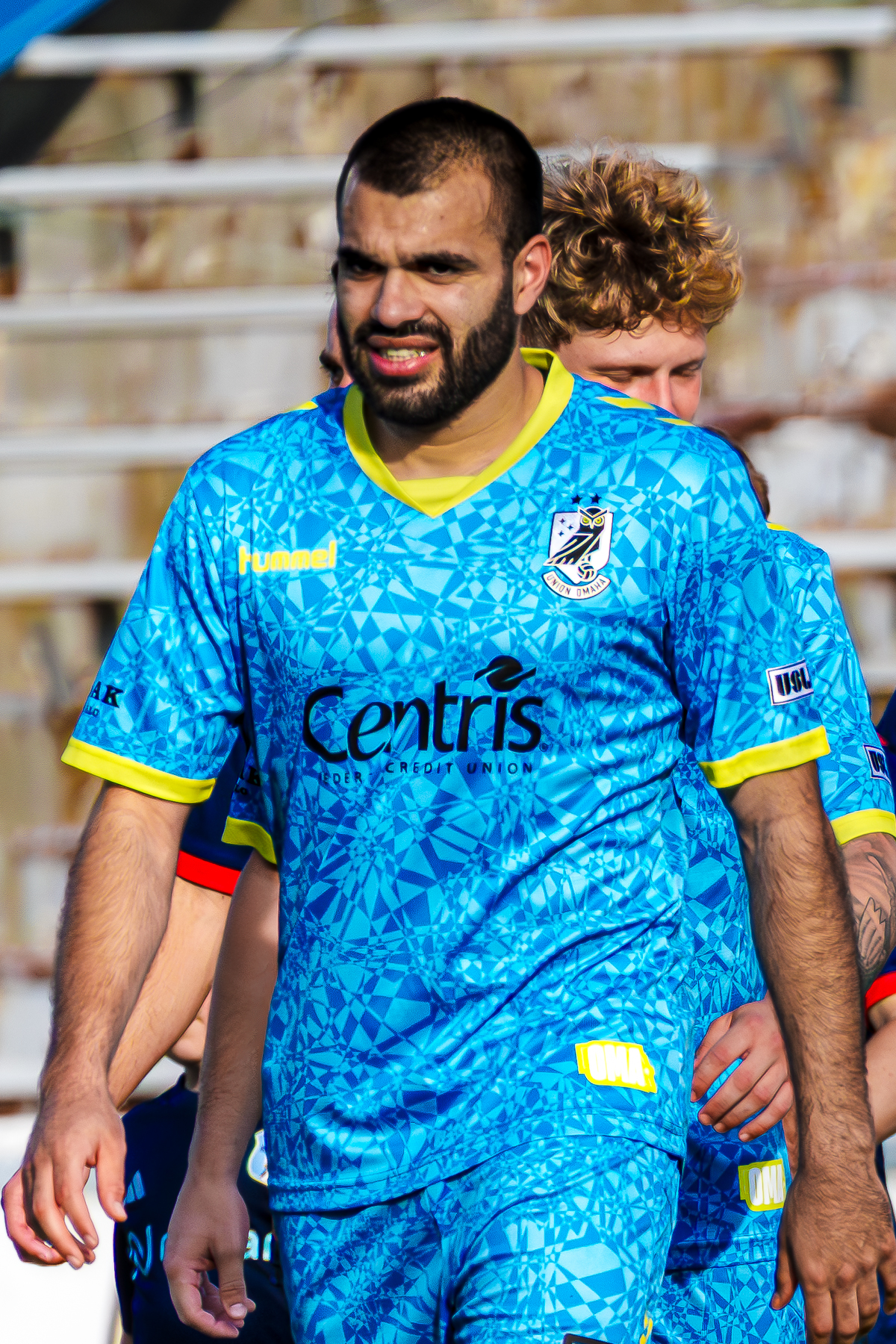
- Botello Faz with Union Omaha in 2026

Personal information
- Full name: Patricio Botello Faz
- Date of birth: 8 September 1996 (age 30)
- Place of birth: Monterrey, Nuevo León, Mexico
- Height: 1.83 m (6 ft 0 in)
- Position: Forward

Team information
- Current team: Union Omaha
- Number: 33

College career
Years	Team	Apps	(Gls)
2015–2018	St. Mary's Rattlers	65	(39)

Senior career*
Years	Team	Apps	(Gls)
2017	Texas United	12	(6)
2018	Corpus Christi FC	9	(8)
2019	Lansing Ignite	21	(7)
2020	South Georgia Tormenta	10	(0)
2021–2022	Detroit City	41	(13)
2023	Las Vegas Lights	18	(4)
2025–	Union Omaha	51	(7)
- * Club domestic league appearances and goals as of October 31, 2026

Patricio "Pato" Botello Faz (born 8 September 1996) is a Mexican professional footballer who plays as a forward who plays for USL League One side Union Omaha.

== Club career ==
Botello Faz started out with 2 pre-professional seasons with Texas United and Corpus Christi FC, both in USL League Two in the 2017 and 2018 seasons, respectively, of which the latter was an expansion side before signing his first pro contract with USL League One side Lansing Ignite. After Lansing folded after one season, Botello Faz signed with another League One side, South Georgia Tormenta FC for the 2020 USL League One season.

After playing with South Georgia for one season, Botello Faz joined then-NISA side Detroit City FC in mid-April and helped them win both the Legends Cup and the championship that year, also being the 2021 NISA Spring Golden Ball winner. After this, Botello Faz stayed with the team as it moved up to the second-tier League USL Championship for the 2022 USL Championship season, helping the team to make the playoffs.

After 2 seasons with DCFC, it was announced that Botello Faz had signed with fellow USL Championship side Las Vegas Lights FC for the 2023 USL Championship season, appearing in 18 games and scoring 4 goals for the club on their way to a horrific 3-21-10 (W-L-D) record and a bottom finish of the conference table.

On June 6, 2025, it was announced that USL League One side Union Omaha had signed Botello Faz to a 25-day contract.
