= Matt Lewis (soccer) =

American soccer player (born 1996)

Personal information
- Full name: Matthew Lewis
- Date of birth: August 1, 1996 (age 30)
- Place of birth: Kansas City, Missouri, United States
- Height: 1.88 m (6 ft 2 in)
- Position: Defender

Youth career
- 2013–2014: Sporting Kansas City

College career
Years	Team	Apps	(Gls)
2014–2017	Fordham Rams	84	(5)

Senior career*
Years	Team	Apps	(Gls)
2018	Sporting Kansas City	0	(0)
2018	→ Swope Park Rangers (loan)	4	(0)
2018	Swope Park Rangers	8	(0)
2019	New York Cosmos B	12	(0)
2019–2022	Kansas City Comets (indoor)	25	(10)
2020	New York Cosmos	8	(1)
2020	→ Detroit City (loan)	1	(1)
2021–2024	Detroit City	60	(3)
2021	→ El Paso Locomotive (loan)	0	(0)
- * Club domestic league appearances and goals as of March 11, 2024

Matthew Lewis (born August 1, 1996) is an American former soccer player.

== Career ==
=== Youth and college ===
Lewis played four years of college soccer at Fordham University between 2014 and 2017. During his time with the Rams, Lewis tallied five goals and five assists across 84 appearances.

=== Professional ===
On January 22, 2018, Lewis signed a homegrown player contract with MLS side Sporting Kansas City. He made his professional debut on March 17, 2018, for Sporting Kansas City's United Soccer League affiliate Swope Park Rangers, appearing as a 30th-minute substitute during a 4–3 win over Reno 1868.

On June 27, 2018, Lewis moved permanently from Sporting Kansas City to their USL affiliate Swope Park Rangers.

Lewis was released by Swope Park on December 3, 2018.

After playing with the New York Cosmos B in 2019, Lewis returned to Kansas City by signing with the Major Arena Soccer League's Kansas City Comets. In 2020, Lewis signed with the New York Cosmos first team and was immediately loaned to Detroit City FC.

On July 23, 2021, Lewis signed on a short-term loan with USL Championship side El Paso Locomotive and returned to Detroit City on August 1, 2021.

After three seasons with Detroit, Lewis announced his retirement from playing professional soccer on March 11, 2024.
