= Fall 2021 Chicago House AC season =

American soccer team season

Chicago House AC
2021 season
- Owner: Lindsey Morgan Sacks
- President: Peter Wilt
- Head coach: C. J. Brown
- Stadium: SeatGeek Stadium; Bridgeview, Illinois
- NISA: 6th
- Top goalscorer: Wojciech Wojcik (8)
- Highest home attendance: 1,183 (Aug. 21 vs. NAM)
- Lowest home attendance: 1,013 (Aug. 29 vs. DET)
- Average home league attendance: 1,098

The Fall 2021 Chicago House AC season was the club's first in the National Independent Soccer Association and first as a professional team.

== Roster ==
=== Players ===
As of August 20, 2021

No.	Pos.	Nation	Player
1	GK	PUR	Joel Serrano
2	DF	USA	John Requejo
3	MF	USA	Keegan Thompson
5	DF	USA	David Abidor
7	MF	USA	Michael Kozielek
8	MF	USA	Drew Conner
9	FW	POL	Wojciech Wojcik
10	FW	RSA	Nazeem Bartman
11	FW	NGA	Musa Morris
12	MF	GHA	Michael Kafari
14	FW	USA	AR Smith
17	MF	USA	Leonardo Acosta
18	GK	USA	Mike Novotny
21	MF	USA	Louis Bennett II
22	MF	USA	Matteo Kidd
23	FW	ENG	Jacob Bevan
24	DF	GER	Stefan Mijatovic
27	DF	USA	Anthony Bowie
30	DF	USA	Ian Cerro
32	DF	PUR	Rodolfo Sulia
33	GK	USA	Brandon Barnes
88	MF	KOR	Seo-In Kim
94	MF	USA	Damon Almazan
99	FW	USA	Derek Huffman

=== Staff ===
Technical staff
Technical Director and Head Coach	(United States) C. J. Brown

== Transfers ==
=== In ===
#	Pos.	Player	Signed from	Details	Date	Source
8	MF	(United States) Drew Conner	(United States) Indy Eleven	Free transfer	May 13, 2021	
3	MF	(United States) Keegan Thompson	(United States) Elmhurst Bluejays	Free transfer	May 14, 2021	
9	FW	(Poland) Wojciech Wojcik	(United States) Forward Madison FC	Free transfer	June 1, 2021	
94	MF	(United States) Damon Almazan	(United States) Steel City FC	Solidarity payment	June 4, 2021	
7	MF	(United States) Michael Kozielek	(Finland) Sporting Kristina	Free transfer	June 4, 2021	
5	DF	(United States) David Abidor	(United States) Oakland Roots SC	Free transfer	June 4, 2021	
18	GK	(United States) Mike Novotny	(United States) Hartford Athletic	Free transfer	June 4, 2021	
32	DF	(Puerto Rico) Rodolfo Sulia	(Puerto Rico) Metropolitan FA	Free transfer	July 10, 2021	
1	GK	(Puerto Rico) Joel Serrano	Unattached	Free transfer	July 10, 2021	
23	FW	(England) Jacob Bevan	(Spain) CD Marino	Free transfer	July 7, 2021	
17	MF	(United States) Leonardo Acosta	(United States) Chicago Mustangs (Indoor)	Free transfer	July 16, 2021	
22	MF	(United States) Matteo Kidd	(United States) Saint Louis Billikens	Free transfer	July 16, 2021	
12	MF	(Ghana) Michael Kafari	(United States) New Amsterdam FC	Free transfer	July 16, 2021	
24	DF	(Germany) Stefan Mijatovic	(United States) St. Louis Ambush (Indoor)	Free transfer	July 16, 2021	
33	GK	(United States) Brandon Barnes	(United States) Forward Madison FC	Free transfer	July 16, 2021	
10	FW	(South Africa) Nazeem Bartman	(United States) Des Moines Menace	Free transfer	July 30, 2021	
88	MF	(South Korea) Seo-In Kim	(United States) Oakland Roots SC	Free transfer	July 30, 2021	
14	FW	(United States) AR Smith	Unattached	Free transfer	July 30, 2021	
21	MF	(United States) Louis Bennett II	(United States) Forward Madison FC	Free transfer	August 2, 2021	
11	FW	(Nigeria) Musa Morris	(United States) Liberty Flames	Free transfer	August 2, 2021	
27	DF	(United States) Anthony Bowie	(United States) Flint City Bucks	Free transfer	August 13, 2021	
99	FW	(United States) Derek Huffman	Unattached	Free transfer	August 13, 2021	
2	DF	(United States) John Requejo	Unattached	Free transfer	August 20, 2021	
30	MF	(United States) Ian Cerro	(United States) FC Milwaukee Torrent	Free transfer	September 10, 2021	

== Friendlies ==
June 26 Friendly	South Bend Lions FC	P–P	Chicago House AC	South Bend, Indiana
5:00 p.m. EDT		Report		Stadium: TCU School Field
Note: Match cancelled due to inclement weather

July 3 Exhibition	Springfield FC (UPSL)	v	Chicago House AC	Springfield, Illinois
1:00 p.m. CDT		Report		Stadium: SASA Soccer Complex
Note: Result not published

July 17 Friendly	Steel City FC (MWPL)	0-2	Chicago House AC	Kankakee, Illinois
7:00 p.m. CDT		Report	Morris, Smith	Stadium: Kankakee High School

== Competitions ==
=== NISA Independent Cup ===
Details for the 2021 NISA Independent Cup were released on June 10.

==== Standings ====
Pos	Team	Pld	W	D	L	GF	GA	GD	Pts
1	FC Milwaukee Torrent (C)	3	3	0	0	11	1	+10	9
2	Chicago House AC	3	1	1	1	6	3	+3	4
3	Med City FC	3	1	1	1	4	6	−2	4
4	Union Dubuque FC	3	0	0	3	1	12	−11	0

Source: nisaofficial.com
Rules for classification: 1) points; 2) goal differential; 3) goals for; 4) head-to-head
(C) Champions

==== Matches ====
July 9 Match 1	FC Milwaukee Torrent	2–0	Chicago House AC	Wauwatosa, Wisconsin
7:00 p.m. CDT	Caballero (yellow card) 18'; Mennana 43', 90+2'	Report; Broadcast	Bennett II (yellow card) 17'; Mijatovic (yellow card) 38'; Acosta (yellow card) 90+1'	Stadium: Hart Park Stadium; Referee: Ryan Shanklin

July 24 Match 2	Med City FC	1–1	Chicago House AC	Rochester, Minnesota
6:45 p.m. CDT	Lange-Nielson 5'; Aro-Lambo (yellow card) 53'; Radilla (yellow card) 57'; Millward (yellow card) 90+6'	Report; Broadcast	Morris 54'; Conner (yellow card) 57'	Stadium: Rochester Regional Stadium

July 31 Match 3	Union Dubuque FC	0–5	Chicago House AC	Dubuque, Iowa
5:00 p.m. CDT		Broadcast	Huffman 8', 21', 28'; Bevan 54', 72'	Stadium: Dubuque Soccer Club
Note: Broadcast did not catch the first few minutes of match, commentary is used to gather goal times in first half

=== National Independent Soccer Association season ===
Details regarding the Fall season were released on June 16.

==== Standings ====
Pos	Team	Pld	W	D	L	GF	GA	GD	Pts
1	Detroit City FC (C)	18	14	3	1	35	10	+25	45 (Note: The November 13 match between the LA Force and Detroit City FC was cancelled due to several players testing positive for COVID-19. The match was declared a 0-0 draw.)
2	California United Strikers FC	18	9	6	3	31	20	+11	33
3	Los Angeles Force	18	7	9	2	20	14	+6	30
4	New Amsterdam FC	18	7	2	9	29	29	0	23
5	Chattanooga FC	18	7	2	9	20	21	−1	23
6	Chicago House AC	18	7	2	9	18	26	−8	23
7	Michigan Stars FC	18	5	6	7	24	24	0	21
8	Stumptown AC	18	4	8	6	13	18	−5	20
9	Maryland Bobcats FC	18	5	5	8	20	28	−8	20
10	San Diego 1904 FC	18	2	3	13	17	37	−20	9

Source: nisasoccer.com
Rules for classification: 1) points; 2) goal differential; 3) goals scored; 4) head-to-head
(C) Champions

==== Results summary ====
Overall								Home						Away					
Pld	W	D	L	GF	GA	GD	Pts	W	D	L	GF	GA	GD	W	D	L	GF	GA	GD
18	7	2	9	19	27	−8	23	4	1	4	10	16	−6	3	1	5	9	11	−2

Last updated: September 4, 2021.
Source: Match reports

==== Matches ====
August 7 1	Detroit City FC	3–2	Chicago House AC	Hamtramck, Michigan
7:30 p.m. EDT	Lewis 30'; Rodriguez 39' (Pen.); Carroll (yellow card) 78'; Manning 87'	Report; Broadcast	Wojcik 25'; Kim (yellow card) 37'; Conner 49' (Pen.), (yellow card) 89'	Stadium: Keyworth Stadium; Attendance: 6,076; Referee: Matt Geringer
Note: Kim's yellow card missing from report but shown on broadcast

August 14 2	Stumptown AC	0–1	Chicago House AC	Matthews, North Carolina
7:00 p.m. EDT	Stripling (yellow card) 17'; Hines (yellow card) 63'	Report; Broadcast	Sulia (yellow card) 38'; Kozielek (yellow card) 65'; Mijatovic (yellow card) 69'; Conner (yellow card) 87'; Wojcik 90'; Bowie (yellow card) 90+1'	Stadium: Sportsplex at Matthews; Attendance: 167; Referee: Kyle Johnston
Note: Report missing Chicago sub (Bennett II in for Mijatovic in 71'), shown on broadcast

August 21 3	Chicago House AC	0–4	New Amsterdam FC	Bridgeview, Illinois
7:45 p.m. CDT	Abidor (yellow card) 67'; Morris (yellow card) 72'	Report; Broadcast	Malango 16', 66'; Mikaheel (yellow card) 17'; Batiz 44'; Bermudez 74'	Stadium: SeatGeek Stadium; Attendance: 1,183; Referee: Nicole Green
Note: Report stats fourth goal was scored by Barone, replay and social media correct identify goal scorer as Bermudez

August 29 4	Chicago House AC	0–1	Detroit City FC	Bridgeview, Illinois
6:05 p.m. CDT	Conner (yellow card) 56'; Kafari (yellow card) 71'	Report; Broadcast	Filerman (yellow card) 60'; Rodriguez 65' (Pen.); Venegas (yellow card) 90'	Stadium: SeatGeek Stadium; Attendance: 1,013; Referee: Aleksandar Zhelyazkov
Note: Venegas' yellow missing from report, shown in broadcast.

September 4 5	Michigan Stars FC	0–0	Chicago House AC	Washington, Michigan
3:30 p.m. EDT	Chalbaud (yellow card) 27'; Frank (yellow card) 54'	Report; Broadcast	Bennett II (yellow card) 55'	Stadium: Romeo High School Stadium; Referee: Brandon Gardner
Note: Referee omitted from report, name said in broadcast prior to kickoff, Anthony Bowie erroneously listed twice in starting XI (making it 12 players)

September 12 6	California United Strikers FC	1-0	Chicago House AC	Irvine, California
4:00 p.m. PDT				Stadium: Championship Soccer Stadium

September 17 7	Los Angeles Force	1-0	Chicago House AC	Irvine, California
7:35 p.m. CDT				Stadium: Championship Soccer Stadium

September 24 8	Chicago House AC	1-1	Michigan Stars FC	Bridgeview, Illinois
7:35 p.m. CDT				Stadium: SeatGeek Stadium

October 2 9	San Diego 1904 FC	0-2	Chicago House AC	Pacific Highlands Ranch, San Diego
7:00 p.m. PDT				Stadium: Canyon Crest Stadium

October 9 10	Chicago House AC	1-0	San Diego 1904 FC	Bridgeview, Illinois
7:45 p.m. CDT				Stadium: SeatGeek Stadium

October 16 11	Maryland Bobcats FC	2-1	Chicago House AC	Germantown, Maryland
7:30 p.m. EDT				Stadium: Maryland SoccerPlex

October 20 12	Chicago House AC	1-0	Chattanooga FC	Bridgeview, Illinois
7:35 p.m. CDT				Stadium: SeatGeek Stadium

October 23 13	Chicago House AC	2-5	Maryland Bobcats FC	Bridgeview, Illinois
7:45 p.m. CDT				Stadium: SeatGeek Stadium

October 29 14	New Amsterdam FC	1-2	Chicago House AC	Hempstead, New York
7:00 p.m. EDT				Stadium: Hofstra Soccer Stadium

November 3 15	Chattanooga FC	2-0	Chicago House AC	Chattanooga, Tennessee
7:00 p.m. EDT				Stadium: Finley Stadium

November 6 16	Chicago House AC	2-1	Los Angeles Force	Bridgeview, Illinois
7:00 p.m. PDT				Stadium: SeatGeek Stadium

November 13 17	Chicago House AC	2-1	Stumptown AC	Bridgeview, Illinois
7:45 p.m. CST				Stadium: SeatGeek Stadium

November 20 18	Chicago House AC	1-3	California United Strikers FC	Bridgeview, Illinois
7:35 p.m. CST				Stadium: SeatGeek Stadium

== Squad statistics ==
As of Match played September 4, 2021

=== Appearances and goals ===
No.	Pos	Nat	Player	Total		Regular season	
No.	Pos	Nat	Player	Apps	Goals	Apps	Goals
Goalkeepers
1	GK	(Puerto Rico) PUR	Joel Serrano	1	0	0+1	0
18	GK	(United States) USA	Mike Novotny	17	0	17+0	0
33	GK	(United States) USA	Brandon Barnes	1	0	1+0	0
Defenders
2	DF	(United States) USA	John Requejo	8	0	6+2	0
5	DF	(United States) USA	David Abidor	13	0	11+2	0
24	DF	(Germany) GER	Stefan Mijatovic	3	0	3+0	0
27	DF	(United States) USA	Anthony Bowie	18	0	18+0	0
32	DF	(Puerto Rico) PUR	Rodolfo Sulia	18	1	18+0	1
Midfielders
3	MF	(United States) USA	Keegan Thompson	2	0	0+2	0
7	MF	(United States) USA	Michael Kozielek	12	0	11+1	0
8	MF	(United States) USA	Drew Conner	13	1	12+1	1
12	MF	(Ghana) GHA	Michael Kafari	14	0	9+5	0
17	MF	(United States) USA	Leonardo Acosta	8	1	3+5	1
21	MF	(United States) USA	Louis Bennett II	15	1	11+4	1
22	MF	(United States) USA	Matteo Kidd	18	0	13+5	0
30	MF	(United States) USA	Ian Cerro	12	3	11+1	3
88	MF	(South Korea) KOR	Seo-In Kim	3	0	3+0	0
94	MF	(United States) USA	Damon Almazan	3	0	0+3	0
Forwards
9	FW	(Poland) POL	Wojciech Wojcik	18	8	16+2	8
10	FW	(South Africa) RSA	Nazeem Bartman	8	1	5+3	1
11	FW	(Nigeria) NGA	Musa Morris	17	1	7+10	1
14	FW	(United States) USA	AR Smith	4	0	3+1	0
23	FW	(England) ENG	Jacob Bevan	2	0	0+2	0
99	FW	(United States) USA	Derek Huffman	17	1	14+3	1

=== Goal scorers ===
Place	Position	Nation	Number	Name	Regular season
1	FW	(Poland)	9	Wojciech Wojcik	2
2	MF	(United States)	8	Drew Conner	1

=== Disciplinary record ===
Number	Nation	Position	Name	Regular season	
Number	Nation	Position	Name	Booked	Sent off (straight red)
5	(United States)	DF	David Abidor	1	0
7	(United States)	MF	Michael Kozielek	1	0
8	(United States)	MF	Drew Conner	2	0
11	(Nigeria)	FW	Musa Morris	1	0
12	(Ghana)	MF	Michael Kafari	1	0
21	(United States)	MF	Louis Bennett II	1	0
24	(Germany)	DF	Stefan Mijatovic	1	0
27	(United States)	DF	Anthony Bowie	1	0
32	(Puerto Rico)	DF	Rodolfo Sulia	1	0
88	(South Korea)	MF	Seo-In Kim	1	0
