= Fall 2021 National Independent Soccer Association season =

National Independent Soccer Association
- Season: Fall 2021 season
- Dates: Aug. 7 – Nov. 21
- Champions: Detroit City FC
- Matches: 90
- Goals: 227 (2.52 per match)
- Top goalscorer: (Mexico) Omar Nuño (12)
- Biggest home win: NAM 4–0 1904 (November 21)
- Biggest away win: NAM 1–6 DET (September 29)
- Highest scoring: MIC 3–4 CAL (7 goals, August 7); NAM 1–6 DET (7 goals, September 29); CHI 2–5 MAR (7 goals, October 23)
- Longest winning run: 5 matches Detroit City FC (August 21 – September 15) (October 9 – November 6)
- Longest unbeaten run: 10 matches Detroit City FC (September 25 – November 20)
- Longest winless run: 16 matches San Diego 1904 FC (August 21 – November 21)
- Longest losing run: 6 matches San Diego 1904 FC (September 25 – October 23)
- Highest attendance: 6,076; DET 3–2 CHI (August 7)
- Lowest attendance: 164; STU 0–0 MIC (September 1)
- Total attendance: 29,641 (As of Sept. 4)
- Average attendance: 1,289
- All statistics correct as of November 21.

The Fall 2021 NISA season was the third season of the National Independent Soccer Association's third-division soccer competition. The season took place only during the Fall in order to realign the league's seasons with the calendar year. The league also organized the second edition of its pre-season cup competition, the NISA Independent Cup.

== Teams ==
The nine teams that participated in the 2020-21 Spring season all returned. They were joined by expansion club Chicago House AC.

=== Stadiums and locations ===
Locations of announced clubs
- Participating club

Team	Location	Stadium	Capacity
California United Strikers FC	Irvine, California	Championship Stadium	5,000
Chattanooga FC	Chattanooga, Tennessee	Finley Stadium	20,668
Chicago House AC	Bridgeview, Illinois	SeatGeek Stadium	20,000
Detroit City FC	Hamtramck, Michigan	Keyworth Stadium	7,933
Los Angeles Force	Whittier, California	Valley High School (Santa Ana, California)	
Maryland Bobcats FC	Boyds, Maryland	Maryland SoccerPlex	4,000
Michigan Stars FC	Pontiac, Michigan	Romeo High School	4,000
New Amsterdam FC	Hempstead, New York	Hofstra Soccer Stadium	1,600
San Diego 1904 FC	San Diego, California	Canyon Crest Stadium	
Stumptown AC	Matthews, North Carolina	Sportsplex at Matthews	5,000

=== Personnel and sponsorship ===
Note: The league has signed a deal with Hummel to be the official kit manufacturer, but it still allows clubs to find their own provider.

Team	Head coach	Captain(s)	Kit manufacturer	Shirt sponsor
California United Strikers FC	(United States) Don Ebert	(United States) Xavier Fuerte	(United States) Nike	Taco Bell
Chattanooga FC	(United States) Peter Fuller	(Spain) Juan Hernandez	(Denmark) Hummel	Louisiana Hot Sauce, VfL Wolfsburg
Chicago House AC	(United States) C.J. Brown	(United States) Drew Conner	(United States) Nike	—
Detroit City FC	(England) Trevor James	(Republic of Ireland) Stephen Carroll	(Germany) Adidas	Metro Detroit Chevy Dealers
Los Angeles Force	(Brazil) Thales Peterson	(United States) Joshua Culwell	(United States) Xara	—
Maryland Bobcats FC	(United States) Phil Nana	(United States) Kay Banjo	(Denmark) Hummel	Dog Haus
Michigan Stars FC	(Germany) Alexander Strehmel	(United States) Kyle Nuel	(Denmark) Hummel	HTC
New Amsterdam FC	(Senegal) Bouna Coundoul	(United States) Daniel Vicente	(United States) Icarus	Fruit Street
San Diego 1904 FC	(Scotland) Scott Morrison	(United States) Ozzie Ramos	(United States) Nike	Live Up Nutrition
Stumptown AC	(United States) Rod Underwood	(United States) Franky Martinez	(Denmark) Hummel	OrthoCarolina Healthcare

=== Managerial changes ===
Team	Outgoing manager	Manner of departure	Date of vacancy	Position in table	Incoming manager	Date of appointment
New Amsterdam FC	(Germany) Maximilian Mansfield	Stepping down	July 20	Preseason	(Senegal) Bouna Coundoul	July 20

== NISA Independent Cup ==
The NISA Independent Cup will start on July 9. It features seven of the ten NISA clubs, with Michigan Stars FC and Stumptown AC opting not to participate and San Diego 1904 FC withdrawing before the start of the tournament. They will be joined by 28 invited amateur teams and divided geographically into nine regions of four clubs each. Each region will play a single round robin tournament with the team earning the most points in each region declared regional champion. Like last year, there will be no interregional play or national champion.

=== Participating Clubs ===
Great Lakes
St	Team	League
(Ohio)	Cleveland SC	NPSL
(Michigan)	Detroit City FC	NISA
(New York (state))	FC Buffalo	NPSL
(Michigan)	Livonia City FC	MWPL

Mid-Atlantic
St	Team	League
(Pennsylvania)	Allentown United FC	UPSL
(New Jersey)	Atlantic City FC	NPSL
(Maryland)	Maryland Bobcats FC	NISA
(Maryland)	Steel Pulse FC	EPSL

Midwest
St	Team	League
(Illinois)	Chicago House AC	NISA
(Wisconsin)	FC Milwaukee Torrent	NPSL
(Minnesota)	Med City FC	NPSL
(Iowa)	Union Dubuque FC	MWPL

New England
St	Team	League
(New York (state))	Lansdowne Yonkers FC	EPSL
(Massachusetts)	Mass United Rush FC	UPSL
(New York (state))	New Amsterdam FC	NISA
(Connecticut)	Newtown Pride FC	Connecticut

Pacific
St	Team	League
(California)	Bay Cities FC	None
(California)	California Victory FC	UPSL
(Oregon)	PDX FC	USL2
(Washington (state))	Space United FC	Starfire Sports

South Central
St	Team	League
(Louisiana)	Alexandria PBFC	GCPL
(Texas)	Lone Star Republic	UPSL
(Louisiana)	Louisiana Krewe FC	GCPL
(Texas)	Texas Spurs FC	UPSL

Southeast
St	Team	League
(Georgia (U.S. state))	Atletico Atlanta	UPSL
(Tennessee)	Chattanooga FC	NISA
(Georgia (U.S. state))	Savannah Clovers FC	UPSL
(South Carolina)	Soda City FC	UPSL

Southwest
St	Team	League
(Arizona)	Atletico Olympians	UPSL
(California)	California United Strikers FC	NISA
(Arizona)	FC Arizona	NPSL
(California)	~~San Diego 1904 FC~~	~~NISA~~

West Coast
St	Team	League
(California)	ASC San Diego	NPSL
(California)	Chula Vista FC	SoCal Premier
(California)	Los Angeles Force	NISA
(California)	MAGIA Futbol Academy	SoCal Premier

=== Great Lakes Region ===
==== Standings ====
Pos	Team	Pld	W	D	L	GF	GA	GD	Pts
1	Detroit City FC (C)	3	3	0	0	17	2	+15	9
2	FC Buffalo	3	2	0	1	11	3	+8	6
3	Cleveland SC	3	0	1	2	3	13	−10	1
4	Livonia City FC	3	0	1	2	2	15	−13	1

Source: nisaofficial.com
Rules for classification: 1) points; 2) goal differential; 3) goals for; 4) head-to-head
(C) Champions

==== Results ====
Home \ Away	CLE	DET	FCB	LIV
Cleveland SC	—	1–4		
Detroit City FC		—	3–1	10–0
FC Buffalo	7–0		—	3–0
Livonia City FC	2–2			—

Source: nisasoccer.com
Legend: Blue = home team win; Yellow = draw; Red = away team win.

=== Mid-Atlantic Region ===
==== Standings ====
Pos	Team	Pld	W	D	L	GF	GA	GD	Pts
1	Maryland Bobcats FC (C)	3	2	1	0	2	0	+2	7
2	Steel Pulse FC	3	1	2	0	4	1	+3	5
3	Allentown United FC	3	1	0	2	2	5	−3	3
4	Atlantic City FC	3	0	1	2	2	4	−2	1

Source: nisaofficial.com
Rules for classification: 1) points; 2) goal differential; 3) goals for; 4) head-to-head
(C) Champions

==== Results ====
Home \ Away	ALL	ATL	MAR	STP
Allentown United FC	—	2–1		
Atlantic City FC		—	0–1	
Maryland Bobcats FC	1–0		—	0–0
Steel Pulse FC	3–0	1–1		—

Source: nisasoccer.com
Legend: Blue = home team win; Yellow = draw; Red = away team win.

=== Midwest Region ===
==== Standings ====
Pos	Team	Pld	W	D	L	GF	GA	GD	Pts
1	FC Milwaukee Torrent (C)	3	3	0	0	11	1	+10	9
2	Chicago House AC	3	1	1	1	6	3	+3	4
3	Med City FC	3	1	1	1	4	6	−2	4
4	Union Dubuque FC	3	0	0	3	1	12	−11	0

Source: nisaofficial.com
Rules for classification: 1) points; 2) goal differential; 3) goals for; 4) head-to-head
(C) Champions

==== Results ====
Home \ Away	CHI	FCM	MED	UDU
Chicago House AC	—			
FC Milwaukee Torrent	2–0	—	4–1	
Med City FC	1–1		—	2–1
Union Dubuque FC	0–5	0–5		—

Source: nisasoccer.com
Legend: Blue = home team win; Yellow = draw; Red = away team win.

=== New England Region ===
The match between New Amsterdam FC and Lansdowne Yonkers FC was originally scheduled for July 17 and was to be hosted at Hudson Sports Complex in Warwick, New York. However, weather forced the match to be postponed to a later date. The game was played on July 28 but was instead hosted by Lansdowne at Flemings Field in Yonkers, New York.

==== Standings ====
Pos	Team	Pld	W	D	L	GF	GA	GD	Pts
1	Lansdowne Yonkers FC (C)	3	3	0	0	8	2	+6	9
2	New Amsterdam FC	3	1	1	1	3	2	+1	4
3	Newtown Pride FC	3	0	2	1	4	5	−1	2
4	Mass United Rush FC	3	0	1	2	3	9	−6	1

Source: nisaofficial.com
Rules for classification: 1) points; 2) goal differential; 3) goals for; 4) head-to-head
(C) Champions

==== Results ====
Home \ Away	LAN	MUR	NAM	NTP
Lansdowne Yonkers FC	—	5–1	1–0	2–1
Mass United Rush FC		—		2–2
New Amsterdam FC		2–0	—	
Newtown Pride FC			0–0	—

Source: nisasoccer.com
Legend: Blue = home team win; Yellow = draw; Red = away team win.

=== Pacific Region ===
On July 22, the league announced that California Victory FC had withdrawn from the tournament after playing one match, a 1-1 draw against Bay Cities FC. This result was expunged.

==== Standings ====
Pos	Team	Pld	W	D	L	GF	GA	GD	Pts
1	PDX FC (C)	2	1	1	0	7	5	+2	4
2	Space United FC	2	0	2	0	4	4	0	2
3	Bay Cities FC	2	0	1	1	5	7	−2	1

Source: nisaofficial.com
Rules for classification: 1) points; 2) goal differential; 3) goals for; 4) head-to-head
(C) Champions

==== Results ====
Home \ Away	BAY	CAL	PDX	SPA
Bay Cities FC	—	~~1-1~~		2–2
California Victory FC		—		
PDX FC	5–3		—	
Space United FC			2–2	—

Source: nisasoccer.com
Legend: Blue = home team win; Yellow = draw; Red = away team win.

=== South Central Region ===
==== Standings ====
Pos	Team	Pld	W	D	L	GF	GA	GD	Pts
1	Louisiana Krewe FC (C)	3	2	1	0	2	0	+2	7
2	Lone Star Republic	3	1	1	1	4	4	0	4
3	Texas Spurs FC	3	0	3	0	3	3	0	3
4	Alexandria PBFC	3	0	1	2	2	4	−2	1

Source: nisaofficial.com
Rules for classification: 1) points; 2) goal differential; 3) goals for; 4) head-to-head
(C) Champions

==== Results ====
Home \ Away	APB	LSR	LAK	TXS
Alexandria PBFC	—			1–1
Lone Star Republic	2–1	—		2–2
Louisiana Krewe FC	1–0	1–0	—	
Texas Spurs FC			0–0	—

Source: nisasoccer.com
Legend: Blue = home team win; Yellow = draw; Red = away team win.

=== Southeast Region ===
==== Standings ====
Pos	Team	Pld	W	D	L	GF	GA	GD	Pts
1	Chattanooga FC (C)	3	3	0	0	10	0	+10	9
2	Atletico Atlanta	3	0	2	1	5	6	−1	2
3	Savannah Clovers FC	3	0	2	1	5	9	−4	2
4	Soda City FC	3	0	2	1	2	7	−5	2

Source: nisaofficial.com
Rules for classification: 1) points; 2) goal differential; 3) goals for; 4) head-to-head
(C) Champions

==== Results ====
Home \ Away	ATL	CHA	SAV	SOD
Atletico Atlanta	—		4–4	
Chattanooga FC	1–0	—		5–0
Savannah Clovers FC		0–4	—	1–1
Soda City FC	1–1			—

Source: nisasoccer.com
Legend: Blue = home team win; Yellow = draw; Red = away team win.

=== Southwest Region ===
The Southwest Region is the only region of the Independent Cup that does not consist of four clubs. On July 7, NISA announced on Twitter that 1904 FC had withdrawn from the tournament just 48 hours before the tournament was set to begin. Therefore, the Southwest Region would continue as a three team round-robin.

==== Standings ====
Pos	Team	Pld	W	D	L	GF	GA	GD	Pts
1	California United Strikers FC (C)	2	2	0	0	5	1	+4	6
2	Atletico Olympians	2	1	0	1	3	5	−2	3
3	FC Arizona	2	0	0	2	1	3	−2	0

Source: nisaofficial.com
Rules for classification: 1) points; 2) goal differential; 3) goals for; 4) head-to-head
(C) Champions

==== Results ====
Home \ Away	ATL	CAL	FCA
Atletico Olympians	—	1–4	2–1
California United Strikers FC		—	1–0
FC Arizona			—

Source: nisasoccer.com
Legend: Blue = home team win; Yellow = draw; Red = away team win.

=== West Coast Region ===
==== Standings ====
Pos	Team	Pld	W	D	L	GF	GA	GD	Pts
1	Los Angeles Force (C)	3	2	0	1	5	3	+2	6
2	MAGIA Futbol Academy	3	1	1	1	9	7	+2	4
3	ASC San Diego	3	1	1	1	6	8	−2	4
4	Chula Vista FC	3	0	2	1	7	9	−2	2

Source: nisaofficial.com
Rules for classification: 1) points; 2) goal differential; 3) goals for; 4) head-to-head
(C) Champions

==== Results ====
Home \ Away	ASC	CHU	LAF	MAG
ASC San Diego	—		1–0	1–4
Chula Vista FC	4–4	—		3–3
Los Angeles Force		2–0	—	
MAGIA Futbol Academy			2–3	—

Source: nisasoccer.com
Legend: Blue = home team win; Yellow = draw; Red = away team win.

== Regular season ==
The Fall season started on August 6, and saw the ten teams play each other twice, in a single-table format. There were no playoffs; the team leading the table at the end of the season was declared champion. The season ended on November 21.

=== Standings ===
Pos	Team	Pld	W	D	L	GF	GA	GD	Pts
1	Detroit City FC (C)	18	14	3	1	35	10	+25	45 (Note: The November 13 match between the LA Force and Detroit City FC was cancelled due to several players testing positive for COVID-19. The match was declared a 0-0 draw.)
2	California United Strikers FC	18	9	6	3	31	20	+11	33
3	Los Angeles Force	18	7	9	2	20	14	+6	30
4	New Amsterdam FC	18	7	2	9	29	29	0	23
5	Chattanooga FC	18	7	2	9	20	21	−1	23
6	Chicago House AC	18	7	2	9	18	26	−8	23
7	Michigan Stars FC	18	5	6	7	24	24	0	21
8	Stumptown AC	18	4	8	6	13	18	−5	20
9	Maryland Bobcats FC	18	5	5	8	20	28	−8	20
10	San Diego 1904 FC	18	2	3	13	17	37	−20	9

Source: nisasoccer.com
Rules for classification: 1) points; 2) goal differential; 3) goals scored; 4) head-to-head
(C) Champions

=== Results ===
Home \ Away	CAL	CHA	CHI	DET	LAF	MAR	MIC	NAM	SDG	STU
California United Strikers FC	—	1–1	1–0	1–1	1–1	1–0	0–2	4–1	3–1	1–1
Chattanooga FC	0–2	—	2–0	1–2	0–1	3–0	1–0	1–0	1–1	3–1
Chicago House AC	1–3	1–0	—	0–1	2–1	2–5	1–1	0–4	1–0	2–1
Detroit City FC	1–0	2–0	3–2	—	1–0	0–0	1–0	2–1	3–0	0–1
Los Angeles Force	1–1	3–1	1–0	0–0	—	0–0	1–1	0–0	2–1	2–2
Maryland Bobcats FC	1–1	1–0	2–1	0–4	1–2	—	0–1	1–2	3–1	1–1
Michigan Stars FC	3–4	3–1	0–0	2–3	1–2	2–2	—	1–4	4–2	0–0
New Amsterdam FC	1–4	2–1	1–2	1–6	1–1	4–0	0–2	—	4–0	1–2
San Diego 1904 FC	1–2	1–2	0–2	1–2	1–2	3–2	2–1	1–2	—	0–0
Stumptown AC	2–1	0–1	0–1	0–3	0–0	0–1	0–0	1–0	1–1	—

Source: nisasoccer.com
Legend: Blue = home team win; Yellow = draw; Red = away team win.

=== Player statistics ===
As of November 21, 2021

==== Top goalscorers ====
Rank	Player	Club	Goals
1	(Mexico) Omar Nuño	California United Strikers	12
2	(Malawi) Mayele Malango	New Amsterdam	9
3	(Poland) Wojciech Wojcik	Chicago House	8
4	(United States) Maxi Rodriquez	Detroit City	7
5	(United States) Olakunle Banjo	Maryland Bobcats	6
5	(United States) Christian Chaney	Los Angeles Force	6
5	(Liberia) Molley Karpeh Jr.	Maryland Bobcats	6
8	(Grenada) Shavon John-Brown	New Amsterdam	5
8	(United States) Leon Maric	Michigan Stars	5
8	(United States) Kyle Nuel	Michigan Stars	5
8	(United States) Connor Rutz	Detroit City	5

==== Top assists ====
Rank	Player	Club	Assists
1	(United States) Derek Huffman	Chattanooga FC	4
1	(United States) Steven Juncaj	Michigan Stars	4
1	(United States) James Kasak	Chattanooga FC	4
4	(United States) Drew Conner	Chicago House	3
4	(Grenada) Shavon John-Brown	New Amsterdam	3
4	(United States) Felipe Liborio, Jr.	California United Strikers	3
4	(United States) Bryan Medina	California United Strikers	3
4	(Togo) Pilawe Patrick Pato	Maryland Bobcats	3
4	(United States) Christian Thierjung	California United Strikers	3
4	(United States) Kevin Venegas	Detroit City	3
4	(United States) Rhys Williams	Stumptown AC	3

==== Clean sheets ====
Rank	Player	Club	Clean sheets
1	(United States) Nathan Steinwascher	Detroit City	9
2	(Zimbabwe) Tatenda Mkuruva	Michigan Stars	6
2	(United States) Kevin Gonzalez	Stumptown AC	6
4	(United States) Alec Redington	Chattanooga FC	5
5	(United States) Brandon Gomez	Los Angeles Force	4
5	(United States) Mike Novotny	Chicago House	4
7	(Colombia) Kevin Tenjo	New Amsterdam	3
8	(Sierra Leone) Christian Caulker	Maryland Bobcats	2
8	(Nigeria) Joel Isyaq	Maryland Bobcats	2
10	(Haiti) Jean Gamain Antoine	California United Strikers	1
10	(United States) Brandon Barnes	Chicago House	1
10	(United States) Kifikalani Cabrera	Los Angeles Force	1
10	(United States) Alfredo Cortez	1904 FC	1
10	(United States) Mitch North	California United Strikers	1
10	(Jamaica) Sheldon Parkinson	New Amsterdam	1

==== Hat-tricks ====
Player	Club	Against	Result	Date
(Mexico) Omar Nuño	California United Strikers	at Michigan Stars	3–4	Aug 7
(United States) Olakunle Banjo	Maryland Bobcats	at Chicago House	2–5	Oct 23

=== Attendance ===
Games without fans reported are not counted in averages or games played.

Rank	Team	GP	Cumulative	High	Low	Mean
1	Detroit City FC	9	38,716	6,076	3,689	4,302
2	Chattanooga FC	9	19,580	2,916	1,420	2,176
3	Michigan Stars FC	7	14,105	3,786	506	2,015
4	Chicago House AC	9	9,448	1,420	663	1,050
5	California United Strikers FC	8	6,284	1,738	345	786
6	New Amsterdam FC	9	3,464	574	278	385
7	Maryland Bobcats FC	9	2,725	372	212	303
8	Stumptown AC	9	2,486	399	164	276
9	San Diego 1904 FC	9	2,391	393	168	266
10	Los Angeles Force	1	175	175	175	175
Total		79	99,374	6,076	164	1,258

== League awards ==
=== All-league teams ===
First team
Goalkeeper	Defenders	Midfielders	Forwards
(United States) Nathan Steinwascher (DET)	(Republic of Ireland) Stephen Carroll (DET) (United States) Nick Spielman (CHT) (United States) Devon Amoo-Mensah (MIC)	(United States) Maxi Rodriguez (DET) (United States) Steven Juncaj (MIC) (United States) Diego Barrera (LAF) (United States) Connor Rutz (DET)	(Mexico) Omar Nuño (CAL) (Malawi) Mayele Malango (NAM) (Poland) Wojciech Wojcik (CHI)

Second team
Goalkeeper	Defenders	Midfielders	Forwards
(United States) Kevin Gonzalez (STU)	(United States) Ian Cerro (CHI) (United States) Garrett Hogbin (CAL) (United States) Matt Lewis (DET)	(United States) Jimmy Filerman (DET) (United States) Edward Benito (SDG) (Sierra Leone) Mohamed Sesay (MAR) (United States) Felipe Liborio, Jr. (CAL)	(Grenada) Shavon John-Brown (NAM) (United States) Olakunle Banjo (MAR) (United States) Christian Chaney (LAF)

== See also ==
- National Independent Soccer Association
