= 2020–21 New Amsterdam FC season =

American soccer club season

New Amsterdam FC
2020–21 NISA season
- Owner: Laurence Girard
- Sporting director: Maximilian Mansfield
- Head coach: Eric Wynalda (until Aug. 17); Maximilian Mansfield (since Aug. 17)
- Stadium: Hudson Sports Complex; Warwick, New York
- NISA: Fall, Eastern Conf.: 5th Spring: 9th
- Playoffs: Fall: Group stage Spring: Did not qualify
- Legends Cup: 9th place
- U.S. Open Cup: Did not qualify
- Top goalscorer: League: Shavon John-Brown: 2 All: Michael Bello: 3
- Biggest win: 1904 1–4 NAFC (June 16)
- Biggest defeat: DCFC 3–0 NAFC (Sept. 5); NAFC 0–3 MSFC (Sept. 12); CFC 3–0 NAFC (Sept. 16); OAK 3–0 NAFC (Sep. 21, Fall Playoffs); NAFC 0–3 CFC (Apr. 16, Legends Cup)
Home colors	Away colors	Third colors

The 2020–21 New Amsterdam FC season was the club's first professional season and its first in the National Independent Soccer Association.

== Roster ==
=== Players ===
As of April 13, 2021

No.	Position	Nation	Player
1	GK	USA	Aldo Munoz
3	DF	USA	Armando Guarnera
5	MF	USA	Martins Williams
6	MF	USA	Fernando Cortez
7	FW	MNE	Bljedi Bardic
9	FW	COL	José Angulo
10	FW	USA	Cordt Flätgen
11	DF	USA	Daniel Vicente (captain)
12	MF	NGA	Yusuf Mikaheel
13	FW	RSA	Arthur Bosua
14	DF	JAM	Akeil Barrett
15	DF	GAM	Kalley Muntaha
16	DF	JAM	Sikele Sylvester
19	FW	COD	Mayele Malango
21	DF	COL	David Diosa
22	MF	USA	Salvatore Barone
23	DF	USA	Owen Azrak
24	DF	JAM	Javaun Waugh
26	GK	CIV	Mahamed Keita
27	DF	GHA	Michael Kafari
28	DF	USA	Michael Nastu
30	FW	GRN	Shavon John-Brown
31	FW	USA	James Baculima
31	GK	USA	Kevin Tenjo
33	DF	BFA	Mohamed Kone
36	MF	USA	Marlon Preciado
42	MF	USA	Atcha Yaya
72	MF	USA	Christopher Bermudez
90	GK	USA	Jesse Corke
—	MF	USA	Juliano Pereira

=== Staff ===
As of August 17, 2020

Position	Nation	Staff
Head coach	United States	Maximilian Mansfield

== Friendlies ==
July 16, 2020 Scrimmage	Clifton Elite FC (EPSL)	1–0	New Amsterdam FC	Clifton, New Jersey
9:15 p.m. EDT		Report		Stadium: Athenia Steel Recreation Complex

July 18, 2020 Scrimmage	Santa Fe NY (UPSL)	3–6	New Amsterdam FC	New York City, New York
7:00 p.m. EDT		Broadcast		Stadium: Randells Island

July 23, 2020 Scrimmage	New York Contour United (UPSL)	1–2	New Amsterdam FC	Seaford, New York
6:30 p.m. EDT		Broadcast		Stadium: Cedar Creek Park

July 25, 2020 Scrimmage	Lansdowne Yonkers FC	3–2	New Amsterdam FC	Yonkers, New York
7:00 p.m. EDT		Report		Stadium: Tibbetts Brook Park

September 13, 2020 Friendly	Hoboken FC 1912 (CSL)	2–3	New Amsterdam FC	Secaucus, New Jersey
12:00 p.m. EDT		Report		Stadium: Laurel Hill Park

March 11, 2021 Preseason	Lansdowne Yonkers FC	0–1	New Amsterdam FC	Yonkers, New York
8:00 p.m. EST		First Half Broadcast; Second Half Broadcast	Malango 85'	Stadium: Tibbetts Brook Park

March 13, 2021 Preseason	Allentown United FC (UPSL)	1–1	New Amsterdam FC	Conshohocken, Pennsylvania
6:45 p.m. EST		Report		Stadium: The Proving Grounds

March 19, 2021 Preseason	New York Red Bulls	P–P	New Amsterdam FC	Hanover, New Jersey
2:00 p.m. EDT				Stadium: New York Red Bulls Training Facility
Note: Cancelled due to the COVID-19 pandemic

March 26, 2021 Scrimmage	Monroe College Mustangs	v	New Amsterdam FC	New Rochelle, New York
10:00 a.m. EDT		Report		Stadium: Flowers Park Soccer Field
Note: Results not published

March 31, 2021 Preseason	New York Contour United (UPSL)	2–1	New Amsterdam FC	Hicksville, New York
8:00 p.m. EDT		Report		Stadium: Cantiague Park

April 3, 2021 Preseason	West Chester United SC	2–2	New Amsterdam FC	West Chester, Pennsylvania
6:00 p.m. EDT		Report; Match Broadcast		Stadium: WCUSC Turf Field

== Competitions ==
=== NISA Independent Cup ===
New Amsterdam was announced as one of the four NISA teams taking part in the inaugural NISA Independent Cup on July 1. The regional tournament acted as both a pre-season and chance to "provide a platform for professional and amateur independent clubs to play together on a national stage."

Amsterdam was drawn into the Mid-Atlantic Region alongside fellow NISA expansion side New York Cosmos, Fall 2019 UPSL champion Maryland Bobcats FC, and NPSL side FC Baltimore Christos.

On July 24, NISA announced that the Mid-Atlantic Region tournament was postponed due to a surge of COVID-19 cases in Maryland and the subsequent closing of the Maryland SoccerPlex to professional sports. On July 28, NISA announced a majority of the region's games would be played at Evergreen Sportsplex in Leesburg, Virginia with the sole exception being New Amsterdam's opening match against the Cosmos on August 2, which was played at Hudson Sports Complex in Warwick, New York.

==== Standings ====
Pos	Team	Pld	W	D	L	GF	GA	GD	Pts
1	Maryland Bobcats FC (C)	3	1	2	0	9	3	+6	5
2	FC Baltimore Christos	3	1	2	0	6	3	+3	5
3	New York Cosmos	3	0	3	0	4	4	0	3
4	New Amsterdam FC	3	0	1	2	2	11	−9	1

Source: nisaofficial.com
Rules for classification: 1) points; 2) head to head; 3) goal differential.
(C) Champions

==== Matches ====
August 2, 2020 Match 1	New York Cosmos	1–1	New Amsterdam FC	Warwick, New York
6:45 p.m.	Agolli 27', (yellow card) 45+5'; Cella (yellow card) 44'; Falanga (yellow card) 61'	Report; Broadcast	Afif (yellow card) 25'; Vicente (yellow card) 58'; Esche (yellow card) 73'; Bello 90+1', (yellow card) 90+1'	Stadium: Hudson Sports Complex; Attendance: 0
Note: Game was played behind closed doors due to the COVID-19 pandemic

August 6, 2020 Match 2	New Amsterdam FC	P–P	Maryland Bobcats FC	Leesburg, Virginia
6:45 p.m.				Stadium: Evergreen Sportsplex; Attendance: 0
Note: Called off due to weather

August 9, 2020 Match 3	FC Baltimore Christos	3–0	New Amsterdam FC	Leesburg, Virginia
7:45 p.m.	Lee 11', 45+4'; Sanderson 60'	Report		Stadium: Evergreen Sportsplex; Attendance: 0
Note: Game was played behind closed doors due to the COVID-19 pandemic

August 23, 2020 Match 2 (Replay)	New Amsterdam FC	1–7	Maryland Bobcats FC	Wayne, Pennsylvania
2:00 p.m.	McKenzie 5'	Report	Onwuka 35'; Joe 47'; Banjo 61', 70' (pen.); Pato 64'; Torres 66', 76'	Stadium: YSC Sports Complex; Attendance: 0
Note: Game was played behind closed doors due to the COVID-19 pandemic

=== NISA Fall Season ===
On June 4, NISA announced details for the 2020 Fall Season. The eight member teams would be split into conferences, Eastern and Western, with New Amsterdam playing in the former.

The Fall regular season schedule was announced on July 31, 2020.

==== Standings ====
Pos	Team	Pld	W	D	L	GF	GA	GD	Pts
1	Chattanooga FC	4	3	0	1	8	3	+5	9
2	Michigan Stars FC	4	2	2	0	6	2	+4	8
3	New York Cosmos	4	1	2	1	5	4	+1	5
4	Detroit City FC	4	1	2	1	3	2	+1	5
5	New Amsterdam FC	4	0	0	4	1	12	−11	0

Source: NISAofficial.com

==== Results summary ====
Overall								Home						Away					
Pld	W	D	L	GF	GA	GD	Pts	W	D	L	GF	GA	GD	W	D	L	GF	GA	GD
4	0	0	4	1	12	−11	0	0	0	2	1	6	−5	0	0	2	0	6	−6

Last updated: September 16, 2020.
Source: Match reports

==== Matches ====
August 21, 2020 Week 1	New Amsterdam FC	1–3	New York Cosmos	Warwick, New York
6:00 p.m. EDT	Vicente 15' (pen.); Nastu (yellow card) 32'; Esche (yellow card) 41'; Nadaner (yellow card) 82'	NISA Report; FotMob Report; Broadcast	Agolli (yellow card) 30'; Lewis 45+1'; Bardic 47'; Sembroni (red card) 56'; Hassan (yellow card) 80' (goal) 87'; Szetela (yellow card) 90+3'	Stadium: Hudson Sports Complex; Attendance: 0
Note: Game was played behind closed doors due to the COVID-19 pandemic

August 29, 2020 Week 2	Chattanooga FC	P–P	New Amsterdam FC	Chattanooga, Tennessee
7:30 p.m. EDT		Report		Stadium: Finley Stadium
Note: Match was postponed to protest racial injustice after the Shooting of Jacob Blake.

September 5, 2020 Week 3	Detroit City FC	3–0	New Amsterdam FC	Hamtramck, Michigan
6:30 p.m. EDT	Rutz 7', 53'; Lawson 11'; Venegas (yellow card) 29'; Rice (red card) 72'	NISA Report; FotMob Report; Broadcast	Keita (yellow card) 22' (yellow-red card) 41'; Bedoya (yellow card) 59'; O. Williams (red card) 82'	Stadium: Keyworth Stadium; Attendance: 0
Note: Game was played behind closed doors due to the COVID-19 pandemic

September 12, 2020 Week 4	New Amsterdam FC	0–3	Michigan Stars FC	Warwick, New York
6:00 p.m. EDT	Esche (yellow card) 45+1'; Bedoya (yellow card) 49'; Vicente (yellow card) 70'; Alvarez (yellow card) 89'	NISA Report; FotMob Report; Broadcast	Ben-Tal 6', (yellow card) 6'; S. Juncaj (penalty missed) 27', (yellow card) 81'; Nuel 45+4'; Juncaj (yellow card) 81'; Sullivan (yellow card) 90'; Bernedo 90+4'	Stadium: Hudson Sports Complex; Attendance: 0
Note: Game was played behind closed doors due to the COVID-19 pandemic

September 16, 2020 Week 2 (Replay)	Chattanooga FC	3–0	New Amsterdam FC	Chattanooga, Tennessee
7:30 p.m. EDT	Ferraz 10', 59'; Koloko (yellow card) 54'; Hoffstatter 73'; Adams (yellow card) 86'	NISA Report; FotMob Report; Broadcast	Keita (yellow card) 15'; Vicente (yellow card) 67'; Bedoya (yellow card) 90+3'	Stadium: Finley Stadium; Attendance: 517
Note: Match make-up due to the Shooting of Jacob Blake.

=== Fall Playoffs ===
All eight NISA teams qualified for the 2020 Fall tournament, which will be hosted at Keyworth Stadium in Detroit, Michigan, beginning on September 21 ending with the final on October 2.

==== Group stage ====
Pos	Team	Pld	W	D	L	GF	GA	GD	Pts	Qualification
1	Oakland Roots SC	3	2	0	1	5	2	+3	6	Advance to semifinals
2	Detroit City FC	3	2	0	1	6	5	+1	6	Advance to semifinals
3	Michigan Stars FC	3	1	1	1	4	3	+1	4	
4	New Amsterdam FC	3	0	1	2	4	9	−5	1	

Source: NISAofficial.com
Rules for classification: 1) Points, 2) Goal differential, 3) Goals scored, 4) Head-to-head record, 5) Coin toss

September 21, 2020 Group stage	Oakland Roots SC	3–0	New Amsterdam FC	Hamtramck, Michigan
8:00 p.m. EDT	Fondy 32'; Blanco (yellow card) 52', (goal) 76'; Casillas (yellow card) 55'; McInerney 65'	NISA Report; FotMob Report; Broadcast	Yorston (yellow card) 45+2'; Bello (yellow card) 45+2'; Vicente (yellow card) 67'; Nadaner (yellow card) 69'	Stadium: Keyworth Stadium; Attendance: 0 Referee: Samuel Pizzimenti
Note: Game was played behind closed doors due to the COVID-19 pandemic

September 24, 2020 Group stage	Michigan Stars FC	2–2	New Amsterdam FC	Hamtramck, Michigan
8:00 p.m. EDT	Satrústegui (yellow card) 21' (yellow-red card) 23'; Ben-Tal 45'; Tazifor (red card) 53'; S. Juncaj (yellow card) 90+6'	NISA Report; FotMob Report; Broadcast	Vicente 35', (yellow card) 45+1'; Williams (yellow card) 37'; Bello 63'; Bartley (yellow card) 75'; Nastu (yellow card) 90+4'	Stadium: Keyworth Stadium; Attendance: 0 Referee: Kevin Fikar
Note: Game was played behind closed doors due to the COVID-19 pandemic

September 27, 2020 Group stage	Detroit City FC	4–2	New Amsterdam FC	Hamtramck, Michigan
8:00 p.m. EDT	Venegas 9'; Kafari 13'; Lawson 70', 76'	NISA Report; FotMob Report; Broadcast	Bello 73', 84'; Nadaner (yellow card) 91'	Stadium: Keyworth Stadium; Attendance: 0 Referee: Joshua Abts
Note: Game was played behind closed doors due to the COVID-19 pandemic

=== NISA Spring Season ===
==== NISA Legends Cup ====
NISA announced initial season plans in early February 2021, including starting the season with a tournament in Chattanooga, Tennessee with a standard regular season to follow. The tournament, now called the NISA Legends Cup, was officially announced on March 10 and is scheduled to run between April 13 and 25. All nine NISA members teams take part in the Spring will be divided into three team groups. The highest placing group winner would automatically qualify for the tournament final, while the second and third highest group winners would play one-another in a semifinal to determine a second finalist.

New Amsterdam were drawn into Group 3 alongside Los Angeles Force and Chattanooga FC.

===== Standings =====
Pos	Team	Pld	W	D	L	GF	GA	GD	Pts	Qualification
1	Chattanooga FC	2	2	0	0	7	1	+6	6	Advance to Legends Cup final
2	Detroit City FC	2	1	1	0	2	0	+2	4	Advance to Legends Cup semifinal
3	San Diego 1904 FC	2	1	1	0	3	2	+1	4	Advance to Legends Cup semifinal
4	Los Angeles Force	2	1	0	1	4	6	−2	3	
5	Michigan Stars FC	2	0	2	0	2	2	0	2	
6	California United Strikers FC	2	0	2	0	1	1	0	2	
7	Maryland Bobcats FC	2	0	1	1	2	3	−1	1	
8	Stumptown AC	2	0	1	1	1	3	−2	1	
9	New Amsterdam FC	2	0	0	2	2	6	−4	0	

Source: nisasoccer.com
Rules for classification: 1) points; 2) goal differential; 3) goals scored; 4) head to head; 5) goals allowed; 6) coin toss

===== Group 1 results =====
Home \ Away	CHA	LAF	NAM
Chattanooga FC	—	4–1	3–0
Los Angeles Force		—	3–2
New Amsterdam FC			—

Source: nisasoccer.com
Legend: Blue = home team win; Yellow = draw; Red = away team win.

===== Matches =====
April 16, 2021 Group 3 Round 1	New Amsterdam FC	0–3	Chattanooga FC	Chattanooga, Tennessee
8:00 p.m. EDT	Malango (yellow card) 70'; Kone (yellow card) 80'; Sylvester (yellow card) 89'	NISA Report; CFC Report	McGrath 29', 75'; Bement (yellow card) 77'; Jones 90+6'	Stadium: Finley Stadium; Attendance: 2,249

April 19, 2021 Group 3 Round 2	New Amsterdam FC	2–3	Los Angeles Force	Chattanooga, Tennessee
12:00 p.m. EDT	Villatoro 14' (o.g.); Bardic 54', (yellow card) 83'	Report; Broadcast	Klemm 37'; Barrera (yellow card) 42'; Alewine (yellow card) 45+1'; Hoffman 70', 77'; Villatoro (yellow card) 82'	Stadium: Finley Stadium; Referee: Andrew Musashe

April 22, 2021	#8 Stumptown AC	1–0	#9 New Amsterdam FC	Chattanooga, Tennessee
11:00 a.m. EDT	McGrath (yellow card) 14'; Kurtz 49'; Hines (yellow card) 81'	Report		Stadium: Finley Stadium; Referee: Rashawn Clark

==== Regular season ====
The Spring Season schedule was announced on March 18 with each association member playing eight games, four home and four away, in a single round-robin format.

===== Standings =====
Pos	Team	Pld	W	D	L	GF	GA	GD	Pts	Qualification
1	Detroit City FC (Y, X)	8	6	2	0	14	3	+11	20	Advance to season final
2	Los Angeles Force	8	6	0	2	11	6	+5	18	Advance to spring final (Note: If either 2020 Fall Champion Detroit or 2021 Legends Cup runner-up Chattanooga finish the spring season in first place, or both teams finish in the top two, the spot in the spring final will go to the next best team.)
3	Stumptown AC	8	4	3	1	8	4	+4	15	
4	California United Strikers FC	8	4	1	3	12	10	+2	13	
5	Maryland Bobcats FC	8	3	2	3	9	8	+1	11	
6	Chattanooga FC (Z)	8	2	2	4	6	8	−2	8	Advance to spring final
7	San Diego 1904 FC	8	2	1	5	8	17	−9	7	
8	Michigan Stars FC	8	1	2	5	5	12	−7	5	
9	New Amsterdam FC	8	1	1	6	5	10	−5	4	

Source: nisasoccer.com
Rules for classification: 1) points; 2) goal differential; 3) goals scored; 4) head to head; 5) goals allowed; 6) coin toss
(X) Spring Legends Cup champion; (Y) Fall Champion, qualifies for season final; (Z) Spring Legends Cup runner-up, qualifies for spring final

===== Results summary =====
Overall								Home						Away					
Pld	W	D	L	GF	GA	GD	Pts	W	D	L	GF	GA	GD	W	D	L	GF	GA	GD
8	1	1	6	5	10	−5	4	0	1	3	1	4	−3	1	0	3	4	6	−2

Last updated: June 19, 2021.
Source: Match reports

===== Matches =====
May 1, 2021 Week 1	Michigan Stars FC	1–0	New Amsterdam FC	Washington, Michigan
7:00 p.m. EDT	S. Juncaj 50'; Mkuruva (yellow card) 90+5'	Report; Broadcast		Stadium: Romeo High School Stadium
Note: Missed subs from report: MSFC = Majano in for Abraham (46'), Chalbaud in for Lobsiger (71'), Lee in for Satrústegui (83'), Elgin in for Reynolds (86')/NAFC = Malango in for Vicente (58'), Preciado in for Mikaheel (75'). Mkuruva card not shown on report but seen in broadcast.

May 7, 2021 Week 2	New Amsterdam FC	0–1	Detroit City FC	Warwick, New York
7:00 p.m. EDT	Vicente (yellow card) 49'; Kafari (yellow card) 65'	Report; Broadcast	Todd 15'; Filerman (yellow card) 20'	Stadium: Hudson Sports Complex; Referee: Ernie Constantine
Note: Report missing Preciado's sub in the 81st for Malango and Kafari's yellow in the 65th

May 14, 2021 Week 3	New Amsterdam FC	0–1	Stumptown AC	Warwick, New York
7:00 p.m. EDT	Kafari (yellow card) 29'; Barone (yellow card) 59'; Guarnera (yellow card) 90'	Report; Broadcast	McGrath 53'; Bejarno Navia (yellow card) 87'	Stadium: Hudson Sports Complex; Referee: Luis Diego Arroyo
Note: Kafari's yellow missing from the report but shown on broadcast

June 2, 2021 Week 4	New Amsterdam FC	1–2	California United Strikers FC	Warwick, New York
2:00 p.m. EDT	Vicente (yellow card) 7'; Angulo 37'; Guarnera (yellow card) 55'; Kone (yellow card) 90'	Report; Broadcast	de la Fuente (yellow card) 7'; Nuño 17' (pen.); Lopez 63'	Stadium: Hudson Sports Complex; Referee: José Martín Arana
Note: Match report missing Vicente's yellow in the 7th minute for disention

June 5, 2021 Week 5	Chattanooga FC	2–0	New Amsterdam FC	Chattanooga, Tennessee
7:30 p.m. EDT	McGrath 44', (yellow card) 52'; Kasak (yellow card) 45+4'; Oliveira (yellow card) 69'; Hoffstatter 73'; Marcano (yellow card) 90+2'; Coleman (yellow card) 90+3'	Report; Broadcast	Diosa (red card) 40'; Kafari (yellow card) 56'; Vicente (yellow card) 63'	Stadium: Finley Stadium; Attendance: 2,718; Referee: Jervis Atagana
Note: Yellow card in 90+2' minute incorrectly attributed to Kyle Carr on report

June 11, 2021 Week 6	New Amsterdam FC	0–0	Maryland Bobcats FC	Warwick, New York
4:00 p.m. EDT	Malango (yellow card) 44'; John-Brown (yellow card) 68'	Report; Broadcast	Brown (yellow card) 54'; Gray (yellow card) 62'; Sesay (yellow card) 84'; Argueta (yellow card) 90+6'	Stadium: Hudson Sports Complex; Referee: José Martín Arana
Note: Maryland's Andy Alvarado may have been carded in the 84/85th minute for a dangerous challenge but it cannot be confirmed

June 16, 2021 Week 7	San Diego 1904 FC	1–4	New Amsterdam FC	Chula Vista, California
7:00 p.m. PDT	Espinoza (yellow card) 24'; Hone-Blanchet 57'; Ramos (yellow card) 73'; Cutler (yellow card) 79'	Report; Broadcast	John-Brown 7', 11'; Mikaheel (yellow card) 14'; Barone 45+1'; Bermudez 77'	Stadium: Chula Vista Elite Athlete Training Center; Referee: Jervis Atagana

June 19, 2021 Week 8	Los Angeles Force	2–0	New Amsterdam FC	Costa Mesa, California
7:00 p.m. PDT	Gordillo 45'; Barrera (yellow card) 52'; Villon (yellow card) 55'	Report; Broadcast	Guarnera 43' (o.g.); Diosa (yellow card) 49'	Stadium: Vanguard University Soccer Complex
Note: Guarnera's own goal is not shown on the report but is shown on stream. Match called off in the 66th minute due to poor lighting at the venue. According to NISA rules, the score at the time of the match stoppage is final.

=== U.S. Open Cup ===
As a team playing in a recognized professional league, New Amsterdam would normally be automatically qualified for the U.S. Open Cup. However, with the 2021 edition shorted due to the COVID-19 pandemic, NISA has only been allotted 1 to 2 teams spots. On March 29, U.S. Soccer announced 2020 Fall Champion Detroit City FC as NISA's representative in the tournament.

== Squad statistics ==
As of Match played June 19, 2021

=== Appearances and goals ===
No.	Pos	Nat	Player	Total		Fall Season		Fall Playoffs		Legends Cup		Spring Season	
No.	Pos	Nat	Player	Apps	Goals	Apps	Goals	Apps	Goals	Apps	Goals	Apps	Goals
Goalkeepers
1	GK	(United States) USA	Aldo Munoz	7	0	4+0	0	1+1	0	1+0	0	0+0	0
26	GK	(Ivory Coast) CIV	Mahamed Keita	3	0	0+0	0	2+0	0	0+0	0	0+1	0
31	GK	(United States) USA	Kevin Tenjo	5	0	-	-	-	-	0+0	0	5+0	0
90	GK	(United States) USA	Jesse Corke	5	0	-	-	-	-	2+0	0	3+0	0
Defenders
3	DF	(United States) USA	Armando Guarnera	9	0	0+0	0	0+0	0	2+1	0	6+0	0
11	DF	(United States) USA	Daniel Vicente	14	1	4+0	0	3+0	1	0+0	0	6+1	0
14	DF	(Jamaica) JAM	Akeil Barrett	3	0	-	-	-	-	0+3	0	0+0	0
15	DF	(The Gambia) GAM	Kalley Muntaha	0	0	-	-	-	-	0+0	0	0+0	0
16	DF	(Jamaica) JAM	Sikele Sylvester	5	0	-	-	-	-	2+0	0	1+2	0
21	DF	(Colombia) COL	David Diosa	4	0	-	-	-	-	0+0	0	4+0	0
23	DF	(United States) USA	Owen Azrak	5	0	-	-	-	-	0+0	0	5+0	0
27	DF	(Ghana) GHA	Michael Kafari	10	0	-	-	-	-	3+0	0	6+1	0
28	DF	(United States) USA	Michael Nastu	7	0	3+1	0	2+0	0	0+0	0	1+0	0
33	DF	(Burkina Faso) BFA	Mohamed Kone	10	0	-	-	-	-	3+0	0	7+0	0
45	DF	(Jamaica) JAM	Javaun Waugh	3	0	-	-	-	-	2+1	0	0+0	0
Midfielders
5	MF	(United States) USA	Martins Williams	14	0	1+2	0	3+0	0	1+1	0	0+6	0
6	MF	(United States) USA	Fernando Cortez	9	0	0+0	0	0+0	0	2+0	0	5+2	0
12	MF	(Nigeria) NGA	Yusuf Mikaheel	14	0	3+1	0	0+1	0	3+0	0	4+2	0
22	MF	(United States) USA	Salvatore Barone	9	1	-	-	-	-	2+0	0	6+1	1
26	MF	(United States) USA	Mohamed Maroc	0	0	-	-	-	-	0+0	0	0+0	0
36	MF	(United States) USA	Marlon Preciado	3	0	-	-	-	-	0+0	0	0+3	0
42	MF	(United States) USA	Atcha Yaya	0	0	-	-	-	-	0+0	0	0+0	0
72	MF	(United States) USA	Christopher Bermudez	-3	-1	-	-	-	-	-	-	4+1	1
	MF	(United States) USA	Juliano Pereira	0	0	-	-	-	-	0+0	0	0+0	0
Forwards
7	FW	(Montenegro) MNE	Bljedi Bardic	9	1	-	-	-	-	3+0	1	4+2	0
9	FW	(Colombia) COL	José Angulo	10	1	-	-	-	-	3+0	0	5+2	1
10	FW	(United States) USA	Cordt Flätgen	10	0	3+1	0	3+0	0	0+2	0	1+0	0
13	FW	(South Africa) RSA	Arthur Bosua	0	0	-	-	-	-	-	-	3+3	0
19	FW	(Democratic Republic of the Congo) COD	Mayele Malango	11	0	-	-	-	-	1+2	0	6+2	0
30	FW	(Grenada) GRN	Shavon John-Brown	9	2	-	-	-	-	3+0	0	5+1	2
31	FW	(United States) USA	James Baculima	2	0	0+1	0	0+0	0	0+1	0	0+0	0
Left during season
1	GK	(United States) USA	Laurence Girard	1	0	1+0	0	0+0	0	-	-	-	-
2	DF	(United States) USA	Saad Afif	3	0	1+0	0	1+1	0	-	-	-	-
3	DF	(United States) USA	Jesus Alvarez	5	0	2+0	0	3+0	0	-	-	-	-
6	MF	(United States) USA	Christian Camacho	0	0	0+0	0	0+0	0	-	-	-	-
8	MF	(United States) USA	Evin Nadaner	7	0	4+0	0	3+0	0	-	-	-	-
9	FW	(England) ENG	Tom Yorston	6	0	0+3	0	3+0	0	-	-	-	-
13	FW	(United States) USA	Sekou Fofana	0	0	0+0	0	0+0	0	-	-	-	-
17	FW	(Ivory Coast) CIV	Mahmoud Keita	6	0	3+0	0	2+1	0	-	-	-	-
19	MF	(Trinidad and Tobago) TRI	Naeem Charles	1	0	1+0	0	0+0	0	-	-	-	-
19	DF	(United States) USA	Bryan Dia	1	0	0+1	0	0+0	0	-	-	-	-
21	MF	(Colombia) COL	Daniel Bedoya	7	0	3+1	0	3+0	0	-	-	-	-
22	DF	(England) ENG	Carlton McKenzie	6	0	3+1	0	1+1	0	-	-	-	-
25	FW	(Germany) GER	Tobias Esche	5	0	3+0	0	2+0	0	-	-	-	-
80	MF	(Jamaica) JAM	Zaire Bartley	6	0	3+1	0	0+2	0	-	-	-	-
99	FW	(England) ENG	Michael Bello	6	3	3+0	0	1+2	3	-	-	-	-

=== Goal scorers ===
Place	Position	Nation	Number	Name	Fall Season	Fall Playoffs	Legends Cup	Spring Season	Total
1	FW	(England)	99	Michael Bello	0	3	-	-	3
2	FW	(United States)	11	Daniel Vicente	1	1	0	0	2
2	FW	(Grenada)	30	Shavon John-Brown	-	-	0	2	2
3	FW	(Montenegro)	7	Bljedi Bardic	-	-	1	0	1
3	FW	(Colombia)	9	José Angulo	-	-	1	0	1
3	MF	(United States)	22	Salvatore Barone	-	-	0	1	1
3	MF	(United States)	72	Christopher Bermudez	-	-	-	1	1
3				Own goal	0	0	1	0	1

=== Disciplinary record ===
Number	Nation	Position	Name	Fall Season		Fall Playoff		Legends Cup		Spring Season		Total	
Number	Nation	Position	Name	Booked	Sent off (straight red)	Booked	Sent off (straight red)	Booked	Sent off (straight red)	Booked	Sent off (straight red)	Booked	Sent off (straight red)
3	(United States)	DF	Jesus Alvarez	1	0	0	0	-	-	-	-	1	0
3	(United States)	DF	Armando Guarnera	-	-	-	-	0	0	2	0	2	0
5	(United States)	MF	Martins Williams	0	1	1	0	0	0	0	0	1	1
7	(Montenegro)	FW	Bljedi Bardic	-	-	-	-	1	0	0	0	1	0
8	(United States)	MF	Evin Nadaner	1	0	2	0	-	-	-	-	3	0
9	(England)	FW	Tom Yorston	0	0	1	0	-	-	-	-	1	0
11	(United States)	FW	Daniel Vicente	2	0	2	0	0	0	3	0	7	0
12	(Nigeria)	MF	Yusuf Mikaheel	0	0	0	0	0	0	1	0	1	0
16	(Jamaica)	DF	Sikele Sylvester	-	-	-	-	1	0	0	0	1	0
17	(Ivory Coast)	FW	Mahmoud Keita	2	1	0	0	-	-	-	-	2	1
19	(Democratic Republic of the Congo)	FW	Mayele Malango	-	-	-	-	1	0	1	0	2	0
21	(Colombia)	MF	Daniel Bedoya	3	0	0	0	-	-	-	-	3	0
21	(Colombia)	DF	David Diosa	-	-	-	-	0	0	1	1	1	1
22	(United States)	MF	Salvatore Barone	-	-	-	-	0	0	1	0	1	0
25	(Germany)	FW	Tobias Esche	2	0	0	0	-	-	-	-	2	0
27	(Ghana)	DF	Michael Kafari	-	-	-	-	0	0	3	0	3	0
28	(United States)	DF	Michael Nastu	1	0	1	0	-	-	-	-	2	0
30	(Grenada)	FW	Shavon John-Brown	-	-	-	-	0	0	1	0	1	0
33	(Burkina Faso)	DF	Mohamed Kone	-	-	-	-	1	0	1	0	2	0
80	(Jamaica)	MF	Zaire Bartley	0	0	1	0	-	-	-	-	1	0
99	(England)	FW	Michael Bello	0	0	1	0	-	-	-	-	1	0
