= 2019 Tampa Bay Rowdies season =

Tampa Bay Rowdies
2019 season
- Chairman: Stuart Sternberg
- Head coach: Neill Collins
- Stadium: Al Lang Stadium
- USL Championship: 5th (Eastern Conference)
- USL Cup: Quarterfinals
- U.S. Open Cup: Third round
- Top goalscorer: League: Guenzatti (18); All: Guenzatti (19)
- Highest home attendance: League/All: 7,851 (October 12 vs. Indy)
- Lowest home attendance: League: 4,022 (August 31 vs. Nashville, USLC); All: 1,342 (May 14 vs. The Villages, USOC)
- Average home league attendance: 5,497
- Biggest win: 6–1 (21 September vs. Bethlehem, USLC)
- Biggest defeat: 2–4 (14 August @ North Carolina, USLC)
Home colors	Away colors	Third colors

The 2019 Tampa Bay Rowdies season was the club's tenth season of existence, their third in the United Soccer League, and first in the newly named USL Championship. Including the previous Tampa Bay Rowdies, this was the 26th season of a franchise in the Tampa Bay metro area with the Rowdies moniker. Including the now-defunct Tampa Bay Mutiny, this was the 32nd season of professional soccer in the Tampa Bay region.

== Club ==
=== Roster ===
As of June 26, 2019

No.	Position	Nation	Player
1	GK	USA	John McCarthy
3	DF	USA	Ryan Felix
4	DF	USA	Tarek Morad
5	DF	AFG	David Najem
7	MF	FRA	Yann Ekra
8	MF	USA	Zach Steinberger
11	MF	BRA	Leo Fernandes
13	FW	URU	Sebastián Guenzatti
14	FW	CAN	Malik Johnson
15	MF	USA	Andrew Tinari
17	FW	PAN	Juan Tejada
18	MF	GHA	Dominic Oduro
19	DF	PUR	Shawn Barry
20	DF	ENG	Caleb Richards (on loan from Norwich City)
21	GK	USA	Macklin Robinson
22	MF	IRL	Jordan Doherty (on loan from Sheffield United)
23	FW	USA	Leon Taylor
26	MF	ALB	Afrim Taku
32	FW	JOR	Jaime Siaj
33	GK	USA	Chris Konopka
42	DF	BFA	Mohamed Kone
44	DF	SEN	Papé Diakité
77	FW	ZIM	Lucky Mkosana
88	FW	GHA	Kwadwo Poku

=== Technical staff ===
- (Scotland) Neill Collins – head coach
- (United States) Cheyne Roberts – assistant coach
- (Northern Ireland) Martin Paterson – assistant coach
- (England) Stuart Dobson – goalkeeper coach
- (United States) Pete Calabrese – performance coach
- (United States) Bentley Smith – kit man

=== Medical staff ===
- (United States) Andrew Keane – head athletic trainer
- (United States) Michelle Leget – assistant athletic trainer
- (United States) Dr. Mohit Bansal – team physician and orthopedic surgeon
- (United States) Dr. Vania Reyes – team physician, sports medicine

=== Front office ===
- (United States) Stuart Sternberg – owner
- (United States) Lee Cohen – vice president and chief operating officer
- (United States) Matthew Silverman – vice chairmen
- (United States) Brian Auld – vice chairmen

== Competitions ==
=== Exhibitions ===
The Rowdies hosted Major League Soccer teams in the Suncoast Invitational for the fourth year in a row.

February 2, 2019 Preseason	Tampa Bay Rowdies	1–0	Birmingham Legion FC	St. Petersburg, FL
	Allen	Report		Stadium: Al Lang Stadium; Attendance: Closed-door

February 9, 2019 Preseason	Tampa Bay Rowdies	4–2	UCF Knights	St. Petersburg, FL
	Oduro; Poku; Tejada trialist	Report		Stadium: Al Lang Stadium; Attendance: Closed-door

February 13, 2019 Preseason	Orlando City B	1–2	Tampa Bay Rowdies	Montverde, FL
		Report	Steinberger; Ekra	Stadium: Montverde Academy; Attendance: Closed-door

February 16, 2019 Suncoast Invitational	Tampa Bay Rowdies	0–1	D.C. United	St. Petersburg, FL
19:30 EST (UTC−5)	Diakité (yellow card) 47'	Report	Acosta (yellow card) 3'; Arriola 34' (Acosta)	Stadium: Al Lang Stadium

February 20, 2019 Suncoast Invitational	Tampa Bay Rowdies	0–0	Montreal Impact	St. Petersburg, FL
19:00 EST (UTC−5)		Report	Jackson-Hamel (yellow card) 23'	Stadium: Al Lang Stadium

February 23, 2019 Preseason	Tormenta FC	3–2	Tampa Bay Rowdies	Statesboro, GA
17:00 EST (UTC−5)	Micaletto 15'; Phelps (yellow card) 19'; Morrell 23', 56'; Dennis (yellow card) 49'		Fernandes 26'; Hoppenot 80'	Stadium: Erk Russell Park

February 24, 2019 Preseason	Georgia Southern Eagles	0–4	Tampa Bay Rowdies	Statesboro, GA
7:00 EST (UTC−5)			Wintermeier; Allen, Tejada	Stadium: Erk Russell Park

March 2, 2019 Preseason	USF Bulls	1–2	Tampa Bay Rowdies	Tampa, FL
19:00 EST (UTC−5)	10'	Report	Guenzatti 16'; Poku 85'	Stadium: Corbett Soccer Stadium

March 17, 2019 Midseason	Tampa Bay Rowdies	–	Stetson Hatters	St. Petersburg, FL
EST (UTC−5)				Stadium: Al Lang Stadium
Note: No result published.

April 14, 2019 Midseason	Tampa Bay Rowdies	5–1	Sarasota Metropolis FC	St. Petersburg, FL
10:30 EST (UTC−5)	Taylor,, Allen; Poku		Moriarty (pen.)	Stadium: Al Lang Stadium

=== USL Championship ===
==== Standings ====
Pos	Team	Pld	W	D	L	GF	GA	GD	Pts	Qualification
3	Indy Eleven	34	19	6	9	48	29	+19	63	Conference Quarterfinals
4	Louisville City FC	34	17	9	8	58	41	+17	60	Conference Quarterfinals
5	Tampa Bay Rowdies	34	16	10	8	61	33	+28	58	Conference Quarterfinals
6	New York Red Bulls II	34	17	6	11	74	51	+23	57	Conference Quarterfinals
7	North Carolina FC	34	16	8	10	57	37	+20	56	Play-In Round

Source: USL Championship Standings
Rules for classification: 1) total wins; 2) total goal differential; 3) total goals scored; 4) points earned against top four Conference finishers; 5) disciplinary points; 6) coin toss or drawing of lots

==== Results summary ====
Overall								Home						Away					
Pld	W	D	L	GF	GA	GD	Pts	W	D	L	GF	GA	GD	W	D	L	GF	GA	GD
34	16	10	8	61	33	+28	58	8	6	3	33	14	+19	8	4	5	28	19	+9

Last updated: 27 April 2019.
Source: Match reports

==== Results by round ====
Round	1	2	3	4	5	6	7	8	9	10	11	12	13	14	15	16	17	18	19	20	21	22	23	24	25	26	27	28	29	30	31	32	33	34
Stadium	A	H	A	H	H	H	A	H	A	A	H	H	A	H	H	A	H	A	A	H	A	A	H	A	H	H	A	H	A	H	A	A	H	A
Result	W	W	D	D	W	D	W	D	D	W	W	W	W	L	D	W	W	W	D	W	L	W	L	L	W	L	W	D	L	W	D	L	D	L
Position	6	2	1	2	2	4	1	3	3	2	1	1	1	1	1	1	1	1	1	1	1	1	2	3	2	3	2	3	4	3	4	5	4	5

Updated to match(es) played on 9 March 2019. Source: Match reports
A = Away; H = Home; W = Win; D = Draw; L = Loss

==== Results ====
March 9, 2019 1	Memphis 901 FC	0–1	Tampa Bay Rowdies	Memphis, TN
19:00 EST (UTC−5)	Metzger (yellow card) 58'; Sandoval (yellow card) 87'; Najem (yellow card) 90+1'	Report	Guenzatti 4' (pen.); Richards (yellow card) 11'	Stadium: AutoZone Park; Attendance: 8,062; Referee: Mike Lavergne

March 16, 2019 2	Tampa Bay Rowdies	2–0	Pittsburgh Riverhounds	St. Petersburg, FL
19:30 EST (UTC−5)	Barry 26'; Steinberger 86' (Barry)	Report		Stadium: Al Lang Stadium; Attendance: 7,234; Referee: Elvis Osmanovic

March 23, 2019 3	Saint Louis FC	1–1	Tampa Bay Rowdies	Fenton, MO
14:00 EST (UTC−5)	Dacres (yellow card) 22'; Fink 26'	Report	Diakité (yellow card) 63'; Morad (yellow card) 73'; Guenzatti 76' (pen.)	Stadium: Toyota Stadium; Attendance: 4,037; Referee: Ismir Pekmic

March 30, 2019 4	Tampa Bay Rowdies	0–0	Loudoun United	St. Petersburg, FL
19:30 EST (UTC−5)	Oduro (yellow card) 38'	Report	Pilato (yellow card) 16'; Verfurth (yellow card) 61'; Saravia (yellow card) 82'	Stadium: Al Lang Stadium; Attendance: 5,893; Referee: Gabriele Giusti

April 6, 2019 5	Tampa Bay Rowdies	4–0	Hartford Athletic	St. Petersburg, FL
19:30 EST (UTC−5)	Guenzatti 37', 78' (Fernandes), (yellow card) 67'; Najem 58'; Tinari 71' (Fernandes)	Report	Williams (yellow card) 73' de Wit (yellow card) 86'	Stadium: Al Lang Stadium; Attendance: 4,360; Referee: Thomas Snyder

April 13, 2019 6	Tampa Bay Rowdies	1–1	Louisville City	St. Petersburg, FL
19:30 EST (UTC−5)	Tinari 15'; Hoppenot (yellow card) 21'; Guenzatti (yellow card) 75'; Ekra (yellow card) 78'; Oduro (yellow card) 85'	Report	Jimenez (yellow card) 68'; Williams (yellow card) 85'; Thiam 88'	Stadium: Al Lang Stadium; Attendance: 5,707; Referee: Lorant Varga

April 24, 2019 7	Atlanta United 2	1–4	Tampa Bay Rowdies	Kennesaw, GA
19:30 EST (UTC−5)	Williams (yellow card) 30'; Fernando 34' (Pereira); Carleton (yellow card) 63'; Wyke (yellow card) 69'; Campbell (yellow card) 85'	Report	Oduro (yellow card) 36'; Diakité (yellow card) 39'; Fernandes 45' (Tinari); Morad (yellow card) 59'; Campbell 67' (o.g.); Tejada 87' (Fernandes); Allen 90' (Fernandes)	Stadium: Fifth Third Bank Stadium; Attendance: 1,537; Referee: Lukasz Szpala

April 27, 2019 8	Tampa Bay Rowdies	1–1	Charlotte Independence	St. Petersburg, FL
19:30 EST (UTC−5)	Guenzatti 17' (Tinari); Oduro (yellow card) 30'	Report	Oduro 11' (Thicot); Martínez (yellow card) 25'	Stadium: Al Lang Stadium; Attendance: 5,651; Referee: Daniel Gutierrez

May 1, 2019 9	Indy Eleven	0–0	Tampa Bay Rowdies	Indianapolis, IN
19:00 EST (UTC−5)	Barrett (yellow card) 13' (yellow-red card) 20'	Report	Taylor (yellow card) 88'	Stadium: Lucas Oil Stadium; Attendance: 8,035; Referee: Elvis Osmanovic

May 8, 2019 10	Nashville SC	0–1	Tampa Bay Rowdies	Nashville, TN
20:00 EST (UTC−5)	King (yellow card) 36'	Report	Tejada 34' (Guenzatti); Morad (yellow card) 90'; Kone (yellow card) 90+1'	Stadium: First Tennessee Park; Attendance: 6,628; Referee: Guido Gonzales, Jr.

May 18, 2019 11	Tampa Bay Rowdies	2–0	New York Red Bulls II	St. Petersburg, FL
19:30 EST (UTC−5)	Tejada 29' (Tinari), 58' (Poku); Oduro (red card) 72'; Diakité (red card) 90+1'	Report		Stadium: Al Lang Stadium; Attendance: 7,210; Referee: Ismir Pekmic
Note: Diakité was initially given a yellow that was changed to a red card upon further review by the league's Independent Discipline Panel.

May 25, 2019 12	Tampa Bay Rowdies	1–0	Swope Park Rangers	St. Petersburg, FL
19:30 EST (UTC−5)	Hoppenot (yellow card) 81'; Fernandes 82' (pen.)	Report	Wilson Harris (yellow card) 78'; Alexsander (yellow card) 81'; Akhmatov (yellow card) 83'	Stadium: Al Lang Stadium; Attendance: 5,688; Referee: Thomas Snyder

June 1, 2019 13	Birmingham Legion	0–2	Tampa Bay Rowdies	Birmingham, AL
20:00 EST (UTC−5)	Lopez (yellow card) 28'; Kasim (yellow card) 69'	Report	Johnson (yellow card) 20'; Guenzatti 28' (Tinari); Tinari 44' (Johnson); Richards (yellow card) 71'	Stadium: BBVA Compass Field; Attendance: 4,102; Referee: Matthew Thompson

June 8, 2019 14	Tampa Bay Rowdies	1–3	North Carolina FC	St. Petersburg, FL
19:30 EST (UTC−5)	Steinberger 54' (Morad); Hoppenot (yellow card) 61'	Report	Fortune 19' (Albadawi), 48' (Ewolo); Albadawi (yellow card) 28'; Miller 77' (Speas)	Stadium: Al Lang Stadium; Attendance: 5,167; Referee: Rosendo Mendoza

June 15, 2019 15	Tampa Bay Rowdies	1–1	Charleston Battery	St. Petersburg, FL
19:30 EST (UTC−5)	Guenzatti 39' (Johnson), (yellow card) 58'; Oduro (yellow card) 86'	Report	Nelson (yellow card) 29'; Svantesson 88' (Bosua); Rittmeyer (yellow card) 90'	Stadium: Al Lang Stadium; Attendance: 5,082; Referee: Michael Radchuk

June 22, 2019 16	Bethlehem Steel	1–2	Tampa Bay Rowdies	Bethlehem, PA
17:00 EST (UTC−5)	Chambers (yellow card) 29', (goal) 90+1' (pen.); Turner (yellow card) 50'; Borgelin (yellow card) 54'; Fontana (yellow card) 57'	Report	Tejada 13' (Steinberger); Guenzatti 34'	Stadium: Goodman Stadium; Attendance: 505; Referee: David Barrie

June 29, 2019 17	Tampa Bay Rowdies	2–1	Ottawa Fury	St. Petersburg, FL
20:00 EST (UTC−5)	Oduro (yellow card) 28'; Tejada 36' (Najem); Guenzatti (yellow card) 43', (goal) 90+2' (Mkosana)	Report	François 22'; Oliveira (yellow card) 53'	Stadium: Al Lang Stadium; Attendance: 5,396; Referee: Greg Dopka

July 7, 2019 18	Swope Park Rangers	1–3	Tampa Bay Rowdies	Kansas City, KS
17:00 EST (UTC−5)	Kuzain (yellow card) 37'; Smith (yellow card) 38'; Segbers (yellow card) 45+3'; Vanacore-Decker 72'	Report	Tejada 14' (Ekra); Guenzatti 39' (pen.); Steinberger (yellow card) 45+1'; Johnson (yellow card) 54', (goal) 58' (Guenzatti); Diakité (yellow card) 62'	Stadium: Children's Mercy Park; Attendance: 507; Referee: Mark Allatin

July 13, 2019 19	Pittsburgh Riverhounds	1–1	Tampa Bay Rowdies	Pittsburgh, PA
19:00 EST (UTC−5)	Kerr 52' (pen.)	Report	Morad (yellow card) 13'; Diakité (yellow card) 51'; Mkosana 84' (Poku)	Stadium: Highmark Stadium; Attendance: 3,045; Referee: Victor Rivas

July 20, 2019 20	Tampa Bay Rowdies	4–1	Saint Louis FC	St. Petersburg, FL
19:30 EST (UTC−5)	Guenzatti 33' (Fernandes), 36' (Mkosana); Oduro (yellow card) 69'; Fernandes 79' (Barry); Richards 90+1' (Guenzatti)	Report	Calvert (yellow card) 20'; Hilton (yellow card) 71'; Greig 87' (Hilton)	Stadium: Al Lang Stadium; Attendance: 4,520; Referee: Sergii Demianchuk

July 26, 2019 21	New York Red Bulls II	2–0	Tampa Bay Rowdies	Montclair, NJ
19:00 EST (UTC−5)	Jørgenson 17', 34' (Tolkin); Duncan (yellow card) 27' (yellow-red card) 62'; Barlow (yellow card) 47'; Lema (yellow card) 51'; Buckmaster (yellow card) 88'; Nealis (yellow card) 90+4'	Report	Guenzatti (yellow card) 23'; Diakité (yellow card) 37'	Stadium: MSU Soccer Park at Pittser Field; Attendance: 1,089; Referee: Luis Guardia

August 3, 2019 22	Charleston Battery	0–5	Tampa Bay Rowdies	Charleston, SC
19:30 EST (UTC−5)	Guerra (yellow card) 21' (yellow-red card) 42'; Anunga (yellow card) 31'; Mueller (yellow card) 64'	Report	Mkosana 1' (Steinberger), 4', (yellow card) 62'; Johnson 34'; Steinberger 47' (Johnson); Siaj 82' (Tinari)	Stadium: MUSC Health Stadium; Attendance: 2,640; Referee: Lukasz Szpala

August 10, 2019 23	Tampa Bay Rowdies	0–1	Birmingham Legion	St. Petersburg, FL
19:30 EST (UTC−5)	Diakité (yellow card) 84'	Report	Opoku 49' (Asiedu); Wright (yellow card) 66'; Williams (yellow card) 70'; Culbertson (yellow card) 88'	Stadium: Al Lang Stadium; Attendance: 4,949; Referee: Dejan Susak

August 21, 2019 24	North Carolina FC	4–2	Tampa Bay Rowdies	Cary, NC
19:00 EST (UTC−5)	Fortune 19' (Rennicks); Miller 50', 79' (Taylor); Diakité 76' (o.g.)	Report	Guenzatti 32' (Poku); Diakité (yellow card) 72'; Tejada 90' (Fernandez)	Stadium: WakeMed Soccer Park; Attendance: 2,833; Referee: Michael Radchuk

August 24, 2019 25	Tampa Bay Rowdies	5–0	Memphis 901	St. Petersburg, FL
19:30 EST (UTC−5)	Poku 11', 62' (Johnson); Fernandes (yellow card) 28', (goal) 81' (Guenzatti); Tinari 45+5' (Johnson); Johnson 87' (Kone)	Report	daSilva (yellow card) 36'; Charpie (yellow card) 47'	Stadium: Al Lang Stadium; Attendance: 4,835; Referee: Kevin Broadley

August 31, 2019 26	Tampa Bay Rowdies	1–2	Nashville SC	St. Petersburg, FL
19:30 EST (UTC−5)	Guenzatti 49'; Mkosana (yellow card) 90+3'	Report	Moloto 44'; Belmar 79' (Bourgeois)	Stadium: Al Lang Stadium; Attendance: 4,022; Referee: Daniel Gutierrez

September 7, 2019 27	Charlotte Independence	1–3	Tampa Bay Rowdies	Matthews, NC
19:00 EST (UTC−5)	Thicot (yellow card) 71'; Roberts 83'	Report	Tejada 7' (Fernandes), 49' (Guenzatti); Siaj 74' (Mkosana)	Stadium: Sportsplex at Matthews; Attendance: 1,930; Referee: Greg Dopka

September 14, 2019 28	Tampa Bay Rowdies	1–1	Atlanta United 2	St. Petersburg, FL
19:30 EST (UTC−5)	Guenzatti 31' (Fernandes); Oduro (yellow card) 68'	Report	Wyke 13'; Conway (yellow card) 35'	Stadium: Al Lang Stadium; Attendance: 4,367; Referee: Elton Garcia

September 18, 2019 29	Ottawa Fury	1–0	Tampa Bay Rowdies	Ottawa, ON
19:00 EST (UTC−5)	Fall (yellow card) 56' (yellow-red card) 90+2', (goal) 90+1' (pen.); Gagnon-Laparé (yellow card) 62'; Haworth (yellow card) 90+4'	Report	Diakité (yellow card) 56'; McCarthy (yellow card) 90+1'	Stadium: TD Place Stadium; Attendance: 3,200; Referee: Matt Souare

September 21, 2019 30	Tampa Bay Rowdies	6–1	Bethlehem Steel	St. Petersburg, FL
19:30 EST (UTC−5)	Ofeimu 20' (o.g.); Guenzatti 24' (Johnson); Poku 40' (Fernandes); Morad (yellow card) 42'; Tinari 45+2' (Johnson); Mkosana 71' (Fernandes), (yellow card) 74'; Taku 90+2' (Fernandes)	Report	Cortés (yellow card) 54'; Willis (yellow card) 65'; Faris 69' (pen.)	Stadium: Al Lang Stadium; Attendance: 5,513; Referee: Elvis Osmanovic

September 28, 2019 31	Louisville City	2–2	Tampa Bay Rowdies	Louisville, KY
19:00 EST (UTC−5)	Matsoso (yellow card) 30', (goal) 79' (Jimenez); Craig 35' (Jimenez)	Report	Morad (yellow card) 34'; Jordan Doherty (yellow card) 36' (yellow-red card) 83'; Guenzatti (yellow card) 45+1', (goal) 87' (pen.); Mkosana 89' (Barry); McCarthy (yellow card) 90+4'	Stadium: Louisville Slugger Field; Attendance: 10,630; Referee: Jon Freemon

October 4, 2019 32	Loudoun United	2–0	Tampa Bay Rowdies	Leesburg, VA
19:30 EST (UTC−5)	Ndour (yellow card) 18', (goal) 50' (Odoi-Atsem); Nyeman (yellow card) 41'; Hawkins (yellow card) 64'; Wild 90+3' (Ku-DiPietro)	Report	Guenzatti (yellow card) 64'; Siaj (yellow card) 77'	Stadium: Loudoun United Stadium; Attendance: 1,738; Referee: Ismir Pekmic

October 12, 2019 33	Tampa Bay Rowdies	1–1	Indy Eleven	St. Petersburg, FL
19:30 EST (UTC−5)	Guenzatti 45+6' (pen.); Mkosana (yellow card) 64'	Report	Barrett (yellow card) 64'; Kelly 72' (Pasher), (yellow card) 88'	Stadium: Al Lang Stadium; Attendance: 7,851; Referee: Lorant Varga

October 19, 2019 34	Hartford Athletic	2–1	Tampa Bay Rowdies	Hartford, CT
19:30 EST (UTC−5)	Williams (yellow card) 40', (goal) 47' (Hord); Gdula (yellow card) 62'; Wojcik 90+3' (Lee)	Report	Johnson (yellow card) 62' (yellow-red card) 68'; Mkosana 73' (Guenzatti); Diakité (yellow card) 80'	Stadium: Dillon Stadium; Attendance: 4,674; Referee: Sergii Demianchuk

=== USL Championship playoffs ===
The Rowdies clinched their spot in the single elimination 2019 USL playoffs on September 18, by virtue of the Charleston Battery losing, 3–1, to Atlanta United 2.

==== Conference Quarterfinals ====
October 26, 2019 East	Louisville City FC	2–1	Tampa Bay Rowdies	Louisville, Kentucky
7:00 p.m. EDT	Rasmussen 23' (McCabe), 24' (Ownby); Ownby (yellow card) 56'	Report	Ekra (yellow card) 40'; Diakité (yellow card) 70'; Guenzatti 80' (Poku)	Stadium: Louisville Slugger Field; Attendance: 4,636; Referee: Farhad Dadkho

=== U.S. Open Cup ===
May 14, 2019 2nd round	Tampa Bay Rowdies (Florida)	4–1	(Florida) The Villages SC	St. Petersburg, FL
7:00 PM EDT	Kone 43' (Steinberger), (yellow card) 88'; Steinberger 45+3'; Allen 62' (Steinberger); Soronellas (yellow card) 83'; Taylor 90+3'	Report	Lopes (yellow card) 43'; Gyau 62' (De Freitas)	Stadium: Al Lang Stadium; Attendance: 1,342; Referee: Matthew Miscannon

May 28, 2019 3rd round	OKC Energy FC (Oklahoma)	4–3	(Florida) Tampa Bay Rowdies	Norman, OK
7:30 pm CDT	Gordon 2'; Boesetti 27', (yellow card) 30'; Eissele 32'; Brown 60'	Report	Allen 20' (pen.), 47'; Najem 24'; Poku (yellow card) 34'	Stadium: John Crain Field; Attendance: 177; Referee: Elton Garcia

== Honors ==
=== Individual honors ===
- USL All-League

Papé Diakité (2nd team), Sebastián Guenzatti (2nd team)
