= Mohamed Kone (footballer, born 1993) =

Ivorian-born Burkinabé footballer

Personal information
- Full name: Mohamed Gnontcha Kone
- Date of birth: 12 December 1993 (age 32)
- Height: 1.89 m (6 ft 2 in)
- Position: Defensive midfielder

Youth career
- 2011–2014: Africa Sports

Senior career*
Years	Team	Apps	(Gls)
2015–2016	Saxan Gagauz Yeri	9	(0)
2015–2016	→ Zaria Bălți (loan)	25	(2)
2016	Apollon Limassol	0	(0)
2016	→ Karmiotissa (loan)	10	(0)
2017	Lokomotiv Tashkent	17	(0)
2018	Luch Minsk	0	(0)
2019	Tampa Bay Rowdies	13	(0)
2021	New Amsterdam	10	(0)
2021	FC Tucson	15	(0)
- * Club domestic league appearances and goals as of 31 December 2021

Mohamed Gnontcha Kone (born 12 December 1993) is an Ivorian-born Burkinabé football player.

== Career ==
=== Club ===
On 4 August 2016, Kone signed for Apollon Limassol, before joining Karmiotissa Pano Polemidion on loan the same day.

In January 2017, Kone signed for Uzbek League side Lokomotiv Tashkent, being presented as a new player on 7 March 2017.

On 26 March 2018, Luch Minsk announced the signing of Kone.

Kone joined the Tampa Bay Rowdies on 5 February 2019.

In 2021, Kone signed with the National Independent Soccer Association's New Amsterdam FC. Kone debuted for NAFC during the club's Legends Cup match against Chattanooga FC on 16 April 2021.

Kone signed with FC Tucson on August 5, 2021.

=== International ===
On 21 August 2017, Kone was called up to the Burkina Faso national team for the first time, for their 2018 FIFA World Cup qualification matches against Senegal on 2 and 5 September 2017.

== Career statistics ==
=== Club ===
As of match played 2 November 2021

Appearances and goals by club, season and competition
Club	Season	League			National Cup		Continental		Other		Total	
Club	Season	Division	Apps	Goals	Apps	Goals	Apps	Goals	Apps	Goals	Apps	Goals
Saxan Gagauz Yeri	2014–15	Divizia Națională	9	0	0	0	-		-		9	0
Saxan Gagauz Yeri	2015–16	Divizia Națională	0	0	0	0	2	0	-		2	0
Saxan Gagauz Yeri	Total		9	0	0	0	2	0	-	-	11	0
Zaria Bălți (loan)	2015–16	Divizia Națională	25	2	3	0	–		–		28	2
Apollon Limassol	2016–17	Cypriot First Division	0	0	0	0	–		–		0	0
Karmiotissa Pano Polemidion (loan)	2016–17	Cypriot First Division	10	0	0	0	–		–		10	0
Lokomotiv Tashkent	2017	Uzbekistan Super League	17	0	6	0	4	0	–		27	0
Luch Minsk	2018	Belarusian Premier League	0	0	0	0	–		–		0	0
Tampa Bay Rowdies	2019	USL Championship	13	0	2	0	–		–		15	0
New Amsterdam FC	2020–21	National Independent Soccer Association	10	0	0	0	–		–		10	0
FC Tucson	2021	USL League One	13	0	0	0	–		–		13	0
Career total			97	2	11	0	6	0	-	-	114	2
