= David Abidor =

American soccer player (born 1992)

Personal information
- Date of birth: October 5, 1992 (age 34)
- Place of birth: Northbrook, Illinois, U.S.
- Height: 1.86 m (6 ft 1 in)
- Position: Defender

College career
Years	Team	Apps	(Gls)
2011–2013	Dayton Flyers	51	(0)
2014	Creighton Bluejays	20	(0)

Senior career*
Years	Team	Apps	(Gls)
2013	Jersey Express	2	(0)
2014	IMG Academy Bradenton	13	(1)
2015	Dalkurd FF	4	(0)
2016	Tulsa Roughnecks	29	(1)
2017	New York Red Bulls II	19	(1)
2018	FC Haka	21	(1)
2019	Hapoel Petah Tikva	17	(0)
2019	Hapoel Bnei Lod	7	(0)
2020	Oakland Roots	4	(0)
2021	Chicago House	14	(0)

Managerial career
- 2021–2022: St. Ignatius Wolfpack (assistant)
- 2023–: Roosevelt Lakers (assistant)
Medal record
Representing United States
Football
Maccabiah Games
Gold medal – first place	2013 Maccabiah	Football
- * Club domestic league appearances and goals as of April 5, 2024

David Abidor (nicknamed "Slabby"; born October 5, 1992) is an American soccer player. He played college soccer for University of Dayton and Creighton University, and in 2012 was named All-America by Jewish Sports Review. He has also played for Dalkurd FF, Tulsa Roughnecks, New York Red Bulls II, FC Haka, Hapoel Petah Tikva, Hapoel Bnei Lod, and the Oakland Roots. Abidor played for Team USA at the 2013 Maccabiah Games in Israel, winning a gold medal.

== Early life ==
He was born in Northbrook, Illinois, and is Jewish. His parents are Boris and Anna Abidor. He attended Glenbrook South High School, for which he played soccer.

== Career ==
=== College and amateur ===
Abidor played four years of college soccer, three at Dayton University (where he was a business major) from 2011 to 2013, playing in 51 games (47 starts). He played in his senior year at Creighton University (where he was a finance major) 2014.

In 2011 he was a Preseason A-10 All-Rookie Team selection. In 2012 he was named All-America by Jewish Sports Review.

Abidor competed in the Premier Development League with both Jersey Express and IMG Academy Bradenton.

=== Professional ===
Abidor went undrafted in the 2015 MLS SuperDraft. After a trial with Real Salt Lake, Abidor moved to Swedish Division 1 side Dalkurd FF. He struggled for playing time and spent a brief time with fifth-tier side IFK Stockaryd/Rörviks IF.

He then returned to the United States with United Soccer League side Tulsa Roughnecks. Abidor made his debut for Tulsa on 27 March 2016, scoring the opening goal for his club in a 2–0 victory over Rio Grande Valley FC Toros. In his one season with Tulsa he appeared in 29 league matches scoring 1 goal.

On 21 March 2017, Abidor signed with New York Red Bulls II after joining the team for a preseason trial. He made his debut with the club on 25 March 2017, starting in a 3–3 draw with Pittsburgh Riverhounds. On 14 April 2017, Abidor scored his first goal for New York, helping the club to a 3–1 victory over Orlando City B. He left the club in December 2017 at the end of his contract.

In April 2018, Abidor joined FC Haka in Ykkönen.

In 2019 he played in Israel with Hapoel Petah Tikva and with Hapoel Bnei Lod. In 2020, Abidor then returned to the United States to join Oakland Roots SC.

Abidor signed with first-year National Independent Soccer Association club Chicago House AC, becoming the first defender to join the club.

== International ==
Abidor played for Team USA at the 2013 Maccabiah Games in Israel, winning a gold medal.
