= Drew Conner =

American soccer player

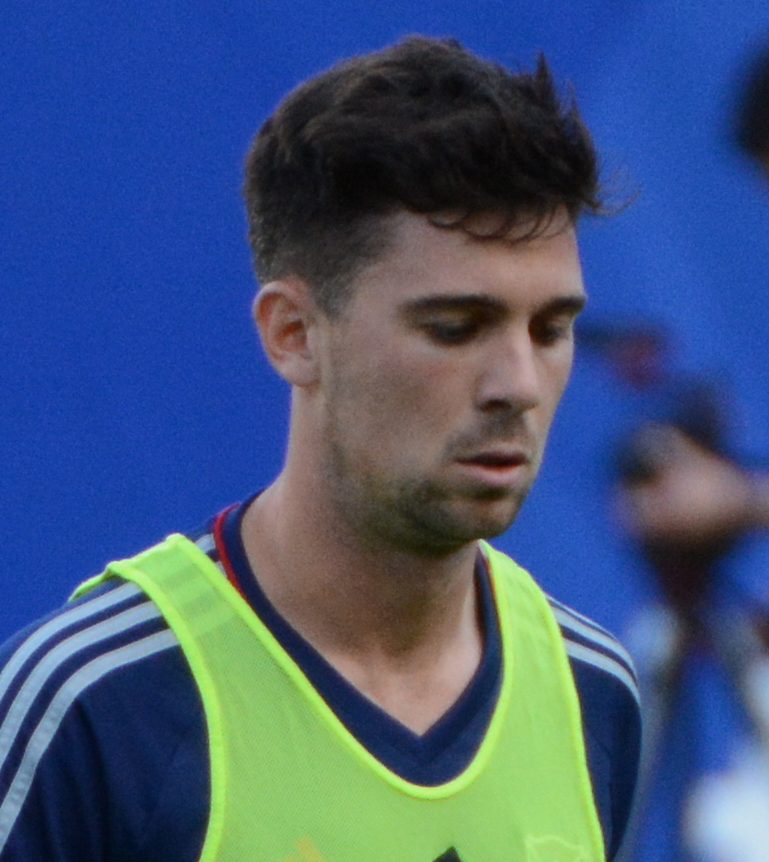
- Conner with Chicago Fire in 2017

Personal information
- Full name: Andrew Benjamin Conner
- Date of birth: February 18, 1994 (age 32)
- Place of birth: Cary, Illinois, U.S.
- Height: 1.80 m (5 ft 11 in)
- Position: Midfielder

Youth career
- 2008–2012: Chicago Fire

College career
Years	Team	Apps	(Gls)
2012–2015	Wisconsin Badgers	73	(6)

Senior career*
Years	Team	Apps	(Gls)
2012–2015	Chicago Fire U-23	17	(3)
2016–2018	Chicago Fire	32	(0)
2016	→ Saint Louis FC (loan)	12	(0)
2019	Znojmo	8	(0)
2019–2020	Indy Eleven	28	(3)
2021	Chicago House	17	(1)
2022	Forward Madison	18	(0)
- * Club domestic league appearances and goals as of October 16, 2022

Drew Conner (born February 18, 1994) is an American former professional soccer player who played as a midfielder.

== Career ==
=== Youth and college ===
Conner was a member of the Chicago Fire Academy for five seasons before spending his college career at the University of Wisconsin.

Conner also played in the Premier Development League for Chicago Fire U-23.

=== Professional ===
On December 17, 2015, Conner signed a homegrown player contract with the Chicago Fire.

Conner was loaned to Chicago's United Soccer League affiliate Saint Louis FC on March 25, 2016. He made his debut with the club just one day later, appearing as a substitute in a match against the Real Monarchs.

In 2017, Conner impressed in the preseason. He made his MLS debut on Saturday, March 4 in Columbus, coming on in the 95th minute of extra time as an injury replacement for John Goosens. He came on as a substitute against Atlanta United on Saturday March, 18th.

Connor was released by Chicago at the end of their 2018 season.

After a two-season stint at USL Championship side Indy Eleven, Conner signed for Chicago House AC, becoming the first player in their history. He was named captain of the team and scored on his debut, netting a penalty in a 3–2 loss to Detroit City FC.

Conner played an instrumental role in the House's inaugural season, making 17 appearances in total and recording three assists. He announced his departure from the club on February 22, 2022.

On March 1, 2022, Conner signed with USL League One side Forward Madison.

Conner announced his retirement from professional soccer on April 2, 2023, on his Instagram account.
