= Icarus FC =

Sporting Goods manufacturer

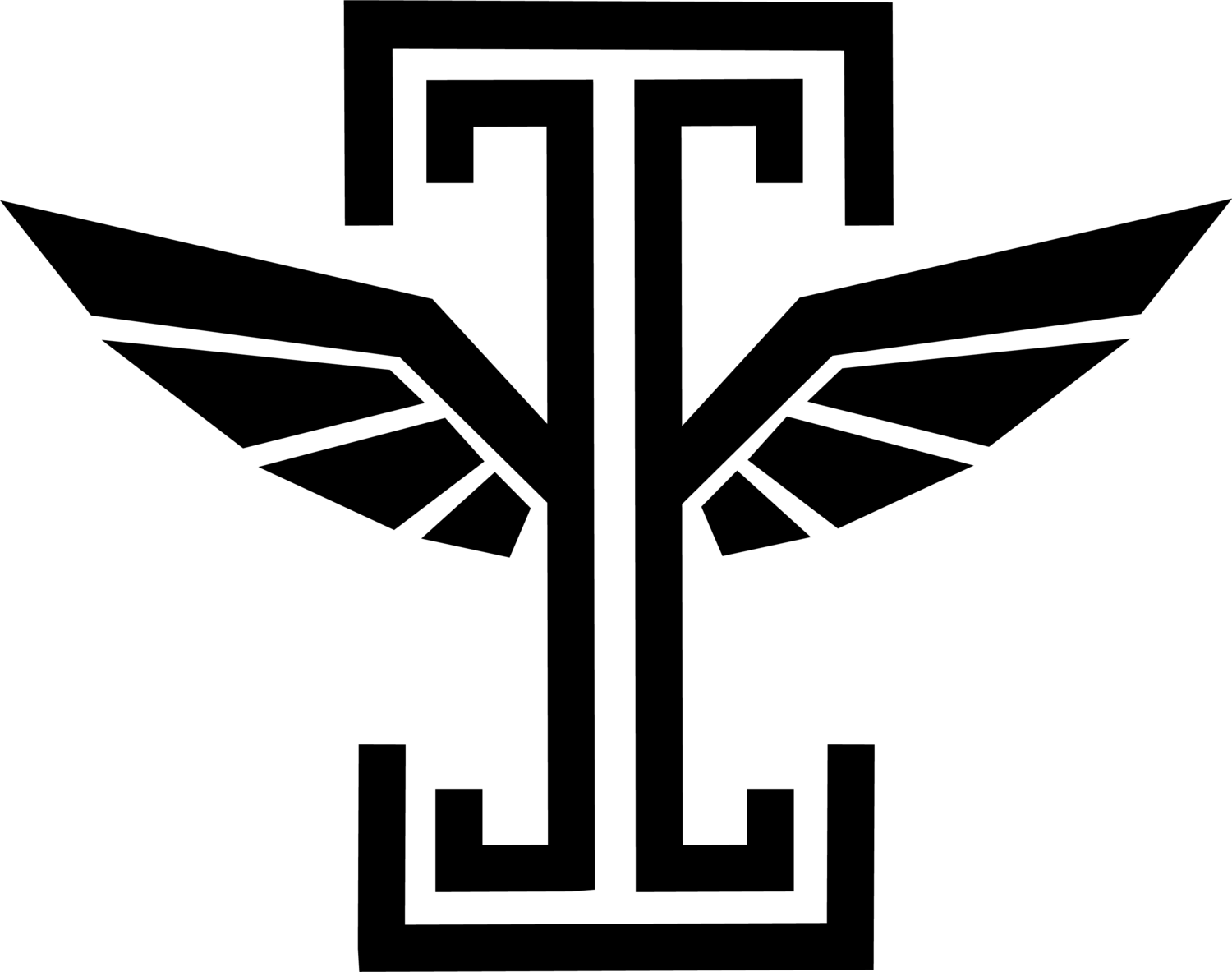
- Company type: Private
- Industry: Sports equipment
- Founded: 2017; 9 years ago
- Founder: Robert Smukler
- Headquarters: USA, Philadelphia
- Area served: Worldwide
- Products: Kits, Sportswear
- Website: https://www.icarusfc.com/

Icarus is a football kit and apparel brand based out of Philadelphia, United States. Icarus was created to provide clubs with original and creative jerseys that represent their identity. Since its inception in 2017, Icarus has partnered with over 3000 clubs from around the world, including those that play in national leagues like NISA, UPSL, NPSL and USL League 2.

In 2020, Icarus moved into a new warehouse in Philadelphia and established a Regional Office in London to work with clubs in the UK and Europe.

== Partnerships ==
Icarus is the official kit and apparel supplier of numerous association football teams, players and associations, including:

=== Associations ===
- (United States) USWNTPA

=== Club teams ===
North America

- (United States) AFC Columbia
- (United States) Atlantic City FC
- (United States) Fall River Marksmen
- (United States) FC Motown
- (United States) Fort Wayne FC
- (United States) Louisiana Krewe FC
- (United States) Maryland Bobcats FC
- (United States) New Amsterdam FC
- (United States) Palm Beach Breakers
- (United States) Philadelphia Lone Star
- (United States) Providence City FC

Europe

- (Armenia) Lernayin Artsakh FC (female)
- (Iceland) Elidi FC (3. Deild Karla)
- (Republic of Ireland) Ormeau Road Celtic FC
- (England) Portobello FC

Africa

- (Botswana) Miscellaneous SC Serowe
- (Ghana) Accra Great Olympics
- (Ghana) Bibiani Gold Stars F.C.
- (Ghana) Ebusua Dwarfs
- (Ghana) Samartex
- (Ghana) Sekondi Hasaacas FC

=== Club teams ===
Asia

(Bhutan) Thimphu City FC (Until 2024 season).
