= Mayele Malango =

Malawian footballer (born 1997)

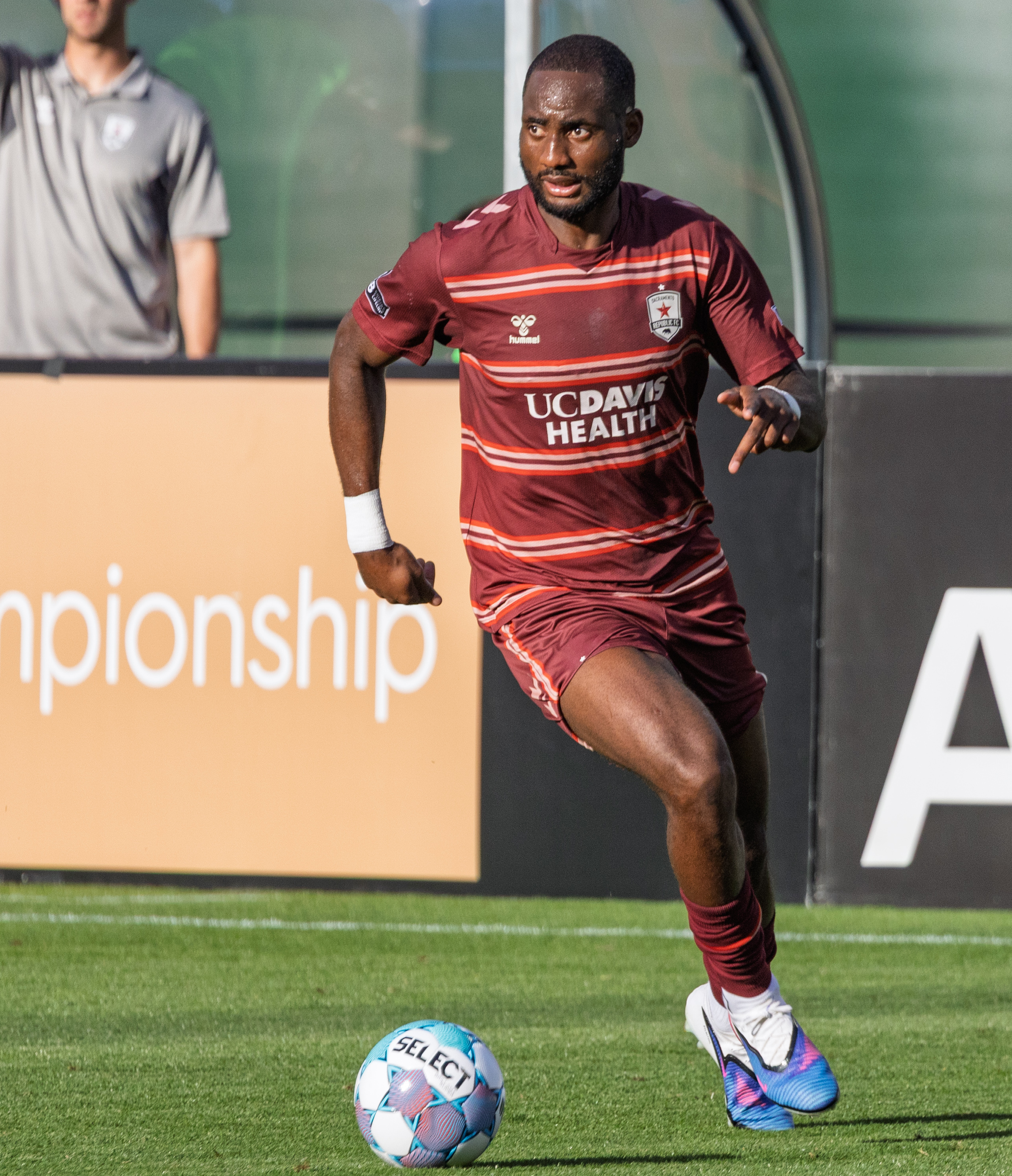
- Malango with the Sacramento Republic in 2026

Personal information
- Date of birth: 25 February 1997 (age 29)
- Place of birth: Kinshasa, Zaire (now DRC)
- Height: 1.85 m (6 ft 1 in)
- Position: Forward

Team information
- Current team: Sacramento Republic
- Number: 7

College career
| Years | Team | Apps | (Gls) |
| 2017 | Salem State Vikings | 19 | (17) |
| 2018 | UMass Lowell River Hawks | 18 | (1) |

Senior career*
| Years | Team | Apps | (Gls) |
| 2018–2019 | Boston Bolts | 13 | (5) |
| 2020 | New England Revolution II | 14 | (1) |
| 2021 | New Amsterdam | 14 | (9) |
| 2022 | Albion San Diego | 20 | (3) |
| 2023–2025 | Chattanooga Red Wolves | 47 | (9) |
| 2025–2026 | Monterey Bay | 25 | (5) |
| 2026– | Sacramento Republic | 25 | (1) |

International career^{‡}
| 2025– | Malawi | 1 | (0) |
- * Club domestic league appearances and goals as of 11:51, 11 November 2026 (UTC) ‡ National team caps and goals as of 23:01, 10 September 2025 (UTC)

Mayele Malango (born 25 February 1997) is a professional footballer who currently plays for Sacramento Republic FC in the USL Championship. Born in the Democratic Republic of the Congo, he plays for the Malawi national team.

== Career ==
=== Boston Bolts ===
Malango played with USL League Two side Boston Bolts in 2018 and 2019.

=== New England Revolution II ===
Malango joined USL League One side New England Revolution II in January 2020. Malango's contract option was declined by New England on November 30, 2020.

=== New Amsterdam ===
In March 2021, Malango joined National Independent Soccer Association side New Amsterdam FC.

=== Albion San Diego ===
On March 29, 2022, Albion San Diego announced that they signed Malango for their 2022 NISA campaign.

=== Chattanooga Red Wolves SC ===
Malango joined Chattanooga Red Wolves SC ahead of the 2023 season, contributing three goals and an assist. The club exercised his option for 2024.

=== Monterey Bay FC ===
Malango made the move up to the USL Championship on December 6, 2024, signing for Monterey Bay FC. Following the 2025 season, Monterey Bay exercised Malango's contract option for the 2026 season.

=== Sacramento Republic FC ===
It was announced on January 8, 2026, that Malango was transferred by Monterey Bay to fellow USL Championship club Sacramento Republic FC. At the time of the transfer it was a record fee for Monterey Bay.

== International career ==
Born in the Democratic Republic of the Congo, Malango was raised in a refugee camp in Malawi. He was called up to the Malawi national team for a set of 2026 FIFA World Cup qualification matches in September 2025, debuting in a 2–1 win over Namibia on 6 September 2025.

== Personal ==
Raised in Malawi in Dzaleka Refugee Camp, Mayele and his family were refugees from DRC.
