= New Amsterdam FC =

Soccer club based in Hempstead, New York

- Full name: New Amsterdam Football Club
- Nickname: Cannons
- Founded: April 20, 2020
- Dissolved: 2022; 4 years ago
- Stadium: Hofstra University Soccer Stadium; Hempstead, New York
- Capacity: 1,600
- Owner: Laurence Girard
- League: NISA
- Fall 2021: 4th.
Home colors	Away colors	Third colors

New Amsterdam Football Club was an American professional soccer club based in Hempstead, New York, that previously played in the National Independent Soccer Association (NISA), the third tier of American soccer. New Amsterdam FC was established on April 20, 2020, and began play in July 2020. They were expelled from the league in January 2022 and folded.

The club was founded by both Laurence Girard and Maximilian Mansfield, with Mansfield serving as sporting director. The name is a reference to New Amsterdam, the 17th-century Dutch settlement that eventually became New York City.

== History ==
=== Founding ===
In November 2019 it was reported that a possible New York–based group had applied for a team in the National Independent Soccer Association, a new third division soccer league. It was then further reported in January 2020 that the investor involved in the New York group was rumored to be Laurence Girard, the CEO of medtech company Fruit Street Health.

A few months later, on April 20, the rumors were confirmed and New Amsterdam FC was officially announced as a New York-based NISA side. At the time of the reveal, it was not announced when New Amsterdam FC would begin playing.

The club was involved with controversy almost from the start, as two competing Twitter accounts both claimed to be the official account of New Amsterdam FC. The first account "@NAFCNY" gathered over 2,000 followers and the second account "@nfcny" barely had 100 when NISA declared that the second account was the "real" official Twitter account, leading to speculation that the club was in dispute with their original social media manager who then refused to hand over access, necessitating a new handle. When the club went on hiatus in 2022, @nafcny still had less than half the followers the original "unofficial" account originally drew.

=== "Local approach" ===
In May 2020, it was stated by New Amsterdam sporting director Maximilian Mansfield that the team would opt for a local approach, similar to Spanish club Athletic Bilbao, where 50 to 60 percent of the team will be local New Yorkers. On July 1, 2020, it was announced that New Amsterdam FC would be participating in the NISA Independent Cup, a pre-season tournament created by the league in the wake of the COVID-19 pandemic to replace the canceled 2020 Spring Season.

Just days later, on July 3, New Amsterdam FC announced their first signing, midfielder Martin Williams from Brooklyn. In the lead-up to the NISA Independent Cup, NAFC held its practices at soccer fields in Battery Park City, near the apartment of owner Girard.

=== Inaugural season ===
On July 28, the team announced that due to the ongoing COVID-19 pandemic in New York City it would play its inaugural matches in both the Independent Cup and the Fall 2020 season (both against fellow NISA newcomer and local rival New York Cosmos) behind closed doors at the Hudson Sports Complex in Warwick, New York, 55 miles northwest of New York City. The team announced that it planned to move games back into the city proper as soon as fans are able to attend.

Former US international and Major League Soccer player Eric Wynalda was announced as the first coach in team history on July 30. 18 days later, partway through the NISA Independent Cup and four days before the start of the club's inaugural season, Wynalda stepped down for personal reasons. Sporting director Maximilian Mansfield was named interim manager.

NAFC finished the Independent Cup in last place in the Mid-Atlantic Region, with one point in three games (a record of zero wins, 1 draw, and two losses).

Their struggles continued into the Fall 2020 season, with New Amsterdam going winless in their first fifteen league matches. The club won their first match in club history on June 16, 2021, over San Diego 1904 FC, snapping an eighteen match winless streak across all official competitions. That would be their only win in NISA.

Owner Girard courted controversy by subbing himself in as goalkeeper in the second half of a tied game against the New York Cosmos on August 20. Girard, who had been on the New York Red Bulls academy U18 team for nine months, let in two goals and New Amsterdam lost the match.

New Amsterdam FC ended its inaugural season with a total record of one win, nine losses, and no draws.

Jermaine Jones, who had played for multiple MLS and Bundesliga clubs as well as the German and USMNT, was hired as an assistant coach for the last game of the season and was later interviewed for the vacant head coaching job. Jones lost out to former MLS and Senegalese national goalkeeper Bouna Coundoul Jones left the club, telling the players that he was passed over for the head job because he would not promise in advance to let owner Lawrence Girard play goalkeeper, and Coundoul was.

=== Second season ===
New Amsterdam had more success in its sophomore season. With COVID restrictions lifting, the club was able to move to a new home at Hofstra University Soccer Stadium in Nassau County, just seven miles from the Queens border.

The club's goalkeeper controversy continued in 2021, however; Girard appeared on the team sheet as a backup goalkeeper for most matches, and even started at least two matches (which NAFC lost 2-1 and 6-1). This presumed interference from the owner prompted mockery and derision from watchers of the league.

The club finished the 2021 Independence Cup with four points (1-1-1), good for second place in the New England Region. They continued to improve in the 2021 Fall season, ending with a record of 7 wins, 2 draws, and 9 losses. The resulting 23 points put them in fourth place in the league's single-table standings, out of ten teams. Along the way, they set the league's season high for biggest home win with a 4–0 drubbing of San Diego 1904 FC on November 21.

=== Departure from NISA ===
Behind the scenes, Girard was feuding with the league. He would later claim that the league failed to provide financial statements, while NISA responded that neither New Amsterdam FC nor Chicago House AC (also owned by Laurence Girard and his family) had paid their league dues for 2021. In a mid-December email to the NISA board of governors, Girard threatened to pull his clubs from competition unless he was granted loans from the league.

On January 25, 2022, the league issued a press release to announce that neither NAFC nor Chicago House would be playing in the U.S. Open Cup. On February 1, it was reported that the NISA board had voted, 6–2, to kick NAFC out of the league. The 2022 NISA schedule was released the following day, with both NAFC and Chicago House removed. Girard responded by filing suit in Delaware's Chancery Court, seeking to have both teams reinstated. Chicago House later joined the Midwest Premier League beginning with the 2022 season.

Co-founder Maximilian Mansfield would later be hired as President and CEO of the second-division club Brooklyn FC. Asked about what he learned during his time with NAFC, Mansfield replied "just know who you're working with, know who you're getting into business with, that's super important and something to learn from."

=== Additional lawsuit ===
In the spring of 2022, a lawsuit was filed against both New Amsterdam FC and owner Laurence Girard for failing to repay a $100,000 loan. The plaintiff was Equality Football, LLC, a company owned in part by NISA Commissioner John Prutch and Bob Friedland, owner of NISA side Los Angeles Force. Gerard admitted that Equality Football had loaned NAFC the money for operations in early 2021, but had decided not to pay it back due to what he called the "criminally usurious" terms (including an interest rate of initial 90% rate as of March 2022, and then a 10% monthly rate thereafter), claiming those terms violated New York state laws and made the loan itself illegal and unenforceable. Gerard extended his criticism to the league itself, saying "Other teams (in NISA) have been provided with similar loans. A soccer league should be providing grants or media revenue to clubs to help them launch — not criminally usurious loans." New Amsterdam’s attorneys filed a motion to dismiss which was granted by the court. NAFC argued that Bob Friedland’s loan was criminally usurious and void as a matter of law.

== Colors and badge ==
The club's colors were black and white, with shades of grey and orange (referencing the Netherlands national football team) used as accent colors.

The club's badge was designed by British designer Christopher Payne. It features a 16th century Dutch sailing ship, referring to New York's Dutch past. The badge shape was inspired by the arch of the Whitestone Bridge.

Payne also designed the club's inaugural season kits. The home jersey featured a faint graphic of the Manhattan street grid and sleeve graphics referencing the Chrysler Building's spire. The away kit was all orange, with a sublimated graphic on the jersey referencing the Dutch national team shirts worn in Euro 1988.

Kit suppliers and shirt sponsors
Period	Kit supplier	Shirt sponsor	Notes
2020	Errea	Fruit Street Health	Contract was originally announced as through 2023, but was cancelled after ten months
2021	Icarus	Fruit Street Health	

== Club culture ==
=== Associated teams ===
The team also established reserve sides in both local and national amateur leagues. New Amsterdam FC II-SASC, formerly known as Sporting Astoria SC, played one season in the NISA Nation, Eastern Premier Soccer League and Cosmopolitan Soccer League system. Bronx River Futbol Club, which began play in the United Premier Soccer League in 2020 as a partnership between Sporting Astoria and NAFC, was to change its name to New Amsterdam FC III beginning in the Spring 2021 season, but retained its original name when New Amsterdam FC went on hiatus.

=== Academy ===
The team established an academy with U17 and U19 teams in January 2022. They trained at College Point Fields in early 2022. They then trained at Jack McManus Field in Roosevelt Island.

== Players and staff ==
=== Players ===
As of February 29, 2024

=== Coaching staff ===
As of February 29, 2024

Technical staff
Sporting director	vacant
Head coach	vacant
Assistant coach	vacant

== Statistics and records ==
=== Season-by-season ===
Season	NISA									Playoffs	U.S. Open Cup	North America	Top Scorer	
Season	Div	P	W	D	L	GF	GA	Pts	Position	Playoffs	U.S. Open Cup	North America	Player	League
2020–21	Fall	4	0	0	4	1	12	0	5th, Eastern	Group stage	DNQ	DNQ	—	—
2020–21	Spring	6	1	0	5	5	8	0	—	—	DNQ	DNQ	—	—
2021–22	Fall	18	7	2	9	29	29	23	4th	single table, no playoffs	—	—	—	—
2021–22	Spring	Did not play							—	—	—	—	—	—
