= Chicago House AC =

American soccer club in Chicago

- Full name: Chicago House Athletic Club
- Nickname: CHAC
- Founded: 2020; 6 years ago
- Stadium: Langhorst Field, Elmhurst
- Capacity: 2,500
- Owner: Laurence Girard
- President: Peter Wilt
- Head coach: Shannon Seymour
- League: Midwest Premier League
- 2024: MWPL Heartland Division 1, 3rd
- Website: www.chicagohouseac.com
Home colours	Away colours

Chicago House Athletic Club is an American semi-professional men's soccer club owned by Laurence Girard and led by CEO Peter Wilt. The club is based in Chicago, Illinois. They began play in August 2021 as a professional club, competing in the third-tier National Independent Soccer Association (NISA). After being expelled from the league in January 2022, the club currently plays in the semi-professional Midwest Premier League.

== History ==
On September 10, 2020, the National Independent Soccer Association (NISA) announced that an investor group, led by league founder Peter Wilt, had applied for a club to play in the Chicago market. Wilt had previously attempted to start a new Chicago team in 2016 with the North American Soccer League (NASL) and more recently in 2018, following his departure from NISA, successfully started the Madison, Wisconsin based Forward Madison FC in USL League One. Other investors included Bruce Merivale-Austin.

On November 5, NISA officially announced the team had been accepted with an aim to begin play in Fall 2021. In the following months, the team asked fans to submit potential team names that related to the history and culture of Chicago. The team selected 68 finalists and held a fan advisory poll bracket, dubbed "Moniker Madness", to determine the most popular option. The winner of the poll, "Chicago House" was unveiled as the official name on February 23, 2021, alongside the team crest and colors.

On January 27, 2021, the team confirmed that it would play home matches at SeatGeek Stadium in Bridgeview, Illinois. On February 2, former Chicago Fire FC player and all-time appearance leader C. J. Brown was announced as the team's first technical director and head coach.

On May 1, 2021, the team announced that Lindsey Morgan Sacks would become the new primary team owner, taking control of the club from Bruce Merivale-Austin.

On July 9, 2021, the team played their official first match in club history, losing 2–0 to amateur side FC Milwaukee Torrent in the 2021 NISA Independent Cup.

Two weeks later, the House defeated Union Dubuque FC by a score of 5–0 to end the Independent Cup campaign with a first win in club history.

The club finished 6th in its inaugural season, posting a 7-2-9 record. Wojciech Wojcik was the team's top scorer, notching eight goals.

Behind the scenes, ownership was feuding with the league; NISA reported that neither Chicago House nor New Amsterdam FC (owned by Sacks's husband Laurence Girard) had paid their league dues for 2021. In a mid-December email to the NISA board of governors, Gerard threatened to pull his clubs from competition unless he was granted loans from the league to run them. Girard would later assert that he himself is the primary team owner and controlling shareholder of Chicago House AC, with "full voting control of the club".

On January 25, 2022, the league issued a press release to announce that neither New Amsterdam nor Chicago House would be playing in the U.S. Open Cup. The 2022 NISA schedule was released the following month, with both NAFC and Chicago House removed. The clubs responded by filing suit in Delaware's Chancery Court, seeking to both be reinstated. New Amsterdam went on hiatus, but in March 2022 the House announced via social media that the club would join the semi-professional Midwest Premier League for the upcoming season.

The House announced its initial Midwest Premier League schedule via social media and also announced it would play its home matches at Stuart Field, on the campus of Illinois Institute of Technology.

The House finished 4th in the MWPL in 2022 with a 5–5–1 record. At the end of the season, the club announced its intention to compete in local qualifiers for the Lamar Hunt U.S. Open Cup. After receiving a bye in the first round, CHAC defeated 1927 SC on penalties after a 1–1 draw, Metro Louisville FC 2–1, and Brockton FC United in another penalty shootout to advance to the competition proper. Chicago House then defeated National Amateur Cup champions Bavarian United SC 1–0 to record its first-ever cup win and move on to the second round and face Forward Madison FC of USL League 1. After trailing 2–0 at halftime, Chicago scored two goals to force extra time and a third to win 3–2 and advance to the third round. They faced Major League Soccer side Chicago Fire FC at the House's former home SeatGeek Stadium on April 26, where their cup run ended with a 3-0 loss.

The club announced its 2023 MWPL schedule via social media and that it would play its home matches at DePaul College Prep on its new stadium in Roscoe Village on the North Side near Lane Tech.

After two seasons at DePaul Prep, the club announced via social media it was relocating to Langhorst Field on the campus of Elmhurst College starting in 2025, joining it's women's team.

== Club identity ==
The club's name, Chicago House Athletic Club, was announced on February 21, 2021, and refers to the Chicago house style of music. It was one of 400 entries submitted for a public contest; the 68 finalist names were picked through public votes in a bracket tournament. The club's logo uses the municipal device of Chicago and the letterforms suggest the city skyline. The team's colors are "Patina Green", black, and "deep rust" (a shade of orange).

== Players and staff ==
=== Current roster ===
As of November 19, 2024

Note: Flags indicate national team as defined under FIFA eligibility rules; some limited exceptions apply. Players may hold more than one non-FIFA nationality.

No.	Pos.	Nation	Player
2	DF	USA	Jack Kramer
3	GK	USA	Ryan Grady
5	FW	USA	Aryan Kamdar
6	DF	USA	Jasper Waddington
7	MF	USA	Gilberto Angeles
9	FW	USA	Nico Williams
10	FW	USA	Kikis Avalos
11	FW	USA	Alejandro Mentasti
12	FW	USA	Ugochukwu Archara
14	MF	USA	AR Smith (captain)
15	DF	USA	Pau Chacon

No.	Pos.	Nation	Player
17	GK	USA	Tony Halterman
19	FW	USA	Isaac Carnalla
20	DF	USA	Austin Montejano
21	DF	USA	Daniel Hayes
22	MF	USA	Jhon Alzate
23	MF	USA	Aaron Moreno
24	FW	USA	Zeddy Adlam
26	MF	USA	Elias McCloud
27	MF	USA	Damian Iamarino
30	DF	USA	Daniel Lacost

=== Coaches ===
- Head coach: Shannon Seymour
- Assistant coach: Jacob Rutledge
- Athletic trainer: Luis Perez

=== Front office ===
- Primary owner: Laurence Girard
- President: Peter Wilt
- Chief operating officer: Brian Koenig

=== Head coach history ===
Dates	Name	Nationality
2021	C. J. Brown	United States
2022–2024	Matt Poland	United States
2024	Spencer Pappas	United States
2024–present	Shannon Seymour	United States

== Record ==
=== Men's team ===
Season	Record										Position		U.S. Open Cup	Average attendance	Top goalscorer	
Season	Tier	League	Conf/Div	Pld	W	D	L	GF	GA	Pts	Conf	Ovr	U.S. Open Cup	Average attendance	Name	Goals
2021	3	NISA	—	18	7	2	9	18	26	23	—	6th	Not held	1,098	(Poland) Wojciech Wojcik	8
2022	—	MWPL	West	11	5	5	1	37	19	20	4th	—	Ineligible			
2023	—	MWPL	Heartland	10	5	3	2	34	11	18	3rd	—	Round 3		(United States) Kikis Avalos	9
2024	—	MWPL	Heartland Division 1	10	6	1	3	21	12	19	3rd	—	Round 1		(United States) Kikis Avalos	8
2025												—	4th Qualifying Round			
2026												—	4th Qualifying Round			
2027												—	3rd Qualifying Round			

=== Women's team ===
Season	Record										Position	Playoffs
Season	Tier	League	Conf/Div	Pld	W	D	L	GF	GA	Pts	Position	Playoffs
2025	4	WPSL	North Lakes/Lake Michigan	10	5	1	4	21	12	16	3rd	did not qualify
2026	4	WPSL	Lake Shore Conference	10	7	2	1	28	7	22	3rd	did not qualify
