= Wojciech Wojcik =

Polish footballer

Personal information
- Date of birth: 31 May 1992 (age 34)
- Place of birth: Dąbrowa Tarnowska, Poland
- Height: 1.93 m (6 ft 4 in)
- Position: Forward

Team information
- Current team: Chicago House
- Number: 9

Youth career
- 2008–2010: Chicago Fire
- 2013: Bridges FC

College career
Years	Team	Apps	(Gls)
2010–2013	Bradley Braves	81	(14)

Senior career*
Years	Team	Apps	(Gls)
2014	FC Ilves	17	(2)
2014	Ilves-Kissat	2	(1)
2015–2016	Indy Eleven	22	(2)
2016	→ Oklahoma City Energy (loan)	23	(4)
2017	Oklahoma City Energy	17	(3)
2018	New York Cosmos B	10	(7)
2019	Hartford Athletic	31	(7)
2020	Forward Madison	16	(3)
2021	Chicago House	18	(8)
- * Club domestic league appearances and goals as of 5 November 2023

Wojciech Wojcik (born 31 May 1992) is a Polish professional footballer who plays as a forward.

== Early life ==
Wojcik was born in Poland, but grew up in Chicago, training with the Chicago Fire Academy while in high school.

== Career ==
In February 2015, Wojcik signed for North American Soccer League side Indy Eleven.

On 18 May 2016, Wojcik moved on a season-long loan to United Soccer League side Oklahoma City Energy. He joined the club permanently on 10 January 2017.

After a season with National Premier Soccer League side New York Cosmos B, Wojcik joined USL club Hartford Athletic ahead of their inaugural 2019 season. He led the club in goals with seven, including the game-winning goal in three of the team's eight wins.

Wojcik signed with USL League One side Forward Madison on 14 January 2020.

On 1 June 2021, Wojcik became the third player to sign for National Independent Soccer Association side Chicago House AC ahead of the team's inaugural season.

== Honors ==
Indy Eleven
NASL Spring championship: 2016

New York Cosmos B
NPSL North Atlantic Conference

Regular season championship: 2018
Playoff championship: 2018
