= 2025 Westchester SC season =

Westchester SC
- Owner: Mitch Baruchowitz
- Head coach: Dave Carton
- Stadium: The Stadium at Memorial Field
- USL League One: 14th
- U.S. Open Cup: Third round
- USL Cup: Group stage
- USL Playoffs: DNQ
- Top goalscorer: League: (Honduras) Juan Obregón (15 goals); All: (Honduras) Juan Obregón (20 goals)
- Highest home attendance: 2,958 vs Portland Hearts of Pine August 24
- Lowest home attendance: 1,078 vs Greenville Triumph SC May 25
- Average home league attendance: 1,698, 1,763 With USL Cup, 1,779 With U.S. Open Cup and USL Cup
- Biggest win: Texoma FC 1–3 Westchester SC, March 29
- Biggest defeat: Westchester SC 1–4 Rhode Island FC April 27; Westchester SC 2–5 AV Alta FC June 14

The 2025 Westchester SC season was the inaugural season in the club's existence as well as their first in USL League One, the third-tier of American soccer. They also competed in the U.S. Open Cup and USL Cup.

== Current roster ==
As of August 29, 2025

Note: Flags indicate national team as defined under FIFA eligibility rules; some limited exceptions apply. Players may hold more than one non-FIFA nationality.

No.	Pos.	Nation	Player
1	GK	USA	Dane Jacomen (on loan from Loudoun United)}
4	DF	USA	Bobby Pierre
5	MF	LBR	Joel Johnson
6	MF	USA	Conor McGlynn
7	FW	TTO	Samory Powder
8	MF	AUS	Daniel Bouman
9	MF	NED	Koen Blommestijn
10	MF	NED	Dean Guezen
11	MF	ESA	Bryan Vásquez
12	DF	GHA	Rashid Tetteh
13	MF	USA	Andrew Hammersley
14	FW	NED	Mink Peeters
15	FW	LBR	Prince Saydee
17	FW	USA	Jonathan Bolanos
18	FW	USA	Ermin Mačkić
19	DF	USA	Josh Drack
20	MF	USA	Samuel Greenberg

No.	Pos.	Nation	Player
22	DF	USA	Stephen Payne
23	DF	COL	Juan Palma
24	GK	HON	Enrique Facussé
29	FW	HON	Juan Carlos Obregón
31	FW	JAM	Deshane Beckford
35	DF	HAI	Andrew Jean-Baptiste
64	DF	USA	Braeden Backus
66	DF	TTO	Noah Powder
68	MF	JPN	Taimu Okiyoshi
71	MF	USA	Christian Mancheno
92	DF	JAM	Kemar Lawrence
99	GK	CRC	Jose Millman

1. USL Academy Contract

== Transfers ==
=== In ===
Date	Position	Number	Name	from	Type	Fee	Ref.
December 12, 2024	DF	92	(Jamaica) Kemar Lawrence	(Romania) FC UTA Arad	Signing	NA	
December 23, 2024	MF	7	(Trinidad and Tobago) Samory Powder	(United States) Portland Pilots	Signing	NA	
December 23, 2024	MF	6	(United States) Conor McGlynn	(United States) Rhode Island FC	Signing	NA	
December 23, 2024	DF	22	(United States) Stephen Payne	(United States) Forward Madison FC	Signing	NA	
January 2, 2025	FW	9	(Netherlands) Koen Blommestijn	(Netherlands) FC Volendam	Signing	NA	
January 3, 2025	MF	8	(Australia) Daniel Bouman	(Australia) Marconi Stallions	Signing	NA	
January 3, 2025	MF	10	(Netherlands) Dean Diego Guezen	(Poland) Zagłębie Sosnowiec	Signing	NA	
January 21, 2025	DF	35	(Haiti) Andrew Jean-Baptiste	(Canada) Valour FC	Signing	NA	
January 21, 2025	DF	5	(Liberia) Joel Johnson	(United States) Charlotte Independence	Signing	NA	
January 21, 2025	MF	11	(El Salvador) Bryan Vásquez	(United States) FC Cincinnati 2	Signing	NA	
January 27, 2025	DF	4	(United States) Kurowskybob Pierre	(United States) Real Monarchs SLC	Signing	NA	
January 27, 2025	DF	66	(Trinidad and Tobago) Noah Powder	(United States) Northern Colorado Hailstorm FC	Signing	NA	
January 27, 2025	DF	12	(Ghana) Rashid Tetteh	(United States) FC Tulsa	Signing	NA	
January 29, 2025	GK	1	(United States) Dane Jacomen	(United States) Loudoun United	Loan	NA	
January 30, 2025	MF	17	(United States) Jonathan Bolanos	(United States) Huntsville City FC	Signing	NA	
January 30, 2025	FW	29	(Honduras) Juan Carlos Obregón	(United States) Charlotte Independence	Signing	NA	
January 30, 2025	MF	7	(Liberia) Prince Saydee	(United States) Charleston Battery	Signing	NA	
February 7, 2025	FW	18	(United States) Ermin Mackic	(Montenegro) FK Jezero	Signing	NA	
February 11, 2025	FW	14	(Netherlands) Mink Peeters	(Austria) SV Lafnitz	Signing	NA	
March 7, 2025	DF	2	(United States) Tobi Adewole	(Germany) Greifswalder FC	Signing	NA	
March 18, 2025	GK	13	(United States) Andrew Hammersley	(United States) Sacred Heart Pioneers	Signing	NA	
April 1, 2025	MF	20	(United States) Samuel Greenberg	(United States) Westchester SC Academy	Signing	NA	
May 2, 2025	DF	23	(Colombia) Juan Palma	(United States) Charleston Battery	Signing	NA	
May 16, 2025	DF	19	(United States) Josh Drack	(United States) Charleston Battery	Transfer	NA	
May 20, 2025	GK	99	(Costa Rica) Jose Millman	(United States) Westchester SC Academy	USL Academy Contract	NA	
May 20, 2025	MF	68	(Japan) Taimu Okiyoshi	(United States) Rhode Island FC	Loan	NA	
July 27, 2025	MF	71	(United States) Christian Mancheno	(United States) Westchester SC Academy	USL Academy Contract	NA	
August 1, 2025	DF	64	(United States) Braeden Backus	(United States) Westchester SC Academy	USL Academy Contract	NA	
August 26, 2025	GK	24	(Honduras) Enrique Facussé	(Honduras) Juticalpa	Loan	NA	
August 29, 2025	FW	31	(Jamaica) Deshane Beckford	(United States) Hartford Athletic	Loan	NA	

=== Out ===
Date	Position	Number	Name	to	Type	Fee	Ref.
September 10, 2025	DF	2	(United States) Tobi Adewole	(United States) Charlotte Independence	Transfer	Free	

=== Loan In ===
No.	Pos.	Player	Loaned from	Start	End	Source
1	GK	(United States) Dane Jacomen	(United States) Loudoun United	January 29, 2025	December 31, 2025	
68	MF	(Japan) Taimu Okiyoshi	(United States) Rhode Island FC	July 17, 2025	December 31, 2025	
24	GK	(Honduras) Enrique Facussé	(Honduras) Juticalpa	August 26, 2025	December 31, 2025	
31	FW	(Jamaica) Deshane Beckford	(United States) Hartford Athletic	August 29, 2025	December 31, 2025	

=== Loan Out ===
No.	Pos.	Player	Loaned from	Start	End	Source

== Friendlies ==
February 8 Preseason	Westchester SC	v	New Jersey Alliance FC	Mount Vernon, New York
9:30 am EST		Report		Stadium: The Stadium at Memorial Field

February 16 Preseason	New York Red Bulls II	3–4	Westchester SC	Montclair, New Jersey
1:00 pm EST	Trialist 4 4'; Trialist 3 12', 39'	Report	30'; 33'; 43'; 75'	Stadium: MSU Soccer Park at Pittser Field

February 22 Preseason	Philadelphia Union II	v	Westchester SC	Chester, Pennsylvania
		Report		Stadium: WSFS Bank Sportsplex

February 28 Preseason	New York City FC II	v	Westchester SC	Queens, New York
		Report		Stadium: Belson Stadium

== Competitions ==
=== USL League One ===
==== Table ====
Pos	Team	Pld	W	L	T	GF	GA	GD	Pts
10	Forward Madison FC	30	8	11	11	31	43	−12	35
11	Greenville Triumph SC	30	8	14	8	38	43	−5	32
12	Texoma FC	30	7	14	9	35	55	−20	30
13	Richmond Kickers	30	8	17	5	43	53	−10	29
14	Westchester SC	30	5	16	9	43	59	−16	24

Source: USL League One
Rules for classification: 1) points; 2) total wins; 3) total goal differential; 4) total goals scored; 5) points earned against top four finishers; 6) disciplinary points; 7) drawing of lots.

==== Matches ====
March 8 1	Greenville Triumph SC	1–1	Westchester SC	Greenville, South Carolina
4:00 PM EDT	Velásquez 31' (pen.); Bubb (yellow card) 64'; Wright (yellow card) 89'	Report	Obregón 14' (pen.); McGlynn (yellow card) 21'; Johnson (yellow card) 78'	Stadium: Paladin Stadium; Attendance: 2,032; Referee: Luis Arroyo

March 29 2	Texoma FC	1–3	Westchester SC	Sherman, Texas
8:00 PM EDT	McManus 4'; Chavez (yellow card) 55'; McCready (yellow card) 66'; Ramos (yellow card) 81'; Spengler (yellow card) 83' (yellow-red card) 90+4'	Report	McGlynn 31'; Adewole (yellow card) 45+5' (goal) 48'; Saydee (yellow card) 79'; Bolanos 85' (yellow card) 86'	Stadium: Historic Bearcat Stadium; Attendance: 1,367; Referee: Emmy Nonso-Ayakwo

April 5 3	AV Alta FC	2–0	Westchester SC	Lancaster, California
10:30 PM EDT	Alaribe 9'; Blancas (yellow card) 15'; Villalobos 27'; Lay (yellow card) 43'; Cruz (yellow card) 44'; Pajaro (yellow card) 73'; Acuña (yellow card) 83'	Report	Blommestijn (yellow card) 76'; Obregón (yellow card) 82'	Stadium: Lancaster Municipal Stadium; Attendance: 5,433; Referee: Trevor Wiseman

April 19 4	Richmond Kickers	4–4	Westchester SC	Richmond, Virginia
6:00 PM EDT	Espinal 2', 32'; Kirkland 63', 90+9'; Schenfeld (yellow card) 90'; França (yellow card) 90+4'; Barnathan (yellow card) 90+5'	Report	Powder 8' (yellow card) 72'; Payne (yellow card) 9'; Johnson (yellow card) 43'; Powder 53'; Blommestijn (yellow card) 70'; Bouman (yellow card) 77'; McGlynn 83'; Obregón 90+7' (pen.)	Stadium: City Stadium; Attendance: 5,082; Referee: Marie Durr

May 4 5	Spokane Velocity	3–1	Westchester SC	Spokane, Washington
7:00 PM EDT	Reedy 44'; Peláez (yellow card) 45+1' (goal) 49'; Jome 63'	Report	Powder 9' (yellow card) 77'; McGlynn (yellow card) 23'; Powder (yellow card) 42'; Jacomen (yellow card) 49'; Pierre (yellow card) 57'	Stadium: ONE Spokane Stadium; Attendance: 2,146; Referee: Mark Verso

May 10 6	Westchester SC	2–3	Charlotte Independence	Mount Vernon, New York
4:00 PM EDT	McGlynn 8'; Bolanos (yellow card) 35'; Obregón 40' (pen.); Johnson (yellow card) 50' (yellow-red card) 75'	Report	Sorenson (yellow card) 13'; Romero (yellow card) 37'; Spielman (yellow card) 53'; Marou 57', 73', 89'; Chaney (yellow card) 90+6'	Stadium: The Stadium at Memorial Field; Attendance: 1,738; Referee: Kyle Averil

May 17 7	Westchester SC	1–1	Forward Madison FC	Mount Vernon, New York
4:00 PM EDT	Obregón 17' (yellow card) 68'; Lawrence (yellow card) 44'; Drack (yellow card) 72'; Bouman (yellow card) 73'	Report	Gebhard 40' (pen.); Chilaka (yellow card) 45+1'; Boyce (yellow card) 55'; Carrera-García (yellow card) 89'	Stadium: The Stadium at Memorial Field; Attendance: 1,533; Referee: Alejo Calume

May 25 8	Westchester SC	2–2	Richmond Kickers	Mount Vernon, New York
2:00 PM EDT	Saydee 9'; McGlynn (yellow card) 24'; Obregón (yellow card) 24' (goal) 29'; Bolanos (yellow card) 63'; Bouman (yellow card) 68'; Johnson (yellow card) 87'; Mackic (yellow card) 90+9'	Report	Schenfeld (yellow card) 27'; Espinal 32'; Bolduc 47'; Cela (yellow card) 90+4'	Stadium: The Stadium at Memorial Field; Attendance: 1,390; Referee: Muhammad Hassan

June 7 9	Westchester SC	1–1	One Knoxville SC	Mount Vernon, New York
7:00 PM EDT	Johnson (yellow card) 59' (yellow-red card); Saydee 51'; Jean-Baptiste (yellow card) 66'	Report	Ritchie (red card) 44'; Johnson (yellow card) 67'; Tekiela 71' (pen.)	Stadium: The Stadium at Memorial Field; Attendance: 2,385; Referee: Deny Kulasinac

June 15 10	Westchester SC	2–5	AV Alta FC	Mount Vernon, New York
7:00 PM EDT	McGlynn 24'; Bolanos 25'; Guezen (yellow card) 42'; Pierre (yellow card) 83'; Obregón (yellow card) 86'; Aoumaich (yellow card) 90+7'	Report	Desdunes 38'; Cerritos (yellow card) 45+2'; Lay 52'; Alaribe 70'; Blancas 84' (pen.); Cruz 90+6'	Stadium: The Stadium at Memorial Field; Attendance: 2,492; Referee: Muhammad Kaleia

June 18 11	Forward Madison FC	1–2	Westchester SC	Madison, Wisconsin
8:00 PM EDT	McLaughlin 4' (pen.); Schipmann (yellow card) 45'; Mesias (yellow card) 65'; Mehl (yellow card) 87'	Report	Saydee 22'; Obregón 45+1'; Pierre (yellow card) 48'; Mackic (yellow card) 77'	Stadium: Breese Stevens Field; Attendance: 3,647; Referee: Greg Dopka

July 2 12	Westchester SC	0–3	Greenville Triumph SC	Mount Vernon, New York
7:00 PM EDT	Palma (yellow card) 41'	Report	Robles 9', 43' (pen.); Herrera 15' (pen.) (yellow card) 32' (yellow-red card) 69'; Gonzalez (yellow card) 58'; Sims (yellow card) 66'; Fricke (yellow card) 69'; Wright (yellow card) 70'	Stadium: The Stadium at Memorial Field; Attendance: 1,078; Referee: Elvis Osmanovic

July 12 13	FC Naples	2–1	Westchester SC	Naples, Florida
8:00 PM EDT	Delgado (yellow card) 12'; Onen 33' (yellow card) 73'; Henderlong 83'	Report	Obregón 14' (pen.) (yellow card) 73'; Bolanos (yellow card) 32'; Mackic (yellow card) 35'; Guezen (yellow card) 72'; Palma (yellow card) 85'	Stadium: Paradise Coast Sports Complex; Attendance: 2,974; Referee: John Griggs

July 16 14	Westchester SC	3–0	Spokane Velocity	Mount Vernon, New York
7:00 PM EDT	Mackic 22'; Payne (yellow card) 64'; Obregón 66'; Tetteh (yellow card) 85'; Palma (yellow card) 90+2'	Report	Peláez 14' (pen.), 70' (pen.); Jacomen 48' (o.g.)	Stadium: The Stadium at Memorial Field; Referee: Joe Surgan
Note: Match was a 3-0 forfeit because Spokane used an inelligble player.

July 19 15	One Knoxville SC	1–1	Westchester SC	Knoxville, Tennessee
7:00 PM EDT	Diene 2'; Fernandez (yellow card) 46'; Skelton (yellow card) 89'	Report	Guezen (yellow card) 9'; Obregón 16'; Bouman (yellow card) 28'; Okiyoshi (yellow card) 71'; Johnson (yellow card) 90+6'	Stadium: Covenant Health Park; Attendance: 5,420; Referee: Mark Verso

August 1 16	Westchester SC	1–3	Chattanooga Red Wolves SC	Mount Vernon, New York
7:00 PM EDT	Guezen (yellow card) 14'; Tetteh (yellow card) 20'; Obregón 58'; Palma (yellow card) 64'	Report	Ualefi 6'; Mercer (yellow card) 52'; Ayimbila 74'; Hernandez (yellow card) 90+3' (goal) 90+5'	Stadium: The Stadium at Memorial Field; Attendance: 1,572; Referee: Kyle Johnston

August 6 17	Union Omaha	2–1	Westchester SC	Papillion, Nebraska
8:00 PM EDT	Becher 83'; Schneider (yellow card) 90+5'; Okiyoshi 90+6' (o.g.)	Report	Palma (yellow card) 36'; Saydee 52'; Pierre (yellow card) 90+2'	Stadium: Werner Park; Attendance: 2,021; Referee: Alex Beehler

August 10 18	Westchester SC	3–3	South Georgia Tormenta FC	Mount Vernon, New York
7:00 PM EDT	Drack (yellow card) 25'; Powder 33'; Guezen 50'; Obregón 90+1' (pen.)	Report	Tunbridge 27', 61' (pen.); Bazini 56'; Pack (yellow card) 82'; (yellow card) 90+6'	Stadium: The Stadium at Memorial Field; Attendance: 1,508; Referee: Rodrigo Albuquerque

August 15 19	Charlotte Independence	1–0	Westchester SC	Charlotte, North Carolina
7:00 PM EDT	Chaney 20'; Speilman (yellow card) 69'; Ndiaye (yellow card) 70'; Dimick (yellow card) 79'; Romero (yellow card) 90+7'	Report	Okiyoshi (yellow card) 58'; Johnson (yellow card) 81'	Stadium: American Legion Memorial Stadium; Attendance: 643; Referee: Elton García

August 24 20	Westchester SC	2–3	Portland Hearts of Pine	Mount Vernon, New York
7:00 PM EDT	Drack (yellow card) 1' (yellow-red card) 72'; Mackic 16'; Saydee 45'; Payne (yellow card) 54'; Powder (yellow card) 56'; Palma (yellow card) 64'; Bouman (yellow card) 83'	Report	Lopez (yellow card) 13'; Washington 26'; Wright 36'; Messer 43' (yellow card) 75'; Wada (yellow card) 63'; Vinberg (yellow card) 78'; Morse (yellow card) 90+6'	Stadium: The Stadium at Memorial Field; Attendance: 2,958; Referee: Ryan Farrell

August 30 21	FC Naples	2–2	Westchester SC	Naples, Florida
7:00 PM EDT	Henderlong 14', 23'; Onen (yellow card) 67'	Report	Obregón 4'; Pierre (yellow card) 41'; Saydee (yellow card) 45'; Palma (yellow card) 45+6'; Bouman 49'; Guezen (yellow card) 62'; Bolanos (yellow card) 89'	Stadium: Paradise Coast Sports Complex; Attendance: 2,742; Referee: Carlos Rodriguez

September 3 22	Westchester SC	0–2	Richmond Kickers	Mount Vernon, New York
7:00 PM EDT	Mackic (yellow card) 28'; Facussé (yellow card) 60'; Guezen (yellow card) 73'; Johnson (yellow card) 90+4'	Report	Terzaghi 8'; Espinal (yellow card) 33'; Johnson 45+1'; Anderson (yellow card) 90+3'	Stadium: The Stadium at Memorial Field; Attendance: 1,236; Referee: Izlen Peksenar

September 7 23	Spokane Velocity	2–1	Westchester SC	Spokane, Washington
7:00 PM EDT	Lewis 40'; Crisler 59'; Waldeck (yellow card) 66'	Report	Pierre (yellow card) 4'; Obregón 36'; Palma (yellow card) 45+3'; Okiyoshi (yellow card) 64'; Bouman (yellow card) 90+4'	Stadium: ONE Spokane Stadium; Attendance: 2,295; Referee: Corbyn May

September 13 24	Westchester SC	1–2	Union Omaha	Mount Vernon, New York
7:00 PM EDT	Obregón 9'; Bolanos (yellow card) 32'; Payne (yellow card) 79'; McGlynn (yellow card) 82'	Report	Faz 15' (yellow card) 90+3' (yellow-red card); Knapp (yellow card) 36'; Bronnik 45+3'; Becher (yellow card) 70'; Schneider (yellow card) 80'	Stadium: The Stadium at Memorial Field; Attendance: 1,381; Referee: Russell Miller

September 21 25	Westchester SC	2–1	Texoma FC	Mount Vernon, New York
7:00 PM EDT	Bolanos (yellow card) 50'; Palma (yellow card) 54'; Obregón (yellow card) 65' (goal) 83'; Tetteh 67'; Facussé (yellow card) 90+7'	Report	Chavez (yellow card) 21'; McCormick (yellow card) 31'; Valentine 51'; Ramos (yellow card) 68'	Stadium: The Stadium at Memorial Field; Attendance: 1,192; Referee: Elvis Osmanovic

September 28 26	Westchester SC	0–1	Forward Madison FC	Mount Vernon, New York
7:00 PM EDT	Palma (yellow card) 36'; Obregón (yellow card) 56'; Pierre (yellow card) 59'	Report	Gebhard 2'; Mesias (yellow card) 29'; Murphy (yellow card) 55'; Glaeser (yellow card) 58'	Stadium: The Stadium at Memorial Field; Attendance: 1,190; Referee: Stephen Foster

October 3 27	South Georgia Tormenta FC	3–1	Westchester SC	Statesboro, Georgia
7:00 PM EDT	Reid-Stephen 11', 46'; Doyle 42'; Alves (yellow card) 75'	Report	Guezen 20'; Powder (yellow card) 52'; Pierre (yellow card) 68'	Stadium: Tormenta Stadium; Attendance: 755; Referee: Lauren Aldrich

October 12 28	Westchester SC	2–0	FC Naples	Mount Vernon, New York
2:00 PM EDT	Palma (yellow card) 11'; Evans 64' (o.g.); Obregón 74'	Report	Dengler (yellow card) 49'; Heckenberg (yellow card) 86'	Stadium: The Stadium at Memorial Field; Attendance: 2,121; Referee: Benjamin Meyer

October 18 29	Portland Hearts of Pine	2–2	Westchester SC	Portland, Maine
5:00 PM EDT	O. Wright 47' (pen.); Green (yellow card) 62'; Murphy (yellow card) 68'; Wada 75'	Report	Drack (yellow card) 46'; Carton (yellow card) 50'; Obregón 72', 90' (yellow card) 90+2'; Bouman (yellow card) 77'	Stadium: Fitzpatrick Stadium; Attendance: 5,856; Referee: Amin Hadzic

October 25 30	Chattanooga Red Wolves SC	2–1	Westchester SC	East Ridge, Tennessee
7:00 PM EDT	Ayimbila (yellow card) 11'; Hernández 17'; Watters (yellow card) 45'; Bentley 73'	Report	Pierre (yellow card) 21' (goal) 32'	Stadium: CHI Memorial Stadium; Attendance: 2,175; Referee: Dion Coxe-Trieger

=== US Open Cup ===
March 18 First Round	FC Motown	0–1	Westchester SC	Montclair, New Jersey
7:30 PM EDT	Bermudez (yellow card) 22'; Speed (yellow card) 59'	Report	Obregón (yellow card) 74' (goal) 81' (pen.); Payne (yellow card) 90+4'	Stadium: MSU Soccer Park at Pittser Field; Attendance: 534; Referee: Caleb Firl

April 2 Second Round	Westchester SC	3–2	New York Pancyprian-Freedoms	Mount Vernon, New York
7:00 PM EDT	Obregón 3' (yellow card) 55'; Powder (yellow card) 19'; Sluys 22' (o.g.); Bouman 34'	Report	Argudo (yellow card) 27'; Martín 54'; Thristino 90+1'	Stadium: The Stadium at Memorial Field; Attendance: 2,026

April 16 Third Round	Detroit City FC	3–1	Westchester SC	Hamtramck, Michigan
7:00 PM EDT	Polisi (yellow card) 39'; Gasso (yellow card) 55'; Doner 71'; Cedeno 85' (pen.); Smith 90+4'	Report	Pierre (yellow card) 13'; Adewole (yellow card) 58'; Obregón 76'; Johnson (yellow card) 79'	Stadium: Keyworth Stadium; Attendance: 2,079; Referee: Edson Carvajal

=== USL Cup ===
==== Table ====
Pos	Lg	Team	Pld	W	PKW	PKL	L	GF	GA	GD	Pts	Qualification
1	USLC	Rhode Island FC	4	3	0	1	0	11	4	+7	10	Advance to knockout stage
2	USLC	Hartford Athletic	4	2	1	1	0	9	6	+3	9	Advance to knockout stage (wild card)
3	USLC	Detroit City FC	4	2	1	0	1	8	6	+2	8	
4	USL1	Portland Hearts of Pine	4	1	1	0	2	7	10	−3	5	
5	USLC	Pittsburgh Riverhounds SC	4	1	0	1	2	3	4	−1	4	
6	USL1	Westchester SC	4	0	0	0	4	3	11	−8	0	

Updated to match(es) played on July 26, 2025. Source: USL

==== Matches ====
April 27 Group Stage	Westchester SC	1–4	Rhode Island FC	Mount Vernon, New York
2:00 PM EDT	Bouman (yellow card) 34'; Blommestijn (yellow card) 56'; Bolanos 85'	Report	Nodarse 25'; Williams 28', 65'; Rodriguez 37'	Stadium: The Stadium at Memorial Field; Attendance: 2,783; Referee: Joe Surgan

May 31 Group Stage	Westchester SC	2–3	Hartford Athletic	Mount Vernon, New York
4:00 PM EDT	Obregón 24' (pen.), 56' (pen.); Jean-Baptiste (yellow card) 83'; Bolanos (yellow card) 90+2'; Blommestijn (yellow card) 90+4'	Report	Siaha (yellow card) 23'; Careaga 51', 75'; Anderson (yellow card) 53'; Farrell (yellow card) 55'; Dieng (yellow card) 68' (goal) 88'	Stadium: The Stadium at Memorial Field; Attendance: 1,653; Referee: Drew Klemp

June 28 Group Stage	Pittsburgh Riverhounds SC	1–0	Westchester SC	Pittsburgh, Pennsylvania
7:00 PM EDT	Jacquesson 15'; Suber (yellow card) 48'	Report	Peeters (yellow card) 71'; Mackic (yellow card) 90+6'	Stadium: Highmark Stadium; Attendance: 4,752; Referee: Marie Durr

July 26 Group Stage	Detroit City FC	3–0	Westchester SC	Hamtramck, Michigan
7:00 PM EDT	Rh. Williams (yellow card) 11'; Ry. Williams (yellow card) 28'; Diouf 45+3' (pen.); Wiedt (yellow card) 45+5'; Amoo-Mensah 71'; Yamazaki (yellow card) 81'; Sheldon 89'	Report	Powder (yellow card) 16' (yellow-red card) 45+6'; Palma (yellow card) 25'; Obregón (yellow card) 45+2'; Hammersley (yellow card) 56'	Stadium: Keyworth Stadium; Attendance: 6,954; Referee: Atahan Yaya

=== Appearances and goals ===
No.	Pos	Nat	Player	Total		USL League One		Lamar Hunt US Open Cup		USL Cup		USL League One Playoffs	
No.	Pos	Nat	Player	Apps	Goals	Apps	Goals	Apps	Goals	Apps	Goals	Apps	Goals
1	GK	(United States) USA	Dane Jacomen	16	0	11+0	0	3+0	0	2+0	0	0+0	0
2	DF	(United States) USA	Tobi Adewole	9	1	5+0	1	1+2	0	1+0	0	0+0	0
3	MF	(Liberia) LBR	Prince Saydee	31	5	17+8	5	2+0	0	2+2	0	0+0	0
4	DF	(United States) USA	Kurowskybob Pierre	28	1	12+11	1	2+0	0	3+0	0	0+0	0
5	DF	(Liberia) LBR	Joel Johnson	31	0	22+3	0	2+0	0	4+0	0	0+0	0
6	MF	(United States) USA	Conor McGlynn	25	4	16+4	4	3+0	0	2+0	0	0+0	0
7	MF	(Trinidad and Tobago) TTO	Samory Powder	29	2	10+14	2	1+2	0	1+1	0	0+0	0
8	MF	(Australia) AUS	Daniel Bouman	33	2	14+14	1	2+0	1	3+0	0	0+0	0
9	FW	(Netherlands) NED	Koen Blommestijn	10	0	1+4	0	1+2	0	1+1	0	0+0	0
10	MF	(Netherlands) NED	Dean Diego Guezen	28	2	20+5	2	0+0	0	2+1	0	0+0	0
11	MF	(El Salvador) ESA	Bryan Vásquez	6	0	0+2	0	0+2	0	1+1	0	0+0	0
12	DF	(Ghana) GHA	Rashid Tetteh	24	1	18+3	1	1+0	0	2+0	0	0+0	0
13	GK	(United States) USA	Andrew Hammersley	11	0	9+0	0	0+0	0	2+0	0	0+0	0
14	FW	(Netherlands) NED	Mink Peeters	7	0	1+3	0	1+1	0	0+1	0	0+0	0
17	MF	(United States) USA	Jonathan Bolanos	33	3	20+7	2	2+0	0	2+2	1	0+0	0
18	FW	(United States) USA	Ermin Mackic	28	1	6+15	1	1+2	0	1+3	0	0+0	0
19	DF	(United States) USA	Josh Drack	23	0	21+0	0	0+0	0	2+0	0	0+0	0
20	MF	(United States) USA	Samuel Greenberg	1	0	0+1	0	0+0	0	0+0	0	0+0	0
22	DF	(United States) USA	Stephen Payne	32	0	21+5	0	3+0	0	3+0	0	0+0	0
23	DF	(Colombia) COL	Juan Palma	21	0	16+3	0	0+0	0	2+0	0	0+0	0
24	GK	(Honduras) HON	Enrique Facussé	9	0	9+0	0	0+0	0	0+0	0	0+0	0
29	FW	(Honduras) HON	Juan Carlos Obregón	36	22	29+0	17	3+0	3	4+0	2	0+0	0
31	MF	(Jamaica) JAM	Deshane Beckford	10	0	8+2	0	0+0	0	0+0	0	0+0	0
35	DF	(Haiti) HAI	Andrew Jean-Baptiste	17	0	5+9	0	1+0	0	0+2	0	0+0	0
64	DF	(United States) USA	Braeden Backus	0	0	0+0	0	0+0	0	0+0	0	0+0	0
66	DF	(Trinidad and Tobago) TTO	Noah Powder	28	2	17+5	2	2+1	0	2+1	0	0+0	0
68	DF	(Japan) JPN	Taimu Okiyoshi	12	0	8+3	0	0+0	0	1+0	0	0+0	0
71	MF	(United States) USA	Cristian Mancheno	1	0	0+0	0	0+0	0	0+1	0	0+0	0
92	DF	(Jamaica) JAM	Kemar Lawrence	9	0	4+2	0	2+0	0	1+0	0	0+0	0
99	GK	(Costa Rica) CRC	Jose Millman	0	0	0+0	0	0+0	0	0+0	0	0+0	0

=== Top goalscorers ===
Rank	Position	Number	Name	USL1 Season	U.S. Open Cup	USL Cup	USL League One Playoffs	Total
1	FW	29	(Honduras) Juan Carlos Obregón	17	3	2	0	22
2	MF	3	(Liberia) Prince Saydee	5	0	0	0	5
3	MF	6	(United States) Conor McGlynn	4	0	0	0	4
4	MF	17	(United States) Jonathan Bolanos	2	0	1	0	3
5	MF	7	(Trinidad and Tobago) Samory Powder	2	0	0	0	2
5	DF	66	(Trinidad and Tobago) Noah Powder	2	0	0	0	2
5	MF	8	(Australia) Daniel Bouman	1	1	0	0	2
5			Own Goal	1	1	0	0	1
9	DF	2	(United States) Tobi Adewole	1	0	0	0	1
9	DF	2	(Haiti) Bobby Pierre	1	0	0	0	1
9	MF	10	(Netherlands) Dean Guezen	1	0	0	0	1
9	DF	12	(Ghana) Rashid Tetteh	1	0	0	0	1
9	FW	18	(United States) Ermin Mackic	1	0	0	0	1
9			Forfeited Goals	3	0	0	0	3
Total				42	5	3	0	50

=== Assist scorers ===
Rank	Position	Number	Name	USL1 Season	U.S. Open Cup	USL Cup	USL League One Playoffs	Total
1	DF	66	(Trinidad and Tobago) Noah Powder	4	1	0	0	5
2	MF	3	(Liberia) Prince Saydee	3	0	0	0	3
2	DF	5	(Liberia) Joel Johnson	3	0	0	0	3
2	MF	10	(Netherlands) Dean Diego Guezen	3	0	0	0	3
5	MF	6	(United States) Conor McGlynn	2	0	0	0	2
5	FW	18	(United States) Ermin Mackic	2	0	0	0	2
5	FW	29	(Honduras) Juan Carlos Obregón	2	0	0	0	2
5	MF	31	(Jamaica) Deshane Beckford	2	0	0	0	2
9	MF	7	(Trinidad and Tobago) Samory Powder	1	0	0	0	1
9	DF	12	(Ghana) Rashid Tetteh	1	0	0	0	1
9	MF	17	(United States) Jonathan Bolanos	1	0	0	0	1
9	DF	19	(United States) Josh Drack	1	0	0	0	1
9	DF	22	(United States) Stephen Payne	1	0	0	0	1
9	DF	92	(Jamaica) Kemar Lawrence	0	1	0	0	1
Total				26	2	0	0	28

=== Clean sheets ===
Rank	Name	USL1 Season	U.S. Open Cup	USL Cup	Total
1	(United States) Dane Jacomen	0	1	0	1

=== Disciplinary record ===
No.	Pos.	Player	USL League One Regular Season			Lamar Hunt US Open Cup			USL Cup			USL League One Playoffs			Total		
No.	Pos.	Player	Yellow card	(yellow card) (yellow-red card)	Red card	Yellow card	(yellow card) (yellow-red card)	Red card	Yellow card	(yellow card) (yellow-red card)	Red card	Yellow card	(yellow card) (yellow-red card)	Red card	Yellow card	(yellow card) (yellow-red card)	Red card
1	GK	(United States) Dane Jacomen	1	0	0	0	0	0	0	0	0	0	0	0	1	0	0
2	DF	(United States) Tobi Adewole	1	0	0	1	0	0	0	0	0	0	0	0	2	0	0
3	MF	(Liberia) Prince Saydee	2	0	0	0	0	0	0	0	0	0	0	0	2	0	0
4	DF	(United States) Kurowskybob Pierre	9	0	0	1	0	0	0	0	0	0	0	0	10	0	0
5	DF	(Liberia) Joel Johnson	9	2	0	1	0	0	0	0	0	0	0	0	10	2	0
6	MF	(United States) Conor McGlynn	4	0	0	0	0	0	0	0	0	0	0	0	4	0	0
7	MF	(Trinidad and Tobago) Samory Powder	1	0	0	0	0	0	0	0	0	0	0	0	1	0	0
8	FW	(Australia) Daniel Bouman	7	0	0	0	0	0	1	0	0	0	0	0	8	0	0
9	MF	(Netherlands) Koen Blommestijn	2	0	0	0	0	0	2	0	0	0	0	0	4	0	0
10	MF	(Netherlands) Dean Diego Guezen	6	0	0	0	0	0	0	0	0	0	0	0	6	0	0
11	MF	(El Salvador) Bryan Vásquez	0	0	0	0	0	0	0	0	0	0	0	0	0	0	0
12	DF	(Ghana) Rashid Tetteh	1	0	0	0	0	0	0	0	0	0	0	0	1	0	0
13	GK	(United States) Andrew Hammersley	0	0	0	0	0	0	1	0	0	0	0	0	1	0	0
14	FW	(Netherlands) Mink Peeters	0	0	0	0	0	0	1	0	0	0	0	0	1	0	0
17	MF	(United States) Jonathan Bolanos	7	0	0	0	0	0	1	0	0	0	0	0	8	0	0
18	FW	(United States) Ermin Mackic	4	0	0	0	0	0	1	0	0	0	0	0	5	0	0
19	DF	(United States) Josh Drack	5	1	0	0	0	0	0	0	0	0	0	0	5	1	0
20	MF	(United States) Samuel Greenberg	0	0	0	0	0	0	0	0	0	0	0	0	0	0	0
22	DF	(United States) Stephen Payne	3	0	0	1	0	0	0	0	0	0	0	0	4	0	0
23	DF	(Colombia) Juan Palma	11	0	0	0	0	0	1	0	0	0	0	0	12	0	0
24	GK	(Honduras) Enrique Facussé	2	0	0	0	0	0	0	0	0	0	0	0	2	0	0
29	FW	(Honduras) Juan Carlos Obregón	8	0	0	1	0	0	1	0	0	0	0	0	10	0	0
35	DF	(Haiti) Andrew Jean-Baptiste	1	0	0	0	0	0	1	0	0	0	0	0	2	0	0
64	DF	(United States) Braeden Backus	0	0	0	0	0	0	0	0	0	0	0	0	0	0	0
66	DF	(Trinidad and Tobago) Noah Powder	4	0	0	0	0	0	2	1	0	0	0	0	6	1	0
68	DF	(Japan) Taimu Okiyoshi	3	0	0	0	0	0	0	0	0	0	0	0	3	0	0
71	MF	(United States) Christian Mancheno	0	0	0	0	0	0	0	0	0	0	0	0	0	0	0
92	DF	(Jamaica) Kemar Lawrence	1	0	0	0	0	0	0	0	0	0	0	0	1	0	0
99	GK	(Costa Rica) Jose Millman	0	0	0	0	0	0	0	0	0	0	0	0	0	0	0
	Head Coach	(Republic of Ireland) Dave Carton	1	0	0	0	0	0	0	0	0	0	0	0	1	0	0
Total			85	3	0	6	0	0	12	1	0	0	0	0	103	4	0

== Awards and honors ==
=== USL League One Annual Awards ===
==== USL League One All League Honorees ====
Player	Team	Position	Ref
(Honduras) Juan Carlos Obregón	First	FW	

==== USL League One Player of the Year ====
Player	Position	Ref
(Honduras) Juan Carlos Obregón	FW	

==== USL League One Golden Boot ====
Player	Position	Ref
(Honduras) Juan Carlos Obregón	FW	

=== USL League One Player of the Week ===
Week	Player	Opponent	Position	Ref
7	(Trinidad and Tobago) Noah Powder	Richmond Kickers	MF	
33	(Honduras) Juan Carlos Obregón	Portland Hearts of Pine	FW	

=== USL League One Team of the Week ===
Week	Player	Opponent	Position	Ref
1	(United States) Tobi Adewole	Greenville Triumph SC	DF	
1	(Honduras) Juan Carlos Obregón	Greenville Triumph SC	FW	
4	(United States) Tobi Adewole	Texoma FC	DF	
4	(United States) Jonathan Bolanos	Texoma FC	MF	
4	(Trinidad and Tobago) Noah Powder	Texoma FC	Bench	
4	(United States) Conor McGlynn	Texoma FC	Bench	
4	(Honduras) Juan Carlos Obregón	Texoma FC	Bench	
7	(Trinidad and Tobago) Samory Powder	Richmond Kickers	DF	
7	(Trinidad and Tobago) Noah Powder	Richmond Kickers	MF	
7	(Honduras) Juan Carlos Obregón	Richmond Kickers	FW	
10	(United States) Conor McGlynn	Charlotte Independence	MF	
10	(Honduras) Juan Carlos Obregón	Charlotte Independence	FW	
11	(United States) Andrew Hammersley	Forward Madison FC	GK	
12	(Honduras) Juan Carlos Obregón	Charlotte Independence	FW	
14	(United States) Josh Drack	One Knoxville SC	DF	
14	(Liberia) Prince Saydee	One Knoxville SC	MF	
15	(Netherlands) Dean Guezen	AV Alta FC	MF	
16	(Liberia) Prince Saydee	Forward Madison FC	MF	
16	(Honduras) Juan Carlos Obregón	Charlotte Independence	FW	
16	(Republic of Ireland) Dave Carton	Forward Madison FC	Coach	
19	(Honduras) Juan Carlos Obregón	FC Naples	Bench	
21/22	(Honduras) Juan Carlos Obregón	Chattanooga Red Wolves SC	Bench	
23	(Honduras) Juan Carlos Obregón	South Georgia Tormenta FC	Bench	
26	(Honduras) Juan Carlos Obregón	FC Naples	Bench	
27	(United States) Bobby Pierre	Richmond Kickers and Spokane Velocity	DF	
28	(Honduras) Juan Carlos Obregón	Union Omaha	Bench	
28	(Ghana) Rashid Tetteh	Texoma FC	DF	
31	(Netherlands) Dean Guezen	South Georgia Tormenta FC	Bench	
32	(Liberia) Joel Johnson	FC Naples	MF	
32	(Honduras) Juan Carlos Obregón	FC Naples	Bench	
33	(Honduras) Juan Carlos Obregón	Portland Hearts of Pine	FW	
33	(United States) Bobby Pierre	Portland Hearts of Pine	DF	

=== USL Jägermeister Cup Team of the Round ===
Matchday	Player	Opponent	Position	Ref
2	(Honduras) Juan Carlos Obregón	Hartford Athletic	FW	

=== USL League One Goal of the Week ===
Matchday	Player	Opponent	Ref
11	(Honduras) Juan Carlos Obregón	Forward Madison FC	
27	(Honduras) Juan Carlos Obregón	Spokane Velocity FC	
33	(Honduras) Juan Carlos Obregón	Portland Hearts of Pine	

=== USL League One Save of the Week ===
Matchday	Player	Opponent	Ref
10	(United States) Andrew Hammersley	Charlotte Independence	
