= 2025 Detroit City FC season =

American soccer team season

Detroit City FC
2025 season
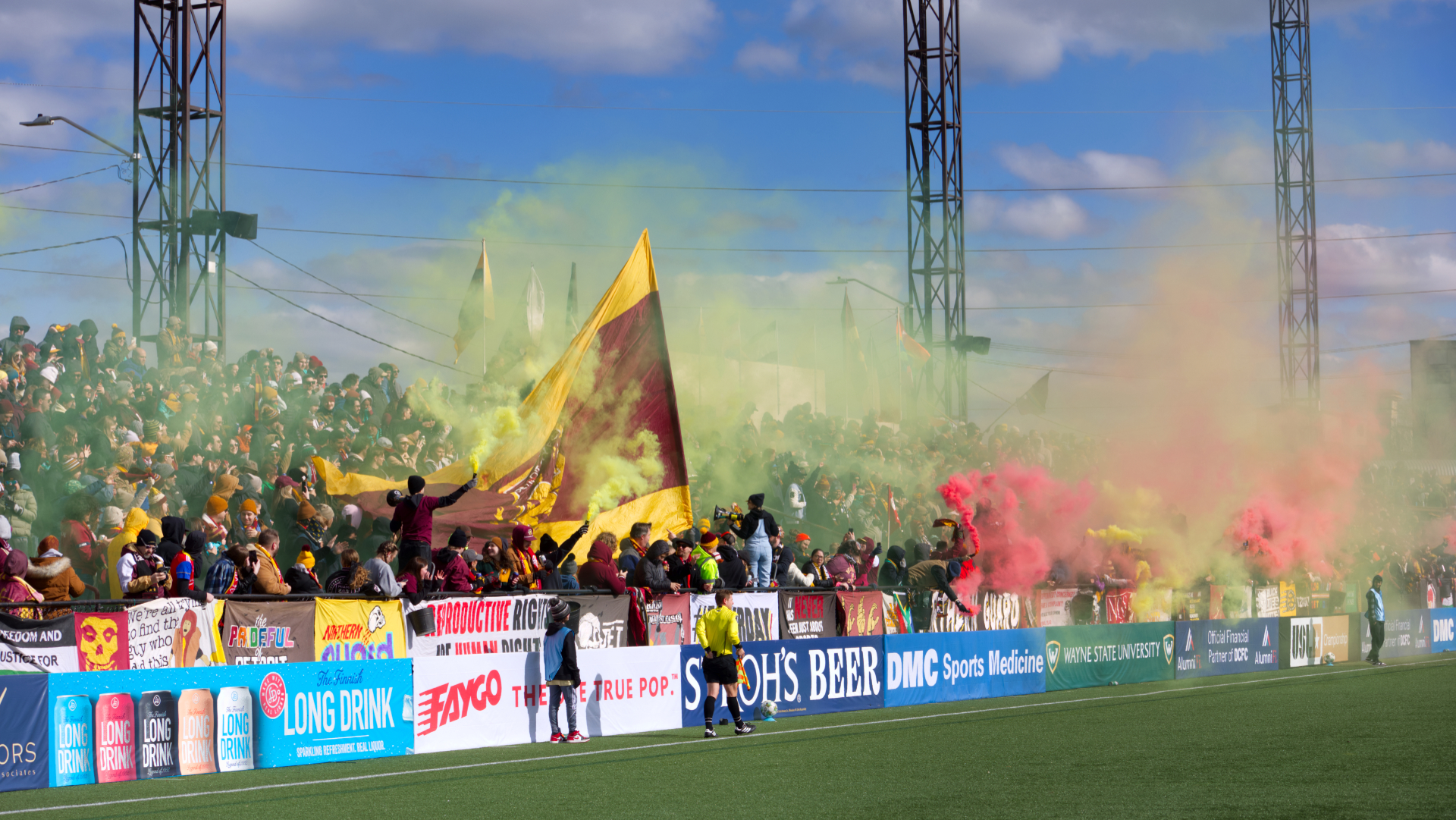
- Detroit City FC Northern Guard Supporters at Keyworth Stadium for the March 22, 2025 home opener
- CEO: Sean Mann
- Manager: Danny Dichio
- Stadium: Keyworth Stadium; Hamtramck, Michigan
- USL Championship: 8th (Eastern Conference)
- USL Championship Playoffs: Conference Semifinals
- U.S. Open Cup: Round of 32
- USL Cup: Group Stage
- Top goalscorer: League: 10 goals: Darren Smith; All: 13 goals: Darren Smith
- Highest home attendance: 7,235 vs Pittsburgh Riverhounds (July 19)
- Lowest home attendance: 5,047 vs Monterey Bay FC (April 5)
- Average home league attendance: 6,229
- Biggest win: 4-1 vs Orange County SC (September 6)
- Biggest defeat: 4-0 at New Mexico United (September 10)
Home colors	Away colors	Third colors

The 2025 Detroit City FC season was the club's seventh professional season since the club was established in 2012, and the team's fourth season in the USL Championship.

== Kits ==
Home	Away	Third	Pride for Ruth Ellis Center	Charity for Michigan Immigrant Rights Center

== Roster ==
Final 2025 roster

Note: Flags indicate national team as defined under FIFA eligibility rules; some limited exceptions apply. Players may hold more than one non-FIFA nationality.

No.	Pos.	Nation	Player
2	DF	USA	Rhys Williams
3	DF	USA	Alex Villanueva
4	DF	USA	Shane Wiedt
5	DF	IRL	Stephen Carroll
6	MF	CAN	Jay Chapman
7	FW	RSA	Darren Smith
8	MF	SEN	Abdoulaye Diop
9	FW	ENG	Ben Morris
10	FW	ECU	Jeciel Cedeño
11	FW	USA	Connor Rutz
12	MF	USA	Michael Bryant
13	DF	USA	Matt Sheldon
14	MF	JPN	Haruki Yamazaki
16	GK	ZIM	Tatenda Mkuruva

No.	Pos.	Nation	Player
21	GK	MEX	Carlos Herrera
22	MF	USA	Kobe Hernandez-Foster
23	MF	URU	Sebastián Guenzatti
24	MF	USA	Dominic Gasso
27	MF	USA	Zain Elder
30	DF	USA	Devon Amoo-Mensah
32	FW	SEN	Ates Diouf (on loan from Lexington SC)
33	DF	USA	Isaiah LeFlore (on loan from Philadelphia Union)
39	MF	ENG	Ryan Williams
45	MF	CAN	Marcello Polisi
66	MF	USA	Bilal Obeid
91	GK	MEX	Carlos Saldaña
99	FW	USA	Jordan Adebayo-Smith (on loan from Minnesota United)

1. USL Academy Contract

== Coaching staff ==
Technical staff
Head Coach	(England) Danny Dichio
Assistant Coach	Vacant
Sports Performance Coach	(United States) Elisa Baeron
Goalkeeper Coach	(United States) Emerson Lovato

== Transfers ==
For transfers in, dates listed are when Detroit City FC officially signed the players to the roster. Transactions where only the rights to the players are acquired are not listed. For transfers out, dates listed are when Detroit City FC officially removed the players from its roster, not when they signed with another club. If a player later signed with another club, his new club will be noted, but the date listed here remains the one when he was officially removed from the Detroit City FC roster.

=== In ===
No.	Pos.	Player	Transferred from	Fee/notes	Date	Source
4	DF	(United States) Shane Wiedt	(United States) Sacramento Republic FC		December 5, 2024	
33	DF	(Canada) Morey Doner	(United States) Monterey Bay FC	Undisclosed fee	December 6, 2024	
21	GK	(Mexico) Carlos Herrera	(United States) Monterey Bay FC		December 10, 2024	
45	MF	(Canada) Marcello Polisi	(Canada) Valour FC		January 28, 2025	
7	FW	(South Africa) Darren Smith	(Finland) FC Inter Turku		January 29, 2025	
14	MF	(Japan) Haruki Yamazaki	(United States) Northern Colorado Hailstorm FC		January 30, 2025	
6	MF	(Canada) Jay Chapman	(United States) Hartford Athletic	Undisclosed fee	February 3, 2025	
32	FW	(Senegal) Ates Diouf	(United States) Lexington SC	Loan	February 20, 2025	
99	FW	(United States) Jordan Adebayo-Smith	(United States) Minnesota United FC	Loan	March 14, 2025	
16	GK	(Zimbabwe) Tatenda Mkuruva	(United States) Michigan Stars FC		March 25, 2025	
22	MF	(United States) Kobe Hernandez-Foster	(United States) Las Vegas Lights FC	Undisclosed fee	July 30, 2025	
33	DF	(United States) Isaiah LeFlore	(United States) Philadelphia Union	Loan	August 29, 2025	

=== Out ===
No.	Pos.	Player	Transferred to	Fee/notes	Date	Source
33	DF	(Canada) Morey Doner	(United States) Oakland Roots SC	Undisclosed fee	May 30, 2025	

== Competitions ==
=== Preseason and friendlies ===
February 5	Georgetown College	0–8	Detroit City FC	Lexington, KY
1:00 PM EST		Report	Fernandes 16'; Smith 28' 41'; (Unnamed) 46'; Cedeño 56' 74' 85'; Gourdie 79'

February 8	Lexington SC	1–0	Detroit City FC	Lexington, KY
1:00 PM EST	Goldthorp (2nd half)	Report		Stadium: Lexington Sporting Club Athletic Complex

February 13	Barça Academy U19	0–5	Detroit City FC	Tucson, AZ
3:00 PM EST		Report	Smith 14'; Villanueva 25'; (Own Goal) 34' (o.g.); Morris 40'; (Unnamed) 80'

February 15	Pima Community College	1–4	Detroit City FC	Tucson, AZ
3:00 PM EST		Report	Guenzatti 25'; Sheldon 29'; Smith 40'; Chapman 80'

February 17	Phoenix College	1–8	Detroit City FC	Tucson, AZ
3:00 PM EST		Report	Morris 29' 34'; Chapman 55'; Sheldon 70'; Guenzatti 78' 85'; (Unnamed) 86'; Carroll 88'

February 23	Detroit City FC	3–2	Toronto FC II	Brighton, MI
8:15 PM EST	Smith 5'; Morris 18'; Bryant 25'	Report		Stadium: Legacy Center Sports Complex

June 25	Detroit City FC (United States)	0–1	(Mexico) Santos Laguna	Hamtramck, MI
7:00 PM EST		Report		Stadium: Keyworth Stadium

=== USL Championship ===
==== Eastern Conference ====
Pos	Team	Pld	W	L	T	GF	GA	GD	Pts	Qualification
6	Loudoun United FC	30	12	12	6	45	48	−3	42	Playoffs
7	Rhode Island FC	30	10	12	8	29	28	+1	38	Playoffs
8	Detroit City FC	30	9	11	10	33	35	−2	37	Playoffs
9	Indy Eleven	30	10	15	5	44	52	−8	35	
10	Tampa Bay Rowdies	30	9	14	7	43	50	−7	34	

Source: USL Championship Standings
Rules for classification: 1) head-to-head points; 2) head-to-head goal differential; 3) points-per-game within conference; 4) total wins; 5) total goal differential; 6) total goals scored; 7) points earned against top four Conference finishers; 8) disciplinary points; 9) coin toss or drawing of lots

Overall								Home						Away					
Pld	W	D	L	GF	GA	GD	Pts	W	D	L	GF	GA	GD	W	D	L	GF	GA	GD
30	9	10	11	33	35	−2	37	6	4	5	18	12	+6	3	6	6	15	23	−8

Last updated: October 28, 2025.
Source: Match reports

==== Matches ====
On December 19, 2024, the USL Championship released the schedule for all 24 teams for both the regular season and the USL Jägermeister Cup.

March 8 1	Miami FC	0–2	Detroit City FC	Miami, FL
7:00 PM EST	Blanco (yellow card) 17'; Romero (yellow card) 30'; Bonfiglio (yellow card) 39' (red card) 42'; Díaz (yellow card) 69'; Ricketts (yellow card) 77'; Verón (yellow card) 85'	Report	Polisi (yellow card) 24'; Bryant 31'; Rutz 87'	Stadium: Pitbull Stadium; Attendance: 1,394; Referee: Alyssa Nichols

March 15 2	Colorado Springs Switchbacks	1–2	Detroit City FC	Colorado Springs, CO
6:00 PM EDT	Tejada 47'; Fontana (yellow card) 73'	Report	Polisi (yellow card) 10'; Wiedt (yellow card) 38'; Smith 62'; Lacroix 81' (o.g.)	Stadium: Weidner Field; Attendance: 8,023; Referee: Greg Dopka

March 22 3	Detroit City FC	2–2	Birmingham Legion FC	Hamtramck, MI
4:00 PM EDT	Smith 20'; Morris 33'; Ry. Williams (yellow card) 83'	Report	Damus 27'; Tregarthen (yellow card) 76'; Carroll 80' (o.g.)	Stadium: Keyworth Stadium; Attendance: 6,642; Referee: John Griggs

March 29 4	Louisville City FC	2–0	Detroit City FC	Louisville, KY
4:00 PM EDT	Serrano 20'; Goodrum (yellow card) 41'; Duncan (yellow card) 50'; Davila (yellow card) 67'; Wilson 77'; Lambert (red card) 84'	Report	Rh. Williams (yellow card) 37'	Stadium: Lynn Family Stadium; Attendance: 9,004; Referee: Ekaterina Koroleva

April 5 5	Detroit City FC	0–0	Monterey Bay FC	Hamtramck, MI
4:00 PM EDT	Smith (yellow card) 56'; Villanueva (yellow card) 76'; Rutz (yellow card) 90+1'	Report	Malango (yellow card) 34'; Gordon (yellow card) 72'; Garcia (yellow card) 90+1'	Stadium: Keyworth Stadium; Attendance: 5,047; Referee: Gerald Flores

April 12 6	Phoenix Rising FC	2–3	Detroit City FC	Phoenix, AZ
10:00 PM EDT	Okello (yellow card) 15'; Smith 42'; Margaritha (yellow card) 50'; Avayevu 71'	Report	Williams (yellow card) 11'; Smith 87' 89'; Cedeño 90'	Stadium: Phoenix Rising Soccer Stadium; Attendance: 4,861; Referee: Natalie Simon

April 19 7	Detroit City FC	2–0	Rhode Island FC	Hamtramck, MI
4:00 PM EDT	Smith 17' 19'; Villanueva (yellow card) 70'; Sheldon (yellow card) 90+6'	Report	Nodarse (red card) 6'; Williams (yellow card) 55'	Stadium: Keyworth Stadium; Attendance: 5,539; Referee: Joshua Encarnación

May 3 8	Indy Eleven	2–2	Detroit City FC	Indianapolis, IN
7:00 PM EDT	Amoh 27' 66'; White (yellow card) 32' (yellow-red card) 60'; Musa (yellow card) 55'; Quinn (yellow card) 64'	Report	Rutz 2'; Ry. Williams (yellow card) 4'; Smith 15'; Yamazaki (yellow card) 58'; Chapman (yellow card) 65'; Bryant (yellow card) 72'; Amoo-Mensah (yellow card) 85'	Stadium: Michael A. Carroll Stadium; Attendance: 9,738; Referee: Elijio Arreguin

May 10 9	Hartford Athletic	0–0	Detroit City FC	Hartford, CT
7:00 PM EDT	Hairston (yellow card) 24'; Anderson (yellow card) 45+3'; Obalola (yellow card) 77'	Report	Villanueva (yellow card) 19'; Bryant (yellow card) 22'; Ry. Williams (yellow card) 84'	Stadium: Trinity Health Stadium; Attendance: 5,304; Referee: Calin Radosav

May 17 10	Birmingham Legion	1–1	Detroit City FC	Birmingham, AL
5:00 PM EDT	Rutz (yellow card) 40'; Villanueva 46'; Chapman (yellow card) 76'; Polisi (yellow card) 86'	Report	Laszo (yellow card) 66'; Martínez (yellow card) 69'; Kavita 81'; Hernández-Foster (yellow card) 82'	Stadium: Protective Stadium; Attendance: 4,527; Referee: Jeremy Scheer

May 24 11	Detroit City FC	1–3	Charleston Battery	Hamtramck, MI
4:00 PM EDT	Chapman 2' (yellow card) 87'; Gasso (yellow card) 32'; Amoo-Mensah (yellow card) 84'	Report	Jennings 5' 44'; Torres 52'; Landry (yellow card) 87'	Stadium: Keyworth Stadium; Attendance: 6,733; Referee: Elton García

June 7 12	Pittsburgh Riverhounds	2–0	Detroit City FC	Pittsburgh, PA
7:00 PM EDT	Barnes 37'; Mertz (yellow card) 48' (goal) 66'; Griffin (yellow card) 84'	Report	Bryant (yellow card) 45+2'; Gasso (yellow card) 85'	Stadium: Highmark Stadium; Attendance: 5,007; Referee: Muhammad Hassan

June 14 13	Loudoun United	3–2	Detroit City FC	Leesburg, VA
6:00 PM EDT	Aboukoura 38' 45+4' (yellow card) 54'; McCabe (yellow card) 40'; Nyeman (yellow card) 48'; Awuah (yellow card) 54'; Ryan (yellow card) 58' (goal) 64'	Report	Morris 22'; Gasso (yellow card) 49'; Bryant 52'; Rutz (yellow card) 60'	Stadium: Segra Field; Attendance: 1,433; Referee: Abdou Ndiaye

June 21 14	Detroit City FC	2–0	Miami FC	Hamtramck, MI
4:00 PM EDT	Cedeño 44'; Sheldon (yellow card) 52'; Smith (penalty missed) 62'; Diouf 90+5'	Report	Vázquez (yellow card) 7'; Ricketts (yellow card) 30'; Mercado (yellow card) 38'; Lawrence (red card) 86'	Stadium: Keyworth Stadium; Attendance: 6,004; Referee: Brandon Stevis

July 5 15	Oakland Roots	2–0	Detroit City FC	Oakland, CA
10:00 PM EDT	Prentice (yellow card) 35'; Elmasnaouy (yellow card) 39'; Armenakas 55'; Polisi 85' (o.g.)	Report		Stadium: Oakland Coliseum; Attendance: 5,191; Referee: Greg Dopka

July 12 16	Detroit City FC	1–2	Hartford Athletic	Hamtramck, MI
7:00 PM EDT	Jiménez 5'; Dieng 23' (yellow card) 34'; Beckford (yellow card) 36'; Makangila (yellow card) 44'; Ngalina (penalty missed) 50'; Hairston (yellow card) 76'; Siaha (yellow card) 80'	Report	Diouf (yellow card) 21' (goal) 38'	Stadium: Keyworth Stadium; Attendance: 6,529; Referee: Trevor Wiseman

July 19 17	Detroit City FC	0–0	Pittsburgh Riverhounds	Hamtramck, MI
7:00 PM EDT		Report	Sample (yellow card) 51'; Barnes (yellow card) 79'	Stadium: Keyworth Stadium; Attendance: 7,235; Referee: Abdou Ndiaye

August 6 18	Rhode Island FC	1–0	Detroit City FC	Pawtucket, RI
7:00 PM EDT	Ybarra (yellow card) 49'; Rodriguez 60' (pen.) (yellow card) 89'; Mabika (yellow card) 72'; Corcoran (yellow card) 83'; Brito (yellow card) 90+6'	Report	Yamazaki (yellow card) 28'; Cedeño (yellow card) 57'; Dichio (yellow card) 57'; Diop (yellow card) 72'; Sheldon (yellow card) 90+7'	Stadium: Tidewater Stadium; Attendance: 7,776; Referee: Corbyn May

August 9 19	Detroit City FC	1–0	Indy Eleven	Hamtramck, MI
7:00 PM EDT	Bryant (yellow card) 38'; Musa 57' (o.g.)	Report	Rendón (red card) 30'; Charles-Cook (yellow card) 88'	Stadium: Keyworth Stadium; Attendance: 6,317; Referee: Matthew Corrigan

August 15 20	North Carolina FC	1–1	Detroit City FC	Cary, NC
7:00 PM EDT	Dolabella 23' (yellow card) 66'; Perez (yellow card) 80'	Report	Smith 62'; Cedeño (yellow card) 90+3'	Stadium: WakeMed Soccer Park; Attendance: 2,011; Referee: Christian Campo Hernández

August 23 21	Detroit City FC	2–0	Tampa Bay Rowdies	Hamtramck, MI
7:00 PM EDT	Diouf 30'; Smith 39'	Report	Bodily (yellow card) 29'; Wyke (yellow card) 46'; Arteaga (yellow card) 60'	Stadium: Keyworth Stadium; Attendance: 6,686; Referee: John Matto

August 30 22	Detroit City FC	1–1	San Antonio FC	Hamtramck, MI
7:00 PM EDT	Hernandez-Foster 66'; LeFlore (yellow card) 90+3'; Obeid (yellow card) 90+4'; Cedeño (yellow card) 90+4'; Chapman (yellow card) 90+6'	Report	J. Hernández 21' (pen.) (yellow card) 90+9'; Souahy (yellow card) 51'; Neville (yellow card) 72'; Omar (yellow card) 90+3'; N. Hernandez (yellow card) 90+5'; Soto (yellow card) 90+7'; Patiño (yellow card) 90+10'	Stadium: Keyworth Stadium; Attendance: 6,233; Referee: Nabil Bensalah

September 6 23	Detroit City FC	4–1	Orange County SC	Hamtramck, MI
7:00 PM EDT	Smith 12' (yellow card) 27'; Yamazaki (yellow card) 22'; Diouf 31'; Cedeño 40'; LeFlore (yellow card) 72'; Villanueva 88'	Report	Zubak 16' (pen.); Latinovich (yellow card) 36'; Benalcazar (yellow card) 56'; Ciotta (yellow card) 60'; Hegardt (yellow card) 86'	Stadium: Keyworth Stadium; Attendance: 5,671; Referee: Edson Carvajal

September 10 24	New Mexico United	4–0	Detroit City FC	Albuquerque, NM
9:00 PM EDT	Bailey 5'; Gloster 20'; Tambakis (yellow card) 21'; Hurst 69'; Vargas (yellow card) 74'; Harris] (yellow card) 74'; Noël 90+7'	Report	Ry. Williams (yellow card) 54'; Bryant (yellow card) 90+1'	Stadium: Isotopes Park; Attendance: 7,347; Referee: Joshua Encarnación

September 20 25	Detroit City FC	0–1	Lexington SC	Hamtramck, MI
7:00 PM EDT	Carroll (yellow card) 72'	Report	Gilbert (yellow card) 5'; Williams (yellow card) 63'; Burke (yellow card) 66'; Ajago 74' (yellow card) 88'; Ketterer (yellow card) 84'	Stadium: Keyworth Stadium; Attendance: 6,123; Referee: Muhammad Hassan

September 27 26	Detroit City FC	0–1	Louisville City FC	Hamtramck, MI
7:00 PM EDT	Diouf (yellow card) 76'	Report	Totsch 6'; Ownby (yellow card) 70'	Stadium: Keyworth Stadium; Attendance: 6,269; Referee: Elton García

October 4 27	Detroit City FC	2–0	North Carolina FC	Hamtramck, MI
4:00 PM EDT	Cedeno 44' (pen.); Wiedt (yellow card) 49'; Diouf 74'; Herrera (yellow card) 90'	Report	da Costa (yellow card) 12'; Bradford (yellow card) 45'	Stadium: Keyworth Stadium; Attendance: 6,127; Referee: Mark Verso

October 11 28	Detroit City FC	0–1	Loudoun United	Hamtramck, MI
4:00 PM EDT	Ry. Williams (yellow card) 33'; Yamazaki (yellow card) 55'; Amoo-Mensah (yellow card) 57'; Bryant (yellow card) 89'	Report	Tubbs (yellow card) 63'; Bidois 90+1' (yellow card) 90+5'	Stadium: Keyworth Stadium; Attendance: 6,285; Referee: Luis Arroyo

October 18 29	Charleston Battery	1−1	Detroit City FC	Mount Pleasant, SC
7:30 PM EDT	Myers (yellow card) 5' (goal) 65'	Report	Ry. Williams (yellow card) 26'; Amoo-Mensah (yellow card) 58'; Bryant (yellow card) 58'; Diouf 66'	Stadium: Patriots Point Soccer Complex; Attendance: 4,020; Referee: Muhammad Kaleia

October 25 30	Tampa Bay Rowdies	1−1	Detroit City FC	St. Petersburg, FL
7:30 PM EDT	Lasso (yellow card) 55'; Pacius 81'	Report	Ry. Williams (yellow card) 42'; LeFlore 58'; Bryant (yellow card) 71'; Amoo-Mensah (yellow card) 90+6'	Stadium: Al Lang Stadium; Attendance: 7,326; Referee: Elijio Arreguin

==== Playoffs ====
Detroit City clinched their fourth consecutive trip to the USL Championship playoffs on the final day of the regular season, keeping their perfect playoff streak since joining the league alive. In the first round, they equalled their 2023 feat of eliminating the supporter's shield winner after narrowly making the playoffs as the number 8 seed.

November 1 Eastern Quarterfinals	Louisville City FC	0–1	Detroit City FC	Louisville, KY
7:00 PM EST	Ownby (yellow card) 71'	Report	Amoo-Mensah 34'; Cedeño (yellow card) 73'; LeFlore (yellow card) 79'	Stadium: Lynn Family Stadium; Attendance: 8,210; Referee: Greg Dopka

November 8 Eastern Semifinals	Pittsburgh Riverhounds SC	0–0 (a.e.t.) (4-3 p)	Detroit City FC	Pittsburgh, PA
7:30 PM EST	Barnes (yellow card) 77'; Williams (yellow card) 86'	Report	Bryant (yellow card) 90+2'	Stadium: Highmark Stadium; Attendance: 6,220; Referee: Natalie Simon
	Penalties
	Jacquesson (penalty scored); Mertz (penalty missed); A. Williams (penalty scored); Suber (penalty scored); Ydrach (penalty scored)		(penalty scored) Guenzatti; (penalty scored) Hernández-Foster; (penalty missed) Amoo-Mensah; (penalty missed) Ry. Williams; (penalty scored) Bryant

=== USL Jägermeister Cup ===
Detroit City was placed into group 4 for the group stage, alongside Hartford Athletic, Pittsburgh Riverhounds, Portland Hearts of Pine, Rhode Island FC and Westchester SC. They were eliminated on the final day of the group stage despite a 3–0 win against Westchester.

==== Table ====
Pos	Lg	Team	Pld	W	PKW	PKL	L	GF	GA	GD	Pts	Qualification
1	USLC	Rhode Island FC	4	3	0	1	0	11	4	+7	10	Advance to knockout stage
2	USLC	Hartford Athletic	4	2	1	1	0	9	6	+3	9	Advance to knockout stage (wild card)
3	USLC	Detroit City FC	4	2	1	0	1	8	6	+2	8	
4	USL1	Portland Hearts of Pine	4	1	1	0	2	7	10	−3	5	
5	USLC	Pittsburgh Riverhounds SC	4	1	0	1	2	3	4	−1	4	
6	USL1	Westchester SC	4	0	0	0	4	3	11	−8	0	

Updated to match(es) played on July 26, 2025. Source: USL

==== Matches ====
April 26 Group stage	Detroit City FC	1–0	Pittsburgh Riverhounds	Hamtramck, MI
4:00 PM EDT	Ry. Williams (yellow card) 10'; Smith 90+1'	Report	O’Toole (yellow card) 25'; Suber (yellow card) 33'; Wälti (yellow card) 90'	Stadium: Keyworth Stadium; Attendance: 5,716; Referee: Matthew Corrigan

May 31 Group stage	Portland Hearts of Pine	4–2	Detroit City FC	Portland, ME
6:00 PM EDT	Liadi 5'; Wright 28'; Varela 79'; Mohamed 85'	Report	Guenzatti 52'; Smith 81'	Stadium: Fitzpatrick Stadium; Attendance: 5,651; Referee: Luis Arroyo

June 28 Group Stage	Hartford Athletic	2–2 (2–3 p)	Detroit City FC	Hartford, CT
7:00 PM EDT	Anderson 2'; Ngalina 28'	Report	Sheldon 16', 90'	Stadium: Trinity Health Stadium; Attendance: 5,271; Referee: Rodrigo Albuquerque
	Penalties
	Ngalina (penalty missed); Anderson (penalty missed); Dieng (penalty scored); Farrell (penalty scored); Diz (penalty missed)		(penalty missed) Diouf; (penalty missed) Rutz; (penalty scored) Guenzatti; (penalty scored) Yamazaki; (penalty scored) Bryant

July 26 Group stage	Detroit City FC	3–0	Westchester SC	Hamtramck, MI
7:00 PM EDT	Rh. Williams (yellow card) 11'; Ry. Williams (yellow card) 28'; Diouf 45+3' (pen.); Wiedt (yellow card) 45+5'; Amoo-Mensah 71'; Yamazaki (yellow card) 81'; Sheldon 89'	Report	N. Powder (yellow card) 16' (yellow-red card) 45+6'; Palma (yellow card) 25'; Obregón (yellow card) 45+2'; Hammersley (yellow card) 56'	Stadium: Keyworth Stadium; Attendance: 6,954; Referee: Atahan Yaya

=== U.S. Open Cup ===
As one of the top four teams in the USL Championship Eastern Conference in the 2024 season, Detroit City entered the tournament in the third round as a guaranteed host. They were eliminated in the round of 32 by Chicago Fire of MLS.

April 16 Third Round	Detroit City FC (Michigan)	3–1	(New York (state)) Westchester SC	Hamtramck, MI
7:00 PM EDT	Polisi (yellow card) 39'; Gasso (yellow card) 55'; Doner 71'; Cedeño 85' (pen.); Smith 90+4'	Report	Pierre (yellow card) 13'; Adewole (yellow card) 58'; Obregón 76'; Johnson (yellow card) 79'	Stadium: Keyworth Stadium; Attendance: 2,079; Referee: Edson Carvajal

May 7 Round of 32	Chicago Fire FC (Illinois)	4–0	(Michigan) Detroit City FC	Chicago, IL
8:00 PM EDT	Cuypers 4'; Smith 35' (o.g.); Glasgow 50'; Haile-Selassie 71'	Report	Ry. Williams (yellow card) 41'; Rh. Williams (yellow card) 70'	Stadium: SeatGeek Stadium; Attendance: 4,374; Referee: Matthew Thompson

== Statistics ==
No.	Pos	Nat	Player	Total		USL		USL Playoffs		USL Cup		U.S. Open Cup	
No.	Pos	Nat	Player	Apps	Goals	Apps	Goals	Apps	Goals	Apps	Goals	Apps	Goals
Goalkeepers
16	GK	(Zimbabwe) ZIM	Tatenda Mkuruva	0	0	0	0	0	0	0	0	0	0
21	GK	(Mexico) MEX	Carlos Herrera	17	0	16	0	0	0	1	0	0	0
91	GK	(Mexico) MEX	Carlos Saldaña	21	0	14	0	2	0	3	0	2	0
Defenders
2	DF	(United States) USA	Rhys Williams	19	0	16	0	0	0	2	0	1	0
3	DF	(United States) USA	Alex Villanueva	34	2	28	2	2	0	3	0	1	0
4	DF	(United States) USA	Shane Wiedt	30	0	23	0	2	0	3	0	2	0
5	DF	(Republic of Ireland) IRL	Stephen Carroll	25	0	19	0	2	0	3	0	1	0
13	DF	(United States) USA	Matthew Sheldon	21	3	16	0	1	0	3	3	1	0
30	DF	(United States) USA	Devon Amoo-Mensah	35	2	27	0	2	1	4	1	2	0
33	DF	(Canada) CAN	Morey Doner	7	1	6	0	0	0	0	0	1	1
33	DF	(United States) USA	Isaiah LeFlore	11	1	9	1	2	0	0	0	0	0
Midfielders
6	MF	(Canada) CAN	Jay Chapman	32	1	25	1	2	0	3	0	2	0
8	MF	(Senegal) SEN	Abdoulaye Diop	16	0	14	0	0	0	2	0	0	0
12	MF	(United States) USA	Michael Bryant	36	2	29	2	2	0	3	0	2	0
14	MF	(Japan) JPN	Haruki Yamazaki	30	0	22	0	2	0	4	0	2	0
22	MF	(United States) USA	Kobe Hernandez-Foster	14	1	12	1	2	0	0	0	0	0
24	MF	(United States) USA	Dominic Gasso	9	0	6	0	0	0	2	0	1	0
27	MF	(United States) USA	Zain Elder	0	0	0	0	0	0	0	0	0	0
39	MF	(England) ENG	Ryan Williams	30	0	24	0	2	0	3	0	1	0
45	MF	(Canada) CAN	Marcello Polisi	10	0	8	0	0	0	0	0	2	0
Forwards
7	FW	(South Africa) RSA	Darren Smith	36	13	28	10	2	0	4	2	2	1
9	FW	(England) ENG	Ben Morris	16	2	12	2	0	0	2	0	2	0
10	FW	(Ecuador) ECU	Jeciel Cedeño	37	5	29	4	2	0	4	0	2	1
11	FW	(United States) USA	Connor Rutz	22	2	18	2	0	0	3	0	1	0
23	FW	(Uruguay) URU	Sebastián Guenzatti	23	1	18	0	1	0	3	1	1	0
32	FW	(Senegal) SEN	Ates Diouf	28	7	22	6	2	0	3	1	1	0
66	FW	(United States) USA	Bilal Obeid	4	0	3	0	0	0	1	0	0	0
99	FW	(United States) USA	Jordan Adebayo-Smith	21	0	16	0	2	0	1	0	2	0

Last updated: November 22, 2025.

=== Top scorers ===
Rank	Position	Number	Name	USL	USL Playoffs	USL Cup	U.S. Open Cup	Total
1	FW	7	Darren Smith	10	0	2	1	13
2	FW	32	Ates Diouf	6	0	1	0	7
3	FW	10	Jeciel Cedeño	4	0	0	1	5
4	DF	13	Matt Sheldon	0	0	3	0	3
5	DF	3	Alex Villanueva	2	0	0	0	2
5	FW	9	Ben Morris	2	0	0	0	2
5	FW	11	Connor Rutz	2	0	0	0	2
5	DF	30	Devon Amoo-Mensah	0	1	1	0	2
5	MF	12	Michael Bryant	2	0	0	0	2
10	DF	33	Isaiah LeFlore	1	0	0	0	1
10	MF	6	Jay Chapman	1	0	0	0	1
10	MF	22	Kobe Hernández-Foster	1	0	0	0	1
10	DF	33	Morey Doner	0	0	0	1	1
10	FW	23	Sebastián Guenzatti	0	0	1	0	1

Last updated: November 22, 2025.
