= Jay Chapman (soccer) =

Canadian soccer player (born 1994)

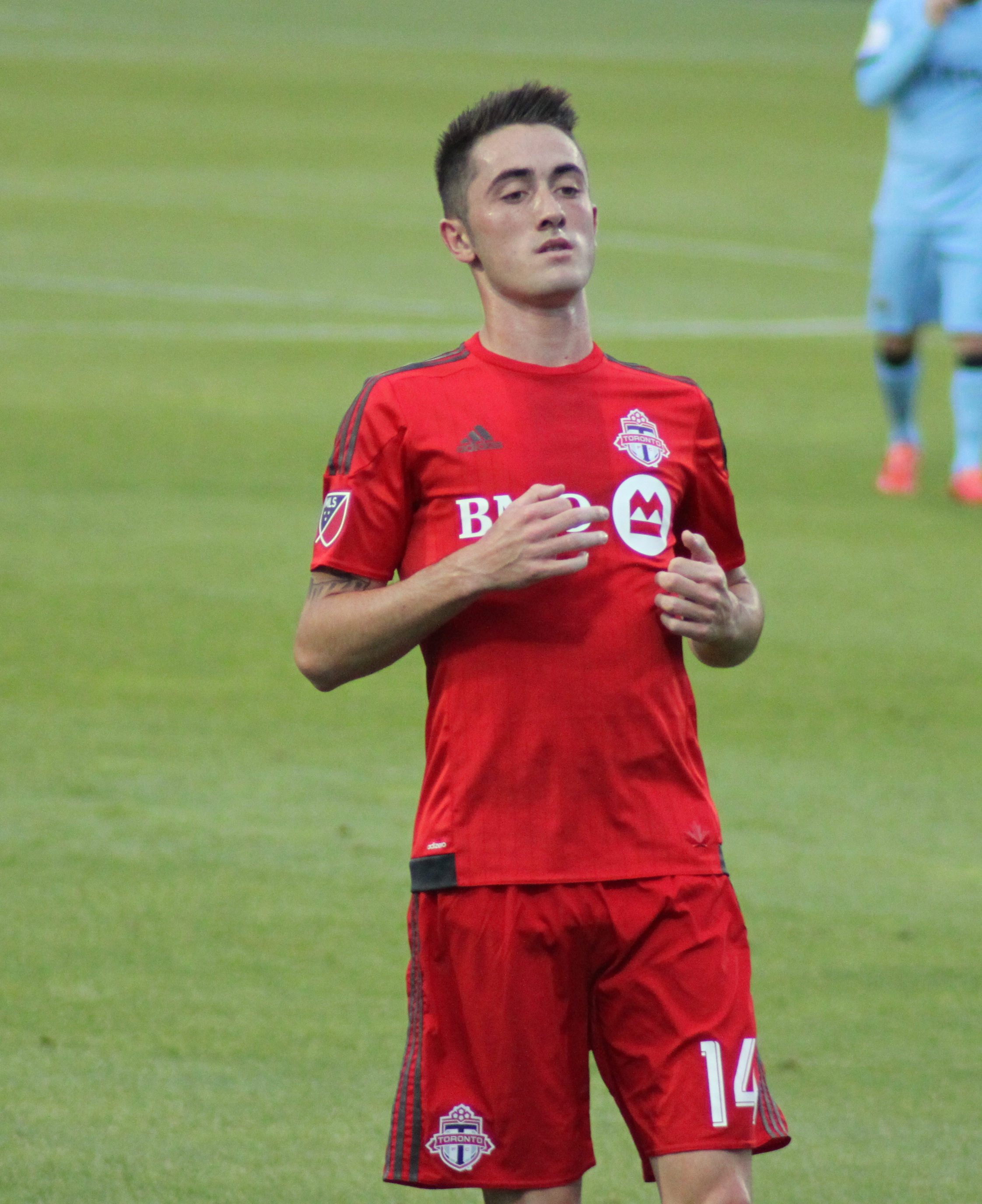
- Chapman with Toronto FC in 2015

Personal information
- Full name: Jay Tyler Chapman
- Date of birth: January 1, 1994 (age 32)
- Place of birth: Brampton, Ontario, Canada
- Height: 1.83 m (6 ft 0 in)
- Position: Midfielder

Youth career
- Brampton East SC
- Ajax SC
- 2010–2012: Toronto FC

College career
Years	Team	Apps	(Gls)
2012–2014	Michigan State Spartans	64	(12)

Senior career*
Years	Team	Apps	(Gls)
2012	SC Toronto	6	(1)
2013–2014	K-W United	25	(6)
2015–2019	Toronto FC II	15	(3)
2015–2019	Toronto FC	79	(6)
2020–2021	Inter Miami	33	(0)
2022	Dundee	2	(0)
2023	Colorado Springs Switchbacks	27	(1)
2024	Hartford Athletic	17	(1)
2024	→ Charleston Battery (loan)	12	(0)
2025	Detroit City	25	(1)

International career^{‡}
2011	Canada U17	3	(0)
2015	Canada U23	4	(0)
2017–	Canada	3	(1)
- * Club domestic league appearances and goals as of October 25, 2025 ‡ National team caps and goals as of January 7, 2020

Jay Tyler Chapman (born January 1, 1994) is a Canadian professional soccer player who last plays as a midfielder.

== Early career ==
Chapman spent two years at TFC Academy, before leaving to play at Michigan State University. During his final year, Chapman was named as a First Team All-American, the first Spartan to achieve first team honours since 1970. Chapman was also a 2014 MAC Hermann Trophy semifinalist, and Big Ten Midfielder of the Year. In 2012, he signed with SC Toronto of the Canadian Soccer League, and made his debut on May 11, 2012, in a match against St. Catharines Wolves, and recorded his first goal for the club in a 5–0 victory.

In 2013, Chapman made 14 appearances and scored three goals for K-W United in the PDL.

== Professional career ==
Chapman signed with Toronto FC as a homegrown player on January 15, 2015.

Chapman was loaned to Toronto FC's USL club, Toronto FC II, on March 20, 2015.

He made his debut against the Charleston Battery on March 21. He scored his first goal for Toronto FC II against Whitecaps FC 2 on April 19. Chapman made his Toronto FC debut a few weeks later in the 2015 Canadian Championship against the Montreal Impact on May 6 as a substitute.

On July 12, 2016, Chapman and teammate Jordan Hamilton were named to the 2016 Chipotle MLS Homegrown team as part of Major League Soccer's 2016 All Star Game festivities.

On November 13, 2019, Chapman was traded to Inter Miami in exchange for $100,000 in General Allocation Money. Following the 2021 season, Chapman's contract option was declined by Miami.

In January 2022, Scottish Premiership club Dundee announced they had signed Chapman to a deal, subject to international clearance and a work permit. Chapman would make his debut as a substitute in the Dundee derby on February 1. Chapman would play once more for Dundee in a league game against Motherwell as he would struggle to break into the first team. Chapman returned to North America at the end of the season, and despite being contracted for another year he did not return to Scotland, apparently due to "paperwork issues". Chapman would officially leave Dundee by mutual consent in October.

In January 2023, Chapman signed for USL Championship club Colorado Springs Switchbacks.

In November 2023, Chapman signed with Hartford Athletic of the USL Championship for the 2024 season. He made his debut on March 9 in a league win over El Paso Locomotive.

Detroit City announced on February 3, 2025 that they had acquired Chapman via transfer from Hartford.

== International career ==
Chapman represented Canada at the U-17 level at the 2011 CONCACAF U-17 Championship, and the 2011 FIFA U-17 World Cup.

Chapman made his debut for the senior team on January 22, 2017, against Bermuda and scored on his first appearance in a 4–2 victory.

== Career statistics ==
=== Club ===
As of matches played on November 9, 2025

Club	Season	League			Playoffs		National Cup		Continental (Note: Includes CONCACAF Champions League matches)		Other (Note: Includes Campeones Cup and Scottish League Cup matches)		Total	
Club	Season	League	Apps	Goals	Apps	Goals	Apps	Goals	Apps	Goals	Apps	Goals	Apps	Goals
K-W United	2013	Premier Development League	14	3	—		—		—		—		14	3
K-W United	2014	Premier Development League	11	3	0	0	—		—		—		11	3
K-W United	Totals		25	6	0	0	—		—		—		25	6
Toronto FC II	2015	USL	9	2	—		—		—		—		9	2
Toronto FC II	2016	USL	2	0	—		—		—		—		2	0
Toronto FC II	2017	USL	3	1	—		—		—		—		3	1
Toronto FC II	2019	USL League One	1	0	—		—		—		—		1	0
Toronto FC II	Totals		15	3	—		—		—		—		15	3
Toronto FC	2015	Major League Soccer	10	0	0	0	1	0	—		—		11	0
Toronto FC	2016	Major League Soccer	18	0	0	0	1	0	—		—		19	0
Toronto FC	2017	Major League Soccer	12	1	0	0	1	0	—		—		13	0
Toronto FC	2018	Major League Soccer	22	3	—		3	0	1	0	1	0	27	3
Toronto FC	2019	Major League Soccer	17	2	0	0	1	0	—		—		18	2
Toronto FC	Totals		79	6	0	0	6	0	2	0	1	0	88	6
Inter Miami	2020	Major League Soccer	8	0	0	0	—		—		—		8	0
Inter Miami	2021	Major League Soccer	25	0	—		—		—		—		25	0
Inter Miami	Totals		33	0	0	0	0	0	0	0	0	0	33	0
Dundee	2021–22	Scottish Premiership	2	0	—		0	0	—		0	0	2	0
Dundee	2022–23	Scottish Championship	0	0	—		0	0	—		0	0	0	0
Colorado Springs Switchbacks	2023	USL Championship	27	1	1	0	0	0	—		—		28	1
Hartford Athletic	2024	USL Championship	17	1	0	0	0	0	—		—		17	1
Charleston Battery (loan)	2024	USL Championship	12	0	3	0	0	0	—		—		15	0
Detroit City	2025	USL Championship	25	1	2	0	2	0	—		3	0	32	1
Career totals			236	18	6	0	8	0	2	0	4	0	256	18

=== International ===
==== International statistics ====
As of matches played January 7, 2020

Canada national team
Year	Apps	Goals
2017	2	1
2018	0	0
2019	0	0
2020	1	0
Total	3	1

==== International goals ====
As of match played January 22, 2017
Scores and results list Canada's goal tally first.

Goal	Date	Venue	Opponent	Score	Result	Competition
1	January 22, 2017	Bermuda National Stadium, Hamilton, Bermuda	Bermuda	3–2	4–2	Friendly

== Honours ==
Michigan State Spartans

- Big Ten Men's Soccer Tournament: 2012

Toronto

- MLS Cup: 2017
- Supporters' Shield: 2017
- Canadian Championship: 2016, 2017, 2018

Individual

- NCAA Division I men's soccer First-Team All-American: 2014
- Big Ten Midfielder of the Year: 2014
