= Kemar Lawrence =

Jamaican footballer (born 1992)

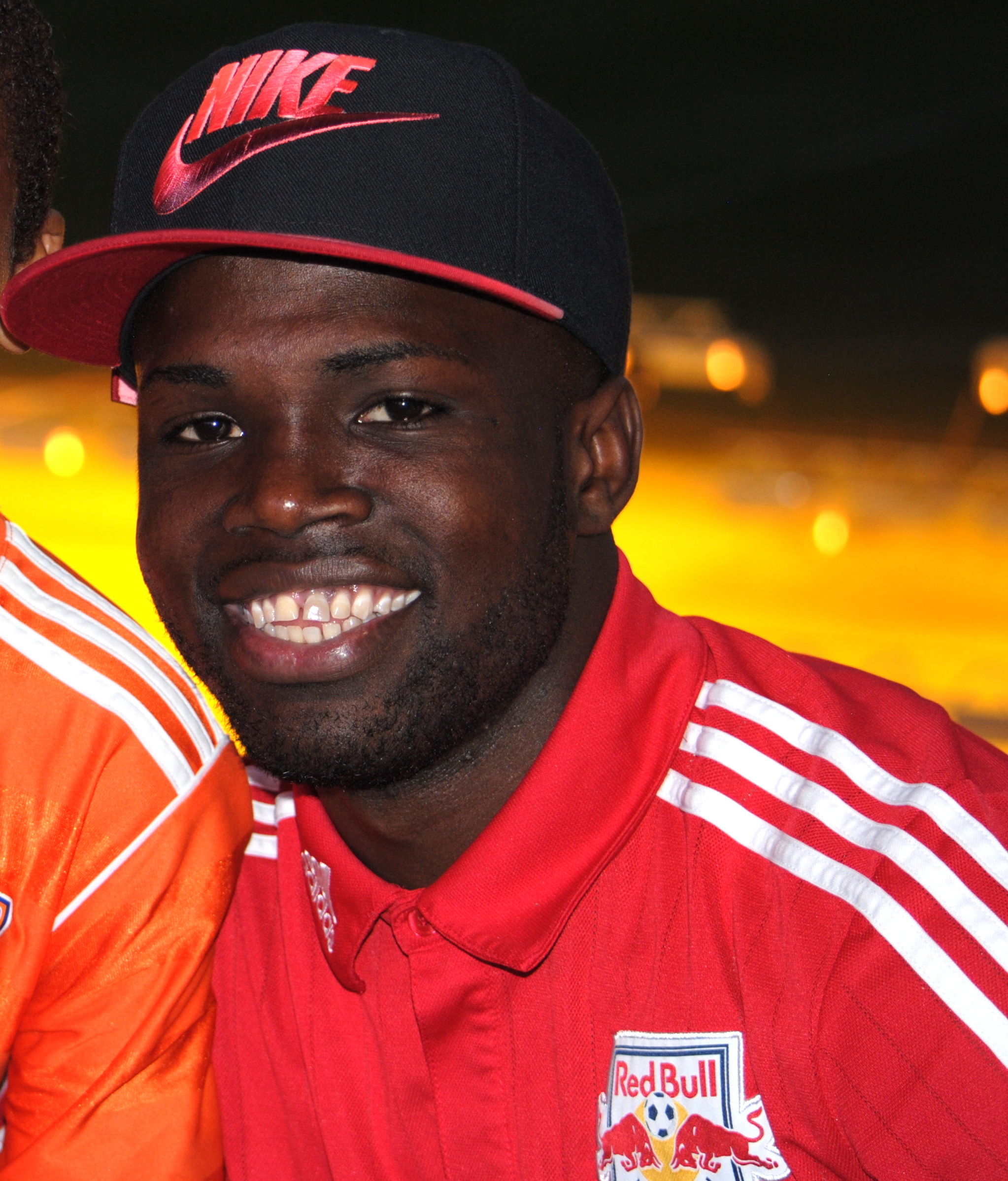
- Lawrence in 2019

Personal information
- Full name: Kemar Michael Lawrence
- Date of birth: 17 September 1992 (age 34)
- Place of birth: Kingston, Jamaica
- Height: 1.78 m (5 ft 10 in)
- Position: Left-back

Youth career
- 2003–2007: Rae Town F.C.
- 2007–2011: Harbour View

Senior career*
Years	Team	Apps	(Gls)
2011–2015	Harbour View	50	(2)
2012	→ Arnett Gardens (loan)		
2015–2020	New York Red Bulls	118	(5)
2020–2021	Anderlecht	16	(1)
2021–2022	Toronto FC	25	(1)
2022–2023	Minnesota United	41	(1)
2024	UTA Arad	2	(0)
2025	Westchester SC	6	(0)

International career^{‡}
- Jamaica U17
2010–2011	Jamaica U20	3	(0)
2013–	Jamaica	77	(3)
Medal record
Men's football
Representing Jamaica
CONCACAF Gold Cup
Runner-up	2015 United States–Canada	Team
Runner-up	2017 United States	Team
- * Club domestic league appearances and goals as of 1 November 2025 ‡ National team caps and goals as of 26 June 2023

Kemar Michael Lawrence (born 17 September 1992) is a Jamaican professional footballer who plays as a left-back. He is currently a free agent after playing for USL League One club Westchester SC, and he also plays for the Jamaica national team.

His nickname is Taxi. In January 2014, Lawrence was announced as a brand ambassador for PepsiCo as part of the 2014 FUTBOLNOW campaign featuring footballers such as Lionel Messi and Sergio Agüero.

== Early life ==
Lawrence is the son of former goalkeeper Orville 'Tutus' Edwards, rated among the best goalkeepers in the Caribbean during his career, who played for Santos FC and the Jamaica national team during the 1970s, and who died in 2005 at 53 years of age from kidney failure.

== Club career ==
=== Jamaica ===
In 2003, Lawrence began his career in the youth ranks of Rae Town football club.

In 2007, he signed for Harbour View, and was part of their National Premier League-winning teams in the 2009–2010. In 2009 Lawrence was briefly part of the residency program of the Canadian club Vancouver Whitecaps, then of the American USL First Division. After primarily playing for Harbour View's U20 team, he broke into the first team in 2011, making a total of 50 appearances.

In 2012, he briefly moved to Arnett Gardens F.C., before returning to Harbour View in September. He was part of Harbour View's championship squad in 2012–2013 seasons.

In 2014 he was selected for the inaugural MLS Caribbean Combine. In July 2014, Lawrence went to the United States for a two-week trial with MLS club D.C. United but was not offered a contract.

=== New York Red Bulls ===
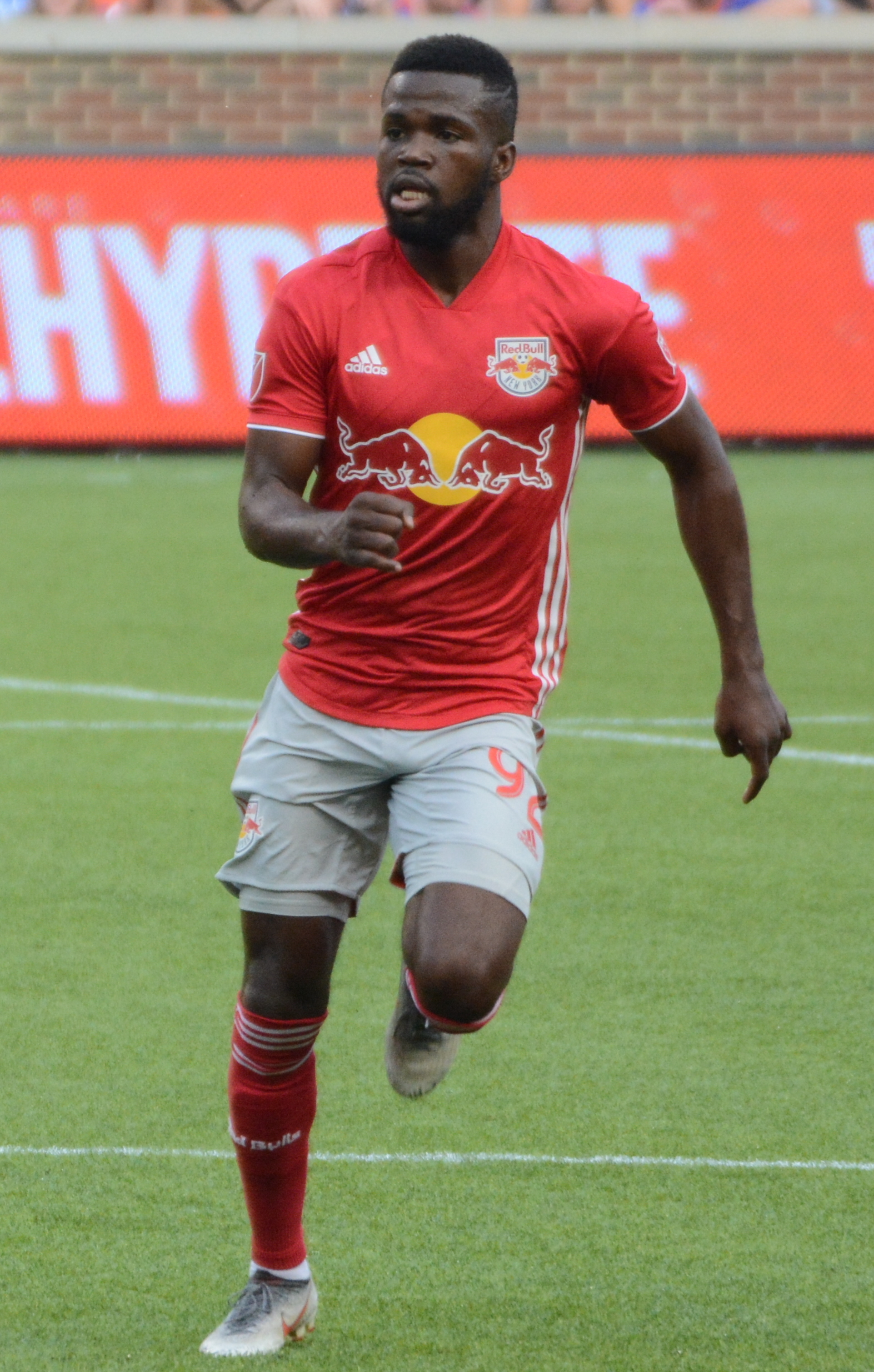
Lawrence with the New York Red Bulls in 2019

On 16 March 2015 it was announced that Lawrence had signed with New York Red Bulls of Major League Soccer after impressing during a preseason trial. On 22 March 2015, Lawrence made his debut for New York playing the full 90 in a 2–0 victory over rival D.C. United at Red Bull Arena. After strong performances at left-back, Lawrence beat out long time defender Roy Miller for the starting spot. On 18 October 2015, Lawrence scored his first goal for New York in a 4–1 victory over Philadelphia Union, helping the club clinch the Eastern Conference regular season title.

On 29 April 2017 Lawrence scored the game-winning goal in New York's 2–1 victory over Chicago Fire. On 23 June 2018 Lawrence scored his first goal of the season in a 3–0 victory over FC Dallas. A week later, on 1 July, Lawrence scored the lone goal in New York's 1–0 victory over Toronto FC.

=== Anderlecht ===
On 31 January 2020, Lawrence moved to Anderlecht for fee of 1.25 million euros. He made his debut on 7 March, as a substitute, in a 7–0 win against Zulte Waregem. On 28 February 2021, he scored his first goal for Anderlecht, scoring the second goal in a 3–1 victory over Standard Liège.

=== Toronto FC ===
On 7 May 2021, he returned to Major League Soccer, joining Toronto FC. On 12 May, he made his debut, coming on as a substitute in a 2–0 victory over the Columbus Crew. On 7 July, Lawrence scored his first goal for Toronto against the New England Revolution, netting the second Toronto goal in an eventual 3–2 victory. Ahead of the 2022 season, he did not join the club for pre-season, as the club worked on a move for him.

=== Minnesota United ===
On March 17, 2022, he was traded to Minnesota United FC in exchange for the MLS rights to Sean O'Hearn and a conditional $50,000 in General Allocation Money. In August 2023, he agreed to mutually terminate his contract with the club.

=== UTA Arad ===
In April 2024, he signed a short-term deal with Romanian Liga I club UTA Arad, with a one-year extension option.

=== Westchester SC ===
Lawrence was announced as the first-ever signing for USL League One expansion club Westchester SC on 12 December 2024.

== International career ==
At the international level, Lawrence has represented the Jamaica under-17 team, the Jamaica under-20, and the national team of Jamaica, the Reggae Boyz.

Lawrence competed in the 2011 CONCACAF U-20 Championship in Guatemala, taking part in Jamaica's two first-round defeats, and receiving a yellow card in the second match against Honduras.

After being part of national team training camps in 2013, Lawrence was first selected for the Reggae Boyz for the CONCACAF fourth round qualifying match against Panama in Panama City in September 2013. Lawrence received his first cap in a friendly against Trinidad and Tobago at the Montego Bay Sports Complex in Montego Bay in November 2013.

Lawrence appeared in all four matches of the Jamaica national team's international tour in the summer of 2014, which saw them play 2014 FIFA World Cup-bound France and Switzerland, along with Serbia and Egypt.

In September 2014, Lawrence scored his first goal for Jamaica in a 3–1 friendly defeat against Canada. Later that year, in November, he scored Jamaica's first goal against Antigua and Barbuda, which came in the final group stage match of their 2014 Caribbean Cup-winning campaign.

Lawrence played at the 2015 Copa América and, despite Jamaica losing all three matches 1–0, Lawrence was deemed the best left-back in the tournament by Rio-based football writer and broadcaster Tim Vickery.

On 23 July 2017, Lawrence scored on a left-footed freekick from just outside of the box to eliminate tournament favorites Mexico and send Jamaica to a second straight Gold Cup Final.

== Style of play ==
Lawrence plays most often on the left side of defence, specialising in the role of a wing-back. Ian Burnett, writing for The Jamaica Observer, described Lawrence as "a feisty wide defender who is solid in defence and on offence", while Winfried Schäfer, former manager of the Jamaica national team, said that Lawrence is a player with good pace and intelligence on the field, while stating his belief that he is a player with "a chance to play in Europe". Leicester City captain and Jamaica teammate Wes Morgan noted Lawrence's defensive abilities in dealing with Switzerland and Bayern Munich winger Xherdan Shaqiri, and he was also praised for his technical quality and attitude by Jamaica teammate and Crystal Palace defender Adrian Mariappa.

== Career statistics ==
=== Club ===
As of match played 28 April 2024

Club	Season	League			National cup		Playoffs		Continental		Total	
Club	Season	Division	Apps	Goals	Apps	Goals	Apps	Goals	Apps	Goals	Apps	Goals
New York Red Bulls	2015	Major League Soccer	23	1	—		4	0	—		27	1
New York Red Bulls	2016	Major League Soccer	21	0	—		1	0	4	0	26	0
New York Red Bulls	2017	Major League Soccer	24	1	3	0	3	0	1	0	31	1
New York Red Bulls	2018	Major League Soccer	28	2	2	0	2	0	6	0	38	2
New York Red Bulls	2019	Major League Soccer	22	1	—		1	0	1	0	10	0
New York Red Bulls	Total		118	5	5	0	11	0	12	0	146	5
Anderlecht	2019–20	Belgian Pro League	1	0	—		—		—		1	0
Anderlecht	2020–21	Belgian Pro League	15	1	1	0	—		—		16	1
Anderlecht	Total		16	1	1	0	—		—		17	1
Toronto FC	2021	Major League Soccer	25	1	1	0	—		—		26	1
Minnesota United	2022	Major League Soccer	27	1	0	0	1	0	—		28	1
Minnesota United	2023	Major League Soccer	14	0	2	0	—		—		16	0
Minnesota United	Total		41	1	2	0	1	0	—		44	1
UTA Arad	2023–24	Liga I	2	0	—		—		—		2	0
Westchester SC	2025	USL League One	6	0	3	0	—		—		9	0
Career total			202	8	9	0	12	0	12	0	235	8

=== International ===
As of match played 29 June 2023

National team	Year	Apps	Goals
Jamaica
Jamaica	2013	2	0
Jamaica	2014	12	2
Jamaica	2015	15	0
Jamaica	2016	6	0
Jamaica	2017	9	1
Jamaica	2018	4	0
Jamaica	2019	10	0
Jamaica	2020	2	0
Jamaica	2021	11	0
Jamaica	2022	3	0
Jamaica	2023	3	0
Total		77	3

==== International goals ====
Scores and results list Jamaica's goal tally first.

No.	Date	Venue	Opponent	Score	Result	Competition
1.	9 September 2014	BMO Field, Toronto, Canada	Canada	1–0	1–3	Friendly
2.	14 November 2014	Montego Bay Sports Complex, Montego Bay, Jamaica	Antigua and Barbuda	1–0	3–0	2014 Caribbean Cup qualification
3.	23 July 2017	Rose Bowl, Pasadena, United States	Mexico	1–0	1–0	2017 CONCACAF Gold Cup

== Honours ==
Harbour View

- Jamaica Premier League: 2012–13

New York Red Bulls

- Supporters' Shield: 2015, 2018
- U.S. Open Cup runner-up: 2017

Jamaica

- CONCACAF Gold Cup runner-up: 2015, 2017
- Caribbean Cup: 2014

Individual

- MLS Best XI: 2018
- CONCACAF Gold Cup Best XI: 2017
- MLS All-Star: 2019
- IFFHS CONCACAF Team of the Decade: 2011–2020
