= Isaiah LeFlore =

American soccer player (born 2002)

Personal information
- Full name: Isaiah LeFlore
- Date of birth: December 11, 2002 (age 23)
- Place of birth: Minneapolis, Minnesota, United States
- Height: 1.74 m (5 ft 9 in)
- Positions: Defender; winger

Team information
- Current team: Tampa Bay Rowdies on loan from Nashville SC
- Number: 19

Youth career
- 2016–2019: Oeiras
- 2020–2022: Sporting Kansas City

Senior career*
Years	Team	Apps	(Gls)
2020–2022	Sporting Kansas City II	26	(1)
2022	Braga B	0	(0)
2022–2023	Houston Dynamo 2	10	(3)
2024–2025	Philadelphia Union	0	(0)
2025	Philadelphia Union II	20	(1)
2025	→ Detroit City (loan)	9	(1)
2026–	Nashville SC	0	(0)
2026	→ Huntsville City FC (loan)	2	(0)
2026	→ Tampa Bay Rowdies (loan)	3	(0)
- * Club domestic league appearances and goals as of August 22, 2026

Isaiah LeFlore (born December 11, 2002) is an American professional soccer player who plays for Tampa Bay Rowdies of the USL Championship on loan from Nashville SC of Major League Soccer.

== Career ==
LeFlore played for a season with Minnesota-based Shattuck-Saint Mary's before spending 3 years in Portugal with Associação Desportiva Oeiras. He returned to the United States and joined Sporting Kansas City's academy at the start of 2020.

On July 25, 2020, LeFlore appeared as an 85th-minute substitute during a 1–0 loss to Louisville City FC.

Signed for the Philadelphia Union on a one-year contract on December 12, 2023, with club options for 2025, 2026, and 2027.

LeFlore signed with Nashville SC on a one-year contract on January 7, 2026 with options for 2027 and 2027-28 seasons.

On May 22, 2026, Tampa Bay Rowdies announced they had acquired LaFlore on loan from Nashville SC for the remainder of the USL Championship season.
