= Dane Jacomen =

American soccer player (born 2001)

Personal information
- Date of birth: February 25, 2001 (age 25)
- Place of birth: Pittsburgh, Pennsylvania, United States
- Height: 1.91 m (6 ft 3 in)
- Position: Goalkeeper

Team information
- Current team: FC Tulsa
- Number: 28

Youth career
- 2014–2017: Pittsburgh Riverhounds
- 2017–2018: D.C. United

College career
Years	Team	Apps	(Gls)
2018–2021	Penn Quakers	24	(0)

Senior career*
Years	Team	Apps	(Gls)
2019	Evergreen FC	12	(0)
2021	West Chester United	13	(0)
2022–2025	Loudoun United	17	(0)
2022	→ Charlotte Independence (loan)	2	(0)
2025	→ Westchester SC (loan)	12	(0)
2026–	FC Tulsa	20	(0)
- * Club domestic league appearances and goals as of November 10, 2026

Dane Jacomen (born February 25, 2001) is an American soccer player who plays as a goalkeeper for USL Championship side FC Tulsa.

== Career ==
=== Youth, college and amateur ===
Jacomen attended Taylor Allderdice High School, where he was a three-year letter winner. He also played club soccer as part of the Pittsburgh Riverhounds academy from 2014, before earning a move to the D.C. United academy in 2017.

In 2018, Jacomen went to the University of Pennsylvania to play college soccer. In three seasons with the Quakers, Jacomen went on to make 24 appearances. In 2019, he was named Philadelphia Soccer Six All-Star and Philadelphia Soccer Six All-Rookie.

While at college, Jacomen played in the USL League Two with Evergreen FC in 2019 and West Chester United in 2021. Having only conceded five goals in 13 games for West Chester in 2021, Jacomen earned the USL League Two Golden Glove Award.

=== Professional ===
With the 2020 collegiate season at Penn cancelled due to the COVID-19 pandemic, Jacomen was eligible for another season of college soccer, but opted to forego that season to pursue a professional career. On May 25, 2022, Jacomen signed with USL Championship side Loudoun United. He made a short-term loan move to USL League One club Charlotte Independence on June 17, 2022, going on to make two appearances for them.

In January 2025, Jacomen joined USL League One side Westchester SC on a season-long loan.

On March 11, 2026, FC Tulsa of the USL Championship announced they had signed Jacomen for the 2026 season.

== Honors ==
=== Individual ===
West Chester United SC

- USL League Two Golden Gloves Award: 2021
