= Kurowskybob Pierre =

American–Haitian footballer (born 2002)

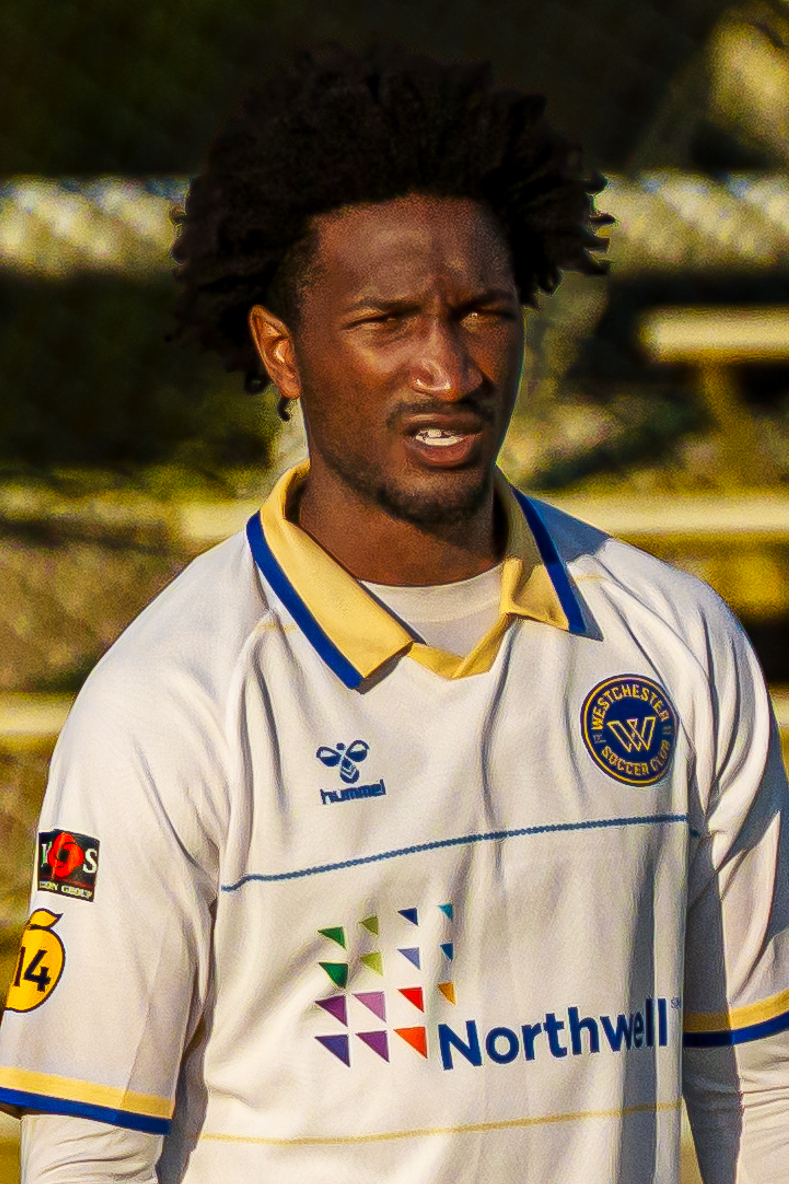
- Pierre playing for Westchester SC in 2026

Personal information
- Full name: Kurowskybob Fertil-Pierre
- Date of birth: August 28, 2002 (age 24)
- Place of birth: Fort Lauderdale, Florida, United States
- Height: 1.88 m (6 ft 2 in)
- Position: Defender

Team information
- Current team: Westchester SC
- Number: 4

Youth career
- –2020: Real Salt Lake
- 2020–2022: Strasbourg

Senior career*
Years	Team	Apps	(Gls)
2019	Real Monarchs	1	(0)
2022–2024	Real Monarchs	41	(1)
2025–	Westchester SC	43	(2)

International career^{‡}
2019	Haiti U17	8	(1)
2020	United States U20	1	(0)
- * Club domestic league appearances and goals as of October 31, 2026 ‡ National team caps and goals as of January 18, 2020

Kurowskybob 'Black Panther' Fertil-Pierre (born August 28, 2002), known as Kurowskybob Pierre or Bobby Pierre, is an American soccer player who plays as a defender for Westchester SC in USL League One. Internationally, in official matches, he has played for the Haiti national under-17 team.

== Club career ==
A member of the academy of Real Salt Lake, Pierre made his professional debut on September 21, 2019, for their USL Championship affiliate Real Monarchs by going the distance in a start against Rio Grande Valley FC.

After playing in France for Strasbourg, Pierre returned to Real Monarchs on February 4, 2022, ahead of their inaugural season in MLS Next Pro.

Pierre joined USL League One expansion club Westchester SC in January 2025.

== International career ==
Pierre is eligible for the United States and Haiti, having been born and raised in the U.S. and of Haitian descent through his Father. In 2019, he played eight total matches for Haiti U17 in the 2019 CONCACAF U-17 Championship and 2019 FIFA U-17 World Cup. On January 8, 2020, he was called up for the first time to United States U20 for their January friendlies.

== Career statistics ==
=== Club ===
As of December 15, 2019.

Club	Season	League			Cup		Continental		Other		Total	
Club	Season	Division	Apps	Goals	Apps	Goals	Apps	Goals	Apps	Goals	Apps	Goals
Real Salt Lake	2019	MLS	0	0	0	0	–		0	0	0	0
Real Monarchs (loan)	2019	USL Championship	1	0	0	0	–		0	0	1	0
Career total			1	0	0	0	0	0	0	0	1	0
