= Shane Wiedt =

American soccer player (born 1995)

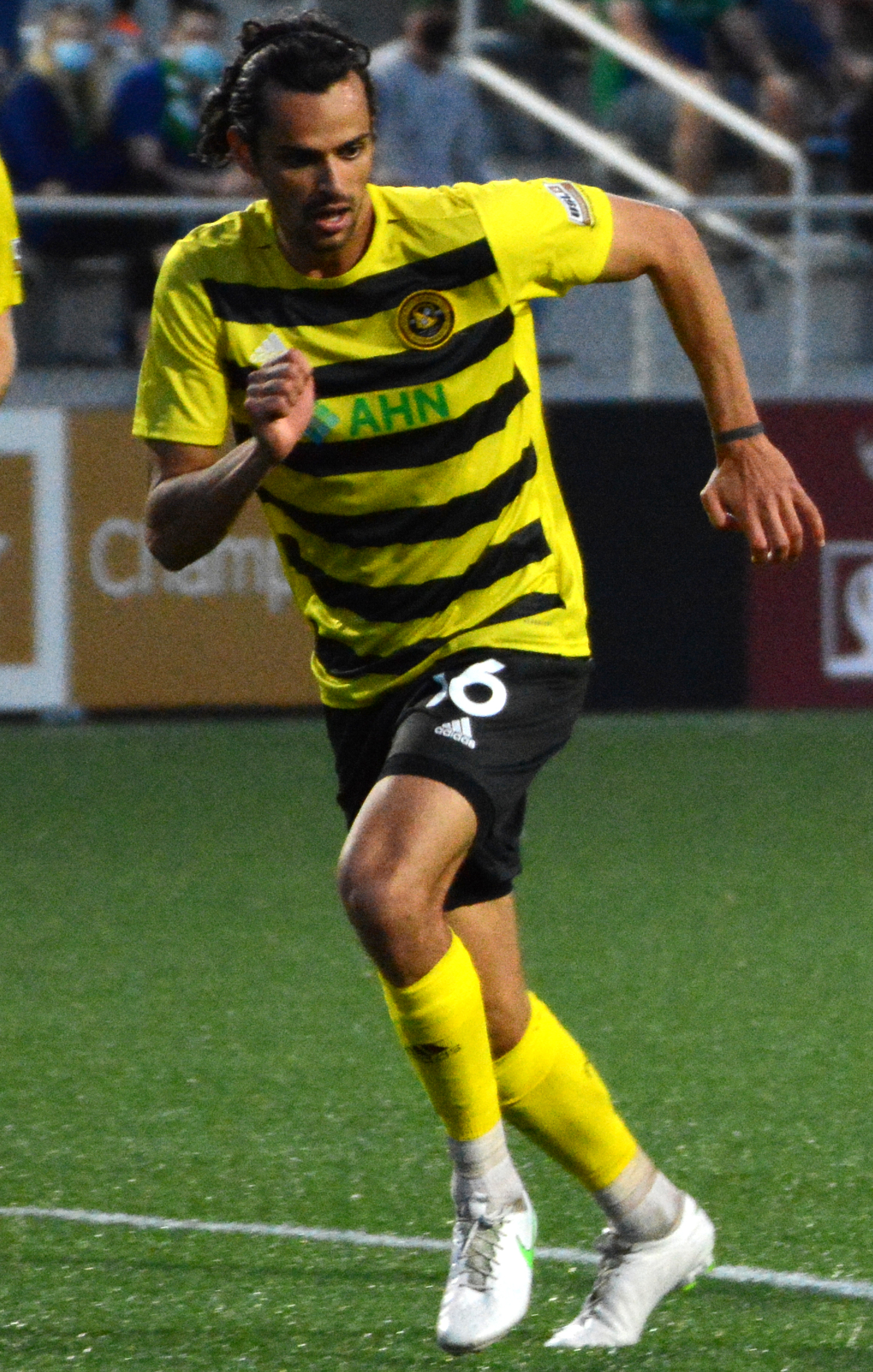
- Wiedt with Pittsburgh Riverhounds in 2021

Personal information
- Full name: Shane Wiedt
- Date of birth: July 19, 1995 (age 31)
- Place of birth: Akron, Ohio, United States
- Height: 1.90 m (6 ft 3 in)
- Position: Defender

College career
Years	Team	Apps	(Gls)
2014–2017	Akron Zips	32	(1)
2018	Pittsburgh Panthers	17	(0)

Senior career*
Years	Team	Apps	(Gls)
2017	Erie Commodores		
2019	Virginia Beach City	6	(0)
2019–2020	Loudoun United	20	(1)
2021–2022	Pittsburgh Riverhounds	64	(3)
2023–2024	Sacramento Republic	46	(2)
2025	Detroit City	23	(0)
- * Club domestic league appearances and goals as of October 25, 2025

Shane Wiedt (born July 19, 1995) is a retired American soccer player who played as a defender and spent most of his career on various teams in the USL Championship.

== Career ==
=== College ===
Wiedt began playing college soccer at the University of Akron in 2014, which he redshirted, but completed three seasons with Akron before transferring to the University of Pittsburgh in 2018 for his final college season.

During college, Wiedt appeared in the National Premier Soccer League with Erie Commodores in 2017. Following college in 2019, Wiedt also played with NPSL side Virginia Beach City.

=== Professional ===
On August 9, 2019, Wiedt signed for USL Championship side Loudoun United. He made his professional debut on September 7, starting in a 5–1 loss to Hartford Athletic.

On April 29, 2021, it was announced Wiedt had signed with USL Championship side Pittsburgh Riverhounds on a 1-year deal.

Wiedt joined USL Championship side Sacramento Republic on a one-year deal on January 12, 2023.

Wiedt signed with Detroit City on December 5, 2024.
