= 2019–20 Stumptown Athletic season =

Club's inaugural season in the National Independent Soccer Association

Stumptown Athletic
2019–20 NISA season
- President: Casey Carr
- Head coach: Mark Steffens
- Stadium: CSA OrthoCarolina Sportsplex; Pineville, North Carolina and Sportsplex at Matthews; Matthews, North Carolina
- NISA: Fall, East Coast Conf.: 2nd Spring: 4th
- Playoffs: Fall: Conference Final; Spring: N/A
- U.S. Open Cup: Cancelled
- Top goalscorer: League: 2 goals each: Michael Binns; Donald Benamna; Jalen Brown; All: 2 goals each: Michael Binns; Donald Benamna; Jalen Brown
- Highest home attendance: 963 (February 29 vs. San Diego)
- Lowest home attendance: 433 (October 25 vs. Atlanta)
- Average home league attendance: 633
- Biggest win: 3–1 (September 14 vs. Atlanta)
- Biggest defeat: 0–2 (September 28 vs. Miami)
Home colours

The 2019–20 Stumptown Athletic season was the club's inaugural season in the National Independent Soccer Association, a newly established third division soccer league in the United States.

== Overview ==
On October 23, 2018, NISA announced Charlotte, North Carolina as the association's third team market. On June 28, 2019, Stumptown Athletic was unveiled as one of ten founding members of the new association and one of the eight that would take part in the inaugural 2019–20 season. The team used both CSA OrthoCarolina Sportsplex in Pineville and the Sportsplex at Matthews as home venues, with the hope of making the latter its permanent home venue sometime in the future.

On July 21, the team announced Mark Steffens as its first head coach. Stumptown announced its first two player signings, Jamaica national team midfielder Michael Binns and midfielder Jared Odenbeck, in late August. Prior to the season Hummel International was announced as Stumptown's official apparel and ball supplier.

Donald Benamna became the first Stumptown player to receive and international call-up when he was rostered for the Central African Republic's October 2019 friendly against Niger. The team won, 2–0, with Benamna making his debut in the process.

On April 27, 2020, following a stoppage of play and subsequent extension due to the COVID-19 pandemic, NISA announced the cancellation of the 2020 Spring season.

== Players and staff ==
=== Roster ===
As of March 5, 2019

No.	Position	Nation	Player
1	GK	(United States) USA	Micah Bledsoe
2	DF	(Jamaica) JAM	Richardo Israel
3	DF	(United States) USA	Randy Mendoza
4	DF	(Jamaica) JAM	Sergio Campbell
5	DF	(Brazil) BRA	Gabriel Silva
6	MF	(United States) USA	Jared Odenbeck
7	MF	(United States) USA	Tate Robertson
8	MF	(Venezuela) VEN	Ismael Longo
9	MF	(Central African Republic) CTA	Donald Benamna
10	FW	(United States) USA	Ryan Peterson
11	MF	(United States) USA	Jalen Brown
12	MF	(United States) USA	Drew Yates
13	DF	(Colombia) COL	Giovani Bejarano
14	MF	(United States) USA	Josue España
16	FW	(Sierra Leone) SLE	Lamin Suma
17	DF	(United States) USA	Thomas Suchecki
18	DF	(United States) USA	Bay Kurtz
19	FW	(South Africa) RSA	Nazeem Bartman
23	DF	(Cameroon) CMR	David Koloko
33	GK	(United States) USA	Vincent Tasca

=== Technical staff ===
- (United States) Mark Steffens – Head coach
- (Zimbabwe) Patrick Daka – Assistant coach

== Friendlies ==
October 12, 2019	Stumptown Athletic	2–2	Chattanooga FC	Charlotte, North Carolina
7:04 p.m.	Grant 59' (pen.); West 64'	Chattanooga FC Highlights; Times Free Press Report	Oliveira 26, 56'	Stadium: CSA OrthoCarolina Sportsplex; Attendance: 885

October 19, 2019	Chattanooga FC	0–0	Stumptown Athletic	Chattanooga, Tennessee
6:00 p.m.		Chattanooga FC Highlights; Times Free Press Report		Stadium: Finley Stadium; Attendance: 819

February 19, 2019	Charlotte Independence	0–0	Stumptown Athletic	Matthews, North Carolina
11:00 a.m.				Stadium: Sportsplex at Matthews

== Competitions ==
=== NISA Fall season (Showcase) ===
Details for the 2019 NISA Spring season were announced July 25, 2019.

==== Standings ====
Pos	Team	Pld	W	D	L	GF	GA	GD	Pts	Qualification
1	Miami FC (O)	6	4	2	0	19	6	+13	14	East Coast Championship
2	Stumptown Athletic	6	4	0	2	13	7	+6	12	East Coast Championship
3	Atlanta SC	6	2	2	2	13	10	+3	8	
4	Philadelphia Fury	6	0	0	6	1	23	−22	0	Withdrew (Note: Philadelphia Fury withdrew after one match and forfeited their remaining matches)

Source: NISAofficial.com
(O) Play-off winners

==== Results summary ====
Overall								Home						Away					
Pld	W	D	L	GF	GA	GD	Pts	W	D	L	GF	GA	GD	W	D	L	GF	GA	GD
6	4	0	2	13	7	+6	12	2	0	1	6	4	+2	2	0	1	7	3	+4

Last updated: 9 November 2019.
Source: Match reports

==== Matches ====
September 7, 2019 1	Philadelphia Fury	P–P	Stumptown Athletic	Philadelphia, Pennsylvania
				Stadium: Franklin Field
Note: Match postponed due to Hurricane Dorian and rescheduled to November 11, 2019. Due to Philadelphia's hiatus midway through the season, this game was later officially awarded as a 0–3 win to Stumptown.

September 14, 2019 2	Atlanta SC	1–3	Stumptown Athletic	Marietta, Georgia
7:00 p.m.	Saydee (yellow card) 69'; Bartman 87'	MyCujoo Broadcast	Brown 12'; Yates (yellow card) 15', (goal) 41'; Benamna 48', (yellow card) 64'; Binns (yellow card) 66'; Bejarano (yellow card) 68'	Stadium: Lupo Family Stadium at Life University; Attendance: 112

September 22, 2019 3	Miami FC	2–1	Stumptown Athletic	Miami Shores, Florida
7:00 p.m	Griffiths 21'; Suárez 70'	Report; MyCujoo Broadcast	Benamna 35', (yellow card) 55'; Binns (yellow card) 75'	Stadium: Buccaneer Field at Barry University; Attendance: 312

September 28, 2019 4	Stumptown Athletic	0–2	Miami FC	Pineville, North Carolina
7:00 p.m.	Binns (yellow card) 38'; Silva (yellow card) 45+2'	Report; MyCujoo Broadcast	Mares 25'; Markey (yellow card) 40' (yellow-red card) 86'; Thiaw 61'	Stadium: CSA OrthoCarolina Sportsplex; Attendance: 502

October 5, 2019 5	Stumptown Athletic	3–0 (Forfeit)	Philadelphia Fury	Pineville, North Carolina
7:00 p.m.				Stadium: CSA OrthoCarolina Sportsplex

October 25, 2019 6	Stumptown Athletic	3–2	Atlanta SC	Matthews, North Carolina
7:00 p.m.	Binns 24' (pen.), 82'; Israel (yellow card) 52'; West (yellow card) 90+4'; Silva 90+5'	MyCujoo Broadcast	Koloko (yellow card) 45+2'; Toure (yellow card) 48'; Garcia (Ast. Coach) (yellow card) 53'; Otoo 66'; Bartman 71'; Bell (yellow card) 78'	Stadium: Sportsplex at Matthews; Attendance: 433

==== Playoff ====
November 9, 2019	Miami FC	3–0	Stumptown Athletic	Miami, Florida
7:00 p.m.	Martínez 28' (pen.); González 38'; Sam 45'; Heath (yellow card) 76'	Report; MyCujoo Broadcast	Campbell (red card) 90+'	Stadium: Riccardo Silva Stadium; Attendance: 1309

=== NISA Spring season ===
Details for the 2020 NISA Spring season were announced January 27, 2020.

==== Standings ====
Pos	Team	Pld	W	D	L	GF	GA	GD	Pts	Qualification
1	Oakland Roots SC	2	1	1	0	3	2	+1	4	Playoffs
2	California United Strikers FC (Q)	2	1	1	0	1	0	+1	4	Playoffs
3	Detroit City FC	1	1	0	0	2	0	+2	3	Playoffs
4	Stumptown Athletic	2	0	2	0	3	3	0	2	Playoffs
5	San Diego 1904 FC	2	0	2	0	2	2	0	2	
6	Chattanooga FC	1	0	1	0	1	1	0	1	
7	Los Angeles Force	2	0	1	1	1	3	−2	1	
8	Michigan Stars FC	2	0	0	2	1	3	−2	0	

Updated to match(es) played on March 8, 2020. Source: NISAofficial.com
(Q) Qualified for the phase indicated

==== Results summary ====
Overall								Home						Away					
Pld	W	D	L	GF	GA	GD	Pts	W	D	L	GF	GA	GD	W	D	L	GF	GA	GD
2	0	2	0	3	3	0	2	0	1	0	2	2	0	0	1	0	1	1	0

Last updated: 6 March 2020.
Source: Match reports

==== Matches ====
February 29, 2020 1	Stumptown Athletic	2–2	San Diego 1904 FC	Pineville, North Carolina
7:04 p.m.	Robertson 3'; Brown 42'; Odenbeck (yellow card) 57'	Report; MyCujoo Broadcast	Clarke (yellow card) 3'; Pérez 36'; Ramos 82'; Wright (yellow card) 86'	Stadium: CSA OrthoCarolina Sportsplex; Attendance: 963; Referee: Joshua Escobar

March 6, 2020 2	Los Angeles Force	1–1	Stumptown Athletic	Los Angeles, California
7:30 p.m	Molano (yellow card) 22'; Villalobos 64'; Ajeakwa (yellow card) 65'	MyCujoo Broadcast	España (yellow card) 26', (goal) 52'; Robertson (yellow card) 58'; Longo (yellow card) 70'; Bartman (yellow card) 84'	Stadium: Jesse Owens Stadium; Attendance: 334; Referee: Reyna Fonseca

March 14, 2020 3	Stumptown Athletic	P–P	Los Angeles Force	Pineville, North Carolina
7:04 p.m.				Stadium: CSA OrthoCarolina Sportsplex
Note: On March 12, NISA announced that it would be suspending its season 30 days due to the COVID-19 pandemic

March 21, 2020 4	San Diego 1904 FC	P–P	Stumptown Athletic	San Diego, California
7:04 p.m.				Stadium: Lincoln High School
Note: On March 12, NISA announced that it would be suspending its season 30 days due to the COVID-19 pandemic

March 28, 2020 5	Stumptown Athletic	P–P	Chattanooga FC	Matthews, North Carolina
7:04 p.m.				Stadium: Sportsplex at Matthews
Note: On March 12, NISA announced that it would be suspending its season 30 days due to the COVID-19 pandemic

April 11, 2020 6	Stumptown Athletic	P–P	Michigan Stars FC	Pineville, North Carolina
7:04 p.m.				Stadium: CSA OrthoCarolina Sportsplex
Note: On March 30, NISA announced that it would be extending its suspension of play to May 10 in accordance with CDC guidelines for COVID-19

April 18, 2020 7	Chattanooga FC	P–P	Stumptown Athletic	Chattanooga, Tennessee
7:30 p.m.				Stadium: Finley Stadium
Note: On March 30, NISA announced that it would be extending its suspension of play to May 10 in accordance with CDC guidelines for COVID-19

April 25, 2020 8	Stumptown Athletic	P–P	Oakland Roots SC	Matthews, North Carolina
7:04 p.m.				Stadium: Sportsplex at Matthews
Note: On March 30, NISA announced that it would be extending its suspension of play to May 10 in accordance with CDC guidelines for COVID-19

May 2, 2020 9	California United Strikers FC	P–P	Stumptown Athletic	Irvine, California
7:00 p.m.				Stadium: Championship Soccer Stadium
Note: On March 30, NISA announced that it would be extending its suspension of play to May 10 in accordance with CDC guidelines for COVID-19

May 9, 2020 10	Michigan Stars FC	P–P	Stumptown Athletic	Pontiac, Michigan
7:00 p.m.				Stadium: Ultimate Soccer Arenas Outdoor Stadium
Note: On March 30, NISA announced that it would be extending its suspension of play to May 10 in accordance with CDC guidelines for COVID-19

May 16, 2020 11	Stumptown Athletic	P–P	California United Strikers FC	Pineville, North Carolina
7:04 p.m.				Stadium: CSA OrthoCarolina Sportsplex
Note: On April 28, NISA announced the cancellation of the 2020 Spring season due to COVID-19

May 23, 2020 12	Oakland Roots SC	P–P	Stumptown Athletic	Oakland, California
5:10 p.m.				Stadium: Laney College
Note: On April 28, NISA announced the cancellation of the 2020 Spring season due to COVID-19

June 6, 2020 13	Stumptown Athletic	P–P	Detroit City FC	Pineville, North Carolina
7:04 p.m				Stadium: CSA OrthoCarolina Sportsplex
Note: On April 28, NISA announced the cancellation of the 2020 Spring season due to COVID-19

June 13, 2020 14	Detroit City FC	P–P	Stumptown Athletic	Hamtramck, Michigan
7:00 p.m				Stadium: Keyworth Stadium
Note: On April 28, NISA announced the cancellation of the 2020 Spring season due to COVID-19

=== U.S. Open Cup ===
Stumptown will enter the 2020 tournament with the rest of the National Independent Soccer Association teams in the Second Round. It was announced on 29 January that their first opponent would be USL Championship side Charlotte Independence. On February 3, Charlotte announced that the game at the Sportsplex at Matthews, which both teams use as a home venue, would be free for the public to attend.

April 7 Second Round	Charlotte Independence (USLC) (North Carolina)	P–P	(North Carolina) Stumptown Athletic (NISA)	Matthews, North Carolina
7:00 pm EDT				Stadium: Sportsplex at Matthews
Note: On March 13, U.S. Soccer’s Open Cup Committee announced the tournament would be temporarily suspended due to the COVID-19 pandemic

== Squad statistics ==
=== Appearances and goals ===
As of Match played 6 March 2020

Note: This includes caps for players who were subbed in during the September 14 game against Atlanta SC, which is not reflected on the Stumptown player pages but is confirmed by the team

No.	Pos	Nat	Player	Total		Fall Season		Fall Playoff		Spring Season		U.S. Open Cup	
No.	Pos	Nat	Player	Apps	Goals	Apps	Goals	Apps	Goals	Apps	Goals	Apps	Goals
Goalkeepers
1	GK	(United States) USA	Micah Bledsoe	1	0	0	0	0	0	1	0	-	-
33	GK	(United States) USA	Vincent Tasca	4	0	2	0	1	0	1	0	-	-
Defenders
2	DF	(Jamaica) JAM	Richardo Israel	5	0	4	0	1	0	0	0	-	-
3	DF	(United States) USA	Randy Mendoza	2	0	0	0	0	0	2	0	-	-
4	DF	(Jamaica) JAM	Sergio Campbell	7	0	4	0	1	0	2	0	-	-
5	DF	(Brazil) BRA	Gabriel Silva	6	0	4	0	1	0	1	0	-	-
13	DF	(Colombia) COL	Giovani Bejarano	3	0	1	0	0	0	2	0	-	-
17	DF	(United States) USA	Thomas Suchecki	0	0	0	0	0	0	0	0	-	-
18	DF	(United States) USA	Bay Kurtz	1	0	0	0	0	0	1	0	-	-
23	DF	(Cameroon) CMR	David Koloko	2	0	0	0	0	0	2	0	-	-
Midfielders
6	MF	(United States) USA	Jared Odenbeck	6	0	3	0	1	0	2	0	-	-
7	MF	(United States) USA	Tate Robertson	7	1	4	0	1	0	2	1	-	-
8	MF	(Venezuela) VEN	Ismael Longo	1	0	0	0	0	0	1	0	-	-
9	MF	(Central African Republic) CTA	Donald Benamna	4	2	2	2	0	0	2	0	-	-
11	MF	(United States) USA	Jalen Brown	7	2	4	1	1	0	2	1	-	-
12	MF	(United States) USA	Drew Yates	5	1	3	1	1	0	1	0	-	-
14	MF	(United States) USA	Josue España	6	1	3	0	1	0	2	1	-	-
Forwards
10	FW	(United States) USA	Ryan Peterson	2	0	0	0	0	0	2	0	-	-
16	FW	(Sierra Leone) SLE	Lamin Suma	6	0	4	0	1	0	1	0	-	-
19	FW	(South Africa) RSA	Nazeem Bartman	1	0	0	0	0	0	1	0	-	-
Left during season
1	GK	(United States) USA	Ian McGrane	2	0	2	0	0	0	-	-	-	-
3	MF	(Brazil) BRA	Joao Silva	5	1	4	1	1	0	-	-	-	-
8	MF	(Jamaica) JAM	Michael Binns	5	2	4	2	1	0	-	-	-	-
10	MF	(Jamaica) JAM	Anthony Grant	3	0	3	0	0	0	-	-	-	-
15	MF	(United States) USA	Nick West	5	0	4	0	1	0	-	-	-	-
17	MF	(United States) USA	Jake Rufe	3	0	2	0	1	0	-	-	-	-
18	FW	(Russia) RUS	Timur Zhividze	2	0	1	0	1	0	-	-	-	-
19	MF	(United States) USA	Diego Silva	2	0	2	0	0	0	-	-	-	-
23	DF	(United States) USA	Marcel Berry	5	0	4	0	1	0	-	-	-	-

=== Goal scorers ===
Place	Position	Nation	Number	Name	Fall Season	Fall Playoff	Spring Season	U.S. Open Cup	Total
1	MF	(Jamaica)	8	Michael Binns	2	0	-	-	2
1	MF	(Central African Republic)	9	Donald Benamna	2	0	0	-	2
1	MF	(United States)	11	Jalen Brown	1	0	1	-	2
4	MF	(Brazil)	3	Joao Silva	1	0	-	-	1
4	MF	(United States)	7	Tate Robertson	0	0	1	-	1
4	MF	(United States)	12	Drew Yates	1	0	0	-	1
4	MF	(United States)	14	Josue España	0	0	1	-	1

=== Disciplinary record ===
Number	Nation	Position	Name	Fall Season		Fall Playoff		Spring Season		U.S. Open Cup		Total	
Number	Nation	Position	Name	Booked	Sent off (straight red)	Booked	Sent off (straight red)	Booked	Sent off (straight red)	Booked	Sent off (straight red)	Booked	Sent off (straight red)
2	(Jamaica)	DF	Richardo Israel	1	0	0	0	0	0	-	-	1	0
4	(Jamaica)	DF	Sergio Campbell	0	0	0	1	0	0	-	-	0	1
5	(Brazil)	DF	Gabriel Silva	1	0	0	0	0	0	-	-	1	0
6	(United States)	MF	Jared Odenbeck	0	0	0	0	1	0	-	-	1	0
7	(United States)	MF	Tate Robertson	0	0	0	0	1	0	-	-	1	0
8	(Jamaica)	MF	Michael Binns	3	0	0	0	-	-	-	-	3	0
8	(Venezuela)	MF	Ismael Longo	-	-	-	-	1	0	-	-	1	0
9	(Central African Republic)	MF	Donald Benamna	2	0	0	0	0	0	-	-	2	0
12	(United States)	MF	Drew Yates	1	0	0	0	0	0	-	-	1	0
13	(Colombia)	DF	Giovani Bejarano	1	0	0	0	0	0	-	-	1	0
14	(United States)	MF	Josue España	0	0	0	0	1	0	-	-	1	0
15	(United States)	MF	Nick West	1	0	0	0	-	-	-	-	1	0
19	(South Africa)	FW	Nazeem Bartman	-	-	-	-	1	0	-	-	1	0

== See also ==
- 2019–20 NISA season
