= 2013 Charlotte Eagles season =

Charlotte Eagles
2013 season
- Owner: Pat Stewart
- Head Coach: Mark Steffens
- Stadium: Dickson Field, Queens University; Charlotte, North Carolina
- 2013 USL Pro season: 5th
- U.S. Open Cup: Third Round
- USL Pro Playoffs: TBD
Home colors	Away colors

The 2013 Charlotte Eagles Season will be the club's 21st year of professional soccer. It will be the team's third consecutive season in the USL Professional Division and the team will look to build on its 2012 Open Cup run from a year ago where they reached the quarterfinals.

== Current roster ==
As of Feb 28. 2013

No.	Position	Nation	Player
14	MF	(Zimbabwe) ZIM	Joseph Kabwe
24	GK	(United States) USA	Eric Reed
13	MF	(United States) USA	Matt Gold
15	MF	(United States) USA	Cuitlahuac Meza
25	GK	(United States) USA	Brock Duckworth
16	MF	(United States) USA	Drew Yates
21	DF	(Jamaica) JAM	Shaun Francis
19	MF	(United States) USA	Will Prado
4	DF	(United States) USA	Brady Bryant
29	DF	(United States) USA	Nick Courtney
28	MF	(Ghana) GHA	Samuel Asante
26	GK	(Mexico) MEX	Alonso Jimenez
12	MF	(United States) USA	Juan Guzman
10	MF	(Colombia) COL	Jorge Herrera
17	FW	(United States) USA	Christian Ramirez

== Competition ==
=== USL PRO ===
==== Results summary ====
Overall								Home						Away					
Pld	W	D	L	GF	GA	GD	Pts	W	D	L	GF	GA	GD	W	D	L	GF	GA	GD
26	10	11	5	44	39	+5	41	7	4	3	20	16	+4	3	7	2	24	23	+1

Last updated: February 28, 2013.
Source: uslsoccer.com

Round	1	2	3	4	5	6	7	8	9	10	11	12	13	14	15	16	17	18	19	20	21	22	23	24	25	26
Ground	H	H	H	H	A	H	A	A	H	A	H	H	A	A	A	A	A	H	H	H	H	H	A	H	A	A
Result	W	D	D	W	D	W	D	L	L	D	W	W	D	D	W	W	D	W	D	D	L	L	W	W	D	L

Updated to match(es) played on February 28, 2013. Source: uslsoccer.com
A = Away; H = Home; W = Win; D = Draw; L = Loss

=== Match Results ===
April 13, 2013 1	Antigua Barracuda	0–2	Charlotte Eagles	Charlotte, North Carolina
7:00pm	Kirwan (yellow card) 40'		Thornton 27'; Ramirez 85'	Stadium: Dickson Field; Attendance: 932; Referee: David McPhun

April 19, 2013 2	Rochester Rhinos	0–0	Charlotte Eagles	Charlotte, North Carolina
7:00pm			Newnam (yellow card) 82'	Stadium: Dickson Field; Attendance: 332; Referee: Charles Carson

April 23, 2013 3	Orlando City	1–1	Charlotte Eagles	Charlotte, North Carolina
7:00pm	Dwyer 8'; Braun (yellow card) 40'; Molino (yellow card) 45+'		Villasenor (yellow card) 5'; Okiomah (yellow card) 26'; Asante (yellow card) 45+'; Francis (yellow card) 72'; Newnam (yellow card) 74'; Thornton 90'	Stadium: Dickson Field; Attendance: 486; Referee: Daniel Fitzgerald

April 26, 2013 4	Pittsburgh Riverhounds	0–2	Charlotte Eagles	Charlotte, North Carolina
7:00pm			Ramirez 3'; Meza 54'	Stadium: Dickson Field; Attendance: 623; Referee: Mark Kadlecik

May 4, 2013 5	Richmond Kickers	3–3	Charlotte Eagles	Richmond, Virginia
19:00 EDT	Ownby 14'; Nyazamba 34'; Shanosky 90+2'	Report	Yates 48'; Asante (yellow card) 59'; Thornton (yellow card) 62'; Smith 79'; Francis 90+1'	Stadium: City Stadium; Attendance: 2,031; Referee: Matthew Franz

May 14, 2013 6	Charleston Battery	0–1	Charlotte Eagles	Charlotte, North Carolina
7:00pm	Falvey (yellow card) 72'; Wiltse (yellow card) 74'		Okai (yellow card) 48'; Francis 65'	Stadium: Dickson Field; Attendance: 695; Referee: Daniel Burak

May 23, 2013 7	Charlotte Eagles	2–2	Phoenix FC	Phoenix, Arizona
10:30pm	Ramirez 5'; Villsenor 35'		Morrison 17'; Toia 38'	Stadium: Sun Devil Soccer Stadium; Attendance: 1093; Referee: Juan Colazo

May 25, 2013 8	Charlotte Eagles	3–4	Los Angeles Blues	Fullerton, California
10:30pm	Herrera 44'; Herrera 81'; Smith 88'		OG 18'; Cortez 19'; Gonzalez 42'; Cortez 50'	Stadium: Titan Stadium

June 1, 2013 9	Harrisburg City Islanders	4–0	Charlotte Eagles	Charlotte, North Carolina
8:00pm	Hernandez 6'; Wheeler 18'; Wheeler 22'; McLaughlin 89'			Stadium: Dickson Field; Attendance: 1242; Referee: Daniel Burak

June 5, 2013 10	Charlotte Eagles	3–4	Charleston Battery	Charleston, South Carolina
7:00pm	Okai 14'; Yates 89'		Cordovez 61'; Kelly 69'	Stadium: Blackbaud Stadium; Attendance: 2057; Referee: Howard Ash

June 14, 2013 11	Chicago Fire U-21	1–2	Charlotte Eagles	Charlotte, North Carolina
7:00pm	Amarikwa 42'		Ramirez 70'; Newman 75'	Stadium: Dickson Field; Attendance: 1336; Referee: Dustin Thorne

June 21, 2013 12	VSI Tampa Bay	0–1	Charlotte Eagles	Charlotte, North Carolina
7:00pm			Villasenor 74'	Stadium: Dickson Field; Attendance: 741; Referee: Christopher Spivey

June 22, 2013 13	Charlotte Eagles	0–0	Wilmington Hammerheads	Wilmington, North Carolina
7:30pm				Stadium: Legion Stadium; Attendance: 2617; Referee: Jeff Davis

June 28, 2013 14	Charlotte Eagles	2–2	Dayton Dutch Lions	Dayton, Ohio
7:00pm	Ramirez 22'; Herrera 63'		DeLass 45'; Smith 85'	Stadium: Miami Valley South Stadium

June 29, 2013 15	Charlotte Eagles	2–1	Chicago Fire	Bridgeview, Illinois
TBD	Meza 3'; Francis 14'		Santos 51'	Stadium: Toyota Park; Referee: Miguel Panduro Jr

July 4, 2013 16	Charlotte Eagles	3–2	Pittsburgh Riverhounds	Pittsburgh, Pennsylvania
7:00pm	Herrera 17'; Thorton 45'; Marshall (OG) 72'		Amoo 15'; Marshall 40'	Stadium: Highmark Stadium; Referee: RON DAMBROSIA

July 6, 2013 17	Charlotte Eagles	2–2	Rochester Rhinos	Rochester, New York
7:05pm	Islas 33'; Herrera 74'		Hoxie 84'; McManus 90'	Stadium: Sahlen's Stadium; Referee: David Mon

July 13, 2013 18	Wilmington Hammerheads	2–3	Charlotte Eagles	Charlotte, North Carolina
8:00pm	Steres 6'; Nicholson 63'		Islas 31'; Herrera 68'; Meza 84'	Stadium: Dickson Field; Attendance: 1300; Referee: Abbes Monsour-Hafifi

July 20, 2013 19	Dayton Dutch Lions	0–0	Charlotte Eagles	Charlotte, North Carolina
7:00pm				Stadium: Dickson Field; Attendance: 1,032; Referee: Christopher Spivey

July 25, 2013 20	Los Angeles Blues	3–3	Charlotte Eagles	Charlotte, North Carolina
7:00pm	Spitz 11'; Cortez 34'; OG 41'	Report	Herrera 33'; Okai 45+'; Yates 90+'	Stadium: Dickson Field; Attendance: 553; Referee: McPhun

July 27, 2013 21	Phoenix FC	4–0	Charlotte Eagles	Charlotte, North Carolina
7:00pm	Paul 18'; Toia 24'; Paul 32'; Vickers 83'			Stadium: Dickson Field; Attendance: 514; Referee: Chris Spivey

August 2, 2013 22	Richmond Kickers	1–0	Charlotte Eagles	Charlotte, North Carolina
7:00pm	Ngwenya 72'			Stadium: Dickson Field; Attendance: 652; Referee: Skye Arthur-Banning

August 7, 2013 23	Charlotte Eagles	2-1	Harrisburg City Islanders	Harrisburg, Pennsylvania
7:00pm	Ramirez 27'; Herrera 38'		hernandez 6'	Stadium: Skyline Sports Complex; Attendance: 1710

August 10, 2013 24	Antigua Barracuda	0-5	Charlotte Eagles	Charlotte, North Carolina
7:00pm			Herrera 12,55'; Okai 20'; Yates 38'; Islas 88'	Stadium: Dickson Field; Attendance: 859

August 16, 2013 25	Charlotte Eagles	3-3	VSI Tampa Bay	Tampa Bay, Florida
7:30pm	Ramirez 16,43'; Okai 58'		Salles 44'; Dos Santos 63'; Burt 87'	Stadium: Corbett Soccer Stadium; Attendance: 10,215; Referee: Thompson

August 17, 2013 26	Charlotte Eagles	0-1	Orlando City	Orlando, Florida
7:30pm			Braun 50'	Stadium: Fifth Third Bank Field at the Citrus Bowl

=== USL Pro Playoffs ===
August 24, 2013 QF	Harrisburg City Islanders	1–3	Charlotte Eagles	Harrisburg, Pennsylvania
2:00 pm EDT	Pelletier (yellow card) 46'; Touray (yellow card) 52'; Basso (yellow card) 56' (red card) 81'; Mkosana 85'	Report	Ramirez 52'; Yates (yellow card) 54'; Herrera 82'; Asante 90+'	Stadium: Skyline Sports Complex; Attendance: 1,124; Referee: Eric Weisbrod

August 31, 2013 SF	Richmond Kickers	1–2	Charlotte Eagles	Richmond, Virginia
7:00 pm EDT	Callahan 11'	Report; Report	Ramirez 31'; Herrera 38'	Stadium: City Stadium; Attendance: 2,539; Referee: Jorge Gonzalez

September 7, 2013 Final	Orlando City	4–7	Charlotte Eagles	Orlando, Florida
7:30pm	Dwyer 33', 42', 61' (pen.), 69'; Chin 70', 90'; Boden (yellow card) 71'; Mbengue 85'	Report	Okiomah 20'; Ramirez 43', 58'; Meza 88'	Stadium: Fifth Third Bank Field; Attendance: 20,886; Referee: Ismail Elfath

== US Open Cup ==
=== Match Results ===
May 21, 2013 Match 30	Charlotte Eagles	3–0	Seattle Sounders FC U-23	Charlotte, North Carolina
7:00 PM EDT	Yates 67'; Herrera 67', 70'			Stadium: Queens University of Charlotte Sports Complex

May 29, 2013	Charlotte Eagles	0–2	Chicago Fire	Rock Hill, South Carolina
7:00 PM EDT	Villaseñor (yellow card) 85'	Report	Magee 11'; Soumare (yellow card) 39'; Rolfe 57'	Stadium: Winthrop University Stadium; Attendance: 1562; Referee: Lance Jacob Vanhaitsma
