= 2020–21 Stumptown AC season =

Soccer club season

Stumptown AC
2020–21 NISA season
- Interim President: Fred Matthes
- Head coach: Rod Underwood
- Stadium: Sportsplex at Matthews; Matthews, North Carolina
- NISA: Fall: Did not compete Spring: 3rd
- Playoffs: Fall: Did not compete Spring: Did not qualify
- Legends Cup: 8th place
- U.S. Open Cup: Did not qualify
- Top goalscorer: Alex McGrath: 3
- Biggest win: Stump 3–1 1904 (June 22)
- Biggest defeat: DCFC 2–0 Stump (Apr. 14, Legends Cup)

The 2020–21 Stumptown AC season was the club's second in the National Independent Soccer Association (NISA), second overall, and first under this name and management.

== Roster ==
=== Players ===
As of April 13, 2021

No.	Position	Nation	Player
1	GK	USA	Kevin Gonzalez
2	DF	USA	Bay Kurtz
3	DF	USA	Shaan Sharma
5	DF	USA	Jacob Lovinger
6	MF	USA	Quinn Mello-Bastida
7	MF	USA	Alex McGrath
8	MF	MEX	Luis Garcia Sosa
9	DF	USA	Robert Hines
10	FW	USA	Agwie Chunga
11	DF	USA	Travis Ward
12	FW	JAM	Khesanio Hall
13	DF	COL	Giovani Bejarno Navia
14	DF	USA	Dylan Greenburg
16	MF	USA	Ismael Longo
17	MF	ENG	Elliot Cutts
18	GK	USA	Hassan Kamara
19	FW	USA	Giovanni Ramos-Godoy
20	MF	USA	Jake Crim
22	DF	USA	Franky Martinez
24	FW	GAM	Salifu Jatta
26	DF	USA	Rhys Williams
29	FW	LBR	Molley Karpeh Jr.

=== Staff ===
- (Nigeria) Rod Underwood – Head coach
- (United States) Erik Imler – Assistant coach

== Competitions ==
=== 2020 Fall season ===
Initial details for the NISA Fall 2020 season were released on June 4, 2020. Prior to the season, the league announced both Stumptown Athletic and San Diego 1904 FC would go on hiatus for the fall. In early March 2021, NISA announced Stumptown AC would play in the Spring season with new ownership. American soccer executive Fred Matthes and Carrie Taylor were named team president and head of operations, respectively.

=== 2021 Spring Season ===
==== NISA Legends Cup ====
NISA announced initial spring season plans in early February 2021, including starting the season with a tournament in Chattanooga, Tennessee with a standard regular season to follow. The tournament, now called the NISA Legends Cup, was officially announced on March 10 and is scheduled to run between April 13 and 25. All nine NISA members teams take part in the Spring will be divided into three team groups. The highest placing group winner would automatically qualify for the tournament final, while the second and third highest finishing teams overall would play one-another in a semifinal to determine a second finalist.

Stumptown were drawn into Group 2 alongside California United Strikers FC and the Fall champions Detroit City FC.

===== Standings =====
Pos	Team	Pld	W	D	L	GF	GA	GD	Pts	Qualification
1	Chattanooga FC	2	2	0	0	7	1	+6	6	Advance to Legends Cup final
2	Detroit City FC	2	1	1	0	2	0	+2	4	Advance to Legends Cup semifinal
3	San Diego 1904 FC	2	1	1	0	3	2	+1	4	Advance to Legends Cup semifinal
4	Los Angeles Force	2	1	0	1	4	6	−2	3	
5	Michigan Stars FC	2	0	2	0	2	2	0	2	
6	California United Strikers FC	2	0	2	0	1	1	0	2	
7	Maryland Bobcats FC	2	0	1	1	2	3	−1	1	
8	Stumptown AC	2	0	1	1	1	3	−2	1	
9	New Amsterdam FC	2	0	0	2	2	6	−4	0	

Source: nisasoccer.com
Rules for classification: 1) points; 2) goal differential; 3) goals scored; 4) head to head; 5) goals allowed; 6) coin toss

===== Group 2 results =====
Home \ Away	CAL	DET	STU
California United Strikers FC	—	0–0	1–1
Detroit City FC		—	2–0
Stumptown AC			—

Source: nisasoccer.com
Legend: Blue = home team win; Yellow = draw; Red = away team win.

===== Matches =====
April 14, 2021 Group 2 Round 1	Detroit City FC	2–0	Stumptown AC	Chattanooga, Tennessee
12:00 p.m. EDT	Matthews 57'; Venegas (yellow card) 85'; Botello Faz	Report; Broadcast		Stadium: Finley Stadium; Referee: Rashawn Clark

April 19, 2021 Group 2 Round 2	Stumptown AC	1–1	California United Strikers FC	Chattanooga, Tennessee
5:00 p.m. EDT	Williams 6'; McGrath (yellow card) 33'; Ward (yellow card) 53'	Report; Broadcast	Lom 11'; Bryant (yellow card) 24'	Stadium: Finley Stadium

April 22, 2021	#8 Stumptown AC	1–0	#9 New Amsterdam FC	Chattanooga, Tennessee
11:00 a.m. EDT	McGrath (yellow card) 14'; Kurtz 49'; Hines (yellow card) 81'	Report; Broadcast		Stadium: Finley Stadium; Referee: Rashawn Clark

==== Regular season ====
The Spring Season schedule was announced on March 18 with each association member playing eight games, four home and four away, in a single round-robin format.

===== Standings =====
Pos	Team	Pld	W	D	L	GF	GA	GD	Pts	Qualification
1	Detroit City FC (Y, X)	8	6	2	0	14	3	+11	20	Advance to season final
2	Los Angeles Force	8	6	0	2	11	6	+5	18	Advance to spring final (Note: If either 2020 Fall Champion Detroit or 2021 Legends Cup runner-up Chattanooga finish the spring season in first place, or both teams finish in the top two, the spot in the spring final will go to the next best team.)
3	Stumptown AC	8	4	3	1	8	4	+4	15	
4	California United Strikers FC	8	4	1	3	12	10	+2	13	
5	Maryland Bobcats FC	8	3	2	3	9	8	+1	11	
6	Chattanooga FC (Z)	8	2	2	4	6	8	−2	8	Advance to spring final
7	San Diego 1904 FC	8	2	1	5	8	17	−9	7	
8	Michigan Stars FC	8	1	2	5	5	12	−7	5	
9	New Amsterdam FC	8	1	1	6	5	10	−5	4	

Source: nisasoccer.com
Rules for classification: 1) points; 2) goal differential; 3) goals scored; 4) head to head; 5) goals allowed; 6) coin toss
(X) Spring Legends Cup champion; (Y) Fall Champion, qualifies for season final; (Z) Spring Legends Cup runner-up, qualifies for spring final

===== Matches =====
May 8, 2021 Week 1	Maryland Bobcats FC	1–2	Stumptown AC	Germantown, Maryland
7:30 p.m. EDT	Cooper (yellow card) 30'; Kao (yellow card) 47'; Fane (yellow card) 60'; Banjo 76' (pen.)	Report; Broadcast	McGrath 24'; Ward (yellow card) 56', (goal) 65'; Bejarno (yellow card) 75'	Stadium: Maryland SoccerPlex; Referee: Gustavo Solorio
Note: Bejarno yellow not in report but shown on broadcast

May 12, 2021 Week 2	Stumptown AC	0–1	Los Angeles Force	Matthews, North Carolina
7:00 p.m. EDT	Chunga (yellow card) 5'; Ward (yellow card) 28'	Report; Broadcast	Chaney 12', (yellow card) 89'; Barrera (yellow card) 57'	Stadium: Sportsplex at Matthews; Referee: Brandon Gardner
Note: Match report missing Chaney yellow card in 89th minute

May 14, 2021 Week 3	New Amsterdam FC	0–1	Stumptown AC	Warwick, New York
7:00 p.m. EDT	Kafari (yellow card) 29'; Barone (yellow card) 59'; Guarnera (yellow card) 90'	Report; Broadcast	McGrath 53'; Bejarno Navia (yellow card) 87'	Stadium: Hudson Sports Complex; Referee: Luis Diego Arroyo
Note: Multiple cautions on the report are either missing or mislabeled.

May 22, 2021 Week 4	Stumptown AC	P–P	California United Strikers FC	Matthews, North Carolina
7:00 p.m. EDT				Stadium: Sportsplex at Matthews
Note: Match postponed to June 15 due to positive COVID-19 cases on Stumptown AC

June 5, 2021 Week 5	Detroit City FC	0–0	Stumptown AC	Hamtramck, Michigan
7:30 p.m. EDT	Manning (yellow card) 8'	Report; Broadcast	Hines (yellow card) 41'; Ward (yellow card) 50'; Martinez (yellow card) 72'; Kurtz (yellow card) 86'	Stadium: Keyworth Stadium; Referee: Rashawn Clark

June 15, 2021 Week 4 (Replay)	Stumptown AC	1–1	California United Strikers FC	Matthews, North Carolina
7:00 p.m. EDT	McGrath (yellow card) 29'; Giovanni Ramos-Godoy; Martinez (red card) 90+2'	Report; Broadcast	Garton Jr. 14' (Pen); Bryant (yellow card) 90+1'	Stadium: Sportsplex at Matthews; Referee: Gustavo Solario
Note: Following the match Stumptown's Franky Martinez was shown a red card which was not listed on the report but shown on stream

June 19, 2021 Week 6	Chattanooga FC	0–1	Stumptown AC	Chattanooga, Tennessee
7:30 p.m. EDT	Robertson (yellow card) 48'; Russell (yellow card) 50'; Spielman (yellow card) 89'	Report; Broadcast	Garcia Sosa 40'; Greenberg (yellow card) 52'	Stadium: Finley Stadium; Attendance: 2,485; Referee: Nicole Green
Note: Match report missing Gonzalez from Stumptown starting lineup but he is shown on the broadcast

June 22, 2021 Week 7	Stumptown AC	3–1	San Diego 1904 FC	Matthews, North Carolina
7:00 p.m. EDT	McGrath 8', (yellow card) 89'; Ward 13'; Garcia Sosa 45+3'	Report; Broadcast	Romero 10'; Ramos (yellow card) 40'	Stadium: Sportsplex at Matthews; Referee: Alexander Zhelyazkov

June 25, 2021 Week 8	Stumptown AC	0–0	Michigan Stars FC	Matthews, North Carolina
7:00 p.m. EDT	Williams (yellow card) 42'	Report; Broadcast	Schneider (yellow card) 45+1'; Abraham (yellow card) 71'	Stadium: Sportsplex at Matthews; Referee: Nicole Green
Note: Hall is marked as being subbed out on the report, should say he was subbed in

=== U.S. Open Cup ===
As a team playing in a recognized professional league, Stumptown would normally be automatically qualified for the U.S. Open Cup. However, with the 2021 edition shorted due to the COVID-19 pandemic, NISA has only been allotted 1 to 2 teams spots. On March 29, U.S. Soccer announced 2020 Fall Champion Detroit City FC as NISA's representative in the tournament.

== Squad statistics ==
As of Match played June 25, 2021

=== Appearances and goals ===
No.	Pos	Nat	Player	Total		Legends Cup		Spring Season	
No.	Pos	Nat	Player	Apps	Goals	Apps	Goals	Apps	Goals
Goalkeepers
1	GK	(United States) USA	Kevin Gonzalez	11	0	3+0	0	8+0	0
18	GK	(United States) USA	Hassan Kamara	0	0	0+0	0	0+0	0
Defenders
2	DF	(United States) USA	Bay Kurtz	8	1	1+1	1	0+6	0
3	DF	(United States) USA	Shaan Sharma	4	0	0+1	0	0+3	0
4	DF	(United States) USA	Jacob Lovinger	2	0	0+0	0	0+2	0
9	DF	(United States) USA	Robert Hines	11	0	3+0	0	8+0	0
11	DF	(United States) USA	Travis Ward	11	2	3+0	0	8+0	2
13	DF	(Colombia) COL	Giovani Bejarno Navia	11	0	3+0	0	8+0	0
14	DF	(United States) USA	Dylan Greenburg	4	0	0+1	0	3+0	0
22	DF	(United States) USA	Franky Martinez	11	0	3+0	0	8+0	0
26	DF	(United States) USA	Rhys Williams	10	1	2+0	1	8+0	0
Midfielders
6	MF	(United States) USA	Quinn Mello-Bastida	1	0	0+1	0	0+0	0
7	MF	(United States) USA	Alex McGrath	11	3	3+0	0	8+0	3
8	MF	(Mexico) MEX	Luis Garcia Sosa	11	2	3+0	0	8+0	2
16	MF	(Venezuela) VEN	Ismael Longo	2	0	1+0	0	1+0	0
17	MF	(England) ENG	Elliot Cutts	4	0	0+1	0	1+2	0
20	MF	(United States) USA	Jake Crim	11	0	3+0	0	8+0	0
Forwards
10	FW	(United States) USA	Agwie Chunga	8	0	1+1	0	2+4	0
12	FW	(Jamaica) JAM	Khesanio Hall	4	0	0+2	0	0+2	0
19	FW	(United States) USA	Giovanni Ramos-Godoy	9	1	1+2	0	4+2	1
24	FW	(The Gambia) GAM	Salifu Jatta	0	0	0+0	0	0+0	0
29	FW	(Liberia) LBR	Molley Karpeh Jr.	10	0	3+0	0	5+2	0
Left during season

=== Goal scorers ===
Place	Position	Nation	Number	Name	Legends Cup	Spring Season	Total
1	MF	(United States)	7	Alex McGrath	0	3	3
2	MF	(Mexico)	8	Luis Garcia Sosa	0	2	2
2	DF	(United States)	11	Travis Ward	0	2	2
3	DF	(United States)	2	Bay Kurtz	1	0	1
3	FW	(United States)	19	Giovanni Ramos-Godoy	0	1	1
3	DF	(United States)	26	Rhys Williams	1	0	1

=== Disciplinary record ===
Number	Nation	Position	Name	Legends Cup		Spring Season		Total	
Number	Nation	Position	Name	Booked	Sent off (straight red)	Booked	Sent off (straight red)	Booked	Sent off (straight red)
2	(United States)	DF	Bay Kurtz	0	0	1	0	1	0
7	(United States)	MF	Alex McGrath	2	0	2	0	4	0
9	(United States)	DF	Robert Hines	1	0	1	0	2	0
10	(United States)	FW	Agwie Chunga	0	0	1	0	1	0
11	(United States)	DF	Travis Ward	1	0	3	0	4	0
13	(Colombia)	DF	Giovani Bejarno Navia	0	0	2	0	2	0
14	(United States)	DF	Dylan Greenburg	0	0	1	0	1	0
22	(United States)	DF	Franky Martinez	0	0	1	1	1	1
26	(United States)	DF	Rhys Williams	0	0	1	0	1	0
