= Caribbean Football Union corruption scandal =

Sports bribery scandal

- Date: 10–11 May 2011
- Location: Port-of-Spain, Trinidad
- Participants: Jack Warner; Mohammed bin Hammam; Members of CFU
- Outcome: Resignation of Jack Warner; Suspension of Mohammad Bin Hammamofficials

The Caribbean Football Union corruption scandal involved alleged bribery attempts to gain votes of national football associations from the Caribbean Football Union in the 2011 FIFA presidential election.

The bribes were offered on 20 May 2011, at a meeting of the CFU, held in Port-of-Spain, Trinidad. The meeting had been arranged so that the president of the Asian Football Confederation, Mohammed Bin Hammam, could address representatives of the CFU, in an attempt to persuade them to vote for him in the upcoming FIFA presidential elections. As it was a meeting for the Caribbean Football Union, the CONCACAF members from Central America (UNCAF) and North America (NAFU) were not present.

The vice president of the Bahamas Football Association, Fred Lunn, reported that while attending the meeting, he had been given a brown envelope containing US$40,000, in exchange for which he was expected to vote for Bin Hammam. During the subsequent investigations, the CONCACAF president Jack Warner and various CFU officials were also implicated in the bribery. Both Warner and Bin Hammam denied any involvement.

The incident resulted in Bin Hammam's suspension and Warner's resignation, as well as the suspension of over 30 CFU vice-presidents and staff, and the investigation of over 30 national football association officials.

== Background ==
It was a sensitive time for FIFA, who had been criticised in the European press for their handling of corruption accusations, which extended to FIFA President Sepp Blatter. The Nigeria Football Federation and West African Football Union leader Amos Adamu and the Oceania Football Confederation and Tahitian Football Federation President Reynald Temarii had been banned from football for requesting payments in kind in the run-up to the 2018 and 2022 World Cup hosting bid vote. A BBC episode of Panorama had been featured showing various FIFA officials refusing to answer to allegations. There were also suspicions that Qatar (Bin Hammam's nation) had won the rights to the host the 2022 World Cup by bribing FIFA Executive Officers.

In the run-up to the FIFA Presidency elections that would place at the 61st FIFA Congress, FIFA President Sepp Blatter and his electoral opposition Mohammed Bin Hammam were expected to meet with CONCACAF delegates to persuade them whom to vote for.

Sepp Blatter met with all members of the CFU when they met on 3 May 2011 at the annual CONCACAF Congress at the JW Marriott hotel in Miami, Florida along with members of the NAFU and UNCAF. However, the Asian Football Confederation President and FIFA Presidential candidate Mohammed bin Hammam stated that he was unable to attend the meeting.

At the congress, Jack Warner retained his position as CONCACAF President having been voted in, for his sixth consecutive four-year term.

As a result of Bin Hammam's absence, it was arranged for a second meeting to be held on 10 May 2011 in the Hyatt Regency hotel, Port-of-Spain, Trinidad where Mohammed Bin Hammam could attend and address the CFU members as the majority of CONCACAF members are also members of the CFU.

== Incident ==
Anton Sealey, the President of the Bahamas Football Association was attending an event in the run-up to the 61st FIFA Congress in Zürich, Switzerland, as such, he was unable to attend a meeting in Port-of-Spain, Trinidad and Tobago.

Bahamas FA's vice president, Fred Lunn, attended the meeting, whilst there, Lunn was given brown envelope with the word "Bahamas" written on it containing US$40,000. Believing it to be a bribe in a cash-for-votes scandal, funded by bin Hammam, Lunn reported the incident to Sealey, who in turn reported it to CONCACAF General Secretary Chuck Blazer. Lunn took a photograph of the money and the envelope before returning them. He later gave journalists a digital copy of the photograph for publication.

Bahamas-based newspaper The Tribune praised Sealey and Lunn for not accepting the envelope: "The attempted bribe was an insult to the whole Caribbean. Those seeking the Caribbean Football Federation's vote obviously targeted CFU members, some of whom represented economically disadvantaged nations who would never have seen so much money as fell from the brown envelope that was offered them. Many proved to their tempters that poor they might be, but they had pride, they had integrity and although they might never see so much money again, under such tainted conditions they would never stoop so low as to pick it up. As was pointed out, $40,000 for the Caribbean's smaller islands would be the equivalent of several years' salary."

On 11 May 2011, the day after the officials had been given the envelopes, a CFU meeting had been covertly recorded by somebody from within the CFU (Warner later alleged that this Angenie Kanhai, the CFU's general secretary). The video's audio included Warner telling CFU members that Bin Hammam offered to bring "silver plaques and wooden trophies and bunting and so on" as a gift for each member and that Warner suggested Bin Hammam should bring cash.

Warner said that he'd told Bin Hammam to pay the CFU directly and the CFU would distribute the cash to its members. Warner also told members that if they were uneasy about accepting the money, that they could return it to him and that "if you are pious go to a church friends, but the fact is that our business is our business"

== Investigation ==
Eric Labrador, President of the Puerto Rican Football Federation stated that he accepted the money as it came from a CFU official and not from Bin Hammam. Labrador also stated that he requested a letter from a CFU official to show the Trinidad customs division that the money was for footballing development in Puerto Rico. He reported the incident upon hearing that FIFA did not know about the incident.

CONCACAF general secretary, Chuck Blazer, asked Chicago-based US Federal Prosecutor John Collins of Collins and Collins to investigate into the events that took place at the Hyatt Regency hotel.

The interviews were to take place in Miami and be conducted by former FBI director Louis Freeh of the Freeh Group. Warner refused to be interviewed: "I have not received any summons asking me to speak with them [the investigators] nor do I plan to do so". Warner suspected an American conspiracy as Chuck Blazer, John Collins and Louis Freeh are all American citizens: "I'm not going to back a complaint made by an American and investigated by Americans and an attempt to put it on American soil because the complaint is from Miami,"

The CFU general secretary, 28-year-old Trinidadian Angenie Kanhai, agreed to give evidence at the FIFA hearing. The evidence detailed Warner's instruction to deliver "gifts" of sealed envelopes, said to contain cash, to each of the delegates. Several other members of the CFU had refused to do so.

Louis Giskus, president of the Surinaamse Voetbal Bond also stated that he had been given an envelope: "We went up to a room and were given $40,000 in a brown envelope with the name of Surinam on it," Other CFU leaders, reportedly from the Bahamas, Bermuda, the Cayman Islands and the Turks and Caicos Islands, also described attempts to give them identical amounts of money.

In his defence, Bin Hammam claimed that the $40,000 was to cover travel, 'accommodation expenses and "administrative costs" of the meeting'. Warner and 12 other member associations claimed that no money was given and that "the allegations are entirely false".

=== Trinidadian police reaction ===
Transparency international and the political party 'People's National Movement' (Warner's political opponents) both called for the Trinidad police to launch an investigation into the bribery claims. Trinidadian Police Commissioner Dwayne Gibbs was also expected to investigate the bribery claims. Gibbs stated that as there had been no official complaint, there was nothing to investigate, he stated that if there was an investigation to be made, it would be conducted by the Customs and Excise Division as according to Trinidadian law, only amounts up to $5,000 can be carried out of the country as baggage.

Keith Rowley, leader of the 'People's National Movement', accused Gibbs of sitting on his hands and "pandering to the political directorate".

== Aftermath of Warner's resignation ==
=== Struggle for CONCACAF control ===
CONCACAF Executive Committee
Position	Name
President	(Trinidad and Tobago) Jack Warner (CFU)
Vice President	(Barbados) Lisle Austin (CFU)
Vice President	(Honduras) Alfredo Hawit (UNCAF)
	(United States) Sunil Gulati (NAFU)
	(Panama) Ariel Alvaredo (UNCAF)
	(Mexico) Guillermo Canedo (NAFU)
	(Jamaica) Horace Burrell (CFU)

Jack Warner resigned from his position as CONCACAF president after being reported to FIFA by the American CONCACAF General Secretary Chuck Blazer. This automatically led to 71-year-old Barbadian Lisle Austin being installed as Acting President.

Austin's first act was to attempt to sack Blazer for his role in the removal of Warner. A statement was published on the CONCACAF website stating that Austin did not have the authority to sack Blazer. In response, Austin quoted article 29 from the CONCACAF Statutes that states, "The President has the judicial and extrajudicial representation of CONCACAF."

As CONCACAF is a registered not-for-profit company in Barbados, Austin sought an injunction from the Barbadian court which would prevent Chuck Blazer and the executive committee from becoming de facto head of CONCACAF.

The Bahamian judge Stephen Isaacs granted an injunction which told CONCACAF to desist "from interfering with Lisle Austin in the discharge of his duties as acting president".

Austin also attempted to prevent the CONCACAF using counsel Michael Collins, who had helped put the investigation together.

Austin was banned from CONCACAF office in New York and suspended from administrating in football in the CONCACAF region for doing so. The letter was signed by Collins, whom Austin had sought the removal of.

Undeterred, Austin released a public statement stating that CONCACAF took pride in flouting the court decision. He complained that his suspension shouldn't be official, as "the presence of four (4) Executive Committee members in the hotel room of Mr. Blazer does not constitute an Executive Committee meeting."

Austin was banned by FIFA from administrating in football for one year for attempting to challenge CONCACAF's decision in the Barbadian civil courts. Austin lasted just four days as president of CONCACAF and the CFU.

In October 2011, the second most influential member of the CFU; CFU's vice-president and Jamaica Football Federation President Horace Burrell was suspended by FIFA for six months (three months of which were suspended).

With Burrell's suspension, all three Caribbean members of CONCACAF had been suspended due to the scandal. Honduran Alfredo Hawit was appointed as acting President of CONCACAF, becoming the first non-Caribbean CONCACAF President since 1990.

=== CFU Presidency ===
In addition to Austin and Burrell's suspensions, another CFU vice-president, Guyana FA's President Colin Klass was suspended for 26 months.

Due to the additional suspension of Klass, and the resignation of Lionel Haven, the Haitian Football Federation President Yves Jean-Bart became acting president of the CFU.

=== Relocation of headquarters ===
CFU general secretary Angenie Kanhai had been prevented from entering the CFU office (owned by Jack Warner) in Port-of-Spain due to her compliance at the FIFA Ethics Committee hearing. She relocated and worked whilst stationed at the CONCACAF headquarters in Miami, United States, outside of the CFU's remit.

In an open letter Jack Warner made accusations of conspiracy in an open letter; "I will also give you detailed accounts of the conspiracy against the CFU by one of its own, who secretly videotaped that meeting for Chuck Blazer and was rewarded with an office in Miami and a higher salary and who unilaterally moved the CFU’s 33-year-old office from Port of Spain to Miami so that every Caribbean official wanting to do football business in the Caribbean had to get a US visa."

Harold Taylor, a Trinidadian CFU presidential candidate questioned the thought behind the moving the CFU headquarters to Miami. "The office of the Secretariat is in the territory where the General Secretary resides. The General Secretary is from Trinidad, so how can you have the Secretariat in Miami? It is unthinkable to have a CFU office in Miami ... too many members in the CFU must get a visa to go to Miami and some of them cannot even get visas and you have at least one permanent member of the Union who can’t even go to the US, so how could you put the office in Miami,".

Kanhai resigned from her position in December 2011: "I regret to have taken this decision at a time such as now, a period of upheaval and change, but I was forced to face, like all of you, the emotional, psychological and physical toll paid over the last months,"

=== Delayed congress ===
An extraordinary general meeting for the CFU was scheduled for 20 November 2011 in Montego Bay, Jamaica. Four representatives expressed an interest in becoming the CFU president. These were the suspended Horace Burrell (Jamaica), Tony James (Jamaica), former CFU secretary Harold Taylor (Trinidad) and Gordon Derrick (Antigua and Barbuda). It was also suggested that Yves Jean-Bart (Haiti) and Luis Fernandez (Cuba) may express an interest in the position.

As a result of his Burrell's suspension, it was questioned whether he was eligible to be a candidate for the vote. Burrell's suspension would end on 16 January 2012. The congress meeting was delayed and rescheduled for 15 February 2012, after Burrell's suspension had elapsed. The congress never took place.

Horace Burrell, the front-runner for the presidency position announced that he would not put his name forward for CONCACAF presidency and that he would prefer to become CFU president. He recommended the Cayman Islands Football Association president and his business partner Jeffrey Webb for the CONCACAF role. Derrick was voted in as CFU president in May 2012.

== FIFA investigation outcome ==
In 2011, 31 members of the CFU were investigated by the 'FIFA Ethics Committee' due to the cash-for-votes scandal. The outcome of those investigations are shown in the table below.

The general secretary and whistleblower Chuck Blazer was also investigated by FIFA. An accusation of racism was made, a letter from the Jamaica Football Federation noted that Blazer only told Caribbean officials they were being investigated said that Blazer "discriminated against Capt Burrell and certain members of the Concacaf through his contemptuous and denigratory words since all the persons who were singled out were of a specific race". Blazer had also told Burrell he could not become vice-president of CONCACAF as he was being investigated by FIFA. Blazer was given a warning by FIFA as the investigations into the CFU officials had not yet began when he told people they were under investigation.

Name	Position	Investigation outcome
(United States) Chuck Blazer	CONCACAF General Secretary	Warning
(Trinidad and Tobago) Jack Warner	CFU President, CONCACAF President	Resigned, no action taken.
(Qatar) Mohammed Bin Hammam	AFC President	Banned indefinitely
(Trinidad and Tobago) Debbie Minguell	CFU Official	Banned from football for one year
(Trinidad and Tobago) Jason Sylvester	CFU Official	Banned from football for one year
(Anguilla) Damien Hughes		No violation committed
(Barbados) David Hinds		Warning
(Barbados) Mark Bob Forde		Warning
(British Virgin Islands) Franka Pickering		Banned from football 18 months.
(British Virgin Islands) Aubrey Liburd		Reprimand and a fine of CHF300
(Cayman Islands) David Frederick		Resigned, no action taken
(Dominican Republic) Osiris Guzman		Banned for 30 days (15 days suspended) and a fine of CHF300
(Dominican Republic) Felix Ledesma		No violation committed
(Trinidad and Tobago) Oliver Camps		Resigned, no action taken
(The Bahamas) Lionel Haven		Resigned, no action taken
(Guyana) Colin Klass		Banned from football for 26 months.
(Guyana) Noel Adonis		Banned for 30 days and a fine of CHF300
(Haiti) Yves Jean-Bart		Warning
(Jamaica) Horace Burrell		Banned from football for six months (three months suspended).
(Jamaica) Horace Reid		Warning
(Saint Kitts and Nevis) Anthony Johnson		Reprimand and a fine of CHF300
(Saint Lucia) Patrick Mathurin		Resigned, no action taken
(Saint Vincent and the Grenadines) Joseph Delves		Resigned, no action taken
(Saint Vincent and the Grenadines) Ian Hypolite		Banned for 30 days (15 days suspended) and a fine of CHF300
(Trinidad and Tobago) Richard Groden		Warning
(United States Virgin Islands) Hillaren Frederick		Reprimand and a fine of CHF300
(Dominica) Philippe White		No violation committed
(Dominica) Patrick John		Banned from football for 2 years and received a fine of CHF 3,000.
(Montserrat) Vincent Cassell		Banned from football for 60 days and received a fine of CHF 300.
(Anguilla) Raymond Guishard		Banned from football for 45 days and received a fine of CHF 300.
(Montserrat) Tandica Hughes		Banned from football for 15 days
(Antigua and Barbuda) Everton Gonsalves		Banned from football for seven days and received a fine of CHF 300.
(Antigua and Barbuda) Derrick Gordon		Reprimand and a fine of CHF 300.

In July 2012, the former Dominican prime minister Patrick John was banned from presiding over the Dominica Football Association for his part in the corruption scandal. A vote was carried out by the Dominican football club association.

=== Warner's response ===
In August 2011, Warner stated that he saw the investigation as an assault on the Caribbean nations asking "why is FIFA targeting the Caribbean, why is FIFA going after the Caribbean leadership."

Later that year, Warner described the rebuilding process as a "coup d'etat" and described the investigation as "unethical" and "immoral". He referred to the CFU members who had worked with FIFA as "cowardly men and women". During his time as CFU President, Warner had also acted as a whip since 1983 priding himself on delivering a unified 'Caribbean-bloc' vote, he felt that the CFU were now ready to "accept the crumbs of the FIFA President when in the very recent past these same men and women used to dine at his table as equals".

He said: "In one fell swoop, the Caribbean football leadership has now undone its struggle of some 33 years and has disrespected the entire region!"

Warner described FIFA as arrogant and that they would "ride roughshod over duly appointed officials of both the CFU and the CONCACAF". He stated that those CFU members complying with FIFA would "destroy an entire region for their own selfish and self-serving motives"

=== Bin Hammam's legal challenge ===
On 29 May 2011, FIFA's ethics committee suspended Bin Hammam temporarily from all football-related activity pending the outcome of a full inquiry into accusations that they offered financial incentives to members of the Caribbean Football Union. Bin Hammam said that he would appeal against the committees decision to provisionally ban him from football related activity, saying that "The way these proceedings have been conducted is not compliant with any principles of justice." He also issued a statement calling for his reinstatement as well as responding to the claims in detail.

On 23 July 2011, Bin Hammam was banned for life from all football activities by a five-member panel of the FIFA Ethics committee chaired by Petrus Damaseb. The committee found that his actions violated the organization' ethics rules after studying the reports of investigators and hearing the testimony of witnesses from the May 2011 meeting who were also cross examined by Bin Hammam's legal representatives. Bin Hammam appealed against his ban, his appeal was rejected by the FIFA Appeal Committee.

His ban from football resulted in his loss of position as the President of the Asian Football Confederation, having been replaced by Zhang Jilong of China on a temporary basis, although Zhang Jilong has since announced that he'd like to remain as AFC Presidency.

In July 2012, the Court of Arbitration for Sport ruled in Mohammed Bin Hamman's favour, canceling his lifetime ban. CAS referred to it as "...a situation of 'case not proven,'" because FIFA didn't have documentation of monies being transferred and thus "the investigation was not complete or comprehensive enough to fill the gaps in the record". The court added that it "is not making any sort of affirmative finding of innocence in relation to Mr. Bin Hammam".

Bin Hammam said: "I'm very happy because I've been able to prove that all the allegations against me were false and were intended to tarnish my reputation."
