= St. Elizabeth Technical High School =

Location
- 90 Main Street; Santa Cruz, Saint Elizabeth; Jamaica
- Coordinates: 18.0512°N 77.6947°W

Information
- Other name: STETHS
- Type: Secondary school
- Motto: Work and Integrity
- Established: 1961
- Principal: Keith Wellington
- Grades: 7–13
- Gender: Co-educational
- Houses: Wray; Roper; Watson; Pottinger
- Colours: Blue and Yellow
- Website: www.steths.edu.jm

St. Elizabeth Technical High School (STETHS) is a co-educational secondary school in Santa Cruz, Saint Elizabeth, Jamaica.

== History ==
The idea of building a Technical secondary school in Santa Cruz was initiated by the 'Santa Cruz Citizen's Association in 1958. Various pleas were made to the country's Ministry of Education, in addition to the Kaiser Bauxite Company. They later received a ten-thousand-pound grant from the Ministry and twelve acres of land from Kaiser Bauxite to start the project. The Minister of Education at the time, Hon. F. L. Glasspole, decided that St. Elizabeth Technical High School was to be built with an opening date set in early 1961. The first batch of students was chosen before the groundbreaking ceremony.

Before the school was built, E.G. Roper was appointed principal as of 1 January 1961. The school opened with 110 students on 10 October 1961, all housed in one building. Under the direction of Mr. Roper, a school choir and sports program were developed.

The school encountered problems in the early years, such as lack of equipment, insufficient water supply, and insufficient boarding accommodation in the community. The members of staff together with Kaiser Bauxite Company contributed twelve thousand pounds to help alleviate the problems.

In 1962 evening classes commenced with an enrollment of 36 students. A year later Kaiser Bauxite Company lent tents and the second intake of students was made possible. At the end of the summer term the Workshop, Arts and Craft, Laboratory, and Home Economics blocks were added to the school building.

On 27 January 1964, 112 new students were admitted and in September that year a new classroom block was completed and for the first time, students registered on the first day of the term. In 1962 the Administrative staff moved from two to four and the Academic staff from seven to twenty-five.

Esso Standard Oil Company donated funds for a Movie Projector, Power Saw, and other equipment. The Emanuel Brothers of Santa Cruz gave two scholarships, one for a boy in Agriculture to the Jamaica School of Agriculture and the other for a girl to pursue Home Economics at Church Teachers College, Mandeville.

In 1966, E. G. Roper left to take up a position as Headmaster at Kingston Technical High School and was succeeded by J.C. Wray. J. A. Pottinger was appointed principal in 1970 to replace Wray, who left for Alcan. In 1987, Samuel Watson became the principal until his retirement in 1999. Dorothy Samuda succeeded as the first female principal until 2008 when she was succeeded by current principal, Keith Wellington.

The student enrolment rose to five hundred and thirty-eight with fifteen forms. In 1971, the Ministry of Education started construction of the Junior Secondary Department. In 1972 the student enrolment stood at eleven hundred with the completion of the Junior Secondary Department. The curriculum was consequently widened to include such subjects as Arts, Science, and other Industrial and Vocational areas. The Board of Governors allocated funds for the construction of a road, the installation of electric fans in the auditorium, and the fencing of the playing field.

== Notable alumni ==
- Horace Burrell, President of the Jamaica Football Federation
- Deshorn Brown, professional footballer
- Dinsdale Morgan, Olympic hurdler
- Lovel Palmer, professional footballer
- Daren Powell, professional cricketer
- Shericka Williams, Olympic sprinter
- Khesanio Hall, Professional Footballer
- Ian Weakley, Olympic Hurdler
