= Khesanio Hall =

Jamaican footballer (born 1994)

Personal information
- Date of birth: 10 October 1994 (age 32)
- Place of birth: Santa Cruz, Jamaica
- Height: 6 ft 2 in (1.88 m)
- Position: Striker

Youth career
- 2010–2014: St. Elizabeth Technical High School

College career
Years	Team	Apps	(Gls)
2014	Oklahoma Wesleyan Eagles	15	(4)
2015–2016	Northeastern Huskies	25	(4)
2019	Oklahoma Wesleyan Eagles	24	(26)

Senior career*
Years	Team	Apps	(Gls)
2015	Ocean City Nor'easters	13	(9)
2016	Seacoast United Phantoms	3	(2)
2018–2020	GPS Portland Phoenix	19	(6)
2021	Stumptown AC	2	(0)

International career^{‡}
2013	Jamaica	1	(0)
- * Club domestic league appearances and goals as of 25 July 2021 ‡ National team caps and goals as of 18:00, 6 August 2015 (UTC)

Khesanio Hall (born 10 October 1994) is a Jamaican footballer.

== Early and personal life ==
Hall was born on 10 October 1994 in Jamaica; he has two siblings.

== Career ==
=== Youth and college ===
Hall played for St. Elizabeth Technical High School in Jamaica, graduating in 2013. He was named MVP and leading goal scorer of the DaCosta Cup of the Jamaican Schoolboy Football League. He started his college career the United States at Oklahoma Wesleyan University in 2014, transferred to Northeastern University in 2015, graduating in 2018. He returned to Oklahoma Wesleyan University in 2019 for his final year of eligibility, earning Player of the Week three times, KCAC Offensive Player of the Year, KCAC First Team, and NAIA First Team All American.

=== Senior ===
While also still attending college he played in the Premier Development League for the Ocean City Nor'easters, scoring 9 goals in 13 appearances in the 2015 season and was named Nor'easters' Offensive Player of the Year and to the PDL Eastern Conference Team. Between graduating Northeastern University and starting graduate school back at Oklahoma Wesleyan University, he played in the USL League Two for GPS Portland Phoenix, where he was a goal leader for the 2018 season.

In April 2021, Hall joined National Independent Soccer Association side Stumptown AC ahead of the spring 2021 season. He went on to make four appearances with the team, including two in the Legend's Cup, before departing in July following the conclusion of the season.

=== International ===
Hall made his senior international debut for Jamaica in 2013.
