= Diego Silva (soccer, born 1997) =

Argentine-born American soccer player

Personal information
- Full name: Diego Silva
- Date of birth: March 13, 1997 (age 29)
- Place of birth: Buenos Aires, Argentina
- Height: 1.72 m (5 ft 8 in)
- Positions: Midfielder; full back

Youth career
- Defensores Del Dorado
- Racing Club
- Real Salt Lake

College career
Years	Team	Apps	(Gls)
2015–2016	Maryland Terrapins	18	(0)

Senior career*
Years	Team	Apps	(Gls)
2018	FC Tucson	2	(0)
2019	Ogden City	0	(0)
2019	Park City Red Wolves	3	(0)
2019	Stumptown Athletic	2	(0)

International career
2014–2015	United States U18		
2016	United States U20		
- * Club domestic league appearances and goals as of October 31, 2019

Diego Silva (born March 13, 1997) is a footballer who most recently played as a midfielder for Stumptown Athletic in the NISA. Born in Argentina, Silva represents the United States internationally.

== Career ==
=== Youth ===
Silva played in his native Argentina with Defensores Del Dorado and later spent two years with Racing Club, before moving to the United States. In the United States, Silva joined the Real Salt Lake academy for three years.

=== College and amateur ===
Silva went to play two years of college soccer at the University of Maryland in 2015 and 2016.

In 2018, Silva spent the season with USL PDL side FC Tucson, making two appearances and tallying two assists.

Silva remained in the USL PDL, now rebranded as USL League Two, in 2019. Initially signing for Ogden City SC, but later moving to Park City Red Wolves, where he made three appearances for the club.

=== Professional ===
In July 2019, Silva signed for NISA side Stumptown Athletic ahead of the league's inaugural season.
