= Stephen Cruickshank =

Trinidadian soccer player

Personal information
- Full name: Stephen Cruickshank
- Date of birth: September 10, 1983 (age 43)
- Place of birth: Bointcumana, Trinidad and Tobago
- Height: 5 ft 8 in (1.73 m)
- Position: Defender

Senior career*
Years	Team	Apps	(Gls)
2006	Caledonia AIA		
2007	Cleveland City Stars	2	(0)
2008	St. Ann's Rangers		
2008	Ma Pau		
2009	Cleveland City Stars	6	(0)

International career^{‡}
2004–	Trinidad and Tobago	4	(0)
- * Club domestic league appearances and goals as of 22 October 2009 ‡ National team caps and goals as of 30 April 2009

Stephen Cruickshank (born September 10, 1983 in Bointcumana) is a Trinidadian soccer player, currently without a club.

== Career ==
=== Professional ===
Cruickshank began his professional career in Trinidad with Caledonia AIA in 2006. He first moved to the Cleveland City Stars in 2007, playing in two matches and recording 18 minutes of USL Second Division play, but missed much of the season with a high ankle sprain.

He returned to Trinidad in 2008, playing for St. Ann's Rangers and Ma Pau, before re-joining the Cleveland City Stars in the USL First Division in 2009.

=== International ===
Cruickshank has been capped four times by the Trinidad and Tobago national football team.

== Personal ==
Cruikshank is greatly involved with Athletes in Action, a Christian sports ministry organization associated with the Campus Crusade for Christ, and acts as a director of the organization's Rising Stars program.
