= Sergio Campbell =

Jamaican footballer (born 1992)

Personal information
- Full name: Sergio Akeen Campbell
- Date of birth: 16 January 1992 (age 34)
- Place of birth: Clarendon, Jamaica
- Positions: Defender; midfielder

Team information
- Current team: Stumptown Athletic
- Number: 4

Youth career
- Portmore United
- 2007–2011: Clarendon College

College career
Years	Team	Apps	(Gls)
2011	Central Arkansas Bears	8	(0)
2012–2014	Connecticut Huskies	64	(0)

Senior career*
Years	Team	Apps	(Gls)
2015	Columbus Crew SC	1	(0)
2015	→ Austin Aztex (loan)	2	(0)
2016	Pittsburgh Riverhounds	26	(0)
2017	Rochester Rhinos	13	(0)
2018	AFC Ann Arbor	0	(0)
2019–	Stumptown Athletic	6	(0)

International career^{‡}
2010–	Jamaica	6	(0)
Medal record
Men's football
Representing Jamaica
CONCACAF Gold Cup
Runner-up	2017 United States	Team
- * Club domestic league appearances and goals as of 18 March 2020 ‡ National team caps and goals as of 03:39, 18 June 2020 (UTC)

Sergio Akeen Campbell (born 16 January 1992) is a Jamaican international footballer who plays as a defender for Stumptown Athletic in the National Independent Soccer Association.

== Career ==
=== Youth and club ===
Campbell began his career playing school boy football for Clarendon College. After completing secondary school, Campbell then played for University of Central Arkansas in the USA. Campbell transferred to the UConn Huskies at the University of Connecticut in August 2012.

On 15 January 2015, Campbell was selected by the Columbus Crew in the 2015 MLS SuperDraft. Campbell was the 19th pick in the First Round of the draft. In late January, Campbell was the center of a dispute between his former club Portmore United and MLS. The Jamaican club want training compensation as Campbell was trained by United prior to moving to the United States. Campbell is the nephew of Rodolph Austin. On 12 February 2016 Campbell was waived by Columbus. On 1 April 2016 Campbell was cleared to play for the Pittsburgh Riverhounds.

=== International career ===
He made his international debut for Jamaica in 2010, coming on as a second-half substitute against Guyana in Group I of the 2010 Caribbean Cup. In the next match of the Caribbean Cup, against Grenada in the semi-final, he received a red card after coming on as an extra-time substitute.
