= Terrence McAllister =

Trinidad and Tobago international footballer

Personal information
- Full name: Terrence McAllister
- Date of birth: 11 May 1984 (age 42)
- Place of birth: Arima, Trinidad and Tobago
- Height: 6 ft 0 in (1.83 m)
- Position: Midfielder

Senior career*
Years	Team	Apps	(Gls)
2002–2008	Joe Public		
2009	Cleveland City Stars	0	(0)

International career^{‡}
	Trinidad and Tobago U-17	23	(0)
	Trinidad and Tobago U-20	5	(0)
2008–	Trinidad and Tobago	1	(0)
- * Club domestic league appearances and goals as of 22 October 2009 ‡ National team caps and goals as of 1 May 2009

Terrence McAllister (born May 11, 1984 in Arima) is a Trinidadian soccer player, currently without a club.

== Career ==
=== Professional ===
McAllister began his professional career in Trinidad, playing with the successful Joe Public club from 2002 to 2008, winning the 2006 TT Pro League title and the 2007 Trinidad and Tobago Cup. He was in the Joe Public squad that defeated the New England Revolution in the CONCACAF Champions League in September 2008.

He joined the Cleveland City Stars in the USL First Division in 2009 after a successful trial.

=== International ===
McAllister has played for the Trinidad and Tobago national football team at U-17 and U-20 level. He made his debut for the full national team in January 2008 where he started in a 2-1 defeat of Guyana.
