= Michael Ricketts (football administrator) =

Jamaican football administrator

President of the Jamaican Football Federation
- Incumbent
- Assumed office 2017
- Preceded by: Horace Burrell

South Central Confederation

Personal details
- Occupation: sports administrative

Michael Ricketts is a Jamaican football administrator who previously served as chairman South Central Confederation, president Clarendon Football Association and vice president until 2017 where he became president, completing the short term left by president Captain Horace Burrell who had died, a short term till 2019 before he continued as an elected president Jamaican Football Federation.
