= Lamin Suma =

Sierra Leonean footballer (born 1991)

Personal information
- Full name: Lamin Suma
- Date of birth: 14 July 1991 (age 35)
- Place of birth: Freetown, Sierra Leone
- Height: 1.81 m (5 ft 11 1/2 in)
- Position: Right winger

Team information
- Current team: Stumptown Athletic
- Number: 16

Senior career*
| Years | Team | Apps | (Gls) |
| 2009–2010 | Mighty Blackpool | 7 | (3) |
| 2011 | Kallon Freetown | 15 | (7) |
| 2011–2013 | Jagodina | 4 | (0) |
| 2012–2013 | → Jedinstvo B. Polje (loan) | 7 | (0) |
| 2013 | Flora Tallinn | 3 | (1) |
| 2013 | → Flora II | 5 | (3) |
| 2014 | Atlantis | 5 | (2) |
| 2015 | SGFC Eagles Maryland | 25 | (17) |
| 2016 | Philadelphia Fury | 10 | (15) |
| 2017 | Sacramento Republic | 5 | (0) |
| 2018 | Fresno FC | 0 | (0) |
| 2018–2019 | Mqabba | 21 | (4) |
| 2019– | Stumptown Athletic | 5 | (0) |

International career^{‡}
- Sierra Leone U-17
- Sierra Leone U20
- Sierra Leone U23
- * Club domestic league appearances and goals as of March 18, 2020 ‡ National team caps and goals as of December 5, 2016

Lamin Suma (born 14 July 1991) is a Sierra Leonean footballer who plays as a midfielder for Stumptown Athletic in the National Independent Soccer Association.

== Club career ==
Born in Freetown, he was playing with Mighty Blackpool F.C. until summer 2011 when he moved to another Sierra Leone National Premier League side FC Kallon.

In November 2011 he went to Turkey where he joined Süper Lig side Eskişehirspor on trials. He developed a good relation with club's coach Michael Skibbe and the prospects of Suma getting a contract looked good, however the sudden departure of Skibbe from Eskişehirspor left Suma with his future uncertain and Serbian side FK Jagodina moved in and offered him a contract.

Lamin Suma made his Serbian SuperLiga debut on March 31, 2012, as a substitute in a 21-round match visiting FK Vojvodina, a 0-0 draw. He made a total of 3 appearances in the 2011–12 Serbian SuperLiga. In August 2012 he agreed to a loan to Montenegrin First League side FK Jedinstvo Bijelo Polje where he played the 2012–13 season.

In summer 2013 he moved to Estonia and joined Meistriliiga side FC Flora Tallinn. In 2014, he moved to Finnish third-tier side Atlantis FC.

After playing in Europe, Suma moved across the Atlantic to the United States and joined SGFC Eagles Maryland in 2015, a semi professional side playing in American Soccer League, in March 2016, he signed a short-term deal until summer with Philadelphia Fury. Philadelphia Fury ended the season as champions, and Suma won the best player award of the 2016 Spring season of the American Soccer League. As result, Suma signed with Sacramento Republic FC on December 5, 2016, a club playing a level higher, in the United Soccer League.

On 21 December 2017, Suma signed with USL side Fresno FC ahead of their inaugural season in the league.

== National team ==
Lamin Suma has played for all categories of the Sierra Leonian youth national team, namely, the U-17, U-20 and U-23 teams. He was the captain of the Sierra Leone U-20 team. On May 19, 2011, he received a call by Christian Cole to the Sierra Leone national football team however he was later dropped by Lars Matsson.

== Personal life ==
Lamin Suma is the younger brother of Sheriff Suma, also a footballer.

== External sources ==
- Profile at FK Jagodina official website
- Lamin Suma at Srbijafudbal
