= Cleveland City Stars =

- Full name: Cleveland City Stars
- Nicknames: City Stars, City
- Founded: 2006
- Dissolved: 2009
- Stadium: Middlefield Cheese Stadium; Bedford, Ohio
- Capacity: 5,000
- Owner: Jonathan Ortlip
- Head Coach: Rod Underwood
- League: USL First Division
- 2009: Regular season: 11th Playoffs: DNQ
Home colors	Away colors

The Cleveland City Stars were an American professional soccer team based in Cleveland, Ohio, United States. Founded in 2006, the team played in the USL First Division (USL-1), the second tier of the American Soccer Pyramid in 2009. The club folded soon after the 2009 season.

The team played its home games at Bearcat Stadium (renamed Middlefield Cheese Stadium for sponsorship purposes) on the campus of Bedford High School in nearby Bedford, Ohio, where they played in 2009. The team's colors were green, black and white. Their final head coach was Rod Underwood.

== History ==
The Cleveland City Stars were founded in 2006 as a member of the USL Second Division and played their inaugural season in 2007. The team found success early on, going undefeated for the first nine games before losing to the Charlotte Eagles in the tenth game of the season. They ended the regular season undefeated at home, and clinched the second seed for the USL-2 play-offs, where they progressed to the semi-final, and lost to eventual champions Harrisburg 1–0 after extra time.

The team's success continued in 2008 as they finished the regular season unbeaten at home. City posted a 10–3–7 record, which proved good enough for third place in the USL Second Division, and playoff qualification. They faced the Western Mass Pioneers in the quarterfinals and won 4–2. They traveled to Richmond for the semi-final and won 1–0 after extra time. The City Stars hosted the championship game and defeated Charlotte 2–1 for the team's first championship.

During 2007 & 2008 season the Cleveland City Stars operated a reserve team that competed against PDL, international & other U23 teams. The program was lead and coached by Kent Manson, James Jaggard and Marcelo Galvao.

On December 4, 2008, the first team announced that they would compete in the USL First Division for the 2009 season. The City Stars had been the only USL Second Division team with a local television contract and had won awards for their executive organization.

Soon after the end of the 2009 USL First Division season, the City Stars club folded due to financial issues.

== Players ==
=== Final roster ===
Note: Flags indicate national team as defined under FIFA eligibility rules; some limited exceptions apply. Players may hold more than one non-FIFA nationality.

No.	Pos.	Nation	Player
0	GK	USA	Evan Bush
1	GK	USA	Hunter Gilstrap
2	DF	USA	Anthony Peters
3	MF	USA	Eric Carpenter
4	DF	MLI	Ibrahim Kante
6	FW	USA	Kolby LaCrone
7	MF	USA	Gordon Kljestan
9	FW	SLE	Teteh Bangura
10	MF	GHA	Joshua Boateng
11	FW	HAI	Ricardo Pierre-Louis
12	DF	USA	Troy Roberts
14	DF	USA	Anthony Stovall

No.	Pos.	Nation	Player
15	MF	SEN	Alioune Gueye
16	MF	SLE	Warren Kanu
17	MF	TTO	Ryan Stewart
19	DF	HAI	Stéphane Guillaume
20	DF	TTO	Stephen Cruickshank
21	MF	USA	Steve Gillespie
22	DF	CAN	Paul Ballard
23	MF	TTO	Terrence McAllister
24	FW	LBR	Leo Gibson
25	MF	CIV	Arsene Oka
27	MF	USA	Jason Hotchkin
77	MF	BOL	Pato Aguilera

== Year-by-year ==
Year	Division	League	Reg. season	Playoffs	Open Cup	Avg. attendance
2007	3	USL Second Division	2nd	Semifinals	2nd Round	1,417
2008	3	USL Second Division	3rd	Champions	3rd Round	1,634
2009	2	USL First Division	11th	Did not qualify	2nd Round	1,491

== Honors ==
- USL Second Division
  - Winners (1): 2008

== Head coaches ==
- (Scotland) Martin Rennie (2007–2008)
- (United States) Rod Underwood (2009)
- (United States) James Jaggard (U23 Head Coach) (2007–2008)

== Stadia ==
- Krenzler Field; Cleveland, Ohio (2007–2008)
- Middlefield Cheese Stadium at Bedford High School; Bedford, Ohio (2009)

== Television ==
On April 7, 2008, the City Stars announced a deal with SportsTime Ohio that saw all of the team's home games aired on the station. Each match aired tape delayed on game night with replays airing on Sundays. Play-by-play and color commentary was provided by Desmond Armstrong, 1994 World Cup TV commentator and former US national team player, and Glen Duerr, a former City Stars player. The broadcast included a half-time segment highlighting the team's weekly inner-city coaching and life-lessons program.

On April 6, 2009, the City Stars announced a new deal with SportsTime Ohio to air 12 home games. Glen Duerr returned and was joined by two new TV commentators, Mark Zimmerman and Steve Bell, former A-League (USL-1) and MLS player. Bell also did play-by-play for three matches on Fox Soccer Channel.

== See also ==
- USL First Division teams
