= Warren Kanu =

Sierra Leonean footballer

Personal information
- Full name: Warren John Kanu
- Date of birth: January 1, 1983 (age 43)
- Place of birth: Freetown, Sierra Leone
- Height: 5 ft 8 in (1.73 m)
- Position: Midfielder

Senior career*
Years	Team	Apps	(Gls)
- Mighty Blackpool
2006–2007	Bostancı Bağcıl		
2008	Küçük Kaymaklı Türk		
2009	Cleveland City Stars	29	(0)

International career
2007–	Sierra Leone	12	(0)
- * Club domestic league appearances and goals as of 22 October 2009

Warren Kanu (born January 1, 1983, in Freetown) is a Sierra Leonean football player, currently without a club.

== Career ==
=== Professional ===
Kanu began his career with the Mighty Blackpool team in his native Sierra Leone, before moving to the Birinci Lig in Northern Cyprus in 2006 to play for Bostancı, and then Küçük Kaymaklı. He was voted Midfielder of the Year in 2006-07.

Kanu joined the Cleveland City Stars of the USL First Division in 2009.

==== Arrest and deportation incident ====
On January 23, 2002, Kanu was one of three Sierra Leonean home based footballers (the others were Mohamed Kamara and Abdulai Kalouga Conteh) arrested by immigration officials in Cyprus when they flew to that country from Russia to find a professional football club. The three footballers were deported after being held by the Cyprus police for several days. They left Sierra Leone to have professional football trials with a Russian football club, through the help of former Cameroon goalkeeper and former African footballer of the year, Thomas N'kono. But Kanu and the three others failed to impress, and were headed back to Freetown when they received a called from a Cypriot national named Appolous who claimed he could find them a club. Unfortunately on their arrival in Cyprus Appolous did not meet them, and instead they were met by immigration officers in Cyprus.

=== International ===
Kanu played in all seven games for the Sierra Leone National Team during the 2010 FIFA World Cup Qualifiers. He played 90 minutes in Sierra Leone's victory over South Africa in Freetown.

== Personal ==
Kanu enjoys watching the NBA. His favorite movie is Full Metal Jacket; his favorite musician is Bob Marley . He wants to be a soccer agent when his player days are over.
