= Joshua Boateng =

Ghanaian footballer

Personal information
- Date of birth: 2 January 1987 (age 39)
- Place of birth: Accra, Ghana
- Height: 5 ft 9 in (1.75 m)
- Position: Midfielder

Team information
- Current team: AC Oulu

Youth career
- 2005: Virginia Tech Hokies
- 2006–2008: Liberty Flames

Senior career*
| Years | Team | Apps | (Gls) |
| 2009 | Cleveland City Stars | 11 | (5) |
| 2010–2011 | Universidad Guadalajara | 11 | (3) |
| 2012 | AC Oulu | 0 | (0) |

International career
- Ghana U-17
- * Club domestic league appearances and goals as of 22 October 2009

Joshua Boateng (born 2 January 1987) is a Ghanaian former footballer.

== Career ==
=== Youth and amateur ===
Boateng attended Nkwatia Presbyterian School in his native Ghana, and played club football for the Accra-based Liberty Colts, before going to the United States in 2004 to attend college. He played college soccer at Virginia Tech and Liberty University, where he was named a member of the All-Big South First Team in 2007, and honoured as the Big South Player of the Year and was named to the Missouri Athletic Club Hermann Trophy Watch List for the best player in the NCAA in 2008. He was also an All American player.

Prior to his senior year at Liberty University, Boateng trialed in Europe with French club Strasbourg and Spanish club Gimnastic, and was offered a contract but declined to sign in order to finish his collegiate career.

=== Professional ===
Boateng was chosen in the third round (33rd overall) of the 2009 MLS SuperDraft by Los Angeles Galaxy, and played four months but was not offered a contract due to problems with his international clearance from his amateur team in Ghana. Very skillful, and brilliant with the ball, he is very dangerous at the attacking line according to the former USA Men's National Team coach Bruce Arena.

Once the problems were solved, he joined the USL First Division franchise Cleveland City Stars in April, 2009 and became the leading scorer in the team and made his professional debut on April 18, 2009, in Cleveland's 2009 season-opening game against Miami FC., .

Boateng was invited by Deportivo La Coruna in the top Spanish league. After playing there for one year he signed a lucrative contract with Leones Negros in the Mexican League.

- "News: - Joshua Boateng on trial at Deportivo La Coruna | BigSoccer Forum". bigsoccer.com.

He played with Leones Negros for the Bicentenario 2010–2012 season in Mexico.

After knee surgery in Finland whilst playing for Haka FC in the Finish top flight, he was advised by doctors to stay away for a longer period.

=== International ===
Boateng has represented Ghana at U-17 and U-20 level.
