= Horace Burrell =

Jamaican businessman and sports administrator

Captain Horace Burrell
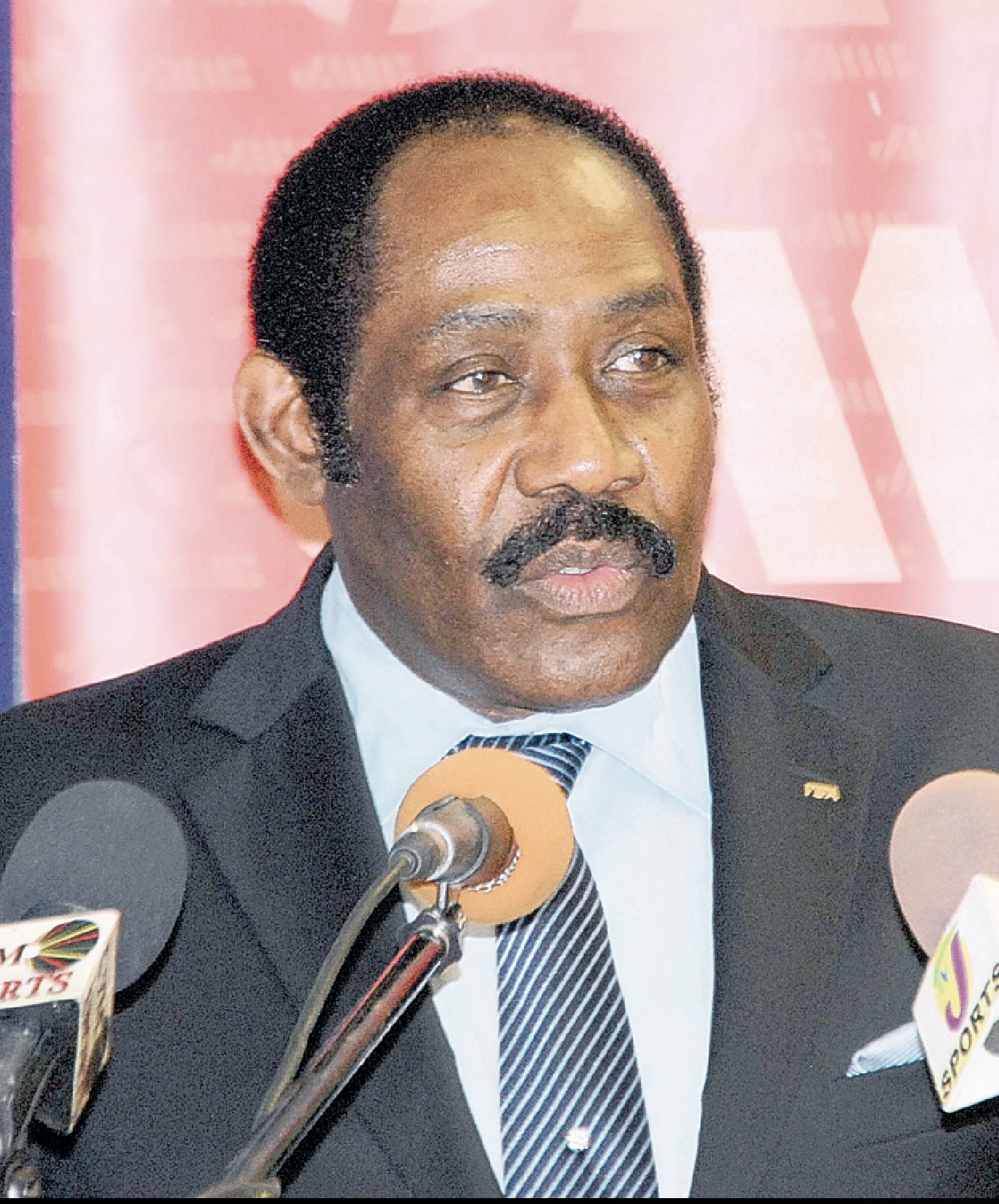
- Burrell at a press conference in 2012

President of Jamaica Football Federation
- In office 1994 – 6 June 2017
- Preceded by: Crenston Boxhill
- Succeeded by: Michael Rickets

Personal details
- Born: Horace Garfield Burrell; 8 February 1950 May Pen, Clarendon, Colony of Jamaica, British Empire
- Died: 6 June 2017 (aged 67) Baltimore, Maryland, United States
- Resting place: Up-Park Camp
- Spouse: Lourea Simpson (divorced) Vincia Julal (separated)
- Relations: Portia Simpson-Miller (cousin) Shaggy (cousin)
- Children: Tiphani Burrell-Piggott; Tahj Burrell (deceased); Romario Burrell; Jaeden Burrell
- Education: Clarendon College; St Elizabeth Technical High School
- Occupation: Businessman; entrepreneur; politician; philanthropist

Horace Garfield Burrell JP OM (8 February 1950 – 6 June 2017), also known as Captain Burrell, was the president of the Jamaica Football Federation, and the senior vice-president of CONCACAF. He was also the founder of the Jamaican restaurant chain The Captain's Bakery and Grill and Captain's Aviation, which he founded in 1995 and 2008 respectively.

== Early life ==
Burrell was born to Edward Adrian Burrell a tobacco grower in Clarendon Parish and Linda Maud Burrell. The youngest of four siblings (Edward, Carlton, and Winston being the others), Burrell showed an unusual passion to make something of himself and to make his family proud.

At about the time of Burrell's birth, his father, Edward, attempted to purchase the land that he was leasing for tobacco farming, but was denied. Consequently, Edward gave up the lease and returned to the family lands in upper Clarendon where he continued to pursue general farming, growing bananas, sugar cane, citrus, some tobacco and keeping livestock. While farming was a central focus of family life, the Burrell parents maintained a primary commitment to the education of their children as their top priority. His brother Glen, noted that during these early years the family had a close relationship. He also notes that Burrell was an absolutely devoted son, administering to his mother's every need prior to her death in 1993.

When Burrell entered Clarendon College for his high school days, he became involved in almost every extra-curricular activity available. He was a member of the school's Under-14 team for the Galloway Cup in football, played cricket and was a member of both the camera club and debating society. His true love, however, was the cadet corps. Burrell would spend hours teaching the younger cadets map-reading, rifle shooting and other disciplines. At Clarendon College, he attained the rank of drum major. He was being selected two consecutive seasons by the Jamaica Combined Cadet Force to represent Jamaica in cadet exchanges with Canada and Trinidad and Tobago. Everyone expected that Burrell would become a soldier as it "reflected his love of discipline and willingness to face tough obstacles."

After 'A' Level exams Burrell was still not totally decided on a career direction. Through friends of his brother he learned that the St. Elizabeth Technical High School, John Pottinger, was looking for someone to teach Biology and Agricultural Science, both subjects in which Burrell had excelled. Soon, Burrell was teaching at St. Elizabeth Technical High School as a teacher, often teaching boys of his own age. Burrell taught at the school for the academic year 1970-1971, where he met his future wife, Lourea Simpson, in 1976.

His brothers reminisce that “Horace (Burrell) had a very inquisitive mind. He was never prepared to take no for an answer and he questioned everything...even if it came from his mother.” In his early 20s, Burrell taught agricultural science at St. Elizabeth Technical High School. He then joined the Jamaica Defence Force, rising to the rank of Captain, which would be his moniker for years to come.

He undertook basic officer training with the Canadian Armed Forces at Chilliwack, British Columbia, and later New Brunswick. He would later be supervised by Colonel Ken Barnes, the father of English international footballer John Barnes. Burrell described Barnes as "a great military leader". It was Barnes who charged Burrell with looking after the JDF football team after Burrell shown Barnes a local newspaper headline "Boy's Town drill soldiers".

== Military career ==
At St. Elizabeth Technical High School, Burrell had been placed in charge of the school's cadet squad at the rank of second lieutenant. He applied for entry to the Jamaica Defence Force (JDF) and undertook a challenging three-day course of physical endurance, leadership appreciation, and mental ability tests. In the end, of a field of 48 candidates, he was one of only three to be green-lighted for training overseas as commissioned officers.

With this in view, Commissioned Officer Cadet Burrell undertook basic officer training with the Canadian Armed Forces at Chilliwack, British Columbia, at their officer candidate school from which he emerged after an intensive one-year course of study as a military officer graduate. As a second lieutenant, Burrell stayed in Canada, to undertake further studies at the Combat Arms School situated on the Canadian Forces Base in Gagetown, New Brunswick. One year later in 1974, and now Lieutenant, Burrell would fly to the United Kingdom to undertake further military studies at the School of Infantry, Platoon Commander's Battle Course which took place in Warminster. Following his return to Jamaica in 1975, Burrell spent the next two years as a Training Officer at the Newcastle Military post, training new cadets.

In 1977 Burrell was promoted to captain in the Jamaica Defence Force after just five years of army enrollment, three of which, had been spent in advanced weapons and leadership training. He then received his private pilot license as he sought to make progress in aviation, something Burrell had always been fascinated with aviation. Burrell would retain the rank of captain for six additional active years of army life.

In 1980-1981 Burrell returned to Canada for further studies, this time at the Canadian Land Force Command and Staff College in Fort Frontenac, Ontario. Immediately on his return to Jamaica in 1981, he was given the signal honor of being appointed acting company commander, First Battalion, Jamaica Regiment, a position he held for a year.

In 1983 Burrell retired from the army as a captain. On his retirement, he was the recipient of a 1983 Medal of Honor from the government of Jamaica for his commanding officer role in Operation Urgent Fury.

== Football ==
While in the Jamaica Defence Force (JDF), Burrell also gained another advantage that would serve him well for the rest of his adult life, a close association with the sport of soccer and a chance to exert leadership over the JDF strong football team. As manager of the team, he unknowingly was learning life lessons that would later allow him to become the fulcrum around which Jamaica's entire football program revolved. His chance came at the behest of Colonel Ken Barnes who was his supervisor and the father of English international footballer John Barnes. Barnes taught Burrell much about military leadership but also charged Burrell with looking after the JDF football team after the Captain had shown the Colonel a local newspaper headline "Boy's Town drill soldiers" which he saw as shameful to the soldiers.

Burrell saw the charge as a challenge and laid out a plan to make the team competitive. He recruited a civilian coach (Raymond Beek) and together they wrote a detailed plan of serious training. There were many who felt that Burrell's goals for the JDF team were unreachable, as the Captain had determined that the team should win the National Premier League. Within three years (during the 1984–1985 season) the feat was accomplished and was followed by his guiding the JDF team to capture the major League title in 1986-1987. In addition, three of his players - Michael Tulloch, Eric Curry, and Wayne Wonder - made the Jamaican national team.

One of Burrell's first actions was arranging for the JDF team to travel to Trinidad and Tobago to engage in practice matches. It was during these visits that the seeds were sown for his active engagement with leadership in Caribbean football. Years later, just before the Captain left the JDF, he was invited to become a member of the executive of the 30-nation Caribbean Football Union (CFU). It was good karma-bearing fruit.

While all this was happening on the business front, Burrell continued to thrive in football administration and joined the executive of the Kingston and St. Andrews Football Association (KSAFA) in 1992 as Treasurer serving in that role for two years. According to Burrell, it was the professionalism he saw at KSAFA which was the primary impetus to his offering service at the JFF. KSAFA was organized and ran smoothly under Russell Bell and Billy Marston, Burrell noted. The JFF needed that application of structure. Following a spell at the Kingston and St Andrew Football Association (KSAFA), he put forward his name to become President of the Jamaica Football Federation in 1994. He was president of the federation from 1994 to 2003 and from 2007 until his death in 2017. In addition to his presidency of JFF, he was the Senior Vice President of CONCACAF and a former Vice President of the CFU and served as a member of the FIFA Disciplinary Committee and as a Vice President of the Jamaica Olympic Association.

At the 1996 FIFA Congress in Zurich, his girlfriend, Vincy Jalal who had traveled with Burrell, posed as the representative of the Haitian Football Federation due to the of absence Dr Jean-Marie Kyss, who was prevented from leaving Haiti by the Haitian Government at the time. Kyss was angered when he found out as he felt not putting a representative in place was a symbolic gesture showing that he wouldn't be manipulated by the Haitian government.

=== 1998 World Cup campaign ===
On the field, Captain wanted the strongest team. He said the Reggae Boyz were the only earner among national teams and used it as the thrust for the nation's football. For the 1998 Road to France campaign, he went to Brazil for René Simões, a coach also remembered for the famous inscription on his shirt, ‘Jesus Saves’. Burrell then found creative ways of bringing back the country's best footballers who were on contract overseas at the time, such as Walter Boyd, Wolde Harris, Paul Young, Altimont Butler, Anthony ‘Bingy’ McCreath, Fabian Davis, and Paul Isaacs to play for the national team. Later, Peter Cargill and one of the 1993 Gold Cup heroes, Paul ‘Tegat’ Davis, joined the team after returning from professional stints in Israel. The plan, importantly, needed money and matches for practice and success. This came with international games at the National Stadium, mainly, and they fostered a spirit of endearment towards the Boyz. With all combined, the team gained momentum to even win football's Best Mover of the Year Award, in 1996, on its journey to the ultimate stage, the World Cup Finals. Under The Captain's leadership, Jamaica also qualified for three FIFA Youth World Cup tournaments: Under-17, New Zealand 1999; Under-20, Argentina 2001; and Under-17, Mexico 2011. After being elected to office in 1994, Burrell was instrumental in leading the Reggae Boyz to the 1998 World Cup in France, making Jamaica the first English-speaking Caribbean country to qualify for the FIFA World Cup.

He received Jamaica's fourth highest national honor, the Commander of the Order of Distinction (CD) in 1998. He also received the highest award, Order of Merit, from the world football governing body, FIFA, in 2000 for his outstanding leadership skills in piloting the Jamaica Football team to the World Cup. A number of countries were said to have adopted the Jamaican model of development in their quest for World Cup Final qualification due to their success.

=== FIFA ban ===
On 14 October 2011, the FIFA Ethics Committee, banned Horace Burrell for a period of six months because he was involved in the Caribbean Football Union corruption scandal. The Ethics Committee suspended three months of the ban, subject to a probationary period of two years.

== Personal life ==
Burrell had four children, one of whom, Tahj, predeceased him.

Burrell was the founder of the restaurant chain The Captain's Bakery and Grill, in 1995, as well as Captain's Aviation Services in 2008.

== Death ==
Burrell died on June 6, 2017. Burrell had been battling cancer since 2016. Prior to his death, Burrell was undergoing treatment at the Johns Hopkins Cancer Treatment Center in Baltimore, Maryland. He is survived by his children: Dr. Tiphani Burrell-Piggott, Romario Burrell and Jaeden Burrell. The Prime Minister of Jamaica, Andrew Holness, said the nation must pause and reflect on the life and great works of Captain Burrell while extending sincere condolences to his family and friends, the football fraternity and the entire Captain's Bakery family.
