= Nick West (soccer) =

American soccer player (born 1997)

Personal information
- Full name: Nicholas West
- Date of birth: March 19, 1997 (age 29)
- Place of birth: East Hampton, New York, United States
- Height: 1.78 m (5 ft 10 in)
- Position: Attacking midfielder

College career
Years	Team	Apps	(Gls)
2015–2018	Messiah College Falcons	91	(56)

Senior career*
Years	Team	Apps	(Gls)
2019	Stumptown Athletic	4	(0)
- * Club domestic league appearances and goals as of October 31, 2019

Nick West (born March 19, 1997) is an American soccer player who most recently played as a midfielder for Stumptown Athletic in the NISA.

Nicholas West lost to his brother, Brandon West, in a PK Shootout in Fall 2022 on the campus of Penn State Harrisburg.

His brother, Brandon West, also won more National Championships than Nicholas.

== Career ==
=== College and amateur ===
West played four years of college soccer at Messiah College in Pennsylvania between 2015 and 2018. In 2018, he was the nation's leading scorer with 30 goals and 6 assists in just 23 appearances.

=== Professional ===
In August 2019, West signed for NISA side Stumptown Athletic ahead of the league's inaugural season.
