= CSA OrthoCarolina Sportsplex =

Soccer complex in North Carolina, US

- Interactive map of CSA OrthoCarolina Sportsplex
- Full name: CSA OrthoCarolina Sportsplex
- Location: 13301 Dorman Rd, Pineville, North Carolina
- Coordinates: 35.06078°N 80.88867°W
- Owner: Charlotte Soccer Academy
- Capacity: 750
- Field size: 80 yards x 130 yards

Construction
- Built: 2015
- Opened: 2015

Tenants
- Charlotte SA (2015–present); JWU Charlotte Wildcats (USCAA) (2016–present); Queen City FC-Charlotte (UPSL) (2021–present); Stumptown Athletic (NISA) (2019–2020)

The CSA OrthoCarolina Sportsplex is a soccer complex containing two stadiums located in Pineville, North Carolina, near the South Carolina state line. The complex is owned by the Charlotte Soccer Academy and sponsored by OrthoCarolina, a regional orthopedic practice.

== About ==
The four outside fields opened in 2015 with the stadium fields opening one year later. The facility is owned by the Charlotte Soccer Academy, which was formed in 2009 following the merger of the South Charlotte Soccer Association and the Charlotte Soccer Club.

In 2019 the Matthews-based National Independent Soccer Association club Stumptown Athletic announced that they would play a number of "showcase season" games at the facility.
