= Drew Yates =

American soccer player (born 1988)

Personal information
- Full name: Drew Yates
- Date of birth: May 14, 1988 (age 38)
- Place of birth: Severna Park, Maryland, United States
- Height: 6 ft 1 in (1.85 m)
- Positions: Midfielder; forward

Youth career
- 2001–2006: Casa Mia's Bays
- 2004: IMG Soccer Academy

College career
Years	Team	Apps	(Gls)
2006–2009	Maryland Terrapins	92	(14)

Senior career*
Years	Team	Apps	(Gls)
2010	FC Tampa Bay	14	(0)
2011–2012	Harrisburg City Islanders	21	(1)
2013–2014	Charlotte Eagles	49	(6)
2015	Austin Aztex	21	(2)
2019–2020	Stumptown Athletic	4	(1)

International career^{‡}
2004	United States U17	2	(0)

Managerial career
- 2014: Davidson Wildcats (assistant)
- 2021: Stumptown AC (assistant)
- * Club domestic league appearances and goals as of March 18, 2020 ‡ National team caps and goals as of February 16, 2013

Drew Yates (born May 14, 1988, in Severna Park, Maryland) is an American soccer player.

== Career ==
=== College and amateur ===
Yates attended Archbishop Curley High School and DeMatha High School, played club soccer for the two-time national champion Casa Mia's Bays, and later attended the U.S. Soccer Residency Program in Bradenton, Florida. He was named the Washington Post Player of the Year and the Maryland Gatorade Player of the Year in 2006 and was a three-time NSCAA All-American.

He played four years of college soccer at the University of Maryland, and helped them to the NCAA Division I title in 2008. He ended his career at Maryland scoring 14 goals and having 13 assists, totaling 47 points for the squad, and received numerous honors, including ACC All-Academic, Second Team All-Atlantic South Region and Second Team All-ACC selections.

=== Professional ===
Yates was drafted in the second round (29th overall) of the 2010 MLS SuperDraft by Chicago Fire but was not offered a contract by the team. After a brief trial with Major League Soccer's D.C. United, Yates turned professional in 2010 when he signed for FC Tampa Bay in the USSF Division 2 Professional League. He made his professional debut on April 24, 2010, a game against the NSC Minnesota Stars.

He had a trial with Czech team SK Sigma Olomouc in January 2011.

Yates signed with USL Pro club Harrisburg City Islanders on April 13, 2011. Yates worked at Grace Christian School Bowie after his professional career ended.
