= Michael Binns =

Jamaican footballer (born 1988)

Personal information
- Full name: Michael George Binns
- Date of birth: 12 August 1988 (age 38)
- Place of birth: Clarendon, Jamaica
- Height: 1.70 m (5 ft 7 in)
- Position: Midfielder

Senior career*
Years	Team	Apps	(Gls)
2015–2016	Portmore United	20	(6)
2015	→ York Region Shooters (loan)	5	(2)
2016	Wilmington Hammerheads	9	(1)
2017	Portmore United	18	(7)
2018	Tulsa Roughnecks	10	(0)
2018–2019	Humble Lions	27	(3)
2019	Stumptown Athletic	4	(2)
Total		93	(21)

International career
2016–2017	Jamaica	17	(0)
Medal record
Men's football
Representing Jamaica
CONCACAF Gold Cup
Runner-up	2017 United States	Team
- * Club domestic league appearances and goals

Michael George Binns (born 12 August 1988) is a Jamaican former professional footballer who played as a midfielder. At international level, he made 17 appearances for the Jamaica national team.

== Club career ==
Binns played for Portmore United in Jamaica. He went abroad on loan deal to play with York Region Shooters in the Canadian Soccer League. In July 2016, Binns signed with the Wilmington Hammerheads in USL. In 2017, Binns returned to Portmore United. In 2018, Binns signed for USL side Tulsa Roughnecks.

In August 2019, Binns joined National Independent Soccer Association club Stumptown Athletic.

== International career ==
Binns was part of the Jamaica national team's 23-man squad for the at the 2016 Copa América. He made his international debut for Jamaica at the 2016 Copa América against Venezuela on 5 June 2016, coming on as an 86th-minute substitute for Giles Barnes.

== Career statistics ==
Scores and results list Jamaica's goal tally first.

No	Date	Venue	Opponent	Score	Result	Competition
1.	25 August 2017	Hasely Crawford Stadium, Port of Spain, Trinidad and Tobago	Trinidad and Tobago	2–1	2–1	Friendly
