= Rod Underwood =

American former soccer player (born 1968)

Personal information
- Place of birth: New Orleans, Louisiana, U.S.
- Position: Midfielder

College career
Years	Team	Apps	(Gls)
1985–1989	Furman Paladins		

Senior career*
Years	Team	Apps	(Gls)
1992–1996	New Mexico Chiles		
1997–1998	Albuquerque Geckos	11	(1)
1999	South Carolina Shamrocks		

Managerial career
- 1994: New Mexico Chiles (player-coach)
- 1997–1998: Albuquerque Geckos (player-coach)
- 1999: South Carolina Shamrocks (player-coach)
- 2007–2008: Portland Timbers (assistant coach)
- 2009: Cleveland City Stars
- 2010: North East Stars
- 2012: Mount Aureol
- 2017–2018: Montego Bay United F.C.
- 2021: Stumptown AC
- 2022–2024: Chattanooga FC
- * Club domestic league appearances and goals

Rod Underwood is an American former soccer player and coach.

== Playing career ==
Underwood began playing soccer at the college level with Furman University in 1985. He became the first African American to play soccer at Furman University. While at Furman he was the leading goal scorer, a three-time all-conference selection, and the conference tournament MVP as a senior. In his final year at Furman Underwood earned his bachelor's degree in 1989. As a player Underwood spent time with New Mexico Chiles, Albuquerque Geckos, and New Orleans Gamblers. Underwood dedicated his high school career to the Southwest Dekalb Panthers. Although a leading goal scorer, he and his team consistently came up short, or slow, to the Stone Mountain Pirates.

== Management career ==
Underwood first began his coaching career as player-coach at New Mexico Chiles in 1994. Once he moved to Albuquerque in 1997, he led the Geckos to the USISL D-3 Pro League Championship before coaching the club through its promotion to the A-League a season later. The following season Underwood was appointed the head coach for the South Carolina Shamrocks in 1999. Following his stint with South Carolina, he was appointed the assistant coach for Georgia State University. On April 19, 2007, Portland Timbers head coach Gavin Wilkinson appointed Underwood as his assistant coach. During the 2007 USL season, he helped the Timbers finish second place in the standings and helped the club reach the semifinals in the playoffs before losing to Atlanta Silverbacks. On February 5, 2009, the Cleveland City Stars announced the hiring of Underwood to serve as the new head coach for the 2009 USL season. He became the second head coach in club history, after succeeding Martin Rennie. In preparation for the 2009 season, Underwood resolved to bring new players to the squad, notably players from Africa and MLS experienced players. Underwood was named head coach for North East Stars in the TT Pro League on April 16, 2010. In 2010, he joined the coaching team for the MLS side the Portland Timbers as an assistant coach for the U-16 academy team.

In 2012, he went abroad to manage Mount Aureol in the Sierra Leone National First Division. He later returned to the United States and joined the management staff of Sacramento Republic FC in the United Soccer League in the capacity of an assistant coach. In 2017, he was named the head coach for Montego Bay United F.C. in the National Premier League. In 2019, he was appointed the director of club relations for iSoccerPath.

On March 3, 2021, Underwood was announced as the new head coach of National Independent Soccer Association side Stumptown AC ahead of the team's return from hiatus. On December 3, 2021, Underwood was named head coach of Chattanooga FC. After three seasons with Chattanooga, he parted ways with the club in 2024.
