= Jared Odenbeck =

American soccer player (born 1995)

Personal information
- Full name: Jared Odenbeck
- Date of birth: February 4, 1995 (age 31)
- Place of birth: Milwaukee, Wisconsin, U.S.
- Height: 1.88 m (6 ft 2 in)
- Position: Midfielder

Youth career
- Charlotte Soccer Academy

College career
Years	Team	Apps	(Gls)
2013	Georgetown Hoyas	12	(0)
2014–2016	Wake Forest Demon Deacons	47	(4)

Senior career*
Years	Team	Apps	(Gls)
2014	Southern California Seahorses	11	(0)
2015–2016	Charlotte Eagles	17	(0)
2017	Charlotte Independence	0	(0)
2017	Lindome GIF	12	(0)
2018	South Georgia Tormenta	2	(0)
2019	Western Suburbs		
2019–2021	Stumptown AC	21	(0)
2021	→ FC Tucson (loan)	7	(0)
2022–2023	Ljungskile SK	51	(1)
- * Club domestic league appearances and goals as of 23rd November 2023

Jared Odenbeck (born February 4, 1995) is an American soccer player who is currently a free agent.

== Career ==
=== College and amateur ===
Odenbeck began playing college soccer at Georgetown University in 2013, where he stayed for one season, before transferring to Wake Forest University.

While at college, Odenbeck appeared in the USL PDL for Southern California Seahorses in 2014, and Charlotte Eagles in 2015 and 2016.

=== Professional ===
On March 8, 2017, Odenbeck joined United Soccer League side Charlotte Independence. After leaving Charlotte, Odenbeck moved to Sweden to play the latter half of the year with Lindome GIF.

Odenbeck temporarily returned to the United States in 2018, playing with South Georgia Tormenta.

2019 saw Odenbeck play in New Zealand with Western Suburbs.

In September 2019, Odenbeck signed for NISA side Stumptown Athletic ahead of the league's inaugural season. Odenbeck signed on loan with FC Tucson on February 24, 2021.
