= Will Prado =

American soccer player

Personal information
- Full name: William Prado
- Date of birth: January 19, 1988 (age 38)
- Place of birth: Santa Ana, California, United States
- Height: 1.71 m (5 ft 7 in)
- Position: Midfielder

Youth career
- 2009–2010: LBCC Vikings
- 2011–2012: Concordia Eagles

Senior career*
Years	Team	Apps	(Gls)
2013	Charlotte Eagles	20	(0)
2014	Orange County Blues FC	19	(0)
- * Club domestic league appearances and goals as of May 5, 2014

William Prado (born January 19, 1988) is an American professional soccer player.

== Career ==
=== College and amateur ===
Prado played two years of college soccer at Long Beach City College in 2009 and 2010, before moving to Concordia University for 2011 and 2012. Prado, a 2011 and 2012 NAIA All-American, finished his Concordia career with a school record 30 assists to go along with 20 goals. In 2011 Prado set the school single season record with 18 assists which was also tops in the NAIA that year. Prado finished his Concordia career 6th all-time in points with 70. He was also a 2011 and 2012 All-GSAC First Team selection and 2012 NAIA All-Tournament team.

=== Professional career ===
Prado signed with USL Pro club Charlotte Eagles on March 5, 2013. He made his pro debut on April 13, 2013, in a 2–0 victory over Antigua Barracuda FC.[3]

After one season with Charlotte, he joined Orange County Blues FC, near his hometown, for the 2014 season.
