= Yves Jean-Bart =

Haitian football executive (born 1947)

Yves Jean-Bart, nicknamed Dadou, (born 30 October 1947 in Aquin), was the President of the Haitian Football Federation until 20 October 2020, when he was banned for life following a sexual harassment investigation by The Guardian.

He was re-elected to the position for fifth time in January 2016.

In the wake of the suspension of Jack Warner and Lisle Austin in 2011, he became the acting president of the Caribbean Football Union.

== Abuse allegations ==
On 30 April 2020, Jean-Bart was accused of sexually abusing young female footballers, including one who was forced to have an abortion. On 20 November 2020, the FIFA Ethics Committee banned him from football activities for life.
