= Barry Watson =

Barry Watson may refer to:

- Barry Watson (actor) (born 1974), American actor
- Barry Watson (athlete) (born 1944), British long-distance athlete
- Barry Watson (producer), American television producer
