= Santa Cruz, Jamaica =

Coordinates: 18°03′N 77°42′W

Santa Cruz 27th
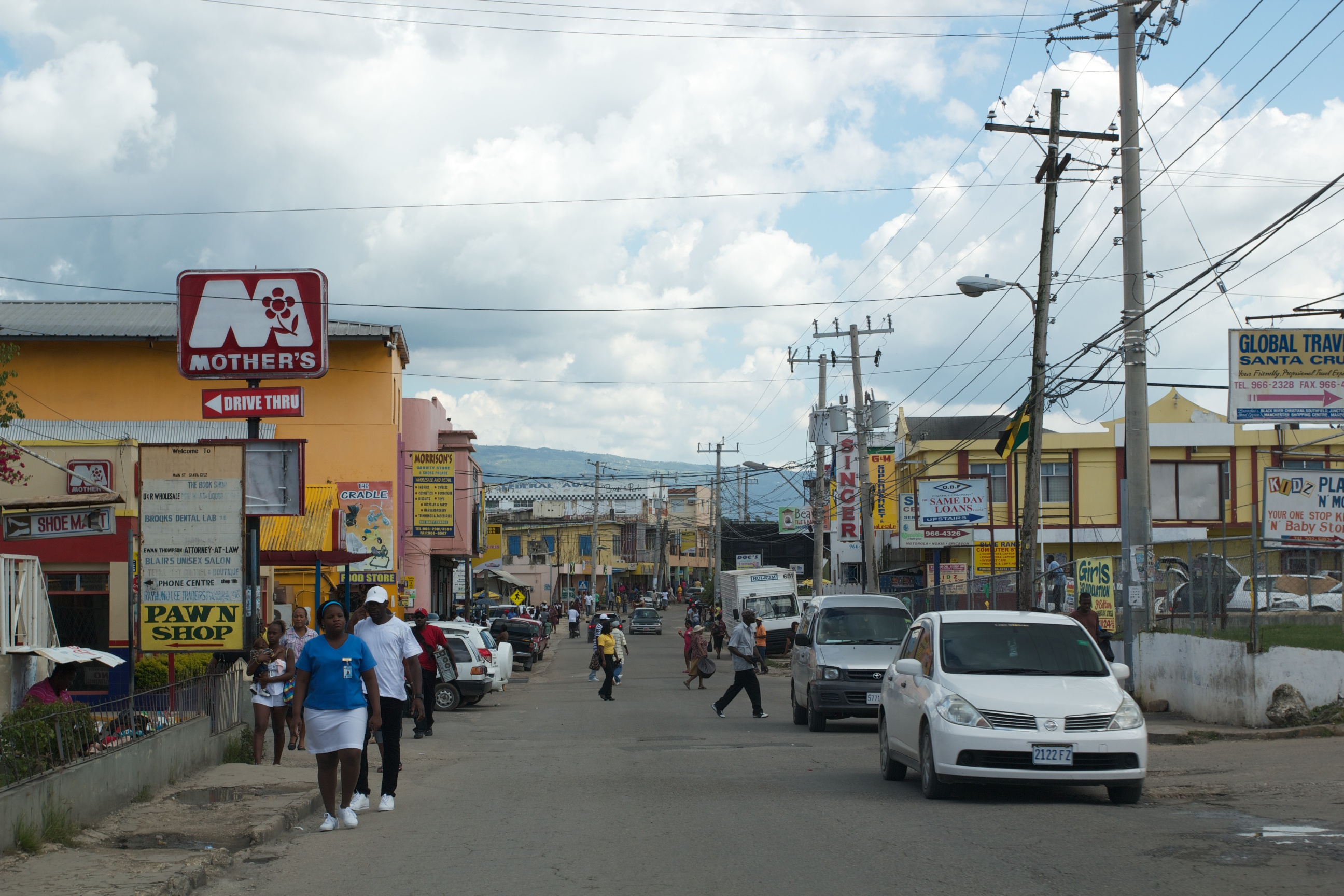
- Downtown Santa Cruz in October 2012.
- Interactive map of Santa Cruz 27th

Santa Cruz is a town in Saint Elizabeth, Jamaica. It is on the A2 road connecting Black River to Mandeville. A minor market village until the 1950s, the development of nearby areas for bauxite mining stimulated its growth in the 1950s and 1960s, as did the establishment of the St. Elizabeth Technical High School in 1961.

Santa Cruz has its own courthouse, police station, a variety of restaurants, supermarkets, and funeral parlors.

In October 2025, Santa Cruz was heavily damaged by Hurricane Melissa.
