= Donald Benamna =

Central African Republic footballer

Personal information
- Full name: Donald Ulrich Benamna
- Date of birth: 14 September 1996 (age 30)
- Place of birth: Bangui, Central African Republic
- Height: 1.72 m (5 ft 8 in)
- Position: Forward

Youth career
- ASA Milan BlackHawks
- –2014: Montgomery Blair Blazers

College career
Years	Team	Apps	(Gls)
2014	San Diego State Aztecs	0	(0)
2015	San Jacinto South Coyotes	13	(15)
2017	Central Arkansas Bears	15	(1)

Senior career*
Years	Team	Apps	(Gls)
2016	Ocean City Nor'easters		
2018–2019	Little Rock Rangers	16	(10)
2019–2020	Stumptown Athletic	4	(2)
2022	Charlotte Eagles	7	(7)
2022	Maryland Bobcats	1	(0)
2023	Northern Colorado Hailstorm	9	(0)
2024	Amal Tiznit		
2025	Texoma FC	5	(0)

International career^{‡}
2020–	Central African Republic	5	(0)
- * Club domestic league appearances and goals as of 1 November 2025 ‡ National team caps and goals as of 11 July 2025

Donald Benamna (born 14 September 1996) is a Central African Republic footballer who plays as a forward.

== Personal life ==
Born in Bangui, Central African Republic. He moved to the United States when he was twelve years old.

== College and amateur career ==
Benamna began playing college soccer at San Diego State University in 2014, before making transfers to San Jacinto College in 2015, and later to the University of Central Arkansas in 2017. Benamna spent part of 2016 with USL PDL side Ocean City Nor'easters.

Benamna spent both 2018 and 2019 playing with NPSL side Little Rock Rangers.

== Club career ==
In September 2019, Benamna signed for NISA side Stumptown Athletic ahead of the league's inaugural season.

In 2022, Benamna had spells with USL League Two side Charlotte Eagles and NISA side Maryland Bobcats FC.

On 23 February 2023, Benamna signed with USL League One side Northern Colorado Hailstorm after a successful trial.

Following a short spell in the Moroccan third tier with US Amal Tiznit, Benamna returned to the United States in 2025, joining USL League One side Texoma FC ahead of their inaugural season.

== International career ==
In October 2019, Benamna was called up for the first time for the Central African Republic for a friendly match against Niger. His debut came 2020, in a 2021 Africa Cup of Nations qualification Group E match versus Morocco.

He continued to be named in the Central Africa Republic squad for their 2026 FIFA World Cup qualifiers.
