= Jalen Brown =

American soccer player (born 1995)

Personal information
- Date of birth: January 23, 1995 (age 31)
- Place of birth: Indianapolis, Indiana, U.S.
- Height: 5 ft 10 in (1.78 m)
- Position: Forward

College career
Years	Team	Apps	(Gls)
2013–2016	Xavier Musketeers	80	(14)

Senior career*
Years	Team	Apps	(Gls)
2015	Cincinnati Dutch Lions	2	(0)
2016	Des Moines Menace	1	(0)
2017	Rochester Rhinos	19	(1)
2018	New York Cosmos B	10	(1)
2019–2020	Stumptown Athletic	6	(1)
2021	Kings Hammer		
- * Club domestic league appearances and goals as of April 3, 2024

Jalen Brown (born January 23, 1995) is an American former soccer player who played as a forward.

== Career ==
Brown played fours years of college soccer at Xavier University between 2013 and 2016, where he made a total of 80 appearances and scored 14 goals.

Brown also played with USL PDL sides Cincinnati Dutch Lions and Des Moines Menace.

On January 13, 2017, Brown was selected in the second round (38th overall) of the 2017 MLS SuperDraft by New York City FC. However, he wasn't signed by the club.

Brown signed with United Soccer League club Rochester Rhinos on March 7, 2017.

Brown signed with National Premier Soccer League club New York Cosmos B on May 30, 2018.

In September 2019, Brown was signed by National Independent Soccer Association side Stumptown Athletic ahead of its inaugural season.

== Personal life ==
Brown's sister is professional soccer player Ryanne Brown, and Philippines international Sarina Bolden is their cousin.
