= Sportsplex at Matthews =

Sports complex in Matthews, North Carolina

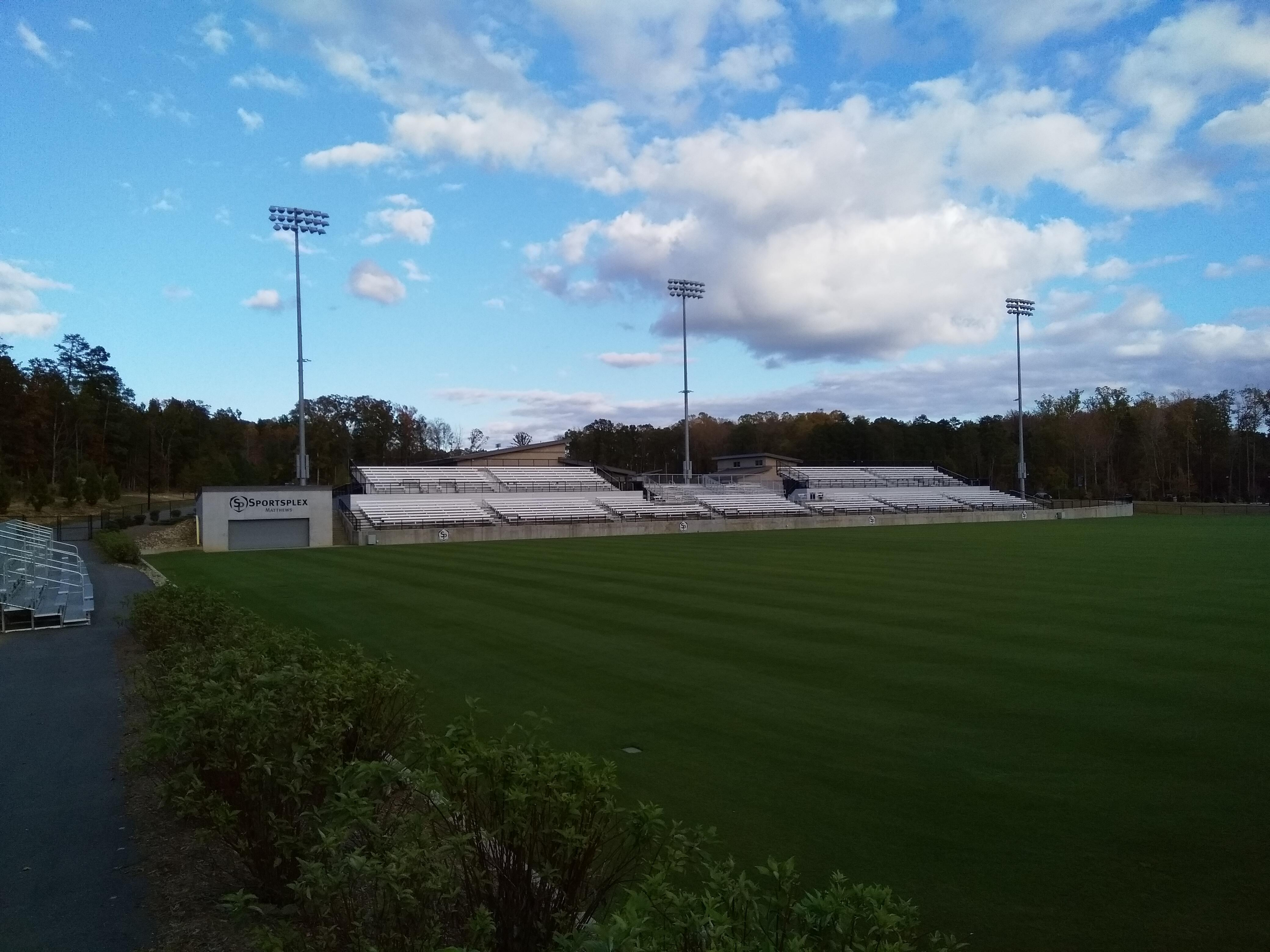
- Interactive map of Sportsplex at Matthews
- Full name: Mecklenburg County Sportsplex at Matthews
- Address: 2425 Sports Parkway; Matthews, NC 28105
- Coordinates: 35°06′43.8″N 80°42′0.7″W
- Owner: Mecklenburg County
- Seating type: Benches
- Capacity: 5,000 (stadium); ~750 (Field 10)

Construction
- Groundbreaking: 2012 (park); 2015 (stadium)
- Opened: 2015 (park); 2017 (stadium)
- Expanded: 2018
- Cost: $32 million
- Architect: Woolpert
- General contractor: J.D. Goodrum

Tenants
- Charlotte Independence (USLC) (2017–2021); Charlotte Eagles (USL2) (2017–present); Charlotte Lady Eagles (WPSL) (2019–present); Stumptown Athletic (NISA) (2019–2021); Crown Legacy (MLSNP) (2023–present)

Website
- Sportsplex at Matthews

The Sportsplex at Matthews is a large sports complex and park in Matthews, North Carolina, southeast of Charlotte, featuring 12 full-sized soccer fields anchored by a 2,300-seat stadium. The stadium currently seats 5,000 as it has been expanded using modular seating.

In 2018 bleacher seating was placed around Field 10 creating a smaller auxiliary stadium used by the Charlotte Independence as a training field and occasionally by the Charlotte Eagles and Lady Eagles for matches.

== History ==
The idea of a sports complex along the outer-belt in Matthews was first proposed in the early 21st century with the official groundbreaking taking place on May 17, 2012 following years of delays due to the Great Recession. Originally called the Matthews Sportsplex the name was changed during construction. Following a soft opening in 2015, the complex was completed in early 2017.

In August 2019 the stadium hosted the Charlotte Football Kickoff, a high school football double-header that had previously been played at American Legion Memorial Stadium in Charlotte.

The Sportsplex was one of the hosts for the 2020 NCAA Division I Men's Soccer Tournament and the 2020 NCAA Division I Women's Soccer Tournament.

The Sportsplex will host the 2025 Men's & Women's NCAA Division II soccer championships with Wingate University acting as the host school.

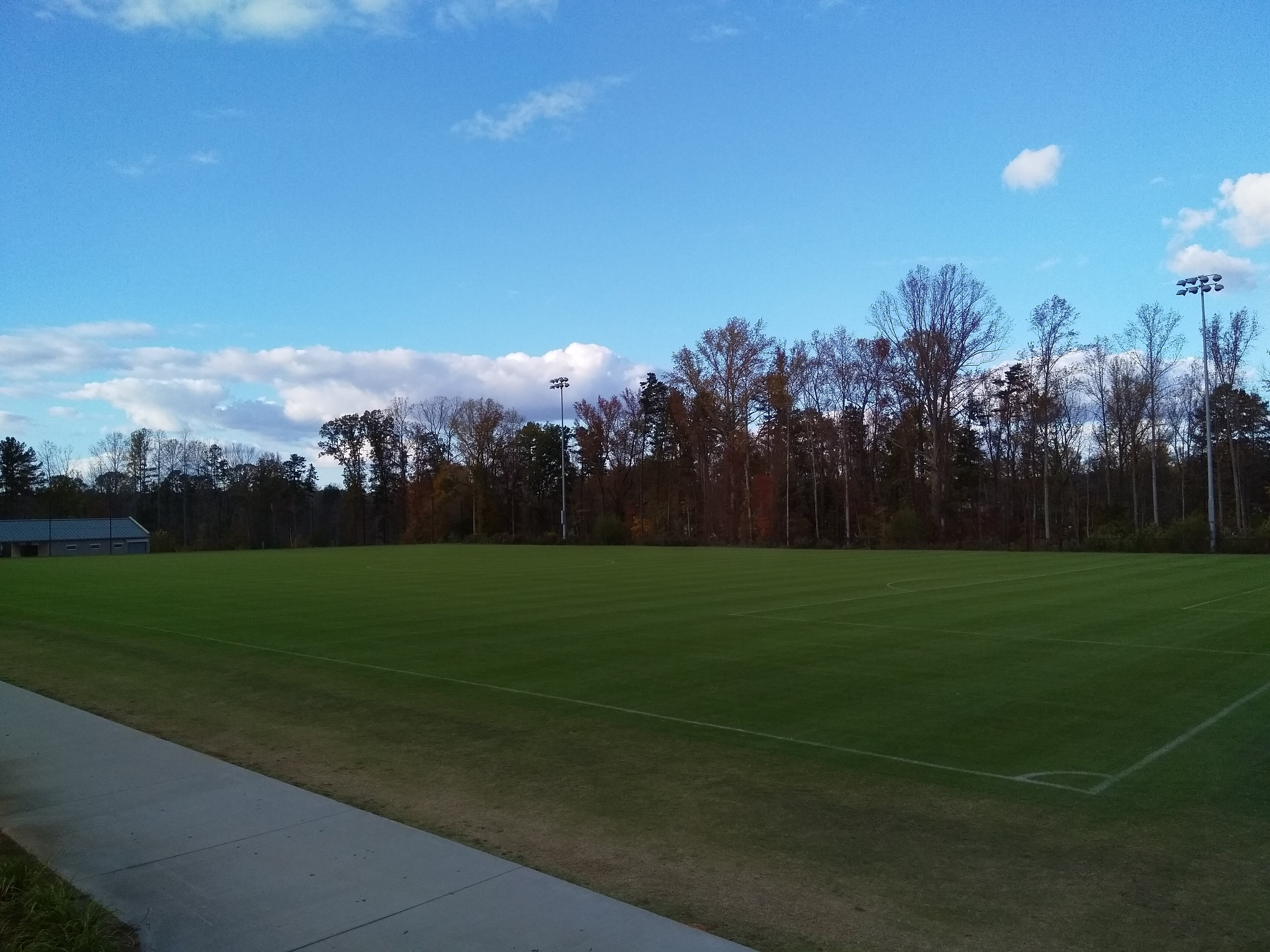
"Field 10"
