= Mark Steffens =

American soccer coach (born 1953)

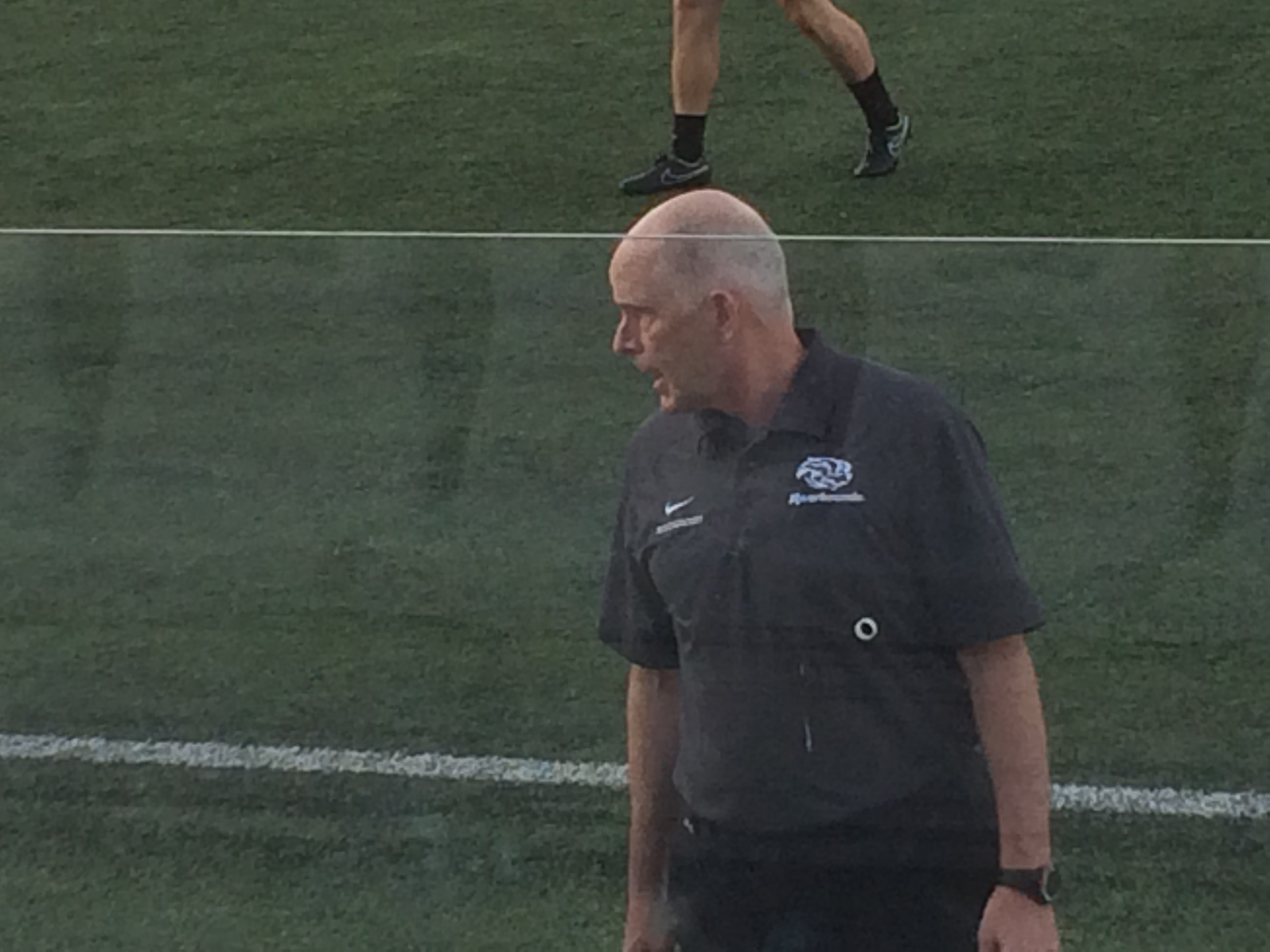
- Steffens in 2015

Personal information
- Full name: Mark Luther Steffens
- Date of birth: June 9, 1953 (age 73)
- Place of birth: Huntington, New York, United States

College career
Years	Team	Apps	(Gls)
1971–1974	King's College Lions		

Senior career*
Years	Team	Apps	(Gls)
1975–1976	New York Apollo		

Managerial career
- 1975–1979: Berner High School
- 1980–1983: The King's College
- 1983–1984: Farmingdale State College (assistant)
- 1983–1984: New York Arrows (assistant)
- 1985–1986: New York Express (assistant)
- 1986–1987: New York Express
- 1988–1994: Syosset High School (assistant)
- 1990–1996: Commack Connection
- 1995–1996: Chaminade High School
- 1997–2014: Charlotte Eagles
- 2014–2016: Pittsburgh Riverhounds
- 2019: Charlotte Lady Eagles (assistant)
- 2019–2020: Stumptown Athletic
- 2021–: Charlotte Lady Eagles (assistant)
- * Club domestic league appearances and goals

Mark Luther Steffens (born June 9, 1953) is an American soccer coach.

== Playing career ==
A native of Huntington, New York and also raised in Syosset, New York, Steffens attended The King's College in New York City, where he graduated with a degree in Physical Education. He started for the soccer team in each of his four years at the college.

Upon graduating from college, Steffens signed his first and only professional contract with American Soccer League side New York Apollo. Soon after this experience, he immediately began his coaching career.

== Coaching career ==
Steffens began his coaching career at the high school level, where he held the position of head coach at Berner High School from 1975 to 1979. He later took over the head coach position at his alma mater, The King's College for the next three years and then subsequently joining Farmingdale State College as an assistant for a year.

After experiences at both the secondary and post-secondary levels, Steffens was hired as an assistant coach under Shep Messing for the New York Arrows of the Major Indoor Soccer League. The franchise struggled in the New York market and fell into bankruptcy. Steffens was hired again as an assistant in another New York incarnation in the MISL with the New York Express. A year later, he was promoted to the role of head coach.

Steffens returned to youth coaching as he accepted an assistant coach position at Syosset High School, where he remained in this capacity until 1994. While holding this role, he served as coaching director for the Long Island Junior Soccer League (LIJSL) and head coach for one of the league's clubs, the Commack Connection, from 1990 to 1996. After these posts, he served as head coach at Chaminade High School for two years.

After spending his entire life and career in New York, Steffens moved to Charlotte in 1997, where he accepted the head coaching role with the Charlotte Eagles. He served in this role from 1997 to 2014. Under his direction, the club won two USL-2 Championships. He was awarded the USL-2 Coach of the Year award twice in 2004 and 2008 respectively. In 2007, he was named into the USL Hall of Fame. He left as head coach when the Eagles decided to self-relegate to the USL PDL after the 2014 season.

Steffens was hired as head coach of the Pittsburgh Riverhounds on December 17, 2014.

On July 21, 2019, it was announced that Steffens would take charge at Stumptown Athletic, a National Independent Soccer Association team based out of Matthews, North Carolina.

In January 2021, Steffens returned to the Lady Eagles as an assistant coach.

== Personal life ==
Steffens is the son of Rev. Paul Steffens, director of the Christian Fellowship House in Syosset and also pastor of Syosset Gospel Church, along with his other son. Steffens is also a non-denominational ordained minister himself.

Steffens and his wife Diane have three daughters, Jennifer, Christy and Sarah, and nine grandchildren. He currently resides in Waxhaw, North Carolina.

== Honors ==
=== Club ===
Charlotte Eagles

- USL-2 Championship (2): 2000, 2005

=== Individual ===
- USL-2 Coach of the Year (2): 2004, 2008
- USL Hall of Fame inductee
