= Jamaica Football Federation =

Governing body of association football in Jamaica

CONCACAF
- Short name: JFF
- Founded: 1910; 116 years ago
- Headquarters: Kingston, Jamaica
- FIFA affiliation: 1962
- CONCACAF affiliation: 1963
- President: Michael Ricketts (football administrator)
- Website: jff.football

The Jamaica Football Federation (JFF) is the governing body of association football in Jamaica and is in charge of the Jamaica national football team and the Jamaican football league system, including the Jamaica Premier League.

== History ==
=== Early history (1893–1962) ===
According to the JFF, the Football Association was formed in 1910 and controlled all games in Jamaica. In 1925, Jamaica's national team had its first international match against Haiti and won all three games 1–0, 2–1, and 3–0. In 1926, Jamaica hosted Haiti at Sabina Park and won 6–0. The Haitians remained frequent opponents, and it was not until 1932 that their run of defeats was broken with a 4–1 home win in Port-au-Prince.

From 1925 to 1962, Jamaica had regular games with teams from Trinidad and Tobago, Haiti, and Cuba, as well as with clubs like the Haitian Racing CH and Violette AC, the British Corinthians, and the Argentinean Tigers. Many of the games were played at Sabina Park and many clubs were established, including Melbourne, Kingston, Kensington, Lucas and St George's Old Boys. In 1952, the Caribbean All-Star team was formed with players from Trinidad, Cuba, Haiti, and Suriname. The team played four matches against Jamaica in Sabina Park. Jamaica won the second game 2–1 and the fourth 1–0, and the All-Stars won the first game 5–1 and the third 1–0. Noted Jamaican players included Lindy Delapenha and Gillie Heron.

=== Post-independence (1962 onward) ===
In 1965, under the leadership of Brazilian coach Jorge Penna, Jamaica made its first attempt at World Cup qualifying. This was for the 1966 World Cup finals in England. The preliminary group included Cuba, the Netherlands Antilles, and Jamaica. Jamaica's first game was against Cuba which they won 2–0 at Jamaica's National Stadium. In the qualifying match against the Netherlands Antilles, Jamaica also had a 2–0 victory with both goals coming. In the away games Jamaica was held to a goalless draw with the Netherlands Antilles and suffered a 2–1 defeat to Cuba. Jamaica then advanced to the final group of three, which included Costa Rica and Mexico. The winner of this group would represent the CONCACAF region. Jamaica lost at home to Mexico 3–2 and in the return leg in Mexico City the high altitude proved too much for Jamaica and they were defeated 8–0. Jamaica lost 7–0 to Costa Rica in their inaugural encounter and had a 1–1 tie when they played at home.

In 1968, George Hamilton was the new coach when Jamaica attempted to qualify for the 1970 FIFA World Cup in Mexico. Jamaica had only a few remaining players from its previous World Cup team and had to rebuild because most of its players had retired or migrated abroad. Jamaica lost all of its qualifying games in that year.

Jamaica's participation in the 1974 World Cup elimination saw the suspension of 17 players on the team because of poor behaviour on a tour to Bermuda. Jamaica withdrew from the elimination in order to restructure their team.

The 1978 World Cup in Argentina saw Jamaica playing Cuba and losing 3–1 at the National Stadium and then 2–0 in Havana, Cuba. Jamaica did not qualify.

In 1982 Jamaica did not make an attempt for the World Cup Final set in Spain due to insufficient funds and a poorly prepared team. Jamaica did not participate in the 1986 World Cup because of suspension for affiliation fees that were due to FIFA.

In preparation for the 1990 World Cup with coach Jeffery Maxwell, Jamaica won both preliminary games against Puerto Rico 1–0 in Jamaica and 2–0 at Puerto Rico. The US were the next opponents and was held to a goalless draw. The return leg in the US saw Jamaica losing 5–1, bringing an end to their qualifying attempt.

The United States hosted the World Cup 1994. In qualifying, Jamaica beat Puerto Rico 2–1 and was then faced with Bermuda, Canada, and El Salvador from which two teams would advance to the final round. Jamaica tied 1–1 with Canada and Bermuda and then lost 2–0 to El Salvador, 1–0 to Canada, 2–1 to El Salvador. Jamaica then beat Bermuda 3–2 but did not qualify.

Under Brazilian Professor Renê Simões and National coach Carl Brown, Jamaica became a powerhouse in the Caribbean region and received the "Best Mover" award by FIFA in 1996.

Jamaica was the debut English-speaking Caribbean region country to qualify for the World Cup finals in 1998.

== Presidents ==
1. Ronald Gordon (1965–1967)
2. George Abrahams CBE. (1967–1973)
3. B. "Tino" Barvier (1973–1975)
4. Locksley Comrie (1975–1977)
5. Patrick Anderson (1977–1979)
6. Lincoln Sutherland (1979–1981)
7. Hugh Perry (1981–1983)
8. Dr. Winston Dawes (1983–1985)
9. Anthony James (1985–1992)
10. Heron Dale (1992–1994)
11. Captain Horace Burrell (1994–2003)
12. Creston Boxhill (2003–2007)
13. Captain Horace Burrell (2007–2017)
14. Michael Ricketts (September 2017–)

=== Association staff ===
Name	Position	Source
(Jamaica) Michael Ricketts	President	
(Jamaica) Barry Watson	Vice President	
(Jamaica) Elaine Walker-Brown	2nd Vice President	
(Jamaica) Raymond Grant	3rd Vice President	
(Jamaica) Gregory Daley	General Secretary	
(Jamaica) Peter Reid	Treasurer	
(Jamaica) Wendell Downswell	Technical Director	
(Jamaica) Rudolph Speid	Team Coach (Men's)	
(Jamaica) Hubert Busby	Team Coach (Women's)	
(Jamaica) Simon Preston	Media/Communications Manager	
(Jamaica) Wayne Shaw	Futsal Coordinator	
(Jamaica) Cardella Samuels	Referee Coordinator	
