= Stumptown AC =

American professional soccer team

- Founded: 2018
- Dissolved: 2021; 5 years ago
- Stadium: Sportsplex at Matthews
- Capacity: 5,000
- League: NISA
- Fall 2021: 8th Place
- Website: stumptownac.com
Home colors

Stumptown AC, formerly Stumptown Athletic, was an American professional soccer team that played in the National Independent Soccer Association (NISA). The club was based in Matthews, North Carolina, a suburb of Charlotte.

== History ==
=== Founding ===
Following an initial bid in late 2017, the team was first announced by the National Independent Soccer Association on October 23, 2018 with plans to begin play in the inaugural 2019–20 season. Originally referred to in league press releases simply as "Charlotte", the name "Stumptown Athletic" was officially unveiled in June 2019. The name came from an early nickname for Matthews derived from the fact that farmers cut down so many trees to clear land that the town was left full of tree stumps.

The team was originally owned by Christopher Clarke of Atlanta, a lawyer specializing in wealth management, and Casey Carr, a former college soccer player with the DePaul Blue Demons and an entrepreneur based out of Mecklenburg County. Carr also served as the club's president and GM in its first season.

On July 21, 2019 the club appointed Mark Steffens as head coach. Steffens previously coached the Charlotte Eagles and served as an assistant for the Charlotte Lady Eagles. In August, Stumptown announced former Jamaica national football team player Michael Binns and Jared Odenbeck as their first signings.

During the Fall 2019 showcase, Stumptown competed within the East Coast Conference and finished second in their group. In the championship game the team fell to Miami FC, 3–0. After two matches in the Spring 2020 season, NISA announced a suspension of play due to the COVID-19 pandemic. Eventually, the entire Spring Season was cancelled outright.

=== NISA takeover and folding ===
Following a hiatus during the Fall 2020 season, Clarke tried to sell the club. Unable to find a new buyer, the league itself took over ownership and operations of the team under a new logo and the revised name Stumptown AC on March 3, 2021. Soccer executive Fred Matthes and former Portland Timbers assistant coach Rod Underwood were announced as the new team president and head coach, respectively.

The Spring 2021 season was a difficult one for Stumptown. With league ownership requiring a shoestring budget, bills went unpaid during the season. The broadcast company went unpaid and nearly refused to air the team's final game. Player paychecks were frequently late, and on at least one occasion players were paid by the opposing team before a game.

The league searched for a new owner throughout the 2021 season, and put the team on hiatus after the season ended. Underwood left the club and on December 3, 2021 was named head coach of regional rival Chattanooga FC. Following the league's failure to secure new ownership, the hiatus became permanent and Stumptown AC folded.

== Supporters ==
The club's supporters' group was the QC Royals. Founded in 2015 to support other minor league soccer clubs, the Royals moved on to support Charlotte FC after Stumptown folded.

== Stadium ==
The team used both CSA OrthoCarolina Sportsplex in Pineville and the Sportsplex at Matthews as home venues in 2019-20, and played all of its home games in the Sportsplex at Matthews during the Spring 2021 season.

== Year-by-year ==
Season	League	Div.	Pos.	Pl.	W	D	L	GS	GA	Pts.	Playoffs	U.S. Open Cup	Top goalscorer		Manager
Season	League	Div.	Pos.	Pl.	W	D	L	GS	GA	Pts.	Playoffs	U.S. Open Cup	Name	League	Manager
2019–20	NISA	Fall – East Coast (Note: The Fall 2019 NISA season had eight teams split into two separate conferences, East Coast and West Coast)	2nd	6	4	0	2	13	7	12	Runner-up	Cancelled	(Jamaica) Michael Binns (Central African Republic) Donald Benamna (United States) Jalen Brown	2	(United States) Mark Steffens
2019–20	NISA	Spring (Note: Spring season cancelled before completion)	1st	2	0	2	0	3	3	2	Cancelled	Cancelled	(Jamaica) Michael Binns (Central African Republic) Donald Benamna (United States) Jalen Brown	2	(United States) Mark Steffens
2020–21	NISA	Fall	On hiatus									Cancelled	(United States) Alex McGrath	3	(Nigeria) Rod Underwood
2020–21	NISA	Spring	3rd	8	4	3	1	8	4	15	Did not qualify	Cancelled	(United States) Alex McGrath	3	(Nigeria) Rod Underwood
