= 2019–20 Atlanta SC season =

Club's inaugural season in the National Independent Soccer Association

Atlanta SC
2019–20 NISA season
- President: Phoday Dolleh
- Head coach: Roberto Neves
- Stadium: St. Francis High School (2 games); Alpharetta, GA; Lupo Family Stadium (1 game); Marietta, Georgia, GA
- NISA: Fall, East Coast Conf.: 3rd Spring: N/A
- Playoffs: Fall: DNQ; Spring: N/A
- Top goalscorer: League: Nazeem Bartman (3); All: Nazeem Bartman (3)
- Highest home attendance: 252 (October 12 vs. Miami FC)
- Lowest home attendance: 112 (September 14 vs. Stumptown Athletic)
- Average home league attendance: 182
- Biggest win: N/A
- Biggest defeat: 1–3 (September 14 vs. Stumptown Athletic)

The 2019–20 Atlanta SC season was the club's first season playing professionally and its first in the National Independent Soccer Association (NISA), a newly established third division soccer league in the United States.

== Overview ==
On November 20, 2018, the National Independent Soccer Association announced that a team from Atlanta would begin play in its inaugural season in fall 2019. In late 2019, following the end of the National Premier Soccer League season Atlanta SC announced it would be joining NISA.

On January 8, the full list of teams taking part in the 2020 U.S. Open Cup was announced including eight from the National Independent Soccer Association. Since Atlanta SC was not listed among these teams, and all professional clubs within the United States are required to take part in the tournament, this signaled that the club will not take part in professional play in the Spring 2020 season.

== Roster ==
=== Players ===
As of December 27, 2019

No.	Position	Nation	Player
1	GK	SCO	Jordan Bell
3	DF	ESP	Manu Moreno
4	DF	TOG	Ramzi Toure
5	DF	SLE	Sheriff Suma
6	DF	LBR	Ricardo George
7	FW	RSA	Nazeem Bartman
8	MF	FRA	Alexandre Frank
9	FW	CMR	William Eyang
10	FW	LBR	Prince Saydee
11	FW	LBR	Molley Karpeh, Jr.
12	FW	GHA	Derrick Boateng
13	DF	ANG	Onezimo Francisco
14	MF	GHA	Jeffrey Otoo
15	DF	USA	Austin Rainey
18	GK	USA	Bryce Billington
20	FW	LBR	Garmina Paygar
21	DF	GAM	Lamin Gerewou
22	DF	USA	Adil Gowani
23	FW	USA	Francis Eto
26	DF	ENG	Fuad Adeniyi
42	DF	CMR	David Koloko
55	MF	NGA	Rilwan Salawu
73	GK	ESP	Walid Birrou
88	MF	BRA	Carlyle Junior

=== Staff ===
- (Brazil) Roberto Neves – Head coach
- (Brazil) João Garcia – Assistant coach
- (Brazil) Christiane Lessa – Assistant coach
- (Sierra Leone) Abdul Bangura – Assistant coach

== Competitions ==
=== NISA Fall season (Showcase) ===
==== Standings ====
Pos	Team	Pld	W	D	L	GF	GA	GD	Pts	Qualification
1	Miami FC (O)	6	4	2	0	19	6	+13	14	East Coast Championship
2	Stumptown Athletic	6	4	0	2	13	7	+6	12	East Coast Championship
3	Atlanta SC	6	2	2	2	13	10	+3	8	
4	Philadelphia Fury	6	0	0	6	1	23	−22	0	Withdrew (Note: Philadelphia Fury withdrew after one match and forfeited their remaining matches)

Source: NISAofficial.com
(O) Play-off winners

==== Results summary ====
Overall								Home						Away					
Pld	W	D	L	GF	GA	GD	Pts	W	D	L	GF	GA	GD	W	D	L	GF	GA	GD
6	2	2	2	13	10	+3	8	1	1	1	6	5	+1	1	1	1	7	5	+2

Last updated: 25 October 2019.
Source: Match reports

==== Matches ====
September 14, 2019 1	Atlanta SC	1–3	Stumptown Athletic	Marietta, Georgia
7:00 p.m.	Saydee (yellow card) 69'; Bartman 87'	MyCujoo Broadcast	Brown 12'; Yates (yellow card) 15', (goal) 41'; Benamna 48', (yellow card) 64'; Binns (yellow card) 66'; Bejarano (yellow card) 68'	Stadium: Lupo Family Stadium at Life University; Attendance: 112

September 21, 2019 2	Philadelphia Fury	0–3 (Forfeit)	Atlanta SC	Philadelphia, Pennsylvania
7:00 p.m				Stadium: Franklin Field

September 28, 2019 3	Atlanta SC	3–0 (Forfeit)	Philadelphia Fury	Alpharetta, Georgia
7:00 p.m.				Stadium: St. Francis School

October 6, 2019 4	Miami FC	2–2	Atlanta SC	Miami Shores, Florida
7:00 p.m.	Thiaw 18', 60'; Chin (yellow card) 38'; Heath (yellow card) 82'	Report; MyCujoo Broadcast	Moreno (yellow card) 10'; Bartman 53'; Gerewou (yellow card) 84'; Frank 90+2', (yellow card) 90+6'	Stadium: Buccaneer Field at Barry University; Attendance: 289

October 12, 2019 5	Atlanta SC	2–2	Miami FC	Alpharetta, Georgia
7:00 p.m.	Karpeh, Jr. 11'; Otoo (yellow card) 52'; Saydee 69'	Report	Mares 13' (pen.), (yellow card) 74'; Thiaw 58'	Stadium: St. Francis School; Attendance: 252

October 25, 2019 6	Stumptown Athletic	3–2	Atlanta SC	Matthews, North Carolina
7:00 p.m.	Binns 24' (pen.), 82'; Israel (yellow card) 52'; West (yellow card) 90+4'; Silva 90+5'	MyCujoo Broadcast	Koloko (yellow card) 45+2'; Toure (yellow card) 48'; Garcia (Ast. Coach) (yellow card) 53'; Otoo 66'; Bartman 71'; Bell (yellow card) 78'	Stadium: Sportsplex at Matthews; Attendance: 433

== Squad statistics ==
As of Match played 25 October 2019

=== Appearances and goals ===
No.	Pos	Nat	Player	Total		Fall Season	
No.	Pos	Nat	Player	Apps	Goals	Apps	Goals
Goalkeepers
1	GK	(Scotland) SCO	Jordan Bell	4	0	4	0
18	GK	(United States) USA	Bryce Billington	0	0	0	0
73	GK	(Spain) ESP	Walid Birrou	0	0	0	0
Defenders
3	DF	(Spain) ESP	Manu Moreno	3	0	3	0
4	DF	(Togo) TOG	Ramzi Toure	3	0	3	0
5	DF	(Sierra Leone) SLE	Sheriff Suma	1	0	1	0
6	DF	(Liberia) LBR	Ricardo George	4	0	4	0
13	DF	(Angola) ANG	Onezimo Francisco	2	0	2	0
15	DF	(United States) USA	Austin Rainey	1	0	1	0
21	DF	(The Gambia) GAM	Lamin Gerewou	3	0	3	0
22	DF	(United States) USA	Adil Gowani	1	0	1	0
26	DF	(England) ENG	Fuad Adeniyi	1	0	1	0
42	DF	(Cameroon) CMR	David Koloko	4	0	4	0
Midfielders
8	MF	(France) FRA	Alexandre Frank	4	1	4	1
14	MF	(Ghana) GHA	Jeffrey Otoo	4	1	4	1
55	MF	(Nigeria) NGA	Rilwan Salawu	0	0	0	0
88	MF	(Brazil) BRA	Carlyle Junior	4	0	4	0
Forwards
7	FW	(South Africa) RSA	Nazeem Bartman	4	3	4	3
9	FW	(Cameroon) CMR	William Eyang	4	0	4	0
10	FW	(Liberia) LBR	Prince Saydee	4	1	4	1
11	FW	(Liberia) LBR	Molley Karpeh, Jr.	4	1	4	1
12	FW	(Ghana) GHA	Derrick Boateng	0	0	0	0
20	FW	(Liberia) LBR	Garmina Paygar	0	0	0	0
23	FW	(United States) USA	Francis Eto	3	1	3	1

=== Goal scorers ===
Place	Position	Nation	Number	Name	Total
1	FW	(South Africa)	7	Nazeem Bartman	3
2	MF	(France)	8	Alexandre Frank	1
2	FW	(Liberia)	10	Prince Saydee	1
2	FW	(Liberia)	11	Molley Karpeh, Jr.	1
2	MF	(Ghana)	14	Jeffrey Otoo	1

=== Disciplinary record ===
Number	Nation	Position	Name	Total	
Number	Nation	Position	Name	Booked	Sent off (straight red)
1	(Scotland)	GK	Jordan Bell	1	0
3	(Spain)	DF	Manu Moreno	1	0
4	(Togo)	DF	Ramzi Toure	1	0
8	(France)	MF	Alexandre Frank	1	0
10	(Liberia)	FW	Prince Saydee	1	0
14	(Ghana)	MF	Jeffrey Otoo	1	0
21	(The Gambia)	DF	Lamin Geerwou	1	0
42	(Cameroon)	DF	David Koloko	1	0
	(Brazil)	X	João Garcia (Ast. Coach)	1	0
