= Ginga Scout =

Location-based soccer application

- Developer: Softmovel
- Release: November 1, 2015
- Operating system: iOS, Android
- Website: gingascout.com

Ginga Scout is a location-based soccer application owned by Linck Group that facilitates communication between mutually interested users allowing them to chat. Soccer players, Coaches and Scouts. The software was launched November 1, 2015.”.

== History ==
=== Founding ===
Ginga Scout was founded by soccer legend Roberto Carlos, Roberto Linck and Fabio Simplicio. Roberto Linck has stated that the impetus for the app was the observation he had that, "There is a place for every player".

On February 19, Lorenzo Orellano, player for Uniautónoma F.C. announced in public television that he used Ginga Scout to transfer to United States.

== Operation ==
Using Facebook, Ginga Scout is able to build a user profile with information that have already been uploaded. Basic information is gathered and the users' social graph is analyzed.

=== Features ===
- Player Cards is an ephemeral photo feature with the users photo and basic information.
- Favorites integration enables users to share their favorite players and build their favorite groups.
- Common Connections Once the coach likes a player a chat window will open and allow communication between the player and the coach.

=== Users ===
Ginga Scout is used widely throughout the world and is available in about 150 languages. Ginga Scout is for users of 13 years of age and older.

== Ginga Scout Cup ==
On January 29, Ginga Scout created the first Cup. It was held in Puerto Colombia in front of 6,000 people. The game was between Junior 93 led by Carlos Valderrama and Miami Dade FC led by Emerson Ferreira da Rosa. Other players such as Fabio Simplicio, Gabriel Rodrigues dos Santos, Roberto Linck, Orlando Ballesteros, José Amaya, Emerson Acuña, Jorge Bolaños, William Fiorillo, Víctor Pacheco also play the game. The game finished 3x2 for Junior 93.

== See also ==
- Linck Group
- Roberto Carlos
- Roberto Linck
- Fabio Simplicio
- Carlos Valderrama
- Emerson Ferreira da Rosa
