= Lingg =

Lingg, like its variants Link and Linck, is a German language nickname surname for a left-handed person (from German: link "left", cf. English: leftie, southpaw). It may refer to:

- Christoph Lingg (born 1964), Austrian photographer
- Hermann Lingg (1820–1905), German poet
- Louis Lingg (1864–1887), German-born American anarchist
- Louise Lingg (1871–after 1946), German actress, opera singer and screenwriter
- Maximilian von Lingg (1842–1930), Roman Catholic bishop of Augsburg
- Walter Lingg (1925–2000), Austrian politician

== See also ==
- Lingg Brewer (born 1944), American politician and educator
- Johann Baptiste Lingg, a 1920 German silent historical film
