= Linck =

Linck may refer to:

- Linck Group, an American investment group
- Linck Nunataks, in the Whitmore Mountains, Antarctica

== People with the surname ==
- Johann Heinrich Linck, the elder (1674–1734), German pharmacist and naturalist
- Catharina Margaretha Linck (1694–1721), German transgender man
- Johann Heinrich Linck, the younger (1734–1807), German pharmacist and naturalist, son of the above
- Wenceslaus Linck (1736–post 1790), Bohemian missionary and explorer in Baja California
- Gottlob Linck (1858–1947), German mineralogist
- Ernst Linck (1874–1935), Swiss painter
- Schiøler Linck (1878-1952), Danish actor
- Kurt Linck (1889–?), German religious writer
- Louis Linck (1895–1962), French sculptor
- Roberto Linck Brazilian/American professional soccer player and owner of Linck Group
