= Mário Braga =

Brazilian footballer and coach

Mario Braga
Personal information
- Full name: Mario Andre Fernandes Braga
- Date of birth: January 10, 1973 (age 53)
- Place of birth: Rio de Janeiro, Brazil
- Height: 5 ft 10 in (1.78 m)
- Position: Goalkeeper

Team information
- Current team: Miami Dade FC (Goalkeeper Coach)

Youth career
- Years: Team
- 1986–1993: Flamengo

Managerial career
- 1995–1997: Grajaú (Goalkeeper Coach)
- 1996–1999: Flamengo (Goalkeeper Coach)
- 1999–2000: Al-Khor Sports Club (Goalkeeper Coach)
- 2000: Fluminense (Goalkeeper Coach)
- 2000–2002: CFZ (Goalkeeper Coach)
- 2007: Estacia de Sa (Goalkeeper Coach)
- 2014–: Miami Dade FC (Goalkeeper Coach)

Mario Andre Fernandes Braga (born January 10, 1973, in Rio de Janeiro, Brazil) is a former soccer player, and goalkeeper coach of the Miami Dade FC in the NAL.

== Player ==
Braga played in his youth for Flamengo where he played from 1986 to 1993.

== Coach ==
Braga began his coaching career as a goalkeeper coach for Grajaú in 1995, before moving to Brazil giants Flamengo.

Braga also had a spell with Qatar football club Al-Taawun now known as Al-Khor Sports Club in 1999.

In May 2014, he was named head coach of Miami Dade FC in the NAL.

== Honours ==
=== Club ===
Flamengo

- Brazilian U17 National (Champions) (1): 1998
- U20 Eurovoetball Tournament (Champions) (1): 1998
- Campeonato Carioca U17 (Champions) (1): 1997
- Campeonato Carioca U20 (Champions) (1): 1997
- Taca Guanabara U20 Champions (1): 1997
- Taca Londrina (Runner-up) (1): 1998

Fluminense

- Brazilian U17 national (Runner-up) (1): 2000

Al-Khor Sports Club

- Sheikh Jassem Cup (Runner-up) (1): 1999

CFZ

- Campeonato Carioca U17 Serie B (Champions) (1): 2000
- Campeonato Ades U17 (Champions) (1): 2000
- Campeonato Carioca U20 Serie B (Champions) (1): 2001

Miami Dade FC

- NAL (Champion) (1): 2014
