= Linck Group =

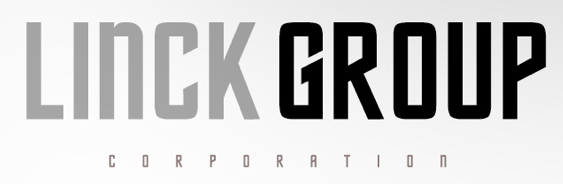
- Company type: Private
- Industry: Sports Investment
- Founded: Miami, United States (2013)
- Headquarters: Miami, United States
- Key people: Roberto Linck
- Subsidiaries: Miami Dade FC; Ginga Scout; Softmovel; Linckia; APSL; Aurora; Conttratta; Sayan Capital

Linck Group Corporation is an American investment group that manages and invests in assets across multiple sectors, including films and sports. Linck Group runs American soccer club Miami Dade FC.

== Properties ==
=== Miami Dade FC ===
Miami Dade FC is a club and company created by Linck Group, to find and prepare promising football newcomers to pursue careers in other clubs, including abroad. On November 3, 2015 former Brazil capitain Emerson Ferreira da Rosa announced that he was joining Miami Dade FC.

=== Ginga Scout ===
Ginga Scout Is a software that promotes players from all over the world, primarily to help them achieve their dreams of playing at the college or professional level. Former Brazil national football team player Roberto Carlos is one of the founders and owner of the software. The software was launched in November, 2015.

=== Conttratta & Conttratta Studios ===
Conttratta was established by Linck Group in 2014 as a management firm and Conttratta Studios as a film production. Conttratta represents artists and sports figures such as Claudia Alende, Naldo Benny, Laura Rizzotto, Edgaras Jankauskas, Craig Tornberg, Fabio Simplicio, Roberto Carlos, Ricardo Alves Fernandes and Emerson Ferreira da Rosa .

=== American Premier Soccer League ===
In 2015, Linck Group co-founded the American Premier Soccer League. The League was sanctioned by the USASA, and as such its teams were eligiblebto enter local qualifiers for the U.S. Open Cup where the winner gains entry into the CONCACAF Champions League whose winner qualifies for the FIFA Club World Cup. However no team from the league ever made it past the second round of the Open Cup. In 2019 the league folded.

=== Moeller Design ===
Founded in 1988, Moeller Design is a company involved in the production of footwear. With more than 5,000 square meters built and about 260 employees, the company produces 3,000 pairs of shoes daily. Located in an industrial area called "Vale dos Sinos", by the Rio dos Sinos (River of the Bells). The town's economy relies heavily on the shoe industry. Other industries are present, but mostly linked to the shoe manufacturing process. Moeller Design is currently under the leadership of Jonathan Moeller and Linck Group.
