= Rafael Porto =

Brazilian footballer and technical coordinator

Personal information
- Full name: Rafael da Silva Porto
- Date of birth: February 8, 1979 (age 47)
- Place of birth: Porto Alegre, Brazil
- Height: 5 ft 11 in (1.80 m)
- Position: Defender

Team information
- Current team: Miami Dade FC (Technical Coordinator)

Youth career
- 1991–1993: Sport Club Internacional
- 1993–1998: Gremio

Senior career*
Years	Team	Apps	(Gls)
2000	Brasil de Pelotas		
2000	Riograndense Futebol Clube	4	

Managerial career
- 2001: Gremio (scout)
- 2001–2005: Ulbra (assistant coach)
- 2006: Santa Cruz (assistant coach)
- 2006: Brusque Futebol Clube (assistant coach)
- 2007: Sport Club Ulbra Ji-Paraná (assistant coach)
- 2008: Esporte Clube Cruzeiro (U-17 Head Coach)
- 2009: Esporte Clube Cruzeiro (Club Supervisor)
- 2011–2013: Fluminense (scout)
- 2014–: Miami Dade FC (Technical Coordinator)
- * Club domestic league appearances and goals

Rafael da Silva Porto (born February 8, 1979, in Porto Alegre, Brazil) is a former professional soccer player, and current technical coordinator of the Miami Dade FC in the NAL.

== Player ==
Porto played in his youth career for Sport Club Internacional from 1991 to 1993 and for Sport Club Internacional from Gremio where he played from 1993 to 1998.

He made his professional debut for Brasil de Pelotas in the Campeonato Gaucho in 2000.

== Coach ==
Porto began his football career outside the field as a scout for Gremio in 2001.

He also had a spell with Ulbra, Brusque Futebol Clube and Santa Cruz as an (Assistant coach) before joining football giants Fluminense as a scout 2011 where he stayed for 2 years.

In May 2014, he was announced by Miami Dade FC in the NAL as a technical coordinator.
