= Thiago Fernandes =

Thiago Fernandes may refer to:

- Thiago Augusto (Thiago Augusto Fernandes, born 1990), footballer
- Thiago Fernandes (footballer, born 1992)
- Thiago Fernandes (footballer, born 2001)

== See also ==
- Tiago Fernandes (disambiguation)
- Thiago Fernández (born 2004), Argentinian footballer
