= Rafael Ferreiro =

American soccer player and coach

Personal information
- Date of birth: October 22, 1979 (age 47)
- Place of birth: Plantation, Florida, USA
- Height: 5 ft 11 in (1.80 m)
- Position: Midfielder

Team information
- Current team: Miami Dade FC (Head Coach)

Youth career
- 1998–1999: Florida International University
- 1999–2001: Nova University

Senior career*
Years	Team	Apps	(Gls)
2002–2004	Racing Ferrol	34	(5)
–2002	SD Negreira	21	(6)
2004–2005	Club Sportivo Cerrito	5	(2)

International career^{‡}
1995	United States U15	3	(4)
1997	United States U17 (Pool)	0	(0)

Managerial career
- 2010–2013: Barry University (assistant)
- 2015–: Miami Dade FC
- * Club domestic league appearances and goals as of October 22, 2015 ‡ National team caps and goals as of October 25, 2012

Rafael Ferreiro (born October 22, 1979) is the current head coach of the Miami Dade FC.

== Player ==
Ferreiro played at the youth ranks of United States Men's National Soccer Team. Ferreiro was a three-time NAIA All-American while playing at Nova Southeastern University.

== Coach ==
Ferreiro began his coaching career as the head coach at Cardinal Gibbons High School in 2006 where he was inducted in the Hall of Fame Coach in 2014. He also worked as the assistant coach at Barry University from 2010 to 2013.

In May 2015, he was named head coach of Miami Dade FC.

Ferreira made his debut with Miami Dade FC in the American Premier Soccer League in 2015.

=== Miami Dade FC ===
- American Premier Soccer League - 2016 Regular Season Champions
- American Premier Soccer League - 2017 Regular Season Champions
- American Premier Soccer League - 2017 APSL Champions
