= Fábio Simplício =

Brazilian footballer (born 1979)

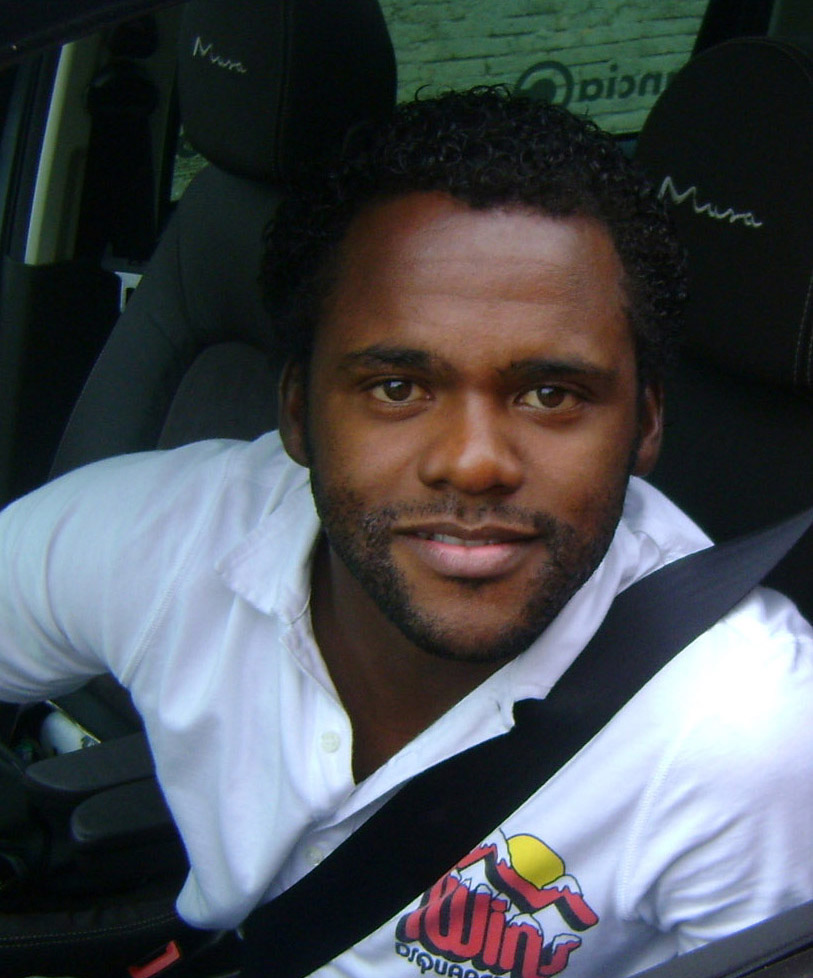
- Simplício in 2009

Personal information
- Full name: Fábio Henrique Simplício
- Date of birth: 23 September 1979 (age 47)
- Place of birth: São Paulo, Brazil
- Height: 1.73 m (5 ft 8 in)
- Position: Midfielder

Youth career
- São Paulo

Senior career*
Years	Team	Apps	(Gls)
2000–2004	São Paulo	116	(15)
2004–2006	Parma	71	(14)
2006–2010	Palermo	129	(21)
2010–2012	Roma	43	(8)
2012–2013	Cerezo Osaka	46	(7)
2014	Vissel Kobe	22	(3)
2016–2017	Batatais	6	(0)
Total		427	(68)

International career
2009	Brazil	1	(0)
- * Club domestic league appearances and goals

Fábio Henrique Simplício (born 23 September 1979) is a Brazilian former professional footballer who played as a midfielder. He appeared in 243 Serie A games for three clubs and scored 43 goals, having played for nearly a decade in the country.

== Club career ==
=== São Paulo and move to Italy ===
Born in São Paulo, Simplício started his career with hometown's São Paulo FC, going on to remain five years with the club and winning two State Leagues. In 2004, he moved to Italy and signed for Parma FC, after having been discovered by its director of football Arrigo Sacchi.

Simplício made his Serie A debut on 22 September 2004 in a 1–2 home loss against Bologna FC 1909, one day shy of his 25th birthday (16 minutes played), and finished his first season with four goals in 34 games, bettering that total to ten in the following campaign.

=== Palermo ===
On 14 June 2006 Simplício joined fellow top division side U.S. Città di Palermo, moving alongside Parma teammate Mark Bresciano. He was priced at €7.1 million, with €4.6 million being to his previous team.

During his four-year spell with the Sicilian club, Simplício appeared in more than 26 league matches, adding eight UEFA Cup appearances in two separate seasons combined (two goals). In January 2010, his agent Gilmar Rinaldi announced he would not extend his contract with Palermo, set to expire in June.

=== Roma ===
On 1 June 2010, Simplício moved to AS Roma on a three-year contract worth €1.8m per season, effective as of 1 July. He scored four league goals from 24 appearances in his debut campaign, adding the 2–1 winner against S.S. Lazio for the Coppa Italia as the capital side reached the semifinals.

In 2011–12, Simplício netted the same number of goals, including one in a Derby del Sole against SSC Napoli in a 3–1 away triumph, but Roma could only finish seventh, thus not qualifying for any European competition.

=== Cerezo Osaka ===
On 27 July 2012, Simplício joined J1 League's Cerezo Osaka. He made his official debut on 4 August against Consadole Sapporo, contributing to the 4–0 victory.

== International career ==
On 17 November 2009, aged 30, Simplício earned his first and only cap for Brazil, in a friendly match with Oman. He came on as a substitute for Felipe Melo in the second half of the 2–0 win.

== Business career ==
Simplício owned American soccer team Miami Dade FC and software Ginga Scout, alongside fellow former footballers such as Emerson, Roberto Linck or Roberto Carlos.

== Career statistics ==
=== Club ===
Appearances and goals by club, season and competition
Club	Season	League			National cup (Note: Includes Copa do Brasil, Coppa Italia, Emperor's Cup.)		League cup		Continental		Total	
Club	Season	Division	Apps	Goals	Apps	Goals	Apps	Goals	Apps	Goals	Apps	Goals
São Paulo	2000	Série A	25	5	1	0	0	0	0	0	26	5
São Paulo	2001	Série A	23	0	6	0	0	0	0	0	29	0
São Paulo	2002	Série A	25	1	7	0	0	0	0	0	32	1
São Paulo	2003	Série A	37	7	5	0	0	0	0	0	42	7
São Paulo	2004	Série A	11	2	0	0	0	0	11	0	22	2
São Paulo	Total		121	15	19	0	0	0	11	0	151	15
Parma	2004–05	Serie A	36	4	1	0	–		9	0	46	4
Parma	2005–06	Serie A	37	10	4	1	–		–		41	11
Parma	Total		73	14	5	1	0	0	9	0	87	15
Palermo	2006–07	Serie A	33	5	2	0	–		6	0	41	5
Palermo	2007–08	Serie A	32	5	2	0	–		2	0	36	5
Palermo	2008–09	Serie A	37	8	1	0	–		–		38	8
Palermo	2009–10	Serie A	27	3	3	1	–		–		30	4
Palermo	Total		129	21	8	1	0	0	8	0	145	22
Roma	2010–11	Serie A	24	4	4	1	–		3	0	31	5
Roma	2011–12	Serie A	19	4	1	0	–		2	0	22	4
Roma	Total		43	8	5	1	0	0	5	0	53	9
Cerezo Osaka	2012	J1 League	15	3	2	0	1	0	–		18	3
Cerezo Osaka	2013	J1 League	31	4	3	1	5	1	–		39	6
Cerezo Osaka	Total		46	7	5	1	6	1	0	0	57	9
Career total			412	65	42	4	6	1	33	0	493	70

=== International ===
Appearances and goals by national team and year
National team	Year	Apps	Goals
Brazil	2009	1	0
Total		1	0

== Honours ==
São Paulo

- Campeonato Paulista: 2000, 2002
- Torneio Rio–São Paulo: 2001

Individual

- Bola de Prata: 2002
