= 2014 NAL season =

During the 2014 season, the National Adult League, an American soccer league, saw the expansion of the South Florida market with five added teams joining the NAL–Florida. The schedule for the Florida division was announced in May with each team to play an 8-game schedule.

The five new clubs were:

Team name	Metro area	Location	Previous affiliation
(Florida) A.C. Brickell	Greater Miami	Miami, Florida	expansion
(Florida) Miami Dade FC	Greater Miami	Miami, Florida	expansion
South Florida FC	Greater Miami	Pembroke Pines, Florida	expansion
(Florida) Santos USA	Greater Miami	Miami, Florida	expansion
(Florida) Miami Nacional S.C.	Greater Miami	Miami, Florida	expansion
