= Guilherme Moretto =

Brazilian-American entrepreneur

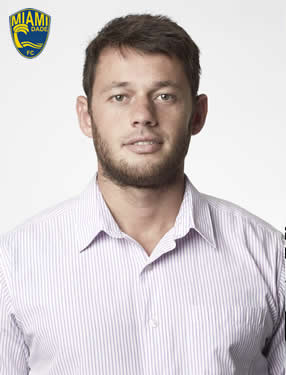
- Born: Santos, São Paulo, Brazil
- Education: Universidade Santa Cecília Bachelor of Science in Electrical Engineering Technology
- Occupation: President at Miami Dade FC
- Known for: Partnership at Miami Dade FC
- Website: www.miamidadefc.com www.gingascout.com

Guilherme Moretto is a Brazilian-American entrepreneur. He is the 1st and current President of Miami Dade FC, an American soccer team based in Miami.

== Biography ==
Born in Santos, Brazil, he has been living in the United States since 2009.

He started to play soccer in Santos when he was 4 years-old, being in the same group with Junior Moraes and Bruno Moraes, sons of Aluisio Guerreiro. Moretto played soccer collegiately for over 14 years, he played for Servico Social da Industria – SESI; UNIMED; and Instituto Luis de Camoes, winning several local tournaments. During this period he faced notable opponents such as Robinho. Moretto stopped playing soccer in 2001.

Moretto is a lifetime soccer fan and a supporter of the soccer development in the United States.

Moretto holds a bachelor's degree in Electrical Engineering and Electronic modality from the Universidade Santa Cecília in Brazil, where he was valedictorian.

== Miami Dade FC ==
On May 20, 2014, Moretto was announced as the 1st president in the history of Miami Dade FC.

Moretto is responsible for all the aspects of the club's performance and service.

== Honours ==
=== Miami Dade FC ===
- American Premier Soccer League 2016 Regular Season Champions
- American Premier Soccer League 2017 Regular Season Champions
- American Premier Soccer League 2017 APSL Champions
