= Rafael Pereira da Silva =

Rafael Pereira da Silva may refer to:

- Rafael Pereira da Silva (footballer, born 1980), Brazilian footballer for CFZ do Rio
- Rafael (footballer, born 1990), Brazilian footballer for Manchester United
