= Walid Birrou =

Spanish footballer

Personal information
- Full name: Walid Birrou
- Date of birth: September 6, 1995 (age 31)
- Place of birth: Vilanova i la Geltrú, Spain
- Height: 1.89 m (6 ft 2 in)
- Position: Goalkeeper

Team information
- Current team: Dhangadhi F.C.

Youth career
- 2011–2014: Gandía

College career
Years	Team	Apps	(Gls)
2017–2018	Oakland City University	28	(0)

Senior career*
Years	Team	Apps	(Gls)
2015–2018	CD Teruel		
2018–2019	Little Rock Rangers		
2019–2020	Atlanta SC		
2020–2021	Almagro		
2021	FC Wichita		
2021–2022	Stade Marocain		
2022	RB Keflavík	12	(0)
2022–2023	Þróttur Vogum		
2023	Njarðvík		
2023–2024	Glacis United		
2024–2025	Kaya–Iloilo		
- * Club domestic league appearances and goals

Walid Birrou Essafi (born 6 September 1995) is a Spanish professional footballer who plays as a goalkeeper.

== Personal life ==
Birrou was born in the city of Vilanova i la Geltrú in Spain and is of Moroccan heritage. He is the eldest of two brothers.

== Club career ==
=== Youth and college career ===
Until the age of 19, Birrou played for the youth team of Gandía, before playing for lower league side CD Teruel while pursuing his studies. From 2017 to 2018, he played football for Oakland City University, making 27 appearances in 2 seasons before graduating.

=== Early club career ===
After graduating, Birrou left Oakland and Teruel and signed for USL League Two side Little Rock Rangers, where he played for two seasons. He transferred to Atlanta SC in 2019 before returning to Spain and sign with Almagro CF.

After two seasons, he returned to the US to play for FC Wichita. A year later, he played in the second tier of Morocco football, playing for Stade Marocain.

=== Iceland and Gibraltar ===
In 2022 he left Stade Marocain and played for Icelandic side RB Keflavík. He stayed with them for a short while before transferring to Þróttur Vogum in the same year. In 2023, he signed with second-tier side Njarðvík.

In August that year, he transferred to the Gibraltar Football League, signing for Glacis United where he made 8 appearances and kept 2 clean sheets.

=== Kaya ===
In 2024, Birrou left Glacis United to join Filipino club Kaya–Iloilo, who were defending champions of the Philippines Football League. He made his first appearance and got his first clean sheet for the club in the opening match against United City.

== Honours ==
=== Kaya–Iloilo ===
- Philippines Football League: 2024
