= Teslim Fatusi =

Nigerian footballer (born 1977)

Personal information
- Full name: Teslim Babatunde Fatusi
- Date of birth: 17 September 1977 (age 49)
- Place of birth: Surulere, Lagos, Nigeria
- Position: Winger

Team information
- Current team: Miami Dade FC
- Number: 18

Senior career*
Years	Team	Apps	(Gls)
1992–1993	Stationery Stores		
1993–1994	ASEC Mimosas		
1994–1995	Servette	5	(2)
1995	Pécs	8	(2)
1995–1996	Ferencváros	11	(0)
1996–1997	Servette	8	(0)
1997–1998	Espérance		
1998–2000	Mamelodi Sundowns	7	(1)
2000–2001	Roeselare		
2001	Polonia Warszawa	7	(2)
2002–2003	Magdeburg		
2003–2004	Sachsen Leipzig		
2004–2005	Al-Khaleej		
2005–2006	Shooting Stars		
2007	Thể Công		
2008	Tây Ninh		
2015–2016	Upward Stars FC	3	
2016–	Miami Dade FC	2	

International career
1996	Nigeria U-23	3	(0)
1996–1999	Nigeria	4	(1)
- * Club domestic league appearances and goals

Olympic medal record

Representing Nigeria

Men's Football
Gold medal – first place	1996 Atlanta	Team competition

Teslim Babatunde Fatusi(born 17 September 1977) is an olympic gold medalist and Nigerian international footballer who played as a winger for Miami Dade FC.

== Club career ==
Born in Surulere, Lagos State, Fatusi began playing youth football with Honey Babes and Ibukun Oluwa. He joined the youth team of Stationery Stores F.C. in 1991, and signed for the senior side in 1992. He moved to Côte d'Ivoire to play for ASEC Mimosas, before embarking on a career in Europe with Swiss Super League side Servette FC.

Fatusi has had a nomadic career, playing in at least nine countries. He last played in the Vietnamese second division league.

== International career ==
Fatusi was part of Nigeria's gold medal-winning team at the 1996 Olympics.

Fatusi made several appearances for the senior Nigeria national football team. He scored on his debut, from a late penalty in a friendly against the Czech Republic in 1996.
