= Jeffrey Otoo =

Ghanaian footballer

Personal information
- Full name: Jeffrey Obiltey Otoo
- Date of birth: 21 January 1998 (age 28)
- Place of birth: Accra, Ghana
- Height: 1.76 m (5 ft 9 in)
- Positions: Forward; attacking midfielder

Team information
- Current team: Valley United
- Number: 14

Senior career*
Years	Team	Apps	(Gls)
2015–2016	Charity Stars	13	(21)
2016–2017	Atlanta United	0	(0)
2016–2017	→ Charleston Battery (loan)	10	(0)
2019	Des Moines Menace	1	(0)
2019	Atlanta SC	4	(1)
2020–2022	Atletico Atlanta		
2021–	Rome Gladiators (indoor)	3	(1)
2022–	Valley United	3	(2)
- * Club domestic league appearances and goals as of 04:24, 10 April 2022 (UTC)

Jeffrey Otoo (born 21 January 1998) is a Ghanaian footballer who plays as a midfielder for Valley United FC in the National Independent Soccer Association, and for the Rome Gladiators in the National Indoor Soccer League.

== Career ==
On 1 June 2016, Otoo signed with Major League Soccer side Atlanta United FC from second division Ghanaian side Charity Stars. He spent the 2016 season on loan with United Soccer League side Charleston Battery. Otoo was released by Atlanta on 20 November 2017.

On 27 August 2020, Otoo was named UPSL National Player of the Week while playing for Ginga Atlanta.
