= Buddy (2026 film) =

2026 film by Casper Kelly

- Theatrical release poster
- Directed by: Casper Kelly
- Written by: Casper Kelly; Jamie King
- Produced by: Tyler Davidson; Drew Sykes; Raphael Margules; J. D. Lifshitz; Tracy Rosenblum
- Starring: Cristin Milioti; Delaney Quinn; Patton Oswalt; Clint Howard; Michael Shannon; Topher Grace; Keegan-Michael Key
- Cinematography: Zach Kuperstein
- Edited by: Josh Ethier
- Music by: Michael Yezerski
- Production companies: BoulderLight Pictures; Low Spark Films
- Distributed by: Roadside Attractions and Saban Films (United States and Canada); Stage 6 Films (international) (Note: U.K. and Irish theatrical rights have been licensed to Vertigo Releasing.)
- Release dates: January 22, 2026 (Sundance); August 28, 2026 (United States)
- Running time: 96 minutes
- Country: United States
- Language: English
- Budget: $3 million
- Box office: $27 million

Buddy is a 2026 American horror film directed by Casper Kelly and written by Kelly and Jamie King. The film stars Cristin Milioti, Delaney Quinn, Patton Oswalt, Clint Howard, Michael Shannon, Topher Grace, and Keegan-Michael Key as the voice of the title character. The film follows children trapped inside a surreal 1990s Barney & Friends-style children's television series who must find a way to escape their malevolent unicorn television host.

Buddy premiered in the Midnight section of the Sundance Film Festival on January 22, 2026, and was released theatrically in the United States on August 28, 2026, by Roadside Attractions and Saban Films. The film received generally positive reviews and grossed $27 million on a $3 million budget.

== Plot ==
It's Buddy! is a 1990s-style children's television series hosted by the titular Buddy, an anthropomorphic talking orange unicorn with magical powers. Cast members include child actors Freddy, Wade, Josh, and Oliver; Buddy's co-host Betty Bunny; supporting adult characters Mailman Miles and Nurse Nancy; and sentient objects Mr. Mailbox, Couchy the Couch, Clocky the Clock, Strappy the Backpack, Lampy the Lamp, Trashy the Trash Can, and Charlie the Train.

Despite an increasingly angry Buddy's insistence, Josh refuses to participate in a dance party and mysteriously disappears. He is replaced with another child, Hannah, while Buddy assures everyone Josh is traveling to utopian Diamond City. When Freddy finds Josh's bloodstained book in the trash, she consults Nancy, who promises to talk to Buddy. Freddy and Wade later witnesses Buddy choking and bludgeoning Nancy to death before fatally punching Clocky off the wall.

Freddy and Wade convince Hannah and Oliver to escape to Diamond City inside Charlie, but Buddy rips Charlie's face off and takes Wade away. As Buddy approaches Freddy, Wade uses a cleaning spray and a lighter to burn and disfigure him. Buddy then stabs Mailman Miles to death. Freddy, Oliver, and Hannah escape with Strappy and Mr. Mailbox; the latter's mouth was torn off by Buddy after he had witnessed Buddy's killing of Josh. Freddy fails to save Wade, and Buddy impales him on his horn.

Meanwhile in the real world, a woman named Grace hires a psychic investigator who leads Grace, her husband Ben, and their sons Timothy and Derek in a ritual to contact a spirit supposedly haunting their house. The television turns on to an It's Buddy! episode, and Grace becomes convinced she had a third child they cannot remember, but Ben dismisses her. At night, Buddy's hand emerges from the screen and pulls Grace into It's Buddy!, where she takes Nancy's role.

Freddy, Oliver, and Hannah gradually realize they cannot remember their lives before meeting Buddy, though Freddy recalls vague memories of her childhood. The kids meet elderly cowboy George and his foul-mouthed marionette Willie, who were on a previous Western-themed version of It's Buddy! and have been hiding from Buddy for many years after he killed another child who jokingly sang a mocking version of the series' closing theme song. The kids pass out after eating psychedelic flower petals, and awaken to find that George and Willie have left and stolen Strappy.

Buddy finds and kills George with an axe before drowning Willie. He begins to rip Strappy to lure out the kids, who arrive on bikes and save him. The kids reach Diamond City, only to discover it's a miniature model. Buddy arrives and embraces them, ending the "episode" and resetting It's Buddy! with Mailman Justin and a new boy named Tyler, who replace Miles and Wade, respectively. When Freddy seeks out Grace for a cut on her arm, Grace recognizes Freddy as her missing daughter. Outside, Freddy, Oliver and Hannah antagonize Buddy by singing the mocking song, causing him to mutate into a larger, monstrous form, Dark Buddy. He kills Justin, Couchy, and Betty before attacking Freddy. Grace sacrifices herself to allow the remaining children to escape.

After Tyler reverts Buddy to his original form, Buddy snaps his neck and pursues the kids down the Worry Well, severing portions of his own flesh so he can fit. The kids hide in a prop room occupied by an elderly unicorn, Benny, but Buddy bursts in, killing Hannah and swallowing Oliver alive. Buddy chases Freddy through the hallway outside until Strappy trips him to fall directly onto Mr. Mailbox's post, impaling him. Buddy congratulates Freddy for being brave and tries to reset the show by singing the closing theme song, but fails and dies after insulting her. Freddy finds a gymnasium containing several televisions, each displaying a real-world house with a child watching the show from their screens before being sucked in.

Freddy bursts through one of the screens into an empty house, emerging into a living room. As Freddy breaks down in tears upon discovering that Strappy and Mr. Mailbox have turned into lifeless objects, the father of the Spanish-speaking family at whose house she landed approaches and asks who she is.

== Cast ==
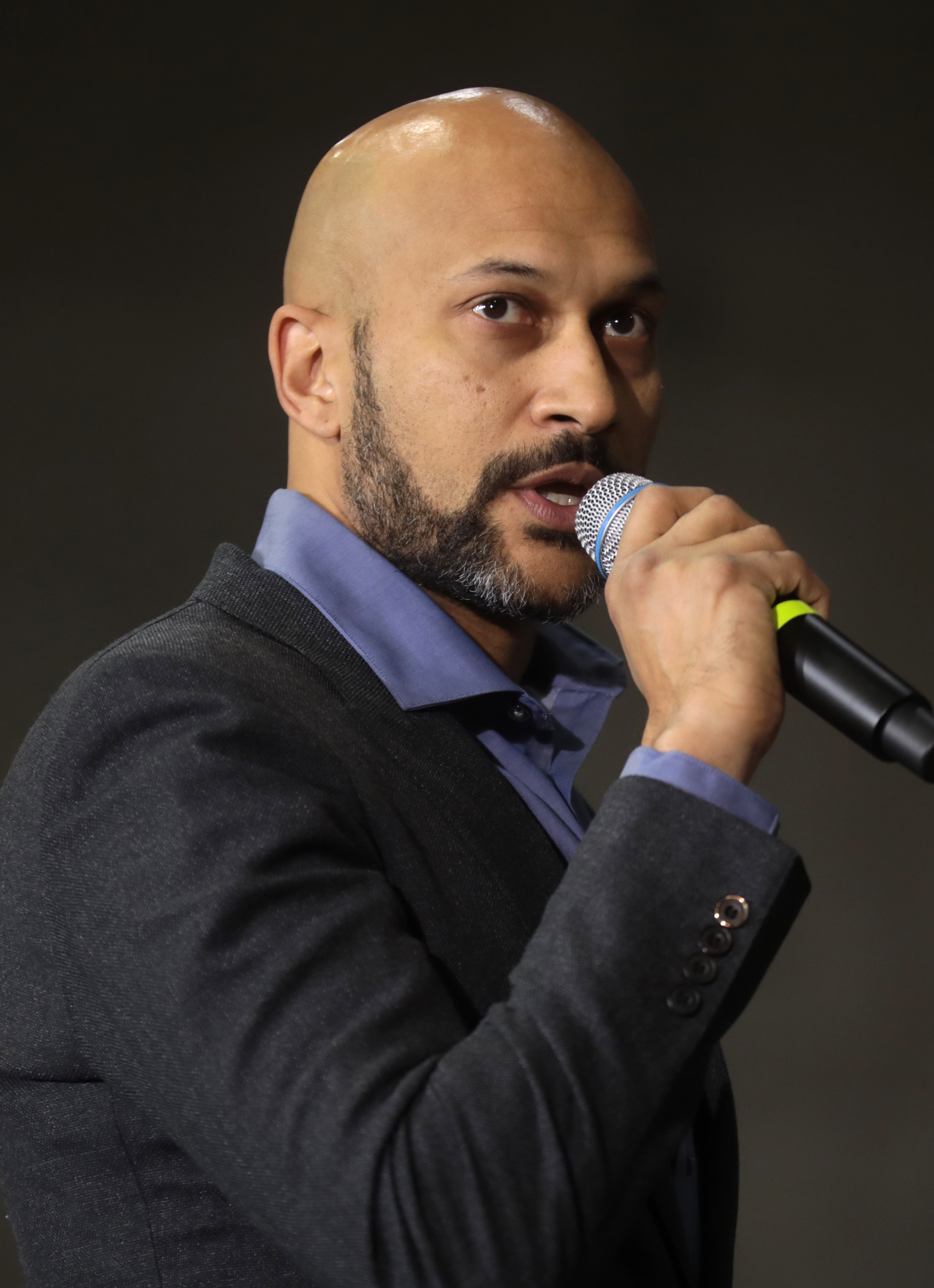
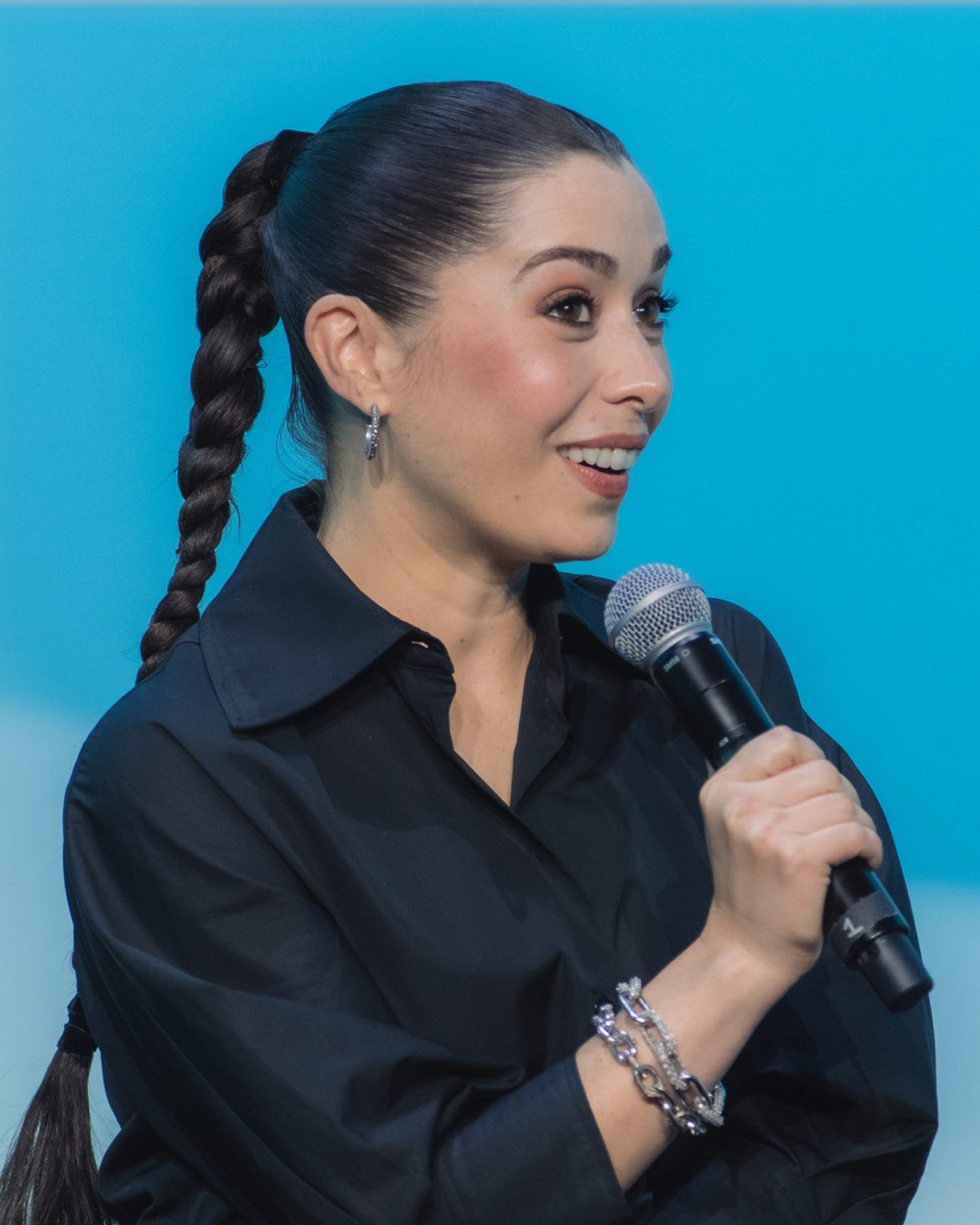
Lead actors Keegan-Michael Key and Cristin Milioti
- Cristin Milioti as Grace, a woman who gets drawn into the series It's Buddy! as a replacement for Nurse Nancy
- Delaney Quinn as Freddy, Grace's missing middle daughter who was made into a character in the show
- Tristan Borders as Oliver, a child who was made into a character in the show
- Madison Skyy Polan as Hannah, Josh's replacement who was made into a character in the show
- Caleb "CJ" Williams as Wade, a child who was made into a character in the show
- Luke Speakman as Josh, a child who was made into a character in the show
- Clint Howard as George, a former child from a previous version of the show with Willie
- Topher Grace as Ben, Grace's husband
- Bennie Taylor as Mailman Miles, a man who was made into a character in the show
- Phuong Kubacki as Nurse Nancy, a woman who was made into a character in the show
- Seamus Flynn as Timothy, Grace's younger son
- Bryson JonSteele as Derek, Grace's older son
- Brooke Bloom as Dr. Deborah Burr, a psychic investigator
- Tory Jacqui Malone as Tyler, Wade's replacement who was made into a character in the show
- Conner Stumm as Mailman Justin, Mailman Miles' replacement who was made into a character in the show
- Eric Salazar as a Spanish-speaking man who was grilling when Freddy ended up in his house

=== Voices ===
- Keegan-Michael Key as Buddy, an anthropomorphic orange unicorn who stars on It's Buddy!
- Patton Oswalt as Strappy, a talking backpack
- Michael Shannon as Willie, a marionette that was on a previous version of Buddy's show with George
- Jimmica Collins as:
  - Betty Bunny, an anthropomorphic rabbit and Buddy's co-host
  - A scared flower that Buddy interrogates
- Devon Hawkes Ludlow as Charlie, an anthropomorphic train with arms
- Eric Bauza as:
  - Mr. Mailbox, a talking mailbox
  - Couchy, a yellow couch in blue glasses
  - Worry Well, a magical well that emits different items
  - Trashy, a bow tie-wearing trash can
  - Pee Flower, a purple flower that Oliver urinates on

=== Puppeteers ===
- Sergey Zhuravsky as the in-suit performer of Buddy
- Jonathan Yurco as the in-suit performer of Buddy's monstrous form (credited as "Dark Buddy")
- Jimmica Collins as the face performance of Buddy
- Cedwan Hooks as the in-suit performer of Betty Bunny
- Lynette Eklund as the in-suit performer of Benny, an anthropomorphic yellow unicorn who starred on It's Buddy! and now works as a mute prop maker beneath the set
- Rachel Applebaum as:
  - Clocky, a clock with arms
  - Mr. Mailbox
- Devon Hawkes Ludlow as Charlie
- Michael Serwich as Willie

== Production ==
=== Development ===
In 2025, producers J. D. Lifshitz, Raphael Margules and Tracy Rosenblum approached filmmaker Casper Kelly to develop a horror film based on Barney & Friends. Kelly's concept for the independent project was influenced by his experiences as a parent watching television programs from his childhood with his own children, including Barney, Pee-wee's Playhouse, Blue's Clues, Dora the Explorer, The Backyardigans, Little Einsteins, Thomas and Friends, and Victorious. He noted that as a child, he believed that the characters actually lived within their respective series and often wondered about their unshown everyday activities, a premise that ultimately formed the narrative basis for the film. He was struck by the characters' "unnaturally idealized" behavior and "spontaneous" musical numbers, which he jokingly likened to a form of psychological conditioning.

Kelly directed the film, initially titled Arnie and later renamed Buddy, and wrote the screenplay with Jamie King. During development, Kelly and King wanted to expand on themes of forced cheerfulness and the anxiety of being trapped inside a surreal media environment, expanding on elements previously explored in the former's 2014 short film Too Many Cooks. Lifshitz, Margules and Rosenblum produced the film under their BoulderLight Pictures banner, while Tyler Davidson and Drew Sykes produced for Low Spark Films, which co-financed the film. Roberto Linck, Sipur Studios and Substance served as executive producers.

According to Kelly, additional rules and references to children's television shows (such as Teletubbies) were originally planned but cut due to runtime constraints, though he has expressed interest in exploring them in a potential sequel.

=== Casting ===
On July 22, 2025, it was announced that Cristin Milioti would star in the film. Later that month, Topher Grace joined the cast. In August 2025, Delaney Quinn was cast in the lead role of Freddy Gardner. Antonella Rose had auditioned for the role, but was passed due to not looking young enough. In December 2025, Keegan-Michael Key, Michael Shannon, and Patton Oswalt were revealed to have joined the film.

=== Filming ===
Principal photography began on the week of July 22, 2025, shot by Zach Kuperstein using the Sony CineAlta Venice 2, and lasted 25 days. Filming took place in the Northeast Ohio locations of Brooklyn (at TRG Multimedia), Solon, and Burton. Kelly and Kuperstein used an aspect ratio of 4:3 and flat, even lighting for the film's first act to imitate the style of 1990s children's television series before transitioning into traditional horror lighting. The film's visual style was managed by production designer Anna Kathleen. Embracing an "artificial aesthetic" in favor of realism, Kathleen utilized a restrictive colour palette of oranges, yellows, purples and pinks, while limiting the use of primary reds to preserve an "almost kinder and scholastic" visual tone for Buddy's orange color. The set design was inspired by The Wizard of Oz, Pee-wee's Playhouse, and Kathleen's personal upbringing on a ranch in Colorado.

The costumes and puppets for the characters were designed by Shawna-Nova Foley, Devon Hawkes Ludlow (who specifically created Buddy) and Chris Brown. Initial design concepts for Buddy featured small, askew eye pupils to give the character a "crazy and menacing" look. However, Kelly requested changes so that Buddy would appear outwardly friendly and innocent, allowing the horror elements to rely on the character's changing expressions against an otherwise impassive face.

== Release ==
Buddy premiered at the Sundance Film Festival in Park City and Salt Lake City, Utah, on January 22, 2026.

In April 2026, Roadside Attractions and Saban Films acquired North American distribution rights to the film, scheduling it for a theatrical release on September 4, 2026. It was later moved up to August 28. The film opened to $5.3 million on August 28, 2026; it was the first Roadside Attractions film since the COVID-19 pandemic to earn $20 million at the United States/Canada box office.

In October 2026, Sony Pictures Worldwide Acquisitions beat out several companies to acquire international distribution rights to the film in a deal reported to be in the "high seven figures".

Buddy was released digitally on October 13, 2026, and will be released on Blu-ray and DVD on December 8, 20‌26.

== Reception ==
=== Box office ===
As of November 2026, Buddy has grossed $27 million in the United States and Canada.

The film made $2.2 million on its first day and debut grossing $5.4 million.

=== Critical response ===
On the review aggregator website Rotten Tomatoes, 88% of 138 critics' reviews are positive, with an average rating of 7.0/10. The website's consensus reads: "Buddy weaponizes the cheery conventions of children's entertainment into an inventive, hilarious, and creepy descent into pop culture madness." Metacritic, which uses a weighted average, assigned the film a score of 67 out of 100, based on 22 critics, indicating "generally favorable" reviews.

Former Barney & Friends voice actor Dean Wendt praised the film, highlighting Keegan-Michael Key's portrayal of Buddy and noting that the set design reminded him of his work on the original series.

== See also ==
- A Wrinkle in Time - a nod to this novel is seen in the film as A Wrinkle in Reality
- I Love You, You Hate Me - Documentary miniseries about the creation of Barney & Friends alongside the backlash the series received
- Mr. Crocket – a 2024 horror film with the same theme
- Postmodern horror
- Stay Tuned – a 1992 comedy film with the same theme
