= Paulinho Le Petit =

Brazilian footballer

Personal information
- Full name: Paulo Henrique Petit Carrera da Silva
- Date of birth: 23 February 1989 (age 37)
- Place of birth: São Carlos, Brazil
- Height: 1.86 m (6 ft 1 in)
- Position: Attacking midfielder

Senior career*
Years	Team	Apps	(Gls)
2007–2008	Votoraty		
2008	Grêmio Osasco		
2009	São Bento		
2009	Desportivo Brasil		
2010–2011	Fort Lauderdale Strikers	29	(1)
2011	Los Angeles Galaxy (reserves)		
2012	Americano-RJ		
2012	São Bento	13	(1)
2013	Tupi	0	(0)
2014	Miami Dade	4	(3)
2015	Democrata-GV	10	(0)
2015	Vitória da Conquista	0	(0)
2015	Rio Claro	0	(0)
2016	Veranópolis	3	(1)
2016	Jacutinga	0	(0)
2017	Batatais	17	(1)
2017	Portuguesa	0	(0)
2017	Penapolense	0	(0)
2018	Patrocinense	0	(0)
2018	Batatais	2	(0)
2019	Itumbiara	5	(0)
2019	Vitória da Conquista	3	(1)
2019	Almirante Barroso	11	(0)
2020	Camboriú	9	(1)
2020	Atlético Itajaí	2	(0)
2021	Guarani de Palhoça	7	(0)
- * Club domestic league appearances and goals

Paulo Henrique Petit Carrera da Silva (born 23 February 1989), known as Paulinho Le Petit, is a Brazilian retired footballer who played as an attacking midfielder.

== Career ==
=== Brazil ===
Born in São Carlos, Le Petit began his career in his native Brazil, playing for Votoraty, Grêmio Osasco, São Bento and Desportivo Brasil.

=== United States ===
Le Petit moved to the United States in March 2010 when he was signed by USSF Division 2 club Miami FC, a result of Miami FC owner Traffic Sports ongoing relationship with Desportivo Brasil. He played 14 games and scored 1 goal for Miami before converting over to the Fort Lauderdale Strikers prior to the beginning of the 2011 North American Soccer League season.

On June 8, 2014 Le Petit signed with Miami Dade FC.
