= Joao Guilherme Garcia =

Brazilian-American sports manager

Joao Garcia
Personal information
- Full name: Joao Guilherme Palmier Haase Garcia
- Date of birth: July 17, 1986 (age 40)
- Place of birth: Rio de Janeiro, Brazil
- Height: 6 ft 2 in (1.88 m)
- Position: Centre back

Team information
- Current team: Atlanta SC

Youth career
- Years: Team
- 2008–2011: Barry University

Managerial career
- 2012–2013: Barry University (assistant)
- 2013-2014: Andrew College
- 2014–2015: Miami Dade FC
- 2015-2016: Florida National University
- 2016-2018: Barry University
- 2017-2019: Brazil 6v6 National Team
- 2018-2019: LSA PRO
- 2019-present: Atlanta SC

Joao Garcia (born July 17, 1986, in Rio de Janeiro, Brazil) is the general manager of the Ginga Atlanta, a UPSL team.

== Player ==
Garcia attended Barry University where he played on the men's soccer team from 2008 to 2011. Winning two Conference Championships and qualifying three times for the NCAA National Tournament. He was named as an All Conference Player and an All Region Player.

== Coach ==
Garcia began his coaching career as an assistant at Barry University in 2012.

From 2011 until 2017 he coached at the university level. Starting as assistant coach at Barry University where he stayed one season while also being head coach at ATM High School where he was awarded Florida State Coach of the year.

He then went onto coach at Andrew College in Georgia in 2013. After which he moved back to Miami where he took charge of Miami Dade FC in the club's inaugural season, winning the championship in undefeated fashion. The following season he work at the Fort Lauderdale Strikers (2006-2016) as a tactical analyst. From there he was hired at Florida National University and started the first ever men's soccer team in school history. After two years at FNU Joao moved back to coach for two more seasons at Barry University.

In 2017 Joao was appointed head coach of both the Brazil Indoor Soccer National Team and the 6v6 Brazil Minifootball National Team. He led Brazil in the 6v6 World Cup in Tunisia, and in the Copa America in Guatemala, where the team ended with the best attack and best defense of the tournament.

Joao is currently the assistant coach at Atlanta Soccer Club and serves as the Director of youth and player development for the USA Footvolley Association.

== Experience ==
Holding a UEFA C License from Germany, CONMEBOL B License from Argentina, and both a US Soccer License and United Soccer Coaches Diploma, Joao Garcia continues to seek further coaching education.

Along with the coaching certificates, he has been on internships on 4 continents.

Most importantly spending a 3-week period with Pep Guardiola at Bayern Munich. He has also spent 10 days with Paris Saint Germain, 7 days with coach Tite (football manager) with the Brazil National Team, 10 days with Flamengo at the start of 2019. Going to India to learn from Zico for 2 weeks at FC Goa, and also spending 4 weeks with Alessandro Nesta at Miami FC during the club's first ever season.

On the international level Garcia has been able to watch from the sidelines when a couple National Teams practiced at Barry University during his time at the institution. Including the Spain National Team when they went on a run as the most dominant force in world Football. The England National Team held a part of their World Cup 2014 preparation at the school. Germany also trained a couple of days on the campus. As well as the USA National Team on some occasions.

=== Miami Dade FC ===
'NAL  CHAMPION 2014
'American Premier Soccer League  2016 Regular Season Champions
'American Premier Soccer League  2017 Regular Season Champions

=== Barry University ===
'NCAA National Champions 2018

=== Florida National University ===
'USCAA National Champions 2017 & 2018

=== Atlanta SC ===
'NISA Nisa Showcase 2019
