= Prince Saydee =

Liberian footballer (born 1996)

Personal information
- Full name: Prince Saydee
- Date of birth: 20 February 1993 (age 33)
- Place of birth: Monrovia, Liberia
- Height: 5 ft 11 in (1.80 m)
- Positions: Midfielder; winger

Team information
- Current team: Charlotte Independence
- Number: 7

Senior career*
Years	Team	Apps	(Gls)
2012–2013	Invincible Eleven		
2013–2018	Barrack Young Controllers FC	47	(23)
2018	LISCR FC		
2019	Atlanta SC	4	(1)
2020	Miami FC	11	(1)
2021	Phoenix Rising	23	(1)
2022−2023	Hartford Athletic	64	(14)
2024	Rhode Island FC	10	(0)
2024	Charleston Battery	15	(0)
2025	Westchester SC	26	(5)
2026−	Charlotte Independence	19	(3)

International career^{‡}
2013	Liberia	1	(0)
- * Club domestic league appearances and goals as of 1 November 2026 ‡ National team caps and goals as of 20 February 2017

Prince Saydee (born 20 February 1993) is a Liberian footballer who currently plays for Charlotte Independence in the USL League One.

== Club career ==
After spending his early years in his native Liberia, Saydee spent time on trial with Slovak side Slovan Bratislava in 2016. In 2019, Saydee joined Atlanta SC in the United States. In January 2020, Saydee joined USL Championship side Miami FC. Saydee was signed by Phoenix Rising FC on 4 January 2021.

On 19 January 2022, Saydee signed for USL Championship club Hartford Athletic.

Saydee joined Rhode Island FC in December 2023, ahead of their inaugural USL Championship season. Saydee played ten league games and one U.S. Open Cup game in the 2024 season for RIFC before his rights were sold to the Charleston Battery.

== International career ==
Saydee was called up to the Liberian national team for a series of World Cup qualifying matches in 2013, making his debut on 7 September 2013 against Angola.
