= Roadside Attractions =

American film distribution and production company

Roadside Attractions, LLC
- Type: Private
- Industry: Motion pictures
- Founded: 2003; 23 years ago
- Founders: Howard Cohen; Eric d'Arbeloff
- Headquarters: Los Angeles, California, United States
- Services: Film distribution; Film production
- Owner: Lionsgate Studios (43%)
- Website: www.roadsideattractions.com

Roadside Attractions, LLC is an American independent film distributor and production company with a primary focus on acquisitions. Based in Los Angeles, California, the company was founded by Howard Cohen and Eric d'Arbeloff, who serve as the co-presidents.

== History ==
Roadside Attractions, LLC was established in late 2003 as a U.S. theatrical distribution company focused on film acquisitions. It was founded by Howard Cohen, then with United Talent Agency, and independent film producer Eric d'Arbeloff. Prior to co-founding the company, Cohen had served as an acquisitions executive at Samuel Goldwyn Films from 1987 to 1994. d'Arbeloff had produced films such as Trick (1999) and Lovely & Amazing (2002) under the Roadside Attractions banner before becoming a formal distribution company.

Shortly after its founding, Roadside entered into a co-distribution partnership with Samuel Goldwyn Films and Independent Distribution Partners (IDP), through which the companies jointly released a slate of films, sharing both costs and revenues equally. The companies acquired their first film, a fast food documentary Super Size Me, at the 2004 Sundance Film Festival. In May 2007, it was reported that Roadside had opted not to renew its partnership following the expiration of the contract at the end of 2006. Later in 2007, Lionsgate Films purchased a minority stake in Roadside. Lionsgate also distributes Roadside's films in the U.S. home entertainment market and controls their pay 1 theatrical output deals.

In 2016, Roadside partnered with Amazon Studios to release films theatrically. After releasing a half dozen of films together, the partnership ended in 2019 when Amazon shifted to distributing its films independently. In August 2022, it was reported that Roadside entered into a multi-year streaming deal with Hulu for the post-theatrical pay 1 window. Call Jane and Gigi & Nate were the first films released under the deal.

== Filmography ==
In 2018, faith-based film I Can Only Imagine exceeded box-office projections, earning $17.1 million from 1,629 theaters during its opening weekend despite estimates of $2–8 million opening weekend. It ultimately grossed $83.5 million in the United States and Canada, becoming Roadside Attractions' highest-grossing release. In 2026, the dark comedy horror film Buddy delivered the company's second-largest opening weekend with $5.36 million on 1,258 screens.

=== Top 10 highest-grossing films ===
Rank	Title	Year	U.S. Gross	Budget
1	I Can Only Imagine	2018	$83,482,352	$7,000,000
2	Manchester by the Sea	2016	$47,695,371	$8,500,000
3	Buddy	2026	$26,977,583	$3,000,000
4	Judy	2019	$24,319,961	$10,000,000
5	Mud	2013	$21,590,086	$10,000,000
6	The Peanut Butter Falcon	2019	$20,457,158	$6,200,000
7	A Most Wanted Man	2014	$17,237,855	$15,000,000
8	Forever My Girl	2018	$16,376,066	$3,500,000
9	Hello, My Name Is Doris	2016	$14,444,999	$1,000,000
10	Love & Friendship	2016	$14,016,568	$3,000,000
