= Gabriel Hoyos =

American soccer player (born 1989)

Personal information
- Date of birth: March 3, 1989 (age 37)
- Place of birth: Armenia, Colombia
- Height: 1.85 m (6 ft 1 in)
- Position: Midfielder

Youth career
- –2008: Weston Fury High School

Senior career*
Years	Team	Apps	(Gls)
2008–2009	SC Freiburg II		
2010–2011	Miami FC	2	(0)
2014	Miami Dade FC	5	(1)

International career
2009–2010	United States U20	10	(0)
- * Club domestic league appearances and goals

Gabriel Hoyos (born March 3, 1989) is a professional soccer player who plays as a midfielder. Born in Colombia, he represented the United States at youth level.

== Career ==
Hoyos has played for the reserves of Bundesliga club SC Freiburg.

He made his international debut for United States U20 in 2009.

On May 30, 2014, Hoyos made his official debut for Miami Dade FC in a win over Nacional SC.
