= Rilwan Salawu =

Nigerian soccer player (born 1987)

Rilwan FHW
Personal information
- Full name: Rilwan Oluwatobi FHW
- Date of birth: 3 December 1987 (age 38)
- Place of birth: Lagos, Nigeria
- Height: 1.70 m (5 ft 7 in)
- Position: Midfielder

Team information
- Current team: Electsports FC
- Number: 55

Youth career
- 1996–1998: Pepsi Academy

Senior career*
Years	Team	Apps	(Gls)
2009–2010	Max Bees		
2012	Brooklyn Knights	16	(4)
2012	FC JAX Destroyers	14	(3)
2013	Kurtalanspor		
2014	Westchester Flames	6	(2)
2015–2016	Kjellerup IF		
2016–2017	Bulancakspor		
2017–2018	Belmopan Bandits	26	(0)
2019–2020	Atlanta SC	0	(0)
2022–2023	Ole FC		(3)
2023–	Electsports FC		
- * Club domestic league appearances and goals

Rilwan FHW (born 3 December 1987), formerly known as Rilwan Salawu, is a Nigerian-born American soccer player who plays for Electsports FC of Limbe in the Cameroon First Division. He plays primarily as a defensive midfielder, but has played as a striker or holding midfielder in the past.

== Early life ==
He was born in Lagos, Nigeria where he was a member of the Pepsi Academy. He moved to Brooklyn, New York at a young age and soon developed an interest in basketball and played varsity basketball at Franklin Delano Roosevelt High School, but he opted to play soccer at the college level.

== Club career ==
He played soccer briefly for SUNY Cobleskill in upstate New York and then transferred to SUNY Binghamton in 2008. He was officially invited to join the Nigerian U-20 side, while on a trip to Nigeria in the summer of 2008. The team was then coached by Ladan Bosso and they were preparing for the 2009 U-20 African Qualification Tournament in Sudan. His late birthday was days before the cut-off and this prevented him from making the final selection of the Nigeria U-20 team, however this opportunity kick-started his professional football career.

He went on to play for Maxbees FC, a second division team in Ghana, and several Premier Development League (PDL) teams in the United States, most notably the Brooklyn Knights, the Westchester Flames and the FC JAX Destroyers. He then moved to Europe and played for Kjellerup IF in the Danish 2nd Division, where he featured in the DBU Cup, and in Turkey for Kurtalanspor and Bulancakspor.

He joined the Belmopan Bandits in Belize in 2017, and featured in their inaugural CONCACAF League appearance. In 2018, he continued with the Belmopan Bandits and won the Belize Premier League and a second qualification for the CONCACAF League. He won the 2018–19 Belize Premier League again and also featured in the 2018 CONCACAF League.

In the 2022–2023 season, he played for Ole FC in the American UPSL, scoring 3 goals and providing 7 assists. He captained the side to win the conference and regional championships, leading them to the Elite 8 of the national tournament before losing to Columbus Crew.

In 2023, he joined Elect Sports FC in Limbe, Cameroon, and made an immediate impact by scoring the fastest goal in league history during his debut, netting the ball in the first minute of the game.

== International career ==
He was invited to join the Nigerian U-20 side in 2008, coached by Ladan Bosso, but did not make the final selection due to his late birthday. Despite this, he remains active from the 2008 class of Flying Eagles and aspires to represent Nigeria at the senior level.

== Personal life ==
On January 28, 2023, Rilwan changed his last name from Salawu to FHW, marking the 25th anniversary of his move from Nigeria to the U.S., with the acronym "FHW" standing for Faith & Hard Work.
