= Tiago Fernandes =

Tiago Fernandes may refer to:

- Tiago Fernandes (Portuguese footballer) (born 1981), Portuguese football manager and former player
- Tiago Fernandes (Brazilian footballer) (born 1990), Brazilian football player
- Tiago Fernandes (tennis) (born 1993), Brazilian tennis player

== See also ==
- Thiago Fernández (born 2004), Argentinian footballer
