= William Eyang =

Cameroonian footballer

Personal information
- Full name: William Guy Roger Eyang
- Date of birth: January 27, 1994 (age 32)
- Place of birth: Nkoumadjap, Cameroon
- Height: 6 ft 2 in (1.88 m)
- Position: Forward

Team information
- Current team: Nona FC
- Number: 9

Senior career*
Years	Team	Apps	(Gls)
2012–2015	Union Douala		
2015	Bodens BK	26	(15)
2016	Orlando City B	4	(0)
2017	Orlando Storm		
2018	Inter Orlando		
2018	America SC		
2019	Central Florida Panthers	6	(3)
2019	Atlanta SC	4	(0)
2020–2022	Florida Tropics (indoor)	3	(0)
2021	Florida Tropics		(20)
2021	Central Florida Panthers	3	(1)
2022	Pittsburgh Riverhounds	4	(0)
2023	Nona FC		
- * Club domestic league appearances and goals as of December 16, 2022

William Eyang (born January 27, 1994) is a Cameroonian footballer who plays as a forward.

== Career ==
Eyang was acquired by Orlando City B in January 2016.

Following a successful tryout, Eyang was signed by Central Florida Panthers SC ahead of its inaugural season in the National Premier Soccer League. In his fourth game with the side, Eyang scored twice and helped the Panthers earn their first win in team history.

In late 2019, Eyang signed with professional side Atlanta SC prior to the inaugural National Independent Soccer Association season.

In February 2020, Eyang joined Florida Tropics SC of the Major Arena Soccer League.

While playing with the Tropics outdoor side, Eyang won the United Premier Soccer League Spring 2021 Golden Boot, scoring 20 goals.

Eyang signed with Pittsburgh Riverhounds SC of the USL Championship on January 18, 2022.
