= Valley United FC =

- Full name: Valley United Football Club
- Founded: 2020
- Dissolved: 2022; 4 years ago
- Stadium: Bell Bank Park; Mesa, Arizona
- Capacity: 5,000
- LLC Members: Majority-Troy Pearce, Yuval Raichman, Adrian Gaitan, Marcelo Piana
- Chairman: Troy M Pearce (Managing Member)
- Head Coach: Danny De Olivera
- League: National Independent Soccer Association
Home colours

Valley United FC was an American professional soccer club based in Phoenix, Arizona that played in the National Independent Soccer Association, in the 3rd tier of the US soccer pyramid, from 2022.

== History ==
Valley United FC was founded in 2020 as Atletico Olympians FC and joined UPSL in the same year, as played in the Southwest Conference, Arizona Division. In the summer of 2021, the team also participated in 2021 NISA Independent Cup, as played in Southwest Region. In September 2021, the team rebranded as "Valley United Football Club" and was accepted into the National Independent Soccer Association (NISA) for the 2022 season. Valley United FC was the first Latino-owned club in the nascent league. At the time of their founding, VUFC was one of three professional soccer teams in Arizona alongside USL Championship side Phoenix Rising FC and USL1 club FC Tucson. The club's reserve team, Valley United FC U23 participated in the Southwest Region of the NISA Nation, at an amateur soccer league sanctioned by the US Amateur Soccer Association.

The club participated in the 2022 Lamar Hunt US Open Cup competition, falling 0–1 in the second round to cross-town rival Phoenix Rising in extra time.

On May 17, 2022, the team announced that they were working through "internal roster issues at the club" which resulted in the resignation of Head Coach Adrian Gaitan and General Manager Yuval Raichman and Danny De Olivera was promoted to the team's head coach. The issues, identified as alleged violations of United States Immigration law, involved six players, who were released from the club. The roster violations resulted in a forfeit of six league matches. The team went on to play three more matches before suspending operations for the season on July 26, 2022. To promote "sporting integrity," all VUFC results were removed, ultimately resulting in a forfeit of the entire season.

== Players ==
=== Current roster ===
As of April 1, 2022

Note: Flags indicate national team as defined under FIFA eligibility rules; some limited exceptions apply. Players may hold more than one non-FIFA nationality.

No.	Pos.	Nation	Player
1	GK	USA	Samuel Howard
3	DF	COL	Gustavo Vargas
4	DF	PAR	Samuel Cáceres
5	MF	USA	Nicholas Gaitan
7	MF	MEX	Ricardo Gordillo-Velazquez
8	MF	USA	Luis Gil
9	FW	USA	Alexander Tejera
10	MF	ARG	Sebastian Contreras
11	FW	ESP	Mustafa Troncoso
12	DF	COL	David Diosa
13	GK	ESP	Javier Olmedo
14	MF	GHA	Jeffrey Otoo

No.	Pos.	Nation	Player
15	MF	DMA	Gylles Mitchel
16	DF	USA	Kyle Nelson
18	DF	FRA	Robin Lafarge
22	FW	USA	Ricardo Velazco
23	DF	USA	Stephen Elias
24	MF	USA	Facundo Canete
25	MF	USA	Nathan Monsanto
27	DF	USA	Daniel Herrera
29	MF	USA	Robert Byron Jacobs
42	DF	CMR	David Koloko
99	FW	USA	Ty Meagher
