= Kurt Linck =

Kurt Linck (born 1889), was a German writer of the Religiongeschichteschule. He wrote in Latin, about the non-Biblical references to Jesus. His works are cited as a reliable source (e.g. for the usualness of the name Chrestus in the Roman Empire) in books written in the 1920s (Judentum und Heidentum zur Zeit Christi und der Apostel by Dr. Joseph Felten [1851 - 1929], 1925, Jesus the Nazarene: Myth or History by Maurice Goguel, 1926) and in modern works (e.g. The Jesus of the Early Christians by G. A. Wells, 1971, Jesus Outside the New Testament: An Introduction to the Ancient Evidence, Robert E. Van Voorst, 2000, Den Jesus som aldrig funnits, Roger Viklund, 2005).

== Bibliography ==
- De antiquissimis veterum quae ad Iesum Nazarenum spectant testimoniis (Verlag von Alfred Töpelmann, Giessen 1913) - Linck examines the supposed testimonies of Pliny, Tacitus, Suetonius and Josephus. It was reviewed in The Truth about Jesus (The American Journal of Theology, Vol. 17, No. 4 (Oct., 1913), pp. 627–630).
- De Taciti quod ad Christianos spectattestimonio (1913)
