= Gabriel (footballer, born 1981) =

Brazilian footballer

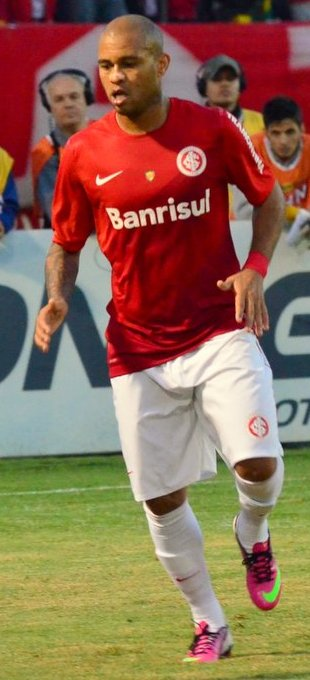
- Gabriel in 2013

Personal information
- Full name: Gabriel Rodrigues dos Santos
- Date of birth: 5 June 1981 (age 45)
- Place of birth: São Paulo, Brazil
- Height: 1.71 m (5 ft 7 1/2 in)
- Position: Right wing-back

Youth career
- 2000–2001: São Paulo

Senior career*
Years	Team	Apps	(Gls)
2001–2005	São Paulo	62	(8)
2005	Fluminense	65	(26)
2005–2006	Málaga	17	(2)
2006–2007	→ Cruzeiro (loan)	16	(12)
2007–2008	Fluminense	44	(10)
2008–2011	Panathinaikos	35	(6)
2010–2011	→ Grêmio (loan)	23	(5)
2011–2012	Grêmio	13	(3)
2013	Internacional	24	(2)
2015–2017	Fort Lauderdale Strikers	19	(7)
2017	Miami Dade	10	(15)

International career
2005	Brazil	1	(0)
- * Club domestic league appearances and goals

Gabriel Rodrigues dos Santos (born 5 June 1981), commonly known as just Gabriel, is a Brazilian former footballer, who played mostly as a wing-back down the right hand side of the pitch. He earned his only full cap for the Brazil national team in a friendly win against Guatemala on 27 April 2005.

== Career ==
He has spent most of his career in his native Brazil, having started in São Paulo and reaching his peak while playing for Fluminense in 2005 and 2007. He had a short spell playing for Málaga at Spanish La Liga in 2006, but was unable to prevent the club's relegation and returned to play for Cruzeiro.

After being released by Cruzeiro on 22 May 2007, Gabriel signed for one of his former clubs, Fluminense, on 25 August 2007. He played an important role in the team's Copa Libertadores performance, ending up as runners up.

On 17 July 2008, he agreed terms with Panathinaikos at a cost of €1.2 million. He was brought in as the new attacking minded right full back but it seems that he needed more work in his defensive game for the European standards. For that reason, Panathinaikos manager Henk ten Cate used Gabriel mainly as a right midfielder or winger in 4–2–3–1 and 4–3–2–1 formations.

In August 2010, Gabriel moved to Brazilian side Grêmio on loan. The move was made permanent in July 2011.

Gabriel transferred to Internacional in January 2013.

On 23 July 2015, Gabriel signed with Fort Lauderdale Strikers of the North American Soccer League.

On 7 May Gabriel made his debut for Miami Dade alongside former Brazil Captain Emerson Ferreira da Rosa, scoring 1 goal in a 3x1 victory against Jupiter United. On 2 July, he won the 2017 Regular Season Championship undefeated in his first year with the club.

== Honours ==
=== Club ===
São Paulo

- Tournament Rio – São Paulo: 2001
- São Paulo State League: 2002

Fluminense

- Rio de Janeiro State League: 2005

Panathinaikos

- Super League Greece: 2009–10
- Greek Football Cup: 2010

Internacional

- Campeonato Gaúcho: 2013

Miami Dade FC

- APSL Regular Season Champions: 2017
- APSL Champions: 2017

=== Individual ===
- Campeonato Brasileiro Série A Team of the Year: 2005
