= Link (surname) =

Link is an English and German surname. Notable people with the surname include:

- Bruce Link (b. 1949), American epidemiologist
- Edwin Albert Link (1904–1981), American inventor and engineer
- Evan Link (b. 2004), American football player
- Godehard Link (b. 1944), German philosopher
- Helmut Link (1927–2009), German politician
- Johann Heinrich Friedrich Link (1767–1850), German naturalist and botanist
- John F. Link Sr. (1901–1968), director and Oscar-nominated American film editor
- John F. Link, son of John F. Link Sr., Academy Award nominated film editor of Die Hard
- Kelly Link (b. 1969), American editor and author of short stories
- Michael Georg Link (b. 1963), German politician
- Rick Link (1959–2026), American professional wrestler
- Sören Link (b. 1976), German politician (SPD)
- Susan Link (b. 1979), German journalist
- William Link (1933–2020), American film and television writer and producer
