= Rafael (footballer, born 1980) =

Brazilian footballer

Personal information
- Full name: Rafael Pereira da Silva
- Date of birth: 13 March 1980 (age 46)
- Place of birth: Ilha Solteira, São Paulo, Brazil
- Height: 1.82 m (5 ft 11 1/2 in)
- Positions: Right back; wingback

Team information
- Current team: Miami Dade FC

Youth career
- 1995–1998: Guarani

Senior career*
Years	Team	Apps	(Gls)
1999–2000	Guarani	31	(1)
2001	Vasco	17	(1)
2002	São Paulo	13	(0)
2003	São Caetano	1	(0)
2003–2004	Flamengo	12	(2)
2004–2006	Messina	41	(2)
2007–2008	Fluminense	23	(3)
2009	Goiás	1	(0)
2010	Bahia	0	(0)
2011	CFZ do Rio	0	(0)
2018–	Miami Dade FC	2	(0)
- * Club domestic league appearances and goals

Rafael Pereira da Silva (Brazilian Portuguese: [ʁafaˈɛw peˈɾejɾɐ dɐ ˈsiwvɐ]; born 13 March 1980) is a Brazilian former right back who last played for Miami Dade FC.

== Playing career ==
In July 2004, he was signed by Serie A team Messina.

He signed a two-year contract with Fluminense in January 2007. On 26 May 2009 Goiás have signed the unattached right-back until the end of season.

In January 2010 he was signed by Bahia but released in June.

He was linked to America (RJ) on 24 February 2011 but the deal never turned official. In March 2011 he left for CFZ do Rio.

On 1 May 2018, he signed with Miami Dade FC.

== Coaching career ==
In October 2016 Rafael starting coaching youth soccer as a volunteer give back to his local community. Rafael currently coaches and plays for Miami Dade FC in Florida.

== Honours ==
- Campeonato Carioca: 2004
- Brazilian Cup: 2007
