= Tiago Fernandes (Brazilian footballer) =

Brazilian footballer (born 1990)

Personal information
- Full name: Tiago Fernandes dos Santos e Sousa
- Date of birth: 20 November 1990 (age 35)
- Place of birth: Belo Horizonte, Brazil
- Height: 1.91 m (6 ft 3 in)
- Position: Midfielder

Youth career
- 2004–2005: Cruzeiro
- 2005–2006: PSV Eindhoven

Senior career*
Years	Team	Apps	(Gls)
2006–2007	Cruzeiro		
2007–2008	PSV Eindhoven		
2008–2009	CFZ do Rio		
2010–2011	CD Alcoyano B		
2012–2013	FC 08 Villingen		
2014	Miami Dade FC	2	(1)
- * Club domestic league appearances and goals

Tiago Fernandes dos Santos e Sousa (born 20 November 1990), also known as Tiago Fernandes, is a Brazilian footballer who plays as a midfielder.

== Youth ==
Tiago Fernandes grow up in Belo Horizonte and was a promise star for the top rankings of Cruzeiro youth program before joining the Netherlands top team PSV Eindhoven in 2007.

== Career ==
On 27 November 2006, days after completing his 16th birthday, Tiago Fernandes signed his first professional contract with Cruzeiro. After spending the 2006 and 2007 season with Cruzeiro, Tiago Fernandes made a move to Europe and stayed one year and six months with PSV Eindhoven in the Netherlands.

In February 2008, under the command of Caco Espinoza Tiago played one season with Centro de Futebol Zico Sociedade Esportiva in Brazil.

In 2010 Tiago made a move back to Europe and signed for CD Alcoyano in the Spanish second division before transferring to Oberliga club FC 08 Villingen in 2012.

In December 2013 Tiago Fernandes trialled with San Fernando CD of the Segunda División B.

On 20 May 2014, Tiago Fernandes made a move to United States and was signed by the Miami Dade FC.

== Personal life ==
Tiago Fernandes was feature in the magazine Capricho in 2009.
