= Luise del Zopp =

German opera singer

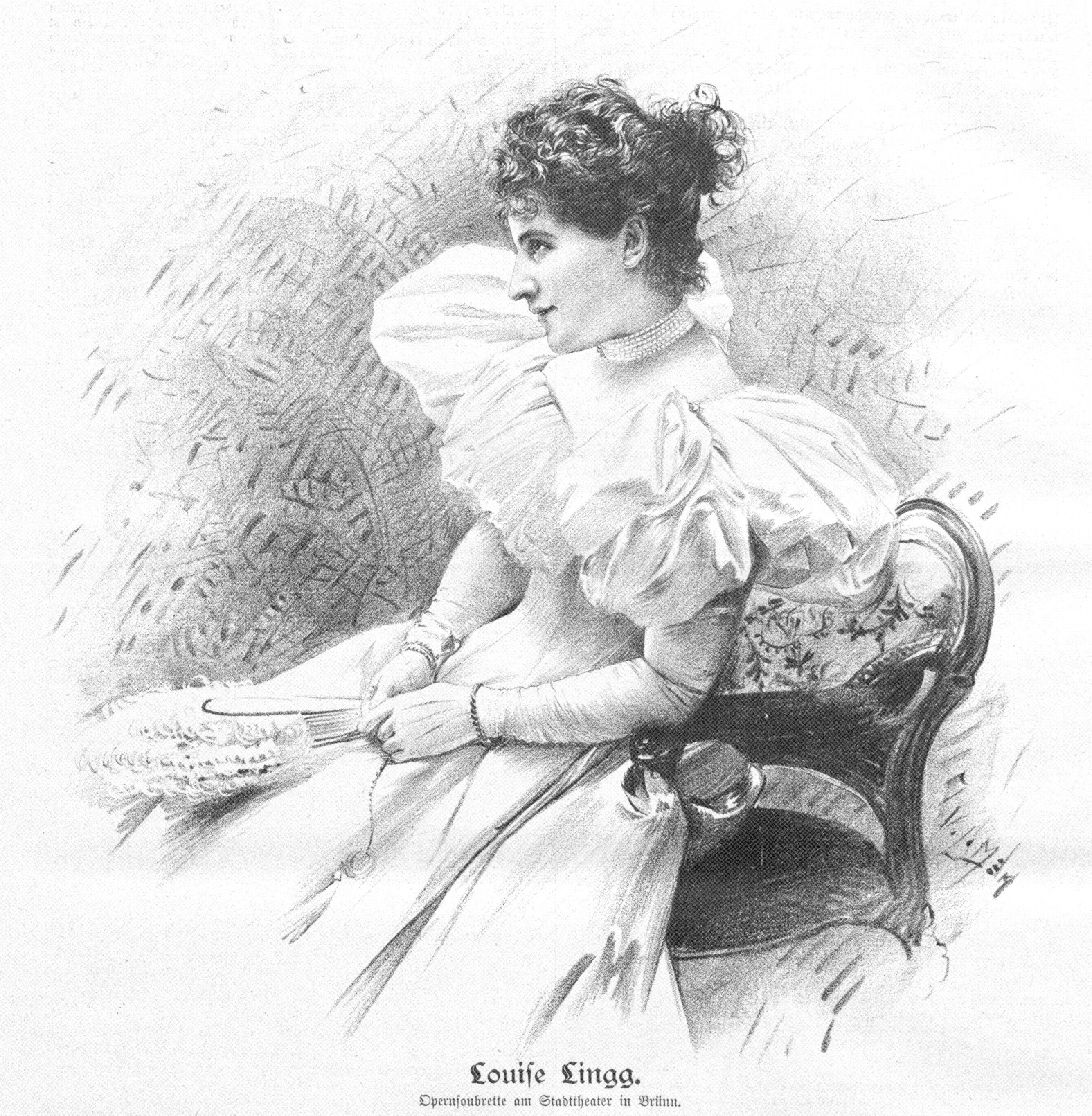
- Born: Aloisia Theresia Johanna Luksch; June 16, 1871
- Died: 1946 (aged 74–75)

Luise del Zopp, birth name Aloisia Theresia Johanna Luksch, also Louise Lingg, (1871 – after 1946) was a German actress, opera singer and screenwriter.

== Biography ==
Born on 16 June 1871 in Brünn (now Brno) in Austro-Hungarian Moravia, del Zopp first performed as a stage actress in her home town. Following appearances as an operetta singer in Munich and Vienna, she again appeared as a stage actress in Germany and Austria while also performing as an opera singer under the stage name Louise Lingg.

In 1909, she settled in Berlin where she first spent two years as an operetta singer. She then met the actor and film director Rudolf del Zopp (1861–1927) whom she married. He introduced her to Germany's top filmmakers of the times, including Oskar Messter and Adolf Gärtner. She wrote the screenplay for the silent film Adressantin verstorben (Sender Deceased, 1911) directed by Gärtner and featuring Henny Porten.

Luise del Zopp went on to write 41 screenplays including Ein Fehltritt: Die Tragödie einer Geächteten (Misstep: A Tragedy of a Female Criminal, 1911), Sklave der Liebe (A Slave of Love, 1912), Die Hochzeit von Valeni (Valeni's Wedding, 1912), and Das Kriegslied der Rheinarmee (The War Hymn of the Rhine Army, 1914). She also acted in Ein Schwur (1913) and Er soll dein Herr sein oder - In der eigenen Schlinge gefangen (1915).

After her husband died in 1926, the director and critic Gerhard Lamprecht continued to support her but little is known of her later life.

== Filmography ==
- Friedel, der Geiger (1910/1911) (screenwriter)
- Der vergrabene Schatz (1910/1911) (screenwriter)
- Die schlechte Zensur (1911) (screenwriter)
- Ein Fehltritt: Die Tragödie einer Geächteten (1911) (screenwriter)
- Ein Spiel um das Lebensglück zweier Menschen (1911) (screenwriter)
- Die Großstadt bei Nacht, wie sie weint und lacht (1911) (screenwriter)
- Sklave der Liebe (1911) (screenwriter)
- Briefkasten an den lieben Gott (1911) (screenwriter)
- Frau Rechtsanwalts erster Erfolg (1911) (screenwriter)
- Im Glück vergessen (1911) (screenwriter and camera)
- Die Wallfahrt nach Kevlaar (1911) (screenwriter)
- Zur rechten Zeit (1911) (screenwriter)
- Tragödie eines Verräters (1911) (screenwriter)
- Nur einen Helden will sie lieben! (1911) (screenwriter)
- Geächtet (1911/1912) (screenwriter)
- Ein Leben (1911/1912) (screenwriter)
- Heimat (1911/1912) (screenwriter)
- Mamas Schutzengel (1911/1912) (screenwriter)
- Adressatin verstorben (1911/1912) (screenwriter)
- Um fremde Schuld. Eine Episode aus dem Leben (1912) (screenwriter)
- Ein Blick in den Abgrund (1912) (screenwriter)
- Mimosa-san (1912) (screenwriter)
- Der weiße Schleier (1912 ) (screenwriter)
- Die Stradivarius-Geige (1912) (screenwriter)
- Freiheit oder Tod (1912) (screenwriter) (crime film starring Wanda Treumann)
- Die Hochzeit von Valeni (1912) (screenwriter)
- Quälendes Dasein (1912) (screenwriter)
- Komtesse Seerose (1912) (screenwriter)
- Isaak, der Handelsjude (1912) (screenwriter)
- Es muß ein Schauspieler sein (1912) (screenwriter)
- Ein Schwur (1912/1913) (screenwriter and actress)
- Das Kriegslied der Rheinarmee (1913) (screenwriter)
- Motiv unbekannt. Das Drama einer Ehe (1913) (screenwriter)
- Wir lassen uns scheiden (1913) (screenwriter)
- Der Zirkusteufel (1913) (screenwriter)
- Erblich belastet? (1913) (screenwriter) (western/crime film starring Aud-Egede Nissen)
- Elle und Schwert (1914) (screenwriter)
- Eine Liebesgabe (1914/1915) (screenwriter)
- Die Austernperle (1915) (screenwriter)
- Er soll dein Herr sein (In der eigenen Schlinge gefangen) (1915) (screenwriter and actress)
- Das Rätsel von Sensenheim (1915) (screenwriter)
