= Roberto Linck =

Brazilian/American footballer and filmmaker

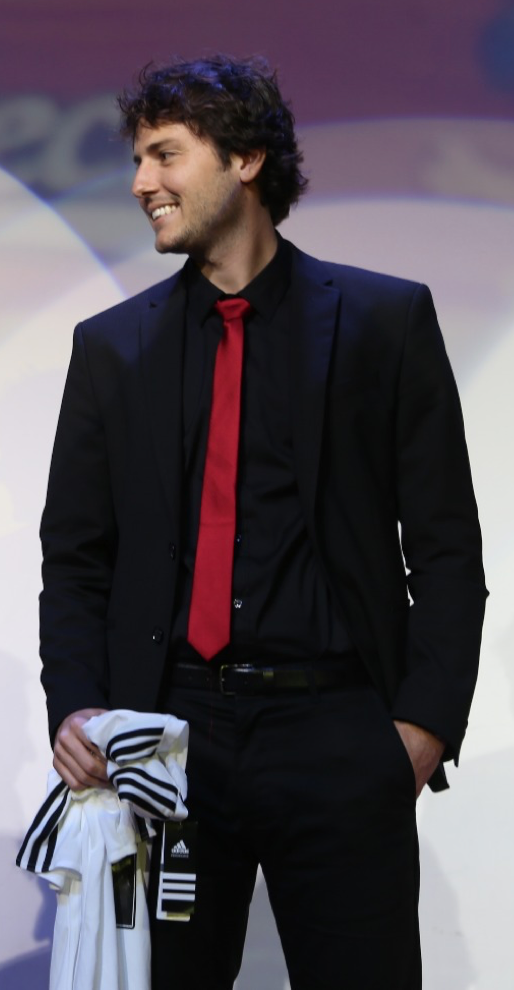
- Born: 31 July 1988 (age 38); Cachoeira do Sul, Rio Grande do Sul, Brazil
- Occupations: Footballer; Film producer; spokesperson
- Height: 6 ft 1 in (1.85 m)
Association football career
- Position: Striker
Youth career
- Gremio
College career
Years	Team	Apps	(Gls)
- Irvine Valley College
Senior career*
Years	Team	Apps	(Gls)
2009	Chicago Storm	5	(3)
2010	CSM Ramnicu Valcea	12	(3)
2010–2011	New England Revolution	6	(0)
2014–2024	Miami Dade FC	31	(18)
Total		54	(24)
Managerial career
- 2024–2026: Miami Dade FC (President)
- * Club domestic league appearances and goals

Roberto Moreira Linck Junior (born 31 July 1988 in Cachoeira do Sul), nicknamed Betu, is a Brazilian-American former professional footballer and film producer. He co-owns Miami Dade FC and Low Spark Films, and was an executive producer of the 2026 horror film Buddy.

== Youth and college ==
Linck played in the youth development system of Grêmio in Brazil before moving to the United States in 2002. He later played for Park City High School in Utah, where he won the Utah 3A state championship in 2006, and was selected for the Olympic Development Program. Linck subsequently played college soccer at Irvine Valley College.

== Career ==
=== Soccer ===
Linck began his professional career in indoor soccer with the Chicago Storm of the Xtreme Soccer League.

In January 2010, Linck had a trial with Romanian club Steaua București, he participated in their preseason. He subsequently joined CSM Râmnicu Vâlcea, scoring with a header on his debut for the Romanian club.

On 30 July 2010, one day before his 22nd birthday, Linck signed with the New England Revolution of Major League Soccer. He made his MLS debut on 8 August 2010, coming on as a substitute for Khano Smith in the 80th minute of a 1–0 victory over D.C. United.

Linck was also part of the Revolution squad that reached the 2010 SuperLiga Final. New England became the first club in the tournament's history to win all three group-stage matches and the first to complete the group stage without conceding a goal. Linck appeared as a second-half substitute in the final against Monarcas Morelia, entering in the 70th minute and playing the final 20 minutes on the right wing. The championship match was contested for a $1 million winner's prize, with New England finishing as tournament runner-up following a 2–1 defeat.

Later in the season, Linck suffered a strained right adductor, an injury that contributed to an extended absence from professional soccer. He was released by New England on 28 February 2011. Linck remained away from professional soccer until returning in 2014.

On 20 May 2014, Linck returned to professional soccer and signed with Miami Dade FC as a striker. He scored in his debut for the club, finding the net in the 83rd minute.

=== Business career ===
In 2014, Linck established the Miami-based talent management agency Conttratta, which represented artists and sports figures. Its clients included Claudia Alende, Laura Rizzotto, Edgaras Jankauskas and former Brazil international Emerson Ferreira da Rosa.

That same year, Linck founded Miami Dade FC in Miami, Florida. The club won the NAL championship in its inaugural year and subsequently expanded its international activities, including two matches against Brazilian club Cruzeiro, which was the reigning Brazilian champion at the time. The club also participated in an international event in Barranquilla, Colombia, where it received recognition from the United Nations.

In 2015, Linck worked with former Brazil and Real Madrid player Roberto Carlos to develop Ginga Scout, a soccer technology platform designed to connect players with coaches and scouts internationally.

=== Film and TV ===
Linck was featured in episode 126 of the television program FIFA Football, alongside former professional footballers Louis Saha and Emerson Ferreira da Rosa.

Linck later directed the television series Camino Al Gol, in which soccer scouts traveled throughout Colombia to select one player from approximately 5,000 trialists.

In 2025, Linck executive produced the horror film Buddy. Directed by Casper Kelly, the film stars Cristin Milioti, Delaney Quinn, Topher Grace, Keegan-Michael Key, Michael Shannon, and Patton Oswalt. It premiered in the Midnight section of the 2026 Sundance Film Festival and later screened in the Festival Favorites section at South by Southwest.

The film was theatrically released in North America on August 28, 2026, opening in 1,258 theaters and grossing approximately $5.4 million during its opening weekend. By October 2026, the film had grossed more than $26.8 million at the North American box office. In October 2026, an interactive sing-along edition, titled Buddy: The Sing-Along Version, was released in more than 500 theaters across the United States.

In October 2026, Sony Pictures Worldwide Acquisitions beat out several companies to acquire international distribution rights to the film in a deal reported to be in the "high seven figures".

=== Video games ===
Linck appeared as a New England Revolution player in EA Sports' FIFA 11. He was also included in Football Manager 2011.

In 2026, Linck's film project Buddy was adapted into Buddy: The Video Game, a retro survival horror game developed by playinstinct and published by ModRetro.

== Charitable work ==
In 2014, Linck helped establish Soccer Mission, a charitable initiative involving members of Miami Dade FC. Its first project took place around Thanksgiving, when players and staff prepared meals in Fort Lauderdale that were donated to more than 150 people experiencing homelessness.

In July 2015, Miami Dade FC participated in Respira Paz, a United Nations peace initiative in Barranquilla, Colombia. The initiative included an international football match at Estadio Metropolitano, and Miami Dade FC received recognition in connection with the campaign.

Linck has also served on the board of directors of Friends of Soccer Dreamers Brazil, a nonprofit organization supporting youth through soccer and education in Brazil.

== Personal life ==
Linck has an unusual background for a MLS player having trained through the youth system of Brazil's Gremio Football Porto Alegrense which schooled Ronaldinho, and then playing college soccer in California, professional indoor soccer for the Chicago Storm, and a season with CSM Ramnicu Valcea in Romania.

Linck's great-grandfather Aurélio de Lima Py, was the founder and the first president of the Federação Gaúcha de Futebol, who also was the first Patron and served nine terms as president of Grêmio.

== Filmography ==
Year	Title	Director	Writer	Producer	Appearance	Notes	Box office
2017	Lock All Doors	Yes	Yes	Yes	No	Short Film	—
2017	I'm Good at Being Bad	No	Yes	Yes	Yes	Music Video	—
2017	FIFA Football	No	No	No	Yes	Episode 126 / As Himself	—
2019	Blue Springs	Yes	Yes	Yes	No	Short Film	—
2020	Camino Al Gol	Yes	Yes	No	Yes	TV series	—
2023	Unfelt	No	No	No	Yes	Cameo as Doctor	—
2026	Buddy	No	No	Yes	No	Executive producer	$27 million
TBA	Summer of Roses	No	No	Yes	No	Executive producer	TBA

== Film Awards and nominations ==
Year	Association	Category	Work	Result
2026	SXSW Film & TV Festival	Audience Award – Festival Favorites	Buddy	Nominated
2026	Sitges – Catalonian International Film Festival	Official Fantastic Competition – Best Screenplay	Buddy	Won

== Honours ==
=== Individual ===
Recognition of Distinguished Visitor of the city of Miami (November 12, 2022) by Mayor Daniella Levine Cava.

=== Chicago Storm ===
USL Champion 2009

=== New England Revolution ===
North American SuperLiga Runners-up (2nd Place) 2010

=== Miami Dade FC ===
NAL – Champion (2014)

United Nations Award – UNODC Respira Paz (2015)

APSL – Regular Season Champion (2016)

APSL – Regular Season Champion (2017)

APSL – APSL Champion (2017)

Svema Karlstad Trophy Sweden – Runners-up (2nd Place) (2019)

Top Tour Mexico - Champion (2021)

National Soccer League - Champions (2022)

=== I'm Good at Being Bad (Music Video) ===
Special Mention Award at the Asia South East-Short Film Festival (2018)
