= St. Francis Schools (Alpharetta, Georgia) =

Private school in Milton, Georgia, United States

Coordinates: 34°6′26.0″N 84°16′52.2″W

Saint Francis School

Location
- 13440 Cogburn Rd. Milton, Georgia; United States

Information
- Type: Private, day, college preparatory
- Religious affiliation: Nonsectarian
- Established: 1976
- Principal: Karen Harrison (Elementary School); Kathleen Hasling (Middle School); Brad Etter (High School)
- Grades: K–12
- Gender: Co-educational
- Campuses: Milton and Roswell
- Campus type: Suburban
- Colors: Navy, white, & silver
- Athletics: Georgia High School Association 1A
- Team name: Knights
- Accreditation: Georgia Accrediting Commission, Southern Association of Independent Schools
- Tuition: $18,000–$29,800 (2025-26)
- Website: saintfrancisschools.com

Saint Francis School is a K–12 private, nonsectarian, college preparatory school located in Milton, Georgia, United States. Saint Francis has been serving students of the Metro Atlanta area since 1976. Saint Francis School is accredited by the Georgia Accrediting Commission (GAC), the Southern Association of Independent Schools (SAIS), and the Southern Association of Colleges and Schools (SACS). It is a member of Georgia Independent School Association (GISA) and the Atlanta Area Association of Independent Schools (AAAIS).

== Campuses ==
Kindergarten through 8th grades are located on a 24-acre campus on Willeo Road in Roswell, Georgia, United States. The campus has three large classroom buildings, a spacious cafeteria, two gymnasiums, a football/soccer field, a baseball/softball field, tennis courts, several playgrounds and an indoor swimming pool. The Roswell (main campus) serves approximately 500 students.

Saint Francis High School is located on a 47-acre campus on Cogburn Road in Milton, Georgia (approximately 15 miles from the main campus). The campus includes a classroom building, media and arts building, auditorium (theatre) building, football stadium, baseball and softball fields, tennis courts, cafeteria and weight room facility.

== Academics ==
Curriculum offerings include AP, honors, traditional, support and academic enhancement classes. Saint Francis School is a Google School with all students, grades 6–12, using a laptop or tablet in their classrooms. Curriculum and instruction are presented in a variety of formats that address student needs and prepare them for a variety of college situations.

== Athletics ==
Sports are offered both at the middle school and high school including football, basketball, soccer, baseball, track, swimming, wrestling, softball, volleyball, equestrian, cheerleading and tennis. High school teams participate in the Georgia High School Association Georgia High School Association (GHSA), Single A divisions.

== Schools ==
=== Saint Francis Elementary School ===
Saint Francis Elementary School includes K–5th grade. Programs include Orton-Gillingham based Fundations; Wilson reading system; Literature Appreciation; computer-assisted programs such as Read, Write and Gold; and a developmental math program emphasizing memory, process, mental representations, and concepts. Students also receive instruction in science and social studies through hands-on activities, research, and cross-curricular activities. All students participate in a mandatory homework hour at the end of the school day, allowing teachers to assist them as they practice the skills taught during the day.

The curriculum is presented in a multi-modal format that is cognizant that different students learn in different ways. A parallel curriculum emphasizes appropriate study skills, note-taking skills, Cornell Notes, memorization skills, and time-management skills where school work is broken down into manageable segments of days, weeks, quarters, and semesters.

=== Saint Francis Middle School ===
Saint Francis Middle School includes grades 6–8. Programs include Literature Appreciation; Orton-Gillingham based Wilson reading system; CARS and STARS, a systematic approach to reading comprehension; and computer-assisted reading and writing programs such as Read, Write and Gold. There is also Spanish for certain eighth grade students. The math curriculum is designed to address the specific needs of the student. A variety of courses are available, with students receiving additional math assistance in Math Lab. Students also receive instruction and skill development in science and social studies through a study-skills approach, hands-on activities, research and cross-curricular writing and reading activities.

All students participate in a mandatory homework hour at the end of the school day, allowing teachers to assist them as they practice the skills taught during the day. Students receive and present work in a variety of formats using their digital devices. New technologies enhance curriculum instruction and provide students with electronic textbooks, Google Apps, and other collaborative networking opportunities. Teachers are able to monitor process and give immediate feedback through Google School Suite, which provides communication and collaboration tools.

Sports offered include football, basketball, soccer, baseball, track and field, swimming, wrestling, softball, volleyball, equestrian, cheerleading, and tennis.

=== Saint Francis High School ===
Saint Francis High School includes grades 9–12. Students receive and present work in a variety of formats using their digital devices. New technologies enhance curriculum instruction and provide students with electronic textbooks, Google Apps, and other collaborative networking opportunities. Teachers are able to monitor process and give immediate feedback through Google School Suite, which provides communication and collaboration tools.

Sports offered include football, basketball, soccer, baseball, track and field, swimming, wrestling, softball, volleyball, equestrian, cheerleading, and tennis. High school sports teams participate in the Georgia High School Association Georgia High School Association (GHSA), Single A divisions.

== Notable alumni ==
- James Banks III (born 1998) - basketball player in the Israeli Basketball Premier League
- Malik Beasley – NBA player
- Kaiser Gates (born 1996) – basketball player for Hapoel Jerusalem of the Israeli Basketball Premier League
- Gia Pergolini - Paralympic gold medalist and world record holder
- Kobi Simmons (born 1997) - basketball player, former NBA, now for Maccabi Tel Aviv of the Israeli Basketball Premier League
