= National Adult League =

National Adult Leagues
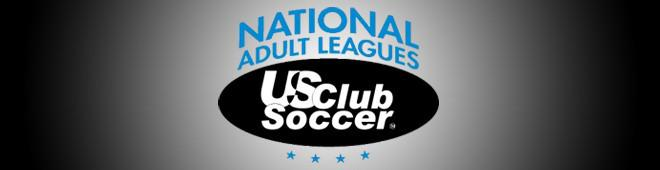
- Founded: 2012
- Folded: 2014
- Country: United States; Puerto Rico
- Confederation: CONCACAF
- Divisions: 1
- Number of clubs: 5
- Promotion to: None
- Relegation to: None
- Domestic cup: Lamar Hunt U.S. Open Cup
- Last champions: Miami Dade FC (2014)
- Current: 2014 NAL season

The National Adult League (NAL) was an American amateur soccer league.

The league was officially affiliated with the US Club Soccer (US Club Soccer).

== Competition format ==
The National Adult Leagues was divided into conferences (Northeast, South, Midwest and West). Each Region contained between three or four conferences with varying number of teams per conference. The four regions generally corresponded with the four US Soccer association, Northeast (Region I), Midwest (Region II), South (Region III) and West (Region IV). The regular season ran from May through July. Most conferences played between ten and twelve games against teams within the conference. When possible, each conference followed a double round robin format allowing for a balanced schedule. However, larger conferences had unbalanced schedules, given the constraints around scheduling games within its short window. The schedule was designed to allow college students to compete during their summer break. For the playoffs, the formats varied by region and conference with the four region champions facing each other in the National Semifinals and Championship games.

== Organization ==
The NAL was organized in a mostly decentralized structure and was managed as a team-run league. Each year, the member clubs helped elect a Commissioner, Treasurer and Secretary and a Board of Directors. Each team was individually owned and operated, and was responsible for maintaining league minimum standards. New teams seeking membership into the NAL were subject to approval from an executive committee of existing team owners. Member clubs had the right to make localized decisions for their respective markets, conferences and regions based on what they believed was best for their particular region.

The final Commissioner was Mark Shearer. Each conference was managed by the individual member clubs and elected a conference commission each year.

== Teams ==
Team	City	Stadium	Founded	First season	Head coach
Florida Region
South Florida Conference
A.C. Brickell	Miami, FL	Tropical Park	2014	2014	(Italy) Simone Ghirlanda
Miami Dade FC	Miami, FL	St. Thomas University (Florida)	2014	2014	(Brazil) Joao Garcia
Miami Nacional S.C.	Miami, FL			2014	
Santos USA	Miami, FL	North Miami Athletic Stadium		2014	(Brazil) Robson Manente
South Florida FC	Pembroke Pines, FL	Broward College		2014	

== See also ==
- Major League Soccer
- North American Soccer League
- USL Pro
- USL Premier Development League
