= Emerson (footballer, born 1976) =

Brazilian footballer

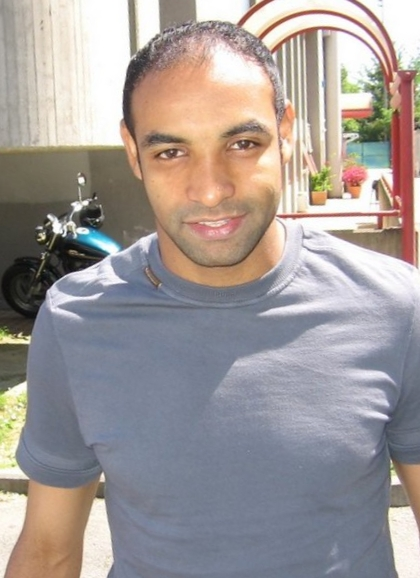
- Emerson in 2005

Personal information
- Full name: Emerson Ferreira da Rosa
- Date of birth: 4 April 1976 (age 50)
- Place of birth: Pelotas, Rio Grande do Sul, Brazil
- Height: 1.84 m (6 ft 0 in)
- Position: Defensive midfielder

Youth career
- 1992–1993: Grêmio

Senior career*
Years	Team	Apps	(Gls)
1994–1997	Grêmio	54	(8)
1997–2000	Bayer Leverkusen	82	(11)
2000–2004	Roma	105	(13)
2004–2006	Juventus	67	(4)
2006–2007	Real Madrid	28	(1)
2007–2009	AC Milan	27	(0)
2009	Santos	6	(0)
2015–2020	Miami Dade FC	17	(4)
Total		379	(41)

International career
1997–2006	Brazil	73	(6)
Medal record
Men's football
Representing Brazil
Copa América
Winner	1999 Paraguay
FIFA Confederations Cup
Winner	2005 Germany
Runner-up	1999 Mexico
FIFA World Cup
Runner-up	1998 France
- * Club domestic league appearances and goals

Emerson Ferreira da Rosa (born 4 April 1976), simply known as Emerson, is a Brazilian former professional footballer who played as a defensive midfielder. At international level, he played 73 games for the Brazil national team between 1997 and 2006, scoring 6 goals. With Brazil, he has taken part in two FIFA World Cups (1998, 2006, missing out on the 2002 FIFA World Cup due to injury), two editions of the Copa América (1999, 2001), and three Confederations Cups (1999, 2003, 2005), winning the 1999 Copa América and the 2005 FIFA Confederations Cup, while also reaching the 1998 World Cup Final.

An experienced footballer who was nicknamed the Puma due to his powerful but elegant, ball-winning style of play, Emerson played for two Brazilian clubs, Grêmio and Santos, as well as several European clubs in Germany, Italy, and Spain, including Bayer Leverkusen, Roma, Juventus, Real Madrid and AC Milan, winning several titles. In addition to his Brazilian passport, Emerson also holds Italian and German passports.

== Club career ==
=== Grêmio ===
Emerson made a name for himself in his native Brazil playing for Grêmio, where he won two state championships, two Brazilian Cups, one Brazilian Championship and one Copa Libertadores. He was an unused substitute at the Intercontinental Cup of 1995 which was lost against Ajax Amsterdam on penalties. In 1997 he went to Europe to play for German club Bayer Leverkusen.

=== Bayer Leverkusen ===
In 1997, Emerson was transferred to Bayer Leverkusen. He made his debut on 1 August 1997 against Schalke 04. Leverkusen finished in third place in the 1997–98 Bundesliga season. This was followed by two consecutive second-place finishes in the Bundesliga, behind champions Bayern Munich on both occasions. Emerson spent three years at Leverkusen, scoring 11 goals in 82 league appearances. On 13 August 1997, he made his debut in UEFA competitions in the qualifying round for the 1997–98 UEFA Champions League, in Bayer Leverkusen's 6–1 aggregate win over Dinamo Tbilisi. Leverkusen would eventually reach the Champions League quarter-finals, losing out to eventual champions Real Madrid. Emerson also reached the UEFA Cup round of 16 on two occasions with Leverkusen.

=== Roma ===
Emerson signed for Italian Serie A club Roma in the summer of 2000 for 35 billion Italian lire (€18.1 million by fixed exchange rate). He signed a five-year contract with an average salary of 7.2 billion Italian lire per year before tax. However, due to the quota imposed on non-EU players, Emerson was unable to play until Emerson acquired Italian nationality in October 2000, as his wife is Italian–Brazilian. Emerson made his Serie A debut in a 3–0 victory on 28 January 2001 against Napoli, replacing Marco Delvecchio in the 56th minute. Roma eventually won the Scudetto and the Supercoppa Italiana in 2001. Roma would also reach the Coppa Italia final during the 2002–03 season, losing out to Milan.

=== Juventus ===
After a prolonged transfer saga in which Roma wanted to sell Emerson to Real Madrid instead of Serie A rivals Juventus, Emerson was eventually sold to Juventus (which he preferred) in 2004 for €12 million plus Matteo Brighi (who was valued at €16 million), following in the footsteps of his former club coach, Fabio Capello. Moreover, an additional €4 million was paid to the agents, which made Emerson cost €32 million in total. Emerson won two consecutive Serie A titles with Juventus during the 2004–05 and the 2005–06 seasons, but both titles were revoked following the club's involvement in the 2006 Italian football scandal.

=== Real Madrid ===
After two seasons with Juventus, and following their relegation to Serie B due to their role in the 2006 Italian football scandal, Emerson moved to Real Madrid on 19 July 2006, again following Fabio Capello, costing Real Madrid €16 million. However, due to the declining relationship between Emerson and Capello and Emerson's poor performances for Real Madrid, in January 2007 Emerson stated his desire to return to Juventus, while it was rumoured he would be willing to take a pay cut.

However, by May, Emerson's performances had improved considerably, along with a great improvement in the team's results, and on 12 May 2007 he declared his intention to remain with Real Madrid. But in his conversation with the radio program El Larguero, Real Madrid club president Ramón Calderón said Emerson would leave Real Madrid in the summer (along with the Italian striker Antonio Cassano) for technical reasons. Emerson won La Liga in his only season with Real Madrid.

=== AC Milan ===
On 21 August 2007, AC Milan officially confirmed the transfer of Emerson for €6 million. He made his Milan debut in the club's 3–1 UEFA Super Cup victory over Sevilla on 31 August. However, Emerson was unable to contribute significantly to his new club due to injury, only managing 20 appearances for Milan in the 2007–08 season. Nonetheless, he was also able to win the 2007 FIFA Club World Cup with Milan. On 21 April 2009, he and the club mutually agreed to terminate his contract.

Immediately following his release, Emerson began negotiations with Grêmio with the aim of ending his career with his first club. However, due to international transfer restrictions, Emerson was unable to join Grêmio until August 2009 at the earliest.

=== Santos ===
After his release from Milan, on 26 July 2009 Emerson signed a contract with Santos. On 16 October 2009, Emerson decided to terminate his contract and leave Santos due to injury problems. Emerson then underwent surgery and retired from active competition.

=== Miami Dade FC ===
On 3 November 2015, Emerson announced he was joining Miami Dade FC of the American Premier Soccer League (APSL). On 7 May 2017, Emerson made his debut for Miami Dade alongside former Brazil national team player Gabriel in a 3–1 victory against Jupiter United. On 2 July, he won the 2017 Regular Season Championship, undefeated.

== International career ==
Emerson made his Brazil debut on 10 September 1997, in a home friendly match against Ecuador, in Salvador, Bahia, also scoring a goal in the match, as Brazil went on to win 4–2. He was a late replacement for Romário at the 1998 FIFA World Cup following Romário's injury. The defending World Cup champions Brazil reached the final, losing 3–0 to hosts and eventual champions France. (Four years later, it would be Emerson who would miss out on a spot at the 2002 World Cup due to injury.)

The following year, Emerson won the 1999 Copa América with Brazil, as Brazil overcame Uruguay in the final. Emerson scored one goal during the tournament, in Brazil's 7–0 win in its opening group match against Venezuela. Brazil also reached the final of the 1999 FIFA Confederations Cup that year, where they lost the trophy to hosts Mexico in the final. Emerson scored his second international goal on 31 March 1999, in a friendly match against Japan in Tokyo, which Brazil won 2–0. Emerson scored his first double for Brazil on 23 February 2000 in a friendly match in Bangkok against Thailand, which Brazil won 7–0.

Emerson was intended to be the original captain for Brazil's 2002 World Cup team, but he suffered an unfortunate injury in training before the first match of the tournament, dislocating his shoulder when attempting to parry a shot by a teammate. He was replaced by Ricardinho of Corinthians, while Cafu replaced him as captain. Brazil would ultimately win the tournament.

In 2005, Emerson won the 2005 Confederations Cup with Brazil, who defeated South American rivals Argentina 4–1 in the final, as well as overcoming hosts Germany 3–2 in the semi-finals. On 30 March 2005, Emerson scored a goal in an away 1–1 draw against Uruguay in a 2006 World Cup qualifying match. In the 2006 World Cup, he played in three of Brazil's five matches at the tournament, appearing in Brazil's two opening wins over Croatia and Australia during the group stage, while he was rested in the final group match against Japan, which Brazil won 4–1. He also appeared in Brazil's 3–0 round of 16 victory over Ghana, although he was taken off in the 46th minute after sustaining an injury. This would be Emerson's final match for Brazil. Brazil were eventually knocked out in the quarter-finals by eventual finalists France. Emerson was excluded from the starting line-up in Brazil's quarter-final match due to injury.

After the 2006 World Cup, Emerson retired from the national team, having scored 6 goals in 73 appearances. In addition to the aforementioned tournaments, Emerson also represented Brazil in the 2001 Copa América, in Colombia, where Brazil lost in the quarter-finals to Honduras; and in the 2003 Confederations Cup in France, where Brazil was surprisingly eliminated in the first round, finishing third in their group.

== Playing style ==
Emerson was an experienced, quick, combative, hardworking and dynamic player, who was capable of being deployed in several midfield positions. He played as a central midfielder, and as a box-to-box midfielder on occasion, although his main position was that of a defensive midfielder, who was renowned for breaking down the opposition's play through his efficient tackling, stamina, anticipation, and ability to read the game. He was also capable of subsequently starting up attacking plays once he won back possession, due to his quick and effective passing style, as well as his technique. These attributes led to his nickname Il Puma for his elegant, yet powerful, feline movements when chasing down opponents in midfield. He was also gifted with a powerful and accurate shot from distance, although he was also known to be injury prone.

== Career statistics ==
=== Club ===
Appearances and goals by club, season and competition
Club	Season	League			Cup		Continental		Other		Total	
Club	Season	Division	Apps	Goals	Apps	Goals	Apps	Goals	Apps	Goals	Apps	Goals
Grêmio	1994	Série A	18	2	6	0	4	0			28	2
Grêmio	1995	Série A	11	1	1	0	2	0			14	1
Grêmio	1996	Série A	25	5	5	0	4	0	1	0	35	5
Grêmio	1997	Série A	0	0	7	0	7	2			14	2
Grêmio	Total		54	8	19	0	17	2	1 (Note: Includes State League, 1995 Intercontinental Cup and 1996 Recopa Sudamericana (one match))	0	91	10
Bayer Leverkusen	1997–98	Bundesliga	25	1	3	0	9	4	1 (Note: Appearance in DFB-Ligapokal)	0	38	5
Bayer Leverkusen	1998–99	Bundesliga	28	5	1	0	3	0	1	0	33	5
Bayer Leverkusen	1999–2000	Bundesliga	29	5	0	0	8	0	0	0	37	5
Bayer Leverkusen	Total		82	11	4	0	20	4	2	0	108	15
Roma	2000–01	Serie A	13	3	0	0	1	0	–		14	3
Roma	2001–02	Serie A	28	5	2	0	11	2	0	0	41	7
Roma	2002–03	Serie A	31	2	6	3	11	1	–		48	6
Roma	2003–04	Serie A	33	3	1	0	8	2	–		42	5
Roma	Total		105	13	9	3	31	5	0	0	145	21
Juventus	2004–05	Serie A	33	2	0	0	11	1	–		44	3
Juventus	2005–06	Serie A	34	2	3	0	9	1	1 (Note: Appearance Supercoppa)	0	47	3
Juventus	Total		67	4	3	0	20	2	1	0	91	6
Real Madrid	2006–07	La Liga	28	1	0	0	6	0	–		34	1
AC Milan	2007–08	Serie A	15	0	2	0	3	0	2 (Note: One appearance 2007 UEFA Super Cup, one appearance in 2007 FIFA Club World Cup)	0	22	0
AC Milan	2008–09	Serie A	12	0	1	0	5	0	–		18	0
AC Milan	Total		27	0	3	0	8	0	2	0	40	0
Santos	2009	Série A	6	0	–		–		0	0	6	0
Career total			369	37	38	3	102	13	4	0	513	53

=== International ===
Appearances and goals by national team and year
National team	Year	Apps	Goals
Brazil	1997	3	1
Brazil	1998	2	0
Brazil	1999	17	2
Brazil	2000	8	2
Brazil	2001	11	0
Brazil	2002	4	0
Brazil	2003	10	0
Brazil	2004	0	0
Brazil	2005	13	1
Brazil	2006	5	0
Total		73	6

Scores and results list Brazil's goal tally first, score column indicates score after each Emerson goal.

List of international goals scored by Emerson
No.	Date	Venue	Opponent	Score	Result	Competition
1	10 September 1997	Estádio Fonte Nova, Salvador, Brazil	Ecuador	4–1	4–2	Friendly
2	31 March 1999	National Olympic Stadium, Tokyo, Japan	Japan	2–0	2–0	Friendly
3	30 June 1999	Estadio Antonio Oddone Sarubbi, Ciudad del Este, Paraguay	Venezuela	2–0	7–0	1999 Copa América
4	23 February 2000	Rajamangala Stadium, Bangkok, Thailand	Thailand	4–0	7–0	2000 King's Cup
5	23 February 2000	Rajamangala Stadium, Bangkok, Thailand	Thailand	7–0	7–0	2000 King's Cup
6	30 March 2005	Estadio Centenario, Montevideo, Uruguay	Uruguay	1–1	1–1	2006 World Cup qualification

== Honours ==
=== Club ===
Grêmio

- Campeonato Brasileiro Série A: 1996
- Copa do Brasil: 1994, 1997
- Copa Libertadores: 1995
- Recopa Sudamericana: 1996

Roma

- Serie A: 2000–01
- Supercoppa Italiana: 2001

Real Madrid

- La Liga: 2006–07

AC Milan

- UEFA Super Cup: 2007
- FIFA Club World Cup: 2007

Miami Dade FC

- APSL Regular Season: 2016
- APSL Regular Season: 2017
- APSL Champions: 2017

=== International ===
Brazil

- Copa América: 1999
- FIFA Confederations Cup: 2005; runner-up: 1999
- FIFA World Cup runner-up: 1998

=== Individual ===
- kicker Bundesliga Team of the Season: 1999–2000
