= Miami Dade FC =

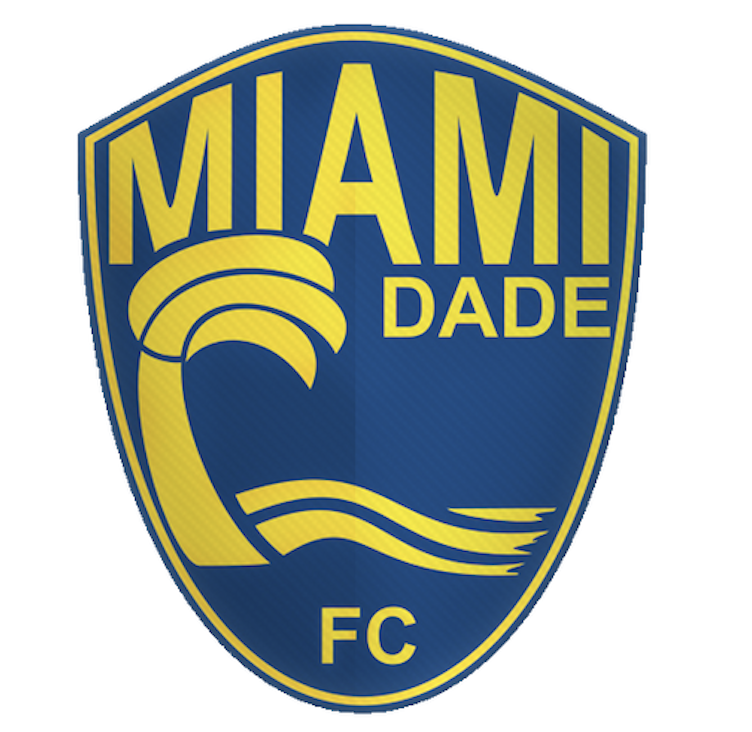
- Full name: Miami Dade Football Club
- Nickname: Miami
- Founded: May 20, 2014; 12 years ago
- Owner: Palm Lake Entertainment Group
- President: Victor Hensel
- Head Coach: Marko Perović
- League: United Premier Soccer League
- Website: www.miamidadefc.com
Home colors	Away colors

Miami Dade FC is an American soccer team based in Miami, Florida. The club was founded in 2014 and is currently competing in United Premier Soccer League. In November 2015, the club made international headlines by announcing that former Brazil national football team captain Emerson Ferreira da Rosa was joining the club.

== History ==
=== 2014: Founding ===
Miami Dade FC was founded on May 1, 2014, by Roberto Linck. The club was established following the acquisition of franchise rights to compete in the NAL by Linck Group, an investment company associated with Linck. The acquisition marked the formal establishment of Miami Dade FC and the beginning of the club's competitive operations.

Miami Dade Football Club, LLC was registered with the Florida State Department by Roberto Linck on May 1, 2014, and on May 20 the team was officially announced as the 5th NAL Florida conference franchise.

Ginga Scout was announced to be MDFC inaugural jersey sponsor in an event at 1826 Lounge in Miami Beach on May 20, 2014, at the same event which revealed the club's first ever jersey design.

Miami Dade FC debuted in the NAL on May 30, 2014, in a match against Nacional SC, winning the match 3 to 1. Players Andres Perez and Kaique Negri scored the club's first winning goals.

On July 26, Miami Dade FC was crowned NAL champions after defeating Santos USA.

=== 2015-2016: New league ===
On March 12, Miami Dade FC announces that they will be part of the new league APSL, starting in April, 2015.

Miami Dade FC were defeated in the semi-finals against Boca Raton FC therefore being eliminated, and ending their inaugural season in the APSL.

In May 2016, Miami Dade FC played its first match against a National Team. The game was a Copa America 2016 preparation match against Haiti national football team at the IMG Academy in Bradenton, FL. The game ended 4x1 for Haiti national football team.

The Miami Dade FC found immediate success in the APSL, winning the 2016 Regular Season Championship with a 5–2–0 (Win-Draw-Loss) record.

=== 2017: Champions ===
With former Brazil national football team players Emerson Ferreira da Rosa and Gabriel Rodrigues dos Santos, Miami Dade FC won the 2017 Regular Season Championship undefeated.

=== 2018 to 2020 ===
In 2018, Miami Dade FC joined the United Premier Soccer League. During their first season, the club managed to qualify to the playoffs but failed to advance to the final. In 2019 Miami Dade FC failed to qualify to the playoffs, finishing 10th in the standings.

Miami Dade FC participated of the 2018 Campeonato Carioca of Beach Soccer. The tournament was founded in 1906, and feature traditional Brazilian teams such as Flamengo and Vasco da Gama. Miami Dade FC finish 3rd in their group, and did not qualify for the finals.

On July 29, 2019, Miami Dade FC took 2nd place at the Svema Karlstad Trophy in Sweden, after losing against FBK Karlstad in the final.

=== 2021 to Present ===
On May 2, 2021, Miami Dade FC was crown champions of the Top Tour Tournament at the Estadio Cuauhtémoc in Puebla, Mexico after defeating Cafessa in the final. The tournament trophy was handed by former Mexico National Team captain Carlos Salcido.

== Club culture ==
The Miami Dade FC name comes from the Dade County, which was created on January 18, 1836, under the Territorial Act of the United States. The county was named after Major Francis L. Dade, a soldier killed in 1835 in the Second Seminole War, at what has since been named the Dade Battlefield. At the time of its creation, Dade County included the land that now contains Palm Beach and Broward counties, together with the Florida Keys from Bahia Honda Key north and the land of present-day Miami-Dade County. The county seat was originally at Indian Key in the Florida Keys; then in 1844, the County seat was moved to Miami. The Florida Keys from Key Largo to Bahia Honda were returned to Monroe County in 1866. In 1888 the county seat was moved to Juno, near present-day Juno Beach, Florida, returning to Miami in 1899. In 1909, Palm Beach County was formed from the northern portion of what was then Dade County, and then in 1915, Palm Beach County and Dade County contributed nearly equal portions of land to create what is now Broward County. There have been no significant boundary changes to the county since 1915.

== Reality TV Show ==
Miami Dade FC participated in the reality TV Show, (Sueño Fútbol) in which Scouts of Miami Dade FC had to pick one player out of 25,000 trialists. Produced by RCN Televisión, The show's first episode was aired on March 6, 2016, with a 3.2 rating.

In February 2021, Miami Dade FC participated on the TV Show Camino Al Gol picking one winner out of 5,000 players.

== Affiliation ==
In February 2016, Miami Dade FC announced 2 franchises. Miami Dade FC Macae which is located in Rio de Janeiro, Brazil and Miami Dade FC Barranquilla which is located in Barranquilla, Colombia. In 2019 Miami Dade FC announce their new franchise BIFA in Ho Chi Minh, Vietnam and Miami Dade FC RJ, located in Rio de Janeiro, Brazil.

== Colors and badge ==
On May 5, 2014, Miami Dade FC announced its selection of official club badge and colors, choosing to be represented by a palm tree and ocean, as well as blue and yellow as its primary colors.

== Team kit ==
MDFC has as its primary colors white and black. The second uniform is Blue and white. MDFC will launch a full collection of kits once a year, Its schedule to launch in the second quarter, including also goalkeeper, training and travel kits.

- Home colors – White;
- Away colors – Blue;
- Training – Gray;
- Goalkeeper– Green.

Home 2025	Away 2025	Training 2025	Goalkeeper

== Sponsorship ==
Period	Kit manufacturer	Shirt sponsor
2014–2020	Adidas	Ginga Scout
2021–2023	Adidas	Ginga Scout 'See TV Network; Siva+ Vitaderm; Couto & Silva; ISA
2024-Present	SQ Apparel	Low Spark Films; Ginga Scout; Siva+

== Charitable work ==
On Thanksgiving Day, a half-dozen of the Miami-Dade FC team's players and staff spent an afternoon making pasta at the Fort Lauderdale factory of Spaghetto, which manufactures fresh pasta, to then cook and donate to over 150 homeless.

In July 2015, the United Nations presented Miami Dade FC in Barranquilla, Colombia in an event held at Estadio Metropolitano in front of 15,000 fans, an award for peace against drugs and offense in the world.

=== Notable former players ===
This list of former players includes those who received international caps while playing for the team, made significant contributions to the team in terms of appearances or goals while playing for the team, or who made significant contributions to the sport either before they played for the team, or after they left. It is clearly not yet complete and all inclusive, and additions and refinements will continue to be made over time.

List

- (United States) Bryan Arguez (2014)
- (Brazil) Rodrigo Alvim (2014)
- (Brazil) Paulinho Le Petit (2014)
- (United States) Gabriel Hoyos (2014)
- (Brazil) Tiago Fernandes (2014)
- (Colombia) Diego Serna (2015)
- (Brazil) Marcelo Moretto (2015)
- (Brazil) Kerlon (2015)
- (Nigeria) Teslim Fatusi (2016)
- (Brazil) Rafinha (2018)
- (Brazil) Emerson Ferreira da Rosa (2015-2020)
- (Brazil) Gabriel Rodrigues dos Santos (2017-2020)
- (Brazil) Roberto Linck (2014-2024)

=== Top goal scorers ===
#	Pos.	Name	Nation	Career	League	US Open Cup	Total
1	Midfielder	Victor Hensel	Italy	2019-2022	21	0	**21**
2	Midfielder	Roberto Linck	United States	2014-2022	18	0	**18**
3	Striker	Matheus Ayrolla	United States	2015-2018	12	0	**12**

Last updated: June 23, 2022.
Bolded players are currently on the Miami Dade FC roster.
List only includes stats from 2014 to present

== Team management ==
On December 11, 2013, Joao Garcia was announced as the first head coach of the new franchise, Garcia's official unveiling was made at a press conference on May 27, 2014.

Executive
Club Executive	Roberto Linck
Club Executive	Emerson Ferreira da Rosa
Club Executive	Victor Hensel
Club Executive	Joao Bombonatto
Club Executive	Fabio Simplicio

Last updated: May 7, 2021

== International Friendlies ==
June 22, 2014	Cruzeiro (Brazil)	5–1	(United States) Miami Dade FC	(United States) Framingham, Massachusetts
	Júlio Baptista 17'; Manoel 22'; Marlone 26', 44', 56'	Report	Diego Hurtado 60'	Stadium: Bowditch Field

June 24, 2014	Cruzeiro (Brazil)	2–1	(United States) Miami Dade FC	(United States) Lawrence, Massachusetts
	Lucas Silva 28'; Egídio 73'	Report	Paulinho Le Petit 57'	Stadium: Veterans Memorial Stadium; Referee: (United States) Boris Senic Marin

July 3, 2015	Barranquilla FC U-23 (Colombia)	0–2	(United States) Miami Dade FC	Barranquilla, Colombia
		Report	Kerlon Moura 12'; Matheus Ayrolla 33'	Stadium: Uniautonoma Stadium

July 5, 2015	Uniautónoma F.C. (Colombia)	4–0	(United States) Miami Dade FC	Barranquilla, Colombia
	Mejía 38'; Tapia 73'; Cortés 88', 90'	Report		Stadium: Estadio Metropolitano; Referee: (Colombia) Juan Martinez

May 25, 2016	Haiti	4–1	(United States) Miami Dade FC	(United States) Bradenton, FL
	Kervens Belfort 25', 75'; Kim Jaggy 73'; Kevin Lafrance 79'		Marcelo Norton 35'	Stadium: IMG; Referee: (Colombia) Albert Chiti Escovar

January 29, 2017	Junior Barranquilla 93 (Colombia)	3–2	(United States) Miami Dade FC	Puerto Colombia, Colombia
	Iván Valenciano 25'; Orlando Ballesteros 39'; Aldair Valenciano 80'	Report	Gabriel Rodrigues dos Santos 5' 65'	Stadium: Estadio Puerto Colombia; Referee: (Colombia) Juan Martinez

July 26, 2019	Miami Dade FC (United States)	3–2	(Sweden) IK Arvika	Arvika, Sweden
	Brian Cabraley 25'; Simeon Okoro 77'; Lucas Soares 90'		Simen Slåen Johansen 17' 65'	Stadium: Arvika Stadium; Referee: (Sweden) Martin Thoren, (Sweden) Caroline Lindqvist, (Sweden) Pedram Najafi

July 28, 2019	Miami Dade FC (United States)	0–4	(Sweden) FBK Karlstad	Karlstad, Sweden
		Report	William Fernström 10' Fernström 27' Haytam 54' Molander 90'	Stadium: Karlstad Stadium; Referee: (Sweden) Martin Thoren, (Sweden) Caroline Lindqvist, (Sweden) Pedram Najafi

May 2, 2021	Miami Dade FC (United States)	2–0	(Mexico) Deportivo CAFESSA Jalisco	Puebla, Mexico
	Brian Daza 25'; Steven Gaviria 77'			Stadium: Estadio Cuauhtémoc; Referee: (Mexico) Gustavo Rodriguez, (Mexico) Jose Maldonado, (Mexico) Pedro Durano

June 27, 2023	Miami Dade FC (United States)	0–5	(Netherlands) Ado Den Haag U-21	The Hague, Netherlands
			Lloyd Hendriks 2' Enoch George 27' Giovanni Franken 47' Hendriks 67' Calvin Gustina 87'	Stadium: De Aftrap; Referee: (Netherlands) Thomas Groenendijk

June 29, 2023	Miami Dade FC (United States)	1–1	(Netherlands) Willem II (football club) U21	Tilburg, Netherlands
	Pietro Loli 65'			Stadium: Sportpark Spoordijk; Attendance: 200; Referee: (Netherlands) Thomas Groenendijk

July 1, 2023	Miami Dade FC (United States)	1–1	(Netherlands) Excelsior U-21	Rotterdam, Netherlands
	Victor Milao 65'		Len Bleeker 35'	Stadium: Stadion Woudestein; Attendance: 500; Referee: (Netherlands) Thomas Groenendijk

July 4, 2023	Miami Dade FC (United States)	0–2	(Netherlands) PSV U-19	Eindhoven, Netherlands
			Peter Quispel 10' Bouhoudane 27'	Stadium: De Herdgang; Referee: (Netherlands) Dave Steenis, (Netherlands) Wouter Linders, (Netherlands) Bram Van Der Wei

May 22, 2024	Miami Dade FC (United States)	1–4	(Netherlands) Heerenveen U-21	Heerenveen, Netherlands
				Stadium: Abe Lenstra Stadion; Referee: (Netherlands)

May 1, 2025	Miami Dade FC (United States)	0-4	(Croatia) Dinamo Zagreb U-19	(Netherlands) Zagreb, Croatia
				Stadium: Stadion Maksimir; Referee: (Croatia)

May 3, 2025	Miami Dade FC (United States)	2–1	(Serbia) Red Star Belgrade U-19	(Netherlands) Belgrade, Serbia
	Lucas Amorim 20'Joao Gabriel Santiago 77'		Darije Markočević 35'	Stadium: Red Star Stadium; Attendance: 300; Referee: (Serbia)

September 20, 2025	Miami Dade FC (United States)	1–1	(Greece) Olympiacos U-19	Athens, Greece
	Gilmagnum 70'		Argiris Liatsikouras 35'	Stadium: Karaiskakis Stadium; Attendance: 250; Referee: (Greece)

September 20, 2026	Miami Dade FC (United States)	3–2	(Greece) AEK Athens F.C. U-19	Athens, Greece
	Maximos 25' Maximos 52' Magno 75'		Zois Karargyris 50' Zois Karargyris 80'	Stadium: Agia Sophia Stadium; Attendance: 300; Referee: (Greece)

== Honours ==
=== Domestic ===
==== League ====
- NAL
  - Champions (1): 2014
- APSL
  - Regular Season Champions (1): 2016
  - Regular Season Champions (1): 2017
  - APSL Champions (1): 2017
- National Soccer League (1): 2022

=== Worldwide ===
- United Nations Award - UNODC - Respira Paz (2015): Por su compromisso en la lucha contra la esclavitud del siglo XXI
- Svema Karlstad Trophy – Runners-up (2nd Place) (2019)
- Top Tour Mexico – Champions (2021)

== Club Records ==
- Record national attendance 8,133 v Cruzeiro, Tour of Champions, 2014
- Record international attendance 15,642 v Uniautonoma, Respira Paz, 2015
- Record victory 13–0 v South Florida FC, NAL, 2014
- Record defeat 2–7 v Hurricane FC, UPSL, 2019

== See also ==
- US Club Soccer
- Lamar Hunt U.S. Open Cup
- CONCACAF Champions League
