= Atlanta SC =

Defunct American soccer team

- Full name: Atlanta Soccer Club
- Founded: 2007; 19 years ago (as Atlanta FC)
- Dissolved: 2020; 6 years ago
- Stadium: St. Francis High School
- Website: http://www.atlsoccerclub.com
Home colors	Away colors

Atlanta Soccer Club was an American soccer team based in Atlanta, Georgia. Founded in 2007 as Atlanta FC, it became the reserve team of the Atlanta Silverbacks in 2011, and licensed the name of the first team when it folded in 2016. On January 4, 2019, the club announced that it had parted ways with Atlanta Silverbacks Park, the owner of the trademarks, and had to rebrand as a result.

The logo and colors referred to the peach, a state symbol of Georgia. The final name lasted for two seasons before the club folded.

== History ==
=== Atlanta FC ===
The original Atlanta FC was born out of a U23 team, Lawrenceville FC, that came together to make a successful run to the National Cup finals in 2007. The NPSL began seeking interested ownership groups for its new Southeast Conference at around the same time, and Atlanta FC joined for the division's inaugural season. That team went on to win the NPSL Southeast Conference in its first season, losing out in the playoffs to Midwest Champions St. Paul Twin Stars.

Ramiro Canovas was one of the league's leading scorers in 2008, with five goals in NPSL play and nine overall (including US Open Cup qualifying). Luis Sandoval and Robert Munilla were also named to the 2008 NPSL All-Star team.

In 2009, the club reached the 1st round of the Lamar Hunt US Open Cup by finishing as the runner-up at USASA Region III Open Cup qualifying. The team lost 2–0 to the Charleston Battery.

=== Atlanta Silverbacks Reserves ===
On February 3, 2011, the ownership groups of Atlanta FC and the Atlanta Silverbacks NASL team announced that they would partner and the team would be rebranded as the Atlanta Silverbacks Reserves. During the first season playing as the Reserves, goalkeeper Eric Ati was signed to the first team after the Reserves season in the NPSL concluded. Kingsley Morgan was named to the NPSL All-Star team. The team finished fourth in a highly competitive NPSL South Region.

On 22 February 2013, they announced that they would be taking a hiatus for the 2013 NPSL season. The team returned to the field for the 2014 season and finished the regular season in second place in the Southeast Conference of the NPSL South Region.

=== Atlanta Silverbacks FC ===
When the Silverbacks were disbanded at the end of the 2015 season due to the lack of suitable local ownership, the reserve team licensed the name. They played three seasons as Atlanta Silverbacks FC before losing the license and rebranding to Atlanta SC.

=== Atlanta SC ===
In 2019, Atlanta SC joined the National Independent Soccer Association, a Division III professional league. They began play in 2020 fall season, not advancing to the playoffs, and withdrew before the start of the 2020 spring season. They originally planned to return to play in the fall of 2021, the following season, but were defunct by January 2020.

== Year-by-year ==
Year	Division	League	Regular season	Playoffs	Open Cup
Atlanta FC
2008	4	NPSL	1st, Southeast	Divisional Round	did not qualify
2009	4	NPSL	2nd, Southeast	did not qualify	First round
2010	4	NPSL	5th, Southeast	did not qualify	did not qualify
Atlanta Silverbacks Reserves
2011	4	NPSL	4th, Southeast	did not qualify	did not qualify
2012	4	NPSL	2nd, South-Southeast-East	did not qualify	did not qualify
2013	On Hiatus				
2014	4	NPSL	2nd, Southeast	Divisional Round	did not qualify
2015	4	NPSL	2nd, Southeast	NPSL South Atlantic Conference Champions	did not qualify
Atlanta Silverbacks FC
2016	4	NPSL	2nd, Southeast	NPSL Southeast Conference Semifinal	First round
2017	4	NPSL	2nd, Southeast	Divisional Round	Second round
2018	4	NPSL	2nd, Southeast	NPSL Southeast Conference Champions	did not qualify
Atlanta SC
2019	4	NPSL	6th, Southeast	did not qualify	did not qualify
2019	3	NISA	3rd, East Coast	did not qualify	did not qualify

== Honors ==
=== Domestic ===
- National Premier Soccer League
- Southeast Division (NPSL):
  - Winners: 2008

=== Minor trophies ===
- Region III U-23 National Cup
  - Winners: 2007
  - Runners-up: 2011
- Region III National Open Cup
  - Runners-up: 2009

=== Head coaches ===
- (Costa Rica) Ricardo Montoya (2008–2012)
- (Uruguay) Alejandro Pombo (2014–2015)
- (Brazil) Jacenir Silva (2016)
- (Liberia) Phoday Dolleh (2017)
- (Brazil) Roberto Neves (2018–2019)

== Stadiums ==
- Hoskyn Stadium at Riverwood High School; Sandy Springs, Georgia (2008–2010)
- Atlanta Silverbacks Park; Atlanta, Georgia (2011–2018)
- St. Francis High School; Alpharetta, Georgia (2019)
