= 2020–21 California United Strikers FC season =

Soccer team season

California United Strikers FC
2020–21 NISA season
- Owner: Pete Capriotti; Bronwyn Capriotti
- President: Michael Collins
- Head coach: Don Ebert
- Stadium: Championship Stadium; Irvine, California
- NISA: Fall, Western Conf.: 2nd Spring: 4th
- Playoffs: Fall: Group stage Spring: Did not qualify
- Legends Cup: 6th place
- U.S. Open Cup: Did not qualify
- Top goalscorer: League: Christian Thierjung: 3 All: Christian Thierjung: 5
- Biggest win: CAL 3–0 MSFC (May 16)
- Biggest defeat: CAL 0–3 DCFC (May 12)

The 2020–21 California United Strikers FC season was the club's second in the National Independent Soccer Association (NISA) and second as a professional team overall.

== Roster ==
=== Players ===
As of April 10, 2021

No.	Position	Nation	Player
0	GK	USA	Steven Barrera
1	GK	HAI	Jean Antoine
2	DF	USA	Gonzalo Salguero
3	DF	USA	James McGhee
4	DF	USA	Aydan Bowers
5	DF	USA	Xavier Ikaika Fuerte
6	MF	USA	Duncan Capriotti
7	MF	ENG	Billy Garton Jr.
8	MF	USA	Tony Lopez
9	FW	MEX	Omar Nuño
10	FW	USA	Gustavo Villalobos
11	MF	USA	Shane Kaemerle
12	FW	USA	Michael Bryant
14	FW	GUA	Darwin Lom
15	MF	USA	Evan Waldrep
16	MF	USA	Christian Thierjung
17	DF	USA	Brady Treinen
19	DF	USA	Bryan de la Fuente
20	DF	USA	Garrett Hogbin
21	MF	USA	Alejandro Araneda
22	FW	KOR	Minjae Kwak
23	MF	JPN	Shinya Kadono
24	DF	USA	Chris Klute
27	GK	USA	Mitchell North

=== Staff ===
- (United States) Don Ebert – Head coach
- (United States) Roy Chingirian – Assistant coach
- (United States) Willie Diaz – Assistant coach

== Transfers ==
=== In ===
No.	Pos.	Player	Transferred from	Fee/notes	Date	Source
4	DF	(United States) Aydan Bowers	(Denmark) FC Helsingør	Free transfer	September 1, 2020	
22	FW	(South Korea) Minjae Kwak	(Croatia) HNK Gorica	Free transfer	September 3, 2020	
		16 Returning Players	(United States) California United Strikers FC	Re-signed	February 14, 2021	
27	GK	(United States) Mitchell North	Unattached	Free transfer	February 24, 2021	
1	GK	(Haiti) Jean Antoine	(United States) Detroit City FC	Free transfer	February 24, 2021	
17	DF	(United States) Brady Treinen	(United States) Strikers FC - Irvine	Free transfer	March 12, 2021	
20	DF	(United States) Garrett Hogbin	(United States) Chico State Wildcats	Free transfer	March 20, 2021	
14	FW	(Guatemala) Darwin Lom	(United States) Chattanooga FC	Free transfer	March 24, 2021	
19	DF	(United States) Bryan de la Fuente	(United States) Las Vegas Lights FC	Free transfer	April 6, 2021	
7	MF	(England) Billy Garton Jr.	(United States) San Diego 1904 FC	Free transfer	April 7, 2021	
21	MF	(United States) Alejandro Araneda	(United States) FC Golden State	Free transfer	April 10, 2021	

=== Out ===
No.	Pos.	Player	Transferred to	Fee/notes	Date	Source
14	MF	(United States) Alec Sundly	Unattached	Not re-signed		
7	DF	(United States) Adan Coronado	Unattached	Not re-signed	November 2020	
8	MF	(United States) Kyle O'Brien	Unattached	Not re-signed	November 2020	
12	FW	(Mexico) Miguel Sánchez Rincón	Unattached	Not re-signed	November 2020	
17	FW	(United States) Andy Contreras	Unattached	Not re-signed	November 2020	
18	MF	(United States) Kevin Jeon	Unattached	Not re-signed	November 2020	
20	DF	(Guyana) Cashion London	Unattached	Not re-signed	November 2020	
21	DF	(United States) Beto Navarro	(United States) California United Strikers FC	Joined coaching staff	November 2020	
30	GK	(Netherlands) Jonathan Waterberg	Unattached	Not re-signed	November 2020	
33	DF	(United States) Kevin Garcia-Lopez	Unattached	Not re-signed	November 2020	
11	MF	(United States) Abraham Villon	(United States) Los Angeles Force	Not re-signed	December 18, 2020	
4	DF	(United States) Juan Pablo Ocegueda	(United States) Los Angeles Force	Not re-signed	February 22, 2021	
1	GK	(United States) Kifi Cabrera	(United States) Los Angeles Force	Not re-signed	March 23, 2021	

== Friendlies ==
February 26, 2021 Scrimmage	California United Strikers FC	4–2	San Diego 1904 FC	Irvine, California
1:30 PM PST		Broadcast		Stadium: Orange County Great Park

March 5, 2021 Scrimmage	California United Strikers FC	6–0	Magia Academy	Irvine, California
11:30 AM PST		Broadcast		Stadium: Orange County Great Park

March 13, 2021 Preseason	San Diego Loyal SC	1–2	California United Strikers FC	Chula Vista, California
10:00 AM PST	Jackson	Report	Lopez; Salguero	Stadium: Chula Vista Elite Athlete Training Center; Attendance: 0
Note: Played behind closed doors

March 20, 2021 Preseason	FC Arizona	2–1	California United Strikers FC	Mesa, Arizona
1:00 PM MST	80'	Report	(pen.)	Stadium: Red Mountain High School

March 21, 2021 Preseason	Olympians FC (UPSL)	v	California United Strikers FC	Arizona
1:00 PM MST		Report
Note: Results not published

March 26, 2021 Preseason	California United Strikers FC	3–1	LA Galaxy II	Irvine, California
10:00 AM PDT		Report		Stadium: Orange County Great Park

April 2, 2021 Preseason	California United Strikers FC	4–0	FC Arizona	Irvine, California
10:00 AM PDT		Report; Match Info		Stadium: Orange County Great Park

April 10, 2021 Preseason	Las Vegas Lights FC	v	California United Strikers FC	Los Angeles, California
		Report		Stadium: Banc of California Stadium
Note: Full results not published

== Competitions ==
=== NISA Fall Season ===
On June 4, NISA announced details for the 2020 Fall Season. The eight member teams would be split into conferences, Eastern and Western, with the Strikers playing in the later. The team is set to play two regular season games, one home and one away, against the rest of the Western Conference.

The Fall regular season schedule was announced on July 31, 2020.

==== Standings ====
Pos	Team	Pld	W	D	L	GF	GA	GD	Pts
1	Oakland Roots SC	2	1	1	0	3	1	+2	4
2	California United Strikers FC	2	0	2	0	1	1	0	2
3	Los Angeles Force	2	0	1	1	0	2	−2	1

Source: NISAofficial.com

==== Results summary ====
Overall								Home						Away					
Pld	W	D	L	GF	GA	GD	Pts	W	D	L	GF	GA	GD	W	D	L	GF	GA	GD
2	0	2	0	1	1	0	2	0	1	0	1	1	0	0	1	0	0	0	0

Last updated: September 16, 2020.
Source: Match reports

==== Matches ====
August 29, 2020 Week 1	Los Angeles Force	P–P	California United Strikers FC	Irvine, California
5:00 p.m. PDT		Report		Stadium: OCGP Championship Soccer Stadium
Note: Match was postponed to protest racial injustice after the Shooting of Jacob Blake.

September 13, 2020 Week 2	California United Strikers FC	1–1	Oakland Roots SC	Irvine, California
4:00 p.m. PDT	Thierjung 3'; Lopez (yellow card) 29'; Coronado (yellow card) 61'; Klute (yellow card) 68'; Bowers (yellow card) 77'; Nuño (yellow card) 90+4'	NISA Report; Cal United Report; Broadcast	Abidor (yellow card) 78'; McInerney 90' (pen.)	Stadium: OCGP Championship Soccer Stadium; Attendance: 0 Referee: Karen Callado
Note: Game was played behind closed doors due to the COVID-19 pandemic

September 16, 2020 Week 1 (Replay)	Los Angeles Force	0–0	California United Strikers FC	Irvine, California
7:00 p.m. PDT	Carey (yellow card) 40'; Gordillo (yellow card) 56'; Salazar (yellow card) 70'; Hale (yellow card) 81'	NISA Report; FotMob Report; Broadcast	Garcia-Lopez (yellow card) 80'; Klute (yellow card) 87'	Stadium: OCGP Championship Soccer Stadium; Attendance: 0 Referee: William Hoffman
Note: Match make-up due to the Shooting of Jacob Blake. Game was played behind closed doors due to the COVID-19 pandemic.

=== Fall Playoffs ===
All eight NISA teams qualified for the 2020 Fall tournament, which will be hosted at Keyworth Stadium in Detroit, Michigan, beginning on September 21 ending with the final on October 2.

==== Group stage ====
Pos	Team	Pld	W	D	L	GF	GA	GD	Pts	Qualification
1	Los Angeles Force	3	2	0	1	5	5	0	6	Advance to semifinals
2	Chattanooga FC	3	1	2	0	3	1	+2	5	Advance to semifinals
3	California United Strikers FC	3	1	1	1	5	4	+1	4	
4	New York Cosmos	3	0	1	2	1	4	−3	1	

Updated to match(es) played on September 28, 2020. Source: NISAofficial.com
Rules for classification: 1) Points, 2) Goal differential, 3) Goals scored, 4) Head-to-head record, 5) Coin toss

September 22, 2020 Group stage	California United Strikers FC	2–0	New York Cosmos	Hamtramck, Michigan
5:00 p.m. EDT	Kaemerle 39'; Thierjung 61'; Bryant (yellow card) 64'	NISA Report; FotMob Report; Broadcast		Stadium: Keyworth Stadium; Attendance: 0 Referee: Carter Brochu
Note: Game was played behind closed doors due to the COVID-19 pandemic

September 25, 2020 Group stage	California United Strikers FC	2–3	Los Angeles Force	Hamtramck, Michigan
8:00 p.m. EDT	Nuño 58'; Thierjung 74'	Report; Broadcast	Gordillo (yellow card) 28', (goal) 37' (pen.), 45+1', 69'	Stadium: Keyworth Stadium; Attendance: 0 Referee: Austin Saint
Note: Game was played behind closed doors due to the COVID-19 pandemic

September 28, 2020 Group stage	Chattanooga FC	1–1	California United Strikers FC	Hamtramck, Michigan
5:00 p.m. EDT	Bement 12'; Woodfin (yellow card) 75'; Carr (yellow card) 85'	NISA Report; FotMob Report; Broadcast	Nuño 32'	Stadium: Keyworth Stadium; Attendance: 0 Referee: Conlan Campbell
Note: Game was played behind closed doors due to the COVID-19 pandemic

=== NISA Spring Season ===
==== NISA Legends Cup ====
NISA announced initial spring season plans in early February 2021, including starting the season with a tournament in Chattanooga, Tennessee with a standard regular season to follow. The tournament, now called the NISA Legends Cup, was officially announced on March 10 and is scheduled to run between April 13 and 25. All nine NISA members teams taking part in the Spring were divided into three team groups and played a round robin schedule. The highest placing group winner automatically qualified for the tournament final, while the second and third highest finishing teams overall played one-another in a semifinal to determine a second finalist.

The Strikers were drawn into Group 2 alongside Detroit City FC and the returning Stumptown AC.

===== Standings =====
Pos	Team	Pld	W	D	L	GF	GA	GD	Pts	Qualification
1	Chattanooga FC	2	2	0	0	7	1	+6	6	Advance to Legends Cup final
2	Detroit City FC	2	1	1	0	2	0	+2	4	Advance to Legends Cup semifinal
3	San Diego 1904 FC	2	1	1	0	3	2	+1	4	Advance to Legends Cup semifinal
4	Los Angeles Force	2	1	0	1	4	6	−2	3	
5	Michigan Stars FC	2	0	2	0	2	2	0	2	
6	California United Strikers FC	2	0	2	0	1	1	0	2	
7	Maryland Bobcats FC	2	0	1	1	2	3	−1	1	
8	Stumptown AC	2	0	1	1	1	3	−2	1	
9	New Amsterdam FC	2	0	0	2	2	6	−4	0	

Source: nisasoccer.com
Rules for classification: 1) points; 2) goal differential; 3) goals scored; 4) head to head; 5) goals allowed; 6) coin toss

===== Group 2 results =====
Home \ Away	CAL	DET	STU
California United Strikers FC	—	0–0	1–1
Detroit City FC		—	2–0
Stumptown AC			—

Source: nisasoccer.com
Legend: Blue = home team win; Yellow = draw; Red = away team win.

===== Group stage =====
April 12, 2021 Group 2 Round 1	Detroit City FC	0–0	California United Strikers FC	Chattanooga, Tennessee
5:00 p.m. EDT	Barnabas Tanyi (yellow card) 56'	NISA Report; CAL Report; Broadcast	North (yellow card) 50'; Kwak (yellow card) 75'	Stadium: Finley Stadium

April 19, 2021 Group 2 Round 2	Stumptown AC	1–1	California United Strikers FC	Chattanooga, Tennessee
5:00 p.m. EDT	Williams 6'; McGrath (yellow card) 33'; Ward (yellow card) 53'	Report; Broadcast	Lom 11'; Bryant (yellow card) 24'	Stadium: Finley Stadium

April 22, 2021	#6 California United Strikers FC	3–2	#7 Maryland Bobcats FC	Chattanooga, Tennessee
2:00 p.m. EDT	Araneda 1'; Hogbin 9'; Bryant 14'; Fuerte (yellow card) 83' (yellow-red card) 90+2'	Report; Broadcast	Brown (yellow card) 30', (goal) 51'; Sesay 68'; Fane (yellow card) 69'; Dawkins (yellow card) 81'	Stadium: Finley Stadium

==== Regular season ====
The Spring Season schedule was announced on March 18 with each association member playing eight games, four home and four away, in a single round-robin format.

===== Standings =====
Pos	Team	Pld	W	D	L	GF	GA	GD	Pts	Qualification
1	Detroit City FC (Y, X)	8	6	2	0	14	3	+11	20	Advance to season final
2	Los Angeles Force	8	6	0	2	11	6	+5	18	Advance to spring final (Note: If either 2020 Fall Champion Detroit or 2021 Legends Cup runner-up Chattanooga finish the spring season in first place, or both teams finish in the top two, the spot in the spring final will go to the next best team.)
3	Stumptown AC	8	4	3	1	8	4	+4	15	
4	California United Strikers FC	8	4	1	3	12	10	+2	13	
5	Maryland Bobcats FC	8	3	2	3	9	8	+1	11	
6	Chattanooga FC (Z)	8	2	2	4	6	8	−2	8	Advance to spring final
7	San Diego 1904 FC	8	2	1	5	8	17	−9	7	
8	Michigan Stars FC	8	1	2	5	5	12	−7	5	
9	New Amsterdam FC	8	1	1	6	5	10	−5	4	

Source: nisasoccer.com
Rules for classification: 1) points; 2) goal differential; 3) goals scored; 4) head to head; 5) goals allowed; 6) coin toss
(X) Spring Legends Cup champion; (Y) Fall Champion, qualifies for season final; (Z) Spring Legends Cup runner-up, qualifies for spring final

===== Results summary =====
Overall								Home						Away					
Pld	W	D	L	GF	GA	GD	Pts	W	D	L	GF	GA	GD	W	D	L	GF	GA	GD
8	4	1	3	12	10	+2	13	3	0	1	7	4	+3	1	1	2	5	6	−1

Last updated: June 15, 2021.
Source: Match reports

===== Matches =====
May 2, 2021 Week 1	California United Strikers FC	1–0	Chattanooga FC	Irvine, California
4:00 p.m. PDT	Araneda 23'	NISA Report; Cal Report; Chattanooga Report	McGrath (yellow card) 79'	Stadium: Championship Stadium; Referee: Samantha Martinez

May 12, 2021 Week 2	California United Strikers FC	0–3	Detroit City FC	Irvine, California
7:00 p.m. PDT	Bowers (yellow card) 10'; Bryant (yellow card) 81'	NISA Report; Cal Report; DCFC Report; Broadcast	Faz 17'; Rutz 44'; Rodriguez 67'	Stadium: Championship Stadium; Referee: Omeed Azadpour

May 16, 2021 Week 3	California United Strikers FC	3–0 (Forfeit)	Michigan Stars FC	Irvine, California
1:00 p.m. PDT		Report		Stadium: Championship Stadium
Note: On May 14 the Michigan Stars announced it would not play that weekend's match against the California United Strikers due to unresolved issues with NISA. Later that day the association announced the game would be ruled a forfeit with Cal receiving a 3-0 walkover and all three points in the spring table.

May 22, 2021 Week 4	Stumptown AC	P–P	California United Strikers FC	Matthews, North Carolina
7:00 p.m. EDT				Stadium: Sportsplex at Matthews
Note: Match postponed to June 15 due to positive COVID-19 cases on Stumptown AC

May 29, 2021 Week 5	Los Angeles Force	2–1	California United Strikers FC	Whittier, California
7:00 p.m. PDT	Gordillo (yellow card) 27'; Chaney (yellow card) 29'; Barrera 49', 80'; Alvarado (yellow card) 86'	Report; Broadcast	Fuerte (yellow card) 48'; Nuño 78'	Stadium: Rio Hondo Stadium; Referee: Lorenzo Hernandez

June 2, 2021 Week 6	New Amsterdam FC	1–2	California United Strikers FC	Warwick, New York
2:00 p.m. EDT	Vicente (yellow card) 7'; Angulo 37'; Guarnera (yellow card) 55'; Kone (yellow card) 90'	Report; Broadcast	de la Fuente (yellow card) 7'; Nuño 17' (pen.); Lopez 63'	Stadium: Hudson Sports Complex; Referee: José Martín Arana
Note: Match report missing Vicente's yellow in the 7th minute for disention

June 5, 2021 Week 7	Maryland Bobcats FC	2–1	California United Strikers FC	Germantown, Maryland
7:30 p.m. EDT	Sesay 8', 33', (yellow card) 79'; Dawkins (yellow card) 41'; Kao (yellow card) 65'	Report; Broadcast	Thierjung 32'; Araneda (yellow card) 76' (yellow-red card) 85'	Stadium: Maryland SoccerPlex

June 9, 2021 Week 8	California United Strikers FC	3–1	San Diego 1904 FC	Irvine, California
2:00 p.m. PDT	Ebert (red card) 27'; Waldrep (yellow card) 28'; Thierjung 72'; Lopez 86'; Garton Jr. 90'	Report; Highlights	Cutler 51'; Ramos (yellow card) 54'	Stadium: Auxiliary Field at Great Park
Note: Match moved to Auxiliary Field at Orange County Great Park and not streamed, match report incomplete with details and stats taken from Strikers' Twitter

June 15, 2021 Week 4 (Replay)	Stumptown AC	1–1	California United Strikers FC	Matthews, North Carolina
7:00 p.m. EDT	McGrath (yellow card) 29'; Ramos-Godoy (p); Martinez (red card) 90+2'	Report; Broadcast	Garton Jr. 14' (pen.); Bryant (yellow card) 90+1'	Stadium: Sportsplex at Matthews; Referee: Gustavo Solario
Note: Following the match Stumptown's Franky Martinez was shown a red card which was not listed on the report but shown on stream

=== U.S. Open Cup ===
As a team playing in a recognized professional league, the Strikers would normally be automatically qualified for the U.S. Open Cup. However, with the 2021 edition shorted due to the COVID-19 pandemic, NISA has only been allotted 1 to 2 teams spots. On March 29, U.S. Soccer announced 2020 Fall Champion Detroit City FC as NISA's representative in the tournament.

== Squad statistics ==
As of Match played June 15, 2021

=== Appearances and goals ===
No.	Pos	Nat	Player	Total		Fall Season		Fall Playoffs		Legends Cup		Spring Season	
No.	Pos	Nat	Player	Apps	Goals	Apps	Goals	Apps	Goals	Apps	Goals	Apps	Goals
Goalkeepers
0	GK	(United States) USA	Steven Barrera	8	0	2+0	0	3+0	0	1+0	0	2+0	0
1	GK	(Haiti) HAI	Jean Antoine	0	0	0+0	0	0+0	0	0+0	0	0+0	0
27	GK	(United States) USA	Mitchell North	7	0	0+0	0	0+0	0	2+0	0	5+0	0
Defenders
2	DF	(United States) USA	Gonzalo Salguero	6	0	0+0	0	1+0	0	1+0	0	2+2	0
3	DF	(United States) USA	James McGhee	2	0	0+0	0	0+0	0	0+0	0	1+1	0
4	DF	(United States) USA	Aydan Bowers	11	0	2+0	0	3+0	0	0+0	0	5+1	0
5	DF	(United States) USA	Xavier Ikaika Fuerte	10	0	2+0	0	2+0	0	2+1	0	2+1	0
17	DF	(United States) USA	Brady Treinen	5	0	0+0	0	0+0	0	1+1	0	2+1	0
19	DF	(United States) USA	Bryan de la Fuente	10	0	0+0	0	0+0	0	3+0	0	6+1	0
20	DF	(United States) USA	Garrett Hogbin	6	1	0+0	0	0+0	0	1+0	1	5+0	0
24	DF	(United States) USA	Chris Klute	14	0	2+0	0	3+0	0	1+2	0	3+3	0
Midfielders
6	MF	(United States) USA	Duncan Capriotti	11	0	1+0	0	2+0	0	2+0	0	6+0	0
7	MF	(England) ENG	Billy Garton Jr.	7	2	0+0	0	0+0	0	2+1	0	2+2	2
8	MF	(United States) USA	Tony Lopez	13	2	2+0	0	0+2	0	1+1	0	7+0	2
11	MF	(United States) USA	Shane Kaemerle	10	1	2+0	0	2+0	1	2+1	0	1+2	0
15	MF	(United States) USA	Evan Waldrep	11	0	0+1	0	1+2	0	1+1	0	1+4	0
16	MF	(United States) USA	Christian Thierjung	15	5	2+0	1	3+0	2	3+0	0	7+0	2
21	MF	(United States) USA	Alejandro Araneda	9	2	0+0	0	0+0	0	3+0	1	4+2	1
23	MF	(Japan) JPN	Shinya Kadono	13	0	2+0	0	3+0	0	2+1	0	4+1	0
Forwards
9	FW	(Mexico) MEX	Omar Nuño	12	4	1+1	0	1+2	2	0+0	0	4+3	2
10	FW	(United States) USA	Gustavo Villalobos	0	0	0+0	0	0+0	0	0+0	0	0+0	0
12	FW	(United States) USA	Michael Bryant	14	1	1+0	0	3+0	0	3+0	1	6+1	0
14	FW	(Guatemala) GUA	Darwin Lom	5	1	0+0	0	0+0	0	2+1	1	2+0	0
22	FW	(South Korea) KOR	Minjae Kwak	7	0	0+0	0	0+0	0	0+3	0	0+4	0
Left during season
1	GK	(United States) USA	Kifi Cabrera	0	0	0+0	0	0+0	0	-	-	-	-
4	DF	(United States) USA	Juan Pablo Ocegueda	2	0	0+1	0	0+1	0	-	-	-	-
7	DF	(United States) USA	Adan Coronado	1	0	0+1	0	0+0	0	-	-	-	-
8	MF	(United States) USA	Kyle O'Brien	1	0	0+0	0	0+1	0	-	-	-	-
11	MF	(United States) USA	Abraham Villon	5	0	1+1	0	3+0	0	-	-	-	-
12	FW	(Mexico) MEX	Miguel Sánchez Rincón	1	0	0+1	0	0+0	0	-	-	-	-
17	FW	(United States) USA	Andy Contreras	2	0	0+1	0	0+1	0	-	-	-	-
18	MF	(United States) USA	Kevin Jeon	2	0	1+0	0	0+1	0	-	-	-	-
20	DF	(Guyana) GUY	Cashion London	0	0	0+0	0	0+0	0	-	-	-	-
21	DF	(United States) USA	Beto Navarro	0	0	0+0	0	0+0	0	-	-	-	-
30	GK	(Netherlands) NED	Jonathan Waterberg	0	0	0+0	0	0+0	0	-	-	-	-
33	DF	(United States) USA	Kevin Garcia-Lopez	5	0	1+1	0	3+0	0	-	-	-	-

=== Goal scorers ===
Place	Position	Nation	Number	Name	Fall Season	Fall Playoffs	Legends Cup	Spring Season	Total
1	MF	(United States)	16	Christian Thierjung	1	2	0	2	5
2	FW	(Mexico)	9	Omar Nuño	0	2	0	2	4
3	MF	(England)	7	Billy Garton Jr.	0	0	0	2	2
3	MF	(United States)	8	Tony Lopez	0	0	0	2	2
3	MF	(United States)	21	Alejandro Araneda	0	0	1	1	2
4	MF	(United States)	11	Shane Kaemerle	0	1	0	0	1
4	FW	(United States)	12	Michael Bryant	0	0	1	0	1
4	FW	(Guatemala)	14	Darwin Lom	0	0	1	0	1
4	DF	(United States)	20	Garrett Hogbin	0	0	1	0	1

=== Disciplinary record ===
Number	Nation	Position	Name	Fall Season		Fall Playoff		Legends Cup		Spring Season		Total	
Number	Nation	Position	Name	Booked	Sent off (straight red)	Booked	Sent off (straight red)	Booked	Sent off (straight red)	Booked	Sent off (straight red)	Booked	Sent off (straight red)
4	(United States)	DF	Aydan Bowers	1	0	0	0	0	0	1	0	2	0
5	(United States)	DF	Xavier Ikaika Fuerte	0	0	0	0	2	1	1	0	3	1
7	(United States)	DF	Adan Coronado	1	0	0	0	-	-	-	-	1	0
8	(United States)	MF	Tony Lopez	1	0	0	0	0	0	0	0	1	0
9	(Mexico)	FW	Omar Nuño	1	0	0	0	0	0	0	0	1	0
12	(United States)	FW	Michael Bryant	0	0	1	0	1	0	2	0	4	0
15	(United States)	MF	Evan Waldrep	0	0	0	0	0	0	1	0	1	0
19	(United States)	DF	Bryan de la Fuente	0	0	0	0	0	0	1	0	1	0
21	(United States)	MF	Alejandro Araneda	0	0	0	0	0	0	2	1	2	1
22	(South Korea)	FW	Minjae Kwak	0	0	0	0	1	0	0	0	1	0
24	(United States)	DF	Chris Klute	2	0	0	0	0	0	0	0	2	0
27	(United States)	GK	Mitchell North	0	0	0	0	1	0	0	0	1	0
33	(United States)	DF	Kevin Garcia-Lopez	1	0	0	0	-	-	-	-	1	0
	(United States)	HC	Don Ebert	0	0	0	0	0	0	0	1	0	1
