= 2019–20 California United Strikers FC season =

Club's inaugural season in the National Independent Soccer Association

California United Strikers FC
2019–20 NISA season
- Owner: Pete Capriotti; Bronwyn Capriotti
- President: Michael Collins
- Head coach: Don Ebert
- Stadium: Championship Soccer Stadium; Irvine, California
- NISA: Fall, West Coast Conf.: 2nd Spring: 2nd
- Playoffs: Fall: West Coast Champion; Spring: N/A
- U.S. Open Cup: Cancelled
- Top goalscorer: League: Christian Thierjung (6); All: Christian Thierjung (6)
- Highest home attendance: 2,258 (February 29 vs. Michigan)
- Lowest home attendance: 1,025 (September 25 vs. Oakland)
- Average home league attendance: 1,619
- Biggest win: 4–1 (October 20 vs. San Diego)
- Biggest defeat: 1–3 (September 14 vs. San Diego)

The 2019–20 California United Strikers FC season was the club's inaugural season in the National Independent Soccer Association, a newly established third division soccer league in the United States.

== Overview ==
Since 2017, Cal United had attempted to join two professional leagues, the North American Soccer League and National Premier Soccer League's proposed professional league (beginning with the NPSL Founders Cup tournament), with neither effort taking form. In June 2019 the team was accepted into NISA as a member for the league's inaugural season.

The Strikers finished the fall season in second place with a 2-3-1 (9 pts) record, clinching a spot in the West Coast Championship against LA Force. In the final, which was played at Championship Stadium with Cal being designated the "away" team due to seeding, the Strikers beat LA in a penalty kick shootout and won its first professional trophy.

In early July 2019, prior to the NISA season kicking off, the team beat 30-time Liga Nacional de Fútbol de Guatemala champions C.S.D. Municipal, 3–1, in the latter's pre-season tour of the United States.

On April 27, 2020, following a stoppage of play and subsequent extension due to the COVID-19 pandemic, NISA announced the cancellation of the 2020 Spring season.

== Players ==
As of March 1, 2020

No.	Position	Nation	Player
0	GK	USA	Steven Barrera
1	GK	USA	Kifi Cabrera
2	DF	USA	Gonzalo Salguero
3	DF	USA	James McGhee
4	DF	USA	Juan Pablo Ocegueda
5	DF	USA	Xavier Ikaika Fuerte
6	MF	USA	Duncan Capriotti
7	DF	USA	Adan Coronado
8	MF	USA	Kyle O'Brien
9	FW	MEX	Omar Nuño
10	FW	USA	Gustavo Villalobos
11	MF	USA	Abraham Villon
12	FW	MEX	Miguel Sánchez Rincón
13	FW	USA	Michael Bryant
14	MF	USA	Alec Sundly
15	MF	USA	Evan Waldrep
16	MF	USA	Christian Thierjung
17	FW	USA	Andy Contreras
18	MF	USA	Kevin Jeon
19	MF	USA	Shane Kaemerle
20	DF	GUY	Cashion London
21	DF	USA	Beto Navarro
23	MF	JPN	Shinya Kadono
24	DF	USA	Chris Klute
29	MF	USA	Tony Lopez
30	GK	NED	Jonathan Waterberg
33	DF	USA	Kevin Garcia-Lopez

=== Staff ===
- (United States) Don Ebert – Head coach
- (United States) Roy Chingirian – Assistant coach

== Transfers ==
=== In ===
#	Pos.	Player	Signed from	Details	Date	Source
18	MF	(United States) Kevin Jeon	Orange County FC	Free transfer	August 2, 2019	
24	DF	(United States) Chris Klute	California United FC II	Free transfer	August 2, 2019	
11	MF	(United States) Abraham Villon	California United FC II	Free transfer	August 2, 2019	
6	MF	(United States) Duncan Capriotti	L.A. Wolves FC	Free transfer	August 2, 2019	
10	FW	(United States) Gustavo Villalobos	FC Golden State	Free transfer	August 2, 2019	
5	DF	(United States) Xavier Ikaika Fuerte	California United FC II	Free transfer	August 5, 2019	
2	DF	(United States) Gonzalo Salguero	California United FC II	Free transfer	August 5, 2019	
7	DF	(United States) Adan Coronado	California United FC II	Free transfer	August 5, 2019	
8	MF	(United States) Kyle O'Brien	California United FC II	Free transfer	August 6, 2019	
20	DF	(Guyana) Cashion London	Unattached	Free transfer	August 6, 2019	
1	GK	(United States) Kifi Cabrera	California United FC II	Free transfer	August 6, 2019	
16	MF	(United States) Christian Thierjung	Tulsa Roughnecks	Free transfer	August 7, 2019	
4	DF	(United States) Juan Pablo Ocegueda	California United FC II	Free transfer	August 7, 2019	
17	FW	(United States) Andy Contreras	California United FC II	Free transfer	August 7, 2019	
7	FW	(Mexico) Cristian Gordillo	California United FC II	Free transfer	August 8, 2019	
19	MF	(United States) Michael Sullivan	Unattached	Free transfer	August 8, 2019	
12	FW	(Mexico) Miguel Sánchez Rincón	California United FC II	Free transfer	August 8, 2019	
15	MF	(United States) Evan Waldrep	Phoenix Rising FC	Free transfer	August 12, 2019	
3	DF	(United States) James McGhee	Colorado Mesa Mavericks	Free transfer	August 12, 2019	
14	FW	(Ivory Coast) Jackson Jellah	Grand Canyon Antelopes	Free transfer	August 12, 2019	
0	GK	(United States) Steven Barrera	Ventura County Fusion	Free transfer	August 13, 2019	
9	FW	(Mexico) Omar Nuño	FC Arizona	Free transfer	August 13, 2019	
21	DF	(United States) Beto Navarro	Fresno FC	Free transfer	August 13, 2019	
13	FW	(United States) Michael Bryant	Orange County FC	Free transfer	August 29, 2019	
30	GK	(Netherlands) Jonathan Waterberg	(Netherlands) TOP Oss	Free transfer	January 16, 2020	
19	MF	(United States) Shane Kaemerle	Strikers FC - Irvine	Free transfer	February 19, 2020	
33	DF	(United States) Kevin Garcia-Lopez	Las Vegas Lights FC	Free transfer	February 24, 2020	
29	MF	(United States) Tony Lopez	(Germany) Rot-Weiss Walldorf	Free transfer	February 25, 2020	
14	MF	(United States) Alec Sundly	(Germany) 1. FCA Darmstadt	Free transfer	February 26, 2020	
23	MF	(Japan) Shinya Kadono	Loudoun United FC	Free transfer	February 26, 2020	

=== Out ===
#	Pos.	Player	Signed to	Details	Date	Source
7	DF	(Mexico) Cristian Gordillo	Orange County FC 2	Free transfer	November 18, 2019	
14	FW	(Ivory Coast) Jackson Jellah	Unattached	Not retained	December 1, 2019	
19	MF	(United States) Michael Sullivan	Unattached	Not retained	December 1, 2019	

== Friendlies ==
July 6, 2019 Friendly	California United Strikers FC	3–1	(Guatemala) C.S.D. Municipal	Los Angeles, California
6:30 PDT	Waldrep 33'; Gordillo 49'; Fuerte 56'	Match Broadcast	de León 48'	Stadium: John C. Fremont High School

February 7, 2020 Preseason	LA Galaxy II	v	California United Strikers FC	Carson, California
10:00 PDT				Stadium: Dignity Health Sports Park
Note: Result not published.

== Competitions ==
=== NISA Fall season (Showcase) ===
Details for the 2019 NISA Fall season were announced July 25, 2019.

==== Standings ====
Pos	Team	Pld	W	D	L	GF	GA	GD	Pts	Qualification
1	Los Angeles Force	6	3	2	1	8	7	+1	11	West Coast Championship
2	California United Strikers FC (O)	6	2	3	1	13	9	+4	9	West Coast Championship
3	San Diego 1904 FC	6	2	0	4	9	15	−6	6	
4	Oakland Roots SC	6	0	3	3	10	13	−3	3	

Source: NISAofficial.com
(O) Play-off winners

==== Results summary ====
Overall								Home						Away					
Pld	W	D	L	GF	GA	GD	Pts	W	D	L	GF	GA	GD	W	D	L	GF	GA	GD
7	3	3	1	17	10	+7	12	3	1	0	11	2	+9	0	2	1	6	8	−2

Last updated: 11 November 2019.
Source: Match reports

==== Matches ====
August 31, 2019 1	Oakland Roots SC	3–3	California United Strikers FC	Oakland, California
7:00 p.m.	McInerney 20', 31', 43'; Gonzalez (yellow card) 54'; Joya (yellow card) 57'	Report; MyCujoo Broadcast	Klute 45', (yellow card) 90+1'; Villalobos 79'; Thierjung 88'	Stadium: Laney College; Attendance: 4,556

September 14, 2019 2	San Diego 1904 FC	3–1	California United Strikers FC	San Diego, California
7:04 p.m	Ramirez Jr. 11', 62'; Garton (yellow card) 22', (goal) 52' (pen.); Barton (yellow card) 90+1'	Report; MyCujoo Broadcast	Nuño (yellow card) 9', (goal) 25'; Rincón (yellow card) 75'	Stadium: SDCCU Stadium; Attendance: 2,838; Referee: Samantha Martinzes

September 22, 2019 3	California United Strikers FC	3–0	Los Angeles Force	Irvine, California
7:00 p.m.	Villalobos 11'; Thierjung 51'; Klute 80'	Report; MyCujoo Broadcast	Silva dos Anjos (yellow card) 15'; Villon Jr. (yellow card) 43'; Tanko (yellow card) 63'	Stadium: Championship Soccer Stadium; Attendance: 2,092; Referee: Omeed Azadpour

September 25, 2019 4	California United Strikers FC	1–1	Oakland Roots SC	Irvine, California
7:00 p.m.	Thierjung 4'; Ebert (Coach) (yellow card) 17'; Bryant (yellow card) 84'; Chingirian (Ast. Coach) (yellow card) 90+1'	Report; MyCujoo Broadcast	Masch (yellow card) 22'; Jimenez (yellow card) 27'; Chaffin 35'; Guzmán (yellow card) 55'; McInerney (yellow card) 80'	Stadium: Championship Soccer Stadium; Attendance: 1,025; Referee: Karen Callado

October 2, 2019 5	California United Strikers FC	3–0	San Diego 1904 FC	Irvine, California
7:00 p.m.	Thierjung 4'; Contreras 59'; Villalobos 90+1'	Report; MyCujoo Broadcast	Zambrano (yellow card) 53'; Taylor (yellow card) 84'	Stadium: Championship Soccer Stadium; Attendance: 1,102; Referee: Christopher Calderon

October 20, 2019 6	California United Strikers FC	4–1	San Diego 1904 FC	Irvine, California
4:00 p.m.	Nuño 18'; Contreras (yellow card) 45+3', (goal) 52'; Bryant 83'; Thierjung 90'	Report; MyCujoo Broadcast	Ramirez Jr. (yellow card) 31'; Zambrano 71'; Wright (yellow card) 88'; Velela (yellow card) 89'	Stadium: Championship Soccer Stadium; Attendance: 1,620; Referee: Samantha Martinez
Note: Due to the Strikers playing more than six games, this game was not counted towards their standings but did count for San Diego.

October 26, 2019 7	Los Angeles Force	2–2	California United Strikers FC	Whittier, California
7:00 p.m.	Culwell (yellow card) 22', (goal) 45+3'; Silva dos Anjos (yellow card) 15', (goal) 74'	Report; MyCujoo Broadcast	Thierjung 20' (pen.), (yellow card) 45+3'; Bryant (yellow card) 34'; Villalobos 64'; Klute (yellow card) 84'	Stadium: Rio Hondo Stadium; Attendance: 922; Referee: Brandon Stevis

==== Fall Playoff ====
November 10, 2019	Los Angeles Force	2–2 (a.e.t.) (3–5 p)	California United Strikers FC	Irvine, California
4:00 p.m.	Vazquez (yellow card) 18'; Cardenas Jr. 61', (yellow card) 102'; Merlano 72'; Tanko (yellow card) 81'; Peterson (Coach) (yellow card) 86'; Moran (Ast. Coach) (yellow card) 86'	Report; MyCujoo Broadcast	Villalobos 21'; Capriotti (yellow card) 58'; Bryant 86'; Rincón (yellow card) 106'	Stadium: Championship Soccer Stadium; Attendance: 2,826; Referee: William Randy Hoffman
	Penalties
	Charles (penalty missed); Muchiri (penalty scored); Ruiz (penalty scored); Tanko (penalty scored)		(penalty scored) Ocegueda; (penalty scored) Nuño; (penalty scored) Rincón; (penalty scored) Villalobos; (penalty scored) Salguero

=== NISA Spring Season ===
Details for the 2020 NISA Spring season were announced January 27, 2020.

==== Standings ====
Pos	Team	Pld	W	D	L	GF	GA	GD	Pts	Qualification
1	Oakland Roots SC	2	1	1	0	3	2	+1	4	Playoffs
2	California United Strikers FC (Q)	2	1	1	0	1	0	+1	4	Playoffs
3	Detroit City FC	1	1	0	0	2	0	+2	3	Playoffs
4	Stumptown Athletic	2	0	2	0	3	3	0	2	Playoffs
5	San Diego 1904 FC	2	0	2	0	2	2	0	2	
6	Chattanooga FC	1	0	1	0	1	1	0	1	
7	Los Angeles Force	2	0	1	1	1	3	−2	1	
8	Michigan Stars FC	2	0	0	2	1	3	−2	0	

Updated to match(es) played on March 8, 2020. Source: NISAofficial.com
(Q) Qualified for the phase indicated

==== Results summary ====
Overall								Home						Away					
Pld	W	D	L	GF	GA	GD	Pts	W	D	L	GF	GA	GD	W	D	L	GF	GA	GD
2	1	1	0	1	0	+1	4	1	0	0	1	0	+1	0	1	0	0	0	0

Last updated: 8 March 2020.
Source: Match reports

==== Matches ====
February 29, 2020 1	California United Strikers FC	1–0	Michigan Stars FC	Irvine, California
7:00 p.m.	Jeon 59'	Report; MyCujoo Broadcast	Reynolds (yellow card) 7'; Sullivan (yellow card) 23'; Schneider (yellow card) 82'	Stadium: Championship Soccer Stadium; Attendance: 2,258; Referee: William Randy Hoffman

March 8, 2020 2	San Diego 1904 FC	0–0	California United Strikers FC	San Diego, California
3:00 p.m.	Ramos (yellow card) 26'; Garton (yellow card) 80'	Report; MyCujoo Broadcast	Capriotti (yellow card) 22'	Stadium: Lincoln High School; Attendance: 749; Referee: Samantha Martinez

March 14, 2020 3	California United Strikers FC	P–P	San Diego 1904 FC	Irvine, California
7:00 p.m				Stadium: Championship Soccer Stadium
Note: On March 12, NISA announced that it would be suspending its season 30 days due to the COVID-19 pandemic

March 21, 2020 4	Chattanooga FC	P–P	California United Strikers FC	Chattanooga, Tennessee
3:00 p.m.				Stadium: Finley Stadium
Note: On March 12, NISA announced that it would be suspending its season 30 days due to the COVID-19 pandemic

March 28, 2020 5	Los Angeles Force	P–P	California United Strikers FC	TBD
7:00 p.m.				Stadium: TBD
Note: On March 12, NISA announced that it would be suspending its season 30 days due to the COVID-19 pandemic

April 4, 2020 6	Michigan Stars FC	P–P	California United Strikers FC	Pontiac, Michigan
7:30 p.m.				Stadium: Ultimate Soccer Arenas Outdoor Stadium
Note: On March 12, NISA announced that it would be suspending its season 30 days due to the COVID-19 pandemic

April 11, 2020 7	Oakland Roots SC	P–P	California United Strikers FC	Oakland, California
5:10 p.m.				Stadium: Laney College
Note: On March 30, NISA announced that it would be extending its suspension of play to May 10 in accordance with CDC guidelines for COVID-19

April 19, 2020 8	California United Strikers FC	P–P	Detroit City FC	Irvine, California
4:00 p.m.				Stadium: Championship Soccer Stadium
Note: On March 30, NISA announced that it would be extending its suspension of play to May 10 in accordance with CDC guidelines for COVID-19

May 2, 2020 9	California United Strikers FC	P–P	Stumptown Athletic	Irvine, California
7:00 p.m.				Stadium: Championship Soccer Stadium
Note: On March 30, NISA announced that it would be extending its suspension of play to May 10 in accordance with CDC guidelines for COVID-19

May 10, 2020 10	California United Strikers FC	P–P	Chattanooga FC	Irvine, California
4:00 p.m.				Stadium: Championship Soccer Stadium
Note: On March 30, NISA announced that it would be extending its suspension of play to May 10 in accordance with CDC guidelines for COVID-19

May 16, 2020 11	Stumptown Athletic	P–P	California United Strikers FC	Pineville, North Carolina
7:04 p.m.				Stadium: CSA OrthoCarolina Sportsplex
Note: On April 28, NISA announced the cancellation of the 2020 Spring season due to COVID-19

May 23, 2020 12	California United Strikers FC	P–P	Los Angeles Force	Irvine, California
7:00 p.m.				Stadium: Championship Soccer Stadium
Note: On April 28, NISA announced the cancellation of the 2020 Spring season due to COVID-19

May 30, 2020 13	Detroit City FC	P–P	California United Strikers FC	Hamtramck, Michigan
TBA p.m.				Stadium: Keyworth Stadium
Note: On April 28, NISA announced the cancellation of the 2020 Spring season due to COVID-19

June 7, 2020 14	California United Strikers FC	P–P	Oakland Roots SC	Irvine, California
4:00 p.m.				Stadium: Championship Soccer Stadium
Note: On April 28, NISA announced the cancellation of the 2020 Spring season due to COVID-19

=== U.S. Open Cup ===
Cal United will enter the 2020 U.S. Open Cup with the rest of the National Independent Soccer Association teams in the Second Round. It was announced on January 29 that their first opponent would be USL Championship side Orange County SC.

April 8 Second Round	Orange County SC (USLC) (California)	P–P	California United Strikers FC (NISA)	Irvine, California
7:30 pm PDT				Stadium: Championship Soccer Stadium
Note: On March 13, U.S. Soccer’s Open Cup Committee announced the tournament would be temporarily suspended due to the COVID-19 pandemic

== Squad statistics ==
As of Match played 8 March 2020

=== Appearances and goals ===
No.	Pos	Nat	Player	Total		Fall Season		Fall Playoffs		Spring Season		Spring Playoff		U.S. Open Cup	
No.	Pos	Nat	Player	Apps	Goals	Apps	Goals	Apps	Goals	Apps	Goals	Apps	Goals	Apps	Goals
Goalkeepers
0	GK	(United States) USA	Steven Barrera	8	0	5	0	1	0	2	0	-	-	-	-
1	GK	(United States) USA	Kifi Cabrera	3	0	3	0	0	0	0	0	-	-	-	-
30	GK	(Netherlands) NED	Jonathan Waterberg	0	0	0	0	0	0	0	0	-	-	-	-
Defenders
2	DF	(United States) USA	Gonzalo Salguero	10	0	7	0	1	0	2	0	-	-	-	-
3	DF	(United States) USA	James McGhee	2	0	2	0	0	0	0	0	-	-	-	-
4	DF	(United States) USA	Juan Pablo Ocegueda	3	0	2	0	1	0	0	0	-	-	-	-
5	DF	(United States) USA	Xavier Ikaika Fuerte	9	0	6	0	1	0	2	0	-	-	-	-
7	DF	(United States) USA	Adan Coronado	3	0	3	0	0	0	0	0	-	-	-	-
20	DF	(Guyana) GUY	Cashion London	1	0	1	0	0	0	0	0	-	-	-	-
21	DF	(United States) USA	Beto Navarro	5	0	4	0	1	0	0	0	-	-	-	-
24	DF	(United States) USA	Chris Klute	10	2	7	2	1	0	2	0	-	-	-	-
33	DF	(United States) USA	Kevin Garcia-Lopez	2	0	0	0	0	0	2	0	-	-	-	-
Midfielders
6	MF	(United States) USA	Duncan Capriotti	10	0	7	0	1	0	2	0	-	-	-	-
8	MF	(United States) USA	Kyle O'Brien	1	0	1	0	0	0	0	0	-	-	-	-
11	MF	(United States) USA	Abraham Villon	8	0	6	0	1	0	1	0	-	-	-	-
14	MF	(United States) USA	Alec Sundly	2	0	0	0	0	0	2	0	-	-	-	-
15	MF	(United States) USA	Evan Waldrep	9	0	7	0	1	0	1	0	-	-	-	-
16	MF	(United States) USA	Christian Thierjung	10	6	7	6	1	0	2	0	-	-	-	-
18	MF	(United States) USA	Kevin Jeon	9	1	6	0	1	0	2	1	-	-	-	-
19	MF	(United States) USA	Shane Kaemerle	1	0	0	0	0	0	1	0	-	-	-	-
23	MF	(Japan) JPN	Shinya Kadono	2	0	0	0	0	0	2	0	-	-	-	-
29	MF	(United States) USA	Tony Lopez	1	0	0	0	0	0	1	0	-	-	-	-
Forwards
9	FW	(Mexico) MEX	Omar Nuño	10	2	7	2	1	0	2	0	-	-	-	-
10	FW	(United States) USA	Gustavo Villalobos	10	5	7	4	1	1	2	0	-	-	-	-
12	FW	(Mexico) MEX	Miguel Sánchez Rincón	8	0	7	0	1	0	0	0	-	-	-	-
13	FW	(United States) USA	Michael Bryant	9	2	6	1	1	1	2	0	-	-	-	-
17	FW	(United States) USA	Andy Contreras	6	2	5	2	1	0	0	0	-	-	-	-
Left during season
7	FW	(Mexico) MEX	Cristian Gordillo	0	0	0	0	0	0	-	-	-	-	-	-
14	FW	(Ivory Coast) CIV	Jackson Jellah	1	0	1	0	0	0	-	-	-	-	-	-
19	MF	(United States) USA	Michael Sullivan	1	0	1	0	0	0	-	-	-	-	-	-

=== Goal scorers ===
Place	Position	Nation	Number	Name	Fall Season	Fall Playoff	Spring Season	Spring Playoff	U.S. Open Cup	Total
1	MF	(United States)	16	Christian Thierjung	6	0	0	-	-	6
2	FW	(United States)	10	Gustavo Villalobos	4	1	0	-	-	5
3	FW	(Mexico)	9	Omar Nuño	2	0	0	-	-	2
3	FW	(United States)	13	Michael Bryant	1	1	0	-	-	2
3	FW	(United States)	17	Andy Contreras	2	0	0	-	-	2
3	DF	(United States)	24	Chris Klute	2	0	0	-	-	2
4	MF	(United States)	18	Kevin Jeon	0	0	1	-	-	1

=== Disciplinary record ===
Number	Nation	Position	Name	Fall Season		Fall Playoff		Spring Season		Spring Playoff		U.S. Open Cup		Total	
Number	Nation	Position	Name	Booked	Sent off (straight red)	Booked	Sent off (straight red)	Booked	Sent off (straight red)	Booked	Sent off (straight red)	Booked	Sent off (straight red)	Booked	Sent off (straight red)
6	(United States)	MF	Duncan Capriotti	0	0	1	0	1	0	-	-	-	-	2	0
9	(Mexico)	FW	Omar Nuño	1	0	0	0	0	0	-	-	-	-	1	0
10	(United States)	FW	Gustavo Villalobos	1	0	0	0	0	0	-	-	-	-	1	0
12	(Mexico)	FW	Miguel Sánchez Rincón	1	0	1	0	0	0	-	-	-	-	2	0
13	(United States)	FW	Michael Bryant	2	0	0	0	0	0	-	-	-	-	2	0
17	(United States)	FW	Andy Contreras	1	0	0	0	0	0	-	-	-	-	1	0
24	(United States)	DF	Chris Klute	2	0	0	0	0	0	-	-	-	-	2	0
X	(United States)	-	Don Ebert	1	0	0	0	0	0	-	-	-	-	1	0
X	(United States)	-	Roy Chingirian	1	0	0	0	0	0	-	-	-	-	1	0
