= 2019–20 National Independent Soccer Association season =

1st season of the National Independent Soccer Association

National Independent Soccer Association
- Season: 2019–20 season
- Dates: Fall: August 31 – November 10, 2019; Spring: February 29 – March 12, 2020 (play suspended)
- Matches: 27
- Goals: 92 (3.41 per match)
- Top goalscorer: (United States) Jack McInerney (8 goals)
- Biggest home win: Miami FC 8–1 Philadelphia Fury (September 15, 2019)
- Biggest away win: Atlanta SC 1–3 Stumptown Athletic (September 14, 2019)
- Highest scoring: Miami FC 8–1 Philadelphia Fury (September 15, 2019)
- Highest attendance: 5,723; Oakland Roots SC 1–1 Los Angeles Force (October 19, 2019)
- Lowest attendance: 112; Atlanta SC 1–3 Stumptown Athletic (September 14, 2019)
- Total attendance: Fall: 29,893; Spring: 15,912; Overall: 45,805
- Average attendance: Fall: 1,495; Spring: 2,273; Overall: 1,696

The 2019–20 NISA season was the inaugural season of the National Independent Soccer Association, a third-division soccer competition in the United States. The regular season was divided into two halves, Fall and Spring, intended to culminate in playoffs. The Fall season, branded as the "NISA Showcase", featured seven teams; the champions of the East and West conferences earned berths into the 2020 playoffs. The Spring season expanded to eight teams and switched to a single-table format, with the top three teams set to join the Fall West champion, California United Strikers, in the postseason. However, the Spring season was suspended on March 12 for an initial 30-day period due to the coronavirus pandemic. The suspension was subsequently extended in accordance with CDC guidelines before the season was officially cancelled on April 27, 2020.

== Teams ==
Locations of announced clubs
- Full season club
- Spring expansion club
- Fall-only club

=== Stadiums and locations ===
Team	Location	Stadium	Capacity
Atlanta SC (Note: Played in the Fall season, but withdrew before the Spring season.)	Alpharetta, Georgia	St. Francis High School; Lupo Field at Life University	— —
California United Strikers FC	Irvine, California	Championship Stadium	5,000
Chattanooga FC (Note: Did not play in the Fall season, but were approved in time to join the 2020 Spring season.)	Chattanooga, Tennessee	Finley Stadium	20,668
Detroit City FC	Hamtramck, Michigan	Keyworth Stadium	7,933
Los Angeles Force	Whittier, California	Rio Hondo College (Note: Fall season); Jesse Owens Stadium (Note: Spring season)	1,000; 5,000
Miami FC (Note: Played in the Fall season, but withdrew before the Spring season, after joining the USL Championship.)	Miami, Florida	Buccaneer Field; Riccardo Silva Stadium	1,500; 23,500
Michigan Stars FC	Pontiac, Michigan	Ultimate Soccer Arena	5,000
Oakland Roots SC	Oakland, California	Laney College	5,500
Philadelphia Fury (Note: Philadelphia Fury withdrew from the NISA Showcase after the season started. They forfeited all remaining games which were recorded as a 3–0 losses.)	Philadelphia, Pennsylvania	Franklin Field	52,958
San Diego 1904 FC	San Diego, California	SDCCU Stadium; Lincoln High School	70,561; 3,700
Stumptown Athletic	Matthews, North Carolina	CSA OrthoCarolina Sportsplex; Sportsplex at Matthews	1,200; 5,000

=== Personnel and sponsorship ===
Note: The league signed a deal with Hummel to be the official kit manufacturer, but it still allowed clubs to find their own provider.

Team	Head coach	Captain(s)	Kit manufacturer	Shirt sponsor
California United Strikers FC	(United States) Don Ebert	(United States) Xavier Fuerte	(United States) Nike	Taco Bell
Chattanooga FC	(United States) Peter Fuller	(Spain) Juan Hernandez	(Denmark) Hummel	Volkswagen
Detroit City FC	(England) Trevor James	(Republic of Ireland) Stephen Carroll	(Germany) Adidas	Metro Detroit Chevy Dealers
Los Angeles Force	(Brazil) Thales Peterson	(United States) Joshua Culwell	(Denmark) Hummel	—
Michigan Stars FC	(Germany) Alexander Strehmel	(United States) Kyle Nuel	(Denmark) Hummel	HTC
Oakland Roots SC	(United States) Jordan Ferrell (Note: Ferrell was named head coach on December 3, replacing Paul Bravo.)	(Canada) Nana Attakora	(United States) Nike	Oaklandish
San Diego 1904 FC	(France) Alexandre Gontran	(United States) Ozzie Ramos	(United States) Nike	—
Stumptown Athletic	(United States) Mark Steffens	(United States) Tate Robertson	(Denmark) Hummel	—
Only played the Fall Season
Atlanta SC	(Brazil) Roberto Neves Filho	(Sierra Leone) Sheriff Suma	(Denmark) Hummel	—
Miami FC	(Scotland) Paul Dalglish	(United States) Dylan Mares	(Italy) Macron	—
Philadelphia Fury	(United States) Cris Vaccaro	(United States) Ian McGrath	(Denmark) Hummel	—

== Fall season ==
Miami FC and California United Strikers FC played seven matches while the rest of the league played only six. To accommodate for this, the Miami FC home match against Oakland Roots SC did not count in the standings for Miami and the second California United Strikers FC home match against San Diego 1904 FC did not count in the standings for Cal United.

=== Standings ===
==== East Coast standings ====
Pos	Team	Pld	W	D	L	GF	GA	GD	Pts	Qualification
1	Miami FC (O)	6	4	2	0	19	6	+13	14	East Coast Championship
2	Stumptown Athletic	6	4	0	2	13	7	+6	12	East Coast Championship
3	Atlanta SC	6	2	2	2	13	10	+3	8	
4	Philadelphia Fury	6	0	0	6	1	23	−22	0	Withdrew (Note: Philadelphia Fury withdrew after one match and forfeited their remaining matches)

Source: NISAofficial.com
(O) Play-off winners

==== West Coast standings ====
Pos	Team	Pld	W	D	L	GF	GA	GD	Pts	Qualification
1	Los Angeles Force	6	3	2	1	8	7	+1	11	West Coast Championship
2	California United Strikers FC (O)	6	2	3	1	13	9	+4	9	West Coast Championship
3	San Diego 1904 FC	6	2	0	4	9	15	−6	6	
4	Oakland Roots SC	6	0	3	3	10	13	−3	3	

Source: NISAofficial.com
(O) Play-off winners

=== Results ===
Home \ Away	ATL	MIA	PHI	STU	CAL	LAF	OAK	SDI	ATL	MIA	PHI	STU	CAL	LAF	OAK	SDI
Atlanta SC	—	2–2	3–0	1–3					—							
Miami FC	2–2	—	8–1	2–1			3–2			—						
Philadelphia Fury	0–3	0–3	—	0–3							—					
Stumptown Athletic	3–2	0–2	3–0	—								—				
California United Strikers FC					—	3–0	1–1	3–0					—			4–1
Los Angeles Force					2–2	—	1–0	2–0						—		
Oakland Roots SC					3–3	1–1	—								—	
San Diego 1904 FC					3–1	1–2	4–3	—								—

Updated to match(es) played on November 2, 2019. Source: NISAOfficial.com
Legend: Blue = home team win; Yellow = draw; Red = away team win.

=== Playoffs ===
The top two eastern teams will meet in the East Coast Championship while the top two western teams will meet in the West Coast Championship. Each champion will earn an automatic berth into the Spring 2020 playoffs.

November 9, 2019
7:00 p.m.

Miami FC	3–0	Stumptown Athletic
Martínez 28' (pen.); González 38'; Sam 45'; Heath (yellow card) 76'	Report; MyCujoo Broadcast	Campbell (yellow card) 90+'

Riccardo Silva Stadium, Miami, Florida
Attendance: 1,309
November 10, 2019
4:00 p.m.

Los Angeles Force	2–2 (a.e.t.)	California United Strikers FC
Vazquez (yellow card) 18'; Cardenas Jr. 61', (yellow card) 102'; Merlano 72'; Tanko (yellow card) 81'; Peterson (Coach) (yellow card) 86'; Moran (Ast. Coach) (yellow card) 86'	Report; MyCujoo Broadcast	Villalobos 21'; Capriotti (yellow card) 58'; Bryant 86'; Rincón (yellow card) 106'
Penalties
Charles (penalty missed); Muchiri (penalty scored); Ruiz (penalty scored); Tanko (penalty scored)	3–5	(penalty scored) Ocegueda; (penalty scored) Nuño; (penalty scored) Rincón; (penalty scored) Villalobos; (penalty scored) Salguero

Championship Soccer Stadium, Irvine, California
Attendance: 2,826
Referee: William Randy Hoffman

== Spring season ==
The 2020 Spring season began on February 28 and featured eight teams (five teams that also played in the Fall season, plus three new entries). It consisted of a single table instead of the conferences used during Fall. The top three teams would have qualified for the Playoffs, together with California United Strikers, already qualified because of their Fall season West Championship win.

The spring season was suspended on March 12, for 30 days, due to the coronavirus pandemic. The suspension was then extended in accordance with CDC guidelines and eventually made permanent on April 27, 2020.

=== Standings ===
Pos	Team	Pld	W	D	L	GF	GA	GD	Pts	Qualification
1	Oakland Roots SC	2	1	1	0	3	2	+1	4	Playoffs
2	California United Strikers FC (Q)	2	1	1	0	1	0	+1	4	Playoffs
3	Detroit City FC	1	1	0	0	2	0	+2	3	Playoffs
4	Stumptown Athletic	2	0	2	0	3	3	0	2	Playoffs
5	San Diego 1904 FC	2	0	2	0	2	2	0	2	
6	Chattanooga FC	1	0	1	0	1	1	0	1	
7	Los Angeles Force	2	0	1	1	1	3	−2	1	
8	Michigan Stars FC	2	0	0	2	1	3	−2	0	

Updated to match(es) played on March 8, 2020. Source: NISAofficial.com
(Q) Qualified for the phase indicated

=== Results ===
Home \ Away	CAL	CHA	DET	LAF	MIC	OAK	SAN	STU
California United Strikers FC	—	—	—	—	1–0	—	—	—
Chattanooga FC	—	—	—	—	—	—	—	—
Detroit City FC	—	—	—	—	—	—	—	—
Los Angeles Force	—	—	0–2	—	—	—	—	1–1
Michigan Stars FC	—	—	—	—	—	—	—	—
Oakland Roots SC	—	1–1	—	—	2–1	—	—	—
San Diego 1904 FC	0–0	—	—	—	—	—	—	—
Stumptown Athletic	—	—	—	—	—	—	2–2	—

Updated to match(es) played on March 6, 2020. Source: NISAOfficial.com
Legend: Blue = home team win; Yellow = draw; Red = away team win.

== See also ==
- National Independent Soccer Association
