= Mercy Mavericks =

Mercy University Mavericks
- University: Mercy University
- Nickname: Mavericks
- NCAA: Division II
- Conference: East Coast Conference
- Athletic director: Matt Kilcullen, Jr.
- Location: Dobbs Ferry, New York
- Varsity teams: 11
- Football stadium: Mercy Field - Turf field
- Basketball arena: Outdoor basketball courts
- Website: mercyathletics.com

The Mercy University Mavericks are the athletic teams that represents Mercy University located in Dobbs Ferry, New York, United States in intercollegiate sports as a member of the NCAA Division II ranks, primarily competing in the East Coast Conference.

== History ==
Mercy University Athletics was founded in 1950.

In 2024, Mercy University started enhancing its athletic fields on the Dobbs Ferry campus.

=== Nickname ===
In 2007, the university changed its athletic nickname from "Flyers" to "Mavericks" after the administration reviewed suggestions from students and faculty members.

== Varsity teams ==
Mercy University sponsors an intramural sports program, as well as intercollegiate competition in 10 varsity sports: Men's sports include baseball, basketball, lacrosse and soccer; while women's sports include basketball, field hockey, lacrosse, soccer, softball and volleyball. Men's volleyball will be added in the 2026–27 school year.

== Facilities ==
Mercy University's varied athletic facilities include:

- Victory Gym - (volleyball, men's and women's basketball)
- Mercy Field - Turf field (men's and women's soccer, women's field hockey, men's and women's lacrosse, men's baseball)
- Baseball field (connected to Mercy Field)
- Outdoor handball courts
- Smith Field (softball)
- Outdoor basketball courts
- Fitness center (in Hudson Hall)
- Tennis courts

== Achievements ==
In late 2023, Mercy University Athletics earned the NCAA Division II Presidents’ Award for Academic Excellence for the second year in a row. In 2024, Mercy University women's basketball headed to first NCAA Division II Tournament since 1985.

== Notable coaches ==
- Rick Wolff
- Frank Rodriguez

== Notable alumni ==
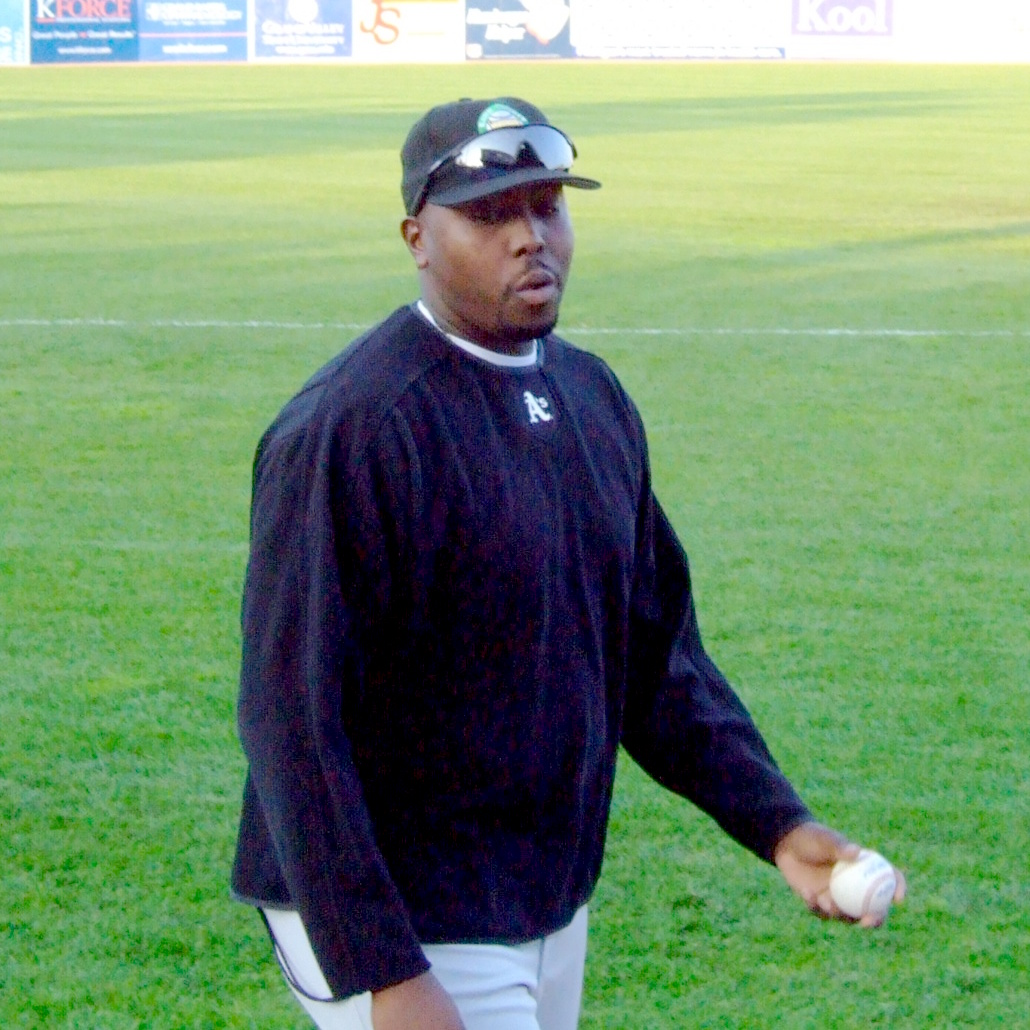
Alumnus Garvin Alston, an American professional baseball right-handed pitcher who played in Major League Baseball (MLB).

- Garvin Alston, retired American professional baseball right-handed pitcher who played in Major League Baseball (MLB)
- Dewey Bozella, former amateur boxer
- Laura Creavalle, professional female bodybuilder
- Rob DiToma, head baseball coach at Fairleigh Dickinson University.
- Simone Forbes, Jamaican sportswoman, having represented Jamaica in no less than five sports
- Stan Jefferson, former center and left fielder in Major League Baseball who played for the New York Mets among others
- Brian Sweeney, former MLB pitcher
- Wesley Walker, former NFL wide receiver
- Mookie Wilson, former MLB outfielder/ coach.
- Joel Serrano, Puerto Rican footballer
- Michael Collins, an American former professional soccer player who played as a midfielder. Collins played for at least twelve teams in nearly half a dozen leagues over his seventeen-year career. He also earned two caps with the United States national team in 1988. Collins currently serves as president and general manager of California United Strikers FC.
- Jude Flannery, an American triathlete who won six consecutive US national championships between 1991 and 1996. She died after a collision with a car while training in 1997.
- Mary Etchells, First and only woman to win the Star Worlds sailboat racing world championship.
