= Min-jae Kwak =

South Korean footballer (born 2000)

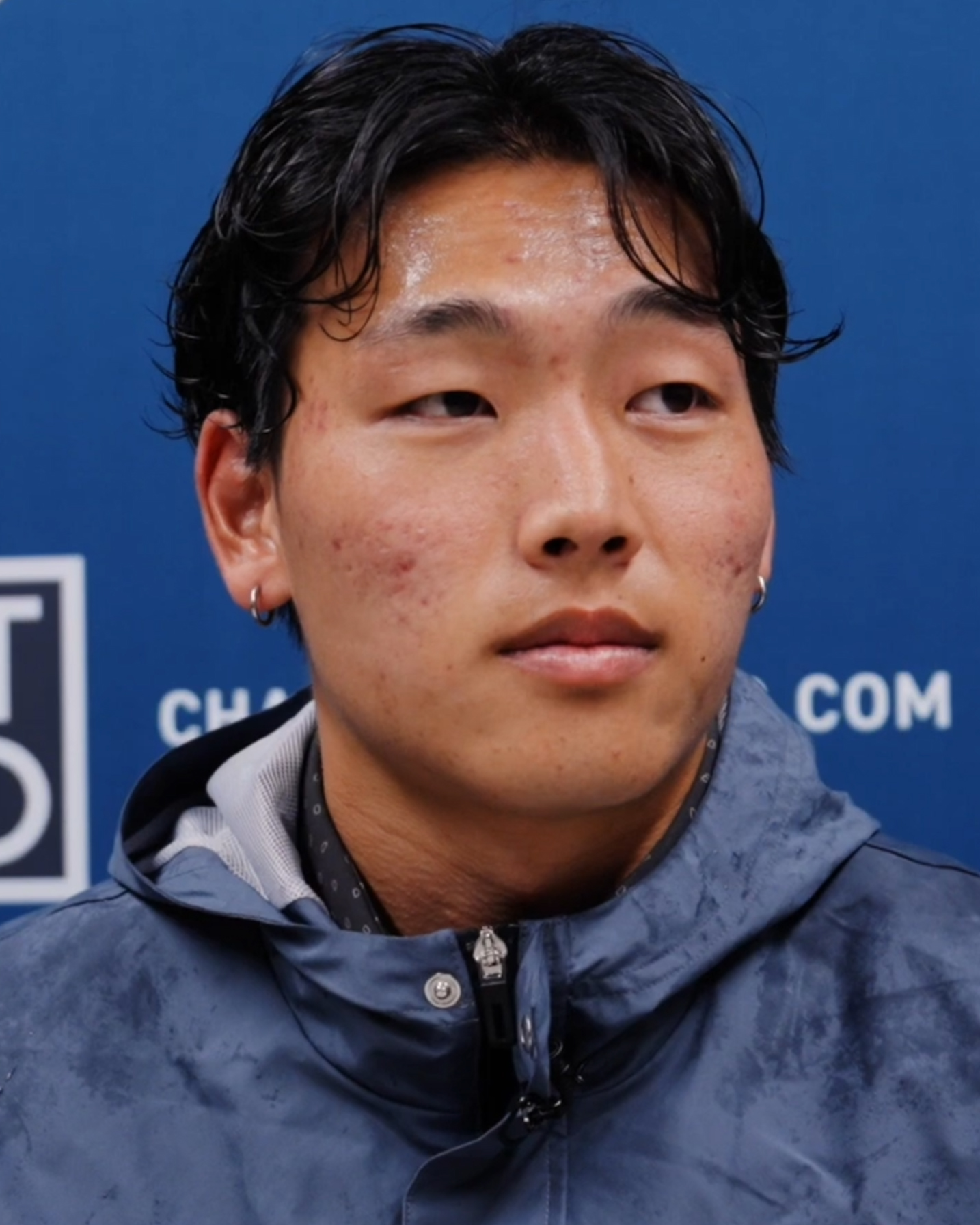
- Kwak in 2024

Personal information
- Date of birth: 25 August 2000 (age 26)
- Place of birth: Suwon, South Korea
- Height: 1.79 m (5 ft 10 1/2 in)
- Positions: Winger; left-back

Youth career
- South Bay Force
- 2012–2014: Strikers FC Academy
- 2015–2017: Pateadores Academy
- 2017–2018: Sporting Arsenal
- 2018–2019: Strikers FC Academy
- 2019–2020: HNK Gorica

Senior career*
Years	Team	Apps	(Gls)
2019	TNT FC		
2020–2021	California United Strikers FC	20	(4)
2022	AC Syracuse Pulse	20	(4)
2023	Vancouver FC	25	(1)
2024–2025	Chattanooga FC	15	(1)
- * Club domestic league appearances and goals as of September 29, 2024

Min-jae Kwak (Korean: 곽민재, born 25 August 2000) is a South Korean footballer.

== Early life ==
Born in South Korea, Kwak lived in Fiji for eight months, before moving to the United States at age 12, moving to Orange County, California. Shortly after arriving in the United States, he was invited to trial with the LA Galaxy academy, but did not make the program. He began playing with South Bay Force before moving to the Strikers FC Academy, before moving to Pateadores Academy, Sporting Arsenal, before returning to Strikers Academy.

In September 2019, he joined the youth side of Croatian club HNK Gorica, after having participated in a camp for South Korean players with the club. He scored in an exhibition game with the first team against Lekenik FC.

== Club career ==
In 2019, he played with South Korean side TNT FC.

In September 2020, he signed with National Independent Soccer Association club California United Strikers FC, after having trained with the club since January. In March 2022, he joined another NISA club, AC Syracuse Pulse. That season, he was named to the NISA Best XI, after having scored four goals and adding an assist.

In March 2023, he signed with Vancouver FC in the Canadian Premier League, becoming the second Korean-born player to play in the CPL. With Vancouver, he was converted by head coach Afshin Ghotbi, who was an assistant coach with the South Korea national team at the 2002 and 2006 FIFA World Cups, to play left-back. In May 2023, he was named to the CPL Team of the Week for the first time, after helping his team earn a clean sheet in their match that week. He scored his first goal on June 2 against Pacific FC.

In March 2024, he signed with Chattanooga FC in MLS Next Pro. On September 21, 2024, he scored his first goal for the club, in a match against New England Revolution II, which earned MLS Next Pro Goal of the Matchweek honours. After the season, he re-signed with the club for the 2025 season, with an option for another season.

== Career statistics ==
As of match played September 29, 2024

Club	Season	League			Playoffs		National Cup		Other		Total	
Club	Season	Division	Apps	Goals	Apps	Goals	Apps	Goals	Apps	Goals	Apps	Goals
California United Strikers FC	2020–21	NISA	3	0	—		—		3 (Note: Appearances in the NISA Legends Cup)	0	6	0
California United Strikers FC	2021	NISA	17	4	—		—		?	?	17	4
California United Strikers FC	Total		20	4	0	0	0	0	3	0	23	4
AC Syracuse Pulse	2022	NISA	20	4	1	0	1	0	—		22	4
Vancouver FC	2023	Canadian Premier League	25	1	—		1	0	—		26	1
Chattanooga FC	2024	MLS Next Pro	15	1	—		0	0	—		15	1
Career total			80	10	1	0	2	0	3	0	86	10
