= Beto Navarro =

American soccer player

Personal information
- Full name: Alberto Navarro
- Date of birth: March 25, 1989 (age 37)
- Place of birth: Delano, California, United States
- Height: 1.86 m (6 ft 1 in)
- Position: Defender

College career
Years	Team	Apps	(Gls)
2007–2010	Cal State Bakersfield Roadrunners		

Senior career*
Years	Team	Apps	(Gls)
2012	Fresno Fuego	9	(0)
2012	Cal FC		
2012–2014	Atlanta Silverbacks	36	(1)
2014	FC Edmonton	18	(0)
2015	Orange County Blues	23	(0)
2016	Jacksonville Armada	11	(0)
2017	Orange County SC	12	(0)
2018	Fresno FC	6	(0)
2019–2020	California United Strikers	4	(0)

Managerial career
- 2019–: California United Strikers (assistant)
- * Club domestic league appearances and goals as of February 14, 2021

Alberto "Beto" Navarro (born March 25, 1989) is an American soccer player. He currently serves on the coaching staff for California United Strikers FC in the National Independent Soccer Association.

== Career ==
In 2012, Navarro was a part of Cal FC's improbable U.S. Open Cup run that saw them defeat the USL's Wilmington Hammerheads and Major League Soccer's Portland Timbers before falling to Seattle Sounders FC in the fourth round. Navarro followed coach Eric Wynalda to Atlanta to join the NASL's Atlanta Silverbacks soon after.

Navarro returned to his native California for the 2015 USL season, joining the Orange County Blues.

On December 17, 2015, Navarro re-joined the NASL by signing a contract with Jacksonville Armada FC.

On August 13, 2019, Navarro signed with California United Strikers FC ahead of its inaugural season in the National Independent Soccer Association.

== Honors ==
Atlanta Silverbacks FC
Spring Season Champions: 2013

Orange County Blues FC
USL Team of the Week: 2015 Week 22
Western Conference Regular Season Champions: 2015

California United Strikers FC
West Coast Conference Champions: 2019
