= Evan Waldrep =

American professional soccer player (born 1997)

Personal information
- Date of birth: 8 May 1997 (age 29)
- Place of birth: Phoenix, Arizona, United States
- Height: 1.80 m (5 ft 11 in)
- Position: Midfielder

Team information
- Current team: Kajaanin Haka
- Number: 25

Youth career
- 2013–2014: Real Salt Lake Academy

College career
Years	Team	Apps	(Gls)
2015–2016	Creighton Bluejays	26	(2)
2017	Grand Canyon Antelopes	5	(0)

Senior career*
Years	Team	Apps	(Gls)
2016	FC Tucson	11	(0)
2018	Phoenix Rising	13	(0)
2019–2021	California United Strikers	19	(0)
2022	AC Syracuse Pulse	20	(0)
2023	Hume City FC	7	(0)
2024-2026	CE Carroi	27	(7)
2026	Kajaanin Haka	5	(2)

International career^{‡}
2014-2016	United States U20	5	(0)
- * Club domestic league appearances and goals as of April 14, 2022 ‡ National team caps and goals as of February 14, 2018

Evan Waldrep (born May 8, 1997) is an American professional soccer player who plays as a midfielder for Kajaanin Haka in the Kolmonen.

== Career ==
=== College ===
Waldrep played at Creighton University in his freshmen and sophomore years and then transferred to Grand Canyon University for the 2017 season. He was named one of the top three Division I "impact transfers" by Top Drawer Soccer.

=== Professional ===
Waldrep was signed by Phoenix Rising FC on February 14, 2018. He also played for FC Tucson of the Premier Development League in 2016.

On August 12, 2019, California United Strikers FC announced they had signed Waldrep ahead of their inaugural season in the National Independent Soccer Association. He played in each of the team's regular season games during the fall and started in the West Coast Championship against Los Angeles Force which his team won via penalty kicks.
