= Abraham Villon =

American professional soccer player (born 1990)

Personal information
- Date of birth: March 13, 1990 (age 36)
- Place of birth: Garden Grove, California, United States
- Height: 1.65 m (5 ft 5 in)
- Position: Midfielder

College career
Years	Team	Apps	(Gls)
2009–2010	Arizona Western Matadors		
2011–2013	San Diego State Aztecs		

Senior career*
Years	Team	Apps	(Gls)
2009	Orange County Blue Star	1	(0)
2010–2011	Ventura County Fusion	9	(0)
2012–2013	Thunder Bay Chill	23	(3)
2014	Oklahoma City Energy	23	(0)
2017	Thunder Bay Chill	13	(4)
2017	California United FC II	17	(2)
2019–2020	California United Strikers	9	(0)
2021–	Los Angeles Force	2	(0)

International career
- United States U15
- United States U16
- United States U17
- United States U18
- * Club domestic league appearances and goals as of April 19, 2021

Abraham Villon (born March 13, 1990) is an American professional soccer player who played as a midfielder for Los Angeles Force in the National Independent Soccer Association.

== Career ==
=== Early career ===
Villon played college soccer at Arizona Western College and San Diego State University between 2009 and 2013. While at college he also appeared for USL PDL clubs Orange County Blue Star in 2009, Ventura County Fusion in 2010 and 2011 and Thunder Bay Chill in 2012 and 2013.

=== Professional ===
Villon signed his first professional contract with USL Pro club Oklahoma City Energy on April 5, 2014.

In 2017, Villon signed with the Thunder Bay Chill in the Premier Development League. Following that season in October, Villon returned to Southern California where he joined California United FC II and was a leading contributor to the clubs 2018 United Premier Soccer League's Fall Season National Championship team, being named the 2018 Fall Season Most Valuable Player.

In August 2019, Villon was signed by United's professional team, California United Strikers FC, ahead of its inaugural season in the National Independent Soccer Association.

In December 2020, Villon joined Los Angeles Force ahead of the 2021 season.
