= Michael Bryant (soccer) =

American soccer player (born 1995)

Personal information
- Date of birth: April 2, 1995 (age 31)
- Place of birth: Portola Hills, California, United States
- Height: 1.86 m (6 ft 1 in)
- Positions: Defensive midfielder; defender

Team information
- Current team: Detroit City
- Number: 12

Youth career
- Pateadores
- OC Kings
- Pateadores
- United FC

College career
Years	Team	Apps	(Gls)
2013–2016	Elmira Soaring Eagles	49	(31)
2017	Northwest Nazarene Nighthawks	15	(4)

Senior career*
Years	Team	Apps	(Gls)
2017–2019	Orange County FC	30	(6)
2019–2021	California United Strikers	39	(2)
2022–	Detroit City	133	(9)
- * Club domestic league appearances and goals as of November 4, 2026

Michael Bryant (born April 2, 1995) is an American soccer player who plays as a defensive midfielder or defender for Detroit City in the USL Championship.

== Career ==
=== College and amateur ===
Bryant played college soccer at Elmira College in 2013, where he played three seasons for the Soaring Eagles – missing the 2014 season. In 2017, Bryant transferred to Northwest Nazarene University in Idaho to play his final college season.

=== Professional ===
Following college, Bryant captained NPSL side Orange County FC in 2017, 2018 and 2019.

In September 2019, Bryant signed for NISA side California United Strikers ahead of the league's inaugural season. He appeared in six of the team's regular season games during the Fall 2019 season and scored his first goal on October 20 against San Diego 1904 FC. In the West Coast Championship against Los Angeles Force on November 10, Bryant scored the game tying goal 86th minute to send the game to overtime which United eventually won in a penalty kick shootout.

In February 2022, Bryant signed with USL Championship side Detroit City FC. He helped DCFC reach the playoffs in '22, winning their first-ever USL Championship playoff game in '23 when they knocked off top-seeded Pittsburgh Riverhounds SC in Pittsburgh 1–0. On September 14, 2024, Bryant played his 100th game for the club, becoming the club's fifth city centurion in club history.

== Career statistics ==
As of match played March 8, 2020

Appearances and goals by club, season and competition
Club	Season	League			National cup (Note: Includes appearances in U.S. Open Cup.)		Other		Total	
Club	Season	Division	Apps	Goals	Apps	Goals	Apps	Goals	Apps	Goals
Orange County FC	2017	NPSL	15	1	0	0	3	1	18	2
Orange County FC	2018	NPSL	11	1	2	0	3	1	16	2
Orange County FC	2019	NPSL	14	4	4	0	0	0	18	4
Orange County FC	Total		30	6	6	0	6	2	42	8
California United Strikers FC	2019–20	NISA	8	1	0	0	1	1	9	2
Detroit City FC	2022	USLC	31	4						
Detroit City FC	2023	USLC	34	2						
Career total			38	7	6	0	7	3	51	10
