= Adan Coronado =

American professional soccer player

Personal information
- Full name: Adan Martin Coronado
- Date of birth: April 20, 1990 (age 36)
- Place of birth: United States
- Positions: Defender; midfielder; winger; forward

Senior career*
Years	Team	Apps	(Gls)
2011	Santa Ana Winds FC		
2011–2012	Kickers Emden		
2011–2012	FK Kom		
2012–2013	HNK Branitelj		
2013–2014	TSV Ottersberg		
2015–2016	BSV Schwarz-Weiß Rehden II		
2015–2017	AZAL	26	(0)
2017	Santa Ana Winds FC		
2019–2020	California United Strikers FC	4	(0)
- * Club domestic league appearances and goals as of September 29, 2020

Adan Martin Coronado (born April 20, 1990, in the United States) is an American Professional soccer player.

== Career ==
In 2011, instead of playing college soccer, Coronado paid to take part in a soccer combine, earning a trip to Germany where the players who made the cut would be scouted by German lower-league sides. Subsequently, he signed for Kickers Emden in the German third division, but they were eventually placed in the fifth division due to financial problems.

After playing in the Montenegrin and Bosnian second divisions, Coronado signed for AZAL in Azerbaijan, where they filmed him and wanted to know about his culture.
