= Chris Klute =

American soccer player (born 1990)

Personal information
- Full name: Christopher Klute
- Date of birth: March 5, 1990 (age 36)
- Place of birth: Grand Prairie, Texas, United States
- Height: 1.86 m (6 ft 1 in)
- Position: Defender

Youth career
- 2004–2008: Dallas Texans
- 2007: IMG Soccer Academy

College career
Years	Team	Apps	(Gls)
2008	Furman Paladins	19	(0)
2011	Clayton State Lakers	18	(0)

Senior career*
Years	Team	Apps	(Gls)
2011–2012	Atlanta Silverbacks Reserves		
2012–2013	Atlanta Silverbacks	12	(0)
2012–2013	→ Colorado Rapids (loan)	18	(0)
2013–2014	Colorado Rapids	39	(0)
2015	Columbus Crew SC	14	(0)
2016	Portland Timbers	8	(0)
2016	→ Portland Timbers 2 (loan)	5	(0)
2016	→ Minnesota United (loan)	2	(0)
2017–2019	California United FC II	21	(3)
2019–2021	California United Strikers	15	(2)

International career^{‡}
2007	United States U17	7	(0)
2007	United States U20	2	(0)
- * Club domestic league appearances and goals as of April 13, 2021 ‡ National team caps and goals as of October 21, 2012

Christopher Klute (born March 5, 1990) is an American former soccer player who played as a defender.

== Club ==
=== Atlanta Silverbacks ===
Klute played one season with both Furman University and Clayton State and spent time with the U.S. U-17s before moving to the Atlanta Silverbacks Reserves in 2011. Interim coach Alex Pineda Chacón called him up to the Silverbacks first team in June 2012.

=== Colorado Rapids ===
New head coach Brian Haynes loaned him to Colorado Rapids for the 2013 Major League Soccer season. Colorado purchased him outright in July 2013.

=== Columbus Crew SC ===
In January 2015 Klute was traded by Colorado to Columbus Crew SC.

=== Portland Timbers ===
Klute was traded by Columbus to Portland Timbers in exchange for allocation money on December 11, 2015.

=== Minnesota United ===
Klute was loaned to Minnesota United FC on September 7, 2016.

=== California United FC II ===
Klute joined California United in February 2017 and was a key member of the team which captured both the 2017 Spring & Fall Season United Premier Soccer League National Championships.

=== California United Strikers FC ===
In August 2019, Klute was signed to the Strikers professional side, California United Strikers FC, in the National Independent Soccer Association ahead of its first season. He appeared in all seven of the team's fall regular season games and in the West Coast Championship in November, which the team won over Los Angeles Force in a penalty kick shootout.

== International ==
He was called up to the United States national team for a January 2014 camp, although he never made an appearance.
