= Kevin Garcia-Lopez =

American soccer player (born 1992)

Personal information
- Full name: Kevin Roberto Garcia-Lopez
- Date of birth: August 29, 1992 (age 34)
- Place of birth: West Los Angeles, California, United States
- Height: 1.68 m (5 ft 6 in)
- Position: Defender

College career
Years	Team	Apps	(Gls)
2010–2013	UC Santa Barbara Gauchos	36	(2)

Senior career*
Years	Team	Apps	(Gls)
2015	Ventura County Fusion		
2016–2017	L.A. Wolves		
2018	California United II		
2019	Las Vegas Lights	26	(0)
2020	California United Strikers	4	(0)
2022	California United Strikers	16	(0)
- * Club domestic league appearances and goals as of 1 April 2023

Kevin Roberto Garcia-Lopez (born August 29, 1992) is an American soccer player who plays as a defender.

== Club career ==
=== Las Vegas Lights FC ===
On January 9, 2019, Garcia-Lopez was announced as a new addition to the Las Vegas Lights' roster ahead of the teams 2019 season. This was his first professional soccer contract. He appeared in 26 games for the Lights and started in each one.

=== California United Strikers FC ===
In February 2020, Garcia-Lopez was signed by National Independent Soccer Association side California United Strikers FC.
