= Christian Thierjung =

American soccer player

Personal information
- Date of birth: January 5, 1995 (age 31)
- Place of birth: Dove Canyon, California, United States
- Height: 1.80 m (5 ft 11 in)
- Position: Winger

College career
Years	Team	Apps	(Gls)
2013–2016	California Golden Bears	73	(27)

Senior career*
Years	Team	Apps	(Gls)
2014–2015	Orange County Blues U-23	11	(1)
2015	PSA Elite		
2016	Burlingame Dragons	3	(0)
2017	New York Cosmos B	9	(4)
2017	Tulsa Roughnecks	16	(4)
2018	Reno 1868	1	(0)
2018	Tulsa Roughnecks	4	(0)
2019–2022	California United Strikers	54	(17)
- * Club domestic league appearances and goals as of August 11, 2024

Christian Thierjung (born January 5, 1995) is an American soccer player who plays for California United Strikers in the National Independent Soccer Association.

== Career ==
=== College career ===
Thierjung played four years of college soccer at the University of California, Berkeley between 2013 and 2016.

While at college, Thierjung appeared for Premier Development League sides OC Pateadores Blues and Burlingame Dragons.

=== Professional career ===
On January 17, 2017, Thierjung was selected in the third round (50th overall) of the 2017 MLS SuperDraft by San Jose Earthquakes. However, he wasn't signed by the club.

In April 2017, Thierjung signed with National Premier Soccer League side New York Cosmos B. He moved to United Soccer League's Tulsa Roughnecks on July 21, 2017. He made his debut for the Roughnecks on July 22, 2017, as an 80th-minute substitute against Phoenix Rising FC, and scored in the 85th minute to give them a 3–0 victory.

On December 21, 2017, it was announced that Thierjung would move to Reno 1868 FC ahead of their 2018 season.
