= Juan Pablo Ocegueda =

American soccer player (born 1993)

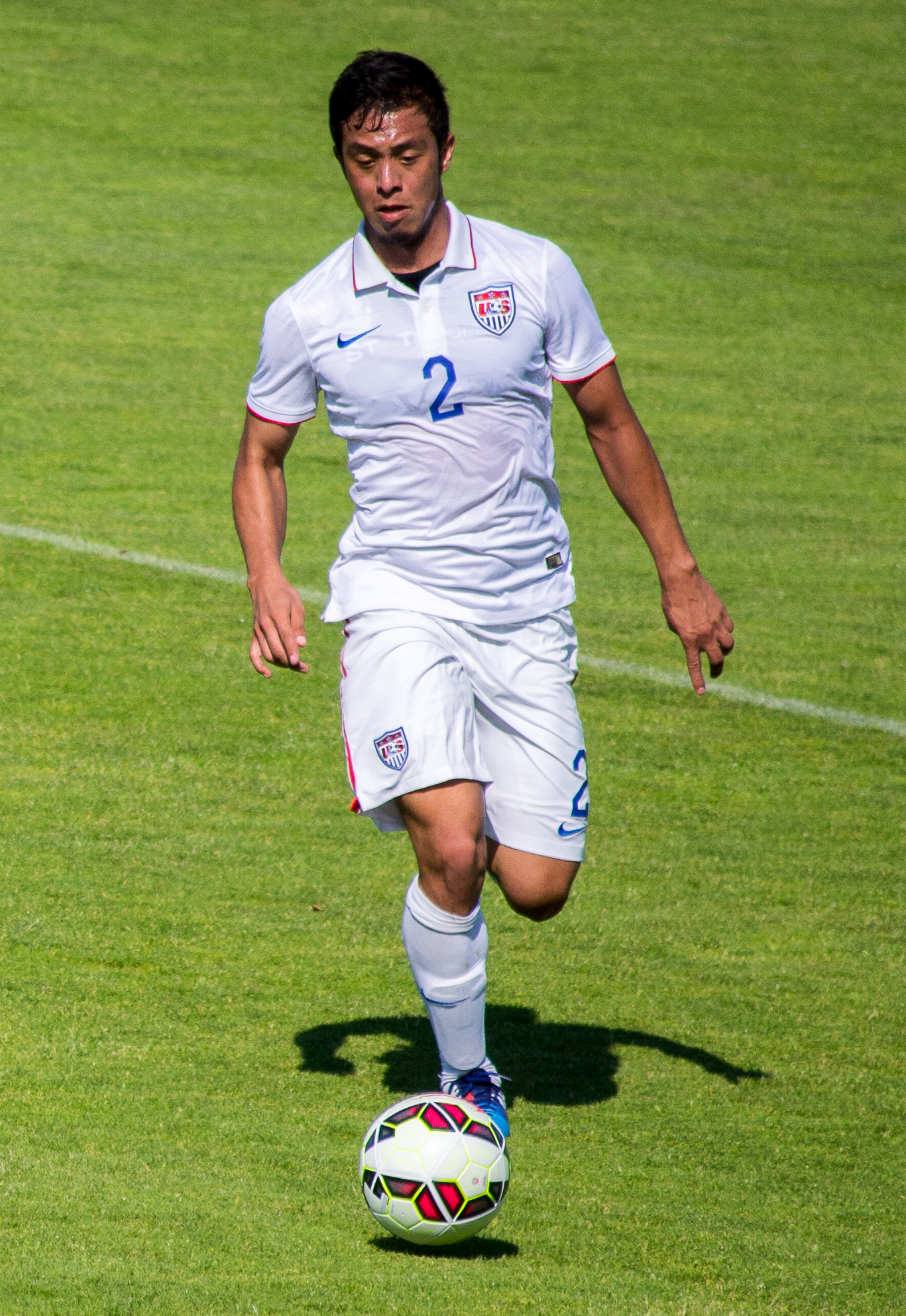
- Ocegueda with the United States U23 at the 2015 Toulon Tournament

Personal information
- Full name: Juan Pablo Ocegueda de Alba
- Date of birth: July 13, 1993 (age 33)
- Place of birth: Orange County, California, United States
- Height: 5 ft 11 in (1.80 m)
- Position: Left-back

Youth career
- 2008–2012: UANL
- 2013: → Guadalajara (loan)

Senior career*
Years	Team	Apps	(Gls)
2014–2017	UANL	0	(0)
2014–2016	→ Oaxaca (loan)	44	(0)
2017	→ Orange County SC (loan)	19	(0)
2018–2019	California United II	6	(1)
2019–2020	California United Strikers	3	(0)
2021–2022	Los Angeles Force	17	(0)

International career^{‡}
2011	United States U18	3	(0)
2012–2013	United States U20	20	(0)
2014–2015	United States U23	4	(0)
Medal record
Representing United States
Runner-up	CONCACAF U-20 Championship	2013
- * Club domestic league appearances and goals as of November 9, 2023 ‡ National team caps and goals as of April 23, 2015

Juan Pablo Ocegueda de Alba (born July 13, 1993) is an American former professional soccer player. He previously played in the UANL academy, Oaxaca, Orange County SC, Sahuayo F.C, and California United Strikers.

== Club career ==
Ocegueda spent the bulk of his youth career in Tigres' academy. In July 2013, he was loaned to Chivas for the Apertura season, but he did not play for the club's first team.

Back with Tigres, Ocegueda made his professional debut on March 13, 2014, in a Copa MX match against Puebla.

== International career ==
Ocegueda played for the US under-20 national team in the 2013 CONCACAF U-20 Championship and the 2013 FIFA U-20 World Cup. Ocegueda announced he would no longer play for the U.S. after joining Chivas, who have a strict Mexican-only policy. However, Ocegueda left Chivas after just half a season when his loan to the club expired.
