= Gustavo Villalobos =

American soccer player (born 1991)

Personal information
- Full name: Gustavo Villalobos Carbajal
- Date of birth: November 19, 1991 (age 34)
- Place of birth: North Hills, California, United States
- Height: 1.78 m (5 ft 10 in)
- Position: Forward

Youth career
- LA Galaxy

College career
Years	Team	Apps	(Gls)
2010	Cal State Northridge Matadors	18	(2)

Senior career*
Years	Team	Apps	(Gls)
2013	FC Hasental	19	(14)
2014	Ånge IF 2	1	(2)
2014	Ånge IF	12	(2)
2014	Jönköpings Södra IF U21	1	(0)
2014–2015	Qormi	10	(1)
2015–2016	Pembroke Athleta	31	(14)
2016	Tulsa Roughnecks	18	(1)
2017	Orange County SC	25	(2)
2018	California United FC II	11	(5)
2019	FC Golden State Force	3	(4)
2019	FC Golden State	12	(10)
2019–2022	California United Strikers	25	(5)
2023	Los Angeles Force	3	(1)
- * Club domestic league appearances and goals as of October 17, 2024

Gustavo Villalobos (born November 19, 1991) is an American soccer player.

== Career ==
=== College and amateur ===
Villalobos started his college career at Cal State Northridge in 2010, having sat out 2009 as a red-shirted year. However, he suffered the fourth leg break of his career in 2011, putting him out injured for over 15 months.

After an extended period out of the game, Villalobos signed with the fourth-tier National Premier Soccer League side FC Hasental in 2013.

=== Professional ===
After a year with the Swedish side Ånge IF in 2014, Villalobos signed with the Maltese Premier League team Qormi in 2015, but then moved to another Maltese Premier League team, Pembroke Athleta, where he finished as the club's top goalscorer.

Villalobos returned to the United States in May 2016, signing with the United Soccer League side Tulsa Roughnecks. In 2017, Villalobos returned to his home state of California signing with Orange County Soccer Club.

In August 2019, Villalobos returned to professional soccer when he signed with National Independent Soccer Association side California United Strikers FC ahead of the team's inaugural season. He made his debut in the team's first match against Oakland Roots SC, starting the game and scoring the Strikers' second goal on route to a comeback 3–3 draw. On November 10, he started in the West Coast Championship against the Los Angeles Force and scored his team's opening goal. During the subsequent penalty kick shootout Villalobos was successful in his team's penultimate attempt and went on to win the title.
