= Michael Collins (soccer) =

American soccer player (born 1961)

Personal information
- Full name: Michael Christopher Collins
- Date of birth: November 17, 1961 (age 64)
- Place of birth: Hicksville, New York, United States
- Height: 5 ft 10 in (1.78 m)
- Position: Midfielder

Youth career
- –1979: Hicksville Americans

College career
Years	Team	Apps	(Gls)
1979	Mercy Mavericks		

Senior career*
Years	Team	Apps	(Gls)
1980–1981	New York United		
1980–1981	Atlanta Chiefs (indoor)	6	(0)
1981	Pennsylvania Stoners		
1981–1984	New York Arrows (indoor)	86	(22)
1984	New York Nationals		
1984–1985	Baltimore Blast (indoor)	64	(19)
1986–1987	New York Express (indoor)	31	(11)
1987–1989	Los Angeles Lazers (indoor)	115	(67)
1989–1990	St. Louis Storm (indoor)	39	(17)
1991–1992	San Diego Sockers (indoor)	42	(6)
1992–1993	Milwaukee Wave (indoor)	26	(15)
1994	Milwaukee Rampage		
1994–1995	Buffalo Blizzard (indoor)	40	(29)
1995	Seattle SeaDogs (indoor)	27	(24)
1996	Sacramento Knights (indoor)	28	(11)
1996–1997	Buffalo Blizzard (indoor)	22	(7)
1997	Detroit Safari (indoor)	22	(8)

International career
1988	United States	2	(0)
- * Club domestic league appearances and goals

Michael Collins (born in Hicksville, New York) is an American former professional soccer player who played as a midfielder. Collins played for at least twelve teams in nearly half a dozen leagues over his seventeen-year career. He also earned two caps with the United States national team in 1988. Collins currently serves as president and general manager of California United Strikers FC.

== Youth and college ==
Collins grew up in Hicksville, New York where he played on the Hicksville Americans youth club. In 1979, the Americans went to the McGuire Cup final where it lost to Imo's Pizza of St. Louis, Missouri. Collins also played soccer at St. John the Baptist Diocesan High School in West Islip, New York. Following his graduation of St. John's in 1979, he spent the fall semester playing college soccer at Mercy College before turning professional.

== Professional career ==
In January 1980, Collins signed with the New York United of the American Soccer League. He spent two seasons with the team, seeing very little playing time, before the team folded at the end of the 1981 season. Collins moved to the New York Arrows of Major Indoor Soccer League (MISL). He made his playing debut on December 3, 1981, and remained with the Arrows until they folded following the 1983–1984 season. In 1984, he signed with the New York Nationals of the United Soccer League. The Nationals folded at the end of the season. That winter, he returned to MISL, this time with the Baltimore Blast. The Blast went to the championship series before losing to the San Diego Sockers. Collins left the Blast and signed with the expansion New York Express on August 27, 1986. The Express went 3–23 before folding during the season. On March 4, 1987, the Los Angeles Lazers purchased Collins’ contract from the Express. The Lazers folded in 1989. He played at least the 1991-1992 MISL season with the San Diego Sockers. On January 9, 1993, the Milwaukee Wave of the National Professional Soccer League signed Collins for the remainder of the 1992–1993 season. He then moved to the Milwaukee Rampage for the 1994 USISL. That winter, Collins signed with the Buffalo Blizzard (NPSL) for the 1994–1995 season. At the end of the season, he moved to the Seattle SeaDogs for the 1995 Continental Indoor Soccer League (CISL) season. In 1996, he played with the Sacramento Knights of the CISL. That winter, he was back with the Buffalo Blizzard, then played with the Detroit Safari for the 1997 CISL season.

== National team ==
Collins earned two caps with the U.S. national team in 1988. His first game cap was a 3–0 loss to Chile on June 5, 1988. He came off for Chris Sullivan. His second game was a 1–0 loss to Ecuador on June 7, 1988.
