= Miguel Sánchez (Mexican footballer) =

Mexican footballer (born 1988)

Personal information
- Full name: Miguel Sánchez Rincón
- Date of birth: 10 August 1988 (age 38)
- Place of birth: Morelia, Mexico
- Height: 1.82 m (5 ft 11 1/2 in)
- Position: Forward

Youth career
- Chivas USA

Senior career*
Years	Team	Apps	(Gls)
2007–2010	Chiapas	2	(0)
2007	→ Jaguares C	9	(0)
2008–2009	→ Jaguares B	8	(0)
2010–2011	→ Cruz Azul Hidalgo (loan)	9	(0)
2011–2013	Anaheim Bolts (indoor)	25	(16)
2014–2015	Ontario Fury (indoor)	20	(8)
2016–2018	LA Wolves		
2018–2019	California United FC II		
2019–2020	California United Strikers	8	(0)
- * Club domestic league appearances and goals as of September 29, 2020

Miguel Sánchez Rincón (born 10 August 1988) is a Mexican footballer.

On 19 April 2009 Sánchez played in his first Primera Division de Mexico match for Jaguares against Toluca.
