= Great Park (Irvine) =

Public park in Irvine, California

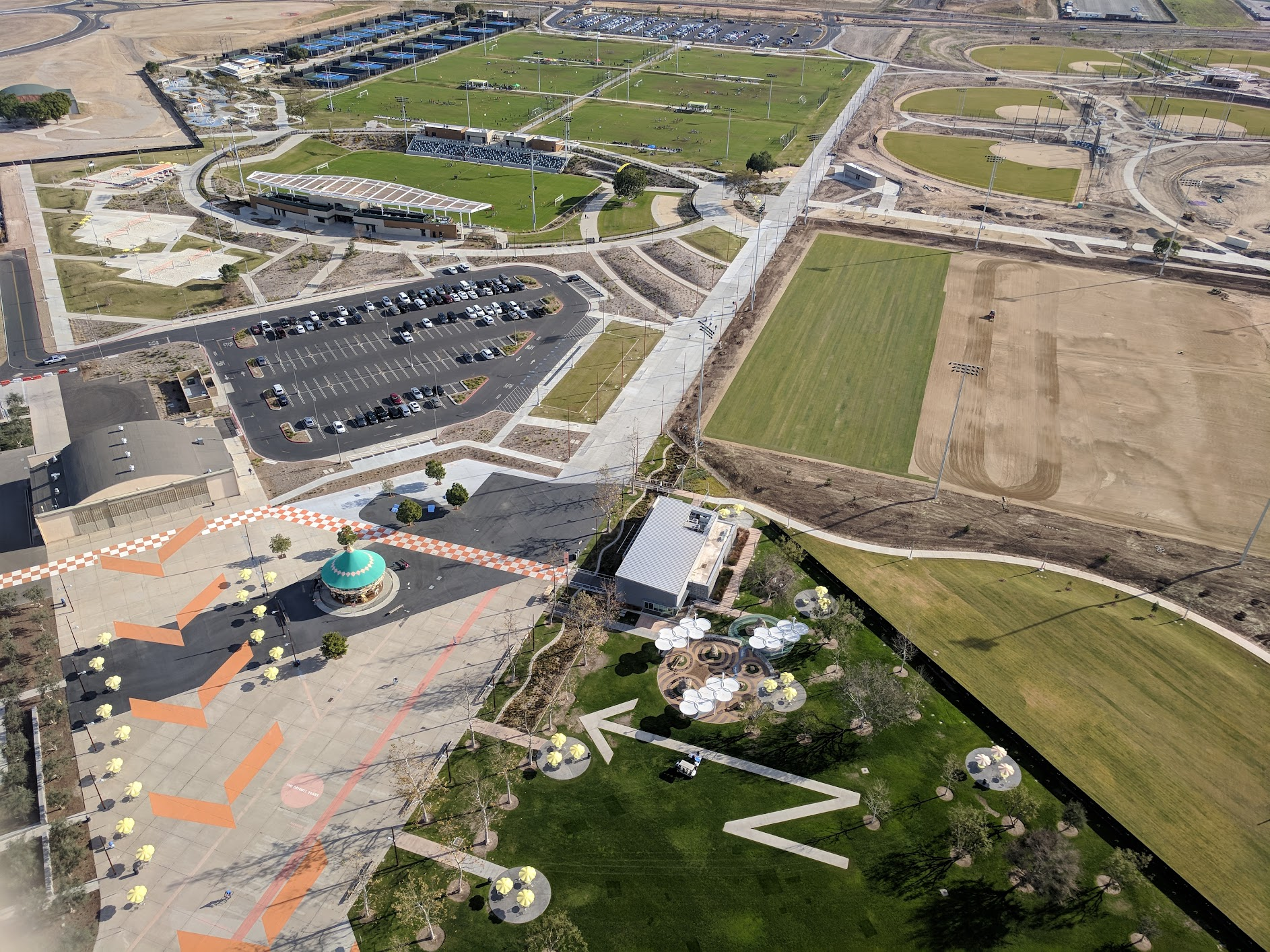
- Part of the Great Park as seen from the Great Park Balloon in 2018
- Interactive map of Great Park
- Type: Regional park
- Location: Irvine, California
- Coordinates: 33.67°N 117.73°W
- Area: 500 acres (200 ha) (eventually 1,347 acres (545 ha))
- Created: July 14, 2007
- Operator: Great Park Corporation, city of Irvine
- Status: Open, under development and delays
- Public transit: Irvine Transportation Center
- Website: cityofirvine.org/great-park

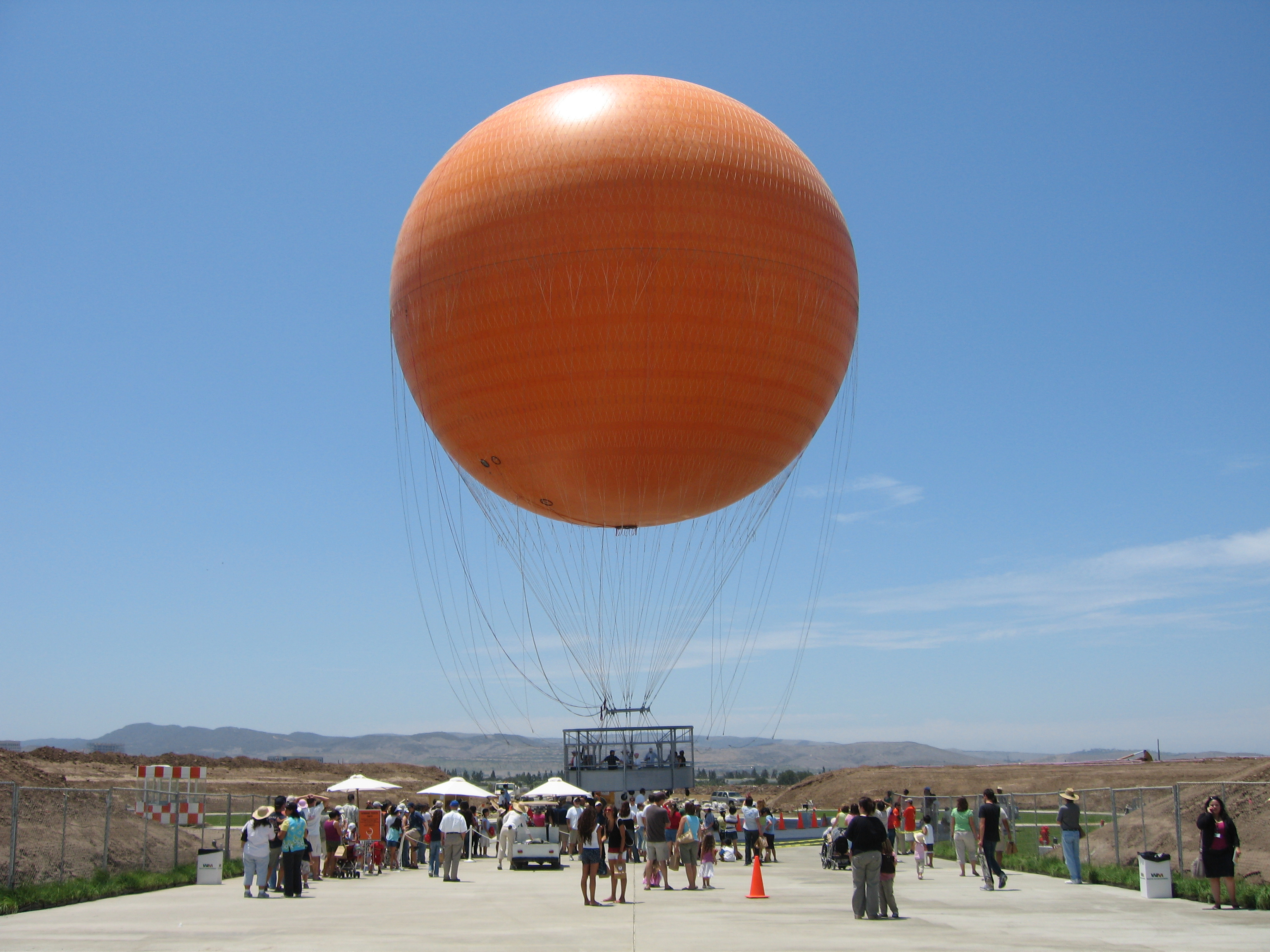
The balloon ride was the first attraction to open at the Great Park

The Great Park (formerly Orange County Great Park) is a public park in Irvine, California, with a focus on sports, agriculture and the arts. It is a non-aviation reuse of the decommissioned Marine Corps Air Station (MCAS) El Toro. The Orange County park comprises 28.8% of the total area that once made up the air base. The project was approved by the voters of Orange County in 2002 at $1.1 billion.

== History ==
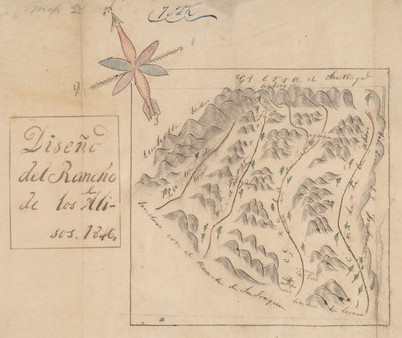
Great Park stands on land originally part of Rancho Cañada de los Alisos, granted in 1842 to José Antonio Serrano.

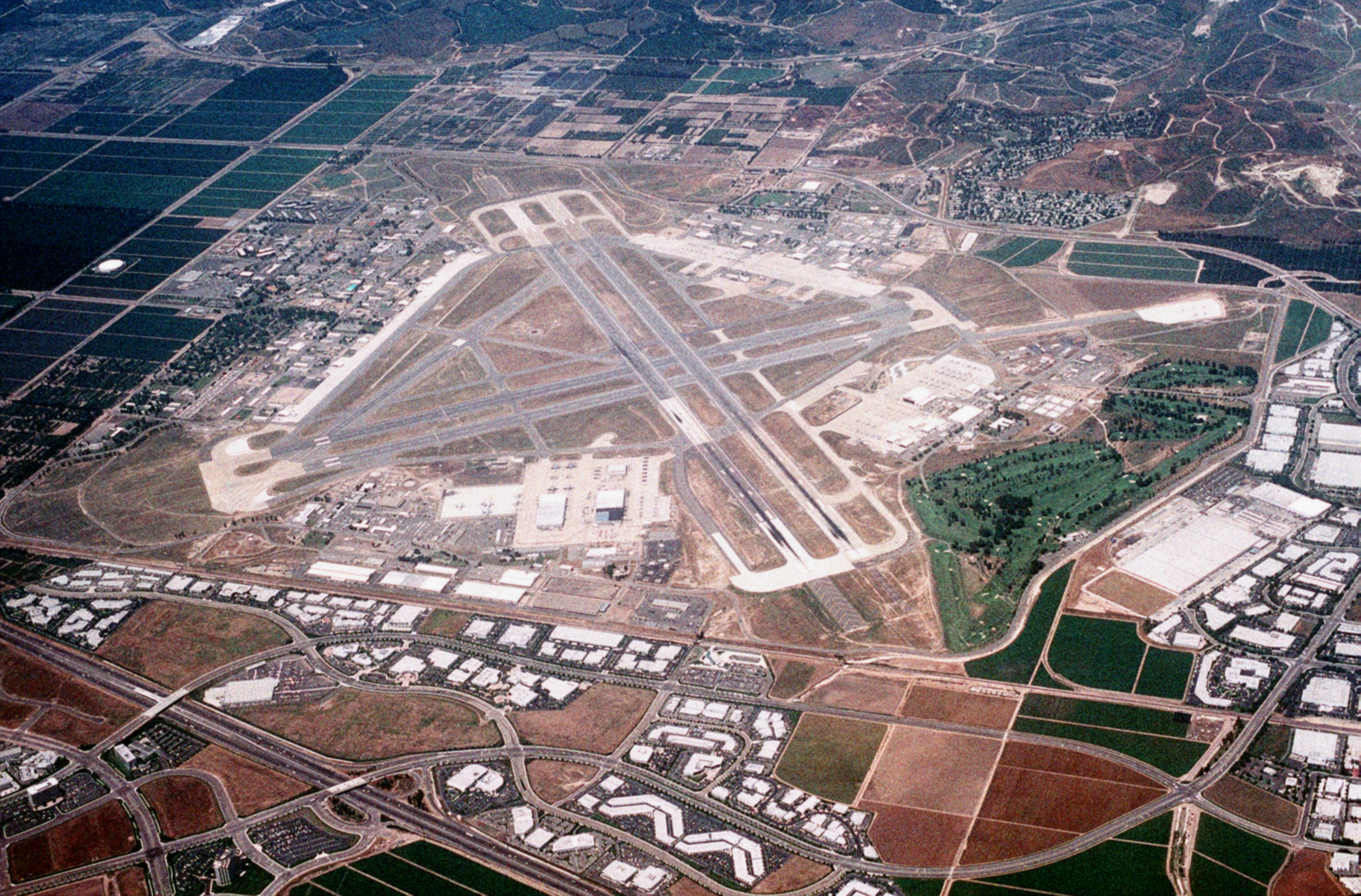
An aerial view of the U.S. Marine Corps Air Station in 1993.

The Great Park was the site of Marine Corps Air Station El Toro from 1943 to 1999. In 1993, the Base Realignment and Closure Commission recommended closing MCAS El Toro and transferring its activities to Marine Corps Air Station Miramar. This led to a lengthy political and public relations battle over the subsequent use of the base after its closure, and the issue figured prominently in Orange County politics during the late 1990s. Initial proposals included a commercial airport, housing and the Great Park. In 2001, Orange County voters passed Measure W, authorizing the former air station's use as a central park/nature preserve and multi-use development. The measure was passed, which led to the designation of the land as the Great Park.

The original plan for the infrastructure of the Great Park was virtually identical to Newport Center, with five roads connecting into a central loop road separating the park into blocks. The design was later modified to include a large section of runway and conform more to the layout of the original base, as a reminder of its history. Most prominent in the park plans is the restoration of Agua Chinon Creek, which had been channeled underground ever since the base was built in the 1940s.

A contest was held for the design of the park; the winning design was created by a team of landscape architects led by Ken Smith.

In the midst of the 2008 US housing crisis, developer Lennar struggled to fulfill its part of the bargain, including delayed construction of planned housing and a "community facilities district".

The Irvine City Council passed a vote in July 2014 for a plan that included removal of the canyon from the Great Park plan. FivePoint Communities was also given approval for 4,606 more homes near the park in exchange for $200 million to develop 688 acres (known locally as the "Not So Great Park") of the park which will include golf courses, a sports park and nature trails. The remaining 3,994 acres or 85% went to developers and additional city infrastructure.

The park has become a political football in Irvine city politics, with historical proponents of the airport and opponents of the park criticizing the implementation. In 2012, political opponents of long-term City Councilmember Larry Agran — including newly-elected Mayor Steven Choi and Councilmembers Christina Shea and Jeff Lalloway — won a 3-2 majority on the City Council, and called for another audit of Great Park expenditures. Agran and the other members of the City Council voted for the new audit, specifying that the cost should not exceed $250,000. Councilmembers Christina Shea and Jeff Lalloway appointed themselves to a newly constituted City Council Subcommittee charged with overseeing the audit. Through this two-person Subcommittee, Shea and Lalloway hired an accounting firm to conduct the audit: Hagen, Streiff, Newton & Oshiro (HSNO). The HSNO accounting firm was hired without a public bidding process. The Shea-Lalloway City Council subcommittee commissioned a forensic audit which claimed mismanagement of public dollars at the park. In January 2020, the accounting firm in charge of the audit, Hagen Streiff Newton & Oshiro, Accountants, lost its professional license and was charged $550,000 in fines, as the California Board of Accountancy said the firm "failed to comply with professional standards, engaged in numerous acts of negligence, and disseminated false and misleadingly information" in performing the Great Park audit.

Ahead of the 2026 FIFA World Cup, the OC Sports Commission was tasked with identifying a potential site to host one or multiple national teams in Orange County as a team base camp. After identifying possible venues, the Championship Soccer Stadium and the surrounding park was chosen to be advertised to FIFA, due to the park being one of the few venues in the area that met the requirements of having two FIFA regulation-sized soccer pitches and natural grass. The Championship and the Great Park was officially identified in June 2024 as a potential host site, and on March 10, 2026, it was announced that the United States Men's National Team had chosen the site to be the USA's base camp for the 2026 World Cup.

== Description ==
Great Park was designed by a team of landscape architects led by architect Ken Smith. Smith's plan was chosen from those submitted as part of an international contest for the park's design.

The park is owned by the City of Irvine and run by the non-profit Great Park Corporation; the corporation is governed by current city council members.

== Points of interest ==
The Great Park has a variety of attractions and activities centering around fitness, agriculture and the arts. The Great Park also has venues for special events including a restored hangar and a terraced lawn.

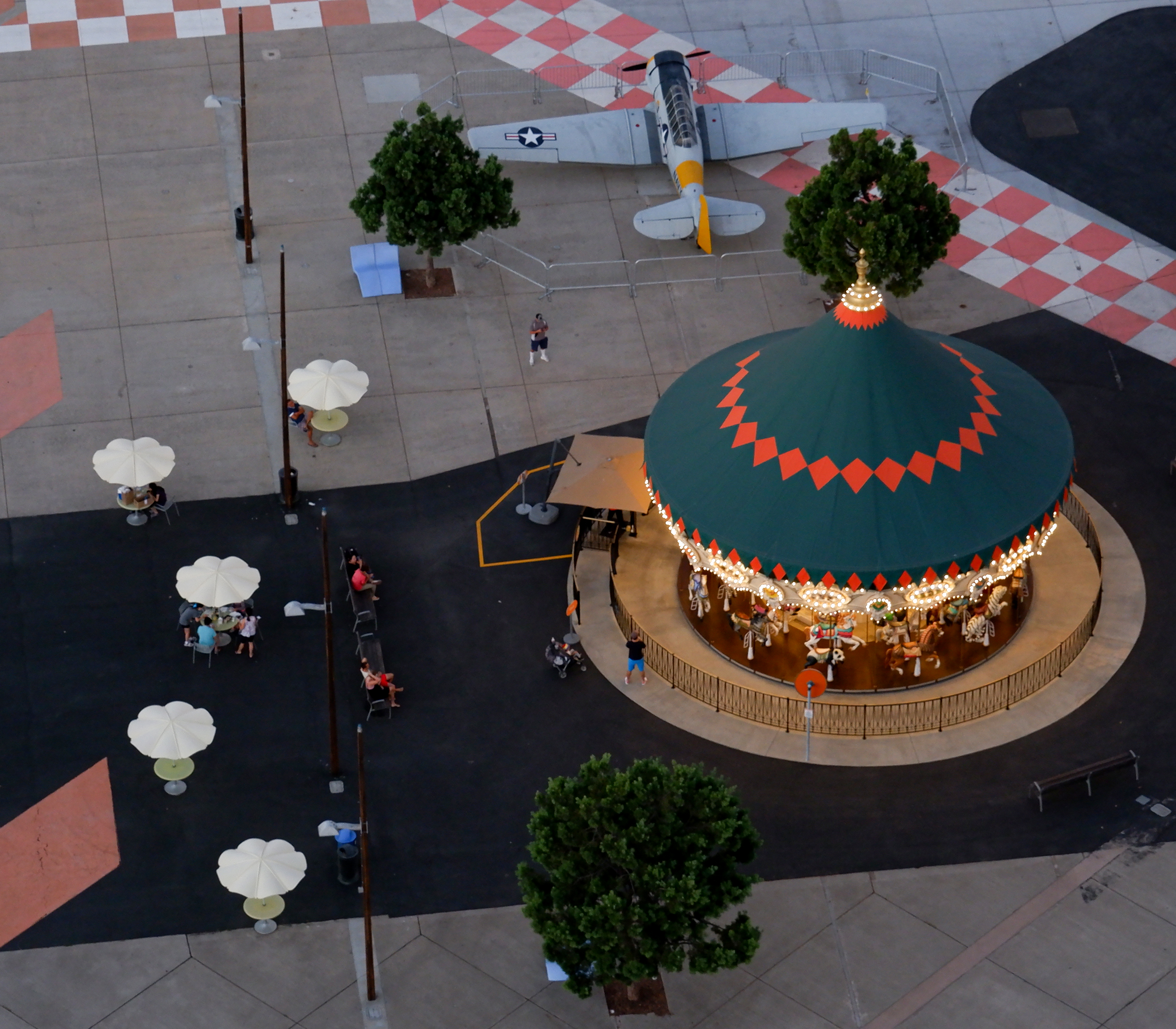
Carousel as seen from the Great Park Balloon

=== Attractions ===
The Great Park Balloon is the park's signature attraction. On July 14, 2007, the balloon ride—designed and operated by Aerophile SA—was the first attraction to open in the park. It transports visitors to a height of 500 feet (150 m) for a panoramic view of the county and the construction of the park. The balloon's gondola can fit 25–30 people. Also in Great Park is the Wild Rivers Water Park. After Wild River's original location was shut down on September 25, 2011, it was rebuilt 10 years later in Great Park's vicinity. The new water park had a funding of $60 million USD and held its opening on July 10, 2022. This location is around 50% larger than the original waterpark. In winter, the waterpark opens up as a winter wonderland, with lights and markets.

- The Great Park Carousel

=== Agriculture ===
- Certified farmers' market
- The Farm+Food Lab
- Giving Grove

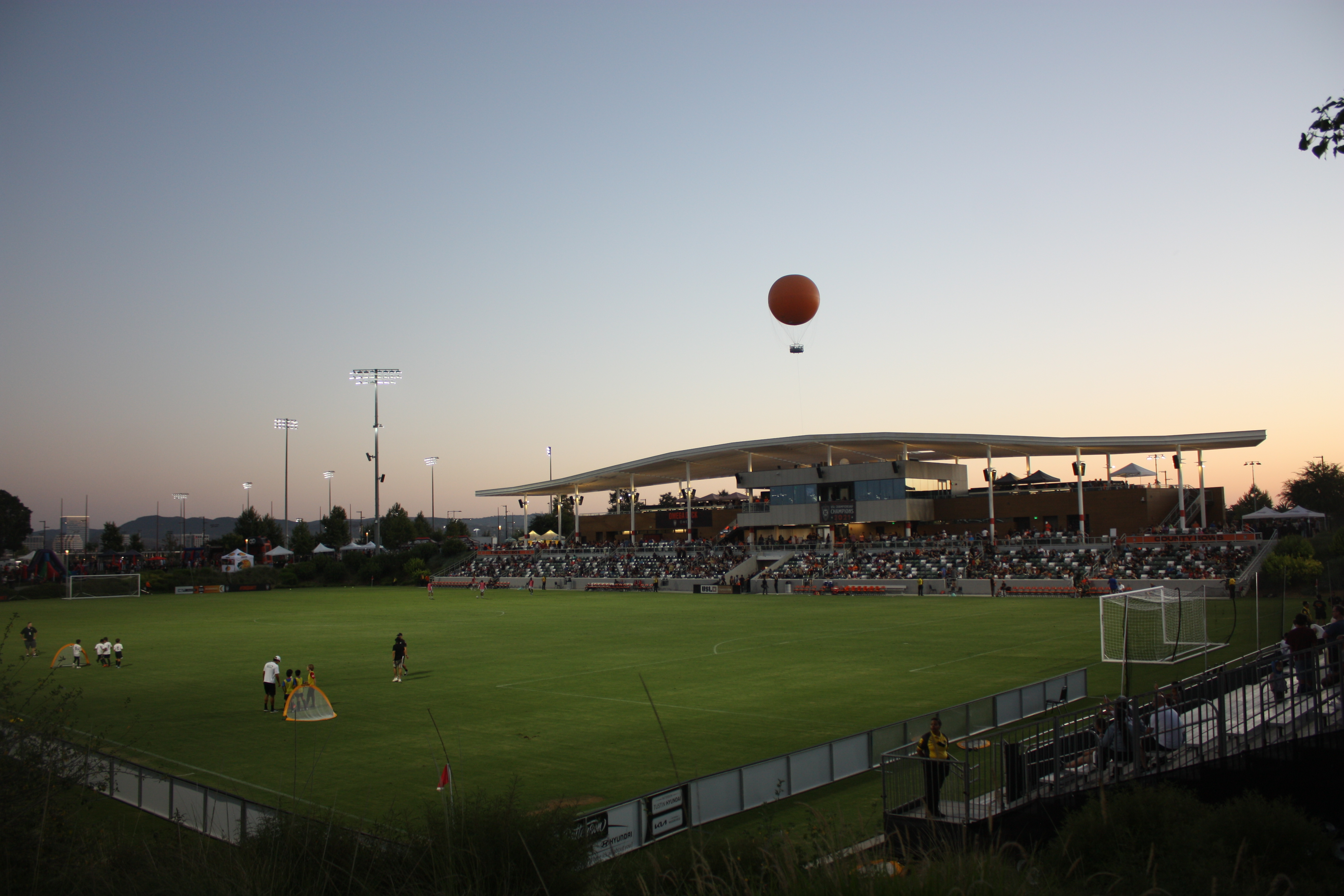
View of the Championship Soccer Stadium during halftime in an August 2024 soccer match

=== Sports and recreation ===
- Great Park Ice & FivePoint Arena - Four sheet ice rink facility (three NHL, one Olympic), practice facility of the Anaheim Ducks.
- 5,000-seat Championship Soccer Stadium - Home to Orange County SC
- 12 softball and baseball fields including Baseball Championship Stadium - Home of Orange County Riptide and a future Pioneer League (baseball) team
- 24 additional soccer fields
- Five sand volleyball courts
- Four basketball courts
- 25 tennis courts
- Kids rock and playground
- Reflecting ponds and viewing pier

=== Arts ===
- Hangar 244—permanent heritage and aviation exhibition
- Palm Court Arts Complex
- Walkable historical timeline

== Construction and future projects ==
The sports complex construction took place over multiple phases. A soccer stadium, volleyball courts, tennis courts and a playground were constructed over 53 acres (21 ha) as part of phase one, which opened in 2017. Phase two expanded the complex to 175 acres (71 ha) and included a baseball stadium; turf fields for soccer, football, rugby, or lacrosse; basketball courts; and additional baseball, softball and soccer fields. The project was completed with the grand opening of the baseball and softball facilities in September 2018.

The park's ice facility had a ground breaking ceremony hosted by the NHL's Anaheim Ducks in February 2017. The 280,000-square-foot (26,000 m^{2}) facility includes four ice sheets to support a variety of professional, youth and adult programs including figure skating, hockey, curling and broomball. It opened in December 2018.

The Cultural Terrace section in the southeast part of the park covers 248 acres (100 ha) and as of September 2021 is still in the planning stages. The City of Irvine is considering including an amphitheater, museums and a library. In June 2017, approved an exclusive negotiating agreement with Wild Rivers, a water park that operated further south in Irvine for 25 years before closing in 2011 when its lease expired. The new 26-acre (11 ha) water park opened in July 2022. Some residents are urging the inclusion of a botanical garden. As of March 2021 62 acres (25 ha) of the Cultural Terrace section were leased to a company that operates a green waste and recycling plant there. On April 20, 2023, it was announced that the architectural firm SWA Group's Laguna Beach branch released newly updated plans for the park, including extra room for the supposed 40-acre botanical garden should it be expanded in the future after it is built. In addition to botanical gardens, there will be an outdoor amphitheater with 12,000 seats, a museum, lakes, farms, a library, more trails and playgrounds and a 200-acre sports park.

In May 2022 a Memorandum of Understanding was signed between the City of Irvine and Flying Leatherneck Aviation Museum to relocate the museum from Marine Corps Air Station Miramar back to the Great Park, which once housed the museum when the area was MCAS El Toro. The current plan is for the museum to reopen in fall 2025-Spring 2026.

A wildlife corridor between chaparral areas near Laguna Beach and the Cleveland National Forest in the Santa Ana Mountains opened in mid-2019; 2.5 miles (4.0 km) of a total 6 miles (9.7 km) required restoration.

=== Planned cricket stadium ===
Los Angeles Knight Riders, a franchise team that plays in Major League Cricket, announced plans in 2022 to build a stadium at Great Park. The stadium was expected to cost $30 million and seat upwards of 10,000 spectators upon its completion 2024 or 2025. In 2026, the team announced that it would instead be playing its home games at Fairplex in Pomona.

== See also ==
- Irvine Transportation Center at the southwest corner of the parkland
