= Don Ebert =

American soccer player and coach

Personal information
- Date of birth: June 4, 1959 (age 67)
- Place of birth: St. Louis, Missouri, United States
- Height: 6 ft 0 in (1.83 m)
- Position: Forward

College career
| Years | Team | Apps | (Gls) |
| 1977–1979 | SIU Edwardsville Cougars | | |

Senior career*
| Years | Team | Apps | (Gls) |
| 1980 | New York Cosmos | 0 | (0) |
| 1980–1986 | St. Louis Steamers (indoor) | 260 | (239) |
| 1986–1988 | Los Angeles Lazers (indoor) | 35 | (18) |

Managerial career
- 2001–2008: Concordia Eagles
- 2019–2022: California United Strikers
- * Club domestic league appearances and goals

Don "Mad Hatter" Ebert is a retired U.S. soccer forward who spent most of his career with two indoor clubs, the St. Louis Steamers and the Los Angeles Lazers.

== Youth ==
Ebert attended Rosary High School in St. Louis, Missouri. In 1976, Ebert and his teammates went to the state high school championship game where they lost to Oakville High School, which was coached by Jim Bokern. Following high school, Ebert attended Southern Illinois University Edwardsville (SIU-E) where he played on the men's soccer team from 1977 to 1979. Ebert quickly became a mainstay of the Cougars offense, leading the team in goals all three seasons. In 1977, he scored fourteen goals and was tied for the team lead in assists with six. In 1978, he scored sixteen and in 1979 he upped his total once more, to twenty-two. That season he also led the team in assists, with ten. SIU-E also won the NCAA championship, defeating Clemson 3–2. Ebert chose to leave college after only three years in order to pursue a professional career. In 2006, SIU-E inducted the entire 1979 men's soccer team into the school's Athletic Hall of Fame.

== Professional ==
The New York Cosmos of the North American Soccer League selected Ebert with the first pick in the 1980 College Draft. Ebert, unhappy with his lack of playing time, and stubborn coach, asked for his release in June in order to go back to his home town and play for the St. Louis Steamers of Major Indoor Soccer League (MISL), whom he signed with in August 1980. That season, he led the team with 46 goals and 64 points. This extraordinary output by a rookie led to his selection as the 1980-1981 MISL Rookie of the Year. He remained with the Steamers into the 1986–1987 season. That year, the Steamers began poorly and head coach Pat McBride was fired to be replaced by Tony Glavin. Glavin promptly traded Ebert to the Los Angeles Lazers where Ebert finished his career.

== International career ==
Ebert was selected for the 1979 Pan American Games held in San Juan, Puerto Rico. Ebert made an immediate splash in the Pan American Games when he scored four goals in a 6–0 victory over the Dominican Republic. He was the captain of the U.S. team which qualified for the 1980 Summer Olympics. During qualification for the Olympic games the United States easily qualified as Ebert scored three goals in four games. Unfortunately for the Americans, Jimmy Carter chose to boycott the games after the Soviet Union invaded Afghanistan.

== Coaching ==
After retiring from soccer, Ebert became a youth soccer coach. He is currently the Technical Director and Director of USSDA club Strikers FC in Irvine, California, as well as the head coach of NISA club California United Strikers FC. From 2001 to 2008, Ebert was head coach of the Concordia University Irvine soccer program. He left in 2008 with a lifetime record of 111 wins, 50 losses, and 7 ties (.660 win pct).

== Other ventures ==
Ebert has been the Director of Marketing and Operations for Forum Boxing, Inc. He was the president and general manager of the defunct indoor club Anaheim Splash of the Continental Indoor Soccer League during the 1996 season.
