= California United Strikers FC =

American soccer team

California United FC
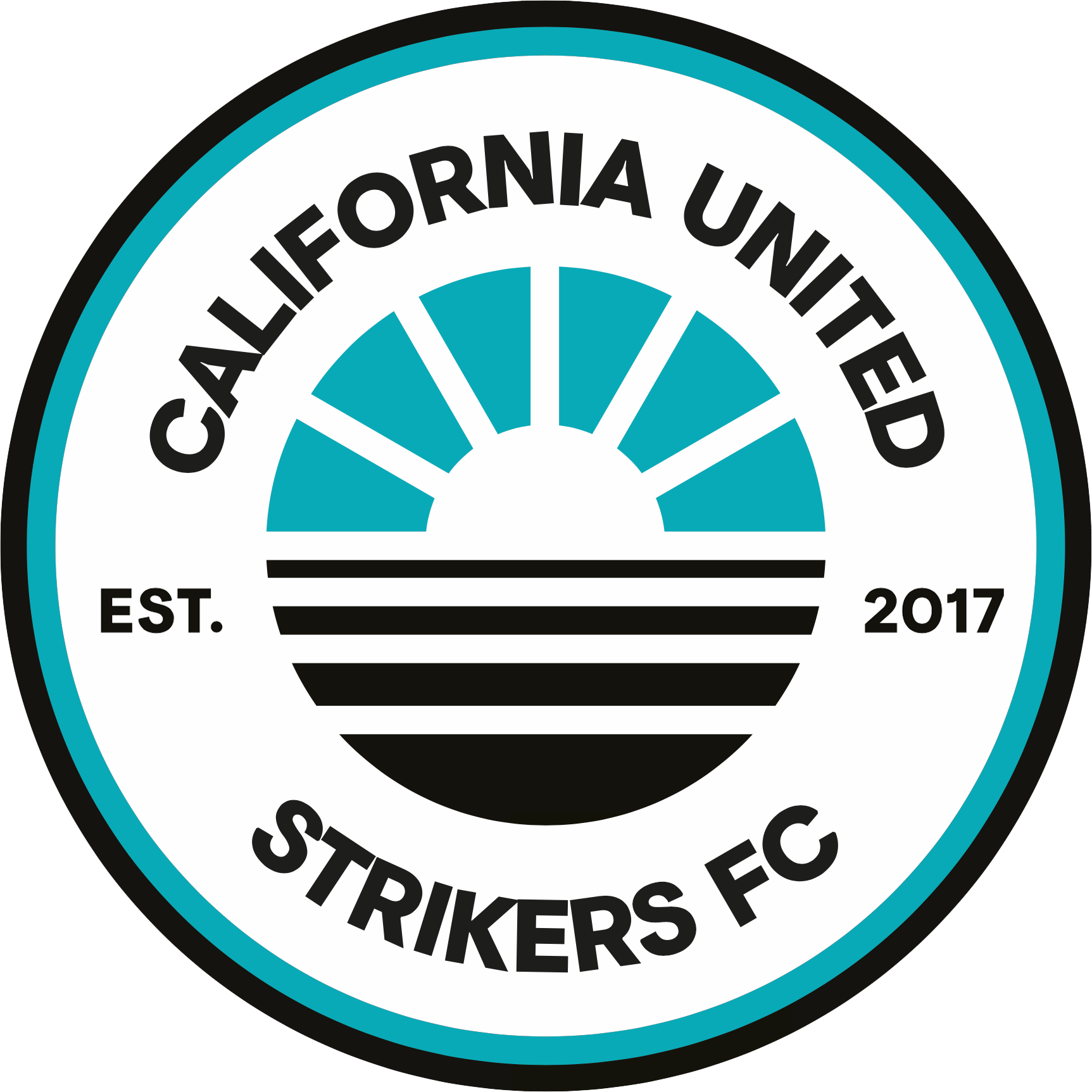
- Full name: California United Strikers Football Club
- Founded: May 10, 2017; 9 years ago
- Stadium: Championship Soccer Stadium; Irvine, California
- Capacity: 5,000
- Owner(s): Bronwyn & Pete Capriotti
- President: Michael Collins
- Head coach: Don Ebert
- League: NISA
- Website: cal-united-strikersfc.com
Home colors

California United Strikers FC is an American professional soccer club based in Orange County, California.

== History ==
The club was founded by Bronwyn & Pete Capriotti and Michael Collins, who have had connections to the adult amateur United Premier Soccer League.

California United FC intended to join the North American Soccer League (NASL) as an expansion franchise for the 2018 season. However, due to the instability of the league, California United withdrew its franchise agreement from NASL in early 2018 and announced that it was exploring all professional league options for the 2019 season. On November 15, 2018, the club was announced as a participant in the 2019 NPSL Founders Cup and as a founding member of a new league to being in 2020.

On March 2, 2019, the team tweeted out their intention to withdraw from the NPSL and NPSL Founders Cup. Three months later, on June 10, 2019, the team was accepted into the National Independent Soccer Association (NISA) as a member for the league's inaugural season.

The club participated in the Western Conference NISA championship in Fall 2019. On November 10, 2019, the team won the 2019 NISA Western Conference championship.

There was no US Open Cup competition during 2020 or 2021 due to the COVID-19 pandemic. The club played in NISA's 2021 Fall Season with a 9-6-3 record, finishing second to Detroit City FC.

In 2022, California United FC made it to the Round of 32 against LA Galaxy in the 2022 U.S. Open Cup. They won against San Fernando Valley FC (5-0) in the second round and beat USL League 1 FC Tucson (2-1) in the third round. They lost 3-2 to LA Galaxy, with Shinya Kadono and Kevin Garcia-Lopez making the two goals for California United FC.

After the 2022 U.S. Open Cup, the club was unable to find a new primary owner and was dissolved. However, on June 9, 2023, NISA announced the club would be revived as Strikers FC with Michael Collins as the leader.

== Year-by-year ==
Season	League	Div.	Pos.	Pl.	W	D	L	GS	GA	Pts.	Playoffs	U.S. Open Cup	Top goalscorer		Manager
Season	League	Div.	Pos.	Pl.	W	D	L	GS	GA	Pts.	Playoffs	U.S. Open Cup	Name	League	Manager
2019–20	NISA	Fall – West Coast (Note: The Fall 2019 NISA season had eight teams split into two separate conferences, East Coast and West Coast)	2nd	6	2	3	1	13	9	9	Champions	Second Round	(United States) Christian Thierjung	6	(United States) Don Ebert
2019–20	NISA	Spring (Note: Spring season cancelled before completion)	2nd	2	1	1	0	1	0	4	Cancelled	Second Round	(United States) Christian Thierjung	6	(United States) Don Ebert
2020-21	NISA	Fall	3rd, Group B	3	1	1	1	5	4	4	DNQ	Cancelled	4 players	2	(United States) Don Ebert
2020-21	NISA	Spring	4th	8	2	2	4	12	10	13	DNQ	Cancelled	4 players	2	(United States) Don Ebert
2021	NISA	Fall	2nd	18	9	6	3	31	20	33	No playoffs	Cancelled	(Mexico) Omar Nuño	12	(United States) Don Ebert
2022	NISA	West	1st	21	14	4	3	35	12	46	Semifinals	Round of 32	(Mexico) Omar Nuño	9	(United States) Willie Diaz

== California United FC II ==
California United maintains a second Team which participates in the Pro Premier division of the United Premier Soccer League (UPSL). The team played as the L.A. Wolves FC in the 2017 UPSL Spring Season, then as OC Invicta in the 2017 UPSL Fall Season. Both teams were coached by Eric Wynalda and both were crowned UPSL National Champions in each season. In the Fall 2018 season, under the California United FC II name, the team went undefeated(13–0–0) and won a third UPSL National Championship.

Additionally, as L.A. Wolves FC the team placed third in the United States Adult Soccer Association (USASA) 2017 National Championship in Milwaukee, Wisconsin.

The club also maintains an academy team in Irvine, called the Irvine Strikers.
