= Tim DiBisceglie =

Footballer & coach

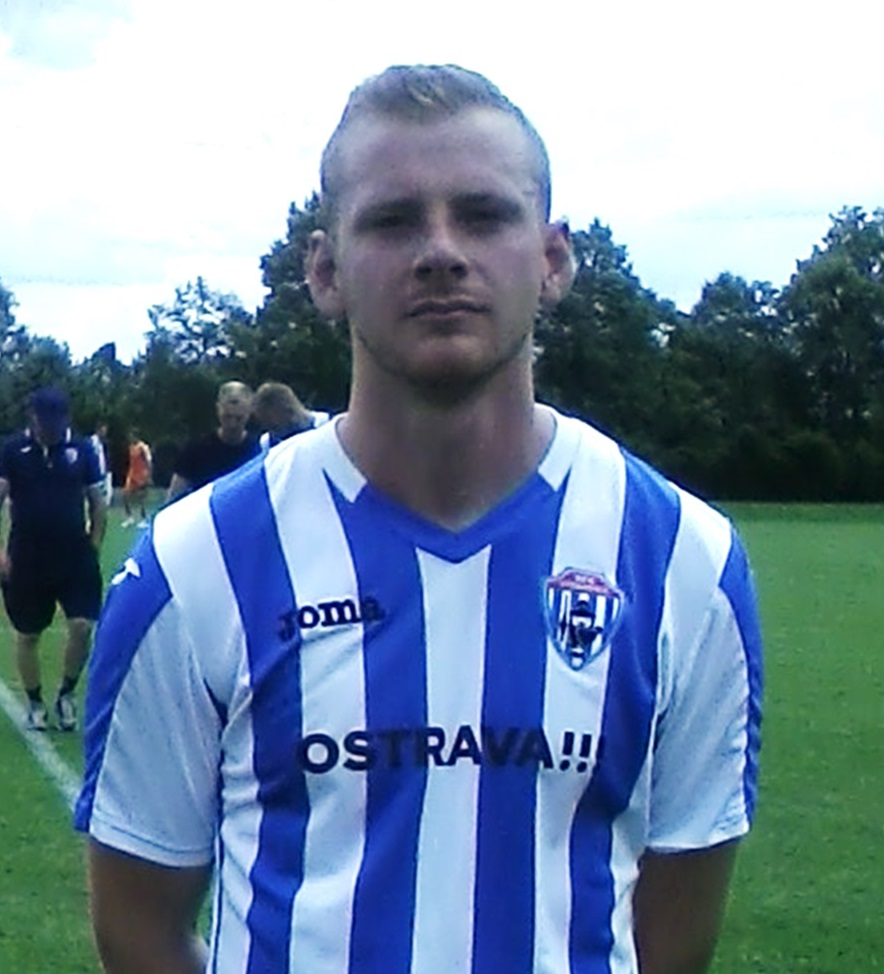
- DiBisceglie with FK Vítkovice (Czech Republic)

Personal information
- Date of birth: November 1, 1994 (age 31)
- Place of birth: Denville, New Jersey, U.S.
- Height: 1.87 m (6 ft 2 in)
- Position: Defensive midfielder

Youth career
- 2009–2011: IMG Academy
- 2009–2010: New York Red Bulls
- 2009–2012: Gill St. Bernard Knights

College career
Years	Team	Apps	(Gls)
2013–2016	Scranton Royals	73	(8)

Senior career*
Years	Team	Apps	(Gls)
2011	Kilmarnock	2	(0)
2015–2016	Electric City Shock SC	21	(4)
2016	FK Vítkovice	1	(0)
2017–2019	Philadelphia Atoms	16	(1)
- * Club domestic league appearances and goals as of September 23, 2017

Timothy Richard DiBisceglie (born November 1, 1994) is an American retired professional soccer player and current soccer coach.

== Career ==
=== Youth ===
On November 17, 2009, Gill St. Bernard's won their first state team boys championship of any kind in the school's history with a 3–0 victory over St. Rose High School of Belmar, New Jersey. As a first-year starter, DiBisceglie earned two points in the title match with assists on the game-winning goal and the final goal. Prior to college, he trained with US Olympic Development men's soccer team at IMG Academy under Jeff Tipping in Bradenton, Florida in the summers from 2009 through 2011. Tipping named DiBisceglie team captain in 2011. His selection to represent the Princeton Soccer Association at IMG was made through the USL's Super Y-League as part of the Jersey United soccer club. Prior to their 2010 season, New York Red Bulls Academy's director Bob Montgomery had DiBisceglie train with the Red Bulls U16 squad under head coach Rob Elliott.

During the high school soccer fall seasons, he was a four-year starter in the midfield and a two-year captain for the Gill St Bernard Knights in Gladstone, New Jersey. He completed his career as the Knight's eighth all-time scorer in the school's history with 101 points (20g/61a) and was All-State, All-Conference, All-Area, All-County, All-Prep and All-Non Public. In both 2011 and 2012, he was the assist leader of all Somerset County high school soccer players at any level, Public and Non-Public, male or female.

=== College ===
After being recruited by twenty-one college soccer programs, most notably, Holy Cross, Iona and Rutgers University, DiBisceglie chose to attend the University of Scranton, where he was a four-year starter as a defensive center midfielder for the Royals. Scoring eight goals in 73 appearances, while also recording 11 assists, he was named to the NSCAA's All-Landmark Conference First Team in 2015 and was All-Conference again in 2016.

On November 7, 2015, the Scranton Royals came from behind to defeat the #6 nationally ranked Elizabethtown Blue Jays 3–2 for the school's first conference men's soccer championship in 30 years. DiBisceglie assisted on Scranton's initial goal that changed the game in the upset victory.

One year later, almost exactly to the day, on November 5, 2016, the Royals once again travelled to Elizabethtown to meet in the Landmark Championship re-match. Like he did in 2015, DiBisceglie found his way onto the score sheet again in 2016 to give Scranton a 1–0 victory in the title rematch over the Blue Jays. To date, DiBisceglie is the only player in Landmark Conference history to register assists in back-to-back Men's Soccer Championship victories.

The 2016 Landmark Championship sent the Royals to the NCAA Men's Soccer Tournament where on November 12, 2016, Scranton defeated Penn St Behrend, 2–1 to advance to the NCAA tournament's second round. On November 13, 2016, the Royals lost to 13th ranked SUNY Cortland 1–2 in the Round of 32. Despite playing in just the two tournament matches, DiBisceglie finished the NCAA competition ranked seventh in America amongst all players for most shots per game.

=== Semi-professional ===
While in college, he doubled as a semi-professional central midfielder for the Electric City Shock SC in the National Premier Soccer League playing 21 matches during the Shock's 2015 and 2016 spring to summer campaigns.

On March 14, 2015, he signed a contract with Electric City and opened his account that same evening with a goal against the Trenton Rebels in his first match with the Shock.

On May 22, 2016, he scored a goal and had two assists in the come-from-behind 4–3 overtime victory for Electric City over NPSL powerhouse, Junior Lonestar FC. In that match, his second assist at the 90th minute won the match for Electric City, while his 52nd-minute bending goal around the Lonestar keeper from 24 yards away was recognized as the Shock's 2016 Goal of the Year.

At the conclusion of the 2016 season, DiBisceglie finished tied for second on the team in goals scored and second in assists. As a result, he was nominated by Electric City to represent the NPSL's Northeastern Conference at the Los Angeles NPSL combine in January 2017. The nomination was made even though DiBisceglie missed the last three games of the NPSL season due to his transfer from the Shock in July to play professionally for FK Vítkovice in the Czech Republic National Football League.

=== Professional ===
==== Europe ====
DiBisceglie's first professional soccer experience occurred in Scotland as a trialist with Kilmarnock FC in the Scottish Premier League in 2011. Arranged by former Welsh footballer and Swansea player, Glan Letheren, the trial became a success when Killie manager, Alan Robertson looked to sign DiBisceglie to a multi-year contract. Unfortunately the American was not able to obtain the required UK work-visa before the start of a Scottish Premier League season. But during the pre-season trial, DiBisceglie did get to play centre back for Kilmarnock, subbing on in the 35th minute of a match at Everton F.C. in England on August 6, 2011. On August 11, 2011, DiBisceglie also anchored Killie's back four for the full 90 minutes in their 2–0 win over Grange. On August 15, 2011, he travelled with Kilmarnock for a match at Rangers F.C. before having to return to the US.

On July 4, 2016, DiBisceglie was offered a two-year professional contract from FK Vítkovice of the Czech Republic's National Football League. The team owner's offer was communicated through Glan Letheren and was based on DiBisceglie's CV. The 22-year-old flew to Vitkovice for training the next day. On July 9, 2016, he started and played the full match at centre back in Vítkovice's 2–0 win at Sigma Olomouc. After difficult deliberations with Vitkovice manager (Roman West), DiBisceglie chose not to sign the Vitkovice contract in order to pursue other professional opportunities in the United States. Roman West had become the manager of Vitkovice on July 1, 2016, just four days before DiBisceglie arrived. West was sacked 64 days later by the Vitkovice owners on September 4, 2016.

==== America ====
On March 21, 2017, DiBisceglie signed a two-year professional soccer contract to play center back for the Philadelphia Atoms of the American Soccer League. DiBisceglie debuted on April 9, 2017, when he started and played the full ASL match vs Mass United FC.

On June 10, 2017, DiBisceglie was awarded Veritas Man of the Match for his efforts v SGFC Maryland.

On September 23, 2017, the Philadelphia Atoms set a team record with six goals in a single match in a 6–1 win over AFC Lancaster. The old team record was set when the Atoms defeated the Washington Diplomats 5–1 in the NASL on May 4, 1974. DiBisceglie's opened his professional account with the first professional goal of his career. This goal doubled as Philadelphia's record-breaking sixth goal in the 63rd minute of the match. Earlier in that same match, he also notched his first professional assist on the Atoms' opening goal in the 5th minute.

On October 12, 2017, DiBisceglie was elevated to player/Assistant Coach for Philadelphia by the Atoms' General Manager, Ike Onyeador.

On November 4, 2017, Philadelphia concluded their inaugural season in Boston where DiBisceglie set the team record with 1,440 minutes played for the Atoms. Team owner, Matt Driver, suspended operations of the Philadelphia Atoms in late 2018 due to financial difficulties. Driver subsequently folded the ASL in 2019, making DiBisceglie a free-agent.

== Personal life ==
DiBisceglie was born in Denville, New Jersey to Kathy and Bruce DiBisceglie. His maternal grandfather, Joseph is of Irish descent, while his paternal grandfather, Domdi, is Italian. The rest of his paternal ancestry is Austrian and Costa Rican (also known as "Austarian") and his remaining maternal ancestry is Swiss, German and French. He was raised in Mine Hill Township, New Jersey with his elder sister, Elizabeth. His father, mother and sister are all former soccer players. He is cousin to New York Giants Super Bowl XXI offensive lineman Brad Benson.

=== Coaching ===
At the University of Scranton, DiBisceglie majored in early and primary childhood education and minored in coaching.

On March 6, 2018, he was named head coach of the Gill St Bernard's boys JV soccer team and assistant coach for the boys varsity team, reuniting him with NJSIAA Hall of Fame coach, Tony Bednarsky. On November 11, 2018, Gill St Bernard's defeated Rutgers Prep 7–0 for the New Jersey State Boys Soccer Championship with DiBisceglie on Bednarsky's staff as his assistant coach. DiBisceglie is the first athlete to win a NJSIAA state championship for Gill St Bernard's as a player (2009) and a coach (2018, 2019, 2020, 2021, 2022, 2023, 2024).

In 2019, with DiBisceglie as Assistant Coach for Bednarsky, Gill St Bernard began their pre-season in Portugal (3W-1D-1L), and then went on to win five championships titles: NJSIAA States, NJSIAA Sectionals, Somerset County (first in school history), Prep-B, and the Skyland-Raritan regular season Division. The Knights finished the 2019 campaign ranked No. 5 in all of New Jersey boys high school soccer with a 20–3 record and the five titles. The Gill St Bernard coaching staff groomed their 2019 players to three All-State, five All-Section, and eight All-Conference honors.

In 2020, DiBisceglie was promoted to Bednarsky's first assistant coach for Gill St Bernards. The Knights enjoyed an undefeated season as they posted a 20-0-3 record (13-0-1 NJSIAA, 7-0-2 Prep/County Tournament play). GSB won their sixth NJ state championship and finished ranked as the No. 1 boys high school team in New Jersey. The Knights were also ranked as the No. 4 boys high school soccer team in the United States.

In 2021, DiBisceglie was promoted to co-Head Coach for Gill St Bernard's Boys Soccer. Despite losing five of seven matches from Sept 27-Oct 16, Head Coaches Bednarsky and DiBisceglie guided the team to a 12-7-3 record. The Knights concluded their 2021 campaign with their 4th consecutive and 7th overall NJ state championship by defeating Princeton Day 3–1 on Nov 14, 2021.

In 2022, Bednarski and DiBisceglie co-coached the Gill St. Bernard's Knights to their eighth New Jersey State Championship and their fifth consecutive NJSIAA Non-Public B State Championship, achieved on November 15, 2023. The Knights concluded the season with a 16–6–1 record, triumphing over the Non-Public B South Sectional Champions, St. Rose, in a thrilling championship match. After 100 minutes of play ended in a 0–0 draw, the match was decided by penalty kicks, where Gill St. Bernard's emerged victorious with a 3–2 win. This championship win came almost twelve years to the day when GSB won their first ever NJSIAA Non-Public B State Championship, also over St. Rose. In that 2010 title match, DiBisceglie, as a player, scored two assists in the 3–0 win over St. Rose.

In 2023, DiBisceglie and Bednarski guided the Gill St. Bernard's Knights to their sixth consecutive and ninth overall State Championship. The Knights, as the #1 seed, advanced to the State title match by dominating the four-round, single-elimination North Jersey Sectionals. From October 27 through November 7, they scored 21 goals while conceding only 1. Then on November 10, the Non-Public B Northern Champion Knights defeated the Southern Jersey Non-Public B Champs, Moorestown Friends 5–0.

On November 21, 2024, DiBisceglie served as the Associate Head Coach for the Gill St. Bernard Knights, who boasted a 16-6-1 record. The team secured their seventh consecutive State title and tenth overall by triumphing over the top-seeded New Jersey South Boys Non-Public B Champion, Moorestown Friends High School, with an 8-0 victory, thereby clinching the overall New Jersey Boys Non-Public B Championship. Earlier, on November 12, 2024, the Knights advanced to the State Final by defeating the #1 seeded Montclair Kimberly Academy, marking their 10th Sectional Championship win since 2009.

In the spring of 2026, Gill St. Bernard’s made a major change to their Boy's Soccer program. Head Coach Tony Bednarsky retired from coaching on May 21st after 36 years, leading GSB Soccer to 610 wins. Bednarsky retired as one of the winningest coaches in New Jersey boys' soccer history. On the same day, Director of Athletics Jenn Noon announced that Tim DiBisceglie ’13 will take over as Boys’ Soccer Head Coach. “Noon stated that DiBisceglie's understanding of the school's tradition as a former student-athlete would help carry the program forward.” DiBisceglie will begin the 2026 season with an overall coaching record of 122-45-11 including seven New Jersey state titles in his eight years at Gill St Bernard's. As a player for GSB (2009-12), his team's overall record was 55-17-2 with one NJ state, three Non-Public B, one Prep-B, and two Valley Division championships.
