= 2014–15 ASL season =

American Soccer League
- Season: 2014–15
- Champions: Icon FC
- Premiers: Western Mass Pioneers
- Matches: 68
- Goals: 219 (3.22 per match)
- Biggest home win: WMA 5, ACC 0 (September 20)
- Biggest away win: IRN 4, ACC 1 (October 5)
- Highest scoring: ACC 6, PHI 5 (August 23)

The 2014–15 American Soccer League season is the first in league history. Historically, it is the fourth league to be called American Soccer League. The fall season began on August 23 with two games and ended on November 8. The spring season started on April 4 and ended on June 23.

== Teams ==
=== Stadiums and Locations ===
Team	Location	Stadium	Capacity
AC Crusaders	Egg Harbor Township, New Jersey	Egg Harbor Township High School	1,000
Evergreen Diplomats	Hyattsville, Maryland	Marvin F. Wilson Stadium	1,000
Icon FC	Montville, New Jersey	Boverini Stadium	1,000
Ironbound Soul SC	Newark, New Jersey	Ironbound Stadium	1,000
Mass United FC	Lynn, Massachusetts	Manning Bowl	21,000
Philadelphia Fury	Washington Township, New Jersey	Washington Township High School	1,000
Rhode Island Oceaneers	Cranston, Rhode Island	Cranston Stadium	3,000
Western Mass Pioneers	Ludlow, Massachusetts	Lusitano Stadium	3,000

=== Personnel and kits ===
Note: Flags indicate national team as has been defined under FIFA eligibility rules. Players may hold more than one non-FIFA nationality.

Team	Manager	Captain	Kit supplier	Shirt sponsor
AC Crusaders	(North Macedonia) Nenad Gorgiev		Admiral	
Evergreen Diplomats	(Scotland) Phil Gordon		Admiral	
Icon FC	(United States) Phil Swenda	(United States) Teddy Niziolek	Admiral	
Ironbound Soul SC	(Portugal) Joe Manso	(Israel) Ryan Adeleye	Admiral	
Mass United FC	(United States) Stefano Franciosa		Admiral	
Philadelphia Fury	(Scotland) Matthew Driver		Admiral	
Rhode Island Oceaneers	(The Gambia) Kabba Joof		Admiral	
Western Mass Pioneers	(Argentina) Federico Molinari	(United States) Jay Willis	Adidas	Subway

== Standings ==
=== Northeast Conference ===
Pos	Team	Pld	W	L	D	GF	GA	GD	Pts	Qualification
1	Western Mass Pioneers (C)	18	10	1	7	37	14	+23	37	2014-15 Premiers
2	Rhode Island Oceaneers	18	8	6	4	34	28	+6	34 (Note: 6 bonus points?)	2014-15 Other playoff teams
3	Mass United FC	17	6	2	9	32	22	+10	27	
4	Ironbound Soul SC	9	0	9	0	0	27	−27	0 (Note: Ironbound Soul SC withdrew in mid-season. All previous results were declared forfeits.)	

Source: Source
(C) Division Winner

=== Mid-Atlantic Conference ===
Pos	Team	Pld	W	L	D	GF	GA	GD	Pts	Qualification
1	Icon FC	18	10	4	4	32	17	+15	34	2014-15 Other playoff teams
2	Philadelphia Fury	19	7	9	3	30	30	0	24	2014-15 Other playoff teams
3	Evergreen Diplomats	18	7	11	0	28	33	−5	21	
4	AC Crusaders	19	5	11	3	26	48	−22	18	

Source: Source

== Playoffs ==
=== Semi-finals ===
June 27, 2015	Western Mass Pioneers	2–0	Philadelphia Fury	Ludlow, Massachusetts
				Stadium: Lusitano Stadium

June 27, 2015	Icon FC	6–0	Rhode Island Oceaneers	Montville, New Jersey
				Stadium: Boverini Stadium

=== Championship ===
July 3, 2015	Icon FC	0–0 (a.e.t.) (6–5 p)	Western Mass Pioneers	Glassboro, New Jersey
				Stadium: Rowan Stadium
