= Philadelphia Atoms SC =

Defunct American soccer club

- Full name: Philadelphia Atoms Soccer Club
- Nickname: Atoms
- Founded: 2017
- Dissolved: 2018
- Stadium: Jean Lenox Stadium
- League: ASL
Home colors	Away colors

The Philadelphia Atoms were an American professional soccer team based out of Glenside, Pennsylvania that played in the American Soccer League (ASL).

They were named after, and claimed the heritage of, the original Philadelphia Atoms that played in the North American Soccer League from 1973 to 1976, and won the league championship in their first season.

In March 2017 the Philadelphia Atoms were given a second life when the newer squad was admitted into the ASL. The Atoms played for the first time in forty-years on April 1, 2017 versus Mass United FC. They currently play at Jean Lenox Stadium on the campus of Arcadia University.

On September 23, 2017, the Philadelphia set an all-time record for goals scored in a single match by defeating the Lancaster Lions 6-1, breaking the five-goal record set by the Atoms on May 4, 1974 vs. the Washington Diplomats in the NASL.

In 2018, the team dissolved due to insufficient support from ownership. Subsequently, the ASL dissolved as well.

== Year-by-year ==
Year	Spring Record	Fall Record	Overall Record	Spring Season Finish	Fall Season Finish	2017 Overall Finish	Playoffs
2017	3–6–1	5–5–0	8–11–1	4th place	4th place	4th place	qualified as #4 seed

== Head coaches ==
- (England) George Gunn (Spring 2017)
- (United States) Ken Enofe (Fall 2017)
- (Scotland) Stewart Plenderleith (2018)

== Team ==
2017 Roster

Note: Flags indicate national team as defined under FIFA eligibility rules; some limited exceptions apply. Players may hold more than one non-FIFA nationality.

No.	Pos.	Nation	Player
—	FW	USA	Bernard Avoulou
—	MF	USA	Josh Cirocco
—	DF	USA	Tim DiBisceglie
—	DF	SEN	Djebral Drame
—	MF	SEN	Serigno Drame
—	DF	GER	Mike Eric
—	DF	USA	Terah Garnett
—	MF	USA	Nick Enbop Morris
—	FW	USA	John J. Pacana III

No.	Pos.	Nation	Player
—	FW	USA	Eric Johnson
—	MF	USA	Alex Kardos
—	GK	USA	Joe Lubonski
—	MF	USA	Uche Onyeador
—	MF	USA	Aidan Passannante
—	FW	USA	DJ Rodriguez
—	MF	USA	Gene Shepherd
—	DF	USA	Rich Stone
—	GK	USA	Christian Wydeven

== See also ==
- Philadelphia Fury
- Philadelphia Spartans
- Philadelphia Union
