= Philadelphia Fury =

Philadelphia Fury may refer to:

- Philadelphia Fury (1978–1980), an American soccer team that competed in the North American Soccer League (NASL) from 1978 to 1980
- Philadelphia Fury (2011–2019), an American soccer team competed in the National Independent Soccer Association (NISA) from 2011 to 2019
