= Henri Manhebo =

American-Ivorian footballer

Personal information
- Full name: Henri Joel .M Gouhan
- Date of birth: July 17, 1990 (age 36)
- Place of birth: Ivory Coast
- Height: 1.78 m (5 ft 10 in)
- Position: Midfielder

Team information
- Current team: SGFC Eagles Maryland
- Number: 17

Youth career
- 2005–2006: Yopougon Sport Academy
- 2007–2008: Asec Jeune Du Plateau

Senior career*
Years	Team	Apps	(Gls)
2008–2010	Hassania Agadir	10	(3)
2015	Clarkstown SC Eagles	19	(0)
2015–2016	Tulsa Roughnecks	33	(1)
2017	SGFC Eagles Maryland	10	(1)

International career
2006–2007	Ivory Coast U17	2	(0)
- * Club domestic league appearances and goals as of 28 August 2017

Henri Joel .M Gouhan (born 17 July 1990) is a professional American-Ivorian footballer. He plays with SGFC Eagles Maryland as attacking midfielder in the American Soccer League.

== Club career ==
The midfielder played for Tulsa Roughnecks last season in USL and made his first appearance in a 1–1 draw at Oklahoma City in the Black Gold Derby. He was a starter in Tulsa's final 10 games of the season, recording his first professional goal in a 5–1 win over Real Monarchs SLC last August. Manhebo joined the Roughnecks midway through the club's inaugural season, and quickly established himself as a key player in the midfield.

Ivory Coast native Henri Manhebo signed a new one-year contract with SGFC Eagles Maryland that will keep him till the next season with an option of extension the team announced his capture early this year during US Soccer Convention.

== National team ==
Henri Manhebo Gouhan has played for the Ivory Coast national under-17 football team. He received a call by Alain Gouaméné Coach to the Ivorian U-17 national football team.
