= Daryl Ferguson =

Barbadian footballer (born 1985)

Personal information
- Date of birth: 4 June 1985 (age 41)
- Place of birth: Lanham, Maryland, United States
- Height: 1.83 m (6 ft 0 in)
- Position: Defender

Team information
- Current team: Fredericksburg Hotspur
- Number: 15

Youth career
- 2002–2004: D.C. United
- 2004–2007: Seton Hill Griffins

Senior career*
Years	Team	Apps	(Gls)
2006–2007	Delaware Dynasty	30	(1)
2008	Real Maryland Monarchs	18	(0)
2011–2014	Fredericksburg Hotspur	10	(0)
2014–	Evergreen Diplomats	1	(0)

International career^{‡}
2007	Barbados U-23	3	(0)
2008	Barbados	1	(0)
- * Club domestic league appearances and goals as of 9 August 2011 ‡ National team caps and goals as of 12 May 2011

Daryl Ferguson (born 4 June 1985) is a Barbadian footballer who plays for Evergreen Diplomats in the American Soccer League.

== Early life ==
Born in Maryland to a Barbadian mother and Grenadian father, Ferguson spent time with D.C. United's Super Y-League before going on to play college soccer at Seton Hill University. During his college years Ferguson also played two seasons for the Delaware Dynasty in the USL Premier Development League, and trained with the Charleston Battery of the USL First Division.

== Club career ==
Ferguson turned professional in December 2007 when he signed for the Real Maryland Monarchs of the USL Second Division. He played 18 games for the Monarchs in his debut professional season, but was released at the end of the season.

After a couple of years away from the professional game, Ferguson returned to play with Fredericksburg Hotspur in the USL Premier Development League in 2011.

== International career ==
Ferguson is a full international for the Barbados national football team, having previously played for the country at U-23 level, and in qualifying for the Olympic Games. In his only senior appearance to date, a World Cup qualifier against the United States in 2008, Ferguson was the only Barbados player to put the ball in the net - unfortunately, it was his own. The USA won, 8–0.
