= 2019–20 Philadelphia Fury season =

Philadelphia Fury
2019–20 season
- Sporting director: Matt Driver
- Head coach: Cris Vaccaro
- Stadium: Franklin Field
- NISA: Fall, East Coast Conf.: 4th Spring: N/A
- Playoffs: Fall: DNQ; Spring: N/A
- U.S. Open Cup: N/A
- Top goalscorer: League: Christian Schneider (1); All: Christian Schneider (1)
Home colours

The 2019–20 season covers the period from July 1 to September 18, 2019. It was the Philadelphia Fury's first professional season since the club was re-established in 2011 and their first in the National Independent Soccer Association. After playing just one match during the 2019–20 NISA season, the Fury announced that they were withdrawing from NISA until further notice.

== Roster ==
As of August 20, 2019

No.	Position	Nation	Player
1	GK	(Iran) IRN	Arshia Aghababazadeh
2	DF	(Jamaica) JAM	Malcolm Stewart
3	MF	(United States) USA	Gianluca Cuomo
4	MF	(United States) USA	Tyler Fabian
5	DF	(Norway) NOR	Ramzi Toure Idrissou
6	MF	(United States) USA	Ian McGrath
7	FW	(United States) USA	Cameron Vickers
8	MF	(Mexico) MEX	Cristhian Hernández
9	FW	(United States) USA	Thomas Suchecki
10	MF	(United States) USA	Connor Hurff
11	FW	(Puerto Rico) PUR	Sidney Rivera
12	DF	(United States) USA	Kyle Nuel
13	FW	(England) ENG	Luke Adams
14	MF	(United States) USA	Christian Schneider
15	DF	(England) ENG	Isaac Currie
16	DF	(United States) USA	Emmanuel Agboolah
18	FW	(Jamaica) JAM	Khori Bennett
19	DF	(United States) USA	Cameron Schneider
22	DF	(United States) USA	Danny Turgeon
23	DF	(United States) USA	Patrick Sullivan
24	DF	(United States) USA	Andrew Catalana
26	GK	(United States) USA	Guillermo Guerrero
—	GK	(United States) USA	Aidan Hogan

== Pre-season ==
August 31, 2019 Friendly	Detroit City	1–0	Philadelphia Fury	Hamtramck
7:30 pm EST	Peterson 63' (pen.)	Report		Stadium: Keyworth Stadium; Attendance: 5,859

== Competitions ==
=== NISA ===
The schedule for the 2019–20 NISA season was announced on July 25, 2019. On September 18, 2019, after playing only one game against Miami FC, the Fury announced that they were withdrawing from NISA until further notice.

==== East Coast Standings ====
Pos	Team	Pld	W	D	L	GF	GA	GD	Pts	Qualification
1	Miami FC (O)	6	4	2	0	19	6	+13	14	East Coast Championship
2	Stumptown Athletic	6	4	0	2	13	7	+6	12	East Coast Championship
3	Atlanta SC	6	2	2	2	13	10	+3	8	
4	Philadelphia Fury	6	0	0	6	1	23	−22	0	Withdrew (Note: Philadelphia Fury withdrew after one match and forfeited their remaining matches)

Source: NISAofficial.com
(O) Play-off winners

==== Matches ====
September 7, 2019 1	Philadelphia Fury	P–P	Stumptown Athletic	Philadelphia
				Stadium: Franklin Field
Note: Match postponed due to Hurricane Dorian and rescheduled to November 11, 2019.

September 15, 2019 1	Miami FC	8–1	Philadelphia Fury	Miami Shores, Florida
7:00 p.m.	Sam 21'; González 27, 80'; Bah 54'; Mares 58, 62, 68'; Suárez (yellow card) 86'; Philadelphia Fury 90' (o.g.)	Report; MyCujoo Broadcast	Hurff (yellow card) 49'; Bennett (yellow card) 71'; Schneider 77'	Stadium: Buccaneer Field at Barry University; Attendance: 782

September 21, 2019 3	Philadelphia Fury	P–P	Atlanta SC	Philadelphia
				Stadium: Franklin Field

September 28, 2019 4	Atlanta SC	P–P	Philadelphia Fury	Alpharetta
				Stadium: St. Francis High School

October 15, 2019 5	Stumptown Athletic	P–P	Philadelphia Fury	Pineville
				Stadium: CSA OrthoCarolina Sportsplex

October 19, 2019 6	Philadelphia Fury	P–P	Atlanta SC	Philadelphia
				Stadium: Franklin Field

November 1, 2019 7	Philadelphia Fury	P–P	Miami FC	Philadelphia
				Stadium: Franklin Field

== Squad statistics ==
As of match played September 15, 2019

=== Appearances and goals ===
No.	Pos	Nat	Player	Total		Fall Season	
No.	Pos	Nat	Player	Apps	Goals	Apps	Goals
Goalkeepers
1	GK	(Iran) IRN	Arshia Aghababazadeh	1	0	1	0
26	GK	(United States) USA	Guillermo Guerrero	1	0	1	0
	GK	(United States) USA	Aidan Hogan	0	0	0	0
Defenders
2	DF	(Jamaica) JAM	Malcolm Stewart	0	0	0	0
5	DF	(Norway) NOR	Ramzi Toure Idrissou	1	0	1	0
12	DF	(United States) USA	Kyle Nuel	1	0	1	0
15	DF	(England) ENG	Isaac Currie	0	0	0	0
16	DF	(United States) USA	Emmanuel Agboolah	1	0	1	0
19	DF	(United States) USA	Cameron Schneider	1	0	1	0
22	DF	(United States) USA	Danny Turgeon	0	0	0	0
23	DF	(United States) USA	Patrick Sullivan	1	0	1	0
24	DF	(United States) USA	Andrew Catalana	0	0	0	0
Midfielders
3	MF	(United States) USA	Gianluca Cuomo	1	0	1	0
4	MF	(United States) USA	Tyler Fabian	1	0	1	0
6	MF	(United States) USA	Ian McGrath	1	0	1	0
8	MF	(Mexico) MEX	Cristhian Hernández	0	0	0	0
10	MF	(United States) USA	Connor Hurff	1	0	1	0
14	MF	(United States) USA	Christian Schneider	1	1	1	1
Forwards
7	FW	(United States) USA	Cameron Vickers	1	0	1	0
9	FW	(United States) USA	Thomas Suchecki	1	0	1	0
11	FW	(Puerto Rico) PUR	Sidney Rivera	1	0	1	0
13	FW	(England) ENG	Luke Adams	0	0	0	0
18	FW	(Jamaica) JAM	Khori Bennett	1	0	1	0

=== Goal scorers ===
Place	Position	Nation	Number	Name	Total
1	MF	(United States)	14	Christian Schneider	1

=== Disciplinary record ===
Number	Nation	Position	Name	Total	
Number	Nation	Position	Name	Booked	Sent off (straight red)
10	(United States)	MF	Connor Hurff	1	0
18	(Jamaica)	FW	Khori Bennett	1	0
