= Edie Clark =

American writer (1948–2024)

- Born: December 10, 1948; Summit, New Jersey
- Died: July 7, 2024 (aged 75)
- Education: Beaver College
- Occupations: Author and journalist
- Writing career
- Notable work: The Place He Made
- Website: Author's website

Edythe ("Edie") Sterling Clark (December 10, 1948 – July 7, 2024) was an American nonfiction author who lived in the Monadnock Region of New Hampshire. She was known for her writings with Yankee magazine and books on New England life.

== Early life ==
Clark was born in Summit, New Jersey, and attended Gill St. Bernard's School, graduating in 1966. She graduated from Beaver College, now known as Arcadia University. In 1973 she and her first husband moved to New Hampshire, as a part of the country life movement.

== Writing ==
Clark's first book, The Place He Made, is a memoir of her husband, Paul Bolton, who died of cancer at the age of 39. In the book Clark examined her recent experience of cancer and at death. The New York Times Book Review called The Place He Made "a triumph of the human spirit . . . sure to take its place among the best of the literature." Subsequent works include As Simple As That, which is a collection of her essays and vignettes from the Mary's Farm columns she wrote for Yankee, and Saturday Beans and Sunday Suppers: Kitchen Stories from Mary's Farm, a combination of memoir and recipes.

Clark also wrote for Yankee magazine, with her first article appearing in 1979. Several of Clark's stories appeared in the 1985 edition of the "Best of Yankee Magazine", including "Abby Rockefeller's Graywater Greenhouse" (January 1979), "The First Frost" (September), and "The Man Who'd Sooner Lamps" (November). In writing the forward for the edition, the editor noted that one nomination for articles that should be included indicated "anything by Edie Clark".

In 2001, Clark created the text for an orchestral work entitled Monadnock Tales in collaboration with composer Larry Siegel which was first presented in Keene, New Hampshire.

A moving obituary contains many details of her life.

== Selected publications ==
- Clark, Edie (2008). The place he made. Peterborough, N.H.: Powersbridge Press. ISBN 978-0-9719934-3-3. OCLC 436873450.
- Clark, Edie (2013). What there was not to tell : a story of love and war. Dublin, N.H.: Benjamin Mason Books. ISBN 978-1-62126-029-5. OCLC 861701115.
- Clark, Edie (2007). Saturday beans & Sunday suppers: kitchen stories from Mary's farm. Peterborough, N.H.: Powersbridge Press. ISBN 978-0-9719934-5-7. OCLC 180204042.
- 2003 As Simple as That
- 2004 The View from Mary's Farm
- 2007 Monadnock Tales
- 2014 States of Grace: Encounters with Real Yankees
