= Ella Fajardo =

Filipino basketball player

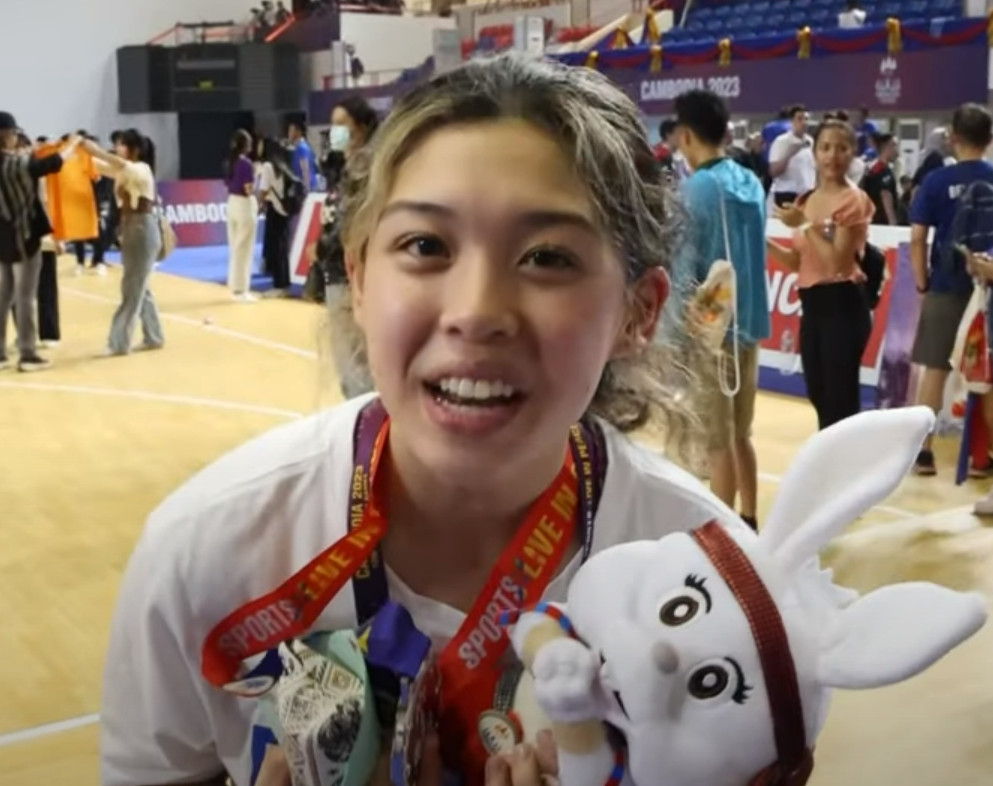
- Ella Fajardo during the 2023 SEA Games

No. 10 – Iona Gaels
- Position: Point guard
- League: Metro Atlantic Athletic Conference

Personal information
- Born: March 15, 2003 (age 23) Bergenfield, New Jersey, U.S.
- Listed height: 5 ft 5 in (1.65 m)

Career information
- High school: Gill St. Bernard's (Gladstone, New Jersey)
- College: Fairleigh Dickinson (2021–2023); Iona (2023–present)
Medals
Women's basketball
Philippines
SEA Games
Gold medal – first place	2021 Hanoi	Team
Silver medal – second place	2023 Phnom Penh	Team
Women's 3x3 basketball
Philippines
FIBA 3x3 U18 Asia Cup
Bronze medal – third place	2019 Malaysia	Team

Ella Patrice Totengco Fajardo (born March 15, 2003) is a Filipino college basketball player who plays for the Iona Gaels of the Metro Atlantic Athletic Conference (MAAC). She represents the Philippine national team in international competitions.

== Career ==
=== Early years ===
Fajardo learned the fundamentals of playing basketball by attending a Milo-Best Center in the Philippines. In the United States she attended Gill St. Bernard's School, playing for her high school's basketball team. In her senior year, Fajardo helped her school win the championship securing her a scholarship at Fairleigh Dickinson University.

=== College ===
Fajardo announced in July 2021 her commitment to play for NCAA Division I sides Fairleigh Dickinson Knights. The National University in the Philippines also tried to recruit her.

Fajardo redshirted the 2021–22 season due to commitments to the Philippine women's team. She made her debut during the 2022–23 season in a loss to Marquette, leading the team with 16 points. She then got 14 points in a win over Cornell, and got Rookie of the Week honors. That season, FDU lost in the NEC Finals to Sacred Heart and lost in the first round of the 2023 WNIT.

In June 2023, Fajardo announced that she would be moving to Iona University to play for the Gaels. She would have to redshirt for one year.

=== National team ===
Fajardo, a native of Bergenfield, New Jersey, is eligible to play for the Philippines through both of her parents. She holds dual citizenship.

Fajardo has played for the Philippine women's 3x3 team which won a bronze medal in the 2019 FIBA 3x3 U18 Asia Cup in Malaysia and reached the quarterfinals of the 2019 FIBA 3x3 U18 World Cup in Mongolia.

She debuted for the Philippine women's team at the 2021 FIBA Women's Asia Cup in India.

== Career statistics ==
=== College ===
Year	Team	GP	GS	MPG	FG%	3P%	FT%	RPG	APG	SPG	BPG	TO	PPG
2022–23	Fairleigh Dickinson	32	1	20.8	38.7	38.8	81.6	2.4	1.3	0.3	0.0	1.8	7.8
2023–24	Iona	30	29	31.3	30.9	24.5	82.5	3.7	3.4	1.1	0.1	2.5	7.1
2024–25	Iona	32	32	26.4	38.8	35.1	78.4	2.6	2.6	0.7	0.0	2.6	9.3
Career		94	62	26.1	36.3	33.0	81.1	2.9	2.4	0.7	0.0	2.3	8.1
Statistics retrieved from Sports-Reference.

== Personal life ==
Fajardo runs a YouTube channel, which as of May 2023, has 125k subscribers. She has her own name, image and likeness (NIL) deal through a company in the Philippines.
