= Evergreen Diplomats =

- Full name: Evergreen Diplomats
- Nickname: DMV FC
- Founded: 2014
- Ground: Marvin F. Wilson Stadium
- Capacity: 5,500
- Chairman: Tony Poarch
- Head coach: Al Reza
- League: American Soccer League

Evergreen Diplomats was a professional soccer team based in Landover, Maryland. On April 3, 2014 it was announced that the club would compete in the American Soccer League (ASL) in 2014–15. The Diplomats are owed by United Paradigm Group and the Executive Director is Tony Poarch. The Diplomats 1st head coached was Philip Gordon, a native of Scotland and product of Hibernian F.C. Academy who was replaced by Al Reza.

The club play their home matches at Marvin F. Wilson Stadium, which is part of the Prince George's Sports & Learning Complex. The facility features a FieldTurf surface and eight-lane running track.

== Club ==
=== Roster ===
Note: Flags indicate national team as defined under FIFA eligibility rules; some limited exceptions apply. Players may hold more than one non-FIFA nationality.

No.	Pos.	Nation	Player
0	GK	USA	Bryan Butler
2	DF	USA	Joel Musa
3	DF	USA	Chris Maimone
4	DF	USA	Aaron Beal
5	MF	USA	Brian Graham
6	DF	USA	Julian Sissman
7	MF	USA	Kingsley Onwuka
8	MF	USA	Hernan Angulo
9	FW	USA	Brian Davis
10	MF	USA	Geaton Caltabiano
11	MF	USA	Zach Bowman
12	MF	USA	Josh Chelleh
13	DF	USA	Sophian Seidnaly

No.	Pos.	Nation	Player
14	MF	USA	Jade Mesias
15	FW	USA	Michel Okai
16	MF	USA	Vitalis Atemefac
17	DF	USA	Donald Gibson
1	FW	USA	Ryan Russell
19	DF	BRB	Daryl Ferguson
20	DF	USA	Omar Ismail
21	MF	USA	Lester Dewee
—	DF	USA	Alambi Clark
23	FW	PER	Hernan Angulo
—	MF	USA	Eddie Campbell
18	DF	USA	Geoffry Bowman
22	MF	USA	Brian Greco
