= CT United FC (2015) =

- Founded: 2015
- Ground: Veterans Stadium (New Britain, Connecticut)
- Capacity: 8,500
- Chairman: Greg Jan Bajek

Connecticut United FC was a soccer team located in New Britain, Connecticut. The team, founded in 2015, played in the American Soccer League. The club's President was Greg Jan Bajek.
