= Veterans Stadium (New Britain, Connecticut) =

Sports venue in New Britain, Connecticut, United States

Coordinates: 41.648434°N 72.772667°W

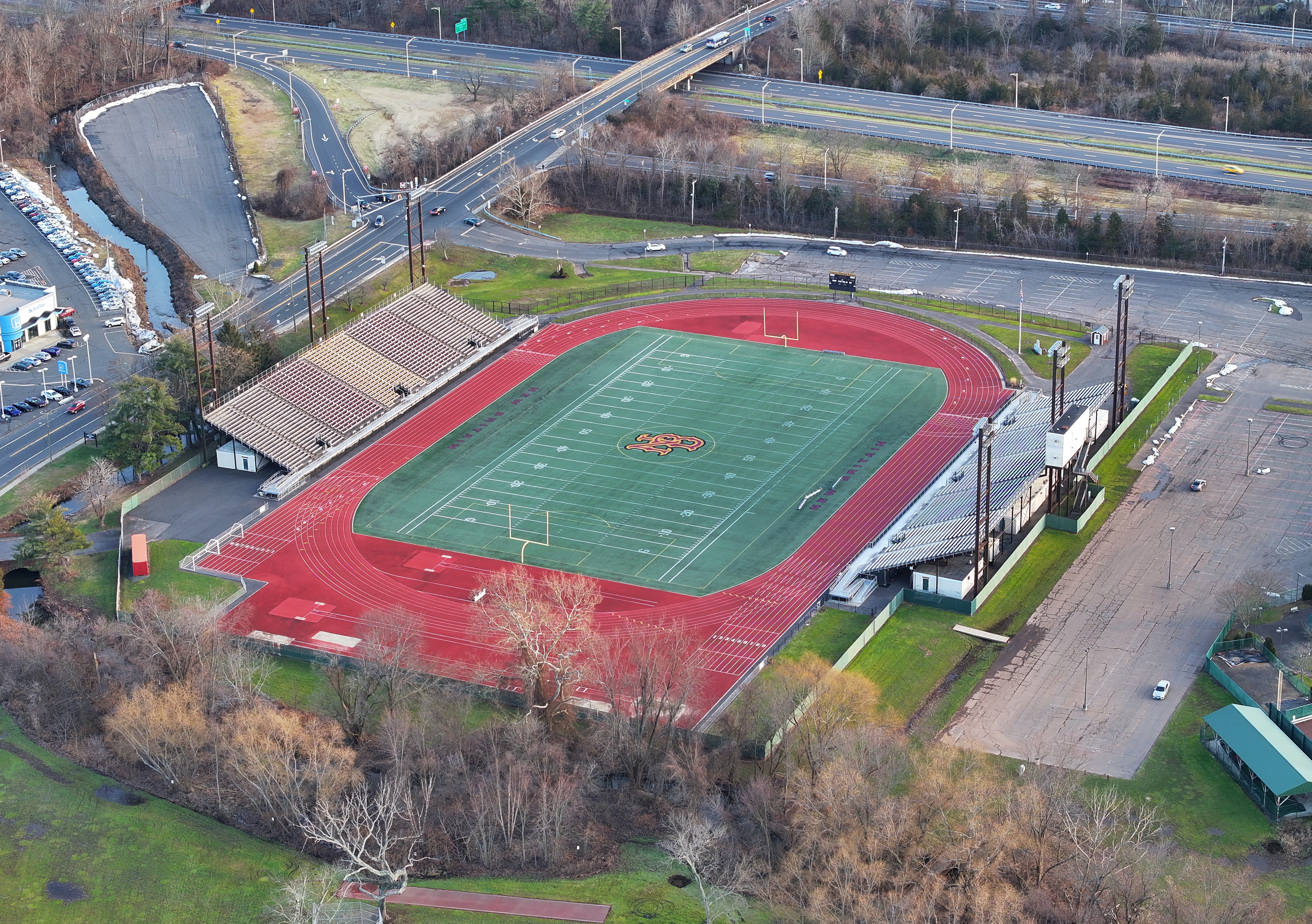
- Interactive map of Veterans Stadium
- Location: Willow Brook Park; New Britain, Connecticut
- Owner: New Britain, Connecticut
- Operator: New Britain, Connecticut
- Capacity: 8,448
- Surface: Grass

Construction
- Opened: 1982

Tenants
- New Britain Golden Hurricanes (1982-Present); Connecticut Wolves (USL) (1993-2002); U.S. Open Cup (2001, 2007-2009); SoccerPlus Connecticut (WPSL) (2006-2008); CT United FC (ASL) (2015-2017); Connecticut Crushers (NWFA)

Veterans Stadium (full name Veterans Memorial Stadium) is a multi-purpose stadium in New Britain, Connecticut. Opened in 1982, it is dedicated to the soldiers of the city who died in various U.S. wars, particularly Vietnam. The stadium now Houses CT United FC of the American Soccer League.

The stadium is used mostly by New Britain High School, and some other area schools, for football and soccer games. It also hosts the Connecticut Crushers of the National Women's Football Association. The stadium was also home to the Connecticut Wolves team of the United Soccer Leagues before that team folded in 2002.

The stadium is an 8-lane oval track around a regulation-size football field. The track was dedicated to coach Irving S. Black in April 1992. Seating is all in metal bleachers, with 7 sections of 27 rows each on either side of the field. The estimated capacity is 12,448. In the summer of 2012, the middle seating on both sides was changed to better match the colors of New Britain High School, which are maroon and gold.

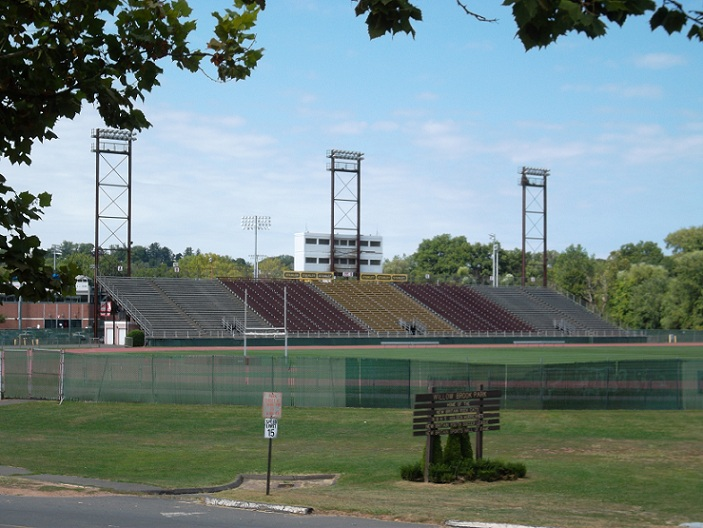
Seating colors of Veterans Stadium, Sept. 2012

The stadium is owned by the City of New Britain, and is part of Willow Brook Park. Also located in the complex are two baseball fields, New Britain Stadium and Beehive Field.

== Sports ==
=== Soccer ===
In the 1970s and 1980s, it hosted four United States men's national soccer team matches. It most famously hosted the Lamar Hunt U.S. Open Cup semifinals game between the Carolina Railhawks and the New England Revolution on September 4, 2007, in which New England won 2–1 to advance to the finals, where they eventually defeated FC Dallas for the Dewar Cup. New England would return to Veterans Stadium on July 1, 2008, to defeat the Richmond Kickers 3–0 in the 3rd round of the 2008 U.S. Open Cup. New England would return again on July 8, 2008, to play Crystal Palace Baltimore in the quarterfinal round. After 90 minutes of play and a half-hour of overtime, with the score 1-1, New England midfielder Mauricio Castro scored the Rev's 5th penalty kick out of five, winning the game on penalty kick on a score of 5–3. The New England Revolution were 3-1-0 at Veterans Stadium after their 2-1 Open Cup loss to Harrisburg City Islanders on June 30, 2009.

The WPS Boston Breakers played a home match in Veterans Stadium against the Atlanta Beat in 2010.

==== Notable matches ====
| Date | Teams | Match Type | Attendance | Notes |
|---|---|---|---|---|
| August 12, 1973 | United States 1-0 Poland | International Friendly | 10,000 | |
| July 13, 1988 | United States 0-2 Poland | International Friendly | 10,213 | |
| June 17, 1989 | United States 2-1 Guatemala | 1990 FIFA World Cup Qualification | 10,516 | |
| August 30, 1991 | United States 0-1 Norway | International Friendly | 5,563 | |
| August 16, 1992 | United States 2-4 Norway | International Friendly | 1,547 | |
| August 6, 1994 | China 3-2 Germany | International Friendly | - | |
| July 30, 1995 | United States 9-0 Chinese Taipei | 1995 US Cup | 3,782 | |
| May 15, 1996 | China 5-0 Canada | 1996 US Cup | - | |
| May 26, 1996 | United States 2-1 Scotland | International Friendly | 8,526 | |
| May 31, 1997 | United States 4-0 Canada | 1997 US Cup | 6,562 | |
| June 26, 2001 | Connecticut Wolves 3–2 Tampa Bay Mutiny | 2001 U.S. Open Cup; Second Round | 4,362 | |
| September 4, 2007 | New England Revolution 1–0 Carolina Railhawks | 2007 U.S. Open Cup; Semifinal | 4,203 | |
| July 1, 2008 | New England Revolution 3–0 Richmond Kickers | 2008 U.S. Open Cup; Third Round | 3,950 | |
| June 30, 2009 | New England Revolution 1–2 Harrisburg City Islanders | 2009 U.S. Open Cup; Third Round | 3,100 | |
| May 29, 2010 | Turkey 2-0 Northern Ireland | International Friendly | 4,000 | |
| August 21, 2010 | Boston Breakers 2–3 Atlanta Beat | Women's Professional Soccer | 4,071 | |
