= AC Crusaders =

- Full name: AC Crusaders
- Nickname: Crusaders
- Founded: 2010
- Ground: Egg Harbor Township High School; Egg Harbor Township, New Jersey
- Capacity: 3,000
- Owner: Matt Driver
- Head coach: Kyle Hall
- League: American Soccer League
Home colors	Away colors

AC Crusaders is a professional American soccer team based in Egg Harbor Township, New Jersey, United States. Founded in 2010, the team made its debut in the Northeast Keystone Division of the National Premier Soccer League, the fourth tier of the American Soccer Pyramid in 2011. The Crusaders return to compete in the American Soccer League (ASL) in August 2014.

The team plays its home games in the stadium at Egg Harbor Township High School.

== History ==
AC Crusaders played two seasons in the NPSL, finishing in fourth place of the Keystone Division each year. Their inaugural season of 2011 ended with a record of 6–3–3. The club finished 4–0–6 in the 2012 NPSL season before going on hiatus.

== Current roster ==
As of March 1, 2015

No.	Position	Nation	Player
1	GK		Ryan Gill
12	GK		Mike Randall
2	DF		Rich Stone
3	DF		Kyle Martyn
4	DF		Jake Nelson
5	DF		Shaka Kamara
6	DF		Brendan Reilly
7	MF		Mitch Grotti
8	MF		Nico Tramontana
9	MF		Adam Sternberger
10	MF		Frank Tweneboa
11	MF		Rodney Agguire
13	MF		Julian Berrios
14	MF		Steve Austion
15	MF		Foday Kamara
16	MF		Eugene Shepherd
17	FW		Ryan Morris
18	FW		Dodji Freita
19	FW		Dan Coviello

== Year-by-year ==
Year	Division	League	Regular Season	Playoffs	Open Cup
2011	4	NPSL	4th, Keystone	Did not qualify	Did not enter
2012	4	NPSL	4th, Keystone	Did not qualify	Did not enter
2014–2015	3	ASL	5th	Current	Did not enter

== Coaches ==
Kyle Hall was named head coach of the AC Crusaders on December 5, 2014, after taking over as interim head coach on September 19, 2014. Hall quickly made his mark on the first team as interim manager, leading the Crusaders to a win against Mass United. Hall finished the Fall season with one win, one tie and two losses. A native of Bolton, England. Hall joined the AC Crusaders' sister company Atlantic Soccer Factory staff at the academy ranks in June 2012, where he serves as their Technical director. Additionally, Hall was the U23 assistant coach where he served his time under head coach Matt Driver and was instrumental in helping the U-23's capturing the 2013 league title.

Jason Smith was named assistant coach of the AC Crusaders on February 27, 2015. The Scotland native recently joined the Crusader sister company Atlantic Soccer Factory in 2013 where he holds the role of Regional Director.

He has experience working in the Scottish Championship with Raith Rovers & Cowdenbeath Football Club where Jason coached the U17's, U19's and reserve team squads. Smith also spent a year working with Perth Glory in Australia coaching their youth program. He holds his UEFA C Licence and is currently working towards his UEFA B Licence.

== Stadium ==
- Egg Harbor Township High School; Egg Harbor Township, New Jersey (2011–present)
