= Gill St. Bernard's School =

Private school in Somerset County, New Jersey, US

Location
- Peapack-Gladstone, Somerset County, New Jersey; United States
- 40.7334°N 74.6708°W

Information
- Type: Private
- Motto: Schola Mundus Est "The World is Our Classroom"
- Established: 1900
- NCES School ID: 00869058
- Headmaster: Delvin Dinkins
- Faculty: 78.8 FTEs
- Grades: Pre-K through 12
- Enrollment: 561 (plus 17 in PreK, as of 2023–24)
- Student to teacher ratio: 7.1:1
- Campus: 208 acres (840,000 m^{2})
- Colors: Blue and White
- Athletics conference: Skyland Conference
- Nickname: Knights
- Accreditation: Middle States Association of Colleges and Schools
- Tuition: $53,900 (9–12 for 2025–26)
- Website: www.gsbschool.org

Gill St. Bernard's School is a private, nonsectarian, coeducational, college preparatory day school located along the Somerset-Morris county line between the Gladstone section of Peapack-Gladstone and Chester Township, in the U.S. state of New Jersey. Established in 1900, Gill St. Bernard's is the result of the merger of two Somerset Hills institutions: St. Bernard's School for boys in Gladstone and The Gill School for girls. The school serves students in primary (3- to 4-year-olds) through twelfth grade. The school has been accredited by the Middle States Association of Colleges and Schools Commission on Elementary and Secondary Schools since 1979 and is accredited until January 2028.

Gill St. Bernard's School is a member of and accredited by the National Association of Independent Schools and the New Jersey Association of Independent Schools. In 2014, Gill St. Bernard's was ranked the number four private high school in New Jersey by national ranking service Niche.

As of the 2023–24 school year, the school had an enrollment of 561 students (plus 17 in PreK) and 78.8 classroom teachers (on an FTE basis), for a student–teacher ratio of 7.1:1.

== Campus ==
The campus has three divisions: the lower school (Cox Building), middle school (Conover Building), and upper school. The upper school contains the Chapin Science Complex, the Hockenbury Building (Student Center, Library, and Humanities Classes), Founders Hall (Art, Lunch, and Language, and Dining Hall) and Matthews Theater (music, drama, performing arts etc.)

== History ==
St. Bernard's School was founded in 1900 by the Rev. Thomas A. Conover. In the early days, academic classes alternated with work in the carpentry shop, print shop or on the farm. Regular attendance at religious services was required. In 1956, boarding at St. Bernard's School was discontinued.

The Gill School was established by Miss Elizabeth Gill in 1934 as the Wychwood School. In 1940 Miss Gill's School moved to Stronghold, the former Dryden estate on Bernardsville mountain.

In 1972, St. Bernard's School merged with Miss Gill's School to become Gill St. Bernard's School. At this time the religious affiliation of St. Bernard's was discontinued. The new school hosted grades K–8 on the old Gill campus in Bernardsville and grades 9–12 on the St. Bernard's campus in Gladstone. The two divisions consolidated in 1997 on the Gladstone campus. Sid Rowell became Headmaster in 2001 and served until July 2025, when he was succeeded by Delvin Dinkins.

Today, there are three divisions—Lower, Middle and Upper—located on 208 acres (840,000 m^{2}) which span the Somerset-Morris County line between the Borough of Peapack-Gladstone and Chester Township.

The school acquired Hi-Hills Day Camp in 2002, which had previously operated on the campus since the late 1960s. A new athletic center opened in fall 2004 that includes three full-sized basketball courts, administrative offices, and Brueckner Hall. The Hockenbury Academic Center, a 33,000-square-foot (3,100 m^{2}) academic building, opened in March 2009 and includes Upper School classrooms, student center, conference room and a school store. An addition to Founders Hall was completed in 2012 that included additional dining space and art studios. A new turf field was constructed in summer 2013. The school also features five playing fields, a track, seven, tennis courts, an outdoor swimming pool and a low ropes course.

== Extracurricular activities ==
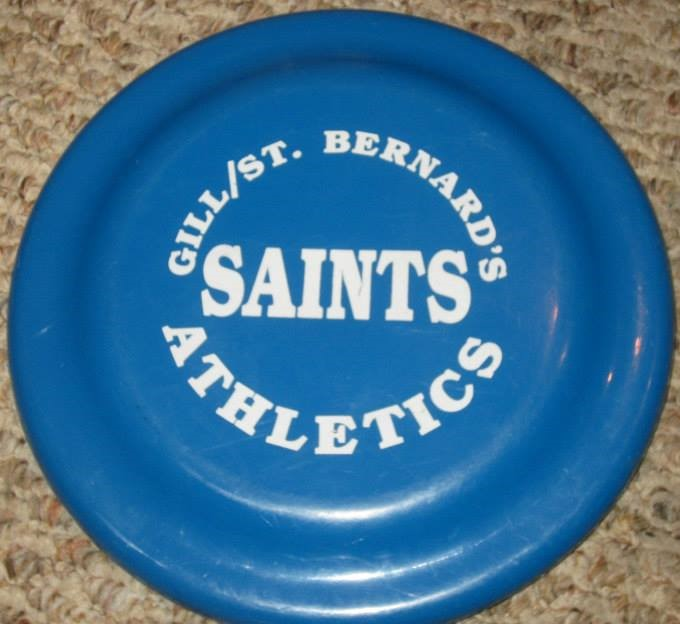
"Gill/St. Bernard's Saints Athletics Frisbee" Merch from 1989

The Gill St. Bernard's Knights compete in the Skyland Conference which is comprised of public and private high schools in Hunterdon, Somerset and Warren counties and operates under the supervision of the New Jersey State Interscholastic Athletic Association (NJSIAA). With 277 students in grades 10–12, the school was classified by the NJSIAA for the 2019–20 school year as Non-Public B for most athletic competition purposes, which included schools with an enrollment of 37 to 366 students in that grade range (equivalent to Group I for public schools).

Athletic facilities include a field house, athletic center, seven all-weather tennis courts, outdoor track, two full size basketball courts, sport court, lacrosse wall, as well as soccer and sports fields. Programs include fencing, basketball, cross country, volleyball, baseball, golf, ice hockey, lacrosse, soccer, softball, track and field, swimming and tennis.

Gill St. Bernard's offers 24 different opportunities for interscholastic sports, including 12 competitive athletic programs for boys and 13 for girls in the Upper School. In the three years through 2013, every varsity team qualified for the NJSIAA post-season, and many advanced to sectional semifinals and finals. GSB teams have won 35 conference championships since the beginning of the 2006–2007 school year. Since 2007, five GSB varsity teams have been ranked in the "Top 20" in New Jersey, a state with more than 450 public and non-public schools. The girls' basketball, boys' tennis, boys' soccer, boys' basketball, and girls' tennis teams have won Non-Public B North Sectional Championships. The girls' basketball team won the Somerset County championship in the 2008–2009, 2011–2012 and 2012–2013 school years, and was the smallest school in Somerset County to ever win a county championship in a team sport. Several coaches have been named Coach of the Year by various media outlets.

The school was awarded the ninth annual ShopRite Cup in the Non-Public B Division in 2012 as the most outstanding school. In 2013, Gill St. Bernard's School was runner-up.

The 2007 girls tennis team won the Non-Public Group B state championship, defeating Newark Academy in the semifinals and knocking off runner-up Moorestown Friends School 5-0 in the final match of the playoffs.

In each of the three years from 2006 to 2008, Doug Smith won the individual Non-Public Group B cross-country running championship, making him the sixth runner in state history to earn three individual state titles.

The boys soccer team won the Non-Public Group B state championship in 2009 (defeating runner-up St. Rose High School in the finals), 2013 (vs. Montclair Kimberley Academy), 2016 (vs. Hudson Catholic Regional High School), 2018 (vs. Rutgers Preparatory School) and 2019 (vs. Moorestown Friends School). The 2009 team won the program's first state title in 2009 with a 2–0 win against St. Rose in the finals of the Non-Public B tournament. The team won the 2013 Non-Public B title with a 2-0 win against Montclair Kimberley Academy, having lost to MKA in the Non-Public B finals in 2011 and 2012. In 2016, the team won the Non-Public Group B state championship with a 2–0 win against Hudson Catholic to finish the season 17-4-1. After starting the 2018 season with two wins in its first nine games, the team won 12 of its final 13, capped off with a 7–0 win against Rutgers Prep in the Non-Public Group B championship game. The team finished the season with a 20–3 record after winning the 2019 Non-Public B title with a 3–0 win against Moorestown Friends in the championship game.

The girls cross country team won the Non-Public Group B state championship in 2011.

The girls spring track team was the Non-Public Group B state champion in 2011.

After losses in the Non-Public B finals to Trenton Catholic Academy in 2010 and 2011, the girls basketball team defeated Trenton Catholic by a score of 82–70 in the finals of the sectional playoffs and then went on to win the 2012 Non-Public Group B state championship, the program's first, after defeating runner-up Morris Catholic High School by a score of 69–50 in the tournament final.

In 2019, the boys basketball team won its fifth straight Somerset County Tournament championship with a 73–53 win against Watchung Hills Regional High School in the finals.

The school offers additional extracurricular activities for Middle and Upper School students in the areas of the arts, community service, student government, and academics. The Upper School performing arts program won the Paper Mill Playhouse Outstanding Overall Production of a Musical in 2008 and 2012 for The Secret Garden and The Mystery of Edwin Drood, respectively, in addition to multiple Outstanding Achievement and Rising Star nominations and awards.

== Notable alumni ==
- Sean S. Baker (born 1971, class of 1989), Palme d'Or and four-time Academy Award winning film director best known for Anora and The Florida Project
- Tyus Battle (born 1997, transferred), college basketball player for the Syracuse Orange
- Greg Best (born 1964, class of 1982), equestrian competitor and coach in the sport of show jumping who won two silver medals for the United States in the 1988 Summer Olympic Games
- Edie Clark (1948–2024), nonfiction author who was known for her writings with Yankee magazine and books on New England life
- Tim DiBisceglie (born 1994, class of 2013), professional soccer player for the Philadelphia Atoms
- Ella Fajardo (born 2003), point guard for the Fairleigh Dickinson Knights women's basketball team who has represented the Philippine national team in international competition
- Elena Kampouris (born 1997), actress who appeared in My Big Fat Greek Wedding 2
- Page McConnell (born 1963, class of 1982), multi-instrumentalist most noted for his work as the keyboardist and a songwriter for the band Phish
- Mackenzie Mgbako (born 2004, transferred), basketball player, small forward for the Indiana Hoosiers
- Jaren Sina (born 1994), college basketball player who played for the Seton Hall Pirates and George Washington Colonials
- Laura Sydell (born 1961, class of 1979), former senior technology reporter for Public Radio International's Marketplace, and a regular reporter on for National Public Radio's All Things Considered, Morning Edition, and Weekend Edition
- Albert W. Van Duzer (1917–1999, class of 1935), bishop of the Episcopal Diocese of New Jersey, serving from 1973 to 1982
