= Gianluca Cuomo =

American soccer player

Personal information
- Full name: Gianluca Cuomo
- Date of birth: April 2, 1993 (age 33)
- Place of birth: Rochester, New York, United States
- Height: 1.88 m (6 ft 2 in)
- Position: Midfielder

Youth career
- 2008–2011: Empire United

College career
Years	Team	Apps	(Gls)
2012–2013	Monroe Tribunes	20	(2)
2013–2014	Cleveland State Vikings	14	(1)
2015	Warner Royals	15	(2)

Senior career*
Years	Team	Apps	(Gls)
2016–2017	Rochester Riverdogz	10	(3)
2018	San Antonio FC	6	(0)
2019	Mosta	12	(0)
2019	Philadelphia Fury	1	(0)
2020	Richmond Kickers	10	(0)
- * Club domestic league appearances and goals as of April 20, 2021

Gianluca "Luca" Cuomo (born April 2, 1993) is an American soccer player.
