= AFC Lancaster Lions =

American soccer team

- Full name: All Football Club Lancaster Lions
- Nickname: Lions
- Founded: 2015
- Ground: Lancaster Catholic High School
- Capacity: 500
- Owner: Brian Ombiji
- Head Coach: Jenn Hood
- League: United Premier Soccer League
- Website: http://afclancasterlions.com
Home colors	Away colors

AFC Lancaster Lions is an American professional development soccer team based in Lancaster, Pennsylvania, which competes in the United Premier Soccer League (UPSL). The team plays their home matches at Lancaster Catholic High School.

== History ==
The American Soccer League granted a team to Lancaster for the 2015-16 season. Brian Ombiji, a veteran of the USL's Harrisburg City Islanders and youth soccer programs in South Central Pennsylvania, is the primary owner of the AFC Lancaster Lions. Additional investors include Daniel Savage, Angelo Disomma, Dean Kline, and Jenn Hood.

The main ASL rival of the AFC Lions is the Philadelphia Fury, named for a previous club by the same name that played in the original North American Soccer League.

The AFC Lions plan to establish an U-23, comprising athletes from colleges and universities throughout Lancaster County. They are also cooperating with the Penn Manor Soccer Club to develop youth soccer programs. In addition to the ASL, the Lions hope to form a women's team that would rival the Lancaster Inferno FC of the United Women's Soccer for local talent.

in March 2019, AFC Lancaster Lions joined the UPSL, a nationally recognized semi-professional soccer league to begin play for the 2019 spring season. The Lions are a member of the Northeast Conference - American Division of the UPSL Championship.

== Logo and colors ==
The colors of the AFC Lancaster Lions are red, blue, yellow, and white. The crest features the motto, Unos pro omnibus, ones pro uno (sic), a Latin phrase meaning, "One for all, all for one". The heraldic imagery of a lion, a red rose, and the contour of the shield likely recall traditional English insignia. For example, the Royal Arms of England features a red shield charged with three golden lions on display, with blue as an accent color. The Pennsylvania city of Lancaster was named for Lancaster, Lancashire, England, whose official symbol was the Red Rose of Lancaster. The soccer balls arranged at the top of the crest are also English in style, with outlines similar to those found on the shield for Manchester United F.C., a renowned Premier League club. The logo also includes two crossed hickory logs, a more local reference since Lancaster city was first named "Hickory Town". The design also shares many elements in common with the civic flag of Lancaster, Pennsylvania, itself featuring two red roses and English royalty colors. Finally, the years 1730 and 2015 finish the logo, commemorating the founding of the city and of the club, respectively.
