= SGFC Eagles Maryland =

Professional soccer club in Maryland, USA

SGFC Eagles
- Nickname: Super Green
- Founded: 1998; 28 years ago
- Ground: Montgomery Blair Stadium
- Capacity: 5,000
- Owner: SGFC Consortium
- Manager: Paul Akinrimisi(TM)
- Coach: Richard Opanuga (Head Coach)
- League: United Premier Soccer League
- 2019: Champion, NSFUSA National Conference, Los Angeles, CA.
- Website: www.sgfcsoccer.com
Home colors	Away colors

SGFC Eagles Maryland was a professional soccer club based in Silver Spring, Maryland. The club competed in the American Soccer League during the league's third and final season in 2017. The team was originally called the Super Green Football Club when it was founded in 1999.

== History ==
Founded in 1999 as The Super Green Football Club, the team participated in the 2009 Bob Marley Tournament and won the championship that season. Later in the year, the team participated in the Baltimore Mayor's Cup, a Maryland Major Soccer League tournament, where they lost in the finals. The Super Green FC team are also known within the Metropolitan area of Washington DC as the Screaming Eagles and the SGFC Eagles Athletics Sports Club. The team also won the Maryland state title "Rowland Cup" in 2013 with a victory over the Baltimore Bays, and represented Region 1 in the Lamar Hunt US Open Cup (MDCVA) prior to National Cup disqualification for having players on their roster who were not qualified to play in the tournament.

In late 2016, the American Soccer League (ASL) added the Super Green Football Club as an affiliate of ASL, rebranded in August 2016 as the SGFC Eagles Maryland Sports Club. Along with a new team name, the club unveiled a new logo that was developed with significant fan input. The club was focused on representing Baltimore and all of the cities and cultures that make up the state of Maryland.

On January 2, 2017, it was announced that Obatola Gabriel, formerly of Sisaket FC, a first division team in Thailand, had signed with SGFC. Joining this ex-international was Penang FA's highest goal scorer, Ranti Martins, who had previously played in Malaysia's Super League for Penang FA after being released by East Bengal at the end of the previous season.

SGFC competed in the ASL for the 2017 season. The ASL folded at the end of that season.

In February 2019, SGFC Eagles Maryland applied to compete in the National Independent Soccer Association, the third tier of the United States soccer league system. In preparation for the 2020 spring season, SGFC competed in and won the 2019 All Nigeria Soccer Tournament in Los Angeles, California.

== Year-by-year results ==
Year	League	Result
2009	Bob Marley Tournament, Virginia	Champion
2009	Baltimore Mayor's Cup (MSL)	Runners-Up
2010	TNT 32nd Annual Championship	Runners-Up
2010	NSFUSA Soccer Convention, Houston, TX	Champion
2012	NSFUSA Soccer Convention, Chicago, IL	2nd Place
2012	TNT 34th Annual Championship, Maryland	Champion
2013	Diaspora World Cup League	Quarter final
2013	NSFUSA Soccer Convention, Dallas, TX	Second Runner-Up
2013	Maryland International Soccer League	Champion
2013	Lamar Hunt US Open Cup - Rowland Cup	State Champion
2014	Maryland International Soccer League	Champion
2014	Diaspora World Cup League MD	Challenge Cup Winner
2014	TNT 35th Annual Championship	Champion
2014	Baltimore Mayor's Cup (MMSL)	Champion
2015	NSFUSA Soccer Convention, El Paso, TX	Second Runner-Up
2015	African Community Cup	2nd Place
2016	NSFUSA Soccer Convention, Miami, FL	Third Place
2016	Baltimore Mayor's Cup	Champion
2017	America Soccer League, ASL	Third Place
2017	Baltimore Mayor's Cup	Undecided
2018	United Premier Soccer League, UPSL	Conference DNQ
2018	NSFUSA Soccer Convention, Houston, Texas	Third Place
2019	NSFUSA Soccer Convention, Los Angeles, CA	Champion

== Affiliated clubs ==
In 2016, SGFC's board announced the beginning of the affiliation link with the 36 Lion Football Club Lagos as a sister club.

== Colors and badge ==
The team's colors and original logo were announced in October 2016 during a presentation in Baltimore. Green and white are the SGFC Eagles' primary colors, with three white stripes along the shoulder. The final design incorporates team history through the vintage logo of soaring eagles. It also includes the Maryland state flag.

== Stadium ==
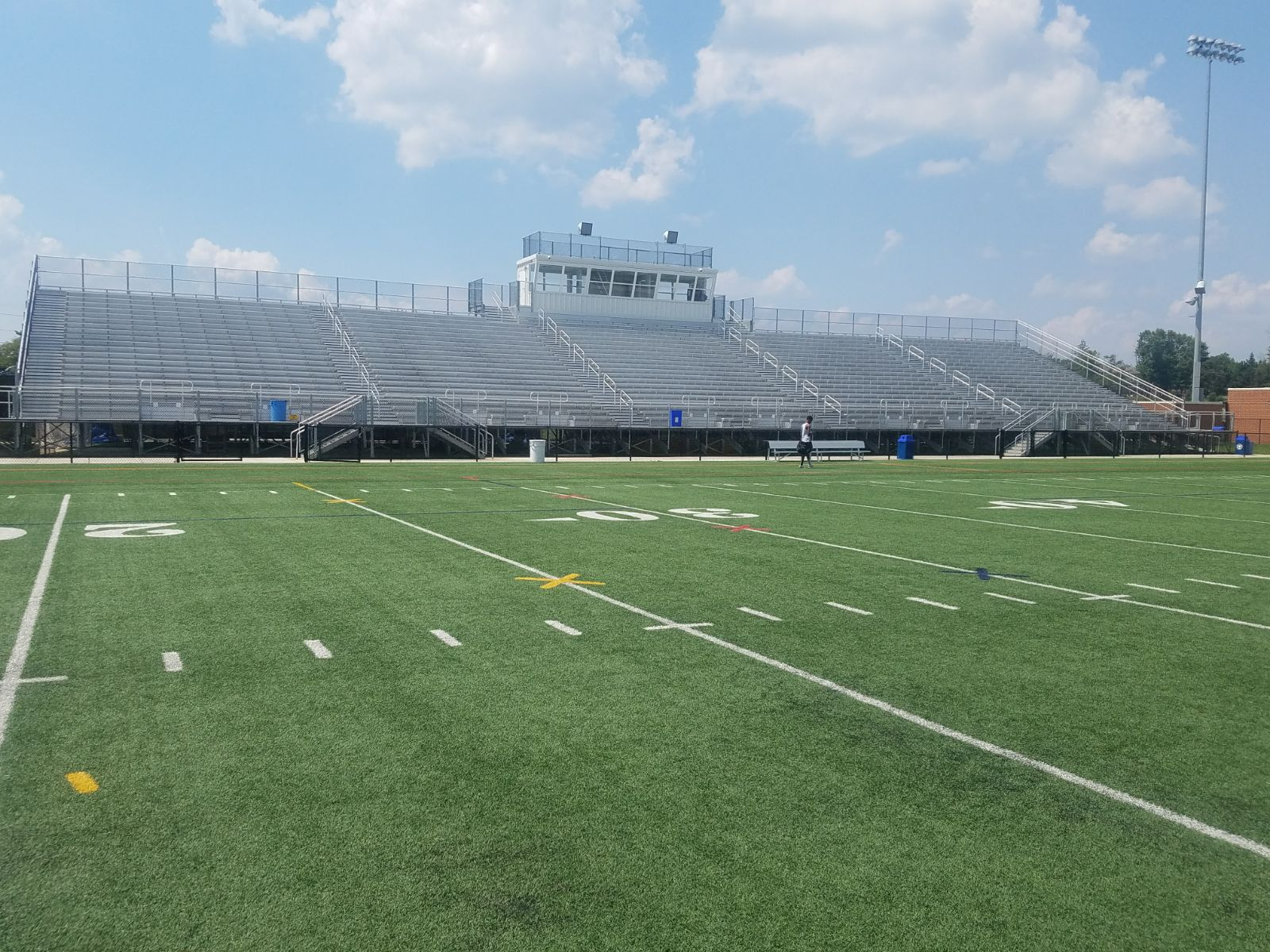
Paint Branch High School Stadium

The home ground of SGFC Eagles Maryland is Paint Branch High School's stadium, a multi-purpose sports facility located in Burtonsville, Maryland.

== Training facilities ==
Since the club's founding in 1999, the SGFC Eagles' training field was MNCPPC Recreation Park located in Metzerott, College Park, adjacent to the University of Maryland campus.

In 2017, the SGFC Eagles moved their training sessions to the Cardinal Gibbons Training Complex in Baltimore.

== Players – 2019 season ==
SGFC Eagles has 26 players: 18 active players (Team A) and eight players grouped for a feeder team and developmental U-21 (Team B).

Note: Flags indicate national team as defined under FIFA eligibility rules; some limited exceptions apply. Players may hold more than one non-FIFA nationality.

No.	Pos.	Nation	Player
1	GK	NGA	Joel Isyaq
8	MF	USA	Arinze Iloka
41	DF	NGA	Abuka F Kareem
11	MF	NGA	Moses Mustapha
14	FW	USA	Alexander Adelabu
7	MF	USA	Mohamed Jawara
17	MF	CIV	Henri Manhebo
22	MF	USA	Ola Ladapo
34	FW	NGA	Ranti Martins Soleye
6	MF	USA	Mwalizi Mutambo

No.	Pos.	Nation	Player
19	FW	USA	Khalid Olamipo Balogun
16	MF	USA	Chukwuemeka Iloka
2	MF	USA	Joseph Belzil
12	MF	USA	Pearson Onyenacho
10	MF	BRA	Lucas Ribeiro Alves
4	MF	USA	Abdul Adeniji
9	DF	USA	Alusine Janneh
18	MF	SLE	Emmanuel Koroma
23	MF	BOL	Junior Velasquez
19	DF	SLE	Mohamed Kaloko

== Transfers / out on loan to Clubside ==
Note: Flags indicate national team as defined under FIFA eligibility rules; some limited exceptions apply. Players may hold more than one non-FIFA nationality.

No.	Pos.	Nation	Player
GRC	DF	USA	Obinna Iloka
GRC	MF	GAM	Lamin Jawneh
ITL	FW	NGA	Gbenga Dada
NGA	MF	NGA	Junior Adeniji

== Club officials ==
=== Personnel ===
Position	Name	Country	
Head Coach	Richard Opanuga	United States	
Goalkeeper & Fitness Coach	Bremer Fernández	Spain	
Technical Director	Joseph Ashley	United States	Nigeria
Team Manager	Chukwudi Chukwudebelu	United States	Nigeria

== Management ==
Position	Name	Country
President / COO	Richard Opanuga	United States
Vice President	Paul Akinrimisi	United States
Director of Sports Management	Chukwudi Chukwudebelu	United States
Director of Athletics	Julio Recinos	El Salvador
Cardiologist	Dr. Zuyue Wang	China
Director, Sports Medicine	Dr. Daniel Olanrewaju	United States
Psychologist / Trainer	Alexis Donogue	United States
Medical Assistant	Davis Eduok	United States
Director, Communications & Media policy	Rotimi Omope	United States
Head of Public Relations	Brian Baublitz	United States
Equipment Manager	Emmanuel Olagunle	United States
Media Officer – Africa	Olawale Olatoye	Nigeria
Head, Player Recruitment – Europe	Peter Denise Alade	Greece
