= Mass United Rush FC =

- Full name: Mass United Rush Football Club
- Nickname: The Riders
- Founded: 2009
- Ground: Manning Field
- Capacity: 4,000
- Owner: Jim Antonakas
- Head Coach: Jim Antonakas
- League: American Soccer League
Home colors	Away colors

Mass United Rush FC, formerly Mass United FC was an American soccer team based in Lynn, Massachusetts, United States.

== History ==
Founded in 2009, the team made its debut in the Northeast – Atlantic Conference of the National Premier Soccer League (NPSL), the fourth tier of the American Soccer Pyramid, in 2011. In March 2011, Mass United FC, announced its 2011 NPSL schedule to be played at the City of Lynn's Manning Field.

The club's colors were "United Blue", yellow and white.

The club also operated teams in the Bay State Soccer League (BSSL) and the Massachusetts State Soccer League (MSSL), as well as an indoor team in the MSSL.

Mass United FC declared that it will sit out the 2013 NPSL season. It was later announced the club would be part of the inaugural season of the relaunched American Soccer League in 2014, signing Trinibagonian Kareem Smith. The league folded in 2017.

== Season-by-season ==
Season	League	Regular season	W-D-T	Playoffs	Open Cup	Amateur Cup
2011	NPSL	6th, Atlantic	2-1-7	Did not qualify	Did not enter	Did not enter
2012	NPSL	5th, Atlantic	4-1-8	Did not qualify	First qualifying round	First qualifying round
2014-15	ASL	4th	6-9-2	Did not qualify	Did not enter	
