= Philadelphia Fury (2011–2019) =

- Nickname: Fury
- Founded: 2011
- Stadium: Franklin Field
- Capacity: 52,958
- Sporting Director/CEO: Matt Driver
- Chairman: Martin E. Judge
- Head coach: Cris Vaccaro
- League: National Independent Soccer Association
- Website: https://philadelphiafury.com/
Home colors	Away colors

The Philadelphia Fury was an American soccer team based in Philadelphia, Pennsylvania, that last competed in the National Independent Soccer Association (NISA). The club formerly competed in the American Soccer League and is currently owned by Martin E. Judge and Matt Driver. The team continued to sport the colors of the original NASL team.

== Kit, crest, and colors ==
Like the team name, the current iteration of the club uses both the original colors and crest of the original North American Soccer League team.

== History ==
The original Philadelphia Fury was an expansion franchise in the original North American Soccer League and played for three seasons in Veterans Stadium starting in 1978. Among the club's investors were rock musicians Mick Jagger, Rick Wakeman, Peter Frampton and Paul Simon. They were the NASL's second attempt in Philadelphia, the first being the Philadelphia Atoms (1973–76). Although never posting a winning season, they did make the playoffs in two of their three seasons. Attendance declined with each season and in 1980, the club was sold and moved to Montreal, becoming the Montreal Manic.

After the team ceased operations, the Fury name remained dormant until 2011 when the teams Intellectual property rights were purchased by Matt Driver, a former player and coach. The team began play in 2012 as an amateur team in the regional adult league the United States Club Soccer's National Adult League. However, soon after the re-founding of the team it joined the American Soccer League, a league created and ran by Driver. The team played its games in Southern New Jersey.

In 2016, it was reported that the Fury were attempting to join the now defunct North American Soccer League (NASL) in a partnership with Driver, investors from the United Arab Emirates, and Spanish club SD Eibar. This deal would have also seen the ASL become a development league for the NASL. However, in 2018 the NASL went on hiatus after not receiving division II sanctioning and losing many of its teams to the USL Championship and the NPSL.

In 2019 it was reported that the Fury and Driver were again attempted to join a professional soccer league, this time it was the new National Independent Soccer Association. It was further reported that the team would play their inaugural season at the historic Franklin Field in West Philadelphia. In June 2019, it was reported that the primary benefactors of the team would be Martin Judge and the Judge Group with Judge serving as the Chairman of the Board and Driver serving as the team's CEO and Sporting Director.

It was announced that the Fury would take part in the inaugural NISA season. The regular season is split into two halves, fall and spring, with playoffs at the end. The fall season, named "NISA Showcase", will feature 8 teams, with the East and West champions earning berths into the 2020 playoffs. While more teams are expected to compete in the Spring half in the season, the Fury will take part in both the second half "full" season and the fall "NISA Showcase." On September 18, 2019, it was announced that the Fury's lead investor had pulled out of the project, and the team would pull out of the NISA Showcase in order to reorganize for the Spring Season, though the team has since been inactive.

== Year-by-year ==
Year	Division	League	Record	Position	Playoffs	US Open Cup
2019–20	3	NISA	0–0–6 (Note: Team only played one game, loss versus Miami FC, before withdrawing from NISA and forfeiting the rest of its matches)	4th - East Coast	did not qualify	N/A

== See also ==
- Philadelphia Atoms SC
- Philadelphia Union
- Philadelphia Lone Star FC
- Philadelphia Spartans
