= American Soccer League (2014–2017) =

Defunct soccer league in the United States

- Founded: 2014; 12 years ago
- Folded: 2017; 9 years ago
- Country: United States
- Confederation: U.S. Soccer
- Number of clubs: 10
- Domestic cup: U.S. Open Cup
- Last champions: Philadelphia Fury (2017)
- Website: www.aslsoccer.org

The American Soccer League (ASL) was an American soccer league that held three seasons of play between August 2014 and 2017. It is the fourth league in U.S. history to use that name. The league footprint was in the northeastern United States. ASL players were paid, making it different from the NPSL or PDL models in which college-eligible players can compete.

American Professional Soccer (APS) is the parent company of American Soccer League (ASL). The league's goal was to eventually achieve U.S. Soccer Division 3 status. However, this did not materialize. Initially, the league was sanctioned by the United States Adult Soccer Association (USASA).

== History ==
Initially, the league played a fall to spring calendar schedule. After the first season, ASL switched formats to a spring to fall schedule. The ASL spring season ran from April to June. After a short break, the fall season continued in late August and ran until early November. In the league's initial season, an affiliation agreement was formalized with the Canadian Soccer League.

== Teams ==
Team	City	Stadium	Founded
AFC Lancaster Lions	Ephrata, Pennsylvania	Ephrata High School	2015
Atlanta Futuro FC	Snellville, Georgia	Shiloh High School	2015
CT United FC	New Britain, Connecticut	Veterans Stadium	2015
Long Island Express FC	Uniondale, New York	Mitchel Athletic Complex	2016
Maryland SGFC Eagles	Silver Spring, Maryland	Paint Branch HS Athletic Stadium	2017
Mass United FC	Lynn, Massachusetts	Manning Field	2009
Philadelphia Atoms SC	Glenside, Pennsylvania	Jean Lenox West Field	2017
Philadelphia Fury	Glassboro, New Jersey	Richard Wackar Stadium	2012
Virginia FC	Leesburg, Virginia	Evergreen Sport Complex	2017

== Champions ==
Season	Champion	Result	Runner up
2014–15	Icon FC	0–0 (6–5 PKs)	Western Mass Pro
2016	Long Island Express	1–0	Philadelphia Fury
2017	Philadelphia Fury	3–1	Mass United FC

== Rivalry Cups ==
Competition	Most Wins	Titles	Other Club(s)	Titles	Draws	Recent winner
Commonwealth Derby	Mass United FC	2	Western Mass Pioneers	0	4	Mass United FC
Soccer Factory Derby	Philadelphia Fury	2	AC Crusaders	1	1	Philadelphia Fury
Yankee Derby	Mass United FC	1	Rhode Island Oceaneers	0	3	Mass United FC
Philadelphia Derby	Philadelphia Fury	5	Philadelphia Atoms SC	0	0	Philadelphia Fury
Keystone Derby	Philadelphia Atoms SC	2	AFC Lancaster Lions	0	1	Philadelphia Atoms SC

== See also ==
- North American Soccer League
- United Soccer League
- Premier Development League
- National Premier Soccer League
